= 2003 FA Women's Cup final =

2003 FA Women's Cup Final
- The match programme cover
- Event: 2002–03 FA Women's Cup
Charlton Athletic	Fulham
0	3
- Date: 5 May 2003
- Venue: Selhurst Park, London
- Player of the Match: Rachel Yankey (Fulham)
- Referee: George Cain (Liverpool)
- Attendance: 10,389

The 2003 FA Women's Cup Final was an association football match between Fulham Ladies and Charlton Athletic Women on 5 May 2003 at Selhurst Park in London, England. It was the 33rd final overall of the FA Women's Cup, a cup competition originally organised by the Women's Football Association (WFA) between 1970 and 1993, and by The Football Association (FA) since 1993. It was the third successive final for Fulham following their defeat by Arsenal Women in 2001 and their victory over Doncaster Rovers Belles the previous year. The teams had not met before in the FA Women's Cup Final. This was Charlton Athletic's fourth final overall but first under their current name, they had played the previous three as Croydon Women.

The match was played in front of a crowd of 10,389. Charlton almost took the lead after 40 seconds through Amanda Barr but her presentable chance was shot into the side netting. Fulham took the lead in the 18th-minute with a volley scored by Kristy Moore. Charlton's Karen Hills scored an own goal in the 36th-minute to double Fulham's lead, which they maintained to half time. Another own goal from Charlton, this time scored by Fara Williams in the 61st-minute, gave Fulham a 3–0 lead which was the final score. Fulham won the FA Women's Cup for a second time, making it the seventh final in which the previous year's winner was able to retain the cup.

== Match details ==
5 May 2003
13:00 BST

Charlton Athletic	0–3	Fulham
	Report	Moore 18'; Hills 36' (o.g.); Williams 61' (o.g.)

Selhurst Park, London
Attendance: 10,389
Referee: George Cain (Liverpool)

Charlton Athletic	Fulham

GK	1	(England) Pauline Cope	(yellow card) 41'
DF	2	(England) Casey Stoney (c)
DF	12	(England) Susan Rea
DF	3	(England) Eartha Pond
DF	5	(England) Karen Hills
MF	6	(England) Kyproulla Loizou
MF	7	(England) Joanne Broadhurst		(substituted off) 71'
MF	8	(England) Alexa Hunn		(substituted off) 59'
MF	9	(England) Amanda Barr
FW	10	(England) Justine Lorton		(substituted off) 71'
FW	11	(England) Carmaine Walker
Substitutes:
FW	4	(England) Fara Williams		(substituted on) 59'
MF	14	(England) Jessica Smith		(substituted on) 71'
FW	15	(Republic of Ireland) Grainne Kierans
DF	17	(England) Emma Whitter		(substituted on) 71'
GK	20	(England) Susannah Abbott
Manager:
(England) Keith Boanas

GK	1	(Norway) Astrid Johannessen
DF	2	(England) Kim Jerray-Silver
DF	4	(England) Rachel Unitt
DF	6	(Norway) Margunn Haugenes
DF	5	(England) Mary Phillip (c)
MF	14	(Denmark) Katrine Pedersen
MF	3	(England) Rachel McArthur
MF	8	(England) Sanchia Duncan
MF	9	(England) Kristy Moore	(substituted off) 85'
FW	15	(England) Una Nwajei	(substituted off) 77'
FW	11	(England) Rachel Yankey	(substituted off) 90'
Substitutes:
GK	13	(England) Joy Smith
DF	12	(Republic of Ireland) Ronnie Gibbons	(substituted on) 85'
MF	16	(England) Marieanne Spacey	(substituted on) 77'
DF	17	(England) Jessica Wright
MF	41	(Denmark) Gitte Therkelsen	(substituted on) 90'
Manager:
(Norway) Gaute Haugenes

Player of the match
Rachel Yankey (Fulham)

Assistant referees:
Amy Rayner (Derbyshire)
A. Chapman
Fourth official:
J. Singh

Match rules

- 90 minutes.
- 30 minutes of extra-time if necessary.
- Penalty shoot-out if scores still level.
- Five named substitutes.
- Maximum of three substitutions.
