= 2002 FA Women's Cup final =

2002 FA Women's Cup Final
- The match programme cover
- Event: 2001–02 FA Women's Cup
Doncaster Belles	Fulham
1	2
- Date: 6 May 2002
- Venue: Selhurst Park, London
- Player of the Match: Mandy Lowe (Doncaster Belles)
- Referee: Eddie Evans (Manchester)
- Attendance: 10,124

The 2002 FA Women's Cup Final was the 32nd final of the FA Women's Cup, England's primary cup competition for women's football teams. The final event was played between Doncaster Belles and Fulham on 6 May 2002 at Selhurst Park in London. Doncaster Belles entered a record 13th final having won the trophy on six previous occasions. Fulham made its second final appearance, after losing the 2001 final.

Doncaster Belles entered the competition at the fourth round and faced Brighton & Hove Albion, Barry Town, Arsenal and Tranmere Rovers before reaching the final. Fulham entered at the third round stage and beat Newport County, Birmingham City, Coventry City, Everton and Charlton Athletic to reach the final. As a top-flight club,

Fulham entered the match as favourites, in a contest billed as a contrast of styles. Watched by a crowd of 10,124 and a BBC television audience of two and a half million, Fulham won the match 2–1, with goals from Rachel Yankey and Katie Chapman. Jody Handley countered for Doncaster Belles.

== Route to the final ==
=== Doncaster Belles ===
Round	Opposition	Score
4th	Brighton & Hove Albion Women & Girls (a)	5–2
5th	Barry Town (a)	1–0
6th	Arsenal (h)	2–1
Semi-final	Tranmere Rovers (n)	3–1

As Doncaster Belles were an FA Women's Premier League National Division club, they entered the competition in the fourth round; one round later than Fulham. Doncaster Belles' cup run started with a rescheduled trip to the Withdean Stadium to face Brighton & Hove Albion. Despite Brighton taking the lead after only 10 minutes, Doncaster Belles mastered the wet and windy conditions and hit back strongly to win 5–2. In another delayed fixture in the fifth round, Doncaster Belles travelled to Wales to meet Barry Town. The match at Jenner Park was again played in wind and heavy rain. A goal from Jody Handley and a strong midfield performance from debutant Carly Hunt earned a 1–0 win and a quarter final meeting with Arsenal.

The subsequent 2–1 win over Cup holders Arsenal at Brodsworth Welfare Ground surprised many, who had predicted a repeat of the previous year's Arsenal–Fulham final. Doncaster Belles had gone two goals ahead within the first half hour through Handley and Karen Burke. Although Marieanne Spacey replied for Arsenal, a resilient second half display saw Doncaster Belles end a run of six successive defeats—stretching back almost two years—against their old rivals. The BBC reported that the final whistle was "joyously celebrated" by the Doncaster Belles players. In the semi-final against Tranmere Rovers at Prenton Park, defeat appeared likely when Tranmere went ahead through a 28th–minute penalty and Burke missed a penalty for Doncaster Belles. But Carly Hunt scored an equalising goal from close range, then Tranmere were reduced to ten players when Faye Dunn was shown the red card. England captain Karen Walker secured a 3–1 win and Doncaster Belles' place in the final with two late goals.

=== Fulham ===
Round	Opposition	Score
3rd	Newport County (h)	12–0
4th	Birmingham City (a)	5–0
5th	Coventry City (a)	11–0
6th	Everton (a)	4–0
Semi-final	Charlton Athletic (n)	4–1

Fulham's competition began with a trip to fellow Southern Division outfit Newport County. Having already beaten Newport 14–0 in the league, Fulham this time ran 12 unanswered goals past their hapless opponents. "The final score was 12–0 and it could have been more," noted the match report on the Fulham website. In the fourth round Fulham faced a trickier assignment at Birmingham City. Under the leadership of Queens Park Rangers player Marcus Bignot, Birmingham City's young team were top of the Northern Division and had already beaten Doncaster Belles to qualify for the Premier League Cup final, where they would meet Fulham. One goal ahead at half time, Fulham's superior fitness and Marianne Pettersen's eighth hat-trick of the season resulted in a 5–0 win. Bignot lamented "our girls were overawed – they were waiting for Fulham to score."

In the fifth round Fulham routinely dispatched more Northern Division opposition, Coventry City, with an 11–0 win at Nuneaton's Pingles Stadium. The quarter final meeting with National Division Everton followed a similar pattern to the earlier win over Birmingham. A Margunn Haugenes penalty gave Fulham a one-goal advantage at the interval, before a second half increase in tempo saw them depart Merseyside with a 4–0 win and their place in the semi-finals. During the match with Charlton Athletic at Woking's Kingfield Stadium, Pettersen and Kristy Moore put Fulham two goals ahead in the first half, but Charlton reduced the deficit when Astrid Johannessen allowed Fara Williams' tame free kick through her legs. According to The Guardian report, "there was always going to come the time to ask a familiar question: how many would Fulham score?" Pettersen and Moore added another goal each to seal a 4–1 win. Charlton manager Keith Boanas praised the application of his side but admitted they were undone by Fulham's superior fitness.

== Background ==
The 2002 final represented a record 13th final appearance for Doncaster Belles and the first since 2000, when they lost 2–1 to Croydon. They had previously won the Women's Cup on six occasions in 1983, 1987, 1988, 1990, 1992, and 1994. The match was Fulham's second time in the final after they lost the previous season's event to Arsenal. A former incarnation of the club, known as Friends of Fulham, had competed in three finals; winning in 1985, but losing in 1989 and 1990. Although the competition had been run by the Women's Football Association (WFA) since 1970, the Football Association (FA) took over in 1993–94. The 2002 final was the 32nd final overall, the ninth to be played under FA control and the first to be shown live on BBC One.

Despite not yet playing in the FA Women's Premier League National Division, Fulham were already considered "the dominant force in England" by the BBC. In their second year as the only full-time professional women's club in Europe, they had already won that season's FA Women's Premier League Cup by beating Birmingham City 7–1 in the final. In securing the FA Women's Premier League Southern Division championship Fulham beat one team 22–0. The total number of goals they had put past their opponents in 34 league and cup matches stood at 267. Fulham's striker Pettersen—a World Cup winner and Olympic gold medallist with Norway—went into the final looking for her 87th goal of the season. Fulham's Katie Chapman felt the defeat by Arsenal in the previous season's final was extra motivation for her team mates: "At the end of the day we're professional, and we should win. Last year we didn't, and this year we want that FA Cup."

It's fantastic that it is live on BBC 1 for the first time. Everybody knows Doncaster Belles, even outside England. It is a team with a fantastic history and we know it won't be an easy job. We will just have to perform.

— Gaute Haugenes, Fulham manager

Norway's Dagbladet reported that Doncaster Belles favoured a typically English style: "heavy, solid and with many long balls." Although the Belles were a completely amateur outfit, the BBC anticipated that they would present a much more difficult challenge than Fulham had been accustomed to that season. In the 2001–02 National Division Doncaster Belles had finished as runners-up for the third season in succession. In the Premier League Cup they suffered a shock semi final defeat by Birmingham City, collapsing from 3–1 ahead to lose 4–3 to the Northern Division leaders. In April 2002 they had "stunningly" inflicted a 4–0 defeat on Arsenal, the eventual champions' first league defeat in over two and a half years. Manager Julie Chipchase accepted that Fulham were favourites but noted the strength of her own squad: "It's an unusual situation for us to go into a match as the underdogs and I am hoping it will work in our favour. The pressure will be on Fulham but they have some excellent international class players just as we do and it will all be down to who performs on the day."

== Match ==
=== Summary ===
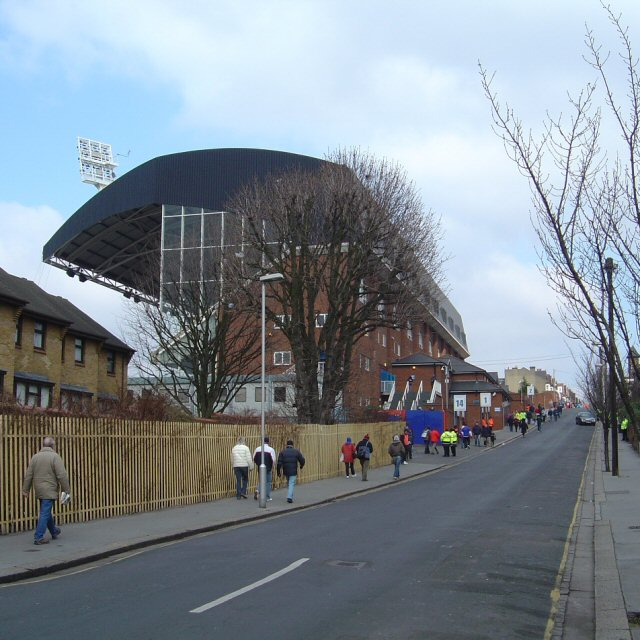
Selhurst Park hosted the final for the second year in succession.

Doncaster Belles lined up in a traditional 4–4–2 formation. Walker overcame a neck injury to start alongside Handley in attack, with Melanie Garside—who scored the winner in the 2000 semi-final—left on the substitutes' bench alongside veteran Gail Borman. The Hunt twins, signed earlier in the season from Charlton Athletic, were both selected; having brought "grit, commitment and shape" to a previously disorganised team. Experienced defender Mandy Lowe was given a marking job on Pettersen. Fulham fielded a 4–3–3 formation, with Rachel Yankey and Kristy Moore flanking Pettersen in attack. Both teams wore their home kits; Doncaster Belles in yellow and blue, while Fulham lined up in white and black.

In what the Daily Telegraph called a "breakneck speed" start to the match, Leanne Hall saved a low 20 yard (18m) shot from Rachel McArthur and Moore later kicked over the bar from close range. At the other end of the pitch, early chances included Walker failing to control Exley's through ball, Michelle Barr shooting narrowly over and Astrid Johannessen parrying Carly Hunt's effort. As the match wore on Pettersen was largely subdued by the close attentions of Lowe. Reports in The Guardian, The Independent and the BBC indicate that the physical and direct approach of the Doncaster Belles stifled Fulham's passing game, keeping scoring opportunities at both ends to a minimum.

Although the teams remained level at the break, Fulham went ahead ten minutes into the second half. Carly Hunt was cautioned for a foul at the edge of the penalty area, then Yankey curled the resultant free kick low around a poorly placed defensive wall and past unsighted Belles goalkeeper Hall. On the hour, with Doncaster Belles still recovering, Chapman volleyed in a second goal for Fulham from 20 yards (18m). Seconds later Burke supplied an accurate cross for Handley to head a reply for Doncaster Belles.

Doncaster Belles continued to defend but Fulham won 2–1 to collect their first FA Women's Cup and complete a treble; along with their Premier League Cup and Premier League Southern Division wins. Ray Kiddell, Chairman of the FA Women's Committee, presented the cup in bank holiday sunshine.

=== Match details ===
6 May 2002
13:00 BST

Doncaster Belles	1–2	Fulham
Handley 61'	FA report BBC report	Yankey 55'; Chapman 60'

Selhurst Park, London
Attendance: 10,124
Referee: Eddie Evans (Manchester)

Doncaster Belles	Fulham

GK	1	(England) Leanne Hall
RB	12	(England) Claire Utley
LCB	4	(England) Mandy Lowe
RCB	5	(Scotland) Michelle Barr
LB	10	(England) Carly Hunt	(yellow card) 55'
RW	7	(England) Karen Burke
RCM	6	(England) Becky Easton (c)
LCM	8	(England) Vicky Exley
LW	3	(England) Gemma Hunt
FW	9	(England) Karen Walker
FW	11	(England) Jody Handley
Substitutes:
DF	2	(England) Lizzie Gomersall
DF	17	(England) Sammy Howarth
MF	14	(England) Sarah Abrahams
FW	18	(England) Gail Borman
FW	16	(England) Melanie Garside
Manager:
(England) Julie Chipchase

GK	1	(Norway) Astrid Johannessen
RB	2	(England) Kim Jerray-Silver
RCB	4	(Denmark) Lene Terp
LCB	5	(England) Mary Phillip
LB	12	(England) Rachel Unitt
RCM	3	(England) Rachel McArthur
CM	6	(England) Katie Chapman
RCM	7	(Norway) Margunn Haugenes	(substituted off) 90'
RW	9	(Australia) (England) Kristy Moore	(substituted off) 61'
FW	11	(Norway) Marianne Pettersen (c)
LW	10	(England) Rachel Yankey
Substitutes:
GK	13	(England) Jody Smith
DF	15	(Norway) Lynn Rebecca Mork	(substituted on) 90'
DF	14	(Republic of Ireland) Ronnie Gibbons
MF	16	(Bahrain) Deena Rahman
MF	8	(England) Sanchia Duncan	(substituted on) 61'
Manager:
(Norway) Gaute Haugenes

Player of the match
Mandy Lowe (Doncaster Belles)

Assistant referees:
C Henry (Northants)
C Hayes (Surrey)
Fourth official:
J. E. Pearce (Essex)

Match rules

- 90 minutes
- 30 minutes of extra-time if necessary
- Penalty shoot-out if scores still level
- Five named substitutes, of which up to three may be used

== Post-match ==
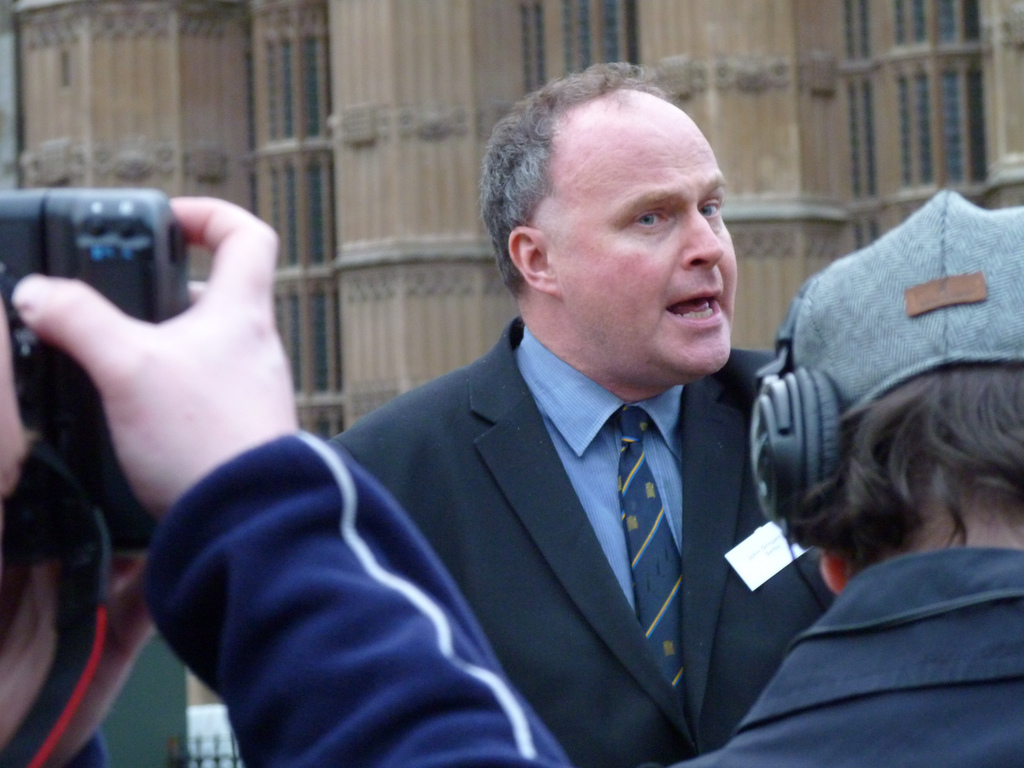
John Grogan praised the BBC's coverage, but was disappointed with Doncaster Belles' defeat

Doncaster Belles striker Walker admitted that Fulham had been the better team, but rejected the idea that the professionals' superior fitness had been decisive: "We matched them for fitness, and that was not the problem. It was the quality which was the difference. They play together week in and week out, and it showed in the end."

Fulham coach Gaute Haugenes was glad to put the previous year's defeat by Arsenal behind them: "The feeling we had here last year – we didn't want to have that again." He added: "It was a tough game but we expected a tough game. Many people put us as favourites but that is the price you pay for being professional." Midfielder Margunn Haugenes, the manager's wife, told Dagbladet that private celebrations in the Haugenes household were unfit for description in a newspaper.

The match attracted a crowd of 10,124 and a television audience of two and a half million. In a Parliamentary debate the following week, John Grogan praised the BBC's coverage of the match but expressed regret that Doncaster Belles, "the pride of Yorkshire," had been beaten by a team from London. Sports Minister Richard Caborn agreed that the coverage, along with the contemporaneous film Bend It Like Beckham, would increase participation levels amongst youngsters: "Anything that we can do to encourage such participation must be welcome."

Footballer Kelly Smith's autobiography, published ten years after the match, stressed the importance of the broadcast coverage: "The FA Women's Cup final was covered live on BBC One as part of the FA's new television deal. It remained on BBC One for seven years. That was a very important step for the game and an important mark of nationwide recognition for the sport."

During the summer break Doncaster Belles turned semi-professional after securing a major sponsorship deal with Green Flag. After their promotion Fulham beat Doncaster Belles again, 4–0 this time, on the opening day of the 2002–03 league season.
