= 2001–02 FA Women's Cup =

Tournament details
- Country: England; Wales

Final positions
- Champions: Fulham
- Runners-up: Doncaster Belles
- Penalty shoot-outs do not count towards the total number of goals.

The 2001–02 FA Women's Cup was an association football knockout tournament for women's teams, held between 9 September 2001 and 6 May 2002. It was the 32nd season of the FA Women's Cup and was won by Fulham, who defeated Doncaster Belles in the final. The tournament consisted of two qualifying rounds and eight rounds of competition proper.

All match results and dates from the Women's FA Cup Website.

== First round qualifying ==
All games were played on 9 September 2001.

Tie	Home team (tier)	Score	Away team (tier)	Att.
1	Barnet Copthall	5–0	Leighton United	
2	Barnsley	3–0	Wigan	
3	Billingham	8–2	Bolton Wanderers (Supporters)	
4	Bolton Wanderers	4–0	Darlington Railway Athletic	
5	Bournemouth Town	7–0	Swindon Spitfires	
6	Brentford	4–2	Redbridge Wanderers	
7	Bristol United	0–7	Exeter City	
8	Bury	14–0	Corwen	
9	Chaffoteaux	6–0	Great Wyrley	
10	Cogan Coronation	2–4	Rover Oxford	
11	Crowborough Athletic	5–3	Haywards Heath Town	
12	Crystal Palace	1–0	Woodbridge Town	
13	Denham United	4–0	Mansfield Road	
14	Dorchester	17–0	Wendron	
15	Gravesend & Northfleet	4–1	Wycombe Wanderers	
16	Gresley Rovers	3–7	Tamworth	
17	Gretna	H–W	Morley Spurs	
Walkover for Gretna.
18	Greyhound Gunners	2–3	Ossett Albion	
19	Haverhill U's	1–3	Colney Heath	
20	King's Lynn	A–W	University of Birmingham	

Tie	Home team (tier)	Score	Away team (tier)	Att.
Walkover for University of Birmingham.
21	Launton	7–1	Viking Rangers	
22	Leicester City	4–0	Kettering Amazons	
23	Loughborough Students	6–4	Kidderminster Harriers	
24	Malling	4–2	London Ladies	
25	Nettleham	0–7	Belper Town	
26	Newquay	4–2	Penzance	
27	Newsham Park Hospital	0–1	Killingworth YPC	
28	North Molton Sports	2–5	Marjons	
29	Okeford United	1–4	Keynsham Town	
30	Pearl	5–2	ES Barwell	
31	Preston North End	3–3 (?–? p)	Warrington Grange	
32	Rushden & Diamonds	8–1	Kesteven & Grantham	
33	Sawbridgeworth Town	1–5	Tring Athletic	
34	Slough	6–0	Royston Town	
35	Stockport Celtic	3–2	Tameside Girls	
36	Wadebridge Town	0–10	Corfe Hills United	
37	West Ham United	3–2	Brunel University	
38	Windscale	4–0	Wakefield	
39	Woking	6–2	Thame United	
40	Woodham Radars	3–7	Abbey Rangers	

== Second round qualifying ==
All games were played on 30 September 2001.

Tie	Home team (tier)	Score	Away team (tier)	Att.
1	Barnsley	7–0	Ossett Albion	
2	Billingham	5–1	Windscale	
3	Blaby & Whetstone	0–8	Loughborough	
4	Bolton Wanderers	9–1	South Durham Royals	
5	Brentford	2–1	Chiswick United	
6	Chaffoteaux	1–4	Loughborough Students	
7	Colney Heath	1–0	Haringey Borough	
8	Corfe Hills United	0–3	Keynsham Town	
9	Croydon Postal	A–W	Abbey Rangers	
Walkover for Abbey Rangers.
10	Crystal Palace	0–3	West Ham United	
11	Denham United	3–1	Harlow Town	
12	Dorchester	3–2	Newquay	
13	Exeter City	?–?	Marjons	
14	Gravesend & Northfleet	3–2	Slough	
15	Gretna	11–0	Bolton Ambassadors	
16	Hastings Town	2–3	Crowborough Athletic	

Tie	Home team (tier)	Score	Away team (tier)	Att.
17	Killingworth YPC	4–2	Stockport Celtic	
18	Launton	0–7	Malling	
19	Leicester City	5–0	Pearl	
20	Liverpool Feds	3–0	Penrith Sapphires	
21	Luton Town Belles	5–2	Stocklake	
22	Newport Pagnell Town	0–10	Redhill	
23	North Staffs	0–4	Belper Town	
24	Rover Oxford	8–0	Launceston	
25	Rushden & Diamonds	4–1	Cambridge United	
26	Thatcham Town	1–12	Caversham	
27	Thorpe United	5–1	Steel City Wanderers	
28	Tring Athletic	0–5	Barnet Copthall	
29	University of Birmingham	2–3	Oadby Town	
30	Warrington Grange	2–5	Bury	
31	Wimborne Town	2–4	Bournemouth Town	
32	Wisbech Town	0–13	Tamworth	
33	Woking	1–4	Redbridge Raiders	

== First round proper ==
All games were scheduled for 28 October and 4 November 2001.

Tie	Home team (tier)	Score	Away team (tier)	Att.
1	Bedford Town Bells	6–1	Gravesend & Northfleet	
2	Billingham	?–?	Liverpool Feds	
3	Bournemouth Town	1–9	Bristol City	
4	Bury	3–5	Parkgate	
5	Cambridge University	3–1	Belper Town	
6	Caversham	0–1	Hampton	
7	Chelmsford City	3–2 (a.e.t.)	Charlton	
8	Chesham United	1–3	Enfield	
9	Chester City	3–1	Blackburn Rovers	
10	Chester Le Street Town	0–1	Blackpool Wren Rovers	
11	Crowborough Athletic	5–2	Brentford	
12	Denham United	2–4	Redhill	
13	Derby County	1–4	Stafford Rangers	
14	Dorchester	1–3	Clevedon	
15	Exeter City	3–0	Keynsham Town	
16	Gillingham	2–1	Colney Heath	
17	Highfield Rangers	7–0	Oadby Town	
18	Huddersfield Town	1–0	Thorpe United	
19	Ilkeston	0–1	Leicester City	
20	Killingworth YPC	4–2	Leeds City Vixens	

Tie	Home team (tier)	Score	Away team (tier)	Att.
21	Lincoln City	7–1	Telford United	
22	Manchester United	2–1	Barnsley	
23	Middlesbrough	2–0	Bradford City	
24	Newcastle	4–0	Bolton Wanderers	
25	Peterborough United	2–2 (6–5 p)	Norwich City Racers	
26	Plymouth Argyle	0–6	Newton Abbot	
27	Port Vale	4–0	Loughborough	
28	Reading Royals	1–3	Reading	
29	Redbridge Raiders	4–0	Luton Town Belles	
30	Rover Oxford	0–3	Portsmouth	
31	Rushden & Diamonds	1–0	Tamworth	
32	Shrewsbury Town	1–4	Chesterfield	
33	Southampton	1–4	Yeovil Town	
34	Stockport County	5–2	Gretna	
35	Stowmarket	5–1	Lichfield Diamonds	
36	Swindon Town	3–4	Cardiff City	
37	Watford	4–0	Barnet Copthall	
38	West Ham United	4–1	Abbey Rangers	
39	Whitehawk	3–1	Malling	
Bye: Loughborough Students

== Second round proper ==
All games were originally scheduled for 11 November 2001.

Tie	Home team (tier)	Score	Away team (tier)	Att.
1	Bristol City	5–1	Reading	
2	Cambridge University	4–0	Stafford Rangers	
3	Chesterfield	1–3	Leicester City	
4	Crowborough Athletic	3–5 (a.e.t.)	Redbridge Raiders	
5	Exeter City	2–1 (a.e.t.)	Cardiff City	
6	Hampton	3–2	Chelmsford City	
7	Huddersfield Town	3–1	Blackpool Wren Rovers	
8	Lincoln City	3–1	Highfield Rangers	
9	Loughborough Students	7–1	Peterborough United	
10	Manchester United	0–1	Liverpool Feds	

Tie	Home team (tier)	Score	Away team (tier)	Att.
11	Middlesbrough	2–3 (a.e.t.)	Chester City	
12	Newcastle	5–2	Parkgate	
13	Newton Abbot	0–3	Yeovil Town	
14	Port Vale	0–2	Rushden & Diamonds	
15	Portsmouth	4–1	Clevedon	
16	Redhill	4–1	Gillingham	
17	Stockport County	4–1 (a.e.t.)	Killingworth YPC	
18	Stowmarket	2–1	Bedford Town Bells	
19	Watford	1–2	Enfield	
20	Whitehawk	0–2	West Ham United	

== Third round proper ==
All games were originally scheduled for 9 and 16 December 2001

Tie	Home team (tier)	Score	Away team (tier)	Att.
1	Bristol City	2–6	Bristol Rovers	
2	Chester City	1–2	Newcastle	
3	Enfield	6–4 (a.e.t.)	Barking	
4	Fulham	12–0	Newport County	
5	Hampton	2–2 (3–2 p)	Yeovil Town	
6	Huddersfield Town	1–2	Birmingham City	
7	Ilkeston Town	1–3	Oldham Curzon	
8	Ipswich Town	0–2	Chelsea	
9	Langford	4–1	Barnet	
10	Liverpool	0–1	Garswood Saints	
11	Liverpool Feds	0–1	Lincoln City	

Tie	Home team (tier)	Score	Away team (tier)	Att.
12	Loughborough Students	4–3	Aston Villa	
13	Manchester City	2–3	Bangor City	
14	Millwall Lionesses	H–W	Stowmarket	
Walkover for Millwall Lionesses.
15	North Notts	1–4 (a.e.t.)	Stockport County	
16	Queens Park Rangers	0–3	Portsmouth	
17	Redbridge Raiders	1–0	West Ham United	
18	Redhill	4–0	Berkhamsted Town	
19	Rushden & Diamonds	3–6	Coventry City	
20	Sheffield Wednesday	3–0	Cambridge University	
21	Wimbledon	1–3	Exeter City	
22	Wolverhampton Wanderers	1–0	Leicester City	

== Fourth round proper ==
All games were originally scheduled for 6, 13 and 20 January 2002.

6 January 2002	Bristol Rovers (2)	2–4	Everton (1)	Bristol
	Curtis 66'	Report	Barr 5', 83'; Whewell 62'	Stadium: Memorial Stadium

6 January 2002	Chelsea (2)	0–1	Enfield (3)
		Report	Buffery 42'

6 January 2002	Exeter City (4)	0–1	Coventry City (2)	Exeter
		Report	Goal	Stadium: St James Park; Attendance: 680

6 January 2002	Hampton (3)	0–1	Lincoln City (2)	Hampton
		Report	Goal	Stadium: Beveree

6 January 2002	Millwall Lionesses (2)	2–3 (a.e.t.)	Barry Town (1)
	Buckley; Mason	Report	Martyn; Melville; Ashford 113'

6 January 2002	Oldham Curzon (2)	4–0	Stockport County (3)
	Goal	Report

6 January 2002	Redbridge Raiders (3)	1–3	Wolverhampton Wanderers (2)	Ilford
	Goal	Report	Westwood; Booker; Slucett	Stadium: Cricklefield Stadium; Attendance: 41

6 January 2002	Southampton Saints (1)	3–1	Portsmouth (3)	Totton
	Wilding; Nwajei; Cottier 90'	Report	Niven 49'	Stadium: Testwood Stadium; Attendance: 300

13 January 2002	Charlton Athletic (1)	3–0	Bangor City (2)
	Goal	Report

13 January 2002	Garswood Saints (2)	5–0	Redhill (4)
	Bell	Report

13 January 2002	Loughborough Students (4)	0–7	Arsenal (1)
		Report	Ludlow 12', 50'; Grant 52', 81'; 60' (o.g.); Spacey 76'; Maggs 81'

13 January 2002	Newcastle United (3)	2–4 (a.e.t.)	Leeds United (1)
	Goal	Report	Goal

13 January 2002	Sheffield Wednesday (2)	2–2 (a.e.t.) (2–4 p)	Langford (2)
	Goal	Report	Goal
	Penalties
	Penalty scored Penalty missed		Penalty scored

13 January 2002	Tranmere Rovers (1)	4–2	Sunderland (2)	Heswall
	Smith	Report	Goal	Stadium: Gayton Park

20 January 2002	Birmingham City (2)	0–5	Fulham (2)	Tyburn
		Report	Pettersen; Haugenes; Duncan	Stadium: Hollyfields Conference and Sports Centre; Referee: Nigel Christopher

20 January 2002	Brighton & Hove Albion (1)	2–5	Doncaster Belles (1)	Brighton
	Arnold; Hodges	Report	Garside; Handley; Burke	Stadium: Withdean Stadium

== Fifth round proper ==
All games were played on 27 January, 3, 10 and 17 February 2002.

27 January 2002	Langford (2)	0–7	Charlton Athletic (1)
		Report	Osborne 1'; Broadhurst; Lorton; Langrish; Williams; Hunn

27 January 2002	Lincoln City (2)	2–7	Everton (1)	Lincoln
	Duxbury 5'; Priestley	Report	Barr 22'; Whewell; Mason	Stadium: Sincil Bank

3 February 2002	Arsenal (1)	3–0	Leeds United (1)	Borehamwood
	Pealing 38'; Banks 44'; Ludlow 80'	Report		Stadium: Meadow Park

3 February 2002	Coventry City (2)	0–11	Fulham (2)	Nuneaton
		Report	Goal	Stadium: Pingles Stadium

10 February 2002	Barry Town (1)	0–1	Doncaster Belles (1)	Barry
		Report	Goal	Stadium: Jenner Park Stadium

10 February 2002	Southampton Saints (1)	1–2	Oldham Curzon (2)	Totton
	Goal	Report	Goal	Stadium: Testwood Stadium; Referee: Bill Savill (Surrey)

10 February 2002	Tranmere Rovers (1)	4–1	Wolverhampton Wanderers (2)	Heswall
	Goal	Report	Goal	Stadium: Gayton Park

17 February 2002	Garswood Saints (2)	3–2	Enfield (3)
	Bostock; Johnson; Bell	Report	Goal

== Quarter–finals ==
All games were played on 10 and 17 February and 10 March 2002.

10 February 2002	Everton (2)	0–4	Fulham (1)	Crosby
		Report	Haugenes 43' (pen.) 53'; Pettersen 73', 85'	Stadium: Rossett Park

17 February 2002	Doncaster Belles (1)	2–1	Arsenal (1)	Doncaster
	Handley 17'; Burke 30'	Report	Spacey 53'	Stadium: Belle Vue Stadium; Referee: J Drew (Lincolnshire)

17 February 2002	Tranmere Rovers (1)	6–1	Curzon Ashton (2)
	Burns; McLeod; Taylor	Report	Maylett 83'

10 March 2002	Garswood Saints (2)	0–4	Charlton Athletic (1)
		Report	Walker; Broadhurst; Lorton (pen.)

== Semi–finals ==
All games were played on 31 March 2002.

31 March 2002	Fulham (2)	4–1	Charlton Athletic (1)	Woking
	Pettersen 45'; Moore 80'	Report	Williams	Stadium: Kingfield Stadium; Attendance: 1,249; Referee: Janie Frampton (Blandford)

31 March 2002	Tranmere Rovers (1)	1–3	Doncaster Belles (1)	Tranmere
	Hooley 28' (pen.)	Report	Hunt 75'; Walker 83', 90'	Stadium: Prenton Park; Attendance: 1,065; Referee: Amy Raynor (Loughborough)

== Final ==
6 May 2002
13:00 BST

Doncaster Belles	1–2	Fulham
Handley 61'	Report	Yankey 55'; Chapman 60'

Selhurst Park, London
Attendance: 10,124
Referee: Eddie Evans (Manchester)
