= 2001–02 FA Women's Premier League Cup =

Tournament details
- Country: England

Final positions
- Champions: Fulham
- Runners-up: Birmingham City

The 2001–02 FA Women's Premier League Cup was the 11th staging of the FA Women's Premier League Cup, a knockout competition for England's top 36 women's football clubs.

The tournament was won by Fulham, who beat Birmingham City 7–1 in the final.

== Results ==
=== Qualifying round ===
Matches were played on 9 September 2001.

9 September 2001	Fulham (S)	12–0	Millwall Lionesses (S)
	Pettersen; Chapman; Yankey; Moore; Haugenes; Jerray-Silver; Duncan	Report

9 September 2001	Wimbledon (S)	2–0	Coventry City (NO)
	Hughes; Smith	Report

=== First round ===
Matches were played on 23 and 30 September and 7 October 2001.

23 September 2001	Arsenal (NA)	8–0	Ipswich Town (S)
	Ludlow 16'; Grant 42', 59'; Spacey 44', 57'; Banks 70', 75', 88'	Report

23 September 2001	Barking (S)	6–1	North Notts (NO)
	Goal	Report	Goal

23 September 2001	Berkhamsted Town (S)	0–6	Barry Town (NA)
		Report	Goal

23 September 2001	Birmingham City (NO)	4–0	Barnet (S)
	Goal	Report

23 September 2001	Everton (NA)	3–1 (a.e.t.)	Bristol Rovers (S)
	Byrne (pen.); Marley	Report	Dean 49'

23 September 2001	Garswood Saints (NO)	1–1 (a.e.t.) (1–4 p)	Liverpool (NO)
	Goal	Report	Goal
	Penalties
	Penalty scored Penalty missed		Penalty scored

23 September 2001	Ilkeston Town (NO)	2–0	Brighton & Hove Albion (NA)
	Eaves; Saggers	Report

23 September 2001	Langford (S)	2–3	Chelsea (S)
	Goal	Report	Goal

23 September 2001	Manchester City (NO)	0–2	Southampton Saints (NA)
		Report	Goal

23 September 2001	Oldham Curzon (NO)	3–6 (a.e.t.)	Sheffield Wednesday (NO)
	Goal	Report	Goal

23 September 2001	Tranmere Rovers (NA)	5–1	Newport County (S)
	Hooley; Waring; Burns; Holden	Report	Jones

23 September 2001	Wimbledon (S)	1–2	Bangor City (NO)
	Goal	Report	Goal

23 September 2001	Wolverhampton Wanderers (NO)	1–3	Sunderland (NA)
	McCann	Report	Twaddle; Alsanea

30 September 2001	Aston Villa (NO)	2–5	Doncaster Belles (NA)
	Goal	Report	Exley; Walker; Embleton; Burke

30 September 2001	Queens Park Rangers (S)	0–7	Charlton Athletic (NA)
		Report	Lorton; Williams

7 October 2001	Fulham (S)	8–0	Leeds United (NA)
	Goal	Report

=== Second round ===
Matches were played on 28 October and 4 and 28 November 2001.

28 October 2001	Arsenal (NA)	8–1	Sunderland (NA)	Borehamwood
	White 33'; Maggs 44', 63', 81'; Spacey 53', 71'; Stoney 62'; Ogawa 76'	Report	Lanaghan 67'	Stadium: Meadow Park

28 October 2001	Bangor City (NO)	0–1	Birmingham City (NO)
		Report	McLeod

28 October 2001	Charlton Athletic (NA)	1–5	Fulham (S)
	Williams	Report	Pettersen; Jerray-Silver; Haugenes

28 October 2001	Doncaster Belles (NA)	5–0	Barking (S)
	Burke; Exley; Easton; Garside; Handley	Report

28 October 2001	Sheffield Wednesday (NO)	1–2	Ilkeston Town (NO)
	Goal	Report	Mee; Wale

28 October 2001	Southampton Saints (NA)	4–2	Chelsea (S)
	Wilding; Poore; Nwajei	Report	Ede; Stanghon

4 November 2001	Tranmere Rovers (NA)	0–1 (a.e.t.)	Barry Town (NA)
		Report	Williams 120'

11 November 2001	Everton (NA)	2–0	Liverpool (NO)
	Krivinskas 71' (pen.); Barr 75'	Report

=== Quarter-finals ===
Matches were played on 11 and 25 November and 2 and 16 December 2001.

11 November 2001	Barry Town (NA)	2–4	Arsenal (NA)
	Jones 54'; Saunders 80'	Report	Banks 8', 38'; C. Grant 23', 45'

25 November 2001	Ilkeston Town (NO)	0–4	Birmingham City (NO)
		Report	Goal

2 December 2001	Doncaster Belles (NA)	3–1	Everton (NA)
	Walker 47'; Exley 51'; Handley 83'	Report	Nohl 6'

16 December 2001	Fulham (S)	9–1	Southampton Saints (NA)
	Pettersen; McArthur; Haugenes; Yankey; Chapman	Report	Nwajei

=== Semi-finals ===
Matches were played on 13 and 16 January 2002.

13 January 2002	Doncaster Belles (NA)	3–4	Birmingham City (NO)
	Handley; Gardside; Barr	Report	Ward 74'; McGuckin

16 January 2002	Fulham (S)	3–2 (a.e.t.)	Arsenal (NA)
	Yankey 43'; Duncan 62'; Pettersen 91'	Report	C. Grant 26'; Spacey 82'

=== Final ===
7 April 2002

Birmingham City	1–7	Fulham
McGuckin 66'	Report	Chapman 3', 90'; Haugenes 42', 61'; Bassett 67' (o.g.); Rahman 81'; Pettersen 86'

Adams Park, High Wycombe
