= 2002–03 FA Women's Premier League Cup =

Tournament details
- Country: England
- Dates: 8 September 2002 – 30 March 2003
- Teams: 33

Final positions
- Champions: Fulham
- Runners-up: Arsenal

The 2002–03 FA Women's Premier League Cup was the 12th staging of the FA Women's Premier League Cup, a knockout competition for England's top 36 women's football clubs.

The tournament was won by Fulham, who beat Arsenal in the final via penalty shootout.

== Results ==
The division each team play in is indicated in brackets after their name: (NA)=National Division; (NO)=Northern Division; (S)=Southern Division.

=== Qualifying round ===
Matches were played on 8 September 2002.

8 September 2002	Bristol City (S)	2–5	Aston Villa (NO)
	Goal	Report	Goal

8 September 2002	Langford (S)	2–1	Merthyr Tydfil (S)
	Goal	Report	Goal

=== First round ===
Matches were played on 29 September and 13 October 2002.

Oldham Curzon were given a bye for the next round.

29 September 2002	Barking (S)	1–4	Garswood Saints (NO)
	Goal	Report	Goal

29 September 2002	Brigton & Hove Albion (NA)	2–0	Barnet (S)
	Goal	Report

29 September 2002	Bristol Rovers (S)	3–0	Southampton Saints (NA)
	Goal	Report

29 September 2002	Charlton Athletic (NA)	2–0	Enfield (S)
	Goal	Report

29 September 2002	Doncaster Belles (NA)	3–0	Everton (NA)
	Easton; Hunt; Walker 80'	Report

29 September 2002	Fulham (NA)	6–2	Langford (SO)
	Goal	Report	Goal

29 September 2002	Lincoln City (NO)	2–4	Leeds United (NA)
	Goal	Report	Goal

29 September 2002	Manchester City (NO)	5–2	Ilkeston Town (NO)
	Goal	Report	Goal

29 September 2002	Middlesbrough (NO)	0–1	Ipswich Town (S)
		Report	Goal

29 September 2002	Sunderland (NO)	4–0	Chelsea (S)
	Goal	Report

29 September 2002	Tranmere Rovers (NA)	4–0	Millwall Lionesses (S)
	Goal	Report

29 September 2002	Wolverhampton Wanderers (NO)	2–2 (a.e.t.) (1–4 p)	Liverpool (NO)
	Goal	Report	Goal
	Penalties
	Penalty scored Penalty missed		Penalty scored

13 October 2002	Arsenal (NA)	11–0	Sheffield Wednesday (NO)
	Ludlow; Banks; Maggs; Ritchie; (o.g.)	Report

13 October 2002	Bangor City (NO)	2–3	Aston Villa (NO)
	Goal	Report	Goal

13 October 2002	Wimbledon (SO)	0–4	Birmingham City (NA)
		Report	Goal

=== Second round ===
Matches were played on 27 October and 11 November 2002.

27 October 2002	Brighton & Hove Albion (NA)	1–4	Birmingham City (NA)
	Stainer	Report	McGuckin; Lacey; Potter

27 October 2002	Bristol Rovers (S)	2–0	Oldham Curzon (NO)
	8' (o.g.); Williams 60'	Report

27 October 2002	Charlton Athletic (NA)	10–1	Garswood Saints (NO)
	Lorton; Walker; Barr	Report	Goal

27 October 2002	Doncaster Belles (NA)	2–1	Manchester City (NO)
	Exley; Ward	Report	Stokes 90'

27 October 2002	Fulham (NA)	12–0	Liverpool (NO)
	Moore; Lipscombe; Haugenes; McArthur	Report

27 October 2002	Sunderland (NO)	2–3	Aston Villa (NO)
	Scorer; O'Neil	Report	Smith; Courtney 80'

10 November 2002	Arsenal (NA)	3–0	Leeds United (NA)
	Britton 7' (o.g.); Grant 18'; Maggs 60'	Report

10 November 2002	Tranmere Rovers (NA)	6–0	Ipswich Town (S)
	Goal	Report

=== Quarter-finals ===
Matches were played on 24 November and 1 December 2002.

24 November 2002	Aston Villa (NO)	1–0	Charlton Athletic (NA)
14:00	Sharrad 78'	Report

24 November 2002	Fulham (NA)	5–0	Birmingham City (NA)
14:00	Moore; McArthur; Nwajei; Duncan	Report

24 November 2002	Doncaster Belles (NA)	7–0	Bristol Rovers (S)
14:00	Walker 28'; Handley 50'; Culvin; Easton; Ward; Hunt	Report

1 December 2002	Arsenal (NA)	1–0	Tranmere Rovers (NA)
14:00	Martyn 17'	Report

=== Semi-finals ===
Matches were played on 29 January and 2 February 2003.

29 January 2003	Aston Villa (NO)	1–2	Fulham (NA)
14:00	Carter 15'	Report	Pedersen 25'; McArthur 84'

2 February 2003	Doncaster Belles (NA)	1–2	Arsenal (NA)
14:00	Walker 67' (pen.)	Report	Ludlow 3', 23'

=== Final ===
30 March 2003
14:00 BST

Fulham	1–1 (a.e.t.)	Arsenal
Yankey 89'	Report	Grant 90'
Penalties
Pedersen (penalty missed); Spacey (penalty scored); Yankey (penalty missed); Unitt (penalty missed); McArthur (penalty scored); Jerray-Silver (penalty scored)	3–2	(penalty scored) Banks; (penalty scored) Wheatley; (penalty missed) Fletcher; (penalty missed) Pealling; (penalty missed) Williams; (penalty missed) Maggs

County Ground, Swindon
Attendance: 2,220
