= Gaute Haugenes =

Norwegian football manager

Managerial career
- Years: Team
- Fulham L.F.C.
- Amazon Grimstad

Gaute Haugenes is a Norwegian professional football manager who is best known for coaching Fulham L.F.C.

== Career ==
In 2002 Gaute Haugenes was hired as the coach for Fulham, in 2002 Haugenes won the FA Cup with Fulham. Gaute Haugenes resigned from Fulham at the end of the 2003 season when The Football Association decided against making the FA Women's National League players full time professionals. In 2009 Haugenes was hired by Amazon Grimstad.

In 2024, when former Fulham owner Mohamed Al-Fayed was accused posthumously of sex offences at his Harrods department store, Haugenes told the BBC that Fulham staff members would not leave women players unaccompanied around Al-Fayed.

== Personal life ==
Gaute Haugenes is married to former footballer Margunn Haugenes.

== Honours ==
Fulham

- FA Women's Premier League National Division: 2002–03
- FA Women's Cup: 2002 2003
- FA Women's Premier League Cup: 2002, 2003
