= Lene Terp =

Danish footballer (born 1973)

Personal information
- Full name: Lene Bjerning Terp
- Date of birth: 15 April 1973 (age 53)
- Place of birth: Hellevad, Denmark
- Position: Defender

Youth career
- Hellevad IF
- Bolderslev B1950
- 1988–1991: Kolding B

College career
Years	Team	Apps	(Gls)
1995	Lynn Fighting Knights		

Senior career*
Years	Team	Apps	(Gls)
1993–1996	Vejle B	108	
1997–2001	OB		
2001–2002	Fulham		
2002–2003	OB		

International career
1993–2003	Denmark	105	(4)

Managerial career
- 2005–2008: SønderjyskE
- 2013–2016: Kolding IF
- 2016–2017: Denmark (assistant) (Note: Terp agreed to be caretaker assistant for Katrine Pedersen who was on maternity leave.)
- 2021–2023: Faroe Islands
- 2023–2026: Fortuna Hjørring
- * Club domestic league appearances and goals

Lene Bjerning Terp (born 15 April 1973) is a Danish professional football manager and former player. She was most recently the manager of Fortuna Hjørring, and has previously coached A-Liga club Kolding IF (then-KoldingQ) and the Faroe Islands national team. Terp played as a defender, captaining the Danish national team from 1998 until her player retirement in 2003. She represented Danish A-Liga clubs Kolding B, Vejle BK, and OB, and turned professional in 2001 with then-2nd tier English club Fulham. In November 2025, Terp was inducted into the Danish Football Hall of Fame.

Terp has reached a lot of historic milestones in Danish women's football. She was the first female player to reach 100 matches for the Danish national team, and the first Danish woman to obtain the UEFA Pro Licence required to coach at the highest level. She is one of the first players to play professionally, and the only woman to have been nominated by her colleagues for the title of Best Danish Football Coach, where she placed 5th, the only woman to have ever been considered.

== Youth career ==
Terp began her playing career at 15 years old with Kolding B in 1988, where she played until 1991 ending her time with the club at 18 years old.

== Club career ==
Terp started her senior career in 1993 with A-Liga club Vejle BK, during which she also spent a year with Lynn University in 1995. In 1997 she moved on to OB where she played for four years. In 2001 Terp got her first full-time professional contract with the then-English football 2nd tier club Fulham, with which Terp won promotion to the then-top tier as well as the 2002 FA Cup. She was with Fulham for one season, before returning to OB for another year, retiring from her active playing career in 2003.

== International career ==
Terp won 105 caps for Denmark. She was named in the FIFA All-Star team for the 1999 FIFA Women's World Cup.

== Managerial career ==
Terp worked as an assistant coach with the Michigan Wolverines in 2009. She gained her UEFA Pro Licence in 2013, the first woman in Denmark to do so and is one of only five women in Denmark to obtain one. On 1 July 2023, Terp became the head coach for Danish A-Liga club Fortuna Hjørring. Terp led them to win the league in the 2024–25 season, the first win in five years and their 12th title, which saw Fortuna draw level with rivals Brøndby for most titles in the top flight. Fortuna also won the 2025 Danish Cup securing them "the Double". For her accomplishments in the 2024–25 season, Terp was voted the fifth best manager in the country by fellow managers, the highest placed female coach in the ranking and the first woman ever to place in the ranking.

== Honours ==
=== Player ===
Fulham

- FA Cup: 2001–02

=== Managerial ===
Fortuna Hjørring

- A-Liga: 2024–25
- Danish Cup: 2024–25

Individual

- 2025 Best Danish Football Coach: 5th
- Danish Football Hall of Fame: 2025
