= 2002–03 FA Women's Cup =

Tournament details
- Country: England; Wales

Final positions
- Champions: Fulham
- Runners-up: Charlton Athletic
- Penalty shoot-outs do not count towards the total number of goals.

The 2002–03 FA Women's Cup was an association football knockout tournament for women's teams, held between 8 September 2002 and 5 May 2003. It was the 33rd season of the FA Women's Cup and was won by Fulham, who defeated Charlton Athletic in the final. The tournament consisted of two qualifying rounds and eight rounds of competition proper.

All match results and dates from the Women's FA Cup Website.

== First round qualifying ==
All games were played on 8 September 2002.

Tie	Home team (tier)	Score	Away team (tier)	Att.
1	Abbey Rangers	0–7	Hitchin Town	
2	Alphington	2–8	Okeford United	
3	Barwell	2–3	Kidderminster Harriers	
4	Berkshire Sports	A–W	Luton Town Belles	
Walkover for Luton Town Belles
5	Billericay Town	2–1 (a.e.t.)	Barnet Copthall	
6	Blyth Town	2–4	Southport	
7	Bradford City	1–3	Preston North End	
8	Brentford	5–3	Haywards Heath Town	
9	Bury	H–W	Bolton Wanderers (Supporters)	
Walkover for Bury
10	Cogan Coronation	1–0	Southampton	
11	Colney Heath	3–0	Basildon United	
12	Crystal Palace	7–0	Leighton Linslade	
13	Dagenham & Redbridge	18–0	Brentwood Town	
14	Derby County	1–2	Great Wyrley	
15	Doncaster Rovers	H–W	Morley Spurs	
Walkover for Doncaster Rovers.
16	Droylsden	7–1	Greyhound Gunners	
17	Durham City	4–3	Ossett Albion	
18	East Durham	23–0	Bolton Ambassadors	
19	Hampton & Richmond Borough	1–10	Thatcham Town	
20	Haringey Borough	1–2	Woking	
21	Hastings Town	0–0 (4–3 p)	Royston Town	
22	Kesteven & Grantham	7–3	Stone Dominoes	
23	Killingworth YPC	3–1	Billingham	
24	Kirklees	0–4	Thorpe United	
25	Leafield Athletic	2–1	Belper Town	
26	Leicester City	13–0	Buxton	

Tie	Home team (tier)	Score	Away team (tier)	Att.
27	London Colney	2–1 (a.e.t.)	Slough	
28	London Ladies	1–6	Crowborough Athletic	
29	London Women	12–0	Sawbridgeworth Town	
30	Loughborough	6–1	South Normanton Athletic	
31	Nettleham	A–W	Northampton Town	
Walkover for Northampton Town.
32	North Ferriby United	7–3	Bolton Wanderers	
33	Oadby Town	1–3	Cambridge City	
34	Pearl	1–7	Rushden & Diamonds	
35	Penrith Sapphires	7–0	Gateshead Cleveland Hall	
36	Penzance	2–6 (a.e.t.)	Newquay	
37	Rover Oxford	H–W	Marjons	
Walkover for Rover Oxford.
38	South Durham Royals	1–12	Newsham Park Hospital	
39	Southam United	2–7	Wollaston Victoria	
40	Stockport Celtic	1–0 (a.e.t.)	Wigan	
41	Swindon Spitfires	2–3	Launceston	
42	Tadchester Albion	1–6	Chester Le Street Town	
43	Tameside Girls	3–4	Darlington Railway Athletic	
44	Torbay	15–0	Highridge United	
45	Tottenham Hotspur	2–2 (4–3 p)	Redhill	
46	Tring Athletic	4–0	Mansfield Road	
47	Viking Rangers	5–5 (2–3 p)	MK Wanderers	
48	Wadebridge Town	A–W	Corfe Hills United	
Walkover for Corfe Hills United.
49	Wardley Eagles	5–1	Nettleham	
50	Warrington Grange	5–3 (a.e.t.)	Corwen	
51	Windscale	0–4	Darwen	
52	Woodbridge Town	2–1	Caversham	
53	Wycombe Wanderers	1–3	Redbridge Raiders	

== Second round qualifying ==
All games were played on 29 September 2002.

Tie	Home team (tier)	Score	Away team (tier)	Att.
1	Billericay Town	1–5	Brentford	
2	Bury	0–10	East Durham	
3	Clapton Orient	2–0	Chiswick United	
4	Cogan Coronation	0–5	Torbay	
5	Crowborough Athletic	6–2	London Colney	
6	Dagenham & Redbridge	5–3 (a.e.t.)	Tottenham Hotspur	
7	Darlington Railway Athletic	4–2	Killingworth YPC	
8	Doncaster Rovers	0–1	Chester Le Street Town	
9	Droylsden	1–5	Darwen	
10	Durham City	1–0	Wardley Eagles	
11	Exeter Rangers	1–2	Keynsham Town	
12	Great Wyrley	1–0	Tamworth	
13	Hastings Town	1–5	Crystal Palace	
14	Haywood United	3–1	Thatcham Town	
15	Kesteven & Grantham	2–0	Cambridge United	
16	Launceston	4–7	Okeford United	

Tie	Home team (tier)	Score	Away team (tier)	Att.
17	Leicester City	7–1	Kidderminster Harriers	
18	Loughborough	1–0	Leafield Athletic	
19	MK Wanderers	2–4 (a.e.t.)	Luton Town Belles	
20	Newquay	8–0	Corfe Hills United	
21	Newsham Park Hospital	3–1	North Ferriby United	
22	Northampton Town	5–0	Wollaston Victoria	
23	Penrith Sapphires	1–2	Preston North End	
24	Redbridge Raiders	10–1	Whitehawk	
25	Rover Oxford	4–1	Plymouth Oak Villa	
26	Rushden & Diamonds	4–2	Cambridge City	
27	Stockport Celtic	0–4	Hopwood	
28	Thame United	3–5	Hitchin Town	
29	Thorpe United	H–W	Kader	
Walkover for Thorpe United.
30	Tring Athletic	1–1 (?–? p)	Woodbridge Town	
31	Warrington Grange	2–3	Southport	
32	Westbourne	2–1	London Women	
33	Woking	4–2	Colney Heath	

== First round proper ==
All games were scheduled for 27 October and 3 November 2002.

Tie	Home team (tier)	Score	Away team (tier)	Att.
1	Aylesbury United	1–13	Watford	
2	Blackburn Rovers	6–0	Chesterfield	
3	Brentford	1–2	Stowmarket	
4	Cambridge University	3–0	Telford United	
5	Cardiff City	10–2	Okeford United	
6	Chesham United	0–2	Brook House	
7	Chester Le Street Town	4–2	Darwen	
8	Colchester United	4–0	Westbourne	
9	Dagenham & Redbridge	7–1	Tring Athletic	
10	Darlington Railway Athletic	1–3	Huddersfield Town	
11	Durham City	0–6	Newcastle	
12	Gillingham	2–1	Crystal Palace	
13	Gretna	3–6	Manchester United	
14	Haywood United	4–0	Clapton Orient	
15	Highfield Rangers	5–6	Lichfield Diamonds	
16	Hitchin Town	0–3	Reading	
17	Ilkeston	6–2	Kesteven & Grantham	
18	Leicester City	4–1	Stafford Rangers	
19	Loughborough Students	1–0	Coventry City	
20	Luton Town Belles	1–2	Denham United	

Tie	Home team (tier)	Score	Away team (tier)	Att.
21	Newquay	7–2	Keynsham Town	
22	Newsham Park Hospital	0–2	East Durham	
23	Newton Abbot	4–3	Exeter City	
24	Parkgate	5–4	Liverpool Feds	
25	Peterborough United	2–1	Northampton Town	
26	Plymouth Argyle	0–4	Torbay	
27	Portsmouth	3–0	Bedford Town Bells	
28	Preston North End	2–3	Barnsley	
29	Queens Park Rangers	3–0	Crowborough Athletic	
30	Redbridge Raiders	H–W	Bridgnorth Spartans	
Walkover for Redbridge Raiders.
31	Rover Oxford	2–1	Swindon Town	
32	Rushden & Diamonds	4–1	Loughborough	
33	Scunthorpe United	5–1	Leeds City Vixens	
34	Shrewsbury Town	10–1	Great Wyrley	
35	Southport	0–2	Chester City	
36	Stockport County	4–0	Blackpool Wren Rovers	
37	Thorpe United	5–1	Hopwood	
38	West Ham United	0–1	Norwich City Racers	
39	Woking	2–2 (2–3 p)	Reading Royals	
40	Yeovil Town	0–1	Clevedon	

== Second round proper ==
All games were originally scheduled for 10 and 17 November 2002.

Tie	Home team (tier)	Score	Away team (tier)	Att.
1	Blackburn Rovers	4–0	Barnsley	
2	Cambridge University	3–4	Lichfield Diamonds	
3	Cardiff City	2–1	Clevedon	
4	Chester City	2–0	Huddersfield Town	
5	Dagenham & Redbridge	3–0	Brook House	
6	Denham United	0–1	Portsmouth	
7	East Durham	2–1	Stockport County	
8	Haywood United	2–3	Gillingham	
9	Leicester City	5–1	Loughborough Students	
10	Manchester United	8–0	Scunthorpe United	

Tie	Home team (tier)	Score	Away team (tier)	Att.
11	Newcastle	7–1	Chester Le Street Town	
12	Newquay	4–2	Newton Abbot	
13	Norwich City Racers	2–1	Stowmarket	
14	Parkgate	4–1	Thorpe United	
15	Peterborough United	1–6	Ilkeston	
16	Queens Park Rangers	0–1	Watford	
17	Reading Royals	8–1	Colchester United	
18	Redbridge Raiders	1–0	Reading	
19	Rushden & Diamonds	5–2	Shrewsbury Town	
20	Torbay	2–0	Rover Oxford	

== Third round proper ==
All games were originally scheduled for 8, 15 and 29 December 2002

Tie	Home team (tier)	Score	Away team (tier)	Att.
1	Barking	1–2	Redbridge Raiders	
2	Blackburn Rovers	4–0	Bangor City	
3	Bristol City	2–0	Millwall Lionesses	
4	Chelsea	3–1	Langford	
5	Dagenham & Redbridge	0–4	Bristol Rovers	
6	East Durham	7–0	Garswood Saints	
7	Enfield	0–1	Cardiff City	
8	Gillingham	1–3	Torbay	
9	Leicester City	1–0 (a.e.t.)	Manchester City	
10	Lincoln City	4–1	Ilkeston	
11	Liverpool	5–0	Chester City	

Tie	Home team (tier)	Score	Away team (tier)	Att.
12	Manchester United	3–0	Ilkeston Town	
13	Merthyr Tydfil	2–1	Norwich City Racers	
14	Middlesbrough	5–1	Lichfield Diamonds	
15	Newcastle	3–0	Rushden & Diamonds	
16	Newquay	1–4	Watford	
17	Oldham Curzon	2–0	Sunderland	
18	Parkgate	2–7	Aston Villa	
19	Portsmouth	3–4	Ipswich Town	
20	Reading Royals	2–1	Wimbledon	
21	Wolverhampton Wanderers	5–0	Sheffield Wednesday	

== Fourth round proper ==
All games were originally scheduled for 5, 12, 19 and 23 January 2003.

5 January 2003	Arsenal (1)	2–0	Tranmere Rovers (1)	St Albans
	Grant 14'; Ludlow 90'	Report		Stadium: Clarence Park

5 January 2003	Bristol City (2)	1–1 (a.e.t.) (3–4 p)	Oldham Curzon (2)
	Goal	Report	Goal
	Penalties
	Penalty missed Penalty scored		Penalty missed Penalty scored

5 January 2003	Cardiff City (3)	2–2 (a.e.t.) (1–2 p)	Wolverhampton Wanderers (2)
	Goal	Report	Goal
	Penalties
	Penalty scored Penalty missed		Penalty missed Penalty scored

5 January 2003	Fulham (1)	2–0	Doncaster Belles (1)	Woking
	Goal	Report		Stadium: Kingfield Stadium

5 Janaury 2003	Redbridge Raiders (4)	0–2	Ipswich Town (2)	Ilford
		Report	Goal	Stadium: Cricklefields Sports Ground

5 January 2003	Southampton Saints (1)	2–1	Everton (1)
	Goal	Report	Goal

5 January 2003	Torbay (4)	0–2	Manchester United (3)
		Report	Goal

12 January 2003	Leeds United (1)	4–0	Merthyr Tydfil (2)
	Goal	Report

12 January 2003	Newcastle United (3)	0–5	Birmingham City (1)
		Report	Goal

19 January 2003	Barnet (2)	1–6	East Durham (4)
	Goal	Report	Goal

19 January 2003	Blackburn Rovers (3)	3–2	Middlesbrough (2)
	Goal	Report	Goal

19 January 2003	Bristol Rovers (2)	4–3	Chelsea (2)	Bristol
	Williams; Curtis 70', 90'	Report	Regali; White 75'	Stadium: Memorial Stadium; Referee: S Moggs

19 January 2003	Charlton Athletic (1)	4–0	Brighton & Hove Albion (1)
	Abbot 19'; Walker 55'; Barr 69', 74'	Report

19 January 2003	Reading Royals (3)	2–3	Aston Villa (2)
	Heapy; Strudley 70'	Report	Carter; Hawkins

19 January 2003	Watford (3)	1–1 (a.e.t.) (8–7 p)	Liverpool (2)
	Goal	Report	Hart 1'
	Penalties
	Penalty scored		Penalty scored Penalty missed

23 January 2003	Lincoln City (2)	2–1	Leicester City (4)
	Goal	Report	Goal

== Fifth round proper ==
All games were played on 26 January and 2 February 2003.

26 January 2003	Birmingham City (1)	7–2	Blackburn Rovers (3)
	Goal	Report	Goal

26 January 2003	Bristol Rovers (2)	1–1 (3–1 p)	Southampton Saints (1)
	Goal	Report	Goal
	Penalties
	Penalty missed Penalty scored		Penalty missed Penalty scored

26 January 2003	East Durham (4)	1–3	Fulham (1)	Peterlee
	Goal	Report	Goal	Stadium: East Durham College

26 January 2003	Ipswich Town (2)	2–3	Oldham Curzon (2)	Woodbridge, Suffolk
	Goal	Report	Goal	Stadium: Notcutts Park

26 January 2003	Lincoln City (2)	2–0	Watford (3)
	Goal	Report

26 January 2003	Manchester United (3)	0–8	Charlton Athletic (1)	Broughton
		Report	Goal	Stadium: The Cliff

26 January 2003	Wolverhampton Wanderers (2)	0–4	Arsenal
		Report	Ludlow; Banks

2 February 2003	Leeds United (1)	0–3	Aston Villa (2)	Altofts
		Report	Smith 10'; Sharrad 70'; Davies 75'	Stadium: Altofts Sports Ground

== Quarter–finals ==
All games were played on 8 and 9 February 2003.

8 February 2003	Arsenal (1)	6–0	Aston Villa (2)	Bishop's Stortford
14:00 GMT	Banks 10', 54'; Pealling 18'; Ludlow 33', 78'; Scott 83'	Report		Stadium: Woodside Park

9 February 2003	Birmingham City (1)	1–3	Charlton Athletic (1)	Redditch
	Bassett 25'	Report	Barr 12'; Lorton; Whitter	Stadium: Valley Stadium

9 February 2003	Bristol Rovers (2)	3–2	Lincoln City (2)	Bristol
	Curtis 18', 30'; Cripps	Report	Burton; Asthorpe 72'	Stadium: Memorial Stadium

9 February 2003	Fulham (1)	1–0	Oldham Curzon (2)	Motspur Park
	Jerray-Silver 24'	Report		Stadium: Fulham Training Ground

== Semi–finals ==
All games were played on 23 February 2003.

23 February 2003	Bristol Rovers (2)	2–7	Fulham (1)	Bristol
	T. Williams 3'; Anderson 56'	Report	Nwajei 11'; Pedersen 31'; Haugenes 45'; Moore 54', 72'; Jerray-Silver 76'; Spacey 79'	Stadium: Memorial Stadium; Attendance: 2,442; Referee: Mark Asplen

23 February 2003	Charlton Athletic (1)	1–0	Arsenal (1)	Charlton
	Lorton 80' (pen.)	Report		Stadium: The Valley; Attendance: 3,031

== Final ==
5 May 2003
13:00 BST

Charlton Athletic	0–3	Fulham
	Report	Moore 18'; Hills 36' (o.g.); F. Williams 61' (o.g.)

Selhurst Park, London
Attendance: 10,389
Referee: George Cain (Liverpool)
