= 2003–04 Brighton & Hove Albion W.F.C. season =

Brighton & Hove Albion
2003-04 season
- Chairman: Dick Knight
- Premier Southern Division: 6th
- FA Cup: Third round

The 2003-04 Brighton & Hove Albion W.F.C season was in the FA Women's Premier Southern Division, a regional competition following the club's relegation from the Women's Premier League the previous season. Along with competing in the Southern Premier Division, the club also reached the third round proper of the Women's FA Cup.
