= Bowry =

Bowry is an English surname. Notable people with the surname include:

- Bobby Bowry (born 1971), English-born Kittian football player
- Daniel Bowry (born 1998), English football player
- Jody Bowry (born 1980), English football player
- Jude Bowry (born 2003), American football player

== See also ==
- Howry
