= Howrey (surname) =

Howrey is a surname. Notable people with the surname include:

- E. Philip Howrey (1937–2011), American economist
- Edward F. Howrey (1903–1996), Chair of the Federal Trade Commission, and founder of the law firm, Howrey
- Meg Howrey, half of the writing duo under the pseudonym Magnus Flyte

== See also ==
- Howry, a surname
