= 2002–03 Brighton & Hove Albion W.F.C. season =

Brighton & Hove Albion
2002-03 season
- Chairman: Dick Knight
- FA Women's Premier League: 10th
- FA Cup: Fourth round

The 2002-03 Brighton & Hove Albion W.F.C season was the women's team second season in the top flight of English football in the FA Women's Premier League, the highest level of the football pyramid. Along with competing in the Women's Premier League, the club also contested the FA Women's FA Cup and League Cup.

Brighton were relegated after finishing the season of the FA Women's Premier League in tenth place and would not return to the top tier of women's football until after the formation of the Women's Super League.
