= Sammy Howarth =

English footballer

Samantha Howarth
Personal information
- Full name: Samantha Howarth
- Date of birth: 1 February 1971 (age 55)
- Place of birth: Ashton-under-Lyne, England
- Positions: Defender; midfielder

Team information
- Current team: Southampton Women's F.C

Youth career
- Manchester Corinthians

Senior career*
Years	Team	Apps	(Gls)
- Liverpool
- Tranmere Rovers
2001–2003	Doncaster Belles		
2003–2007	Southampton Saints		
- AFC Wimbledon
- AFC Bournemouth
- Andover New Street

International career
1991–	England	8	(0)
- * Club domestic league appearances and goals

Samantha "Sammy" Howarth (born Samantha Hayward; 1 February 1971) is an English international footballer. She played in the FA Women's Premier League National Division with Liverpool, Doncaster Belles and Tranmere Rovers. As of 2013, she currently plays for Southampton Women's F.C.

== Football career ==
=== Club ===
Howarth played in the 1993–94 Women's FA Cup final for Knowsley United against Doncaster Belles. Eight years later she was an unused substitute for Doncaster Belles as they lost the 2002 final to Fulham.

=== International ===
In June 1991 Howarth won the first of five England caps in a friendly draw against Denmark in Nordby.

In November 2022, Howarth was recognized by The Football Association as one of the England national team's legacy players, and as the 89th women's player to be capped by England.
