= Marianne Pettersen =

Norwegian footballer (born 1975)

Personal information
- Full name: Marianne Iren Pettersen
- Date of birth: 12 April 1975 (age 51)
- Place of birth: Oslo, Norway
- Height: 5 ft 7 in (1.70 m)
- Position: Striker

Youth career
- Gjelleråsen

Senior career*
Years	Team	Apps	(Gls)
1997–1999	Asker	44	(59)
2000	Athene Moss	17	(19)
2001–2002	Fulham Ladies		
2002–2003	Asker	36	(36)
2007	Asker	17	(8)

International career
1994	Norway U20	10	(5)
1994–2003	Norway	98	(66)
Medal record
Women's football
Representing Norway
Gold medal – first place	2000 Sydney	Team competition
Bronze medal – third place	1996 Atlanta	Team competition
- * Club domestic league appearances and goals

Marianne Iren Pettersen (born 12 April 1975) is a Norwegian footballer. She was a striker for the club Asker, whom she joined from Gjelleråsen after the 1996 season, and became the top scorer with 36 goals in the 1998 season of 18 matches.

== Career ==
For the Norwegian national team, Pettersen debuted in 1994, scoring against Italy.

In the 1995 FIFA Women's World Cup held in Sweden, she scored three times to help the Norwegian team win its first World Cup, including the second goal in Norway's 2-0 win over Germany in the tournament final.

In 1997 when she was 22 she created a record in the Women's Euros when she scored four goals in a single match. The match was against Denmark at Lillestrøm and the final score was 5-0.

Overall, she scored 66 goals in 98 international matches. She retired in 2003, after competing in the 1996 Summer Olympics and winning gold at the 2000 Summer Olympics.

In 2007, she rejoined Asker as the assistant trainer and began playing again, as a reserve striker. On 19 May the same year she took the record as the highest scorer in the elite Norwegian league, the Toppserien, with 147 goals to that date.

== International goals ==
No.	Date	Venue	Opponent	Score	Result	Competition
1.	10 June 1995	Gävle, Sweden	Canada	4–0	7–0	1999 FIFA Women's World Cup
2.	10 June 1995	Gävle, Sweden	Canada	6–0	7–0	1999 FIFA Women's World Cup
3.	18 June 1995	Solna, Sweden	Germany	2–0	2–0	1999 FIFA Women's World Cup
4.	19 September 1995	Ulefoss, Norway	Slovakia	3–0	17–0	UEFA Women's Euro 1997 qualifying
5.	19 September 1995	Ulefoss, Norway	Slovakia	4–0	17–0	UEFA Women's Euro 1997 qualifying
6.	19 September 1995	Ulefoss, Norway	Slovakia	5–0	17–0	UEFA Women's Euro 1997 qualifying
7.	19 September 1995	Ulefoss, Norway	Slovakia	7–0	17–0	UEFA Women's Euro 1997 qualifying
8.	19 September 1995	Ulefoss, Norway	Slovakia	11–0	17–0	UEFA Women's Euro 1997 qualifying
9.	19 September 1995	Ulefoss, Norway	Slovakia	12–0	17–0	UEFA Women's Euro 1997 qualifying
10.	17 March 1996	Quarteira, Portugal	Sweden	2–0	4–0	1996 Algarve Cup
11.	17 March 1996	Quarteira, Portugal	Sweden	3–0	4–0	1996 Algarve Cup
12.	25 May 1996	Espoo, Finland	Finland	2–0	2–0	UEFA Women's Euro 1997 qualifying
13.	6 July 1996	Kolbotn, Norway	Finland	4–0	7–0	UEFA Women's Euro 1997 qualifying
14.	25 July 1996	Washington, D.C., United States	Japan	1–0	4–0	1996 Summer Olympics
15.	25 July 1996	Washington, D.C., United States	Japan	4–0	4–0	1996 Summer Olympics
16.	31 August 1996	Levice, Slovakia	Slovakia	3–0	4–0	UEFA Women's Euro 1997 qualifying
28.	30 June 1997	Lillestrøm, Norway	Denmark	1–0	5–0	UEFA Women's Euro 1997
29.	30 June 1997	Lillestrøm, Norway	Denmark	2–0	5–0	UEFA Women's Euro 1997
30.	30 June 1997	Lillestrøm, Norway	Denmark	3–0	5–0	UEFA Women's Euro 1997
31.	30 June 1997	Lillestrøm, Norway	Denmark	5–0	5–0	UEFA Women's Euro 1997
32.	31 August 1997	Oslo, Norway	Australia	2–0	7–1	Friendly
33.	31 August 1997	Oslo, Norway	Australia	3–0	7–1	Friendly
34.	31 August 1997	Oslo, Norway	Australia	4–0	7–1	Friendly
35.	31 August 1997	Oslo, Norway	Australia	6–1	7–1	Friendly
36.	18 January 1998	Guangzhou, China	China	2–1	2–1	1998 Four Nations Tournament
37.	21 January 1998	Guangzhou, China	Sweden	1–0	2–1	1998 Four Nations Tournament
38.	20 June 1999	Foxborough, United States	Russia	2–0	2–1	1999 FIFA Women's World Cup
39.	23 June 1999	Landover, United States	Canada	6–1	7–1	1999 FIFA Women's World Cup
40.	30 June 1999	San Jose, United States	Sweden	2–0	3–1	1999 FIFA Women's World Cup
41.	7 March 2000	Norwich, England	England	1–0	3–0	UEFA Women's Euro 2001 qualifying
42.	7 May 2000	Moss, Norway	Portugal	3–0	5–0	UEFA Women's Euro 2001 qualifying
43.	7 May 2000	Moss, Norway	Portugal	5–0	5–0	UEFA Women's Euro 2001 qualifying
44.	4 June 2000	Moss, Norway	England	3–0	8–0	UEFA Women's Euro 2001 qualifying
45.	4 June 2000	Moss, Norway	England	7–0	8–0	UEFA Women's Euro 2001 qualifying
46.	4 June 2000	Moss, Norway	England	8–0	8–0	UEFA Women's Euro 2001 qualifying
47.	17 September 2000	Canberra, Australia	Nigeria	3–1	3–1	2000 Summer Olympics
48.	20 September 2000	Canberra, Australia	China	1–0	2–1	2000 Summer Olympics
64.	11 September 2003	Kolbotn, Norway	Denmark	1–0	1–1	UEFA Women's Euro 2005 qualifying
65.	24 September 2003	Washington, D.C., United States	Brazil	1–2	1–4	2003 FIFA Women's World Cup
66.	27 September 2003	Foxborough, United States	South Korea	4–0	7–1	2003 FIFA Women's World Cup

== Fulham ==
Pettersen rejected offers from American clubs to join Fulham Ladies, the only professional women's club in Europe, in January 2001. On her debut she scored a hat-trick in an 8–0 destruction of Manchester City in the fourth round of the FA Women's Cup. Later in 2001, Pettersen was then appointed as the new captain. Pettersen was nominated for FIFA World Player of the Year award.

== Honours ==
Fulham

- FA Women's Premier League National Division: 2002–03
- FA Women's Cup: 2002 2003
- FA Women's Premier League Cup: 2002, 2003

Norway

=== Olympics ===
- Atlanta 1996 – Bronze
- Sydney 2000 – Gold

=== FIFA Women's World Cup ===
- 1995 FIFA World Cup in Sweden – Gold
