= Jessica Gray =

English footballer

Personal information
- Full name: Jessica Sarah Gray
- Date of birth: 25 January 2001 (age 25)
- Place of birth: Cambridge, England
- Height: 1.87 m (6 ft 2 in)
- Position: Goalkeeper

Team information
- Current team: Portsmouth
- Number: 1

Youth career
- Chelsea
- London City Lionesses

Senior career*
Years	Team	Apps	(Gls)
2021–2022	London City Lionesses	0	(0)
2022	Billericay Town	4	(0)
2022–2025	Charlton Athletic	15	(0)
2025–	Portsmouth	0	(0)
- * Club domestic league appearances and goals as of 20 October 2024

Jessica Gray (born 25 January 2001) is an English professional footballer who plays as a goalkeeper, for women’s national league South side Fulham FC.

== Youth career ==
Gray played for the development team for one season before signing her first professional contract with the senior team. She was the first player to sign permanently to the first team from the development squad for London City Lionesses.

== Club career ==
Gray spent the 2022–23 season at Women's Championship club London City Lionesses and made her professional debut with the club.

Gray played for Billericay Town Football Club in the FA Women's National League from August 2022 to November 2022. She made four appearances during this time, earning two Player of the Match awards.

In November 2022 Gray joined Women's Championship club Charlton Athletic before signing a two-year deal in August 2023. She was given the number 1 shirt at the start of the 2023–24 season. On 2 July 2025, it was announced that Gray had departed the club upon the expiration of her contract.
