= Leanne Hall (footballer) =

English footballer and coach

Personal information
- Full name: Leanne Claire Hall
- Date of birth: 19 May 1980 (age 46)
- Place of birth: Rotherham, England
- Position: Goalkeeper

Team information
- Current team: Birmingham City (assistant manager)

Youth career
- Sheffield Wednesday

Senior career*
| Years | Team | Apps | (Gls) |
| 1995–2002 | Doncaster Rovers Belles | | |
| 2000 | FH | 7 | (0) |
| 2002–2004 | Leeds United | | |
| 2004–2006 | Fulham | | |
| 2006–2007 | Doncaster Rovers Belles | | |
| 2007–2008 | Leeds United | | |
| 2008–2011 | Leicester City Women | 49 | (0) |
| 2011 | Birmingham City | 3 | (0) |

International career^{‡}
| 2000–2004 | England | 13 | (0) |
- * Club domestic league appearances and goals ‡ National team caps and goals as of 11:13, 29 July 2011 (UTC)

Leanne Claire Hall (born 19 May 1980) is an English football goalkeeper and coach who played at full international level for England. She has spent much of her career in Yorkshire, starting at Sheffield Wednesday and enjoying two separate spells with both Doncaster Rovers Belles and Leeds United. Hall also played FA Women's Premier League football for Fulham and Leicester City Women, while the 2000 summer season was spent in Iceland with FH. In a career disrupted by serious injury, Hall attended UEFA Women's Euro 2001 and UEFA Women's Euro 2005 as a reserve goalkeeper. She most recently played for Birmingham City in the 2011 FA WSL.

In 2016, Hall was announced as Birmingham City Assistant manager.

Hall holds a double UEFA A licenses in goalkeeping and outfield play. Her skills have most recently been shared with Arsenal WFC. She was a coach at Sheffield FC Ladies and the technical director of Leeds United Ladies' Centre.

== Club career ==
Hall joined Doncaster Belles in 1995 from Sheffield Wednesday, leaving to join Leeds United Ladies in 2002. In the summer of 2000, Hall had played professional football in Iceland, making seven appearances for FH. In February 2003, Hall suffered a broken leg in Leeds' 3–0 FA Women's Cup defeat to Aston Villa. From Leeds, she moved to Fulham Ladies in 2004, with whom she featured in a UEFA Women's Cup quarter final. She rejoined Doncaster Rovers Belles in the 2006 close season. Within a month of joining she was ruled out for a number of months due to requiring surgery for a persistent neck injury.

In July 2007 she rejoined Leeds Carnegie, as player-assistant-manager. She left Leeds to join Leicester City Women in October 2008. During her career to date Hall has been a finalist in three FA Women's Cups and a League Cup.

In summer 2011 Hall was signed by FA WSL leaders Birmingham City. She made an immediate debut in a 3–2 win at Bristol Academy after regular custodian Marie Hourihan suffered a recurrence of a shoulder injury during the pre–match warm up.

== International career ==
Hall represented England, playing 13 times at full international level. She made her senior debut in August 2000, in a 1–0 friendly defeat to France, before 50,000 spectators at Stade Vélodrome. In April 2004, Hall was elevated to first choice for England when Pauline Cope retired from international football and Rachel Brown damaged her anterior cruciate ligament.

She was allotted 133 when the FA announced their legacy numbers scheme to honour the 50th anniversary of England's inaugural international.

== Coaching career ==
In 2004, Hall founded the Leanne Hall Sports & Goalkeeping School.

She landed a job with Sheffield Wednesday's football in the community department in January 2007.

== Personal life ==
Rotherham-born Hall attended Brinsworth Comprehensive School and was a guest of honour at their 40th anniversary celebrations in April 2009.
