= Jody Bowry =

English former football player

Personal information
- Full name: Jody Bowry
- Date of birth: 1980 or 1981 (age 44–45)
- Position: Goalkeeper

Youth career
- 1992–1994: Woking Girls
- 1994–1995: Abbey Rangers

Senior career*
Years	Team	Apps	(Gls)
1995–2000	Chelsea		
2000–2003	Fulham		
- * Club domestic league appearances and goals as of 17:21, 7 September 2020 (UTC) ‡ National team caps and goals as of 17:21, 7 September 2020 (UTC)

Jody Bowry (previously Jody Smith; born 1980/1981) is an English former professional football goalkeeper who played for clubs including Chelsea and Fulham.

== Club career ==
Bowry signed for Chelsea as a 15-year-old and immediately went into the first team. In 2000 "widely admired" Bowry was a "star close-season signing" for Fulham, who had become the first full-time professional women's club in Europe. In December 2001 Fulham signed Astrid Johannessen who competed with Bowry for the goalkeeping position until 2003 when the club lost its professional status.

== Personal life ==
Bowry is from West Byfleet. She was among the first female members of the Professional Footballers Association (PFA) and studied a Sports Science and Coaching degree with their assistance. She later worked as a school teacher.

== Honours ==
Fulham

- FA Women's Premier League National Division: 2002–03
- FA Women's Premier League Southern Division: 2001–02
- South East Combination Women's Football League: 2000–01
- FA Women's Cup: 2001–02, 2002–03
- FA Women's Premier League Cup: 2001–02, 2002–03
