= Ronnie Gibbons =

English footballer (born 1980)

Personal information
- Full name: Ronnie Suzanne Gibbons
- Date of birth: 16 January 1980 (age 46)
- Place of birth: Wandsworth, England
- Position: Defender

Senior career*
| Years | Team | Apps | (Gls) |
| 1994–2003 | Fulham | | |
| 2003–2004 | Charlton Athletic | | |

International career^{‡}
| 2000–2004 | Republic of Ireland | | |
- * Club domestic league appearances and goals ‡ National team caps and goals as of 09:50, 23 May 2010 (UTC)

Ronnie Suzanne Gibbons (born 16 January 1980) is a former professional footballer. She played as a right-back for Fulham Ladies and the Republic of Ireland national team.

== Club career ==
Gibbons joined Fulham as a 13-year-old and became captain at the age of 17. Three years later in 2000, when Fulham became the first full-time professional women's football club in Europe, Gibbons was one of six existing players to be kept on. The more experienced Katrine Pedersen took over the captaincy during the 2000–01 season, as Fulham won the South East Combination but lost the FA Women's Cup final to Arsenal.

Over the next two seasons Gibbons remained with Fulham as they won successive trebles of Southern Premier, League Cup and FA Women's Cup in 2001–02 and National Premier, League Cup and FA Women's Cup in 2002–03. She was named as a substitute in both FA Women's Cup final wins.

Gibbons joined Charlton Athletic shortly after Fulham reverted to semi-pro status in 2003. She made her debut against Tranmere Rovers on 9 November 2003.

On 18 October 2024, in an interview with The Athletic, Gibbons alleged that Fulham's owner, Mohamed Al-Fayed, had sexually assaulted her on multiple occasions in the year 2000, while she played for the club. In the interview, she said she felt she could not leave the club because doing so would cause the collapse of Fulham's women's team. Gibbions' allegations formed one part of a vast array of sexual misconduct allegations against Al-Fayed.

== International career ==
Although born in Wandsworth, Gibbons was eligible for the Republic of Ireland as her grandparents were from Galway and County Mayo. She was invited for a trial in April 1999 while still playing in the Greater London League with Fulham and made her debut in January 2000.
