= Karen Burke =

English footballer (born 1971)

Personal information
- Date of birth: 14 June 1971 (age 55)
- Place of birth: Liverpool, England
- Position: Midfielder

Senior career*
Years	Team	Apps	(Gls)
- St Helens
–1997	Liverpool Ladies		
1997–2000	Everton Ladies		
1998	ÍBV	2	(1)
1999	ÍBV	8	(6)
2000	ÍBV	11	(5)
2000–2002	Doncaster Rovers Belles		
2002–2003	Leeds United Ladies		
2003	ÍBV	11	(5)
2003–2004	Doncaster Rovers Belles		
2004	ÍBV	9	(5)
2004–2007	Leeds United Ladies		
2007–2010	Blackburn Rovers Ladies	43	(6)

International career
1992–2003	England	72	(7)
- * Club domestic league appearances and goals as of 11:58, 12 August 2009 (UTC)

Karen Burke (born 14 July 1971) is an English former footballer. She most recently played for Blackburn Rovers Ladies. Burke was born in Liverpool and represented England at full international level.

== Club career ==
Burke only took up football aged 21, with a spell at St Helens. In 1994 she reached her first FA Women's Cup final with Knowsley United. Burke hit the crossbar in injury time as Knowsley lost 1–0 to Doncaster Belles. In the following year's final, with Knowsley now known as Liverpool Ladies, player-of-the-match Burke twice put them ahead against Arsenal, only for Marieanne Spacey to seal a 3–2 win for The Gunners. In summer 1995 Burke agreed to join Everton Ladies, but changed her mind when Liverpool appointed John Bennison—a professional coach from the Liverpool "Boot Room".

In April 1996 Burke lost her third consecutive FA Women's Cup final to Croydon, on penalties after a 1–1 draw at the New Den. Luckless Burke had given Liverpool the lead and converted her penalty in the shootout. She finally joined Everton Ladies in the 1997 close season and won the Premier League title in 1997–1998. She played in Iceland in summer 1998, 1999 and 2000, with ÍBV.

In 2000 Burke and teammate Becky Easton joined Doncaster Belles. Burke would travel twice weekly to Doncaster from her base in Liverpool, where she worked in a pub. The 2002 FA Women's Cup Final was Burke's fourth unsuccessful appearance, as Doncaster were beaten 2–1 by the full-time professionals of Fulham.

Burke moved to Leeds United Ladies for 2002–2003 before spending the 2003 close season back with Icelandic side ÍBV. She returned to Doncaster Belles for 2003–2004, before joining an exodus of players brought about by a cash crisis and moving back to Leeds, via another stint at ÍBV. Burke then suffered more FA Women's Cup final disappointment with Leeds United Ladies, in their 5–0 defeat against Arsenal in 2006.

Burke left Leeds to join Blackburn Rovers Ladies in the 2007 close season. Although signed as an attacking midfielder, she moved to right-back for the 2009–10 season.

== International career ==
Burke has won over 50 caps for the England senior team.

In November 2022, Burke was recognized by The Football Association as one of the England national team's legacy players, and as the 95th women's player to be capped by England.

=== International goals ===
Scores and results list England's goal tally first.

#	Date	Venue	Opponent	Result	Competition	Scored
1	11 February 1996	Benavente	Portugal	5–0	1997 UEFA Women's Championship Qual.	1
2	15 February 1998	Stade Jacques Fould, Alençon	France	2–3	Friendly	1
3	17 October 1999	Sportanlagen Trinermatten, Zofingen	Switzerland	3–0	2001 UEFA Women's Championship Qual.	1
4	20 February 2000	Estádio do Sport Grupo Sacavenense, Lisbon	Portugal	2–2	2001 UEFA Women's Championship Qual.	1
5	28 September 2000	Brisbane Road, London	Finland	2–1	Friendly	1
6	7 March 2002	Estádio Municipal, Quarteira	Scotland	4–1	Algarve Cup	1
7	23 March 2002	Zuiderpark Stadion, The Hague	Netherlands	4–1	2003 FIFA World Cup qual.	1

== Blackburn statistics ==
To October 2009

Club	Season	League		WFA Cup		Premier League Cup		County Cup		Other		Total	
Club	Season	Apps	Goals	Apps	Goals	Apps	Goals	Apps	Goals	Apps	Goals	Apps	Goals
Blackburn Rovers Ladies	2007–08	22	3	3	1	3	0	3	1	0	0	31	5
Blackburn Rovers Ladies	2008–09	21	3	3	1	2	0	4	3	0	0	30	7
Blackburn Rovers Ladies	2009–10	7	1	0	0	2	0	1	0	0	0	10	1
Blackburn Rovers Ladies	Club Total	50	7	6	2	7	0	8	4	0	0	71	13
