= Hellevad Parish, Aabenraa Municipality =

Parish in Aabenraa Municipality, Denmark

Hellevad Parish Hellevad Sogn
- Parish
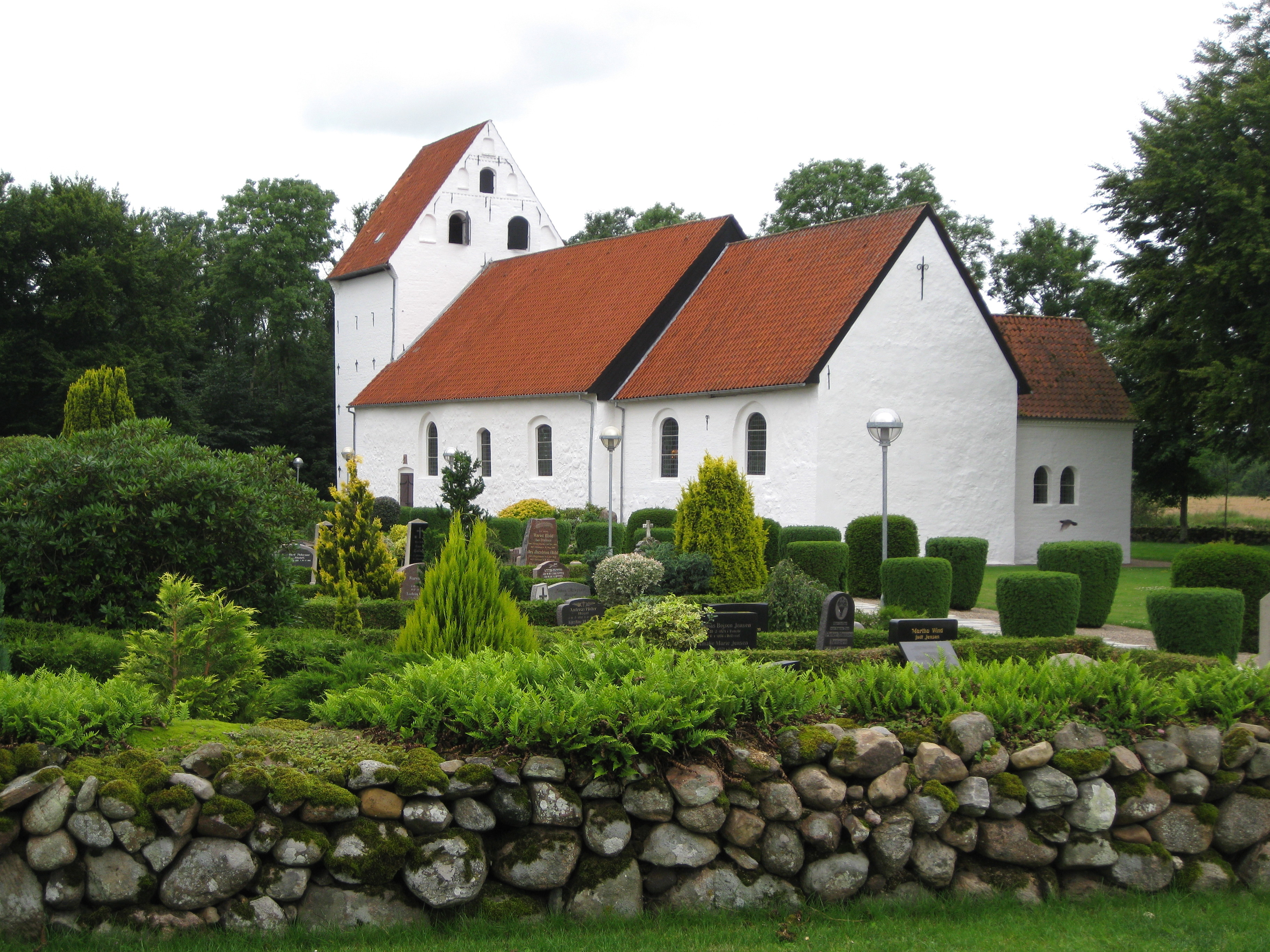
- Hellevad Church

- The parish within Aabenraa Municipality
- Country: Denmark
- Region: Southern Denmark
- Municipality: Aabenraa Municipality
- Diocese: Haderslev

Population (2025)
  - Total: 952
- Parish number: 9017

Hellevad Parish (Danish: Hellevad Sogn) is a parish in the Diocese of Haderslev in Aabenraa Municipality, Denmark.
