= Edward F. Howrey =

Federal Trade Commission chair (1903–1996)

Edward F. "Jack" Howrey (September 6, 1903 – April 10, 1996) was the chair of the Federal Trade Commission from April 1, 1953, to September 12, 1955.

Born in Waterloo, Iowa, Howrey received an A.B. from the University of Iowa in 1925, followed by an LL.B. from the George Washington University Law School in 1927. From 1927 to 1929 he worked for the United States Department of Justice, working with the FBI on an antitrust investigation of the motion-picture industry. He then worked for private firms in Chicago and Washington, D.C., until 1953. In 1951, he argued the largest Indian claim case to come before the United States Supreme Court to that date, on behalf of the Alcea Band of Tillamooks. In 1953, President Dwight D. Eisenhower appointed Howrey to chair the FTC, where he remained until 1955. Howrey then founded the law firm, Howrey LLP, specializing in antitrust litigation, which eventually became "one of the leading and largest firms in Washington, D.C." Howrey retired from practice in the 1980s.

In 1933, Howrey married Jane Pickett Gould. Following her death, he remarried to childhood friend India Picket Lilly in 1989. Howrey died of pneumonia and congestive heart failure at Winchester Hospital in Virginia at the age of 92.

Political offices
Preceded by James M. Mead	Chairmen of the Federal Trade Commission; 1953–1955	Succeeded by John W. Gwynne
