= Howry =

Howry is a surname. Notable people with the surname include:

- Bob Howry (born 1973), American baseball player
- Charles Bowen Howry (1844–1928), American politician, attorney, and judge
- Keenan Howry (born 1981), American football player
- Lyle Howry, American film producer and philanthropist

== See also ==
- Howrey (surname)
