= Howrey =

Defunct global law firm

Howrey LLP
- Headquarters: Washington, D. C.
- No. of offices: 18 (2008)
- No. of attorneys: 700+ (2008)
- Major practice areas: antitrust law intellectual property law global litigation
- Key people: Robert F. Ruyak (Managing Partner & CEO)
- Revenue: ▲US$573 million (2009)
- Date founded: 1956
- Founder: Jack Howrey; Bill Simon; Hal Baker; Dave Murchison
- Company type: Limited liability partnership
- Dissolved: March 2011 (Bankruptcy)
- Website: www.howrey.com

Howrey LLP (aka Howrey Simon Arnold & White) was a global law firm that practiced antitrust, global litigation and intellectual property law. In March 2011, Howrey dissolved and subsequently entered bankruptcy. At its peak Howrey had more than 700 attorneys in 18 locations worldwide.

== History ==
The firm was founded as Howrey, Simon, Baker, & Murchison in July 1956 by four antitrust attorneys: Jack Howrey, a former chairman of the Federal Trade Commission under President Dwight D. Eisenhower; Bill Simon, Hal Baker and Dave Murchison. It was the first national antitrust firm. It hired its first patent lawyer partner in 1972, and by 1985, Howrey numbered 150 attorneys, with a list of clients across the country.

In 2000, Howrey & Simon merged with Arnold, White & Durkee, an intellectual property specialty firm founded in 1956 in Houston, Texas with offices in six cities and 120 attorneys. This combination resulted in the new firm of Howrey, Simon, Arnold & White, with 350 lawyers, one of the largest antitrust and intellectual property practices in the world, and laid the groundwork for the firm’s expansion overseas. Between 2000 and 2008, the firm expanded to more than 700 attorneys and 18 offices in the United States, Europe and Asia.

Howrey provided over 45,000 hours of free legal assistance to more than 250 pro bono clients. The firm was awarded the 2003 Thomas L. Sager Award by the Minority Corporate Counsel Association for its commitment to promoting diversity in the workplace.

== Partner departures and dissolution ==
About 60 attorneys departed from Howrey in the year before January 2011, including co-chairs of the firm's antitrust and litigation practices. Winston & Strawn reportedly considered merger with Howrey in late January, but instead offered to take most of Howrey's partners. The firm continued to lose partners as a group of 11 attorneys from Howrey's Chicago office moved to Morgan, Lewis & Bockius, including the office's managing partner and the class action defense practice leader.

On March 9, 2011, the Executive Committee of Howrey LLP announced that, pursuant to a vote by the firm’s partnership, it would dissolve the existing Howrey partnership, effective March 15, 2011 and commence an orderly wind down of its affairs. On March 31, 2011 Howrey LLP closed its doors laying off all of its employees. In April 2011, Trepel McGrane Greenfield LLP, a law firm headquartered in San Jose, California, representing a group of alleged creditors of Howrey LLP, filed an involuntary Chapter 7 bankruptcy petition against the law firm with the United States Bankruptcy Court for the Northern District of California. That involuntary Chapter 7 case was converted to a Chapter 11 bankruptcy case in June 2011 at the request of the law firm. On July 6, 2011, Howrey filed schedules of assets and liabilities with the bankruptcy court which listed assets of $138.7 million and liabilities of $107 million. On a motion by Howrey the case was converted back to a Chapter 7 case effective December 1, 2015. A motion for the sale of property filed by the trustee was scheduled for hearing on December 29, 2023. Litigation over rights to bankruptcy assets occurred, and the case remained pending in February 2026.

== Former locations ==
- Amsterdam
- Brussels
- Chicago
- Düsseldorf
- East Palo Alto, California
- Houston
- Irvine, California
- London
- Los Angeles
- Madrid
- Munich
- New York City
- Northern Virginia
- Paris
- Salt Lake City
- San Francisco
- Taipei
- Washington, D. C.
