= Mandy Lowe =

English footballer (born 1970)

Personal information
- Date of birth: 1 January 1970 (age 56)
- Position: Defender

Senior career*
Years	Team	Apps	(Gls)
1984–2000	Doncaster Rovers Belles		

International career
1994	England	1	(0)
- * Club domestic league appearances and goals

Mandy Lowe (born 1 January 1970) is a former England women's international footballer. Her greatest achievement was playing in the winning 1994 FA Women's Cup Final with Doncaster Belles.

== International career ==
In November 2022, Lowe was recognized by The Football Association as one of the England national team's legacy players, and as the 100th women's player to be capped by England.

== Honours ==
Doncaster Belles

- FA Women's Cup: 1994
- Runners up 2000

== Bibliography ==
- Davies, Pete (1996). I Lost My Heart To The Belles. Mandarin. ISBN 0-7493-2085-0.
