= Kristy Moore =

Australian footballer (born 1977)

Personal information
- Full name: Kristy Nicole Moore
- Date of birth: 28 January 1977 (age 49)
- Place of birth: Adelaide, Australia
- Height: 1.73 m (5 ft 8 in)
- Positions: Winger; striker

Senior career*
Years	Team	Apps	(Gls)
1991–2000	SASI Pirates		
1998–2001	Barnet		
2001–2003	Fulham		
2004–2008	IF Fløya		
2009–2012	Stabæk	84	(58)
2012–2014	Adelaide United	27	(8)
2013	Los Angeles Strikers	11	(7)
2014	Ottawa Fury		
2016–present	Metro United WFC	11	(7)

International career^{‡}
1997	Australia	7	(1)
2002–2004	England	14	(0)
- * Club domestic league appearances and goals as of 26 February 2014 ‡ National team caps and goals as of 22 May 2010

Kristy Nicole Moore (born 28 January 1977) is an association football winger or striker who has represented both Australia and England at senior international level. She was a full-time professional player with Fulham Ladies before spending nine years in the Norwegian Toppserien with IF Fløya and Stabæk. Moore returned to Australia in December 2012, then signed for Los Angeles Strikers ahead of the 2013 season.

== Club career ==
Born in Adelaide, Moore played for SASI Pirates in the Women's National Soccer League before moving to England and joining Barnet. In season 2000-01, she scored 41 goals in 32 games for Barnet and won the Premier League Southern Division Player of the Year award. She was then signed by the professional club Fulham and won two consecutive FA Women's Cups and the Premier League National Division in 2002–03.

When Fulham reverted to semi-professional status that summer, Moore followed the club's Norwegian contingent to Norway to play in the top women's league, the Toppserien. She played for IF Fløya in Tromsø from 2003 to 2008 and then Stabæk in Bærum, right outside Oslo, from 2009 onwards. Her new club finished second in the league in 2009 and won the league title in 2010 and the Cup competition in 2011 and 2012. Moore has the distinction of having played every one of Stabæk's first 100 matches.

Her career in Norwegian club football was a high-scoring one and in 2004 she was the top scorer in the Toppserien. In a match in that year she scored six goals against the legendary goalkeeper Bente Nordby. Again in 2008, she was the top scorer in the Toppserien. Moore's scoring record in the Toppserien is: 2003 5 goals, 2004 20, 2005 11, 2006 6, 2007 10, 2008 22, 2009 19, 2010 12, for a total of 105 at the start of 2011. On 6 August 2011, she scored twice to bring her total for the season to 12 and her overall total to 117, and with that, she entered the top ten in the all-time top-scorers' list for the Toppserien.

By the end of 2011, she had claimed 20 goals, bringing her total to 125, one goal behind Solveig Gulbrandsen, and her place in the all-time list to 9th. In 2012 Moore scored another seven goals to bring her total in the Toppserien to 132 and she finished the season in sixth place in the all-time list.

In the autumn of 2011, Stabæk played two Champions League matches against FFC Frankfurt, winning the first one 1–0 in Oslo but losing 4–1 in Frankfurt a week later. Moore scored the only away goal of the tie but in spite of having scoring chances, Stabæk lost on aggregate.

In December 2012 Moore decided to return to Australia after 15 years away. She left Norway as fifth on the all-time Toppserien goalscorer list. Joining Adelaide United as a guest player, Moore scored on her W-League debut, a 2–0 home win over Newcastle Jets on 15 December 2012.

At the beginning of 2013, Kristy Moore moved to California to play for LA Strikers in the US Soccer Leagues W-league.

After playing for Adelaide United during the 2014 Australian W-League season, Moore retired in December 2014.

== International career ==
Moore made her debut for Australia as a late substitute against Sweden in Ostend, Belgium in August 1997. In her first start, against Hungary, she scored Australia's second goal in a 4–0 win. All of her seven full international appearances occurred in 1997, six during Australia's tour of Europe.

She was also eligible for England through her English mother. England manager Hope Powell needed another center forward because Kelly Smith was injured and Angela Banks retired from international football due to a fear of flying.

FIFA ultimately granted permission for Moore's change of allegiance as her appearances for Australia were all in friendly matches. Her England debut came in a 1–0 home defeat by Nigeria on 23 July 2002 at Carrow Road. In September 2002 she made her competitive debut for England as a half-time substitute in a 1–0 home win over Iceland.

Moore then featured in both legs of England's 2003 World Cup qualifying play-off defeat by France. Although England's leading striker Karen Walker retired in the aftermath of that loss, Moore continued to play most of her football for England on the wing, often as a substitute. She played the first half of a 1–0 friendly win over the country of her birth at Turf Moor, Burnley in September 2003.

In November 2003 she came close to scoring her first goal for England, in a 5–0 friendly win over Scotland at Deepdale. After replacing Jody Handley her 87th-minute corner kick was diverted in by Scotland goalkeeper Claire Johnstone for an own goal. Moore had hoped to be selected for UEFA Women's Euro 2005, but did not make the final 20-player squad. Club teammates Margunn Haugenes and Katrine Pedersen suggested that playing club football in Norway had harmed Moore's England career.

She was allotted 143 when the FA announced their legacy numbers scheme to honour the 50th anniversary of England’s inaugural international.

== Personal life ==
Moore wanted to play Australian rules football as a child but was not allowed to because she was female.
