= Sanchia Duncan =

English footballer

Personal information
- Position: Midfielder

Senior career*
Years	Team	Apps	(Gls)
- Fulham L.F.C.
- * Club domestic league appearances and goals

Sanchia Duncan is an English former footballer who played for Fulham L.F.C. Duncan's greatest achievement was winning the 2003 FA Women's Cup Final.

== Honours ==
- FA Women's Cup: 2003
- FA Women's Premier League Cup: 2003
