= Astrid Johannessen =

Norwegian footballer (born 1978)

Personal information
- Full name: Astrid Hitland Johannessen
- Date of birth: 10 January 1978 (age 48)
- Place of birth: Norway
- Height: 1.78 m (5 ft 10 in)
- Position: Goalkeeper

Youth career
- Bergen Nord

Senior career*
Years	Team	Apps	(Gls)
- Sandviken
1997–1999	Asker		
2000	Arna-Bjørnar		
2001	Asker		
2001–2003	Fulham		
2003–2004	Asker		
2005	Fløya		
2010	Amazon Grimstad		

International career^{‡}
1997–2003	Norway	19	(0)
- * Club domestic league appearances and goals as of 12:00, 17 September 2011 (UTC) ‡ National team caps and goals as of 12:00, 23 September 2011 (UTC)

Astrid Hitland Johannessen (born 10 January 1978) is a Norwegian former footballer who played as a goalkeeper for the Norway women's national football team.

She was understudy to Bente Nordby on the Norwegian team that hosted UEFA Women's Euro 1997 and then finished fourth at the 1999 FIFA Women's World Cup in the United States.

Johannessen won the Toppserien league with her club Asker in 1998 and 1999. She signed for professional English club Fulham in August 2001, agreeing to join in an initial loan deal after the 2001 Norwegian season. Fulham won the treble in season 2002–03, but Johannessen and several other players then left when the women's team lost its professional status.

In August 2010 Johannessen kept goal for Amazon Grimstad in their 4–1 Cup quarter-final defeat by Røa IL.
