= Dick Knight (businessman) =

English businessman

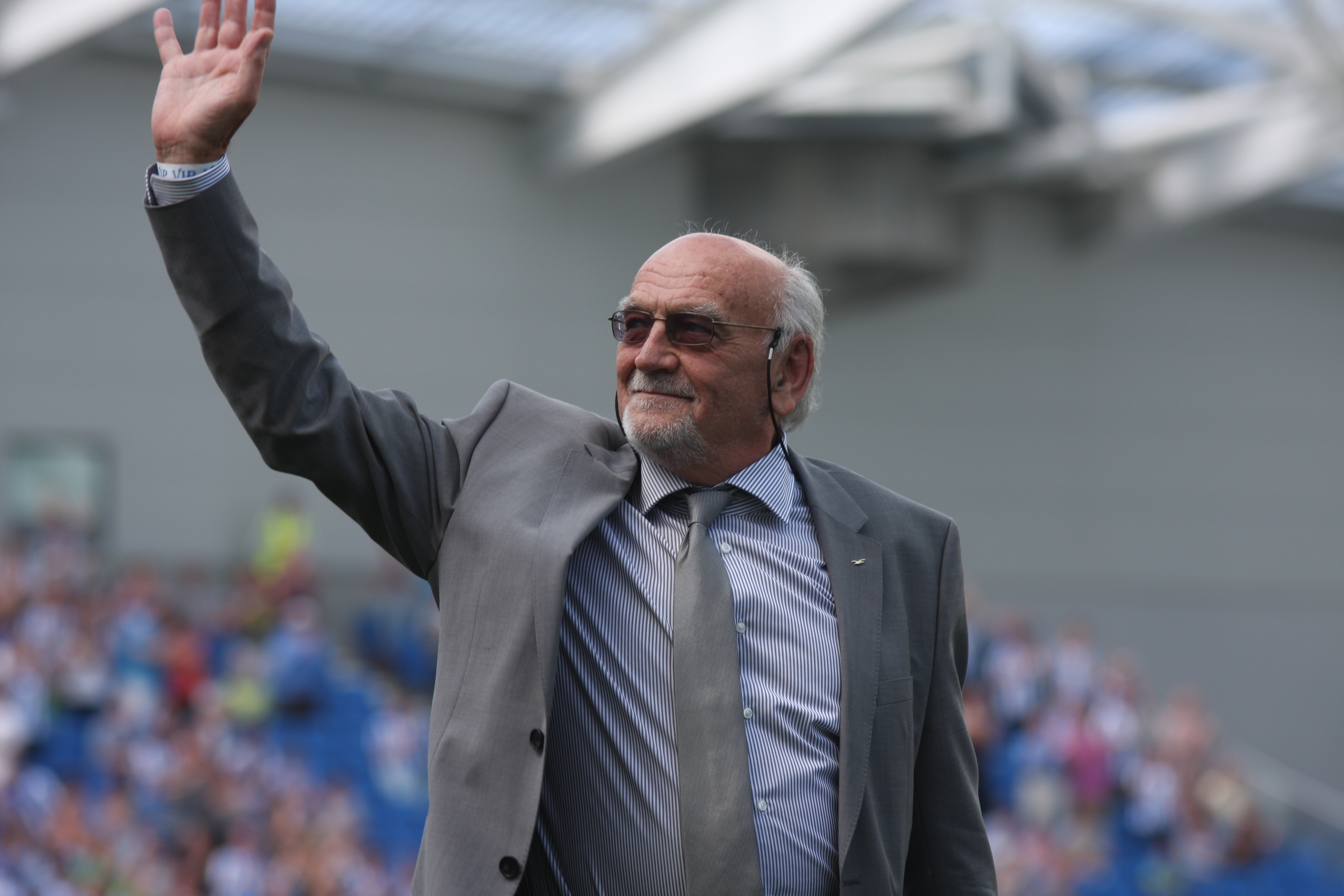
Dick Knight at the opening of the Falmer Stadium

Harry Richard Knight is an English businessman and former chairman of Brighton & Hove Albion F.C., a post he held from 1997 to 2009.

A lifelong fan of Brighton & Hove Albion, he took control in 1997 having led the fan pressure to oust the previous board following their sale of the club's Goldstone Ground to property developers.

In 2005, he owned 375,000 shares in the club's holding company, making him the largest shareholder at 29.61%.

On 18 May 2009 Knight was replaced as chairman at Brighton by Tony Bloom, who had successfully secured £93 million funding for the new Falmer Stadium and secured 75% shareholding at the club. Knight remains life president of Brighton & Hove Albion and chairman of the club's charitable wing Albion In The Community. "Dick's Bar" a pub inside the new stadium is named after Dick Knight.

Knight had a successful career in the advertising industry.
