= Una Nwajei =

English footballer (born 1977)

Personal information
- Full name: Una Obiose Kriston Nwajei
- Date of birth: 7 March 1977 (age 49)
- Place of birth: Nigeria
- Position: Forward

Senior career*
Years	Team	Apps	(Gls)
–1999	Truro City Ladies		
1999–2002	Southampton Saints		
2002–2003	Fulham Ladies		
2004–2008	Amazon Grimstad		
2009	Team Strømmen	22	(14)
2010–2011	Amazon Grimstad	27	(7)

International career^{‡}
2002	England	3	(0)
- * Club domestic league appearances and goals as of 23:12, 14 December 2022 (UTC) ‡ National team caps and goals as of 23:12, 14 December 2022 (UTC)

Una Obiose Kriston Nwajei (born 7 March 1977) is a former footballer. She played as a striker for Amazon Grimstad. Born in Nigeria, she represented England at international level.

== Club career ==
Nwajei began playing for Southampton Saints in the FA Women's Premier League National Division while attending Southampton Institute. Her form won her an international call-up and a professional contract with Fulham early in the 2002–03 season. When Fulham won the treble that season then reverted to semi-pro status, Nwajei followed teammate Margunn Haugenes to Norwegian club Amazon Grimstad.

She remained at Amazon Grimstad thereafter, except for a season at Team Strømmen (now called LSK Kvinner) in 2009. She was Strømmen's top goalscorer with 13 goals.

== International career ==
Nwajei was called up by England in January 2002. She made her debut on 1 March 2002 in a 3–1 Algarve Cup defeat by Norway.

She has England legacy number 142. The FA announced their legacy numbers scheme to honour the 50th anniversary of England’s inaugural international.

== Personal life ==
Nwajei learnt to play football during her childhood in Nigeria. She graduated with a 2:1 in Business and IT from Southampton Institute in 2002.
