= Jody Handley =

English footballer (born 1979)

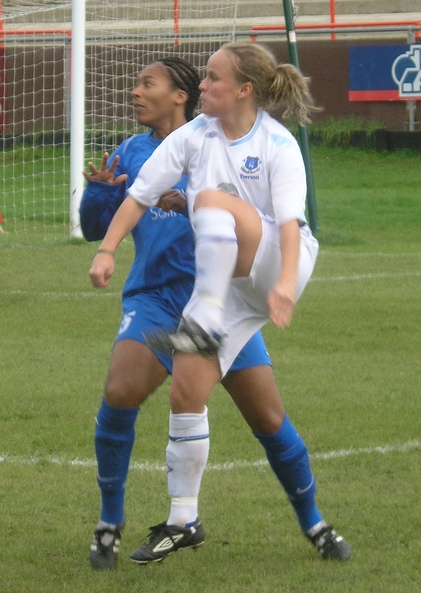
- Handley (right) playing for Everton in November 2006

Personal information
- Date of birth: 12 March 1979 (age 47)
- Place of birth: Stafford, England
- Height: 5 ft 4 in (1.63 m)
- Positions: Winger; forward

College career
Years	Team	Apps	(Gls)
1997	Detroit Mercy Titans		

Senior career*
Years	Team	Apps	(Gls)
- Shrewsbury Ladies
1993–1995	Wolverhampton Wanderers		
1995–1996	Liverpool		
1998–2000	Liverpool		
2000–2001	Everton		
2001–2004	Doncaster Rovers Belles		
2004–2014	Everton		
2015	Doncaster Rovers Belles	0	(0)

International career^{‡}
2002–2010	England	38	(6)
- * Club domestic league appearances and goals ‡ National team caps and goals as of 22:18, 2 October 2010 (UTC)

Jody Handley (born 12 March 1979) is an English former footballer from Stafford, who most recently played for FA WSL 2 club Doncaster Rovers Belles. A pacy and intelligent attacking player, she featured as both a wide midfielder and striker for England as well as clubs including Wolves Women, Liverpool Ladies and Everton Ladies. She has featured in four FA Women's Cup finals with three clubs, losing the first three but captaining Everton Ladies to their win in 2010.

On the international stage Handley won 38 England caps and scored six goals following her debut in July 2002. She took part in the 2007 FIFA Women's World Cup, and was a non-playing squad member at the 2005 and 2009 editions of the UEFA Women's Championship.

== Club career ==
=== Early career ===
Handley began her career at Shrewsbury Ladies before moving on to Wolves Women in the middle of season 1993–94. Making nine appearances, she scored five goals to help Wolves take the Northern Premier title. In her first season in the National Premier Division she made 16 appearances and scored two goals including the opener in Wolves' first National Division win against Millwall Lionesses. The rest of Wolves' campaign did not go so well and they were eventually relegated after a further season.

=== Merseyside and Detroit ===
Handley remained in the top–flight, having signed for Liverpool Ladies in December 1995. She also made an appearance in the FA Women's Cup final in April 1996, which Liverpool lost on penalties to Croydon.

In 1997 Handley played varsity soccer for the University of Detroit Mercy. She registered ten assists and was named league Newcomer of the Year.

After her scholarship in the US, Handley returned to Liverpool in March 1998. However, the Reds were kicked out of the 1997–98 FA Women's Cup when Handley played in a win over Millwall without international clearance. In 2000, she left Liverpool for local rivals Everton and was successfully converted from a midfielder to a striker.

=== Doncaster Belles ===
She moved to Doncaster Belles for season 2001–02 and scored twice on her debut. She went on to play in her second FA Women's Cup final, this time against Fulham. Despite getting on the score sheet Handley had to make do with another runners–up medal; as professional outfit Fulham secured a 2–1 win.

=== Everton ===
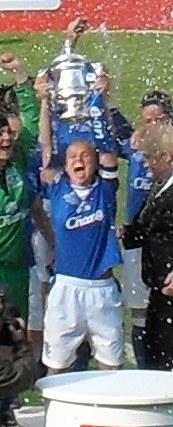
Handley with the 2010 FA Women's Cup

Handley returned to Everton Ladies in the 2004–05 season and went on to score in the FA Cup semi-final win against Arsenal, however she was to be disappointed once again after a 1–0 loss to Charlton Athletic in the 2005 final. In the 2007–08 season Handley was named Everton captain through the absence of Leanne Duffy. Handley then led Everton to their first silverware in over a decade with a 1–0 win against Arsenal in the Premier League Cup final, where she was named Player of the Match.

Season 2008–09 seemed to be full of promise for Handley, but it got off to a bad start when she suffered a broken ankle during the Umbro pre-season tournament. She recovered ahead of schedule and came on as a substitute in the 4–0 FA Cup win against Manchester City before travelling to Cyprus with England for a squad get together. Everton finished second in the league and qualified for the UEFA Women's Champions League.

In 2009–10 Handley captained Everton to their FA Women's Cup final win over Arsenal, setting up Natasha Dowie for the opening goal.

The 2014 season saw Everton defeat local rivals Liverpool en route to the FA Women's Cup final, but Handley did not play as Arsenal won the final 2–0 at Stadium mk. Worse was to follow in September 2014 as Everton were relegated out of the top division for the first time in 21 years.

=== Back to the Belles ===
On 28 January 2015, Handley announced that she had transferred from Everton back to Doncaster Belles. Unable to shake off injuries picked up in pre-season, Handley retired from playing in May 2015: "I felt it was my body's way of telling me enough was enough". She was studying physiotherapy through the Professional Footballers' Association (PFA) and hoped to stay in football in that capacity.

== International career ==
Handley first represented England as a 16-year-old and played in the U-18 national team. She also represented English Universities while a student.

Good performances at club level led to further international recognition for Handley. She made her full debut against Nigeria in July 2002 and was named Player of the Match by Sky Sports. In October 2003 she got her first goal for the senior England team in a 2–2 draw against Russia in Moscow. She was on the score sheet in a 5–0 whitewash of Mexico in the 2005 Algarve Cup and was also involved in the World Cup qualifying campaign, scoring a goal in the record 13–0 win against Hungary en route to China 2007. She played in the finals, coming on for the last ten minutes of England's third game against Argentina, a 6–1 win which guaranteed a place in the quarter-finals.

In May 2009, Handley was one of the first 17 female players to be given central contracts by The Football Association.

She was allotted 144 when the FA announced their legacy numbers scheme to honour the 50th anniversary of England's inaugural international.

=== International goals ===
Scores and results list England's goal tally first.

#	Date	Venue	Opponent	Result	Competition	Scored
1	21 October 2003	Kryoia Soveto, Moscow	Russia	2–2	Friendly	1
2	17 February 2005	National Hockey Stadium, Milton Keynes	Italy	4–1	Friendly	1
3	13 March 2005	Estádio Fernando Cabrita, Lagos	Mexico	5–0	Algarve Cup	1
4	27 October 2005	Tapolca	Hungary	13–0	2007 FIFA World Cup Qual.	1
5	20 April 2006	Priestfield Stadium, Gillingham	Austria	4–0	2007 FIFA World Cup Qual.	1
6	22 July 2009	County Ground, Swindon	Denmark	1–0	Friendly	1

== Personal life ==
Handley attended Sir Graham Balfour School then studied health, diet and fitness at Liverpool University. She was later employed as a health development worker in Knowsley.

In 2018 she graduated from the University of Salford with a degree in Physiotherapy, the first female Professional Footballers Association member to graduate through the programme linked between the university and the PFA.

== Honours ==
=== Club ===
==== Everton ====
- FA Women's Cup (1): 2009–10
- FA Women's Premier League Cup (1): 2007–08

==== Wolves ====
- FA Women's Premier League Northern Division (1): 1993–94
