= Margunn Haugenes =

Norwegian footballer (born 1970)

Personal information
- Full name: Margunn Humlestøl Haugenes
- Date of birth: 25 January 1970 (age 56)
- Place of birth: Florø, Norway
- Height: 1.71 m (5 ft 7 in)
- Position: Midfielder

Youth career
- Kaupanger IL

Senior career*
Years	Team	Apps	(Gls)
1989–1994	Asker		
1994–1995	Sandviken		
1996–2000	Arna-Bjørnar	55	(22)
2000–2003	Fulham Ladies		
2004–2007	Amazon Grimstad	38	(9)
2010–2011	Amazon Grimstad	28	(0)
2016	Amazon Grimstad	6	(0)
2017	Medkila	1	(0)

International career^{‡}
1990–2001	Norway	79	(13)

Managerial career
- 2017–: Medkila
Medal record
Women's football
Representing Norway
Olympic Games
Gold medal – first place	2000 Sydney	Team
World Cup
Silver medal – second place	1991 China	Team
European Championship
Silver medal – second place	1991 Denmark	Team
- * Club domestic league appearances and goals as of 22:57, 5 June 2017 (UTC) ‡ National team caps and goals as of 14:16, 24 September 2014 (UTC)

Margunn Haugenes (née Humlestøl; born 25 January 1970) is a Norwegian footballer. She became Olympic champion in 2000. She has won silver medals with the Norway national team, in the World Cup and in the European Championships.

== Career ==
Haugenes debuted for the Norway women's national football team in 1990 at the age of 20, also moving from her lower-division club Kaupanger IL to the Toppserien club Asker SK. In 1994 she moved to Bergen to play for IL Sandviken, winning the Norwegian Cup competition in 1995. In 1996 she moved to Bjørnar, now Arna-Bjørnar, in the same city, contributing to the team's promotion to the Toppserien and ensuring that it became established at the top level.

Haugenes played 79 matches for the national team, gaining the runner-up place in both the World Cup and the European Cup in 1991. She missed the 1999 season due to pregnancy, but she and the team then won Gold at the 2000 Summer Olympics in Sydney.

Following the Sydney Olympics Haugenes had two seasons at the English club Fulham, and on 6 May 2002 she was in the team that beat Doncaster Belles to win the FA Women's Cup. In 2003, she returned to Norway to play for Amazon Grimstad and eventually retired from football at the end of 2007 after 18 months as player/trainer for the same club.

But Haugenes then started playing again for Amazon Grimstad in 2010 when her husband Gaute Haugenes, former trainer at Fulham, took over as the club's chief trainer. In September 2011 she was still playing as a midfielder in the Toppserien at the age of 41.

Haugenes works as a teacher and as a TV commentator, and is the assistant trainer of Norway's Under-19 girls' team. She has two children. In 2014, she made another playing comeback with a lower division men's team IL Sørfjell. In 2017 Haugenes was forced to make comeback again because the team that she is coach did not have enough players in the game against Vålerenga.

== International goals ==
No.	Date	Venue	Opponent	Score	Result	Competition
1.	31 August 1997	Oslo, Norway	Australia	5–0	7–1	Friendly
2.	31 August 1997	Oslo, Norway	Australia	7–1	7–1	Friendly
3.	18 January 1998	Guangzhou, China	China	1–1	2–1	1998 Four Nations Tournament
4.	21 March 1998	Loulé, Portugal	Denmark	1–0	4–1	1998 Algarve Cup
5.	20 September 2000	Canberra, Australia	China	2–1	2–1	2000 Summer Olympics
6.	11 March 2001	Albufeira, Portugal	Finland	3–0	5–1	2001 Algarve Cup

== Honours ==
Fulham

- FA Women's Premier League National Division: 2002–03
- FA Women's Cup: 2002, 2003
- FA Women's Premier League Cup: 2001–02
