= Justine Lorton =

English footballer

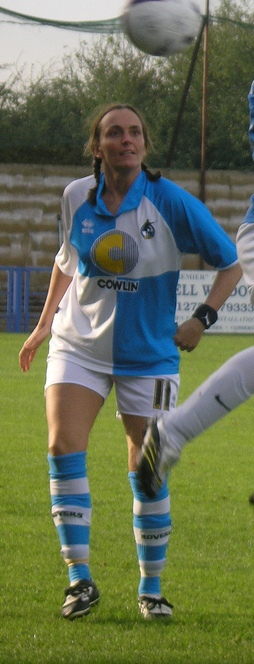

Personal information
- Full name: Justine Joanna Lorton
- Date of birth: 11 March 1974 (age 52)
- Place of birth: Paddington, England
- Position: Forward

Team information
- Current team: Keynsham Town

Senior career*
Years	Team	Apps	(Gls)
1995–1996	Wembley		
1996–1998	Millwall Lionesses		
1998–1999	Arsenal		
1999–2001	Stjarnan		
2001–2003	Charlton Athletic		
2003–2005	Arsenal		
2005–2006	Fulham		
2006–2009	Bristol Academy		
2009–2011	Portsmouth		
2011–2014	Yeovil Town		
2014–	Keynsham Town		

International career
1997–1999	England	7	(0)
- * Club domestic league appearances and goals

Justine Joanna Lorton (born 11 March 1974) is an English footballer, and former England international player. A deep–lying forward player, Lorton enjoyed two spells at Arsenal Ladies as well as playing in Iceland and Sweden.

== Club career ==
Lorton emerged from the Wembley Ladies team managed by John Jones, at the same time as Kelly Smith. Alongside several other promising youngsters, Lorton and Smith won the FA Women's Premier League Cup with Wembley in 1995–96.

The following season, Lorton moved to Millwall Lionesses and won both the 1996–97 Premier League Cup and FA Women's Cup, beating old team Wembley in the final of the latter competition. Louise Waller headed the winning goal from Lorton's corner, in front of 3,015 supporters at Upton Park.

Lorton moved to Arsenal in 1998. In the 1999 FA Women's Cup final against Southampton Saints, Lorton created both goals in Arsenal's 2–0 win. From 1999 until 2001 Lorton enjoyed three short but productive spells in Icelandic football with Stjarnan, scoring eight goals in a total of 24 appearances. She also played for a Swedish club before returning to England. After joining Charlton Athletic, in March 2003 Lorton hit a late winner from the penalty spot to defeat Arsenal in the FA Women's Cup semi–final and take Charlton into their first final. This was despite "shaking like a leaf" due to nerves. However, Lorton was then on the losing side as The Addicks were soundly beaten by professional Fulham in the final. She finished as Charlton's top goalscorer in the competition with four goals.

In 2003–04 Lorton was back with Arsenal and was a 90th-minute substitute as The Gunners recaptured the FA Women's Cup, beating Charlton 3–0 in the final at Loftus Road. On her second debut for Arsenal Lorton scored in a 9–2 win over Tranmere Rovers. Lorton also featured from the bench during Arsenal's run to the 2004–05 UEFA Women's Cup semi–final.

After a season with Fulham in 2005–06, Lorton signed for Bristol Academy in summer 2006. In November 2006 she scored in a 5–1 win over Fulham which took Bristol Academy to the top of the FA Women's Premier League table for the first time in the club's history. She signed for Portsmouth in 2009 and scored in Pompey's shock Premier League Cup win over Sunderland in January 2011.

She has played at Yeovil Town and now dons the green and white colours of Keynsham Town.

== International career ==
As a Millwall Lionesses player, Lorton made her senior England debut as substitute for Sue Smith in a 4–0 friendly win over Scotland at Almondvale Stadium on 23 August 1997. She then replaced Gillian Coultard during a February 1998 3–2 friendly defeat in France and made a third appearance in Hope Powell's first match in charge, a 1–0 home friendly defeat to Sweden in July 1998.

Lorton made one competitive appearance during England's unsuccessful Women's World Cup 1999 qualifying attempt, against Romania. In 1999 she featured against Italy in a 4–1 friendly defeat and won a sixth cap as a 53rd-minute substitute for Angela Banks in a 1–0 victory over Denmark.

Lorton continued to be selected in the National squad ahead of UEFA Women's Euro 2001, but was not included in the final squad.

Lorton has England legacy number 128. The FA announced their legacy numbers scheme to honour the 50th anniversary of England’s inaugural international.

== Personal life ==
In July 2013 Lorton married Yeovil teammate Jade Radburn. In late 2016 Lorton filed for divorce.
