= Katrine Pedersen =

Danish footballer (born 1977)

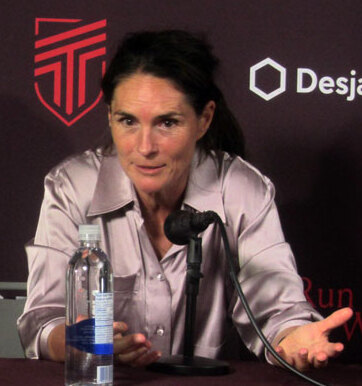
- Pedersen in 2025

Personal information
- Full name: Katrine Søndergaard Pedersen
- Date of birth: 13 April 1977 (age 49)
- Place of birth: Horsens, Denmark
- Height: 1.75 m (5 ft 9 in)
- Positions: Centre back; defensive midfielder

Team information
- Current team: Ottawa Rapid FC (head coach)

Youth career
- –1993: Stensballe IK

Senior career*
Years	Team	Apps	(Gls)
1994–2001	HEI		
2002	Skovbakken		
2002–2003	Fulham		
2003–2005	Fløya		
2006	Djurgården/Älvsjö		
2007–2008	Asker		
2009–2013	Stabæk	99	(18)
2014–2015	Adelaide United	12	(0)
2015	Stabæk	4	(0)

International career
1992–1993	Denmark U17	12	(3)
1994	Denmark U17	7	(1)
1994–2013	Denmark	210	(9)

Managerial career
- 2015–2021: Denmark (assistant)
- 2021–2022: AGF
- 2024–: Ottawa Rapid FC
- * Club domestic league appearances and goals

Katrine Søndergaard Pedersen (born 13 April 1977) is a Danish football coach and former player who serves as the head coach of Canadian Northern Super League club Ottawa Rapid FC. She earned 210 caps, the Danish football record, and scored 9 goals for Denmark, for which she also served as captain for a decade from 2003–2013 for 124 matches. Pedersen was inducted into the Danish Football Hall of Fame in 2022 and as of 2023 sits on the jury committee.

== Club career ==
Pedersen started playing football with local Horsens outfit Stensballe, before starting her senior career at 17 with A-Liga club HEI, which she represented for 8 years until 2002. She played abroad for the remainder of her playing career, representing clubs in the English WFA National League Premier Division, the Swedish Damallsvenskan, the Norwegian Toppserien, and the Australian A-League. Pedersen joined English professional club Fulham FC for the 2002–03 season, where she won the domestic treble. When Fulham reverted to semi-professional status several players left and Pedersen moved to Norway to join the Toppserien club IF Fløya based in Tromsø. After two seasons there she moved to spend the 2006 season playing in Stockholm, Sweden for the Damallsvenskan club Djurgården/Älvsjö. For the 2007 season, she moved back to Norway to play for Asker SK in Oslo, and stayed there during 2008 and stayed as it transferred to Stabæk, as a result of Asker FK's bankruptcy at the end of 2008.

Pedersen joined Australian W-League club Adelaide United for the 2014–15 season.

== International career ==
Pedersen made her senior international debut in September 1994; a 1–0 win over the Netherlands in Hoogezand. She was in her national team in the 2005 UEFA Women's Championship in North West England, and was captain at the FIFA Women's World Cup 2007 in China. She also played in earlier World Cup competitions in 1995 (as an 18-year-old) and 1999, as well as UEFA Women's Championships in 1997, 2001 and 2009.

When Pedersen was named in national coach Kenneth Heiner-Møller's squad for UEFA Women's Euro 2013 she was the most experienced active player in Europe, with 203 caps. Pedersen was named Danish women's player of the year in 2007, 2011, and 2013. In November 2013, she announced her pregnancy and retirement while accepting the Danish Player of the Year award. Her total of 210 international appearances is 81 more than her countryman, Peter Schmeichel. She was four games short of Birgit Prinz's record for European players.

== Coaching career ==
In August 2015, Pedersen was named an assistant coach with the Denmark women's national team.

In December 2020, it was announced that she would become the head coach of AGF Fodbold in the Danish Women's League beginning in the summer of 2021.

In October 2024, she was announced as the first head coach of Ottawa Rapid FC in the Canadian Northern Super League, ahead of the inaugural season in 2025. She coached the team to finish second in the 2025 regular season, qualifying for the NSL playoffs. On 17 July 2026, it was announced that Pedersen would depart the Rapid after the conclusion of the 2026 season.

As of 10 October 2024, Pedersen was among four Danish women to have a UEFA Pro Coaching Licence.

It was announced in October 2026 that Pedersen would return to Danish football managing the Denmark U19 squad from 2027–28 while head coach, Kristine Pedersen, is on maternity leave.

== Personal life ==
Pedersen works as a teacher and football trainer at a high school in Oslo, Norway. In May 2011, her autobiography "Katrine" was published in Denmark. Pedersen is in a relationship with fellow former football player, Maiken Pape.

== See also ==
- List of women's footballers with 100 or more international caps
