= Amanda Barr =

English footballer (born 1982)

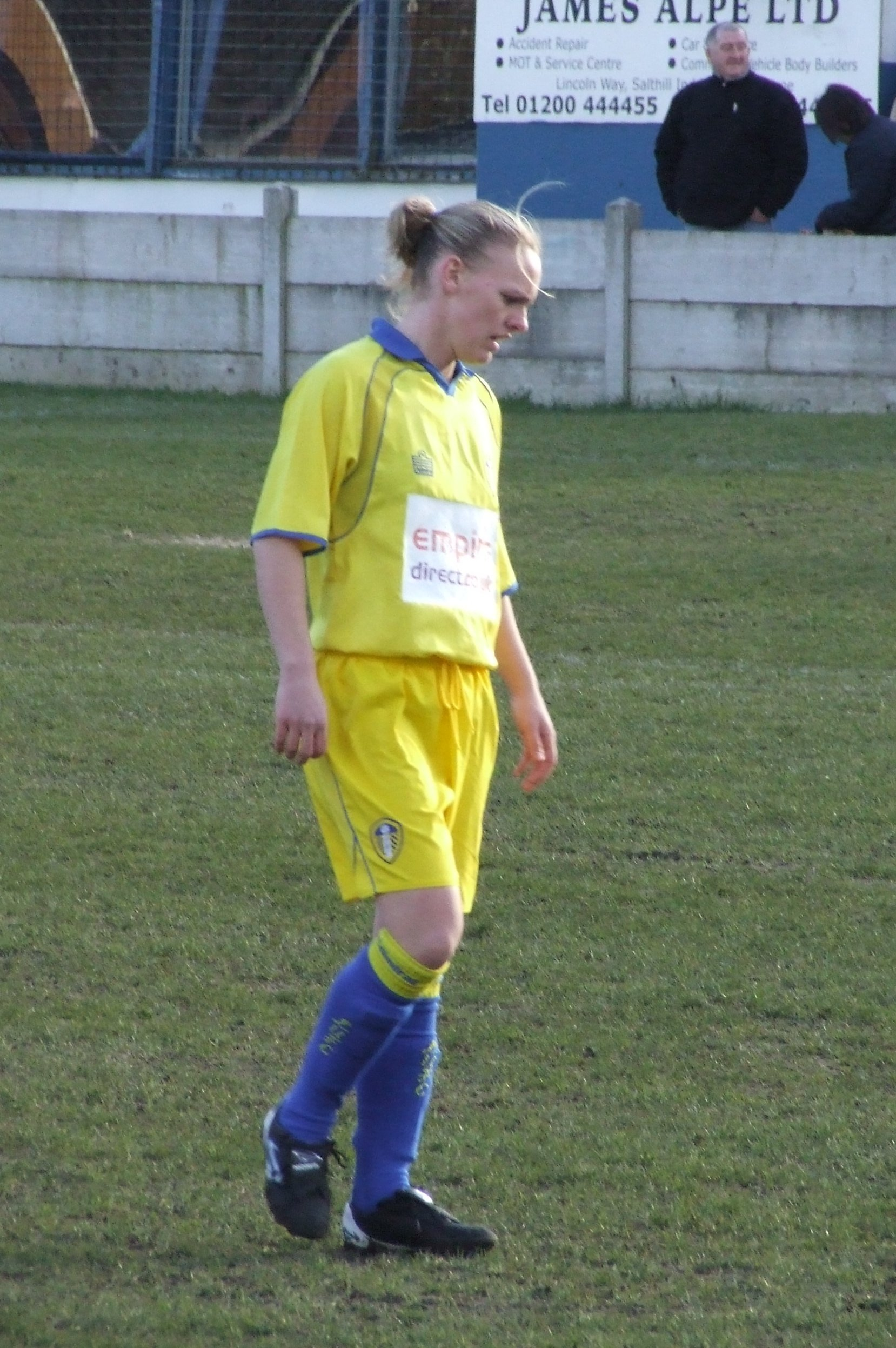

Personal information
- Full name: Amanda Jayne Maslin-Barr
- Date of birth: 2 May 1982 (age 44)
- Place of birth: Stockport, Greater Manchester
- Position: Striker

Youth career
- 1993–1999: Stockport County L.F.C.

Senior career*
Years	Team	Apps	(Gls)
1999	Stockport County L.F.C.		
1999–2000	Everton Ladies		
2000–2001	Doncaster Rovers Belles		
2001–2002	Everton Ladies		(6)
2002–2004	Charlton Athletic		(33)
2004–2005	Birmingham City		(8)
2005–2006	Charlton Athletic		
2006–2007	Blackburn Rovers Ladies		
2007–2008	Leeds Carnegie Ladies		
2008–2010	OOH Lincoln Ladies		
2010–2011	Preston North End Women		
2011	Sheffield Wednesday Women		
2012	Nottingham Forest Ladies		

International career^{‡}
2001–2007	England	39	(10)
- * Club domestic league appearances and goals as of 14:08, 17 May 2007 (UTC) ‡ National team caps and goals as of 06:08, 20 January 2025 (UTC)

Amanda Jayne Maslin-Barr (née Barr; born 2 May 1982) is an English women's football striker. She scored ten goals in 39 appearances for England after making her international debut in 2001. Barr spearheaded the England attack at the 2005 UEFA Women's Championship, hosted in her native North West. In domestic football, she played for several different clubs at senior level from 1999 to 2012.

== Club career ==
Barr attended Avondale High School and began her career at her local team Stockport County L.F.C., staying for six years. Following spells with Everton Ladies and Doncaster Belles, she was awarded the National Division Golden Boot in 2003, after scoring 17 goals in 17 league games for Charlton Athletic. She also scored three goals in helping the team advance to the FA Cup final that season. She scored another 18 goals the following season (2003–04), when Charlton finished runners up in the league to Arsenal.

Barr then signed for Birmingham City alongside England teammates Jo Fletcher, Alex Scott and Rachel Yankey. But after one season Birmingham experienced a funding crisis and Barr returned to Charlton.

In the summer of 2006, Barr joined newly promoted Blackburn Rovers and was made captain in September. She signed for Leeds United in January 2007.

In July 2008, Barr signed with the OOH Lincoln Ladies. She scored 16 goals in her first season, but left when the club failed to win promotion from the Northern Division. After a spell training with Leeds Carnegie she returned to OOH Lincoln a few weeks later, but missed most of 2009–10 with a back injury.

At the start of the 2010–11 season, new Preston North End Women manager Andy Burgess signed Barr for The Lilywhites, as he sought to build a squad capable of winning promotion to the National Premier Division. Barr switched to Northern Combination outfit Sheffield Wednesday Women in February 2011.

== International career ==
After scoring 11 goals in 18 appearances at U-18 level, Barr made her first England start on 1 March 2002 in a 3-1 Algarve Cup defeat to Norway. She scored her first goal four days later in a 6–3 loss to Sweden. Barr had won her first senior cap as a late substitute in a 1–0 win over Scotland at Reebok Stadium in May 2001.

Barr played at Euro 2005, scoring England's second goal in their opening 3-2 group stage win over Finland.

She was given number 138 when the FA announced their legacy numbers scheme to honour the 50th anniversary of England’s inaugural international.

=== International goals ===
Scores and results list England's goal tally first.

#	Date	Venue	Opponent	Result	Competition	Scored
1	5 March 2002	Lagos	Sweden	3–6	Algarve Cup	1
2	22 September 2002	St Andrew's, Birmingham	Iceland	1–0	2003 FIFA World Cup Qual.	1
3	21 October 2003	Kryoia Soveto, Moscow	Russia	2–2	Friendly	1
4	14 November 2003	Deepdale, Preston	Scotland	5–0	Friendly	1
5	16 September 2004	Sportpark De Wending, Heerhugowaard	Netherlands	2–1	Friendly	1
6	17 February 2005	National Hockey Stadium, Milton Keynes	Italy	4–1	Friendly	1
7	9 March 2005	Faro	Portugal	4–0	Algarve Cup	1
8	21 April 2005	Prenton Park, Tranmere	Scotland	2–1	Friendly	1
9	5 June 2005	City of Manchester Stadium, Manchester	Finland	3–2	2005 UEFA Championship	1
10	1 September 2005	Ertl-Glas-Stadion, Amstetten	Austria	4–1	2007 FIFA World Cup Qual.	1

== Personal life ==
Barr took a football scholarship in the national player development centre at Loughborough University. Her nickname is "Munch". She married former Lincoln City, Nottingham Forest and Sheffield Wednesday goalkeeper Daniella (Danni) Maslin in December 2014 and changed her name to Maslin-Barr. She retired from playing in 2012 and founded RTB Development, of which Maslin and herself are directors.
