= Fulham F.C. Women =

- Full name: Fulham Football Club Women
- Nicknames: The Cottagers, The Whites, The Friends
- Founded: 1993 (dissolved 2006); 2006 (as WFC Fulham, dissolved 2010); 2014 (as Fulham FC Foundation Ladies); 2018 (as Fulham FC Women)
- Ground: Motspur Park
- Capacity: 1,500
- Manager: Steve Jaye
- League: FA Women's National League South
- 2025–26: FA Women's National League Division One South East, 1st of 12 (promoted)
- Website: www.fulhamfc.com/women/
Home colours	Away colours	Third colours

Fulham FC Women, previously known as Fulham LFC, WFC Fulham and Fulham FC Foundation Ladies, is a women's football club based in London, England. The team were dissolved as of 16 May 2006, but were later re-established with independence from Fulham F.C. The club dissolved for a second time in June 2010 when sponsors pulled out following a second successive relegation. The club reformed again in 2014.

Fulham became the first Ladies' football team in Europe to turn full-time professional in April 2000; club chairman Mohamed Al-Fayed reverted the club to semi-professional status three years later, but the club reformed in 2014.

== History ==
Fulham L.F.C. were seen as the successor club to Friends of Fulham, winners of the FA Women's Cup in 1985 and twice runners-up in 1989 and 1990. After they moved to become Wimbledon L.F.C., Fulham F.C. re-established a women's team, with women's football becoming very popular by the early 1990s. Fulham L.F.C.'s debut came in 1993 in the Greater London Division, and they eventually reached the FA Women's National Premier League, via the Greater London Premier Division, the South East Combination League and the FA Women's Premier League Southern Division, mirroring the progress of the men's professional club. After becoming professional themselves in 2000, a huge investment paid dividends in their first season, 2000–01, as they reached the FA Women's Cup final and won the South East Combination Women's Football League by a comfortable margin. Star players like Rachel Yankey and Katie Chapman were supplemented by high-profile overseas imports like Marianne Pettersen.

In the 2001–02 season, they won the FA Women's Premier League Southern Division, the London County Cup, the FA Women's Premier League Cup and the FA Women's Cup, scoring 342 goals and conceding just 15.

Fulham won the treble of FA Women's Cup, League Cup and Premier League in 2002–03, scoring 68 goals and conceding just 13. In 2003–04 they were the only English team to compete in the UEFA Women's Cup, and they came second in the Premier League National Division, despite reverting to semi-pro status at the end of the previous season.

During the 2005–06 season, having lost most of their professional squad, they struggled in the league and finished eighth.

On 16 May 2006, Fulham FC announced that they were withdrawing the team from the Women's Premier League and discontinuing the team altogether. The decision to dissolve the team was made on financial grounds, with Fulham officially laying the blame on a poor media coverage and poor league attendance. Fulham did announce plans to continue its Girls Development Centre, but clearly stated they would not be fielding any further league teams in the foreseeable future.

Following the withdrawal of the funding of the Ladies, Fulham FC let club officers, parents and players take over in order that the team could continue playing at the highest level of women's football – the FA Women's Premier League. A similar fate befell several other ladies' teams at around the same time. As there was no remaining connection with Fulham FC, it was decided to alter the club's name to Fulham WFC and then WFC Fulham, in order to make this separation clear.

The new committee was presented with a number of difficult problems to solve. Season 2006–2007 saw the club survive, albeit with the relegation of the first team from the Premier League National Division, but with the bonus of a County Cup final appearance. The team bounced straight back by winning the Premier League Southern Division in 2007–08, thanks largely to the goals of Ann-Marie Heatherson.

In 2008–09, WFC Fulham finished 12th and were relegated from the National Division. Another relegation into the Combination League followed in 2009–10 and the club folded due to the withdrawal of their sponsors.

In 2014, the club reformed once more, as Fulham FC Foundation Ladies and entered the London & South East Regional Women's League. Officially becoming re-incorporated into Fulham FC and rebranding as Fulham FC Women in 2018.

On 20 November 2022, Fulham FC Women played its first match back at Craven Cottage since the club's reformation. The match was against AFC Wimbledon in a Capital Cup match, resulting in a 3–1 defeat. The match had the club's highest attendance of 3,181 since the reformation.

== Players ==
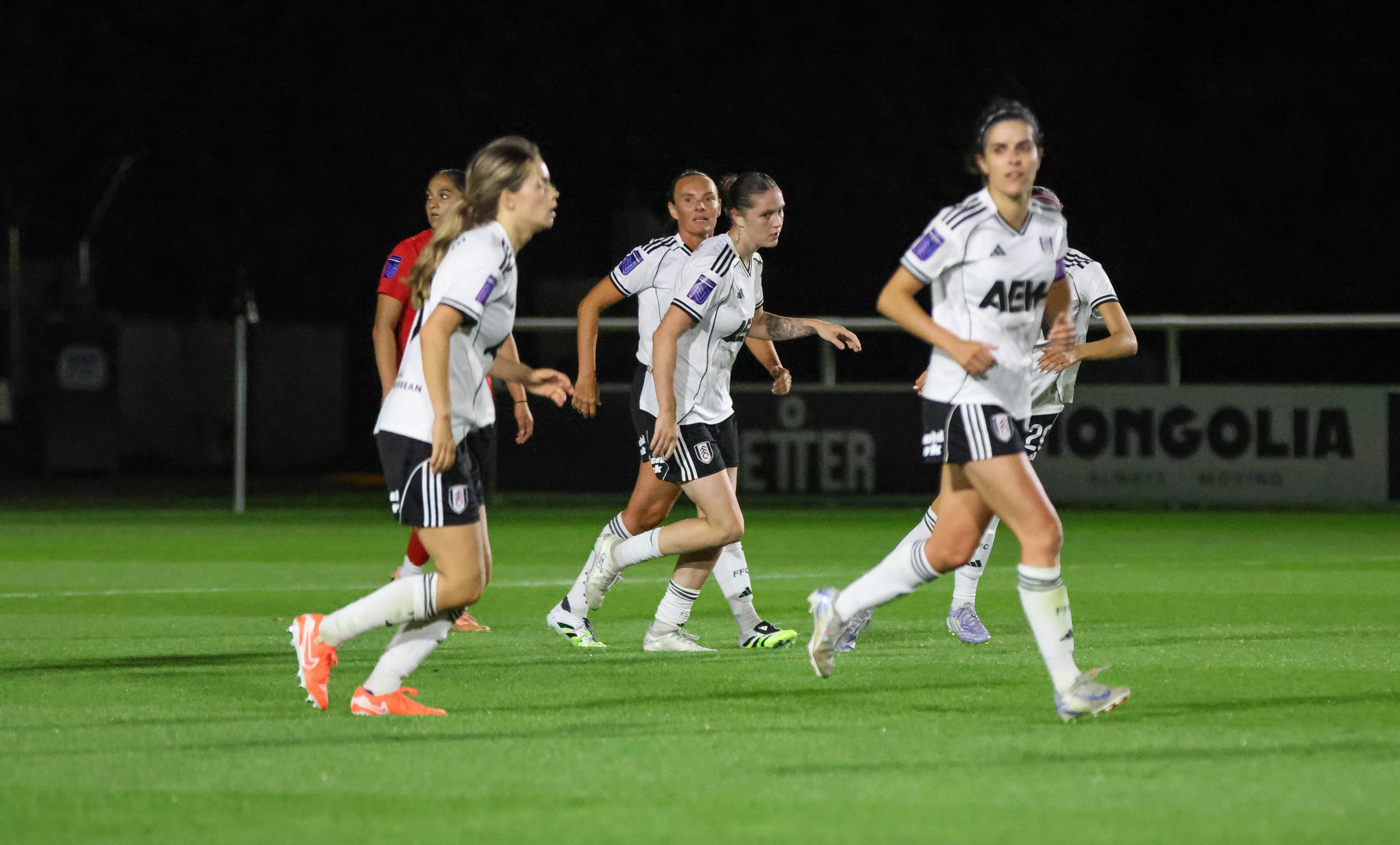
Fulham Women in August 2025

=== Current squad ===
As of 25 August 2026

Note: Flags indicate national team as defined under FIFA eligibility rules; some limited exceptions apply. Players may hold more than one non-FIFA nationality.

No.	Pos.	Nation	Player
1	GK	ENG	Frankie Gibbs
3	DF	ENG	Izzy Milne
4	DF	ENG	Leeta Rutherford
6	DF	ENG	Hannah MacKenzie
8	DF	ENG	Becky Stormer (vice-captain)
9	FW	ENG	Ellie Olds
10	FW	ENG	Sophie Gillies
11	FW	ENG	Leila Lister
12	MF	ENG	Stella Gandee Morgan
14	DF	ENG	Harley Bennett
15	GK	ENG	Jessica Gray
16	MF	ENG	Annie Rolf

No.	Pos.	Nation	Player
17	MF	WAL	Charlie Estcourt
18	DF	ENG	Taomë Oliver
19	MF	ENG	Lily Stevens
20	DF	ENG	Olivia Dale
21	FW	ENG	Katie Dungate
22	FW	ENG	Anna Grey
23	MF	ENG	Molly Holder
24	MF	ENG	Beau Parker
28	MF	ENG	Jade Bradley (captain)
29	FW	ENG	Rianna Dean
44	GK	ENG	Jacqui Goldsmid

== Honours ==
For a detailed international record, see English women's football clubs in international competitions

- FA Women's Premier League National Division
  - Champions: 2002–03
- FA Women's National League
  - Champions: 2001–02, 2007–08, 2025-26
- London and South East Women's Regional Football League
  - Champions: 2024–25
- FA Women's Cup
  - Winners: 1985 (as Friends of Fulham), 2002, 2003
    - Runners-up: 1989, 1990 (as Friends of Fulham), 2001
- FA Women's Premier League Cup
  - Winners: 2002, 2003
    - Runners-up: 2004
- London County Cup
  - Winners: 2002–03

== See also ==
- Women's football (soccer)
- List of women's football teams
