= 2003–04 Arsenal L.F.C. season =

English women's football club season

Arsenal Ladies
2003–04 season
- Chairman: Peter Hill-Wood
- Manager: Vic Akers
- Stadium: Clarence Park
- Premier League: Champions
- FA Cup: Winners
- Premier League Cup: Semi finals
- London County Cup: Winners
- Top goalscorer: League: Jayne Ludlow (18); All: Jayne Ludlow (29)
- Biggest win: 11–1 (vs Cardiff City (H), FA Cup, 7 February 2004)
- Biggest defeat: 1–2 (vs Charlton Athletic (A), Premier League, 16 October 2003); 1–2 (vs Charlton Athletic (A), Premier League Cup, 14 December 2003)
Home colours	Away colours

The 2003–04 season was Arsenal Ladies Football Club's 17th season since forming in 1987. The club participated in the National Division of the FA Women's Premier League, and reclaimed their League Title back from Fulham, defeating them at Highbury on the final day of the season to do so. They won the FA Cup as well, defeating Charlton Athletic 3–0 in the final to complete a domestic double. However, they missed out on the Premier League Cup once again, losing in the Semi Finals to Charlton Athletic. With no Europe to contend with this season, the only other silverware up for grabs was the London County Cup, which Arsenal also won after beating Fulham 4–0 in the Final.

Following their 2–1 defeat to Charlton Athletic in October, Arsenal went unbeaten in the League for the next 108 League matches, a run that ended in 2009 with a 3–0 defeat at home to Everton.

This was Arsenal's last season using Clarence Park as their home ground, ending their two-season stay at St Albans. The following season, Arsenal returned to Boreham Wood's ground, Meadow Park. This would remain their main home for the next 20 years.

Arsenal's final game of the season against Fulham was played at Highbury. This was the last time the Women's team played at Highbury before the club moved to their new residence at Emirates Stadium in 2006.

== Squad information & statistics ==
=== First team squad ===
Squad statistics correct as of May 2004

Squad No.	Name	Date of birth (age)	Since	Signed from
Goalkeepers
1	(Republic of Ireland) Emma Byrne	14 June 1979 (aged 25)	2000	(Denmark) Fortuna Hjørring
13	(Scotland) Caroline Collie	11 August 1986 (aged 17)	2002	(England) Arsenal Academy
	(England) Jasmine Cripps	4 November 1985 (aged 18)	1998	(England) Arsenal Academy
Defenders
2	(England) Kirsty Pealling	14 April 1975 (aged 29)	1987	(England) Arsenal Academy
5	(England) Leanne Champ	10 August 1983 (aged 20)	2001	(England) Millwall Lionesses
6	(England) Faye White	2 February 1978 (aged 26)	1996	(England) Three Bridges
11	(England) Clare Wheatley	4 February 1971 (aged 33)	1995	(England) Chelsea
12	(England) Julie Fletcher	28 September 1974 (aged 29)	2001	(England) Charlton Athletic
15	(Republic of Ireland) Yvonne Tracy	27 February 1981 (aged 23)	2000	(Republic of Ireland) St Patrick's Athletic
17	(England) Hayley Kemp	23 June 1987 (aged 17)	1998	(England) Hatfield Youth
18	(England) Anita Asante	27 April 1985 (aged 19)	1998	(England) Arsenal Academy
24	(England) Georgie Adams	7 November 1984 (aged 19)	1999	(England) Bushey
30	(England) Carol Harwood	1 December 1965 (aged 38)	2002	(England) Southampton Saints
	(England) Cori Daniels	4 June 1986 (aged 18)	2002	(England) Charlton Athletic
Midfielders
4	(Wales) Jayne Ludlow	7 January 1979 (aged 25)	2000	(England) Southampton Saints
7	(England) Sian Williams (c)	2 February 1968 (aged 36)	1990	(England) Millwall Lionesses
8	(Republic of Ireland) Ciara Grant	17 May 1978 (aged 26)	1998	(Republic of Ireland) St Patrick's Athletic
16	(England) Emma Thomas	17 October 1983 (aged 20)	1996	(England) Arsenal Academy
21	(England) Lisa Burrows	1 August 1985 (aged 18)	2002	(England) Bushey Rangers
22	(England) Jo Potter	13 November 1984 (aged 19)	2003	(England) Birmingham City
23	(Wales) Eleri Earnshaw	17 May 1985 (aged 19)	2003	(England) Barnet
	(England) Leanne Small	29 September 1982 (aged 18)	2000	(England) Watford
	(South Africa) Portia Modise	20 June 1983 (aged 21)	2003	(South Africa) Sowedo
	(South Africa) Veronica Phewa		2003	
	(South Africa) Toni Carelse		2003	
Forwards
3	(Scotland) Julie Fleeting	18 December 1980 (aged 23)	2004	(Scotland) Ross County
9	(England) Alex Scott	14 October 1984 (aged 19)	2000	(England) Arsenal Academy
10	(England) Ellen Maggs	16 February 1983 (aged 21)	1997	(England) Arsenal Academy
14	(England) Lianne Sanderson	3 February 1988 (aged 16)	2003	(England) Arsenal Academy
19	(Japan) Mihoko Ishida	19 June 1982 (aged 22)	2003	(Japan) Musashigaoka
20	(England) Justine Lorton	11 March 1974 (aged 30)	2003	(England) Charlton Athletic
	(England) Mikaela Howell	12 July 1988 (aged 15)	1999	(England) Southampton Women

=== Appearances and goals ===
No.	Name	PLND		FA Cup		PL Cup		LC Cup		Total	
No.	Name	Apps	Goals	Apps	Goals	Apps	Goals	Apps	Goals	Apps	Goals
Goalkeepers
1	(Republic of Ireland) Emma Byrne	18	0	5	0	4	0	3	0	30	0
13	(Scotland) Caroline Collie	0	0	0	0	0	0	0	0	0	0
	(England) Jasmine Cripps	0	0	0	0	0	0	0	0	0	0
Defenders
2	(England) Kirsty Pealling	18	3	3+1	0	3	0	3	2	27+1	5
5	(England) Leanne Champ	13	0	4	3	4	0	2	0	23	3
6	(England) Faye White	13	0	5	2	3	0	1	0	22	2
11	(England) Clare Wheatley	16+1	0	5	0	1	0	3	0	25+1	0
12	(England) Julie Fletcher	0	0	0	0	1	0	0	0	1	0
15	(Republic of Ireland) Yvonne Tracy	10	1	3	1	4	0	2	0	19	2
17	(England) Hayley Kemp	2+2	0	0+1	0	3	1	0+1	0	5+4	1
18	(England) Anita Asante	7+6	0	2	0	2+1	0	2	0	13+7	0
24	(England) Georgie Adams	0	0	0	0	0	0	0	0	0	0
30	(England) Carol Harwood	0+1	0	0	0	0	0	0	0	0+1	0
	(England) Gilly Flaherty	0	0	0	0	0	0	0	0	0	0
	(England) Cori Daniels	0	0	0	0	0	0	0	0	0	0
Midfielders
4	(Wales) Jayne Ludlow	18	18	5	1	3+1	4	3	6	29+1	29
7	(England) Sian Williams (c)	7+1	0	1	0	0	0	2	0	10+1	0
8	(Republic of Ireland) Ciara Grant	18	10	5	0	3	4	3	0	29	14
16	(England) Emma Thomas	0	0	0	0	1+1	1	0	0	1+1	1
21	(England) Lisa Burrows	0	0	0	0	0	0	0	0	0	0
22	(England) Jo Potter	6+10	2	3+2	2	1+2	1	3	4	14+14	9
23	(Wales) Eleri Earnshaw	0+1	0	0	0	0	0	0	0	1+1	0
	(South Africa) Veronica Phewa	0+1	0	1	0	0	0	0	0	1+1	0
	(South Africa) Portia Modise	0	0	0	0	0	0	0	0	0	0
	(South Africa) Toni Carelse	0	0	0	0	0	0	0	0	0	0
Forwards
3	(Scotland) Julie Fleeting	6	7	4	9	0	0	0	0	10	16
9	(England) Alex Scott	9+6	5	0+5	0	2+1	0	2+1	2	13+13	7
10	(England) Ellen Maggs	18	9	5	2	3	0	1+2	1	27+2	12
14	(England) Lianne Sanderson	11+4	6	4	3	3+1	1	2+1	1	20+6	11
19	(Japan) Mihoko Ishida	0+3	0	0	0	1	0	0	0	1+3	0
20	(England) Justine Lorton	7+4	1	0+4	2	2+2	1	0+2	1	9+12	5
	(England) Mikaela Howell	0	0	0	0	0	0	0	0	0	0

=== Goalscorers ===
Rank	No.	Position	Name	PLND	FA Cup	PL Cup	LC Cup	Total
1	4	MF	(Wales) Jayne Ludlow	18	1	4	6	29
2	3	FW	(Scotland) Julie Fleeting	7	9	0	0	16
3	8	MF	(Republic of Ireland) Ciara Grant	10	0	4	0	14
4	10	FW	(England) Ellen Maggs	9	2	0	1	12
5	14	FW	(England) Lianne Sanderson	6	3	1	1	11
6	22	MF	(England) Jo Potter	2	2	1	4	9
7	9	FW	(England) Alex Scott	5	0	0	2	7
8	20	FW	(England) Justine Lorton	1	2	1	1	5
8	2	DF	(England) Kirsty Pealling	3	0	0	2	5
10	5	DF	(England) Leanne Champ	0	3	0	0	3
11	6	DF	(England) Faye White	0	2	0	0	2
11	15	DF	(Republic of Ireland) Yvonne Tracy	1	1	0	0	2
13	16	MF	(England) Emma Thomas	0	0	1	0	1
13	17	DF	(England) Hayley Kemp	0	0	1	0	1
Total				62	25	13	17	117

=== Clean sheets ===
Rank	No.	Name	PLND	FA Cup	PL Cup	LC Cup	Total
1	1	(Republic of Ireland) Emma Byrne	9	3	2	3	17
Total			9	3	2	3	17

== Transfers, loans and other signings ==
=== Transfers in ===
Announcement date	No.	Position	Player	From club
2003	22	MF	(England) Jo Potter	(England) Birmingham City
2003	19	FW	(Japan) Mihoko Ishida	(Japan) Musashigaoka
2003	20	FW	(England) Justine Lorton	(England) Charlton Athletic
2003	23	MF	(Wales) Eleri Earnshaw	(England) Barnet
12 August 2003		MF	(South Africa) Veronica Phewa	
12 August 2003		MF	(South Africa) Portia Modise	(South Africa) Sowedo
12 August 2003		MF	(South Africa) Toni Carelse	
10 January 2004	3	FW	(Scotland) Julie Fleeting	(Scotland) Ross County

=== Transfers out ===
Announcement date	No.	Position	Player	To club
2003	8	FW	(England) Angela Banks	Retired
2003	3	DF	(Scotland) Pauline MacDonald	Retired
2003	24	FW	(Republic of Ireland) Michele O'Brien	(United States) Long Island Lady Riders
2003	14	MF	(England) Gemma Ritchie	(England) Fulham
2003	20	FW	(England) Sheuneen Ta	(United States) Miami Hurricanes
2003		FW	(England) Nicole Emmanuel	(England) Leeds United
2003	17	FW	(Wales) Ayshea Martyn	(England) Bristol Rovers
2003	13	GK	(Wales) Jo Price	(England) Bristol City
2003		DF	(England) Kelley Few	Retirement
2003		MF	(Republic of Ireland) Carol Conlon	(England) Chelsea
2003		MF	(Northern Ireland) Alana Livingstone	
2003		FW	(England) Rochelle Shakes	
2003		FW	Coreen Brown	
9 July 2003		DF	(England) Laura Husselbee	(England) Birmingham City
November 2003	12	DF	(England) Julie Fletcher	(England) Charlton Athletic

== Club ==
=== Kit ===
Supplier: Nike / Sponsor: O2.

Home	Away

== Non-competitive ==
=== Pre-season ===
19 July 2003	Enfield Town	0–9	Arsenal	Hatfield
18:00 BST		Report	Grant; Sanderson; Champ; Ishida; Edite; Tessy	Stadium: Queenswood School

20 July 2003	Watford	0–5	Arsenal
		Report	Grant; Couto; Sanderson

24 July 2003	Brighton & Hove Albion	0–4	Arsenal	Falmer
18:30 BST		Report	Grant; Ludlow; Ishida	Stadium: University of Sussex

27 July 2003	Millwall Lionesses	0–7	Arsenal	Queenswood School
14:00 BST		Report	Ludlow; Grant; Maggs; Ishida

3 August 2003	Kilmarnock	5–0	Arsenal
			Goal

4 August 2003	Hibernian	0–1	Arsenal
		Report	Ludlow

9 August 2003	Arsenal	1–5	North Carolina University
	Grant (pen.)	Report	(pen.)

13 August 2003	Langford	1–3	Arsenal	Langford
19:45 BST	Goal	Report	Modise (pen.); Ludlow 75'	Stadium: Forde Park

14 August 2003	Musashigaoka	1–9	Arsenal
	Goal	Report	Goal

10 September 2003	Athletico Bilbao	0–0	Arsenal
		Report

== Competitions ==
=== Overall record ===
Competition	First match	Last match	Starting round	Final position	Record							
Competition	First match	Last match	Starting round	Final position	Pld	W	D	L	GF	GA	GD	Win %
FA Women's Premier League National Division	17 August 2003	15 May 2004	Matchday 1	Winners	18	15	2	1	65	11	+54	83.33
FA Women's Cup	4 January 2004	3 May 2004	Fourth round	Winners	5	5	0	0	25	2	+23	100.00
FA Women's Premier League Cup	14 September 2003	14 December 2003	First round	Semi-finals	4	3	0	1	13	4	+9	75.00
London County Cup	18 January 2004	7 April 2004	First round	Winners	3	3	0	0	17	0	+17	100.00
Total					30	26	2	2	120	17	+103	86.67

Last updated: 24 May 2026
Source: FA WPL

=== FA Women's Premier League National Division ===
==== Partial league table ====
Pos	Team	Pld	W	D	L	GF	GA	GD	Pts	Qualification or relegation
1	Arsenal (C)	18	15	2	1	65	11	+54	47	Qualification for the UEFA Cup qualifying round
2	Charlton Athletic	18	15	1	2	52	17	+35	46	
3	Fulham	18	14	2	2	60	20	+40	44	
4	Leeds United	18	8	4	6	32	28	+4	28	
5	Doncaster Rovers Belles	18	8	3	7	41	40	+1	27	

Source: FA WPL
(C) Champions

==== Results summary ====
Overall								Home						Away					
Pld	W	D	L	GF	GA	GD	Pts	W	D	L	GF	GA	GD	W	D	L	GF	GA	GD
18	15	2	1	65	11	+54	47	8	1	0	34	3	+31	7	1	1	31	8	+23

==== Results by matchday ====
Matchday	1	2	3	4	5	6	7	8	9	10	11	12	13	14	15	16	17	18
Ground	A	H	A	A	H	A	A	A	H	H	A	A	H	H	A	H	H	H
Result	W	D	W	W	W	L	D	W	W	W	W	W	W	W	W	W	W	W
Position	1	2	2	2	3	4	3	3	3	5	3	3	3	3	2	2	2	1

Source: FA WPL
W = Win; D = Draw; L = Loss

==== Matches ====
17 August 2003 1	Tranmere Rovers	2–9	Arsenal	Heswall
	Holden; Carubia	Report	Ludlow 8'; Scott; Maggs; Sanderson; Lorton	Stadium: Gayton Park

24 August 2003 2	Arsenal	0–0	Everton	St Albans
14:00 GMT		Report	Woodhead (yellow card); Vaughan (yellow card); Byrne (yellow card)	Stadium: Clarence Park; Referee: Mr M J Asplen

31 August 2003 3	Aston Villa	1–7	Arsenal	Sutton Coldfield
14:00 BST	Smith 15'	Report	Scott 35'; Saggs (o.g.); Ludlow; Maggs; Grant (pen.)	Stadium: Central Ground

7 September 2003 4	Doncaster Rovers Belles	0–2	Arsenal	Doncaster
		Report	Ludlow 25', 83'	Stadium: Belle Vue

5 October 2003 5	Arsenal	7–0	Doncaster Rovers Belles	St Albans
	Maggs 6', 62'; Ludlow 9'; Tracy 20'; Scott 22'; Grant 56', 77'	Report		Stadium: Clarence Park

16 October 2003 6	Charlton Athletic	2–1	Arsenal	Charlton
19:45 BST	Pond 16'; Stoney 56'; Williams (yellow card) 89'	Report	Ludlow 30'	Stadium: The Valley; Attendance: 3,560; Referee: C Turner

26 October 2003 7	Fulham	1–1	Arsenal	Motspur Park
	McArthur 52'	Report	Grant 90+6'	Stadium: Motspur Park

23 November 2003 8	Bristol Rovers	0–3	Arsenal	Bristol
		Report	Martyn 35' (o.g.); Ludlow 50'; Maggs 78'	Stadium: Memorial Stadium

7 December 2003 9	Arsenal	6–0	Tranmere Rovers	St Albans
14:00 GMT	Ludlow 23', 60', 85'; Sanderson; Pealling	Report		Stadium: Clarence Park

22 February 2004 10	Arsenal	3–1	Bristol Rovers	St Albans
	Ludlow 43'; Sanderson 46'; Grant 49'	Report	Williams 35'	Stadium: Clarence Park

4 March 2004 11	Birmingham City	0–3	Arsenal	Redditch
		Report	Potter 17'; Sanderson 70'; Grant 85'	Stadium: Valley Stadium

7 March 2004 12	Leeds United	1–2	Arsenal	Garforth
	Culvin 30' (pen.)	Report	Ludlow 58'; Fleeting 85'	Stadium: Wheatley Park

21 March 2004 13	Arsenal	4–0	Leeds United	Borehamwood
14:00 GMT	Pealling 16', 42'; Grant 60'; Fleeting 71'	Report		Stadium: Meadow Park

28 March 2004 14	Arsenal	2–1	Birmingham City	St Albans
	Bassett 57' (o.g.); Ludlow 85'	Report	Gallagher 6'	Stadium: Clarence Park

4 April 2003 15	Everton	1–3	Arsenal	Crosby
	McDougall 46'	Report	Ludlow 31'; Potter 36'; Grant 71'	Stadium: Rossett Park

15 April 2004 16	Arsenal	1–0	Charlton Athletic	Borehamwood
19:45 BST	Fleeting 66'	Report		Stadium: Meadow Park; Referee: Mr M Asplen

18 April 2004 17	Arsenal	8–0	Aston Villa	St Albans
	Fleeting 21', 60', 69'; Maggs 44'; Ludlow 47'; Potter 49'; Grant 50', 58'	Report		Stadium: Clarence Park

15 May 2004 18	Arsenal	3–1	Fulham	Highbury
19:00 BST	Sanderson 38'; Fleeting 53'; Maggs 90'	Report	McArthur 85'	Stadium: Highbury; Referee: Carl Henry

=== FA Women's Cup ===
4 January 2004 Fourth round	Arsenal	3–0	Stockport County	St Albans
13:00 GMT	Champ 18'; White 75'; Tracy 80'	Report		Stadium: Clarence Park

25 January 2004 Fifth round	Middlesbrough	1–6	Arsenal	Stockton-on-Tees
12:00 GMT	Ford	Report	Sanderson; Ludlow; Fleeting; Potter; White (red card) 80'	Stadium: Bishopton Road West

8 February 2004 Quarter-finals	Arsenal	11–1	Cardiff City	London Colney
14:15 GMT	Maggs 24', 70'; Fleeting 28', 57', 80'; Champ 78'; Potter 55', 75'; Lorton	Report	Fishlock 43'	Stadium: Arsenal Training Centre

14 March 2004 Semi-finals	Bristol Rovers	0–2	Arsenal	Bristol
15:00 GMT		Report	Fleeting 73'; White 77'	Stadium: Memorial Stadium; Attendance: 1,382

3 May 2004 Final	Arsenal	3–0	Charlton Athletic	Shepherd's Bush
13:00 BST	Fleeting 23', 25', 85'; Pealling (yellow card) 57'; Ludlow (yellow card) 82'	Report	Cope (yellow card) 88'	Stadium: Loftus Road; Attendance: 12,244; Referee: Amy Rayner

=== FA Women's Premier League Cup ===
14 September 2003 First round	Arsenal	4–0	Ipswich Town	St Albans
	Thomas 18'; Ludlow; Potter 90'	Report		Stadium: Clarence Park

12 October 2003 Second round	Arsenal	4–2	Sunderland	St Albans
	Lorton 25'; Grant 30' 80'	Report	Houghton 7'; Lanaghan 51'	Stadium: Clarence Park

2 November 2003 Quarter-finals	Arsenal	4–0	Doncaster Rovers Belles	St Albans
	Kemp 4'; Ludlow 45', 64'; Sanderson 78'	Report		Stadium: Clarence Park

14 December 2003 Semi-finals	Charlton Athletic	2–1	Arsenal	Gravesend
14:00 GMT	Hunn 8'; Coss (yellow card) 9'; Barr (penalty missed) 45' 65'	Report	Grant 74'; Champ (yellow card); Lorton (yellow card)	Stadium: Stonebridge Road

=== London County Cup ===
18 January 2004 First round	Arsenal	4–0	Millwall Lionesses	St Albans
	Ludlow 35', 49', 51'; Pealling 43'	Report		Stadium: Clarence Park

15 February 2004 Semi-finals	AFC Wimbledon	0–9	Arsenal	Kingston upon Thames
10:30 GMT		Report	Ludlow 22' 23'; Potter 25'; Maggs; Sanderson; Scott	Stadium: Kingsmeadow

7 April 2004 Final	Arsenal	4–0	Fulham	East Molesey
19:30 BST	Potter; Scott; Pealling; Lorton	Report		Stadium: Imber Court

== See also ==
- List of Arsenal W.F.C. seasons
- 2003–04 in English football
