= 1994–95 Arsenal L.F.C. season =

English women's football club season

Arsenal Ladies
1994–95 season
- Chairman: Peter Hill-Wood
- Manager: Vic Akers
- Stadium: The Lantern Stadium
- Premier League: Winners
- FA Cup: Winners
- Middlesex County Senior Cup: Runners Up
- London County Cup: Winners
- Biggest win: 8–1 (vs Leyton Orient (A), FA Cup, 12 February 1995)
- Biggest defeat: 0–3 (vs Wembley (N), Middlesex County Senior Cup, 06 May 1995)
Home colours	Away colours	Third colours

The 1994–95 season was Arsenal Ladies Football Club's 8th season since forming in 1987. The club participated in the National Division of the FA Women's Premier League, winning their second League Title since promotion. They also clinched the FA Cup after defeating Liverpool 3–2 in the Final. With no League Cup due to the FA wanting players to be prepared for the upcoming 1995 World Cup, Arsenal participated in a bespoke alternate competition, the Middlesex County Senior Cup. They reached the final, hosted at Highbury, but lost to Wembley 3–0. They also took part in the first edition of the London County Cup, defeating Millwall Lionesses in the Final.

Arsenal moved from Southbury Road to The Lantern Stadium at the start of the season. However, their stay in Potters Bar was brief, as in the following season, they moved to Hayes Lane in Bromley.

== Squad information & statistics ==
=== First team squad ===
Name	Date of Birth (Age)	Since	Signed From
Goalkeepers
(England) Pauline Cope	16 February 1969 (aged 26)	1994	(England) Millwall Lionesses
(England) Kathy Simmons	16 February 1969 (aged 26)	1991	(England) Tottenham
(England) Nancy Jeffery	18 February 1978 (aged 17)	1989	(England) Limehouse
Defenders
(England) Kirsty Pealling	14 April 1975 (aged 20)	1987	(England) Arsenal Academy
(England) Michelle Curley	30 April 1972 (aged 23)	1987	(England) Arsenal Academy
(England) Jenny Canty	22 March 1976 (aged 19)	1991	(England) Limehouse
(England) Vicki Slee	9 March 1973 (aged 22)	1991	(England) Millwall Lionesses
(England) Kelley Few	17 October 1971 (aged 23)	1991	(England) Romford
(Northern Ireland) Gill Wylie (c)	27 August 1965 (aged 29)	1991	(England) Tottenham
(England) Kellie Battams	17 January 1977 (aged 18)	1989	(England) Arsenal Academy
(England) Amy Lamont	5 May 1974 (aged 21)	1989	(England) Arsenal Academy
(England) Lisa Spry	15 January 1968 (aged 27)	1989	(England) Islington
(England) Carly Cruickshank		1992	(England) Limehouse
Midfielders
(England) Sian Williams	2 February 1968 (aged 27)	1990	(England) Millwall Lionesses
(England) Emma Hayes	18 October 1976 (aged 18)	1991	(England) Arsenal Academy
(England) Sammy Britton	8 December 1973 (aged 21)	1993	(England) Bronte
(England) Emma Coss	9 May 1979 (aged 16)	1992	(England) Arsenal Academy
(England) Sharon Barber	27 May 1969 (aged 26)	1988	(England) Tottenham
(England) Michelle Lee	1974 (aged 21)	1988	(England) Arsenal Academy
(England) Sarah Clark	1972 (aged 23)	1993	(England) Ipswich Town
(England) Liz Benham	1975 (aged 19)	1993	(England) Wimbledon
Adele Hinder		1994	(England) Millwall Lionesses
Forwards
(England) Marieanne Spacey	13 February 1966 (aged 29)	1993	(England) Wimbledon
(Wales) Naz Ball	28 February 1961 (aged 34)	1987	(England) Aylesbury
(England) Jo Churchman	8 October 1963 (aged 31)	1990	(England) Millwall Lionesses
(Scotland) Michelle Sneddon	18 January 1974 (aged 21)	1989	(Scotland) Coltness
(England) Becky Lonergan	18 January 1977 (aged 18)	1993	(England) Bronte
(England) Kelly Townshend	12 May 1977 (aged 18)	1988	(England) Arsenal Academy
(England) Christine Couling	4 August 1967 (aged 27)	1994	Retirement
(United States) Tiffany Schreiner	1971 (aged 23)	1994	(United States) Central Florida University
(England) Pat Pile	1964 (aged 31)	1989	(England) Hackney
(England) Andrea Wright		1989	(England) Chelmsford
(England) Karen Philp		1993	(England) Hassocks Beacon
(England) Krista Yeomans		1991	(England) Arsenal Academy
Unknown
Joanne Cook	1973 (aged 22)	1993	(England) Arsenal Academy

=== Goalscorers ===
Rank	Position	Name	PLND	FA Cup	MC Cup	LC Cup	Total
1	FW	(England) Marieanne Spacey	21	8	1	1	31
2	FW	(England) Sammy Britton	12	2	0	0	14
3	FW	(England) Becky Lonergan	8	4	0	1	13
4	DF	(Northern Ireland) Gill Wylie (c)	4	1	1	0	6
4	FW	(Wales) Naz Ball	1	1	4	0	6
4	FW	(England) Jo Churchman	4	1	0	1	6
7	DF	(England) Kirsty Pealling	1	2	0	0	3
8	MF	(England) Sian Williams	1	1	0	0	2
8	DF	(England) Kelley Few	1	0	0	1	2
10	MF	(England) Sharon Barber	1	0	0	0	1
10	DF	(England) Kelly Townsend	0	0	1	0	1
10	FW	(England) Michelle Lee	0	0	0	1	1
10	FW	(Scotland) Michelle Sneddon	0	0	0	1	1
Unknown goalscorer			5	0	6	2	13
Own goal			1	0	0	0	1
Total			60	20	13	8	101

=== Clean sheets ===
Rank	Name	PLND	FA Cup	MC Cup	LC Cup	Total
1	(England) Pauline Cope	7	0	0	0	7
2	(England) Kathy Simmons	0	0	0	0	0
2	(England) Nancy Jeffery	0	0	0	0	0
Unknown goalkeeper		4	1	1	1	7
Total		11	1	1	1	14

== Transfers, loans and other signings ==
=== Transfers in ===
Announcement date	Position	Player	From club
1994	GK	(England) Pauline Cope	(England) Millwall Lionesses
1994	FW	(United States) Tiffany Schreiner	(United States) Central Florida University
October 1994	FW	(England) Christine Couling	Retirement
December 1994	MF	Adele Hinder	(England) Millwall Lionesses

=== Transfers out ===
Announcement date	Position	Player	To club
1994	MF	(England) Debbie Bampton	(England) Croydon
1994	GK	(England) Lesley Shipp	(England) Wembley
1994	GK	(England) Ruth Gold	Retired
1994	FW	(England) Debbie Smith	
1994	FW	(England) Claudia Woodley	
January 1995	FW	(England) Karen Philp	Retired

== Club ==
=== Kit ===
Supplier: Nike / Sponsor: JVC

Home	Away	Third

== Non-competitive ==
=== Pre-season ===
Sonderborg	0–1	Arsenal
	Report	Wylie

Barde IF	0–0	Arsenal
	Report

Gronbjerg	0–1	Arsenal
	Report	Lonergan

Alvangen	1–1	Arsenal
Goal	Report	Lee

Town and County	1–5	Arsenal
Goal	Report	Sneddon; Spacey; Few; Britton

== Competitions ==
=== Overall record ===
Competition	First match	Last match	Starting round	Final position	Record							
Competition	First match	Last match	Starting round	Final position	Pld	W	D	L	GF	GA	GD	Win %
FA Women's Premier League National Division	4 September 1994	4 June 1995	Matchday 1	Winners	18	17	1	0	60	8	+52	94.44
FA Women's Cup	4 December 1994	30 April 1995	Fourth round	Winners	5	5	0	0	20	5	+15	100.00
Middlesex County Senior Cup	11 December 1994	6 May 1995	Quarter-finals	Runners-up	3	2	0	1	13	4	+9	66.67
London County Cup	5 February 1995	30 August 1995	Quarter-finals	Winners	3	3	0	0	8	3	+5	100.00
Total					29	27	1	1	101	20	+81	93.10

Last updated: 22 May 2026
Source: FA WPL

=== FA Women's Premier League National Division ===
==== Partial league table ====
Pos	Team	Pld	W	D	L	GF	GA	GD	Pts
1	Arsenal (C)	18	17	1	0	60	8	+52	52
2	Liverpool	18	12	3	3	58	17	+41	39
3	Doncaster Belles	18	12	2	4	56	25	+31	38
4	Croydon	18	9	2	7	42	24	+18	29
5	Wembley	18	8	3	7	34	17	+17	27

Source: FA WPL
(C) Champions

==== Results summary ====
Overall								Home						Away					
Pld	W	D	L	GF	GA	GD	Pts	W	D	L	GF	GA	GD	W	D	L	GF	GA	GD
18	17	1	0	60	8	+52	52	9	0	0	32	2	+30	8	1	0	28	6	+22

==== Results by matchday ====
Matchday	1	2	3	4	5	6	7	8	9	10	11	12	13	14	15	16	17	18
Ground	H	A	H	A	H	H	H	A	A	H	A	H	H	A	H	A	A	A
Result	W	W	W	W	W	W	W	W	W	W	W	W	W	W	W	W	W	D
Position	1	1	1	1	1	1	1	1	1	1	1	1	1	1	1	1	1	1

Source: FA WPL
W = Win; D = Draw; L = Loss

==== Matches ====
4 September 1994 1	Arsenal	5–1	Leasowe Pacific	Potters Bar
14:00 BST	(o.g.); Spacey; Britton	Report	Collins	Stadium: The Lantern Stadium; Referee: G. Pope

11 September 1994 2	Ilkeston Town Rangers	0–2	Arsenal	Ilkeston
14:00 BST		Report	Lonergan 25'; Britton 65'	Stadium: New Manor Ground; Referee: D. Fox

25 September 1994 3	Arsenal	7–1	Wolverhampton Wanderers	Potters Bar
14:00 BST	Spacey; Britton; Wylie; Lonergan	Report	Goal	Stadium: The Lantern Stadium; Referee: S. Perrins

2 October 1994 4	Croydon	2–3	Arsenal	Croydon
14:00 BST	McCormick 49'; Sempare 67'	Report	Britton 24'; Lonergan 53'; Pealling 57'	Stadium: Croydon Sports Arena; Referee: P. Maskell

16 October 1994 5	Arsenal	1–0	Wembley	Potters Bar
14:00 BST	Britton 76'	Report		Stadium: The Lantern Stadium; Referee: S. Lomas

23 October 1994 6	Arsenal	3–0	Doncaster Belles	Potters Bar
14:00 BST	Britton 14'; Lonergan 75'; Churchman 84'	Report		Stadium: The Lantern Stadium

7 November 1994 7	Arsenal	6–0	Red Star Southampton	Potters Bar
12:00 GMT	Britton; Wylie; Lonergan; Spacey	Report		Stadium: The Lantern Stadium; Referee: A. Gibey

18 December 1994 8	Wolverhampton Wanderers	0–6	Arsenal	Wolverhampton
		Report	Spacey; Williams; Lonergan; Ball	Stadium: Noose Lane

22 January 1995 9	Leasowe Pacific	1–4	Arsenal	Crosby
	45'	Report	Spacey 15'; Barber 39'; Britton 50'; Few 75'	Stadium: Rossett Park

12 March 1995 10	Arsenal	3–0	Millwall Lionesses	Beckenham
12:00 GMT	Lonergan 4'; Britton 29'; Spacey 69'; Pealling (yellow card)	Report		Stadium: CUACO Sports Ground; Referee: M. Day (Hampshire)

26 March 1995 11	Wembley	1–3	Arsenal	Wembley
	Grant 15'	Report	Lonergan 60'; Spacey	Stadium: Vale Farm Sports Centre

2 April 1995 12	Arsenal	1–0	Liverpool	Potters Bar
12:00 BST	Churchman 80'	Report		Stadium: The Lantern Stadium

9 April 1995 13	Arsenal	2–0	Croydon	Potters Bar
12:00 BST	Spacey 75', 80' (pen.)	Report		Stadium: The Lantern Stadium; Referee: R. Daisley

16 April 1995 14	Doncaster Belles	1–2	Arsenal	Stainforth
14:00 GMT	Large 25'	Report	Spacey (penalty missed) 39' 64'; Wylie 70'	Stadium: Welfare Ground; Referee: P. Hagen

23 April 1995 15	Arsenal	4–0	Ilkeston Town Rangers	Highbury
12:30 BST	Spacey; Wylie	Report		Stadium: Highbury; Referee: I. Greenwood

2 May 1995 16	Red Star Southampton	1–3	Arsenal	Totton
20:00 BST	Kavecki	Report	Churchman; Spacey	Stadium: Testwood Park; Referee: R Castle

21 May 1995 17	Millwall Lionesses	0–5	Arsenal	New Eltham
		Report	Goal

4 June 1995 18	Liverpool	0–0	Arsenal	Kirkby
		Report		Stadium: Kirkby Sports Centre

=== FA Women's Cup ===
4 December 1994 Fourth round	Arsenal	3–0	Maidstone Tigresses	Potters Bar
12:30 GMT	Spacey 35'; Britton; Wylie	Report		Stadium: The Lantern Stadium; Referee: S. Ryan

15 January 1995 Fifth round	Arsenal	3–1	Leasowe Pacific	Potters Bar
12:00 GMT	Spacey 1'; Lonergan 32', 65'	Report	Goal	Stadium: The Lantern Stadium; Referee: D. Thomas

12 February 1995 Quarter-finals	Leyton Orient	1–8	Arsenal	Walthamstow
14:00 GMT	Goal	Report	Spacey; Williams; Pealling; Ball; Churchman	Stadium: Wadham Lodge

19 March 1995 Semi-finals	Doncaster Belles	1–3 (a.e.t.)	Arsenal	Rotherham
13:00 GMT	Walker 21'	Report	Britton 36'; Pealling 103'; Spacey 112'	Stadium: Millmoor; Attendance: 530; Referee: J. Hardy

30 April 1995 Final	Liverpool	2–3	Arsenal	Prenton
13:15 BST	Burke 24', 41'	Report	Lonergan 36', 55'; Spacey 81'	Stadium: Prenton Park; Attendance: 3,000; Referee: Jeff Winter

=== Middlesex County Senior Cup ===
11 December 1994 Quarter-finals	Barnet	0–6	Arsenal	Cockfosters
10:30 GMT			Goal	Stadium: Chalk Lane

5 February 1995 Semi-finals	Arsenal	7–1	Mill Hill United	Beckenham
	Ball 26', 50', 73', 79'; Townshend; Spacey 54'; Wylie 57'	Report	Keea 47'	Stadium: CUACO Sports Ground

6 May 1995 Final	Arsenal	0–3	Wembley	Highbury
18:00 BST		Report	Liran 8', 52'; Lorton 90'	Stadium: Highbury; Referee: Peter Clare

=== London County Cup ===
5 February 1995 Quarter-finals	Arsenal	2–0 (a.e.t.)	West Ham United	Beckenham
	Churchman; Lee	Report		Stadium: CUACO Sports Ground

21 April 1995 Semi-finals	Leyton Orient	1–2 (a.e.t.)	Arsenal	Walthamstow
	Goal		Goal	Stadium: Wadham Lodge

30 August 1995 Final	Arsenal	4–2	Millwall Lionesses	East Dulwich
20:00 BST	Sneddon 4'; Spacey 33'; Lonergan 35'; Few 60'		Lindsay 27'; Buckley 65' (pen.)	Stadium: Champion Hill; Attendance: 200; Referee: R T Daisley

== Arsenal reserves ==
=== Greater London Regional Women’s League Premier Division ===
==== League table ====
Pos	Team	Pld	W	D	L	GF	GA	GD	Pts
1	Leyton Orient (C)	18	14	2	2	89	24	+65	30
2	Tottenham Hotspur	18	14	1	3	77	26	+51	29
3	Arsenal Reserves	16	11	2	3	81	16	+65	24
4	Wembley Reserves	18	11	1	6	70	31	+39	23
5	Watford	17	10	0	7	43	48	−5	20
6	Lambeth	15	6	3	6	30	28	+2	15
7	Hackney	18	5	1	12	35	71	−36	11
8	Romford	17	4	2	11	38	73	−35	10
9	Wimbledon Reserves	17	3	2	12	34	67	−33	8
10	Drayton Wanderers	17	1	0	16	19	126	−107	2

Source: GLPD
(C) Champions

==== Matches ====
18 September 1994	Arsenal Reserves	12–0	Romford	Beckenham
				Stadium: CUACO Sports Ground

25 September 1994	Wimbledon Reserves	1–3	Arsenal Reserves
	Goal	Report	Coss; Sneddon

2 October 1994	Arsenal Reserves	17–0	Drayton Wanderers	Beckenham
	Townshend; Benham; Ball; Sneddon; Lamont; Wright	Report		Stadium: CUACO Sports Ground

16 October 1994	Arsenal Reserves	3–1	Tottenham Hotspur	Beckenham
	Townshend	Report		Stadium: CUACO Sports Ground

30 October 1994	Arsenal Reserves	0–0	Wembley Reserves	Beckenham
		Report		Stadium: CUACO Sports Ground

Arsenal Reserves	3–1	Leyton Orient	Beckenham
Ball; Townshend			Stadium: CUACO Sports Ground

Romford	0–8	Arsenal Reserves
		Ball; Sneddon; Pile

Wembley Reserves	3–2	Arsenal Reserves
Goal		Lee; Townshend

Leyton Orient	4–4	Arsenal Reserves
Goal		Sneddon; Pile; Wright

18 December 1994	Tottenham Hotspur	3–2	Arsenal Reserves
		Report

8 January 1995	Arsenal Reserves	3–0	Wimbledon Reserves	Beckenham
		Report		Stadium: CUACO Sports Ground

Arsenal Reserves	?–?	Watford

Arsenal Reserves	?–?	Hackney

Arsenal Reserves	?–?	Lambeth

Watford	?–?	Arsenal Reserves

Hackney	?–?	Arsenal Reserves

Lambeth	?–?	Arsenal Reserves

Drayton Wanderers	?–?	Arsenal Reserves

== See also ==
- List of Arsenal W.F.C. seasons
- 1994–95 in English football
