= 2003–04 in English football =

Football in England
- Season: 2003–04

Men's football
- FA Premier League: Arsenal
- First Division: Norwich City
- Second Division: Plymouth Argyle
- Third Division: Doncaster Rovers
- Football Conference: Chester City
- FA Cup: Manchester United
- Football League Trophy: Blackpool
- League Cup: Middlesbrough
- Community Shield: Manchester United

Women's football
- Premier League National Division: Arsenal
- Premier League Northern Division: Liverpool
- Premier League Southern Division: Bristol City
- FA Women's Cup: Arsenal
- Premier League Cup: Charlton Athletic

The 2003–04 season was the 124th season of association football in England. Arsenal completed the season without losing a league match, becoming Premier League champions in the process. Leeds United avoided going into administration, but were unable to avoid relegation and lost their place in the Premier League - along with Leicester City and Wolverhampton Wanderers.

Norwich City won promotion to the Premier League as Champions after nine years in Division 1. They were joined by runners-up West Bromwich Albion and Crystal Palace, who beat West Ham United in the play-off final. Wimbledon completed their relocation to Milton Keynes and moved into the former England National Hockey Stadium, which would be used as a temporary home until a new stadium was built at Denbigh North. At the end of the season, following the Dons' relegation, club directors changed its name to Milton Keynes Dons. Bradford City and Walsall joined them in relegation to Football League One.

Plymouth Argyle were Division Two champions and ensured that they would be playing in the second tier of English football for the first time in 12 years. Queens Park Rangers joined them together with Brighton & Hove Albion who won the play-off. At the bottom, Rushden & Diamonds were relegated to Division Three along with Grimsby Town, who suffered a second consecutive relegation after losing the last game of the season. Notts County and Wycombe Wanderers were also relegated. In the same division, Oldham Athletic were in financial difficulties but they avoided going into administration after a takeover bid was confirmed.

Doncaster Rovers became Division Three champions to earn their second successive promotion, having been Conference play-off winners the previous season. They had not played above the league's lowest tier for nearly 20 years; they were joined by Hull City, Torquay United and play-off winners Huddersfield Town.

Carlisle United were relegated to the Conference from Division Three. They had spent all but two of the previous 17 seasons in the league's fourth tier. York City followed them out of the Football League after a poor second half of the season. Chester City and Shrewsbury Town were promoted to the Football League from the Football Conference.

Telford United, who had been members of the Conference for every season since its formation in 1979, went out of business at the end of a season in which they had reached the Fourth Round of the FA Cup. The club was quickly reformed as A.F.C. Telford United and joined the Northern Premier League.

== Diary of the season ==
- 26 June 2003: Marc-Vivien Foé, who scored 9 goals in 35 games on loan at Manchester City—and had previously had a spell with West Ham United between 1999 and 2000—collapsed and died during a FIFA Confederations Cup tie for Cameroon.
- 1 July 2003: Liverpool signed defender Steve Finnan from Fulham for £3.6 million.
- 2 July 2003: David Beckham completed his £25 million move from Manchester United to Real Madrid.
- 3 July 2003: Birmingham City paid a club record £5.5 million for Blackburn Rovers midfielder David Dunn.
- 9 July 2003: Liverpool signed Leeds United's Harry Kewell for £5 million.
- 15 July 2003: Manchester United signed American goalkeeper Tim Howard from MetroStars for £2.3 million; Chelsea paid £6 million for 19-year-old West Ham defender Glen Johnson.
- 16 July 2003: Chelsea signed Cameroon midfielder Geremi from Real Madrid for £7 million.
- 21 July 2003: Chelsea signed Southampton defender Wayne Bridge for £7 million and Blackburn winger Damien Duff for a club record £17 million.
- 30 July 2003: The Premier League was officially declared the richest football league in Europe.
- 4 August 2003: The Premier League ruled out the possibility of Rangers and Celtic gaining membership.
- 6 August 2003: Chelsea signed Juan Sebastián Verón from Manchester United for £15 million and Joe Cole from West Ham for £6.6 million.
- 12 August 2003: Manchester United signed 18-year-old Portuguese winger Cristiano Ronaldo for £12.24 million from Sporting CP and Brazil's World Cup-winning midfielder Kléberson for £5.93 million from Atlético Paranaense.
- 14 August 2003: Chelsea signed Romanian striker Adrian Mutu from Parma for £15.8million.
- 25 August 2003: Chelsea signed Russian midfielder Alexei Smertin from Bordeaux for £3.45 million and immediately loaned him to Portsmouth for the season.
- 26 August 2003: Chelsea signed Argentine striker Hernán Crespo from Inter Milan for £16.8 million.
- 29 August 2003: Blackburn paid £7.5 million for Rangers and Scotland midfielder Barry Ferguson.
- 31 August 2003: The first month of the season ended with Arsenal and Manchester United at the top of the league with three wins from their first three Premier League games, while their nearest challengers were Portsmouth (newly promoted), Manchester City and Chelsea. Meanwhile, Wolverhampton Wanderers lost the first three games of their first top flight campaign for 20 years; Bolton Wanderers and Middlesbrough completed the bottom three. The race to get into the Premier League was headed by West Bromwich Albion, who were a point ahead of their nearest rivals Reading and Sheffield United at the top of Division One. Wigan Athletic, Crystal Palace and West Ham completed the top six.
- 1 September 2003: Chelsea signed Real Madrid and France midfielder Claude Makélélé for £16.6 million.
- 21 September 2003: Tottenham Hotspur sacked Glenn Hoddle after two-and-a-half years as manager. Director of football David Pleat took temporary charge.
- 27 September 2003: Wimbledon relocated to Milton Keynes where they would play at the National Hockey Stadium, but this was a temporary measure; there were plans to build a new 25,000-seat stadium at Denbigh North which was expected to be completed in either 2006 or 2007.
- 30 September 2003: Arsenal led the Premier League, but their nearest challengers Chelsea and Manchester United were just a point behind. Surprise title contenders Birmingham City and Southampton completed the top five, but there was widespread doubt as to whether they could continue their good form and make a serious challenge to record their first-ever top division title. Wolverhampton Wanderers were still bottom and looking for their first win of the season; Newcastle United and Tottenham Hotspur completed the bottom three. Sheffield United led the way in Division One, a point ahead of former leaders West Brom. Wigan Athletic, Norwich City, Sunderland and West Ham occupied the play-off zone.
- 31 October 2003: Chelsea were ahead of Arsenal at the top of the Premier League with equal goal difference but with more goals scored; Manchester United were a point behind in third place. Birmingham remained fourth, while Fulham moved into the top five at the expense of Southampton. Leicester City and Middlesbrough propped up the Premier League after an upturn in fortunes for Wolves and Tottenham; Leeds had slipped into the relegation zone as the mass sale of players to help pay off mounting debts took its toll on the field. Newcastle were in eighth place, just below Manchester City. West Brom were top of Division One, where Wigan were playing for the first time in their history. Norwich, Sheffield United, Sunderland and West Ham completed the top six. Ipswich Town were a single goal short of the play-off places.
- 8 November 2003: Senior executives from the 20 Premier League clubs backed plans for clubs to be deducted ten points if they enter receivership.
- 10 November 2003: Peter Reid was sacked after eight months as manager of Leeds United, who were bottom of the Premier League after losing 8 of their opening 12 games. Long-serving coach and former manager Eddie Gray took over on a temporary basis.
- 30 November 2003: Chelsea lead the Premier League, one point ahead of Arsenal and four points ahead of Manchester United. Debt-ridden Leeds propped up the top flight, joined in the relegation zone by Wolves and Everton. West Brom and Norwich were top of Division One, followed by Sheffield United, Ipswich, Wigan and Reading.
- 19 December 2003: Rio Ferdinand received an eight-month ban from football and a £50,000 fine as penalty for missing a drugs test on 22 September. The ban commenced on 19 January, though Ferdinand was intent on appealing against it.
- 31 December 2003: Manchester United were leaders of the Premier League; their nearest contenders Arsenal (unbeaten) and Chelsea were four points behind. Charlton Athletic and Fulham completed the top five, with Liverpool and Newcastle close behind. Wolves and Leeds were bottom of the division; Everton were comfortably clear of the bottom three. Norwich held a six-point lead over West Brom at the top of Division One followed by Sheffield United, Sunderland, Ipswich and Wigan.
- 9 January 2004: Gordon Strachan announced that he would not renew his contract as Southampton manager when it expired at the end of the season, amid speculation that he will return to his old club Leeds as their new manager.
- 14 January 2004: Manchester City signed goalkeeper David James from West Ham for £2 million, prompting the retirement of 40-year-old David Seaman.
- 23 January 2004: Manchester United signed Fulham striker Louis Saha for £12.8 million.
- 28 January 2004: Arsenal signed Sevilla striker José Antonio Reyes for £10.5 million.
- 30 January 2004: Chelsea signed Charlton midfielder Scott Parker for £10 million.
- 31 January 2004: Manchester United topped the Premier League, with unbeaten Arsenal a point behind and a game in hand. Chelsea's bid for the title took a setback; they were in third place with a seven-point gap between them and the top spot followed by Charlton and Liverpool. Leeds, Wolves and Leicester occupied the bottom three places. Norwich and West Brom were still leading the way at the top of Division One. Sheffield United, Sunderland, Ipswich and Wigan occupied the play-off zone.
- 2 February 2004: Tottenham paid £7 million for West Ham striker Jermain Defoe.
- 29 February 2004: Middlesbrough won their first ever trophy as a professional club by beating Bolton Wanderers in the League Cup final. In the Premier League, Arsenal were still unbeaten and were top of the league with a nine-point advantage over Chelsea and Manchester United. Newcastle and Charlton completed the top five, followed closely by Liverpool and Aston Villa. Leeds and Leicester remained in the bottom three, but Wolves had climbed out of the drop zone at the expense of Portsmouth. Norwich and West Brom remained at the top of Division One, and West Ham edged Sheffield United out of an otherwise unchanged play-off zone.
- 2 March 2004: Gordon Strachan, who was due to depart as Southampton manager at the end of the season, resigned from the club with immediate effect.
- 4 March 2004: Paul Sturrock departed from Division Two leaders Plymouth Argyle to become Southampton's new manager.
- 5 March 2004: Three Leicester City players – Paul Dickov, Keith Gillespie and Frank Sinclair – were charged with sexual assault while on a training camp in La Manga, Spain.
- 7 March 2004: A brace from Malky Mackay followed up by a goal from Darren Huckerby secured East Anglian derby victory for Norwich over Ipswich.
- 31 March 2004: Arsenal, the first team to complete 30 matches unbeaten at the start of a league season, led Chelsea by seven points with Manchester United a further five points behind. They were also in contention for both the Champions League and the FA Cup. Liverpool and Newcastle completed the top five as Charlton's bid for a European place was fading fast, the competition now coming from Birmingham and Aston Villa. At the other end of the table, time was running out for Wolves and Leeds; Leicester were still giving the rest of the bottom ten a good run for their money. Norwich and West Brom were equal on points at the top of Division One, and Millwall had edged Wigan out of the top six.
- 10 April 2004: Arsenal's double hopes ended when they lost 1–0 to Manchester United in the FA Cup semi-final at Villa Park.
- 25 April 2004: Arsenal clinched the Premier League title – and were still unbeaten – after a 2–2 draw with Tottenham at White Hart Lane. Norwich and West Brom had their promotion from Division One confirmed. The play-off places were still being contested between seven clubs: Sunderland, Ipswich, West Ham, Wigan, Sheffield United, Reading and Crystal Palace, who had climbed from 19th to 7th since the appointment of Iain Dowie as manager four months previously.
- 30 April 2004: Arsenal finished April as Premier League champions while Chelsea and Manchester United fought closely for second place. Liverpool and Aston Villa completed the top five, though the seven teams below them still stood a chance of a top-five finish and European qualification. Wolves and Leicester needed a miracle to avoid relegation, and Leeds were still giving most of the rest of the bottom ten a run for their money.
- 1 May 2004: Leicester's relegation from the Premier League was confirmed just one season after promotion; Wolves needed to win both of their remaining games by a significant margin and hope that Manchester City would suffer heavy defeats in both of theirs to survive, despite beating Everton. Leeds still needed at least a draw against Bolton to have any chance of avoiding relegation. At the top of the Premiership, Chelsea looked set for second place while Manchester United seemed certain to settle for third place, with Liverpool and Newcastle completing the top five.
- 2 May 2004: Leeds lost 4–1 to Bolton (despite taking the lead) at the Reebok Stadium, effectively sealing their relegation to the soon-to-be rebranded Football League Championship (exactly three years after contesting a Champions League semi-final), joining Leicester and Wolves.
- 15 May 2004: Arsenal completed the Premier League season unbeaten with a 2–1 win over Leicester, only the third time since the formation of the Football League in 1888 that a team has gone an entire season unbeaten in the league. Joining them in next season's Champions League were Chelsea, Manchester United and Liverpool (occupying second, third and fourth place respectively), while fifth-placed Newcastle qualified for the UEFA Cup with League Cup winners Middlesbrough.
- 16 May 2004: Arsenal signed Dutch winger Robin van Persie from Feyenoord for £2.75 million.
- 17 May 2004: Goalkeeper Paul Robinson left relegated Leeds in a £1.5 million move to Spurs.
- 20 May 2004: Birmingham City paid a club record £6.25 million for Liverpool striker Emile Heskey.
- 22 May 2004: Manchester United beat Millwall 3–0 to clinch the FA Cup for the 11th time in their history. The losers had played their first-ever major cup final; however, Manchester United's participation in the Champions League meant that Millwall would be competing in the UEFA Cup next season, the first time they will have ever played in a European competition.
- 24 May 2004: Gérard Houllier was sacked after six years as manager of Liverpool.
- 27 May 2004: Telford United, who reached the FA Cup fourth round in this season, were liquidated and removed from the Conference as a result. Leeds sold striker Alan Smith to rivals Manchester United for £7 million.
- 29 May 2004: Crystal Palace, who were 19th in Division One when Iain Dowie became manager on 22 December, won promotion to the Premier League with a 1–0 win over West Ham in the play-off final. Neil Shipperley scored the only goal of the game. Ironically, Dowie was a former player of both of these clubs.
- 1 June 2004: Chelsea signed Rennes and Czech Republic goalkeeper Petr Čech for £7 million.
- 2 June 2004: José Mourinho took over as manager of Chelsea, replacing the sacked Claudio Ranieri.
- 11 June 2004: Manchester United signed Argentine defender Gabriel Heinze from Paris Saint-Germain for £6.9 million.
- 13 June 2004: England's UEFA Euro 2004 campaign began with a 2–1 defeat by France.
- 16 June 2004: Rafael Benítez took over as manager of Liverpool.
- 17 June 2004: England confirmed their quarter-final qualification with a 3–0 win over Switzerland at Euro 2004.
- 21 June 2004: Wimbledon announced that they would change their name to Milton Keynes Dons, reflecting its highly controversial move from South London to Milton Keynes. England's Euro 2004 group stage campaign finished with a 4–2 win over Croatia.
- 24 June 2004: England lost on penalties to Euro 2004 hosts Portugal after a 2–2 draw, with penalty misses from David Beckham and Darius Vassell ending their chances of progressing to the semi-finals.

== National team ==
Date	Venue	Opponents	Score	Competition	England scorers
20 August 2003	Portman Road, Ipswich	Croatia	3–1	F	David Beckham (pen), Michael Owen, Frank Lampard
6 September 2003	Skopje City Stadium, Skopje	Macedonia	2–1	ECQ	Wayne Rooney, David Beckham (pen)
10 September 2003	Old Trafford, Manchester	Liechtenstein	2–0	ECQ	Michael Owen, Wayne Rooney
11 October 2003	Şükrü Saracoğlu Stadium, Istanbul	Turkey	0–0	ECQ	
16 November 2003	Old Trafford, Manchester	Denmark	2–3	F	Wayne Rooney, Joe Cole
14 February 2004	Estádio Algarve, Faro	Portugal	1–1	F	Ledley King
31 March 2004	Nya Ullevi Stadion, Gothenburg	Sweden	0–1	F	
1 June 2004	City of Manchester Stadium, Manchester	Japan	1–1	FA	Michael Owen
5 June 2004	City of Manchester Stadium, Manchester	Iceland	6–1	FA	Frank Lampard, Wayne Rooney (2), Darius Vassell (2), Wayne Bridge
13 June 2004	Estádio da Luz, Lisbon	France	1–2	ECF	Frank Lampard
17 June 2004	Estádio Cidade, Coimbra	Switzerland	3–0	ECF	Wayne Rooney (2), Steven Gerrard
21 June 2004	Estádio da Luz, Lisbon	Croatia	4–2	ECF	Paul Scholes, Wayne Rooney (2), Frank Lampard
24 June 2004	Estádio da Luz, Lisbon	Portugal	1–1 (FT), 2–2 (aet), 5–6 (P)	ECF	Michael Owen, Frank Lampard

- ECQ – Euro 2004 qualifiers
- ECF – Euro 2004 finals
- F – Friendly; scores are written England first
- FA – FA Summer Tournament (friendly)
- (FT) – Full-time
- (aet) – After extra time
- (P) – After penalty shoot out

== Honours ==
Competition	Winner
FA Premier League	Arsenal
FA Cup	Manchester United
Carling Cup	Middlesbrough
Football League Trophy	Blackpool
Football League First Division	Norwich City
Football League Second Division	Plymouth Argyle
Football League Third Division	Doncaster Rovers
FA Community Shield	Manchester United

== European qualification ==
Competition	Qualifiers	Reason for qualification
UEFA Champions League	Arsenal	1st in FA Premier League
UEFA Champions League	Chelsea	2nd in FA Premier League
UEFA Champions League Third Qualifying Round	Manchester United	3rd in FA Premier League
UEFA Champions League Third Qualifying Round	Liverpool	4th in FA Premier League
UEFA Cup	Newcastle United	5th in FA Premier League
UEFA Cup	Middlesbrough	League Cup Winners
UEFA Cup	Millwall	In lieu of FA Cup winners (qualification awarded as FA Cup runners-up because FA Cup winners Manchester United had already qualified for the Champions League)

== League tables ==
=== FA Premier League ===
Despite the Premiership title picture being a three-horse race for much of the campaign, Arsenal remained unbeaten all season long and clinched the title with 90 points and an 11-point gap over runners-up Chelsea, who had been most people's favourites for the title after a £100 million summer spending spree. After losing defender Rio Ferdinand to an eight-month ban for missing a drugs test in September, defending champions Manchester United turned in some lacklustre performances during the second half of the season, which put paid to their hopes of retaining their crown and restricting them to a third-place finish, some 15 points behind Arsenal. Solace came in the form of a record 11th FA Cup triumph, defeating Millwall 3–0 in the final at the Millennium Stadium.

Liverpool were the final team to qualify for the Champions League, finishing in fourth place, but leaving them 30 points behind Arsenal and slightly closer to the relegation zone than the title winners, and manager Gérard Houllier was sacked shortly after the season's end.

League Cup winners Middlesbrough qualified for the UEFA Cup for the first time in their history, joined by fifth-placed Newcastle United, who edged out Aston Villa – who had recovered from as low as 18th place in November – on goal difference. Seventh-placed Charlton Athletic and eighth-placed Bolton Wanderers both achieved their highest league finishes since the 1950s, while ninth-placed Fulham (many people's pre-season relegation favourites) defied the odds under 33-year-old manager Chris Coleman and achieved the highest league finish of their history. Birmingham City, in their second season since promotion, also enjoyed a solid year, finishing tenth.

Portsmouth, also considered favourites for relegation pre-season, finished a respectable 13th in their first top-flight season for 16 years, despite finishing behind bitter rivals Southampton, who recovered from the sudden resignation of Gordon Strachan in March to finish 12th.

Newly promoted Leicester City and Wolverhampton Wanderers both went down after just one season (Wolves not gaining one away win all season), while Leeds United's Premiership status was crushed under a multi-million pound debt which had been mounting relentlessly for the best part of three years, as their relegation ultimately became a matter of when rather than if, ending their top-flight membership after 14 successive seasons among the elite.

Pos	Team	Pld	W	D	L	GF	GA	GD	Pts	Qualification or relegation
1	Arsenal (C)	38	26	12	0	73	26	+47	90	Qualification for the Champions League group stage
2	Chelsea	38	24	7	7	67	30	+37	79	Qualification for the Champions League group stage
3	Manchester United	38	23	6	9	64	35	+29	75	Qualification for the Champions League third qualifying round (Note: Since Manchester United qualified for the Champions League, their place in the UEFA Cup as 2003–04 FA Cup winners went to First Division club Millwall, who were the FA Cup runners-up.)
4	Liverpool	38	16	12	10	55	37	+18	60	Qualification for the Champions League third qualifying round
5	Newcastle United	38	13	17	8	52	40	+12	56	Qualification for the UEFA Cup first round
6	Aston Villa	38	15	11	12	48	44	+4	56	
7	Charlton Athletic	38	14	11	13	51	51	0	53	
8	Bolton Wanderers	38	14	11	13	48	56	−8	53	
9	Fulham	38	14	10	14	52	46	+6	52	
10	Birmingham City	38	12	14	12	43	48	−5	50	
11	Middlesbrough	38	13	9	16	44	52	−8	48	Qualification for the UEFA Cup first round (Note: Middlesbrough qualified as the 2003–04 Football League Cup winners.)
12	Southampton	38	12	11	15	44	45	−1	47	
13	Portsmouth	38	12	9	17	47	54	−7	45	
14	Tottenham Hotspur	38	13	6	19	47	57	−10	45	
15	Blackburn Rovers	38	12	8	18	51	59	−8	44	
16	Manchester City	38	9	14	15	55	54	+1	41	
17	Everton	38	9	12	17	45	57	−12	39	
18	Leicester City (R)	38	6	15	17	48	65	−17	33	Relegation to the Football League Championship
19	Leeds United (R)	38	8	9	21	40	79	−39	33	Relegation to the Football League Championship
20	Wolverhampton Wanderers (R)	38	7	12	19	38	77	−39	33	Relegation to the Football League Championship

Source: Premier League
Rules for classification: 1) points; 2) goal difference; 3) number of goals scored.
(C) Champions; (R) Relegated
Notes:

Leading goalscorer: Thierry Henry (Arsenal) – 30

=== Football League First Division ===
The top three led the division for most of the season, but Sunderland could not shake off their poor start and lost out to Norwich, who returned to the Premiership after nearly a decade, and West Brom, who bounced back to the Premiership after relegation the previous season. Crystal Palace achieved one of the most unlikely promotions of recent times, spending the entire first half of the season in the relegation zone under manager Steve Kember before surging into the play-off places under new manager Iain Dowie.

West Ham continued to sell most of their top players following relegation the previous season, but overcame the sudden sacking of Glenn Roeder only three games into the season as his replacement Alan Pardew guided them to 4th place, with the loss to Crystal Palace in the playoff final the only disappointment. Wigan's first season in the First Division saw them finish two points off the play-off places in seventh, failing to win any of their last 4 games, although they did finish above last season's playoff finalists Sheffield United on goal difference.

Wimbledon's move to Milton Keynes took its toll on the club, and they finished bottom of the table in an abysmal final season for the club before it was renamed as MK Dons. Bradford fared little better, despite the presence of former England captain Bryan Robson in the manager's chair. Walsall made a respectable start to the season before slumping somewhat later on, and finally crashing into the relegation zone; just a single point from any of their last three games would have ensured survival.

Millwall qualified for the UEFA Cup for finishing as runners-up in the FA Cup, as winners Manchester United already qualified for the Champions League.

Pos	Team	Pld	W	D	L	GF	GA	GD	Pts	Promotion, qualification or relegation
1	Norwich City (C, P)	46	28	10	8	79	39	+40	94	Promotion to the FA Premier League
2	West Bromwich Albion (P)	46	25	11	10	64	42	+22	86	Promotion to the FA Premier League
3	Sunderland	46	22	13	11	62	45	+17	79	Qualification for the First Division play-offs
4	West Ham United	46	19	17	10	67	45	+22	74	Qualification for the First Division play-offs
5	Ipswich Town	46	21	10	15	84	72	+12	73	Qualification for the First Division play-offs
6	Crystal Palace (O, P)	46	21	10	15	72	61	+11	73	Qualification for the First Division play-offs
7	Wigan Athletic	46	18	17	11	60	45	+15	71	
8	Sheffield United	46	20	11	15	65	56	+9	71	
9	Reading	46	20	10	16	55	57	−2	70	
10	Millwall	46	18	15	13	55	48	+7	69	Qualification for the UEFA Cup first round (Note: Since the FA Cup winners Manchester United qualified for the Champions League, their place in the UEFA Cup went to Millwall, who were the FA Cup runners-up.)
11	Stoke City	46	18	12	16	58	55	+3	66	
12	Coventry City	46	17	14	15	67	54	+13	65	
13	Cardiff City	46	17	14	15	68	58	+10	65	
14	Nottingham Forest	46	15	15	16	61	58	+3	60	
15	Preston North End	46	15	14	17	69	71	−2	59	
16	Watford	46	15	12	19	54	68	−14	57	
17	Rotherham United	46	13	15	18	53	61	−8	54	
18	Crewe Alexandra	46	14	11	21	57	66	−9	53	
19	Burnley	46	13	14	19	60	77	−17	53	
20	Derby County	46	13	13	20	53	67	−14	52	
21	Gillingham	46	14	9	23	48	67	−19	51	
22	Walsall (R)	46	13	12	21	45	65	−20	51	Relegation to Football League One
23	Bradford City (R)	46	10	6	30	38	69	−31	36	Relegation to Football League One
24	Wimbledon (R)	46	8	5	33	41	89	−48	29	Renamed Milton Keynes Dons in Football League One

Source: Soccerway
Rules for classification: 1) points; 2) goal difference; 3) number of goals scored.
(C) Champions; (O) Play-off winners; (P) Promoted; (R) Relegated
Notes:

Leading goalscorer: Andrew Johnson (Crystal Palace) – 27

=== Football League Second Division ===
Plymouth Argyle finished top of the division, though they lost manager Paul Sturrock to Southampton. Queens Park Rangers grabbed the second spot from under the noses of Bristol City, who proceeded to lose the play-off final to Brighton & Hove Albion, another side who bounced back from relegation the previous season.

Tony Adams, previously suggested by many as a possible future manager of Arsenal and England, failed to keep Wycombe Wanderers up, ending their ten-year spell in the division. Notts County nearly went bankrupt during the course of the season and the effect on the club was evident, as they slipped into Division Three (or League Two, as it would be called the next season). Rushden & Diamonds' years of success came to a grinding halt as they suffered their first-ever relegation and crashed out of the division after being promoted the previous year. Grimsby Town filled the final relegation spot, resulting in their second consecutive relegation; they had looked safe in the final weeks, but ultimately went down after a poor sequence of results combined with revivals by Chesterfield and Stockport County.

Pos	Team	Pld	W	D	L	GF	GA	GD	Pts	Promotion or relegation
1	Plymouth Argyle (C, P)	46	26	12	8	85	41	+44	90	Promotion to Football League Championship
2	Queens Park Rangers (P)	46	22	17	7	80	45	+35	83	Promotion to Football League Championship
3	Bristol City	46	23	13	10	58	37	+21	82	Qualification for the Second Division play-offs
4	Brighton & Hove Albion (O, P)	46	22	11	13	64	43	+21	77	Qualification for the Second Division play-offs
5	Swindon Town	46	20	13	13	76	58	+18	73	Qualification for the Second Division play-offs
6	Hartlepool United	46	20	13	13	76	61	+15	73	Qualification for the Second Division play-offs
7	Port Vale	46	21	10	15	73	63	+10	73	
8	Tranmere Rovers	46	17	16	13	59	56	+3	67	
9	Bournemouth	46	17	15	14	56	51	+5	66	
10	Luton Town	46	17	15	14	69	66	+3	66	
11	Colchester United	46	17	13	16	52	56	−4	64	
12	Barnsley	46	15	17	14	54	58	−4	62	
13	Wrexham	46	17	9	20	50	60	−10	60	
14	Blackpool	46	16	11	19	58	65	−7	59	
15	Oldham Athletic	46	12	21	13	66	60	+6	57	
16	Sheffield Wednesday	46	13	14	19	48	64	−16	53	
17	Brentford	46	14	11	21	52	69	−17	53	
18	Peterborough United	46	12	16	18	58	58	0	52	
19	Stockport County	46	11	19	16	62	70	−8	52	
20	Chesterfield	46	12	15	19	49	71	−22	51	
21	Grimsby Town (R)	46	13	11	22	55	81	−26	50	Relegation to Football League Two
22	Rushden & Diamonds (R)	46	13	9	24	60	74	−14	48	Relegation to Football League Two
23	Notts County (R)	46	10	12	24	50	78	−28	42	Relegation to Football League Two
24	Wycombe Wanderers (R)	46	6	19	21	50	75	−25	37	Relegation to Football League Two

Rules for classification: In the Football League goals scored (GF) takes precedence over goal difference (GD).
(C) Champions; (O) Play-off winners; (P) Promoted; (R) Relegated

Leading goalscorer: Leon Knight (Brighton & Hove Albion) and Stephen McPhee (Port Vale) – 25

=== Football League Third Division ===
Doncaster Rovers earned a second successive promotion, showing that the club was firmly back on track after the years of struggle and scandal that the club had endured in the late 1990s. Hull City were another team who had suffered much strife in the previous decade, but this time their extensive investment in players finally paid off, and they were promoted as runners-up. Torquay United earned the third automatic promotion spot from Huddersfield on the last day of the season. Huddersfield Town would make up for this by beating Mansfield in the play-off final, earning an immediate return after the previous year's relegation.

Despite winning 4 out of their last 5 games, Yeovil missed out on the playoffs on goal difference in their first ever season in the Football League, while Swansea, nearly relegated the previous season, finished 10th, but were still closer to the drop zone than the playoffs.

York City were in play-off contention for a large part of the campaign, but a disastrous end to the season saw them lose 16 of their last 20 games, costing them their 80-year-old League status. Conversely, Carlisle United started the season horrendously, but a late run saw them finish 23rd. A few years ago this would have seen them complete an amazing escape from relegation, but with the introduction of two relegation places from the League it was no longer sufficient, and they dropped into the Conference, becoming the first former top-flight team to suffer this indignity.

Pos	Team	Pld	W	D	L	GF	GA	GD	Pts	Promotion or relegation
1	Doncaster Rovers (C, P)	46	27	11	8	79	37	+42	92	Promotion to Football League One
2	Hull City (P)	46	25	13	8	82	44	+38	88	Promotion to Football League One
3	Torquay United (P)	46	23	12	11	68	44	+24	81	Promotion to Football League One
4	Huddersfield Town (O, P)	46	23	12	11	68	52	+16	81	Qualification for the Third Division play-offs
5	Mansfield Town	46	22	9	15	76	62	+14	75	Qualification for the Third Division play-offs
6	Northampton Town	46	22	9	15	58	51	+7	75	Qualification for the Third Division play-offs
7	Lincoln City	46	19	17	10	68	47	+21	74	Qualification for the Third Division play-offs
8	Yeovil Town	46	23	5	18	70	57	+13	74	
9	Oxford United	46	18	17	11	55	44	+11	71	
10	Swansea City	46	15	14	17	58	61	−3	59	
11	Boston United	46	16	11	19	50	54	−4	59	
12	Bury	46	15	11	20	54	64	−10	56	
13	Cambridge United	46	14	14	18	55	67	−12	56	
14	Cheltenham Town	46	14	14	18	57	71	−14	56	
15	Bristol Rovers	46	14	13	19	50	61	−11	55	
16	Kidderminster Harriers	46	14	13	19	45	59	−14	55	
17	Southend United	46	14	12	20	51	63	−12	54	
18	Darlington	46	14	11	21	53	61	−8	53	
19	Leyton Orient	46	13	14	19	48	65	−17	53	
20	Macclesfield Town	46	13	13	20	54	69	−15	52	
21	Rochdale	46	12	14	20	49	58	−9	50	
22	Scunthorpe United	46	11	16	19	69	72	−3	49	
23	Carlisle United (R)	46	12	9	25	46	69	−23	45	Relegation to Football Conference
24	York City (R)	46	10	14	22	35	66	−31	44	Relegation to Football Conference

Rules for classification: In the Football League goals scored (GF) takes precedence over goal difference (GD).
(C) Champions; (O) Play-off winners; (P) Promoted; (R) Relegated

Leading goalscorer: Steve MacLean (Scunthorpe United) – 23

== National league system ==
=== Cup competitions ===
Competition	Winners
FA Trophy	Hednesford Town
FA Vase	Winchester City
FA National League System Cup	Mid Cheshire League

=== Football Conference ===
- Champions:
  - Chester City
- Playoff winners:
  - Shrewsbury Town
- Relegated:
  - Margate (forced relegation to Conference South due to failing ground requirements)

=== Northern Premier League ===
- Champions:
  - Hucknall Town (to Conference North)
- Also promoted (to Conference North):
  - Droylsden, Barrow, Alfreton Town, Harrogate Town, Southport, Worksop Town, Lancaster City, Vauxhall Motors, Gainsborough Trinity, Stalybridge Celtic, Altrincham, Runcorn FC Halton, Bradford Park Avenue (playoff winners)

=== Southern League ===
- Champions:
  - Crawley Town (to Conference National)
- Also promoted (to Conference North):
  - Stafford Rangers, Nuneaton Borough, Worcester City, Hinckley United, Moor Green
- Also promoted (to Conference South):
  - Weymouth, Newport County, Cambridge City, Welling United, Weston-super-Mare, Eastbourne Borough, Havant & Waterlooville, Dorchester Town (playoff winners)

=== Isthmian League ===
- Champions:
  - Canvey Island (to Conference National)
- Also promoted (to Conference South):
  - Sutton United, Thurrock, Hornchurch, Grays Athletic, Carshalton Athletic, Hayes, Bognor Regis Town, Bishop's Stortford, Maidenhead United, Ford United, Basingstoke Town, St Albans City (playoff winners)
- Also promoted (to Conference North):
  - Kettering Town

=== Other leagues ===
	League	Champions	Notes
Step 3 Leagues	Northern Premier League First Division	Hyde United	
Step 3 Leagues	Southern League Midland/West Division	Redditch United	(promoted to Conference North after playoffs)
Step 3 Leagues	Southern League South/East Division	King's Lynn	
Step 3 Leagues	Isthmian League Division One North	Yeading	
Step 3 Leagues	Isthmian League Division One South	Lewes	(promoted to Conference South after playoffs)
Step 4 Leagues	Northern League	Dunston Federation Brewery	
Step 4 Leagues	North West Counties League	Clitheroe	
Step 4 Leagues	Northern Counties East League	Ossett Albion	
Step 4 Leagues	Midland Alliance	Rocester	
Step 4 Leagues	United Counties League	Spalding United	
Step 4 Leagues	Eastern Counties League	A.F.C. Sudbury	
Step 4 Leagues	Isthmian League Division Two	Leighton Town	
Step 4 Leagues	Essex Senior League	Concord Rangers	
Step 4 Leagues	Spartan South Midlands League	Beaconsfield SYCOB	
Step 4 Leagues	Combined Counties League	AFC Wimbledon	
Step 4 Leagues	Hellenic League	Brackley Town	
Step 4 Leagues	Western League	Bideford	
Step 4 Leagues	Wessex League	Winchester City	
Step 4 Leagues	Sussex County League	Chichester City United	
Step 4 Leagues	Kent League	Cray Wanderers	

== Women's football ==
=== Women's Premier League ===
==== National Division ====
Pos	Team	Pld	W	D	L	GF	GA	GD	Pts	Qualification or relegation
1	Arsenal (C)	18	15	2	1	65	11	+54	47	Qualification for the UEFA Cup qualifying round
2	Charlton Athletic	18	15	1	2	52	17	+35	46	
3	Fulham	18	14	2	2	60	20	+40	44	
4	Leeds United	18	8	4	6	32	28	+4	28	
5	Doncaster Rovers Belles	18	8	3	7	41	40	+1	27	
6	Everton	18	6	2	10	21	36	−15	20	
7	Birmingham City	18	4	5	9	17	31	−14	17	
8	Bristol Rovers	18	3	3	12	27	37	−10	12	
9	Aston Villa (R)	18	1	4	13	18	63	−45	7	Relegation to Northern Division
10	Tranmere Rovers (R)	18	1	4	13	13	63	−50	7	Relegation to Northern Division

Source: FA WPL
(C) Champions; (R) Relegated

==== Northern Division ====
Pos	Team	Pld	W	D	L	GF	GA	GD	Pts	Promotion or relegation
1	Liverpool (C, P)	20	15	5	0	51	12	+39	50	Promotion to the National Division
2	Sunderland	20	10	7	3	56	31	+25	37	
3	Stockport County	20	10	4	6	41	22	+19	34	
4	Oldham Curzon	20	9	7	4	39	21	+18	34	
5	Wolverhampton Wanderers	20	6	9	5	27	22	+5	27	
6	Middlesbrough	20	7	5	8	25	28	−3	26	
7	Manchester City	20	7	3	10	35	45	−10	24	
8	Lincoln	20	6	5	9	34	38	−4	23	
9	Sheffield Wednesday	20	6	4	10	30	45	−15	22	
10	Chesterfield (R)	20	5	6	9	23	50	−27	21	Relegation to the Midland Combination League
11	Bangor City (R)	20	0	3	17	12	59	−47	3	Relegation to the Northern Combination League

Source: FA WPL
(C) Champions; (P) Promoted; (R) Relegated

==== Southern Division ====
Pos	Team	Pld	W	D	L	GF	GA	GD	Pts	Promotion or relegation
1	Bristol City (C, P)	24	18	4	2	78	31	+47	58	Promotion to the National Division
2	Southampton Saints	24	18	3	3	54	18	+36	57	
3	AFC Wimbledon	24	17	2	5	57	38	+19	53	
4	Chelsea	24	13	6	5	60	38	+22	45	
5	Watford	24	9	5	10	34	38	−4	32	
6	Brighton & Hove Albion	24	8	7	9	43	44	−1	31	
7	Langford	24	9	4	11	37	42	−5	31	
8	Millwall Lionesses	24	8	6	10	35	38	−3	30	
9	Ipswich Town	24	8	5	11	39	44	−5	29	
10	Portsmouth	24	9	1	14	43	48	−5	28	
11	Enfield Town	24	4	4	16	17	54	−37	16	
12	Merthyr Tydfil (R)	24	3	6	15	27	61	−34	15	Relegation to the South West Combination League
13	Barnet (R)	24	2	7	15	31	61	−30	11 (Note: Barnet 2 points deducted for using ineligible player.)	Relegation to the South East Combination League

Source: FA WPL
(C) Champions; (P) Promoted; (R) Relegated

=== FA Women's Cup ===
==== Final ====
3 May 2004
13:00 BST

Arsenal	3–0	Charlton Athletic
Fleeting 23', 25', 83'	Report

Loftus Road, London
Attendance: 12,244
Referee: Amy Rayner

== Transfer deals ==
=== Summer transfer window ===
The summer transfer window ran from the end of the previous season until 31 August 2003.

=== January transfer window ===
The mid-season transfer window runs from 1 to 31 January 2004.

For subsequent transfer deals see 2004–05 in English football.

== Famous debutants ==
- Anton Ferdinand – 18-year-old defender, made his debut for West Ham in their 2–1 away win over Preston North End on 9 August 2003.
- Darren Fletcher – 19-year-old midfielder, made his debut for Manchester United in their 4–1 win over Leicester City at Walkers Stadium on 27 September 2003.
- Ashley Young – 18-year-old winger, made his debut for Watford in their 3–1 home win over Millwall on 13 September 2003.
- Aaron Lennon – 16-year-old winger, made his debut for Leeds United in their 2–2 home draw with Newcastle on 17 August 2003.
- Cristiano Ronaldo – 18-year-old Ronaldo made his debut as a substitute in a 4–0 home win over Bolton Wanderers in the Premier League on 16 August 2003, and received a standing ovation when he came on for Nicky Butt. His performance earned praise from George Best, who hailed it as "undoubtedly the most exciting debut" he had ever seen.
- Scott Carson – 18-year-old goalkeeper made his debut as a substitute for Leeds United in a 3-0 defeat to Middlesbrough on 31 January 2004, replacing Paul Robinson who was sent off.

== Retirements ==
- 13 January 2004: David Seaman, 40, retired from playing halfway through a one-year contract at Manchester City, having joined them seven months ago after 13 years at Arsenal. He was England's regular goalkeeper for a decade.
- 15 May 2004: Denis Irwin, 38, retired from playing following a two-year spell at Wolverhampton Wanderers after joining them from Manchester United where he spent 12 years. A regular for the Republic of Ireland in the 1990s, he also had spells playing for Leeds United and Oldham Athletic.

== Deaths ==
- 6 July 2003: Bert Hoyle, 83, kept goal in 82 league games for Exeter City and 105 for Bristol Rovers in the seven seasons following the end of World War II before his senior career was ended by injuries sustained in a car crash.
- 9 August 2003:
  - – Jimmy Davis, 21, Manchester United and England under-21 striker, died in a car crash on the M40 just hours before the club to whom he had been loaned – Watford – were due to play. He had played once for Manchester United in a League Cup game, and had spent part of the 2001–02 season on loan to Swindon Town.
  - – Ray Harford, 58, was best remembered for his managerial and coaching career – he was manager of Luton Town when they won the League Cup in 1988 and assistant manager of Blackburn Rovers when they were Premiership champions in 1995. He was promoted from the role of assistant manager to the manager's seat at three clubs – Luton Town, Wimbledon and Blackburn Rovers. He also had spells in charge of Fulham, West Bromwich Albion and finally Queens Park Rangers. His last post was as first-team coach at Millwall, and helped them win the Division Two title in 2001. He was still on the club's payroll at the time of his death from lung cancer.
- 4 September 2003: Harold Atkinson, 78, scored 91 league goals as a centre-forward for Tranmere Rovers in the nine seasons following the end of World War II before finishing his senior career with a spell at Chesterfield.
- 26 October 2003: Steve Death, 54, made one appearance in goal for West Ham under Ron Greenwood before signing for Reading in 1969 and remaining with them until his retirement 13 years later, playing 471 league games. He was the club's player of the year four times, won promotion from the Fourth Division twice, kept 26 clean sheets in a single season and went a record 1,103 minutes of league football without conceding a goal.
- 28 November 2003: Ted Bates, 85, served Southampton for 66 years until his death as a player, coach, manager, director and president. He scored 63 goals for the club as a forward and during his 18-year spell as manager took the club into the top flight for the first time in 1966.
- 1 February 2004: Bob Stokoe, 73, was manager of the Sunderland side who achieved a shock FA Cup victory over Leeds United in the 1973 final. He later managed Carlisle United and returned to Sunderland during the 1986–87 season, but quit after failing to save them from relegation to the old Third Division for the first time in their history.
- 14 February 2004: Steve Cooper, 39, former striker who played nine Football League clubs during his career, most notably Tranmere Rovers and Plymouth Argyle, where he was a key member of promotion-winning sides. Later joined Scottish side Airdrie where he was a member of the side that surprisingly reached the Scottish FA Cup final in 1995.
- 21 February 2004: John Charles, 72, was the most famous Leeds United player in the pre-Don Revie era. His exploits for Leeds and the Welsh national team attracted attention from all over the world and he was sold to Italian side Juventus in 1958.
- 19 March 2004: Bert Barlow, 87, scored in Portsmouth 1939 FA Cup triumph over Wolverhampton Wanderers, a year after he joined the Fratton Park club from their Wembley opponents. He was still at the club a decade later when they won the league title. Having started his career at Barnsley, he later played for Leicester before winding up at Colchester United in 1954.
- 21 June 2004: Ron Ashman, 78, was a full-back for most of his 592 league appearances for Norwich City between 1947 and 1963, during which time they reached the FA Cup semi-finals in 1959 and won the League Cup in 1962. He became manager soon after the club's League Cup triumph and remained in charge until 1966. In the first of two spells as manager of Scunthorpe United, he sold Kevin Keegan to Liverpool.
