= Maria Harper =

English footballer (born 1963)

Personal information
- Date of birth: 2 February 1963 (age 63)
- Position: Forward

Senior career*
Years	Team	Apps	(Gls)
1984–1991	Leasowe Pacific		
1991–1997	Liverpool		

International career
1989–1996	England	14	(2)
- * Club domestic league appearances and goals

Maria Harper (born 2 February 1963) is a former England women's international footballer. She played in five FA Women's Cup finals, winning once in 1989.

== Club career ==
Harper's greatest achievement is winning the 1989 WFA Cup Final with Leasowe Pacific when they defeated Friends of Fulham 3-2 at Old Trafford. Harper was named player of the match. Leasowe had lost the final in the previous year. She moved to Knowsley United and was part of the side that lost the 1994 final to Doncaster Belles. Further defeats in finals followed in both 1995 and 1996 at the renamed Liverpool against Arsenal and Croydon respectively.

== International career ==
In November 2022, Harper was recognized by The Football Association as one of the England national team's legacy players, and as the 76th women's player to be capped by England.

== Honours ==
Leasowe Pacific

- FA Women's Cup: 1988–89; runner-up: 1987–88

Liverpool

- FA Women's Cup: runner-up: 1994–95, 1995–96,
