= 1995 FA Women's Cup final =

1995 FA Women's Cup Final
- The match programme cover
- Event: 1994–95 FA Women's Cup
Liverpool	Arsenal
2	3
- Date: 30 April 1995
- Venue: Prenton Park, Birkenhead
- Player of the Match: Karen Burke (Liverpool)
- Referee: Jeff Winter (North Riding)
- Attendance: 3,000

The 1995 FA Women's Cup Final was the 26th final of the FA Women's Cup, England's primary cup competition for women's football teams. It was the 26th final to be held under the direct control of the Football Association (FA). The final was contested between Liverpool and Arsenal on 30 April 1995 at Prenton Park, the home stadium of Tranmere Rovers. Arsenal defeated Liverpool 3–2.

== Match details ==
30 April 1995
13:15 BST

Liverpool	2–3	Arsenal
Burke 24', 41'	Report	Lonergan 36', 55'; Spacey 81'

Prenton Park, Birkenhead
Attendance: 3,000
Referee: Jeff Winter

Liverpool	Arsenal

GK	1	(England) Tracey Davidson
CB	2	(England) Clare Taylor (c)
CB	4	(England) Louise Ryde
CB	3	(England) Jill Thomas	(substituted off) 57'
RM	8	(England) Paula Oldham
CM	6	(England) Angie Gallimore
CM	5	(England) Becky Easton
AM	7	(England) Karen Burke
LM	9	(England) Jan Murray
FW	10	(England) Maria Harper
FW	11	(England) Julie Hewitt	(substituted off) 79'
Substitutes:
GK	15	(England) Dianne Coughlin
DF	16	(England) Gayle Formston
MF	14	(England) Joy McQuiggan	(substituted on) 79'
MF	17	(England) Sammy Howarth
FW	12	(England) Julie Griffiths	(substituted on) 57'
Player/Manager:
(England) Angie Gallimore

GK	1	(England) Pauline Cope
RB	2	(England) Kirsty Pealling
CB	5	(Northern Ireland) Gill Wylie (c)
SW	4	(England) Vicki Slee
CB	6	(England) Lisa Spry
LB	3	(England) Michelle Curley	(substituted off) 83'
CM	11	(England) Jo Churchman	(substituted off) 89'
AM	9	(England) Marieanne Spacey
CM	7	(England) Sian Williams
FW	10	(England) Becky Lonergan
FW	8	(England) Sammy Britton
Substitutes:
GK	13	(England) Kathy Simmons
DF	12	(England) Kelley Few	(substituted on) 83'
MF	15	(England) Emma Coss
FW	16	(England) Kelly Townshend
FW	14	(Wales) Naz Ball	(substituted on) 89'
Manager:
(England) Vic Akers

Player of the match
Karen Burke (Liverpool)

Assistant referees:
K. J. Hawkes
S. Race

Match rules

- 90 minutes.
- 30 minutes of extra-time if necessary.
- Penalty shoot-out if scores still level.
- Five named substitutes.
- Maximum of two substitutions.
