= Angie Gallimore =

English footballer

Personal information
- Birth name: Angela Gallimore
- Positions: Defender; forward

Senior career*
Years	Team	Apps	(Gls)
19??-1993	Wigan Ladies		
1993-????	Liverpool		

International career
1981–1988	England	35	(5)

Managerial career
- 19??-1993: Wigan Ladies
- 1993-????: Liverpool
- * Club domestic league appearances and goals

Angela Gallimore is a former England women's international footballer. She competed at the 1984 European Competition for Women's Football where England lost against Sweden. As player-manager she led Knowsley United and Liverpool to back to back FA Women's Cup finals during her club career.

== Club career ==
As player-manager Gallimore led Wigan Ladies to the NW League title as well as the First/Second Division Cup. She left Wigan to join Knowsley United where they finished third in the FA Women's Premier League National Division. As player manager Gallimore led Knowsley United to the final of the 1994 FA Women's Cup where they were defeated 1-0 by Doncaster Belles at Glanford Park. After being renamed as Liverpool, she took the same team to the final again in 1995 where they again finished as runners-up, this time to Arsenal who ran out 3-2 winners.

== International career ==
In November 2022, Gallimore was recognized by The Football Association as one of the England national team's legacy players, and as the 55th women's player to be capped by England.
