= Anita Asante =

English footballer (born 1985)

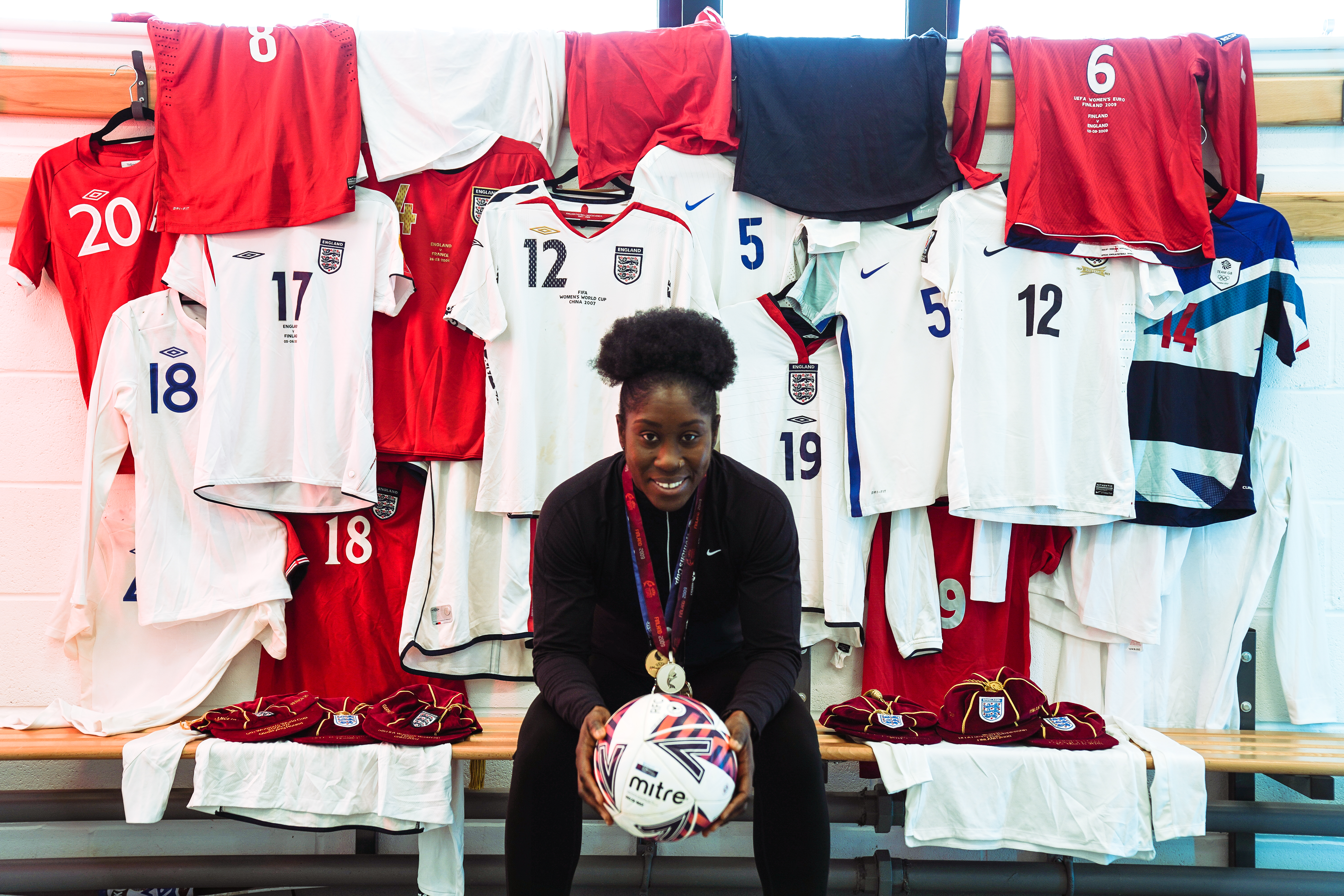
- Asante 2022

Personal information
- Full name: Anita Amma Ankyewah Asante
- Date of birth: 27 April 1985 (age 41)
- Place of birth: London, England
- Height: 1.67 m (5 ft 6 in)
- Positions: Centre-back; defensive midfielder

Youth career
- 1998–2003: Arsenal

Senior career*
Years	Team	Apps	(Gls)
2003–2008	Arsenal	160	
2008–2009	Chelsea	11	(0)
2009	Sky Blue FC	16	(0)
2010	Saint Louis Athletica	1	(0)
2010	Chicago Red Stars	6	(0)
2010	Washington Freedom	6	(0)
2011	Sky Blue FC	12	(0)
2012–2013	Göteborg	41	(9)
2013–2017	FC Rosengård	80	(2)
2018–2020	Chelsea	7	(0)
2020–2022	Aston Villa	35	(2)

International career
2004–2018	England	71	(2)
2012	Great Britain	4	(0)

Managerial career
- 2022-2023: Bristol City Women
- * Club domestic league appearances and goals

Anita Amma Ankyewah Asante (born 27 April 1985) is an English football coach and former player.

== Early life ==
Asante was born in London, and is the eldest of three siblings.

Asante studied Politics and English for her BA at Brunel University Business School, while also benefiting from the UK "Government's Talented Athletes Scholarship Scheme" to assist athletes in full-time education. She started a PhD in the United States on the governance of women's football.

== Club career ==
=== Arsenal ===
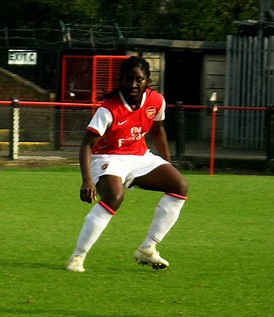
Asante playing for Arsenal

Asante joined Arsenal as a junior in 1998. She attended a training session hosted by Claire Wheatley and Rachel Yankey, which led her to join the club's Centre of Excellence.

She became a senior player in the 2003–04 season.

Asante was part of the Arsenal team that won UEFA Women's Cup (now known as the Women's Champions League) in 2006–07, becoming the first English team to secure the title.

In the same season, Arsenal won the quadruple, collecting the UEFA Women's Cup, FA Women's National Premier League, FA Women's Cup and the FA Women's Premier League Cup.

In total, Asante won 13 trophies during her time at Arsenal, including five league titles.

=== Chelsea ===
On 3 July 2008, it was announced that Asante, along with teammate Lianne Sanderson, had joined rivals Chelsea.

Arsenal manager Vic Akers publicly criticised the players after their departure, saying "You think you've the respect of players, and then they do that. It's a sorry state of affairs."

=== Women's Professional Soccer ===
In 2009, Asante joined New Jersey–based WPS franchise Sky Blue FC. She helped the club win the inaugural WPS championship.

On 6 May 2010, Asante was traded to the Saint Louis Athletica in return for India Trotter. When the Saint Louis Athletica folded on 27 May 2010, she was acquired by the Chicago Red Stars.

She was subsequently traded to the Washington Freedom on 6 August 2010.

In December 2010, Asante returned for a second spell at Sky Blue FC, after Jim Gabarra, her coach at Washington Freedom, took the reins at Sky Blue.

On 30 January 2012, it was announced that the 2012 WPS season would be suspended. In May, it was further announced that the league had folded.

=== Kopparbergs/Göteborg FC ===
With the folding of WPS, Asante signed a contract with Damallsvenskan club Kopparbergs/Göteborg FC (now known as BK Häcken). Her first match for Göteborg was against former club Arsenal in the UEFA Women's Champions League quarter final, a 3–1 first leg defeat.

Asante played 41 league games for Göteborg over two seasons, scoring nine goals. She won the Swedish Cup and the Swedish Super Cup with Göteborg.

=== LdB FC Malmö/FC Rosengård ===
In October 2013, Asante signed with Damallsvenskan champions LdB FC Malmö (known as FC Rosengård since late 2013). Asante, won several titles at the club including the Damallsvenskan league title in 2014, 2015, the 2016 Swedish Cup and the Swedish Super Cup in 2016 and 2017. Asante reached the quarter-finals of the Women's Champions League in three consecutive seasons (2014–15, 2015–16, and 2016–17).

=== Return to Chelsea ===
In December 2017, Asante returned to Chelsea. She suffered an anterior cruciate ligament injury while playing for England at the 2018 SheBelieves Cup, but credited Chelsea's support for her "positive rehab experience".

In her second spell at Chelsea, she won the WSL in the 2017–18 and 2019–20 seasons, the FA Cup in the 2017–18 season, and the Continental Cup in the 2019–20 season.

=== Aston Villa ===
On 7 June 2020, Asante signed for newly promoted team Aston Villa ahead of their maiden WSL campaign. Asante's debut goal for the club was the decider in a 1–0 victory away to rivals Birmingham City. On 26 April 2022, Asante announced her intention to retire from playing at the end of that season.

== International career ==
=== Youth teams ===
Asante played in the England Under 17 team. She also was a member and captain of the England Under 19s and played in the inaugural FIFA World Under 19 Championship in Canada in 2002.

She was called up to the first England Under 21s team in 2004, a month after her senior international début.

=== Senior team ===
Asante made her senior international debut as a substitute against Iceland in May 2004. She scored her first international goal in only her second international start, a victory against Norway in May 2005. Asante was named in England's squad for Euro 2005.

Asante played in the 2011 World Cup and made her 50th senior international appearance in England's 2–0 win over eventual champions Japan. Having been part of the English squad which reached the final of Euro 2009, Asante was confident of England's chances ahead of Euro 2013. She was substituted at half time in England's 3–0 defeat to France which sealed a first round elimination.

In 2015, politically vocal Asante was "a glaring omission" from England's squad for the 2015 World Cup in Canada, having been the only English player to sign a petition against the controversial artificial turf used at the tournament. She criticised the head coach Mark Sampson for the manner in which he informed her of her non selection and his unwillingness to enter into further correspondence on the matter.

Incoming England head coach Phil Neville recalled Asante for the 2018 SheBelieves Cup. At the opening match of the tournament, a 4–1 win over France, Asante suffered an anterior cruciate ligament injury and was substituted after fourteen minutes.

She was allotted 152 when the FA announced their legacy numbers scheme to honour the 50th anniversary of England's inaugural international.

=== Great Britain ===
In June 2012, Asante was named in the 18-player Great Britain squad for the home 2012 London Olympics. She played in all four games; Great Britain were beaten 2–0 by Canada in the quarter finals.

== Post-playing career ==
In 2023, Asante was inducted into the Women's Super League Hall of Fame, alongside Jill Scott and Ellen White.

=== Coaching ===
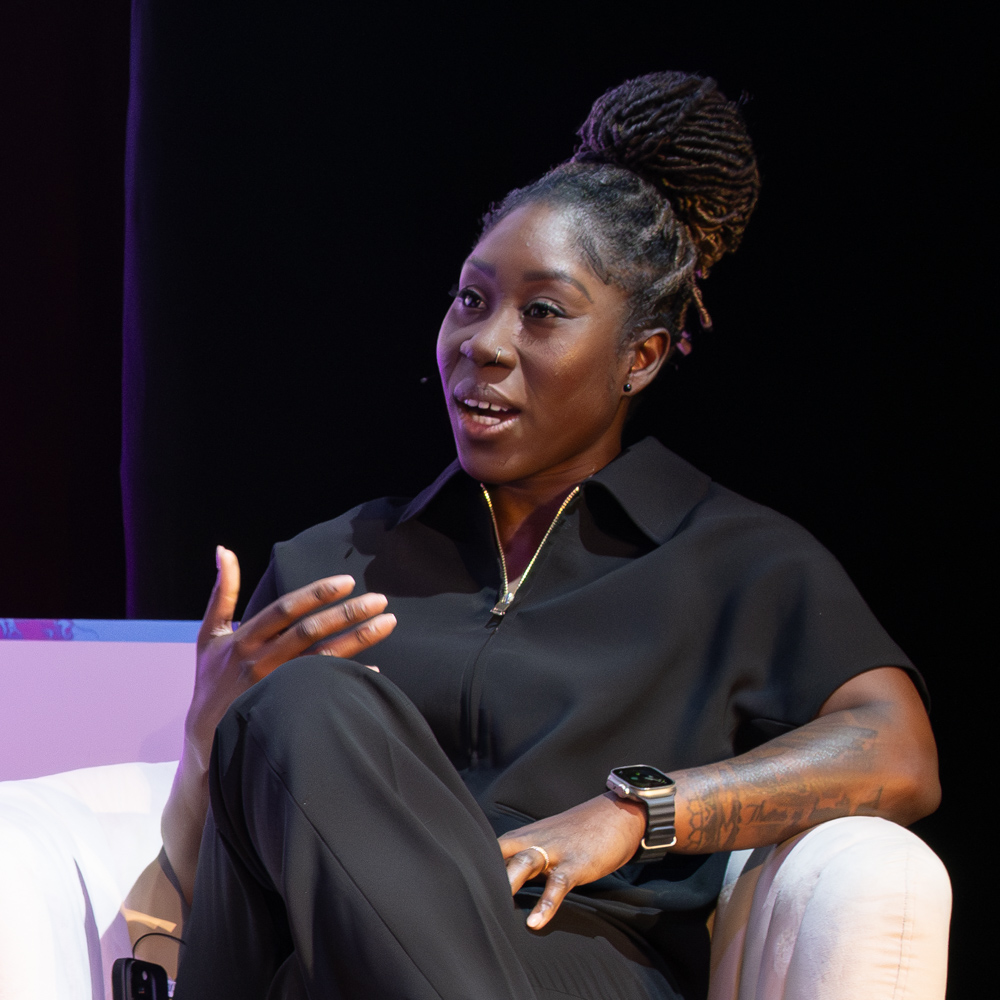
At the 2025 SXSW London festival in London, England.

On 19 July 2022, Asante was announced as first team coach of Women's Championship side Bristol City W.F.C. Bristol City were promoted to the WSL for the 2022–23 season. In 2023, she joined England women's U23 coaching squad.

== Personal life ==
Asante is of Ghanaian descent.

Asante is openly lesbian and is in a relationship with Welsh sports presenter and former hockey player Beth Fisher. They married on 20 January 2023. In June 2023, they welcomed their first child, a daughter.

== International goals ==
Scores and results list England's goal tally first

Goal	Date	Venue	Opponent	Result	Competition	Scored
1	6 May 2005	Oakwell, Barnsley	Norway	1–0	Friendly	1
2	7 March 2014	GSZ Stadium, Larnaca, Cyprus	Finland	3–0	2014 Cyprus Cup	1

== Honours ==
Arsenal

- UEFA Women's Cup: 2007
- FA Women's Cup: 2004, 2006, 2007, 2008
- FA Women's National Premier League: 2004, 2005, 2006, 2007, 2008
- FA Women's Premier League Cup: 2005, 2005, 2007

=== Chelsea ===
- Women's FA Cup: 2017–18
- FA WSL 1: 2017–18, 2019–20
- FA Women's Continental League Cup: 2019–20

Göteborg

- Svenska Cupen: 2012
- Svenska Supercupen: 2013

FC Rosengård

- Svenska Cupen: 2016
- Svenska Supercupen: 2015, runners up; 2016, 2017

Individual

- Outstanding Achievement Awards – 19 May 2006 - Presented by the Queen at Brunel University
- Player of the year – (2003/04)
- Sports Award – (Ghana Professional Awards 2004)
- Nationwide Player of the month – March 2006
- Women's Super League Hall of Fame: 2023
