= Beth Fisher (field hockey) =

Welsh sportswoman

Beth Fisher is a Welsh sports reporter, presenter and a former field hockey international athlete for Wales. She earned 44 caps during her hockey career and is a vocal advocate for LGBT rights.

== Career ==
=== Hockey career ===
Fisher was inspired to play field hockey by her PE teacher, Tanni Grey-Thompson, who competed in the 1998 Commonwealth Games. She was selected for Wales under-16s team. Fisher made her senior debut in 2002. She has previously played for Swansea Hockey Club.

Due to an injury Fisher was unable to participate in the 2014 Commonwealth Games.

In 2015, Fisher became the first LGBT Sport Cymru Ambassador. She became the face of Hockey Wales 2015 #Hocktober campaign, which aimed to promote inclusivity in the Welsh hockey scene. The campaign was popular, with Hockey Wales running out of rainbow laces in within its first week.

In December 2016, Fisher was featured as one of BBC's 100 Women.

Fisher earned 44 caps during her hockey career.

=== Post hockey ===
In May 2019 Fisher joined ITV Cymru Wales as their on air sports reporter. In 2022 Fisher left ITV and began working as a freelancer. Fisher also began working with BBC Wales in 2019, providing commentary for men's football.

Fisher has been vocal about LGBT rights after realising she was a lesbian aged 14 and coming out to her mum when she was 22. She is an ambassador for LGBT+ Sport Cymru and Pride Cymru. In 2015 she served as a board member of Welsh Cycling. Fisher has also previously held roles with Wales Netball, Hockey Wales, and Welsh Gymnastics. In 2020 she became a Stonewall Sports Champion. She has previously called the decision to hold the 2022 FIFA World Cup in Qatar "heartbreaking" and her "worst nightmare", due to their poor record on LGBT rights.

In 2022 she became an honorary fellow at Cardiff University and was part of the jury for the 2022 Ballon d'Or Féminin. Fisher was also listed in Wales Online's 2022 Pinc List.

== Personal life ==
Fisher attended Howell's School, Llandaff and studied Sport & Physical Education at Cardiff Metropolitan University.

Fisher began dating Anita Asante in 2019 and the couple married in January 2023. In February 2023 they announced they were expecting a baby. Discussing the pregnancy later, Asante explained that the couple waited until she had retired from football, so the IVF medication wouldn't disrupt her career. Fisher carried the baby, giving birth in June 2023.
