= Bert Hoyle =

English footballer

Personal information
- Full name: Herbert Hoyle
- Date of birth: 22 April 1920
- Place of birth: Baildon, England
- Date of death: 6 July 2003 (aged 83)
- Place of death: Dawlish, England
- Position: Goalkeeper

Senior career*
Years	Team	Apps	(Gls)
1936–????	Bradford Park Avenue	0	(0)
1946	Wolverhampton Wanderers	0	(0)
1946–1950	Exeter City	82	(0)
1950–1953	Bristol Rovers	105	(0)
1953–????	Exmouth Town		
Total		187	(0)
- * Club domestic league appearances and goals

Herbert Hoyle (22 April 1920 – 6 July 2003) was a professional footballer who played as a goalkeeper in The Football League for Exeter City and Bristol Rovers.

Hoyle was born in Baildon, West Yorkshire, and began his career with local side Bradford Park Avenue, joining them in 1936 at the age of sixteen, but left to join the armed forces without having made his League debut. During the Second World War, he continued to play football in the services while serving in Italy, Yugoslavia and Greece.

On the conclusion of the war, he returned to professional football by joining Wolverhampton Wanderers in May 1946. However, as with Bradford, he did not play any League games for them and he left after only three months to join Exeter City, with whom he finally made his League debut at the age of 26. During four years with The Grecians, Hoyle made 82 appearances in the Football League, sharing the goalkeeping duties with Barney Singleton.

Bristol Rovers paid Exeter a transfer fee of £350 for his services in 1953, and he became a fans' favourite at Eastville Stadium due to his outgoing and likeable personality. He became known for chatting with the fans behind the goal before, during and after matches. He also won acclaim after revealing a fondness for oranges (he always placed one in the back of the net as a lucky charm). He was inundated with gifts of the fruit at every home game – usually thrown by the spectators behind the goals (not an easy feat at Eastville Stadium where a greyhound track lengthened the distance to the goal line). He played in the 105 League games for Rovers in just over two and a half seasons, but his career was brought to a premature end when he was involved in a car crash while driving home to Exeter following an away game against Bristol City in February 1953. He later returned to playing however with non-League side Exmouth Town.

Hoyle played in an era when many footballers had to take second jobs during the summer, and Hoyle worked on local farms during the close-season throughout his career. After retiring, he ran The Ship Inn, a pub in Cockwood, Devon. He died in Dawlish on 6 July 2003, aged 83.
