= Mihoko Ishida =

Japanese footballer and professional singer

Personal information
- Date of birth: June 19, 1982 (age 44)
- Place of birth: Kanagawa, Japan
- Height: 1.60 m (5 ft 3 in)
- Position: Forward

Mihoko Ishida (石田ミホコ, Ishida Mihoko; born June 19, 1982) is a retired Japanese footballer who played for Arsenal. Since retiring from professional football Ishida has become a professional singer. In 2022 Isidia was hired as the assistant coach of Yokohama FC Seagulls, and was made head coach the next season.

== Biography ==
=== Football career ===
Ishida was born on June 19, 1982, in Kanagawa Prefecture, Japan. She began playing football at the age of five and played for a boys' teams until she was in sixth grade. She then played for Nippon TV Menina. She then played for the team of Musashigaoka College. Due to the school partnership with the Arsenal Ladies in England, and played against them. The club offered to join the team, and in 2003, after she graduated from junior college, she joined the English football club Arsenal Ladies. She later returned to Japan in 2006 and joined the Nadeshiko League for JEF United Ichihara Chiba Ladies, where she played as a midfielder. In 2008, she sang the Japanese national anthem in the send-off match between Nadeshiko Japan and Argentina's National Team for the 2008 Olympics. She is the first active person to do so. She retired from playing football in 2009 to focus on her singing career. After retiring, she become the coach of Tokyo International University women's football club. She became the coach of Sfida Setagaya FC in 2019. She was appointed assistant coach of Yokohama FC Seagulls in 2022, and promoted to head coach the next season. In April 2026, she was appointed coach of the Singapore women's national football team.

=== Musical career ===
Her music career began when she was in high school, where she wrote her own songs and played guitar. She said that she was influenced by Bon Jovi. She played with a band while playing for JEF United Ichihara Chiba Ladies. In July 2008, she debuted with her song "Ichibanboshi" (一番星; lit."Number One Star"), which is the official theme song for the All-Japan University Women's Football Championship. She released her second single, "one for ALL" on October 22, 2008. The song is about her gratitude for her teammates. Following her retirement in 2009, she released a cover of the song "Sayonara" by GAO and release her third single "Jitterbug" (ジターバグ).
