= 2003–04 FA Women's Cup =

Tournament details
- Country: England; Wales
- Teams: 206

Final positions
- Champions: Arsenal
- Runners-up: Charlton Athletic
- Penalty shoot-outs do not count towards the total number of goals.

The 2003–04 FA Women's Cup was an association football knockout tournament for women's teams, held between 7 September 2003 and 3 May 2004. It was the 34th season of the FA Women's Cup and was won by Arsenal, who defeated Charlton Athletic in the final. The tournament consisted of two qualifying rounds and eight rounds of competition proper.

All match results and dates from the Women's FA Cup Website.

== First round qualifying ==
All games were played on 7 September 2003.

Tie	Home team (tier)	Score	Away team (tier)	Att.
1	Aylesbury United	1–0	Redhill	
2	Billericay Town	1–4	Southwark Town United	
3	Birstall United	2–1	Kettering Town	
4	Blyth Spartans	2–1 (a.e.t.)	York City	
5	Bolton Ambassadors	2–1	Corwen	
6	Brentford	3–2	Carterton Rangers	
7	Brentwood Town	1–4	Whitehawk	
8	Bristol Manor Farm	1–2	Bath City	
9	Buckfastleigh Rangers	6–1	Cogan Coronation	
10	Bury	7–2	Stockport Celtic	
11	Buxton	5–3 (a.e.t.)	Atherstone United	
12	Cambridge United	7–1	Southam United	
13	Chelmsford City	5–6	Caversham	
14	Crowborough Athletic	7–1	Maidstone Mavrix	
15	Dagenham & Redbridge	17–0	Harlow Town	
16	Darlington Railway Athletic	3–1 (a.e.t.)	Blyth Town	
17	Derby County	4–0	Cosford	
18	Durham City	3–1	Windscale	
19	Dynamo North London	3–3 (5–4 p)	Hastings Town	
20	Haringey Borough	5–1	Basildon United	
21	Haywards Heath Town	1–4	Luton Town Belles	
22	Hendon	2–2 (3–4 p)	Leighton Linslade	
23	Hitchin Town	2–2 (7–6 p)	Bushley Rangers	
24	Hopwood	13–0	Greyhound Gunners	
25	Huddersfield Town	3–2 (a.e.t.)	Crook Town	
26	Hull City	3–4 (a.e.t.)	North Ferriby United	
27	Keynsham Town	12–0	Marazion Blues	
28	Kirklees	0–13	Chester Le Street Town	
29	Launceston	0–5	Team Bath	

Tie	Home team (tier)	Score	Away team (tier)	Att.
30	Leicester City	12–1	Kidderminster Harriers	
31	Lewes	7–1	Thatcham Town	
32	Liverpool Feds	1–8	Darwen	
33	London Colney	3–1	Haywood United	
34	London Women	2–3	Woking	
35	Lordswood	1–4	London Ladies	
36	Loughborough Dynamo	3–2	Walsall	
37	Lumley	10–3	Gateshead Cleveland Hall	
38	Luton Borough	1–4	Tring Athletic	
39	Macclesfield Town	0–3	Bolton Wanderers	
40	Madron	0–7	Alphington	
41	Morley Spurs	2–4	Killingworth YPC	
42	Northampton Town	0–0 (3–4 p)	Wollaston Victoria	
43	Ossett Albion	0–5	Wardley Eagles	
44	Penzance	3–1	Newquay	
45	Plymouth Oak Villa	7–3	Ashdown Rangers	
46	Preston North End	9–1	Penrith Sapphires	
47	Redbridge Raiders	H–W	Mansfield Road	
Walkover for Redbridge Raiders.
48	South Normanton Athletic	0–5	Leafield Athletic	
49	Sporting Links (Caistor)	2–3	Eye United	
50	Swindon Spitfires	H–W	Caldicote Town	
Walkover for Swindon Spitfires.
51	Telford	0–2	Stone Dominoes	
52	The New Saints	H–W	Cambridge City	
Walkover for TNS Ladies.
53	Thurrock & Tilbury	1–11	Tottenham Hotspur	
54	US Valerio Vixens	3–0	Barwell	
55	Viking Rangers	2–5	MK Wanderers	
56	Wigan	A–W	Thorpe United	
Walkover for Thorpe United.
57	Wycombe Wanderers	4–2	Clapton Orient	

== Second round qualifying ==
All games were played on 28 September and 4 October 2003.

Tie	Home team (tier)	Score	Away team (tier)	Att.
1	Abbey Rangers	4–0	Whitstable Town	
2	Alphington	3–2	Gloucester City	
3	Birstall United	4–0	Solihull Glades	
4	Blyth Spartans	3–0	North Ferriby United	
5	Bolton Ambassadors	2–3	Preston North End	
6	Bolton Wanderers	7–1	Huddersfield Town	
7	Bradford City	4–1	Thorpe United	
8	Brentford	10–1	MK Wanderers	
9	Bury	7–4	Durham Royals	
10	Buxton	0–7	Leicester City	
11	Caversham	2–1	Woodbridge Town	
12	Chester Le Street Town	3–1	Lumley	
13	Dagenham & Redbridge	5–1	Aylesbury United	
14	Darwen	4–0	Darlington Railway Athletic	
15	Derby County	6–0	Loughborough Dynamo	
16	Durham City	2–3 (a.e.t.)	Killingworth YPC	
17	Dynamo North London	0–1	Crowborough Athletic	
18	Edgware Town	0–3	Redbridge Raiders	

Tie	Home team (tier)	Score	Away team (tier)	Att.
19	Eye United	3–8	Leafield Athletic	
20	Haringey Borough	0–7	Tottenham Hotspur	
21	Hopwood	5–2	Wardley Eagles	
22	Lewes	5–1	Leighton Linslade	
23	Leyton Orient	6–0	Tring Athletic	
24	London Colney	8–1	London Ladies	
25	Penzance	4–0	Swindon Spitfires	
26	Peterborough United	3–1	Stone Dominoes	
27	Plymouth Oak Villa	8–6	Keynsham Town	
28	Southampton	0–3	Bath City	
29	Southwark Town United	7–1	Royston Town	
30	Team Bath	1–0	Buckfastleigh Rangers	
31	The New Saints	10–0	US Valerio Vixens	
32	Whitehawk	5–0	Woodstock	
33	Woking	5–1	Hitchin Town	
34	Wollaston Victoria	0–1	Cambridge United	
35	Wycombe Wanderers	2–3	Luton Town Belles	

== First round proper ==
All games were scheduled for 26 October 2003.

Tie	Home team (tier)	Score	Away team (tier)	Att.
1	Bath City	3–5	Alphington	
2	Birstall United	3–0	Stafford Rangers	
3	Blackburn Rovers	1–0	Newcastle	
4	Blyth Spartans	2–4	Bury	
5	Bolton Wanderers	1–5	East Durham	
6	Bradford City	1–3 (a.e.t.)	The New Saints	
7	Brentford	5–5 (8–7 p)	Gillingham	
8	Brook House	2–3	Reading Royals	
9	Cambridge United	1–0	Peterborough United	
10	Caversham	0–3	Whitehawk	
11	Chester City	2–0	Barnsley	
12	Colchester United	2–0	Barking	
13	Crewe Vagrants	3–2 (a.e.t.)	Chester Le Street Town	
14	Crowborough Athletic	4–2 (a.e.t.)	Abbey Rangers	
15	Crystal Palace	1–0	Southwark Town United	
16	Dagenham & Redbridge	2–3	Tottenham Hotspur	
17	Darwen	H–W	Ilkeston Town	
Walkover for Darwen.
18	Denham United	2–4	Queens Park Rangers	
19	Derby County	3–5	Leafield Athletic	
20	Doncaster Parkland Rovers	5–0	Leeds City Vixens	

Tie	Home team (tier)	Score	Away team (tier)	Att.
21	Exeter City	1–3	Clevedon	
22	Forest Green Rovers	7–3	Rover Oxford	
23	Killingworth YPC	1–2	Hopwood	
24	Leicester City	2–1	Bedford Town Bells	
25	Lewes	1–0	Norwich City	
26	Leyton Orient	2–1	Woking	
27	Lichfield Diamonds	3–8	Coventry City	
28	London Colney	2–5	West Ham United	
29	Loughborough Students	2–0	Luton Town Belles	
30	Manchester United	2–0	Newsham Park Hospital	
31	Newton Abbot	4–0	Plymouth Argyle	
32	Nottingham Forest	3–2	Rushden & Diamonds	
33	Plymouth Oak Villa	7–6	Swindon Town	
34	Preston North End	5–4	Rotherham United	
35	Reading	3–3 (4–2 p)	Stowmarket Sophtlogic	
36	Redbridge Raiders	3–5	Chesham United	
37	Scunthorpe United	1–2	Blackpool Wren Rovers	
38	Shrewsbury Town	1–2	Garswood Saints	
39	Team Bath	1–5	Cardiff City	
40	Yeovil Town	0–1	Penzance	

== Second round proper ==
All games were originally scheduled for 9 and 16 November 2003.

Tie	Home team (tier)	Score	Away team (tier)	Att.
1	Accrington Stanley Community Trust	0–2	Leicester City	
2	Alphington	0–3	Reading Royals	
3	Birstall United	1–5	Coventry City	
4	Blackpool Wren Rovers	1–0	Doncaster Parkland Rovers	
5	Bury	0–7	Blackburn Rovers	
6	Cambridge United	1–5	Loughborough Students	
7	Cardiff City	5–1	Chesham United	
8	Clevedon	4–1	Plymouth Oak Villa	
9	Crystal Palace	7–1	Crowborough Athletic	
10	Darwen	3–2	Chester City	

Tie	Home team (tier)	Score	Away team (tier)	Att.
11	East Durham	4–2 (a.e.t.)	Preston North End	
12	Garswood Saints	1–4	Manchester United	
13	Gillingham	4–4 (4–2 p)	Lewes	
14	Hopwood	0–5	Crewe Vagrants	
15	Leyton Orient	3–1	Colchester United	
16	Newton Abbot	2–2	Reading	
Match abandoned at 90' due to waterlogged pitch.
replay	Reading	4–1	Newton Abbot	
17	Nottingham Forest	2–0	The New Saints	
18	Penzance	1–2 (a.e.t.)	Forest Green Rovers	
19	Queens Park Rangers	5–4	Tottenham Hotspur	
20	Whitehawk	1–1 (3–4 p)	West Ham United	

== Third round proper ==
All games were originally scheduled for 7 December 2003

Tie	Home team (tier)	Score	Away team (tier)	Att.
1	Barnet	2–4 (a.e.t.)	Cardiff City	
2	Bristol City	0–3	Reading Royals	
3	Chelsea	6–3	Gillingham	
4	Chesterfield	1–2	Manchester United	
5	Clevedon	1–3	Millwall Lionesses	
6	Coventry City	2–3 (a.e.t.)	Southampton Saints	
7	Darwen	2–5	Sheffield Wednesday	
8	East Durham	1–2 (a.e.t.)	Oldham Curzon	
9	Enfield Town	0–0 (2–4 p)	Crystal Palace	
10	Leicester City	2–3	Sunderland	
11	Leyton Orient	4–2	Ipswich Town	

Tie	Home team (tier)	Score	Away team (tier)	Att.
12	Lincoln City	3–1 (a.e.t.)	Manchester City	
13	Loughborough Students	6–2	Blackpool Wren Rovers	
14	Middlesbrough	2–0	Bangor City	
15	Nottingham Forest	3–1	Crewe Vagrants	
16	Portsmouth	3–2	Forest Green Rovers	
17	Queens Park Rangers	0–2	Merthyr Tydfil	
18	Reading	0–3	AFC Wimbledon	
19	Stockport County	2–1	Blackburn Rovers	
20	Watford	1–2 (a.e.t.)	Brighton & Hove Albion	
21	West Ham United	1–1 (3–4 p)	Langford	
22	Wolverhampton Wanderers	2–1 (a.e.t.)	Liverpool	

== Fourth round proper ==
All games were originally scheduled for 4 January 2004.

4 January 2004	Arsenal (1)	3–0	Stockport County (2)	St Albans
	Champ 18'; F. White 75'; Tracy 80'	Report		Stadium: Clarence Park

4 January 2004	Birmingham City (1)	1–0	Loughborough Students (3)	Redditch
	Ballard	Report		Stadium: Valley Stadium

4 January 2004	Bristol Rovers (1)	1–0 (a.e.t.)	Aston Villa (1)
	Green 120'	Report

4 January 2004	Cardiff City (3)	3–1	Merthyr Tydfil (2)
	Goal	Report	Goal

4 January 2004	Charlton Athletic (1)	3–0	Portsmouth (2)	Bromley
	Heatherson 16', 90'; F. Williams 52' (pen.)	Report		Stadium: Hayes Lane

4 January 2004	Chelsea (2)	2–0	Manchester United (3)	Hampton
	Downham 34', 38'	Report		Stadium: Beveree; Attendance: 162

4 January 2004	Doncaster Rovers Belles (1)	2–1	Leeds United (1)	Doncaster
	Hunt	Report	Panesar	Stadium: Belle Vue

4 January 2004	Everton (1)	2–1	Langford (2)
	Worrall 46', 81'	Report	Fensom 7'

4 January 2004	Fulham (1)	5–0	Sunderland (2)	Motspur Park
	McArthur; C. White; Duncan; Phillip	Report		Stadium: Fulham Training Ground

4 January 2004	Lincoln City (2)	1–3	Leyton Orient (4)	Lincoln
	Goal	Report	Goal	Stadium: Sincil Bank

4 January 2004	Middlesbrough (2)	1–0 (a.e.t.)	Southampton Saints (2)
	Goal	Report

4 January 2004	Nottingham Forest (3)	3–0	Oldham Curzon (2)	Basford
	Goal	Report		Stadium: Greenwich Avenue

4 January 2004	Reading Royals (3)	2–1	Millwall Lionesses (2)
	Goal	Report	Goal

4 January 2004	Sheffield Wednesday (2)	1–0	Crystal Palace (3)
	Goal	Report

4 January 2004	Tranmere Rovers (1)	5–3	Brighton & Hove Albion (2)
	Taylor	Report	Goal

4 January 2004	Wolverhampton Wanderers (2)	6–2	AFC Wimbledon (2)	Willenhall
	Goal	Report	Mulligan 16'; Nethercoat 90'	Stadium: Aspray Arena; Attendance: 43

== Fifth round proper ==
All games were played on 25 January 2004.

25 January 2004	Cardiff City (3)	2–1	Everton (1)
	Fishlock 14'; Miller 87'	Report	Kane 75'

25 January 2004	Charlton Athletic (1)	2–1	Fulham (1)	Northfleet
	Walker 76'; Stoney 79'	Report	Yankey 87'	Stadium: Stonebridge Road

25 January 2004	Chelsea (2)	3–3 (a.e.t.) (1–2 p)	Nottingham Forest (3)	Hampton
	De la Salle 46'; Jones 81'; Grogan 120'	Report	19'; 80'	Stadium: Beveree
	Penalties
	Penalty missed Penalty scored		Penalty scored Penalty missed

25 January 2004	Doncaster Rovers Belles (1)	4–0	Wolverhampton Wanderers (2)
	Exley; Burke; Handley; Hunt	Report

25 January 2004	Leyton Orient (4)	1–6	Birmingham City (2)
	Goal	Report	Goal

25 January 2004	Middlesbrough (2)	1–6	Arsenal (1)	Stockton-on-Tees
	Ford	Report	Sanderson; Ludlow; Fleeting; Potter	Stadium: Bishopton Road West

25 January 2004	Reading Royals (3)	1–9	Bristol Rovers (1)
	Goal	Report	T. Williams

25 January 2004	Tranmere Rovers (1)	1–0	Sheffield Wednesday (2)	Heswall
	Goal	Report		Stadium: Gayton Park

== Quarter–finals ==
All games were played on 8 February 2004.

8 February 2004	Arsenal (1)	11–1	Cardiff City (3)	London Colney
	Maggs 24', 70'; Fleeting 28', 57', 80'; Champ 78'; Potter 55', 75'; Lorton	Report	Fishlock 43'	Stadium: Arsenal Training Centre

8 February 2004	Doncaster Rovers Belles (1)	0–1	Charlton Athletic (1)	Harworth Bircotes
		Report	Broadhurst 54'	Stadium: Recreation Ground; Referee: Mr D Foster (Newcastle)

8 February 2004	Nottingham Forest (3)	0–3	Bristol Rovers (1)
		Report	Curtis 70'; T. Williams

8 February 2004	Tranmere Rovers (1)	2–3	Birmingham City (1)	Heswall
	Taylor (pen.) 80'	Report	Ward; Carney; Lacey	Stadium: Gayton Park

== Semi–finals ==
All games were played on 14 March 2004.

14 March 2004	Bristol Rovers (1)	0–2	Arsenal (1)	Bristol
		Report	Fleeting 74'; F. White 77'	Stadium: Memorial Stadium; Attendance: 1,382

14 March 2004	Birmingham City (1)	0–1	Charlton Athletic (1)	Solihull
		Report	Walker 60'	Stadium: Damson Park; Attendance: 1,234

== Final ==
3 May 2004
13:00 BST

Arsenal	3–0	Charlton Athletic
Fleeting 23', 25', 83'	Report

Loftus Road, London
Attendance: 12,244
Referee: Amy Rayner
