= 1994–95 FA Women's Cup =

Tournament details
- Country: England & Wales

Final positions
- Champions: Arsenal
- Runners-up: Liverpool
- Penalty shoot-outs do not count towards the total number of goals.

The 1994–95 FA Women's Cup was an association football knockout tournament for women's teams, held between 18 September 1994 and 30 April 1995. It was the 25th season of the FA Women's Cup and was won by Arsenal, who defeated Liverpool in the final.

The tournament consisted eight rounds of competition proper.

All match results and dates from the Women's FA Cup Website.

== First round proper ==
All games were scheduled for 18 September 1994.

Tie	Home team (tier)	Score	Away team (tier)	Att.
1	Abbey Rangers	0–7	Binfield	
2	Amble Town	0–1	Cleveland	
3	Bangor City	1–3	Leek Town	
4	Barnet	1–5	Bedford Bells	
5	Blackburn Rovers	3–0	Brighouse	
6	Bolton	1–4	Manchester United	
7	Brislington	1–6	Southampton	
8	Bristol City	A–W	Bristol Rovers	
Walkover for Bristol City
9	Cardiff Institute	1–3	Tongwynlais	
10	Carterton Town	0–2	Crowborough Athletic	
11	Chailey Mavericks	H–W	Chislehurst United	
Walkover for Chailey Mavericks
12	Charlton	11–1	Milton Keynes United	
13	Chesterfield	5–4	Derby City	
14	City Roses	2–5	Barnsley	
15	Clapton Orient	3–4	Slough Town	
16	Clevedon Town	8–1	Gloucester Greyhounds	
17	Collier Row	5–1	Colchester United	
18	Comets	0–9	Eastleigh	
19	Derby County	5–4	Rugby	
20	Dorchester	A–W	Truro City	
Walkover for Truro City
21	Dunstable	4–6	Mill Hill United	
22	Edenbridge Town	0–7	Newbury	
23	Enfield	3–3	St Germaine	
replay	St Germaine	2–3	Enfield	
24	Farnborough	9–1	Teynham Gunners	
25	Frome	10–1	Sturminster Newton	
26	Fulham	7–1	Leighton Linslade	
27	Gillingham	1–6	Lambeth	
28	Gosport Borough	7–2	Sutton Athletic	
29	Grimsby	A–W	Bradford City	
Walkover for Bradford City
30	Harlow Town	3–1	Clacton	

Tie	Home team (tier)	Score	Away team (tier)	Att.
31	Haslingden	5–1	Wrexham	
32	Havant	2–6	St George's	
33	Huddersfield Town	12–0	Newcastle	
34	Isle of Wight	0–6	Surbiton Town	
35	Leicester City	3–4	Birmingham City	
36	Manchester Belle Vue	4–1	Manchester City	
37	Middlesbrough	3–0	Wakefield	
38	Milton Keynes Athletic	0–7	Leyton Orient	
39	Nettleham	5–0	Sparta Nottingham	
40	Oldham Athletic	7–2	Port Vale	
41	Pagham	4–3	Hassocks	
42	Peterborough Diamonds	0–11	Highfield Rangers	
43	Plymouth Pilgrims	4–2	Cheltenham YMCA	
44	Preston Rangers	6–1	Kilnhurst	
45	Pye	0–2	Calverton MW	
46	Queens Park Rangers	8–1	Redbridge Wanderers	
47	Radcliffe Borough	7–0	Chester City	
48	Rainworth Miners Welfare	0–2	Notts County	
49	Rochdale	1–7	Wigan	
50	Sheffield Hallam United	5–0	Vernon–Carus	
51	Sittingbourne	3–3 (a.e.t.)	Reading Royals	
replay	Reading Royals	3–3 (4–2 p)	Sittingbourne	
52	South Lakes	0–6	South Shields	
53	Stockport	1–5	Tranmere Rovers	
54	Swindon Town	8–0	Weymouth	
55	Swindon Town Spitfires	3–1	Bournemouth	
56	Watford	6–0	Wycombe Wanderers	
57	Whitehawk	5–0	Palace Eagles	
58	Wiggington Grasshoppers	2–3	Oakland Rangers	
59	Worcester City	8–2	Exeter Rangers	
60	Worthing	0–4	Portsmouth	
61	Yate Town	0–6	Torquay United	

== Second round proper ==
All games were originally scheduled for 16 October 1994.

Tie	Home team (tier)	Score	Away team (tier)	Att.
1	Bedford Bells	0–2	Sheffield Wednesday	
2	Berkhamsted & Hemel	9–1	Epsom & Ewell	
3	Brentford	6–3	Farnborough	
4	Brighton & Hove Albion	14–0	Reading	
5	Bristol	A–W	Tongwynlais	
Walkover for Tongwynlais
6	Chesterfield	2–5	Villa Aztecs	
7	Clevedon Town	0–9	Oxford United	
8	Colchester Royals	3–1	Pagham	
9	Collier Row	0–2	Enfield	
10	Crowborough Athletic	0–7	Wimbledon	
11	Fulham	2–5	Ipswich Town	
12	Gosport Borough	1–8	Bristol City	
13	Harlow Town	2–0	Watford	
14	Haslingden	0–5	Bronte	
15	Highfield Rangers	2–3	Solihull Borough	
16	Huddersfield Town	16–0	Barnsley	
17	Inter Cardiff	2–4	Plymouth Pilgrims	
18	Lambeth	1–0	Binfield	
19	Leek Town	1–4	Nottingham Argyle	
20	Leyton Orient	25–0	Slough Town	
21	Maidstone Tigresses	2–1	Charlton	
22	Mill Hill United	0–1	Horsham	

Tie	Home team (tier)	Score	Away team (tier)	Att.
23	Nettleham	1–6	Kidderminster Harriers	
24	Newsham Park Hospital	3–4	St Helens / Garswood	
25	Notts County	7–0	Derby County	
26	Oakland Rangers	1–7	Radcliffe Borough	
27	Oldham Athletic	5–1	Blackburn Rovers	
28	Portsmouth	2–3	Newbury	
29	Preston Rangers	5–2	Middlesbrough	
30	Reading Royals	2–4	Langford	
31	Sheffield Hallam United	2–6	Cowgate Kestrels	
32	South Shields	0–11	Manchester Belle Vue	
33	St George's	1–2	Surbiton Town	
34	Stockport County	1–2	Calverton MW	
35	Swindon Town	2–1 (a.e.t.)	Southampton	
36	Swindon Town Spitfires	3–4	Truro City	
37	Torquay United	4–1	Eastleigh	
38	Town & County	22–0	Chailey Mavericks	
39	Tranmere Rovers	8–0	Cleveland	
40	Warrington Town	3–4	Manchester United	
41	Whitehawk	7–0	Queens Park Rangers	
42	Wigan	2–0	Bradford City	
43	Wilford	A–W	Birmingham City	
Walkover for Birmingham City
44	Worcester City	4–3	Frome	

== Third round proper ==
All games were originally scheduled for 13 November 1994.

Tie	Home team (tier)	Score	Away team (tier)	Att.
1	Berkhamsted & Hemel	3–4	Wimbledon	
2	Brighton & Hove Albion	5–1	Whitehawk	
3	Bristol City	7–1	Kidderminster Harriers	
4	Enfield	6–1	Colchester Royals	
5	Harlow Town	0–1	Surbiton Town	
6	Ipswich Town	0–0	Horsham	
replay	Horsham	0–5	Ipswich Town	
7	Leyton Orient	6–1	Lambeth	
8	Maidstone Tigresses	2–0	Langford	
9	Manchester Belle Vue	3–1	Solihull Borough	
10	Notts County	4–2	Nottingham Argyle	
11	Oldham Athletic	2–1	Birmingham City	
12	Oxford United	8–1	Torquay United	

Tie	Home team (tier)	Score	Away team (tier)	Att.
13	Plymouth Pilgrims	3–1	Tongwynlais	
14	Preston Rangers	1–4	Cowgate Kestrels	
15	Radcliffe Borough	3–6	Calverton MW	
16	St Helens / Garswood	4–2	Bronte	
17	Swindon Town	3–4	Newbury	
18	Town & County	3–4	Brentford	
19	Tranmere Rovers	5–5 (a.e.t.)	Sheffield Wednesday	
replay	Sheffield Wednesday	2–5	Tranmere Rovers	
20	Truro City	2–2 (a.e.t.)	Worcester City	
replay	Worcester City	2–5	Truro City	
21	Villa Aztecs	4–4	Huddersfield Town	
Replayed after Huddersfield fielded an inellegible player
replay	Huddersfield Town	4–0	Villa Aztecs	
22	Wigan	4–1	Manchester United	

== Fourth round proper ==
All games were originally scheduled for 4 December 1994. Ilkeston Town's match with Brighton & Hove Albion was twice cancelled due to a waterlogged pitch, and was played on 18 December 1994 instead.

4 December 1994	Arsenal (1)	3–0	Maidstone Tigresses (2)	Potters Bar
	Spacey 35'; Britton; Wylie	Report		Stadium: The Lantern Stadium; Referee: S. Ryan

4 December 1994	Brentford (2)	2–2 (a.e.t.)	Red Star Southampton (1)	Perivale
	Goal	Report	Goal	Stadium: Reynolds Field

11 December 1994 Replay	Red Star Southampton (1)	2–1	Brentford (2)
	Goal	Report	Goal

4 December 1994	Bristol City (3)	6–2	Plymouth Pilgrims (3)
	Goal	Report	Goal

4 December 1994	Calverton MW (3)	0–12	Wembley (1)
		Report	Smith 5', 7'; Grant 10', 28', 36', 79'; Liran 11'; Lorton 20', 56'; Harwood 30'; Kock 48'; Spencer 60'

4 December 1994	Doncaster Belles (1)	6–0	Truro City (3)	Doncaster
	Walker; Skillcorn; Woodhead; Coultard	Report		Stadium: Belle Vue

4 December 1994	Leyton Orient (3)	7–0	Enfield (3)	Walthamstow
	Goal	Report		Stadium: Wadham Lodge

4 December 1994	Liverpool (1)	8–0	Surbiton Town (3)
	Goal	Report

4 December 1994	Manchester Belle Vue (3)	2–3	Wigan (3)
	Goal	Report	Goal

4 December 1994	Newbury (3)	1–2	Notts County (3)	Hermitage
	Goal	Report	Goal	Stadium: Denison Barracks

4 December 1994	Oldham Athletic (3)	1–7	Croydon (1)	Oldham
	Dean 22'	Report	Wilson 8'; Cottier; Sempare 43', 67'; Smith; (o.g.); Allison	Stadium: Boundary Park

4 December 1994	St Helens / Garswood (2)	2–1	Oxford United (2)
	Goal	Report	Goal

4 December 1994	Tranmere Rovers (3)	1–3	Leasowe Pacific (1)
	Morella	Report	Collins; Reilly; Thomas

4 December 1994	Wimbledon (2)	3–0	Cowgate Kestrels (2)	Tooting
	Hughes 28', 88'; Searle 38'	Report		Stadium: Sandy Lane

4 December 1994	Wolverhampton Wanderers (1)	0–2	Millwall Lionesses (1)	Willenhall
		Report	Rayner; Fletcher	Stadium: Noose Lane

11 December 1994	Huddersfield Town (3)	7–3	Ipswich Town (2)
	Brannan; Fogarty; Mitchell; Knight; Mitchell	Report	Goal

18 December 1994	Ilkeston Town Rangers (1)	5–1	Brighton & Hove Albion (2)
	Plinston; Brown; Rudd	Report	Goal
Note: Match was postponed twice due to a waterlogged pitch

== Fifth round proper ==
All games were played on 15 January 1995.

15 January 1995	Arsenal (1)	3–1	Leasowe Pacific (1)	Potters Bar
	Spacey 1'; Lonergan 32', 65'	Report	Goal	Stadium: The Lantern Stadium; Referee: D. Thomas

15 January 1995	Bristol City (3)	3–2	Millwall Lionesses (1)
	Dean; Bond; Simms	Report	Goal

15 January 1995	Huddersfield Town (3)	3–1	Ilkeston Town Rangers (1)
	Fogerty; Brannan 59'; Knight 60'	Report	Muff

15 January 1995	Leyton Orient (3)	3–1	Red Star Southampton (1)	Walthamstow
	Goal	Report	Goal	Stadium: Wadham Lodge

15 January 1995	Liverpool (1)	5–0	Notts County (3)	Kirkby
	Goal	Report		Stadium: Kirkby Sports Centre

15 January 1995	Wembley (1)	3–3 (a.e.t.)	Doncaster Belles (1)
	Liran 10', 80' (pen.); Darby	Report	Walker 5' 75'

22 January 1995 Replay	Doncaster Belles (1)	2–1	Wembley (1)	Stainforth
	Walker 13', 85'	Report	Lorton 90'	Stadium: Stainforth Miners' Welfare; Attendance: 200

15 January 1995	Wigan (3)	1–3	St Helens/Garswood (2)	Ashton-in-Makerfield
	Goal	Report	Goal	Stadium: Edge Green Street

15 January 1995	Wimbledon (2)	0–5	Croydon (1)	Mitcham
		Report	Davis 46' 66'; Wilson 26'; McGloin 28'	Stadium: Sandy Lane

== Quarter–finals ==
All games were played on 12 February 1995.

12 February 1995	Bristol City (3)	4–3	Huddersfield Town (3)
	Sim 2', 5'; Dean; Dury 90'	Report	Brannan 24', 89'; Mitchell 34'

12 February 1995	Doncaster Belles (1)	4–0	St Helens / Garswood (2)	Doncaster
	Jackson; Coulthard; Broadhurst	Report		Stadium: Belle Vue

12 February 1995	Leyton Orient (3)	1–8	Arsenal (1)	Walthamstow
	Goal	Report	Spacey; Williams; Pealling; Ball; Churchman	Stadium: Wadham Lodge

19 February 1995	Liverpool (1)	3–0	Croydon (1)
	Harper 10'; Burke; Ryde 58'	Report
Note: Match was rescheduled after being postponed

== Semi–finals ==
All games were played on 19 March 1995.

19 March 1995	Bristol City (3)	0–5	Liverpool (1)	Mangotsfield
		Report	Harper 20'; Oldham 28'; Hewitt 30'; Burke 58', 83'	Stadium: Cossham Street; Attendance: 1,800; Referee: Brian Bishop

19 March 1995	Doncaster Belles (1)	1–3 (a.e.t.)	Arsenal (1)	Rotherham
13:00 GMT	Walker 21'	Report	Britton 36'; Pealling; Spacey 112'	Stadium: Millmoor; Referee: J. Hardy

== Final ==
30 April 1995
13:15 BST

Liverpool	2–3	Arsenal
Burke 24', 41'	Report	Lonergan 36', 55'; Spacey 81'

Prenton Park, Birkenhead
Attendance: 3,000
Referee: Jeff Winter
