= Donna Smith (footballer) =

English footballer

Personal information
- Date of birth: 17 January 1967 (age 59)
- Place of birth: England
- Height: 1.73 m (5 ft 8 in)
- Position: Defender

Senior career*
Years	Team	Apps	(Gls)
–1994	Brighton & Hove Albion Women		
1994-;	Croydon Women		

International career
1994-1996;	England	3	(0)
- * Club domestic league appearances and goals

Donna Smith (born 17 January 1967) is an English former international women's football defender. She was a member of the England squad for the 1995 FIFA Women's World Cup Finals.

== Club career ==
In 1995, Smith was playing for Croydon Women, after signing from Brighton & Hove Albion Women in 1994. A tall, strong and versatile defender, Smith won the club Players' and Manager's Player of the Year awards in Croydon's double winning 1995–96 season. Her other career as a firefighter allowed Smith to exhibit high fitness levels on the football pitch.

== International career ==
Smith was a member of the England squad for the 1995 Women's World Cup, but failed to make an appearance.

She was given number 101 when the FA announced their legacy numbers scheme to honour the 50th anniversary of England's inaugural international.
