= Heswall F.C. =

Association football club in England

Heswall
- Full name: Heswall Football Club
- Nickname: The Yellow Bus
- Founded: 1891
- Ground: Gayton Park
- Chairman: Robbie Matthews
- Manager: Ben Scoffield
- League: West Cheshire League
- 2025–26: West Cheshire League Division One, 12th of 16
Home colours

Heswall Football Club is an association football club based in Heswall, Merseyside, England. They are currently members of the West Cheshire League Division One. The club is a FA Charter Standard Club affiliated to the Cheshire Football Association.

== History ==
The club was founded in 1891. In the early years the club played in Division two of the West Cheshire Association Football League from the 1894–95 season until the end of the 1910–11 season, winning the division once in the 1906–07 campaign, but not gaining promotion to Division One.

In 1958 the club rejoined Division Two of the West Cheshire League, finishing as runners-up at their first attempt. The club remained in Division Two until the end of the 1968–69 season, when they earned promotion to Division One as champions. The club remained in Division one until the end of the 1981–82 season, when they left the league. Just a few seasons before this the club made its debut in the FA Vase in the 1978–79 season, but getting knocked out immediately by Linotype F.C. in the preliminary qualify round. They did better the following season, making it to the 3rd round, a feat they would repeat a further two times.

The 1988–89 season saw the club return to Division one of the West Cheshire League, and the 2004–05 season saw the club become champions of the league. The club repeated this feat in the 2012–13 season, but they were relegated the following season. They bounced back up as runners-up of Division two at their first attempt, to return to Division one. The club stayed in Division one for three seasons, being relegated back to Division Two, when they had a 15-point deduction for failing to play 5 games.

== Ground ==
Since 1971 the club has played its home games at Gayton Park. In 2020, a number of renovations have taken place at the ground.

== Honours ==
- West Cheshire Association Football League
  - Division One Champions (7) 1935–36, 1936–37, 1937–38, 1984–85, 1987–88, 2004–05, 2012–13
  - Division Two Champions (6) 1906–7, 1968–69, 1989–90, 1990–91, 1996–97, 1998–99
- Cheshire Football Association Amateur Cup
  - Winners (3) 1938–39, 1991–92 & 2011–12
- Wirral District FA Senior Cup
  - Winners (7) 1938–39, 1984–85, 1991–92, 1995–96, 1996–97, 1997–98, 1998–99
- Wirral District FA Amateur Cup
  - Winners (10) 1931–32, 1932–33, 1933–34, 1935–36, 1936–37, 1976–77, 1986–87, 1995–96, 1998–99, 2003–04
- Wirral District FA Junior Cup
  - Winner (1) 1919 - 1920
- Pyke Cup
  - Winner (4) 1932–33, 1938–39, 1984–85, 1996–97
- Bill Weight Trophy
  - Winner (1) 1991–92
- West Cheshire League Bowl Sponsored by Haworth & Gallagher
  - Winner (3) 1989–90, 1998–99, 2020–21
- West Cheshire League Development Trophy
  - Winner (1) 2015–16

== Notable players ==
Alan Reeves played for Heswall during the 1987–88 season and later went on to make over 400 appearances for Football League clubs including Wimbledon F.C. and Swindon Town. Reeves' brother Dave Reeves, also spent a season with Heswall before beginning his career with Sheffield Wednesday. Graham Branch had a stellar career with Tranmere Rovers & Burnley. Ian Woan started his career with Heswall alongside his brother Alan, winning the league before a sterling career with Nottingham Forest, where he was briefly assistant manager but was sacked alongside Sean Dyche.
