= Emma Coss =

English footballer (born in 1979)

Personal information
- Full name: Emma Coss
- Date of birth: 9 May 1979 (age 47)
- Position: Midfielder

Senior career*
Years	Team	Apps	(Gls)
1995–2002	Arsenal		
2002–2005	Charlton Athletic		
- * Club domestic league appearances and goals

Emma Coss (born 9 May 1979) is a former English female footballer.

After playing professionally for Arsenal, she joined Charlton late during the 2001/02 season and was also capable of playing in defensive positions. During the 2003–04 FA Women's Premier League Cup, she came on as a substitute and with her first touch, scored the only goal to secure victory for Charlton Athletic, the club's first major trophy.

Prior to pursuing a professional football career, Coss had taken up modelling. During a photo shoot, she turned up with a broken nose from playing football and the agency demanded she quit playing, however she chose to give up modelling due to her love of playing football. In her youth, Coss considered herself to be a tomboy and would play in boy's teams up to her early teens. In 2003, she described her favourite footballer as David Beckham.

== Honours ==
Arsenal

- FA Women's Cup: 1995

Charlton

- FA Women's Cup: 2005
- FA Women's Premier League Cup: 2003–04
