= 2003–04 FA Women's Premier League Cup =

Tournament details
- Country: England
- Dates: 31 August 2003 – 28 March 2004
- Teams: 34

Final positions
- Champions: Charlton Athletic
- Runners-up: Fulham

The 2003–04 FA Women's Premier League Cup was the 13th edition of the FA Women's Premier League Cup, a football cup tournament for teams at both levels of the FA Women's Premier League (level 1, the National Division, and level 2, the Northern and Southern Divisions). The 2004 cup final was won by Charlton Athletic, who defeated Fulham 1–0, with the only goal of the game scored by Emma Coss.

== Results ==
The division each team play in is indicated in brackets after their name: (NA)=National Division; (NO)=Northern Division; (S)=Southern Division.

=== First round ===
Matches were played on 14 September 2003.

14 September 2003	Arsenal (NA)	4–0	Ipswich Town (S)
	Thomas 18'; Ludlow; Potter 90'	Report

14 September 2003	Aston Villa (NA)	5–0	AFC Wimbledon (S)
	Carter-Rix; Hawkins	Report

14 September 2003	Barnet (S)	2–4	Bangor City (NO)
	Goal	Report	Goal

14 September 2003	Birmingham City (NA)	0–4	Fulham (NA)
		Report	Ritchie; Yankey; Yorsten; Bird

14 September 2003	Brighton & Hove Albion (S)	0–7	Charlton Athletic (NA)	Three Bridges
		Report	Broadhurst 28'; Walker 41'; Stoney 46'; Pond 56', 75'; Smith 62'; F. Williams 88'	Stadium: Jubilee Field

14 September 2003	Enfield Town (S)	1–5	Lincoln City (NO)
	Goal	Report	Goal

14 September 2003	Everton (NA)	3–0	Manchester City (NO)
	Howden; Boyle; McDougall	Report

14 September 2003	Langford (S)	1–0	Sheffield Wednesday (NO)
	Goal	Report

14 September 2003	Leeds United (NA)	3–1	Bristol City (S)
	Goal	Report	Goal

14 September 2003	Liverpool (NO)	0–1	Bristol Rovers (NA)
		Report	Goal

14 September 2003	Middlesbrough (NO)	3–1	Chelsea (S)
	Goal	Report	Goal

14 September 2003	Oldham Curzon (NO)	4–2	Merthyr Tydfil (S)
	Goal	Report	Goal

14 September 2003	Southampton Saints (S)	1–3	Doncaster Rovers Belles (NA)
	Goal	Report	Goal

14 September 2003	Sunderland (NO)	3–0	Stockport County (S)
	Goal	Report

14 September 2003	Watford (S)	1–7	Tranmere Rovers (NA)
	Causbrook	Report	Pryce; Rigby; Jones; Schueber; Taylor

14 September 2003	Wolverhampton Wanderers (NO)	2–1	Portsmouth (S)
	Goal	Report	Goal

=== Second round ===
Matches were played on 12 October 2003.

12 October 2003	Middlesbrough (NO)	1–5	Bristol Rovers (NA)
	Goal	Report	Goal

12 October 2003	Charlton Athletic (NA)	10–1	Bangor City (SO)
	Heatherson 11', 33', 38', 60'; Broadhurst 54', 90'; F. Williams 64'; Smith 68', 80'; Hunn 75'	Report	King 85'

12 October 2003	Arsenal (NA)	4–2	Sunderland (NO)
	Lorton 25'; Grant 30' 80'	Report	Houghton 7'; Lanaghan 51'

12 October 2003	Tranmere Rovers (NO)	1–5	Doncaster Belles (NA)
	Taylor	Report	Twaddle; Owen; (o.g.); Burke; Hunt (o.g.)

12 October 2003	Fulham (NA)	9–0	Langford (SO)
	Chapman; Duncan 85'; Flint; Yanlkey; McArthur	Report

12 October 2003	Wolverhampton Wanderers (NO)	1–1 (4–3 p)	Lincoln City (NO)
	Goal	Report	Goal
	Penalties
	Penalty scored		Penalty scored Penalty missed

12 October 2003	Leeds United (NA)	7–0	Everton (NA)
	Daniel; Culvin (pen.); Ward	Report

12 October 2003	Aston Villa (NA)	2–1	Oldham Curzon (NO)
	Goal	Report	Goal

=== Quarter-finals ===
Matches were played on 2 and 9 November 2003.

2 November 2003	Arsenal (NA)	4–0	Doncaster Rovers Belles (NA)
	Kemp 4'; Ludlow 45', 64'; Sanderson 78'	Report

2 November 2003	Wolverhampton Wanderers (NO)	4–0	Charlton Athletic (NA)
		Report	Walker 20', 32'; F. Williams 24'; Barr 69' (pen.)

2 November 2003	Bristol Rovers (NA)	4–1	Aston Villa (NA)
	Curtis; Martyn; T. Williams; Green	Report	Smith

9 November 2003	Leeds United (NA)	2–3	Fulham (NA)
	Dunn 28'; Ward 34'	Report	Duncan 29'; Ritchie 79'; McArthur 90+1'

=== Semi-finals ===
Matches were played on the 14th December 2003.

14 December 2003	Fulham (NA)	7–0	Bristol Rovers (NA)
14:00	McArthur 19'; Chapman; Yankey; Jerray-Silver	Report

14 December 2003	Charlton Athletic (NA)	2–1	Arsenal (NA)	Northfleet
14:00	Hunn 8'; Barr 65'	Report	Grant 74'	Stadium: Stonebridge Road

=== Final ===
28 March 2004
12:00

Charlton Athletic	1–0	Fulham
Coss 34'	Report

Underhill Stadium, Barnet
Attendance: 1,419
