= 2000–01 Arsenal L.F.C. season =

English women's football club season

Arsenal Ladies
2000–01 season
- Chairman: Peter Hill-Wood
- Manager: Vic Akers
- Stadium: Meadow Park
- Premier League: Winners
- FA Cup: Winners
- Premier League Cup: Winners
- Charity Shield: Winners
- London County Cup: Runners Up
- Top goalscorer: League: Angela Banks (30); All: Angela Banks (44)
- Biggest win: 11–0 (vs Liverpool (H), Premier League, 3 December 2000)
- Biggest defeat: 0–3 (vs Fulham (N), London County Cup, 25 April 2001)
Home colours	Away colours	Third colours

The 2000–01 season was Arsenal Ladies Football Club's 14th season since forming in 1987. The club participated in the National Division of the FA Women's Premier League, winning their 4th League title since promotion with an unbeaten campaign. They completed a domestic treble by winning the FA Cup and the Premier League Cup by defeating Fulham 1–0 and Tranmere Rovers 3–0 in the respective Finals.

Arsenal were also invited to play in the inaugural Charity Shield against newly formed Charlton Athletic (formerly Croydon). The Shield was shared between the two sides after the game ended 1–1. They were not able to retain the London County Cup however, losing 3–0 to Fulham in the Final. By winning the Premier League, Arsenal qualified for the first edition of the UEFA Women's Cup.

== Squad information & statistics ==
=== First team squad ===
Squad statistics correct as of May 2001

Name	Date of birth (age)	Since	Signed from
Goalkeepers
(Republic of Ireland) Emma Byrne	14 June 1979 (aged 22)	2000	(Denmark) Fortuna Hjørring
(England) Jasmine Cripps	4 November 1985 (aged 15)	1998	(England) Arsenal Academy
(England) Lesley Higgs	25 October 1965 (aged 35)	1997	(England) Wembley
(England) Aman Dosanj	9 September 1983 (aged 17)	1999	(England) Southampton Saints
(England) Toni-Anne Wayne	8 May 1983 (aged 18)	2000	(England) Arsenal Academy
Defenders
(England) Kirsty Pealling	14 April 1975 (aged 26)	1987	(England) Arsenal Academy
(Scotland) Pauline MacDonald	17 April 1975 (aged 26)	1999	(Scotland) Cumbernauld United
(England) Faye White	2 February 1978 (aged 23)	1996	(England) Three Bridges
(England) Clare Wheatley	4 February 1971 (aged 30)	1995	(England) Chelsea
(Republic of Ireland) Yvonne Tracy	27 February 1981 (aged 20)	2000	(Republic of Ireland) St Patrick's Athletic
(England) Georgie Adams	7 November 1984 (aged 16)	1999	(England) Bushey
(England) Carol Harwood	1 December 1965 (aged 35)	1997	(England) Wembley
(England) Casey Stoney	13 May 1982 (aged 19)	1999	(England) Chelsea
(Republic of Ireland) Susan Heaps	6 January 1981 (aged 20)	2000	(Republic of Ireland) St Catherine's
(England) Jenny Canty	22 March 1976 (aged 25)	1991	(England) Limehouse
(England) Sarah Woolliscroft	24 December 1974 (aged 26)	1999	(England) Ilkeston Town
(England) Kelley Few	17 October 1971 (aged 29)	1991	(England) Romford
Midfielders
(Wales) Jayne Ludlow	7 January 1979 (aged 22)	2000	(England) Southampton Saints
(England) Sian Williams (c)	2 February 1968 (aged 33)	1990	(England) Millwall Lionesses
(Republic of Ireland) Ciara Grant	17 May 1978 (aged 23)	1998	(Republic of Ireland) St Patrick's Athletic
(England) Emma Coss	9 May 1979 (aged 22)	1992	(England) Arsenal Academy
(Republic of Ireland) Carol Conlon	9 January 1979 (aged 21)	1998	(Republic of Ireland) St Patrick's Athletic
(Republic of Ireland) Caroline Thorpe	2 August 1981 (aged 19)	2000	(Republic of Ireland) St Catherine's
(England) Leanne Small	29 September 1982 (aged 18)	2000	(England) Watford
(Scotland) Holly Roberts		1999	(England) Arsenal Academy
(England) Jo Gardiner		1999	(England) Arsenal Academy
Forwards
(England) Angela Banks	23 December 1974 (aged 26)	1999	(England) Whitehawk
(England) Ellen Maggs	16 February 1983 (aged 18)	1997	(England) Arsenal Academy
(England) Alex Scott	14 October 1984 (aged 16)	2000	(England) Arsenal Academy
(England) Marieanne Spacey	13 February 1966 (aged 35)	1993	(England) Wimbledon
(England) Sheuneen Ta	21 July 1985 (aged 15)	1997	(England) Arsenal Academy
(Republic of Ireland) Grainne Kierans	20 September 1978 (aged 22)	1999	(Republic of Ireland) St Patrick's Athletic
(England) Nina Downham	31 December 1980 (aged 20)	1998	(England) Millwall Lionesses
(England) Mikaela Howell	12 July 1988 (aged 12)	1999	(England) Southampton Women
(Japan) Megumi Ogawa	18 March 1980 (aged 21)	2000	(England) Arsenal Academy

=== Appearances and goals ===
Name	PLND		FA Cup		PL Cup		LC Cup		Charity Shield		Total	
Name	Apps	Goals	Apps	Goals	Apps	Goals	Apps	Goals	Apps	Goals	Apps	Goals
Goalkeepers
(Republic of Ireland) Emma Byrne	18	0	5	0	5	0	1	0	1	0	30	0
(England) Jasmine Cripps	0	0	0	0	0	0	0	0	0	0	0	0
(England) Toni-Anne Wayne	0	0	0	0	0	0	0+1	0	0	0	0+1	0
(England) Lesley Higgs	0+4	0	0+1	0	0+2	0	2	0	0+1	0	2+8	0
(England) Aman Dosanj	0	0	0	0	0	0	0	0	0	0	0	0
Defenders
(England) Kirsty Pealling	11	1	4	0	4	0	1	0	1	0	21	1
(Scotland) Pauline MacDonald	6+3	0	1+2	0	0+1	0	0	0	0	0	7+6	0
(England) Faye White	15	4	4	0	4	0	0	0	1	0	24	4
(England) Clare Wheatley	17	3	5	0	5	0	1	0	1	0	29	3
(Republic of Ireland) Yvonne Tracy	2+4	0	0	0	0	0	2	0	0	0	4+6	0
(England) Carol Harwood	16+1	0	5	0	5	0	1	0	0+1	0	27+2	0
(England) Kelley Few	0+1	0	0	0	0+1	0	2	0	1	0	3+2	0
(England) Casey Stoney	15+2	0	5	0	5	0	2	0	1	0	27+2	0
(England) Sarah Woolliscroft	6+6	2	1+3	0	2+3	1	2+1	1	0	0	10+12	4
(Republic of Ireland) Susan Heaps	0+1	0	0	0	0	0	2+1	0	0	0	2+2	0
(England) Jenny Canty	0	0	0	0	0	0	2	0	0	0	2	0
Midfielders
(Wales) Jayne Ludlow	17	20	5	5	5	3	1	0	1	0	29	28
(England) Sian Williams (c)	18	1	5	0	5	0	1	0	1	0	30	1
(Republic of Ireland) Ciara Grant	18	8	5	4	5	2	1	0	1	0	30	14
(England) Emma Coss	0	0	0	0	0	0	2	0	0	0	2	0
(Republic of Ireland) Carol Conlon	0	0	0	0	0	0	0	0	0	0	0	0
(Republic of Ireland) Caroline Thorpe	2+9	3	0+2	0	0+3	2	3	2	0	0	5+14	7
(England) Leanne Small	0	0	0	0	0	0	0	0	0	0	0	0
(Scotland) Holly Roberts	0	0	0	0	0	0	0	0	0	0	0	0
(England) Jo Gardiner	0	0	0	0	0	0	0+1	0	0	0	0+1	0
Forwards
(England) Angela Banks	18	30	5	6	5	8	0	0	1	0	29	44
(England) Ellen Maggs	1+6	1	0+4	1	0+3	0	3	5	0+1	0	4+14	7
(England) Alex Scott	0	0	0	0	0	0	0+2	0	0	0	0+2	0
(Japan) Megumi Ogawa	0+2	0	0	0	0	0	1	0	0	0	1+2	0
(England) Marianne Spacey	18	14	5	4	5	4	0	0	1	1	29	23
(England) Sheuneen Ta	0	0	0	0	0	0	0+1	0	0	0	0+1	0
(Republic of Ireland) Grainne Kierans	0	0	0+1	0	0	0	1	0	0	0	1+1	0
(England) Nina Downham	0	0	0	0	0	0	2	3	0	0	2	3
(England) Mikaela Howell	0	0	0	0	0	0	0	0	0	0	0	0

=== Goalscorers ===
Rank	Position	Name	PLND	FA Cup	PL Cup	LC Cup	Comm Shield	Total
1	FW	(England) Angela Banks	30	6	8	0	0	44
2	MF	(Wales) Jayne Ludlow	20	5	3	0	0	28
3	FW	(England) Marianne Spacey	14	4	4	0	1	23
4	MF	(Republic of Ireland) Ciara Grant	8	4	2	0	0	14
5	FW	(England) Ellen Maggs	1	1	0	5	0	7
5	MF	(Republic of Ireland) Caroline Thorpe	3	0	2	2	0	7
7	DF	(England) Sarah Woolliscroft	2	0	1	1	0	4
7	DF	(England) Faye White	4	0	0	0	0	4
9	FW	(England) Nina Downham	0	0	0	3	0	3
9	DF	(England) Clare Wheatley	3	0	0	0	0	3
11	DF	(England) Kirsty Pealling	1	0	0	0	0	1
Own goal			2	0	0	0	0	2
Total			88	20	20	11	1	139

=== Clean sheets ===
Rank	Name	PLND	FA Cup	PL Cup	LC Cup	Charity Shield	Total
1	(Republic of Ireland) Emma Byrne	9	4	3	1	0	17
2	(England) Lesley Higgs	0	0	0	1	0	1
Total		9	4	3	2	0	18

== Transfers, loans and other signings ==
=== Transfers in ===
Announcement date	Position	Player	From club
August 2000	DF	(Republic of Ireland) Susan Heaps	(Republic of Ireland) St Catherine's
August 2000	MF	(Republic of Ireland) Caroline Thorpe	(Republic of Ireland) St Catherine's
August 2000	DF	(Republic of Ireland) Yvonne Tracy	(Republic of Ireland) St Patrick's Athletic
2000	MF	(England) Leanne Small	(England) Watford
2000	MF	(Wales) Jayne Ludlow	(England) Southampton Saints

=== Transfers out ===
Announcement date	Position	Player	To club
2000	FW	(England) Rachel Yankey	(England) Fulham
2000	DF	(England) Kirsty Hewitson	(England) Southampton Saints
2000	MF	(England) Linda Watt	(England) Barnet
2000	DF	(Republic of Ireland) Tammy Scrivens	(England) Barnet
2000	DF	(England) Vicki Slee	Retired
2000		Kate Baruth	

== Club ==
=== Kit ===
Supplier: Nike / Sponsor: Dreamcast / Sega

Home	Away	Third

== Competitions ==
=== Overall record ===
Competition	First match	Last match	Starting round	Final position	Record							
Competition	First match	Last match	Starting round	Final position	Pld	W	D	L	GF	GA	GD	Win %
FA Women's Premier League National Division	20 August 2000	13 May 2001	Matchday 1	Winners	18	17	1	0	88	9	+79	94.44
FA Women's Cup	7 January 2001	7 May 2001	Fourth round	Winners	5	5	0	0	20	3	+17	100.00
FA Women's Premier League Cup	24 September 2000	1 April 2000	First round	Winners	5	5	0	0	20	2	+18	100.00
FA Women's Charity Shield	6 August 2000		Final	Winners	1	0	1	0	1	1	+0	0.00
London County Cup	29 November 2000	4 March 2001	Quarter-finals	Runners-up	3	2	0	1	11	3	+8	66.67
Total					32	29	2	1	140	18	+122	90.63

Last updated: 24 May 2026
Source: FA WPL

=== FA Women's Charity Shield ===
6 August 2000 Final	Arsenal	1–1	Charlton Athletic	Fulham
15:45 BST	Spacey 22'	Report	Arnold 88'	Stadium: Craven Cottage
Note: Charity Shield was shared between Arsenal and Charlton Athletic

=== FA Women's Premier League National Division ===
==== Partial league table ====
Pos	Team	Pld	W	D	L	GF	GA	GD	Pts	Qualification or relegation
1	Arsenal (C)	18	17	1	0	88	9	+79	52	Qualification for the UEFA Cup qualifying round
2	Doncaster Belles	18	15	0	3	58	13	+45	45	
3	Charlton Athletic (Note: Croydon made a business deal with Charlton Athletic (men's team) and changed the name accordingly.)	18	10	5	3	43	11	+32	35	
4	Everton	18	11	2	5	42	24	+18	35	
5	Tranmere Rovers	18	9	1	8	42	39	+3	28	

Source: FA WPL
(C) Champions

==== Results summary ====
Overall								Home						Away					
Pld	W	D	L	GF	GA	GD	Pts	W	D	L	GF	GA	GD	W	D	L	GF	GA	GD
18	17	1	0	88	9	+79	52	9	0	0	50	4	+46	8	1	0	38	5	+33

==== Results by matchday ====
Matchday	1	2	3	4	5	6	7	8	9	10	11	12	13	14	15	16	17	18
Ground	H	A	H	A	A	A	H	H	H	H	H	A	A	H	A	A	A	H
Result	W	W	W	W	W	D	W	W	W	W	W	W	W	W	W	W	W	W
Position	1	1	1	1	1	1	1	1	1	1	1	1	1	1	1	1	1	1

Source: FA WPL
W = Win; D = Draw; L = Loss

==== Matches ====
20 August 2000 1	Arsenal	5–0	Tranmere Rovers	Borehamwood
14:00 BST	Banks; Ludlow; Thorpe	Report		Stadium: Meadow Park

27 August 2000 2	Everton	1–2	Arsenal	Crosby
12:35 BST	Krivinskas 25'; T. Byrne (yellow card)	Report	Banks 13'; Wheatley 52'	Stadium: Rossett Park; Referee: Ian R. Davies

3 September 2000 3	Arsenal	6–0	Sunderland	Potters Bar
12:00 BST	Banks 5', 60'; Wooliscroft 25'; White 37'; Spacey 64' (pen.); Wheatley 78'	Report		Stadium: The Lantern Stadium

10 September 2000 4	Liverpool	0–10	Arsenal	Fairfield
		Report	Ludlow 6', 78'; Banks; Spacey; Grant; Wheatley	Stadium: Merseyside Police Ground

1 October 2000 5	Southampton Saints	1–9	Arsenal	Totton
	Goal	Report	Banks 1', 9', 24', 50'; Grant; White; Spacey; Ludlow	Stadium: Testwood Stadium

8 October 2000 6	Charlton Athletic	1–1	Arsenal	Northfleet
14:00 BST	Moore 6'	Report	Banks 43'	Stadium: Stonebridge Road; Referee: Ms AK Chapman

15 October 2000 7	Arsenal	2–1	Barry Town	Borehamwood
14:30 BST	Ludlow 71'; Thorpe 76'	Report	70'	Stadium: Meadow Park

25 October 2000 8	Arsenal	10–0	Millwall Lionesses	Borehamwood
	Spacey; Grant; Banks; White; Ludlow	Report		Stadium: Meadow Park

3 December 2000 9	Arsenal	11–0	Liverpool	Borehamwood
14:00 GMT	Banks; Williams; Ludlow; Wheatley; Grant; Maggs	Report		Stadium: Meadow Park

17 December 2000 10	Arsenal	5–0	Charlton Athletic	Borehamwood
14:00 GMT	Pealling 24'; Ludlow 30', 72'; Banks 65'; Wooliscroft	Report		Stadium: Meadow Park

14 January 2001 11	Arsenal	2–1	Everton	Borehamwood
14:00 GMT	Spacey 55', 59'	Report	Britton 13'	Stadium: Meadow Park; Referee: Mr Butterworth

18 March 2001 12	Sunderland	1–3	Arsenal	Durham
12:00 GMT	Twaddle 70'	Report	Ludlow 9'; Spacey 29'; Banks 67'	Stadium: New Ferens Park Stadium

15 April 2001 13	Doncaster Belles	0–1	Arsenal	Woodlands
		Report	Ludlow 84'	Stadium: Welfare Ground

22 April 2001 14	Arsenal	7–1	Southampton Saints	Borehamwood
14:00 BST	Spacey 3' 90'; Ludlow 24', 75'; Banks 54'	Report	Hayes 33'	Stadium: Meadow Park; Referee: Mr I Butterworth

26 April 2001 15	Millwall Lionesses	0–5	Arsenal	Carshalton
19:45 BST		Report	Banks; Ludlow	Stadium: War Memorial Sports Ground; Referee: Wendy Toms (Dorset)

29 April 2001 16	Barry Town	1–3	Arsenal	Barry
	Martyn 17'	Report	Ludlow 5'; Banks 25'; Spacey (penalty missed) 28' 53'	Stadium: Jenner Park Stadium

10 May 2001 17	Tranmere Rovers	0–4	Arsenal	Heswall
		Report	Banks 32', 37', 41'; Grant 45'	Stadium: Gayton Park

13 May 2001 18	Arsenal	2–1	Doncaster Belles	Highbury
	Ludlow; White	Report	Garside 80'	Stadium: Highbury

=== FA Women's Cup ===
7 January 2001 Fourth round	Arsenal	5–3	Leeds United	Borehamwood
14:00 GMT	Grant 12'; Spacey; Ludlow; Maggs	Report	Daniel; Ward; Kelly	Stadium: Meadow Park; Referee: W Savill

11 February 2001 Fifth round	Chelsea	0–10	Arsenal	Beaconsfield
		Report	Spacey (pen.); Ludlow; Grant; Banks	Stadium: Holloways Park; Attendance: 63; Referee: M S Hayward

18 February 2001 Quarter-finals	Arsenal	1–0	Doncaster Belles	Borehamwood
14:00 GMT	Spacey 31'; Ludlow (red card) 35'	Report	Easton (red card) 52'	Stadium: Meadow Park; Referee: I Butterworth

25 March 2001 Semi-finals	Bristol Rovers	0–3	Arsenal	Bristol
15:00 GMT		Report	Banks 65'; Ludlow 70'; Grant 82'	Stadium: The Memorial Ground; Attendance: 3,306; Referee: J Farries (Bicester)

7 May 2001 Final	Arsenal	1–0	Fulham	Selhurst
	Williams (yellow card) 21'; Harwood (yellow card) 49'; Banks 53'	Report	Yankey (yellow card) 27'; Pedersen (yellow card) 47'; Haugenes (penalty missed) 49'; Chapman (yellow card) 57'	Stadium: Selhurst Park; Attendance: 13,824; Referee: T Parkes (Birmingham FA)

=== FA Women's Premier League Cup ===
24 September 2000 First round	Sunderland	0–7	Arsenal
		Report	Banks; Grant; Wooliscroft; Ludlow; Thorpe

5 November 2000 Second round	Arsenal	5–1	Southampton Saints	Borehamwood
14:00 GMT	Ludlow; Banks; Spacey (pen.); Thorpe	Report	Keehan 80'	Stadium: Meadow Park; Referee: J Farries

25 February 2001 Quarter-finals	Doncaster Belles	1–2	Arsenal	Woodlands
	Burke 78' (pen.)	Report	Grant 35'; Spacey 75'	Stadium: Welfare Ground

11 March 2001 Semi-finals	Charlton Athletic	0–3	Arsenal	Northfleet
		Report	Banks 10', 61'; Ludlow 50'	Stadium: Stonebridge Road

1 April 2001 Final	Tranmere Rovers	0–3	Arsenal	Chester
14:30 BST		Report	Spacey 52', 53'; Banks 82'	Stadium: Deva Stadium; Attendance: 2,006; Referee: E.M. Evans (Manchester)

=== London County Cup ===
29 November 2000 Quarter Final	Arsenal	3–0	Millwall Lionesses	Borehamwood
14:00 BST	Maggs	Report		Stadium: Meadow Park; Referee: Mr P Jones

4 March 2001 Semi Final	Arsenal	8–0	Southwark Caribbeans	Potters Bar
	Maggs; Downham; Wooliscroft; Thorpe	Report		Stadium: The Lantern Stadium

25 April 2001 Final	Fulham	3–0	Arsenal	East Molesey
	White 50'; Haugenes 71'; Dinham 90'	Report		Stadium: Imber Court

== See also ==
- List of Arsenal W.F.C. seasons
- 2000–01 in English football
