= 2001 FA Women's Cup final =

2001 FA Women's Cup Final
- The match programme cover
- Event: 2000–01 FA Women's Cup
Arsenal	Fulham
1	0
- Date: 7 May 2001
- Venue: Selhurst Park, London
- Player of the Match: Angela Banks (Arsenal)
- Referee: Trevor Parkes (Birmingham)
- Attendance: 13,824

The 2001 FA Women's Cup Final was the 31st final of the FA Women's Cup, England's primary cup competition for women's football teams. The final event was played between Arsenal and Fulham on 6 May 2001 at Selhurst Park in London. Angela Banks of Arsenal scored the winner. A record 13,824 people attended the match.

== Match details ==
7 May 2001

Arsenal	1–0	Fulham
Banks 53'	Report

Selhurst Park, London
Attendance: 13,824
Referee: Trevor Parkes (Birmingham)

Arsenal	Fulham

GK	1	(Republic of Ireland) Emma Byrne
DF	2	(England) Kirsty Pealling
DF	3	(England) Casey Stoney
DF	5	(England) Carol Harwood	(yellow card) 49'
DF	6	(England) Faye White
DF	11	(England) Clare Wheatley
MF	4	(Wales) Jayne Ludlow
MF	7	(England) Sian Williams (c)	(yellow card) 21'
MF	10	(Republic of Ireland) Ciara Grant
FW	8	(England) Angela Banks
FW	9	(England) Marieanne Spacey		(substituted off) 84'
Substitutes:
GK	13	(England) Lesley Higgs
FW	12	(England) Ellen Maggs	(substituted on) 84'
DF	14	(England) Sarah Wooliscroft
MF	15	(Republic of Ireland) Caroline Thorpe
DF	16	(Republic of Ireland) Yvonne Tracy
Manager:
(England) Vic Akers

GK	1	(England) Jody Bowry
DF	2	(Republic of Ireland) Ronnie Gibbons
DF	3	(England) Kim Jerray-Silver
DF	4	(Denmark) Katrine Pedersen (c)	(yellow card) 47'
DF	5	(England) Mary Phillip
MF	6	(England) Katie Chapman	(yellow card) 57'
MF	7	(England) Sanchia Duncan		(substituted off) 78'
MF	8	(England) Rachel McArthur		(substituted off) 83'
MF	9	(England) Rachel Yankey	(yellow card) 27'
FW	10	(Norway) Margunn Haugenes
FW	11	(Norway) Marianne Pettersen
Substitutes:
FW	12	(England) Deena Rahman		(substituted on) 83'
DF	13	(England) Layla Young
MF	14	(Norway) Lynn Rebecca Mork		(substituted on) 78'
GK	15	(England) Janette Hynes
DF	16	(England) Laveena Betts
Manager:
(England) Frank McMorrow

Player of the match
Angela Banks (Arsenal)

Assistant referees:
Nicola Hare
Debbie Sudlow
Fourth official:
John Farries

Match rules

- 90 minutes.
- 30 minutes of extra-time if necessary.
- Penalty shoot-out if scores still level.
- Five named substitutes.
- Maximum of three substitutions.
