= 2000–01 in English football =

Football in England
- Season: 2000–01

Men's football
- FA Premier League: Manchester United
- First Division: Fulham
- Second Division: Millwall
- Third Division: Brighton & Hove Albion
- Football Conference: Rushden & Diamonds
- FA Cup: Liverpool
- Football League Trophy: Port Vale
- League Cup: Liverpool
- FA Charity Shield: Chelsea

Women's football
- Premier League National Division: Arsenal
- Premier League Northern Division: Leeds United
- Premier League Southern Division: Brighton & Hove Albion
- FA Women's Cup: Arsenal
- Premier League Cup: Arsenal

The 2000–01 season was the 121st season of competitive football in England.

== Overview ==
Manchester United secured their third Premiership title in succession and their seventh title in just nine seasons. Liverpool became only the second English side to win the League Cup and FA Cup in the same season, also adding the UEFA Cup to make it a unique treble.

Fulham reached the Premiership as Division One champions to secure their five-season rise from Division Three. They also became the first club to have played in all four divisions of the English league since the creation of the Premiership.

Luton Town – who had been League Cup winners 13 years prior and top division members until nine years prior – and Oxford United – who had been League Cup winners 15 years earlier and top division members until 13 years prior – were relegated to Division Three.

Mid-table Division Two side Wycombe Wanderers beat all odds by reaching the FA Cup semi-final against Liverpool, beating Division One sides Millwall, Wolverhampton Wanderers, and Wimbledon, as well as Premier League side Leicester City en route to the semis. Wycombe were defeated 2–1 at Villa Park.

== Honours ==
Competition	Winner
FA Premier League	Manchester United
FA Cup	Liverpool
Football League Cup	Liverpool
Football League Trophy	Port Vale
Football League First Division	Fulham
Football League Second Division	Millwall
Football League Third Division	Brighton & Hove Albion
FA Community Shield	Chelsea

== England national team ==
2 September 2000
Friendly

France	1–1	England
Petit 64'		Owen 86'

Stade de France, Saint-Denis
Attendance: 77.000
Referee: Ansuátegui Roca (ESP)

7 October 2000
WCQ (Group 9)

England	0–1	Germany
		Hamann 14'

Wembley Stadium, London
Attendance: 76.377
Referee: Braschi (ITA)

11 October 2000
WCQ (Group 9)

Finland	0–0	England

Olympic Stadium, Helsinki
Attendance: 36.210
Referee: Sars (FRA)

15 November 2000
Friendly

Italy	1–0	England
Gattuso 58'

Stadio Delle Alpi, Turin
Attendance: 22.714
Referee: Puhl (HUN)

28 February 2001
Friendly

England	3–0	Spain
Barmby 38'; Heskey 56'; Ehiogu 70'

Villa Park, Birmingham
Attendance: 42.129
Referee: Vassaras (GRE)

24 March 2001
WCQ (Group 9)

England	2–1	Finland
Owen 44'; Beckham 50'		Riihilahti 26'

Anfield Road, Liverpool
Attendance: 44.262
Referee: Ivanov (RUS)

28 March 2001
WCQ (Group 9)

Albania	1–3	England
Rraklli 90'		Owen 74'; Scholes 85'; Cole 90+1'

Qemal Stafa, Tirana
Attendance: 18.000
Referee: Hamer (LUX)

25 May 2001
Friendly

England	4–0	Mexico
Scholes 3'; Fowler 14'; Beckham 30'; Sheringham 75'

Pride Park, Derby
Attendance: 33.597
Referee: Batista (POR)

6 June 2001
WCQ (Group 9)

Greece	0–2	England
		Scholes 64'; Beckham 87'

Olympic Stadium, Athens
Attendance: 45.000
Referee: Pedersen (NOR)

== League tables ==
=== FA Premier League ===
Manchester United became the fourth team in history to win a third consecutive English league title; in one of the least eventful title races in Premier League history, they went top after seven games and never relinquished their lead, nor looked to be in any danger of doing so. Arsenal likewise never dropped below second place after mid-October, leaving the real drama as who being who would take third spot, and thereby the final Champions League place.

Ultimately, Liverpool finished third and won both domestic cup competitions as well as the UEFA Cup, becoming the first-ever club to win this treble of cups. Leeds United finished fourth, being left to rue a terrible first half of the season that saw them look in danger of being sucked into the relegation fight, but somewhat made up for this with much better form after Christmas and more significantly, a run to the semi-finals of the Champions League.

The biggest surprise of the season came with Ipswich Town, who were newly promoted to the Premiership after five years away and most people's favourites for the drop. Ipswich surprised all the observers by challenging for a place in the top-three and eventually winding up in fifth place, enough to merit UEFA Cup qualification. It was the Suffolk club's highest league finish since 1982. Chelsea took sixth place and thereby the final UEFA Cup spot, as despite the controversial early-season sacking of Gianluca Vialli, the most successful manager in the club's history at that point, they eventually regrouped under new manager Claudio Ranieri.

Newly promoted Charlton Athletic finished an impressive ninth, while Leicester City started the season as unlikely title contenders, but lost nine of their final ten Premiership matches to finish 13th.

Bradford City were the first team to be relegated, having won just five Premiership games all season in their second season after promotion, as an extensive investment in players failed to pay off and would lead to financial troubles in the years ahead. Joining them were Coventry City, whose luck finally ran out after 34 years in the top flight; a late upturn in form seemed to herald another of the Sky Blues' dramatic escapes from relegation, but a run of only one point from their last games proved fatal. Manchester City occupied the final relegation spot; while they started the season respectably well, they only won four matches after the start of November, making this the fifth time in six seasons that they were either promoted or relegated.

Pos	Team	Pld	W	D	L	GF	GA	GD	Pts	Qualification or relegation
1	Manchester United (C)	38	24	8	6	79	31	+48	80	Qualification for the Champions League first group stage
2	Arsenal	38	20	10	8	63	38	+25	70	Qualification for the Champions League first group stage
3	Liverpool	38	20	9	9	71	39	+32	69	Qualification for the Champions League third qualifying round (Note: Since Liverpool won the League Cup and qualified for the Champions League, their UEFA Cup place went to fifth-placed Ipswich Town. Since both FA Cup finalists, Liverpool and Arsenal, qualified for the Champions League, the berth in the UEFA Cup went to sixth-placed Chelsea. Both Ipswich and Chelsea were the highest-ranked team not already qualified for a European competition.)
4	Leeds United	38	20	8	10	64	43	+21	68	Qualification for the UEFA Cup first round
5	Ipswich Town	38	20	6	12	57	42	+15	66	Qualification for the UEFA Cup first round
6	Chelsea	38	17	10	11	68	45	+23	61	Qualification for the UEFA Cup first round
7	Sunderland	38	15	12	11	46	41	+5	57	
8	Aston Villa	38	13	15	10	46	43	+3	54	Qualification for the Intertoto Cup third round
9	Charlton Athletic	38	14	10	14	50	57	−7	52	
10	Southampton	38	14	10	14	40	48	−8	52	
11	Newcastle United	38	14	9	15	44	50	−6	51	Qualification for the Intertoto Cup third round
12	Tottenham Hotspur	38	13	10	15	47	54	−7	49	
13	Leicester City	38	14	6	18	39	51	−12	48	
14	Middlesbrough	38	9	15	14	44	44	0	42	
15	West Ham United	38	10	12	16	45	50	−5	42	
16	Everton	38	11	9	18	45	59	−14	42	
17	Derby County	38	10	12	16	37	59	−22	42	
18	Manchester City (R)	38	8	10	20	41	65	−24	34	Relegation to the Football League First Division
19	Coventry City (R)	38	8	10	20	36	63	−27	34	Relegation to the Football League First Division
20	Bradford City (R)	38	5	11	22	30	70	−40	26	Relegation to the Football League First Division

Source: Premier League
Rules for classification: 1) points; 2) goal difference; 3) number of goals scored.
(C) Champions; (R) Relegated
Notes:

Leading goalscorer: Jimmy Floyd Hasselbaink (Chelsea) – 23

=== Football League First Division ===
Under the management of Jean Tigana, but with only two changes to the previous season's first team, Fulham won the division easily. Blackburn Rovers managed to edge close rivals Bolton Wanderers to the automatic promotion spot, though their rivalry would continue the following season as Bolton defeated Preston North End (another set of close rivals) in the playoffs.

Burnley's seventh-place finish put them just one place short of the playoffs and the chance of ending their 25-year absence from the top flight. Wimbledon finished eighth in their first season outside the top flight for 15 years. Watford faltered to finish ninth after a strong start to the season suggested that they would win promotion back to the Premier League, prompting the resignation of Graham Taylor as manager and the appointment of Gianluca Vialli in his place.

Tranmere's recent cup successes failed to translate into league form, and they finished bottom, just behind Queens Park Rangers, who fell into the third tier for the first time since the 1960s. An unlikely series of results in the final few weeks sent Huddersfield down to Division Two, when they had looked safe at the start of April. Narrowly avoiding relegation were Crystal Palace, whose dramatic last day victory over Stockport ensured survival for a club who spent the previous two seasons struggling with a financial crisis.

Pos	Team	Pld	W	D	L	GF	GA	GD	Pts	Qualification or relegation
1	Fulham (C, P)	46	30	11	5	90	32	+58	101	Promotion to the Premier League
2	Blackburn Rovers (P)	46	26	13	7	76	39	+37	91	Promotion to the Premier League
3	Bolton Wanderers (O, P)	46	24	15	7	76	45	+31	87	Qualification for the First Division play-offs
4	Preston North End	46	23	9	14	64	52	+12	78	Qualification for the First Division play-offs
5	Birmingham City	46	23	9	14	59	48	+11	78	Qualification for the First Division play-offs
6	West Bromwich Albion	46	21	11	14	60	52	+8	74	Qualification for the First Division play-offs
7	Burnley	46	21	9	16	50	54	−4	72	
8	Wimbledon	46	17	18	11	71	50	+21	69	
9	Watford	46	20	9	17	76	67	+9	69	
10	Sheffield United	46	19	11	16	52	49	+3	68	
11	Nottingham Forest	46	20	8	18	55	53	+2	68	
12	Wolverhampton Wanderers	46	14	13	19	45	48	−3	55	
13	Gillingham	46	13	16	17	61	66	−5	55	
14	Crewe Alexandra	46	15	10	21	47	62	−15	55	
15	Norwich City	46	14	12	20	46	58	−12	54	
16	Barnsley	46	15	9	22	49	62	−13	54	
17	Sheffield Wednesday	46	15	8	23	52	71	−19	53	
18	Grimsby Town	46	14	10	22	43	62	−19	52	
19	Stockport County	46	11	18	17	58	65	−7	51	
20	Portsmouth	46	10	19	17	47	59	−12	49	
21	Crystal Palace	46	12	13	21	57	70	−13	49	
22	Huddersfield Town (R)	46	11	15	20	48	57	−9	48	Relegation to the Second Division
23	Queens Park Rangers (R)	46	7	19	20	45	75	−30	40	Relegation to the Second Division
24	Tranmere Rovers (R)	46	9	11	26	46	77	−31	38	Relegation to the Second Division

Rules for classification: 1) Points; 2) Goal difference; 3) Goals scored
(C) Champions; (O) Play-off winners; (P) Promoted; (R) Relegated

Leading goalscorer: Louis Saha (Fulham) – 27

=== Football League Second Division ===
Millwall, who had failed to impress since relegation from the First Division in 1996, finally secured promotion as divisional champions. Making perhaps bigger headlines were unfashionable Rotherham United, who instead of struggling as the pundits predicted, took the second automatic promotion spot, pushing Millwall perilously close for the title. Walsall recovered from the previous year's last-day relegation and won the playoffs.

Oxford finished bottom of the table by some distance, never looking as if they would survive and setting a number of unwanted records for the division. Swansea – who had beaten Rotherham to the Division Three title the previous season – proved almost as bad as Oxford, with their survival hopes being little better. Much was expected of Luton following massive pre-season overhauls both on and off the pitch; unfortunately their season ended in crushing disappointment, and relegation. Bristol Rovers occupied the final relegation spot, entering the League's bottom tier for the first time in their history. Swindon narrowly avoided a second successive relegation.

Pos	Team	Pld	W	D	L	GF	GA	GD	Pts	Qualification or relegation
1	Millwall (C, P)	46	28	9	9	89	38	+51	93	Promotion to Football League First Division
2	Rotherham United (P)	46	27	10	9	79	55	+24	91	Promotion to Football League First Division
3	Reading	46	25	11	10	86	52	+34	86	Qualification for the Second Division play-offs
4	Walsall (O, P)	46	23	12	11	79	50	+29	81	Qualification for the Second Division play-offs
5	Stoke City	46	21	14	11	74	49	+25	77	Qualification for the Second Division play-offs
6	Wigan Athletic	46	19	18	9	53	42	+11	75	Qualification for the Second Division play-offs
7	Bournemouth	46	20	13	13	79	55	+24	73	
8	Notts County	46	19	12	15	62	66	−4	69	
9	Bristol City	46	18	14	14	70	56	+14	68	
10	Wrexham	46	17	12	17	65	71	−6	63	
11	Port Vale	46	16	14	16	55	49	+6	62	
12	Peterborough United	46	15	14	17	61	66	−5	59	
13	Wycombe Wanderers	46	15	14	17	46	53	−7	59	
14	Brentford	46	14	17	15	56	70	−14	59	
15	Oldham Athletic	46	15	13	18	53	65	−12	58	
16	Bury	46	16	10	20	45	59	−14	58	
17	Colchester United	46	15	12	19	55	59	−4	57	
18	Northampton Town	46	15	12	19	46	59	−13	57	
19	Cambridge United	46	14	11	21	61	77	−16	53	
20	Swindon Town	46	13	13	20	47	65	−18	52	
21	Bristol Rovers (R)	46	12	15	19	53	57	−4	51	Relegation to Football League Third Division
22	Luton Town (R)	46	9	13	24	52	80	−28	40	Relegation to Football League Third Division
23	Swansea City (R)	46	8	13	25	47	73	−26	37	Relegation to Football League Third Division
24	Oxford United (R)	46	7	6	33	53	100	−47	27	Relegation to Football League Third Division

Rules for classification: 1) Points; 2) Goal difference; 3) Goals scored
(C) Champions; (O) Play-off winners; (P) Promoted; (R) Relegated

Leading goalscorer: Jamie Cureton (Reading) and Neil Harris (Millwall), 27

=== Football League Third Division ===
After their financial nightmares and near-relegations of the previous years, Brighton finally started making serious progress, as they won the title. Chesterfield would have taken the runners-up spot; however, financial irregularities resulted in a nine-point deduction, handing second place to Cardiff instead, though Chesterfield still took the final automatic promotion spot. Blackpool sneaked into the playoffs near the end of the season, then proceeded to win them, ensuring that their spell in Division Three was a short one.

A number of teams were threatened with relegation during the course of the season. However, in the end, Barnet – who moved long-serving manager John Still upstairs to make way for the higher-profile appointment of Tony Cottee early in the season – suffered a stunning collapse after a bright start, leading to a "winner takes all, loser stands small" match with Torquay on the final day of the season. Torquay won the match and ensured League survival, while Barnet returned to the Conference after a decade in the league. Carlisle endured a third successive relegation battle and were successful once again.

Pos	Team	Pld	W	D	L	GF	GA	GD	Pts	Qualification or relegation
1	Brighton & Hove Albion (C, P)	46	28	8	10	73	35	+38	92	Promotion to Football League Second Division
2	Cardiff City (P)	46	23	13	10	95	58	+37	82	Promotion to Football League Second Division
3	Chesterfield (P)	46	25	14	7	79	42	+37	80 (Note: Chesterfield had 9 points deducted.)	Promotion to Football League Second Division
4	Hartlepool United	46	21	14	11	71	54	+17	77	Qualification for the Third Division play-offs
5	Leyton Orient	46	20	15	11	59	51	+8	75	Qualification for the Third Division play-offs
6	Hull City	46	19	17	10	47	39	+8	74	Qualification for the Third Division play-offs
7	Blackpool (O, P)	46	22	6	18	74	58	+16	72	Qualification for the Third Division play-offs
8	Rochdale	46	18	17	11	59	48	+11	71	
9	Cheltenham Town	46	18	14	14	59	52	+7	68	
10	Scunthorpe United	46	18	11	17	62	52	+10	65	
11	Southend United	46	15	18	13	55	53	+2	63	
12	Plymouth Argyle	46	15	13	18	54	61	−7	58	
13	Mansfield Town	46	15	13	18	64	72	−8	58	
14	Macclesfield Town	46	14	14	18	51	62	−11	56	
15	Shrewsbury Town	46	15	10	21	49	65	−16	55	
16	Kidderminster Harriers	46	13	14	19	47	61	−14	53	
17	York City	46	13	13	20	42	63	−21	52	
18	Lincoln City	46	12	15	19	58	66	−8	51	
19	Exeter City	46	12	14	20	40	58	−18	50	
20	Darlington	46	12	13	21	44	56	−12	49	
21	Torquay United	46	12	13	21	52	77	−25	49	
22	Carlisle United	46	11	15	20	42	65	−23	48	
23	Halifax Town	46	12	11	23	54	68	−14	47	
24	Barnet (R)	46	12	9	25	67	81	−14	45	Relegation to Football Conference

Rules for classification: 1) Points; 2) Goal difference; 3) Goals scored
(C) Champions; (O) Play-off winners; (P) Promoted; (R) Relegated
Notes:

Leading goalscorer: Bobby Zamora (Brighton & Hove Albion), 28

Note: Cardiff City left administration and made arrangements before promotion as runner up and Chesterfield deducted 9 points for beginning financial irregularities.

== European qualifiers ==
=== UEFA Champions League ===
==== Group phase ====
- Manchester United
- Arsenal

==== Qualifying round ====
- Liverpool

=== UEFA Cup ===
- Leeds United
- Ipswich Town
- Chelsea

== Promoted teams ==
From Division One to the Premier League:

Fulham
Blackburn Rovers
Bolton Wanderers

From Division Two to Division One:

Millwall
Rotherham United
Walsall

From Division Three to Division Two:

Brighton & Hove Albion
Cardiff City
Chesterfield
Blackpool

From The Football Conference to Division Three:

Rushden & Diamonds

== Relegated teams ==
From the Premier League to Division One:

Manchester City
Coventry City
Bradford City

From Division One to Division Two:

Huddersfield Town
Queens Park Rangers
Tranmere Rovers

From Division Two to Division Three:

Bristol Rovers
Luton Town
Swansea City
Oxford United

From Division Three to The Football Conference:

Barnet

== Women's football ==
=== Women's Premier League ===
==== National Division ====
Pos	Team	Pld	W	D	L	GF	GA	GD	Pts	Qualification or relegation
1	Arsenal (C)	18	17	1	0	88	9	+79	52	Qualification for the UEFA Cup qualifying round
2	Doncaster Belles	18	15	0	3	58	13	+45	45	
3	Charlton Athletic (Note: Croydon made a business deal with Charlton Athletic (men's team) and changed the name accordingly.)	18	10	5	3	43	11	+32	35	
4	Everton	18	11	2	5	42	24	+18	35	
5	Tranmere Rovers	18	9	1	8	42	39	+3	28	
6	Barry Town (Note: Barry Town's men's team played in the Wales league pyramid, but the women's team was part of the English league pyramid.)	18	7	2	9	22	40	−18	23	
7	Sunderland	18	5	1	12	29	50	−21	16	
8	Southampton Saints	18	3	6	9	28	52	−24	15	
9	Millwall Lionesses (R)	18	3	2	13	17	55	−38	11	Relegation to the Southern Division
10	Liverpool (R)	18	0	0	18	13	89	−76	0	Relegation to the Northern Division

Source: FA WPL
(C) Champions; (R) Relegated

==== Northern Division ====
Pos	Team	Pld	W	D	L	GF	GA	GD	Pts	Promotion or relegation
1	Leeds United (C, P)	22	18	2	2	75	18	+57	56	Promotion to the National Division
2	Oldham Curzon	22	17	2	3	61	25	+36	53	
3	Aston Villa	22	12	5	5	52	37	+15	41	
4	Bangor City	22	10	7	5	43	27	+16	37	
5	Wolverhampton Wanderers	22	12	1	9	47	42	+5	37	
6	Birmingham City	22	9	5	8	50	42	+8	32	
7	Ilkeston Town	22	8	5	9	39	39	0	29	
8	Garswood Saints	22	8	1	13	41	60	−19	25	
9	Sheffield Wednesday	22	7	3	12	30	53	−23	24	
10	Coventry City	22	4	5	13	23	48	−25	17	
11	Newcastle Town (R)	22	4	3	15	28	62	−34	15	Relegation to the Midland Combination League
12	Huddersfield Town (R)	22	3	1	18	15	51	−36	10	Relegation to the Northern Combination League

Source: FA WPL
(C) Champions; (P) Promoted; (R) Relegated

==== Southern Division ====
Pos	Team	Pld	W	D	L	GF	GA	GD	Pts	Promotion or relegation
1	Brighton & Hove Albion (C, P)	22	18	2	2	56	15	+41	56	Promotion to the National Division
2	Chelsea	22	17	4	1	66	26	+40	55	
3	Wimbledon	22	15	2	5	56	31	+25	47	
4	Barnet	22	13	3	6	66	33	+33	42	
5	Langford	22	12	3	7	47	30	+17	39	
6	Ipswich Town	22	8	3	11	47	57	−10	27	
7	Berkhamsted Town	22	8	1	13	40	51	−11	25	
8	Barking	22	8	0	14	52	54	−2	24	
9	Newport County	22	7	2	13	33	44	−11	23	
10	Wembley Mill Hill	22	6	2	14	35	64	−29	20	
11	Cardiff City (R)	22	6	0	16	34	60	−26	18	Relegation to the South West Combination League
12	Reading Royals (R)	22	2	2	18	25	92	−67	8	Relegation to the South West Combination League

Source: FA WPL
(C) Champions; (P) Promoted; (R) Relegated

=== FA Women's Cup ===
==== Final ====
7 May 2001

Arsenal	1–0	Fulham
Banks 54'	Report

Selhurst Park, London
Attendance: 13,824
Referee: T Parkes (Birmingham)

== Major transfer deals ==
=== 2000 ===
- 3 July – Robert Pires from Marseille to Arsenal, £6m
- 3 July – Carlo Cudicini from Castel di Sangro to Chelsea
- 17 July – Paul Gascoigne from Middlesbrough to Everton, free
- 18 July – Nick Barmby from Everton to Liverpool, £6m
- 21 July – Mark Viduka from Celtic to Leeds United, £6m
- 25 July – Julio Arca from Argentinos Juniors to Sunderland, £3.5m
- 28 July – Alpay Özalan from Fenerbahçe to Aston Villa, £5.6m
- 17 August – Craig Bellamy from Norwich City to Coventry City, £6.5m
- 25 August – Christian Ziege from Middlesbrough to Liverpool, £5.5m
- 26 August – Sylvain Wiltord from Bordeaux to Arsenal, £13m
- 20 September – Ugo Ehiogu from Aston Villa to Middlesbrough, £8m
- 26 October – Rio Ferdinand from West Ham United to Leeds United, £18m
- 7 December – Igor Bišćan from Dinamo Zagreb to Liverpool, £5.5m
- 29 December – Jesper Grønkjær from Ajax to Chelsea, £7.8m

=== 2001 ===
- 13 January – Juan Pablo Ángel from River Plate to Aston Villa, £9.5m
- 16 January – Edu from Corinthians to Arsenal, £6m
- 21 May – Robbie Keane from Inter Milan to Leeds United, £12m
- 14 June – Frank Lampard from West Ham United to Chelsea, £11m
- 17 June – Corrado Grabbi from Ternana to Blackburn Rovers, £6.75m

== Famous debutants ==
- After failing to break into the Tottenham Hotspur side, Peter Crouch, 19, makes his league debut for new club Queens Park Rangers in a goalless draw with Birmingham City on the opening day of the season.
- The same weekend sees future England teammate Joleon Lescott, play for Wolverhampton Wanderers in their draw with Sheffield Wednesday shortly before his 18th birthday.
- Seventeen-year-old Jermain Defoe scores the only goal of the game as West Ham United win 1–0 at Walsall in the League Cup in August 2000.

== Retirements ==
3 August 2000: Pierluigi Casiraghi, 31-year-old Italian striker, retires nearly two years after he broke his leg in a Premier League match for Chelsea and failed to make a full recovery.

28 September 2000: Steve Bould, 37-year-old central defender, retires after just over a year at Sunderland, having joined them after 11 years at Arsenal where he formed part of one of the most successful defence line-ups of modern times.

8 November 2000: Robbie Earle, 35-year-old Wimbledon and Jamaica midfielder, retires due to a stomach injury.

24 January 2001: Luc Nilis, 33-year-old Belgian striker, retires on medical advice four months after suffering a badly broken leg while playing for Aston Villa against Ipswich Town.

4 May 2001: Dave Watson, 39-year-old central defender, finally retires from playing after 15 years with Everton after accepting an offer to manage Tranmere Rovers.

9 May 2001: Tony Cottee, 35-year-old striker, retires after a brief spell at Millwall during their Division Two promotion run-in.

4 July 2001: Gary Pallister, 36-year-old central defender, retires after 17 years in professional football after three years back at Middlesbrough, who gave him his Football League break when he began his first spell with them in 1984. His biggest successes came at Manchester United between 1989 and 1998, where he won four league titles, three FA Cups, a Football League Cup and the European Cup Winners' Cup. He was also capped 22 times by England between 1988 and 1996.

== Deaths ==
- 8 July 2000: Cliff Sear, 63, took much of the credit for helping develop the career of Ian Rush from his work with the Chester youth set-up in the late 1970s. His 19-year association with Chester (1968–87) also included a spells as manager and player. The former Welsh international had earlier played for Manchester City and later worked for Wrexham.
- 29 July 2000: Benny Fenton, 81, played 409 league games at wing-half between 1937 and 1958 for West Ham United, Millwall, Charlton Athletic and Colchester United. He served Colchester United for eight years as manager, before a year-long spell in charge of Orient before returning to Millwall as manager in 1966 and remaining in charge of the club for eight years until 1974.
- 18 August 2000: Maurice Evans, 63, died of a heart attack. He had managed Reading to the Fourth Division championship in 1979 and most famously took charge of Oxford United during their three-year spell in the top flight (1985–88). Guided them to League Cup glory in 1986. Was sacked in March 1988 as they were heading for relegation to the Second Division, but was later employed at the club as caretaker manager (during the autumn of 1993) and then as Director of Football.
- 29 August 2000: Willie Maddren, 49, played 293 league games in defence for his only club, Middlesbrough, between 1969 and 1977 before a knee injury cut his playing career short at the age of 26. He officially retired as a player in 1979, returning to the Teesside club as physiotherapist in 1982 before being promoted to the manager's seat in March 1984. Although his time as manager at the club was difficult due to the club's financial difficulties and a loss in form which pushed them towards relegation to the Third Division in 1986 (costing him his job), he built a significant part of the side which would win two successive promotions under his successor Bruce Rioch. Maddren then enjoyed success with his own sports trophy business before being diagnosed with motor neuron disease in 1995, the illness claiming his life after five years.
- 23 October 2000: Doug Millward, 69, played 143 league games as a forward for Ipswich Town under Alf Ramsey between 1955 and 1963, scoring 35 goals and being part of their title winning team in 1962. Became manager of St Mirren in Scotland in 1965 before furthering his career to the USA a year later and staying there until his death.
- 1 November 2000: George Armstrong, 56, died of a stroke at Arsenal's training ground where he had been coaching the club's reserve side. He had been a key player in their 1971 double triumph.
- 10 November 2000: Bob Matthewson, 70, played three league games for Bolton Wanderers in the early postwar years before moving into refereeing. He refereed many top matches, including the 1974 FA Charity Shield (in which he sent off Kevin Keegan and Billy Bremner for fighting) and the 1977 FA Cup Final.
- 7 February 2001: Marc North, 34, who died of cancer, started his career as a striker for Luton Town, making 18 First Division appearances in the mid-1980s and scoring three goals. He signed for Grimsby Town in 1987 and spent two years at Blundell Park, memorably scoring twice as a substitute in a surprise FA Cup tie victory over Middlesbrough as well as scoring 17 goals in 67 league games before his move to Leicester City in 1989. He was transferred back to Grimsby in 1991 but left a year later after just one league appearance, with back injuries taking their toll and ending his senior career at the age of 26, although he continued to play at non-league level until 1999.
- 28 February 2001: Stan Cullis, 85, manager of Wolverhampton Wanderers from 1947 to 1964, having previously been on the club's playing staff. Won three league championships and two FA Cups. Was Birmingham City manager from 1965 until 1970. During the early 1990s redevelopment of the Molineux, a new stand was named in honour of Stan Cullis.
- 30 March 2001: George Mutch, 88, Aberdeen born inside-forward, signed for Manchester United in 1934 and collected a Second Division title medal in 1936, managing 46 goals in 112 league games for the club before his transfer to Preston North End in 1937. He scored the last-minute winning penalty for the Deepdale side in their 1938 FA Cup final triumph, but his chances of further success were sabotaged by the outbreak of World War II a year later. He continued his career after the war with Bury and finally Southport. His solitary cap for Scotland came in 1938.
- 31 March 2001: David Rocastle, 33, who won two league championships and one League Cup with Arsenal (where he played from 1983 until 1992), died of cancer. He played 14 times for England without scoring, but was never on the losing side. He later played for Leeds United, Manchester City, Chelsea, Norwich City, Hull City and Malaysian side Sabah before retiring in 1999. His nine-year-old son Ryan was Arsenal's mascot at the FA Cup final just six weeks after Rocastle senior's death.
- 8 April 2001: Dennis Roberts, 83, played 306 league games at centre-half for Bristol City between 1938 and 1954.
- 9 June 2001: Ronnie Allen, 72, had an illustrious career as a forward for Port Vale, West Bromwich Albion and Crystal Palace between 1946 and 1965, scoring 276 goals (208 of them for Albion). He was capped five times by England during the 1950s, scoring twice, and collected an FA Cup winner's medal in 1954 with Albion. He moved into management with Wolverhampton Wanderers in 1966, guiding the club to promotion a year later and later taking charge of Atletico Bilbao, Sporting CP, Walsall, West Bromwich Albion (twice), and Greek side Panathinaikos. His final contribution to management came in 1981–82 with his second spell in charge of Albion, where they reached the semi-finals of both domestic cups, but narrowly avoided relegation from the top flight a year after finishing fourth under his predecessor Ron Atkinson. He remained at Albion on the coaching and scouting staff until 1996, and his death came after a struggle with Alzheimer's disease.
- 30 June 2001: Joe Fagan, 80, was a long-serving coach at Liverpool when he succeeded Bob Paisley as manager in 1983. In his first season they won a unique treble of the league championship, League Cup and European Cup, but his last season ended trophyless after they lost 1–0 to Juventus in the European Cup final at Heysel – the infamous game at which the Heysel Stadium disaster claimed the lives of 39 spectators.
