= Faye White =

English footballer (born 1978)

Faye White MBE
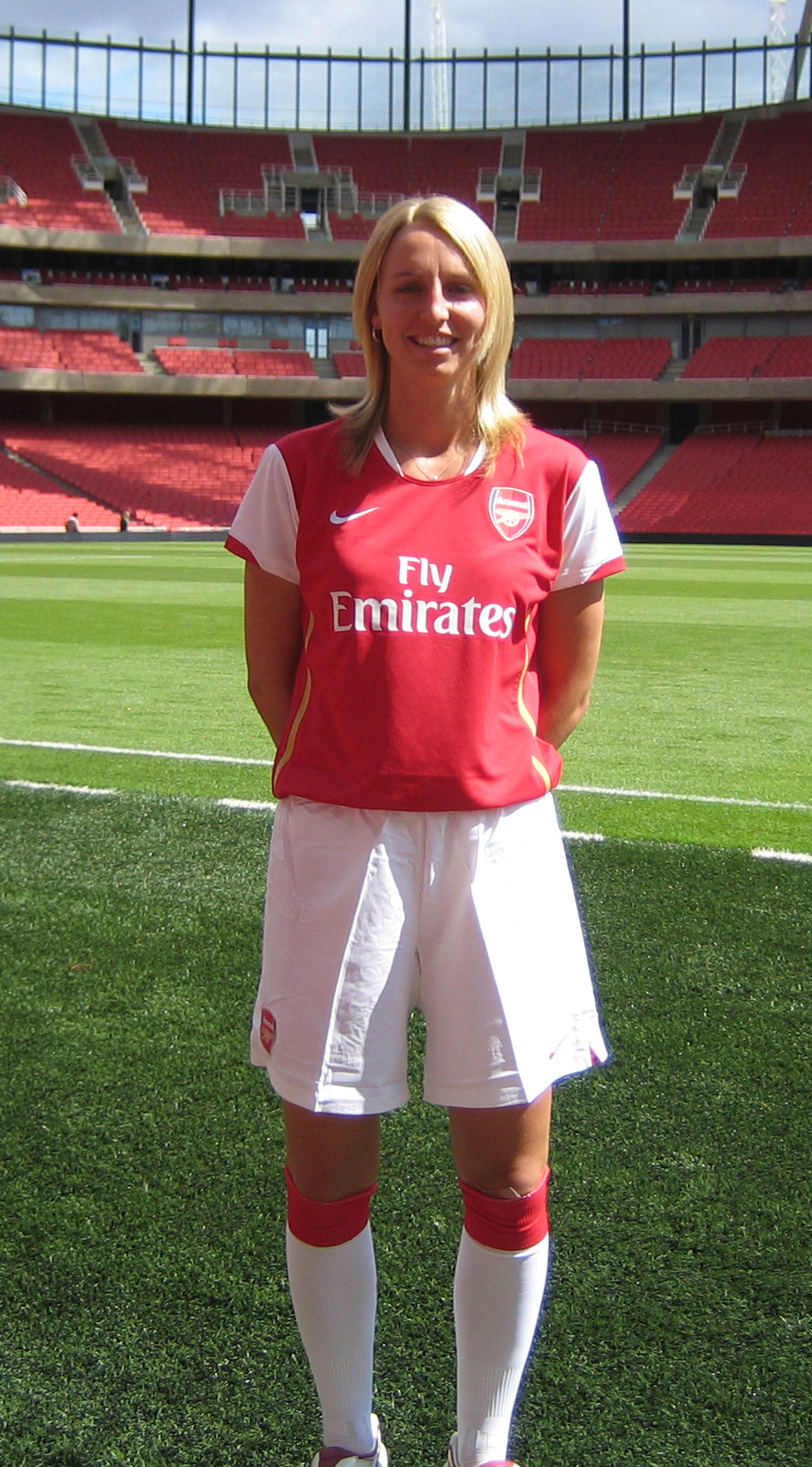
- Faye White at the Emirates Stadium, London, August 2006

Personal information
- Full name: Faye Deborah White
- Date of birth: 2 February 1978 (age 48)
- Place of birth: Horley, England
- Height: 6 ft 0 in (1.83 m)
- Position: Defender

Youth career
- Horsham

Senior career*
Years	Team	Apps	(Gls)
1996–2013	Arsenal	300	(22)
2007	→ Ottawa Fury (loan)	8	(1)

International career^{‡}
1997–2011	England	90	(12)
- * Club domestic league appearances and goals as of 20:39, 7 March 2011 (GMT) ‡ National team caps and goals as of 9 July 2011

Faye Deborah White, MBE (born 2 February 1978) is an English former footballer who captained Arsenal Women in the FA Women's Super League and is the longest-serving female captain of England to date. Her Lionesses career spanned 15 years and five major tournament finals - a record four as captain. A UEFA Women's Champions League winner, she won both League titles and the FA Cup across three different decades with Arsenal. White was recognised for services to Sport in the Queen's New Year's Honours List 2007, being appointed a Member of the Order of the British Empire In recognition of her achievements she was inducted into the English Football Hall of Fame in 2015.

== Club career ==
White began playing football at the age of ten, when she joined in the training sessions of her brother's team Horley Town. After three years of playing with her brother and his teammates she decided to go to an all-girls coaching session, at which she met Jim Muir, the coach of a local girls' side Horsham Sparrows Ladies . She began playing for the reserves before becoming a first-team player at the age of 14. While still at Horsham, aged 16, White was called up for the national team by Ted Copeland.

In the 1996–97 season White was tapped up by Vic Akers and Arsenal Ladies, and earned her first international cap against Scotland. White broke into the first team, cementing a position at the heart of Arsenal's central defence. She collected her first trophy that year, the FA Women's Premier League.

In 1997–98, due to White's performances in north London she was named the Premier League Player of the Year. Arsenal won the FA Women's Cup and Premier League Cup.

In June 2007, White had a brief loan spell at Ottawa Fury, in order to improve her fitness ahead of the 2007 World Cup, having missed most of the season recovering from an ACL injury.

White achieved major success despite suffering numerous injuries including two cruciate ligament injuries, which kept her out of football for nine months each time. During her career she amassed 31 major trophies at club competition level, winning the FA Women's Premier League 10 times (including seven consecutive years from 2003–04 to 2009–10), the FA Women's Cup nine times, the League Cup six times and the inaugural FA Women's Super League in 2011.

While White was captain, Arsenal won "The Quadruple" (UEFA Women's Champions League, Premier League, FA Cup, League Cup), two "Trebles" (all three major domestic competitions) and four "Doubles" (League title & FA Cup). The club went 108 league games undefeated between 2003 and 2009 and won 51 consecutive league matches between 2006 and 2008. The UEFA Women's Champions League victory in 2007 remains the only victory by an English team in the major European competition since the tournament's inception.

In March 2013, she announced her retirement from her playing career after 17 years as a professional.

== International career ==
White made her England debut against Scotland in 1997, aged 19, followed by her full debut against France in 1998 when she was named player of the match. White went on to represent her country in her first major tournament at UEFA Euro 2001 in Germany.

In 2002, she was named by Hope Powell as England captain against Nigeria, during the qualification campaign for FIFA World Cup in USA. White was to keep the armband until her international retirement in 2012.

She led the Lionesses at UEFA Euro 2005 in England, 2007 FIFA Women's World Cup in China, UEFA Euro 2009 in Finland and 2011 FIFA Women's World Cup in Germany.

At the Quarter Final stage of the 2007 World Cup vs USA in Tianjin, White's nose was broken by an elbow from Abby Wambach ten minutes before half time. White played the remaining duration of the game with the injury, making several vital headed clearances, but was unable to prevent a World Cup exit to the top ranked national team in the world.

In 2009, in her third major championship finals as captain, White led England to the final of Euro 2009 in Helsinki, Finland, where the team lost out to Germany. She wore a protective face mask in the final after breaking her cheekbone in the quarter-final win over Finland in Turku, just six days after having surgery.

In the 2011 FIFA Women's World Cup Quarter Final penalty shoot-out versus France at the BayArena, Leverkusen, White missed England's fifth penalty, seeing the French win 4–3 and progress to the semi-finals.

White was one of the first female players to be given a central contract by The Football Association and also served as an ambassador for England's 2018 World Cup bid.

In April 2012, just prior to the announcement of the Great Britain squad for the upcoming Olympic tournament, White, while still recovering from knee surgery, announced her pregnancy and made the decision to retire from international football.

She was allotted 120 when the FA announced their legacy numbers scheme to honour the 50th anniversary of England’s inaugural international.

=== International goals ===
Scores and results list England's goal tally first.

#	Date	Venue	Opponent	Result	Competition	Scored
1	21 April 1998	The Hawthorns, West Bromwich	Italy	1–2	Friendly	1
2	14 May 1998	Boundary Park, Oldham	Norway	1–2	1999 FIFA World Cup Qual.	1
4	14 November 2003	Deepdale, Preston	Scotland	5–0	Friendly	2
5	6 March 2008	Mourneview Park, Lurgan	Northern Ireland	2–0	2009 UEFA Championship Qual.	1
6	8 May 2008	Darida, Minsk	Belarus	6–1	2009 UEFA Championship Qual.	1
7	11 February 2009	Larnaca	Finland	4–1	Friendly	1
8	31 August 2009	Veritas Stadion, Turku	Sweden	1–1	2009 UEFA Championship	1
9	25 October 2009	Bloomfield Road, Blackpool	Malta	8–0	2011 FIFA World Cup Qual.	1
10	1 March 2010	GSP Stadium, Nicosia	Italy	3–2	Cyprus Cup	1
11	20 May 2010	Centenary Stadium, Ta' Qali	Malta	4–0	2011 FIFA World Cup Qual.	1
12	19 June 2010	Aranda de Duero	Spain	2–2	2011 FIFA World Cup Qual.	1

== Honours ==
Arsenal

- FA Women's Premier League National Division: 1996–97, 2000–01, 2001–02, 2003–04, 2004–05, 2005–06, 2006–07, 2007–08, 2008–09, 2009–10
- Women's Super League: 2011
- Women's FA Cup: 1997–1998, 1998–1999, 2000–01, 2003–04, 2005–06, 2006–07, 2007–08, 2008–09, 2010–11
- FA Women's Premier League Cup: 1997–98, 1998–99, 1999–2000, 2000–01, 2004–05, 2008–09
- Women's FA Community Shield: 2000, 2001, 2005, 2006, 2008
- UEFA Women's Cup: 2006–07

England

- UEFA Women's Championship runner-up: 2009

Individual

- Member of the Order of the British Empire: 2007
- English Football Hall of Fame: 2015
- FA Women's Player's Player of the Year: 1997–98

== Non-playing career ==
White was awarded an honorary degree by the University of Hertfordshire in November 2013.

White acted as the Ambassador for the 2012-13 UEFA Women's Champions League Final in London. She is also an ambassador for the sporting charity Football Foundation.

She was a marketing officer for Arsenal LFC in the FA WSL and is a qualified sports massage therapist.

White appears regularly as co-commentator and studio pundit on television and radio for the BBC, BT Sport, SKY Sports, FATV, ESPN, Eurosport and BBC Radio 5 Live.

== Personal life ==
White was born and grew up in Horley, Surrey and attended Horley Infants School, Yattendon Middle School Horley and Oakwood School, Horley.

She attended Reigate College, and later returned to open the new sports centre in 2010.

She is married to former basketball player Keith Mulholland and has two sons; Lukas, born in 2012 and Jake, born in 2016.
