= 2000 FA Women's Charity Shield =

Annual football match

2000 Women's FA Community Shield
Arsenal	Charlton Athletic
1	1
- Date: 06 August 2000
- Venue: Craven Cottage, London

The 2000 FA Women's Charity Shield was the first Women's FA Charity Shield, as with its male equivalent, the Charity Shield is an annual football match played between the winners of the previous season's league and the previous season's Women's FA Cup. The match was contested between Arsenal and Charlton Athletic, it ended 1–1. It is the only time that the trophy has been shared between two teams.

Although they had finished as runners-up to Croydon in both league and cup, Doncaster Belles were overlooked for a place in this inaugural Charity Shield match. An article in The Guardian described the selection of Charlton Athletic and Arsenal as curious and related to unspecified "commercial reasons".

== Match ==
=== Details ===
06 August 2000
15:45 BST

Arsenal	1–1	Charlton Athletic
Spacey 22'	Report	Arnold 88'

Craven Cottage, Fulham

Arsenal	Charlton Athletic

GK	(Republic of Ireland) Emma Byrne	(substituted off) 61'
DF	(England) Kelley Few	(substituted off) 70'
DF	(England) Faye White
DF	(England) Casey Stoney
DF	(England) Kirsty Pealling
MF	(Wales) Jayne Ludlow
MF	(England) Sian Williams
MF	(Republic of Ireland) Ciara Grant
FW	(England) Clare Wheatley
FW	(England) Marieanne Spacey
FW	(England) Angela Banks	(substituted off) 84'
Substitutes:
GK	(England) Lesley Higgs	(substituted on) 61'
DF	(England) Carol Harwood	(substituted on) 70'
MF	(England) Leanne Small
FW	(England) Ellen Maggs	(substituted on) 84'
Manager:
(England) Vic Akers

GK	(England) Pauline Cope
DF	(England) Sharon Barber
DF	(England) Julie Fletcher
DF	(Northern Ireland) Gill Wylie	(substituted off) 84'
DF	(England) Kyproulla Loizou
MF	(England) Gemma Hunt	(substituted off) 62'
MF	(England) Susannah Abbott	(substituted off) 80'
MF	(England) Tara Proctor
FW	(England) Alexa Hunn
FW	(England) Emily Arnold
FW	(England) Carmaine Walker
Substitutes:
GK	(England) Andrea Cowan
	Sarah Wathen	(substituted on) 62'
	(England) Carole Osborne	(substituted on) 84'
	Danielle Webb	(substituted on) 80'
	Flick de Mauny
Manager:
(Northern Ireland) Gill Wylie
