= Angela Banks =

Angela Banks may refer to:

- Angela Banks (footballer), English footballer
- Angela M. Banks, American lawyer and legal academic
