= Angela Banks (footballer) =

English footballer

Personal information
- Date of birth: 23 December 1975 (age 50)
- Place of birth: Brighton, England
- Height: 5 ft 7 in (1.70 m)
- Position: Forward

Youth career
- Whitehawk

Senior career*
Years	Team	Apps	(Gls)
- Surahammar
- Jitex BK
1998–1999	Whitehawk		
1999–2003	Arsenal		
2004–2005	Arsenal		
2005–2006	Whitehawk		

International career
1999–2002	England	18	(4)
- * Club domestic league appearances and goals as of 11:58, 12 August 2009 (UTC)

Angela Banks (born 23 December 1975) is an English former female footballer. She represented England at full international level and played at the top club level for Arsenal Ladies.

== Club career ==
Banks joined Whitehawk Ladies aged 11, but moved to Sweden aged 16. She spent four years playing for Surahammar, then signed for Jitex BK. Despite becoming engaged to a Swedish man, Banks left Sweden to be nearer to her parents, who are deaf.

In 1998 Banks returned to Whitehawk and finished top goalscorer in the 1998–99 FA Women's Premier League Southern Division. She then signed for Arsenal in summer 1999, being employed by the club as a football development officer. She has also done coaching and other administrative duties.

Banks scored 42 goals in 2000–01 as Arsenal won the domestic treble, including the winner in the FA Women's Cup final against professional Fulham. Banks was the player of the match for the FA Cup final. Her season total also included scoring five goals against Liverpool in December 2000. She was the league's top scorer.

During the 2001-02 season, Banks scored the first ever goal for Arsenal women in European football against Swiss champions Bern in the group stage. Banks celebrated with her first and only knee-slide.

In March 2002 Fulham entered a seven-day notice of their intent to sign Banks, much to the fury of Arsenal manager Vic Akers. However Banks pledged her future to Arsenal when they announced a switch to semi-professionalism in May 2002. Banks retired at the end of 2002–03, but returned to Arsenal for 2004–05, helping the club remain undefeated and win another league title. Banks scored 133 goals in 143 appearances for Arsenal.

In 2005 Banks returned to Whitehawk, and joined the coaching staff at the club a year later – alongside Debbie Bampton.

== International career ==
While playing in Sweden, Banks was encouraged by her club coach to take dual-nationality and play for the Sweden women's national football team. She rejected the opportunity.

In May 1999 Banks made her international debut for England against Italy. Two years later she scored her second international goal, a game-winning twenty yard chip against Scotland. Banks' first goal came in only her second start, a 2–1 friendly win over Finland in September 2000.

Banks also scored against Russia in a 1–1 draw at UEFA Women's Euro 2001. In March 2002 Banks captained England for the first time, scoring in a 3–1 loss to Norway at the Algarve Cup.

Due in part to a fear of flying, Banks quit international football in July 2002.

She was allotted 131 when the FA announced their legacy numbers scheme to honour the 50th anniversary of England’s inaugural international.

== Honours ==
Arsenal

- FA Women's Premier League: 2000–01, 2001–02, 2004–05
- FA Cup: 2000–01
- FA Women's National League Cup: 1999–00, 2000–01, 2004–5
- FA Women's Community Shield: 2000, 2001
- London County FA Women's Cup: 1999–00
