= 2000–01 FA Women's Cup =

Tournament details
- Country: England; Wales

Final positions
- Champions: Arsenal
- Runners-up: Fulham
- Penalty shoot-outs do not count towards the total number of goals.

The 2000–01 FA Women's Cup was an association football knockout tournament for women's teams, held between 10 September 2000 and 7 May 2001. It was the 31st season of the FA Women's Cup and was won by Arsenal, who defeated Fulham in the final. The tournament consisted of two qualifying rounds and eight rounds of competition proper.

All match results and dates from the Women's FA Cup Website.

== Extra preliminary round ==
All games were played on 10 and 17 September 2000.

Tie	Home team (tier)	Score	Away team (tier)	Att.
1	AFC Preston	1–6	Scunthorpe United	
2	Aldershot Town	0–2	Rushden & Diamonds	
3	Ambassadors in Sport	1–2	Preston North End	
4	Barnet Copthall	8–0	Maidstone United	
5	Belper Town	6–0	Worksop Town	
6	Billericay Town	2–0	Basingstoke Town	
7	Cambridge United	0–4	Crystal Palace (Bromley)	
8	Carlisle Wanderers	0–1	Stockport Celtic	
9	Caversham	9–3	Woodbridge Town	
10	Chaffoteaux	2–0	Billesley United	
11	Chorley	0–2	Barnsley	
12	Corfe Hills United	3–0	North Molton Sports	
13	Crewe Alexandra	2–6	Kettering Amazons	
14	Croydon Postal	7–1	Hackney	
15	Deans	0–4	Windscale	
16	Elmore Eagles	4–2	Dorchester	
17	Exeter Rangers	1–3	Cogan Coronation	
18	Gravesend & Northfleet	1–11	Gillingham	
19	Great Wyrley	4–4 (2–3 p)	Nettleham	
20	Gresley Rovers	4–4 (3–4 p)	Atherstone United	
21	Haringey Borough	5–3	London Ladies	
22	Haverhill Rovers	9–0	Thame United	
23	Haywards Heath Town	3–2	Abbey Rangers	
24	Hereford United	3–1	Bristol United	
25	Hull City	2–4	Killingworth YPC	
26	King's Lynn	4–0	Romford	
27	Launceston	1–10	Keynsham Town	
28	Leighton Linslade	0–3	Slough	
29	Lichfield Diamonds	11–0	ES Barwell	
30	Lincoln City	6–0	North Staffs	

Tie	Home team (tier)	Score	Away team (tier)	Att.
31	Loughborough Dynamo	0–8	Leicester City	
32	Loughborough Students	6–1	Wem Town Raiders	
Wem Town Raiders awarded the tie. Loughborough Students fielded 12 ineligible players.
33	Luton	0–6	Chesham United	
34	Marjons	20–1	Madron	
35	Morley Spurs	3–3 (3–4 p)	Billingham	
36	Newport Pagnell Town	4–1	Woodham Radars	
37	Newsham Park Hospital	4–3	Bolton Wanderers (Supporters)	
38	Penrith Sapphires	5–0	Corwen	
39	Real Maghull	0–12	Chester City	
40	Royston Town	0–6	Redbridge Raiders	
41	Stockport County	13–1	Newton Aycliffe	
42	Tamworth	2–3	Kidderminster Harriers	
43	Thorpe United	5–2	Broughton Aerospace	
Broughton Airspace awarded the tie. Thorpe United fielded 2 ineligible players.
44	Tipton Town	1–2	Grantham Town	
45	Tottenham Hotspur	5–1	Colney Heath	
46	Trafford	5–3	Bury	
47	Viking Rangers	6–6 (1–3 p)	Hastings Town	
48	Warminster Town	0–11	Okeford United	
49	Warrington Grange	6–4 (a.e.t.)	Wigan	
50	Wendron	0–8	Penzance	
51	West Ham United	7–0	Tring Athletic	
52	Willenhall Town	1–4	Steel City Wanderers	
53	Wimborne Town	4–1	Swindon Spitfires	
54	Wisbech Town	0–7	Bishop's Stortford	
55	Witton Albion	9–0	Greyhound Gunners	
56	Wycombe Wanderers	1–3	Malling	

== Preliminary round ==
All games were played on 24 September and 1 October 2000.

Tie	Home team (tier)	Score	Away team (tier)	Att.
1	Barnet Copthall	2–6	Chesham United	
2	Barnsley	1–0	Windscale	
3	Brentford	2–13	Rushden & Diamonds	
4	Broughton Aerospace	1–1 (3–4 p)	Wakefield	
5	Caversham	5–2	Launton	
6	Croydon Postal	1–2	Crystal Palace (Bromley)	
7	Elburton Villa	0–2 (a.e.t.)	Corfe Hills United	
8	Elmore Eagles	6–1	Keynsham Town	
9	Grantham Town	2–4	Belper Town	
10	Great Wyrley	1–3	Chaffoteaux	
11	Haringey Borough	4–1	Billericay Town	
12	Haverhill Rovers	2–1	Bishop's Stortford	
13	Haywards Heath Town	1–0	Newport Pagnell Town	
14	Kidderminster Harriers	0–4	Lincoln City	
15	Lichfield Diamonds	6–1	Leicester City	
16	Malling	3–2	Woking	
17	Marjons	0–5	Okeford United	

Tie	Home team (tier)	Score	Away team (tier)	Att.
18	Mond Rangers	1–3	Chester City	
19	Penrith Sapphires	2–5	Scunthorpe United	
20	Penzance	2–1	Cogan Coronation	
21	Preston North End	2–0	Stockport Celtic	
Match abandoned after 78 minutes. Replayed
replay	Preston North End	7–0	Stockport Celtic	
22	Redbridge Raiders	0–1 (a.e.t.)	West Ham United	
23	Redbridge Wanderers	0–12	Gillingham	
24	Silsden	4–5	Witton Albion	
25	Slough	4–0	King's Lynn	
26	Steel City Wanderers	2–4	Kettering Amazons	
27	Stockport County	2–7	Billingham	
28	Tottenham Hotspur	2–1	Hastings Town	
29	Trafford	5–2	Newsham Park Hospital	
30	Warrington Grange	1–3	Killingworth YPC	
31	Wem Town Raiders	3–4	Atherstone United	
32	Wimborne Town	5–2	Hereford United	

== First round proper ==
All games were scheduled for 29 October and 5, 10, 12 and 19 November 2000.

Tie	Home team (tier)	Score	Away team (tier)	Att.
1	Atherstone United	0–3	Walsall	
2	Blackpool Wren Rovers	6–0	Newcastle	
3	Chester City	4–1	Scunthorpe United	
4	Chester Le Street Town	H–W	Three Bridges	
Walkover to Chester–le–Street.
5	Chesterfield	8–2	Kettering Amazons	
6	Clevedon	0–9	Bristol Rovers	
7	Corfe Hills United	3–0	Elmore Eagles	
8	Crowborough Athletic	0–7	West Ham United	
9	Darlington	2–4	Billingham	
10	Denham United	1–5	Malling	
11	Doncaster Rovers	3–4	Bradford City	
12	Enfield	4–0	Caversham	
13	Fulham	14–0	Crystal Palace (Bromley)	
14	Gillingham	5–1	Bedford Town Bells	
15	Haringey Borough	1–7	Tottenham Hotspur	
16	Haverhill Rovers	1–3	Charlton	
17	Highfield Rangers	5–1	Lichfield Diamonds	
18	Ilkeston	1–2	Parkgate	
19	Killingworth YPC	1–2	Blackburn Rovers	
20	Manchester City	4–1	Manchester United	
21	Mansfield Town	3–3 (3–4 p)	Chaffoteaux	
22	Middlesbrough	2–3	Leeds City Vixens	

Tie	Home team (tier)	Score	Away team (tier)	Att.
23	Oxford United	1–6	Bristol City	
24	Peterborough United	0–2	Derby County	
25	Portsmouth	9–2	Okeford United	
26	Preston North End	4–2	Barnsley	
27	Racers	1–1 (a.e.t.)	Chesham United	
Abandoned in extra time due to player injury. Replay to be played at Chesham.
27 (Replay)	Chesham United	7–1	Racers	
28	Reading	2–2 (8–7 p)	Yeovil Town	
29	Rushden & Diamonds	3–0	Watford	
30	Saltash Pilgrims	1–4	Cheltenham Town	
31	Shrewsbury Town	3–2	Lincoln City	
32	Slough	0–4	Chelmsford City	
33	Southampton	3–1	Penzance	
34	Stafford Rangers	5–3	Arnold Town	
35	Stowmarket	2–1 (a.e.t.)	Hampton	
36	Swindon Town	9–0	Wimborne Town	
37	Telford United	1–0	Belper Town	
38	Wakefield	H–W	Trafford	
Walkover to Wakefield.
39	Whitehawk	3–2	Haywards Heath Town	
40	Witton Albion	1–2	Stockport Hatters	

== Second round proper ==
All games were originally scheduled for 3, 12, 19 and 26 November and 3 and 17 December 2000.

Tie	Home team (tier)	Score	Away team (tier)	Att.
1	Blackburn Rovers	3–5	Parkgate	
2	Bradford City	1–4	Leeds City Vixens	
3	Bristol City	0–4	Bristol Rovers	
4	Charlton	1–19	Fulham	
5	Cheltenham Town	3–2	Portsmouth	
6	Chesham United	6–5	Highfield Rangers	
7	Chester City	7–1	Wakefield	
8	Chester Le Street Town	5–3	Billingham	
9	Corfe Hills United	3–3 (0–2 p)	Reading	
10	Enfield	15–0	Malling	

Tie	Home team (tier)	Score	Away team (tier)	Att.
11	Gillingham	6–2	Tottenham Hotspur	
12	Mansfield Town	5–3 (a.e.t.)	Chesterfield	
13	Preston North End	2–3	Blackpool Wren Rovers	
14	Shrewsbury Town	1–4	Derby County	
15	Stockport Hatters	0–3	Manchester City	
16	Stowmarket	3–0	Chelmsford City	
17	Swindon Town	3–0	Southampton	
18	Telford United	2–0 (a.e.t.)	Rushden & Diamonds	
19	Walsall	1–1 (3–2 p)	Stafford Rangers	
20	Whitehawk	0–6	West Ham United	

== Third round proper ==
All games were originally scheduled for 10 and 17 December 2000 and 7 and 14 January 2001.

Tie	Home team (tier)	Score	Away team (tier)	Att.
1	Aston Villa	1–0	Bangor City	
2	Barking	0–11	Barnet	
3	Berkhamsted Town	2–0	Reading Royals	
4	Birmingham City	2–0	Oldham Curzon	
5	Blackpool Wren Rovers	3–0	Newcastle Town	
6	Brighton & Hove Albion	3–1	Gillingham	
7	Bristol Rovers	7–0	Cheltenham Town	
8	Chesham United	2–4	Newport County	
9	Chester Le Street Town	2–0	Sheffield Wednesday	
10	Coventry City	0–3	Chester City	
11	Derby County	1–0	Telford United	

Tie	Home team (tier)	Score	Away team (tier)	Att.
12	Ilkeston Town	1–0	Leeds City Vixens	
13	Ipswich Town	0–10	Fulham	
14	Langford	0–3	Chelsea	
15	Leeds United	8–0	Huddersfield Town	
16	Manchester City	2–1 (a.e.t.)	Walsall	
17	Mansfield Town	2–2 (4–3 p)	Parkgate	
18	Reading	0–2	Enfield	
19	Stowmarket	1–2	Swindon Town	
20	West Ham United	3–0	Wembley Mill Hill	
21	Wimbledon	6–0	Cardiff City	
22	Wolverhampton Wanderers	4–0	Garswood Saints	

== Fourth round proper ==
All games were originally scheduled for 7, 14 and 21 and 28 January 2001.

7 January 2001	Arsenal (1)	5–3	Leeds United (2)	Borehamwood
	Grant 12'; Spacey; Ludlow; Maggs	Report	Daniel; Ward; Kelly	Stadium: Meadow Park; Referee: W Savill

7 January 2001	Chelsea (2)	5–3	Barry Town (1)
	O'Sullivan (o.g.); Cox; Wickham; Williams	Report	Williams 51'

7 January 2001	Derby County (3)	0–8	Wolverhampton Wanderers (2)
		Report	Guise; Fellows; Ward

7 January 2001	Millwall Lionesses (1)	1–4	Everton (1)
	Mason 40'	Report	Shimmin 6' (pen.); Handley 24'; Unitt 69'; McDougall 75'

7 January 2001	Newport County (2)	3–3 (a.e.t.) (2–4 p)	Chester Le Street Town (3)
	Goal	Report	Goal
	Penalties
	Penalty scored Penalty missed		Penalty scored

7 January 2001	Sunderland (1)	1–3	Charlton Athletic (1)	Belmont
	Bell 57'	Report	Willoughby 24' (o.g.); Moore 27'; Abbot 90+10'	Stadium: New Ferens Park

7 January 2001	Tranmere Rovers (1)	2–3	Doncaster Belles (1)	Heswall
	Smith	Report	Walker; Barr 85'	Stadium: Gayton Park

14 January 2001	Wimbledon (2)	0–4	Southampton Saints (1)
		Report	Goal

14 January 2001	Berkhamsted Town (2)	0–1	Brighton & Hove Albion (2)
		Report	Goal

14 January 2001	Birmingham City (2)	1–2	Aston Villa (2)
	Goal	Report	Goal

14 January 2001	Bristol Rovers (3)	1–0	Mansfield Town (3)
	Goal	Report

14 January 2001	Liverpool (1)	3–0	Chester City (4)
	Goal	Report

14 January 2001	Swindon Town (3)	1–2 (a.e.t.)	Enfield (3)
	Goal	Report	Goal

21 January 2001	Fulham (3)	8–0	Manchester City (3)	Motspur Park
	Pettersen; Haugenes	Report		Stadium: Fulham Training Ground; Attendance: 200; Referee: Mr M. Izzard

28 January 2001	Blackpool Wren Rovers (3)	1–7	Barnet (2)	Blackpool
	Goal	Report	Goal	Stadium: Brews Park

28 January 2001	West Ham United (4)	1–4	Ilkeston Town (2)	Aveley
	Pittuck 28'	Report	Bailey 20'; 55' (o.g.); Taylor; Plinston	Stadium: Parkside

== Fifth round proper ==
All games were played on 28 January and 11 February 2001.

28 January 2001	Brighton & Hove Albion (2)	1–3	Aston Villa (2)
	Rice	Report	Robinson; Dolphin; Masters 88'

28 January 2001	Bristol Rovers (3)	4–3	Chester Le Street Town (3)	Memorial Stadium
	Goal	Report	Goal	Referee: Mr John Farries (Oxford)

28 January 2001	Doncaster Belles (1)	8–0	Wolverhampton Wanderers (2)	Woodlands
	Garside; Burke; Low; Slucott (o.g.)	Report		Stadium: Welfare Ground

28 January 2001	Everton (1)	1–2	Charlton Athletic (1)
	Mason 81'	Report	Moore 1', 69'

28 January 2001	Liverpool (1)	0–8	Fulham (3)
		Report	McArthur 7'; Haugenes 55' (pen.); Pettersen; Betts; White; Rahmann

11 February 2001	Barnet (2)	3–0	Enfield (3)	Chipping Barnet
	Goal	Report		Stadium: Underhill Stadium

11 February 2001	Chelsea (2)	0–10	Arsenal (1)
		Report	Spacey (pen.); Ludlow; Grant; Banks	Attendance: 63; Referee: Michael S Hayward

11 February 2001	Ilkeston Town (2)	1–4	Southampton Saints (1)
	Cox 30'	Report	Nwajei 7', 85'; Ritchie 12'; Brown 36'

== Quarter–finals ==
All games were played on 18 February 2001.

18 February 2001	Arsenal (1)	1–0	Doncaster Belles (1)	Borehamwood
14:00 GMT	Spacey 31'	Report		Stadium: Meadow Park; Referee: I Butterworth

18 February 2001	Bristol Rovers (3)	1–0	Aston Villa (2)	Bristol
	Curtis 80'	Report		Stadium: Memorial Stadium; Attendance: 1,362

18 February 2001	Fulham (3)	5–0	Barnet (2)	New Malden
	Pettersen 53', 88'; Rahmann; McArthur; Chapman	Report		Stadium: Motspur Park; Referee: Mr S Robinson

18 February 2001	Southampton Saints (1)	3–2	Charlton Athletic (1)
	Osborne 4' (o.g.); Ritchie 12'; Brown 24'	Report	Lorton 35'; Moore 90+3'

== Semi–finals ==
All games were played on 25 February 2001.

25 March 2001	Bristol Rovers (3)	0–3	Arsenal (1)	Bristol
		Report	Banks 65'; Ludlow 70'; Grant 82'	Stadium: Memorial Stadium; Attendance: 3,306; Referee: J Farries (Bicester)

25 March 2001	Fulham (3)	5–0	Southampton Saints (1)	Kingston upon Thames
	Duncan 1'; Poore 20' (o.g.); Haugenes; Rahman 40'	Report		Stadium: Kingsmeadow; Attendance: 951; Referee: M Ford (Epsom)

== Final ==
7 May 2001

Arsenal	1–0	Fulham
Banks 54'	Report

Selhurst Park, London
Attendance: 13,824
Referee: T Parkes (Birmingham)
