= Lesley Higgs =

English footballer

Personal information
- Date of birth: 25 October 1965 (age 61)
- Place of birth: England
- Position: Goalkeeper

Senior career*
Years	Team	Apps	(Gls)
- Watford
- Hemel Hempstead
- Milton Keynes
- Millwall Lionesses
1991–1994	Arsenal		
1994–1997	Wembley		
1997–2001	Arsenal		

International career
	England	16	(0)
- * Club domestic league appearances and goals

Lesley Higgs (née Shipp; born 25 October 1965) is an English former international women's football goalkeeper. She appeared for England in the 1995 FIFA Women's World Cup Finals.

== Club career ==
Higgs won her first Women's FA Cup when Millwall Lionesses beat Doncaster Belles 1‍–‍0 at Prenton Park in the 1991 final.

While playing for Arsenal, Higgs was Player of the Match in the 1993 WFA Cup Final which Arsenal won 3‍–‍0.

In 1995, Higgs was playing for Wembley Ladies. She played in goal during the 1997 FA Women's Cup final where Wembley were defeated 1–0 by Millwall Lionesses. She left Wembley to rejoin Arsenal in the 1997 close season. She was an unused substitute in the 2001 FA Women's Cup final as Arsenal defeated Fulham at Selhurst Park.

== International career ==
Higgs went to the 1995 World Cup as deputy to regular England keeper Pauline Cope. With quarter-final qualification ensured after winning the first two group games, Higgs played in the final group game, a 3–2 win against Nigeria.

She has England legacy number 81. The FA announced their legacy numbers scheme to honour the 50th anniversary of England's inaugural international.
