= Caroline Thorpe =

Irish footballer (born 1981)

Personal information
- Date of birth: 2 August 1981 (age 45)
- Place of birth: Dublin, Ireland
- Position: Midfielder

Youth career
- Redlake

Senior career*
Years	Team	Apps	(Gls)
1999–2000	St. Catherine's		
2000–2001	Arsenal		
2001	St. Catherine's		
2001–2003	Leeds United		
2002	Memphis Mercury		
2004	UCD		
- St. Catherine's
2011–2012	Peamount United		
2012–2013	Raheny United		
2014	Peamount United		
2014–2016	UCD Waves		

International career
	Republic of Ireland	24	(6)
- * Club domestic league appearances and goals

Caroline Thorpe (born 2 August 1981) is an Irish former international football midfielder who played for Raheny United, Peamount United and DLR Waves of the Women's National League. She also represented English Premier League clubs Arsenal Ladies and Leeds United Ladies, as well as Memphis Mercury in America.

== Club career ==
Thorpe began her career with Redlake before moving to St. Catherine's in 1999. After helping the club to promotion, she joined Arsenal Ladies in August 2000 along with compatriots Susan Heapes and Yvonne Tracy. Thorpe was one of seven Irish players then in the Arsenal squad, and with Emma Byrne and Ciara Grant, one of three who were regulars in the first team. On her debut Thorpe scored two goals in a 5–0 win over Tranmere Rovers. She won the domestic treble in her first season, and was an unused substitute as Arsenal beat Fulham in the 2001 FA Women's Cup final at Selhurst Park.

Despite this success Thorpe returned to St. Catherine's in May 2001. She was back in the FA Women's Premier League in 2001–02, but with newly promoted Leeds United. In summer 2002 Thorpe played in the American W-League with Memphis Mercury, before returning to Leeds for 2002–03.

Thorpe and her ex-Arsenal teammate Susan Heapes both played in St. Catherine's 1–0 FAI Women's Cup final defeat to St Francis in July 2009. A third Arsenal player from that era, Grainne Kierans, was on the opposing side.

Thorpe signed for Shamrock Rovers for the inaugural 2011–12 Women's National League (WNL) season but only played in one match before transferring to Champions elect Peamount United during the campaign. At the end of the season she joined Raheny United and collected another league winner's medal in 2012–13. She was also named in the 2012–13 WNL Team of the Season. In the 2013 FAI Women's Cup Final at the Aviva Stadium, Thorpe was Player of the Match as Raheny United beat Castlebar Celtic 3–2 after extra time. She finished the 2013–14 season back at Peamount, then retired after spending two seasons with UCD Waves.

== International career ==
Thorpe's first representative games for Ireland came as a 16-year-old. In September 2000 Thorpe scored against Scotland and Northern Ireland as the Republic won the Celt Cup, a quadrangular tournament also featuring the Isle of Man. That year she was named Under-18 International Player of the Year at the FAI International Football Awards.

She later featured in the qualifying tournaments for the 2003 World Cup and 2005 European Championship. In October 2004 Thorpe scored Ireland's winner in a 2–1 friendly win in the Faroe Islands and then played in a 5–1 loss to the United States at Soldier Field. She completed her international career with six goals from 24 caps.

== Personal life ==
Thorpe battled an eating disorder and depression during her football career. She left Arsenal after one season due to alleged bullying from an unnamed teammate. She later spent approximately six years away from football after taking offence at a comment made by one of her Ireland teammates.
