= 2000–01 FA Women's Premier League Cup =

Tournament details
- Country: England

Final positions
- Champions: Arsenal
- Runners-up: Tranmere Rovers

The 2000–01 FA Women's Premier League Cup was the 10th staging of the FA Women's Premier League Cup, a knockout competition for England's top 36 women's football clubs.

The tournament was won by Arsenal, who beat Tranmere Rovers 3–0 in the final.

== Results ==
=== Qualifying round ===
Matches were played on 10 September 2000.

10 September 2000	Wolverhampton Wanderers (NO)	0–3	Birmingham City (NO)
		Report	Goal

10 September 2000	Langford (S)	1–3	Ilkeston Town (NO)
	Goal	Report	Goal

=== First round ===
Matches were played on 24 September 2000.

24 September 2000	Newcastle Town (NO)	0–14	Charlton Athletic (NA)
		Report	Goal

24 September 2000	Doncaster Belles (NA)	7–2	Garswood Saints (NO)
	Easton 10'; Walker (pen.); Garside; Barr; Borman; Abrahams	Report	Bell

24 September 2000	Everton (NA)	7–0	Huddersfield Town (NO)
	Woodhead 20', 31'; Britton 34'; Shimmin; Duffy; Formston	Report

24 September 2000	Tranmere Rovers (NA)	7–1	Chelsea (S)
	Burns; Smith; Burns; Preston; Dunne; Anderton	Report	Williams

24 September 2000	Millwall Lionesses (NA)	3–2 (a.e.t.)	Barry Town (NA)
	Thrower; Warren 109'	Report	Williams 2'; Strudley 21'

24 September 2000	Cardiff City (S)	5–1	Coventry City (S)
	Goal	Report	Goal

24 September 2000	Oldham Curzon (NO)	4–5	Wimbledon (S)
	Goal	Report	Goal

24 September 2000	Brighton & Hove Albion (S)	4–0	Newport County (S)
	Goal	Report

24 September 2000	Barnet (S)	7–1	Ipswich Town (S)
	Goal	Report	Goal

24 September 2000	Leeds United (NO)	6–0	Ilkeston Town (NO)
	Goal	Report

24 September 2000	Wembley Mill Hill (S)	0–3	Bangor City (N)
		Report	Goal

24 September 2000	Sunderland (NA)	0–7	Arsenal (NA)
		Report	Banks; Grant; Wooliscroft; Ludlow; Thorpe

24 September 2000	Reading Royals (S)	0–6	Birmingham City (NO)
		Report	Goal

24 September 2000	Berkhamsted Town (S)	4–3	Barking (S)
	Goal	Report	Goal

24 September 2000	Southampton Saints (NA)	5–0	Sheffield Wednesday (NO)
	Nwajei; Ritchie; Yorston; Howe	Report

24 September 2000	Aston Villa (NO)	2–3	Liverpool (NA)
	Goal	Report	Goal

=== Second round ===
Matches were played on 29 October and 5 November 2000 and 11 and 22 February 2001.

29 October 2000	Cardiff City (S)	0–5	Barnet (S)
		Report	Goal

5 November 2000	Arsenal (NA)	5–1	Southampton Saints (NA)
	Ludlow; Banks; Spacey (pen.); Thorpe	Report	Keehan 80'

5 November 2000	Bangor City (NO)	3–5	Charlton Athletic (NA)
	Earnshaw; Foster	Report	Moore; Arnold; Hunt; Proctor

5 November 2000	Birmingham City (NO)	0–4	Everton (NA)
		Report	Handley 16', 57'; McDougall 17'; Krivinskas

5 November 2000	Brighton & Hove Albion (S)	0–1	Tranmere Rovers (NA)
		Report	Preston 88'

5 November 2000	Wimbledon (S)	0–1	Leeds United (NO)
		Report	Ward

11 February 2001	Millwall Lionesses (NA)	3–0	Berkhamsted Town (S)
	Warren 33', 75'; Flindt 73'	Report

22 February 2001	Liverpool (NA)	1–6	Doncaster Belles (NA)
	Goal	Report	Goal

=== Quarter-finals ===
Matches were played on 11, 18, 25 and 27 February 2001

11 February 2001	Tranmere Rovers (NA)	4–2	Everton (NA)
	Smith 19', 23' (pen.), 68', 90'	Report	Unitt 46'; Handley 55'

18 February 2001	Millwall Lionesses (NA)	2–1	Leeds United (NO)
	Goal	Report	Goal

25 February 2001	Doncaster Belles (NA)	1–2	Arsenal (NA)
	Burke 78' (pen.)	Report	Grant 35'; Spacey 75'

27 February 2001	Barnet (S)	0–2	Charlton Athletic (NA)
		Report	Goal

=== Semi-finals ===
Matches were played on 25 February and 11 March 2001.

25 February 2001	Tranmere Rovers (NA)	3–2	Millwall Lionesses (NA)
	Goal	Report	Goal

11 March 2001	Charlton Athletic (NA)	0–3	Arsenal (NA)
		Report	Banks 10', 61'; Ludlow 50'

=== Final ===
1 April 2001

Tranmere Rovers	0–3	Arsenal
	Report	Spacey 52', 53'; Banks 82'

Deva Stadium, Chester
Referee: E. M. Evans.
