= Vic Akers =

English football player and manager (born 1946)

Vic Akers OBE
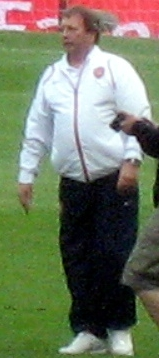
- Akers in 2007

Personal information
- Full name: Victor David Akers
- Date of birth: 24 August 1946 (age 80)
- Place of birth: Islington, London, England
- Position: Left back

Senior career*
Years	Team	Apps	(Gls)
1965–1968	Tonbridge	237	(13)
1969–1971	Bexley United		
1971–1975	Cambridge United	129	(5)
1975–1976	Watford	22	(0)
1976–1978	Dartford		
1978–1980	Hayes	78	(7)
1980–1984	Slough Town		
1984–1986	Carshalton Athletic		

Managerial career
- 1987–1997: Arsenal Ladies
- 1998–2009: Arsenal Ladies
- * Club domestic league appearances and goals

Victor David Akers, OBE (born 24 August 1946) is an English football manager and former player who played as a left back.

As manager of Arsenal Ladies he became the club's most successful manager of all time winning 35 trophies from 1993 to 2009. In 1997 Akers became Arsenal men's team kit manager, a position he left subsequent to the departure of Arsène Wenger in 2018. During his first season as Arsenal's kit manager he stepped down as manager of the women's team but returned for the 1998–99 season.

== Playing career ==
Born in Islington, London, Akers started his career in the youth set-up with Fulham but did not sign a professional contract with the club. He moved into non-league football with Tonbridge Angels (where his consistency at left-back meant that Malcolm Macdonald was forced to play as a left-footed right back, before converting to striker when he joined Luton Town.), before signing for Bexley United in May 1969. In July 1971 he signed for Cambridge United for £5000, and was part of the side that claimed the club's first promotion season in 1973, from the old Fourth Division. He made 129 league appearances for Cambridge before joining Watford in July 1975 for a fee thought to be either £1000 or £2000. He was an ever-present for the first half of the club's first season back in the Fourth Division after relegation, making 22 league appearances as well as a further 4 in cup competitions. In July 1976 he joined Dartford for free, helping them win the Southern League Cup of 1977. He went on to play for Hayes in 1978, and by October 1980 had joined Slough Town winning a treble of Isthmian League Premier Division, Berks and Bucks Senior Cup and the Isthmian League Cup of 1981. By March 1984 he was playing for Carshalton Athletic where he spent two years at and away from Colston Avenue. Akers then joined Arsenal as the head of the club's community section.

== Managerial career ==
Akers was appointed head of Arsenal's community section in 1986 and in 1987 founded the Arsenal Ladies team. He managed Arsenal Ladies to every major trophy in English women's football winning the FA Women's Cup ten times, the FA Women's Premier League Cup nine times and the FA Women's Premier League eleven times. Akers, in so doing, attained five League and FA Women's Cup Doubles and four domestic Trebles. Akers also won the UEFA Women's Cup with Arsenal in 2007, being the first and only English side to do so, with the success being repeated in 2025. He retired in 2009 from the Arsenal Ladies post having won thirty-two major trophies in total.

Akers was appointed Officer of the Order of the British Empire (OBE) in the 2010 New Year Honours for services to sport.

In May 2018, Akers retired as Arsenal's kit manager and was succeeded by his son, Paul.

In February 2019, Akers joined Boreham Wood as Assistant Manager. He left the role in August 2020.

== Honours ==
=== Playing career ===
Cambridge United

- Football League Fourth Division, promoted (in 3rd place) to Third Division: 1973

Dartford

- Southern League Cup: 1977

Slough Town

- Isthmian League Premier Division: 1981
- Isthmian League Cup: 1981
- Berks and Bucks Senior Cup:1981

=== Managerial career ===
Arsenal Ladies

- UEFA Women's Cup: 2006–07
- FA Women's Premier League: 1992–93, 1994–95, 1996–97, 2000–01, 2001–02, 2003–04, 2004–05, 2005–06, 2006–07, 2007–08, 2008–09
- FA Women's Cup: 1992–93, 1994–95, 1998–99, 2000–01, 2003–04, 2005–06, 2006–07, 2007–08, 2008–09
- FA Women's Premier League Cup: 1991–92, 1992–93, 1993–94, 1998–99, 1999–2000, 2000–01, 2004–05, 2006–07, 2008–09
- FA Women's Community Shield: 2000, 2001, 2004, 2006, 2008
