= Marieanne Spacey =

English footballer

Marieanne Spacey MBE
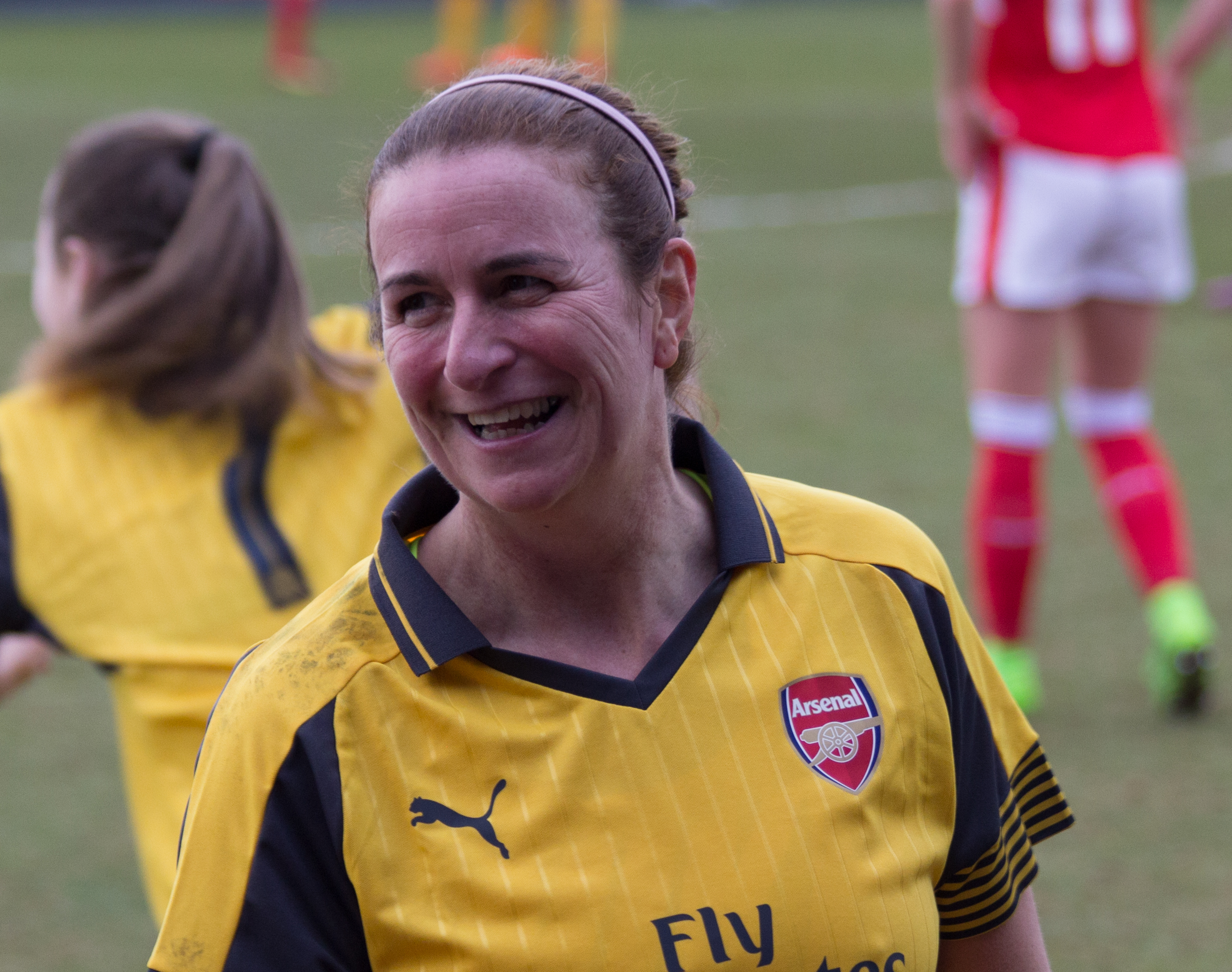
- Spacey in 2017

Personal information
- Full name: Marieanne Spacey
- Date of birth: 13 February 1966 (age 60)
- Place of birth: Sutton, London, England
- Positions: Second striker; attacking midfielder

Team information
- Current team: Southampton (interim manager)

Youth career
- 1979–1985: British Oxygen

Senior career*
Years	Team	Apps	(Gls)
1985–1989	Friends of Fulham		
1989	HJK Helsinki		
1989–1993	Friends of Fulham		
1993–2002	Arsenal		
2002–2005	Fulham		

International career
1984–2001	England	94	(30)

Managerial career
- 2003–2006: Fulham
- 2018–2024: Southampton
- 2025: Southampton (interim)
- * Club domestic league appearances and goals

Marieanne Spacey-Cale MBE (née Spacey; born 13 February 1966) is an English former international women's footballer. Having played 94 times for England, Spacey is considered one of the greatest English footballers of all time. From 2018 to 2024, she was head coach of Southampton FC Women.

== Club career ==
Spacey was prevented from participating in boys' football at school but joined British Oxygen's women's team at the age of 13 in 1979. She played for Friends of Fulham under the tutelage of Fred Brockwell and was reported to have signed for Italian club Roi Lazio as a 19-year–old in 1985. Spacey also played for HJK Helsinki in Finland. The Finnish move came about through Spacey's England teammate Louise Waller, who had played for HJK the previous summer. After playing in Friends of Fulham's 3–2 WFA Cup final defeat to Leasowe Pacific at Old Trafford in April 1989, Spacey flew out to Helsinki with Waller and remained until September. Spacey then returned to England and scored 12 goals in the first five games of the 1991–92 season for her old club, who became known as Wimbledon Ladies in 1991.

Spacey then spent eight seasons with Arsenal from 1993, before moving to Fulham on a professional contract in the 2002 close season. She had missed the second part of 1995–96 due to pregnancy. In her final season with Arsenal she was the leading goalscorer and FA Players' Player of the Year, also winning a Sport Relief special achievement award. Throughout her Arsenal career Spacey had enjoyed great success as a deep–lying forward player, helping The Gunners win numerous trophies.

Vic Akers said of Spacey's career in 2009:

"Marieanne was one of the most feared forwards in the game. She had good technique, ability on the ball, pace and power, and she was capable of scoring goals from all over the pitch – many of them from distance."

In 2002–03 Spacey won a domestic treble with Fulham.

== International career ==
Spacey made her debut for England against Belgium on 20 August 1984. She played in all four of England's games at their first FIFA Women's World Cup appearance in 1995. Having finished playing for England with a respectable 76 appearances, Spacey was later recalled by Hope Powell to add experience in midfield. Spacey was surprised by the development: "I honestly thought that wouldn't happen again. When I got the letter my legs went weak. I've played 76 times for England and now I feel like the new girl!" She went on to play a total of 91 times for her country, scoring 28 goals before retiring after UEFA Women's Euro 2001, aged 36.

Among Spacey's achievements with England were two Mundialito tournament wins in 1985 and 1988. She scored twice in the 1985 final against hosts Italy as England won 3–2 in Caorle. In May 1990 Spacey scored at Wembley Stadium in an exhibition match played against Scotland. The following April she scored a hat-trick against the same opposition in a 5–0 friendly win at Adams Park in Wycombe. When The Football Association (FA) took over running the national team in 1993, Spacey plundered four goals in the first game that September, a 10–0 win over Slovenia in Ljubljana.

She was allotted 65 when the FA announced their legacy numbers scheme to honour the 50th anniversary of England’s inaugural international.

== Coaching career ==
Spacey has a UEFA Pro Licence. She became manager of Fulham Ladies when they reverted to semi–pro status in 2003, but left in 2006 after Fulham scrapped their women's team altogether. Later that year she became a senior coach for AFC Wimbledon Ladies. Spacey later coached the England Under-16, Under-17 and Under-19 teams as well as working in the coaching departments of Arsenal and Charlton Athletic.

In November 2006 she was appointed girls and women's football development officer for the Worcestershire FA.

In December 2013, Spacey was appointed assistant to England women's manager Mark Sampson. She was part of Mark Sampson's coaching staff when the Lionesses came third at the FIFA Women's World Cup in Canada in 2015. In 2017, with Spacey as head coach, the England under-23 team won the Nordic tournament in Sweden, beating Norway 2–0 in the final match.

In July 2018, Southampton F.C. announced that Spacey would be joining as the head of girls and women's football technical department, based at the Staplewood Campus full-time and also overseeing the club's Regional Talent Club. The club said her appointment was intended to help their women's team's "future goal" of playing in the FA Women's Championship. Their initial bid, to join the inaugural Championship, was rejected by The FA.

In her first season as head coach of the senior women's team, who played in the FA Women's National League, Premier Division South, the team completed the double, winning the league title with a 18 wins from 18 games and the League Cup.

At the end of the 2023–24 season, Spacey stepped down as head coach of Southampton and took a new role leading the club's women's and girls' programme. Following the departure of Remi Allen on 28 February 2025, Spacey returned as manager on a temporary basis until the end the season.

On 29 July 2026, Southampton announced that Spacey would leave the club later that year.

== Honours ==
Spacey was inducted into the English Football Hall of Fame in 2009.

She was appointed Member of the Order of the British Empire (MBE) in the 2016 Birthday Honours for services to football.

She was awarded an Honorary Doctorate of Sport by the University of Chichester in 2022.

== Bibliography ==
- Lopez, Sue (1997). Women on the Ball: A Guide to Women's Football. London, England: Scarlet Press. ISBN 1857270169.
- White, Nick (2001). Sun, Sea and Sexy Football: The Life and Times of British Footballers Abroad. London, England: Invextus. ISBN 0954161009.
