= 2000–01 FA Women's Premier League =

FA Women's Premier League
- Season: 2000–01

The 2000–01 FA Women's Premier League season was the 10th season of the FA Women's Premier League. Croydon's women's team, champions in the previous season, were bought by Charlton Athletic and allowed to bear its name. Liverpool, founder members of the Women's Premier League, were relegated. For the first time the champions, Arsenal, qualified for the inaugural UEFA Women's Cup, the women's European club championship.

== National Division ==
FA Women's Premier League National Division
- Season: 2000–01
- Champions: Arsenal; 4th title
- Relegated: Millwall Lionesses; Liverpool
- UEFA Cup: Arsenal
- Matches: 90
- Goals: 382 (4.24 per match)
- Biggest home win: Arsenal 11–0 Liverpool (3 December 2000)
- Biggest away win: Liverpool 0–10 Arsenal (10 September 2000)
- Longest unbeaten run: Arsenal (18)
- Longest winless run: Liverpool (18)

Locations of the FA Women's Premier League National Division Teams
Locations of the FA Women's Premier League National Division Teams (Greater London)

Changes from last season:

- Blyth Spartans Kestrels were promoted from the Northern Division
- Barry Town were promoted from the Southern Division
- Aston Villa were relegated to the Northern Division
- Reading Royals were relegated to the Southern Division
- Croydon became Charlton Athletic
- Blyth Spartans Kestrels became Sunderland

=== League table ===
Pos	Team	Pld	W	D	L	GF	GA	GD	Pts	Qualification or relegation
1	Arsenal (C)	18	17	1	0	88	9	+79	52	Qualification for the UEFA Cup qualifying round
2	Doncaster Belles	18	15	0	3	58	13	+45	45	
3	Charlton Athletic (Note: Croydon made a business deal with Charlton Athletic (men's team) and changed the name accordingly.)	18	10	5	3	43	11	+32	35	
4	Everton	18	11	2	5	42	24	+18	35	
5	Tranmere Rovers	18	9	1	8	42	39	+3	28	
6	Barry Town (Note: Barry Town's men's team played in the Wales league pyramid, but the women's team was part of the English league pyramid.)	18	7	2	9	22	40	−18	23	
7	Sunderland	18	5	1	12	29	50	−21	16	
8	Southampton Saints	18	3	6	9	28	52	−24	15	
9	Millwall Lionesses (R)	18	3	2	13	17	55	−38	11	Relegation to the Southern Division
10	Liverpool (R)	18	0	0	18	13	89	−76	0	Relegation to the Northern Division

Source: FA WPL
(C) Champions; (R) Relegated

=== Results ===
Home \ Away	ARS	BAR	CHA	DON	EVE	LIV	MIL	SOU	SUN	TRA
Arsenal	—	2–1	5–0	2–1	2–1	11–0	10–0	7–1	6–0	3–0
Barry Town	1–3	—	0–4	1–3	1–5	2–1	2–1	2–0	1–0	1–4
Charlton Athletic	1–1	1–1	—	2–0	1–0	6–1	5–0	0–0	6–0	2–1
Doncaster Belles	0–1	5–0	1–0	—	4–1	3–1	8–0	3–1	4–0	6–1
Everton	1–2	4–1	1–0	1–5	—	5–0	2–0	3–0	5–2	3–1
Liverpool	0–10	2–3	0–7	0–5	1–2	—	0–1	2–4	1–4	2–4
Millwall Lionesses	0–5	0–1	0–4	1–2	2–2	7–1	—	1–2	0–3	2–1
Southampton Saints	1–9	1–1	0–0	1–2	1–1	6–1	1–1	—	2–5	3–6
Sunderland	1–3	0–2	0–4	0–4	1–3	4–0	3–0	2–2	—	4–5
Tranmere Rovers	0–4	3–1	0–0	0–2	0–2	5–0	3–1	6–1	2–0	—

Source: FA WPL
Legend: Blue = home team win; Yellow = draw; Red = away team win.

== Northern Division ==
FA Women's Premier League Northern Division
- Season: 2000–01
- Champions: Leeds United
- Promoted: Leeds United
- Relegated: Newcastle Town; Huddersfield Town
- Matches: 121
- Goals: 504 (4.17 per match)
- Biggest away win: Newcastle Town 1–10 Birmingham City

Map showing the locations of the teams in the Northern Division of the FA Women's Premier League
Map showing the locations of the teams in the Northern Division of the FA Women's Premier League

Changes from last season:

- Blyth Spartans Kestrels were promoted to the National Division
- Oldham Curzon were promoted from the Northern Combination League
- Newcastle Town were promoted from the Midland Combination League
- Aston Villa were relegated from the National Division
- Bradford City were relegated to the Northern Combination League
- Arnold Town were relegated to the Midland Combination League

=== League table ===
Pos	Team	Pld	W	D	L	GF	GA	GD	Pts	Promotion or relegation
1	Leeds United (C, P)	22	18	2	2	75	18	+57	56	Promotion to the National Division
2	Oldham Curzon	22	17	2	3	61	25	+36	53	
3	Aston Villa	22	12	5	5	52	37	+15	41	
4	Bangor City	22	10	7	5	43	27	+16	37	
5	Wolverhampton Wanderers	22	12	1	9	47	42	+5	37	
6	Birmingham City	22	9	5	8	50	42	+8	32	
7	Ilkeston Town	22	8	5	9	39	39	0	29	
8	Garswood Saints	22	8	1	13	41	60	−19	25	
9	Sheffield Wednesday	22	7	3	12	30	53	−23	24	
10	Coventry City	22	4	5	13	23	48	−25	17	
11	Newcastle Town (R)	22	4	3	15	28	62	−34	15	Relegation to the Midland Combination League
12	Huddersfield Town (R)	22	3	1	18	15	51	−36	10	Relegation to the Northern Combination League

Source: FA WPL
(C) Champions; (P) Promoted; (R) Relegated

=== Results ===
Home \ Away	ASV	BAC	BIC	CVC	GAS	HUT	ILK	LEU	NET	OLC	SHW	WOW
Aston Villa	—	1–3	2–2	1–1	4–0	4–1	3–2	0–3	1–1	3–2	1–1	8–1
Bangor City	0–0	—	4–2	3–2	2–0	1–0	3–3	0–2	7–0	0–0	4–0	2–0
Birmingham City	6–1	2–2	—	1–1	3–4	1–0	0–3	0–1	5–3	0–1	2–0	1–0
Coventry City	1–4	1–2	1–1	—	3–4	1–0	0–2	0–4	2–1	0–3	0–0	3–2
Garswood Saints	5–2	2–2	1–4	3–2	—	1–0	2–1	2–3	4–3	0–1	4–1	1–4
Huddersfield Town	0–4	0–2	0–3	2–1	2–1	—	0–1	0–3	2–1	1–4	2–3	0–5
Ilkeston Town	1–2	1–1	3–3	4–0	3–1	3–1	—	1–2	2–1	2–2	0–0	1–4
Leeds United	1–2	2–2	7–1	3–0	6–1	2–1	4–0	—	6–1	5–2	7–0	1–1
Newcastle Town	0–1	3–1	1–10	1–1	5–2	0–0	1–0	1–4	—	3–1	1–2	0–3
Oldham Curzon	4–2	2–1	2–0	4–0	1–0	2–0	6–2	2–1	4–0	—	5–0	6–4
Sheffield Wednesday	1–3	2–1	1–2	0–2	6–2	5–1	1–3	0–3	2–1	1–5	—	2–1
Wolverhampton Wanderers	1–3	2–0	4–1	3–1	2–1	3–2	2–1	0–5	2–0	0–2	3–1	—

Source: FA WPL
Legend: Blue = home team win; Yellow = draw; Red = away team win.

== Southern Division ==
FA Women's Premier League Southern Division
- Season: 2000–01
- Champions: Brighton & Hove Albion
- Promoted: Brighton & Hove Albion
- Relegated: Cardiff City; Reading Royals
- Matches: 121
- Goals: 557 (4.6 per match)
- Biggest home win: Barking 12–0; Reading Royals (10 September 2000)
- Biggest away win: Reading Royals; 1–9 Chelsea (8 October 2000)

Map showing the locations of the teams in the Southern Division of the FA Women's Premier League
Map showing the locations of the teams in the Southern Division of the FA Women's Premier League

Changes from last season:

- Barry Town were promoted to the National Division
- Chelsea were promoted from the South East Combination League
- Newport County were promoted from the South West Combination League
- Reading Royals were relegated from the National Division
- Three Bridges were relegated to the South East Combination League
- Whitehawk were relegated to the South East Combination League

=== League table ===
Pos	Team	Pld	W	D	L	GF	GA	GD	Pts	Promotion or relegation
1	Brighton & Hove Albion (C, P)	22	18	2	2	56	15	+41	56	Promotion to the National Division
2	Chelsea	22	17	4	1	66	26	+40	55	
3	Wimbledon	22	15	2	5	56	31	+25	47	
4	Barnet	22	13	3	6	66	33	+33	42	
5	Langford	22	12	3	7	47	30	+17	39	
6	Ipswich Town	22	8	3	11	47	57	−10	27	
7	Berkhamsted Town	22	8	1	13	40	51	−11	25	
8	Barking	22	8	0	14	52	54	−2	24	
9	Newport County	22	7	2	13	33	44	−11	23	
10	Wembley Mill Hill	22	6	2	14	35	64	−29	20	
11	Cardiff City (R)	22	6	0	16	34	60	−26	18	Relegation to the South West Combination League
12	Reading Royals (R)	22	2	2	18	25	92	−67	8	Relegation to the South West Combination League

Source: FA WPL
(C) Champions; (P) Promoted; (R) Relegated

=== Results ===
Home \ Away	BRK	BAR	BET	BHA	CAC	CHE	IPT	LAN	NEC	REA	WIM	WMH
Barking	—	6–3	3–1	0–2	2–1	2–4	5–1	2–3	3–2	12–0	1–3	1–2
Barnet	7–2	—	2–2	0–1	3–2	4–2	6–1	1–1	1–1	3–1	2–1	4–1
Berkhamsted Town	2–1	0–4	—	1–4	4–3	1–2	4–3	0–2	0–1	5–1	2–4	6–3
Brighton & Hove Albion	5–1	1–0	1–0	—	2–1	0–0	2–2	2–0	2–0	3–0	2–1	4–0
Cardiff City	2–4	1–7	0–1	1–3	—	1–3	1–6	3–0	2–1	4–2	1–2	4–1
Chelsea	3–0	2–1	2–1	1–0	5–2	—	2–2	1–0	4–2	2–0	3–1	3–3
Ipswich Town	4–0	1–7	2–3	2–5	3–0	1–6	—	2–2	1–3	4–1	0–3	3–0
Langford	1–0	1–0	2–0	1–5	5–1	1–4	0–1	—	1–1	5–2	1–2	5–0
Newport County	2–1	1–2	1–3	1–3	2–0	1–2	0–3	1–3	—	3–2	1–4	3–0
Reading Royals	1–3	1–4	3–1	0–4	1–2	1–9	3–0	0–7	2–4	—	2–2	2–2
Wimbledon	2–1	4–2	2–0	2–1	0–1	2–2	4–2	2–3	3–2	6–0	—	3–0
Wembley Mill Hill	3–2	0–3	5–3	1–4	3–1	0–4	0–3	0–3	2–0	7–0	2–3	—

Source: FA WPL
Legend: Blue = home team win; Yellow = draw; Red = away team win.
