= Arsenal W.F.C. =

Women's football club in London, England

Arsenal
- Full name: Arsenal Women Football Club
- Nickname: The Gunners
- Founded: 1987; 39 years ago as Arsenal Ladies
- Ground: Emirates Stadium (from 2024–25 season); Meadow Park (select competition games)
- Capacity: 60,704 (all seated); Emirates Stadium; 4,500 (1,700 seated); Meadow Park
- Coordinates: 51°33′18″N 0°6′30″W; Emirates Stadium
- Owner: Kroenke Sports & Entertainment
- Technical director: Jodie Taylor
- Head coach: Renée Slegers
- League: Women's Super League
- 2025–26: WSL, 2nd of 12
- Website: arsenal.com/women
Home colours	Away colours	Third colours

Arsenal Women Football Club, commonly referred to as just Arsenal, is an English professional women's football club based in Islington, London, England. The club plays in the Women's Super League, the top tier of English women's football. Arsenal were founded in 1987 following an initiative by Vic Akers, who became the club's first, longest-serving, and most successful manager. He guided Arsenal to continued success until his departure in 2009, winning the most top-flight matches in English football history. The club have sustained this record, and have won the most doubles and trebles in English football history. Arsenal have also completed a record seven unbeaten league seasons, setting a number of English records for longest top-flight unbeaten run, for goals scored, and points won.

Arsenal are statistically the most successful club in English women's football and among the most successful women's clubs in the world, holding the records for most titles won in each domestic competition they have played. The club have won 15 league titles, 14 Women's FA Cups, 7 Women's League Cups, 10 Women's National League Cups, 5 Women's FA Community Shields. They are the only English club to win the UEFA Women's Champions League, having won in 2007 and 2025. In 2026, they became the first club to win the FIFA Women's Champions Cup. They are also the only English club to win the continental treble while going undefeated in all competitions played that same season. In the 2006–07 season, the club became the first in the history of women's football to achieve the continental European sextuple.

Arsenal play the majority of their home matches at the Emirates Stadium, with some fixtures also held at Meadow Park in Borehamwood. In the 2023–24 season, Arsenal broke the WSL record attendance three times in total.

On 10 June 2025, the club announced that Emirates Stadium would host all 11 Women's Super League home matches for the 2025–26 season, with plans for UEFA Women's Champions League knockout fixtures to also be played at the Emirates, subject to progression from the league phase.

== History ==
=== 1987–2009: Founding and early success ===
Arsenal Football Club had explored the idea of a women's team from as early as the 1960s, when local teams asked for financial support in an attempt to turn semi-professional; the Ladies of Islington notably sought support from the club, but were turned down by the Arsenal hierarchy in 1965. Following The Football Association's (FA) decision to rescind the ban on women's football in England in 1969, the game's popularity increased following the creation of official league matches and knock-out competition organised by the Women's Football Association (WFA).

Millwall Lionesses had become the first women's team to affiliate with a prominent men's team. The Rotherhithe-based side was founded in 1971 and pioneered a successful youth community scheme for young women with support from their parent club. Arsenal looked to replicate Millwall's success and founded their own women's team and youth programmes for girls by amalgamating with local team Aylesbury Ladies. Arsenal Ladies Football Club was formed in 1987 by long-term Arsenal men's kit manager Vic Akers, and he was appointed as the amateur side's initial manager. With the support of then vice chairman David Dein, Akers' plea for resources such as playing boots, the men's team coach and the use of training facilities were often answered in a period where financial support for the women's game was scarce; Arsenal thus dominated the women's game in England during the 1990s and 2000s.

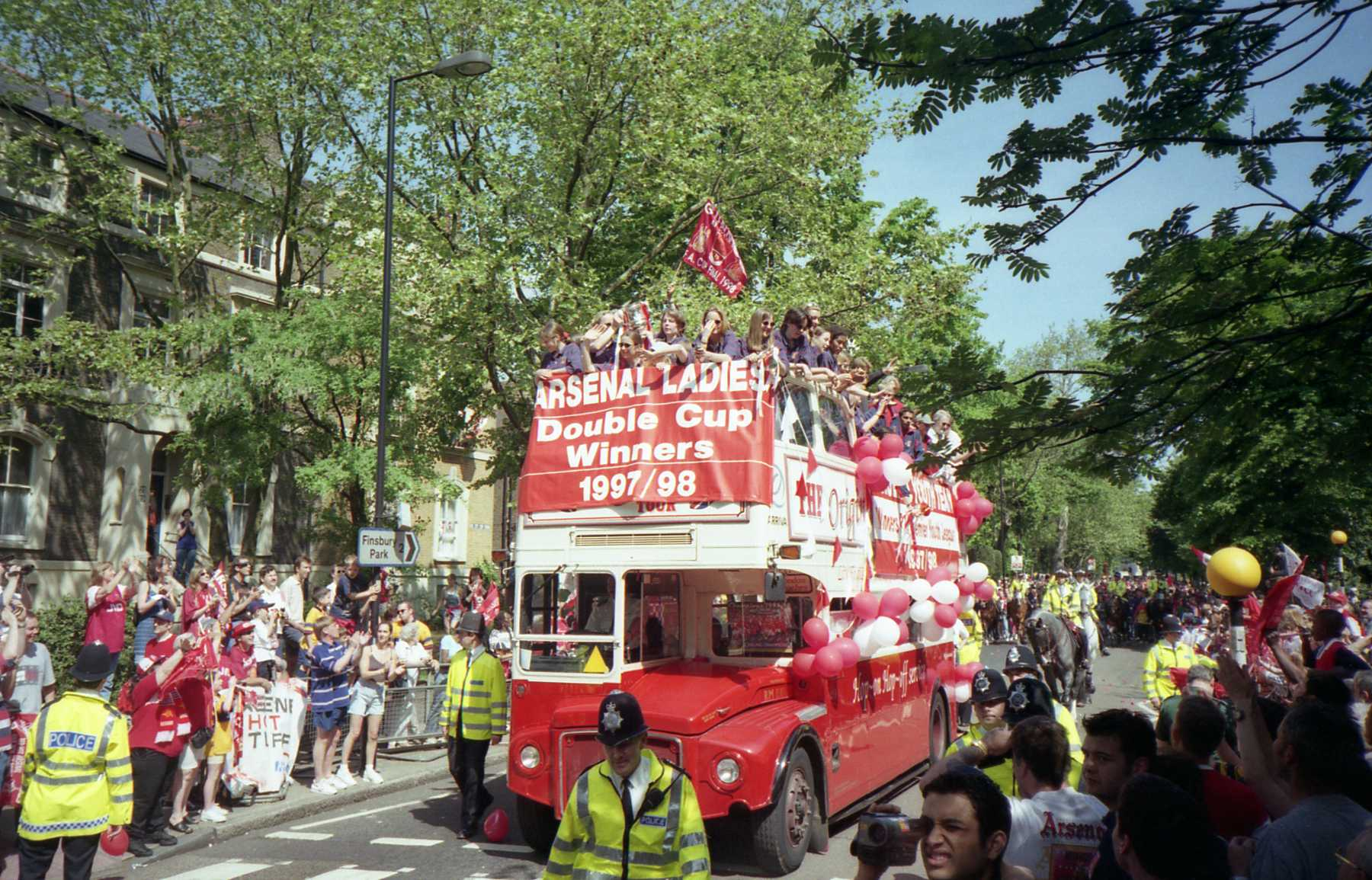
Arsenal celebrate a Cup double in 1998

They won their first major honour, the Women's League Cup, in the 1991–92 season and won promotion to the FA Women's Premier League from the FA Women's National League South in the same year. A season later, they won the top division title at the first time of asking.

This began a period of sustained dominance for the club, who soon permanently moved into Meadow Park in Borehamwood, Hertfordshire, in a groundshare agreement with non-league side Boreham Wood. Following the successes of the men's team, Arsenal made a conscious effort to brand women's football as equitable. Over the next 20 years, Arsenal approached all facets of the game, such as training, tactics, scouting, and finance, with the goal of growing the club and winning trophies. Throughout the 1990s and 2000s, Arsenal topped the Premier League for many seasons, boasting academy graduates like Marieanne Spacey and Faye White, as well as spending the club's income on stars like Emma Byrne, enabling the club to win a slew of trophies. Akers stepped down as manager of Arsenal's Women's team during the summer of 1997 to become kit manager for the men's team. Terry Howard took charge of the team for the 1997–98 season but Akers returned in 1998–99 following Howard's departure. The club became semi-professional in 2002.

Under Akers' stewardship, Arsenal enjoyed unilateral domestic success, as the club claimed 11 league titles, nine FA Women's Cup titles, ten FA Women's Premier League Cup titles, and five FA Women's Community Shield wins. This included seven straight league wins from the 2003–04 season to 2009–10 season, as well as six unbeaten campaigns. Akers led the team to the most successful club season in English women's football in the 2006–07 season as the team won every competition available to them, including the UEFA Women's Cup. The win marked Arsenal's only European trophy and was the first time an English club had won the competition. This unique sextuple was recognized with The Committee Award by the Sports Journalists' Association in the 2007 Sports Journalists' Awards.

Akers also led the team to a number of English women's football records, including a six-year league unbeaten run from October 2003 to March 2009, marking 108 games without defeat. During that spell, Arsenal won a record 51 league games in a row, between November 2005 and April 2008. Akers retired from management following a domestic treble in the 2008–09 season.

=== 2009–present: Post-Akers and the WSL ===
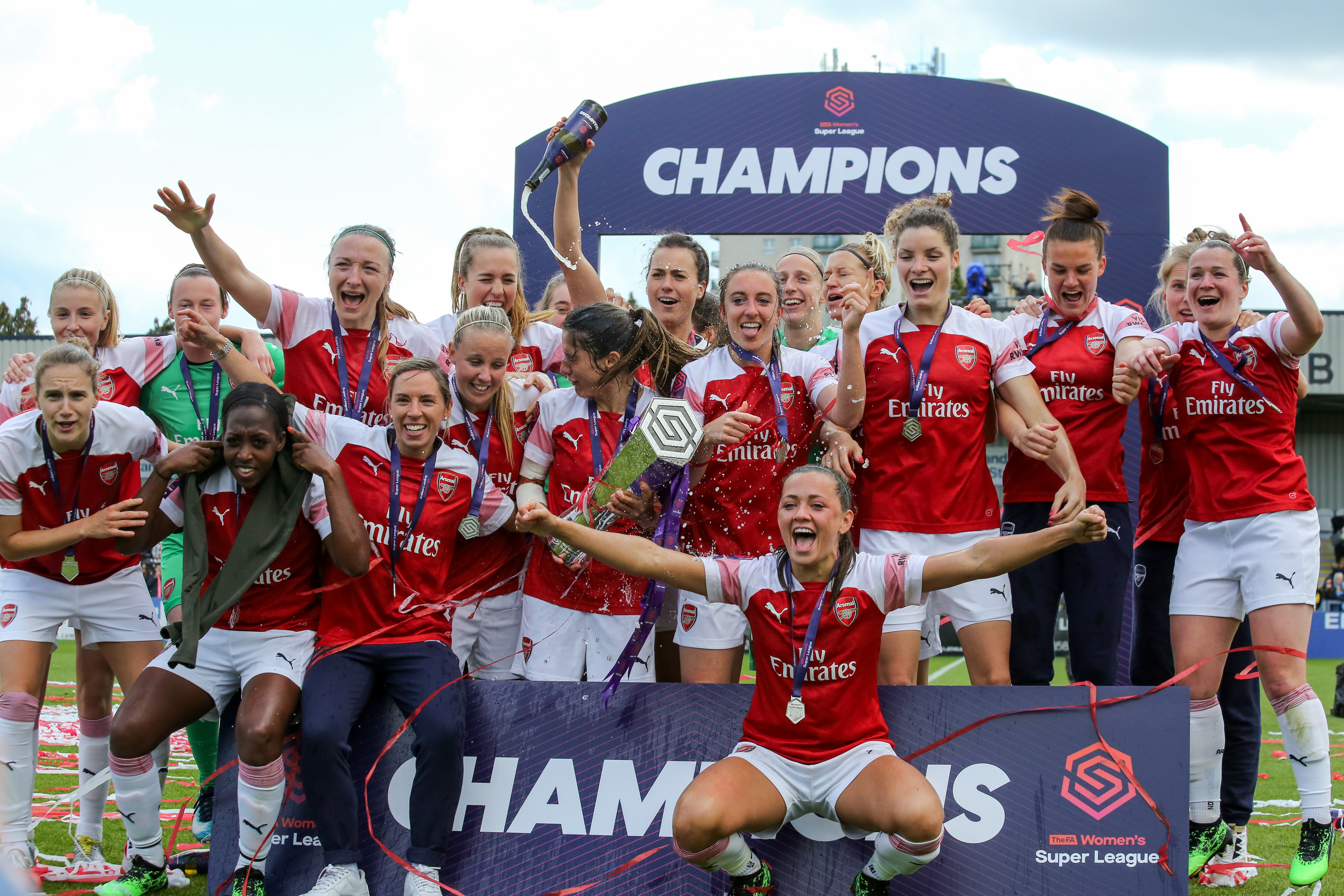
Arsenal players celebrate winning the 2018–19 FA WSL title

Akers was succeeded by Tony Gervaise, who resigned in February 2010 after only eight months in charge, suggesting his position had been undermined by outside interference. In an unusual development, reserve coach Laura Harvey became first-team manager and Gervaise became reserve coach. This appointment marked the club's first female coach in any capacity.

After a year break in play in preparation for a reformatted league, Arsenal were named as founder members of the FA Women's Super League, which commenced in the spring of 2011. Arsenal won the inaugural season, marking their eighth consecutive English title, and secured another domestic double by also winning the FA Cup. After a two-year period without a league triumph, Shelley Kerr was announced as Harvey's successor in 2013. Under her management, the club won two FA Women's Cups, including a win in 2014 two weeks after the men's team won the 2014 FA Cup, completing a rare FA Cup double for the club. But after a poor run of form which saw Arsenal gain only one point from the opening four league matches of the 2014 season, including exits from the Champions League to minnows Birmingham and a shock loss to Reading, Kerr resigned. She was replaced by Pedro Losa. Losa led the team to the 2015 FA WSL Cup and the 2016 FA Women's Cup. Moreover, he helped to rebuild the squad, notably recruiting younger stars like Daniëlle van de Donk, Kim Little, Beth Mead and Vivianne Miedema. Losa also brought through youngsters like Leah Williamson. However, Losa left following a poor start to the 2017-18 season and was replaced by Joe Montemurro.

In July 2017, the club rebranded as Arsenal Women Football Club, in a move described by Arsenal as "clear signal of togetherness and unity", and to retain the progressive ethos of the club. Utilizing the core Losa helped build, Montemurro led Arsenal to the 2018–19 Women's Super League title with a game to spare. The win marked their first title in seven years, and the club's return to the Champions League for the first time in five years. Montemurro left the club at the end of the 2020–21 season.

Following the resignation of Montemurro, the club appointed Jonas Eidevall as head coach of Arsenal. On 24 September 2022, the North London derby at the Emirates Stadium recorded an attendance figure of 47,367, the highest ever for a WSL match. Arsenal won the match 4–0. On 5 March 2023, Arsenal defeated Chelsea 3–1 in the Women's League Cup final to win their first trophy since 2019. Arsenal repeated the feat the following year, defeating Chelsea 1–0 after extra time to win their ninth Women's League Cup title.

In the 2023–24 season, the WSL record attendance was broken three times at the Emirates; against Liverpool in September with 54,115, Chelsea in December with 59,042, followed by Manchester United in February with 60,160. In March, the Emirates again sold out for the North London derby against Tottenham Hotspur with 60,050 in attendance, becoming the second biggest crowd in WSL history.

On 15 October 2024, during the 2024-25 season, Jonas Eidevall resigned as manager of Arsenal following a string of poor results and fan scrutiny. On the same day, it was announced that the ex-Dutch national player Renée Slegers was promoted from assistant coach to interim head coach of the first team. On 17 January 2025, Slegers was announced as the permanent head coach until the end of the 2025/26 season. On 27 April 2025, Arsenal qualified for their first UEFA Women's Champions League final in 18 years, after beating Lyon 5–3 on aggregate. In the final on 24 May, Arsenal defeated Barcelona 1–0 to win their second Champions League title.

On 7 August 2025, following their Champions League win, 7 of Arsenal's players were announced as nominees for the 2025 Ballon d'Or Féminin: Mariona Caldentey, Steph Catley, Emily Fox, Chloe Kelly, Frida Maanum, Alessia Russo, and Leah Williamson.

Alongside these nominations, Head Coach Renée Slegers was announced as a nominee for the Ballon d'Or Coach of the Year award, Academy graduate Michelle Agyemang was announced as a nominee for the Women's Kopa Trophy, goalkeeper Daphne van Domselaar was nominated for the Yashin Trophy and Arsenal were nominated for Best Club of the Year.

On 1 February 2026, Arsenal won the inaugural FIFA Women's Champions Cup against Corinthians, in a 3–2 win.

== Kits ==
=== Kit suppliers and shirt sponsors ===
Period	Kit manufacturer	Shirt sponsor (chest)	Shirt sponsor (sleeve)
1987–1994	Adidas	JVC	None
1994–1999	Nike	JVC	None
1999–2002	Nike	Dreamcast; Sega	None
2002–2006	Nike	O2	None
2006–2014	Nike	Fly Emirates	None
2014–2018	Puma	Fly Emirates	None
2018–2019	Puma	Fly Emirates	Visit Rwanda
2019–	Adidas	Fly Emirates	Visit Rwanda

== Stadium ==
Arsenal previously played the majority of their home matches at Meadow Park, home of National League side Boreham Wood, in Borehamwood, Hertfordshire. Select matches were played at the Emirates Stadium in London – the home of the men's first team.

In the 2022–23 season, the club had the highest home attendance in the WSL, with an average of 15,046 fans in attendance per match. The average was taken from matches hosted at both Meadow Park and Emirates Stadium across the season. During the 2023–24 season, Arsenal played five of their matches at the Emirates and the remainder at Meadow Park, averaging an attendance of 30,017 per match.

Across the 2024–25 season, the Emirates was the main home of the club. The team played 9 WSL matches and all Champions League matches at the Emirates, with the remainder of matches and one Champions League group stage match (moved due to a fixture clash with Arsenal Men competing in the EFL Cup on 18 December) played at Meadow Park.

In June 2025, Arsenal announced that all 11 of their WSL home fixtures and any Champions League knockout matches in the 2025–26 season would be played at the Emirates Stadium, marking the club's first full WSL campaign at the ground. Matches in the Champions League league phase and domestic cup competitions will continue to be held at Meadow Park.

== Players ==
=== First-team squad ===
As of 3 September 2026

Note: Flags indicate national team as defined under FIFA eligibility rules; some limited exceptions apply. Players may hold more than one non-FIFA nationality.

No.	Pos.	Nation	Player
1	GK	NED	Daphne van Domselaar
2	DF	USA	Emily Fox
3	DF	ENG	Lotte Wubben-Moy
4	MF	ENG	Georgia Stanway
5	DF	FRA	Élisa De Almeida
6	DF	ENG	Leah Williamson (vice-captain)
7	DF	AUS	Steph Catley (3rd captain)
8	MF	ESP	Mariona Caldentey
9	FW	AUS	Caitlin Foord
10	MF	SCO	Kim Little (captain)
11	FW	CAN	Olivia Smith
12	MF	NOR	Frida Maanum
14	MF	SUI	Géraldine Reuteler
16	GK	ESP	Misa Rodríguez

No.	Pos.	Nation	Player
17	FW	ENG	Michelle Agyemang
18	FW	ENG	Chloe Kelly
19	FW	GER	Lisa Baum
22	DF	ESP	Ona Batlle
23	FW	ENG	Alessia Russo
24	DF	ENG	Taylor Hinds
25	FW	SWE	Stina Blackstenius
26	DF	ENG	Katie Reid
28	GK	GER	Anneke Borbe
29	FW	GER	Selina Cerci
31	DF	SWE	Smilla Holmberg
32	MF	AUS	Kyra Cooney-Cross
38	MF	ENG	Maddy Earl
40	GK	DEN	Isabella Damm

=== Out on loan ===
Note: Flags indicate national team as defined under FIFA eligibility rules; some limited exceptions apply. Players may hold more than one non-FIFA nationality.

No.	Pos.	Nation	Player
33	FW	ENG	Jessie Gale (at Newcastle United until 30 June 2027)
36	DF	ENG	Cecily Wellesley-Smith (at FC Rosengård until 31 December 2026)
44	DF	ENG	Sophie Harwood (at Sheffield United until 30 June 2027)

=== Professional Game Academy ===
Arsenal used to operate a reserve team, which was mainly formed from Academy players. The reserves won four FA Women's Premier Reserve League titles and five FA Women's Premier Reserve League Cups in their history. The reserve team was replaced by the FA WSL Academy scheme in 2018-19 which was then replaced by the Professional Game Academy setup. The PGA is a revised player pathway which replaced the FA WSL Academy in 2023. The PGA structure provides young players with the opportunity to be selected as part of a professional club's programme, combining football development with their education.

Arsenal Women have a Category 1 PGA License, which means that they have both an Under-21 and Under-16 team. The players listed here are part of the PGA U-21 setup and have featured in at least one match-day squad for the senior side.

Note: Flags indicate national team as defined under FIFA eligibility rules; some limited exceptions apply. Players may hold more than one non-FIFA nationality.

No.	Pos.	Nation	Player
50	FW	ENG	Abi Conway
55	FW	ENG	Kyri Teer-Hutchins

=== Dual registration loan ===
Dual registration loans allow young players to gain senior team experience at lower league clubs, usually Women's National League, whilst also being eligible for their Academy or even senior team games.

=== Academy Development Registration ===
Academy Development Registration (ADR) loans were introduced during the 2025-26 football season, replacing the older dual registration loan scheme. Former Arsenal defender Niamh Peacock became the first player to sign an ADR loan in the WSL2 in January 2026 when she signed for Portsmouth FC.

Note: Flags indicate national team as defined under FIFA eligibility rules; some limited exceptions apply. Players may hold more than one non-FIFA nationality.

No.	Pos.	Nation	Player
53	GK	ENG	Amy Liddiard (at London Bees until 30 June 2027)
67	MF	ENG	Bryony Brodie (at Norwich City until 30 June 2027)

=== Former players ===
For notable current and former players, see Category:Arsenal W.F.C. players.

== Management and staff ==
=== Current staff ===
As of 31 July 2026

Position	Name
Director of women's football	Clare Wheatley
Technical Director	Jodie Taylor
Head coach	Renée Slegers
Senior assistant coach	Aaron D'Antino
Assistant coaches	Kelly Smith
Assistant coaches	Nikita Runnacles
Assistant coaches	Elliot Alllum
Goalkeeper coach	Sebastian Barton
Strength and conditioning coach	Josh Booth
Strength and conditioning coach	Jack Clover
Player care manager	Niamh Coyle
Head of sports medicine and sports science	Gary Lewin
Rehabilitation physiotherapist	Chloe Martin
Doctor	Matthew Ogunsanya
Lead sport scientist	Kate Keaney
Lead physiotherapist	Rose Emsley
Sports psychologist	Matt Domville
Performance nutritionist	Stephanie Ridley
Head of analysis	Melissa Phillips
Analyst	Sophie Bone
Analyst	Frank Madden
Analyst	James Mitchell
Head of women's football operations	Holly Skinner
Player pathway manager	Pauline MacDonald

=== Managerial history ===
Dates	Name
1987–1997	(England) Vic Akers
1997–1998	(England) Terry Howard
1998–2009	(England) Vic Akers
2009–2010	(Scotland) Tony Gervaise
2010–2013	(England) Laura Harvey
2013–2014	(Scotland) Shelley Kerr
2014–2017	(Spain) Pedro Martínez Losa
2017–2021	(Australia) Joe Montemurro
2021–2024	(Sweden) Jonas Eidevall
2024–	(Netherlands) Renée Slegers

== Honours ==
Arsenal W.F.C. honours
Type	Competition	Titles	Seasons
Domestic	English Football Championship (Note: Including the WFA National League Premier Division (1991–1994), FA Premier League National Division (1995–2010), and the Women's Super League (since 2011))	15	1992–93, 1994–95, 1996–97, 2000–01, 2001–02, 2003–04, 2004–05, 2005–06, 2006–07, 2007–08, 2008–09, 2009–10, 2011, 2012, 2018–19
Domestic	FA Women's Premier League South (Note: Arsenal played in the competition when it was a part of the country's joint second division, in conjunction with the northern section. Today the competition is a part of the country's third division and is called the FA Women's National League South.)	1	1991–92
Domestic	Women's FA Cup	14	1992–93, 1994–95, 1997–98, 1998–99, 2000–01, 2003–04, 2005–06, 2006–07, 2007–08, 2008–09, 2010–11, 2012–13, 2013–14, 2015–16
Domestic	FA Women's League Cup	7	2011, 2012, 2013, 2015, 2017–18, 2022–23, 2023–24
Domestic	FA Women's National League Cup	10	1991–92, 1992–93, 1993–94, 1997–98, 1998–99, 1999–2000, 2000–01, 2004–05, 2006–07, 2008–09
Domestic	Women's FA Community Shield	5	2000, (Note: The 2000 FA Women's Charity Shield was shared with Charlton Athletic) 2001, 2005, 2006, 2008
Continental	UEFA Women's Champions League	2	2006–07, 2024–25
Worldwide	FIFA Women's Champions Cup	1	2026
Regional	London County FA Women's Cup	10	1994–95, 1995–96, 1996–97, 1999–2000, 2003–04, 2006–07, 2007–08, 2008–09, 2009–10, 2010–11

- record

At the 2025 Ballon d’Or ceremony, Arsenal Women were named Women's Club of the Year, in recognition of their performances in domestic and European competitions during the 2024–25 season.

== Further information ==
- Donlevy, Michael (24 September 2022). "The birth of Arsenal Women". Arsenal F.C.
