= 1999–2000 Arsenal L.F.C. season =

English women's football club season

Arsenal Ladies
1999–2000 season
- Chairman: Peter Hill-Wood
- Manager: Vic Akers
- Stadium: Meadow Park
- Premier League: Third Place
- FA Cup: Semi Final
- Premier League Cup: Winners
- London County Cup: Winners
- Top goalscorer: League: Marianne Spacey (16); All: Marianne Spacey (31)
- Biggest win: 16–0 (vs Leyton Orent (H), London County Cup)
- Biggest defeat: 0–2 (vs Doncaster Belles (A), Premier League, 05 September 1999)
Home colours	Away colours

The 1999–2000 season was Arsenal Ladies Football Club's 13th season since forming in 1987. The club participated in the National Division of the FA Women's Premier League, finishing in third place. They won the Premier League Cup by defeating Croydon 4–1 in the Final, but lost to Doncaster Belles in the FA Cup. They also won the London County Cup, triumphing 3–0 over Wimbledon in the Final.

== Squad information & statistics ==
=== First team squad ===
Squad statistics correct as of May 2000

Name	Date of birth (age)	Since	Signed from
Goalkeepers
(Republic of Ireland) Emma Byrne	14 June 1979 (aged 21)	2000	(Denmark) Fortuna Hjørring
(England) Jasmine Cripps	4 November 1985 (aged 14)	1998	(England) Arsenal Academy
(England) Lesley Higgs	25 October 1965 (aged 34)	1997	(England) Wembley
(England) Aman Dosanj	9 September 1983 (aged 16)	1999	(England) Southampton Saints
Defenders
(England) Kirsty Pealling	14 April 1975 (aged 25)	1987	(England) Arsenal Academy
(Scotland) Pauline MacDonald	17 April 1975 (aged 25)	1999	(Scotland) Cumbernauld United
(England) Faye White	2 February 1978 (aged 22)	1996	(England) Three Bridges
(England) Clare Wheatley	4 February 1971 (aged 29)	1995	(England) Chelsea
(England) Carol Harwood	1 December 1965 (aged 34)	1997	(England) Wembley
(England) Casey Stoney	13 May 1982 (aged 18)	1999	(England) Chelsea
(England) Kim Jerray-Silver	6 October 1977 (aged 22)	1996	(England) Wembley
(England) Georgie Adams	7 November 1984 (aged 15)	1999	(England) Bushey
(England) Jenny Canty	22 March 1976 (aged 24)	1991	(England) Limehouse
(England) Vicki Slee	9 March 1973 (aged 27)	1991	(England) Millwall Lionesses
(England) Sarah Woolliscroft	24 December 1974 (aged 25)	1999	(England) Ilkeston Town
(England) Kirsty Hewitson	17 May 1975 (aged 25)	1999	(England) Barnet
(England) Kelley Few	17 October 1971 (aged 28)	1991	(England) Romford
(Republic of Ireland) Tammy Scrivens	11 August 1978 (aged 21)	1997	(England) Mill Hill United
Midfielders
(England) Sian Williams (c)	2 February 1968 (aged 32)	1990	(England) Millwall Lionesses
(Republic of Ireland) Ciara Grant	17 May 1978 (aged 22)	1998	(Republic of Ireland) St Patrick's Athletic
(England) Tina Mapes	21 January 1971 (aged 29)	1997	(England) Croydon
(England) Emma Coss	9 May 1979 (aged 21)	1992	(England) Arsenal Academy
(Republic of Ireland) Carol Conlon	9 January 1979 (aged 21)	1998	(Republic of Ireland) St Patrick's Athletic
(England) Linda Watt	19 May 1973 (aged 27)	1995	(England) Watford
(Scotland) Holly Roberts		1999	(England) Arsenal Academy
(England) Jo Gardiner		1999	(England) Arsenal Academy
Forwards
(England) Angela Banks	23 December 1975 (aged 24)	1999	(England) Whitehawk
(England) Ellen Maggs	16 February 1983 (aged 17)	1997	(England) Arsenal Academy
(England) Marieanne Spacey	13 February 1966 (aged 34)	1993	(England) Wimbledon
(England) Rachel Yankey	1 December 1979 (aged 20)	1996	(England) Mill Hill United
(England) Justine Lorton	11 March 1974 (aged 26)	1998	(England) Millwall Lionesses
(Republic of Ireland) Grainne Kierans	20 September 1978 (aged 21)	1999	(Republic of Ireland) St Patrick's Athletic
(England) Sheuneen Ta	21 July 1985 (aged 14)	1997	(England) Arsenal Academy
(England) Nina Downham	31 December 1980 (aged 19)	1998	(England) Millwall Lionesses
(England) Mikaela Howell	12 July 1988 (aged 11)	1999	(England) Southampton Women
Unknown
Kate Baruth		1999	

=== Appearances and goals ===
Name	PLND		FA Cup		PL Cup		LC Cup		Total	
Name	Apps	Goals	Apps	Goals	Apps	Goals	Apps	Goals	Apps	Goals
Goalkeepers
(England) Lesley Higgs	12	0	2	0	3	0	1+1	0	18+1	0
(Republic of Ireland) Emma Byrne	5	0	1	0	2	0	2	0	10	0
(England) Aman Dosanj	1	0	1	0	0	0	0	0	2	0
(England) Jasmine Cripps	0	0	0	0	0	0	0	0	0	0
Defenders
(England) Kirsty Pealling	17	3	4	0	5	1	2+1	0	28+1	4
(Scotland) Pauline MacDonald	5	0	2	0	1	0	1	0	9	0
(England) Faye White	15	3	4	1	4	0	2	1	25	5
(England) Clare Wheatley	16	1	4	0	5	3	3	0	28	4
(England) Carol Harwood	17	0	3	0	4	0	2	2	26	2
(England) Casey Stoney	12+2	2	3+1	0	4	0	2+1	2	21+4	4
(England) Kim Jerray-Silver	1+1	0	0	0	0	0	0	0	1+1	0
(England) Georgie Adams	0	0	0	0	0	0	0	0	0	0
(England) Jenny Canty	0	0	0	0	0	0	1	0	1	0
(England) Vicki Slee	0	0	0	0	0	0	0	0	0	0
(England) Sarah Woolliscroft	0+1	0	0	0	0	0	1	0	1+1	0
(England) Kirsty Hewitson	0	0	0	0	0	0	1	0	1	0
(England) Kelley Few	4+7	0	0+3	1	1+3	1	2	0	7+13	2
(Republic of Ireland) Tammy Scrivens	0	0	0	0	0	0	0	0	0	0
Midfielders
(England) Sian Williams (c)	18	2	4	0	5	0	2	0	29	2
(Republic of Ireland) Ciara Grant	11	5	4	2	4	2	2	2	21	11
(England) Tina Mapes	2+3	0	0	0	1+1	1	1	0	4+4	1
(England) Emma Coss	0+3	0	0+1	0	0+1	0	1	0	1+5	0
(Republic of Ireland) Carol Conlon	0+3	0	0	0	0+1	0	0	0	0+4	0
(England) Linda Watt	0	0	0	0	0	0	0	0	0	0
(Scotland) Holly Roberts	0	0	0	0	0	0	1	0	1	0
(England) Jo Gardiner	0+1	0	0	0	0	0	0	0	0+1	0
Forwards
(England) Angela Banks	16	16	4	6	5	7	1	1	26	30
(England) Ellen Maggs	0+3	0	0	0	0+1	0	0+1	0	0+5	0
(England) Marianne Spacey	17	18	4	9	5	4	1+1	2	22+1	33
(England) Rachel Yankey	17	16	4	3	4+1	3	1+1	3	26+2	25
(England) Justine Lorton	12+6	5	0+3	0	2+3	2	2	0	16+12	7
(Republic of Ireland) Grainne Kierans	0	0	0+1	0	0	0	0	0	0+1	0
(England) Sheuneen Ta	0	0	0	0	0	0	0+1	0	0+1	0
(England) Nina Downham	0+1	0	0	0	0	0	1	0	1+1	0
(England) Mikaela Howell	0	0	0	0	0	0	0	0	0	0
Unknown
Kate Baruth	0	0	0	0	0	0	0	0	0	0

=== Goalscorers ===
Rank	Position	Name	PLND	FA Cup	PL Cup	LC Cup	Total
1	FW	(England) Marianne Spacey	18	9	4	2	33
2	FW	(England) Angela Banks	16	6	7	1	30
3	FW	(England) Rachel Yankey	16	3	3	3	25
4	MF	(Republic of Ireland) Ciara Grant	5	2	2	2	11
5	FW	(England) Justine Lorton	5	0	2	0	7
6	DF	(England) Faye White	3	1	0	1	5
7	DF	(England) Kirsty Pealling	3	0	1	0	4
7	DF	(England) Casey Stoney	2	0	0	2	4
9	DF	(England) Clare Wheatley	1	0	3	0	4
10	MF	(England) Sian Williams	2	0	0	0	2
10	DF	(England) Carol Harwood	0	0	0	2	2
10	DF	(England) Kelley Few	0	1	1	0	2
13	MF	(England) Tina Mapes	0	0	1	0	1
Own goal			2	0	0	0	2
Total			73	22	24	13	132

=== Clean sheets ===
Rank	Name	PLND	FA Cup	PL Cup	LC Cup	Total
1	(England) Lesley Higgs	5	1	1	2	9
2	(Republic of Ireland) Emma Byrne	3	0	0	0	3
3	(England) Aman Dosanj	0	0	0	0	0
Total		8	1	1	2	12

== Transfers, loans and other signings ==
=== Transfers in ===
Announcement date	Position	Player	From club
1999	GK	(England) Aman Dosanj	(England) Southampton Saints
1999	DF	(England) Sarah Woolliscroft	(England) Ilkeston Town
1999	FW	(England) Angela Banks	(England) Whitehawk
1999	FW	(Republic of Ireland) Grainne Kierans	(Republic of Ireland) St Patrick's Athletic
1999	DF	(England) Kirsty Hewitson	(England) Barnet
1999	DF	(England) Casey Stoney	(England) Chelsea
1999	FW	(England) Mikaela Howell	(England) Southampton Women
1999	DF	(England) Georgie Adams	(England) Bushey
1999		Kate Baruth	
December 1999	DF	(Scotland) Pauline MacDonald	(Scotland) Cumbernauld United
2000	GK	(Republic of Ireland) Emma Byrne	(Denmark) Fortuna Hjørring

=== Transfers out ===
Announcement date	Position	Player	To club
1999	DF	(England) Kim Jerray-Silver	(England) Fulham
1999	GK	(England) Sarah Reed	(United States) Lynn Fighting Knights
1999	MF	(Australia) Taryn Rockall	(Australia) NSW Sapphires
1999	MF	(England) Tina Mapes	(England) Croydon
1999	MF	(England) Beth Lovell	(England) Wimbledon
1999	GK	(England) Abbie Yeoman	(England) Crystal Palace
1999	DF	(United States) Felicity Smith	(United States) Nichols College
1999	MF	(Romania) Maria Ward	
1999	GK	Carol Scrilloff	
September 1999	FW	(England) Natasha Daly	(England) Wembley Mill Hill
2000	DF	(Republic of Ireland) Tammy Scrivens	(England) Barnet
2000	FW	(England) Justine Lorton	(Iceland) Stjarnan

=== Loans out ===
Announcement date	Position	Player	To club
2000	FW	(England) Rachel Yankey	(Canada) Laval Dynamites

== Club ==
=== Kit ===
Supplier: Nike / Sponsor: Dreamcast / Sega

Home	Away

== Competitions ==
=== Overall record ===
Competition	First match	Last match	Starting round	Final position	Record							
Competition	First match	Last match	Starting round	Final position	Pld	W	D	L	GF	GA	GD	Win %
FA Women's Premier League National Division	29 August 1999	4 May 2000	Matchday 1	3rd	18	13	2	3	73	13	+60	72.22
FA Women's Cup	9 January 2000	25 March 2000	Fourth round	Semi-finals	4	3	0	1	22	4	+18	75.00
FA Women's Premier League Cup	26 September 1999	1 April 2000	First round	Winners	5	5	0	0	25	4	+21	100.00
London County Cup	17 October 1999	19 March 2000	Second round	Winners	3	3	0	0	27	1	+26	100.00
Total					30	24	2	4	147	22	+125	80.00

Last updated: 23 May 2026
Source: FA WPL

=== FA Women's Premier League National Division ===
==== Partial league table ====
Pos	Team	Pld	W	D	L	GF	GA	GD	Pts
1	Croydon (C)	18	15	2	1	58	13	+45	47
2	Doncaster Belles	18	15	1	2	66	14	+52	46
3	Arsenal	18	13	2	3	73	13	+60	41
4	Everton	18	10	3	5	62	31	+31	33
5	Tranmere Rovers	18	9	1	8	43	36	+7	28

Source: FA WPL
(C) Champions

==== Results summary ====
Overall								Home						Away					
Pld	W	D	L	GF	GA	GD	Pts	W	D	L	GF	GA	GD	W	D	L	GF	GA	GD
18	13	2	3	73	13	+60	41	9	0	0	48	3	+45	4	2	3	25	10	+15

==== Results by matchday ====
Matchday	1	2	3	4	5	6	7	8	9	10	11	12	13	14	15	16	17	18
Ground	A	A	A	H	A	H	H	H	H	A	H	A	A	A	H	H	A	H
Result	L	L	W	W	L	W	W	W	W	W	W	W	D	D	W	W	W	W
Position	6	8	7	5	6	4	4	3	3	3	2	3	3	3	3	3	3	2

Source: FA WPL
W = Win; D = Draw; L = Loss

==== Matches ====
29 August 1999 1	Tranmere Rovers	3–2	Arsenal	Heswall
14:00 BST	Smith; Copeland; Dunn 86'	Report	Spacey; Lorton	Stadium: Gayton Park; Referee: Mr S.C. Davies (Birmingham)

5 September 1999 2	Doncaster Belles	2–0	Arsenal	Dunscroft
14:00 BST	Garside 38'; Duncan 75'	Report		Stadium: Welfare Ground; Referee: Ms. N. Hare

12 September 1999 3	Reading Royals	0–3	Arsenal	Reading
		Report	Spacey; Yankey; Lorton	Stadium: Rivermoor Stadium

19 September 1999 4	Arsenal	3–0	Southampton Saints	Borehamwood
14:30 BST	Lorton; Williams 46'; Grant	Report		Stadium: Meadow Park; Referee: Mrs Frampton

3 October 1999 5	Croydon	1–0	Arsenal	Croydon
14:00 GMT	Walker 35'	Report		Stadium: Croydon Sports Arena

24 October 1999 6	Arsenal	5–0	Everton	Borehamwood
14:30 BST	Yankey 10'; Banks; Grant	Report		Stadium: Meadow Park

7 November 1999 7	Arsenal	10–1	Aston Villa	Borehamwood
14:30 GMT	White; Spacey (pen.); Banks; Yankey	Report	Goal	Stadium: Meadow Park; Referee: Mr. M. Ford

14 November 1999 8	Arsenal	2–1	Doncaster Belles	Borehamwood
14:30 GMT	Yankey 45'; Spacey 75'	Report	Exley 40'	Stadium: Meadow Park

21 November 1999 9	Arsenal	9–0	Reading Royals	Borehamwood
14:30 GMT	Yankey; Banks; Grant; Spacey; Pealling; Williams (o.g.)	Report		Stadium: Meadow Park

5 December 1999 10	Aston Villa	1–8	Arsenal	Castle Vale
	Goal	Report	Spacey (pen.); Williams; Pealling; Grant; Lorton	Stadium: Castle Vale Stadium

12 December 1999 11	Arsenal	8–1	Tranmere Rovers	Borehamwood
14:30 GMT	Banks 7', 11', 47'; Grant; Yankey; Stoney; Pealling	Report	Goal	Stadium: Meadow Park

13 February 2000 12	Southampton Saints	1–3	Arsenal	Eastleigh
	Ludlow	Report	Yankey; Spacey	Stadium: Stoneham

12 March 2000 13	Everton	1–1	Arsenal	Crosby
	McDougall 75'	Report	Yankey 43'	Stadium: Rossett Park

9 April 2000 14	Liverpool	1–1	Arsenal	Fairfield
	75' (pen.)	Report	Spacey 60'; Wheatley (red card) 75'	Stadium: Merseyside Police Ground

16 April 2000 15	Arsenal	2–0	Liverpool	Potters Bar
14:00 BST	Spacey; Yankey	Report		Stadium: The Lantern Stadium

24 April 2000 16	Arsenal	6–0	Millwall Lionesses	Highbury
17:30 BST	Banks 9', 90+1'; Yankey 16'; Spacey 26'; White 31'; Stoney 39'	Report		Stadium: Highbury; Referee: Mr. Butterworth

30 April 2000 17	Millwall Lionesses	0–7	Arsenal	East Dulwich
14:00 BST		Report	Banks; Yankey; (o.g.); White	Stadium: Champion Hill; Referee: Wendy Toms

4 May 2000 18	Arsenal	3–0	Croydon	Borehamwood
17:30 GMT	Wheatley; Lorton; Spacey	Report		Stadium: Meadow Park

=== FA Women's Cup ===
9 January 2000 Fourth round	Cardiff City	1–8	Arsenal
	Goal	Report	Banks 4'; Spacey 25'; Yankey 26'; Few	Referee: S.M. Moggs

6 February 2000 Fifth round	Arsenal	5–0	Reading Royals	Borehamwood
14:30 GMT	Yankey; Banks; Spacey; Grant	Report		Stadium: Meadow Park; Referee: Mr. D. Thomas

27 February 2000 Quarter-finals	Fulham	0–7	Arsenal	New Malden
13:30 GMT		Report	Spacey; Banks; White	Stadium: Motspur Park; Referee: Mr. R. Ward

25 March 2000 Semi-finals	Doncaster Belles	3–2	Arsenal	Mansfield
17:35 GMT	Jackson 3'; Walker 44'; Garside 61'	Report	Grant 8'; Spacey 37' (pen.)	Stadium: Field Mill; Referee: Wendy Toms (Dorset)

=== FA Women's Premier League Cup ===
26 September 1999 First round	Arsenal	6–0	Langford	Borehamwood
14:30 BST	Whealtey 8'; Grant; Lorton; Banks (pen.) (pen.)	Report		Stadium: Meadow Park; Attendance: 200; Referee: Mr Drew

31 October 1999 Second round	Aston Villa	1–7	Arsenal	Castle Vale
	Goal	Report	Spacey 8'; Banks (pen.); Lorton; Mapes; Wheatley	Stadium: Castle Vale Stadium

28 November 1999 Quarter-finals	Arsenal	6–1	Bangor City	Potters Bar
	Yankey; Banks; Spacey; Few; Wheatley	Report	Goal	Stadium: The Lantern Stadium

23 January 2000 Semi-finals	Everton	1–2 (a.e.t.)	Arsenal	Crosby
	Barr 84'	Report	Yankey 30', 100'	Stadium: Rossett Park

1 April 2000 Final	Arsenal	4–1	Croydon	Barnet
17:35 BST	Grant 13'; Pealling 47'; Wheatley 54'; Spacey 57' (pen.)	Report	Bampton (yellow card) 27'; Hunt (yellow card) 61'; Proctor 64'	Stadium: Underhill Stadium; Referee: Ms. A. E. Rayner (Staffordshire)

=== London County Cup ===
17 October 1999 Second Round	Arsenal	16–0	Leyton Orient
	Ta; Pealling; Downham; Coss; Wheatley; Stoney; Woolliscroft

Third Round	Freedom Glads	0–7	Arsenal
			Goal

30 January 2000 Semi Final	Arsenal	8–1	Barking	Potters Bar
	Grant; Banks; Harwood; Yankey	Report	Goal	Stadium: The Lantern Stadium

19 March 2000 Final	Arsenal	3–0 (a.e.t.)	Wimbledon	East Dulwich
	Spacey; White	Report		Stadium: Champion Hill; Referee: Mr. Patrick J. Jones

== See also ==
- List of Arsenal W.F.C. seasons
- 1999–2000 in English football
