= 1999–2000 FA Women's Premier League Cup =

Tournament details
- Country: England

Final positions
- Champions: Arsenal
- Runners-up: Croydon

The 1999–2000 FA Women's Premier League Cup was the 9th staging of the FA Women's Premier League Cup, a knockout competition for England's top 36 women's football clubs.

The tournament was won by Arsenal, who beat Croydon 4–1 in the final.

== Results ==
=== Qualifying round ===
Matches were played on 12 September 1999.

12 September 1999	Leeds United (NO)	2–0	Birmingham City (NO)
	Goal	Report

12 September 1999	Cardiff City (S)	0–4	Ilkeston Town (NO)
		Report	Goal

=== First round ===
Matches were played on 26 September and 3 and 10 October 1999.

26 September 1999	Tranmere Rovers (NA)	4–2	Ipswich Town (S)
	Goal	Report	Goal

26 September 1999	Barry Town (S)	0–0 (5–6 p)	Aston Villa (NA)
		Report
	Penalties
	Penalty scored Penalty missed		Penalty scored

26 September 1999	Coventry City (NO)	0–5	Leeds United (NO)
		Report	Goal

26 September 1999	Wolverhampton Wanderers (NO)	3–1	Sheffield Wednesday (NO)
	Goal	Report	Goal

26 September 1999	Ilkeston Town (NO)	0–1	Wembley Mill Hill (S)
		Report	Spencey 68'

26 September 1999	Berkhamsted Town (S)	0–6	Liverpool (NA)
		Report	Goal

26 September 1999	Reading Royals (NA)	1–0	Arnold Town (NO)
	Goal	Report

26 September 1999	Brighton & Hove Albion (S)	4–2	Millwall Lionesses (NA)
	Goal	Report	Goal

26 September 1999	Bradford City (NO)	0–5	Doncaster Belles (NA)
		Report	Walker; Exley; Garside; Coulthard

26 September 1999	Bangor City (NO)	3–2	Blyth Spartans Kestrels (NO)
	Goal	Report	Goal

26 September 1999	Croydon (NA)	4–0	Wimbledon (S)
	Walker; Hunn 46'; Bampton	Report

26 September 1999	Arsenal (NA)	6–0	Langford (S)
	Whealtey 8'; Grant; Lorton; Banks (pen.) (pen.)	Report

26 September 1999	Barking (S)	3–5	Southampton Saints (NA)
	Goal	Report	Goal

26 September 1999	Whitehawk (S)	1–2	Huddersfield Town (NO)
	Goal	Report	Goal

3 October 1999	Barnet (S)	5–3	Garswood Saints (NO)
	Goal	Report	Goal

10 October 1999	Three Bridges (S)	0–4	Everton (NA)
		Report	Britton 10'; Shimmin 50'; Marley; Easton 90'

=== Second round ===
Matches were played on 31 October and 7 November 1999.

31 October 1999	Bangor City (NO)	4–3	Leeds United (NO)
	Goal	Report	Goal

31 October 1999	Reading Royals (NA)	0–4	Doncaster Belles (NA)
		Report	Garside; Embleton; Walker

31 October 1999	Aston Villa (NA)	1–7	Arsenal (NA)
	Goal	Report	Spacey 8'; Banks (pen.); Lorton; Mapes; Wheatley

31 October 1999	Tranmere Rovers (NA)	2–1	Barnet (S)
	Goal	Report	Goal

31 October 1999	Wembley Mill Hill (S)	5–1	Huddersfield Town (NO)
	Jenkins 65'; Hills 73'; Wickham 76'; Eftychiou 90'	Report	Hancox 27'

7 November 1999	Southampton Saints (NA)	5–0	Wolverhampton Wanderers (NO)
	Goal	Report

7 November 1999	Everton (NA)	3–0	Brighton & Hove Albion (S)
	Burke; Barr; Marley 78'	Report

7 November 1999	Croydon (NA)	4–1	Liverpool (NA)
	Hunt; Walker; Fletcher	Report	Rask

=== Quarter-finals ===
Matches were played on 28 November 1999.

28 November 1999	Southampton Saints (NA)	1–8	Tranmere Rovers (NA)
	Goal	Report	Anderton; Smith

28 November 1999	Everton (NA)	2–1	Doncaster Belles (NA)
	Burke 14'; Gore	Report	Walker 8'

28 November 1999	Croydon (NA)	4–0	Wembley Mill Hill (S)
	Broadhurst; Walker 48'; Wylie 85'	Report

28 November 1999	Arsenal (NA)	6–1	Bangor City (NO)
	Yankey; Banks; Spacey; Few; Wheatley	Report	Goal

=== Semi-finals ===
Matches were played on 23 January 2000.

23 January 2000	Croydon (NA)	5–0	Tranmere Rovers (NA)
	Goal	Report

23 January 2000	Everton (NA)	1–2 (a.e.t.)	Arsenal (NA)
	Barr 84'	Report	Yankey 30', 100'

=== Final ===
1 April 2001

Arsenal	4–1	Croydon
Grant 13'; Pealling 47'; Wheatley 54'; Spacey 57' (pen.)	Report	Proctor 64'

Underhill Stadium, Barnet
Attendance: 1,024
Referee: A. Rayner (Staffs)
