= 1999–2000 in English football =

Football in England
- Season: 1999–2000

Men's football
- FA Premier League: Manchester United
- First Division: Charlton Athletic
- Second Division: Preston North End
- Third Division: Swansea City
- Football Conference: Kidderminster Harriers
- FA Cup: Chelsea
- Football League Trophy: Stoke City
- League Cup: Leicester City
- Charity Shield: Arsenal

Women's football
- Premier League National Division: Croydon
- Premier League Northern Division: Blyth Spartan Kestrals
- Premier League Southern Division: Barry Town
- FA Women's Cup: Croydon
- Premier League Cup: Arsenal

The 1999–2000 season was the 120th season of competitive football in England.

== Overview ==
=== Premier League ===
Manchester United were crowned FA Premier League champions with an 18-point margin over runners-up Arsenal and with just 3 league defeats all season. This was despite their failure to retain the European Cup and withdrawal from the FA Cup in order to compete in the FIFA Club World Championship – a campaign which was short lived. Andy Townsend also once said in The Sun that Manchester United should be "banned for life" from the FA Cup. Their season after the domination of 1998–99 was seen as a relative failure by the tabloids. Man United's failure in the FIFA Club World Championship, was surprisingly compounded by the press even more when David Beckham's wife Victoria, admitted on The Big Breakfast that he enjoys wearing her thongs. It was during this tournament he was sent off against Mexican team Club Necaxa, which was seen as the starting point in his team's first-round exit.

Sunderland made an impressive Premiership comeback by finishing seventh and just missing out on a UEFA Cup place, in part due to 30 goals from prolific striker Kevin Phillips.

Watford went down in bottom place with a record Premiership low of 24 points. Sheffield Wednesday were next to go down. On the last day of the season, Wimbledon lost 2–0 at Southampton and Bradford City achieved a shock 1–0 home win over Liverpool thanks to a goal by David Wetherall. This meant that Bradford had survived the drop and Liverpool had surrendered a UEFA Champions League place to Leeds United. It also meant that Wimbledon's 14-year spell in the top flight was over and they were relegated to Division One 12 years to the day that they had beaten Liverpool to achieve a shock FA Cup triumph.

=== Division One ===
The three promotion places in Division One went to league champions Charlton Athletic, runners-up Manchester City and playoff champions Ipswich Town.

1999–2000 also saw some of Division One's biggest clubs miss out on promotion—the biggest of these were Blackburn Rovers (11th) and Nottingham Forest (14th). Steve Coppell ended his fourth spell as Crystal Palace manager after doing wonders to keep a virtually bankrupt club clear of the Division One relegation zone.

Going down were Walsall, Port Vale and Swindon Town. West Bromwich Albion just missed out on the drop zone thanks to a late turn-around in form during the final weeks of the season which followed the appointment of Gary Megson as manager.

=== Division Two ===
David Moyes, 37, showed promise as one of the league's most highly rated young managers after he guided Preston North End to the Division Two championship. Stan Ternent's two-year rebuilding project at Burnley paid off as they finished runners-up in the division. Joining them in Division One were Peter Taylor's Gillingham, who had reached the upper half of the league for the first time in their history.

Going down were Cardiff City, Blackpool, Scunthorpe United and Chesterfield. Narrowly avoiding the drop were Oxford United, who struggled all season long despite the club's financial crisis being eased by the arrival of new Tanzanian chairman Firoz Kassam.

=== Division Three ===
Swansea City, Rotherham United, Northampton Town and Peterborough United occupied the four promotion places in Division Three.

Chester City were relegated on the last day of the season, ending their 69-year league career, while Shrewsbury Town and Carlisle United saved themselves from Conference football.

=== FA Cup ===
Chelsea beat Aston Villa 1–0 in the last FA Cup final at Wembley before its redevelopment. The competition was played despite the absence of holders Manchester United due to FIFA Club World Championship commitments. Their absence meant that in the 3rd round of the competition, there was an uneven number of teams, and so Darlington were picked out of a hat of "lucky losers" and played against Aston Villa despite having lost in the 2nd round of the competition. Villa beat them 2–1.

In a one-off season, most FA Cup rounds were played a few weeks earlier than their traditional dates. For example, the first round was played in late October (rather than mid-November) and the third round was held on the second Saturday in December (instead of its annual place at the start of the new year). The experiment has not been repeated since.

=== League Cup ===
Leicester City beat Tranmere Rovers 2–1 to yield their second League Cup in four seasons.

== Events ==
=== United retain their title ===
Manchester United retained their Premiership title after losing just three league games all season and finishing 18 points ahead of runners-up Arsenal. Roy Keane was voted Player of the Year by both the PFA and FWA and Dwight Yorke finished as the club's top scorer with 20 Premiership goals. United lost their defence of the European Cup after losing to eventual winners Real Madrid in the quarter-finals. Along the way they suffered an embarrassing 5–0 domestic loss to Chelsea, the biggest ever defeat for a British team defending the European Cup.

=== Chelsea triumph in Wembley finale ===
Chelsea beat Aston Villa 1–0 in the last FA Cup final at Wembley before the stadium was closed for reconstruction. Robert di Matteo, who had scored in the 1997 final, scored the only goal of the 2000 final to give Chelsea their third FA Cup triumph and end Villa's hopes of winning the trophy for the first time since 1957.

=== O'Neill lured to Celtic ===
Martin O'Neill guided Leicester City to their second League Cup triumph in four seasons before moving north of the border to Celtic, whose 'dream team' partnership of Director of Football Kenny Dalglish and Head Coach John Barnes had ended a nightmare as they finished 21 points behind champions Rangers in the SPL title race and had suffered a shock SFA Cup exit at the hands of Inverness Caledonian Thistle, which had inspired The Sun newspaper headline: "Super Caley Go Ballistic, Celtic Are Atrocious".

=== England blow it at Euro 2000 ===
England overcame Scotland in the qualification playoffs to qualify for Euro 2000, and beat Germany in the group stages. But they surrendered a two-goal lead to lose 3–2 to Portugal and lost by the same scoreline to Romania, and thus failed to reach the quarter-finals. This dismal showing saw continued calls for the F.A. to terminate Kevin Keegan's contract.

=== Veteran Robson takes over on Tyneside ===
Bobby Robson, 66, became the oldest manager ever to take charge of a Premiership club when he succeeded 37-year-old Ruud Gullit as manager of Newcastle United.

=== Chester out, Kidderminster in ===
Chester City were relegated to the Conference after 69 years of Football League membership. They were replaced by Conference champions Kidderminster Harriers, who had won the Conference title six years earlier but had been refused promotion because their Aggborough ground did not meet capacity requirements.

=== Coppell quits Palace again ===
Steve Coppell was sacked as Crystal Palace manager, having been in charge of the club four times in 16 years. New owner Simon Jordan brought in Alan Smith (who had managed Palace between 1993 and 1995) as Coppell's successor. The change of hands gave Palace fans hope for the future after a financial crisis had almost put the club out of business.

=== Shearer quits the international stage ===
Alan Shearer retired from international football after playing for England at Euro 2000, much to the dismay of many fans who felt that he still had a few years left in him at the highest level.

=== Wimbledon relegated after 14 years ===
Wimbledon were relegated from the Premiership after 14 years in the top flight. Their fate was sealed on 14 May, 12 years to the day since they had achieved their famous FA Cup victory over Liverpool.

== Awards ==
Roy Keane captained Manchester United to another Premiership title triumph and was credited with the PFA Players' Player of the Year and FWA Footballer of the Year awards.

Leeds United's 22-year-old Australian midfielder Harry Kewell was voted PFA Young Player of the Year after helping to secure a Champions League place for his side.

Kevin Phillips scored 30 Premiership goals for Sunderland to win the Premier League Golden Boot and making him the season's highest scorer among all four English professional divisions.

== Successful managers ==
Sir Alex Ferguson guided Manchester United to their sixth Premiership title in eight years.

Gianluca Vialli won his fourth major trophy in two-and-a-half seasons by winning the FA Cup for Chelsea.

David O'Leary ended his first full season as Leeds United manager with a run to the semi-finals of the UEFA Cup and qualification for next season's Champions League.

Peter Reid achieved a remarkable seventh-place finish for Sunderland in their Premiership comeback season.

Martin O'Neill ended his spell at Leicester City by achieving the Foxes' highest ever Premier League finish and by winning a second League Cup in four seasons.

Joe Royle took Manchester City into the Premiership after winning a second successive promotion.

Alan Curbishley guided Charlton Athletic to promotion back to the Premiership at the first attempt after they finished champions of Division One.

George Burley finally got Ipswich Town into the Premiership when they triumphed in the Division One playoffs after three successive seasons of failure.

David Moyes continued Preston North End's revival by guiding them to title success in Division Two.

Stan Ternent guided Burnley to runners-up spot in Division Two and secured their promotion to Division One.

John Hollins brought success to Swansea City, who won the Division Three title.

== League tables ==
=== FA Premier League ===
Manchester United retained the Premier League title, winning it for the sixth time in eight seasons, and finished the season as champions by a record 18-point margin; while their season was marred by faltering results in the early stages, a struggle to replace long-serving goalkeeper Peter Schmeichel, and their controversially withdrawing from the FA Cup in favour of an ultimately fruitless entry into the 2000 FIFA Club World Championship, they made up for this in style by winning all but three games (only one of which ended in defeat) after Christmas.

Arsenal finished runners-up for the second successive season, having spent much of the season well off the pace of the Champions League spots before a strong run in the late stages saw them clinch second place. Leeds United's season was essentially the opposite of those of the two teams above them, leading the table for much of the first half of the season, only for their form to completely implode in the final months, with only Liverpool's failure to win on the final day securing them a Champions League spot; their third-place finish was nonetheless their highest since title glory in 1992.

Liverpool's fourth-place finish meant that they had to settle for a UEFA Cup place, a shock defeat to Bradford City (who defied all the odds to avoid relegation in their first top-flight season for nearly 80 years) preventing them from qualifying for the Champions League on the final day. Joining Liverpool in the UEFA Cup were fifth placed FA Cup Winners Chelsea, and League Cup winners Leicester City. Newly promoted Sunderland just missed out on Europe, with a winless run from Boxing Day to mid-March ending their hopes, but their seventh-place finish was their highest for decades, and star striker Kevin Phillips bagged both the Golden Boot and the European Golden shoe, scoring 30 goals.

Ruud Gullit stepped down as Newcastle manager after one point from the first five games of the league campaign, paving the way for 66-year-old former England manager Bobby Robson to take up his first post in England since leaving the England job in 1990, and his first at club level since 1982. Robson steered Newcastle to an 11th-place finish and they also reached the FA Cup semi-finals.

Bradford's escape from relegation meant that Wimbledon, who were beaten by Southampton on the final day of the season, were relegated from the Premiership after 14 successive seasons of top-flight football. Sheffield Wednesday went down after three seasons of steady decline, having been in the top flight for all but one season since 1984, as a horrific first half of the season, which saw them bottom with a paltry 6 points at Christmas, ultimately proved too much to recover from. Watford's first top-flight season for more than a decade ended in relegation, being undone by a poor run of form from late September onwards which saw them slip into the bottom three, where they couldn't recover, ultimately resulting in them posting the lowest-ever points total for a Premier League team until that point.

Pos	Team	Pld	W	D	L	GF	GA	GD	Pts	Qualification or relegation
1	Manchester United (C)	38	28	7	3	97	45	+52	91	Qualification for the Champions League first group stage
2	Arsenal	38	22	7	9	73	43	+30	73	Qualification for the Champions League first group stage
3	Leeds United	38	21	6	11	58	43	+15	69	Qualification for the Champions League third qualifying round
4	Liverpool	38	19	10	9	51	30	+21	67	Qualification for the UEFA Cup first round (Note: Chelsea qualified for the UEFA Cup as FA Cup winners.)
5	Chelsea	38	18	11	9	53	34	+19	65	Qualification for the UEFA Cup first round
6	Aston Villa	38	15	13	10	46	35	+11	58	Qualification for the Intertoto Cup third round
7	Sunderland	38	16	10	12	57	56	+1	58	
8	Leicester City	38	16	7	15	55	55	0	55	Qualification for the UEFA Cup first round (Note: Leicester City qualified for the UEFA Cup as League Cup winners.)
9	West Ham United	38	15	10	13	52	53	−1	55	
10	Tottenham Hotspur	38	15	8	15	57	49	+8	53	
11	Newcastle United	38	14	10	14	63	54	+9	52	
12	Middlesbrough	38	14	10	14	46	52	−6	52	
13	Everton	38	12	14	12	59	49	+10	50	
14	Coventry City	38	12	8	18	47	54	−7	44	
15	Southampton	38	12	8	18	45	62	−17	44	
16	Derby County	38	9	11	18	44	57	−13	38	
17	Bradford City	38	9	9	20	38	68	−30	36	Qualification for the Intertoto Cup second round
18	Wimbledon (R)	38	7	12	19	46	74	−28	33	Relegation to the Football League First Division
19	Sheffield Wednesday (R)	38	8	7	23	38	70	−32	31	Relegation to the Football League First Division
20	Watford (R)	38	6	6	26	35	77	−42	24	Relegation to the Football League First Division

Source: Premier League
Rules for classification: 1) points; 2) goal difference; 3) number of goals scored.
(C) Champions; (R) Relegated
Notes:

Leading goalscorer: Kevin Phillips (Sunderland) – 30

=== Football League Division One ===
Charlton Athletic won the division with greater ease than the final table suggested – they were in fact the first team in the country to win promotion, but a return of just 4 points from their last 7 matches allowed the pursuing teams to close the gap. Manchester City won their second successive promotion in the runners-up spot, well and truly putting the memories of their relegation to the Second Division behind them. Ipswich Town finished in the play-offs for the fourth season in a row, but this time they were successful as they triumphed over Barnsley at Wembley and won promotion back to the Premier League after a five-year absence.

Wolves narrowly missed out on the playoffs for the third season running, while Huddersfield Town's eighth-place finish was perhaps the closest they had come to returning to the top flight since losing their top-flight place in 1972. Fulham finished ninth as their recent revival continued, but a failure to win a second successive promotion saw Paul Bracewell sacked as manager and replaced with Jean Tigana, who had won a French league title and reached a European Cup semi-final with AS Monaco.

Swindon suffered from a financial crisis and a transfer embargo for most of the season, and the effect on the pitch was obvious as they were relegated in bottom place. Port Vale, who had only survived the previous season due to the League's short-lived usage of Goals Scored over Goal Difference, went down with them. Walsall took their survival battle to the final day of the season, but were unable to avoid an immediate relegation back to Division Two.

Pos	Team	Pld	W	D	L	GF	GA	GD	Pts	Qualification or relegation
1	Charlton Athletic (C, P)	46	27	10	9	79	45	+34	91	Promotion to the Premier League
2	Manchester City (P)	46	26	11	9	78	40	+38	89	Promotion to the Premier League
3	Ipswich Town (O, P)	46	25	12	9	71	42	+29	87	Qualification for the First Division play-offs
4	Barnsley	46	24	10	12	88	67	+21	82	Qualification for the First Division play-offs
5	Birmingham City	46	22	11	13	65	44	+21	77	Qualification for the First Division play-offs
6	Bolton Wanderers	46	21	13	12	69	50	+19	76	Qualification for the First Division play-offs
7	Wolverhampton Wanderers	46	21	11	14	64	48	+16	74	
8	Huddersfield Town	46	21	11	14	62	49	+13	74	
9	Fulham	46	17	16	13	49	41	+8	67	
10	Queens Park Rangers	46	16	18	12	62	53	+9	66	
11	Blackburn Rovers	46	15	17	14	55	51	+4	62	
12	Norwich City	46	14	15	17	45	50	−5	57	
13	Tranmere Rovers	46	15	12	19	57	68	−11	57	
14	Nottingham Forest	46	14	14	18	53	55	−2	56	
15	Crystal Palace	46	13	15	18	57	67	−10	54	
16	Sheffield United	46	13	15	18	59	71	−12	54	
17	Stockport County	46	13	15	18	55	67	−12	54	
18	Portsmouth	46	13	12	21	55	66	−11	51	
19	Crewe Alexandra	46	14	9	23	46	67	−21	51	
20	Grimsby Town	46	13	12	21	41	67	−26	51	
21	West Bromwich Albion	46	10	19	17	43	60	−17	49	
22	Walsall (R)	46	11	13	22	52	77	−25	46	Relegation to the Second Division
23	Port Vale (R)	46	7	15	24	48	69	−21	36	Relegation to the Second Division
24	Swindon Town (R)	46	8	12	26	38	77	−39	36	Relegation to the Second Division

Rules for classification: 1) Points; 2) Goal difference; 3) Goals scored
(C) Champions; (O) Play-off winners; (P) Promoted; (R) Relegated

Leading goalscorer: Andy Hunt (Charlton Athletic) – 24

=== Football League Division Two ===
Preston won the division title after 19 years away from the top two divisions, showing great progress under promising young manager David Moyes. Burnley, who were unfancied and even tipped for relegation by some owing to two unimpressive previous seasons, achieved promotion in the second automatic spot. After losing in the previous year's play-off final, Gillingham won promotion via the Division Two playoffs to reach the upper half of the English league for the first time in their history, their opponents in the play-off final being a Wigan Athletic side playing their first season in the impressive new 25,000-seat JJB Stadium.

Chesterfield started the season well enough, but a dreadful run of 2 wins in 20 games mid-season consigned them to relegation and spelled the end as manager for John Duncan after seven years. Scunthorpe, who had won promotion via the play-offs the previous year, never achieved enough wins to have a serious chance of survival, and went straight back down. Blackpool had been coping well in previous seasons despite financial problems, but they finally took their toll this season and helped send the club down. Cardiff were the final relegated team, eventually proving the weakest of a group of sides that could have easily gone down in the last weeks of the season. The highlight of their season was their game against Cambridge United, where they drew despite being a player down after 45 minutes, two players down after 63 minutes and 3 players down after 75 minutes. Oxford United finished one point clear of a second successive relegation, their future secured after being taken over by hotelier Firoz Kassam, who enabled construction work to resume on the club's long-awaited new stadium.

Pos	Team	Pld	W	D	L	GF	GA	GD	Pts	Promotion or relegation
1	Preston North End (C, P)	46	28	11	7	74	37	+37	95	Promotion to the First Division
2	Burnley (P)	46	25	13	8	69	47	+22	88	Promotion to the First Division
3	Gillingham (O, P)	46	25	10	11	79	48	+31	85	Qualification for the Second Division play-offs
4	Wigan Athletic	46	22	17	7	72	38	+34	83	Qualification for the Second Division play-offs
5	Millwall	46	23	13	10	76	50	+26	82	Qualification for the Second Division play-offs
6	Stoke City	46	23	13	10	68	42	+26	82	Qualification for the Second Division play-offs
7	Bristol Rovers	46	23	11	12	69	45	+24	80	
8	Notts County	46	18	11	17	61	55	+6	65	
9	Bristol City	46	15	19	12	59	57	+2	64	
10	Reading	46	16	14	16	57	63	−6	62	
11	Wrexham	46	17	11	18	52	61	−9	62	
12	Wycombe Wanderers	46	16	13	17	56	53	+3	61	
13	Luton Town	46	17	10	19	61	65	−4	61	
14	Oldham Athletic	46	16	12	18	50	55	−5	60	
15	Bury	46	13	18	15	61	64	−3	57	
16	Bournemouth	46	16	9	21	59	62	−3	57	
17	Brentford	46	13	13	20	47	61	−14	52	
18	Colchester United	46	14	10	22	59	82	−23	52	
19	Cambridge United	46	12	12	22	64	65	−1	48	
20	Oxford United	46	12	9	25	43	73	−30	45	
21	Cardiff City (R)	46	9	17	20	45	67	−22	44	Relegation to the Third Division
22	Blackpool (R)	46	8	17	21	49	77	−28	41	Relegation to the Third Division
23	Scunthorpe United (R)	46	9	12	25	40	74	−34	39	Relegation to the Third Division
24	Chesterfield (R)	46	7	15	24	34	63	−29	36	Relegation to the Third Division

Rules for classification: 1) Points; 2) Goal difference; 3) Goals scored
(C) Champions; (O) Play-off winners; (P) Promoted; (R) Relegated

Leading goalscorer: Andy Payton (Burnley) – 27

=== Football League Division Three ===
Swansea and Rotherham, both of whom had been dumped out in the play-off semi-finals the previous year, led the table for virtually the entire season. Swansea eventually won the title by drawing a stormy last game of the season between the two sides. The third automatic spot was won by Northampton, who were led to promotion by new manager Kevin Wilson after a poor start to the season under previous manager Ian Atkins. Peterborough won the play-offs, returning to Division Two after an absence of three years.

A four-way relegation scrap took place throughout most of the season, involving Chester, Shrewsbury, Carlisle and York. York eventually pulled away to safety with some good results in the final weeks of the season, leaving the other three to face a final-day relegation battle. In the end, Chester, who had spent virtually the entire season rooted to the bottom of the table and only had the chance of a last-day escape because of similarly poor campaigns by Carlisle and Shrewsbury, were relegated to the Conference.

Pos	Team	Pld	W	D	L	GF	GA	GD	Pts	Promotion or relegation
1	Swansea City (C, P)	46	24	13	9	51	30	+21	85	Promotion to the Second Division
2	Rotherham United (P)	46	24	12	10	72	36	+36	84	Promotion to the Second Division
3	Northampton Town (P)	46	25	7	14	63	45	+18	82	Promotion to the Second Division
4	Darlington	46	21	16	9	66	36	+30	79	Qualification for the Third Division play-offs
5	Peterborough United (O, P)	46	22	12	12	63	54	+9	78	Qualification for the Third Division play-offs
6	Barnet	46	21	12	13	59	53	+6	75	Qualification for the Third Division play-offs
7	Hartlepool United	46	21	9	16	60	49	+11	72	Qualification for the Third Division play-offs
8	Cheltenham Town	46	20	10	16	50	42	+8	70	
9	Torquay United	46	19	12	15	62	52	+10	69	
10	Rochdale	46	18	14	14	57	54	+3	68	
11	Brighton & Hove Albion	46	17	16	13	64	46	+18	67	
12	Plymouth Argyle	46	16	18	12	55	51	+4	66	
13	Macclesfield Town	46	18	11	17	66	61	+5	65	
14	Hull City	46	15	14	17	43	43	0	59	
15	Lincoln City	46	15	14	17	67	69	−2	59	
16	Southend United	46	15	11	20	53	61	−8	56	
17	Mansfield Town	46	16	8	22	50	65	−15	56	
18	Halifax Town	46	15	9	22	44	58	−14	54	
19	Leyton Orient	46	13	13	20	47	52	−5	52	
20	York City	46	12	16	18	39	53	−14	52	
21	Exeter City	46	11	11	24	46	72	−26	44	
22	Shrewsbury Town	46	9	13	24	40	67	−27	40	
23	Carlisle United	46	9	12	25	42	75	−33	39	
24	Chester City (R)	46	10	9	27	44	79	−35	39	Relegation to Football Conference

Rules for classification: 1) Points; 2) Goal difference; 3) Goals scored
(C) Champions; (O) Play-off winners; (P) Promoted; (R) Relegated

Leading goalscorer: Marco Gabbiadini (Darlington) – 25

== Diary of the season ==
17 June 1999 – David James leaves Liverpool after seven years in a £1.7 million move to Aston Villa.

21 June 1999 – The France national team captain Didier Deschamps joins Chelsea in a £3 million move from Juventus.

30 June 1999 – Bradford City prepare for their first time top division season for nearly 80 years with a club record £1.4 million move for Leeds United defender David Wetherall.

5 July 1999 – Chelsea pay a club record £10 million for Blackburn Rovers striker Chris Sutton.

14 July 1999 – Newcastle United pay Ipswich Town £6.5 million for midfielder Kieron Dyer and Everton pay Trabzonspor £3 million for on-loan striker Kevin Campbell, who scored eight goals in seven games for them late last season.

23 July 1999 – Leeds United sign striker Michael Bridges from Sunderland for £5 million.

29 July 1999 – Four years after leaving Arsenal, Stefan Schwarz returns to English football in a £4 million move to Sunderland from Valencia.

31 July 1999 – Middlesbrough sign German international midfielder Christian Ziege from AC Milan for £4 million.

1 August 1999 – Arsenal lift the Charity Shield thanks to a 2–1 victory over Manchester United at Wembley.

2 August 1999 – Arsenal sell Nicolas Anelka to Real Madrid for £23 million – the highest fee involving a British club.

3 August 1999 – Arsenal sign Thierry Henry for an estimated fee of £11 million, reuniting with his former manager Arsène Wenger.

4 August 1999 – Leeds United sell Jimmy Floyd Hasselbaink to Atlético Madrid of Spain for £12 million.

7 August 1999 – Wigan Athletic mark their first game at the JJB Stadium with a 3–0 win over Scunthorpe United in Division Two. The first Premier League games of the season include Chelsea's 4–0 home win over newly-promoted Sunderland and Watford's 3–2 home defeat against Wimbledon in their return to the top flight. Bradford City mark their first top-flight game since 1922 with a 1–0 away win over Middlesbrough, in which Dean Saunders scores a late winner.

10 August 1999 – Kevin Phillips scores his first two Premier League goals in Sunderland's 2–0 home win over his old club Watford.

11 August 1999 – Manchester United beat Sheffield Wednesday 4–0 at Old Trafford. Michael Bridges scores a hat-trick for Leeds United in their 3–0 away win over Southampton. Leeds United sign Coventry City striker Darren Huckerby for £4.4 million.

14 August 1999 – Tommy Mooney scores for Watford in their shock 1–0 league win at Liverpool.

18 August 1999 – 19-year-old Wolverhampton Wanderers striker Robbie Keane becomes Coventry City's record signing in a £6 million deal.

21 August 1999 – Manchester United captain Roy Keane scores twice in a 2–1 win over Arsenal at Highbury.

25 August 1999 – Kevin Phillips and Niall Quinn plunge Newcastle United into crisis as they score in Sunderland's 2–1 derby win at St. James' Park,

27 August 1999 – Lazio beat Manchester United 1–0 in Monaco to win the European Super Cup.

28 August 1999 – Ruud Gullit resigns after one year as manager of Newcastle United.

30 August 1999 – Andy Cole scores four goals against his old club Newcastle United as Manchester United beat them 5–1 at Old Trafford.

31 August 1999 – The first month of the league season ends with treble winners Manchester United looking well placed for retaining their league title as Premier League leaders with five wins and a draw from their first six games. Aston Villa are their nearest contenders, while Chelsea, West Ham United and Leicester City complete the top five. Sheffield Wednesday and Newcastle United, both winless, prop up the rest of the top flight, while Bradford City occupy the final bottom three position at the end of the first month of their first top division season for nearly 80 years. Ipswich Town are hopeful of making it back to the Premier League after five seasons away (during which time they have suffered three play-off disappointments) as they finish the first month of the season as Division One leaders. Stockport County have emerged as surprise contenders for a Premier League place as they stand second in Division One. The playoff zone is occupied by West Bromwich Albion, Manchester City, Birmingham City and Fulham.

3 September 1999 – Newcastle United appoint Bobby Robson as their new manager. The former England manager, 66, is the oldest manager in all four division of the English league – and almost 30 years older than his predecessor Ruud Gullit.

7 September 1999 – Ade Akinbiyi becomes the most expensive Division Two player when he leaves Bristol City for Division One promotion hopefuls Wolverhampton Wanderers.

11 September 1999 – Jamie Carragher scores two own goals as Liverpool lose 3–2 at home to Manchester United in the league.

17 September 1999 – Former England and Liverpool full-back Rob Jones retires from football at the age of 28 after failing to recover from a succession of injuries.

18 September 1999 – Newcastle United record the second highest win in FA Premier League history when they beat Sheffield Wednesday 8–0. Alan Shearer scores five goals in this game, while Kevin Phillips scores a hat-trick in Sunderland's 5–0 win at Derby County. In a rare appearance for Manchester United, Jordi Cruyff scores a late equaliser in their 1–1 home draw with Wimbledon.

30 September 1999 – Manchester United retain their lead of the Premier League, with Leeds United now their nearest contenders by a two-point margin. Arsenal, Sunderland and Chelsea complete the top five. Sheffield Wednesday remain bottom after a terrible first two months of the season, while Newcastle United remain second from bottom despite that record-breaking victory 12 days ago, and Wimbledon now occupy the final remaining relegation position. Ipswich Town and Birmingham City are level on points at the top of Division One. Charlton Athletic, Manchester City, Fulham and Barnsley complete the top six.

2 October 1999 – Sheffield Wednesday record a 5–1 home win over Wimbledon.

3 October 1999 – Chelsea crush Manchester United 5–0 – the first domestic competitive game that United have lost for nearly nine months. Alan Shearer scores twice as Newcastle beat Middlesbrough 2–1.

24 October 1999 – A Premier League thriller at Goodison Park sees Everton and Leeds United draw 4–4, a result that ends the Yorkshire club's 10-match winning streak. Elsewhere, a late Trevor Sinclair equalizer for West Ham United stops ten-man Sunderland's ascension to the top; the Black Cats instead rise to third.

31 October 1999 – October draws to a close with Leeds United as the new Premier League leaders, with Manchester United in second place and trailing them by two points. Arsenal, Sunderland and Leicester City complete the top five. Sheffield Wednesday remain bottom, with Watford and Bradford City completing the bottom three. Manchester City lead Division One, with Ipswich Town, Charlton Athletic and Birmingham City level on points as their nearest rivals. Huddersfield Town and Fulham complete the top six.

13 November 1999 – Paul Scholes scores twice as England beat Scotland 2–0 at Hampden Park in the Euro 2000 qualifying playoff first leg.

17 November 1999 — England qualify for Euro 2000 despite a 1–0 second leg defeat by Scotland at Wembley. Arsenal announce plans to move to a new 60,000-seat stadium at Ashburton Grove near Highbury, their home since 1913.

20 November 1999 – Marc Overmars scores a hat-trick in Arsenal's 5–1 home league win over Middlesbrough.

30 November 1999 – Manchester United are back on top of the Premier League as November draws to a close, with former leaders Leeds United now bracketed on points with Arsenal as their nearest rivals. Newly promoted Sunderland's excellent start to the season sees them still in fourth place, with a resurgent Liverpool standing fifth. Sheffield Wednesday and Watford continue to prop up the rest of the Premier League, accompanied in the drop zone by a Derby County side who had spent the previous two seasons chasing a place in Europe. Manchester City remain top of Division One, with Huddersfield Town now second and in the hunt for top division for the first time in nearly 30 years. Charlton Athletic, Ipswich Town, Barnsley and Fulham occupy the playoff places.

1 December 1999 – Film producer and actor Bill Kenwright, 54, completes a takeover of Everton after buying out former owner Peter Johnson.

4 December 1999 – Ole Gunnar Solskjaer scores four goals in Manchester United's 5–1 home league win over Everton.

31 December 1999 – 1999 draws to a close and as the new millennium approaches, Leeds United are back on top though with just a one-point lead over Manchester United who have a game in hand. Arsenal, Sunderland and Liverpool are the only three teams still posing a reasonable threat to the top two. Sheffield Wednesday's terrible season has continued as they remain bottom with a mere two wins and nine points from their first 20 games, while Watford and Derby County remain in the bottom three. The race for promotion to the Premier League is still headed by Manchester City and Huddersfield Town, while Charlton Athletic, Ipswich Town, Barnsley and Stockport County complete the top six.

8 January 2000 – Liverpool suffer a shock 1–0 home defeat to Blackburn Rovers in the FA Cup fourth round. Tranmere Rovers, on a good run in the League Cup, progress to the fifth round of the FA Cup after a surprise 1–0 win at home to Sunderland in the fourth round. There is a major shock also for Bradford City, who are crushed 3–1 by Division Two Gillingham at Priestfield.

12 January 2000 – Liberian striker George Weah, 31, joins Chelsea on a six-month loan from A.C. Milan.

19 January 2000 – Arsenal's hopes of FA Cup glory are ended in a replay penalty shoot-out defeat by Leicester City, who boost their own bid for a cup double.

29 January 2000 – The FA Cup fifth round brings some surprise results as Gillingham's giant-killing run continues with a 3–1 home win over Sheffield Wednesday and Charlton Athletic win at Coventry City to give the rest of the Premier League some idea of what they will be performing like when inevitable promotion is achieved. Leicester City's hopes of a domestic cup double are ended when they lose 2–1 at Chelsea, while Cambridge United's impressive run ends in a 3–1 home defeat by Bolton Wanderers. On the transfer front, Division One strugglers West Bromwich Albion sell their Italian midfielder Enzo Maresca to Juventus for £4 million.

30 January 2000 – Blackpool striker Martin Aldridge, 25, on loan to Rushden & Diamonds, dies in an Oxford hospital after being injured in a car crash in Northamptonshire.

31 January 2000 – Struggling Sheffield Wednesday complete the month unbeaten in the FA Premier League. Danny Wilson is named FA Premier League Manager of the Month, but the club are still in the relegation zone, though no longer in the bottom place (now occupied by Watford. Bradford City occupy the other relegation position. Manchester United now lead at the top on goal difference ahead of Leeds United, with Arsenal and Liverpool still posing a threat but Sunderland's challenge is ebbing away. Charlton Athletic have taken over from Manchester City as Division One leaders. Ipswich Town, Barnsley, Huddersfield Town and Wolverhampton Wanderers complete the top six.

12 February 2000 – Manchester United suffer their first Premier League defeat in four months, and only their third of the season, as they lose 3–0 at Newcastle United. A Premier League thriller at Upton Park sees West Ham United beat Bradford City 5–4.

19 February 2000 – Bolton Wanderers reach the FA Cup semi-finals with a 1–0 win over Charlton Athletic as they hope to challenge for a "Wembley double" of the FA Cup final and Division One play-off final.

20 February 2000 – Gillingham's FA Cup dreams are ended with a 5–0 defeat at Chelsea, while a 2–1 defeat at home to Aston Villa resigns Everton to another season of disappointment in Walter Smith's second season as manager. Tranmere Rovers are eliminated by Newcastle United after a brave 3–2 defeat.

23 February 2000 – Stanley Matthews, one of the greatest English footballers of all time, dies at the age of 85.

26 February 2000 – Wimbledon become the first team this season to be unbeaten twice in the league by Manchester United after holding them to a 2–2 draw at Selhurst Park.

29 February 2000 – Manchester United have now extended their Premier League lead to six points as February ends, with Leeds United posing the closest threat, while Arsenal and Liverpool (along with a resurgent Chelsea) pose a more distant threat, and Sunderland are now focused on qualifying for the UEFA Cup rather than challenging for the league title. Sheffield Wednesday and Watford continue to prop up the Premier League, with Bradford City joining them in the drop zone. Charlton Athletic and Manchester City continue to head the Division One promotion race, with Ipswich Town, Barnsley, Huddersfield Town and Birmingham City completing the top six.

4 March 2000 – Debutant striker Stan Collymore scores a hat-trick for Leicester City in their 5–2 win over Sunderland in the Premier League, just days after his transfer from Aston Villa.

7 March 2000 – John Hartson's proposed move from Wimbledon to Tottenham Hotspur collapses after he fails a medical.

10 March 2000 – Liverpool pay a club record £11 million for Leicester City striker Emile Heskey.

11 March 2000 – Steffen Iversen scores a hat-trick in Tottenham's 7–2 home league win over Southampton.

22 March 2000 – Dean Windass scores a hat-trick in Bradford City's 4–4 relegation crunch thriller with Derby County at Valley Parade.

31 March 2000 – Manchester United are now looking all set for title glory as they head the table by a seven-point margin with Leeds United as their closest rivals. Liverpool, Chelsea and Arsenal are looking more and more distant a threat in the race to prevent the Premier League trophy from remaining at Old Trafford. At the other end of the table, Sheffield Wednesday and Watford are looking doomed, with Bradford City occupying the final relegation position and Derby County hovering dangerously close to the drop zone. The race for Premier League football next season is headed by Charlton Athletic and Ipswich Town. Barnsley, Manchester City, Huddersfield Town and Birmingham City complete the top six.

2 April 2000 – Aston Villa beat Bolton Wanderers on penalties after a goalless draw in the FA Cup semi-final at Wembley, to reach their first FA Cup final for 43 years.

5 April 2000 – Two Leeds United Fans, Chris Loftus and Kevin Speight are killed on the eve of the club's UEFA Cup Semi-final against Galatasaray.

9 April 2000 – Two goals from Gus Poyet give Chelsea a 2–1 win over Newcastle United in the FA Cup semi-final.

10 April 2000 – A late surge by Middlesbrough is unable to prevent Manchester United from winning a thrilling Premier League 4–3 at the Riverside Stadium.

15 April 2000 – All Premier League matches kicked off at 3.06 pm, to commemorate the 96 Liverpool supporters who lost their lives in the Hillsborough disaster.

19 April 2000 – Derby County bring Georgi Kinkladze back to England after two years with Ajax after agreeing a £3 million deal. Manchester United surrender their defence of the European Cup after losing 3–2 at home to Real Madrid in the quarter-final second leg.

21 April 2000 – Charlton Athletic win promotion back to the Premier League after one season away.

22 April 2000 – Manchester United seal their sixth Premier League title in eight seasons with a 3–1 win at Southampton.

29 April 2000 – Bradford City boost their survival bid and dent Wimbledon's with a 3–0 win at Valley Parade.

30 April 2000 – April draws to a close with champions Manchester United an incredible 19 points ahead of second placed Arsenal, who have two games in hand. Liverpool are looking set for the third Champions League place, while Chelsea head the UEFA Cup race. Leeds United meanwhile have fallen to fifth place after a disastrous run of results, and now look unlikely to even qualify for European competition at all. Aston Villa, Sunderland and West Ham United remain in with a slim chance of taking the league's UEFA Cup slot. Charlton Athletic have been confirmed as Division One champions, but the race for second place is still being contested by Manchester City and Ipswich Town.

7 May 2000 – Chester City are relegated to the Football Conference after 69 years of Football League membership. On the same day, Manchester City secure promotion to the Premier League as Division One runners-up (their second successive promotion), Walsall suffer relegation to Division Two, Burnley secure promotion to Division One as Division Two runners-up, and Northampton seal the third and final automatic promotion place in Division Three. Chester City's place in the Football League will be taken by Conference champions Kidderminster Harriers.

9 May 2000 – Sheffield Wednesday are relegated from the Premier League after nine successive seasons of top-flight football, but go down fighting with a 3–3 draw against Arsenal.

14 May 2000 – Wimbledon lose 2–0 at Southampton and are relegated to Division One after 14 years in the top flight, and 12 years to the day after their FA Cup triumph over Liverpool. Bradford City, meanwhile, confirm their survival with a 1–0 win over Liverpool, who surrender a Champions League place to Leeds United.

14 May 2000 – ITV announces a £500 million bid to bring live Premier League matches onto terrestrial television for the first time. If the deal goes ahead, it will be the first time since 1992 (when the Premier League was created from the old Football League First Division) that live top division football has been shown on any terrestrial television channel.

18 May 2000 – West Ham United sell Marc-Vivien Foé to Olympique Lyonnais for £6 million.

20 May 2000 – Chelsea beat Aston Villa 1–0 in the last FA Cup final to be played at Wembley before the 77-year-old stadium is rebuilt. Roberto Di Matteo, who scored for Chelsea in the opening minute of their 1997 triumph, scores the only goal of the game.

29 May 2000 – Ipswich Town seal promotion to the Premier League after a five-year exile by defeating Barnsley 4–2 in the Division One playoff final at Wembley. It is their first win at Wembley since they won the FA Cup in 1978.

30 May 2000 – Arsenal sign Cameroon defender Lauren for £7.2 million from Mallorca.

31 May 2000 – Manchester United pay a national record fee for a goalkeeper when they sign AS Monaco and France goalkeeper Fabien Barthez for £7.8 million.

1 June 2000 – Martin O'Neill leaves Leicester City to take over as manager of Celtic. Tottenham Hotspur pay a club record £11 million for Dynamo Kyiv striker Serhii Rebrov.

2 June 2000 – Chelsea equal the national transfer record (set by Alan Shearer four years ago) with a £15 million move for Jimmy Floyd Hasselbaink.

14 June 2000 – Match of the Day, the longest-running and most popular football programme on British television, is set to end after next season as a result of ITV's £183 million deal to show highlights from Premier League games.

20 June 2000 – Chelsea sign Icelandic striker Eiður Guðjohnsen from Bolton Wanderers for £5 million.

== Women's football ==
=== Women's Premier League ===
==== National Division ====
Pos	Team	Pld	W	D	L	GF	GA	GD	Pts	Qualification or relegation
1	Croydon (C)	18	15	2	1	58	13	+45	47	
2	Doncaster Belles	18	15	1	2	66	14	+52	46	
3	Arsenal	18	13	2	3	73	13	+60	41	
4	Everton	18	10	3	5	62	31	+31	33	
5	Tranmere Rovers	18	9	1	8	43	36	+7	28	
6	Southampton Saints	18	5	3	10	23	32	−9	18	
7	Millwall Lionesses	18	5	3	10	19	43	−24	18	
8	Liverpool	18	4	4	10	15	38	−23	16	
9	Reading Royals (R)	18	3	2	13	20	84	−64	11	Relegation to the Southern Division
10	Aston Villa (R)	18	0	1	17	6	81	−75	1	Relegation to the Northern Division

Source: FA WPL
(C) Champions; (R) Relegated

==== Northern Division ====
Pos	Team	Pld	W	D	L	GF	GA	GD	Pts	Promotion or relegation
1	Blyth Spartans Kestrels (C, P)	22	20	1	1	90	21	+69	61	Promotion to the National Division
2	Bangor City	22	14	6	2	44	19	+25	48	
3	Wolverhampton Wanderers	22	13	3	6	64	34	+30	42	
4	Leeds United	22	12	3	7	48	30	+18	39	
5	Sheffield Wednesday	22	10	5	7	44	42	+2	35	
6	Garswood Saints	22	9	7	6	45	39	+6	34	
7	Ilkeston Town	22	7	4	11	33	40	−7	25	
8	Birmingham City	22	6	5	11	32	47	−15	23	
9	Coventry City	22	5	4	13	24	48	−24	19	
10	Huddersfield Town	22	5	4	13	28	56	−28	19	
11	Bradford City (R)	22	5	2	15	40	69	−29	17	Relegation to the Northern Combination League
12	Arnold Town (R)	22	3	2	17	14	61	−47	11	Relegation to the Midland Combination League

Source: FA WPL
(C) Champions; (P) Promoted; (R) Relegated

==== Southern Division ====
Pos	Team	Pld	W	D	L	GF	GA	GD	Pts	Promotion or relegation
1	Barry Town (C, P)	22	16	1	5	73	25	+48	49	Promotion to the National Division
2	Brighton & Hove Albion	22	15	4	3	59	22	+37	49	
3	Wembley Mill Hill	22	14	2	6	56	20	+36	44	
4	Ipswich Town	22	14	0	8	54	41	+13	42	
5	Langford	22	11	4	7	46	29	+17	37	
6	Berkhamsted Town	22	9	5	8	41	46	−5	32	
7	Wimbledon	22	9	3	10	58	44	+14	30	
8	Barnet	22	7	7	8	40	50	−10	28	
9	Barking	22	8	3	11	67	57	+10	27	
10	Cardiff City	22	6	3	13	31	63	−32	21	
11	Three Bridges (R)	22	4	6	12	30	48	−18	18	Club dissolved the following season
12	Whitehawk (R)	22	0	0	22	15	125	−110	0	Relegation to the South East Combination League

Source: FA WPL
(C) Champions; (P) Promoted; (R) Relegated

=== FA Women's Cup ===
==== Final ====
1 May 2000
15:00 BST

Doncaster Belles	1–2	Croydon Women
Exley 37'		Walker 23'; Hunt 65'

Bramall Lane, Sheffield
Attendance: 3,434
Referee: Janie Frampton (Dorset)

== Famous debutants ==
- Ashley Cole, 18, was involved in Arsenal's League Cup tie at Middlesbrough in November 1999, with his first taste of league action following in a loan spell at Crystal Palace.
- A future rival of Cole's for the England left-back slot, Nicky Shorey, 18, is brought on as substitute for Leyton Orient at Shrewsbury Town in February 2000.
- Shaun Wright-Phillips helps Manchester City win at Burnley in the League Cup in August 1999, two months before his 18th birthday.
- Michael Carrick makes his professional debut, for West Ham United, in the Intertoto Cup in the 1–1 draw with FC Jokerit in August 1999.

== Retirements ==
- David Hirst, 32, retired after a spell at Southampton which lasted for more than two years but was disrupted by a series of injuries.
- Peter Beardsley, 38, finished his professional career on 28 October 1999 after spending 10 months at Hartlepool United, but prolonged his playing career at non-league level with Doncaster Rovers in the Football Conference until finally retiring on 30 November.
- Jim Leighton, 41, who was in the English league with Manchester United as a goalkeeper from 1988 to 1992 (being first choice in his first two seasons there), finished his career in his native Scotland with Aberdeen.
- Ian Wright, 36, retired at the end of the season after a four-month spell with Burnley, in which his four goals from 15 games helped them win promotion from Division Two.
- Nigel Spink, 41, one of the oldest and longest serving players in the English leagues, finally retired at professional level after a three-year spell at Millwall, though he would continue at non-league level for a year as player-manager of Forest Green Rovers.

== Deaths ==
- 6 July 1999: Johnny Campbell, 89, who was born in Ayrshire, Scotland, moved south of the border in 1931 to begin his professional career with Leicester City. He played 21 league games in attack over the next two years, scoring 12 goals, before transferring to Lincoln City in 1933. He managed 104 goals in 184 league games before his professional career was ended by World War II. He then continued his playing career at non-league level.
- 18 August 1999: Alf Kirchen, 85, was a prolific right-winger who started his career in style with 11 goals in 14 league games at Norwich City in the mid-1930s before he signed for Arsenal. He was then capped three times by England, scoring twice, and managed 38 goals in 92 league games for Arsenal before the outbreak of war. His career was ended by an injury suffered in a wartime match in 1943.
- 17 September 1999: Fred Avey, 90, had a promising start to his professional career with Fulham in the late 1920s, scoring 28 goals in 62 league games as a forward, but lost his place in the team and was transferred to Torquay United, playing just three league games and dropping out of league football at the age of 24.
- 29 September 1999: Walter Joyce, 62, played 70 league games at wing-half for Burnley between 1954 and 1964, later turning out for Blackburn Rovers and finally his hometown club Oldham Athletic before retiring from playing in 1970. He was the father of fellow footballer Warren Joyce, who played 70 league games for Burnley between 1993 and 1996 and moved into management with Hull City in November 1998.
- 16 October 1999: Bill Dodgin senior, 90, played at wing-half for Huddersfield Town, Lincoln City, Charlton Athletic, Bristol Rovers and Orient in the 1930s. He then managed Southampton, Fulham, Brentford and then returned to Bristol Rovers in a managerial career which stretched from 1946 to 1972, with a 13-year interval between his departure from Brentford and appointment at Bristol Rovers. His son, Bill junior, played under him at Southampton and Fulham.
- 27 October 1999: Johnny Byrne, 60, was a striker who played for Crystal Palace, before commanding a British transfer record fee to go to West Ham United, playing in the side that won the FA Cup and the Cup Winners' Cup in the mid-1960s. He also played for the England team, scoring 8 goals in 11 appearances, including a hattrick against a Portugal side that featured Eusébio. He later went back to Palace, then to Fulham, before rounding out his career in South Africa, with Durban City. "Budgie" would spend the rest of his life there.
- 1 November 1999: Dave Bickles, 55, was a full-back in the same 1960s West Ham United side. He too later played for Crystal Palace and then Colchester United before retiring from football to become a P.E. teacher in 1979. He was also a part-time coach for West Ham United.
- 23 December 1999:
  - – Stan Flashman, 69, rescued near-bankrupt non-league Barnet with a takeover deal in 1985. He made funds available to manager Barry Fry in hope of building a quality side, and this paid off with promotion to the Football League in 1991, but he had quit within two years with the club knee deep in financial problems once again. Although Flashman's rash attitude (which saw him sack and reinstate Fry eight times) made him unpopular with most Barnet fans, it is unlikely that Barnet would have experienced league football without his takeover – they could well have gone out of business.
  - – Billy McGlen, 78, played 122 league games at wing-half for Manchester United in the six seasons after the end of World War II. He later played for Lincoln City and Oldham Athletic.
- 7 January 2000: Ken Keyworth, 65, scored 63 goals in 177 league games for Leicester City after joining them from his hometown club Rotherham United, collecting a League Cup winner's medal at Filbert Street in 1964, and scoring their consolation goal in the 1963 FA Cup final defeat to Manchester United. He was also on the losing side to Tottenham Hotspur in the 1961 final. He finished his playing career with brief spells at Coventry City and Swindon Town.
- 30 January 2000: Martin Aldridge, 25, Blackpool striker on loan to Rushden & Diamonds, died in an Oxford hospital from injuries sustained in a car crash in Northamptonshire. He had been a fairly consistent goalscorer for Northampton Town and Oxford United earlier in his career, and was a regular striker for Oxford during their 1996–97 Division Two promotion campaign.
- 23 February 2000: Sir Stanley Matthews, 85, one of the greatest footballers England ever produced, died in his native Stoke-on-Trent three weeks after his 85th birthday. Despite his on-the-field brilliance, he only ever won one major trophy – the 1953 FA Cup with Blackpool. That game was dubbed 'The Matthews Final' because he had so influenced his side's dramatic recovery from almost certain defeat at the hands of Bolton Wanderers.
- 14 April 2000: Wilf Mannion, 81, died just a few weeks after his old England teammate Sir Stanley Matthews. Mannion had played 26 times for England in the immediate postwar years, and was a regular goalscorer for Middlesbrough at club level.
- 16 April 2000: Harry Clarke, 77, was ever-present in the title winning team of 1951 for Tottenham Hotspur, his only club. He played 295 league games at full-back for the North Londoners between 1949 and 1956, and won an England cap in 1954. After retiring as a player, he served the club as a coach.
- 9 June 2000: Shay Brennan, 63, made his Manchester United debut as a left-winger in February 1958 in the first game after the Munich air disaster, the position left vacant by the death of David Pegg and injury to Albert Scanlon. He was soon converted to a left-back and remained at United until 1970, collecting two league title medals, an FA Cup winner's medal and a European Cup winner's medal as well as playing 355 league games. Despite being born in Manchester, he qualified for play for the Republic of Ireland due to his ancestry and was capped 19 times. He later managed Waterford in the Irish leagues and lived in Ireland until his sudden death from a heart attack.
