= 2000 FA Women's Cup final =

2000 FA Women's Cup Final
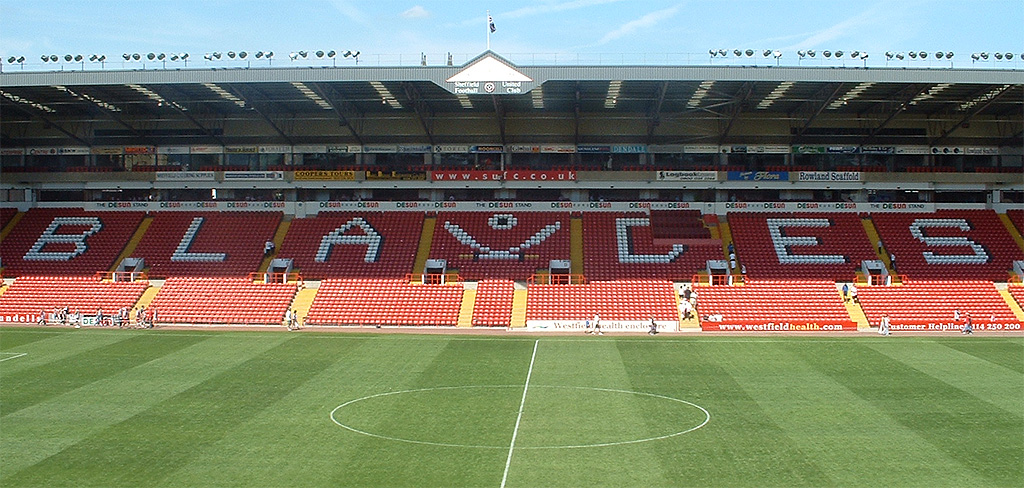
- Event: 1999–2000 FA Women's Cup
Doncaster Belles	Croydon
1	2
- Date: 1 May 2000
- Venue: Bramall Lane, Sheffield
- Player of the Match: Pauline Cope (Croydon)
- Referee: Janie Frampton (Dorest)
- Attendance: 3,434

The 2000 FA Women's Cup Final was the 30th final of the FA Women's Cup, England's primary cup competition for women's football teams. It was the seventh final to be held under the direct control of the Football Association (FA). The match was contested by Doncaster Belles and Croydon Women at Bramall Lane in Sheffield on 1 May 2000. Croydon made its third final appearance, after winning in 1996 but losing the 1998 final. Doncaster Belles entered a record 12th final having won the trophy on six previous occasions.

Croydon entered the competition at the fourth round stage and beat Tranmere Rovers, Liverpool, Everton and Leeds United to reach the final. Doncaster Belles also entered at the fourth round and faced Brighton & Hove Albion, Garswood Saints, Wembley Mill Hill and holders Arsenal before reaching the final. Doncaster's 3–2 semi final victory over Arsenal took place at Field Mill before Sky Sports television cameras.

It was reported that Doncaster had been gripped by Cup final excitement after the Belles reached the final for the first time in six years. The club laid on coaches for the short trip to Bramall Lane and an official Cup final song, Northern Pride, was recorded by the team.

Croydon won the match 2–1, with goals from Carmaine Walker and Gemma Hunt. Vicky Exley had equalised for the Belles, while Karen Walker had a penalty kick saved by Croydon goalkeeper Pauline Cope.

Hunt's winning goal was disputed, with Doncaster players arguing the ball had not crossed the goal line.

== Match details ==
1 May 2000
15:00 BST

Doncaster Belles	1–2	Croydon
Exley 37'	Report	Walker 23'; Hunt 65'

Bramall Lane, Sheffield
Attendance: 3,434
Referee: Janie Frampton (Dorset)

Doncaster Belles	Croydon

GK	1	(England) Leanne Hall
RCB	2	(England) Lizzie Gomersall
CB	5	(England) Claire Utley
LCB	6	(England) Michelle Jackson
RWB	7	(Republic of Ireland) Denise Thomas	(substituted off) 68'
RCM	11	(England) Vicky Exley
CM	8	(England) Gillian Coultard (c)
LCM	4	(England) Mandy Lowe
LWB	3	(England) Aran Embleton
FW	10	(England) Melanie Garside	(substituted off) 82'
FW	9	(England) Karen Walker
Substitutes:
FW	12	(England) Gail Borman	(substituted on) 68'
MF	14	(England) Sarah Abrahams	(substituted on) 82'
FW	15	(England) Jo Torr
DF	16	(England) Lizzie Howden
DF	17	(England) Emma Glenc
Manager:
(England) Julie Chipchase

GK	1	(England) Pauline Cope
RCB	6	(England) Kyproulla Loizou
CB	5	(Northern Ireland) Gill Wylie (c)
LCB	2	(England) Sharon Barber	(yellow card) 63'
RW	7	(England) Emily Arnold
RCM	4	(England) Gemma Hunt		(substituted off) 82'
LCM	8	(England) Debbie Bampton
LW	3	(England) Julie Fletcher	(yellow card) 90'
CAM	10	(England) Joanne Broadhurst
FW	9	(England) Carmaine Walker	(yellow card) 90+1'
FW	11	(England) Tara Proctor
Substitutes:
DF	12	(England) Tina Mapes		(substituted on) 82'
DF	14	(England) Julie Darby
FW	15	(England) Alexa Hunn
DF	16	(England) Alex Cottier
GK	17	(England) Andrea Cowan
Player/Manager:
(England) Debbie Bampton

Player of the match
Pauline Cope (Croydon)

Assistant referees:
Gillian Armstrong
S. Robinson
Fourth official:
J. H. Benfold

Match rules

- 90 minutes.
- 30 minutes of extra-time if necessary.
- Penalty shoot-out if scores still level.
- Five named substitutes.
- Maximum of three substitutions.
