= 1999–2000 FA Women's Cup =

Tournament details
- Country: England & Wales

Final positions
- Champions: Croydon
- Runners-up: Doncaster Belles
- Penalty shoot-outs do not count towards the total number of goals.

The 1999–2000 FA Women's Cup was an association football knockout tournament for women's teams, held between 12 September 1999 and 1 May 2000. It was the 30th season of the FA Women's Cup and was won by Croydon, who defeated Doncaster Belles in the final.

The tournament consisted of two qualifying rounds and eight rounds of competition proper.

All match results and dates from the Women's FA Cup Website.

== Extra preliminary round ==
All games were played on 12 September 1999.

Tie	Home team (tier)	Score	Away team (tier)	Att.
1	Barnstaple Town	3–8	Dorchester	
2	Billesley United	5–0	Kettering Amazons	
3	Bishop's Stortford	2–3	Witney Town	
4	Bolton Wanderers (Supporters)	1–0	Barnsley	
5	Bristol United	1–2	Penzance	
6	Burnley Borough	4–3	Stockport Celtic	
7	Cogan Coronation	1–4	North Molton Sports	
8	Corwen	0–5	Preston	
9	Darlington	5–2	Morley Spurs	
10	Elmore Eagles	1–7	Okeford United	
11	Hackney	5–1	Newport Pagnell Town	
12	Haverhill Rovers	2–6	Woking	
13	Hull City	H–W	Bridge Ladies (Rochdale)	
Walkover for Hull City
14	Kidderminster Harriers	4–0	Tipton Town	
15	Killingworth	4–2	Lancaster City	
16	Kirklees	0–8	Stockport County	
17	Leicester City	0–0 (3–1 p)	Atherstone United	
18	Leicester Vixens	6–2	Willenhall Town	

Tie	Home team (tier)	Score	Away team (tier)	Att.
19	Leighton Linslade	0–4	Chesham United	
20	London Women	1–0	King's Lynn	
21	Malling	2–3	Basingstoke Town	
22	Manchester City	26–0	Norton	
23	Newham	A–W	Gillingham	
Walkover for Gillingham
24	North Prospect Oak Villa	3–6	Corfe Hills United	
25	Penryn	H–W	Mousehole	
Walkover for Penryn
26	Redbridge Raiders	A–W	London Ladies	
Walkover for London Ladies
27	Scunthorpe United	7–2	Brazil Girls	
28	Selby Town	1–2	Newsham Park Hospital	
29	Stafford Rangers	0–1	Lichfield Diamonds	
30	Stanway	2–1	Hastings Town	
31	Steel City Wanderers	5–0	ES Barwell	
32	Swindon Spitfires	0–2	Red Star Southampton	
33	Thorpe United	2–4	Trafford	
34	Tottenham Hotspur	6–0	Teynham Gunners	
35	Walkern	A–W	Haywards Heath Town	
Walkover for Haywards Heath Town
36	West Bromwich Albion	0–4	Nottingham Forest	

== Preliminary round ==
All games were played on 26 September 1999.

Tie	Home team (tier)	Score	Away team (tier)	Att.
1	AFC Preston	5–0	Wigan	
2	Basingstoke Town	2–2 (4–2 p)	Maidstone United	
3	Belper Town	2–1	Nettleham	
4	Billericay Town	2–3	Tesco Country Club	
5	Billesley United	2–3 (a.e.t.)	Loughborough Students	
6	Bolton Wanderers (Supporters)	5–4	Hull City	
7	Calverton MW	H–W	Piccadilly Panthers	
Walkover for Calverton MW
8	Cambridge United	2–4	Queens Park Rangers	
9	Carlisle Wanderers	1–2	Billingham	
10	Chesham United	7–1	Redbridge Wanderers	
11	Deans	2–4	Darlington	
12	Dorchester	2–8	Okeford United	
13	Exeter Rangers	1–5	Clevedon	
14	Gillingham	2–4	Croydon Postal	
15	Grantham Town	0–1	Kidderminster Harriers	
16	Keynsham Town	1–2	North Molton Sports	

Tie	Home team (tier)	Score	Away team (tier)	Att.
17	Killingworth	8–5	Kippax Welfare	
18	Leicester City	3–2	Ilkeston	
19	Leicester Vixens	0–3	Nottingham Forest	
20	Lichfield Diamonds	2–3	Bromsgrove Rovers	
21	London Women	4–3	Barnet Copthall	
22	Luton	5–1	Welwyn Garden City	
23	Newton Aycliffe	0–10	Bury	
24	Penryn	0–5	Corfe Hills United	
25	Penzance	0–1	Red Star Southampton	
26	Rangers	2–7	Woking	
27	Sheffield Hallam United	1–14	Burnley Borough	
28	Slough	5–0	London Ladies	
29	Stanway	4–0	Haywards Heath Town	
30	Steel City Wanderers	1–3	Loughborough Dynamo	
31	Stockport County	1–1 (4–3 p)	Chorley	
32	Trafford	2–1	Manchester City	
33	Tring	1–8	Tottenham Hotspur	
34	Wakefield	2–6	Scunthorpe United	
35	Warrington Grange	2–1	Newsham Park Hospital	
36	West Ham United	10–1	Hackney	
37	Witney Town	0–10	Fulham	

== First round proper ==
All games were scheduled for 10 October 1999.

Tie	Home team (tier)	Score	Away team (tier)	Att.
1	Belper Town	5–0	Loughborough Dynamo	
2	Blackpool Wren Rovers	4–0	Newcastle	
3	Bristol City	3–2	Oxford United	
4	Burnley Borough	1–11	Leeds City Vixens	
5	Bury	5–3	Warrington Grange	
6	Calverton MW	0–9	Telford United	
7	Charlton	2–1	Bedford Town Bells	
8	Corfe Hills United	2–1	Yeovil Town	
9	Croydon Postal	4–0	Slough	
10	Darlington	3–4	Trafford	
11	Denham United	4–1	Clevedon	
12	Doncaster Rovers	4–1	Bolton Wanderers (Supporters)	
13	Enfield	10–1	Stanway	
14	Fulham	16–1	Abbey Rangers	
15	Highfield Rangers	A–W	Kidderminster Harriers	
Walkover for Kidderminster Harriers
16	London Women	4–2	Maidstone United	
17	Luton	2–3	Clapton	
18	Manchester United	4–3	Oldham Curzon	
19	Mansfield Town	2–4	Loughborough Students	
20	Middlesbrough	0–2	Preston North End	

Tie	Home team (tier)	Score	Away team (tier)	Att.
21	Newcastle Town	6–0	Rea Valley Rovers	
22	Newport Strikers	4–1	Saltash Pilgrims	
23	North Molton Sports	4–2	Red Star Southampton	
24	Nottingham Forest	2–1	Derby County	
25	Peterborough United	2–1	Chesterfield	
26	Queens Park Rangers	0–5	Chelsea	
27	Racers	0–1 (a.e.t.)	Wyrley Rangers	
28	Scunthorpe United	5–4 (a.e.t.)	Killingworth	
29	Shrewsbury Town	4–4 (3–2 p)	Leicester City	
30	Southampton	0–6	Okeford United	
31	Stockport	2–1	Billingham	
32	Stockport County	4–3	AFC Preston	
33	Stowmarket	5–0	Bromsgrove Rovers	
34	Swindon Town	2–5	Bristol Rovers	
35	Tesco Country Club	0–1	Hampton	
36	Tottenham Hotspur	5–0	Chesham United	
37	Watford	4–3	Northampton Town & County	
38	West Ham United	2–1	Portsmouth	
39	Woking	0–2	Crowborough Athletic	
40	Worksop Town	0–3	Blackburn Rovers	

== Second round proper ==
All games were originally scheduled for 7 and 14 November 1999.

Tie	Home team (tier)	Score	Away team (tier)	Att.
1	Belper Town	0–3	Bury	
2	Blackburn Rovers	2–1	Doncaster Rovers	
3	Bristol City	5–4	Corfe Hills United	
4	Chelsea	2–1	West Ham United	
5	Crowborough Athletic	2–3	Peterborough United	
6	Croydon Postal	1–5	Bristol Rovers	
7	Enfield	9–1	North Molton Sports	
8	Fulham	5–0	Okeford United	
9	Hampton	3–3 (4–3 p)	Clapton	
10	Kidderminster Harriers	6–8	Charlton	

Tie	Home team (tier)	Score	Away team (tier)	Att.
11	Leeds City Vixens	6–1	Stockport	
12	Loughborough Students	1–1 (3–1 p)	Telford United	
13	Newport Strikers	3–1	Denham United	
14	Nottingham Forest	1–1 (12–13 p)	Wyrley Rangers	
15	Preston North End	1–0	Manchester United	
16	Scunthorpe United	2–3	Blackpool Wren Rovers	
17	Shrewsbury Town	1–3	Stockport County	
18	Tottenham Hotspur	1–1 (8–7 p)	Stowmarket	
19	Trafford	2–1	Newcastle Town	
20	Watford	6–4 (a.e.t.)	London Women	

== Third round proper ==
All games were originally scheduled for 12 and 18 December 1999 and 9 January 2000.

Tie	Home team (tier)	Score	Away team (tier)	Att.
1	Birmingham City	2–1 (a.e.t.)	Arnold Town	
2	Barking	8–2	Peterborough United	
3	Bury	2–2 (3–1 p)	Blackburn Rovers	
4	Blyth Spartans Kestrels	1–0	Blackpool Wren Rovers	
5	Bradford City	1–2	Trafford	
6	Bristol City	0–2	Tottenham Hotspur	
7	Cardiff City	2–2 (4–2 p)	Chelsea	
8	Charlton	5–0	Bristol Rovers	
9	Enfield	1–6	Ipswich Town	
10	Fulham	8–0	Berkhamsted Town	
11	Garswood Saints	4–1	Ilkeston Town	

Tie	Home team (tier)	Score	Away team (tier)	Att.
12	Wyrley Rangers	0–2	Huddersfield Town	
13	Langford	4–3 (a.e.t.)	Barnet	
14	Leeds United	9–0	Stockport County	
15	Loughborough Students	1–0	Bangor City	
16	Newport Strikers	2–1	Hampton	
17	Preston North End	0–4	Sheffield Wednesday	
18	Watford	1–3	Coventry City	
19	Wembley Mill Hill	1–1 (4–3 p)	Barry Town	
20	Whitehawk	0–6	Brighton & Hove Albion	
21	Wimbledon	3–1	Three Bridges	
22	Leeds City Vixens	0–6	Wolverhampton Wanderers	

== Fourth round proper ==
All games were originally scheduled for 9 and 16 January 2000.

9 January 2000	Aston Villa (1)	0–5	Liverpool (2)
		Report	Goal

9 January 2000	Blyth Spartans Kestrels (2)	3–2	Sheffield Wednesday (2)
	Goal	Report	Goal

9 January 2000	Bury Girls & Ladies (3)	1–1 (a.e.t.) (5–4 p)	Tottenham Hotspur (3)
	Goal	Report	Goal
	Penalties
	Penalty scored		Penalty scored Penalty missed

9 January 2000	Cardiff City (2)	1–8	Arsenal (1)
	Goal	Report	Banks 4'; Spacey 25'; Yankey 26'; Few

9 January 2000	Croydon (1)	4–0	Tranmere Rovers (1)
	Goal	Report

9 January 2000	Everton (1)	6–0	Coventry City (2)	Crosby
	21' (o.g.); Easton 25'; Gore 72'; Marley 82'; Burke 84'; Barr 87'	Report		Stadium: Rossett Park

9 January 2000	Loughborough Students (3)	2–1 (a.e.t.)	Ipswich Town (2)
	Goal	Report	Goal

9 January 2000	Reading Royals (1)	3–2	Millwall Lionesses (2)
	Goal	Report	Goal

16 January 2000	Charlton (3)	0–3	Wolverhampton Wanderers (2)
		Report	Goal

16 January 2000	Doncaster Belles (1)	1–0	Brighton & Hove Albion (2)	Hatfield
	Garside 78'	Report		Stadium: Welfare Ground

16 January 2000	Garswood Saints (2)	5–2	Langford (2)
	Goal	Report	Goal

16 January 2000	Leeds United (2)	2–1	Wimbledon (2)
	Goal	Report	Goal

16 January 2000	Newport Strikers (3)	0–3	Fulham (3)
		Report	Goal

16 January 2000	Southampton Saints (1)	5–0	Huddersfield Town (2)	Totton
	Goal	Report		Stadium: Testwood Stadium

16 January 2000	Trafford (3)	2–3	Barking (2)
	Goal	Report	Goal

16 January 2000	Wembley Mill Hill (2)	5–1	Birmingham City (2)	Wembley
	Goal	Report	Goal	Stadium: Vale Farm; Referee: Mr M Ford (Stoneleigh)

== Fifth round proper ==
All games were played on 6 and 13 February 2000.

6 February 2000	Arsenal (1)	5–0	Reading Royals (1)	Borehamwood
	Yankey; Banks; Spacey; Grant	Report		Stadium: Meadow Park

6 February 2000	Everton (1)	6–2	Blyth Spartans Kestrels (2)	Crosby
	Barr 24', 45', 70'; Britton 56'; Jones 75'; Burke 90'	Report	Langrish 25'; Reay 36'	Stadium: Rossett Park

6 February 2000	Fulham (3)	3–0	Barking (2)
	Goal	Report

6 February 2000	Leeds United (2)	3–2	Southampton Saints (1)
	Goal	Report	Goal

6 February 2000	Liverpool (1)	0–4	Croydon (1)
		Report	Goal

6 February 2000	Wembley Mill Hill (2)	3–0	Loughborough Students (3)
	Goal	Report

6 February 2000	Wolverhampton Wanderers (2)	7–0	Bury Girls & Ladies (3)	Willenhall
	Goal	Report		Stadium: Noose Lane

13 February 2000	Garswood Saints (2)	0–4	Doncaster Belles (1)
		Report	Walker 15'; Coulthard 43'; Exley; Garside

== Quarter–finals ==
All games were played on 27 February 2000.

27 February 2000	Doncaster Belles (1)	3–0	Wembley Mill Hill (2)
	Garside; Embleton	Report

27 February 2000	Everton (1)	1–2	Croydon (1)	Crosby
	Easton 82'	Report	Broadhurst 55' (pen.); Hunt 62'	Stadium: Rossett Park

27 February 2000	Fulham (3)	0–7	Arsenal (1)	New Malden
		Report	Spacey; Banks; White	Stadium: Motspur Park

27 February 2000	Wolverhampton Wanderers (2)	0–1	Leeds United (2)
		Report	Pollard 80'

== Semi–finals ==
All games were played on 25 March 2000.

25 March 2000	Doncaster Belles (1)	3–2	Arsenal (1)	Mansfield
	Jackson 3'; Walker 44'; Garside 61'	Report	Grant 8'; Spacey 37' (pen.)	Stadium: Field Mill; Referee: Wendy Toms

26 March 2000	Leeds United (2)	1–2	Croydon (1)	Ossett
	Ward	Report	Broadhurst; Bampton	Stadium: Ingfield; Referee: Mr G L Armstrong

== Final ==
1 May 2000
15:00 BST

Doncaster Belles	1–2	Croydon
Exley 37'	Report	Walker 23'; Hunt 65'

Bramall Lane, Sheffield
Attendance: 3,434
Referee: Janie Frampton (Dorest)
