= Julie Chipchase =

British footballer and football club manager (1961–2021)

- Chipchase in 1992

Personal information
- Date of birth: 13 January 1961
- Date of death: 4 May 2021 (aged 60)
- Place of death: Rotherham, England
- Position: Defender

Senior career*
Years	Team	Apps	(Gls)
- Kilnhurst
- Sheffield
1989–1994	Doncaster Belles		

Managerial career
- 1996–2003: Doncaster Belles
- 2003–2007: Leeds United
- 2013–2021: Doncaster Rovers Belles (director of football)
- * Club domestic league appearances and goals

Julie Chipchase (13 January 1961 – 4 May 2021) was an English football player and manager. Commonly known as Chippy, she is regarded as a pioneering female football coach who played an important role in the development of women's football in England.

In a long association with Doncaster Rovers Belles, Chipchase served the club as a player, manager and director of football. She managed Leeds United for four years, and also spent 15 years working for The Football Association in various roles.

== Career ==
=== Player ===
As a player Chipchase was a dependable full-back, who joined Doncaster Belles in 1989. She was likened to Denis Irwin by her team-mate Karen Walker. Before joining Doncaster Belles, Chipchase had previously played for Kilnhurst and Sheffield.

With Doncaster Belles Chipchase won the Women's FA Cup in her first season, 1990, and played in five consecutive finals, winning in 1992 and 1994 but losing in 1991 and 1993. In 1992 and 1994 the club also won the FA Women's Premier League National Division to complete League and Cup "doubles".

=== Coach ===
==== Doncaster Belles ====
Chipchase maintained an interest in coaching during her playing career. She coached netball and hockey, as well as football, while she was employed in local leisure centres. After her playing career ended she joined the coaching staff at Doncaster Belles, initially as the reserve team coach.

In 1996 Chipchase was appointed as the Doncaster Belles manager. In September 1997 she ascribed the loss of the Belles' pre-eminent status to a rise in the standards of other teams. In 1996–97 the club was knocked out of both Cups by eventual winners Millwall Lionesses, and finished second in the League to Arsenal.

The next two seasons saw third-placed finishes for the Belles, while 1999–00 resulted in another Women's FA Cup final appearance when holders Arsenal were beaten in the semi-final. The final at Bramall Lane ended in a 2–1 defeat by Croydon. Five days later Croydon became the first club to retain the National Premier Division title. Their 6–0 win over Aston Villa ensured a finish one point ahead of Chipchase's second-placed Belles. Chipchase was named Manager of the Season at the 2000 The FA Women's Football Awards.

The 2000–01 National Premier Division campaign saw the Belles return to top form, maintaining a 100% record until April, when a 1–0 home defeat by Arsenal handed the initiative to their southern rivals. Arsenal consigned the Belles to another runners-up finish in the League and also knocked Chipchase's team out of both cup competitions on their way to a domestic "treble".

In the 2001–02 National Division Doncaster Belles finished as runners-up for the third season in succession, although in April 2002 they had "stunningly" inflicted a 4–0 defeat on Arsenal, the eventual champions' first league defeat in over two-and-a-half years. In the Premier League Cup Chipchase's charges suffered a shock semi-final defeat by Birmingham City, collapsing from 3–1 ahead to lose 4–3 to the Northern Division leaders.

The Belles knocked holders Arsenal out of the Women's FA Cup in the quarter-finals, ending a run of six successive defeats—stretching back almost two years—against their old rivals. The BBC reported that the final whistle was "joyously celebrated" by the Doncaster Belles players. In the 2002 FA Women's Cup Final Chipchase's Doncaster Belles lost 2–1 to full-time professional Fulham before a crowd of 10,000 at Selhurst Park and a live television audience of two and a half million.

==== Leeds United ====
In June 2003 Chipchase accepted an approach from Leeds United Ladies and left Doncaster Belles to manage their Yorkshire rivals. The move was seen as surprising as she had recently guided the Belles to their fourth consecutive second place finish in the 2002–03 Premier League National Division, while Leeds had only played at the top level for two seasons, finishing seventh in 2002–03.

After an opening day defeat by Charlton Athletic, Chipchase presided over a conspicuous improvement in Leeds's form. By December 2003 they were third in the League table, enjoying "their best-ever season". Chipchase placed a strong emphasis on youth development at Leeds, promoting young players including Sophie Walton, Natalie Haigh and Jessica Clarke into the first team ahead of the 2005–06 season.

Chipchase guided Leeds United to the FA Women's Cup final for the first time in 2006, but they were beaten 5–0 by a dominant Arsenal team. She was disappointed by the concession of an early own-goal and admitted her tactical error of giving Nicole Emmanuel a marking job on Kelly Smith.

In January 2007, Chipchase took her Leeds United team to face Doncaster Rovers Belles at the Keepmoat Stadium, the Belles' first game at the new home stadium they shared with Doncaster Rovers and Doncaster Lakers. A 5–2 win kept Leeds second in the League table, behind Arsenal. In March 2007, Leeds reached the final of the FA Women's Premier League Cup. Despite a much improved defensive performance, Leeds lost 1–0 to an injury-time goal from Arsenal's Jayne Ludlow.

Chipchase resigned from her job at Leeds United in June 2007, after four years in charge. She wanted to focus on her work and other commitments.

==== The Football Association ====
Chipchase was the sixth female in England to obtain the UEFA A Licence. She studied for the award alongside Hope Powell as the only two women in a group of male candidates. When Powell set up a mentoring scheme for female coaches, Chipchase was among seven participants.

In June 2009, Chipchase was the only female candidate in The Football Association's (FA) intake for that year's UEFA Pro Licence.

She worked with the England women's Under-15 and Under-17 teams. In May 2015 Chipchase took the England women's national under-23 football team to the Nordic Cup when the usual coach Marieanne Spacey was with the senior national team at the 2015 FIFA Women's World Cup in Canada. Chipchase and Spacey then ran The FA's first female-only UEFA B Licence course at Worcester University in 2015–16.

By 2017 Chipchase was among the most highly-qualified football coaches in England.

==== Return to Doncaster Belles ====
In 2013 she became director of football and a board member at Doncaster Rovers Belles. Her appointment resulted in the departure of manager John Buckley, who was unhappy he had not been consulted on the matter. Chipchase remained in both positions until her death. She had instigated a female coach mentoring scheme at the club.

== Death and legacy ==
"There weren't a lot of female coaches around who were visible for me when I started coaching, but 'Chippy' was one of them. Having role models and people to aspire towards who are working with England squads and those sorts of things is just invaluable, and I'm certainly grateful for having known her."

— Rehanne Skinner on Chipchase

Chipchase died on 4 May 2021, aged 60, after a short illness later reported to be cancer. A minute's applause for Chipchase preceded every fixture in the next round of FA WSL games, while FIFA made a statement praising her "passion and knowledge".

Several former players who had worked under Chipchase, including pundits Sue Smith and Lucy Ward, spoke of their sadness at Chipchase's untimely death and admiration for her achievements. Jacqui Oatley noted that Chipchase's death received relatively little attention, as she had started out in an era when women's football received much less media coverage.

On 8 August 2021, Leeds United Women defeated Doncaster Rovers Belles 2–0 in the first annual Julie Chipchase Memorial Match, staged at Tadcaster Albion. The event raised £1,000 for breast cancer research.

In August 2024 new permanent portraits of Chipchase and Belles founder Sheila Edmunds were presented inside the Eco-Power Stadium. A bursary fund for female coaches – The Julie Chipchase Coaching Legacy – was also announced.

== Personal life ==
Chipchase had six brothers, who developed her interest in football. She also had two children of her own, a son and a daughter. At the Sheffield Star Football Awards in August 2021, Chipchase's posthumous "Pioneer of Women's Football Award" was collected by her partner Jo Broadhurst.

== Honours ==
=== As player ===
Doncaster Rovers Belles

- FA Women's Premier League National Division: 1991–92, 1993–94
- FA Women's Cup: 1990, 1992, 1994

=== As manager ===
Doncaster Rovers Belles

- FA Women's Cup: runners-up 2000, 2002

Leeds United Women

- FA Women's Cup: runners-up 2006
- FA Women's Premier League Cup: runners-up 2007
