= Denise Thomas =

English footballer (born 1979)

Personal information
- Full name: Denise Anne Thomas
- Date of birth: 22 December 1979 (age 46)
- Height: 5 ft 6 in (1.68 m)
- Position: Midfielder

Youth career
- Chesterfield
- 2000–2001: CCSU Blue Devils
- 2003–2004: CCSU Blue Devils

Senior career*
Years	Team	Apps	(Gls)
–2000	Doncaster Belles		
2002	Sunderland		
2002	Leeds United		
2005–2007	Boston Renegades		

International career^{‡}
2003–	Republic of Ireland		
- * Club domestic league appearances and goals as of 12:00, 17 September 2011 (UTC) ‡ National team caps and goals as of 12:00, 23 September 2011 (UTC)

Denise Anne Thomas (born 22 December 1979) is a former international Association football player and CrossFit practitioner. She represented Ireland at senior level and played club football in England with Doncaster Belles and Leeds United, as well as in America with Boston Renegades.

Thomas, from Rotherham, began her career in the youth ranks of Chesterfield Ladies. She moved on to Doncaster Belles and played in the Yorkshire club's 2000 FA Women's Cup Final defeat. Thomas moved to America that summer on a college scholarship to Central Connecticut State University. She was named Northeast Conference Rookie of the Year in 2000 and Player of the Year in 2001.

In February 2002 Thomas returned from America and signed for Sunderland, who were bottom of the Premier League National Division. When Sunderland were relegated she moved to Leeds United and enrolled at the Football Association (FA) Player Development Centre at Loughborough University. She had also been approached by Birmingham City manager Marcus Bignot during the summer. In the middle of the 2002–03 season Thomas left Leeds and went back to America to complete her degree.

Thomas joined W-League club Boston Renegades for their 2005 season. In 2008, she was introduced to CrossFit and began competing the following year.
