= Alexa Hunn =

English footballer

Personal information
- Full name: Alexa Hunn-Phillips
- Birth name: Alexa Hunn
- Position: Midfielder

Senior career*
Years	Team	Apps	(Gls)
- Croydon

International career
2003	England	1	(0)
- * Club domestic league appearances and goals

Alexa Hunn-Phillips (née Hunn) is a former England women's international footballer. Hunn played for Charlton Athletic. Hunn represented England at U16, U18 and senior level. Whilst playing at U16 level for England vs Scotland at Wembley, Hunn scored a solo goal, later compared to that of Maradona's against England in 1986. Domestically Hunn was part of the Croydon Women's FA Cup winning squad in the 2000 FA Women's Cup final and for Charlton in the 2005 FA Women's Cup final. She also played in the 2003 and 2004 finals which both resulted in defeats for Charlton.

== International career ==
In November 2022, Hunn was recognized by The Football Association as one of the England national team's legacy players, and as the 150th women's player to be capped by England.

== Honours ==
Charlton

- FA Women's Cup: 2000, 2005
