= Minsthorpe Community College =

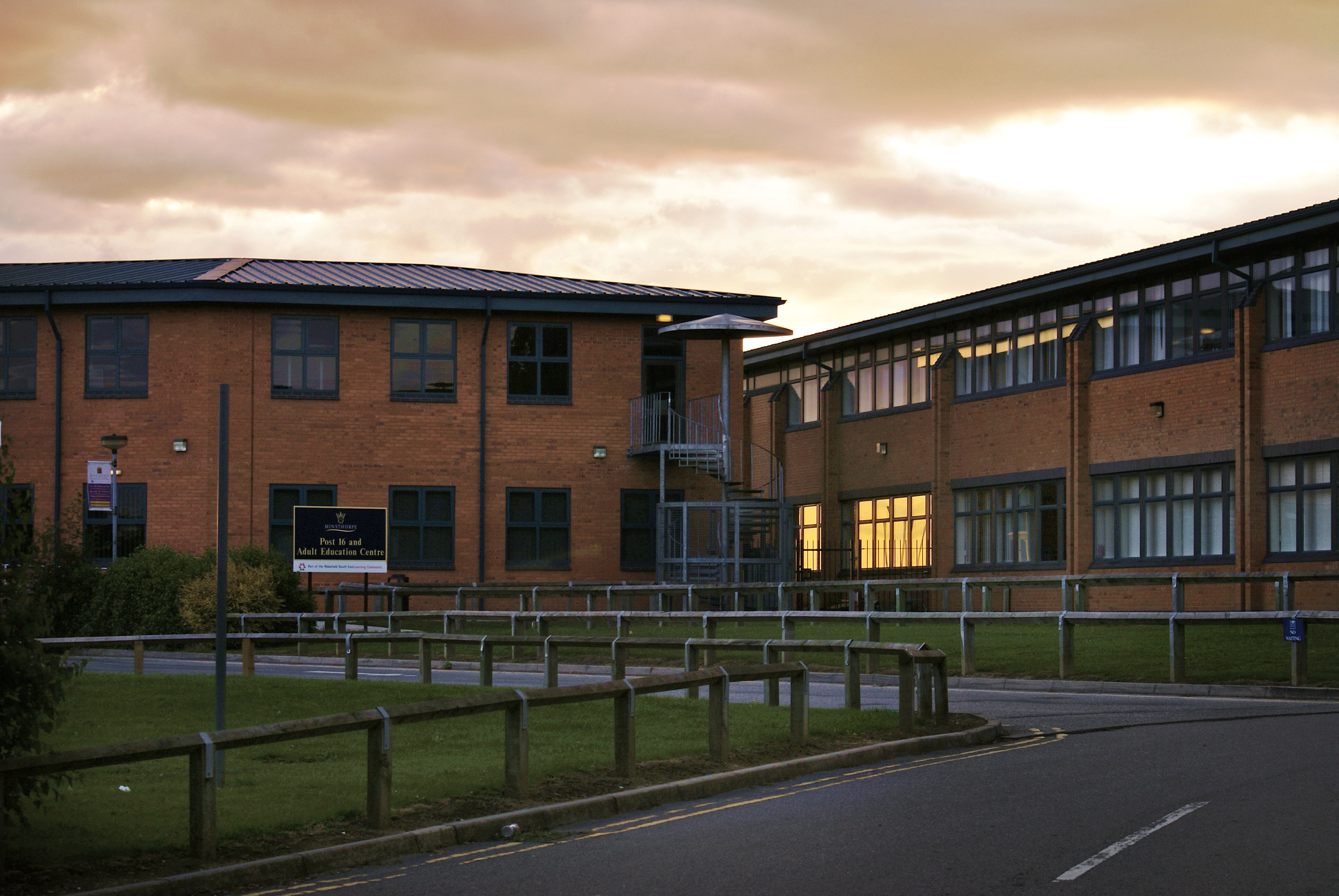

Location
- Minsthorpe Lane; South Elmsall, West Yorkshire, WF9 2UJ; England; 53.60255°N 1.29096°W

Information
- Type: Academy
- Motto: Motivation, Commitment and Care
- Local authority: City of Wakefield
- Department for Education URN: 137011 Tables
- Ofsted: Reports
- Gender: Coeducational
- Age: 11 to 18
- Website: https://minsthorpe.cc

Minsthorpe Community College is a coeducational secondary school with academy status in South Elmsall, West Yorkshire, England. It is specifically for students aged eleven to eighteen. It is situated on Minsthorpe Lane in the Minsthorpe district, north of the town.

== History ==
It was opened in 1969 by Prince Philip, Duke of Edinburgh as an upper school - Minsthorpe High School, when Wakefield LEA operated a three-tier education system.

In August 2024, the school was used as a filming location for the Netflix miniseries Adolescence. The show does not use the school’s real name and instead substitutes Minsthorpe for Bruntwood. Adolescence premiered on 13 March 2025 on Netflix.

== Facilities ==
Wakefield College has two adult education courses at the school, one being in Beauty Therapy. Minsthorpe Community College also has a day care centre on the site named "Happy Days Children's Centre" and a Sports and Fitness Centre open to the whole community as well as its students, who are aged 15 or above.

== Alumni ==
- John Godber (1969–74 as Minsthorpe High) - also returned as a teacher, becoming Head of Drama.
- Claire Utley (1992–95 as Minsthorpe High) - England footballer.

=== Teachers ===
- David Hopkins (Humanities 1973–5) became Chief Advisor of School Standards at the DFES.
