= Claire Utley =

English footballer (born 1979)

Personal information
- Date of birth: 11 February 1979 (age 47)
- Place of birth: South Elmsall, England
- Height: 5 ft 4 in (1.63 m)
- Position: Defender

Youth career
- Doncaster Rovers Belles

Senior career*
Years	Team	Apps	(Gls)
1994–2002	Doncaster Rovers Belles		
2002–2003	Leeds United Ladies		
2003–2010	Doncaster Rovers Belles		
2010	Whitley Bay Ladies		

International career
1998–2000	England	4	(0)
- * Club domestic league appearances and goals as of 11:58, 12 August 2009 (UTC)

Claire Utley (born 11 February 1979) is an English former football defender, best known for her long association with Doncaster Rovers Belles. Utley represented England four times at senior international level.

== Club career ==
In summer 1994 three players from Doncaster Belles' double-winning team left for Liverpool Ladies. As a result, Minsthorpe High School pupil Utley was drafted into the first team as a fifteen-year-old centre-back, making her debut in a 7–1 home win against Millwall Lionesses on the opening day of the 1994–95 season. In October 1994 she featured in the FA Women's Premier League Cup final, held over from the previous season, as the Belles were beaten 4–0 by Arsenal Ladies.

Utley was nicknamed Des after Des Walker. She suffered an Anterior Cruciate Ligament injury in April 2001 and missed a year of action, returning for the Belles' 2–1 defeat to Fulham in the 2002 FA Women's Cup final. She then spent a short spell at Leeds United in 2002–03.

In 2004 Doncaster Belles suffered an exodus of players after a financial crisis, however, Utley and Vicky Exley chose to remain loyal to the club.

She joined Whitley Bay ahead of season 2010–11. After two appearances that season, Utley left the club.

== International career ==
After breaking through at Doncaster Belles, Utley was thought likely to play for England "as sure as the sun shines on the Sahara."

Utley eventually won four caps for the senior England women's national football team. She has legacy number 130 for England. The FA announced their legacy numbers scheme to honour the 50th anniversary of England’s inaugural international.
