= Aman Dosanj =

English footballer

Personal information
- Full name: Amanprit Kaur Dosanj
- Place of birth: Southampton, England
- Height: 5 ft 2 in (1.57 m)
- Position: Goalkeeper

Senior career*
Years	Team	Apps	(Gls)
1994–2000	Southampton Saints		
2000–2002	Arsenal Ladies		

International career
1999	England U16		
- * Club domestic league appearances and goals as of 14:38, 26 October 2010 (UTC)

Amanprit "Aman" Kaur Dosanj is an English former footballer who played as a goalkeeper. She is the first British South Asian footballer to represent England at any level.

Dosanj went on to be employed by the Football Association as an ambassador. She also worked with the 'Football For All' and 'Kick It Out' campaigns.

== Club career ==
At the age of six, Dosanj was the only female player in her school football team. She joined Red Star Southampton which later came to be known as Southampton Saints at the age of ten and was coached by former England goalkeeper Sue Buckett. At 16 Dosanj signed for Arsenal Ladies, the team she supported as a child. She juggled training and playing with studying for her A-levels.

In 2002, 18-year-old Dosanj won a scholarship to Lee University in Cleveland, Tennessee. Dosanj's goalkeeping career was brought to an end by a serious knee injury.

== International career ==
In April 1999, while playing for Southampton Saints' reserve team, Dosanj represented England U-16s in a five-nations tournament in Dublin. In doing so she notably became the first British South Asian to play football for England at any level. Dosanj described her international debut as "the proudest and most memorable day of my life."

== Personal life ==
Dosanj's Indian heritage made her a role model for aspiring British Asian footballers, and in 2004 she was employed by the Football Association (FA) as an ambassador. She was presented with a certificate by FA chief executive Mark Palios. she became a prominent anti-racism campaigner, speaking out against racism in football while working for the Kick It Out initiative.

The football career of Dosanj - a Sikh - was likened to that of Parminder Nagra's character in the 2002 film Bend It Like Beckham. Nagra said of Dosanj: "I think it is brilliant that there is someone out there who is so close to the story, who is going out to the States and pursuing her dream. Good for Aman, I hope she does really well."

In 2008 Dosanj moved with her family from Southampton to Kelowna, Canada. She went on a year later to open a contemporary Indian restaurant called Poppadoms in Kelowna.

Dosanj has spoken about the challenges she faced during her playing career due to her ADHD, which was not diagnosed until later.
