= Mikaela Howell =

English footballer

Personal information
- Date of birth: 12 July 1988 (age 38)
- Position: Forward

Youth career
- Southampton Women
- 1999–2005: Arsenal

College career
Years	Team	Apps	(Gls)
2011–2012	Monroe Mustangs	26	(53)

Senior career*
Years	Team	Apps	(Gls)
2005–2006	Fulham		
2006–2007	Chelsea		
2007–2009	Watford		
2009–2010	Birmingham City		
2010–2011	Reading		
2008, 2011	New York Magic		
2011–2012	D.C. United Women		
2012–2013	Newcastle Jets	3	(0)
2020	Sky Blue FC	1	(0)

International career
- England U15
	England U17	5	
- * Club domestic league appearances and goals

Mikaela Howell (born 12 July 1988) is an English professional footballer who last played as a midfielder for Sky Blue FC of the National Women's Soccer League (NWSL).

== Club career ==
=== Sky Blue FC ===
Howell signed a short-term contract with Sky Blue FC on 2 October 2020. She made her NWSL debut on 10 October 2020.
