= Gemma Hunt (footballer) =

English footballer

Personal information
- Date of birth: 9 February 1982 (age 44)
- Place of birth: London, England
- Position: Midfielder

Gemma Hunt (born 9 February 1982) is a retired English footballer who played for Charlton Athletic. She played as a midfielder and has represented England at youth international level. Hunt's greatest achievement was scoring the winning goal in the 2000 FA Women's Cup final. Her Croydon side (who later became Charlton) beat Doncaster Belles 2‍–‍1 at Bramall Lane.

== Personal life ==
Gemma Hunt had a sister Carly Hunt who was also a professional footballer.

== Honours ==
Charlton

- FA Women's Cup: 2000
