= Rossett Park =

Football ground, home to Marine A.F.C and A.F.C Liverpool

- Interactive map of Rossett Park
- Former names: Rossett Park (1904–2005); Arriva Stadium (2006–2015); Marine Travel Arena (2015–present)
- Location: 44 Jubilee Road, Crosby, Merseyside, L23 3AS, England
- Coordinates: 53.4852°N 3.0336°W
- Owner: Marine A.F.C.
- Capacity: 2,300 (519 seated)
- Surface: 4G Artificial Turf
- Public transit: Blundellsands & Crosby

Construction
- Opened: 1884

Tenants
- Marine A.F.C. (1904–present); Everton F.C. (women) (1998–2013); A.F.C. Liverpool (2014–2025); FC Bootle (2022-present); Skelmersdale United (2025-present); Widnes Town F.C. (2026-present)

Rossett Park is a football ground in Crosby, Merseyside that has been home to Marine A.F.C. since 1904. It has been called the Marine Travel Arena for sponsorship since 2015.

Marine currently play in the National League North and share the ground with A.F.C. Liverpool in the North West Counties League Premier Division. Everton F.C.'s women's club played home matches at Rossett Park from 1998 to 2013.

Rossett Park has three sides with the primary covered stand, including the modest press area, behind one of the goals. The dugout length of the field is behind residences on Rossett Road. Marine A.F.C.'s supporters association operates a merchandise shop at the ground.

== History ==
Rossett Park has been in use for organised sport since 1884 when rugby union was played on the pitch. Marine A.F.C. was founded in 1894. The club first played its home matches at Waterloo Park, and moved one-mile north to Rossett Park in 1904.

In October 1949, the Nigerian football team toured the United Kingdom and played its first official matches against amateur and semi-professional clubs. Nigeria faced Marine at Rosset Park during this tour. While the official crowd was 4,000, many estimated 6,000 to have watched the match.

Marine defeated Barnsley F.C. 3 to 1 at Rossett Park in the first round of the 1975–76 FA Cup on 22 November 1975. Marine would draw with Hartlepool United F.C. at home in the second round, and lose in the replay at Victoria Park.

In the 1990s, Marine had won the Northern Premier League on two occasions but had been unable to accept promotion due to Rossett Park's structural limitations.

Everton F.C. women played its home fixtures at Rossett Park beginning in 1998. The club won the National Premier League in this first season. Everton women played at Rossett Park through the 2012–2013 season.

In January 2011, Marine announced plans to invest £150,000 to renovate the stadium.

During the 2012 summer off-season, Marine replaced the outdated floodlights with a contemporary four-corner system that met the Football League's minimum requirements. The club later built a 130-seat covered stand at the Crosender Road end of the ground.

On 25 January 2014, the club announced a two-year ground share agreement with North West Counties Premier Division side A.F.C. Liverpool. This arrangement continued until April 2025 when A.F.C. Liverpool agreed a groundshare with Bootle F.C. at New Bucks Park

Borussia Dortmund trained at the grounds in April 2016 prior to the club's Europa League quarter-final tie against Liverpool.

In December 2020, Marine drew Tottenham Hotspur F.C. at home in the FA Cup's third round. The match was played on 10 January 2021 and Tottenham won 0–5. On 30 December 2020, the Liverpool City region had been placed under COVID-19 restrictions that precluded the public's attendance at the match. Residents of the homes adjoining Rossett Park watched the FA Cup match from their gardens, windows, and trees. The match was broadcast across the UK on BBC One and worldwide through the FA Cup's international broadcasting partners.

Marine had estimated a sell out crowd that would generate £100,000 in revenue for the club. In place of tickets to attend the match, Marine offered and sold 30,697 "virtual tickets" and raised more than £300,000 for the club.

As a result of the FA Cup run, Marine were able to redevelop the ground's club room and function suite as a pub open to the public called the 1894 Bar & Bistro.

On the 3rd May 2022, the club began to dig up the pitch to install a new 4G pitch, after delaying it from the previous summer. This again was funded with the income from the FA Cup run in the 20–21 season.

In May 2024, Marine announced plans to build a new stadium, with a fundraising target of £5 million to enable this to happen. In December 2024, it was revealed that Marine had signed an option agreement on a plot of land for the new stadium, subject to planning and funding. In February 2025, the club revealed plans for a new 5,000 capacity stadium in Thornton.

In March 2025, the club announced a groundshare agreement with Liverpool County Premier League side Skelmersdale United for the 2025-26 season.

== Sponsorships ==
Marine A.F.C. has sold sponsorship naming rights to Rossett Park for use in advertising since 2006.

Arriva PLC transportation firm sponsored the ground between 2006 and 2015, and it was called the Arriva Stadium.

The Marine Travel Company, founded in 2002 and based in Canterbury, became Marine A.F.C.'s front of shirt sponsor in 2012. In June 2015, the Marine Travel Company signed a nine-year agreement to succeed Arriva PLC and rename Rossett Park as the Marine Travel Arena. The agreement continues through the 2023–2024 season.
