= Carly Hunt =

English footballer

Personal information
- Full name: Carly Hunt
- Date of birth: 9 February 1982 (age 44)
- Place of birth: England
- Height: 5 ft 2 in (1.57 m)
- Position: Midfielder

Senior career*
Years	Team	Apps	(Gls)
1996–1998	Millwall Lionesses		
1998–2001	Charlton Athletic		
2002–2004	Doncaster Rovers Belles		
2004	Leeds United		
2004–2007	AFC Wimbledon		

International career^{‡}
2001–2003	England	7	(0)
- * Club domestic league appearances and goals as of 30 May 2010 (UTC) ‡ National team caps and goals as of 30 May 2010 (UTC)

Carly Hunt (born 9 February 1982) is a retired English footballer. She played as a midfielder and has represented England at senior international level.

Throughout her career she played alongside her identical twin sister Gemma and they were nicknamed the rottweilers for their aggressive style of play.

== Club career ==
Hunt started playing for Millwall Lionesses' first team as a 14-year-old. The sisters switched to Croydon Women at 16 when the family moved to Dartford.

Croydon won the FA Women's Cup in 2000. Gemma scored the winning goal but Carly missed the final following a cartilage operation. The pair were strongly in favour of Charlton Athletic's controversial and hostile takeover of Croydon Women during that summer.

In December 2000 both sisters were sent off in the same match, Carly for attacking a teammate. The duo were "kicked out" of Charlton Athletic a year later after a huge squad bust-up. They made their debut for Doncaster Belles in February 2002. In September 2003 an on-pitch altercation with former Charlton teammate Carmaine Walker saw another red card for Hunt. Days later the incident spilled over into an England training session, resulting in lengthy bans for Carly and Gemma Hunt, as well as Charlton's Walker and Eartha Pond.

The Hunts left Doncaster Rovers Belles for Leeds United Ladies in 2004, but moved on to AFC Wimbledon Ladies shortly afterwards.

== International career ==
Hunt was the captain of England U-18s. She made senior appearances against Norway in 2002 and Italy in 2003.

She has England legacy number 139. The FA announced their legacy numbers scheme to honour the 50th anniversary of England's inaugural international.
