= Aran Embleton =

English footballer (born 1981)

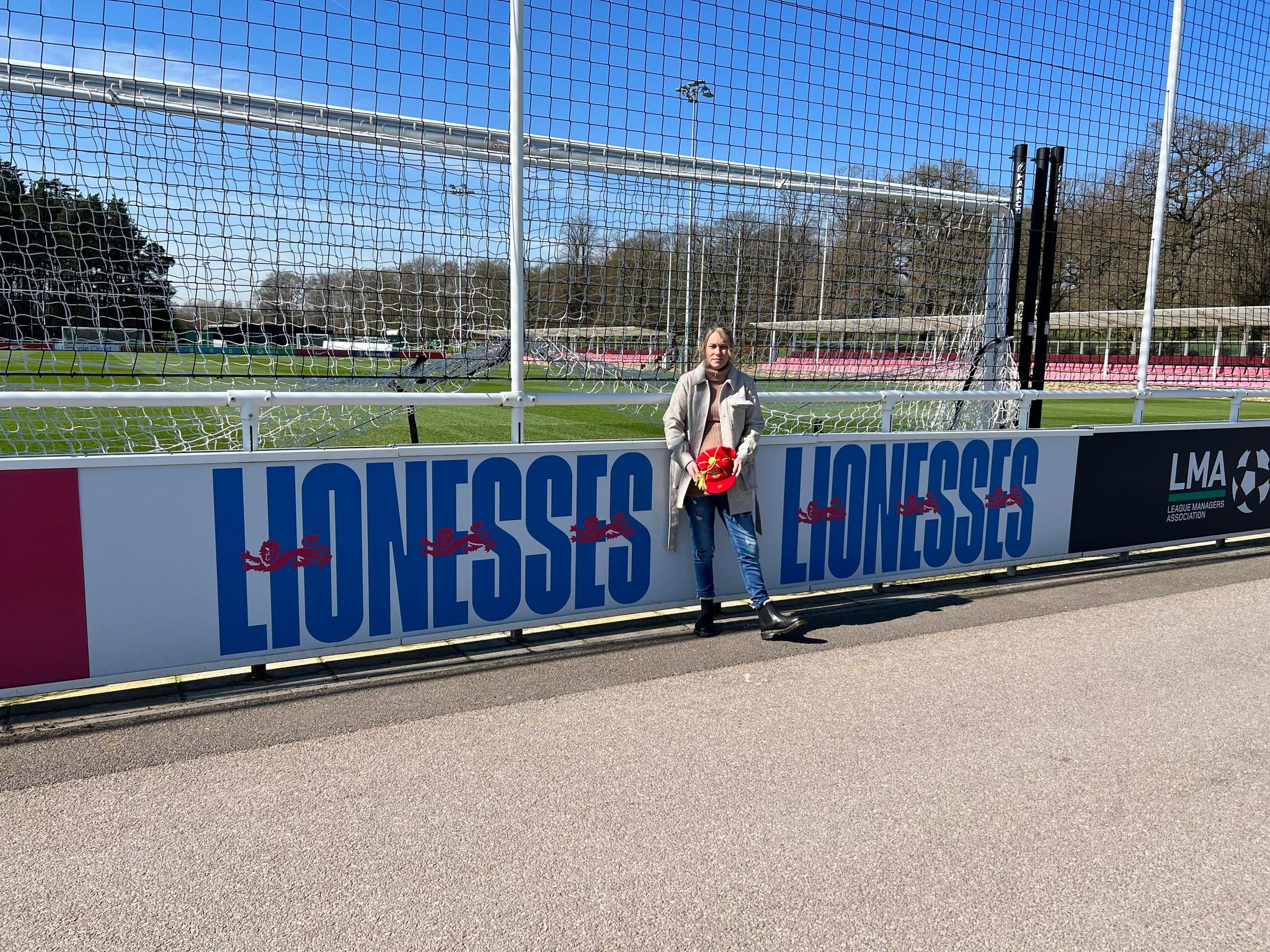
- Aran after receiving her England Legacy Cap at St George's Park in April 2023

Personal information
- Full name: Aran Helen Nevins Embleton
- Date of birth: 7 October 1981 (age 45)
- Place of birth: Dudley, Northumberland, England
- Positions: Midfielder; forward

Senior career*
Years	Team	Apps	(Gls)
1991–2000	Blyth Spartans Kestrels		
2000–2001	Doncaster Belles		
2001–2002	Sunderland Women		
2002–2003	Chester-le-Street Ladies		
2005–2006	Whitley Bay Ladies		
- Cramlington Juniors
2011–	North Shields Ladies		

International career^{‡}
1995–2002	England	4	(0)
- * Club domestic league appearances and goals ‡ National team caps and goals as of 09:50, 8 May 2011 (UTC)

Aran Embleton, also called "Azza" by her teammates (born 7 October 1981) is an English footballer. She signed for North Shields Ladies in February 2011., having previously played in midfield or attack for Sunderland Women and Doncaster Belles. She had many offers for scholarships in America but turned them all down to play for her home team.

Since 2024, Aran is the co-host of The Toon Review YouTube Channel alongside Lady Sam.

== Club career ==
After starting her career with Cowgate Kestrels now known as Sunderland, Embleton joined Doncaster Belles in 1999–00. That season she set up the winning goal in Doncaster's FA Women's Cup semi–final win over Arsenal, and also started the final defeat to Croydon. In October 2000 Embleton scored twice against her former club, as The Belles beat Sunderland 4–0.

In December 2001 Embleton returned to Sunderland, but moved on to Chester-le-Street Ladies a year later. After taking a break from football, Embleton joined newly–formed club Whitley Bay in 2005 and scored 46 goals in 2005–06, before reportedly being approached by Sunderland again in August 2006.

She transferred to North Shields Ladies in February 2011, having featured for Cramlington Juniors in the intervening period.

== International career ==
Aran Embleton played for England, her first national call up was at the age of 14 for a training week with the senior women at Bisham Abbey then went onto U–18s before being called into the senior squad for the annual La Manga Club training camp in January 2001. She made her debut as a substitute in a 4–2 friendly win over Spain at Kenilworth Road in March 2001.

Although not selected for UEFA Women's Euro 2001, Embleton remained in contention and played in the next friendly, a 3–0 loss to Denmark in Northampton. She made another appearance in a World Cup qualifier in Portugal in November 2001. She was called up to a 30-strong training party in La Manga in January 2002.

In April 2023, Aran received her England Legacy Cap at St George's Park after The FA had decided to introduce Legacy Caps in November 2022 to mark the 50th anniversary of an official England women's team. Her Legacy Cap number (#137) was presented to her by Alex Greenwood.

She was allotted 137 when the FA announced their legacy numbers scheme to honour the 50th anniversary of England's inaugural international.
