= Becky Easton =

English footballer

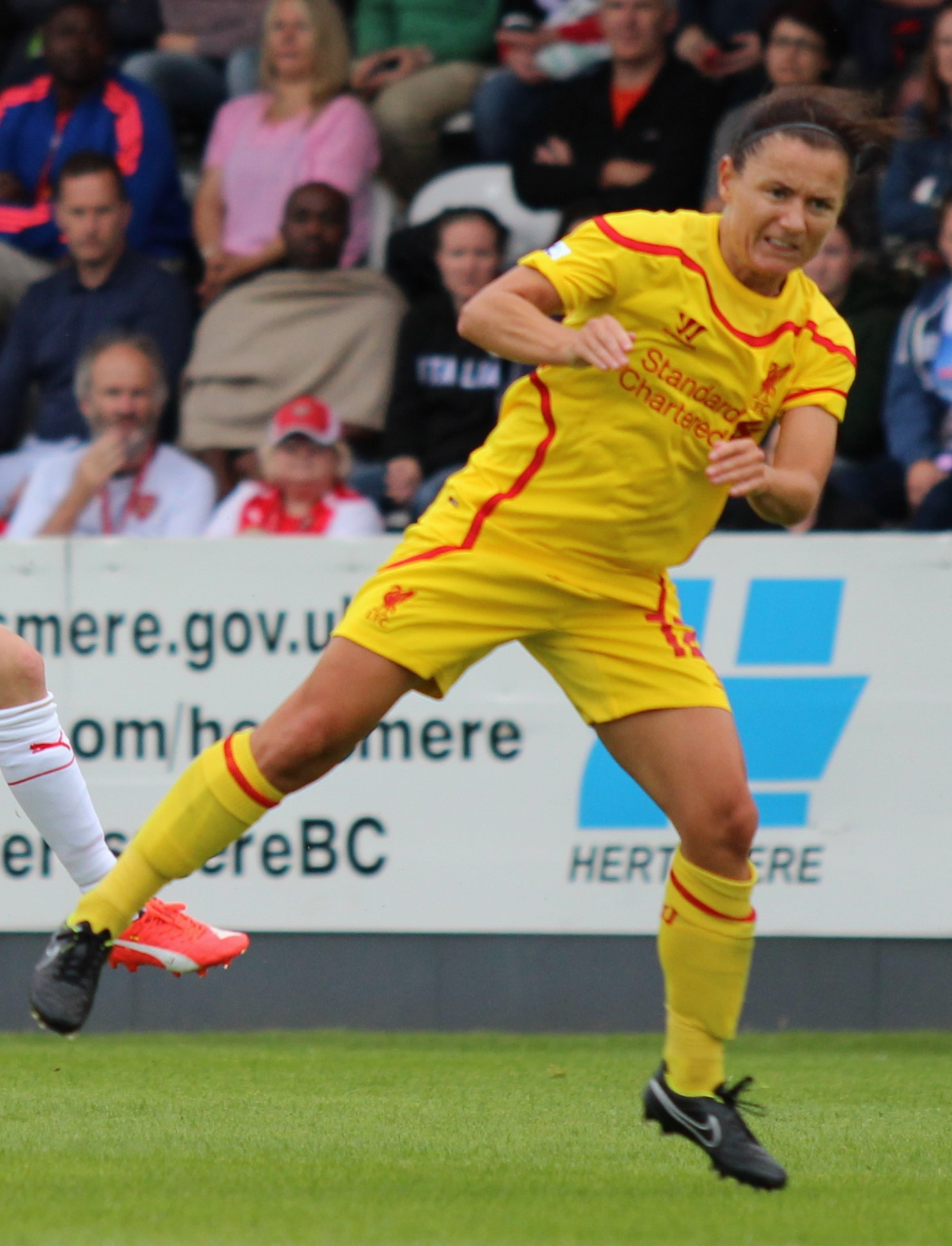
- Easton playing for Liverpool in 2015

Personal information
- Full name: Rebecca Anne Easton
- Date of birth: 16 April 1974 (age 52)
- Place of birth: Birkenhead, England
- Positions: Right-back; midfielder

Youth career
- 1988–1992: Rivacre Ladies

Senior career*
| Years | Team | Apps | (Gls) |
| 1992–1994 | Leasowe Pacific | | |
| 1994–1997 | Liverpool | | |
| 1997–2000 | Everton | | |
| 2000–2004 | Doncaster Rovers Belles | | |
| 2004–2012 | Everton | | |
| 2012–2015 | Liverpool | 31 | (1) |
| 2015–2016 | Doncaster Rovers Belles | 3 | (0) |

International career
| 1995–2001 | England | 44 | (0) |
- * Club domestic league appearances and goals

Rebecca Anne Easton (born 16 April 1974) is an English former footballer who played as a right-back and midfielder.

A native of Birkenhead, Easton has won league titles with both Everton and Liverpool. She played for England and was a member of the 1995 FIFA Women's World Cup and UEFA Women's Euro 2001 squads.

== Club career ==
Easton joined Everton from Liverpool in 1997, and won the league title in her first season with the Blues. She had featured in Liverpool's FA Women's Cup final defeats in 1995 and 1996.

Easton had a second spell with Everton having re-signed from Doncaster Rovers Belles in the 2004 close season, where she had been captain.

In 2012, Easton was released by Everton, but won a contract for the 2013 FA WSL season with Liverpool after a successful trial. With Easton in the team, Liverpool won the league title in 2013 and 2014, but were much less successful in 2015, finishing second bottom. Her 2015 campaign was truncated by a broken arm. Aged 41, she was among four players to be released by the club at the end of the season.

In December 2015, Easton rejoined Doncaster Rovers Belles, where she would combine playing with a role as assistant general manager. Doncaster lost their four opening games and were marooned at the foot of the WSL 1 table, when Easton left the club by "mutual consent" in the mid-season break, ostensibly to focus on her studies.

== International career ==
Easton represented England at senior level, playing in England's first ever FIFA Women's World Cup finals appearance in 1995, which ended with a 3–0 quarter-final defeat by Germany.

In 2000, she was named as the Nationwide International Player of the Year, based on her consistency for the national team.

She was given number 104 when the FA announced their legacy numbers scheme to honour the 50th anniversary of England's inaugural international.

== Personal life ==
Easton worked as a podiatrist in Liverpool, until she began full-time football training during her second spell with Liverpool Ladies. She also embarked on a master's degree in sports directorship at Manchester Metropolitan University.

Easton is the cousin of comedian Paul O'Grady. On 26 May 2016, she married former teammate Natasha Dowie.

== Honours ==
Everton

- FA Women's Premier League: 1997–98
- FA Women's Premier League Cup: 2007–08
- FA Women's Cup: 2009–10

Liverpool

- FA WSL: 2013, 2014
