= Vicky Exley =

English footballer

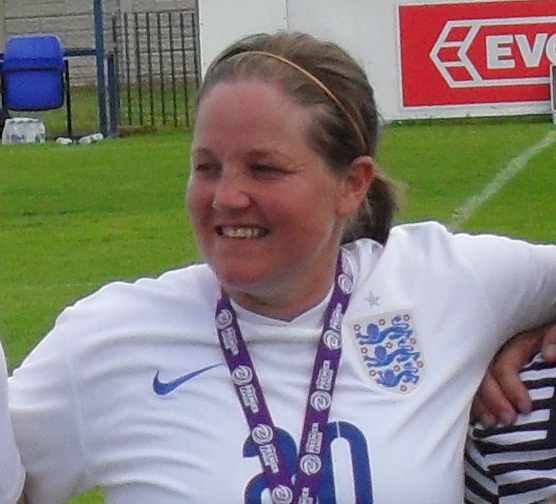

Personal information
- Full name: Vicky Exley
- Date of birth: 22 October 1975 (age 51)
- Place of birth: Rotherham, England
- Height: 1.63 m (5 ft 4 in)
- Position: Midfielder

Senior career*
Years	Team	Apps	(Gls)
1991–1994	Sheffield Wednesday		
1994–2012	Doncaster Rovers Belles		

International career^{‡}
1996–2007	England	52	(7)
- * Club domestic league appearances and goals as of 13:25, 13 October 2009 (UTC) ‡ National team caps and goals as of 13:25, 13 October 2009 (UTC)

Vicky Exley (born 22 October 1975) is an English former international footballer from Rotherham in South Yorkshire. She most recently played for Doncaster Rovers Belles in the FA WSL, the top division of women's football in England. Exley also played over 50 times for England's national team.

== Club career ==
Exley joined Sheffield Wednesday Ladies at the age of 15, moving to Doncaster Rovers Belles three years later. She began her Belles career as a striker before switching back to a midfield playmaker role. Nicknamed Tricky, Exley is renowned for her powerful shot.

Despite scoring with a header, Exley was on the losing side in the 2000 FA Women's Cup final, as Croydon won 2–1. Two years later Exley featured in another Cup final defeat, this time to professional Fulham.

In 2004 Doncaster Belles suffered an exodus of players after a financial crisis, however, Exley and Claire Utley chose to remain loyal to the club. In September 2004, Exley scored after four seconds of a League Cup tie against Aston Villa from inside her own half. During that 2004–05 season, Doncaster struggled and only retained their National Premier League status thanks to Exley scoring on the final day of the season. Exley was top scorer for Doncaster Belles in the following two seasons, winning the manager's Player of the Year award in 2006.

In July 2008, Exley scored the only goal of the game as Doncaster beat Watford Ladies in the FA Futsal Women's Cup, the competition being the first time that Doncaster had played Futsal.

Exley scored 25 goals in all competitions during 2009–10 and was named in the Belles' 2011 FA WSL squad. She netted Doncaster's first goal in the new league, the winner at Lincoln Ladies' Sincil Bank on the opening night.

Prior to the 2012 season Exley was released by Doncaster. In explaining his decision, manager John Buckley paid his own tribute, telling the Doncaster Free Press:

Vicky has been a great servant to the club. When she was younger there were times when she virtually carried the team on her shoulders. I just felt that she has reached a stage where her legs can't do what her brain wants her to do. It's probably one of the hardest decisions I'll ever have to make—and she'll probably hate me for it.

In May 2012 it was reported that Exley had decided to retire from football altogether. In June 2012 Exley served as a torch bearer in the 2012 Summer Olympics torch relay, as recognition for her services to playing and coaching football.

== International career ==
Following her March 1996 debut, a 2–1 defeat in Italy, Exley played a total of 52 times for England. In September 2004 Exley captained England for the first time, marking the occasion with a goal in a 2–1 friendly win over the Netherlands. She appeared in the 2007 World Cup, scoring a penalty in the final group-stage game against Argentina. Exley then announced her retirement from international football in November 2007, stating her desire to go into coaching.

She was given number 113 when the FA announced their legacy numbers scheme to honour the 50th anniversary of England’s inaugural international.

=== International goals ===
Scores and results list England's goal tally first.

#	Date	Venue	Opponent	Result	Competition	Scored
1	18 April 1996	Osijek	Croatia	2–0	1997 UEFA Women's Championship Qual.	1
2	7 March 2002	Paderne	Scotland	4–1	Algarve Cup	1
3	16 September 2004	Sportpark De Wending, Heerhugowaard	Netherlands	2–1	Friendly	1
5	9 March 2005	Paderne	Northern Ireland	4–0	Algarve Cup	2
6	11 May 2006	St. Mary's, Southampton	Hungary	2–0	2007 FIFA World Cup Qual.	1
7	17 September 2007	Chengdu Longquanyi Football Stadium, Chengdu	Argentina	6–1	2007 FIFA World Cup	1

== Personal life ==
Exley supports Sheffield Wednesday and works as a postwoman.

Sporting positions
Preceded by Becky Easton	Doncaster Rovers Belles captain 2004–2010	Succeeded by Katie Holtham
