= Mel Garside-Wight =

English footballer

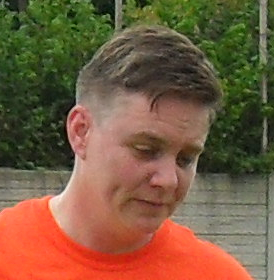

Personal information
- Full name: Melanie Garside-Wight
- Date of birth: 11 August 1979 (age 47)
- Place of birth: Halifax, England
- Positions: Striker; goalkeeper

Team information
- Current team: Bradford City

Senior career*
Years	Team	Apps	(Gls)
1991–1999	Bradford City		
1999–2002	Doncaster Belles		
2002–2003	Sheffield Wednesday		
2003–2004	Manchester City		
2004–2005	Stockport County		
2005–	Bradford City		

International career
1998	England	3	(0)
- * Club domestic league appearances and goals

Melanie "Mel" Garside-Wight (born 11 August 1979) is an English footballer, and former England women's national football team player. A forward or winger comfortable on either flank, Garside-Wight began her career with local club Bradford City and later joined Doncaster Belles. She was known as Melanie Garside until she married Gillian Wight in May 2010 and added her surname to her own.

== Club career ==
Garside-Wight came to prominence with Bradford City Women, playing in the FA Women's Premier League National Division and achieving England recognition. In November 1998 she suffered a broken leg in a freak accident while training in Peel Park.

In 1999–00, with City having been relegated in her absence, Garside-Wight joined Doncaster Belles. She scored the winner in that season's FA Women's Cup semi–final victory over Arsenal as Doncaster reached a record 12th final. She also started The Belles' controversial 2–1 defeat to Croydon in the final at Bramall Lane.

Two years later Garside-Wight was an unused substitute as Doncaster Belles lost another FA Women's Cup final, this time to Fulham at Selhurst Park. She transferred to Northern Division club Sheffield Wednesday that summer. In 2003–04 Garside-Wight was Manchester City's top goalscorer, before she joined Stockport County ahead of 2004–05.

Garside-Wight subsequently returned to Bradford City and became the club's captain and all–time record goalscorer. In 2010–11 she was converted to a goalkeeper.

== International career ==
As a teenager Garside-Wight played three times for England in 1997–98. Her debut came in February 1998, playing 90 minutes of a 3–2 friendly defeat to France in Alençon. The following month she appeared as a substitute for Mo Marley in a 1–0 World Cup qualifying loss to Germany at The New Den. Garside-Wight's third and final cap came in a 2–1 home friendly defeat to Italy in April 1998. She and fellow striker Joanne Broadhurst were substituted at half-time after failing to make an impact.

After Hope Powell was appointed England manager in July 1998, Garside-Wight remained on the fringes of the national team, until suffering serious injury later that year.

Garside-Wight was given number 129 when the FA announced their legacy numbers scheme to honour the 50th anniversary of England’s inaugural international.
