= Carmaine Walker =

English footballer

Personal information
- Date of birth: 5 November 1979 (age 46)
- Place of birth: South London, England
- Height: 5 ft 11 in (1.80 m)
- Position: Striker

Senior career*
Years	Team	Apps	(Gls)
1985–1995	Crystal Palace		
1996–1998	St Georges		
1998–2000	Croydon		
2000–2006	Charlton Athletic		
2008–2009	Millwall Lionesses		

International career
2003–2004	England	7	(0)
- * Club domestic league appearances and goals

Carmaine Walker (born 5 November 1979) is a former English footballer, who represented England women's national football team. A tall and powerful striker, Walker won the FA Women's Cup once and the Premier League twice with home town club Croydon. Now working as a driver for Initial Medical

== Club career ==
Walker began her football career with a decade at Crystal Palace. She moved to St Georges in 1996 and hit 63 goals in 84 games across all competitions.

After joining Croydon in 1998, Walker won the Premier League twice and the FA Women's Cup once, before Croydon came under the auspices of Charlton Athletic in 2000. Walker headed the opening goal in Croydon's 2–1 FA Women's Cup final win over Doncaster Belles in 2000. She remained with Charlton and played in successive FA Women's Cup final defeats in 2003 and 2004. A long-term injury had kept Walker out of action for most of the 2001–02 season.

In March 2004 Walker scored twice and missed a penalty as Charlton ended Fulham's two-year unbeaten league run. Charlton manager Keith Boanas said, "She used to have disciplinary problems, always late for training. But I've instilled belief in her that she could be an England player."

Walker made a brief comeback with Millwall Lionesses in August 2008, scoring a penalty in a 2–1 debut win over Ipswich Town.

== International career ==
Walker was first called up by the senior England team in January 2003, for the annual training camp at La Manga Club. Her first cap came the following month, replacing namesake Karen Walker during a 1–0 defeat to Italy in Viareggio.

In May 2003 Walker made two further appearances during England's ill-fated tour of North America, starting two 4–0 defeats to Canada after sitting out a 6–0 humbling by United States. She also featured in friendlies against Australia and Germany later that year.

In September 2003 an on-pitch altercation with Doncaster Belles' former Charlton Athletic player Carly Hunt saw a red card for Walker. Days later the incident spilled over into an England training session, resulting in lengthy bans for twins Carly and Gemma Hunt, as well as Walker and her Charlton teammate Eartha Pond.

Walker was recalled to the National squad after serving the suspension. Her sixth and final appearance for England came as a half time substitute for club mate Amanda Barr in a 1–0 friendly win over Iceland in May 2004.

She was allotted 148 when the FA announced their legacy numbers scheme to honour the 50th anniversary of England’s inaugural international.
