= 2007–08 Arsenal L.F.C. season =

English women's football club season

Arsenal Ladies
2007–08 season
- Chairman: Peter Hill-Wood
- Manager: Vic Akers
- Stadium: Meadow Park
- Premier League: Champions
- FA Cup: Winners
- Premier League Cup: Runners Up
- UEFA Cup: Quarter-finals
- London County Cup: Winners
- Top goalscorer: League: Lianne Sanderson (25); All: Lianne Sanderson (53)
- Biggest win: 11–1 (vs Newquay (A), Premier League Cup, 21 October 2007); 11–1 (vs Newquay (H), FA Cup, 6 January 2008)
- Biggest defeat: 2–3 (vs Lyon (H), UEFA Cup, 21 November 2007); 0–1 (vs Everton (N), Premier League Cup, 28 February 2008)
| Home colours | Away colours | Third colours |

The 2007–08 season was Arsenal Ladies Football Club's 21st season since forming in 1987. The club participated in the National Division of the FA Women's Premier League, winning the title for a 5th consecutive season and doing so unbeaten once again. They completed a domestic double by winning the FA Women's Cup by defeating Leeds Carnegie 4–1 in the Final, but lost the Premier League Cup Final to Everton. They were unable to defend their Community Shield title as the competition was suspended due to the 2007 FIFA Women's World Cup. They also competed in the UEFA Women's Cup as reigning champions, but lost at the quarter-final stage to Lyon.

== Squad information & statistics ==
=== First team squad ===
Squad statistics correct as of May 2008

| Squad No. | Name | Date of birth (age) | Since | Signed from |
Goalkeepers
| 1 | (Republic of Ireland) Emma Byrne | 14 June 1979 (aged 29) | 2000 | (Denmark) Fortuna Hjørring |
| 24 | (Jamaica) Becky Spencer | 22 February 1991 (aged 17) | 2005 | (England) Arsenal Academy |
| | (England) Sarah Quantrill | 21 July 1990 (aged 17) | 2007 | (England) Arsenal Academy |
Defenders
| 3 | (Republic of Ireland) Yvonne Tracy | 27 February 1981 (aged 27) | 2000 | (Republic of Ireland) St Patrick's Athletic |
| 5 | (England) Leanne Champ | 10 August 1983 (aged 24) | 2001 | (England) Millwall Lionesses |
| 6 | (England) Faye White (c) | 2 February 1978 (aged 30) | 1996 | (England) Three Bridges |
| 12 | (England) Alex Scott | 14 October 1984 (aged 23) | 2005 | (England) Birmingham City |
| 15 | (England) Gilly Flaherty | 24 August 1991 (aged 16) | 2006 | (England) Arsenal Academy |
| 18 | (England) Anita Asante | 27 April 1985 (aged 23) | 1998 | (England) Arsenal Academy |
| 19 | (Netherlands) Félicienne Minnaar | 31 January 1989 (aged 19) | 2006 | (England) Arsenal Academy |
| 23 | (England) Mary Phillip | 14 March 1977 (aged 31) | 2004 | (England) Fulham |
| 27 | (Republic of Ireland) Seana Cooke | 6 July 1989 (aged 18) | 2006 | (England) Arsenal Academy |
| | (England) Cally Rowell | 14 January 1991 (aged 17) | 2007 | (England) Arsenal Academy |
| | (England) Faye Marsh | | 2005 | (England) Arsenal Academy |
Midfielders
| 4 | (Wales) Jayne Ludlow | 7 January 1979 (aged 29) | 2000 | (England) Southampton Saints |
| 7 | (Republic of Ireland) Ciara Grant | 17 May 1978 (aged 30) | 1998 | (Republic of Ireland) St Patrick's Athletic |
| 8 | (England) Kelly Smith | 29 October 1978 (aged 29) | 2005 | (United States) New Jersey Wildcats |
| 16 | (Scotland) Kim Little | 26 September 1990 (aged 17) | 2008 | (Scotland) Hibernian |
| 17 | (England) Katie Chapman | 15 June 1982 (aged 26) | 2006 | (England) Charlton Athletic |
| 21 | (England) Elizabeth Wicks | 13 October 1989 (aged 18) | 2006 | (England) Arsenal Academy |
| 22 | (England) Laura Coombs | 29 January 1991 (aged 17) | 2007 | (England) Arsenal Academy |
| | (England) Lauren Walker | 12 March 1989 (aged 19) | 2006 | (England) Wolverhampton Wanderers |
| | (Belgium) Lenie Onzia | 30 May 1989 (aged 19) | 2007 | (Belgium) OH Leuven |
Forwards
| 9 | (England) Lianne Sanderson | 3 February 1988 (aged 20) | 2003 | (England) Arsenal Academy |
| 10 | (Scotland) Julie Fleeting | 18 December 1980 (aged 27) | 2004 | (Scotland) Ross County |
| 11 | (England) Rachel Yankey | 1 November 1979 (aged 28) | 2005 | (United States) New Jersey Wildcats |
| 14 | (England) Karen Carney | 1 August 1987 (aged 20) | 2006 | (England) Birmingham City |
| 20 | (England) Gemma Davison | 17 April 1987 (aged 21) | 2001 | (England) Watford |
| | (Wales) Sarah Wiltshire | 7 July 1991 (aged 16) | 2007 | (England) Arsenal Academy |

=== Appearances and goals ===
| No. | Name | PLND | | FA Cup | | PL Cup | | LC Cup | | UEFA Cup | | Total | |
| No. | Name | Apps | Goals | Apps | Goals | Apps | Goals | Apps | Goals | Apps | Goals | Apps | Goals |
Goalkeepers
| 1 | (Republic of Ireland) Emma Byrne | 21 | 0 | 4 | 0 | 5 | 0 | 1 | 0 | 5 | 0 | 36 | 0 |
| 24 | (Jamaica) Rebecca Spencer | 1+3 | 0 | 1 | 0 | 0 | 0 | 1 | 0 | 0 | 0 | 3+3 | 0 |
| | (England) Sarah Quantrill | 0 | 0 | 0 | 0 | 0 | 0 | 1 | 0 | 0 | 0 | 1 | 0 |
Defenders
| 3 | (Republic of Ireland) Yvonne Tracy | 11+5 | 1 | 0+1 | 0 | 3+1 | 1 | 2 | 1 | 0+1 | 0 | 16+8 | 3 |
| 5 | (England) Leanne Champ | 0+1 | 0 | 0 | 0 | 0 | 0 | 0 | 0 | 0 | 0 | 0+1 | 0 |
| 6 | (England) Faye White (c) | 16 | 5 | 5 | 0 | 2+1 | 0 | 0+1 | 0 | 2 | 0 | 25+2 | 5 |
| 12 | (England) Alex Scott | 20+1 | 1 | 5 | 1 | 4 | 0 | 2 | 1 | 5 | 0 | 36+1 | 3 |
| 15 | (England) Gilly Flaherty | 3+3 | 0 | 1+2 | 0 | 3+1 | 0 | 2 | 0 | 0+2 | 0 | 9+7 | 0 |
| 18 | (England) Anita Asante | 21 | 0 | 4 | 0 | 5 | 0 | 3 | 0 | 5 | 0 | 38 | 0 |
| 19 | (Netherlands) Félicienne Minnaar | 0 | 0 | 0 | 0 | 0 | 0 | 0 | 0 | 0 | 0 | 0 | 0 |
| 23 | (England) Mary Phillip | 17+1 | 0 | 5 | 2 | 2+1 | 0 | 2 | 0 | 5 | 0 | 31+2 | 2 |
| 27 | (Republic of Ireland) Seana Cooke | 0+1 | 0 | 0 | 0 | 0 | 0 | 2 | 1 | 0 | 0 | 2+1 | 1 |
| | (England) Cally Rowell | 0 | 0 | 0 | 0 | 0 | 0 | 0+1 | 0 | 0 | 0 | 0+1 | 0 |
| | (England) Faye Marsh | 0 | 0 | 0 | 0 | 0+1 | 1 | 0 | 0 | 0 | 0 | 0+1 | 1 |
Midfielders
| 4 | (Wales) Jayne Ludlow | 19+3 | 9 | 5 | 4 | 5 | 4 | 0+1 | 1 | 5 | 2 | 34+4 | 20 |
| 7 | (Republic of Ireland) Ciara Grant | 15+2 | 1 | 3+1 | 2 | 3+1 | 0 | 1+1 | 0 | 3 | 1 | 25+5 | 4 |
| 8 | (England) Kelly Smith | 15+1 | 8 | 4+1 | 5 | 3 | 0 | 0+1 | 0 | 4 | 2 | 26+3 | 15 |
| 16 | (Scotland) Kim Little | 8 | 1 | 0 | 0 | 0 | 0 | 0 | 0 | 0 | 0 | 8 | 1 |
| 17 | (England) Katie Chapman | 7 | 6 | 0 | 0 | 3 | 1 | 0 | 0 | 5 | 2 | 15 | 9 |
| 21 | (England) Elizabeth Wicks | 0 | 0 | 0 | 0 | 0+2 | 1 | 3 | 3 | 0 | 0 | 3+2 | 4 |
| 22 | (England) Laura Coombs | 0+1 | 0 | 0 | 0 | 0 | 0 | 2 | 1 | 0 | 0 | 2+1 | 1 |
| | (England) Lauren Walker | 0 | 0 | 0 | 0 | 0 | 0 | 0 | 0 | 0 | 0 | 0 | 0 |
| | (Belgium) Lenie Onzia | 0 | 0 | 0 | 0 | 0 | 0 | 1 | 0 | 0 | 0 | 1 | 0 |
Forwards
| 9 | (England) Lianne Sanderson | 20 | 25 | 5 | 11 | 5 | 7 | 3 | 8 | 4+1 | 2 | 37+1 | 53 |
| 10 | (Scotland) Julie Fleeting | 9 | 11 | 1+1 | 1 | 1 | 0 | 0 | 0 | 4+1 | 3 | 15+2 | 15 |
| 11 | (England) Rachel Yankey | 15+4 | 4 | 4+1 | 2 | 5 | 5 | 1+1 | 0 | 5 | 1 | 30+6 | 12 |
| 14 | (England) Karen Carney | 20 | 10 | 5 | 2 | 5 | 2 | 1 | 0 | 3+2 | 3 | 33+2 | 17 |
| 20 | (England) Gemma Davison | 4+14 | 1 | 2+3 | 2 | 1+4 | 0 | 3 | 1 | 0+2 | 0 | 10+23 | 4 |
| | (Wales) Sarah Wiltshire | 0 | 0 | 0 | 0 | 0 | 0 | 2+1 | 0 | 0 | 0 | 2+1 | 0 |

=== Goalscorers ===
| Rank | No. | Position | Name | PLND | FA Cup | PL Cup | LC Cup | UEFA Cup | Total |
|---|---|---|---|---|---|---|---|---|---|
| 1 | 9 | FW | (England) Lianne Sanderson | 25 | 11 | 7 | 8 | 2 | 53 |
| 2 | 4 | MF | (Wales) Jayne Ludlow | 9 | 4 | 4 | 1 | 2 | 20 |
| 3 | 14 | FW | (England) Karen Carney | 10 | 2 | 2 | 0 | 3 | 17 |
| 4 | 8 | MF | (England) Kelly Smith | 8 | 5 | 0 | 0 | 2 | 15 |
| 4 | 10 | FW | (Scotland) Julie Fleeting | 11 | 1 | 0 | 0 | 3 | 15 |
| 6 | 11 | FW | (England) Rachel Yankey | 4 | 2 | 5 | 0 | 1 | 12 |
| 7 | 17 | MF | (England) Katie Chapman | 6 | 0 | 1 | 0 | 2 | 9 |
| 8 | 6 | DF | (England) Faye White | 5 | 0 | 0 | 0 | 0 | 5 |
| 9 | 7 | MF | (Republic of Ireland) Ciara Grant | 1 | 2 | 0 | 0 | 1 | 4 |
| 9 | 20 | FW | (England) Gemma Davison | 1 | 2 | 0 | 1 | 0 | 4 |
| 9 | 21 | MF | (England) Elizabeth Wicks | 0 | 0 | 1 | 3 | 0 | 4 |
| 12 | 3 | DF | (Republic of Ireland) Yvonne Tracy | 1 | 0 | 1 | 1 | 0 | 3 |
| 12 | 12 | DF | (England) Alex Scott | 1 | 1 | 0 | 1 | 0 | 3 |
| 14 | 23 | DF | (England) Mary Phillip | 0 | 2 | 0 | 0 | 0 | 2 |
| 15 | 16 | MF | (Scotland) Kim Little | 1 | 0 | 0 | 0 | 0 | 1 |
| 15 | 22 | MF | (England) Laura Coombs | 0 | 0 | 0 | 1 | 0 | 1 |
| 15 | 27 | DF | (Republic of Ireland) Seana Cooke | 0 | 0 | 0 | 1 | 0 | 1 |
| 15 | | DF | (England) Faye Marsh | 0 | 0 | 1 | 0 | 0 | 1 |
| Total | | | | 83 | 32 | 22 | 17 | 16 | 170 |

=== Clean sheets ===
| Rank | No. | Name | PLND | FA Cup | PL Cup | LC Cup | UEFA Cup | Total |
|---|---|---|---|---|---|---|---|---|
| 1 | 1 | (Republic of Ireland) Emma Byrne | 11 | 0 | 2 | 0 | 3 | 16 |
| 2 | 13 | (Jamaica) Becky Spencer | 1 | 0 | 0 | 0 | 0 | 1 |
| 2 | | (England) Sarah Quantrill | 0 | 0 | 0 | 1 | 0 | 1 |
| Total | | | 12 | 0 | 2 | 1 | 3 | 18 |

== Transfers, loans and other signings ==
=== Transfers in ===
| Announcement date | No. | Position | Player | From club |
|---|---|---|---|---|
| 2007 | | MF | (Belgium) Lenie Onzia | (Belgium) OH Leuven |
| 2 March 2008 | 16 | MF | (Scotland) Kim Little | (Scotland) Hibernian |

=== Transfers out ===
| Announcement date | No. | Position | Player | To club |
|---|---|---|---|---|
| 6 July 2007 | 22 | MF | (England) Danielle Buet | (England) Chelsea |
| 6 July 2007 | 16 | MF | (England) Sian Larkin | (England) Chelsea |
| July 2007 | | MF | (England) Danielle Saulter | (England) Coventry United |
| July 2007 | 2 | DF | (England) Megan McKeag | (England) Chelsea |
| July 2007 | | MF | (Netherlands) Renée Slegers | (Netherlands) Willem II |
| July 2007 | 19 | MF | (England) Charlotte Gurr | (England) Chelsea |
| July 2007 | 15 | DF | (England) Cori Daniels | (England) Watford |
| 2007 | | MF | (Japan) Yuko Tukahashi | |
| 2007 | | MF | Beth Lloyd | |
| 2007 | | | Faye Marsh | |
| January 2008 | 5 | DF | (England) Leanne Champ | (England) Millwall Lionesses |
| January 2008 | 21 | MF | (England) Elizabeth Wicks | (England) Columbia Lions |

=== Loans out ===
| Announcement date | No. | Position | Player | To club |
|---|---|---|---|---|
| 16 June 2007 | 6 | DF | (England) Faye White | (Canada) Ottowa Fury |

== Club ==
=== Kit ===
Supplier: Nike / Sponsor: Fly Emirates

| Home | Away | Third | Fourth |

== Pre-season ==
| 8 August 2007 | Sheffield | 0–12 | Arsenal | Bright Finance Stadium |
| 19:00 BST | | Report | Carney; Ludlow; Smith; Sanderson; Scott; White |

== Competitions ==
=== Overall record ===
| Competition | First match | Last match | Starting round | Final position | Record | | | | | | | |
| Competition | First match | Last match | Starting round | Final position | Pld | W | D | L | GF | GA | GD | Win % |
|---|---|---|---|---|---|---|---|---|---|---|---|---|
| FA Women's Premier League National Division | 27 September 2007 | 14 May 2008 | Matchday 1 | Winners | 18 | 16 | 2 | 0 | 85 | 15 | +70 | 88.89 |
| FA Women's Cup | 6 January 2008 | 5 May 2008 | Fourth round | Winners | 5 | 5 | 0 | 0 | 33 | 5 | +28 | 100.00 |
| FA Women's Premier League Cup | 7 October 2007 | 28 February 2008 | First round | Runners-up | 4 | 4 | 0 | 0 | 22 | 3 | +19 | 100.00 |
| UEFA Women's Cup | 11 October 2007 | 21 November 2007 | Second qualifying round | Quarter-finals | 5 | 2 | 2 | 1 | 16 | 6 | +10 | 40.00 |
| London County Cup | 17 February 2008 | 16 April 2008 | Quarter-finals | Winners | 3 | 3 | 0 | 0 | 17 | 3 | +14 | 100.00 |
| Total | | | | | 35 | 30 | 4 | 1 | 173 | 32 | +141 | 85.71 |

Last updated: 24 May 2026
Source: FA WPL

=== FA Women's Premier League National Division ===
==== Partial league table ====
| Pos | Team | Pld | W | D | L | GF | GA | GD | Pts | Qualification or relegation |
|---|---|---|---|---|---|---|---|---|---|---|
| 1 | Arsenal (C) | 22 | 20 | 2 | 0 | 85 | 15 | +70 | 62 | Qualification for the UEFA Cup qualifying round |
| 2 | Everton | 22 | 18 | 3 | 1 | 69 | 14 | +55 | 57 | |
| 3 | Leeds United (Note: On 9 July 2008, the team announced they were changing their name to Leeds Carnegie Ladies F.C. This came to ensure all of the professional sports teams Leeds Met University were investing in carried the name of the university's sport department, Carnegie College (including Leeds Carnegie and Yorkshire Carnegie). On 8 July 2010 it was announced by Leeds United F.C. that to stop Leeds Carnegie Ladies from going out of existence the club would step in to provide funding again, bringing the club full circle back to Leeds United Ladies once more, a day under two years since the club was renamed Leeds Carnegie L.F.C.) | 22 | 12 | 4 | 6 | 45 | 33 | +12 | 40 | |
| 4 | Bristol Academy | 22 | 10 | 4 | 8 | 45 | 35 | +10 | 34 | |
| 5 | Chelsea | 22 | 9 | 5 | 8 | 40 | 35 | +5 | 32 | |

Source: FA WPL
(C) Champions

==== Results summary ====
| Overall | | | | | | | | Home | | | | | | Away | | | | | |
| Pld | W | D | L | GF | GA | GD | Pts | W | D | L | GF | GA | GD | W | D | L | GF | GA | GD |
|---|---|---|---|---|---|---|---|---|---|---|---|---|---|---|---|---|---|---|---|
| 22 | 20 | 2 | 0 | 85 | 15 | +70 | 62 | 9 | 2 | 0 | 42 | 9 | +33 | 11 | 0 | 0 | 43 | 6 | +37 |

==== Results by matchday ====
| Matchday | 1 | 2 | 3 | 4 | 5 | 6 | 7 | 8 | 9 | 10 | 11 | 12 | 13 | 14 | 15 | 16 | 17 | 18 | 19 | 20 | 21 | 22 |
|---|---|---|---|---|---|---|---|---|---|---|---|---|---|---|---|---|---|---|---|---|---|---|
| Ground | A | A | A | H | H | A | A | A | H | A | H | H | A | A | A | H | A | H | H | H | H | H |
| Result | W | W | W | W | W | W | W | W | W | W | W | W | W | W | W | W | W | D | W | W | W | D |
| Position | 5 | 5 | 4 | 4 | 4 | 3 | 3 | 2 | 3 | 1 | 1 | 1 | 1 | 1 | 1 | 1 | 1 | 1 | 1 | 1 | 1 | 1 |

Source: FA WPL
W = Win; D = Draw; L = Loss

==== Matches ====
| 27 September 2007 1 | Watford | 2–6 | Arsenal | Letchworth |
| 19:30 BST | Lander 15', 43' | Report | Sanderson 6', 29', 60'; Chapman 20'; Carney 54'; Smith 64' (pen.) | Stadium: County Ground |

| 30 September 2007 2 | Liverpool | 1–4 | Arsenal | Skelmersdale |
| 14:00 BST | Jones 76' | Report | Ludlow 36'; Sanderson 47', 58'; Carney 90' | Stadium: Ashley Travel Stadium |

| 4 October 2007 3 | Chelsea | 0–3 | Arsenal | East Molesey |
| 19:30 BST | | Report | Fleeting 40', 54', 82' | Stadium: Imber Court |

| 8 November 2007 4 | Arsenal | 5–0 | Charlton Athletic | Borehamwood |
| 19:00 GMT | Sanderson 47', 65'; F. White 56'; Yankey 78'; Ludlow 82' | Report | | Stadium: Meadow Park; Referee: T Brooks |

| 11 November 2007 5 | Arsenal | 9–0 | Cardiff City | Borehamwood |
| 14:00 GMT | Sanderson 12', 17', 59'; A. Scott 19'; Chapman 20'; Ludlow 33'; F. White 43', 78'; Davison 71' | Report | | Stadium: Meadow Park |

| 29 November 2007 6 | Charlton Athletic | 0–7 | Arsenal | Dartford |
| 19:45 GMT | | Report | Ludlow 20'; Sanderson 25', 74'; Chapman 29', 83', 88'; Grant 60' | Stadium: Princes Park; Referee: Kirk English |

| 2 December 2007 7 | Everton | 0–2 | Arsenal | Crosby |
| 14:00 GMT | | Report | Sanderson 59'; Chapman 78' | Stadium: Rossett Park |

| 13 December 2007 8 | Bristol Academy | 0–1 | Arsenal | Almondsbury |
| 19:30 GMT | | Report | Carney 82' | Stadium: Oaklands Park |

| 24 January 2008 9 | Arsenal | 4–1 | Watford | Borehamwood |
| 19:45 GMT | Smith 37', 73'; Fleeting 49', 69' | Report | Howell 72' | Stadium: Meadow Park |
Note: Match was originally played on 1 November 2007, but was abandoned at half time with the score goalless.

| 3 February 2008 10 | Blackburn Rovers | 1–3 | Arsenal | Clitheroe |
| 14:00 GMT | Anderton 79' | Report | F. White 50'; Fleeting 58'; Smith 81' (pen.) | Stadium: Shawbride |

| 10 February 2008 11 | Arsenal | 5–2 | Liverpool | Borehamwood |
| 14:00 GMT | Sanderson 5', 37'; Yankey 46'; Fleeting 77', 88' | Report | Parry 6'; McCoy 78' | Stadium: Meadow Park |

| 21 February 2008 12 | Arsenal | 4–3 | Doncaster Rovers Belles | Borehamwood |
| 19:45 GMT | Carney 2'; Grant 35'; Fleeting 49', 68' | Report | Heckler 56', 65'; Exley 61' | Stadium: Meadow Park |

| 2 March 2008 13 | Leeds United | 0–4 | Arsenal | Tadcaster |
| 14:00 GMT | | Report | Yankey 3'; Sanderson 34', 40'; Fleeting 89' | Stadium: Ings Lane |

| 23 March 2008 14 | Cardiff City | 0–6 | Arsenal | Bridgend |
| 14:00 GMT | | Report | Carney 15', 18'; Smith 24'; Sanderson 28', 33'; Ludlow 51' | Stadium: Bryntirion Park |

| 26 March 2008 15 | Doncaster Rovers Belles | 2–4 | Arsenal | Doncaster |
| 19:45 GMT | Hansen 4'; Hamilton 64' | Report | Tracy 2'; Sanderson 34', 50'; Ludlow 67' | Stadium: Keepmoat Stadium |

| 30 March 2008 16 | Arsenal | 3–0 | Birmingham City | Borehamwood |
| 14:00 GMT | Ludlow 10'; Sanderson 82', 89' | Report | | Stadium: Meadow Park |

| 3 April 2008 17 | Birmingham City | 0–3 | Arsenal | Redditch |
| 19:45 BST | | Report | Sanderson 17'; Smith 31'; Carney 37' | Stadium: Valley Stadium |

| 13 April 2008 18 | Arsenal | 0–0 | Everton | Borehamwood |
| 14:00 BST | | Report | | Stadium: Meadow Park |

| 20 April 2008 19 | Arsenal | 2–0 | Bristol Academy | Borehamwood |
| 14:00 BST | Smith 44' (pen.); Yankey 75' | Report | | Stadium: Meadow Park |

| 24 April 2008 20 | Arsenal | 4–1 | Chelsea | Holloway, London |
| 19:00 BST | Carney 21', 83'; Sanderson (penalty missed); Smith 32' (pen.); Little 77' | Report | Whitter 15' | Stadium: Emirates Stadium; Attendance: 5,285 |

| 27 April 2008 21 | Arsenal | 5–1 | Blackburn Rovers | Borehamwood |
| 14:00 BST | Ludlow 13', 31'; F. White 30'; Brewer 32' (o.g.); Sanderson 71' | Report | Campbell 60' | Stadium: Meadow Park |

| 14 May 2008 22 | Arsenal | 1–1 | Leeds United | London Colney |
| 17:30 BST | Carney 21' | Report | Moore 50' | Stadium: Arsenal Training Centre |

=== FA Women's Cup ===
| 6 January 2008 Fourth round | Arsenal | 11–1 | Newquay | Borehamwood |
| 14:00 BST | Sanderson; Ludlow; Grant; Davison; Grant; Yankey; Phillip (pen.) | Report | Wood (pen.) | Stadium: Meadow Park |

| 27 January 2008 Fifth round | Arsenal | 8–1 | West Ham United | Borehamwood |
| 14:00 BST | Sanderson 2', 53' (pen.); Davison 22'; Smith 35'; Phillip 40'; Yankey 41'; Carney 71'; 76' (o.g.) | Report | Puttick | Stadium: Meadow Park; Attendance: 325 |

| 24 February 2008 Quarter-finals | Arsenal | 5–1 | Birmingham City | Borehamwood |
| 14:00 BST | Fleeting 33'; Sanderson 37', 65'; A. Scott 60'; Carney 75' | Report | Hall 20' | Stadium: Meadow Park; Attendance: 230 |

| 16 March 2008 Semi-finals | Lincoln City | 1–5 | Arsenal | Lincoln |
| 15:00 BST | Barker 33' | Report | Smith 8', 26'; Sanderson 14', 21'; Ludlow 80' | Stadium: Sincil Bank; Attendance: 2,974; Referee: Amy Rayner |

| 5 May 2008 Final | Arsenal | 4–1 | Leeds United | Nottingham |
| 13:00 BST | Smith 54', 83'; Ludlow 59'; Sanderson 60' | Report | Clarke 69'; Culvin (yellow card) | Stadium: City Ground; Attendance: 24,582; Referee: Saša Ihringová |

=== FA Women's Premier League Cup ===
| 7 October 2007 First round | Cardiff City | 0–4 | Arsenal | Cwmbran |
| 14:00 GMT | | Report | Carney; Chapman; Yankey; Sanderson | Stadium: Cwmbran Stadium |

| 21 October 2007 Second round | Newquay | 1–11 | Arsenal | Truro |
| 14:00 BST | Wood (pen.) | Report | Yankey; Ludlow; Sanderson; Marsh; Wicks | Stadium: Truro City Stadium; Attendance: 1,200 |

| 4 November 2007 Quarter-finals | Arsenal | 3–1 | Chelsea | Borehamwood |
| 14:00 GMT | Carney 43'; Ludlow 78'; Sanderson 84' | Report | F. White 62' (o.g.) | Stadium: Meadow Park |

| 16 December 2007 Semi-finals | Arsenal | 4–0 | Liverpool | Borehamwood |
| 14:00 GMT | Ludlow 8'; Sanderson 42'; Yankey 68'; Tracy 84' | Report | | Stadium: Meadow Park |

| 28 February 2008 Final | Everton | 1–0 | Arsenal | Leyton |
| 14:00 GMT | Kane 7' (yellow card) 17'; J. Scott (yellow card) 73' | Report | A. Scott (yellow card) 42' | Stadium: Matchroom Stadium; Attendance: 5,008; Referee: Matt McLaughlin |

=== London County Cup ===
| 17 February 2008 Quarter Final | West Ham United | 2–11 | Arsenal | Harlow |
| 14:00 BST | Goal | Report | Sanderson; Wicks; A. Scott; Coombs; Davison | Stadium: Barrows Farm Stadium |

| 9 March 2008 Semi Final | Arsenal | 3–0 | Charlton Athletic | Borehamwood |
| 14:00 GMT | Sanderson 20', 27'; Cooke 37' | Report | | Stadium: Meadow Park; Referee: D Sotimirin |

| 16 April 2008 Final | Millwall Lionesses | 1–3 | Arsenal | Finchley |
| 19:30 BST | Mason | Report | Tracy; Sanderson; Ludlow | Stadium: Harry Abrahams Stadium |

=== UEFA Women's Cup ===
==== Second qualifying round ====
| Pos | Team | Pld | W | D | L | GF | GA | GD | Pts | Qualification | ARS | BAR | NEU | ALM |
|---|---|---|---|---|---|---|---|---|---|---|---|---|---|---|
| 1 | (England) Arsenal (H) | 3 | 2 | 1 | 0 | 14 | 3 | +11 | 7 | Advance to quarter-finals | — | – | 7–0 | 4–0 |
| 2 | (Italy) Bardolino | 3 | 2 | 1 | 0 | 11 | 6 | +5 | 7 | Advance to quarter-finals | 3–3 | — | 3–2 | – |
| 3 | (Austria) Neulengbach | 3 | 1 | 0 | 2 | 5 | 10 | −5 | 3 | | – | – | — | 3–0 |
| 4 | (Kazakhstan) Alma | 3 | 0 | 0 | 3 | 1 | 12 | −11 | 0 | | – | 1–5 | – | — |

Source: RSSSFGroup B1
(H) Hosts

| 11 October 2007 1 | Arsenal (England) | 4–0 | (Kazakhstan) Alma | Borehamwood |
| 18:30 BST | Carney 21', 25'; Chapman 32'; Sanderson 45' | Report | Chshuzenko (yellow card) 24'; Krasyukova (yellow card) 77' | Stadium: Meadow Park |

| 13 October 2007 2 | Arsenal (England) | 7–0 | (Austria) Neulengbach | Borehamwood |
| 10:45 GMT | Ludlow 9', 31'; Fleeting 28', 36'; Carney 33'; Chapman 71'; Grant 79' | Report | | Stadium: Meadow Park; Attendance: 334; Referee: Ausra Tvarijonaite (Lithuania) |

| 16 October 2007 3 | Bardolino (Italy) | 3–3 | (England) Arsenal | Borehamwood |
| 18:00 BST | Gabbiadini (yellow card) 17' (goal) 49'; Manieri 59'; Panico 90+2' | Report | Fleeting 27'; Sanderson 48'; Smith 85' | Stadium: Meadow Park |

==== Knockout phase ====
===== Quarter-finals =====
| 14 November 2007 First leg | Lyon (France) | 0–0 | (England) Arsenal | Lyon |
| 19:00 GMT | Renard (yellow card) 54'; Bompastor (yellow card) 68'; Georges (yellow card) 69' | Report | Carney (yellow card) 55'; Smith (yellow card) 80' | Stadium: Stade de Gerland; Attendance: 5,000; Referee: Bibiana Steinhaus (Germany) |

| 21 November 2007 Second leg | Arsenal (England) | 2–3 (2–3 agg.) | (France) Lyon | Borehamwood |
| 19:30 GMT | Smith 24' (yellow card) 81'; Yankey 33'; Ludlow (yellow card) 69' | Report | Kátia 16'; Abily 38' (yellow card) 61'; Bompastor (yellow card) 70'; Thomis 85'; Simone (yellow card) 89' | Stadium: Meadow Park; Referee: Jenny Palmqvist (Sweden) |

== See also ==
- List of Arsenal W.F.C. seasons
- 2007–08 in English football
