= 1989–90 Arsenal L.F.C. season =

English women's football club season

Arsenal Ladies
1989–90 season
- Chairman: Peter Hill-Wood
- Manager: Vic Akers
- Stadium: Douglas Eyre Sports Centre
- Division One: Fourth Place
- FA Cup: Quarter Final
- League Cup: Unknown
- Biggest win: 7–0 (vs Scarborough, (A), FA Cup)
- Biggest defeat: 0–8 (vs Red Star Southampton, (A), Home Counties League); 0–8 (vs Millwall Lionesses, (A), Home Counties League)
Home colours	Away colours

The 1989–90 season was Arsenal Ladies Football Club's 3rd season since forming in 1987. The club participated in the Home Counties Division One, finishing in third place, with Millwall Lionesses winning the League Title.

Arsenal also played in the FA Cup, reaching the Quarter Finals, defeating Watford 4–0 en route, before being knocked out by Friends of Fulham in the Quarter Finals.

The collapse of Islington Ladies saw a mass influx of players at Arsenal Ladies, leading to the creation of a Third Team, in addition to the First Team and Reserve Team. The Reserve side played in Division Two of the Greater London Women's League, whilst Third Team played in Division Four.

== Squad information & statistics ==
=== First team squad ===
Name	Date of birth (age)	Since	Signed from
Goalkeepers
(England) Nancy Jeffery	18 February 1978 (aged 12)	1989	(England) Limehouse
Jackie Eimermann	1966 (aged 24)	1989	(England) Islington
Jayne Hammond	1974 (aged 16)	1988	
Sue Street		1988	(England) Millwall Lionesses
Shirley Reynolds		1989	
Defenders
(England) Kirsty Pealling	14 April 1975 (aged 15)	1987	(England) Arsenal Academy
(England) Michelle Curley	30 April 1972 (aged 18)	1987	(England) Arsenal Academy
(England) Gill Bordman	26 October 1956 (aged 33)	1987	(England) Aylesbury
(England) Paula Birri	2 May 1971 (aged 19)	1988	(England) Arsenal Academy
(England) Kellie Battams	17 January 1977 (aged 12)	1989	(England) Arsenal Academy
(England) Amy Lamont	5 May 1974 (aged 18)	1989	(England) Arsenal Academy
(England) Lisa Spry	15 January 1968 (aged 22)	1989	(England) Islington
(Republic of Ireland) Janet Clarke	19 March 1973 (aged 17)	1989	(England) Arsenal Academy
(England) Columbine Saunders	9 November 1969 (aged 20)	1989	(England) Islington
(England) Alicia O'Grady	1962 (aged 27)	1987	(England) Aylesbury
(England) Angela Coneron	1959 (aged 31)	1987	(England) Aylesbury
(Republic of Ireland) Eileen Ahearne	1971 (aged 19)	1988	(England) Tottenham
(England) Annie Deegan	1972 (aged 18)	1988	(England) Arsenal Academy
Dee Meade	1957 (aged 33)	1987	(England) Friends of Fulham
Sarah Ritchie	1968 (aged 21)	1988	(England) Arsenal Academy
Johanna Galligan	1972 (aged 18)	1988	
Hazel Braund		1988	(England) Millwall Lionesses
Caroline Munns		1989	(England) Islington
(England) Janette Smith		1987	(England) Arsenal Academy
Mandy Eva		1989	
(Sweden) Camilla Kristiansson		1989	
Midfielders
(England) Marlene Egan	7 March 1964 (aged 26)	1989	(England) Islington
(England) Wendy Ward	26 June 1958 (aged 32)	1987	(England) Aylesbury
(England) Sharon Barber	27 May 1969 (aged 21)	1988	(England) Tottenham
(England) Michelle Lee	1974 (aged 16)	1988	(England) Arsenal Academy
Lynn Jones	1972 (aged 18)	1988	(England) Bolton
Michelle Kilner		1989	(England) Islington
(Scotland) Jennifer Strange		1989	(England) Islington
Forwards
(Wales) Naz Ball	28 February 1961 (aged 29)	1987	(England) Aylesbury
(Scotland) Michelle Sneddon	18 January 1974 (aged 16)	1989	(Scotland) Coltness
(England) Sarah Mulligan	22 July 1972 (aged 17)	1988	(England) Stevenage
(England) Caroline McGloin	25 April 1960 (aged 30)	1987	(England) Aylesbury
(England) Alice Fairbank	2 November 1972 (aged 17)	1989	(England) Hull City
(England) Kelly Townshend	12 May 1977 (aged 13)	1988	(England) Arsenal Academy
(England) Sarah Ryan	1 July 1972 (aged 17)	1987	(England) Arsenal Academy
Angelee Russel	1975 (aged 15)	1989	(England) Arsenal Academy
(England) Pat Pile	1964 (aged 26)	1989	(England) Hackney
Liz Ross	1973 (aged 17)	1989	(England) Blackburn
Natalie Bowbrick	1971 (aged 18)	1988	
(England) Andrea Wright		1989	(England) Chelmsford
(Wales) Ann Marie Daniel		1989	(England) Islington
(England) Janette Smith		1987	(England) Arsenal Academy
Simone Blasi		1989	(England) Islington
Sheila McGregor		1989	(England) Islington
Sharon Dixon		1989	
Unknown
Joanne Cook	1973 (aged 17)	1989	(England) Arsenal Academy
Fran Sheriden		1989	(England) Islington

=== Goalscorers ===
Rank	Position	Name	HC League	FA Cup	Total
1	MF	(England) Sarah Mulligan	3	5	8
2	FW	(England) Caroline McGloin	5	1	6
3	DF	(England) Michelle Curley	2	0	2
3	FW	Sharon Dixon	1	1	2
5	MF	(England) Sharon Barber	1	0	1
5	FW	(England) Pat Pile	1	0	1
5	DF	(England) Columbine Saunders	1	0	1
Unknown goalscorer			9	8	17
Own goal			1	0	1
Total			24	15	39

== Transfers, loans and other signings ==
=== Transfers in ===
Announcement date	Position	Player	From club
1989	GK	Jackie Eimermann	(England) Islington
1989	GK	(England) Nancy Jeffery	(England) Limehouse
1989	DF	(England) Columbine Saunders	(England) Islington
1989	DF	(England) Lisa Spry	(England) Islington
1989	DF	Caroline Munns	(England) Islington
1989	MF	(England) Marlene Egan	(England) Islington
1989	MF	(Scotland) Jennifer Strange	(England) Islington
1989	MF	Michelle Kilner	(England) Islington
1989	MF	Lynn Jones	(England) Bolton
1989	FW	(England) Pat Pile	(England) Hackney
1989	FW	(Scotland) Michelle Sneddon	(Scotland) Coltness
1989	FW	(England) Andrea Wright	(England) Chelmsford
1989	FW	Liz Ross	(England) Blackburn
1989	FW	Simone Blasi	(England) Islington
1989	FW	Sheila McGregor	(England) Islington
1989	FW	(Wales) Ann Marie Daniel	(England) Islington
1989		Fran Sheriden	(England) Islington
1989	GK	Shirley Reynolds	
1989	DF	Mandy Eva	
1989	DF	(Sweden) Camilla Kristiansson	
1989	FW	Sharon Dixon	
31 August 1989	FW	(England) Alice Fairbank	(England) Hull City

=== Transfers out ===
Announcement date	Position	Player	To club
July 1989	MF	(Sweden) Lotta Gustafsson	
1989	MF	(England) Sarah Train	Retired
1989	FW	(England) Ali Clement	Retired
1989	FW	(England) Deb Ingram	Sabbatical
1989	DF	Dee Meade	
1989	MF	Denise Brunker	
1989	FW	Mary McGee	
1989	FW	Debbie Cox	
1989	FW	Pat Barber	
1989		(Sweden) Monica Berntsson	
1989		Marcia Phillpotts	
1989		Lisa Sharpe	
1989		Viv Eka	
1989		Lynda Rowley	
1989		Anderson	
1989		Sloan	
October 1989	DF	Gillian Maskell	(England) Millwall Lionesses

== Club ==
=== Kit ===
Supplier: Adidas / Sponsor: JVC

Home	Away

== Competitions ==
=== Home Counties League Division One ===
==== League table ====
Pos	Team	Pld	W	D	L	GF	GA	GD	Pts
1	Millwall Lionesses (C)	12	12	0	0	88	7	+81	24
2	Red Star Southampton	12	8	1	3	63	17	+46	17
3	Friends of Fulham	11	8	1	2	59	11	+48	17
4	Arsenal	11	5	0	6	24	34	−10	10
5	Town and County	12	5	0	7	26	41	−15	10
6	Bracknell	12	1	1	10	14	82	−68	3
7	Newbury	12	0	1	11	5	87	−82	1

Source: HCL
(C) Champions

==== Results by matchday ====
Matchday	1	2	3	4	5	6	7	8	9	10	11	12
Ground	A	H	A	H	A	A	H	A	H	A	H	H
Result	L	W	L	W	L	L	W	W	L	W	L	X

Source: HCL
W = Win; D = Draw; L = Loss; X = Postponed

???	Red Star Southampton	8–0	Arsenal
	Goal	Report

???	Arsenal	4–3	Bracknell	Walthamstow
	Mulligan; McGloin; Barber	Report	Goal	Stadium: Douglas Eyre Sports Centre; Referee: R Parker

???	Town and County	2–1	Arsenal
	Goal	Report	Goal

???	Arsenal	4–0	Newbury	Walthamstow
	Curley; Mulligan (penalty missed); McGloin	Report		Stadium: Douglas Eyre Sports Centre; Referee: R Parker

11 November 1989	Friends of Fulham	5–0	Arsenal
	Spacey; O'Callaghan; McAdam; Jacobs; Hughes	Report

???	Millwall Lionesses	8–0	Arsenal
	Goal	Report

???	Arsenal	4–1	Town and County	Walthamstow
	Goal	Report	Goal	Stadium: Douglas Eyre Sports Centre; Referee: D Chapman

???	Bracknell	2–7	Arsenal
	Goal	Report	Pile 5'; McGloin; Dixon; Saunders; (o.g.)

???	Arsenal	0–2	Millwall Lionesses	Walthamstow
		Report	Goal	Stadium: Douglas Eyre Sports Centre; Referee: R Parker

???	Newbury	0–4	Arsenal
		Report	Goal

???	Arsenal	0–3	Red Star Southampton	Walthamstow
		Report	Goal	Stadium: Douglas Eyre Sports Centre

???	Arsenal	X–X	Friends of Fulham	Walthamstow
		Report		Stadium: Douglas Eyre Sports Centre

=== WFA Cup ===
17 September 1989 Group F - First round	Sutton	w/o	Arsenal
		Report
Note: w/o, Sutton Disqualified

8 October 1989 Group F - Second round	Watford	0–4	Arsenal
		Report	Mulligan; McGloin

5 November 1989 Third round	Scarborough	0–7	Arsenal	Cayton
14:00		Report	Curley; McGloin; Mulligan	Stadium: McCains Sports Field

3 December 1989 Fourth round	Arsenal	4–0	Wigan	Walthamstow
	Mulligan 50'; Dixon	Report		Stadium: Douglas Eyre Sports Centre

4 March 1990 Quarter-finals	Arsenal	0–4	Friends of Fulham	Enfield
12:00 GMT		Report	Spacey; McAdam; Curl; Jacobs	Stadium: Southbury Road; Attendance: 250; Referee: B J Jackson

== Arsenal reserves ==
=== Russell Cup ===
First round	Romford	3–5	Arsenal Reserves

Second round	Broxbourne	0–4	Arsenal Reserves

Semi-final	Patmore	1–10	Arsenal Reserves

1 April 1990 Final	Arsenal Reserves	?–?	Leyton Orient
13:30 GMT				Referee: Bill Saville

== Arsenal thirds ==
=== Anniversary Cup ===
==== Group stage ====
Arsenal Reserves	2–2	Winchester

Arsenal Reserves	7–0	Southend

Winchester	2–1	Arsenal Reserves

Southend	0–7	Arsenal Reserves

==== Knockout phase ====
Semi-final	Arsenal Reserves	6–0	Southwark Spartans

1 April 1990 Final	Arsenal Reserves	2–3 (a.e.t.)	Hackney	Walton-on-Thames
11:30 BST		Report		Stadium: Stompond Lane; Referee: Trevor Bailey

== See also ==
- List of Arsenal W.F.C. seasons
- 1989–90 in English football
