= List of Arsenal W.F.C. seasons =

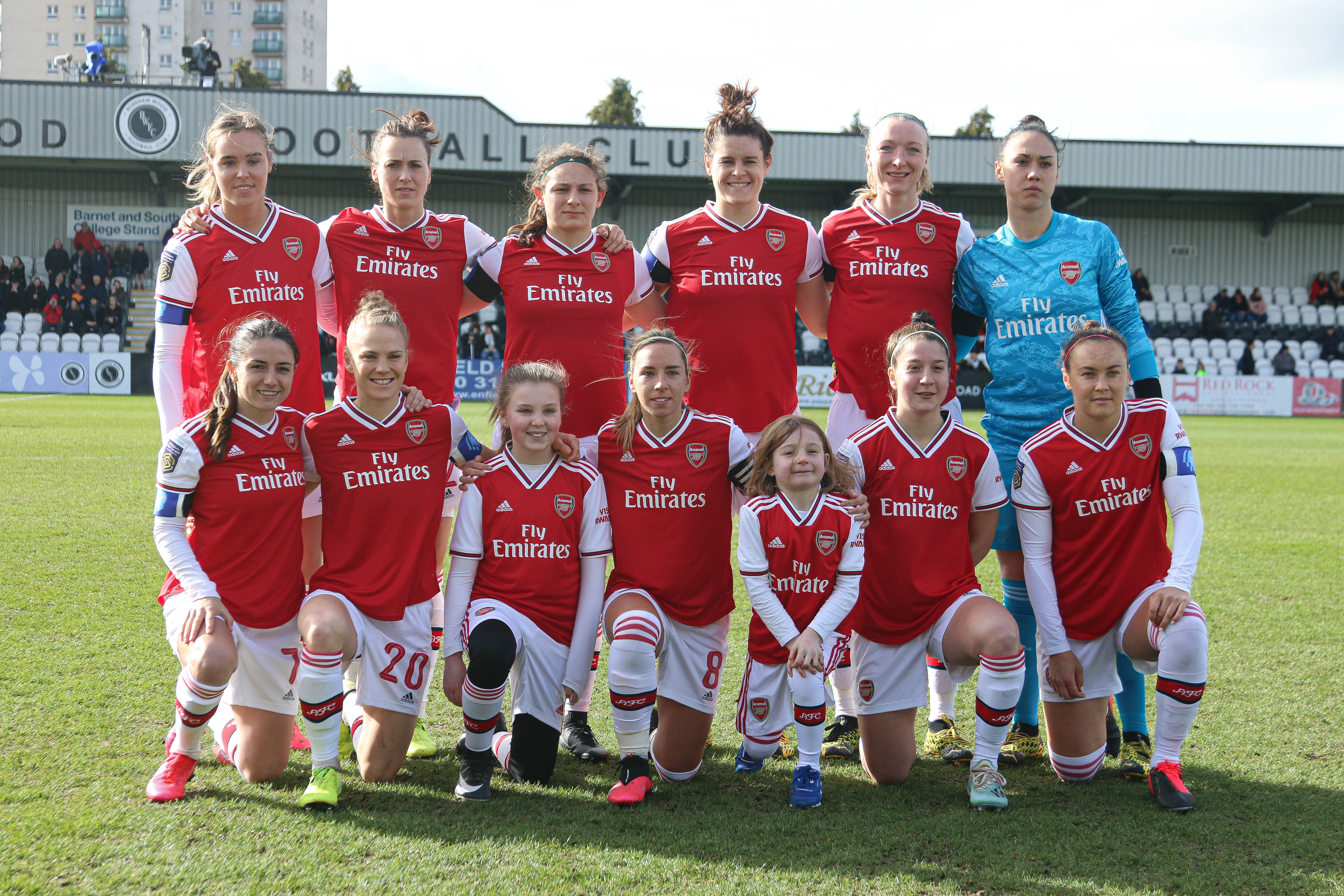
The Arsenal lineup before a match in February 2020

Arsenal Women Football Club (Arsenal W.F.C.) is an English professional association football club based in Holloway, North London. It is in the women's team of Premier League side Arsenal Football Club, which was founded in 1886. Originally formed as Arsenal Ladies in 1987, the club became semi-professional in 2002, and adopted its present name in 2017. The team played regional football in London and South East England until the inception of the nationwide Women's Premier League in 1991 and joined the Women's Super League (WSL) upon its formation in 2011. The club have never been relegated and have never finished below fourth place whilst playing in either the Women's Premier League or the WSL. Arsenal is the most successful women' s team in England, having won 15 domestic league titles, and 14 FA Cups.

Arsenal is the only English side to win Europe's women's football competition, the UEFA Women's Champions League, having defeated Swedish side Umeå in the 2007 final and Spanish side Barcelona in the 2025 final. The club also have a successful record in England's main league cup, having won the FA Women's League Cup (formally FA WSL Cup) a record six times, and the FA Women's National League Cup (while it was England's main league cup) ten times. Arsenal is also the most successful team in the now-defunct Women's FA Community Shield.

== Key ==
League competitions:

- HCL – Home Counties League Division 1, South East England regional amateur league
- GLFLP – Greater London Women's Football League Premier, London based amateur league
- Prem South – FA Women's Premier League Southern Division, English joint second division 1991–2010
- Prem – FA Women's Premier League National Division/FA Women's Premier League, English first division 1991–2010
- WSL – Women's Super League, English first division since 2011

Knock out competitions:

- FA Cup – WFA Cup/Women's FA Cup
- League Cup – England's main league cup; FA Women's National League Cup/FA Women's Premier League Cup (1991–2010) and FA WSL Cup/FA Women's League Cup (since 2011)
- Comm. Shield – Women's FA Charity Shield/Women's FA Community Shield
- UWCL – UEFA Women's Cup/UEFA Women's Champions League

Key to colours and symbols:

1st or W	Winners
2nd or RU	Runners-up
3rd	Third place
	Current Season
↑	Promoted
↓	Relegated
♦	Top scorer in division

Key to league record:

- Season = The year and article of the season
- Pos = Final position
- Pld = Matches played
- W = Matches won
- D = Matches drawn
- L = Matches lost
- GF = Goals scored
- GA = Goals against
- Pts = Points

Key to cup record:

- En-dash (–) = Arsenal did not participate
- DNE = The club did not enter cup play
- QR1 = First qualification round
- QR2 = Second qualification round, etc.
- Group = Group stage
- GS2 = Second group stage
- R1 = First round
- R2 = Second round, etc.
- R32 = Round of 32
- R16 = Round of 16
- QF = Quarter-finals
- SF = Semi-finals
- RU = Runners-up
- W = Winners

== Seasons ==
Results of league and cup competitions by season
Season	Division	Pld	W	D	L	GF	GA	Pts	Pos	FA Cup (Note: Results are sourced from an online database produced by former WFA employees.)	League Cup (Note: Including Arsenal's result history in both competitions that have served as England's main League Cup competition. Editions where Arsenal were finalists are sourced from Rec.Sport.Soccer Statistics Foundation.)	Community Shield (Note: The Women's FA Community Shield was created in 2000 as the FA Women's Charity Shield and was renamed to the FA Community Shield in 2002. The super cup was later discontinued in 2008, but was revived for a single edition in 2020 (Arsenal did not qualify); the competition has not been played since. Arsenal won five editions, and were runners-up in 2002 and 2004.)	Competition	Result	Player(s)	Goals	Ref.
Season	League									FA Cup	League Cup	Community Shield	Other / Europe (Note: The UEFA Women's Champions League was previously known as the UEFA Women's Cup from the competition's formation in 2001 to 2009, when it was renamed ahead of the 2009–10 season. Arsenal's result history in the competition is sourced from UEFA.)		Top goalscorer(s)		Ref.
1987–88	HCL	—	—	—	—	—	—	—	—	R1	—	—	—	—	—	—	
1988–89	HCL	10	3	3	4	12	21	9	4th	R3	R1	—	—	—	—	—	
1989–90	HCL	11	5	0	6	24	34	10	4th	QF	—	—	—	—	—	—	
1990–91	GLRWL	14	10	2	2	50	12	22	3rd	SF	QF	—	—	—	—	—	
1991–92	Prem South ↑	14	11	3	0	99	11	25	1st	R4	W	—	—	—	—	—	
1992–93	Prem	18	17	0	1	66	8	34	1st	W	W	—	—	—	—	—	
1993–94	Prem	18	14	3	1	85	15	45	2nd	QF	W	—	—	—	—	—	
1994–95	Prem	18	17	1	0	60	8	52	1st	W	— (Note: The FA banned all National Premier League sides from playing in the Women's Premier League Cup, to help make England players available to prepare for the 1995 UEFA Women's Championship.)	—	—	—	—	—	
1995–96	Prem	18	11	4	3	54	12	37	3rd	SF	SF	—	—	—	—	—	
1996–97	Prem	18	16	1	1	65	9	49	1st	SF	R2	—	—	—	—	—	
1997–98	Prem	18	12	4	2	55	22	40	2nd	W	W	—	—	—	—	—	
1998–99	Prem	18	13	4	1	59	15	43	2nd	W	W	—	—	—	—	—	
1999–2000	Prem	18	13	2	3	73	13	41	3rd	SF	W	—	—	—	Marianne Spacey	31	
2000–01	Prem	18	17	1	0	88	9	52	1st	W	W	W	—	—	Angela Banks	44	
2001–02	Prem	18	16	1	1	60	15	49	1st	QF	SF	W	UEFA Cup	QF	Marianne Spacey	26	
2002–03	Prem	18	13	1	4	53	21	40	3rd	SF	RU	RU	UEFA Cup	SF	Jayne Ludlow	31	
2003–04	Prem	18	15	2	1	65	11	47	1st	W	SF	—	—	—	Jayne Ludlow	29	
2004–05	Prem	18	15	3	0	57	13	48	1st	SF	W	RU	UEFA Cup	SF	Julie Fleeting	23	
2005–06	Prem	18	16	2	0	83	20	50	1st	W	RU	W	UEFA Cup	QF	Kelly Smith	27 ♦	
2006–07	Prem	22	22	0	0	119	10	66	1st	W	W	W	UEFA Cup	W	Lianne Sanderson	40 ♦	
2007–08	Prem	22	20	2	0	85	15	62	1st	W	RU	— (Note: The 2007 Women's FA Community Shield was not played due to the 2007 FIFA Women's World Cup.)	UEFA Cup	QF	Lianne Sanderson	51 ♦	
2008–09	Prem	22	20	1	1	89	14	61	1st	W	W	W	UEFA Cup	QF	Kim Little	14	
2009–10	Prem	22	20	1	1	79	19	61	1st	RU	SF	—	Champions League	QF	Kim Little	24	
2011	WSL (Note: Between 2011 and 2017, the WSL played each league season within the calendar year instead of the traditional European domestic season. In 2017, the Football Association transitioned the WSL to the traditional season starting in September 2017 and ending in May 2018. The FA conducted an interim Spring Series between February and May 2017 to support the transition.)	14	10	2	2	29	9	32	1st	W	W	—	Champions League	SF	Kim Little	17	
2012	WSL	14	10	4	0	39	18	34	1st	SF	W	—	Champions League	SF	Kim Little	23 ♦	
2013	WSL	14	10	3	1	31	11	30	3rd	W	W	—	Champions League	SF	Danielle Carter	14	
2014	WSL	14	6	3	5	24	21	21	4th	W	RU	—	Champions League	QF	Danielle Carter; Kelly Smith	7	
2015	WSL	14	8	3	3	21	8	27	3rd	QF	W	—	—	—	Natalia Pablos	10	
2016	WSL	16	10	2	4	33	14	32	3rd	W	SF	—	—	—	Danielle Carter	6	
2017	WSL	8	5	3	0	22	9	18	3rd	QF	— (Note: The FA did not host a league cup competition alongside the interim Spring Series.)	—	—	—	Danielle Carter	6	
2017–18	WSL	18	11	4	3	38	18	37	3rd	RU	W	—	—	—	Beth Mead	15	
2018–19	WSL	20	18	0	2	70	13	54	1st	R5	RU	—	—	—	Vivianne Miedema	31 ♦	
2019–20	WSL (Note: The 2019–20 WSL season was postponed mid-season due to the COVID-19 pandemic, it was later ended prematurely on 25 May 2020. Arsenal were awarded third place based on the points per game of their 15 games played.)	15	12	0	3	40	13	36	3rd	QF	RU	—	Champions League	QF	Vivianne Miedema	29 ♦	
2020–21	WSL	22	15	3	4	63	15	48	3rd	RU	GS	—	—	—	Vivianne Miedema	25	
2021–22	WSL	22	17	4	1	65	10	55	2nd	SF	QF	—	Champions League	QF	Vivianne Miedema	23	
2022–23	WSL	22	15	2	5	49	16	47	3rd	R5	W	—	Champions League	SF	Stina Blackstenius	18	
2023–24	WSL	22	16	2	4	53	20	50	3rd	R5	W	—	Champions League	QR1	Stina Blackstenius	18	
2024–25	WSL	22	15	3	4	62	26	48	2nd	QF	SF	—	Champions League	W	Alessia Russo	20 ♦	
2025–26	WSL	22	15	6	1	53	14	51	2nd	QF	SF	—	Champions League Champions Cup	SF W	Alessia Russo	24	
