= 1988–89 Arsenal L.F.C. season =

English women's football club season

Arsenal Ladies
1988–89 season
- Chairman: Peter Hill-Wood
- Manager: Vic Akers
- Stadium: Britannia Leisure Centre
- Division One: Fourth Place
- FA Cup: Third Round
- League Cup: Unknown
- Biggest win: 11–1 (vs Gallagher (A), FA Cup, 25 September 1988)
- Biggest defeat: 1–7 (vs Friends of Fulham, (A), Home Counties League, 19 March 1989)
Home colours	Away colours

The 1988–89 season was Arsenal Ladies Football Club's 2nd season since forming in 1987. The club participated in the Home Counties Division One.

Arsenal also played in the FA Cup, reaching the Third Round, where they were knocked out by Nottingham Rangers. They were also knocked out of the Home Counties League Cup by Biggleswade.

With the influx of players, a Reserve side was formed. Whilst the First Team competed in the Home Counties Division One, the Reserve Team played in Division Three of the Greater London Women's League. The Reserve Team won the Division Three Title in their first season with an unbeaten campaign, winning promotion to Division Two. The Reserves also won the Anniversary Cup, beating Teynham Gunners 5–0 in the Final.

== Squad information & statistics ==
=== First team squad ===
Name	Date of birth (age)	Since	Signed from
Goalkeepers
Jayne Hammond	1974 (aged 15)	1988	
Sue Street		1988	(England) Millwall Lionesses
Defenders
(England) Kirsty Pealling	14 April 1975 (aged 14)	1987	(England) Arsenal Academy
(England) Michelle Curley	30 April 1972 (aged 17)	1987	(England) Arsenal Academy
(England) Gill Bordman (c)	26 October 1956 (aged 32)	1987	(England) Aylesbury
(England) Paula Birri	2 May 1971 (aged 18)	1988	(England) Arsenal Academy
(England) Alicia O'Grady	1962 (aged 26)	1987	(England) Aylesbury
(England) Angela Coneron	1959 (aged 30)	1987	(England) Aylesbury
(Republic of Ireland) Eileen Ahearne	1971 (aged 18)	1988	(England) Tottenham
(England) Annie Deegan	1972 (aged 17)	1988	(England) Arsenal Academy
Dee Meade	1957 (aged 32)	1987	(England) Friends of Fulham
Sarah Ritchie	1968 (aged 21)	1988	(England) Arsenal Academy
Johanna Galligan	1972 (aged 17)	1988	
Gillian Maskell		1987	(England) Friends of Fulham
Hazel Braund		1988	(England) Millwall Lionesses
Midfielders
(England) Sarah Train	12 August 1969 (aged 19)	1987	(England) Arsenal Academy
(England) Wendy Ward	26 June 1958 (aged 31)	1987	(England) Aylesbury
(England) Sharon Barber	27 May 1969 (aged 20)	1988	(England) Tottenham
Denise Brunker	1960 (aged 28)	1989	Retirement
(England) Michelle Lee	1974 (aged 15)	1988	(England) Arsenal Academy
Debbie Cox	1967 (aged 22)	1988	
(Sweden) Lotta Gustafsson	1970 (aged 19)	1987	
Forwards
(Wales) Naz Ball	28 February 1961 (aged 28)	1987	(England) Aylesbury
(England) Ali Clement	5 June 1963 (aged 26)	1987	(England) Aylesbury
(England) Sarah Mulligan	22 July 1972 (aged 16)	1988	(England) Stevenage
(England) Kelly Townshend	12 May 1977 (aged 12)	1988	(England) Arsenal Academy
(England) Deb Ingram	13 May 1963 (aged 26)	1987	(England) Aylesbury
(England) Caroline McGloin	25 April 1960 (aged 29)	1987	(England) Aylesbury
(England) Sarah Ryan	1 July 1972 (aged 16)	1987	(England) Arsenal Academy
Pat Barber	1968 (aged 21)	1988	(England) Friends of Fulham
Natalie Bowbrick	1971 (aged 18)	1988	
(England) Janette Smith		1987	(England) Arsenal Academy
Mary McGee		1988	
Unknown
(Sweden) Monica Berntsson		1988	
Marcia Phillpotts		1988	
Lisa Sharpe		1988	
Viv Eka		1988	
Linda Rowley		1988	
Anderson		1988	
Sloan		1988	

=== Appearances and goals ===
Name	HC League		FA/HCL Cup		Sub	GL League		GL/R/A Cup		Sub	Total	
Name	Apps	Goals	Apps	Goals	Apps	Apps	Goals	Apps	Goals	Apps	Apps	Goals
Goalkeepers
Jayne Hammond	0	0	0	0	0	16	0	6	0	0	16	0
Sue Street	8	0	4	0	0	1	0	0	0	0	13	0
Defenders
(England) Kirsty Pealling	0	0	0	0	0	0	0	0	0	0	0	0
(England) Michelle Curley	9	1	4	0	0	3	6	1	1	0	17	8
(England) Gill Bordman (c)	9	0	5	0	0	0	0	0	0	0	14	0
(England) Paula Birri	0	0	0	0	0	13	0	4	0	3	17+3	0
(England) Alicia O'Grady	11	0	4	0	0	3	0	0	0	0	18	0
(England) Angela Coneron	9	0	4	0	0	0	0	0	0	0	13	0
(Republic of Ireland) Eileen Ahearne	0	0	0	0	0	15	3	5	0	1	20+1	3
(England) Annie Deegan	0	0	0	0	0	8	0	4	0	7	12+7	0
Dee Meade	3	0	4	3	1	5	0	3	1	0	15+1	0
Sarah Ritchie	8	0	1	0	0	5	6	3	0	0	17	6
Johanna Galligan	0	0	0	0	0	15	0	5	0	1	20+1	0
Gillian Maskell	10	0	5	0	0	0	0	0	0	0	15	0
Hazel Braund	0	0	0	0	0	8	2	1	0	3	9+3	2
Midfielders
(England) Sarah Train	0	0	1	1	0	10	3	2	0	2	13+2	4
(England) Wendy Ward	0	0	0	0	0	0	0	0	0	0	0	0
(England) Sharon Barber	0	0	0	0	0	0	0	0	0	0	0	0
Denise Brunker	0	0	0	0	0	3	5	3	3	3	6+3	8
(England) Michelle Lee	0	0	0	0	0	15	17	6	2	0	21	19
Debbie Cox	3	0	1	2	0	3	0	3	6	0	10	8
(Sweden) Lotta Gustafsson	0	0	0	0	0	4	6	2	2	0	6	8
Forwards
(Wales) Naz Ball	10	3	5	7	0	0	0	0	0	0	15	10
(England) Ali Clement	0	0	0	0	0	1	0	0	0	0	1	0
(England) Sarah Mulligan	1	0	1	0	1	15	24	6	5	1	23+2	29
(England) Kelly Townshend	0	0	0	0	0	0	0	0	0	0	0	0
(England) Deb Ingram	0	0	0	0	0	0	0	0	0	0	0	0
(England) Caroline McGloin	9	4	4	4	0	2	2	0	0	0	15	10
(England) Sarah Ryan	0	0	0	0	0	10	10	5	3	1	15+1	13
Pat Barber	8	0	5	0	0	1	0	1	0	0	15	0
Natalie Bowbrick	0	0	0	0	0	10	11	1	0	5	11+5	11
(England) Janette Smith	0	0	0	0	0	0	0	0	0	0	0	0
Mary McGee	0	0	0	0	0	0	2	4	0	0	2	4
Unknown
(Sweden) Monica Berntsson	2	1	0	0	0	0	0	0	0	0	2	1
Marcia Phillpotts	7	0	4	0	0	0	0	0	0	0	11	0
Lisa Sharpe	0	0	0	0	0	6	3	2	0	1	8+1	3
Viv Eka	0	0	0	0	0	2	3	1	0	2	3+2	3
Linda Rowley	0	0	0	0	0	0	1	0	0	2	2	1
Anderson	0	0	0	0	0	2	0	0	0	5	2+5	0
Sloan	0	0	0	0	0	4	0	1	0	1	5+1	0

=== Goalscorers ===
Rank	Position	Name	HC League	FA/HCL Cup	GL League	GL/R/A Cup	Total
1	FW	(England) Sarah Mulligan	0	0	24	5	29
2	MF	(England) Michelle Lee	0	0	17	2	19
3	FW	(England) Sarah Ryan	0	0	10	3	13
4	FW	Natalie Bowbrick	0	0	11	0	11
5	FW	(Wales) Naz Ball	3	7	0	0	10
5	FW	(England) Caroline McGloin	4	4	2	0	10
7	DF	(England) Michelle Curley	1	0	6	1	8
7	FW	Debbie Cox	0	2	0	6	8
7	MF	(Sweden) Lotta Gustafsson	0	0	6	2	8
7	MF	Denise Brunker	0	0	5	3	8
11	MF	Sarah Ritchie	0	0	6	0	6
12	DF	(England) Alicia O'Grady	1	3	1	0	5
12	MF	Pat Barber	1	0	3	1	5
14	MF	(England) Sarah Train	0	1	3	0	4
14	FW	Mary McGee	0	0	4	0	4
14	FW	Dee Meade	0	3	0	1	4
17	DF	(Republic of Ireland) Eileen Ahearne	0	0	3	0	3
17	-	Viv Eka	0	0	3	0	3
17	-	Lisa Sharpe	0	0	3	0	3
20	DF	Hazel Braund	0	0	2	0	2
21	DF	Gillian Maskell	1	0	0	0	1
21	-	(Sweden) Monica Berntsson	1	0	0	0	1
21	-	Linda Rowley	0	0	1	0	1
Unknown goalscorer			0	0	0	4	4
Own goal			0	0	2	1	3
Total			12	20	112	29	173

== Transfers, loans and other signings ==
=== Transfers in ===
Announcement date	Position	Player	From club
1988	GK	Sue Street	(England) Millwall Lionesses
1988	DF	(Republic of Ireland) Eileen Ahearne	(England) Tottenham
1988	DF	Hazel Braund	(England) Millwall Lionesses
1988	MF	(England) Sharon Barber	(England) Tottenham
1988	FW	Pat Barber	(England) Friends of Fulham
1988	MF	(Sweden) Lotta Gustafsson	
1988	FW	Mary McGee	
1988	FW	Natalie Bowbrick	
1988		(Sweden) Monica Berntsson	
1988		Marcia Phillpotts	
1988		Lisa Sharpe	
1988		Viv Eka	
1988		Lynda Rowley	
1988		Anderson	
1988		Sloan	
September 1988	FW	(England) Sarah Mulligan	(England) Stevenage
September 1988	GK	Jayne Hammond	
1989	MF	Denise Brunker	Retirement

=== Transfers out ===
Announcement date	Position	Player	To club
1988	GK	(England) Terri Hinton	(England) Bracknell
1988	DF	(Wales) Debbie Fox	(England) Newbury
1988	DF	(England) Amanda Marsden	(England) Newbury
1988	FW	Trudi Mahoney	(England) Biggleswade

== Club ==
=== Kit ===
Supplier: Adidas / Sponsor: JVC

Home	Away

== Competitions ==
=== Home Counties League Division One ===
==== League table ====
Pos	Team	Pld	W	D	L	GF	GA	GD	Pts	Qualification or relegation
1	Millwall Lionesses (C)	10	8	1	1	30	7	+23	17	
2	Friends of Fulham	9	5	2	2	24	12	+12	12	
3	Red Star Southampton	10	4	1	5	24	17	+7	9	
4	Arsenal	10	3	3	4	12	21	−9	9	
5	Biggleswade	9	3	2	4	14	23	−9	8	Club dissolved after the end of the season
6	Newbury	10	1	1	8	13	37	−24	3	
7	Solent (R)	0	0	0	0	0	0	0	0	Club withdrew from league. All results expunged for this season. Relegation to Division Two
8	Milton Keynes (R)	0	0	0	0	0	0	0	0	Club withdrew from league. All results expunged for this season.

Source: HCL
(C) Champions; (R) Relegated

Solent and Milton Keynes withdrew from league. All records from that season were expunged. Solent were relegated to Home Counties League Division Two.

==== Results by matchday ====
Matchday	1	2	3	4	5	6	7	8	9	10	11	12	13	14	15	16
Ground	A	A	H	H	H	A	A	H	H	A	A	H	A	H	H	A
Result	X	X	X	W	D	L	L	X	L	W	D	W	L	D	X	X

Source: HCL
W = Win; D = Draw; L = Loss; X = Postponed

11 September 1988 1	Solent	X–X	Arsenal
		Report

2 October 1988 2	Milton Keynes	X–X	Arsenal
		Report

16 October 1988 3	Arsenal	X–X	Solent	Hoxton
		Report		Stadium: Britannia Leisure Centre

30 October 1988 4	Arsenal	4–1	Newbury	Hoxton
14:30 BST	Ball; Barber; Maskell	Report	Goal	Stadium: Britannia Leisure Centre

13 November 1988 5	Arsenal	0–0	Friends of Fulham	Hoxton
14:30 GMT		Report		Stadium: Britannia Leisure Centre

27 November 1988 6	Millwall Lionesses	4–0	Arsenal
	Goal	Report

11 December 1988 7	Red Star Southampton	4–1	Arsenal
	Goal	Report	McGloin

8 January 1989 8	Arsenal	X–X	Milton Keynes	Hoxton
		Report		Stadium: Britannia Leisure Centre

8 January 1989 9	Arsenal	0–2	Millwall Lionesses	Hoxton
13:30 GMT		Report	Goal	Stadium: Britannia Leisure Centre

22 January 1989 10	Biggleswade	1–3	Arsenal
	Caleb 88'	Report	Curley; McGloin; Ball

29 January 1989 11	Newbury	2–2	Arsenal
	(pen.)	Report	McGloin (pen.); Berntsson

26 February 1989 12	Arsenal	1–0	Red Star Southampton	Hoxton
14:15 BST	McGloin (pen.)	Report		Stadium: Britannia Leisure Centre

19 March 1989 13	Friends of Fulham	7–1	Arsenal
	Goal	Report	O'Grady

9 April 1989 14	Arsenal	0–0	Biggleswade	Hoxton
14:00 GMT		Report		Stadium: Britannia Leisure Centre

=== WFA Cup ===
25 September 1988 Group B - First round	Gallaher	0–11	Arsenal
		Report	Ball; McGloin; Meade; O'Grady; Train

16 October 1988 Group B - Second round	Arsenal	1–1 (a.e.t.)	Islington	Hoxton
14:30	Cox	Report	Goal	Stadium: Britannia Leisure Centre; Referee: T. A. Clover

23 October 1988 Group B - Second round (replay)	Islington	2–3	Arsenal
	Goal	Report	Cox; Meade; Ball

6 November 1988 Third round	Nottingham Rangers	5–3	Arsenal
	Goal	Report	Ball; O'Grady; McGloin

=== Home Counties League Cup ===
20 November 1988	Arsenal	2–6	Biggleswade	Hoxton
14:00 GMT	Ball; McGloin	Report	James; (o.g.); Robinson 55'; Dawson; Mahoney	Stadium: Britannia Leisure Centre

== Arsenal reserves ==
=== Greater London Women's League Division Three ===
Arsenal Reserves	6–0	Winchester/Camden
Curley; Lee; Mulligan; Train; Braund	Report

Basildon	1–3	Arsenal Reserves
(o.g.)	Report	Curley

Arsenal Reserves	5–1	Chelmsford
Lee; Mulligan; Braund	Report	Goal

Patmore Youth Club	1–14	Arsenal Reserves
Goal	Report	Ryan; Eka; Lee; Train; Rowley

Arsenal Reserves	6–3	Friends of Fulham Thirds
Mulligan; Bowbrick; Lee; Sharpe	Report	1'

Chingford Reserves	1–5	Arsenal Reserves
Goal	Report	Bowbrick; Ryan; Brunker

Arsenal Reserves	2–2	Romford Reserves
Ryan; (o.g.)	Report	Goal

Arsenal Reserves	5–5	Basildon
Mulligan; Lee; Brunker	Report	Goal

Winchester/Camden	2–4	Arsenal
Goal	Report	McGloin; Mulligan; Sharpe

Chelmsford	3–5	Arsenal Reserves
Goal	Report	Mulligan; Ryan; Ahearne; Bowbrick

Hackney	2–8	Arsenal Reserves
Goal		Ritchie; Mulligan; Sharpe; (o.g.)

Romford Reserves	1–11	Arsenal Reserves
Goal	Report	Gustafsson; Barber; Mulligan; Lee; Bowbrick

Friends of Fulham Thirds	0–8	Arsenal Reserves
		Mulligan; Lee; Bowbrick; Ritchie; O'Grady

Teynham Gunners	0–5	Arsenal Reserves
		Mulligan; Lee

Arsenal Reserves	4–4	Hackney
Mulligan; Lee; Brunker	Report	Goal

Arsenal Reserves	12–2	Chingford Reserves
Mulligan; McGee; Lee; Curley; Bowbrick; Ryan; Brunker	Report	Goal

Arsenal Reserves	7–1	Teynham Gunners
Gustafsson; Bowbrick; Ahearne; McGee		Goal

Patmore Youth Club	?–?	Arsenal Reserves

=== Greater London Women's League Cup ===
Preliminary round	Millwall Lionesses Reserves	8–0	Arsenal Reserves

=== Russell Cup ===
Arsenal Reserves	4–2	Hackney
	Report

Arsenal Reserves	4–5 (a.e.t.)	Pinewood
Meade; Barber; Gustafsson (pen.)	Report	118'

=== Anniversary Cup ===
First round	Hackney	1–6	Arsenal Reserves
	Goal	Report	Brunker; Curley; Mulligan; Ryan

Semi final	Friends of Fulham Thirds	0–10	Arsenal Reserves
		Report	Cox; Ryan; Mulligan; Lee; (o.g.)

16 April 1989 Final	Arsenal Reserves	5–0	Teynham Gunners	Walton-on-Thames
11:30 BST	Cox; Mulligan (pen.)	Report		Stadium: Stompond Lane

== See also ==
- List of Arsenal W.F.C. seasons
- 1988–89 in English football
