= 1987–88 Arsenal L.F.C. season =

English women's football club season

Arsenal Ladies
1987–88 season
- Chairman: Peter Hill-Wood
- Manager: Vic Akers
- Stadium: Unknown
- Division One: Unknown
- FA Cup: First Round
- League Cup: Unknown
- Waterlooville Cup: Winners
| Home colours | Away colours |

The 1987–88 season was Arsenal Ladies Football Club's 1st season of existence, following the merger of Aylesbury Ladies FC and the Arsenal FC Youth Training Scheme for girls.

Aylesbury Ladies FC were competing in the Home Counties League Division One at the time. Arsenal took their slot in the League ahead of the 1987–88 season. The manager of Aylesbury at the time, Bob Sayell, emigrated to Menorca, so Vic Akers took over the running of the club following his departure.

Arsenal also played in the FA Cup, but were knocked out in the first round by Milton Keynes. By being knocked out in the first round, Arsenal qualified for the Waterlooville Cup, and won their first trophy by defeating Hemel Hempstead in the final.

Gill Bordman and Deb Ingram both won Arsenal Ladies' first Player of the Season Award.

== Squad information & statistics ==
=== First team squad ===
| Name | Date of birth (age) | Since | Signed from |
Goalkeepers
| (England) Terri Hinton | 1952 (aged 35) | 1987 | (England) Aylesbury |
Defenders
| (England) Kirsty Pealling | 14 April 1975 (aged 13) | 1987 | (England) Arsenal Academy |
| (England) Michelle Curley | 30 April 1972 (aged 16) | 1987 | (England) Arsenal Academy |
| (England) Gill Bordman | 26 October 1956 (aged 31) | 1987 | (England) Aylesbury |
| (Wales) Debbie Fox (c) | 8 August 1960 (aged 27) | 1987 | (England) Aylesbury |
| (England) Amanda Marsden | 9 October 1957 (aged 30) | 1987 | (England) Aylesbury |
| (England) Alicia O'Grady | 1962 (aged 25) | 1987 | (England) Aylesbury |
| (England) Angela Coneron | 1958 (aged 30) | 1987 | (England) Aylesbury |
| Dee Meade | 1957 (aged 31) | 1987 | (England) Friends of Fulham |
| Johanna Galligan | 1972 (aged 16) | 1988 | |
| Gillian Maskell | | 1987 | (England) Friends of Fulham |
Midfielders
| (England) Sarah Train | 12 August 1969 (aged 18) | 1987 | (England) Arsenal Academy |
| (England) Wendy Ward | 26 June 1958 (aged 30) | 1987 | (England) Aylesbury |
| (Sweden) Lotta Gustafsson | 1970 (aged 18) | 1988 | |
| Debbie Cox | 1967 (aged 21) | 1988 | |
Forwards
| (Wales) Naz Ball | 28 February 1961 (aged 27) | 1987 | (England) Aylesbury |
| (England) Ali Clement | 5 June 1963 (aged 25) | 1987 | (England) Aylesbury |
| (England) Deb Ingram | 13 May 1963 (aged 25) | 1987 | (England) Aylesbury |
| (England) Caroline McGloin | 25 April 1960 (aged 28) | 1987 | (England) Aylesbury |
| (England) Sarah Ryan | 1 July 1972 (aged 15) | 1987 | (England) Arsenal Academy |
| (England) Janette Smith | | 1987 | (England) Arsenal Academy |
| Trudi Mahoney | | 1987 | (England) Aylesbury |

== Transfers, loans and other signings ==
=== Transfers in ===
| Announcement date | Position | Player | From club |
|---|---|---|---|
| 1987 | DF | Gillian Maskell | (England) Friends of Fulham |
| 1987 | DF | Dee Meade | (England) Friends of Fulham |
| January 1988 | DF | Johanna Galligan | |
| January 1988 | MF | Debbie Cox | |
| January 1988 | MF | (Sweden) Lotta Gustafsson | |

=== Transfers out ===
| Announcement date | Position | Player | To club |

== Club ==
=== Kit ===
Supplier: Adidas / Sponsor: JVC

| Home | Away |

== Competitions ==
=== Home Counties League ===
| 10 January 1988 | Friends of Fulham | 4–0 | Arsenal |
| | Goal | Report |

| 05 June 1988 | Arsenal | 1–3 | Friends of Fulham |
| | Goal | Report | Goal |

| ??? | Arsenal | ?–? | Biggleswade |
| | | Report |

| ??? | Arsenal | ?–? | Brighton C & C Sports |
| | | Report |

| ??? | Arsenal | ?–? | Chelsea |
| | | Report |

| ??? | Arsenal | ?–? | Millwall Lionesses |
| | | Report |

| ??? | Arsenal | ?–? | Red Star Southampton |
| | | Report |

| ??? | Arsenal | ?–? | Solent |
| | | Report |

| ??? | Biggleswade | ?–? | Arsenal |
| | | Report |

| ??? | Brighton C & C Sports | ?–? | Arsenal |
| | | Report |

| ??? | Chelsea | ?–? | Arsenal |
| | | Report |

| ??? | Millwall Lionesses | ?–? | Arsenal |
| | | Report |

| ??? | Red Star Southampton | ?–? | Arsenal |
| | | Report |

| ??? | Solent | ?–? | Arsenal |
| | | Report |

=== WFA Cup ===
| 06 September 1987 Group B - First round | Arsenal | 2–3 | Milton Keynes |
| | Goal | Report | Goal |

=== Waterlooville Cup ===
| Arsenal | 3–1 | Swindon |
| Goal | | Goal |

| Arsenal | 2–1 | Bournemouth |
| Goal | | Goal |

| 8 May 1988 Final | Arsenal | 1–0 | Hemel Hempstead | Baldock |
| 16:30 BST | Ryan | | | Stadium: Norton Road |

== See also ==
- List of Arsenal W.F.C. seasons
- 1987–88 in English football
