= 2008 FA Cup =

2008 FA Cup may refer to:

- 2007–08 FA Cup
  - 2008 FA Cup final
- 2007–08 FA Women's Cup
  - 2008 FA Women's Cup final
- 2008–09 FA Cup
- 2008–09 FA Women's Cup
