= 1990–91 Arsenal L.F.C. season =

English women's football club season

Arsenal Ladies
1990–91 season
- Chairman: Peter Hill-Wood
- Manager: Vic Akers
- Stadium: Douglas Eyre Sports Centre
- Football League: Third Place
- FA Cup: Semi Final
- Greater London League Cup: Quarter Final
Home colours	Away colours

The 1990–91 season was Arsenal Ladies Football Club's 4th season since forming in 1987. The club moved from the Home Counties League, and instead participated in the Greater London Regional Women's League Division One. Here, they finished in third place behind Friends of Fulham and Millwall Lionesses.

The following season would see the introduction of the WFA National League, the first time a nationwide Women's Football League would be implemented in England. With the top two sides qualifying for the Premier Division, Arsenal were instead placed in the Southern Division, missing out on the Premier Division by one point.

Arsenal also played in the FA Cup, where they made history by playing their first ever match at Highbury in a Quarter Final replay against Davies Argyle.

The team progressed to the Semi Finals for the first time in their history. However, they lost the tie to Millwall Lionesses, thanks to an injury time winner from Lynne McCormick.

This would be Arsenal's final season at the Douglas Eyre Sports Centre. In the summer, the club moved to the Hare & Hounds Stadium at Leyton Wingate.

== Squad information & statistics ==
=== First team squad ===
Name	Date of Birth (Age)	Since	Signed From
Goalkeepers
(England) Pauline Cope	16 February 1969 (aged 22)	1990	(England) Millwall Lionesses
(England) Nancy Jeffery	18 February 1978 (aged 13)	1989	(England) Limehouse
Defenders
(England) Kirsty Pealling	14 April 1975 (aged 16)	1987	(England) Arsenal Academy
(England) Michelle Curley	30 April 1972 (aged 19)	1987	(England) Arsenal Academy
(England) Gill Bordman	26 October 1956 (aged 34)	1987	(England) Aylesbury
(England) Paula Birri	2 May 1971 (aged 22)	1989	(England) Arsenal Academy
(England) Kellie Battams	17 January 1977 (aged 13)	1989	(England) Arsenal Academy
(England) Amy Lamont	5 May 1974 (aged 18)	1989	(England) Arsenal Academy
(England) Lisa Spry	15 January 1968 (aged 23)	1989	(England) Islington
(Republic of Ireland) Janet Clarke	19 March 1973 (aged 18)	1989	(England) Arsenal Academy
(England) Columbine Saunders	9 November 1969 (aged 21)	1989	(England) Islington
(England) Alicia O'Grady	1962 (aged 28)	1987	(England) Aylesbury
(England) Angela Coneron	1959 (aged 32)	1987	(England) Aylesbury
(England) Annie Deegan	1972 (aged 19)	1988	(England) Arsenal Academy
Midfielders
(England) Sian Williams	2 February 1968 (aged 23)	1990	(England) Millwall Lionesses
(England) Marlene Egan	7 March 1964 (aged 27)	1989	(England) Islington
(England) Sharon Barber	27 May 1969 (aged 22)	1988	(England) Tottenham
(England) Michelle Lee	1974 (aged 17)	1990	(England) Arsenal Academy
(Scotland) Jennifer Strange		1989	(England) Islington
Forwards
(Wales) Naz Ball	28 February 1961 (aged 30)	1987	(England) Aylesbury
(England) Jo Churchman	8 October 1963 (aged 27)	1990	(England) Millwall Lionesses
(Scotland) Michelle Sneddon	18 January 1974 (aged 17)	1989	(Scotland) Coltness
(England) Sarah Mulligan	22 July 1972 (aged 18)	1988	(England) Stevenage
(England) Kelly Townshend	12 May 1977 (aged 14)	1988	(England) Arsenal Academy
(England) Sarah Ryan	1 July 1972 (aged 18)	1987	(England) Arsenal Academy
(England) Deb Ingram	13 May 1963 (aged 28)	1987	Sabbatical
(England) Caroline McGloin (c)	25 April 1960 (aged 31)	1987	(England) Aylesbury
(England) Alice Fairbank	2 November 1972 (aged 18)	1989	(England) Hull City
(England) Pat Pile	1964 (aged 27)	1989	(England) Hackney
(England) Janette Smith		1987	(England) Arsenal Academy
(England) Andrea Wright		1989	(England) Chelmsford
Unknown
Joanne Cook	1973 (aged 18)	1993	(England) Arsenal Academy

== Transfers, loans and other signings ==
=== Transfers in ===
Announcement date	Position	Player	From club
1990	FW	(England) Jo Churchman	(England) Millwall Lionesses
1990	GK	(England) Pauline Cope	(England) Millwall Lionesses
1990	MF	(England) Sian Williams	(England) Millwall Lionesses
1990	FW	(England) Deb Ingram	Sabbatical

=== Transfers out ===
Announcement date	Position	Player	To club
1990	GK	Jackie Eimermann	(England) Wimbledon
1990	DF	(Republic of Ireland) Eileen Ahearne	(England) Tottenham
1990	MF	Michelle Kilner	(England) Tottenham
1990	FW	Natalie Browbrick	(England) Tottenham
1990	FW	(Wales) Ann Marie Daniel	(England) Tottenham
1990	MF	(England) Wendy Ward	(England) Bracknell
1990	GK	Sue Street	(England) Hampstead Heathens
1990	DF	Hazel Braund	(England) Hampstead Heathens
1990	GK	Jayne Hammmond	
1990	GK	Shirley Reynolds	
1990	DF	Johanna Galligan	
1990	DF	Caroline Munns	
1990	DF	Mandy Eva	
1990	DF	(Sweden) Camilla Kristiansson	
1989	DF	Sarah Ritchie	
1990	MF	Lynn Jones	
1990	FW	Angelee Russel	
1990	FW	Liz Ross	
1990	FW	Simone Blasi	
1990	FW	Sheila McGregor	
1990	FW	Sharon Dixon	

== Club ==
=== Kit ===
Supplier: Adidas / Sponsor: JVC

Home	Away

== Competitions ==
=== Greater London Regional Women's League Premier ===
==== League table ====
Pos	Team	Pld	W	D	L	GF	GA	GD	Pts	Qualification or relegation
1	Millwall Lionesses (C)	14	12	2	0	57	4	+53	26	Qualification for the National League Premier Division
2	Friends of Fulham	14	10	3	1	80	8	+72	23	Qualification for the National League Premier Division
3	Arsenal	14	10	2	2	50	12	+38	22	Qualification for the National League Southern Division
4	Chelsea	14	5	1	8	22	33	−11	11	
5	Leyton Orient	14	4	3	7	16	43	−27	11	
6	Tottenham	14	3	1	10	14	55	−41	7	
7	Spurs	14	3	0	11	12	51	−39	6	
8	Watford	14	2	2	10	12	57	−45	6	

Source: GLLP
(C) Champions

==== Results by matchday ====
???	Arsenal	6–1	Chelsea	Walthamstow
	Goal	Report	Goal	Stadium: Douglas Eyre Sports Centre

???	Arsenal	5–1	Leyton Orient	Walthamstow
	Goal	Report	Goal	Stadium: Douglas Eyre Sports Centre

10 November 1990	Friends of Fulham	2–2	Arsenal
	Goal	Report	Goal

???	Arsenal	?–?	Millwall Lionesses	Walthamstow
		Report		Stadium: Douglas Eyre Sports Centre

???	Arsenal	?–?	Spurs	Walthamstow
		Report		Stadium: Douglas Eyre Sports Centre

???	Arsenal	?–?	Tottenham	Walthamstow
		Report		Stadium: Douglas Eyre Sports Centre

???	Arsenal	?–?	Watford	Walthamstow
		Report		Stadium: Douglas Eyre Sports Centre

???	Chelsea	?–?	Arsenal
		Report

???	Leyton Orient	?–?	Arsenal
		Report

???	Millwall Lionesses	?–?	Arsenal
		Report

???	Spurs	?–?	Arsenal
		Report

???	Tottenham	?–?	Arsenal
		Report

???	Watford	?–?	Arsenal
		Report

14 May 1991	Arsenal	0–0	Friends of Fulham
		Report

=== WFA Cup ===
6 January 1991 Fourth round	Arsenal	2–0	Chelsea	Walthamstow
	Goal	Report		Stadium: Douglas Eyre Sports Centre

3 February 1991 Fifth round	Arsenal	2–0	Cardiff	Walthamstow
	Lee; Churchman	Report		Stadium: Douglas Eyre Sports Centre

3 March 1991 Quarter-finals	Daives Argyle	2–2 (a.e.t.)	Arsenal	Lenton
	White 65'; Smith 74' (pen.)	Report	Churchman; O'Grady

10 March 1991 Quarter-finals (Replay)	Arsenal	3–0 (a.e.t.)	Davies Argyle	Highbury
	Pile; Churchman	Report		Stadium: Highbury; Referee: Tony Ward

7 April 1991 Semi-finals	Arsenal	1–2	Millwall Lionesses	Watford
	Pile 26'	Report	McCormick 52', 90+2'	Stadium: Vicarage Road; Referee: A. W. Ward

=== Greater London League Cup ===
11 February 1991 Quarter-finals	Arsenal	1–2	Friends of Fulham	Walthamstow
	Goal		Goal	Stadium: Douglas Eyre Sports Centre

== See also ==
- List of Arsenal W.F.C. seasons
- 1990–91 in English football
