= 2007–08 FA Women's Premier League Cup =

Football tournament

Tournament details
- Country: England

Final positions
- Champions: Everton
- Runners-up: Arsenal

The FA Women's Premier League Cup 2007–08 was the 17th staging of the FA Women's Premier League Cup, a knockout competition for England's top 36 women's football clubs.

The tournament was won by Everton, who beat previous holders Arsenal 1–0 in the final; this was Everton's first title.

== Results ==
=== Preliminary round ===
All played on 2 September.

2 September 2007	Millwall Lionesses (S)	1–3	Lincoln City (NO)
14:00	Douglas	Report	Harris; Michalska

2 September 2007	Fulham (S)	6–1	AFC Team Bath (S)
14:00	Farmer; Heatherson; Jones	Report	King

2 September 2007	Newcastle United (NO)	6–3	Sheffield Wednesday (NO)
14:00	Carter; Deine; Sutcliffe; Bennett	Report	Donohoe; Hobson; Gingell

2 September 2007	Nottingham Forest (NO)	0–1	Sunderland (NO)
14:00		Report	O'Brien

=== First round ===
All played 30 September, except Liverpool vs. Leeds United and Cardiff City vs. Arsenal, both on 7 October. Charlton Athletic forfeited due to economic problems and Sunderland thus won by walkover.

30 September 2007	Aston Villa (NO)	1–4	Birmingham City (NA)
14:00	Davies	Report	Bassett; Bird; Ward

30 September 2007	Blackburn Rovers (NA)	8–0	Brighton & Hove Albion (S)
14:00	Anderton; Daniel; Penny; Williams; Dixon	Report

30 September 2007	Colchester United (S)	4–2	Tranmere Rovers (NO)
14:00	Bass; Redford	Report	Hooley; Pryce

30 September 2007	Crewe Alexandra (NO)	1–9	Chelsea (NA)
14:00	Harkin	Report	Aluko; Buet; Cooper; Larkin; Perry; J. Smith; Stoney; Susi

30 September 2007	Doncaster Rovers Belles (NA)	2–0	Crystal Palace (S)
14:00	Hopper; Owen	Report

30 September 2007	Everton (NA)	6–0	Barnet (S)
14:00	McDougall; Westwood; Unitt	Report

30 September 2007	Newquay (S)	4–3	Keynsham Town (S)
14:00	Dennett; Hegarty; Hopson; Lapham	Report	Andjelkovic; Rocha

30 September 2007	Reading Royals (S)	0–9	West Ham United (S)
14:00		Report	Crimean; Hoy; Ling; Amess

30 September 2007	Rotherham United (NO)	3–3	Portsmouth (S)
14:00	Davies; Hanson	Report	Clark; Hillier; Laws; Nash

30 September 2007	Watford (NA)	4–0	Manchester City (NO)
14:00	Burrows; Thomas	Report

30 September 2007	Stockport County (NO)	1–3	Lincoln City (NO)
14:00	Jackson	Report	Harris; Michalska; K. Smith

30 September 2007	Preston North End (NO)	2–1	Fulham (S)
14:00	Bailey; Dransfield	Report	Goal

30 September 2007	Newcastle United (NO)	0–3	Bristol Academy (NA)
14:00		Report	Bartlett; Harries; Britton

30 September 2007	Sunderland (NO)	w/o	Charlton Athletic (NA)
14:00		Report

7 October 2007	Cardiff City (NA)	0–4	Arsenal (NA)	Cwmbran
14:00		Report	Carney; Chapman; Yankey; Sanderson	Stadium: Cwmbran Stadium

7 October 2007	Liverpool (NA)	2–0	Leeds United (NA)
14:00	Jones; Foster	Report

=== Second round ===
Matches were played on the 14 and 21 October.

14 October 2007	Birmingham City (NA)	3–0	Portsmouth (S)
14:00	Archer 42'; Bassett; Horwood	Report

14 October 2007	Preston North End (NO)	3–4	Sunderland (NO)
14:00	McCrea; Dransfield	Report	Danby 61' 82'; Clarke

14 October 2007	Watford (NA)	3–2	Doncaster Rovers Belles (NA)
14:00	Hincks 43'; Lander	Report	Exley 36' (pen.)

14 October 2007	Colchester United (S)	2–3 (a.e.t.)	Liverpool (NA)
14:00	Bass 32'; T. Smith 90'	Report	Thomas; Parry; Hart 118'

14 October 2007	Chelsea (NA)	5–1	Lincoln City (NO)
14:00	E. White 40'; Rafferty 12'; Aluko; Owen	Report	Michalska 30'

14 October 2007	Blackburn Rovers (NA)	2–1	Bristol Academy (NA)
14:00	Shepherd 26'; Anderton 66'	Report	Watts 83'

21 October 2007	West Ham United (S)	1–4	Everton (NA)
14:00	Ling	Report	Williams; Kane; Handley

21 October 2007	Newquay (S)	1–11	Arsenal (NA)	Truro
14:00	Wood	Report	Yankey; Ludlow; Sanderson; Marsh; Wicks	Stadium: Truro City Stadium; Attendance: 1,200

=== Quarter-finals ===
All played on 4 November.

4 November 2007	Blackburn Rovers (NA)	2–3	Liverpool (NA)
14:00	Penny; Preston	Report	Parry

4 November 2007	Watford (NA)	3–2	Birmingham City (NA)
14:00	Lander; Daniels	Report	Bird 75'; Bassett 85' (pen.)

4 November 2007	Arsenal (NA)	3–1	Chelsea (NA)
14:00	Carney 43'; Ludlow 78'; Sanderson 84'	Report	F. White 62' (o.g.)

4 November 2007	Everton (NA)	3–0	Sunderland (NO)
14:00	Williams; Evans	Report

=== Semi-finals ===
All played 16 December.

16 December 2007	Arsenal (NA)	4–0	Liverpool (NA)	Borehamwood
14:00	Ludlow 8'; Sanderson 42'; Yankey 68'; Tracy 84'	Report		Stadium: Meadow Park

16 December 2007	Watford (NA)	1–2 (a.e.t.)	Everton (NA)
14:00	Beckett 65'	Report	J. Scott 23'; Duggan 118'

=== Final ===
In a shock result, Everton won the final with an early goal from Amy Kane, securing their first trophy since the 1997–98 FA Women's Premier League. Arsenal's defeat was their first in 58 domestic matches, a run stretching back two years to their humbling by Charlton Athletic in the 2005–06 final of the same competition.

28 February 2008
19:35

Everton	1–0	Arsenal
Kane 7'	Report

Matchroom Stadium, London
Attendance: 5,008
Referee: Matt McLaughlin

Everton	Arsenal

GK	1	(England) Danielle Hill
DF	2	(England) Becky Easton		(substituted off) 88'
DF	3	(England) Rachel Unitt
MF	4	(England) Fara Williams
DF	5	(England) Emily Westwood
DF	6	(England) Lindsay Johnson
MF	7	(England) Jody Handley (c)
MF	8	(England) Jill Scott	(yellow card) 73'
FW	9	(England) Natasha Dowie		(substituted off) 77'
MF	10	(England) Amy Kane	(yellow card) 17'
MF	11	(England) Michelle Evans
Substitutes:
MF	12	(England) Leanne Duffy
MF	14	(England) Michelle Hinnigan		(substituted on) 88'
FW	15	(England) Toni Duggan		(substituted on) 77'
MF	16	(England) Kelly McDougall
FW	17	(England) Karen Boyle
Manager:
(England) Mo Marley

GK	1	(Republic of Ireland) Emma Byrne
DF	2	(England) Alex Scott	(yellow card) 42'
MF	4	(Wales) Jayne Ludlow
DF	6	(England) Faye White (c)		(substituted off) 86'
FW	8	(England) Kelly Smith
FW	9	(England) Lianne Sanderson		(substituted off) 64'
FW	10	(Scotland) Julie Fleeting
MF	11	(England) Rachel Yankey
MF	14	(England) Karen Carney
DF	18	(England) Anita Asante
DF	23	(England) Mary Phillip
Substitutes:
DF	3	(Republic of Ireland) Yvonne Tracy
MF	7	(Republic of Ireland) Ciara Grant		(substituted on) 64'
MF	12	(England) Gemma Davison		(substituted on) 86'
GK	13	(England) Rebecca Spencer
DF	15	(England) Gilly Flaherty
Manager:
(England) Vic Akers

== See also ==
- 2007–08 FA Women's Premier League
- 2008 FA Women's Cup Final
