= 2007–08 FA Women's Cup =

Tournament details
- Country: England; Wales
- Teams: 249

Final positions
- Champions: Arsenal
- Runners-up: Leeds United
- Penalty shoot-outs do not count towards the total number of goals.

The 2007–08 FA Women's Cup was an association football knockout tournament for women's teams, held between 2 September 2007 and 5 May 2008. It was the 38th season of the FA Women's Cup and was won by Arsenal, who defeated Leeds United in the final. The tournament consisted of a preliminary round, four qualifying rounds and eight rounds of competition proper.

The competition began on 2 September 2007 when the 34 lowest–ranked teams in the tournament took part in the preliminary round.

All match results and dates from the Women's FA Cup Website.

== Preliminary round ==
All games were played on 7, 14 and 21 September 2007

Tie	Home team (tier)	Score	Away team (tier)	Att.
1	Banbury United	0–2	Brize Norton	
2	Bexhill United	0–4	Canterbury City	
3	Bolton Ambassadors	1–5	Penrith United	
4	Bury Girls & Ladies	3–1	Windscale	
5	Carterton	5–0	Aylesbury United	
6	Chichester City United	A–W	Abbey Rangers	
W/O for Abbey Rangers
7	Copsewood Coventry	15–0	Tamworth Lionesses	
8	Crowborough Athletic	1–4 (a.e.t.)	Haywards Heath Town	
9	Durham City	0–1	Team Northumbria	
10	Eastbourne Town	0–6	Rottingdean Village	
11	Kingsthorpe	0–9	Bedford	
12	Nottingham Forest	1–0	Heather St. Johns	
13	Penzance	7–1	Launceston	
14	Rayleigh Raiders	1–7	Brentwood Town	
15	Saffron Walden Town	3–2	Garston	
16	Tooting & Mitcham United	0–4	Havant & Waterlooville	
17	Worcester City	0–1	Bourne United	

== First round qualifying ==
All games were played on 16 and 23 September 2007.

Tie	Home team (tier)	Score	Away team (tier)	Att.
1	Abbey Rangers	0–6	Aldershot Town	
2	Acton Sports Club	3–1	Corinthian Casuals	
3	Arlesey Town	2–0	Kings Sports Luton	
4	Ashford	2–6	Ebbsfleet United	
5	Barking	2–0	Tring Athletic	
6	Barnsley	3–1	Ossett Albion	
7	Battersea & Wandsworth	2–0	Brentford	
8	Bedford	3–2	Kettering Town	
9	Billericay Town	2–0	Chelmsford City	
10	Blackpool Wren Rovers	4–0	Denton Town	
11	Bolton Wanderers	2–4	Liverpool Feds	
12	Bourne United	0–1 (a.e.t.)	Birmingham Athletic	
13	Bracknell Town	3–1	MK Wanderers	
14	Braintree Town	6–0	Harlow Athletic	
15	Brandon United	3–0	Lumley	
16	Brentwood Town	5–1	Saffron Walden Town	
17	Bury Girls & Ladies	4–1	Wirral	
18	Cambridge United	11–0	March Town United	
19	Cambridge University	4–0	Haverhill Rovers	
20	Canterbury City	4–1 (a.e.t.)	Rottingdean Village	
21	Carterton	2–1	Stoke Lane Athletic	
22	Chesterfield	A–W	Friar Lane & Epworth	
W/O for Friar Lane & Epworth
23	Chinnor	1–2	Burnham	
24	Copsewood Coventry	6–0	Allscott	
25	Corby Stewarts & Lloyds	12–0	Thorplands United	
26	Cullompton Rangers	8–0	St Blazey	
27	Darlington Railway Athletic	11–2	Glendale	
28	Dover Athletic	1–3	Eastbourne Borough	
29	Fairfield Villa	4–1	Rugby Town	
30	Forest Hall	1–4	Blyth Spartans	
31	Gloucester City	0–2	Oxford City	
32	Great Berry	4–2	C&K Basildon	
Abandoned after 83 mins due to serious injury – result stands
33	Hampstead	1–3	Long Lane	
34	Havant & Waterlooville	8–0	Upper Beeding	
35	Haywards Heath Town	H–W	Sheerness East	
W/O for Haywards Heath
36	Hemel Hempstead Town	0–1	Dagenham & Redbridge	
37	Henley Town	3–0	Woodley Saints	
38	Horley Town	3–3 (3–1 p)	East Preston	

Tie	Home team (tier)	Score	Away team (tier)	Att.
39	Huddersfield Town	2–1	Sheffield	
40	Huncote Sports & Social	3–3 (3–4 p)	Buxton	
41	Keighley AFC	3–5 (a.e.t.)	Morley Spurs	
42	Keynsham Town Development	1–3	Ilminster Town	
43	Kirklees	H–W	Pudsey Juniors	
W/O for Kirklees
44	Larkhall Athletic	8–0	Barnstaple Town	
45	Leighton Linslade	1–4	Daventry Town	
46	Lichfield Diamonds	H–W	AFC Telford United	
W/O for Lichfield
47	Linby CW	1–2	West Bridgford	
48	London Colney	5–0	Stevenage Borough	
49	London Women	3–2	The Comets	
50	Marlow	2–6	Beaconsfield SYCOB	
51	Newbury	11–1	Brize Norton	
52	Norwich City	3–1	Woodbridge Town	
53	Nottingham Forest	6–5	Mansfield Town	
54	Oadby Town	2–0	Shepshed Dynamo	
55	Penrith United	3–5 (a.e.t.)	Wigan	
56	Penzance	8–1	Saltash United	
57	Peterborough Sports	4–3	West Lynn	
58	Petts Wood	3–1	Dynamo North London	
59	Poole Town	5–2	Alphington	
60	Rise Park	5–1	Sandiacre Town	
61	Rolls Royce Leisure	4–2	Loughborough Foxes	
62	Royston Town	2–3	Hannakins	
63	Runwell Hospital	1–3	Hoddesdon Owls	
64	Solihull	4–1	Dudley United	
65	Staines Town	3–4	Tottenham Hotspur	
66	Stratford Town	3–1	Leamington Lions	
67	Taunton Town	6–1	Weymouth	
68	Team Northumbria	4–0	Gateshead Cleveland Hall	
69	Thurrock & Tilbury	2–2 (?–? p)	Harpenden Colts	
70	Tower Hamlets	1–3	Denham United	
71	Whitley Bay	4–1	Pelton Newfield	
72	Wingate & Finchley	3–3 (3–4 p)	Haringey Borough	
73	Winterton Rangers	3–4	Radcliffe Olympic	
74	Woking	2–2 (?–? p)	Salisbury City	
75	Wycombe Wanderers	8–0	Tetbury Town	
76	York City	6–1	Norton & Stockton Ancients	

== Second round qualifying ==
All games were played on 30 September 2007.

Tie	Home team (tier)	Score	Away team (tier)	Att.
1	Acton Sports Club	3–1	Tottenham Hotspur	
2	Aldershot Town	1–6	Horley Town	
3	Arlesey Town	4–0	Daventry Town	
4	Barking	7–2 (a.e.t.)	West	
5	Battersea & Wandsworth	0–2	Long Lane	
6	Billericay Town	0–1	Brentwood Town	
7	Birmingham Athletic	2–2 (?–? p)	Fairfield Villa	
8	Brandon United	2–3 (a.e.t.)	Blyth Spartans	
9	Brighouse Town	1–5	Barnsley	
10	Burnham	1–6	Newbury	
11	Bury Girls & Ladies	1–6	Blackpool Wren Rovers	
12	Cambridge United	0–5	Peterborough Sports	
13	Canterbury City	0–1	Ebbsfleet United	
14	Carterton	0–6	Bracknell Town	
15	Copsewood Coventry	3–1	Stratford Town	
16	Corby Stewarts & Lloyds	3–3 (?–? p)	Bedford	
17	Cullompton Rangers	6–0	Taunton Town	
18	Dagenham & Redbridge	11–0	Great Berry	
19	Darlington Railway Athletic	3–1	York City	
20	Denham United	7–0	London Women	

Tie	Home team (tier)	Score	Away team (tier)	Att.
21	Eastbourne Borough	3–1	Haywards Heath Town	
22	Harpenden Colts	0–3	Braintree Town	
23	Huddersfield Town	2–7	Morley Spurs	
24	Ilminster Town	0–3	Poole Town	
25	Liverpool Feds	3–2	Wigan	
26	London Colney	8–3	Hoddesdon Owls	
27	Norwich City	4–2	Cambridge University	
28	Nottingham Forest	1–6	Friar Lane & Epworth	
29	Oxford City	4–0	Henley Town	
30	Penzance	6–0	Larkhall Athletic	
31	Radcliffe Olympic	7–1	Oadby Town	
32	Rise Park	2–0	Buxton	
33	Salisbury City	3–1 (a.e.t.)	Havant & Waterlooville	
34	Solihull	3–3 (?–1? p)	Lichfield Diamonds	
35	Team Northumbria	0–2	Whitley Bay	
36	West Bridgford	0–8	Rolls Royce Leisure	
37	Wingate & Finchley	1–4	Petts Wood	
38	Wycombe Wanderers	A–W	Beaconsfield SYCOB	
W/O for Beaconsfield SYCOB

== Third round qualifying ==
All games were played on 7 October 2007

Tie	Home team (tier)	Score	Away team (tier)	Att.
1	Barking	1–1 (3–1 p)	Arlesey Town	
2	Barnsley	0–1	Radcliffe Olympic	
3	Birmingham Athletic	0–2	Friar Lane & Epworth	
4	Blackpool Wren Rovers	3–0	Blyth Spartans	
5	Bracknell Town	3–4	Acton Sports Club	
6	Braintree Town	1–4	Denham United	
7	Brentwood Town	2–4	London Colney	
8	Copsewood Coventry	6–1	Solihull	
9	Cullompton Rangers	3–3 (3–4 p)	Penzance	
10	Dagenham & Redbridge	2–1	Corby Stewarts & Lloyds	

Tie	Home team (tier)	Score	Away team (tier)	Att.
11	Darlington Railway Athletic	3–3 (6–7 p)	Whitley Bay	
12	Ebbsfleet United	2–0	Beaconsfield SYCOB	
13	Morley Spurs	1–0	Liverpool Feds	
14	Newbury	2–4	Long Lane	
15	Peterborough Sports	1–3	Norwich City	
16	Petts Wood	2–1 (a.e.t.)	Horley Town	
17	Poole Town	0–6	Oxford City	
18	Rolls Royce Leisure	1–4	Rise Park	
19	Salisbury City	6–1	Eastbourne Borough	

== First round proper ==
All games were scheduled for 28 October 2007.

Tie	Home team (tier)	Score	Away team (tier)	Att.
1	AFC Bournemouth	1–2	Plymouth Argyle	
2	AFC Wimbledon	5–4	Barking	
3	Blackpool Wren Rovers	2–0	Whitley Bay	
4	Bradford City	1–2	Peterlee RA	
5	Chesham United	7–1	Petts Wood	
6	Copsewood Coventry	4–0	Alfreton Town	
7	Coventry City	2–1	Leicester City Ladies	
8	Curzon Ashton	9–3	Hull City	
9	Denham United	2–2 (?–? p)	Acton Sports Club	
10	Enfield Town	3–0	Ebbsfleet United	
11	Forest Green Rovers	1–0	Southampton Saints	
12	Friar Lane & Epworth	1–6	Derby County	
13	Frome Town	2–0	Penzance	
14	Gillingham	1–0	Ipswich Town	
15	Hereford Pegasus	0–4	The New Saints & Shrewsbury Town	

Tie	Home team (tier)	Score	Away team (tier)	Att.
16	Leafield Athletic	0–7	Leicester City	
17	Leeds City Vixens	1–2 (a.e.t.)	Rochdale	
18	London Colney	1–9	Lewes	
19	Long Lane	1–5	Luton Town	
20	Loughborough Students	2–0	Rushden & Diamonds	
21	Morley Spurs	1–5	Scunthorpe United	
22	Northampton Town	4–0	Rise Park	
23	Norwich City	0–4	West Bromwich Albion	
24	Oxford City	8–1	Salisbury City	
25	Queens Park Rangers	3–1	Reading	
26	Salford	0–1	Middlesbrough	
27	Welwyn Garden City	2–0	Dagenham & Redbridge	
28	West Auckland Town	2–1	Chester City	
29	Whitehawk	1–0	Bedford Town Bells	
30	Wolverhampton Wanderers	1–3	Radcliffe Olympic	
31	Yeovil Town	3–1	Team Western	

== Second round proper ==
All games were originally scheduled for 11 and 18 November.

Tie	Home team (tier)	Score	Away team (tier)	Att.
1	Blackpool Wren Rovers	2–2 (?–? p)	West Auckland Town	
2	Chesham United	3–3 (6–5 p)	Gillingham	
3	Coventry City	2–1	Derby County	
4	Frome Town	0–1	Forest Green Rovers	
5	Lewes	1–5	Welwyn Garden City	
6	Luton Town	2–2 (3–2 p)	Enfield Town	
7	Middlesbrough	5–0	Radcliffe Olympic	
8	Northampton Town	0–4	Leicester City	
9	Peterlee RA	3–4	Rochdale	
10	Plymouth Argyle	3–1	Oxford City	
11	Queens Park Rangers	3–0	Acton Sports Club	
12	Scunthorpe United	0–4	Curzon Ashton	
13	The New Saints & Shrewsbury Town	2–3	Copsewood Coventry	
14	West Bromwich Albion	2–1	Loughborough Students	
15	Whitehawk	3–0	AFC Wimbledon	
16	Yeovil Town	4–4 (3–4 p)	Swindon Town	

== Third round proper ==
All games were originally scheduled for 2, 9 and 16 December 2007.

Tie	Home team (tier)	Score	Away team (tier)	Att.
1	AFC Team Bath	1–2	Newquay	
2	Aston Villa	2–1	West Bromwich Albion	
3	Barnet	10–2	Reading Town	
4	Brighton & Hove Albion	2–1	Welwyn Garden City	
5	Chesham United	0–5	Portsmouth	
6	Colchester United	3–1	Luton Town	
7	Copsewood Coventry	0–1	Crewe Alexandra	
8	Coventry City	0–1	Lincoln City	
9	Forest Green Rovers	3–3 (3–2 p)	Keynsham Town	
10	Leicester City	1–0	Nottingham Forest	

Tie	Home team (tier)	Score	Away team (tier)	Att.
11	Millwall Lionesses	2–1	Crystal Palace	
12	Newcastle United	1–0	Stockport County	
13	Preston North End	5–1 (a.e.t.)	Curzon Ashton	
14	Rotherham United	6–3	Rochdale	
15	Sheffield Wednesday	0–2	Middlesbrough	
16	Sunderland	5–1	Tranmere Rovers	
17	Swindon Town	1–1 (7–6 p)	Plymouth Argyle	
18	West Auckland Town	1–4	Manchester City	
19	West Ham United	5–0	Queens Park Rangers	
20	Whitehawk	1–5	Fulham	

== Fourth round proper ==
All games were originally scheduled for 6 and 13 January 2008.

6 January 2008	Arsenal (1)	11–1	Newquay (3)	Borehamwood
	Sanderson; Ludlow; Grant; Davison; Grant; Yankey; Phillip (pen.)	Report	Wood (pen.)	Stadium: Meadow Park

6 January 2008	Aston Villa (2)	0–6	Lincoln City (2)	Sutton Coldfield
		Report	Goal	Stadium: Central Ground; Attendance: 40

6 January 2008	Barnet (2)	0–9	Everton (1)	Perivale
		Report	Evans; Whelan; J. Scott; Kane; Handley; Hinnigan; Unitt	Stadium: Reynolds Field; Attendance: 120

6 January 2008	Blackburn Rovers (1)	4–1	Brighton & Hove Albion (2)	Clitheroe
	Goal	Report	Goal	Stadium: EcoGiants Stadium; Attendance: 65

6 January 2008	Bristol Academy (1)	1–1 (a.e.t.) (3–4 SO)	Leeds United (1)	Patchway
	Yorston 90'	Report	Barr 85'	Stadium: Scott Park
	Shootout
	Penalty missed Penalty scored		(penalty scored) Holtham

6 January 2008	Charlton Athletic (1)	0–3	Fulham (2)	Dartford
		Report	Heatherson; Albert 88'	Stadium: Princes Park; Attendance: 100

6 January 2008	Chelsea (1)	5–2	Middlesbrough (3)	East Molesey
	White 2', 56', 79'; Owen 77'; Susi 83'	Report	Duckling 17' (pen.), 50'	Stadium: Imber Court

6 January 2008	Crewe Alexandra (2)	0–4	Cardiff City (1)	Kidsgrove
		Report	Harding 10'; Harries 83'; Isaac	Stadium: Hollinwood Road

6 January 2008	Liverpool (1)	6–0	Forest Green Rovers (3)	Skelmersdale
	Traynor; Formston; Hart; Hastie; Jones; Foster	Report		Stadium: Community Ground

6 January 2008	Manchester City (2)	1–4 (a.e.t.)	Watford (1)	Flixton
	Goal	Report	Goal	Stadium: Valley Ground Stadium

6 January 2008	Millwall Lionesses (2)	0–1	Leicester City (3)	Carshalton
		Report	Goal	Stadium: War Memorial Sports Ground

6 January 2008	Preston North End (2)	1–3	Newcastle United (2)	Bamber Bridge
	Goal	Report	Goal	Stadium: Irongate; Attendance: 50

6 January 2008	Rotherham United (2)	3–4	Portsmouth (2)	Parkgate
	Goal	Report	Goal	Stadium: Roundwood Sports Complex; Attendance: 65

6 January 2008	Swindon Town (3)	0–5	Doncaster Rovers Belles (1)	Swindon
		Report	Heckler; Exley; Hamilton; Cantrell	Stadium: County Ground

6 January 2008	West Ham United (2)	7–0	Colchester United (2)	Harlow
	Goal	Report		Stadium: The Harlow Arena

13 January 2008	Sunderland (2)	1–4	Birmingham City (1)	South Shields
	Bronze 83'	Report	Buttler 13'; Hall 76'; Weston 85'; Bassett 90+6'	Stadium: Mariners Park

== Fifth round proper ==
All games were played on 27 January 2008.

27 January 2008	Watford (1)	3–3 (a.e.t.) (1–2 p)	Newcastle United (2)	Letchworth
	Sedgwick 30' (o.g.); Hincks 57'; Daniels 12'	Report	Hourihan 15' (o.g.); Sedgwick 82'; Twaddle 84'	Stadium: County Ground
	Penalties
	Penalty missed Penalty scored		Sedgwick (penalty scored)

27 January 2008	Chelsea (1)	1–1 (a.e.t.) (7–8 p)	Leeds United (1)	Molesey
	Edwards 112'	Report	Barr 113'	Stadium: Imber Court; Referee: M McLaughlin
	Penalties
	Penalty scored Penalty missed		(penalty scored) S. Smith

27 January 2008	Cardiff City (1)	3–2 (a.e.t.)	Doncaster Rovers Belles (1)	Barry
	Cousins; Dykes	Report	Cantoro; Hansen	Stadium: Jenner Park Stadium

27 January 2008	Blackburn Rovers (1)	4–1	Liverpool (1)	Clitheroe
	Preston; Anderton; Penny; Burke	Report	Parry	Stadium: Shawbridge

27 January 2008	Leicester City (3)	0–3	Everton (1)	Blaby
		Report	Handley; J. Scott	Stadium: Blaby Scout HQ; Attendance: 200

27 January 2008	Fulham (2)	0–2	Birmingham City (1)	Burnham
		Report	Scheuber 9', 38'	Stadium: The 1878 Stadium; Attendance: 85

27 January 2008	Arsenal (1)	8–1	West Ham United (2)	Borehamwood
	Sanderson 2', 53' (pen.); Davison 22'; Kelly Smith 35'; Phillip 40'; Yankey 41'; Carney 71'; 76' (o.g.)	Report	Puttick	Stadium: Meadow Park; Attendance: 325

27 January 2008	Lincoln City (2)	5–1	Portsmouth (2)	Collingham
	Snelson; Harris; Ward	Report	Chaplin	Stadium: Station Road; Attendance: 95

== Quarter–finals ==
4All games were played on 17 and 24 February 2008.

24 February 2008	Arsenal (1)	5–1	Birmingham City (1)	Borehamwood
14:00 BST	Fleeting 33'; Sanderson 37', 65'; A. Scott 60'; Carney 75'	Report	Hall 20'	Stadium: Meadow Park; Attendance: 230

24 February 2008	Cardiff City (1)	1–5	Leeds United (1)	Cwmbran
	Beddows	Report	Houghton; Bradley; Moore	Stadium: Cwmbran Stadium

17 February 2008	Lincoln City (2)	3–2 (a.e.t.)	Blackburn Rovers (1)	Collingham
	Harris 52', 98'; Kerry Smith 74'	Report	Anderton 27', 88'	Stadium: Collingham Sports Club; Attendance: 350

24 February 2008	Newcastle United (2)	1–3	Everton (1)	Newcastle upon Tyne
	Furness 86'	Report	Williams 12' (pen.); Unitt 16', 78'	Stadium: Coach Lane Sports Centre; Attendance: 330

== Semi–finals ==
All games were played on 16 March 2008.

16 March 2008	Everton (1)	0–0 (a.e.t.) (4–5 p)	Leeds United (1)	Southport
		Report		Stadium: Haig Avenue; Attendance: 572; Referee: Ross Joyce
	Penalties
	Dowie (penalty scored); Kane (penalty scored); Handley (penalty scored); Williams (penalty missed); Unitt (penalty scored)		(penalty scored) Emmanuel; (penalty scored) Walton; (penalty scored) Holtham; (penalty scored) Barr; (penalty scored) S. Smith

16 March 2008	Lincoln City (2)	1–5	Arsenal (1)	Lincoln
15:00 BST	Barker 34'	Report	Kelly Smith 8', 26'; Sanderson 14', 21'; Ludlow 80'	Stadium: Sincil Bank; Attendance: 2,974; Referee: Amy Rayner

== Final ==
5 May 2008
13:00 BST

Arsenal	4–1	Leeds United
Kelly Smith 54', 83'; Ludlow 59'; Sanderson 60'	Report	Clarke 69'

City Ground, Nottingham
Attendance: 24,582
Referee: Saša Ihringová (Shropshire)
