= Lenie Onzia =

Belgian footballer

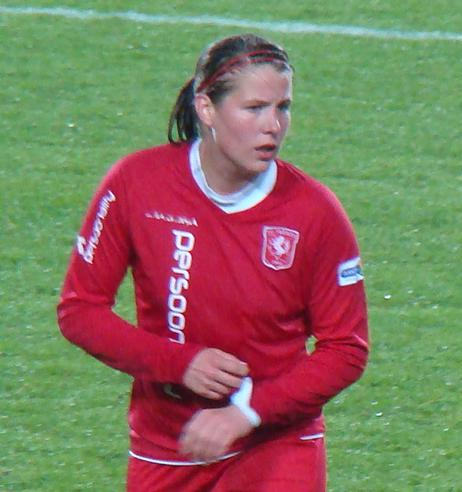

Personal information
- Date of birth: 30 May 1989 (age 37)
- Place of birth: Boechout, Belgium
- Height: 1.70 m (5 ft 7 in)
- Position: Midfielder

Youth career
- Boechout
- Kontich

Senior career*
Years	Team	Apps	(Gls)
2006–2007	Leuven	24	(17)
2007–2008	Arsenal	0	(0)
2008–2010	Twente	25	(2)
2010–2011	Venlo	21	(4)
2011–2013	Lierse	28	(7)
2015–2017	Twente	23	(3)
2017–2018	Anderlecht	0	(0)
2018–2020	Gent	40	(7)
2020–2022	OH Leuven	48	(9)

International career^{‡}
2003–2005	Belgium U-17	8	(0)
2005–2007	Belgium U-19	19	(4)
2006–2022	Belgium	62	(4)

Managerial career
- 2022–2024: Belgium U23
- 2024–2026: Belgium (assistant coach)
- 2026–: Belgium (head coach)
- * Club domestic league appearances and goals ‡ National team caps and goals as of 08 November 2026

Lenie Onzia (born 30 May 1989) is a former Belgian football midfielder. She played professionally in Belgium, England and the Netherlands.

== Club career ==
She played for FC Twente and VVV-Venlo in the Dutch Eredivisie and Arsenal FC's reserves.

She was a member of OH Leuven in the renewed Belgian Women's Super League for the 2020–2022 seasons, ending both seasons as vice-champions behind RSC Anderlecht. Onzia played her last game for OHL on 7 May 2022, during a 5–2 victory over Standard Liège where she scored the 3rd OHL goal.

== International career ==
Onzia was a member of the Belgium U-17 and U-19 squads. She made her first appearance for the Red Flames on 6 September 2006, against Scotland. She was also a member of the Euro 2017 squad.

She made the preliminary squad list for the women's EURO 2022 championship.

== Managerial career ==
At the start of 2022, Onzia helped Belgium win the Pinatar Cup in Spain for the first time, beating Russia on penalties in the final after a 0–0 draw.

After missing out on the EURO 2022 finals, Onzia ended her active playing career and joined the Belgian squad as a staff member for the rest of the tournament. She subsequently joined the Belgium U-23 staff as assistant coach and later head coach.

Since 2024, she has been part of the Red Flames staff as an assistant coach, and on 8 November 2026, she replaced Elísabet Gunnarsdóttir as head coach of the Belgian Red Flames, after Belgium failed to qualify for the 2027 FIFA Women's World Cup.

== Career statistics ==
=== International ===
As of match played 28 June 2022

List of international goals scored by Lenie Onzia
No.	Date	Venue	Opponent	Score	Result	Competition
1	5 September 2009	Câmpina, Romania	Romania	1–7	2–7	Friendly
2	19 June 2010	Stade Leburton, Tubize, Belgium	Azerbaijan	6–0	11–0	2011 FIFA Women's World Cup qualification
3	19 June 2010	Stade Leburton, Tubize, Belgium	Azerbaijan	11–0	11–0	2011 FIFA Women's World Cup qualification
4	15 June 2011	De Lenspolder Stadium, Nieuwpoort, Belgium	France	1–0	1–2	Friendly
