= Amy Kane =

English footballer (born 1986)

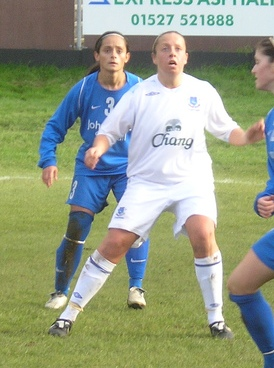
- Kane (in white) playing for Everton in 2006

Personal information
- Date of birth: 10 September 1986 (age 40)
- Place of birth: Liverpool, England
- Position: Midfielder

Senior career*
Years	Team	Apps	(Gls)
–2009	Everton		
2009–2010	Blackburn Rovers	11	(0)
2010–2014	Everton		

International career
2008	England U23		
- * Club domestic league appearances and goals

Amy Kane (born 10 September 1986) is an English former footballer who played as a midfielder. At club level, Kane played for Everton Ladies twice, and Blackburn Rovers Ladies, as well as representing England at Under-23 level.

== Club career ==
Kane joined Everton Ladies at the age of 15. She progressed to the senior side, scoring the winning goal for them in the shock 2007–08 FA Women's Premier League Cup Final win over Arsenal. When homeless Fara Williams signed for Everton, Kane's family took her in and helped her establish herself. Kane joined Blackburn Rovers Ladies in January 2009 in search of more regular first team football.

Kane returned to Everton in summer 2010 for the club's UEFA Women's Champions League campaign. On 3 August 2011, she scored the winner against Birmingham City with a 25 yard curled shot. When the 2014 campaign ended in Everton's relegation, Kane decided to retire in order to focus on her career away from football.

== International career ==
Kane represented England at Under-19, Under-21 and Under-23 levels. In April 2007 she was chosen to join the England senior side's training camp at La Manga Club.

She also represented Great Britain at the World University Games, scoring a hat-trick in four minutes in Great Britain's first group game of the 2009 tournament in Belgrade, a 10–0 win against Estonia.

== Personal life ==
Kane attended Liverpool John Moores University, on the Talented Athlete Scholarship Scheme.

In December 2015 she married former Everton team-mate Fara Williams, but they separated a short time later.

== Blackburn Rovers statistics ==
Club	Season	League		WFA Cup		Premier League Cup		County Cup		Other		Total	
Club	Season	Apps	Goals	Apps	Goals	Apps	Goals	Apps	Goals	Apps	Goals	Apps	Goals
Blackburn Rovers Ladies	2008–09	8	0	2	0	0	0	0	0	0	0	10	0
Blackburn Rovers Ladies	2009–10	6	0	0	0	2	0	1	1	0	0	9	1
Blackburn Rovers Ladies	Club Total	14	0	2	0	2	0	1	1	0	0	19	1
