= 1989–90 WFA Cup =

Tournament details
- Country: England & Wales

Final positions
- Champions: Doncaster Belles
- Runners-up: Friends of Fulham
- Penalty shoot-outs do not count towards the total number of goals.

The 1989–90 WFA Cup was an association football knockout tournament for women's teams, held between 17 September 1989 and 28 April 1990. It was the 20th season of the WFA Cup and was won by Doncaster Belles, who defeated Friends of Fulham in the final.

The tournament consisted eight rounds of competition proper.

All match results and dates from the Women's FA Cup Website.

== Group A ==
=== First round proper ===
All games were scheduled for 17 September 1989.

Tie	Home team (tier)	Score	Away team (tier)	Att.
1	Burnley	2–6	Ladyblues	
2	Leek Town	5–3	Leeside	
3	Manchester United	8–2	North End	
4	St Helens	3–0	Daresbury	
5	Wigan	7–2	Manchester City	
6	Wythenshawe	H–W	Rossendale	
Rossendale withdrew

=== Second round proper ===
All games were originally scheduled for 8 October 1989.

Tie	Home team (tier)	Score	Away team (tier)	Att.
1	Ladyblues	1–2	St Helens	
2	Wigan	5–2	Leek Town	
3	Wythenshawe	0–3	Manchester United	

== Group B ==
=== First round proper ===
All games were scheduled for 17 September 1989.

Tie	Home team (tier)	Score	Away team (tier)	Att.
1	Bristol	9–0	Exeter Rangers	
2	Frome	2–2 (a.e.t.)	Cardiff	
replay	Cardiff	5–0	Frome	
3	Plymouth Pilgrims	1–4	Taunton Trident	
4	Truro City	6–0	Crewkerne	

=== Second round proper ===
All games were originally scheduled for 8 October 1989.

Tie	Home team (tier)	Score	Away team (tier)	Att.
1	Bristol	7–0	Taunton Trident	
2	Truro City	1–0	Cardiff	

== Group C ==
=== First round proper ===
All games were scheduled for 17 September 1989.

Tie	Home team (tier)	Score	Away team (tier)	Att.
1	Birmingham City	3–1	Wolverhampton	
2	Holly Lane	4–8	Abbeydale	
3	Leicester	1–3	Crewe	
4	Villa Aztecs	2–3	Preston Rangers	
Bye: Bennetts Bank, Droitwich St. Andrews

=== Second round proper ===
All games were originally scheduled for 8 October 1989.

Tie	Home team (tier)	Score	Away team (tier)	Att.
1	Birmingham City	11–0	Bennetts Bank	
2	Crewe	4–3 (a.e.t.)	Abbeydale	
3	Preston Rangers	10–1	Droitwich St. Andrews	

== Group D ==
=== First round proper ===
All games were scheduled for 17 September 1989.

Tie	Home team (tier)	Score	Away team (tier)	Att.
1	Doncaster Town	2–4	Filey Flyers	
2	Leeds	3–1	Whitehouse Rovers	
3	Notts County	2–0	Chesterfield	
4	Oakland Rangers	0–3	Rainworth Miners Welfare	
5	Sheffield	0–3	Cleveland Spartans	
Bye: Whitley Bay

=== Second round proper ===
All games were originally scheduled for 8 October 1989.

Tie	Home team (tier)	Score	Away team (tier)	Att.
1	Filey Flyers	10–0	Notts County	
2	Leeds	0–4	Whitley Bay	
3	Rainworth Miners Welfare	1–3	Cleveland Spartans	

== Group E ==
=== First round proper ===
All games were scheduled for 17 September 1989.

Tie	Home team (tier)	Score	Away team (tier)	Att.
1	Basildon	1–10	Spondon Leisure Centre	
2	Ipswich Town	4–1	Leyton Orient	
3	Romford	3–1	SJP Chelmsford	
Bye: Canary Rangers, Pye

=== Second round proper ===
All games were originally scheduled for 8 October 1989.

Tie	Home team (tier)	Score	Away team (tier)	Att.
1	Canary Rangers	0–6	Ipswich Town	
2	Romford	8–1	Pye	
Bye: Spondon Leisure Centre

== Group F ==
=== First round proper ===
All games were scheduled for 17 September 1989.

Tie	Home team (tier)	Score	Away team (tier)	Att.
1	District Line	9–0	Hackney	
2	Maidstone Tigresses	7–1	Tottenham	
3	Maidstone United	2–1	Chelsea	
4	Sutton	A–W	Arsenal	
Sutton disqualified
5	Walton & Hersham	2–1	Reigate	
6	Watford	H–W	Brentford	
Brentford disqualified
Bye: Spurs

=== Second round proper ===
All games were originally scheduled for 8 October 1989.

Tie	Home team (tier)	Score	Away team (tier)	Att.
1	Maidstone Tigresses	4–2 (a.e.t.)	Spurs	
2	Maidstone United	3–1 (a.e.t.)	Walton & Hersham	
3	Watford	0–4	Arsenal	
Bye: District Line

== Group G ==
=== First round proper ===
All games were scheduled for 17 September 1989.

Tie	Home team (tier)	Score	Away team (tier)	Att.
1	Broadbridge Heath	3–1	Bournemouth	
2	C&C Sports	H–W	Ashford Town	
Ashford Town withdrew
3	Cove Krakatoa	6–0	Leeds Fastmet	
4	Saltdean United	0–5	Hassocks Beacon	
5	Solent	4–2	Worthing	
Bye: Handcross, Hightown

=== Second round proper ===
All games were originally scheduled for 8 October 1989.

Tie	Home team (tier)	Score	Away team (tier)	Att.
1	Cove Krakatoa	5–3	Hassocks Beacon	
2	Handcross	0–15	Solent	
3	Hightown	0–4	Broadbridge Heath	
Bye: C&C Sports

== Group H ==
=== First round proper ===
All games were scheduled for 17 September 1989.

Tie	Home team (tier)	Score	Away team (tier)	Att.
1	Leighton Linslade	0–4	Hertford Town	
2	Newbury	1–0	Hemel Hempstead	
3	Nino Ladies Bracknell	3–1	Stevenage	
4	Swindon Spitfires	1–1 (a.e.t.)	Oxford & County	
replay	Oxford & County	2–0	Swindon Spitfires	
Bye: Milton Keynes

=== Second round proper ===
All games were originally scheduled for 8 October 1989.

Tie	Home team (tier)	Score	Away team (tier)	Att.
1	Hertford Town	3–5	Newbury	
2	Milton Keynes	1–4	Oxford & County	
Bye: Nino Ladies Bracknell

== Third round proper ==
All games were originally scheduled for 5 November 1989.

Tie	Home team (tier)	Score	Away team (tier)	Att.
1	Bronte	2–0	Whitley Bay	
2	Cleveland Spartans	1–3	Leasowe Pacific	
3	District Line	5–0	Broadbridge Heath	
4	Doncaster Belles	4–0	Red Star Southampton	
5	Friends of Fulham	4–0	Crewe	
6	Maidstone Tigresses	1–0	Notts Rangers	
7	Maidstone United	3–1	C&C Sports	
8	Manchester United	1–4	Ipswich Town	
9	Millwall Lionesses	18–0	Cove Krakatoa	
10	Newbury	3–4	Birmingham City	
11	Oxford & County	0–1	Wigan	
12	Romford	2–5	Preston Rangers	
13	Scarborough	0–7	Arsenal	
14	Solent	0–4	St Helens	
15	Spondon Leisure Centre	1–0	Bristol	
16	Truro City	2–4	Nino Ladies Bracknell	

== Fourth round proper ==
All games were originally scheduled for 3 December 1989.

Tie	Home team (tier)	Score	Away team (tier)	Att.
1	Arsenal	4–0	Wigan	
2	Bronte	1–2	Friends of Fulham	
3	District Line	1–0	Maidstone Tigresses	
4	Doncaster Belles	3–2	Millwall Lionesses	
5	Leasowe Pacific	7–0	Birmingham City	
6	Maidstone United	1–1	St Helens	
Original match postponed at half–time at 1–1 due to fog
replay	St Helens	4–1	Maidstone United	
7	Nino Ladies Bracknell	3–3 (aet)	Preston Rangers	
replay	Preston Rangers	H–W	Nino Ladies Bracknell	
Walkover for Preston Rangers
8	Spondon Leisure Centre	2–4	Ipswich Town	

== Quarter–finals ==
All games were played on 4, 10 and 11 March 1990.

Tie	Home team (tier)	Score	Away team (tier)	Att.
1	Arsenal	0–4	Friends of Fulham	
2	Doncaster Belles	5–0	Leasowe Pacific	
3	Preston Rangers	2–1	Ipswich Town	
4	St Helens	2–1 (a.e.t.)	District Line	

== Semi–finals ==
All games were played on 21 April 1990 at Millwall.

Tie	Home team (tier)	Score	Away team (tier)	Att.
1	Doncaster Belles	7–0	St Helens	
2	Preston Rangers	0–3	Friends of Fulham	

== Final ==
28 April 1990

Doncaster Belles	1–0	Friends of Fulham
Coultard 61'	Report

Baseball Ground, Derby
Attendance: 3,111
Referee: D.T. Phillips (Barnsley)
