= Gill Sayell =

English footballer

Personal information
- Full name: Gillian Sayell
- Date of birth: 26 October 1956 (age 70)
- Place of birth: Aylesbury, England
- Height: 4 ft 10 in (1.47 m)
- Position: Winger

Youth career
- Bedgrove Dynamos

Senior career*
Years	Team	Apps	(Gls)
- Thame
- Aylesbury
1987–1990	Arsenal		

International career
1971	British Independents		
- * Club domestic league appearances and goals

Gillian Sayell (born 1957) is an English former footballer.

Sayell had four brothers and learned to play football playing alongside boys, sometimes pretending to be a boy herself under the alias Billy. At around 12 years old Sayell joined a strong Thame Ladies team which featured Wendy Owen and Margaret McGroarty.

After playing for Thame in a 5–3 friendly win over Fodens in June 1971, Sayell was scouted by Harry Batt to play for his "British Independents" team. She played for Batt's team at the 1971 Women's World Cup in Mexico, but was given a 3-month ban by the Women's Football Association upon her return, for playing in "unsanctioned" competition.

In around 1976 the Thame team broke up and Sayell was part of a faction who formed a new team in Aylesbury, coached by her father Bob Sayell. In 1987 Bob emigrated to Menorca and the managerless Aylesbury team were taken over by Arsenal to form the new Arsenal Ladies.

Vic Akers deployed Sayell as a sweeper and she was named the club's Player of the Season in their inaugural 1987–88 campaign (under her married name of Gill Bordman). Sayell continued playing for Arsenal Ladies until an anterior cruciate ligament injury brought about her playing retirement at the age of 34.

In 2025 Sayell was featured on Extraordinary Portraits where her likeness was painted by David James.
