= Mary Phillip =

English footballer

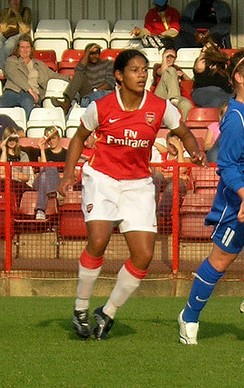
- Phillip playing for Arsenal in October 2006

Personal information
- Full name: Mary Rose Phillip
- Date of birth: 14 March 1977 (age 49)
- Place of birth: Peckham, England
- Height: 5 ft 5 in (1.65 m)
- Position: Defender

Team information
- Current team: Peckham Town (manager)

Youth career
- Lambeth Ladies

Senior career*
Years	Team	Apps	(Gls)
1992–2000	Millwall Lionesses		
2000–2004	Fulham		
2004–2008	Arsenal		
2008	Chelsea		

International career
1996–2008	England	65	(0)

Managerial career
- 2019–: Peckham Town
- * Club domestic league appearances and goals

Mary Rose Phillip (born 14 March 1977) is an English football manager and former player, who manages men's Kent County League team Peckham Town.

A versatile player, she played in all four positions at the back and also in midfield. Phillip captained England, the first black player to captain an England women's international football team, and until 2011, was the only player to represent the country in two World Cup squads. During her playing career, she had 65 international caps. She enjoyed a successful club career with Millwall Lionesses, Fulham Ladies, Arsenal Ladies and Chelsea Ladies, and won the FA Women's Cup with three different clubs. After retiring as a player in 2008, she became a team coach and manager and in 2020, became the first female manager of a cup-winning men's senior side.

In October 2024, Phillip was inducted into the English Football Hall of Fame.

== Early life ==
Phillip was born and raised in Peckham and is biracial. Her father was a bus driver of Saint Lucian descent, and her mother was a primary school teacher of Irish origin. Phillip was keen on football from childhood.

== Club career ==
Phillip joined Millwall Lionesses as a 12-year-old and later won the FA Women's Cup with them in 1997 when Millwall beat Wembley. She then moved to Fulham Ladies as a professional in 2000; she was one of the first 16 UK women players to turn pro. She won her second FA Women's Cup, and first with Fulham in 2002 when Fulham beat Doncaster Belles 2–1 at Selhurst Park.

Phillip became the club captain at Fulham, for whom she lifted the FA Women's Cup in front of 10,000 fans and 1.9m viewers on BBC television in May 2003, the season Fulham completed the treble.

She played for Arsenal Ladies in central defence and was with the club for four years after joining from Fulham in July 2004. Her central defensive partnership with Faye White played a part in Arsenal's unprecedented success, both domestically and in Europe. She would go on to win the FA Women's Cup again with Arsenal in 2006, 2007 and 2008. At the end of the 2007–08 season, it was announced that Phillip would be leaving Arsenal. She later joined Chelsea Ladies in time for the start of the 2008–09 season. In October 2008, Phillip retired from football at the age of 31.

== International career ==
Phillip made her England debut whilst with Millwall Lionesses, playing in the same team as future national coach Hope Powell in 1996. As an 18-year-old, she received an unexpected call-up to the squad that played in the 1995 FIFA Women's World Cup; she was pregnant at the time. Phillip won six caps, then spent four years out of the international set-up while having her two sons.

She returned in early 2002 and subsequently captained England in two international friendlies against Sweden in February 2006, when Faye White was absent with an ankle injury. She again captained England in the absence of White, who suffered a cruciate ligament injury at the start of the 2006–07 season, when they overcame France to secure passage to the 2007 FIFA Women's World Cup. She was the first black player to captain an England women's international side.

After being named in the squad for China, Phillip became the first English player to feature in two World Cup squads. In February 2008, Phillip was one of a record eight Arsenal players who started in England's 2–1 friendly win over Norway. She won a total of 65 caps for the national side.

She was allotted 114 when the FA announced their legacy numbers scheme to honour the 50th anniversary of England's inaugural international.

== Managerial career ==
After her retirement as a player in 2008, Phillip became a coach, completing her A licence in the 2010s. In 2019, she became manager of Peckham Town, her local club, where she had coached first the Under-18s and then the senior squad; in 2020, they won the London Senior Trophy, the club's first cup win and the first for a senior men's side with a female manager. In 2021, she assisted Lydia Bedford in coaching the England women's Under-18 team as part of the Elite Coach Placement Programme.

== Personal life ==
Phillip has two sons and two daughters. She has multiple sclerosis, diagnosed in 2017.

== Honours ==
=== Player ===
Millwall Lionesses

- FA Women's Cup: 1996–97
- FA Women's Premier League Cup: 1996–97

Fulham

- FA Women's Premier League: 2002–03
- FA Women's Cup: 2001–02, 2002–03
- FA Women's Premier League Cup: 2000–01, 2001–02, 2002–03
- Women's FA Community Shield: 2002–03, 2003–04

Arsenal

- FA Women's Premier League: 2004–05, 2005–06, 2006–07, 2007–08
- UEFA Women's Cup: 2006–07
- FA Women's Cup: 2004–05, 2005–06, 2006–07, 2007–08
- FA Women's Premier League Cup: 2004–05, 2006–07
- Women's FA Community Shield: 2005–06

=== Manager ===
Peckham Town

- London Senior Trophy: 2019–20
