= Home Counties League =

Women's football league in England

The Home Counties League was a women's football league which was the highest level of play for teams in South East England.

The league was established in 1970, on the initiative of the Amersham Angels team, which left the South East of England League. Other founding members included the Crystal Palace, Queen's Park Rangers, and Swindon Spitfires Women. Reading Ladies and Red Star Southampton joined for the 1971/72 season, with Southampton becoming the league's dominant team, its main challenger in the early years being Thame Ladies. In later years, Southampton moved to the Southern Regions League, and Friends of Fulham became a leading club in the league, winning the Home Counties League Cup on six consecutive occasions.

For the 1991/92 season, the Women's Football Association reorganised the league system, with top teams moving to the new WFA National League Premier Division, and most others to the new Southern Region Women's Football League.
