= 2008 FA Women's Cup final =

English football cup final

2008 FA Women's Cup Final
- The match programme cover
- Event: 2007–08 FA Women's Cup
Arsenal	Leeds United
4	1
- Date: 5 May 2008
- Venue: City Ground, Nottingham
- Player of the Match: Carly Telford (Leeds United)
- Referee: Saša Ihringová (Shropshire)
- Attendance: 24,582

The 2008 FA Women's Cup Final was the 38th final of the FA Women's Cup, England's primary cup competition for women's football teams. It was the 15th final to be held under the direct control of the Football Association (FA). The final was contested between Arsenal and Leeds United at the City Ground on 5 May 2008. It was Arsenal's third successive FA Cup triumph, their ninth in total and their 29th major trophy in just 16 years. Leeds made their second final appearance, after losing 5–0 to Arsenal in 2006. The match was attended by a crowd of 24,582.

== Match ==
=== Summary ===
Having just sealed their fifth successive Premier League title and having suffered only one defeat in more than two years of domestic football, Arsenal came into the game as favourites. Arsenal dominated from start to finish, with Smith and Sanderson both drawing saves from Carly Telford in the opening 10 minutes. Karen Carney was also denied from close range on the quarter-hour mark, while Alex Scott was thwarted by a double save by Telford after Smith had put her through with a defence-splitting pass midway through the first half. Leeds' Amanda Barr scored after 32 minutes, but her lob was ruled out for off-side.

Eight minutes after the restart, striker Kelly Smith scored the opener with a 12-yard shot. Six minutes later, Ludlow poked home a 59th-minute effort from close range and within 60 seconds Lianne Sanderson's deflected effort flew into the net as well. Leeds' right-winger Jessica Clarke scored with 20 minutes remaining, but Arsenal quickly regained the initiative and almost extended their lead on 72 minutes when Ludlow's header was cleared off the line by Amanda Barr, and Julie Fleeting also came close with 10 minutes to go. Smith tapped in her second goal seven minutes from time after Fleeting's shot had rebounded off a post.

=== Details ===
5 May 2008
13:00 BST

Arsenal	4–1	Leeds United
K. Smith 54', 83'; Ludlow 59'; Sanderson 60'	Report	Clarke 69'

City Ground, Nottingham
Attendance: 24,582
Referee: Saša Ihringová (Shropshire)

Arsenal	Leeds United

GK	1	(Republic of Ireland) Emma Byrne
DF	2	(England) Alex Scott
DF	6	(England) Faye White (c)
DF	18	(England) Anita Asante
DF	23	(England) Mary Phillip
MF	4	(Wales) Jayne Ludlow
MF	7	(Republic of Ireland) Ciara Grant	(substituted off) 74'
RW	14	(England) Karen Carney
CAM	8	(England) Kelly Smith
LW	11	(England) Rachel Yankey	(substituted off) 74'
FW	9	(England) Lianne Sanderson	(substituted off) 74'
Substitutes:
DF	3	(Republic of Ireland) Yvonne Tracy	(substituted on) 74'
MF	12	(England) Gemma Davison	(substituted on) 74'
FW	10	(Scotland) Julie Fleeting	(substituted on) 74'
GK	13	(Jamaica) Rebecca Spencer
DF	15	(England) Gilly Flaherty
Manager:
(England) Vic Akers

GK	1	(England) Carly Telford
DF	9	(England) Steph Houghton
DF	2	(England) Sophie Bradley-Auckland
DF	5	(England) Jess Wright (c)		(substituted off) 86'
DF	17	(England) Alex Culvin	Yellow card	(substituted off) 80'
MF	18	(England) Sophie Walton
MF	14	(England) Jade Moore		(substituted off) 60'
MF	6	(England) Katie Holtham
FW	12	(England) Jessica Clarke
FW	16	(England) Amanda Barr
FW	8	(England) Sue Smith
Substitutes:
DF	23	(England) Gemma Bonner		(substituted on) 86'
MF	20	(England) Olivia Thackray		(substituted on) 80'
DF	19	(England) Mel Sutcliffe		(substituted on) 60'
GK	13	(Northern Ireland) Emma Higgins
DF	21	(Northern Ireland) Ashley Hutton
Manager:
(England) Rick Passmoor

Player of the match
Carly Telford (Leeds United)

Assistant referees:
Sian Massey-Ellis
H. Fulcher-Ward
Fourth official:
N. Walker

Match rules

- 90 minutes.
- 30 minutes of extra-time if necessary.
- Penalty shoot-out if scores still level.
- Five named substitutes.
- Maximum of three substitutions.
