= Arsenal W.F.C. Academy =

- Full name: Arsenal Women Football Club Academy
- Nickname: Hale End
- Ground: Vauxhall Road
- Capacity: 3,152 (300 seated)
- Owner: Kroenke Sports & Entertainment
- Head coach: Thomas Baldwin
Home colours	Away colours	Third colours

Arsenal Women Football Club Academy (Arsenal W.F.C. Academy) is the youth academy of Arsenal Women Football Club. The academy operates for girls from 9 to 21 years old.

== History ==
Arsenal Women's Academy started as a community programme in the late 1980s, when the club decided to develop a youth training scheme for 16- to 18-year-old girls who were interested in playing football. This scheme meant girls could play football full-time for two years, fully funded by a government training scheme.

Arsenal's Head of Community, Freddie Hudson MBE, is still involved with the academy setup and has helped to develop the pathway for girls in the North London communities into the current setup as it currently stands.

The academy has won three FA Girls Youth Cups in addition to other trophies lifted altogether.

Ahead of the 2023–24 season, Arsenal were one of 16 football clubs awarded a Category 1 Professional Game Academy License (PGAs). The PGAs replaced what were then known as FA WSL Academies.

Ahead of the 2025–26 season, it was announced that PGA sides would be competing in the Women's National League Cup for the first time, after the addition of those sides in the Women's National League Plate competition during the 2024–25 season. Along with this, there was the introduction of a group stage for the Cup: Arsenal were drawn in group K alongside Loughborough Lightning, Northampton Town and Rugby Borough. Arsenal's PGA side placed fourth in their group after losses to Northampton Town and Rugby Borough, and a last minute win against Lougborough Lightning, meaning that they did not advance to the knockout rounds of either the Plate or Cup competitions.

== Players ==
=== Under-21s ===
As of 8 August 2026

Note: Flags indicate national team as defined under FIFA eligibility rules; some limited exceptions apply. Players may hold more than one non-FIFA nationality.

No.	Pos.	Nation	Player
45	DF	ENG	Helen "Nelly" Duncan
46	DF	ENG	Lois Hazell
47	MF	ENG	Ellie Beels
48	FW	ENG	Phoebe De Bohan
50	FW	ENG	Abi Conway
52		ENG	Lily Farrington
53	GK	ENG	Amy Liddiard
54	MF	ENG	Poppy Salmon
55	FW	ENG	Kyri Teer-Hutchins
56	FW	ENG	Abigail Chipperfield
57	FW	ENG	Freya Woods

No.	Pos.	Nation	Player
58	GK	ENG	Chiemela Ude
60	FW	ENG	Mia Dixon
61	FW	ENG	Cairo Antoine-Eva
62	GK	WAL	Jessica Bryan
63	GK	ENG	Daisy Sherrin
64	DF	ENG	Amelia "Millie" Marriott
66	MF	ENG	Victoria Chitham
67	MF	ENG	Bryony Brodie
68	DF	ENG	Annabelle Tang
70	DF	ENG	Isabella Cowley

=== Academy Development Registration ===
Academy Development Registration (ADR) loans were introduced during the 2025-26 football season, replacing the older dual registration loan scheme. Former young Arsenal defender Niamh Peacock became the first player to sign an ADR loan in the WSL2 in January 2026 when she signed for Portsmouth FC.

Note: Flags indicate national team as defined under FIFA eligibility rules; some limited exceptions apply. Players may hold more than one non-FIFA nationality.

No.	Pos.	Nation	Player
53	GK	ENG	Amy Liddiard (at London Bees until 30 June 2027)
67	MF	ENG	Bryony Brodie (at Norwich City until 30 June 2027)

== Management and Staff ==
=== Current staff ===
As of 23 April 2026

Position	Name
Player Pathway Manager	Pauline MacDonald
Head Coach	Thomas Baldwin
ETC Under-19s Head Coach	Hannah Coote
PDP Lead & Under-21s Head Coach	John Hal Bitting
YDP Lead & Under-16s Head Coach	Jon Whittingham
Foundation Phase Lead	Ana Popov
Academy Goalkeeping Lead	Tom Gallin
Academy Strength & Conditioning Coach	Sam Hawkes
Academy Player Care Lead	Grace Brooks

== Academy Graduates ==
This is a list of former Arsenal W.F.C. Academy players who have gone on to represent Arsenal at senior level. Players who are still at Arsenal, or play at another club on loan from Arsenal, are highlighted in bold.

Updated 16 July 2026

Left Academy before 2000

- (England) Alex Scott
- (England) Casey Stoney

Left Academy between 2000 and 2009

- (England) Anita Asante
- (England) Lianne Sanderson
- (Jamaica) Drew Spence
- (England) Ellen White
- (England) Gemma Davison
- (England) Gilly Flaherty
- (Jamaica) Rebecca Spencer
- (Scotland) Vaila Barsley
- (England) Laura Coombs
- (Netherlands) Renée Slegers
- (Wales) Sarah Wiltshire
- (England) Lauren Bruton
- (Wales) Hayley Ladd

Left Academy between 2010 and 2019

- (Republic of Ireland) Cherelle Khassal
- (Wales) Angharad James
- (Republic of Ireland) Lily Agg
- (Jamaica) Jade Bailey
- (England) **Leah Williamson**
- (Jamaica) Vyan Sampson
- (England) **Taylor Hinds**
- (England) **Chloe Kelly**
- (England) **Lotte Wubben-Moy**
- (Wales) Anna Filbey
- (England) Lauren James
- (Jamaica) Paige Bailey-Gayle
- (Mexico) Silvana Flores

Left Academy between 2020 and 2029

- (England) Ruby Mace
- (England) Araya Dennis
- (England) Teyah Goldie
- (England) Naomi Williams
- (England) **Michelle Agyemang**
- (England) Freya Godfrey
- (England) **Katie Reid**
- (England) **Sophie Harwood**

== Honours ==
- FA Girls Youth Cup: 2015, 2016, 2026
- FA Girls League Cup: 2016
- FA Girls' England Talent Pathway League (Under 16): 2022-23 (Invincible season)
- Blue Stars/Fifa Youth Cup: 2024
- PGA Southern League: 2024, 2025
- PGA League Division One: 2024–25, 2025–26
- Capital Women's Senior Cup: 2022–23, 2024-25
