= 1997–98 Arsenal L.F.C. season =

English women's football club season

Arsenal Ladies
1997–98 season
- Chairman: Peter Hill-Wood
- Manager: Terry Howard
- Stadium: Hayes Lane
- Premier League: Second Place
- FA Cup: Winners
- Premier League Cup: Winners
- London County Cup: Runners Up
- Biggest win: 12–0 (vs Canary Racers (A), FA Cup, 11 January 1998); 12–0 (vs Clapton (A), London County Cup, 08 October 1997)
- Biggest defeat: 1–3 (vs Everton (A), Premier League, 16 November 1997)
Home colours	Away colours

The 1997–98 season was Arsenal Ladies Football Club's 11th season since forming in 1987. The club participated in the National Division of the FA Women's Premier League, finishing in second place, behind Everton, who lifted the League title after Arsenal could only draw 3–3 with Croydon. They won the Premier League Cup and the FA Cup by defeating Croydon in both finals, but lost to Millwall in the London County Cup Final.

Terry Howard took over as first team coach of the team at the start of the season after Vic Akers took up the job of kit manager with the Arsenal Men's Team, whilst also becoming general manager for the women's team. However, Terry resigned after just one season, citing 'circumstances' which 'dictated that he leave the club at the end of the season'.

== Squad information & statistics ==
=== First team squad ===
Name	Date of birth (age)	Since	Signed from
Goalkeepers
(England) Lesley Higgs	25 October 1965 (aged 32)	1997	(England) Wembley
(England) Sarah Reed	12 May 1980 (aged 18)	1996	(England) Wembley
(Australia) Sara King	1972 (aged 25)	1996	(United States) Mount Ida College
Defenders
(England) Kirsty Pealling	14 April 1975 (aged 23)	1987	(England) Arsenal Academy
(England) Faye White	2 February 1978 (aged 20)	1996	(England) Three Bridges
(England) Clare Wheatley	4 February 1971 (aged 27)	1995	(England) Chelsea
(England) Carol Harwood	1 December 1965 (aged 32)	1997	(England) Wembley
(England) Kim Jerray-Silver	6 October 1977 (aged 20)	1996	(England) Wembley
(England) Jenny Canty	22 March 1976 (aged 22)	1991	(England) Limehouse
(England) Vicki Slee	9 March 1973 (aged 25)	1991	(England) Millwall Lionesses
(England) Michelle Curley	30 April 1972 (aged 26)	1988	(England) Arsenal Academy
(England) Kelley Few	17 October 1971 (aged 26)	1991	(England) Romford
(Republic of Ireland) Tammy Scrivens	11 August 1978 (aged 19)	1997	(England) Mill Hill United
(England) Jo Moruzzi	16 May 1981 (aged 17)	1995	(England) Arsenal Academy
(England) Amy Lamont	5 May 1974 (aged 24)	1989	(England) Arsenal Academy
(England) Carly Cruickshank		1992	(England) Limehouse
Midfielders
(England) Sian Williams (c)	2 February 1968 (aged 30)	1990	(England) Millwall Lionesses
(England) Tina Mapes	21 January 1971 (aged 27)	1997	(England) Croydon
(England) Emma Coss	9 May 1979 (aged 19)	1992	(England) Arsenal Academy
(England) Linda Watt	19 May 1973 (aged 25)	1995	(England) Watford
(England) Beth Lovell	12 January 1980 (aged 18)	1995	(England) Arsenal Academy
(Romania) Maria Ward	13 February 1975 (aged 23)	1997	(England) Arsenal Academy
(England) Sharon Barber	27 May 1969 (aged 29)	1988	(England) Tottenham
Sam Fisher		1997	(England) Arsenal Academy
(New Zealand) Robyn Davies-Patrick	29 August 1975 (aged 22)	1996	
Forwards
(England) Marieanne Spacey	13 February 1966 (aged 32)	1993	(England) Wimbledon
(England) Rachel Yankey	1 December 1979 (aged 18)	1996	(England) Mill Hill United
(England) Natasha Daly	29 March 1979 (aged 19)	1996	(England) Mill Hill United
(England) Ellen Maggs	16 February 1983 (aged 15)	1997	(England) Arsenal Academy
(England) Nina Downham	31 December 1980 (aged 17)	1998	(England) Millwall Lionesses
(England) Sheuneen Ta	21 July 1985 (aged 12)	1997	(England) Arsenal Academy
(England) Emma Hastings	24 November 1977 (aged 20)	1995	(England) Dunstable
(England) Yvette Rean	11 April 1969 (aged 29)	1995	(England) Watford
(England) Liz Benham	1975 (aged 22)	1996	(England) Croydon
(United States) Kara Lee Reynolds	1972 (aged 26)	1996	(United States) Texas Lightning
(England) Pat Pile	1964 (aged 34)	1989	(England) Hackney
(England) Emma Burke	1975 (aged 23)	1995	(England) Oxford University

=== Appearances and goals ===
Name	PLND		FA Cup		PL Cup		LC Cup		Total	
Name	Apps	Goals	Apps	Goals	Apps	Goals	Apps	Goals	Apps	Goals
Goalkeepers
(England) Lesley Higgs	6	0	0	0	0	0	0	0	6	0
(England) Sarah Reed	11	0	5	0	5	0	3	0	24	0
(Australia) Sara King	1	0	0	0	0	0	0	0	1	0
Defenders
(England) Kirsty Pealling	18	2	5	0	5	1	2	0	30	3
(England) Faye White	16	1	4	1	5	1	1	0	26	3
(England) Clare Wheatley	0	0	0	0	0	0	0	0	0	0
(England) Carol Harwood	18	3	5	0	5	0	2	0	30	3
(England) Kim Jerray-Silver	18	2	5	0	5	0	2	0	30	2
(England) Jenny Canty	0+1	0	0	0	0	0	0	0	0+1	0
(England) Vicki Slee	18	0	5	0	5	0	2	0	30	0
(England) Michelle Curley	1	0	0	0	0+1	0	1	0	2+1	0
(England) Kelley Few	7	2	4+1	1	1+1	1	2	0	14+2	4
(Republic of Ireland) Tammy Scrivens	1+8	1	0+2	0	0+2	0	1	0	2+12	1
(England) Jo Moruzzi	0	0	0	0	0	0	1	0	1	0
(England) Amy Lamont	0	0	0	0	0	0	0	0	0	0
(England) Carly Cruickshank	0	0	0	0	0	0	1	0	1	0
Midfielders
(England) Sian Williams (c)	15	3	5	1	0	0	2	0	22	4
(England) Tina Mapes	13+1	3	4	1	3	1	2	0	22+1	5
(England) Emma Coss	3+3	0	0	0	1+2	0	0	0	4+5	0
(England) Linda Watt	2+2	0	0	0	0	0	0	0	2+2	0
(England) Beth Lovell	0	0	0	0	0	0	1	0	1	0
(Romania) Maria Ward	0	0	0	0	0	0	1	0	1	0
(England) Sharon Barber	3+4	0	0	0	1+1	0	0	0	4+5	0
Sam Fisher	0	0	0	0	0	0	1	0	1	0
(New Zealand) Robyn Davies-Patrick	0	0	0	0	0	0	0	0	0	0
Forwards
(England) Marieanne Spacey	14	14	5	9	4	5	2	0	28	28
(England) Rachel Yankey	14+1	7	5	5	5	3	1	0	25+1	15
(England) Natasha Daly	16	9	3+2	1	5	2	2	0	26+2	12
(England) Ellen Maggs	0	0	0	0	0	0	1	8	1	8
(England) Nina Downham	0+2	2	0+1	0	0	0	0	0	0+3	2
(England) Sheuneen Ta	0	0	0	0	0	0	0	0	0	0
(England) Emma Hastings	2+1	1	0+3	0	0+1	0	1	4	3+5	5
(England) Yvette Rean	0	0	0	0	0	0	0	0	0	0
(England) Liz Benham	1+1	0	0	0	0	0	1	0	2+1	0
(United States) Kara Lee Reynolds	0	0	0	0	0	0	0	0	0	0
(England) Pat Pile	0	0	0	0	0	0	0	0	0	0
(England) Emma Burke	0	0	0	0	0	0	0	0	0	0

=== Goalscorers ===
Rank	Position	Name	PLND	FA Cup	PL Cup	LC Cup	Total
1	FW	(England) Marieanne Spacey	14	9	5	0	28
2	FW	(England) Rachel Yankey	7	5	3	0	15
3	FW	(England) Natasha Daly	10	1	2	0	13
4	FW	(England) Ellen Maggs	0	0	0	8	8
5	MF	(England) Tina Mapes	3	1	1	0	5
5	FW	(England) Emma Hastings	1	0	0	4	5
7	MF	(England) Sian Williams	3	1	0	0	4
7	DF	(England) Kelley Few	2	1	1	0	4
9	DF	(England) Kirsty Pealling	2	0	1	0	3
9	DF	(England) Faye White	1	1	1	0	3
9	DF	(England) Carol Harwood	3	0	0	0	3
12	DF	(England) Kim Jerray-Silver	2	0	0	0	2
12	FW	(England) Nina Downham	2	0	0	0	2
14	DF	(Republic of Ireland) Tammy Scrivens	1	0	0	0	1
Unknown goalscorer			3	0	0	5	8
Own goal			1	0	0	0	1
Total			55	19	14	17	105

=== Clean sheets ===
Rank	Name	PLND	FA Cup	PL Cup	LC Cup	Total
1	(England) Sarah Reed	4	3	2	1	10
2	(England) Lesley Higgs	1	0	0	0	1
2	(Australia) Sara King	0	0	0	0	0
Total		5	3	2	1	11

== Transfers, loans and other signings ==
=== Transfers in ===
Announcement date	Position	Player	From club
1997	DF	(England) Carol Harwood	(England) Wembley
1997	GK	(England) Lesley Higgs	(England) Wembley
1997	MF	(England) Tina Mapes	(England) Croydon
1997	DF	(Republic of Ireland) Tammy Scrivens	(England) Mill Hill United
1998	FW	(England) Nina Downham	(England) Millwall Lionesses

=== Transfers out ===
Announcement date	Position	Player	To club
1997	MF	(England) Joanne Broadhurst	(England) Croydon
1997	DF	(Northern Ireland) Gill Wylie	(England) Croydon
1997	DF	(England) Lisa Spry	(England) Croydon
1997	FW	(England) Kelly Smith	(United States) Seton Hall Pirates
1997	FW	(Republic of Ireland) Siobhan Kane	(Republic of Ireland) Castle Rovers
1997	GK	(England) Nancy Jeffery	(England) Wembley
1997	DF	Stacey Boulter	
1997	FW	Victoria Kneller	
18 January 1998	MF	(England) Sharon Barber	(England) Croydon
3 February 1998	DF	(England) Amy Lamont	(England) Brighton & Hove Albion

== Club ==
=== Kit ===
Supplier: Nike / Sponsor: JVC

Home	Away

== Non-competitive ==
=== Mid-season friendly ===
15 March 1998	Arsenal	2–0	South Africa	Potters Bar
13:00 GMT	Downham 10'; Spacey 80'	Report		Stadium: The Lantern Stadium

== Competitions ==
=== Overall record ===
Competition	First match	Last match	Starting round	Final position	Record							
Competition	First match	Last match	Starting round	Final position	Pld	W	D	L	GF	GA	GD	Win %
FA Women's Premier League National Division	7 September 1997	10 May 1998	Matchday 1	2nd	18	12	4	2	55	22	+33	66.67
FA Women's Cup	11 January 1998	4 May 1998	Fourth round	Winners	5	5	0	0	19	3	+16	100.00
FA Women's Premier League Cup	19 October 1997	22 March 1998	First round	Winners	5	3	2	0	14	5	+9	60.00
London County Cup	20 November 1997	6 May 1998	Second round	Runners-up	3	2	0	1	17	3	+14	66.67
Total					31	22	6	3	105	33	+72	70.97

Last updated: 22 May 2026
Source: FA WPL

=== FA Women's Premier League National Division ===
==== Partial league table ====
Pos	Team	Pld	W	D	L	GF	GA	GD	Pts
1	Everton (C)	18	13	4	1	54	14	+40	43
2	Arsenal	18	12	4	2	55	22	+33	40
3	Doncaster Belles	18	12	2	4	54	18	+36	38
4	Croydon	18	10	5	3	47	14	+33	35
5	Millwall Lionesses	18	8	5	5	37	15	+22	29

Source: FA WPL
(C) Champions

==== Results summary ====
Overall								Home						Away					
Pld	W	D	L	GF	GA	GD	Pts	W	D	L	GF	GA	GD	W	D	L	GF	GA	GD
18	12	4	2	55	22	+33	40	7	2	0	31	9	+22	5	2	2	24	13	+11

==== Results by matchday ====
Matchday	1	2	3	4	5	6	7	8	9	10	11	12	13	14	15	16	17	18
Ground	H	A	A	H	H	A	A	A	A	H	H	A	A	A	H	H	H	H
Result	D	W	W	W	W	L	L	W	W	W	W	D	W	D	W	D	W	W
Position	4	2	2	1	1	3	4	4	3	3	4	3	3	3	3	3	3	2

Source: FA WPL
W = Win; D = Draw; L = Loss

==== Matches ====
7 September 1997 1	Arsenal	2–2	Everton	Bromley
14:00 BST	Spacey 40' (pen.), 75'	Report	Halfpenny; Marley 85'	Stadium: Hayes Lane; Referee: S. Lomas

14 September 1997 2	Bradford City	1–3	Arsenal	Guiseley
14:00 BST	Garside	Report	Scrivens 30'; Daly 49', 74'	Stadium: Nethermoor Park

28 September 1997 3	Tranmere Rovers	2–4	Arsenal	Heswall
14:00 BST	20'	Report	Daly 53'; Spacey 70'	Stadium: Gayton Park

5 October 1997 4	Arsenal	3–0	Liverpool	Bromley
14:00 BST	Mapes 15'; Jerray-Silver 29'; Yankey 55'	Report		Stadium: Hayes Lane; Referee: G. Pope

8 October 1997 5	Arsenal	1–0	Millwall Lionesses	Potters Bar
19:30 BST	(o.g.)	Report		Stadium: The Lantern Stadium

2 November 1997 6	Doncaster Belles	2–1	Arsenal	Armthorpe
14:00 BST	Walker 55'; Exley 89'	Report	Spacey 21'	Stadium: Welfare Stadium; Referee: P. Hagan

16 November 1997 7	Everton	3–1	Arsenal	Crosby
	Thomas 18'; Burke 44', 88'	Report	Harwood 20'	Stadium: Rossett Park

3 December 1997 8	Berkhamsted Town	1–7	Arsenal	Berkhamsted
19:45 GMT	Burton	Report	Spacey; Daly; Mapes; Yankey	Stadium: Broadwater

7 December 1997 9	Liverpool	0–2	Arsenal	Kirkby
12:00 GMT		Report	Harwood 25'; Daly 35'	Stadium: Kirkby Sports Stadium

14 December 1997 10	Arsenal	9–1	Wembley	Potters Bar
13:00 GMT	Spacey 15', 18'; Daly; Yankey; Pealling; Williams	Report	Goal	Stadium: The Lantern Stadium; Referee: Mr Sayer

18 March 1998 11	Arsenal	3–1	Berkhamsted Town	Potters Bar
20:00 GMT	Goal	Report	Goal	Stadium: The Lantern Stadium; Referee: Mr Haywood

1 April 1998 12	Millwall Lionesses	1–1	Arsenal	Bermondsey
19:45 BST	C. Hunt 70'	Report	Hastings 25'	Stadium: Surrey Docks Stadium; Referee: T. Bailey

5 April 1998 13	Wembley	1–3	Arsenal	Greenford
14:00 BST	Goal	Report	Few; Williams; Downham	Stadium: Reynolds Field; Referee: A. E. Lunn

8 April 1998 14	Croydon	2–2	Arsenal	Croydon
	Britton 43'; Broadhurst 71' (pen.)	Report	Spacey 65'; Yankey 80'	Stadium: Croydon Sports Arena

26 April 1998 15	Arsenal	5–0	Tranmere Rovers	Potters Bar
14:00 BST	Williams 14'; Mapes 30'; Daly 55'; Pealling; Downham	Report		Stadium: The Lantern Stadium; Referee: S. Lomas

30 April 1998 16	Arsenal	3–3	Croydon	Potters Bar
	Harwood; Yankey; Few 90'	Report	Broadhurst	Stadium: The Lantern Stadium; Referee: Mrs Kirkwood

8 May 1998 17	Arsenal	4–2	Bradford City	Highbury
19:00 BST	Spacey; Jerray-Silver; White	Report	Goal	Stadium: Highbury; Referee: Mr Lomas

10 May 1998 18	Arsenal	1–0	Doncaster Belles	Highbury
14:00 BST	Spacey 22'	Report		Stadium: Highbury; Referee: R. Whyte

=== FA Women's Cup ===
11 January 1998 Fourth round	Canary Racers	0–12	Arsenal	Attleborough
13:30 GMT		Report	Spacey; Yankey; Williams; Mapes; Daly	Stadium: Attleborough Town FC; Attendance: 400; Referee: N. Warnes

1 February 1998 Fifth round	Southampton Saints	0–1	Arsenal	Totton
14:00 GMT		Report	Spacey 20'	Stadium: Testwood Park

1 March 1998 Quarter-finals	Doncaster Belles	1–2 (a.e.t.)	Arsenal	Armthorpe
13:00 GMT	Jackson 90+1'	Report	Spacey 70'; White 103'	Stadium: Welfare Stadium

29 March 1998 Semi-finals	Arsenal	1–0	Millwall Lionesses	Norbiton
13:00 GMT	Yankey 78'	Report		Stadium: Kingsmeadow; Attendance: 300; Referee: J.P. Chalmers

4 May 1998 Final	Arsenal	3–2	Croydon	Bermondsey
	Spacey 17'; Yankey 52'; Pealling (yellow card) 82'; Harwood (yellow card) 85'; Few 90+3'	Report	Broadhurst 10' (pen.); Wylie (yellow card) 49'; Powell 55'; Britton (yellow card) 73'	Stadium: The Den; Attendance: 2,205; Referee: Alan Wiley

=== FA Women's Premier League Cup ===
19 October 1997 First round	Arsenal	6–2	Huddersfield Town	Bromley
14:00 BST	Mapes 13'; Spacey 37', 63', 69', 80'; Pealling 68'	Report	Mitchell 22'; Knight 24'	Stadium: Hayes Lane; Referee: S. Lomas

23 November 1997 Second round	Arsenal	2–1	Millwall Lionesses	Bromley
14:00 GMT	Spacey 68'; Daly 89'	Report	Chapman 17'	Stadium: Hayes Lane; Referee: W. Bull

21 December 1997 Quarter-finals	Arsenal	4–0	Berkhamsted Town	Potters Bar
13:30 GMT	Daly; White; Jerray-Silver	Report		Stadium: The Lantern Stadium; Referee: Mr Pope

25 January 1998 Semi-finals	Bradford City	2–2 (a.e.t.) (2–4 p)	Arsenal	Guiseley
12:30 GMT	Garside 20' (pen.), 40'	Report	Yankey 8'; Reed (red card) 20'; Few 70'	Stadium: Nethermoor Park; Referee: C Bassindale
	Penalties
	Penalty missed Penalty scored		(penalty scored) Yankey; (penalty scored) Pealling; (penalty scored) Williams; (penalty scored) Spacey

22 March 1998 Final	Arsenal	0–0 (a.e.t.) (4–3 p)	Croydon	Barnet
14:30 GMT		Report		Stadium: Underhill Stadium; Referee: Mr AJ Rock
	Penalties
	Slee (penalty missed); Williams (penalty scored); White (penalty scored); Yankey (penalty scored); Spacey (penalty scored)		(penalty scored) Broadhurst; (penalty scored) Powell; (penalty scored) Bampton; (penalty missed) Wylie; (penalty missed) Davis

=== London County Cup ===
20 November 1997 Second round	Clapton	0–12	Arsenal	Forest Gate
19:45 GMT		Report	Maggs; Hastings	Stadium: The Old Spotted Dog Ground

22 February 1998 Semi-finals	Wimbledon	1–4 (a.e.t.)	Arsenal
	Goal	Report	Goal	Referee: D. S. Beck

6 May 1998 Final	Arsenal	1–2 (a.e.t.)	Millwall Lionesses	Croydon
19:30 BST	Goal	Report	Goal	Stadium: Croydon Sports Arena; Referee: Mrs G Kirkwood

== See also ==
- List of Arsenal W.F.C. seasons
- 1997–98 in English football
