= 1996–97 Arsenal L.F.C. season =

English women's football club season

Arsenal Ladies
1996–97 season
- Chairman: Peter Hill-Wood
- Manager: Vic Akers
- Stadium: Hayes Lane
- Premier League: Winners
- FA Cup: Semi Finals
- Premier League Cup: Second Round
- London County Cup: Winners
- Biggest win: 9–0 (vs Southampton Saints (A), Premier League, 26 January 1997); 9–0 (vs Huddersfield Town (H), FA Cup, 02 February 1997)
- Biggest defeat: 0–1 (vs Doncaster Rovers Belles, Premier League (A), 16 November 1996); 0–1 (vs Wembley (N), FA Cup, 30 March 1997); 1–2 (vs Doncaster Rovers Belles (A), Premier League Cup, 24 November 1996)
Home colours	Away colours

The 1996–97 season was Arsenal Ladies Football Club's 10th season since forming in 1987. The club participated in the National Division of the FA Women's Premier League, winning their third League Title since promotion, and were also able to retain the London County Cup for a third year in a row by defeating Millwall Lionesses in the Final. However, they failed to progress in the Premier League Cup and the FA Cup, losing to Doncaster Rovers Belles and Wembley respectively.

== Squad information & statistics ==
=== First team squad ===
Name	Date of birth (age)	Since	Signed from
Goalkeepers
(England) Sarah Reed	12 May 1980 (aged 17)	1996	(England) Wembley
(England) Nancy Jeffery	18 February 1978 (aged 19)	1989	(England) Limehouse
(Australia) Sara King	1972 (aged 24)	1996	(United States) Mount Ida College
Defenders
(England) Kirsty Pealling	14 April 1975 (aged 22)	1987	(England) Arsenal Academy
(England) Faye White	2 February 1978 (aged 19)	1996	(England) Three Bridges
(England) Clare Wheatley	4 February 1971 (aged 26)	1995	(England) Chelsea
(England) Kim Jerray-Silver	6 October 1977 (aged 19)	1997	(England) Wembley
(England) Jenny Canty	22 March 1976 (aged 21)	1991	(England) Limehouse
(England) Vicki Slee	9 March 1973 (aged 24)	1991	(England) Millwall Lionesses
(England) Michelle Curley	30 April 1972 (aged 25)	1988	(England) Arsenal Academy
(England) Kelley Few	17 October 1971 (aged 25)	1991	(England) Romford
(Northern Ireland) Gill Wylie	27 August 1965 (aged 31)	1991	(England) Tottenham
(England) Jo Moruzzi	16 May 1981 (aged 16)	1995	(England) Arsenal Academy
(England) Amy Lamont	5 May 1974 (aged 23)	1989	(England) Arsenal Academy
(England) Lisa Spry	15 January 1968 (aged 29)	1988	(England) Arsenal Academy
Stacey Boulter		1996	(England) Arsenal Academy
(England) Carly Cruickshank		1992	(England) Limehouse
Midfielders
(England) Joanne Broadhurst	27 November 1967 (aged 29)	1995	(England) Doncaster Belles
(England) Sian Williams (c)	2 February 1968 (aged 29)	1990	(England) Millwall Lionesses
(England) Emma Coss	30 May 1979 (aged 18)	1992	(England) Arsenal Academy
(Republic of Ireland) Siobhan Kane	28 March 1975 (aged 22)	1996	(Republic of Ireland) Castle Rovers
(England) Linda Watt	19 May 1973 (aged 24)	1995	(England) Watford
(England) Beth Lovell	12 January 1980 (aged 17)	1995	(England) Arsenal Academy
(United States) Laura Ray	13 May 1974 (aged 23)	1996	(England) Liverpool Feds
(England) Sharon Barber	27 May 1969 (aged 28)	1988	(England) Tottenham
(New Zealand) Robyn Davies-Patrick	29 August 1975 (aged 21)	1996	
Forwards
(England) Marieanne Spacey	13 February 1966 (aged 31)	1993	(England) Wimbledon
(England) Rachel Yankey	1 December 1979 (aged 17)	1996	(England) Mill Hill United
(England) Natasha Daly	29 March 1979 (aged 18)	1996	(England) Mill Hill United
(England) Kelly Smith	29 October 1978 (aged 18)	1996	(England) Wembley
(England) Yvette Rean	11 April 1969 (aged 28)	1995	(England) Watford
(England) Emma Hastings	24 November 1977 (aged 19)	1995	(England) Dunstable
(England) Liz Benham	1975 (aged 21)	1996	(England) Croydon
(United States) Kara Lee Reynolds	1972 (aged 25)	1996	(United States) Texas Lightning
(England) Pat Pile	1964 (aged 33)	1989	(England) Hackney
(England) Emma Burke	1975 (aged 22)	1995	(England) Oxford University
Victoria Kneller	1977 (aged 19)	1996	(England) Chelmsford
(England) Naomi Poletyllo		1995	(England) Mill Hill United

=== Goalscorers ===
Rank	Position	Name	PLND	FA Cup	PL Cup	LC Cup	Total
1	MF	(England) Joanne Broadhurst	21	3	0	1	25
2	FW	(England) Marieanne Spacey	8	1	0	2	11
3	FW	(England) Kelly Smith	7	2	0	2	11
4	FW	(United States) Kara Lee Reynolds	7	1	1	0	9
4	FW	(England) Rachel Yankey	6	1	0	2	9
6	DF	(England) Faye White	3	2	1	0	6
7	DF	(England) Clare Wheatley	2	2	1	0	5
7	FW	(England) Natasha Daly	3	1	0	1	5
9	DF	(England) Kelley Few	3	1	0	0	4
10	MF	(England) Sian Williams	0	2	0	0	2
10	FW	(England) Yvette Rean	0	0	0	2	2
12	FW	(England) Emma Hastings	1	0	0	0	1
12	DF	(England) Kim Jerray-Silver	1	0	0	0	1
12	FW	(England) Liz Benham	0	1	0	0	1
Own goal			0	2	0	0	2
Total			65	19	3	10	97

=== Clean sheets ===
Rank	Name	PLND	FA Cup	PL Cup	LC Cup	Total
1	(Australia) Sara King	5	1	0	1	7
2	(England) Sarah Reed	4	1	0	1	6
3	(England) Nancy Jeffery	0	0	0	0	0
Unknown goalkeeper		2	0	0	0	4
Total		11	2	0	2	15

== Transfers, loans and other signings ==
=== Transfers in ===
Announcement date	Position	Player	From club
1996	GK	(England) Sarah Reed	(England) Wembley
1996	GK	(Australia) Sara King	(United States) Mount Ida College
1996	MF	(Republic of Ireland) Siobhan Kane	(Republic of Ireland) Castle Rovers
1996	FW	Victoria Kneller	(England) Chelmsford
1996	MF	(New Zealand) Robyn Davies-Patrick	
17 August 1996	FW	(England) Natasha Daly	(England) Mill Hill United
17 August 1996	FW	(England) Rachel Yankey	(England) Mill Hill United
17 August 1996	DF	(England) Faye White	(England) Horsham
4 September 1996	MF	(United States) Laura Ray	(England) Liverpool Feds
16 September 1996	FW	(United States) Kara Lee Reynolds	(United States) Texas Lightning
28 December 1996	FW	(England) Kelly Smith	(England) Wembley
1997	DF	(England) Kim Jerray-Silver	(England) Wembley

=== Transfers out ===
Announcement date	Position	Player	To club
1996	MF	(England) Sammy Britton	(Scotland) Cove Rangers
1996	FW	(Scotland) Michelle Sneddon	(Scotland) Cove Rangers
1996	FW	(Spain) Conchi Sánchez	Retired
1996	MF	(England) Emma Hayes	Retired
1996	FW	(England) Julie Newell	(England) Chelsea
1996	GK	(England) Kathy Simmons	(England) Langford
1996	DF	(England) Julia Brown	(England) Portsmouth
1996	FW	(England) Kelly Townshend	(England) Enfield
1996	FW	(England) Krista Yeomans	(England) Enfield
1996	FW	Carla Rose	(England) Bracknell
1996	DF	(England) Carly Cruickshank	
1996	MF	(England) Sarah Clark	
17 August 1996	GK	(Spain) Roser Serra	(Spain) Barcelona
February 1997	FW	(England) Naomi Poletyllo	(England) Wembley
February 1997	MF	(United States) Laura Ray	(United States) Finger Lakes Heartbreakers

== Club ==
=== Kit ===
Supplier: Nike / Sponsor: JVC

Home	Away

== Competitions ==
=== Overall record ===
Competition	First match	Last match	Starting round	Final position	Record							
Competition	First match	Last match	Starting round	Final position	Pld	W	D	L	GF	GA	GD	Win %
FA Women's Premier League National Division	1 September 1996	5 May 1997	Matchday 1	Winners	18	16	1	1	65	9	+56	88.89
FA Women's Cup	19 January 1997	30 March 1997	Fourth round	Semi-finals	4	3	0	1	19	3	+16	75.00
FA Women's Premier League Cup	27 October 1996	24 November 1996	First round	Second round	2	1	0	1	3	3	+0	50.00
London County Cup	22 December 1996	13 April 1997	Quarter-finals	Winners	3	3	0	0	10	3	+7	100.00
Total					27	23	1	3	97	18	+79	85.19

Last updated: 22 May 2026
Source: FA WPL

=== FA Women's Premier League National Division ===
==== Partial league table ====
Pos	Team	Pld	W	D	L	GF	GA	GD	Pts
1	Arsenal (C)	18	16	1	1	65	9	+56	49
2	Doncaster Belles	18	13	2	3	44	15	+29	41
3	Croydon	18	9	4	5	39	26	+13	31
4	Liverpool	18	9	3	6	30	16	+14	30
5	Millwall Lionesses	18	7	6	5	20	19	+1	27

Source: FA WPL
(C) Champions

==== Results summary ====
Overall								Home						Away					
Pld	W	D	L	GF	GA	GD	Pts	W	D	L	GF	GA	GD	W	D	L	GF	GA	GD
18	16	1	1	65	9	+56	49	9	0	0	36	6	+30	7	1	1	29	3	+26

==== Results by matchday ====
Matchday	1	2	3	4	5	6	7	8	9	10	11	12	13	14	15	16	17	18
Ground	A	A	H	A	H	A	H	H	A	H	A	H	A	A	H	H	H	A
Result	L	W	W	D	W	W	W	W	W	W	W	W	W	W	W	W	W	W
Position	7	1	3	5	4	3	3	3	2	2	1	1	1	1	1	1	1	1

Source: FA WPL
W = Win; D = Draw; L = Loss

==== Matches ====
1 September 1996 1	Doncaster Belles	1–0	Arsenal	Armthorpe
14:00 BST	Walker 33'	Report		Stadium: Welfare Ground; Referee: P L Wright

14 September 1996 2	Liverpool	0–2	Arsenal	Anfield
14:00 BST		Report	Broadhurst 79'	Stadium: Anfield; Referee: Mr J Bailey

22 September 1996 3	Arsenal	4–0	Ilkeston Town	Bromley
14:00 BST	Broadhurst 24' (pen.), 70'; White; Yankey	Report		Stadium: Hayes Lane; Referee: N. Copperhurst

6 October 1996 4	Wembley	1–1	Arsenal	Wembley
14:00 GMT	Ball 75'	Report	Few 61'	Stadium: Vale Farm; Referee: R. E. Webber

13 October 1996 5	Arsenal	4–2	Tranmere Rovers	Bromley
14:00 BST	Wheatley; Broadhurst; Spacey; Yankey	Report	S. Smith	Stadium: Hayes Lane; Referee: S. Perrins

20 October 1996 6	Everton	1–5	Arsenal	Crosby
	McGrady 60'	Report	Broadhurst; Hastings	Stadium: Rossett Park

3 November 1996 7	Arsenal	7–0	Southampton Saints	Bromley
13:00 GMT	Lee Reynolds; Spacey; Broadhurst; Daly	Report		Stadium: Hayes Lane; Referee: N Copperwheat

8 December 1996 8	Arsenal	3–2	Doncaster Belles	Bromley
14:00 GMT	Broadhurst 48'; Lee Reynolds 79'; Spacey 90+1'	Report	Exley 7'; Walker 24'	Stadium: Hayes Lane; Referee: N. Copperwheat

26 January 1997 9	Southampton Saints	0–9	Arsenal	Eastleigh
		Report	Broadhurst; Spacey; Lee Reynolds; White; K. Smith	Stadium: Stoneham Park

9 February 1997 10	Arsenal	3–0	Wembley	Potters Bar
	Broadhurst; K. Smith	Report		Stadium: The Lantern Stadium

23 February 1997 11	Millwall Lionesses	0–4	Arsenal	Bermondsey
14:00 GMT		Report	Few 20'; K. Smith 46'; Broadhurst 74'; Lee Reynolds 77'	Stadium: Surrey Docks Stadium; Referee: W. Bull

19 March 1997 12	Arsenal	2–1	Croydon	Potters Bar
20:00 GMT	Few; Broadhurst	Report	Bampton	Stadium: The Lantern Stadium; Referee: P. Maskell

23 March 1997 13	Ilkeston Town	0–3	Arsenal	Ilkeston
		Report	Wheatley 2'; Spacey 17'; Broadhurst	Stadium: New Manor Ground

6 April 1997 14	Croydon	0–2	Arsenal	Croydon
		Report	Yankey 25'; Spacey 75'	Stadium: Croydon Sports Arena; Referee: S.P. Lomas

20 April 1997 15	Arsenal	4–1	Everton	Edgware
14:00 BST	Broadhurst; Yankey; White	Report	Marley	Stadium: Silver Jubilee Park; Referee: H. Thomas

27 April 1997 16	Arsenal	3–0	Liverpool	Highbury
12:00 BST	K. Smith 7', 70'; Jerray-Silver 90'	Report		Stadium: Highbury

29 April 1997 17	Arsenal	6–0	Millwall Lionesses	Northwood
	K. Smith; Daly; Yankey	Report		Stadium: The Skyline Stadium

5 May 1997 18	Tranmere Rovers	0–3	Arsenal	Birkenhead
14:00 GMT		Report		Stadium: Prenton Park
Note: Walkover. Arsenal given a 3-0 win.

=== FA Women's Cup ===
19 January 1997 Fourth round	Arsenal	6–0	Barry Town	Bromley
	K. Smith; Wheatley; Daly; (o.g.)	Report		Stadium: Hayes Lane

2 February 1997 Fifth round	Arsenal	9–0	Huddersfield Town	Bromley
14:00 GMT	Broadhurst 9', 42', 57'; Wooding 11' (o.g.); Lee Reynolds 12'; Williams 29'; White 75', 87'; Benham 90+3'	Report		Stadium: Hayes Lane

6 March 1997 Quarter-finals	Ilkeston Town	2–4	Arsenal	Ilkeston
19:30 GMT	Kirk 20'	Report	Few; Williams 40'; Yankey 73'; Spacey	Stadium: New Manor Ground; Referee: R.A. Vaughan

30 March 1997 Semi-finals	Wembley	1–0	Arsenal	Borehamwood
15:00 GMT	Koch 81'	Report		Stadium: Meadow Park; Attendance: 289; Referee: N.R.W. Lewis

=== FA Women's Premier League Cup ===
27 October 1996 First round	Liverpool	1–2	Arsenal	Fairfield
	Goal	Report	Lee Reynolds 46'; Wheatley	Stadium: Merseyside Police Sports Association

24 November 1996 Second round	Doncaster Belles	2–1	Arsenal	Armthorpe
13:00 GMT	Exley 44'; Walker 50'	Report	White	Stadium: Welfare Ground

=== London County Cup ===
22 December 1996 Quarter-finals	West Ham United	0–4	Arsenal
		Report	Rean; Daly; Yankey

26 January 1997 Semi-finals	Wimbledon	3–4	Arsenal	Wimbledon
	Stansbury	Report	K. Smith 85'; Broadhurst; Spacey	Stadium: Plough Lane

13 April 1997 Final	Arsenal	2–0	Millwall Lionesses	Hendon
	Spacey 9'; Yankey 78'	Report		Stadium: Claremont Road

== Arsenal reserves ==
=== Greater London Regional Women’s League Premier Division ===
==== League table ====
Pos	Team	Pld	W	D	L	GF	GA	GD	Pts	Qualification or relegation
1	Arsenal Reserves (C)	20	18	1	1	89	21	+68	55	Moved to Reserve League
2	Chelsea	20	12	5	3	42	23	+19	41	
3	Brentford & Hampton	20	12	4	4	54	22	+32	40	
4	Tottenham Hotspur	19	13	1	5	61	34	+27	40	
5	Wembley Reserves	19	9	2	8	41	39	+2	29	Moved to Reserve League
6	Mill Hill United	19	7	3	9	33	41	−8	24	
7	Barnet	19	6	4	9	28	36	−8	22	
8	Chelmsford	20	5	4	11	27	46	−19	19	
9	Dulwich Hamlet	20	5	2	13	28	60	−32	17	
10	Newham	19	4	2	13	23	60	−37	14	
11	Wimbledon Reserves	19	0	4	15	17	61	−44	4	Moved to Reserve League
12	Hackney (R)	0	0	0	0	0	0	0	0	Club withdrew from league. All results expunged for this season. Relegation to Division Two

Source: GLPD
(C) Champions; (R) Relegated

==== Matches ====
1 September 1996	Newham	4–6	Arsenal Reserves
	Goal		Poletyllo; Canty; Hastings; Watt; Lovell

8 September 1996	Brentford & Hampton	1–6	Arsenal Reserves
	Goal	Report	Rean; Poletyllo; Hastings; Yankey; Spacey (pen.)

15 September 1996	Mill Hill United	1–3	Arsenal Reserves
	Goal		Yankey; Ray

22 September 1996	Arsenal Reserves	7–0	Wimbledon Reserves	Beckenham
	Watt; Rean; Hastings			Stadium: Commercial Union Sports Ground

29 September 1996	Wembley Reserves	1–2	Arsenal Reserves
	Goal		Ray; Kane

6 October 1996	Arsenal Reserves	7–2	Barnet	Beckenham
	Hastings; Kane; Ray; Lovell			Stadium: Commercial Union Sports Ground

13 October 1996	Dulwich Hamlet	0–3	Arsenal Reserves
			Benham; Hastings

20 October 1996	Tottenham Hotspur	7–4	Arsenal Reserves
	Fearon; Knight; Hoy; Midson; Selby; Blackmore	Report	Spacey; Kane

Arsenal Reserves	5–0	Wembley Reserves	Beckenham
Lamont; Kane; Poletyllo			Stadium: Commercial Union Sports Ground

17 November 1996	Arsenal Reserves	6–1	Chelsea	Beckenham
	Benham; Spacey; Hastings; Kane	Report	Stanghon	Stadium: Commercial Union Sports Ground

24 November 1996	Chelmsford	0–1	Arsenal Reserves
14:00 GMT			Benham

Wimbledon Reserves	1–2	Arsenal Reserves
Goal		Kane; Kneller

Arsenal Reserves	3–0	Mill Hill United	Beckenham
Pile; Benham; Kneller			Stadium: Commercial Union Sports Ground

Arsenal Reserves	4–1	Tottenham Hotspur	Beckenham
Curley 5'; Yankey; Hastings; Lovell		Goal	Stadium: Commercial Union Sports Ground

Arsenal Reserves	?–?	Newham	Beckenham
			Stadium: Commercial Union Sports Ground

23 March 1997	Arsenal Reserves	1–1	Brentford & Hampton	Beckenham
		Report		Stadium: Commercial Union Sports Ground

13 April 1997	Barnet	0–3	Arsenal Reserves	Barnet
14:00 BST		Report	Benham; Hastings	Stadium: Underhill Stadium

Arsenal Reserves	7–1	Chelmsford	Beckenham
Canty; Watt; Pile; Hastings		Goal	Stadium: Commercial Union Sports Ground

24 April 1997	Chelsea	0–2	Arsenal Reserves	Beaconsfield
		Report	Benham; Rean	Stadium: Holloways Park

=== Greater London Regional Women’s League Cup ===
Second round	Redbridge Raiders	0–9	Arsenal Reserves
			Moruzzi; Watt; Reann; Hastings; Polytello

Third round	West Ham United	0–2	Arsenal Reserves
			Hastings; Rean

23 February 1997 Quarter-finals	Arsenal Reserves	3–1	Tottenham Hotspur
	Canty; Benham; Kneller	Report	Selby

Semi-finals	Arsenal Reserves	4–1	Barnet
	Benham; Kneller; Hastings		Goal

27 April 1997 Final	Arsenal Reserves	3–0	Chelsea	Hampton
16:30 BST		Report		Stadium: Beveree; Referee: Mr Mark Ford

== Arsenal thirds ==
=== Greater London Regional Women’s League Division Four ===
==== League table ====
Pos	Team	Pld	W	D	L	GF	GA	GD	Pts
1	Arsenal Thirds (C)	15	14	0	1	87	20	+67	42
2	Tottenham Hotspur Reserves	16	10	4	2	70	20	+50	34
3	Barnet Reserves	17	9	4	4	39	24	+15	31
4	Wimbledon Thirds	18	9	2	7	42	55	−13	29
5	Redbridge Wanderers	15	6	5	4	30	24	+6	23
6	South London	16	6	3	7	41	42	−1	21
7	Queens Park Rangers Reserves	14	5	1	8	23	27	−4	16
8	Camberwell	17	4	3	10	22	48	−26	15
9	Comets	16	3	4	9	23	37	−14	13
10	Hackney "B"	16	1	0	15	19	99	−80	3

Source: GLDF
(C) Champions

=== Russell Cup ===
Second round	Arsenal Thirds	15–0	Rangers

Third round	Arsenal Thirds	6–1	Chipstead

Quarter-finals	Arsenal Thirds	2–3	Queens Park Rangers

== See also ==
- List of Arsenal W.F.C. seasons
- 1996–97 in English football
