= 1995–96 Arsenal L.F.C. season =

English women's football club season

Arsenal Ladies
1995–96 season
- Chairman: Peter Hill-Wood
- Manager: Vic Akers
- Stadium: Hayes Lane
- Premier League: Third Place
- FA Cup: Semi Final
- Premier League Cup: Semi Final
- London County Cup: Winners
- Biggest win: 10–0 (vs Manchester United (H), FA Cup, 03 December 1995)
- Biggest defeat: 1–4 (vs Wembley (H), Premier League Cup, 04 February 1996)
Home colours	Away colours	Third colours

The 1995–96 season was Arsenal Ladies Football Club's 9th season since forming in 1987. The club participated in the National Division of the FA Women's Premier League, finishing in third place. They failed to progress in the Premier League Cup and the FA Cup as well, meaning they missed out on all three major trophies. However, they were able to retain the London County Cup for a second year in a row, by defeating Millwall Lionesses in the Final.

This season, Arsenal moved south from The Lantern Stadium at Potters Bar, to take up a new home at Hayes Lane in Bromley.

== Squad information & statistics ==
=== First team squad ===
Name	Date of Birth (Age)	Since	Signed From
Goalkeepers
(Spain) Roser Serra	30 August 1971 (aged 24)	1995	(Spain) Barcelona
(England) Kathy Simmons	7 January 1966 (aged 30)	1991	(England) Tottenham
(England) Nancy Jeffery	18 February 1978 (aged 18)	1989	(England) Limehouse
Defenders
(England) Kirsty Pealling	14 April 1975 (aged 21)	1987	(England) Arsenal Academy
(England) Michelle Curley	30 April 1972 (aged 24)	1988	(England) Arsenal Academy
(England) Jenny Canty	22 March 1976 (aged 20)	1991	(England) Limehouse
(England) Vicki Slee	9 March 1973 (aged 23)	1991	(England) Millwall Lionesses
(England) Kelley Few	17 October 1971 (aged 24)	1991	(England) Romford
(Northern Ireland) Gill Wylie	27 August 1965 (aged 30)	1991	(England) Tottenham
(England) Amy Lamont	5 May 1974 (aged 22)	1989	(England) Arsenal Academy
(England) Clare Wheatley	4 February 1971 (aged 25)	1995	(England) Chelsea
(England) Jo Moruzzi	16 May 1981 (aged 15)	1995	(England) Arsenal Academy
(England) Julia Brown	8 February 1974 (aged 22)	1995	(England) Portsmouth
(England) Lisa Spry	15 January 1968 (aged 28)	1989	(England) Islington
(England) Michelle Riley	1976 (aged 19)	1995	(England) Croydon
(England) Carly Cruickshank		1992	(England) Limehouse
Midfielders
(England) Sian Williams (c)	2 February 1968 (aged 28)	1990	(England) Millwall Lionesses
(England) Emma Hayes	18 October 1976 (aged 19)	1991	(England) Arsenal Academy
(England) Sammy Britton	8 December 1973 (aged 22)	1993	(England) Bronte
(England) Emma Coss	9 May 1979 (aged 17)	1992	(England) Arsenal Academy
(England) Sharon Barber	27 May 1969 (aged 27)	1988	(England) Tottenham
(England) Sarah Clark	1972 (aged 24)	1993	(England) Ipswich Town
(England) Joanne Broadhurst	27 November 1967 (aged 28)	1995	(England) Doncaster Belles
(England) Linda Watt	19 May 1973 (aged 23)	1995	(England) Watford
(England) Emma Hastings	24 November 1977 (aged 18)	1995	(England) Dunstable
(England) Beth Lovell	12 January 1980 (aged 16)	1995	(England) Arsenal Academy
Forwards
(England) Marieanne Spacey	13 February 1966 (aged 30)	1993	(England) Wimbledon
(England) Jo Churchman	8 October 1963 (aged 32)	1990	(England) Millwall Lionesses
(Scotland) Michelle Sneddon	18 January 1974 (aged 22)	1989	(Scotland) Coltness
(England) Becky Lonergan	18 January 1977 (aged 19)	1993	(England) Bronte
(Spain) Conchi Sánchez	28 September 1957 (aged 38)	1995	(Italy) Delfino
(England) Yvette Rean	11 April 1969 (aged 27)	1995	(England) Watford
(England) Julie Newell	6 December 1977 (aged 18)	1995	(England) Chelsea
(England) Kelly Townshend	12 May 1977 (aged 19)	1988	(England) Arsenal Academy
(England) Liz Benham	1975 (aged 20)	1996	(England) Croydon
(England) Pat Pile	1964 (aged 32)	1989	(England) Hackney
(England) Emma Burke	1975 (aged 21)	1995	(England) Oxford University
(England) Krista Yeomans		1991	(England) Arsenal Academy
(England) Naomi Poletyllo		1995	(England) Mill Hill United
Carla Rose		1996	(England) Bracknell

=== Goalscorers ===
Rank	Position	Name	PLND	FA Cup	PL Cup	LC Cup	Total
1	MF	(England) Joanne Broadhurst	13	1	2	3	19
2	FW	(England) Marieanne Spacey	14	0	0	0	14
3	MF	(England) Sammy Britton	6	3	1	2	12
4	DF	(England) Clare Wheatley	5	1	0	1	7
5	FW	(England) Yvette Rean	2	1	2	0	6
6	MF	(England) Sian Williams	2	2	1	0	5
7	MF	(England) Emma Hastings	1	0	0	2	3
7	FW	(England) Kelly Townshend	0	1	1	2	4
9	DF	(England) Kirsty Pealling	2	1	0	0	3
9	DF	(England) Kelley Few	1	2	0	0	3
9	FW	(Spain) Conchi Sánchez	2	1	0	0	3
12	FW	Emma Burke	3	0	0	0	3
12	FW	(England) Liz Benham	0	0	0	3	4
14	FW	(Scotland) Michelle Sneddon	1	0	0	0	1
14	DF	(England) Michelle Curley	1	0	0	0	1
14	FW	(England) Pat Pile	1	0	0	0	1
14	MF	(England) Linda Watt	0	0	0	1	1
14	DF	(England) Vicki Slee	0	0	0	1	1
Own goal			0	0	1	0	1
Total			54	14	9	13	90

=== Clean sheets ===
Rank	Name	PLND	FA Cup	PL Cup	LC Cup	Total
1	(Spain) Roser Serra	10	1	1	0	12
2	(England) Kathy Simmons	0	1	0	1	2
3	(England) Nancy Jeffery	0	0	0	0	0
Unknown goalkeeper		1	0	0	1	2
Total		11	2	1	2	16

== Transfers, loans and other signings ==
=== Transfers in ===
Announcement date	Position	Player	From club
1995	GK	(Spain) Roser Serra	(Spain) Barcelona
1995	DF	(England) Clare Wheatley	(England) Chelsea
1995	DF	(England) Julia Brown	(England) Portsmouth
1995	MF	(England) Linda Watt	(England) Watford
1995	MF	(England) Joanne Broadhurst	(England) Doncaster Belles
1995	FW	(England) Emma Hastings	(England) Dunstable
1995	FW	(Spain) Conchi Sánchez	(Italy) Delfino
1995	FW	(England) Yvette Rean	(England) Watford
December 1995	FW	(England) Julie Newell	(England) Chelsea
December 1995	FW	(England) Naomi Poletyllo	(England) Mill Hill United
1996	FW	(England) Liz Benham	(England) Croydon
1995	DF	(England) Michelle Riley	(England) Croydon
1995	FW	Emma Burke	(England) Oxford University
January 1996	FW	Carla Rose	(England) Bracknell

=== Transfers out ===
Announcement date	Position	Player	To club
1995	GK	(England) Pauline Cope	(England) Millwall Lionesses
1995	DF	(England) Kellie Battams	Retired
1995	MF	(England) Michelle Lee	(England) Wembley
1995	FW	(Wales) Naz Ball	(England) Wembley
1995	FW	(England) Becky Lonergan	(England) Millwall Lionesses
1995	FW	(England) Liz Benham	(England) Croydon
1995	FW	(England) Christine Couling	Retirement
1995	FW	(England) Andrea Wright	(England) Wembley
1995	MF	Adele Hinder	(England) Wimbledon
December 1995	DF	(England) Michelle Riley	(England) Croydon
December 1995	FW	(England) Jo Churchman	Retired
1995	FW	(United States) Tiffany Schreiner	(United States) Littleton United
1995		Joanne Cook	

== Club ==
=== Kit ===
Supplier: Nike / Sponsor: JVC

Home	Away	Third

== Non-competitive ==
=== Undercard match ===
24 April 1996	Wembley	1–0	Arsenal	Wembley
	Ball			Stadium: Wembley Stadium

== Competitions ==
=== Overall record ===
Competition	First match	Last match	Starting round	Final position	Record							
Competition	First match	Last match	Starting round	Final position	Pld	W	D	L	GF	GA	GD	Win %
FA Women's Premier League National Division	3 September 1995	14 May 1996	Matchday 1	3rd	18	11	4	3	54	12	+42	61.11
FA Women's Cup	3 December 1995	24 March 1996	Fourth round	Semi-finals	4	3	1	0	14	2	+12	75.00
FA Women's Premier League Cup	17 December 1995	4 February 1996	Third round	Semi-finals	3	2	0	1	9	5	+4	66.67
London County Cup	26 November 1995	7 May 1996	Quarter-finals	Winners	3	3	0	0	15	1	+14	100.00
Total					28	19	5	4	92	20	+72	67.86

Last updated: 22 May 2026
Source: FA WPL

=== FA Women's Premier League National Division ===
==== Partial league table ====
Pos	Team	Pld	W	D	L	GF	GA	GD	Pts
1	Croydon (C)	18	13	5	0	58	17	+41	44
2	Doncaster Belles	18	14	2	2	57	19	+38	44
3	Arsenal	18	11	4	3	54	12	+42	37
4	Everton	18	10	1	7	44	40	+4	31
5	Liverpool	18	9	2	7	36	27	+9	29

Source: FA WPL
(C) Champions

==== Results summary ====
Overall								Home						Away					
Pld	W	D	L	GF	GA	GD	Pts	W	D	L	GF	GA	GD	W	D	L	GF	GA	GD
18	11	4	3	54	12	+42	37	6	2	1	33	4	+29	5	2	2	21	8	+13

==== Results by matchday ====
Matchday	1	2	3	4	5	6	7	8	9	10	11	12	13	14	15	16	17	18
Ground	A	H	H	A	A	H	H	H	A	H	A	A	H	A	H	H	A	A
Result	W	L	W	L	W	W	D	W	W	W	W	D	D	D	W	W	W	L
Position	1	3	3	4	3	3	3	3	3	2	2	2	2	2	2	2	2	3

Source: FA WPL
W = Win; D = Draw; L = Loss

==== Matches ====
3 September 1995 1	Liverpool	0–6	Arsenal	Anfield
		Report	Spacey; Broadhurst; Britton; Pealling	Stadium: Anfield; Attendance: 500

10 September 1995 2	Arsenal	1–2	Doncaster Belles	Bromley
14:00 BST	Spacey 11'	Report	Skillcorn 67'; Walker 77'	Stadium: Hayes Lane; Referee: R Greenwod

17 September 1995 3	Arsenal	7–0	Ilkeston Town	Bromley
14:00 BST	Spacey 15'; Wheatley; Broadhurst; Britton; Sneddon	Report		Stadium: Hayes Lane; Referee: S. Lomas

1 October 1995 4	Villa Aztecs	3–1	Arsenal	Knowle
14:00 BST	Robinson 10'; Hurley 15'; Masters	Report	Britton; Curley (red card) 65'	Stadium: Robins' Nest; Referee: Miss M. Isles (Birmingham)

8 October 1995 5	Wolverhampton Wanderers	0–5	Arsenal	Willenhall
		Report	Britton; Spacey; Curley; Hastings	Stadium: Noose Lane

15 October 1995 6	Arsenal	6–0	Everton	Bromley
14:00 BST	Few 6'; Britton; Spacey 38' (pen.) 42'	Report		Stadium: Hayes Lane; Referee: N. Copperwheat

22 October 1995 7	Arsenal	1–1	Croydon	Bromley
14:00 BST	Spacey 20'	Report	Powell 70'	Stadium: Hayes Lane

5 November 1995 8	Arsenal	2–0	Millwall Lionesses	Bromley
	Spacey (pen.); Broadhurst	Report		Stadium: Hayes Lane

12 November 1995 9	Wembley	0–1	Arsenal	Wembley
14:00 BST		Report	Broadhurst 75'	Stadium: Vale Farm; Referee: C. Stupack

9 December 1995 10	Arsenal	3–0	Liverpool	Highbury
16:00 GMT	Sánchez 15'; Pealling 35'; Broadhurst 80'	Report		Stadium: Highbury; Referee: R. Daisley

7 January 1996 11	Ilkeston Town	0–3	Arsenal	Ilkeston
15:00 GMT		Report	Sánchez 28'; Broadhurst 60', 80' (pen.)	Stadium: New Manor Ground; Referee: Mr Anderson

3 March 1996 12	Millwall Lionesses	0–0	Arsenal	Bermondsey
14:00 GMT		Report		Stadium: Surrey Docks Stadium; Referee: D. Thomas

10 April 1996 13	Arsenal	0–0	Wembley	Bromley
19:45 BST		Report		Stadium: Hayes Lane; Referee: N. Copperwheat

14 April 1996 14	Doncaster Belles	2–2	Arsenal	Armthorpe
14:00 BST	Coulthard 34', 81'	Report	Broadhurst (pen.); Wheatley 52'	Stadium: Welfare Ground; Referee: D E Davies

20 April 1996 15	Arsenal	9–0	Wolverhampton Wanderers	Highbury
17:30 GMT	Burke 30', 33'; Williams 35'; Pile 55'; Rean 81', 83'; Wheatley 85'; Broadhurst 87', 89'	Report		Stadium: Highbury

21 April 1996 16	Arsenal	4–1	Villa Aztecs	Forest Gate
13:00 BST	Broadhurst; Wheatley; Williams	Report	Goal	Stadium: The Old Spotted Dog Ground; Referee: N. Copperwheat

27 April 1996 17	Everton	1–2	Arsenal	Crosby
14:15 BST	Goal	Report	Broadhurst (pen.); Wheatley	Stadium: Rossett Park

14 May 1996 18	Croydon	2–1	Arsenal	Thamesmead
20:00 BST	Davis 51'; Sempare 85'	Report	Burke 45+2'	Stadium: Bayliss Avenue; Attendance: 151; Referee: W. Stoneham

=== FA Women's Cup ===
3 December 1995 Fourth round	Arsenal	10–0	Manchester United	Bromley
14:00 GMT	Sánchez 18'; Townshend; Britton 48'; Broadhurst; Pealling 62'; Rean; Few 75'; Wheatley; Williams	Report		Stadium: Hayes Lane; Attendance: 100; Referee: N. Copperwheat

21 January 1996 Fifth round	Arsenal	2–1	Wembley	Bromley
13:30 GMT	Williams 29'; Few	Report	Ball 40'	Stadium: Hayes Lane; Attendance: 101; Referee: R. Chilvers

25 February 1996 Quarter-finals	Ilkeston Town	1–2	Arsenal	Ilkeston
15:00 GMT	Saggers 60'	Report	Britton 22'; Slee (yellow card) 41'; Hastings 88'	Stadium: New Manor Ground; Attendance: 411; Referee: Mr W Evans

24 March 1996 Semi-finals	Liverpool	0–0 (a.e.t.) (5–4 p)	Arsenal	Runcorn
14:00 GMT		Report		Stadium: Canal Street; Attendance: 351; Referee: T. Massey
	Penalties
	Easton (penalty scored); Formston (penalty scored)		(penalty missed) Few; (penalty scored) Slee; (penalty scored) Broadhurst; (penalty scored) Williams; (penalty scored) Pealling

=== FA Women's Premier League Cup ===
17 December 1995 Third round	Arsenal	5–0	Garswoods St Helens	Bromley
13:30 GMT	Williams; Broadhurst; Rean; Townshend; (o.g.)	Report		Stadium: Hayes Lane; Referee: H. Thomas

14 January 1996 Quarter-finals	Three Bridges	1–3	Arsenal	Three Bridges
14:00 GMT	Hutson (pen.); Driscoll (red card) 80'	Report	Rean; Britton; Broadhurst 21'; Coss (red card) 80'	Stadium: Jubilee Field; Referee: Dr Paul Gale

4 February 1996 Semi-finals	Arsenal	1–4	Wembley	Bromley
13:30 GMT	Rean 45'	Report	Jerray-Silver 5'; Jones 43'; Ball 45+2', 55'	Stadium: Hayes Lane; Referee: A. G. Morton

=== London County Cup ===
26 November 1995 Quarter-finals	London Girls	0–7	Arsenal
			Wheatley; Britton; Townsend; Hastings; Watt

17 March 1996 Semi-finals	Leyton Orient	0–6	Arsenal	Walthamstow
14:00 GMT		Report	Broadhurst; Benham; Britton; Slee	Stadium: Wadham Lodge; Referee: D.I. Thomas

7 May 1996 Final	Millwall Lionesses	1–2	Arsenal	Bermondsey
19:30 BST	Murphy 56'	Report	Broadhurst 58'; Benham 81'	Stadium: Surrey Docks Stadium; Attendance: 119; Referee: David Thomas

== Arsenal reserves ==
=== Greater London Regional Women’s League Premier Division ===
==== League table ====
Pos	Team	Pld	W	D	L	GF	GA	GD	Pts
1	Arsenal Reserves (C)	18	15	2	1	82	22	+60	47
2	Tottenham Hotspur	17	12	2	3	53	20	+33	38
3	Wembley Reserves	18	8	7	3	56	32	+24	31
4	Mill Hill United	18	7	6	5	29	31	−2	27
5	Chelsea	17	6	3	8	36	32	+4	21
6	Dulwich Hamlet	18	7	3	8	32	33	−1	24
7	Newham	17	6	5	6	34	37	−3	23
8	Wimbledon Reserves	18	3	3	12	27	54	−27	12
9	Hackney	16	3	3	10	16	57	−41	12
10	Watford	17	1	4	12	18	65	−47	7

Source: GLPD
(C) Champions

==== Matches ====
17 September 1995	Wimbledon Reserves	1–9	Arsenal Reserves
	Goal		Hasting; Rean; Townshend; Riley; Churchman; Spry

24 September 1995	Chelsea	1–4	Arsenal Reserves	New Malden
	Impett	Report	Rean; Sánchez; Watt	Stadium: Motspur Park

1 October 1995	Arsenal Reserves	3–0	Tottenham Hotspur	Beckenham
	Hastings; Sánchez			Stadium: Commercial Union Sports Ground

8 October 1995	Arsenal Reserves	2–1	Wimbledon Reserves	Beckenham
	Canty 40'; Watt 81'		Stanbury 20'; (penalty missed) 88'	Stadium: Commercial Union Sports Ground

15 October 1995	Arsenal Reserves	6–0	Watford	Beckenham
	Townshend; Rean; Clark			Stadium: Commercial Union Sports Ground

22 October 1995	Wembley Reserves	4–4	Arsenal Reserves
	Goal		Townshend; Rean; Watt

29 October 1995	Arsenal Reserves	10–0	Hackney	Beckenham
	Townshend; Hastings; Rean; Pile; Canty; (o.g.)			Stadium: Commercial Union Sports Ground

5 November 1995	Dulwich	2–3	Arsenal Reserves
	Goal		Rean; Sánchez

19 November 1995	Arsenal Reserves	3–0	Wembley Reserves	Beckenham
	Watt; Newell; Rean			Stadium: Commercial Union Sports Ground

26 November 1995	Arsenal Reserves	4–1	Dulwich	Beckenham
	Sánchez; Rean		Goal	Stadium: Commercial Union Sports Ground

17 December 1995	Watford	2–4	Arsenal Reserves

14 January 1996	Tottenham Hotspur	5–1	Arsenal Reserves
	Goal		Townshend

11 February 1996	Arsenal Reserves	6–1	Mill Hill United	Beckenham
				Stadium: Commercial Union Sports Ground

10 March 1996	Arsenal Reserves	5–1	Newham	Beckenham
				Stadium: Commercial Union Sports Ground

31 March 1996	Arsenal Reserves	6–1	Chelsea	Beckenham
		Report		Stadium: Commercial Union Sports Ground

21 April 1995	Hackney	1–5	Arsenal Reserves

28 April 1996	Newham	1–4	Arsenal Reserves

30 April 1996	Mill Hill United	2–2	Arsenal Reserves

=== Greater London Regional Women’s League Cup ===
3 March 1996 Quarter-finals	Mill Hill United	3–3 (a.e.t.) (3–4 p)	Arsenal Reserves
	Goal		Goal
	Penalties
	Penalty scored Penalty missed		Penalty scored

10 March 1996 Semi-finals	Tottenham Hotspur	4–4 (a.e.t.) (3–2 p)	Arsenal Reserves
	Blackmore 23'; Hoy 46', 80'; Wedderburn	Report	Goal
	Penalties
	Penalty scored Penalty missed		Penalty scored Penalty missed

== Arsenal thirds ==
=== Greater London Regional Women’s League Division Six ===
==== League table ====
Pos	Team	Pld	W	D	L	GF	GA	GD	Pts	Qualification or relegation
1	Arsenal Thirds (C)	14	13	1	0	120	9	+111	40	
2	Brentford Beecham	14	12	0	2	88	29	+59	36	
3	Enfield Reserves	14	8	0	6	53	34	+19	24	
4	Charlton Thirds	14	5	1	8	39	85	−46	16	
5	Southend Manor Reserves	14	4	3	7	35	50	−15	15	
6	London Fourth	14	4	0	10	24	84	−60	12	
7	Newham Reserves	14	3	1	10	31	67	−36	10	
8	Queens Park Rangers Reserves	14	2	4	8	18	50	−32	10	
9	Crystal Palace Reserves	0	0	0	0	0	0	0	0	All results expunged for this season.
10	Millwall Lionesses Thirds	0	0	0	0	0	0	0	0	All results expunged for this season.

Source: GLDS
(C) Champions

=== Russell Cup ===
Arsenal Thirds	4–5	Drayton Wanderers
Mutt; Lovell; Harmycz		Goal

=== Sue Sharples Memorial Cup ===
14 April 1996 Final	Arsenal Thirds	3–2	Tottenham Hotspur Reserves	Hampton
13:30 BST	Poletyllo 45', 51'; Rose 65'		Ryan 73' (pen.); Pinnock 84'	Stadium: Beveree Stadium

== See also ==
- List of Arsenal W.F.C. seasons
- 1995–96 in English football
