= 1997–98 FA Women's Premier League Cup =

Tournament details
- Country: England

Final positions
- Champions: Arsenal
- Runners-up: Croydon

The 1997–98 FA Women's Premier League Cup was the 8th staging of the FA Women's Premier League Cup, a knockout competition for England's top 36 women's football clubs.

The tournament was won by Arsenal, who beat Croydon 4–3 on penalties after a 0–0 draw in the final.

== Results ==
=== First round ===
Matches were played on 19 and 26 October 1997. Millwall Lionesses and Everton were given byes into the next round.

19 October 1997	Arsenal (NA)	6–2	Huddersfield Town (NO)
	Mapes 13'; Spacey 37', 63', 69', 80'; Pealling 68'	Report	Mitchell 22'; Knight 24'

19 October 1997	Barry Town (S)	3–6 (a.e.t.)	Wolverhampton Wanderers (NO)
	Goal	Report	Goal

19 October 1997	Blyth Spartans Kestrels (NO)	5–3	Ipswich Town (S)
	Goal	Report	Goal

19 October 1997	Bradford City (NA)	6–0	Arnold Town (S)
	Garside; Teale; Teale; Hagerty-Crosse	Report

19 October 1997	Doncaster Belles (NA)	1–1 (4–5 p)	Liverpool (NA)
	Jackon 42' (pen.)	Report	Hewitt 41'
	Penalties
	Penalty missed Penalty scored		Penalty missed Penalty scored

19 October 1997	Leyton Orient (S)	1–4	Southampton Saints (S)
	Goal	Report	Goal

19 October 1997	Sheffield Wednesday (N)	6–0	Coventry City (N)
	Goal	Report

19 October 1997	Three Bridges (S)	2–3	Croydon (NA)
	Tagg; Naish	Report	(o.g.); Broadhurst 30'; Britton 90'

19 October 1997	Tranmere Rovers (NA)	3–1	Brighton & Hove Albion (S)
	Goal	Report	Goal

19 October 1997	Wembley (NA)	3–1	Bloxwich Town (NO)
	Goal	Report	Goal

26 October 1997	Garswood Saints (NO)	1–4	lkeston Town (NO)
	Plinston (o.g.)	Report	Higham; Wale; Plinston; White

26 October 1997	Langford (S)	0–9	Wimbledon (S)
		Report	Goal

26 October 1997	Whitehawk (S)	2–1	Aston Villa (NO)
	Murray; Birch	Report	Goal

26 October 1997	Berkhamsted Town (NA)	11–1	Rushden & Diamonds (S)
	Hall; Lawrence; Payne; Overbye; Creary; Bevill	Report	Goal

=== Second round ===
Matches were played on 23 November and 14 December 1997

23 November 1997	Arsenal (NA)	2–1	Millwall Lionesses (NA)
	Spacey 55'; Daly 85'	Report	Chapman 17'

23 November 1997	Ilkeston Town (NO)	2–3	Croydon (NA)
	(pen.)	Report	Powell; Davis; Bampton

23 November 1997	Liverpool	8–0	Whitehawk (S)
	Hewitt 15'; Lowe 17'	Report

23 November 1997	Tranmere Rovers (NA)	1–1 (a.e.t.) (5–4 p)	Blyth Spartans Kestrals (NO)
	Smith	Report	Goal
	Penalties
	Penalty scored		Penalty scored Penalty missed

23 November 1997	Wembley (NA)	0–5	Bradford City (NA)
		Report	Goal

23 November 1997	Wimbledon (S)	2–3	Southampton Saints (S)
	Goal	Report	Goal

23 November 1997	Wolverhampton Wanderers (NO)	0–8	Everton (NA)
		Report	Thomas 2'; Burke; Easton; Ryde; McGrady; Burton

14 December 1997	Sheffield Wednesday (NO)	0–2	Berkhamsted Town (NA)
		Report	Payne 55'

=== Quarter-finals ===
Matches were played on the 14 and 21 December 1997.

14 December 1997	Bradford City (NA)	4–2	Southampton Saints (S)
	Goal	Report	Goal

14 December 1997	Croydon (NA)	2–1 (a.e.t.)	Liverpool (NA)
	Bampton 61'	Report	Davies

14 December 1997	Everton (NA)	2–1	Tranmere Rovers (NA)
	Marley; Halfpenny	Report	Goal

21 December 1997	Arsenal (NA)	4–0	Berkhamsted Town (NA)
	Daly; White; Jerray-Silver	Report

=== Semi-finals ===
Matches were played on 25 January 1998.

25 January 1998	Bradford City (NA)	2–2 (a.e.t.) (2–4 p)	Arsenal (NA)
	Garside 20' (pen.), 40'	Report	Yankey 8'; Few 70'
	Penalties
	Penalty missed Penalty scored		(penalty scored) Yankey; (penalty scored) Pealling; (penalty scored) Williams; (penalty scored) Spacey

25 January 1998	Croydon (NA)	2–0	Everton (NA)
	Davis 47'	Report

=== Final ===
2 March 1998

Arsenal	0–0 (a.e.t.)	Croydon
	Report
Penalties
Slee (penalty missed); Williams (penalty scored); White (penalty scored); Yankey (penalty scored); Spacey (penalty scored)	4–3	(penalty scored) Broadhurst; (penalty scored) Powell; (penalty scored) Bampton; (penalty missed) Wylie; (penalty missed) Davis

Underhill Stadium, Barnet
