= 1995–96 FA Women's Premier League Cup =

Tournament details
- Country: England

Final positions
- Champions: Wembley
- Runners-up: Doncaster Rovers Belles

The 1995–96 FA Women's Premier League Cup was the 5th staging of the FA Women's Premier League Cup, a knockout competition for England's top 36 women's football clubs.

The tournament was won by Wembley, who beat Doncaster Rovers Belles 5–3 via a penalty shootout after a 2–2 draw in the final.

== Results ==
=== First round ===
Matches were played on 22 October 1995. Bronte were given a bye into the Second round.

22 October 1995	Brentford (S)	1–7	Tranmere Rovers (NO)
	Goal	Report	Goal

22 October 1995	Ipswich Town (S)	2–3	Berkhamsted Town (S)
	Goal	Report	Goal

22 October 1995	Kidderminster Harriers (NO)	0–5	Garswood St Helens (NO)
		Report	Goal

22 October 1995	Leyton Orient (S)	4–2 (a.e.t.)	Notts County (NO)
	Goal	Report	Goal

22 October 1995	Southampton Saints (S)	3–1	Sheffield Wednesday (NO)
	Goal	Report	Goal

22 October 1995	Three Bridges (S)	3–0	Oxford United (S)
	Goal	Report

22 October 1995	Town & County (S)	1–0	Brighton & Hove Albion (S)
	Goal	Report

22 October 1995	Wimbledon (S)	3–2	Huddersfield Town (N)
	Goal	Report	Goal

22 October 1995	RTM Newcastle Kestrels (NO)	1–2	Langford (NO)
	Goal	Report	Goal

=== Second round ===
Matches were played on 26 November and 17 December 1995.

26 November 1995	Bronte (NO)	0–13	Liverpool (NA)
		Report	Goal

26 November 1995	Garswood St Helens (NO)	4–1	Southampton Saints (S)
	Goal	Report	Goal

17 December 1995	Ilkeston Town (NA)	1–2	Croydon (NA)
	Wren 47'	Report	Dines 32'; Proctor 37'

17 December 1995	Millwall Lionesses (NA)	2–1	Berkhamsted Town (S)
	Goal	Report	Goal

=== Third round ===
Matches were played on 17 December 1995 and 7 January 1996.

17 December 1995	Arsenal (NA)	5–0	Garswoods St Helens (NO)
	Williams; Broadhurst; Rean; Townshend; (o.g.)	Report

17 December 1995	Doncaster Belles (NA)	7–0	Langford (NO)
	Jackson 7'; Exley 46', 65', 75'; Walker 57', 60', 80'	Report

17 December 1995	Leyton Orient (S)	5–2	Town & County (S)
	Goal	Report	Goal

17 December 1995	Three Bridges (S)	3–3 (a.e.t.) (5–3 p)	Wimbledon (S)
	Condon 43', 75'; Newton	Report	Stanbury 42'
	Penalties
	Penalty scored		Penalty scored Penalty missed

17 December 1995	Tranmere Rovers (NO)	5–1	Wolverhampton Wanderers (NA)
	Goal	Report	Goal

17 December 1995	Wembley (NA)	4–0	Villa Aztecs (NA)
	Ball 21'; Jerray-Silver 61'; Lorton	Report

7 January 1996	Millwall Lionesses (NA)	0–4	Liverpool (NA)
		Report	Goal

7 January 1996	Everton (NA)	4–4 (a.e.t.) (4–5 p)	Croydon (NA)
	Marley; Thomas 120'	Report	Cottier; Mapes; Mulligan 90'; Powell
	Penalties
	Ashworth (penalty missed); Bell (penalty missed)		(penalty scored) McGloin

=== Quarter-finals ===
Matches were played on 14 January and 4 February 1996.

14 January 1996	Leyton Orient (S)	0–10	Doncaster Belles (NA)
		Report	Walker; Coultard; Borman; Sherrard

14 January 1996	Three Bridges (S)	1–3	Arsenal (NA)
	Hutson (pen.)	Report	Rean; Britton; Broadhurst 21'

14 January 1996	Liverpool (NA)	1–3	Wembley (NA)
	McGuiggan 80'	Report	Ball 70'

4 February 1996	Tranmere Rovers (NO)	0–1	Croydon (NA)
		Report	Dines

=== Semi-finals ===
Matches were played on 4 and 18 February 1996.

4 February 1996	Arsenal (NA)	1–4	Wembley (NA)
	Rean 45'	Report	Jerray-Silver 5'; Jones 43'; Ball 45+2', 55'

18 February 1996	Croydon (NA)	1–3	Doncaster Belles (NA)
	Mapes 77'	Report	Walker 15', 53', 86'

=== Final ===
10 March 1996
14:30 GMT

Wembley	2–2 (a.e.t.)	Doncaster Belles
Ball 6'; Liran 90+5' (pen.)	Report	Walker 40'; Lonergan 44'
Penalties
Jerray-Silver (penalty scored); Smith (penalty scored); Liran (penalty scored); Lorton (penalty scored); Ball (penalty scored)	5–3	(penalty missed) Begg

Underhill Stadium, Barnet
Attendance: 487
Referee: S Lomas (Chiswick)

Wembley	Doncaster Belles

GK
DF
DF
DF
MF
MF
MF
MF
FW
FW
FW
Substitutes:
FW
DF
DF
GK
Manager:
(England) John Jones

(England) Lesley Higgs
(England) Carol Harwood (c)
(England) Julie Darby
(Israel) Ayala Liran
(England) Tracy Koch
(England) Kelly Smith
(England) Justine Lorton
(England) Sue Jones	(substituted off) 76'
(England) Michelle Lee	(substituted off) 50'
(Wales) Naz Ball
(England) Wendy Grant
(England) Kim Jerray-Silver	(substituted on) 50'
(England) Lynn Frampton	(substituted on) 76'
(England) Debbie Wood
(England) Sarah Reed

GK	(England) Debbie Biggins
DF	(England) Issy Pollard
DF	(England) Chantel Woodhead
DF	(England) Michelle Jackson
DF	(England) Claire Utley
MF	(England) Gillian Coultard (c)
MF	(England) Vicky Exley
MF	(England) Jackie Sherrard
MF	(England) Gail Borman
FW	(England) Karen Walker
FW	(England) Becky Lonergan	(substituted off) 76'
Substitutes:
MF	(England) Sarah Begg	(substituted on) 76'
DF	(England) Yvonne Bagley
DF	(England) Katrina Clarke
GK	(England) Clare Davis
Manager:
(England) Mel Woodhall
