= 1998 FA Women's Cup final =

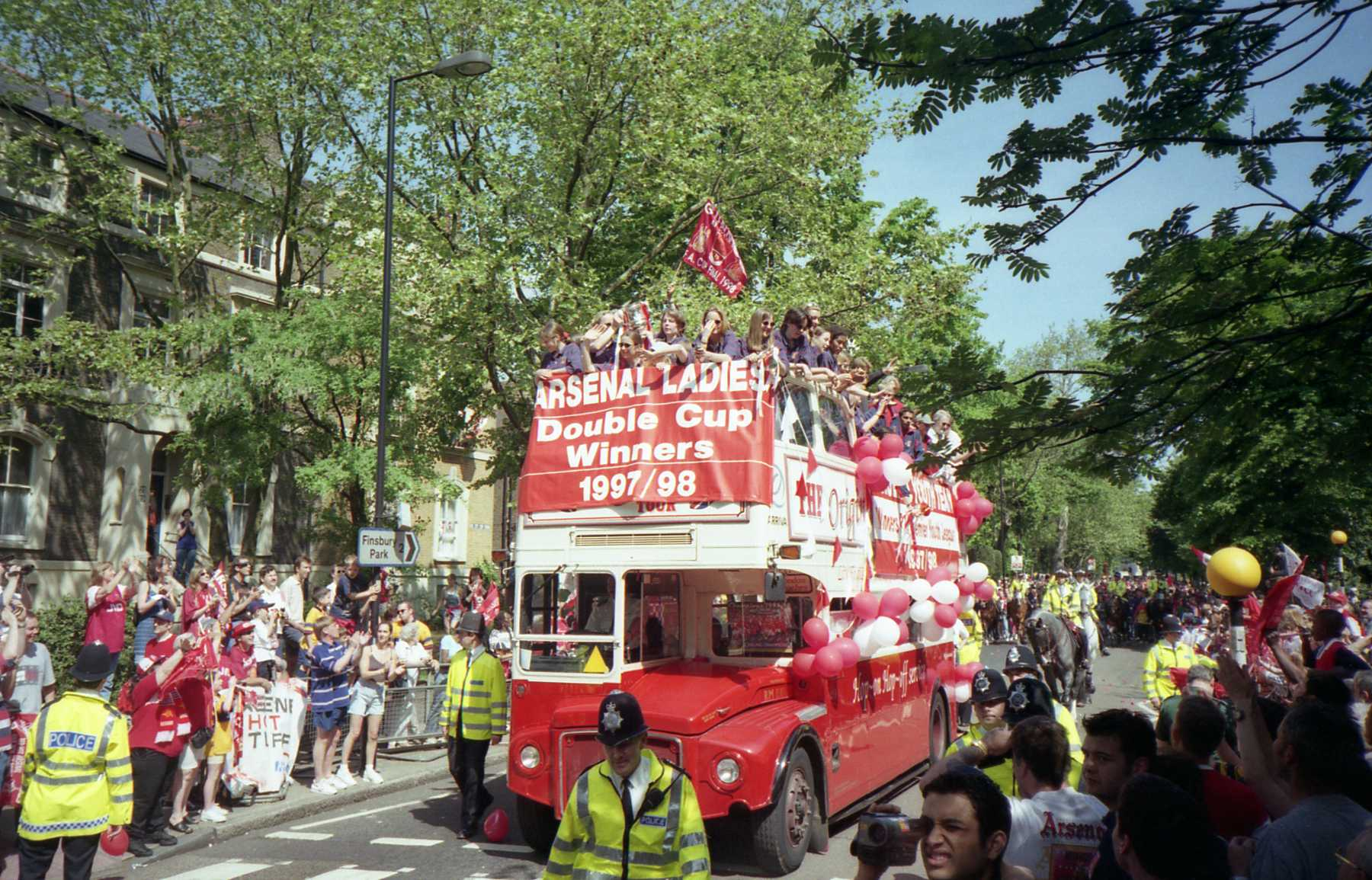
- Arsenal celebrate a Cup double in 1998
- Event: 1997–98 FA Women's Cup
Arsenal	Croydon
3	2
- Date: 4 May 1998
- Venue: The New Den, London
- Referee: Alan Wiley (Staffordshire)
- Attendance: 2,205

The 1998 FA Women's Cup final was the 27th final of the FA Women's Cup, England's primary cup competition for women's football teams. It was the fifth final to be held under the direct control of the Football Association (FA). It was contested between Arsenal and Croydon Women at The New Den, home of Millwall. The final ended 3–2 in favour of Arsenal. The final was broadcast on BSkyB. As their men's counterpart won the 1997–98 FA Cup, Arsenal became the first club to win both the men's and women's FA Cup in the same season after the FA's take over of the women's tournament in 1993.

== Match details ==
4 May 1998
14:00 BST

Arsenal	3–2	Croydon
Spacey 17'; Yankey 52'; Few 90+3'	Report	Broadhurst 10' (pen.); Powell 55'

The New Den, London
Attendance: 2,205
Referee: Alan Wiley (Staffordshire)

Arsenal	Croydon

GK	1	(England) Sarah Reed
LWB	3	(England) Kim Jerray-Silver
LCB	8	(England) Kelley Few
CB	5	(England) Carol Harwood	(yellow card) 85'
RCB	6	(England) Faye White (c)
RWB	2	(England) Kirsty Pealling	(yellow card) 82'
LCM	4	(England) Vicki Slee
CM	9	(England) Marieanne Spacey
RCM	7	(England) Sian Williams
FW	11	(England) Rachel Yankey
FW	10	(England) Tina Mapes		(substituted off) 65'
Substitutes:
DF	17	(Republic of Ireland) Tammy Scrivens
MF	16	(England) Linda Watt
FW	12	(England) Natasha Daly		(substituted on) 65'
FW	14	(England) Emma Hastings
FW	15	(England) Nina Downham
Manager:
(England) Terry Howard

GK	1	(England) Louise Cooper
LWB	2	(England) Julie Fletcher
LCB	3	(England) Alex Cottier
CB	5	(Northern Ireland) Gill Wylie	(yellow card) 49'
RCB	6	(England) Julie Darby
RWB	10	(England) Kerry Davis
LCM	4	(England) Hope Powell (c)
CM	8	(England) Debbie Bampton
RCM	11	(England) Tara Proctor
FW	7	(England) Sammy Britton	(yellow card) 73'
FW	9	(England) Joanne Broadhurst
Substitutes:
GK		(England) Debbie Biggins
DF	14	(England) Anita Dines
DF	15	(England) Carole Osborne
MF	12	(England) Sharon Barber
FW	16	(England) Sue Jones
Manager:
(England) Debbie Bampton

Player of the match

Assistant referees:
D. R. Spicer
Wendy Toms
Fourth official:
R. G. Smith

Match rules

- 90 minutes.
- 30 minutes of extra-time if necessary.
- Penalty shoot-out if scores still level.
- Five named substitutes.
- Maximum of three substitutions.

== Reception ==
Andy Gray and Richard Keys of Sky Sports are noted for laughing at the skill of women's footballers in the final of the competition.
