= 1999 FA Women's Cup final =

1999 FA Women's Cup Final
- The match programme cover
- Event: 1998–99 FA Women's Cup
| Arsenal | Southampton Saints |
| 2 | 0 |
- Date: 3 May 1999
- Venue: The Valley, London
- Player of the Match: Debbie Beer (Southampton Saints)
- Referee: Wendy Toms (Dorset)
- Attendance: 6,450

The 1999 FA Women's Cup Final was the 28th final of the FA Women's Cup, England's primary cup competition for women's football teams. It was the sixth final to be held under the direct control of the Football Association (FA). It was contested between Arsenal and Southampton Saints. The match was played at the Valley, the home stadium of Charlton Athletic. The final ended 2–0 in favour of Arsenal.

== Match details ==
3 May 1999
14:30 BST

| Arsenal | 2–0 | Southampton Saints |
|---|---|---|
| Hayes 14' (o.g.); Wheatley 41' | Report |

The Valley, London
Attendance: 6,450
Referee: Wendy Toms (Dorset)

| Arsenal | Southampton Saints |

| GK | 1 | (England) Sarah Reed |
| RWB | 2 | (England) Kirsty Pealling |
| RCB | 5 | (England) Carol Harwood | (substituted off) 84' |
| CB | 4 | (England) Vicki Slee |
| LCB | 6 | (England) Faye White |
| LWB | 3 | (England) Clare Wheatley |
| RCM | 8 | (Republic of Ireland) Ciara Grant |
| CM | 7 | (England) Sian Williams (c) |
| LCM | 10 | (England) Justine Lorton | (substituted off) 84' |
| FW | 9 | (England) Marieanne Spacey |
| FW | 11 | (England) Rachel Yankey | (substituted off) 78' |
Substitutes:
| DF | 15 | (Republic of Ireland) Carol Conlon |
| FW | 12 | (England) Kelley Few |
| FW | 16 | (England) Nina Downham | (substituted on) 78' |
| MF | 17 | (Australia) Taryn Rockall | (substituted on) 84' |
| MF | 14 | (England) Tina Mapes | (substituted on) 84' |
Manager:
(England) Vic Akers

| GK | 1 | (England) Debbie Beer |
| RWB | 7 | (England) Gemma Ritchie |
| RCB | 2 | (England) Alli Short |
| CB | 4 | (England) Sharon Hayes (c) |
| LCB | 5 | (England) Lynn Armstrong |
| LWB | 11 | (England) Cher Beesley | (substituted off) 60' |
| RCM | 8 | (England) Angela Fisher |
| LCM | 6 | (England) Rachel McArthur |
| CAM | 3 | (England) Abbie Gould | (substituted off) 74' |
| FW | 9 | (England) Anna Dimsdale |
| FW | 10 | (England) Sarah Stainer | (substituted off) 74' |
Substitutes:
| DF | 15 | (England) Marie O'Brien | (substituted on) 60' |
| MF | 14 | (England) Katie Poore | (substituted on) 74' |
| MF | 12 | (England) Lisa Langrish | (substituted on) 74' |
| GK | | (England) Sue Buckett |
| FW | 16 | (England) Emma Parrent |
Manager:
(England) Vanessa Raynbird

Player of the match
Debbie Beer (Southampton Saints)

Assistant referees:
Martin Yerby (Kent)
Amy Rayner (Staffordshire)
Fourth official:
Mike Cairns (Hants)

Match rules

- 90 minutes.
- 30 minutes of extra-time if necessary.
- Penalty shoot-out if scores still level.
- Five named substitutes.
- Maximum of three substitutions.
