= 2004 FA Women's Cup final =

2004 FA Women's Cup Final
- The match programme cover
- Event: 2003–04 FA Women's Cup
Arsenal	Charlton Athletic
3	0
- Date: 3 May 2004
- Venue: Loftus Road, London
- Player of the Match: Julie Fleeting (Arsenal)
- Referee: Amy Rayner ( Leicestershire)
- Attendance: 12,244

The 2004 FA Women's Cup Final was the 34th final of the FA Women's Cup, England's primary cup competition for women's football teams. It was the 11th final to be held under the direct control of the Football Association (FA) and was known as the FA Women's Cup Final in partnership with Nationwide for sponsorship reasons. The final was contested between Arsenal and Charlton Athletic on 3 May 2004.

== Match details ==
3 May 2004
13:00 BST

Arsenal	3–0	Charlton Athletic
Fleeting 23', 25', 83'	Report

Loftus Road, London
Attendance: 12,244
Referee: Amy Rayner ( Leicestershire)

Arsenal	Charlton Athletic

GK	1	(Republic of Ireland) Emma Byrne
RWB	2	(England) Kirsty Pealling	(yellow card) 57'
RCB	6	(England) Faye White (c)
CB	18	(England) Anita Asante
LCB	5	(England) Leanne Champ
LWB	11	(England) Clare Wheatley
RCM	4	(Wales) Jayne Ludlow	(yellow card) 82'
LCM	8	(Republic of Ireland) Ciara Grant
CAM	10	(England) Ellen Maggs		(substituted off) 90+2'
FW	3	(Scotland) Julie Fleeting		(substituted off) 90+1'
FW	14	(England) Lianne Sanderson		(substituted off) 73'
Substitutes:
MF	7	(England) Sian Williams
FW	9	(England) Alex Scott		(substituted on) 90+1'
MF	22	(England) Jo Potter		(substituted on) 73'
DF	30	(England) Carol Harwood
FW	20	(England) Justine Lorton		(substituted on) 90+2'
Manager:
(England) Vic Akers

GK	1	(England) Pauline Cope	(yellow card) 88'
RB	7	(England) Danielle Murphy
RCB	2	(England) Casey Stoney (c)
LCB	5	(England) Karen Hills
LB	12	(England) Julie Fletcher		(substituted off) 70'
RW	15	(England) Jessica Smith		(substituted off) 81'
RCM	4	(England) Fara Williams
LCM	9	(England) Joanne Broadhurst
LW	14	(England) Ann-Marie Heatherson		(substituted off) 70'
FW	10	(England) Amanda Barr
FW	11	(England) Carmaine Walker
Substitutes:
GK	13	(England) Tania Law
MF	6	(England) Emma Coss		(substituted on) 70'
MF	8	(England) Alexa Hunn		(substituted on) 81'
FW	16	(England) Eni Aluko		(substituted on) 70'
DF	17	(England) Susan Rea
Manager:
(England) Keith Boanas

Player of the match
Julie Fleeting (Arsenal)

Assistant referees:
C. M. Turner
N. A. Walker
Fourth official:
J. J. Linington

Match rules

- 90 minutes.
- 30 minutes of extra-time if necessary.
- Penalty shoot-out if scores still level.
- Five named substitutes.
- Maximum of three substitutions.
