= 1998–99 FA Women's Cup =

Tournament details
- Country: England & Wales

Final positions
- Champions: Arsenal
- Runners-up: Southampton Saints
- Penalty shoot-outs do not count towards the total number of goals.

The 1998–99 FA Women's Cup was an association football knockout tournament for women's teams, held between 13 September 1998 and 3 May 1999. It was the 29th season of the FA Women's Cup and was won by Arsenal, who defeated Southampton Saints in the final.

The tournament consisted of one qualifying round and eight rounds of competition proper.

All match results and dates from the Women's FA Cup Website.

== Preliminary round ==
All games were played on 13 September 1998.

Tie	Home team (tier)	Score	Away team (tier)	Att.
1	Brazil Girls	3–1	Bolton Wanderers (Supporters)	
2	Brighouse	2–1	Thorpe United	
3	Corfe Hills United	1–5	Newport Strikers	
4	Kidderminster Harriers	2–0	Tamworth	
5	Lichfield Diamonds	0–2	Telford United	
6	Newton Aycliffe	0–11	AFC Preston	
7	Queens Park Rangers Ladies South	4–5	Newport Pagnell Town / United	
8	St Margaretsbury	0–3	Hewlett Packard Needham Market	
9	UG (United Glass) Sports	5–2 (a.e.t.)	Billericay Town	
10	Witney Town	0–8	Watford	
11	Woking	5–1	Tring Town	
12	Worksop Town	8–2	Lincoln City	

== First round proper ==
All games were scheduled for 21 and 27 September 1998.

Tie	Home team (tier)	Score	Away team (tier)	Att.
1	Abbey Rangers	3–5	Hampton	
2	Barking	3–3 (a.e.t.)	West Ham United	
replay	West Ham United	3–3 (5–3 p)	Barking	
3	Basingstoke Town	2–1	London Women	
4	Bedford Bells	7–0	King's Lynn	
5	Birmingham City	5–0	Belper Town	
6	Bishop's Stortford	0–15	Canary Racers	
7	Blackburn Rangers	1–10	Blackburn Rovers	
8	Bristol Rovers	2–0	Bristol City	
9	Bury	6–2	Deans	
10	Cam Bulldogs	10–3	North Molton Sports	
11	Camberley Town	6–0	Maidstone United	
12	Cambridge United	3–1 (a.e.t.)	Surbiton	
13	Charlton	11–0	Hendon	
14	Chelmsford City	H–W	Redhill	
Walkover for Chelmsford
15	Chesham United	3–1	Woking	
16	Chesterfield	9–0	Melton Mowbray	
17	Darlington	2–10	Stockport	
18	Doncaster Rovers	7–0	Kirklees	
19	Elmore Eagles	4–0	Clevedon	
20	Enfield	3–1	Queens Park Rangers	
21	Fulham	2–3 (a.e.t.)	Wembley Mill Hill	
22	Hassocks	6–0	Hastings Town	
23	Hemsworth Town	A–W	Ilkeston	
Walkover for Ilkeston
24	Hewlett Packard Needham Market	7–2	Welwyn Garden City	
25	Highfield Rangers	3–0	Bloxwich Town	
26	Keynsham Town	1–6	Okeford United	
27	Leeds Athletic	0–5	Preston AFC	
28	Leicester City	3–3 (a.e.t.)	Kidderminster Harriers	
replay	Kidderminster Harriers	2–1	Leicester City	
29	Liverpool Hope Feds	3–1	Hull City	
30	London Ladies	0–6	Haverhill Rovers	
31	Loughborough Students	9–1	Kettering Amazons	
32	Luton	2–4	Risborough Rangers	

Tie	Home team (tier)	Score	Away team (tier)	Att.
33	Malling	3–2	Hackney	
34	Manchester City	6–2	Brazil Girls	
35	Manchester United	5–1	Chorley	
36	Mond Rangers	0–7	Bangor City	
37	Newcastle	0–5	Oldham Athletic	
38	Newcastle Town	4–3	Derby County	
39	Newport Pagnell Town / United	3–4	Gillingham	
40	Newsham Park Hospital	3–1	Carlisle Wanderers	
41	Newton Abbot	A–W	Cardiff County	
Walkover for Cardiff County
42	Norton	0–6	Stockport County	
43	Oxford United	5–0	Barnstaple Town	
44	Plymouth Activate	A–W	Sherborne	
Walkover for Sherborne
45	Portsmouth	19–0	City of Gloucester	
46	Preston North End	3–5 (a.e.t.)	Middlesbrough	
47	Rea Valley Rovers	4–2	Atherstone United	
48	Redbridge Wanderers	0–2	Chelsea	
49	Rochdale	1–7	Leeds City Vixens	
50	Scunthorpe United	2–2 (a.e.t.)	Blackpool Wren Rovers	
replay	Blackpool Wren Rovers	2–1	Scunthorpe United	
51	Selby Town	0–1	Barnsley	
52	Shrewsbury Town	2–1	Worksop Town	
53	South Coast Rangers	4–1	Exeter Rangers	
54	Stanway	0–9	Denham United	
55	Steel City Wanderers	0–3	Nettleham	
56	Swindon Spitfires	1–4	Bath City	
57	Swindon Town	2–1	Newport Strikers	
58	Telford United	9–1	Stafford Rangers	
59	Teynham Gunners	4–3	Newham	
60	Tottenham Hotspur	6–1	Northampton Town & County	
61	Trafford	3–1	Brighouse	
62	Truro City	1–8	Saltash Pilgrims	
63	UG (United Glass) Sports	4–4 (a.e.t.)	Clapton	
replay	Clapton	2–0	UG (United Glass) Sports	
64	Walkern	2–3	Slough Town	
65	Warrington Grange	0–3	Stockport Celtic	
66	Watford	5–0	Dulwich Hamlet	
67	Wigan	4–2	Sheffield Hallam United	
68	Worcester City	0–3	Mansfield Town	

== Second round proper ==
All games were originally scheduled for 1 and 8 November 1998.

Tie	Home team (tier)	Score	Away team (tier)	Att.
1	Arnold Town	2–0	Loughborough Students	
2	Barnsley	2–3	Wigan	
3	Bath City	0–5	Barry Town	
4	Bedford Bells	3–0	Hassocks	
5	Birmingham City	2–3	Wolverhampton Wanderers	
6	Blackburn Rovers	5–4	Middlesbrough	
7	Blyth Spartans Kestrels	9–1	Manchester United	
8	Bristol Rovers	6–0	Okeford United	
9	Camberley Town	2–0	Gillingham	
10	Canary Racers	10–1	Haverhill Rovers	
11	Cardiff County	H–W	Cam Bulldogs	
Walkover for Cardiff County
12	Chelmsford City	1–1 (a.e.t.)	Watford	
replay	Watford	5–1	Chelmsford City	
13	Clapton	A–W	Brighton & Hove Albion	
Walkover for Brighton & Hove Albion
14	Coventry City	2–1	Chesterfield	
15	Denham United	6–0	Basingstoke Town	
16	Doncaster Rovers	5–1	Blackpool Wren Rovers	
17	Enfield	0–5	Langford	
18	Hampton	2–5	Chelsea	
19	Huddersfield Town	6–0	Preston AFC	
20	Ilkeston	6–3	Kidderminster Harriers	
21	Leeds United	2–3	Sheffield Wednesday	
22	Leyton Orient	H–W	Malling	
Walkover for Leyton Orient
23	Liverpool Hope Feds	1–4	Garswood Saints	

Tie	Home team (tier)	Score	Away team (tier)	Att.
24	Mansfield Town	1–1 (a.e.t.)	Shrewsbury Town	
replay	Shrewsbury Town	1–2	Mansfield Town	
25	Nettleham	0–3	Highfield Rangers	
26	Newsham Park Hospital	0–7	Leeds City Vixens	
27	Rea Valley Rovers	1–6	Aston Villa	
28	Reading Royals	7–1	Elmore Eagles	
29	Risborough Rangers	0–4	Whitehawk	
30	Saltash Pilgrims	6–2	Portsmouth	
31	Sherborne	1–4	Oxford United	
32	Slough Town	3–4	Chesham United	
33	Stockport	3–3 (a.e.t.)	Oldham Athletic	
replay	Oldham Athletic	4–3	Stockport	
34	Stockport Celtic	2–6	Manchester City	
35	Stockport County	1–4	Bangor City	
36	Swindon Town	4–1	South Coast Rangers	
37	Telford United	0–2	Newcastle Town	
38	Teynham Gunners	0–13	Charlton	
39	Three Bridges	4–1	Ipswich Town	
40	Tottenham Hotspur	7–0	Cambridge United	
41	Trafford	6–2	Bury	
42	Wembley Mill Hill	4–3	Barnet	
43	West Ham United	3–1	Hewlett Packard Needham Market	
44	Wimbledon	0–1	Berkhamsted Town	

== Third round proper ==
All games were originally scheduled for 6 and 13 December 1998.

Tie	Home team (tier)	Score	Away team (tier)	Att.
1	Arnold Town	2–0	Mansfield Town	
2	Bangor City	2–0	Garswood Saints	
3	Berkhamsted Town	3–1	Whitehawk	
4	Blackburn Rovers	4–2	Wigan	
5	Blyth Spartans Kestrels	H–W	Newcastle Town	
Walkover for Blyth Spartans Kestrels
6	Brighton & Hove Albion	4–2	Barry Town	
7	Bristol Rovers	4–2	Swindon Town	
8	Camberley Town	0–3	Canary Racers	
9	Cardiff County	0–2	Wembley Mill Hill	
10	Chelsea	1–0	Denham United	
11	Highfield Rangers	1–3	Coventry City	
12	Huddersfield Town	1–2	Wolverhampton Wanderers	

Tie	Home team (tier)	Score	Away team (tier)	Att.
13	Ilkeston	2–1	Manchester City	
14	Langford	4–1	Charlton	
15	Leeds City Vixens	3–0	Trafford	
16	Oldham Athletic	2–5	Aston Villa	
17	Reading Royals	9–2	Saltash Pilgrims	
18	Sheffield Wednesday	8–1	Doncaster Rovers	
19	Three Bridges	5–2	Leyton Orient	
20	Tottenham Hotspur	2–0	Oxford United	
21	Watford	9–0	Chesham United	
22	West Ham United	1–1 (a.e.t.)	Bedford Bells	
replay	Bedford Bells	2–0	West Ham United	

== Fourth round proper ==
All games were originally scheduled for 10, 17, 24 and 31 January 1999.

10 January 1999	Bangor City (3)	2–2 (a.e.t.)	Bedford Bells (3)
	Foster; Jones	Report	Goal

17 January 1999 Replay	Bedford Bells (3)	2–1	Bangor City (3)
	Beaston; Thomas	Report	Goal

10 January 1999	Brighton & Hove Albion (2)	2–1	Coventry City (2)
	Goal	Report	Goal

10 January 1999	Bristol Rovers (3)	2–5	Berkhamsted Town (2)
	17'; 88' (pen.)	Report	Lawrence 11'; Haley 63'; Payne; Wright 75', 82'

10 January 1999	Canary Racers (3)	0–6	Doncaster Belles (1)	10 January 1999
		Report	Exley 8'; Walker 30', 40', 60', 64'; Woodhead 78'

10 January 1999	Chelsea (3)	0–11	Arsenal (1)	Beaconsfield
		Report	Yankey; Lorton; Few; Spacey (pen.); Williams	Stadium: Holloways Park

10 January 1999	Leeds City Vixens (3)	1–2	Southampton Saints (1)
	Goal	Report	Goal

10 January 1999	Reading Royals (1)	7–2	Blackburn Rovers (3)	Reading
	Williams; Liran; Heapy; Woolcott; Abbott; Wilson	Report	Audra BatesBates 65'; Booker 70'	Stadium: Scours Lane

10 January 1999	Tottenham Hotspur (3)	0–1	Three Bridges (2)
		Report	Tagg 20'

10 January 1999	Watford (3)	3–1	Ilkeston Town (1)
	Goal	Report	Cox

17 January 1999	Everton (1)	4–2	Wembley Mill Hill (3)
	Burke; Easton; Jones	Report	Jenkins

17 January 1999	Tranmere Rovers (1)	2–1	Liverpool (1)	Heswall
	Shimin; Copeland	Report	Goal	Stadium: Gayton Park

17 January 1999	Wolverhampton Wanderers (2)	1–0	Bradford City (1)
	Macey 48'	Report

24 January 1999	Aston Villa (2)	0–1 (a.e.t.)	Millwall Lionesses (1)
		Report	Goal

24 January 1999	Langford (2)	5–0	Arnold Town (2)	Langford
	Whittick; O'Leary 37'; Chaffey; Oliver	Report		Stadium: Forde Park

31 January 1999	Blyth Spartans Kestrels (2)	1–3	Croydon (1)	Blyth
	Lanagham 90'	Report	Bampton; Broadhurst	Stadium: Croft Park

31 January 1999	Ilkeston (3)	0–4	Sheffield Wednesday (2)
		Report	Bailey; Newbold; D'Arcy

== Fifth round proper ==
All games were played on 7 February 1999.

7 February 1999	Arsenal (1)	1–0	Everton (1)	Borehamwood
	Spacey 75'	Report		Stadium: Meadow Park; Referee: Mr Hamilton

7 February 1999	Berkhamsted Town (2)	1–5	Southampton Saints (1)	Berkhamsted
	Lee 13'	Report	Bradley 22' (o.g.); 35'; 39'; 75'; 80'	Stadium: Broadwater

7 February 1999	Croydon (1)	1–0	Millwall Lionesses (1)	Croydon
	Hunt 85'	Report		Stadium: Croydon Sports Arena

7 February 1999	Langford (2)	0–1	Sheffield Wednesday (2)
		Report	Newbould

7 February 1999	Reading Royals (2)	1–0	Brighton & Hove Albion (2)
	Prowse 21'	Report

7 February 1999	Three Bridges (2)	0–1	Tranmere Rovers (1)	Three Bridges
		Report	Copeland 82'	Stadium: Jubilee Field

7 February 1999	Watford (3)	1–0	Bedford Bells (3)
	Spencer 7'	Report

7 February 1999	Wolverhampton Wanderers (2)	0–2	Doncaster Belles (1)
		Report	Woodhead 9'; Exley 80'

== Quarter–finals ==
All games were scheduled to be played on 7 March 1999. Doncaster Belles' tie with Croydon was re-arranged for 21 March 1999.

21 March 1999	Doncaster Belles (1)	2–0	Croydon (1)
	Exley; Walker	Report

7 March 1999	Reading Royals (2)	3–5	Tranmere Rovers (1)
	Prowse 49', 83'; Heapy 89'	Report	Garner 19', 47', 75'; Preston 63'; Smith 68'

7 March 1999	Sheffield Wednesday (2)	0–5	Southampton Saints (1)
		Report	Goal

7 March 1999	Watford (3)	1–5	Arsenal (1)
	Ray	Report	Spacey 9'; Grant 30'

== Semi–finals ==
All games were played on 4 April 1999.

4 April 1999	Arsenal (1)	2–0	Doncaster Belles (1)	Worksop
	Yankey	Report		Stadium: Sandy Lane; Attendance: 750

4 April 1999	Southampton Saints (1)	2–1	Tranmere Rovers (1)	Eastleigh
	Ritchie 39'; Stainer 61'	Report	Gardner	Stadium: Ten Acres; Attendance: 408; Referee: K. G. Barnes (Swindon)

== Final ==
3 May 1999
14:30 BST

Arsenal	2–0	Southampton Saints
Hayes 14' (o.g.); Wheatley 41'	Report

The Valley, London
Attendance: 6,450
Referee: Wendy Toms (Dorset)
