= Brian Broadhurst =

English footballer

Personal information
- Full name: Brian Walter Broadhurst
- Date of birth: 24 November 1938
- Place of birth: Sheffield, England
- Date of death: 2006 (aged 67–68)
- Place of death: Sheffield, England
- Position: Inside right

Senior career*
Years	Team	Apps	(Gls)
- Hallam
1961–1962	Chesterfield	7	(0)
- Lockheed Leamington
- Loughborough United
- Heanor Town

Managerial career
- 1991–1992: Doncaster Rovers (women)
- Croydon (women)
- * Club domestic league appearances and goals as of 22:30, 2 April 2012 (UTC)

Brian Walter Broadhurst (24 November 1938 – 2006) was an English professional footballer who played as a forward.

== Career ==
Born in Sheffield, Broadhurst made seven Football League appearances for Chesterfield in season 1961–62, after signing from Yorkshire Football League club Hallam.

Daughter Joanne Broadhurst played football for England women's national football team, while Brian helped with coaching at her clubs Doncaster Belles and Croydon.
