= Sarah Reed (footballer) =

English footballer

Personal information
- Date of birth: 12 May 1980 (age 46)
- Position: Goalkeeper

College career
Years	Team	Apps	(Gls)
1999–2001	Lynn Fighting Knights	54	(0)

Senior career*
Years	Team	Apps	(Gls)
- Mill Hill
1995–1996	Wembley		
1996–1999	Arsenal		

International career^{‡}
1997–1999	England	4	(0)
- * Club domestic league appearances and goals ‡ National team caps and goals as of 14:54, 24 September 2022 (UTC)

Sarah Reed (born 12 May 1980) is a former England women's international footballer who played as a goalkeeper. Her greatest achievement was playing in the winning games of the 1998 FA Women's Cup Final and 1999 FA Women's Cup Final with Arsenal.

== Club career ==
Reed was an unused substitute for Wembley when they won the 1995–96 FA Women's Premier League Cup final, beating Doncaster Belles on penalties at Underhill Stadium.

Reed won the Women's FA Cup twice during her career, both with Arsenal. In 1998 they beat Croydon 3-2 at the New Den and in 1999 they beat Southampton Saints 2-0 at The Valley.

== International career ==
Reed won four caps for England, at a time when she was an understudy to Pauline Cope. She was called up for the first time by Ted Copeland as a 16-year-old Wembley player for a UEFA Women's Euro 1997 qualifying fixture against Portugal at Griffin Park on 19 May 1996. She appeared as a substitute for Cope in a 6–0 friendly defeat by the United States in Portland, Oregon, on 11 May 1997. In August that year she played versus Scotland. She made another substitute appearance for Cope in a 4–1 1999 FIFA Women's World Cup qualification playoff win in Romania on 13 September 1998. Her final England cap came as a substitute for Rachel Brown in a 4–1 friendly defeat by Italy in Bologna on 26 May 1999.

In November 2022, Reed was recognized by The Football Association as one of the England national team's legacy players, and as the 124th women's player to be capped by England.

== Honours ==
Arsenal

- FA Women's Cup: 1998, 1999
