= Finger Lakes Heartbreakers =

The Finger Lakes Heartbreakers were a W-League club based in Syracuse, New York. The team folded after the 1998 season.

== Year-by-year ==
Year	Division	League	Reg. season	Playoffs
1998	2	USL W-League W2	2nd, North Division	lost in Divisional playoffs
