= Carol Harwood =

English footballer

Personal information
- Position: Defender

Senior career*
| Years | Team | Apps | (Gls) |
- Arsenal

International career
| | England | 6 | (0) |
- * Club domestic league appearances and goals

Carol Harwood is a former England women's international footballer. She won the Women's FA Cup four times in her career with Arsenal.

== Club career ==
Whilst playing for Arsenal, Harwood won the 1998 FA Women's Cup Final with victory over Croydon at the New Den. She won for a second time in 1999 with a 2-0 victory over Southampton Saints and for a third time in 2001 against Fulham at Selhurst Park. Harwood was an unused substitute in the 2004 final which saw Arsenal defeat Charlton at Loftus Road.

== International career ==
In November 2022, Harwood was recognized by The Football Association as one of the England national team's legacy players, and as the 83nd women's player to be capped by England.

== Honours ==
Arsenal

- FA Women's Cup: 1998, 1999, 2001, 2004
