= Roser Serra =

Spanish footballer (born 1971)

Personal information
- Full name: Maria Roser Serra Carandell
- Date of birth: 30 August 1971 (age 55)
- Place of birth: Barcelona, Spain
- Position: Goalkeeper

Senior career*
Years	Team	Apps	(Gls)
- Club Femení Barcelona
1995–1996	Arsenal		

International career^{‡}
1990–1998	Spain	33	(0)
- * Club domestic league appearances and goals as of 12:00, 15 September 2011 (UTC) ‡ National team caps and goals as of 12:00, 15 September 2011 (UTC)

Maria Roser Serra Carandell (born 30 August 1971) is a Spanish former international football goalkeeper.

Serra represented Spain at senior international level. During qualifying for UEFA Women's Euro 1997, she kept goal in a 1–1 draw in Sweden as well as in an 8–0 home defeat in the return fixture. In September 1996 Serra was Player of the Match as Spain eliminated England in the play–off. She was selected for the final tournament and played in Spain's 2–1 defeat to Italy in the semi–final. Serra collected a total of 33 caps.

On the club level Serra spent a period playing semi–professionally with Arsenal in London, before returning to Barcelona.
