= 1996–97 FA Women's Premier League =

FA Women's Premier League
- Season: 1996–97

The 1996–97 FA Women's Premier League season was the 6th season of the FA Women's Premier League.

== National Division ==
FA Women's Premier League National Division
- Season: 1996–97
- Champions: Arsenal; 3rd title
- Relegated: Southampton Saints; Ilkeston Town
- Matches: 90
- Goals: 318 (3.53 per match)
- Top goalscorer: Joanne Broadhurst (21)
- Biggest home win: Arsenal 7–0 Southampton Saints (3 November 1996)
- Biggest away win: Southampton Saints 0–9 Arsenal (26 January 1997)
- Highest scoring: Everton 7–3 Ilkeston Town (13 April 1997)
- Longest unbeaten run: Arsenal (17)

Locations of the FA Women's Premier League National Division Teams
Locations of the FA Women's Premier League National Division Teams (Greater London)

Changes from last season:

- Tranmere Rovers were promoted from the Northern Division
- Southampton Saints were promoted from the Southern Division
- Villa Aztecs were relegated to the Northern Division
- Wolverhampton Wanderers were relegated to the Northern Division

=== League table ===
Pos	Team	Pld	W	D	L	GF	GA	GD	Pts	Qualification or relegation
1	Arsenal (C)	18	16	1	1	65	9	+56	49	
2	Doncaster Belles	18	13	2	3	44	15	+29	41	
3	Croydon	18	9	4	5	39	26	+13	31	
4	Liverpool	18	9	3	6	30	16	+14	30	
5	Millwall Lionesses	18	7	6	5	20	19	+1	27	
6	Everton	18	8	3	7	36	36	0	27	
7	Wembley	18	6	4	8	26	27	−1	22	
8	Tranmere Rovers	18	3	3	12	23	48	−25	12	
9	Southampton Saints (R)	18	3	0	15	16	61	−45	9	Relegation to the Southern Division
10	Ilkeston Town (R)	18	1	4	13	14	56	−42	7	Relegation to the Northern Division

Source: FA WPL
(C) Champions; (R) Relegated

=== Results ===
Home \ Away	ARS	CRO	DON	EVE	ILK	LIV	MIL	SOU	TRA	WEM
Arsenal	—	2–1	3–2	4–1	4–0	3–0	6–0	7–0	4–2	3–0
Croydon	0–2	—	5–2	2–2	6–0	1–0	2–1	2–0	3–3	2–3
Doncaster Belles	1–0	4–1	—	0–0	4–1	1–0	0–1	6–0	5–1	1–0
Everton	1–5	1–1	0–4	—	7–3	3–1	1–0	4–1	4–0	1–3
Ilkeston Town	0–3	0–3	0–4	2–3	—	0–3	1–2	1–4	1–3	1–7
Liverpool	0–2	4–1	1–2	2–0	0–0	—	0–0	1–0	1–0	3–1
Millwall Lionesses	0–4	0–0	0–0	3–0	0–0	0–2	—	2–1	5–0	1–1
Southampton Saints	0–9	0–2	1–4	2–5	2–3	1–6	0–2	—	1–0	0–3
Tranmere Rovers	0–3	2–4	1–3	1–2	1–1	0–5	1–1	4–1	—	1–3
Wembley	1–1	0–3	0–1	2–1	0–0	1–1	0–2	0–2	1–3	—

Source: FA WPL
Legend: Blue = home team win; Yellow = draw; Red = away team win.

=== Top goalscorers ===
Rank	Scorer	Club	Goals
1	Joanne Broadhurst	Arsenal	21
2	Karen Walker	Doncaster Belles	18
3	Kerry Davis	Croydon	13
4	Louise Thomas	Everton	12
5	Vicky Exley	Doncaster Belles	11
5	Andrea McGrady	Everton	11
5	Kelly Smith	Arsenal	11
6	Hope Powell	Croydon	10
6	Marieanne Spacey	Arsenal	10
7	Sue Smith	Tranmere Rovers	9
8	Karen Burke	Liverpool	8
8	Shirley Oakford	Liverpool	8
9	Kara Reynolds	Arsenal	7
9	Rachel Yankey	Arsenal	7

== Northern Division ==
FA Women's Premier League Northern Division
- Season: 1996–97
- Champions: Bradford City
- Promoted: Bradford City
- Matches: 72
- Goals: 307 (4.26 per match)
- Biggest home win: Bradford City 8–0 Notts County
- Biggest away win: Notts County 0–8 Bradford City
- Longest winless run: Notts County (16)

Map showing the locations of the teams in the Northern Division of the FA Women's Premier League
Map showing the locations of the teams in the Northern Division of the FA Women's Premier League

Changes from last season:

- Tranmere Rovers were promoted to the National Division
- Bradford City were promoted to the Northern Division
- Langford were transferred to the Southern Division
- Villa Aztecs were relegated from the National Division
- Wolverhampton Wanderers were relegated from the National Division
- Garswood St Helens United became Garswood Saints
- RTM Newcastle Kestrels became Blyth Spartans Kestrals
- Kidderminster Harriers became Stourport Swifts
- Town & County became Town & County Diamonds

=== League table ===
Pos	Team	Pld	W	D	L	GF	GA	GD	Pts	Promotion or relegation
1	Bradford City (C, P)	16	15	0	1	56	13	+43	45	Promotion to the National Division
2	Aston Villa	16	12	1	3	50	15	+35	37	
3	Blyth Spartans Kestrels	16	9	2	5	40	25	+15	29	
4	Huddersfield Town	16	8	3	5	37	32	+5	27	
5	Wolverhampton Wanderers	16	7	1	8	30	29	+1	22	
6	Sheffield Wednesday	16	4	4	8	25	36	−11	16	
7	Garswood Saints	16	3	5	8	26	29	−3	14	
8	Stourport Swifts	16	3	2	11	22	60	−38	11	
9	Notts County	16	0	4	12	21	68	−47	4	
10	Bronte (X)	0	0	0	0	0	0	0	0	Club dissolved in November. All results expunged for this season.

Source: WPL
(C) Champions; (P) Promoted; (X) ?

Bronte withdrew in November, all records from that season were expunged.

=== Results ===
Home \ Away	ASV	BSK	BRC	BRO	GAS	HUT	NOC	SHW	STS	WOW
Aston Villa	—	3–3	0–1	X–X	2–1	1–2	5–2	5–0	3–0	3–0
Blyth Spartans Kestrels	0–1	—	0–2	X–X	3–1	3–3	4–2	0–1	5–0	3–2
Bradford City	2–1	5–1	—	X–X	4–2	4–1	8–0	1–0	4–0	3–2
Bronte	X–X	X–X	X–X	—	X–X	X–X	X–X	X–X	X–X	X–X
Garswood Saints	1–2	2–5	1–2	X–X	—	0–1	2–2	0–0	4–1	0–1
Huddersfield Town	0–6	0–1	1–3	X–X	1–1	—	7–2	2–2	4–2	1–0
Notts County	2–4	0–1	0–8	X–X	2–2	0–3	—	2–2	1–4	0–5
Sheffield Wednesday	0–4	3–0	0–2	X–X	2–2	3–4	7–2	—	5–2	3–2
Stourport Swifts	1–7	0–6	1–6	X–X	0–5	1–6	1–1	1–3	—	1–1
Wolverhampton Wanderers	0–3	3–1	3–1	X–X	2–1	3–1	4–3	1–0	2–4	—

Source: WPL
Legend: Blue = home team win; Yellow = draw; Red = away team win.

== Southern Division ==
FA Women's Premier League Southern Division
- Season: 1996–97
- Champions: Berkhamsted Town
- Promoted: Berkhamsted Town
- Relegated: Oxford United
- Matches: 90
- Goals: 370 (4.11 per match)
- Biggest home win: Wimbledon 8–0 Leyton Orient (23 February 1997)
- Biggest away win: Oxford United 0–7 Berkhamsted Town (26 January 1997)
- Highest scoring: Brighton & Hove Albion; 9–2 Oxford United (8 September 1996)

Map showing the locations of the teams in the Southern Division of the FA Women's Premier League
Map showing the locations of the teams in the Division One South of the WFA National League (Greater London)

Changes from last season:

- Southampton Saints were promoted to the National Division
- Whitehawk were promoted to the Southern Division
- Langford were transferred from the Northern Division
- Brentford were relegated from the Southern Division

=== League table ===
Pos	Team	Pld	W	D	L	GF	GA	GD	Pts	Promotion or relegation
1	Berkhamsted Town (C, P)	18	14	2	2	57	16	+41	44	Promotion to the National Division
2	Brighton & Hove Albion	18	13	2	3	59	33	+26	41	
3	Whitehawk	18	12	1	5	39	17	+22	37	
4	Wimbledon	18	10	2	6	65	28	+37	32	
5	Three Bridges	18	7	5	6	36	27	+9	26	
6	Langford	18	7	5	6	28	33	−5	26	
7	Ipswich Town	18	5	4	9	24	26	−2	19	
8	Leyton Orient	18	3	4	11	27	50	−23	13	
9	Town & County Diamonds	18	2	3	13	18	65	−47	9	
10	Oxford United (R)	18	2	2	14	17	75	−58	8	Relegation

Source: FA WPL
(C) Champions; (P) Promoted; (R) Relegated

=== Results ===
Home \ Away	BET	BHA	IPT	LAN	LEO	OXU	THB	TCD	WHI	WIM
Berkhamsted Town	—	1–0	2–0	3–0	3–1	5–0	4–0	6–1	4–0	4–2
Brighton & Hove Albion	5–3	—	4–2	3–0	4–3	9–2	1–1	6–2	2–3	2–1
Ipswich Town	0–1	2–2	—	0–0	3–1	0–0	0–4	1–2	0–1	1–2
Langford	2–2	1–6	2–0	—	1–6	7–0	0–4	1–1	1–1	0–3
Leyton Orient	1–1	1–2	0–1	0–3	—	3–3	1–1	5–1	1–3	0–6
Oxford United	0–7	0–4	0–5	0–1	1–2	—	1–4	3–1	0–5	1–7
Three Bridges	0–2	2–3	1–2	1–1	4–1	0–2	—	2–0	2–0	4–2
Town & County Diamonds	0–5	0–3	0–4	1–4	1–1	5–2	2–2	—	0–5	0–7
Whitehawk	1–0	2–3	2–1	0–1	4–0	4–0	2–0	4–0	—	2–1
Wimbledon	3–4	7–0	1–1	2–3	8–0	6–2	3–3	3–1	1–0	—

Source: FA WPL
Legend: Blue = home team win; Yellow = draw; Red = away team win.
