= Robyn Davies-Patrick =

New Zealand footballer

Personal information
- Full name: Robyn Davies-Patrick
- Date of birth: 29 August 1975 (age 51)

International career
Years	Team	Apps	(Gls)
1994–1996	New Zealand	4	(0)

Robyn Davies-Patrick is a former association football player who represented New Zealand at international level.

Davies-Patrick made her Football Ferns début in a 0–1 loss to Bulgaria on 24 August 1994, and finished her international career with four caps to her credit.

Robyn played for Arsenal Ladies between 1996–1997.
