= Kirsty Pealling =

English footballer

Personal information
- Full name: Kirsty Pealling
- Date of birth: 14 April 1975 (age 51)
- Place of birth: Hackney, England
- Height: 1.65 m (5 ft 5 in)
- Position: Right-back

Senior career*
Years	Team	Apps	(Gls)
1987–2006	Arsenal		

International career^{‡}
1993–2004	England	17	(0)
- * Club domestic league appearances and goals ‡ National team caps and goals as of 12 October 2010

Kirsty Pealling (born 14 April 1975) is a former footballer who spent her entire club career with Arsenal. She also represented England at full international level.

== Club career ==
Pealling attended Haggerston School and was spotted by Arsenal Ladies manager Vic Akers during a five-a-side tournament when she was 13. At the time of her retirement in 2006, Pealling was the club's longest serving player, the record appearance holder and had won the most trophies. She won domestic trebles with Arsenal in 1993 and 2001.

Pealling worked as a sports development officer for Camden Council and since 2004 has coached at Hampstead FC.

When Jayne Ludlow retired in July 2013, the legendary Welsh midfielder paid tribute to "unsung hero" Pealling in an interview with the Arsenal website: "I should really thank Kirsty because when I was scoring 30 goals a season, it was mostly because of her crosses from the right wing."

Pealling is featured in the "Remember Who You Are" artwork added to the Emirates in 2023.

== International career ==
Eighteen-year-old Pealling made her England debut in a 3–0 Euro 1995 qualifying win in Belgium in November 1993. She also featured in the eventual semi-final defeat to Germany. However, Pealling and Joanne Broadhurst were controversially dropped from the 1995 FIFA Women's World Cup squad, with manager Ted Copeland saying "They are not international footballers at this level."

After a long spell out of international football, Pealling returned as a substitute against Denmark in August 2001. In May 2004 she played the first half of a 1–0 friendly win over Iceland at London Road, Peterborough.

She has the England legacy number 99. The FA announced their legacy numbers scheme to honour the 50th anniversary of England’s inaugural international.

== Honours ==
Arsenal

- FA Women's Premier League: 1992–93, 1994–95, 1996–97, 2000–01, 2001–02, 2003–04, 2004–05, 2005–06
- FA Cup: 1992–93, 1994–95, 1997–98, 1998–99, 2000–01, 2003–04, 2005–06
- FA Women's National League Cup: 1991–92, 1992–93, 1993–94, 1997–98, 1998–99, 1999–2000, 2000–01, 2004–5
- FA Women's Community Shield: 2000, 2001, 2005
- London County FA Women's Cup: 1994–95, 1995–96, 1996–97, 1999–2000, 2003–04
