= Natasha Daly =

English footballer

Personal information
- Date of birth: 29 March 1979 (age 47)
- Position: Forward

Senior career*
Years	Team	Apps	(Gls)
–1996	Mill Hill United		
1996–1999	Arsenal		
1999–	Wembley Mill Hill		

International career
1997–1998	England	3	(0)
- * Club domestic league appearances and goals

Natasha Daly (born 29 November 1979) is a former England women's international footballer. In 1996 she signed for Arsenal from Mill Hill United. Her greatest achievement was playing in the winning games of the 1998 FA Women's Cup Final with Arsenal. In 1999, she left Arsenal, and returned to her former club, now called Wembley Mill Hill.

== International career ==
In November 2022, Daly was recognized by The Football Association as one of the England national team's legacy players, and as the 122nd women's player to be capped by England.

== Honours ==
Arsenal

- FA Women's Cup: 1998
