= Wendy Toms =

English football referee

- Full name: Wendy Ann Toms
- Born: 16 October 1962 (age 64); Dorset, England
- Other occupation: Parcel post manager

Domestic
Years	League	Role
1994–1997	Football League	Asst. referee
1996–2007	Football Conference	Referee
1997–2005	Premier League	Asst. referee

International
Years	League	Role
2000–2005	FIFA listed (women)	Referee

Wendy Ann Toms (born 16 October 1962) is an English former football referee who officiated in the Football League and then the Premier League, both as an assistant referee. She was the first female ever to fulfil such roles at those levels. She also served for FIFA on the women's international list.

== Career ==
Tom, from Broadstone, Dorset, also worked as a parcel post manager, as of 1996. took up refereeing in the late 1980s, and progressed to become a reserve (now "fourth") official in the Football League in 1991 for the AFC Bournemouth versus Reading match in the old Third Division, which was then unique for a female. She was the first woman to be included on the list of Football League assistant referees when she was chosen for the 1994–95 season, and became a referee in the Football Conference two seasons later, creating another precedent when she took charge of the game between Kidderminster and Nuneaton Borough her first Conference match as referee. Almost a year after that, she operated as an assistant referee in the Premier League, again, the first female ever to do so.

Two years after her debut in that league, and having 'run the line' for referee Steve Dunn during Leeds United's 4–3 Premiership away win at Coventry City on 11 September 1999, she was roundly criticised by the then Coventry manager, Gordon Strachan, who said in an interview with The Independent newspaper: "We are getting PC decisions about promoting ladies. It does not matter if they are ladies, men or Alsatian dogs. If they are not good enough to run the line they should not get the job. Saturday's was the worst assistant refereeing decision I have seen this season by far and I've said that in my report. The fourth Leeds goal was offside by at least four yards and there were numerous other bad decisions in the game. My message is don't be politically correct and promote people just for the sake of it." However, the president of the Referees' Association at the time, Peter Willis, replied: "She's a very good official...I think the situation is very sad. As a manager of a football club, Strachan is responsible for his players and he is entitled to his opinion on the performance of the officials, but to talk about the sex of the official is irrelevant."

Toms' highest domestic honour was being appointed as an assistant for the Football League Cup Final between Leicester City and Tranmere Rovers at Wembley on 27 February 2000, when the referee was Alan Wilkie. Leicester won 2–1, with Toms indicating offside at one point to cause the Tranmere (and former Leicester) player David Kelly's "equalising goal" to be disallowed. She was also an assistant referee in two matches at the 2000 Olympic Games, having been selected by FIFA to operate on their women's international list.

She took charge of the UEFA Women's Cup quarter-final first leg on 30 October 2003 between Brøndby IF of Denmark and Gomrukçu Baku of Azerbaijan, with the Danish side running out 9–0 winners.

Toms refereed one match at the 2005 UEFA Women's Championship in England. This was the Group B match at Deepdale in Preston on 6 June 2005, between France and Italy, which finished 3–1 to the French.

In 2007, Toms was refereeing in the Football Conference.

Toms was also named in derogatory fashion during the Richard Keys and Andy Gray rant regarding women officiating elite football matches in late 2010, which cost the two broadcasters their jobs.

== See also ==
- Sian Massey
- Amy Rayner
- List of football referees
- Women's association football
