= Tina Mapes =

English footballer and coach

Personal information
- Full name: Tina Ann Mapes
- Date of birth: 21 January 1971 (age 55)
- Place of birth: Maidstone, England
- Positions: Defender; midfielder

Senior career*
Years	Team	Apps	(Gls)
–1989	LFC Reigate		
1989–1991	Millwall Lionesses		
1991–1992	Wimbledon		
1992–1993	Lindsdals IF		
1994–1997	Croydon		
1997–1999	Arsenal		
1999–2000	Croydon		

International career^{‡}
1989-1997	England	19	(0)
- * Club domestic league appearances and goals ‡ National team caps and goals as of 13:08, 18 March 2025 (UTC)

Tina Ann Mapes (born 21 January 1971) is an English football coach and former player, who represented the England women's national football team at senior international level. She played for England in the 1995 FIFA Women's World Cup finals. She won the Women's FA Cup five times.

== Playing career ==
=== Club ===
Mapes played with Reigate in the Sussex Martlet League, then signed for Millwall Lionesses in the Greater London League. Winning club Player of the Year in her first season, 1989–90, Mapes was also part of the Millwall team which won the 1991 Women's FA Cup when they defeated Doncaster Belles 1‍–‍0 at Prenton Park.

Millwall's squad broke up in the aftermath of that success and Mapes began 1991–92 with Wimbledon. Before the end of the season, the first with a National league structure in England, Mapes was scouted by Swedish second-level club Lindsdals IF. She joined the Swedes on a semi–pro basis, linking up with former Millwall teammate Karen Farley.

In 1994 Mapes was brought back to England by Croydon, whose player–manager Debbie Bampton was another member of Millwall's 1991 FA Cup winning team. Playing as a sweeper or central midfielder, Mapes helped her new club to a League and Cup double in 1996. Mapes converted her kick in the penalty shootout in the 1996 FA Women's Cup final win over Liverpool at the New Den. In the following year's competition, Mapes missed as Croydon lost a semi–final shootout to Millwall.

In 1997 Mapes signed for champions Arsenal. In the 1997–98 FA Women's Premier League Cup Mapes took part in another semi–final shootout, this time as an emergency goalkeeper after Arsenal's Sarah Reed had been sent off. Arsenal edged out Bradford City and Mapes collected another winner's medal when Arsenal beat Croydon 4–3 on penalties in the final, after the match had finished 0–0. Mapes was an unused substitute in the 1999 FA Women's Cup final as Arsenal beat Southampton Saints 2‍–‍0. She won the FA Cup for a fifth time in 2000 when Croydon Women beat Doncaster Belles 2-1 at Bramall Lane. Mapes came on as a late substitute.

=== National team ===
Mapes captained the Women's Football Association (WFA) England U–21 team. She made her senior debut before the Football Association (FA) took over women's football in 1993, but dropped out of contention while playing in Sweden.

She was given number 78 when the FA announced their legacy numbers scheme to honour the 50th anniversary of England's inaugural international.

== Coaching career ==
Mapes also has an UEFA A Licence in coaching working with many local clubs, she also tutors for the FA delivering level 1&2 coaching courses.

== Honours ==
Arsenal

- FA Cup: 1998–99
