= Clare Wheatley =

English footballer and administrator

Personal information
- Date of birth: 4 February 1971 (age 55)
- Place of birth: London, England
- Position: Wing back

Senior career*
Years	Team	Apps	(Gls)
–1993	Sheffield Wednesday		
1993–1995	Chelsea		
1995–2001	Arsenal		
2004–2005	Arsenal		

International career
1996	England	1	(0)
- * Club domestic league appearances and goals

Clare Wheatley (born 4 February 1971) is an English football administrator and former player for Arsenal Ladies who played as a wing back.

== Playing career ==
Wheatley started playing football at her grammar school before the school banned its pupils from playing football. When she was studying to be a Physical Education teacher at Sheffield City Polytechnic, she joined Sheffield Wednesday Ladies. In 1993, she played for Chelsea Ladies. In 1995, after a successful training camp, she joined Arsenal Ladies and was reminded by manager Vic Akers "Arsenal Ladies is not a social club". A year later she made her debut for the England women's national football team as a substitute. In 1997, she suffered an anterior cruciate ligament injury in a match against Millwall Lionesses, which meant she could not play for a whole season nor do her job as a PE teacher, but she returned in 1998. Following her return, she did not receive another England call-up. In 2001, following an injury playing against Doncaster Belles, Wheatley was forced to retire. In 2004, she came out of retirement to play two more seasons for Arsenal before again retiring from playing in 2005.

She was allotted 115 when the FA announced their legacy numbers scheme to honour the 50th anniversary of England’s inaugural international.

== Administration ==
During Wheatley's time injured in 1997, Akers had been appointed as kitman for Arsenal, so she could take over his role as club development officer. When she had to give up playing, she remained as the club's development officer. In 2014, when Akers retired, Wheatley succeeded him as the General Manager of Arsenal Ladies. In 2020, Arsenal Women were fined £50,000 for discrimination after it was found by a Football Association tribunal that Wheatley had fired a youth coach who had been diagnosed with autism.

== Honours ==
Arsenal

- FA Cup: 1998–99, 2000-01, 2003-04
