= Sian Williams (footballer) =

English footballer, manager and leader

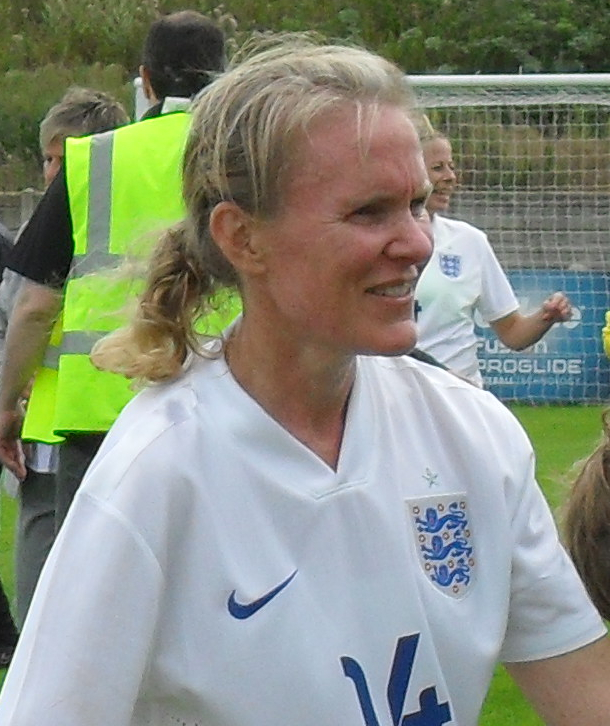
- Sian Williams in 2015

Personal information
- Full name: Sian Williams
- Date of birth: 2 February 1968 (age 58)
- Place of birth: Camborne, Cornwall, England
- Position: Midfielder

Senior career*
Years	Team	Apps	(Gls)
1981–1988	Millwall Lionesses		
1988–1990	Juve Siderno		
1990–2004	Arsenal	123	
2004–2006	Charlton Athletic		
2006–2007	Watford		

International career^{‡}
1985	Wales	1	
1992–2000	England	20	(0)

Managerial career
- 2000–2003: Wales
- 2006–2009: Watford
- 2025–: Stevenage
- * Club domestic league appearances and goals as of 14:38, 1 May 2010 (UTC) ‡ National team caps and goals as of 12:12, 18 March 2025 (UTC)

Sian Williams (born 2 February 1968) is an English former footballer who played as a midfielder. She spent 14 years with Arsenal, winning numerous trophies and captaining the club for six years. At international level, she represented both England and Wales. Towards the end of her career, she began coaching, and was appointed manager of Wales, while still a member of the Arsenal squad. She was initially player-manager of Watford Ladies, before retiring to take the job full-time.

== Club career ==
Williams played at club level for Millwall Lionesses and spent two years in Italy with Juve Siderno. She signed for Arsenal Ladies in 1990, from where she joined Charlton Athletic Ladies in September 2004.

In her 14 years at Arsenal, Williams amassed numerous trophies. She was involved in every League and Cup triumph during her time with the club, including six league titles, seven League Cups, and six FA Cups. She served as captain for six years. After winning a first treble in 1993, Williams captained the Gunners to their domestic treble in 2001. She also appeared in the first edition of the UEFA Women's Champions League in the 2001–02 season, reaching the quarterfinals with Arsenal.

Williams won the FA Cup with Charlton Ladies in 2005.

Williams is featured in the "Remember Who You Are" artwork added to the Emirates Stadium in 2023.

== International career ==
In 1985, she earned a senior cap for Wales, before switching to represent England. Williams played for both England and Wales at international level. She was a non-playing member of England's 1995 FIFA Women's World Cup squad. Williams made twenty appearances for England between 1993 and 2000.

She was allotted 97 when the FA announced their legacy numbers scheme to honour the 50th anniversary of England's inaugural international.

== Coaching career ==
Williams joined the coaching staff at Arsenal's Centre of Excellence, later taking on a similar role at Watford, before becoming the manager of the Welsh national team in 2000.

In May 2003, Williams was highly critical of the Football Association of Wales (FAW) for pulling the women's team out of the 2005 UEFA Women's Championship qualification tournament.

Williams became manager of Watford Ladies in the 2006 close season and led the side to promotion to the FA Women's Premier League at the end of the campaign. She stood down from the post in November 2009.

On 31 May 2025, Stevenage FC Women announced the appointment of Sian Lingham (née Williams) as the club's new head coach ahead of the 2025–26 season. Her appointment marks a significant step in the club's ambition to strengthen its women's programme.

== Personal life ==
Williams' father was Alan Williams, the British Labour Party politician. She worked as a maths teacher during her career as a football player and coach.

== Honours ==
Arsenal

- FA Women's Premier League: 1992–93, 1994–95, 1996–97, 2000–01, 2001–02, 2003–04
- FA Cup: 1991–92, 1992–93, 1994–95, 1997–98, 1998–99, 2000–01, 2003–04
- FA Women's National League Cup: 1991–92, 1992–93, 1993–94, 1997–98, 1998–99, 1999–2000, 2000–01
- FA Women's Community Shield: 2000, 2001
- London County FA Women's Cup: 1994–95, 1995–96, 1996–97, 1999–2000, 2003–04

Charlton Athletic

- FA Cup: 2004-05
