= Kim Jerray-Silver =

English footballer

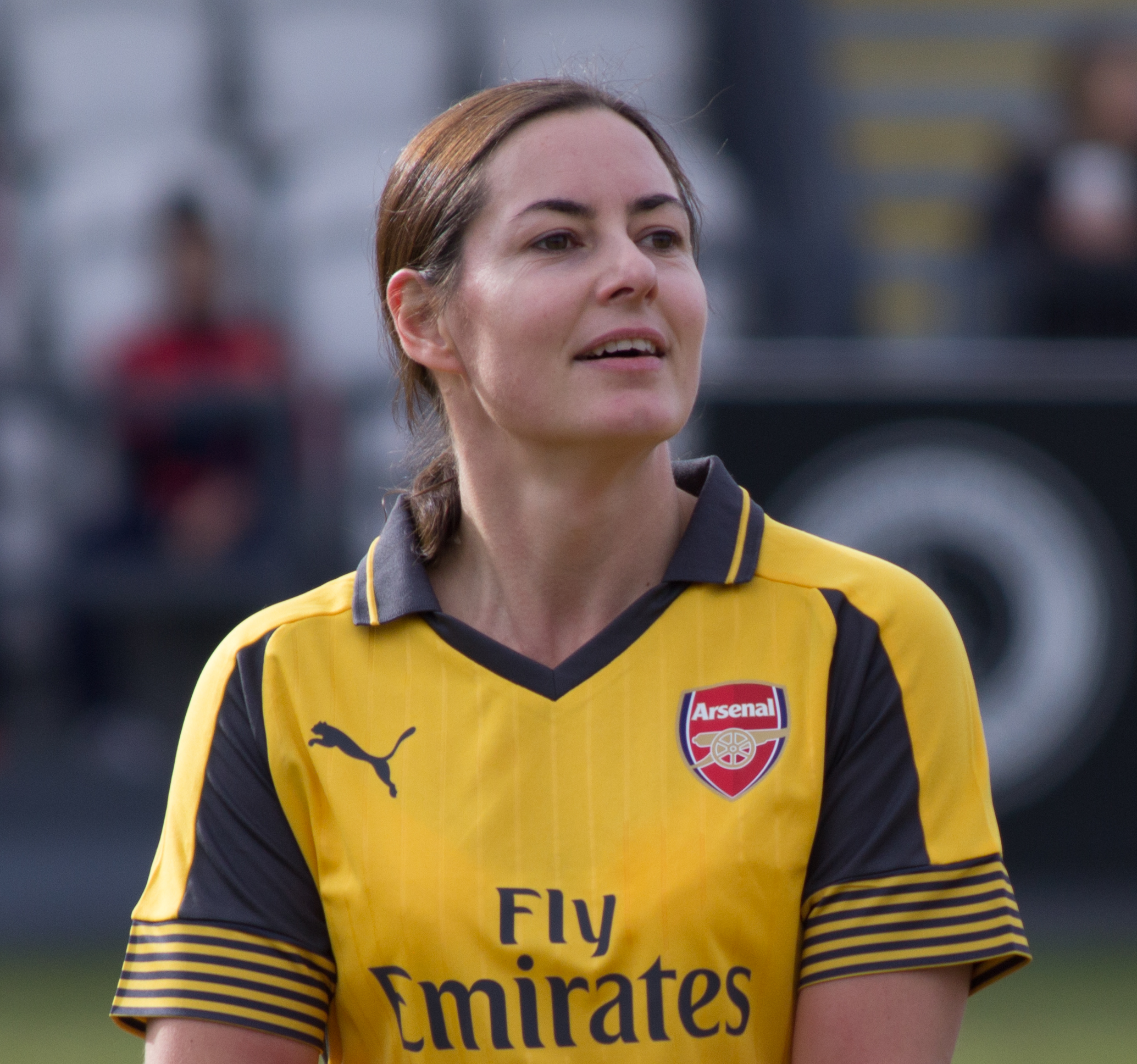
- Jerray-Silver in 2017

Personal information
- Full name: Kimberley Jerray-Silver
- Date of birth: 6 October 1977 (age 49)
- Place of birth: Hillingdon, England
- Positions: Defender; midfielder

Senior career*
Years	Team	Apps	(Gls)
–1996	Wembley		
1996–1999	Arsenal		
1999–2005	Fulham		

International career
1996	England	1	(0)
- * Club domestic league appearances and goals

Kimberley Jerray-Silver (born 10 June 1977) is a former English professional footballer and firefighter. She most recently played as a defender for Fulham.

== Club career ==
Jerray-Silver won the 1995–96 FA Women's Premier League Cup with Wembley Ladies. In the final against Doncaster Belles, she came on as a second-half substitute. The game finished 2–2 before Wembley won on penalties.

Jerray-Silver went on to play for Arsenal and was part of their treble-winning team in the 1997-98 season.

Jerray-Silver then transferred to Fulham, becoming one of Europe's first female professional footballers. In the 2003 League Cup final Jerray-Silver scored the winning penalty in a shoot-out against her former team, Arsenal, to secure Fulham their second consecutive title.

== International career ==
In May 1996 Jerray-Silver won a solitary England cap in a 3–0 Euro qualifying win over Portugal at Griffin Park.

Jerray-Silver was given number 117 when the FA announced their legacy numbers scheme to honour the 50th anniversary of England’s inaugural international.

== After football ==
Jerray-Silver became a firefighter, joining the London Fire Brigade in 2005. She was among the first on the scene at Edgware Road during the 7 July 2005 London bombings.

In 2020, she received the Women in the Fire Service Bright Light Award for her work supporting elderly people in her local area. In July 2025, Jerray-Silver was awarded the British Citizen Award Medal of Honour for Services to the Community (BCAc), in recognition of her contributions to the local community in Ealing. The award was presented at the Palace of Westminster on 24 July 2025.
