= Kelley Few =

English footballer

Senior career*
| Years | Team | Apps | (Gls) |
- Arsenal

International career
| 1996-1997 | England | 4 | (0) |
- * Club domestic league appearances and goals

Kelley Few is a former England women's international footballer. Few's greatest achievement was scoring the winning goal in the 1998 FA Women's Cup Final with Arsenal.

== International career ==
In November 2022, Few was recognized by The Football Association as one of the England national team's legacy players, and as the 116th women's player to be capped by England.

== Honours ==
Arsenal

- FA Women's Cup: 1992–93, 1994–95, 1997–98
