= Sammy Britton =

English footballer (born 1973)

Personal information
- Full name: Samantha Britton
- Date of birth: 8 December 1973 (age 52)
- Place of birth: Huddersfield, England
- Positions: Defender; midfielder; forward

Senior career*
Years	Team	Apps	(Gls)
–1992	Huddersfield Town		
1992–1993	Bronte		
1993–1996	Arsenal		
1996–1997	Cove Rangers		
1997–1998	Croydon		
1998–1999	Doncaster Belles		
1999–2000	Everton		
2000–2001	ÍBV	18	(12)
2001–2003	Leeds United		
2003–2005	Everton		
2004	ÍBV	4	(1)

International career
	England	65	(3)
- * Club domestic league appearances and goals

Samantha Britton (born 8 December 1973) is an English retired footballer, and former England international player. An extremely versatile performer, Britton was equally at home playing in defence, midfield or attack.

== Club career ==
In 1997, she was playing for Cove Rangers in Scotland, but was looking for a move back to the English Premier League. She had previously played for Arsenal.

Britton got her wish as she joined Croydon for 1997–98, featuring in the 3–2 FA Women's Cup final defeat to Arsenal. She moved to Doncaster Belles the following season. In summer 2000 Britton played for IBV in Iceland, finishing as the club's top goalscorer with 12 goals in 14 games.

In 2000, she joined ÍBV, managed by Heimir Hallgrímsson, where she netted 12 goals in 14 matches in the Icelandic top-tier league. She appeared in four matches the following season.

She returned to ÍBV in 2004, appearing in four league matches and scoring one goal. She appeared in two Cup matches and helped ÍBV defeat Valur in the Cup final.

In March 2005 she was playing for Everton, having re-joined from Leeds United in January 2003.

== International career ==
Britton played for England in the 1995 FIFA Women's World Cup. She dropped out of the side after the finals, but scored on her return two years later as England beat Scotland 4–0.

During qualifying for Euro 2001, Britton pre-empted the results of a random drugs test by admitting to smoking marijuana. She was subsequently banned for seven months by England coach Hope Powell and missed six Everton matches while attending a voluntary rehabilitation programme. Britton was recalled to the England squad for the European Championship finals.

In November 2022, Britton was recognized by The Football Association as one of the England national team's legacy players, and as the 88th women's player to be capped by England.

== Personal life ==
Britton is of Jamaican descent through her father.
