= Joanne Broadhurst =

English footballer and coach

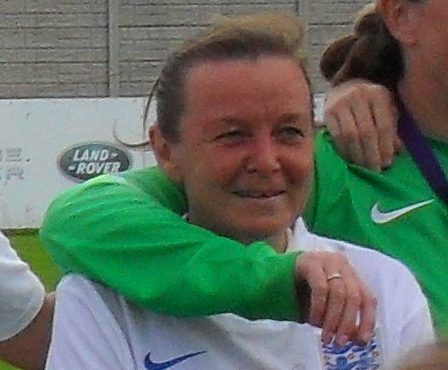

Personal information
- Date of birth: 27 November 1967 (age 58)
- Place of birth: Sheffield, England
- Height: 5 ft 4 in (1.63 m)
- Positions: Midfielder; forward

Youth career
- 1979–1987: Sheffield FC Ladies

Senior career*
Years	Team	Apps	(Gls)
1987–1995	Doncaster Belles		
1995–1997	Arsenal		
1997–2000	Croydon		
2000–2001	Doncaster Belles		
2001–2006	Charlton Athletic		
2008–2009	Rotherham United		

International career
1984–2000	England	28	(6)
- * Club domestic league appearances and goals

Joanne Broadhurst (born 27 November 1967) is an English football coach and former player. As an attacking midfielder or forward she represented England at full international level. Broadhurst also played for English clubs Doncaster Belles, Arsenal and Croydon/Charlton Athletic.

== Playing career ==
=== Club career ===
Broadhurst began playing for Sheffield FC Ladies, coached by her father Brian, at age 12. She moved to Doncaster Belles at 18 after studying Leisure and Recreation at college and spending a summer working for Pontin's. While playing for the all-conquering Belles, Broadhurst worked as a forklift truck driver for Royal Doulton in Stoke.

As a playmaker, Broadhurst was a key component of the side which wrested the League title back from Arsenal and completed a domestic double in 1994. Belles manager Paul Edmunds said of Broadhurst "the more she gets the ball, the better we play."

In 1995 Broadhurst moved to Arsenal and was given a job in the club's mail order department. In summer 1996 she underwent surgery on a knee injury, but finished the season as top goalscorer.

"I used to play hockey as well as football so the teachers used to try and make me play hockey instead. They said that I should choose to play hockey because with football I wouldn't get anywhere... they just said women had nowhere to go in football."

— Broadhurst in 1991

By 1997–98 Broadhurst was playing for Croydon, scoring the opening goal in a 3–2 defeat to Arsenal in that season's FA Women's Cup final. Croydon won a League and Cup double in 2000, clinched when they beat Aston Villa 6–0 to win the league. Broadhurst scored twice in that game. When Croydon came under the auspices of Charlton Athletic, Broadhurst returned to Doncaster Belles. However, she was back with Charlton in 2001–02.

From 2003–2005 Broadhurst featured in three successive FA Women's Cup finals with Charlton. She played in a 3–0 loss to the professionals of Fulham in May 2003, then in another defeat—again 3–0—to former club Arsenal the following year. In 2005 Broadhurst was on the winning side as Charlton beat Everton 1–0 at Upton Park. It was Broadhurst's eleventh appearance in the domestic women's game's showpiece event.

Broadhurst retired after hitting the winning goal as Charlton reserves beat Millwall Lionesses 3–2 in the 2006 Kent County Cup final.

=== International career ===
Broadhurst made her England debut aged 16. Manager Martin Reagan called–up Broadhurst for the Mundialito tournament in August 1984 and handed her a first cap against hosts Italy.

Along with Kirsty Pealling, Broadhurst was controversially dropped from the 1995 FIFA Women's World Cup squad, with manager Ted Copeland saying "They are not international footballers at this level."

Copeland had first excluded Broadhurst in August 1994 after taking exception to an interview Broadhurst and Mandy Lowe gave to The Guardian. "He only picks boring bastards, he doesn't like personality. So what can I do?" was Broadhurst's response.

Broadhurst was later recalled by Copeland and scored a hat-trick against Scotland in March 1997.

She was given number 67 when the FA announced their legacy numbers scheme to honour the 50th anniversary of England’s inaugural international.

== Coaching career ==
In 2012 Broadhurst joined Liverpool Ladies as an assistant coach.

== Personal life ==
At the Sheffield Star Football Awards in August 2021, Broadhurst received the "Pioneer of Women's Football Award" In 2023 Broadhurst was employed by the Royal Mail, but remained committed to developing women's football and worked as a scout for Southampton.
