= 1992–93 Arsenal L.F.C. season =

Arsenal Ladies football season

Arsenal Ladies
1992–93 season
- Chairman: Peter Hill-Wood
- Manager: Vic Akers
- Stadium: Hare & Hounds Ground
- National League: Winners
- FA Cup: Winners
- National League Cup: Winners
- Biggest win: 9–0 (vs Saltdean United (H), League Cup, 03 January 1993)
- Biggest defeat: 0–2 (vs Doncaster Belles (A), National League, 21 February 1993)
Home colours	Away colours

The 1992–93 season was Arsenal Ladies Football Club's 6th season since forming in 1987. The club participated in the Premier Division of the WFA National League for the first time after winning promotion the season prior.

The 1992–93 season was a historic one for the Arsenal Ladies. Firstly, they won their first National League Premier Division Title at the first attempt, losing only one game in all competitions. They set a new attendance record when they played Doncaster Belles at Highbury as part of the Michael Watson day fundraiser, with 18,196 fans watching them beat the reigning champions 2–1, thanks to goals from Gill Wylie and Naz Ball.

After winning the League, they then set their sights on the FA Cup. The final at Oxford United's Manor Ground saw them pitted against the Doncaster Belles yet again. Two quick fire goals at the end of the first half from Michelle Curley and Naz Ball allowed Arsenal to take control, and Debbie Bampton's late flourish sealed the 3–0 win, allowing them to lift the FA Cup for the first time. The treble was completed when they retained League Cup after defeating Knowsley United 3–0 at Wembley.

Arsenal's Reserve team finished second in the Greater London Regional Women's League Premier Division, but won the Greater London Regional Women's League Cup after defeating Southend 6–-0 in the Final.

Arsenal's Third team won the Greater London Regional Women's League Third Division tile, but missed out on the Russell Cup, losing 2–1 to Leyton Orient in the Final.

This was Arsenal's last season using the Hare & Hounds Ground as their main stadium. After this season, they moved to Southbury Road in Enfield.

== Squad information & statistics ==
=== First team squad ===
Name	Date of birth (age)	Since	Signed from
Goalkeepers
(England) Lesley Shipp	25 October 1964 (aged 28)	1991	(England) Millwall Lionesses
(England) Kathy Simmons	7 January 1966 (aged 27)	1991	(England) Tottenham
(England) Nancy Jeffery	18 February 1978 (aged 15)	1989	(England) Limehouse
(England) Ruth Gold	8 March 1971 (aged 22)	1991	(England) Wimbledon
Defenders
(England) Kirsty Pealling	14 April 1975 (aged 18)	1987	(England) Arsenal Academy
(England) Michelle Curley	30 April 1972 (aged 21)	1987	(England) Arsenal Academy
(Northern Ireland) Gill Wylie (c)	27 August 1965 (aged 27)	1991	(England) Tottenham
(England) Vicki Slee	9 February 1973 (aged 20)	1991	(England) Millwall Lionesses
(England) Lisa Spry	15 January 1968 (aged 25)	1989	(England) Islington
(England) Maria Luckhurst		1992	(England) Wimbledon
(England) Kelley Few	17 October 1971 (aged 21)	1991	(England) Romford
(England) Jenny Canty	22 March 1976 (aged 17)	1991	(England) Limehouse
(England) Gill Bordman	26 October 1956 (aged 36)	1987	(England) Aylesbury
(England) Paula Birri	2 May 1971 (aged 22)	1989	(England) Arsenal Academy
(England) Kellie Battams	17 January 1977 (aged 15)	1989	(England) Arsenal Academy
(England) Amy Lamont	5 May 1974 (aged 19)	1989	(England) Arsenal Academy
(Republic of Ireland) Janet Clarke	19 March 1973 (aged 20)	1991	(England) Arsenal Academy
(England) Annie Deegan	1972 (aged 21)	1988	(England) Arsenal Academy
(England) Keeley Salvage	1971 (aged 22)	1993	(England) Millwall Lionesses
(England) Carly Cruickshank		1992	(England) Limehouse
Midfielders
(England) Debbie Bampton	7 October 1961 (aged 31)	1992	(England) Wimbledon
(England) Sharon Barber	27 May 1969 (aged 24)	1988	(England) Tottenham
(England) Sian Williams	2 February 1968 (aged 25)	1990	(England) Millwall Lionesses
(England) Sarah Mulligan	22 July 1972 (aged 20)	1988	(England) Stevenage
(England) Michelle Lee	1974 (aged 19)	1988	(England) Arsenal Academy
(England) Emma Coss	9 May 1979 (aged 14)	1992	(England) Arsenal Academy
(England) Emma Hayes	18 October 1976 (aged 16)	1991	(England) Arsenal Academy
(England) Marlene Egan	7 March 1964 (aged 29)	1989	(England) Islington
(England) Lesley Palling		1991	(England) Arsenal Academy
(England) Siobhan Melia		1991	(England) District Line
(England) Andrea Wright		1989	(England) Chelmsford
Forwards
(Wales) Naz Ball	28 February 1961 (aged 32)	1987	(England) Aylesbury
(England) Jo Churchman	8 October 1963 (aged 29)	1990	(England) Millwall Lionesses
(England) Christine Couling	4 August 1967 (aged 25)	1992	(England) Ipswich Town
(England) Caroline McGloin	25 April 1960 (aged 33)	1987	(England) Aylesbury
(England) Debbie Smith		1992	(England) Southend
(England) Pat Pile	1964 (aged 29)	1989	(England) Hackney
(Scotland) Michelle Sneddon	18 January 1974 (aged 19)	1989	(Scotland) Coltness
(England) Sarah Ryan	1 July 1972 (aged 20)	1987	(England) Arsenal Academy
(England) Kelly Townshend	12 May 1977 (aged 16)	1988	(England) Arsenal Academy
(England) Alice Fairbank	2 November 1972 (aged 20)	1989	(England) Hull City
(England) Claudia Woodley		1991	(England) Arsenal Academy
(England) Clare Healey		1992	(England) Arsenal Academy
(England) Krista Yeomans		1991	(England) Arsenal Academy
Unknown
Joanne Cook	1973 (aged 20)	1993	(England) Arsenal Academy

=== Appearances and goals ===
Name	NLPD		FA Cup		NL Cup		Total	
Name	Apps	Goals	Apps	Goals	Apps	Goals	Apps	Goals
Goalkeepers
(England) Lesley Shipp	18	0	5	0	5	0	28	0
(England) Kathy Simmons	0	0	0	0	0	0	0	0
(England) Nancy Jeffery	0	0	0	0	0	0	0	0
(England) Ruth Gold	0	0	0	0	0	0	0	0
Defenders
(England) Kirsty Pealling	18	2	5	2	5	0	28	4
(England) Michelle Curley	16+1	2	4	1	4	1	24+1	4
(Northern Ireland) Gill Wylie (c)	14	5	5	1	5	1	24	7
(England) Vicki Slee	11+1	0	5	0	3+2	0	19+3	0
(England) Lisa Spry	8	0	1+1	0	2	0	11+1	0
(England) Maria Luckhurst	6+1	0	0	0	0	0	6+1	0
(England) Kelley Few	2+3	0	0+3	0	1+1	0	4+7	0
(England) Jenny Canty	0+1	0	0	0	0	0	0+1	0
(England) Gill Bordman	0	0	0	0	0	0	0	0
(England) Paula Birri	0	0	0	0	0	0	0	0
(England) Kellie Battams	0	0	0	0	0	0	0	0
(England) Amy Lamont	0	0	0	0	0	0	0	0
(Republic of Ireland) Janet Clarke	0	0	0	0	0	0	0	0
(England) Annie Deegan	0	0	0	0	0	0	0	0
(England) Keeley Salvage	0	0	0	0	0	0	0	0
(England) Carly Cruickshank	0	0	0	0	0	0	0	0
Midfielders
(England) Debbie Bampton	18	11	5	4	5	5	28	20
(England) Sharon Barber	18	0	5	0	5	0	28	0
(England) Sian Williams	17	1	5	0	5	1	27	2
(England) Sarah Mulligan	2+6	0	0+1	0	0	0	2+7	0
(England) Michelle Lee	0+1	0	0	0	0	0	0+1	0
(England) Emma Coss	0	0	0	0	0	0	0	0
(England) Emma Hayes	0	0	0	0	0	0	0	0
(England) Marlene Egan	0	0	0	0	0	0	0	0
(England) Lesley Palling	0	0	0	0	0	0	0	0
(England) Siobhan Melia	0	0	0	0	0	0	0	0
Forwards
(Wales) Naz Ball	17+1	28	5	7	5	7	27+1	42
(England) Jo Churchman	18	12	5	3	5	6	27	21
(England) Christine Couling	10+2	2	4	0	4	8	18+2	10
(England) Caroline McGloin	4	1	1	1	0+1	0	5+1	2
(England) Debbie Smith	0+5	1	0+3	0	1	0	1+8	1
(England) Pat Pile	1+1	1	0	0	0	0	1+1	1
(Scotland) Michelle Sneddon	0+4	0	0+1	0	0+1	0	0+6	0
(England) Sarah Ryan	0	0	0	0	0	0	0	0
(England) Kelly Townshend	0	0	0	0	0	0	0	0
(England) Alice Fairbank	0	0	0	0	0	0	0	0
(England) Andrea Wright	0	0	0	0	0	0	0	0
(England) Claudia Woodley	0	0	0	0	0	0	0	0
(England) Clare Healey	0	0	0	0	0	0	0	0
(England) Krista Yeomans	0	0	0	0	0	0	0	0
Unknown
Joanne Cook	0	0	0	0	0	0	0	0

=== Goalscorers ===
Rank	Position	Name	NLPD	FA Cup	NL Cup	Total
1	FW	(Wales) Naz Ball	28	7	7	42
2	FW	(England) Jo Churchman	12	3	6	21
3	MF	(England) Debbie Bampton	11	4	5	20
4	MF	(England) Christine Couling	2	0	8	10
5	DF	(Northern Ireland) Gill Wylie (c)	5	1	1	7
6	DF	(England) Michelle Curley	2	1	1	4
6	DF	(England) Kirsty Pealling	2	2	0	4
8	FW	(England) Caroline McGloin	1	1	0	2
8	MF	(England) Sian Williams	1	0	1	2
10	FW	(England) Pat Pile	1	0	0	1
10	FW	(England) Debbie Smith	1	0	0	1
Total			66	19	29	114

=== Clean sheets ===
Rank	Name	NLPD	FA Cup	NL Cup	Total
1	(England) Lesley Shipp	12	2	3	17
2	(England) Ruth Gold	0	0	0	0
2	(England) Kathy Simmons	0	0	0	0
2	(England) Nancy Jeffery	0	0	0	0
Total		12	2	3	17

== Transfers, loans and other signings ==
=== Transfers in ===
Announcement date	Position	Player	From club
1992	MF	(England) Debbie Bampton	(England) Wimbledon
1992	FW	(England) Christine Couling	(England) Ipswich Town
1992	DF	(England) Maria Luckhurst	(England) Wimbledon
1992	FW	(England) Debbie Smith	(England) Southend
1992	DF	(England) Carly Cruickshank	(England) Limehouse
1993	DF	(England) Keeley Salvage	(England) Millwall Lionesses

=== Transfers out ===
Announcement date	Position	Player	To club
1992	DF	(England) Columbine Saunders	(England) Bromley Borough
1992	MF	(Iceland) Arndis Olafsdottir	
1992	FW	(England) Janette Smith	
1992	DF	Becky Hayes	
1992	GK	Anna Dignan	
1992	DF	Leona Dewer	
1992	DF	Thea Sharrock	
1992	FW	Zoella White	

== Club ==
=== Kit ===
Supplier: Adidas / Sponsor: JVC

Home	Away

== Non-competitive ==
=== Reebok Cup ===
==== Group phase ====
8 August 1992 1	Arsenal	2–0	Sharley Park
	Melia; Smith	Report

8 August 1992 2	Arsenal	8–0	Hackney
	Smith; Ball; Barber; Few	Report

8 August 1992 3	Arsenal	3–0	St Helens
	Ball; Britton	Report

==== Knockout phase ====
9 August 1992 Quarter-finals	Arsenal	1–0	Rainworth
	Melia	Report

9 August 1992 Semi-finals	Arsenal	2–1	Knowsley United
	Churchman; McGloin	Report	Goal

9 August 1992 Final	Arsenal	3–0	Doncaster Belles
	Ball; Mulligan	Report

=== Pre-season ===
23 August 1992	Arsenal	9–0	Dundee United
	Ball; Sneddon; Mulligan; Curley	Report

Arsenal	3–0	Broadbridge Heath
Williams; Luckhurst; Churchman

6 September 1992	Arsenal	6–0	Hassocks Beacon	Bromley
	Churchman; McGloin; Ball	Report		Stadium: Hayes Lane

Arsenal	5–0	Dunstable
Sneddon; Mulligan; Lee; Melia

== Competitions ==
=== Overall record ===
Competition	First match	Last match	Starting round	Final position	Record							
Competition	First match	Last match	Starting round	Final position	Pld	W	D	L	GF	GA	GD	Win %
WFA National League National Division	13 September 1992	9 May 1993	Matchday 1	Winners	18	17	0	1	66	8	+58	94.44
WFA Cup	6 December 1992	24 April 1993	Fourth round	Winners	5	5	0	0	19	3	+16	100.00
WFA National League Cup	20 December 1992	29 May 1993	First round	Winners	5	5	0	0	29	3	+26	100.00
Total					28	27	0	1	114	14	+100	96.43

Last updated: 22 May 2026
Source: WFA NL

=== WFA National League Premier Division ===
==== Partial league table ====
Pos	Team	Pld	W	D	L	GF	GA	GD	Pts
1	Arsenal (C)	18	17	0	1	66	8	+58	34
2	Doncaster Belles	18	16	0	2	80	10	+70	32
3	Knowsley United	18	11	1	6	37	33	+4	23
4	Wimbledon	18	9	3	6	36	37	−1	21
5	Red Star Southampton	18	7	3	8	37	41	−4	17

Source: WFA NL
(C) Champions

==== Results by matchday ====
Matchday	1	2	3	4	5	6	7	8	9	10	11	12	13	14	15	16	17	18
Ground	H	H	H	A	A	H	H	A	A	H	H	A	A	A	H	A	H	A
Result	W	W	W	W	W	W	W	W	W	W	W	W	L	W	W	W	W	W
Position	1	1	1	1	1	1	1	1	1	1	1	1	1	1	1	1	1	1

Source: WFA NL
W = Win; D = Draw; L = Loss

==== Matches ====
13 September 1992 1	Arsenal	2–0	Millwall Lionesses	Leyton
14:00 BST	Ball 30', 82'	Report		Stadium: Hare & Hounds Ground; Referee: C. Manley (Essex)

20 September 1992 2	Arsenal	7–0	Ipswich Town	Leyton
12:00 BST	McGloin 17'; Ball 29', 61', 74'; Williams 38'; Bampton 48', 82'	Report		Stadium: Hare & Hounds Ground; Referee: D. Buckeridge

27 September 1992 3	Arsenal	5–0	Knowsley United	Leyton
	Ball 30', 61', 75'; Churchman 77', 80'	Report		Stadium: Hare & Hounds Ground

4 October 1992 4	Bronte	0–2	Arsenal	Shipley
14:00 BST		Report	Bampton	Stadium: Shipley Providence Cricket Club; Referee: Mr I Marsh

11 October 1992 5	Maidstone Tigresses	0–3	Arsenal
		Report	Pile; Ball; Churchman

25 October 1992 6	Arsenal	9–2	Wimbledon	Leyton
12:00 BST	Ball; Churchman; Wylie; Bampton	Report	Goal	Stadium: Hare & Hounds Ground; Referee: Mr K. Coniam

8 November 1992 7	Arsenal	2–0	Stanton Rangers	Leyton
14:00 BST	Ball; Bampton 85'	Report		Stadium: Hare & Hounds Ground

13 December 1992 8	Ipswich Town	0–5	Arsenal
		Report	Wylie; Churchman 75'; Ball; Curley

10 January 1993 9	Knowsley United	0–2	Arsenal
		Report	Couling; Churchman

17 January 1993 10	Arsenal	3–0	Bronte	Leyton
12:00 GMT	Ball 48', 73'; Bampton 79'	Report		Stadium: Hare & Hounds Ground; Referee: H. Cartz (Middlesex)

31 January 1993 11	Arsenal	7–0	Maidstone Tigresses	Leyton
12:00 GMT	Ball; Churchman; Pealling; Curley; Smith	Report		Stadium: Hare & Hounds Ground; Referee: I. Clarke

14 February 1993 12	Wimbledon	0–4	Arsenal	Wimbledon
14:00 GMT		Report	Couling; Wylie 75'; Ball	Stadium: Plough Lane

21 February 1993 13	Doncaster Belles	2–0	Arsenal	Armthorpe
14:00 GMT	Coulthard 54'; Walker 90'	Report		Stadium: Welfare Ground; Referee: M. Cairnes

28 February 1993 14	Stanton Rangers	1–2	Arsenal
	Rose 86'	Report	Wylie; Ball 81'

14 March 1993 15	Arsenal	4–1	Red Star Southampton	Leyton
	Bampton; Churchman; Ball	Report	Goal	Stadium: Hare & Hounds Ground

21 March 1993 16	Millwall Lionesses	0–3	Arsenal	Dulwich
13:00 GMT		Report	Pealling; Bampton; Churchman (pen.)	Stadium: Surrey Docks Stadium; Referee: Mick Burrell

28 March 1993 17	Arsenal	2–1	Doncaster Belles	Highbury
	Wylie 5'; Ball 58'	Report	Coulthard 45'	Stadium: Highbury; Attendance: 18,196; Referee: Bill Saville

9 May 1993 18	Red Star Southampton	1–4	Arsenal	Fareham
	Goal	Report	Bampton; Ball; Churchman	Stadium: Cam Alders Stadium

=== WFA Cup ===
6 December 1992 Fourth round	Brighton & Hove Albion	1–5	Arsenal	Withdean
	Goal	Report	Ball; Churchman; McGloin; Pealling	Stadium: Withdean Stadium

7 February 1993 Fifth round	Arsenal	4–1	District Line	Leyton
12:00 GMT	Bampton 18'; Ball 42'; Churchman 47'; Wylie 74'	Report	Jones 71'	Stadium: Hare & Hounds Ground; Referee: G Pope (London)

7 March 1993 Quarter-finals	Arsenal	5–1	Red Star Southampton	Leyton
14:00 GMT	Bampton; Pealling; Ball; Churchman	Report	Goal	Stadium: Hare & Hounds Ground; Referee: D. Martin (Nottinghamshire)

3 April 1993 Semi-finals	Arsenal	2–0	Bromley Borough	Cambridge
11:00 BST	Bampton 52'; Ball 62'	Report		Stadium: City Ground; Attendance: 320; Referee: J. Smith (Middlesex)

24 April 1993 Final	Arsenal	3–0	Doncaster Belles	Oxford
14:30 BST	Curley 45'; Ball 45+8'; Bampton 80'	Report		Stadium: Manor Ground; Attendance: 3,547; Referee: Mike Cairns (Coventry)

=== WFA National League Cup ===
20 December 1992 First round	Arsenal	8–0	Hassocks	Leyton
	Couling; Churchman; Bampton; Ball	Report		Stadium: Hare & Hounds Ground

3 January 1993 Second round	Arsenal	9–0	Saltdean United	Leyton
14:00 GMT	Ball; Couling; Churchman; Wylie; Bampton	Report		Stadium: Hare & Hounds Ground; Referee: T Peters (Hertfordshire)

24 January 1993 Quarter-finals	District Line	1–5	Arsenal	Osterley
	Grant 12'	Report	Ball 11'; Bampton 17'; Curley; Couling	Stadium: LT District Line Sports Ground

18 April 1993 Semi-finals	Wimbledon	2–4	Arsenal
	Benham 9', 75'	Report	Williams; Churchman; Ball; Bampton 87'

29 May 1993 Final	Arsenal	3–0	Knowsley United	Wembley
12:15 BST	Ball 47'; Couling 61'	Report		Stadium: Wembley Stadium; Referee: Tony Blair (Manchester)

== Arsenal reserves ==
=== Greater London Regional Women’s League Premier Division ===
==== League table ====
Pos	Team	Pld	W	D	L	GF	GA	GD	Pts
1	Leyton Orient (C)	18	15	2	1	71	18	+53	32
2	Arsenal Reserves	18	14	2	2	72	25	+47	30
3	Watford	18	10	4	4	43	25	+18	24
4	Brentford	18	11	1	6	52	38	+14	23
5	Tottenham Hotspur	18	6	4	8	43	44	−1	16
6	Tottenham	18	7	0	11	40	48	−8	14
7	Wimbledon Reserves	18	5	4	9	27	38	−11	14
8	Millwall Lionesses Reserves	18	5	3	10	26	47	−21	13
9	Romford	18	2	6	10	23	46	−23	10
10	Hillingdon	18	0	4	14	7	75	−68	4

Source: GLPD
(C) Champions

27 September 1992	Arsenal Reserves	2–2	Romford	Walthamstow
	Pile; Melia	Report	Goal	Stadium: Douglas Eyre Sports Centre

11 October 1992	Arsenal Reserves	3–2	Tottenham	Walthamstow
	McGloin	Report	Goal	Stadium: Douglas Eyre Sports Centre

18 October 1992	Tottenham	1–4	Arsenal Reserves
	Goal		Lamont; Lee; Sneddon; Mulligan

25 October 1992	Arsenal Reserves	6–0	Watford	Walthamstow
	McGloin; Smith; Sneddon; Few; (o.g.)	Report		Stadium: Douglas Eyre Sports Centre

8 November 1993	Arsenal Reserves	3–1	Brentford	Brentford
	Mulligan; McGloin; Couling		Goal	Stadium: Douglas Eyre Sports Centre

15 November 1992	Tottenham Hotspur	3–4	Arsenal Reserves
	Goal	Report	Slee; Healey; Couling; Lee

13 December 1992	Leyton Orient	2–2	Arsenal Reserves
	Goal		Mulligan; Smith

3 January 1993	Arsenal Reserves	5–1	Wimbledon Reserves	Walthamstow
	Lee; Mulligan; McGloin; Egan; Woodley	Report	Goal	Stadium: Douglas Eyre Sports Centre

10 January 1993	Wimbledon Reserves	5–1	Arsenal Reserves
	Goal		Pile

24 January 1993	Watford	0–1	Arsenal Reserves
		Report	Sneddon

7 February 1993	Brentford	1–6	Arsenal Reserves
	Goal	Report	Sneddon; McGloin

14 February 1993	Arsenal Reserves	5–1	Hillingdon
	McGloin; Lamont	Report	Goal

14 February 1993	Hillingdon	0–9	Arsenal Reserves
		Report	McGloin; Salvage; Smith

28 February 1993	Arsenal Reserves	3–0	Tottenham Hotspur	Walthamstow
	Sneddon; Cook; Mulligan	Report		Stadium: Douglas Eyre Sports Centre

14 March 1993	Millwall Lionesses Reserves	?–?	Arsenal Reserves

14 March 1993	Arsenal Reserves	?–?	Millwall Lionesses Reserves	Walthamstow
				Stadium: Douglas Eyre Sports Centre

18 April 1993	Romford	3–7	Arsenal Reserves
	Goal	Report	Lee; Cook; McGloin; Pile; Salvage

Arsenal Reserves	?–?	Leyton Orient	Walthamstow
			Stadium: Douglas Eyre Sports Centre

=== Greater London League Cup ===
Final	Arsenal Reserves	6–0	Southend
	Pile; McGloin; Mulligan (pen.); Woodley; Cook	Report

== Arsenal thirds ==
=== Greater London Regional Women’s League Division Three ===
Pos	Team	Pld	W	D	L	GF	GA	GD	Pts
1	Arsenal Thirds (C)	18	16	1	1	78	26	+52	33
2	Pinewood	18	11	2	5	65	47	+18	24
3	Palace Eagles	18	11	1	6	51	42	+9	23
4	Chelmsford	18	10	1	7	34	34	0	21
5	Walton Hersham	18	8	4	6	41	32	+9	20
6	Chislehurst	17	6	4	7	18	25	−7	16
7	Leyton Orient Reserves	18	6	4	8	43	39	+4	16
8	Wimbledon Thirds	18	4	4	10	24	45	−21	12
9	Hampstead Heath	18	3	2	13	32	64	−32	8
10	Tottenham Reserves	18	1	4	13	27	59	−32	6

Source: GLDT
(C) Champions

27 September 1992	Pinewood	1–7	Arsenal Thirds
	Goal	Report	Coss; Woodley; Canty; Townshend; Palling

4 October 1992	Chislehurst	0–3	Arsenal Thirds
			Townshend; Wright

11 October 1992	Arsenal Thirds	8–3	Wimbledon Thirds	Tufnell Park
	Addison; Townshend; Wright; Woodley; Palling	Report	Goal	Stadium: Tufnell Park Playing Fields

25 October 1992	Wimbledon Thirds	2–3	Arsenal Thirds
	Goal	Report	Cook; Addison

1 November 1992	Arsenal Thirds	4–2	Tottenham Reserves	Tufnell Park
	Coss; Townshend; Addison; Dewer		Goal	Stadium: Tufnell Park Playing Fields

15 November 1992	Arsenal Thirds	4–1	Leyton Orient Reserves	Tufnell Park
	Dewer; Wright; Addison	Report	Goal	Stadium: Tufnell Park Playing Fields

20 December 1992	Tottenham Reserves	1–7	Arsenal Thirds
	Goal		Cook; Townshend; Wright

10 January 1993	Arsenal Thirds	7–2	Chelmsford	Tufnell Park
	Cook; Coss; Dewer; Townshend		Goal	Stadium: Tufnell Park Playing Fields

31 January 1993	Palace Eagles	3–8	Arsenal Thirds
	Goal	Report	Cook; Addison; Townshend; Palling; Freeman; Allen

7 February 1993	Arsenal Thirds	2–1	Palace Eagles	Tufnell Park
	Townshend	Report	Goal	Stadium: Tufnell Park Playing Fields

14 February 1993	Walton & Hersham	1–4	Arsenal Thirds
	Goal	Report	Cook; Townshend

14 February 1993	Arsenal Thirds	2–2	Walton & Hersham
	Cook; Townshend	Report	Goal

21 February 1993	Hampstead	0–1	Arsenal Thirds
			Allen

21 February 1993	Arsenal Thirds	7–0	Hampstead	Tufnell Park
	Addison; Allen; Cook; Dewer; Wright			Stadium: Tufnell Park Playing Fields

28 February 1993	Arsenal Thirds	5–3	Pinewood	Tufnell Park
	Wright; Dewer; Coss; Townshend	Report	Goal	Stadium: Tufnell Park Playing Fields

28 March 1993	Arsenal Thirds	?–?	Chislehurst	Tufnell Park
				Stadium: Tufnell Park Playing Fields

4 April 1993	Chelmsford	?–?	Arsenal Thirds

18 April 1993	Leyton Orient Reserves	?–?	Arsenal Thirds

=== Russell Cup ===
7 March 1993 Semi Final	Arsenal Thirds	?–?	Wimbledon Reserves

Final	Arsenal Thirds	1–2	Leyton Orient
	Dewar	Report	Goal

== See also ==
- List of Arsenal W.F.C. seasons
- 1992–93 in English football
