= 1991–92 Arsenal L.F.C. season =

English women's football club season

Arsenal Ladies
1991–92 season
- Chairman: Peter Hill-Wood
- Manager: Vic Akers
- Stadium: Hare & Hounds Ground
- Division One South: Winners
- FA Cup: Fourth Round
- National League Cup: Winners
- Biggest win: 17–0 (vs Milton Keynes (H), National League, 12 April 1992)
- Biggest defeat: 0–1 (vs Red Star Southampton (H), FA Cup, 01 December 1991)
| Home colours | Away colours |

The 1991–92 season was Arsenal Ladies Football Club's 5th season since forming in 1987. The club participated in the Southern Division of the WFA National League, winning the league with an unbeaten campaign and gaining promotion to the Premier Division. They also won the first edition of the League Cup, their first ever major title, after defeating Millwall Lionesses in the Final. However, they were knocked out of the FA Cup by Red Star Southampton.

== Squad information & statistics ==
=== First team squad ===
| Name | Date of birth (age) | Since | Signed from |
Goalkeepers
| (England) Lesley Shipp | 25 October 1965 (aged 26) | 1991 | (England) Millwall Lionesses |
| (England) Kathy Simmons | 7 January 1966 (aged 26) | 1991 | (England) Tottenham |
| (England) Nancy Jeffery | 18 February 1978 (aged 14) | 1989 | (England) Limehouse |
| (England) Ruth Gold | 8 March 1971 (aged 21) | 1991 | (England) Wimbledon |
| Anna Dignan | | 1991 | (England) Arsenal Academy |
Defenders
| (England) Kirsty Pealling | 14 April 1975 (aged 17) | 1987 | (England) Arsenal Academy |
| (England) Kelley Few | 17 October 1971 (aged 20) | 1991 | (England) Romford |
| (England) Michelle Curley | 30 April 1972 (aged 20) | 1987 | (England) Arsenal Academy |
| (Northern Ireland) Gill Wylie | 27 August 1965 (aged 26) | 1991 | (England) Tottenham |
| (England) Vicki Slee | 9 March 1973 (aged 19) | 1991 | (England) Millwall Lionesses |
| (England) Lisa Spry | 15 January 1968 (aged 24) | 1989 | (England) Islington |
| (England) Columbine Saunders | 9 November 1969 (aged 22) | 1989 | (England) Islington |
| (England) Gill Bordman | 26 October 1956 (aged 35) | 1987 | (England) Aylesbury |
| (England) Paula Birri | 2 May 1971 (aged 22) | 1989 | (England) Arsenal Academy |
| (England) Kellie Battams | 17 January 1977 (aged 15) | 1989 | (England) Arsenal Academy |
| (England) Jenny Canty | 22 March 1976 (aged 16) | 1991 | (England) Limehouse |
| (Republic of Ireland) Janet Clarke | 19 March 1973 (aged 19) | 1989 | (England) Arsenal Academy |
| (England) Annie Deegan | 1972 (aged 20) | 1988 | (England) Arsenal Academy |
| Leona Dewer | | 1991 | (England) Arsenal Academy |
| Becky Hayes | | 1991 | (England) Arsenal Academy |
| Thea Sharrock | | 1991 | (England) Arsenal Academy |
Midfielders
| (England) Sharon Barber | 27 May 1969 (aged 23) | 1988 | (England) Tottenham |
| (England) Sian Williams | 2 February 1968 (aged 24) | 1990 | (England) Millwall Lionesses |
| (England) Sarah Mulligan | 22 July 1972 (aged 19) | 1988 | (England) Stevenage |
| (England) Michelle Lee | 1974 (aged 18) | 1988 | (England) Arsenal Academy |
| (England) Emma Hayes | 18 October 1976 (aged 15) | 1991 | (England) Arsenal Academy |
| (England) Marlene Egan | 7 March 1964 (aged 28) | 1989 | (England) Islington |
| (England) Amy Lamont | 5 May 1974 (aged 18) | 1989 | (England) Arsenal Academy |
| (Iceland) Arndis Olafsdottir | | 1991 | |
| (England) Lesley Palling | | 1991 | (England) Arsenal Academy |
| (England) Siobhan Melia | | 1991 | (England) District Line |
| (England) Andrea Wright | | 1989 | (England) Chelmsford |
Forwards
| (Wales) Naz Ball | 28 February 1961 (aged 31) | 1987 | (England) Aylesbury |
| (England) Jo Churchman | 8 October 1963 (aged 28) | 1990 | (England) Millwall Lionesses |
| (England) Caroline McGloin (c) | 25 April 1960 (aged 32) | 1987 | (England) Aylesbury |
| (England) Pat Pile | 1964 (aged 28) | 1989 | (England) Hackney |
| (Scotland) Michelle Sneddon | 18 January 1974 (aged 18) | 1989 | (Scotland) Coltness |
| (England) Kelly Townshend | 12 May 1977 (aged 15) | 1988 | (England) Arsenal Academy |
| (England) Sarah Ryan | 1 July 1972 (aged 19) | 1987 | (England) Arsenal Academy |
| (England) Alice Fairbank | 2 November 1972 (aged 19) | 1989 | (England) Hull City |
| (England) Janette Smith | | 1987 | (England) Arsenal Academy |
| (England) Claudia Woodley | | 1991 | (England) Arsenal Academy |
| (England) Krista Yeomans | | 1991 | (England) Arsenal Academy |
| (Algeria) Nora Bethi | | 1991 | (England) Arsenal Academy |
| Zoella White | | 1991 | (England) Arsenal Academy |
Unknown
| Joanne Cook | 1973 (aged 19) | 1991 | (England) Arsenal Academy |

=== Appearances and goals ===
| Name | NLPD | | FA Cup | | NL Cup | | Total | |
| Name | Apps | Goals | Apps | Goals | Apps | Goals | Apps | Goals |
Goalkeepers
| (England) Lesley Shipp | 17 | 0 | 1 | 0 | 4 | 0 | 22 | 0 |
| (England) Kathy Simmons | 0 | 0 | 0 | 0 | 0 | 0 | 0 | 0 |
| (England) Nancy Jeffery | 0 | 0 | 0 | 0 | 0 | 0 | 0 | 0 |
| (England) Ruth Gold | 0 | 0 | 0 | 0 | 0 | 0 | 0 | 0 |
| Anna Dignan | 0 | 0 | 0 | 0 | 0 | 0 | 0 | 0 |
Defenders
| (England) Kirsty Pealling | 17 | 1 | 1 | 0 | 4 | 0 | 22 | 1 |
| (England) Kelley Few | 16+1 | 2 | 1 | 0 | 4 | 0 | 21+1 | 2 |
| (England) Michelle Curley | 16 | 4 | 1 | 0 | 4 | 2 | 21 | 6 |
| (Northern Ireland) Gill Wylie | 15 | 7 | 1 | 0 | 4 | 0 | 20 | 7 |
| (England) Vicki Slee | 11+1 | 0 | 0 | 0 | 3 | 0 | 14+1 | 0 |
| (England) Lisa Spry | 9+3 | 0 | 1 | 0 | 2 | 0 | 12+3 | 0 |
| (England) Columbine Saunders | 2+1 | 0 | 0 | 0 | 0 | 0 | 2+1 | 0 |
| (England) Gill Bordman | 0 | 0 | 0 | 0 | 0 | 0 | 0 | 0 |
| (England) Paula Birri | 0 | 0 | 0 | 0 | 0 | 0 | 0 | 0 |
| (England) Kellie Battams | 0 | 0 | 0 | 0 | 0 | 0 | 0 | 0 |
| (England) Jenny Canty | 0 | 0 | 0 | 0 | 0 | 0 | 0 | 0 |
| (Republic of Ireland) Janet Clarke | 3 | 0 | 0 | 0 | 0 | 0 | 3 | 0 |
| (England) Annie Deegan | 0 | 0 | 0 | 0 | 0 | 0 | 0 | 0 |
| Leona Dewer | 0 | 0 | 0 | 0 | 0 | 0 | 0 | 0 |
| Becky Hayes | 0 | 0 | 0 | 0 | 0 | 0 | 0 | 0 |
Midfielders
| (England) Sharon Barber | 16 | 2 | 1 | 0 | 4 | 1 | 21 | 3 |
| (England) Sian Williams | 15 | 0 | 1 | 0 | 4 | 0 | 20 | 0 |
| (Iceland) Arndis Olafsdottir | 8+1 | 1 | 0+1 | 0 | 1 | 1 | 9+2 | 2 |
| (England) Sarah Mulligan | 2+4 | 4 | 0 | 0 | 0 | 0 | 2+4 | 4 |
| (England) Michelle Lee | 1+2 | 1 | 0 | 0 | 0 | 0 | 1+2 | 1 |
| (England) Marlene Egan | 0 | 0 | 0 | 0 | 0 | 0 | 0 | 0 |
| (England) Amy Lamont | 0 | 0 | 0 | 0 | 0 | 0 | 0 | 0 |
| (England) Lesley Palling | 0 | 0 | 0 | 0 | 0 | 0 | 0 | 0 |
| (England) Siobhan Melia | 0 | 0 | 0 | 0 | 0 | 0 | 0 | 0 |
Forwards
| (Wales) Naz Ball | 16 | 23 | 1 | 0 | 4 | 4 | 21 | 27 |
| (England) Jo Churchman | 16 | 27 | 1 | 0 | 4 | 2 | 21 | 29 |
| (England) Caroline McGloin (c) | 16 | 24 | 1 | 0 | 4 | 6 | 21 | 30 |
| (England) Pat Pile | 2 | 0 | 0+1 | 0 | 0 | 0 | 2+1 | 0 |
| (Scotland) Michelle Sneddon | 0+2 | 1 | 0 | 0 | 0 | 0 | 0+2 | 1 |
| (England) Kelly Townshend | 0 | 0 | 0 | 0 | 0 | 0 | 0 | 0 |
| (England) Alice Fairbank | 0 | 0 | 0 | 0 | 0 | 0 | 0 | 0 |
| (England) Janette Smith | 0 | 0 | 0 | 0 | 0 | 0 | 0 | 0 |
| (England) Andrea Wright | 0 | 0 | 0 | 0 | 0 | 0 | 0 | 0 |
| (England) Claudia Woodley | 0 | 0 | 0 | 0 | 0 | 0 | 0 | 0 |
| (England) Krista Yeomans | 0 | 0 | 0 | 0 | 0 | 0 | 0 | 0 |
| Zoella White | 0 | 0 | 0 | 0 | 0 | 0 | 0 | 0 |
Unknown
| Joanne Cook | 0 | 0 | 0 | 0 | 0 | 0 | 0 | 0 |
| Nora Bethi | 0 | 0 | 0 | 0 | 0 | 0 | 0 | 0 |

=== Goalscorers ===
| Rank | Position | Name | NLDOS | FA Cup | NL Cup | Total |
|---|---|---|---|---|---|---|
| 1 | FW | (England) Caroline McGloin | 24 | 0 | 6 | 30 |
| 2 | FW | (England) Jo Churchman | 27 | 0 | 2 | 29 |
| 3 | FW | (Wales) Naz Ball | 23 | 0 | 4 | 27 |
| 4 | DF | (Northern Ireland) Gill Wylie | 7 | 0 | 0 | 7 |
| 5 | DF | (England) Michelle Curley | 4 | 0 | 2 | 6 |
| 6 | MF | (England) Sarah Mulligan | 4 | 0 | 0 | 4 |
| 7 | MF | (England) Sharon Barber | 2 | 0 | 1 | 3 |
| 8 | DF | (England) Kelley Few | 2 | 0 | 0 | 2 |
| 8 | MF | (Iceland) Arndis Olafsdottir | 1 | 0 | 1 | 2 |
| 10 | FW | (England) Michelle Lee | 1 | 0 | 0 | 1 |
| 10 | DF | (England) Kirsty Pealling | 1 | 0 | 0 | 1 |
| 10 | FW | (Scotland) Michelle Sneddon | 1 | 0 | 0 | 1 |
| Own goal | | | 2 | 0 | 1 | 3 |
| Total | | | 99 | 0 | 17 | 116 |

=== Clean sheets ===
| Rank | Name | NLDOS | FA Cup | NL Cup | Total |
|---|---|---|---|---|---|
| 1 | (England) Lesley Shipp | 6 | 0 | 3 | 9 |
| 2 | (England) Kathy Simmons | 0 | 0 | 0 | 0 |
| 2 | (England) Nancy Jeffery | 0 | 0 | 0 | 0 |
| Total | | 6 | 0 | 3 | 9 |

== Transfers, loans and other signings ==
=== Transfers in ===
| Announcement date | Position | Player | From club |
|---|---|---|---|
| 1991 | GK | (England) Lesley Shipp | (England) Millwall Lionesses |
| 1991 | DF | (Northern Ireland) Gill Wylie | (England) Tottenham |
| 1991 | DF | (England) Kelley Few | (England) Romford |
| 1991 | DF | (England) Vicki Slee | (England) Millwall Lionesses |
| 1991 | DF | (England) Jenny Canty | (England) Limehouse |
| 1991 | GK | (England) Kathy Simmons | (England) Tottenham |
| 1991 | GK | (England) Ruth Gold | (England) Wimbledon |
| 1991 | MF | (England) Siobhan Melia | (England) District Line |
| 1991 | MF | (Iceland) Arndis Olafsdottir | |

=== Transfers out ===
| Announcement date | Position | Player | To club |
|---|---|---|---|
| 1991 | GK | (England) Pauline Cope | (England) Millwall Lionesses |
| 1991 | DF | (England) Alicia O'Grady | Retired |
| 1991 | FW | (England) Deb Ingram | (England) Red Star Southampton |
| 1991 | DF | (England) Angela Coneron | |
| 1991 | MF | (Scotland) Jennifer Strange | |

== Club ==
=== Kit ===
Supplier: Adidas / Sponsor: JVC

| Home | Away |

== Competitions ==
=== Overall record ===
| Competition | First match | Last match | Starting round | Final position | Record | | | | | | | |
| Competition | First match | Last match | Starting round | Final position | Pld | W | D | L | GF | GA | GD | Win % |
|---|---|---|---|---|---|---|---|---|---|---|---|---|
| WFA National League Southern Division | 15 September 1991 | 26 April 1992 | Matchday 1 | Winners | 14 | 11 | 3 | 0 | 99 | 11 | +88 | 78.57 |
| WFA Cup | 1 December 1991 | | Fourth round | Fourth round | 1 | 0 | 0 | 1 | 0 | 1 | −1 | 0.00 |
| WFA National League Cup | 8 March 1992 | 24 May 1992 | First round | Winners | 4 | 4 | 0 | 0 | 17 | 2 | +15 | 100.00 |
| Total | | | | | 19 | 15 | 3 | 1 | 116 | 14 | +102 | 78.95 |

Last updated: 22 May 2026
Source: WFA NL

=== WFA National League Division One South ===
==== Partial league table ====
| Pos | Team | Pld | W | D | L | GF | GA | GD | Pts | Promotion or relegation |
|---|---|---|---|---|---|---|---|---|---|---|
| 1 | Arsenal (C, P) | 14 | 11 | 3 | 0 | 99 | 11 | +88 | 25 | Promotion to the Premier Division |
| 2 | Abbeydale Alvechurch | 14 | 11 | 2 | 1 | 58 | 7 | +51 | 24 | Moved to Division One North |
| 3 | Hassocks Beacon | 14 | 7 | 4 | 3 | 57 | 32 | +25 | 18 | |
| 4 | Town & County | 14 | 7 | 2 | 5 | 52 | 35 | +17 | 16 | |
| 5 | Reigate | 14 | 4 | 3 | 7 | 31 | 34 | −3 | 11 | |

Source: WFA NL
(C) Champions; (P) Promoted

==== Results by matchday ====
| Matchday | 1 | 2 | 3 | 4 | 5 | 6 | 7 | 8 | 9 | 10 | 11 | 12 | 13 | 14 |
|---|---|---|---|---|---|---|---|---|---|---|---|---|---|---|
| Ground | H | A | H | A | A | H | A | H | H | A | A | H | H | A |
| Result | W | D | W | D | W | W | W | W | W | W | W | W | W | D |
| Position | 1 | 2 | 1 | 1 | 1 | 1 | 1 | 1 | 1 | 1 | 1 | 1 | 1 | 1 |

Source: WFA NL
W = Win; D = Draw; L = Loss

==== Matches ====
| 15 September 1991 1 | Arsenal | 15–1 | Broadbridge Heath | Leyton |
| | Curley 1'; McGloin 2', 8', 39', 62', 72'; Churchman 18', 42', 44', 56', 58', 90'; Mulligan 65'; Stockwell 69' (o.g.); Barber 71' | Report | Chenery 80' | Stadium: Hare & Hounds Ground |

| 29 September 1991 2 | Hassocks Beacon | 1–1 | Arsenal | Haywards Heath |
| | Pratt 49' | Report | Mulligan 82' (pen.) | Stadium: Hanbury Park; Attendance: 100; Referee: Mr B Savill (Stoneleigh) |

| 13 October 1991 3 | Arsenal | 5–0 | Town & County | Leyton |
| | Ball 15'; Wylie 44'; McGloin 52'; Churchman 70'; Lee 87' | Report | | Stadium: Hare & Hounds Ground |

| 20 October 1991 4 | Abbeydale Alvechurch | 1–1 | Arsenal | Alvechurch |
| | Cresswell 55' | Report | Churchman 86' (pen.) | Stadium: Lye Meadow |

| 10 November 1991 5 | Brighton & Hove Albion | 0–7 | Arsenal | Withdean |
| 14:00 GMT | | Report | Ball; McGloin | Stadium: Withdean Stadium |

| 24 November 1991 6 | Arsenal | 7–1 | Reigate | Leyton |
| 14:00 GMT | Ball 15'; Few 34'; Churchman 64', 68', 70'; McGloin 80', 86' | Report | Knowles 49' | Stadium: Hare & Hounds Ground |

| 8 December 1991 7 | Broadbridge Heath | 0–8 | Arsenal |
| | | Report | Churchman 25', 37', 72' (pen.), 85'; Curley 45', 65'; Ball 59', 82' |

| 19 January 1992 8 | Arsenal | 3–2 | Abbeydale Alvechurch | Highbury |
| | Ball 20'; Wylie 30'; Churchman 71' (pen.) | Report | Markham 44'; Bradley 90+2' | Stadium: Highbury; Referee: J. Smith (Middlesex) |

| 2 February 1992 9 | Arsenal | 12–1 | Brighton & Hove Albion | Leyton |
| | McGloin 10', 13', 27', 82', 88'; Ball 20', 56'; Few 24'; Churchman 59' (pen.); Pealling 79'; Gale 81' (o.g.); Wylie 89' | Report | Banks 68' | Stadium: Hare & Hounds Ground |

| 9 February 1992 10 | Reigate | 0–4 | Arsenal |
| | | Report | Curley 25'; Ball 50', 64'; Sneddon 87' |

| 16 February 1992 11 | Milton Keynes | 0–11 | Arsenal |
| | | Report | Churchman 18', 20', 30', 37'; McGloin 46', 55', 64', 72', 82'; Ball 47', 84' |

| 15 March 1992 12 | Arsenal | 5–1 | Hassocks Beacon | Leyton |
| | Ball 15', 84', 89'; Churchman 42' (pen.); McGloin 73' | Report | Pratt 35' | Stadium: Hare & Hounds Ground |

| 12 April 1992 13 | Arsenal | 17–0 | Milton Keynes | Leyton |
| | Churchman; Ball; McGloin; Wylie; Barber; Mulligan; Olafsdottir | Report | | Stadium: Hare & Hounds Ground |

| 26 April 1992 14 | Town & County | 3–3 | Arsenal |
| | Goal | Report | McGloin; Mulligan; Wylie 90' |

=== WFA Cup ===
| 1 December 1991 Fourth round | Arsenal | 0–1 (a.e.t.) | Red Star Southampton | Leyton |
| 13:00 GMT | | Report | 112' | Stadium: Hare & Hounds Ground; Referee: M. Robinson (Middlesex) |

=== WFA National League Cup ===
| 8 March 1992 First round | Broadbridge Heath | 2–12 | Arsenal | Horsham |
| | Goal | Report | McGloin; Ball; Churchman; Curley; Olafsdottir | Stadium: Broadbridge Heath Sports Centre |

| 5 April 1992 Quarter-finals | Arsenal | 2–0 | Reigate | Leyton |
| 12:00 BST | McGloin 27'; Barber | Report | | Stadium: Hare & Hounds Ground |

| 10 May 1992 Semi-finals | Arsenal | 2–0 | Ipswich Town | Leyton |
| 14:00 BST | Ball; (o.g.) | Report | | Stadium: Hare & Hounds Ground; Referee: Ian Clarke (Coventry) |

| 24 May 1992 Final | Arsenal | 1–0 | Millwall Lionesses | Huyton |
| 16:00 BST | Churchman (penalty missed) 3'; Ball 28' | Report | | Stadium: Alt Park; Referee: Mr J.C. Smith |

== Arsenal reserves ==
=== Greater London Regional Women’s League Division One ===
| 29 September 1991 | Arsenal Reserves | 1–2 | Brentford | Walthamstow |
| | Melia | Report | Stuart; McGregor | Stadium: Douglas Eyre Sports Centre |

| 13 October 1991 | Arsenal Reserves | 4–0 | Basildon | Walthamstow |
| | | | | Stadium: Douglas Eyre Sports Centre |

| 20 October 1991 | Hillingdon | 0–5 | Arsenal Reserves |
| | | Report | Sneddon; Olafsdottir; Egan |

| 27 October 1991 | Wanstead | 0–8 | Arsenal Reserves |
| | | Report | Olafsdottir; Melia; Egan; Sneddon; Pile |
Note: Wanstead withdrew from league. Result expunged

| 17 November 1991 | Chelmsford | 2–3 | Arsenal Reserves |
| | Goal | Report | Egan; Slee; Sneddon |

| 24 November 1991 | Arsenal Reserves | 3–1 | Hackney | Walthamstow |
| | Pile; Egan; Sneddon | | Goal | Stadium: Douglas Eyre Sports Centre |

| 8 December 1991 | Arsenal Reserves | 7–0 | Chelmsford | Walthamstow |
| | Melia; Egan; Smith; Saunders (pen.); Barber; (o.g.) | Report | | Stadium: Douglas Eyre Sports Centre |

| 5 January 1992 | Arsenal Reserves | 7–0 | Broxbourne | Walthamstow |
| | McGloin; Sneddon; Melia; (o.g.) | Report | | Stadium: Douglas Eyre Sports Centre |

| 12 January 1992 | Basildon | 0–5 | Arsenal Reserves |
| | | Report | Townshend; Hayes; Melia; Bethi |

| 26 January 1992 | Brentford | 0–7 | Arsenal Reserves |
| | Penalty missed | Report | Melia; Townshend; Saunders (pen.); Mulligan |

| 9 February 1992 | Broxbourne | 1–3 | Arsenal Reserves |
| | Goal | Report | Pile; Melia; Mulligan |

| 23 February 1992 | Hackney | 0–5 | Arsenal Reserves |
| | | Report | Sneddon; Pile; McGloin; Clarke |

| 19 April 1992 | Arsenal Reserves | 9–0 | Hillingdon | Walthamstow |
| | Saunders (pen.); Mulligan; Sneddon; Birri (pen.); Egan; Slee | Report | | Stadium: Douglas Eyre Sports Centre |

| Arsenal Reserves | X–X | Wanstead | Walthamstow |
| | | | Stadium: Douglas Eyre Sports Centre |
Note: Wanstead withdrew from league

=== Greater London League Cup ===
| Walton | 4–7 | Arsenal Reserves |

| Arsenal Reserves | 10–0 | Hampstead |

| Arsenal Reserves | 4–1 | Wimbledon Reserves |
| Sneddon; Melia; Mulligan | Report | Goal |

| 2 February 1992 Quarter-finals | Arsenal Reserves | 9–0 | Millwall Lionesses Reserves |
| | Sneddon; Bethi |

| 8 March 1991 Semi-finals | Arsenal Reserves | 5–1 | Romford | Leyton |
| | Melia; Sneddon | Report | Goal | Stadium: Hare & Hounds Ground |

| 5 April 1992 Final | Arsenal Reserves | 2–1 | District Line | Walton-on-Thames |
| 16:30 BST | Sneddon; Mulligan | Report | 88' | Stadium: Stompond Lane; Referee: George Quarry |

== Arsenal thirds ==
=== Greater London Regional Women’s League Division Four ===
| Crystal Palace Eagle Reserves | 1–13 | Arsenal Thirds |
| Goal | Report | Townshend; Woodley; Garrett; Dineen; (o.g.); (o.g.) |

| Arsenal Thirds | 11–1 | Hackney Reserves |

| Hornchurch Reserves | 2–11 | Arsenal Thirds |

| Arsenal Thirds | 3–0 | Chislehurst |
| Townshend; Hayes; Palling | Report |

| Pinewood | 1–13 | Arsenal Thirds | Slough |
| Goal | Report | Russell; Townshend; Hayes; Palling; Dineen |

| Arsenal Thirds | 17–1 | Abbey Rangers |
| Townshend; Woodley; Palling; Wright; Hayes; Care; Lamont | Report | Goal |

| Bedfont United | 1–13 | Arsenal Thirds |
| Goal | | Palling; Townshend; Hayes; Z. White; N. Dineen; Wright |

| Abbey Rangers | 1–10 | Arsenal Thirds | Chertsey |
| Goal | Report | Wright; Townshend; Hayes; Woodley |

| Hackney Reserves | 8–0 | Arsenal Thirds |
| | Report | Palling; Wright; Woodley; Lamont; Smith; Battens |

| Chislehurst | 3–7 | Arsenal Thirds |
| Goal | Report | Townshend; Woodley; Hayes |

| Palace Eagle Reserves | 0–4 | Arsenal Thirds |
| | Report | Palling; Woodley; White; Deegan |

| Arsenal Thirds | ?–? | Pinewood |

| Arsenal Thirds | 0–0 | Hornchurch Reserves |
Note: Match awarded as a 0–0. Arsenal Thirds and Hornchurch Reserves deducted 1 point for non-fulfilment of fixture

| Arsenal Thirds | ?–? | Bedfont United |

=== Russell Cup ===
| Preliminary Round | Arsenal Thirds | 3–1 | Brentford |
| | Palling; Woodley; Townshend | Report | Goal |

| First Round | Arsenal Thirds | W–O | Dukes A S |

| Quarter Finals | Arsenal Thirds | 2–4 | Hillingdon |
| | Palling; Townshend | Report | Goal |

=== Anniversary Cup ===
| First Round | District Line Reserves | 1–6 | Arsenal Thirds |
| | Goal | Report | Townshend; Wright; Lamont; Woodley |

| Quarter-finals | Arsenal Thirds | 10–0 | Hornchurch |
| | Lamont; Palling; Wright; Dewer; Woodley; Battams; Townshend; Cantey; Dineen | Report |

| 8 March 1992 Semi-finals | Arsenal Thirds | 6–0 | Winchester | Walthamstow |
| | Woodley; Wright; Townshend; Palling; Lamont; Canty | Report | | Stadium: Wadham Lodge |

| 5 April 1992 Final | Arsenal Thirds | 1–3 | Lambeth | Walton-on-Thames |
| 12:35 BST | Lamont | Report | Goal | Stadium: Stompond Lane; Referee: Bob Marchant |

== See also ==
- List of Arsenal W.F.C. seasons
- 1991–92 in English football
