= 1992–93 WFA National League Cup =

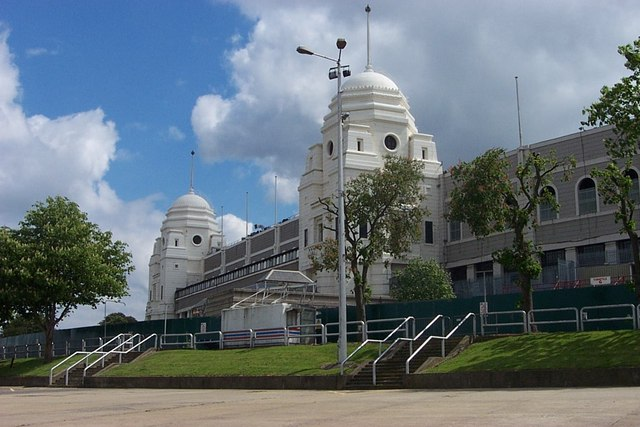
- The old Wembley Stadium

Tournament details
- Country: England
- Dates: 1992 – May 1993

Final positions
- Champions: Arsenal
- Runners-up: Knowsley United

The 1992–93 WFA National League Cup was a football competition in England organised by the Women's Football Association. It was the second edition of the competition, which was later run by the Football Association as the Women's Premier League Cup and is now known as the FA Women's National League Cup.

The League Cup included top-flight clubs from the season's 1992–93 WFA National League Premier Division and second-tier clubs of the Northern and Southern Divisions.

In the final at Wembley, the defending 1991–92 League Cup-winners, Arsenal, retained the trophy and completed a domestic treble in 1992–93.

== Wembley final ==
Arsenal and Knowsley United won their respective semi-finals against Wimbledon and Leasowe Pacific.

The 1992–93 competition ended with a final at Wembley Stadium in London. Kicking off at 12.15pm on 29 May 1993, the women's final was held prior to the men's Third Division play-off final at the venue.

Before a sparse crowd, Arsenal Ladies beat Knowsley United 3–0 to retain the trophy. The Liverpool Echo reported that the three Arsenal goals were all scored in the second half. Arsenal had won the WFA Cup a month earlier by the same scoreline.

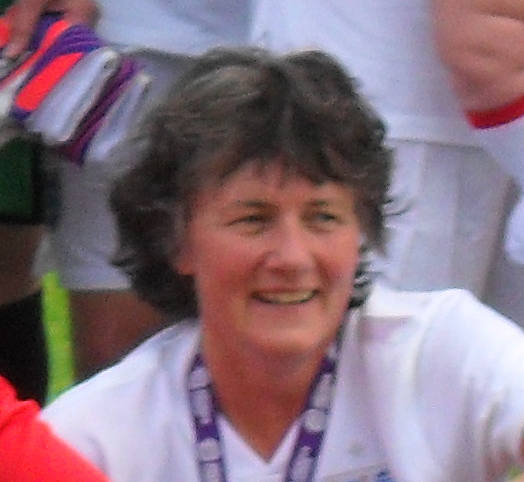
Clare Taylor

Knowsley's squad contained three England regulars, Karen Burke, Clare Taylor and Kerry Davis. Taylor was an international footballer and cricketer, and two months after the League Cup final she was in the England team that won the 1993 Women's Cricket World Cup on 1 August; she became the first woman to play in finals at Wembley and Lord's, and did so in the same year.

Arsenal manager Vic Akers recalled that the women's teams were not given use of the main dressing rooms at Wembley. "We changed in the opposite end to where the tunnel was."

This remains the only women's League Cup or National League Cup final to be played at Wembley. It is also one of the only competitive women's club games held at the old Wembley Stadium. Previously, the venue had hosted the England women's team and a 1990 friendly between Doncaster Belles and Friends of Fulham. The only regular women's football at Wembley has been the FA Cup final, annually since 2015.

== Results ==
=== First round ===
Matches were played on 18 October and 20 and 29 November 1992.

Red Star Southampton, Maidstone Tigresses, Wimbledon, Ipswich Town, Millwall Lionesses, Knowsley United and Stanton Rangers were all given byes into the next round.

Doncaster Belles, Abbeydale Alvechurch, Cowgate Kestrels, St Helens and Hemel Hempstead did not compete in the League Cup.

18 October 1992	Brighton & Hove Albion (S)	1–6	Leasowe Pacific (NO)
	Goal	Report	Thomas; Formston; Easton

18 October 1992	District Line (S)	4–1	Villa Aztecs (NO)
	Goal	Report	Goal

18 October 1992	Milton Keynes (NO)	0–8	Sunderland (NO)
		Report	Goal

18 October 1992	Nottingham Argyle (NO)	3–2 (a.e.t.)	Bristol Backwell (S)
	Goal	Report	Reilly; Craddock

18 October 1992	Oxford United (SO)	1–2	Epsom & Ewell (SO)
	Phillips 80'	Report	Condon 78', 81'

18 October 1992	Town & County (S)	1–2	Saltdean (S)
	Goal	Report	Goal

18 October 1992	Wolverhampton (NO)	3–1	Horsham (S)
	Kent; Guise	Report	Goal

29 November 1992	Sheffield Wednesday (NO)	1–0	Bronte (NA)
	Goal	Report

20 December 1992	Arsenal (NA)	8–0	Hassocks
	Couling; Churchman; Bampton; Ball	Report

=== Second round ===
Matches were played on 22 November 1992, 3 and 24 January, 14 February and 7 March 1993.

22 January 1992	Red Star Southampton (NA)	0–1	Knowsley United (NA)
		Report	Goal

22 November 1992	Sunderland (NO)	0–5	District Line (S)
		Report	Goal

22 November 1992	Wimbledon (NA)	4–0	Nottingham Argyle (NO)
	Goal	Report

3 January 1993	Arsenal (NA)	9–0	Saltdean United (S)
	Ball; Couling; Churchman; Wylie; Bampton	Report

24 January 1993	Sheffield Wednesday (NO)	0–2	Wolverhampton (NO)
		Report	Goal

24 January 1993	Maidstone Tigresses (NA)	2–2 (a.e.t.) (6–5 p)	Stanton Rangers (NA)
	Gilbert 79'; Corse (pen.)	Report	Brown 76'; (o.g.)
	Penalties
	Gilbert (penalty scored); Smith (penalty scored); Goodall (penalty scored); Bowling (penalty scored); Osborne (penalty scored); Clancy (penalty scored)		Penalty scored Penalty missed

14 February 1993	Epsom & Ewell (S)	1–3	Ipswich Town (NA)
	Condon 50'	Report	Osborne 5', 15'; Price

7 March 1993	Leasowe Pacific (NO)	7–0	Millwall Lionesses (NA)
	Thomas; Collins; Easton; Formston	Report

=== Quarter-finals ===
Matches were played on 24 January and 21 and 28 March 1993.

24 January 1993	District Line	1–5	Arsenal
	Grant 12'	Report	Ball 11'; Bampton 17'; Curley; Couling

21 March 1993	Ipswich Town (NA)	1–2	Wimbledon (NA)
	Goal	Report	Goal

21 March 1993	Knowsley United (NA)	2–0	Maidstone Tigresses (NA)
	Goal	Report

28 March 1993	Wolverhampton	1–3	Leasowe Pacific
	Goal	Report	Bertie; Formston; Berry

=== Semi-finals ===
Matches were played on 1 April and 18 April 1993.

18 April 1993	Wimbledon (NA)	2–4	Arsenal (NA)
	Benham 9', 75'	Report	Williams; Churchman; Ball; Bampton 87'

18 April 1993	Knowsley United (NA)	5–4	Leasowe Pacific (NO)
	Goal	Report	Thomas; Bostock

=== Final ===
29 May 1993
12:15 BST

Arsenal	3–0	Knowsley United
Ball 47'; Couling 61'	Report

Wembley Stadium, Wembley
