= 1992–93 WFA Cup =

Tournament details
- Country: England & Wales

Final positions
- Champions: Arsenal
- Runners-up: Doncaster Belles
- Penalty shoot-outs do not count towards the total number of goals.

The 1992–93 WFA Cup was an association football knockout tournament for women's teams, held between 13 September 1992 and 24 April 1993. It was the 23rd season of the WFA Cup and was won by Arsenal, who defeated Doncaster Belles in the final.

The tournament consisted eight rounds of competition proper.

All match results and dates from the Women's FA Cup Website.

== Group 1 ==
=== First round proper ===
All games were scheduled for 13 and 20 September 1992.

Tie	Home team (tier)	Score	Away team (tier)	Att.
1	Corematch	12–0	Thanet United	
2	Farnborough	11–0	Sutton United	
3	Portsmouth	2–1	Gosport Borough	
4	Teynham	3–0	Maidstone United	
5	Three Bridges	16–3	Buxted Rangers	
Bye: Brighton & Hove Albion, Epsom & Ewell, Hassocks, Havant, Horsham, Isle of Wight, Saltdean United

=== Second round proper ===
All games were originally scheduled for 4 and 11 October 1992.

Tie	Home team (tier)	Score	Away team (tier)	Att.
1	Brighton & Hove Albion	3–1	Hassocks	
2	Corematch	12–1	Three Bridges	
3	Havant	3–1	Farnborough	
4	Isle of Wight	2–9	Horsham	
5	Portsmouth	0–0 (a.e.t.)	Epsom & Ewell	
replay	Epsom & Ewell	6–0	Portsmouth	
6	Saltdean United	1–2	Teynham	

=== Third round proper ===
All games were originally scheduled for 11 November 1992.

Tie	Home team (tier)	Score	Away team (tier)	Att.
1	Epsom & Ewell	3–0	Teynham	
2	Havant	0–5	Brighton & Hove Albion	
3	Horsham	7–0	Corematch	

== Group 2 ==
=== First round proper ===
All games were scheduled for 13 and 20 September 1992.

Tie	Home team (tier)	Score	Away team (tier)	Att.
1	Bristol City	22–1	Bristol Rovers	
2	Cardiff	4–0	Clevedon Town	
3	Carterton	1–7	Torquay United	
4	Crewkerne	3–11	Eastleigh	
5	Newbury	H–W	Exeter Rangers	
W/O for Newbury
6	Plymouth Pilgrims	4–1	Solent	
7	Red Vale United	A–W	Tongwynlais	
W/O for Tongwynlais
8	Swansea	H–W	Salisbury	
W/O for Swansea
9	Swindon Spitfires	3–2 (a.e.t.)	Frome	
10	Truro City	H–W	Corsham Town	
W/O for Truro City
Bye: Bournemouth, Bristol Backwell

=== Second round proper ===
All games were originally scheduled for 4 and 11 October 1992.

Tie	Home team (tier)	Score	Away team (tier)	Att.
1	Bristol City	0–5	Bristol Backwell	
2	Newbury	3–1	Torquay United	
3	Plymouth Pilgrims	5–0	Eastleigh	
4	Swansea	0–3	Swindon Spitfires	
5	Tongwynlais	2–3	Cardiff	
6	Truro City	6–0	Bournemouth	

=== Third round proper ===
All games were originally scheduled for 11 November 1992.

Tie	Home team (tier)	Score	Away team (tier)	Att.
1	Newbury	3–4	Bristol Backwell	
2	Swindon Spitfires	2–2 (a.e.t.)	Cardiff	
replay	Cardiff	2–3 (a.e.t.)	Swindon Spitfires	
3	Truro City	4–2	Plymouth Pilgrims	

== Group 3 ==
=== First round proper ===
All games were scheduled for 13 and 20 September 1992.

Tie	Home team (tier)	Score	Away team (tier)	Att.
1	Binfield	4–0	Brentford	
2	Bromley Borough	6–0	SE Rangers	
3	Collier Row	7–0	Walton & Hersham	
4	Crystal Palace	2–3	Palace Eagles	
5	Leyton Orient	9–0	Aylesbury United	
6	Newham	4–6	Watford	
7	Reading	1–6	Hackney	
8	St Charles	A–W	Winchester All Stars	
W/O for Winchester All Stars
9	Yeading	0–4	Tottenham	
Bye: Abbey Rangers, District Line, London Girls

=== Second round proper ===
All games were originally scheduled for 4 and 11 October 1992.

Tie	Home team (tier)	Score	Away team (tier)	Att.
1	Abbey Rangers	1–11	Leyton Orient	
2	Collier Row	1–3	Hackney	
Collier Row progressed to the next round
3	District Line	26–0	London Girls	
4	Palace Eagles	2–9	Binfield	
5	Watford	3–1	Tottenham	
Tottenham progressed to the next round
6	Winchester All Stars	1–12	Bromley Borough	

=== Third round proper ===
All games were originally scheduled for 11 November 1992.

Tie	Home team (tier)	Score	Away team (tier)	Att.
1	District Line	10–0	Collier Row	
2	Leyton Orient	3–2	Binfield	
3	Tottenham	2–7	Bromley Borough	

== Group 4 ==
=== First round proper ===
All games were scheduled for 13 and 20 September 1992.

Tie	Home team (tier)	Score	Away team (tier)	Att.
1	Aston Villa	1–5	Tranmere Rovers	
2	Bangor City	0–6	Kidderminster	
3	Bentley Tigers	0–8	Thame United	
4	Crewe	5–1	Launton	
5	Runcorn	0–5	Pilkington	
6	Worcester City	6–8	Leek Town	
Bye: Abbeydale Alvechurch, Birmingham City, Oxford United, Stockport County, Villa Aztecs, Wolverhampton

=== Second round proper ===
All games were originally scheduled for 4 and 11 October 1992.

Tie	Home team (tier)	Score	Away team (tier)	Att.
1	Abbeydale Alvechurch	3–0	Stockport County	
2	Crewe	3–8	Pilkington	
3	Kidderminster	2–5	Oxford United	
4	Leek Town	3–0	Thame United	
5	Tranmere Rovers	8–2	Birmingham City	
6	Villa Aztecs	2–4 (a.e.t.)	Wolverhampton	

=== Third round proper ===
All games were originally scheduled for 11 November 1992.

Tie	Home team (tier)	Score	Away team (tier)	Att.
1	Abbeydale Alvechurch	6–0	Tranmere Rovers	
2	Leek Town	1–2	Wolverhampton	
3	Pilkington	1–2	Oxford United	

== Group 5 ==
=== First round proper ===
All games were scheduled for 13 and 20 September 1992.

Tie	Home team (tier)	Score	Away team (tier)	Att.
1	Atherton Laburnum	0–15	Ashton United	
2	Broadoak	3–1	Manchester City	
3	Liverpool	A–W	Lever Club	
W/O for Lever Club
4	Liverpool Feds	0–7	Preston Rangers	
5	Manchester United	5–0	Vernon–Carus	
6	Oldham Athletic	10–2	Rossendale	
Bye: Bolton, Bury, Leasowe Pacific, Rochdale, St Helens, Wigan

=== Second round proper ===
All games were originally scheduled for 4 and 11 October 1992.

Tie	Home team (tier)	Score	Away team (tier)	Att.
1	Bolton	0–6	Broadoak	
2	Bury	2–1	Preston Rangers	
3	Leasowe Pacific	6–0	Rochdale	
4	Manchester United	3–4	Ashton United	
5	St Helens	H–W	Lever Club	
W/O for St Helens
6	Wigan	7–2	Oldham Athletic	

=== Third round proper ===
All games were originally scheduled for 11 November 1992.

Tie	Home team (tier)	Score	Away team (tier)	Att.
1	Ashton United	4–5	Wigan	
2	Broadoak	0–8	Leasowe Pacific	
3	Bury	1–4	St Helens	

== Group 6 ==
=== First round proper ===
All games were scheduled for 13 and 20 September 1992.

Tie	Home team (tier)	Score	Away team (tier)	Att.
1	City Roses	3–8	Doncaster Town	
2	Cleveland	8–2	Bradford City	
3	Hull City	1–0	Barnsley	
4	Newcastle	11–0	Wiggington Grasshoppers	
Wiggington Grasshoppers proceed to the next round
5	Oakland Rangers	2–5	Brighouse	
Bye: Cowgate Kestrels, Huddersfield, Middlesbrough, Scarborough, Sheffield Wednesday, Sunderland

=== Second round proper ===
All games were originally scheduled for 4 and 11 October 1992.

Tie	Home team (tier)	Score	Away team (tier)	Att.
1	Cleveland	3–9	Sheffield Wednesday	
2	Cowgate Kestrels	2–0	Hull City	
3	Middlesbrough	13–1	Brighouse	
4	Scarborough	A–W	Wakefield	
W/O for Wakefield
5	Sunderland	2–4	Huddersfield	
6	Wiggington Grasshoppers	0–10	Doncaster Town	

=== Third round proper ===
All games were originally scheduled for 11 November 1992.

Tie	Home team (tier)	Score	Away team (tier)	Att.
1	Doncaster Town	1–2	Middlesbrough	
2	Huddersfield	0–0 (a.e.t.)	Sheffield Wednesday	
replay	Sheffield Wednesday	3–0	Huddersfield	
3	Wakefield	4–6	Cowgate Kestrels	

== Group 7 ==
=== First round proper ===
All games were scheduled for 13 and 20 September 1992.

Tie	Home team (tier)	Score	Away team (tier)	Att.
1	Calverton	A–W	Rainworth Miners Welfare	
W/O for Rainworth Miners Welfare
2	Haigh	7–2	Notts County	
3	Leicester City	3–1	Sporting Kesteven	
4	Sharley Park	5–1	Grimsby	
5	TNT	1–0	Derby City	
Bye: Highfield Rangers, Nettleham, Nottingham Argyle

=== Second round proper ===
All games were originally scheduled for 4 and 11 October 1992.

Tie	Home team (tier)	Score	Away team (tier)	Att.
1	Highfield Rangers	2–6	Rainworth Miners Welfare	
2	Leicester City	3–3 (a.e.t.)	Sharley Park	
replay	Sharley Park	3–4	Leicester City	
3	Nottingham Argyle	3–0	Haigh	
4	TNT	3–2	Nettleham	

=== Third round proper ===
All games were originally scheduled for 11 November 1992.

Tie	Home team (tier)	Score	Away team (tier)	Att.
1	Rainworth Miners Welfare	1–0	Nottingham Argyle	
2	TNT	2–0	Leicester City	

== Group 8 ==
=== First round proper ===
All games were scheduled for 13 and 20 September 1992.

Tie	Home team (tier)	Score	Away team (tier)	Att.
1	Chelmsford City	1–2	Colchester United	
2	Luton Town	9–1	Beccles	
3	Norwich	6–0	Woodham Wanderers	
4	Pye	3–4	Harlow Town	
5	Southend	4–1	Leighton Linslade	
6	Stevenage	1–9	Dunstable	
Bye: Milton Keynes, Town & County

=== Second round proper ===
All games were originally scheduled for 4 and 11 October 1992.

Tie	Home team (tier)	Score	Away team (tier)	Att.
1	Colchester United	0–10	Dunstable	
2	Luton Town	4–0	Harlow Town	
3	Southend	1–2	Milton Keynes	
4	Town & County	11–3	Norwich	

=== Third round proper ===
All games were originally scheduled for 11 November 1992.

Tie	Home team (tier)	Score	Away team (tier)	Att.
1	Dunstable	1–4	Town & County	
2	Luton Town	7–0	Milton Keynes	

== Fourth round proper ==
All games were originally scheduled for 6, 13 and 20 December 1992.

6 December 1992	Abbeydale Alvechurch (2)	2–3	Millwall Lionesses (1)
	Goal	Report	Goal

6 December 1992	Brighton & Hove Albion (2)	1–5	Arsenal (1)	Withdean
	Goal	Report	Ball; Churchman; McGloin; Pealling	Stadium: Withdean Stadium

6 December 1992	Bromley Borough (3)	3–0	Leyton Orient (3)
	Goal	Report

6 December 1992	Cowgate Kestrels (2)	2–3	Wimbledon (1)
	Goal	Report	Goal

6 December 1992	Doncaster Belles (1)	W–O	Knowsley United (1)
		Report

6 December 1992	Horsham (2)	2–3	Epsom & Ewell (2)
	Beer 50'; Lonsdale 67'	Report	Darby 35'; Whitton 80'; Roberts 87'

6 December 1992	Leasowe Pacific (2)	4–1	Bristol Backwell (2)	Moreton
	Thomas; Formston	Report	Goal	Stadium: Cuemasters Ground

6 December 1992	Luton Town (3)	0–9	Ipswich Town (1)	Langford
		Report	Goal	Stadium: Forde Park

6 December 1992	Middlesbrough (3)	5–0	Truro City (3)
	Goal	Report

6 December 1992	Rainworth Miners Welfare (3)	2–0	Oxford United (2)
	Goal	Report

6 December 1992	St Helens (2)	W–O	TNT (3)
		Report

6 December 1992	Wigan (3)	3–8	Bronte (1)
	Holland; Gorman; Leigh 90'	Report	Goal

13 December 1992	Stanton Rangers (2)	4–2	Sheffield Wednesday (2)
	Rose; Brown; Bourne	Report	Callaghan; Gray

13 December 1992	Swindon Spitfires (3)	0–4	Maidstone Tigresses (1)
		Report	Goal

13 December 1992	Wolverhampton (2)	0–4	Red Star Southampton (1)
		Report	Goal

20 December 1992	Town & County (2)	2–6	District Line (2)
	Goal	Report	Goal

== Fifth round proper ==
All games were played on 7 February 1993.

7 February 1993	Arsenal (1)	4–1	District Line (2)	Leyton
	Bampton 18'; Ball 42'; Churchman 47'; Wylie 74'	Report	Jones 71'	Stadium: Hare & Hounds Ground; Referee: G Pope (London)

7 February 1993	Bronte (1)	2–0	St Helens (2)
	Goal	Report

7 February 1993	Epsom & Ewell (2)	0–1	Red Star Southampton (1)
		Report	Goal

7 February 1993	Ipswich Town (1)	3–2	Stanton Rangers (1)
	(pen.); 82'	Report	Clay; Brown

7 February 1993	Leasowe Pacific (2)	2–5	Wimbledon (1)
	Cann; Thomas	Report	Goal

7 February 1993	Maidstone Tigresses (1)	2–0	Middlesbrough (3)
	Goal	Report

7 February 1993	Millwall Lionesses (1)	0–4	Doncaster Belles (1)
		Report	Walker 30', 80'; Coultard; Murray 82'

7 February 1993	Rainworth Miners Welfare (3)	1–4	Bromley Borough (3)	Rainworth
	Jones 90'	Report	McCormick 2' 61'; Powell (pen.)	Stadium: Welfare Ground

== Quarter–finals ==
All games were played on 7 March 1993.

7 March 1993	Arsenal (1)	5–1	Red Star Southampton (1)	Leyton
	Bampton; Pealling; Ball; Churchman	Report	Goal	Stadium: Hare & Hounds Ground; Referee: D. Martin (Nottinghamshire)

7 March 1993	Ipswich Town (1)	2–5	Doncaster Belles (1)
	26'; Kemp	Report	Lisserman; McQuiggan; Borman; Walker

7 March 1993	Maidstone Tigresses (1)	1–2	Bronte (1)
	Goal	Report	Goal

7 March 1993	Wimbledon (1)	1–2	Bromley Borough (1)
	Goal	Report	Goal

== Semi–finals ==
All games were played on 3 April 1993.

3 April 1993	Arsenal (1)	2–0	Bromley Borough (3)	Cambridge
11:00 BST	Bampton 52'; Ball 62'	Report		Stadium: City Ground; Referee: J Smith (Middlesex)

3 April 1993	Bronte (1)	1–2	Doncaster Belles (1)	Cambridge
15:00 BST	Lonergan 11'	Report	Walker 9'; Murray 44'	Stadium: City Ground; Referee: N Collins (Surrey)

== Final ==
24 April 1993
14:30 BST

Arsenal	3–0	Doncaster Belles
Curley 45'; Ball 45+8'; Bampton 80'	Report

Manor Ground, Oxford
Attendance: 3,547
Referee: Mike Cairns (Coventry)
