= 1991–92 WFA National League Cup =

Tournament details
- Country: England
- Dates: 1991 – May 1992

Final positions
- Champions: Arsenal
- Runners-up: Millwall Lionesses

The 1991–92 WFA National League Cup was a football competition in England organised by the Women's Football Association (WFA). It was the first edition of the Women's National League Cup, now run by the Football Association (renamed the Women's Premier League Cup from 1994 to 2018).

The Cup included top-flight clubs from the 1991–92 WFA National League Premier Division but was won by a second-tier club, Arsenal, from the Southern Division.

Arsenal became the first English women's League Cup winners, the team's first major trophy. The final was held at Alt Park, Knowsley, on 24 May 1992. Arsenal defeated Millwall Lionesses 1–0, with a 28th-minute goal by Naz Ball.

== Results ==
=== First round ===
All games were played on the 1 and 8 March 1992. Doncaster Belles, Knowsley United, Maidstone Tigresses, Notts Rangers, Spondon, Sunderland, Cowgate Kestrels and Milton Keynes did not compete in the League Cup.

1 March 1992	Abbeydale Alvechurch (S)	5–1	Town & County (S)
	Goal	Report	Goal

8 March 1992	Broadbridge Heath (S)	2–12	Arsenal (S)
	Goal	Report	McGloin; Ball; Churchman; Curley; Olafsdottir

8 March 1992	Davies Argyle (NO)	1–0	Red Star Southampton (1)
	Goal	Report

8 March 1992	Hassocks Beacon (S)	0–1	Wimbledon (NA)
		Report	Curl 80'

8 March 1992	Ipswich Town (NA)	2–1	Bronte (NA)
	Goal	Report	Goal

8 March 1992	Reigate (S)	1–0 (a.e.t.)	Sheffield Wednesday (NO)
	Hiscock 120'	Report

8 March 1992	Villa Aztecs (NO)	1–3	Brighton & Hove Albion (S)
	Goal	Report	Goal

8 March 1992	Wolverhampton (NO)	0–1	Millwall Lionesses (NA)
		Report	Goal

=== Quarter-finals ===
All games were played on 5 April 1992.

5 April 1992	Arsenal (S)	2–0	Reigate (S)
	McGloin 27'; Barber	Report

5 April 1992	Davies Argyle (NO)	2–1	Abbeydale Alvechurch (S)
	Goal	Report	Goal

5 April 1992	Ipswich Town (NA)	2–1	Brighton & Hove Albion (S)
	Goal	Report	Goal

5 April 1992	Wimbledon (NA)	0–0 (4–5 p)	Millwall Lionesses (NA)
		Report
	Penalties
	Penalty scored Penalty missed		Penalty scored

=== Semi-finals ===
All games were played on 10 May 1992.

10 May 1992	Arsenal (S)	2–0	Ipswich Town (NA)
	Ball; (o.g.)	Report

10 May 1992	Millwall Lionesses (NA)	3–2	Davies Argyle (NO)
	Goal	Report	White; Cronan

=== Final ===
24 May 1992

Arsenal	1–0	Millwall Lionesses
Ball 28'

Alt Park, Huyton

== See also ==
- 1992–93 WFA Women's National League Cup
