= 1991–92 WFA National League =

WFA National League
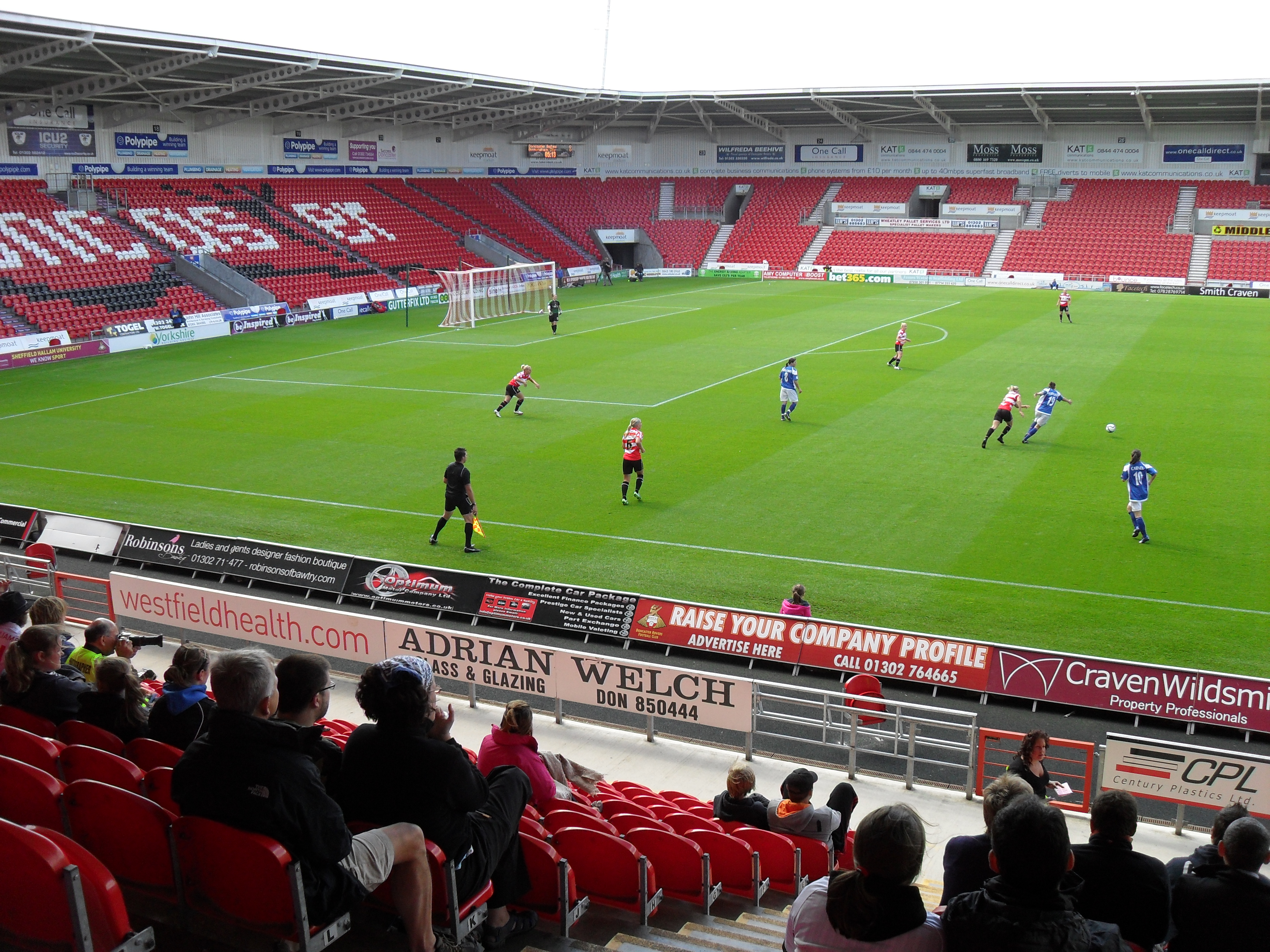
- Doncaster Belles were the League's first champions
- Season: 1991–92

The 1991–92 WFA National League was the inaugural season of the WFA National League, the beginning of nationalised women's league football in England. The Women's Football Association (WFA) obtained a grant from the Sports Council in order to launch the league, described by Jean Williams as "a crucial step in adopting the structures of the male game."

Manager Brian Broadhurst guided Doncaster Belles to the Women's National League championship with a 100% record. The Belles also avenged their defeat in the previous year's Women's FA Cup final to win a League and Cup double.

Red Star Southampton finished in second place, with player-manager Pat Chapman amongst many players who boasted England caps and FA Cup winners' medals from their days with Southampton Women. Veteran 47-year-old goalkeeper Sue Buckett had a record eight winners' medals from her 10 Cup final appearances, as well as 30 outings for England (1972–81, 1984).

Friends of Fulham, Women's FA Cup winners in 1985 and runners-up in 1989 and 1990, came under the auspices of Wimbledon and played their Premier Division home fixtures at Plough Lane, recently vacated by the male team. The squad included England internationals Theresa Wiseman, Marieanne Spacey, Brenda Sempare, Terri Springett (daughter of Ron) and Debbie Bampton.

Newton Ladies, a Merseyside club formed by former England midfielder Liz Deighan in May 1989, linked up with Knowsley United to join the league as Knowsley United. Deighan, also the WFA's England Under-21 team boss, led Knowsley to a fourth-place finish.

Millwall Lionesses had beaten Doncaster Belles in the previous season's FA Cup final but suffered a subsequent exodus of players. Lou Waller remained and Pauline Cope rejoined from Arsenal, to buttress a youthful squad.

== Premier Division ==
WFA National League Premier Division
- Season: 1991–92
- Champions: Doncaster Belles; 1st title
- Matches: 56
- Goals: 242 (4.32 per match)
- Top goalscorer: Karen Walker (36)
- Biggest home win: Doncaster Belles; 12–1 Notts Rangers (6 October 1991)
- Biggest away win: Knowsley United 0–13; Doncaster Belles (13 October 1991)
- Longest winning run: Doncaster Belles (14)
- Longest unbeaten run: Doncaster Belles (14)

Locations of the WFA National League Premier Division Teams
Locations of the WFA National League Premier Division Teams (Greater London)

=== League table ===
Pos	Team	Pld	W	D	L	GF	GA	GD	Pts	Qualification or relegation
1	Doncaster Belles (C)	14	14	0	0	89	4	+85	28	
2	Red Star Southampton	14	10	1	3	32	18	+14	21	
3	Wimbledon	14	8	2	4	34	27	+7	18	
4	Knowsley United	14	6	5	3	31	30	+1	17	
5	Maidstone Tigresses	14	3	4	7	13	35	−22	10	
6	Ipswich Town	14	2	4	8	15	42	−27	8	
7	Millwall Lionesses	14	2	2	10	11	30	−19	6	
8	Notts Rangers	14	1	2	11	17	56	−39	4	Merged with Spondon to form Stanton Rangers

Source: WFA NL
(C) Champions

No relegation as league expanded to 10 teams for 1992–93.

=== Results ===
Home \ Away	DON	IPS	KNO	MAI	MIL	NRA	RSS	WIM
Doncaster Belles	—	10–0	4–0	5–1	4–0	12–1	4–0	3–0
Ipswich Town	0–7	—	0–1	0–0	0–0	4–2	1–3	2–5
Knowsley United	0–13	2–2	—	0–0	4–1	6–2	2–2	1–1
Maidstone Tigresses	0–9	3–2	0–5	—	2–1	2–0	0–1	1–4
Millwall Lionesses	0–5	1–2	1–1	1–0	—	2–3	0–3	2–3
Notts Rangers	0–4	2–2	0–5	2–2	0–2	—	1–3	1–2
Red Star Southampton	1–4	3–0	2–1	3–0	2–0	5–1	—	3–1
Wimbledon	1–5	4–1	2–3	2–2	1–0	5–2	3–1	—

Source: WFA NL
Legend: Blue = home team win; Yellow = draw; Red = away team win.

== Division One North ==
WFA National League Division One North
- Season: 1991–92
- Champions: Bronte
- Promoted: Bronte
- Matches: 56
- Goals: 201 (3.59 per match)
- Biggest home win: Bronte 11–0 Sunderland (2 February 1992)

Map showing the locations of the teams in the Division One North of the WFA National League
Map showing the locations of the teams in the Division One North of the WFA National League

=== League table ===
Pos	Team	Pld	W	D	L	GF	GA	GD	Pts	Promotion or relegation
1	Bronte (C, P)	14	12	1	1	49	8	+41	25	Promotion to the Premier Division
2	Sheffield Wednesday	14	10	2	2	34	8	+26	22	
3	Davies Argyle	13	9	1	3	27	19	+8	17 (Note: Davies Argyle deducted two points for missing a fixture, away to Sunderland who were awarded the points.)	
4	Wolverhampton	14	5	2	7	23	30	−7	12	
5	Spondon	14	4	3	7	23	31	−8	11	Merged with Notts Rangers to form Stanton Rangers and moved to Premier Division
6	Sunderland	13	4	1	8	18	40	−22	11	
7	Cowgate Kestrels	14	5	0	9	19	20	−1	10	
8	Villa Aztecs	14	1	0	13	8	45	−37	2	

Source: WFA NL
(C) Champions; (P) Promoted
Notes:

No relegation as league expanded to 10 teams for 1992–93.

=== Results ===
Home \ Away	BRO	CWK	DAA	SHW	SPO	SUN	ASV	WOW
Bronte	—	4–2	4–0	1–1	2–3	11–0	3–0	4–0
Cowgate Kestrels	0–1	—	0–1	0–2	2–1	0–1	4–0	2–1
Davies Argyle	0–5	2–1	—	1–1	3–0	4–1	3–1	3–0
Sheffield Wednesday	1–2	1–0	5–0	—	2–1	5–0	3–0	2–0
Spondon	1–4	2–1	0–3	2–1	—	1–1	5–1	1–1
Sunderland	0–4	0–1	N/A	0–3	5–3	—	6–0	2–3
Villa Aztecs	0–3	0–4	1–5	1–2	2–0	0–1	—	1–4
Wolverhampton	0–3	4–2	0–2	0–5	3–3	5–1	2–1	—

Source: WFA NL
Legend: Blue = home team win; Yellow = draw; Red = away team win.

== Division One South ==
WFA National League Division One South
- Season: 1991–92
- Champions: Arsenal
- Promoted: Arsenal
- Matches: 56
- Goals: 344 (6.14 per match)
- Biggest home win: Hassocks Beacon 16–0; Milton Keynes (23 February 1992)
- Biggest away win: Milton Keynes 0–17 Arsenal (11 April 1992)
- Longest unbeaten run: Arsenal (14)
- Longest losing run: Milton Keynes (14)

Map showing the locations of the teams in the Division One South of the WFA National League
Map showing the locations of the teams in the Division One South of the WFA National League

=== League table ===
Pos	Team	Pld	W	D	L	GF	GA	GD	Pts	Promotion or relegation
1	Arsenal (C, P)	14	11	3	0	99	11	+88	25	Promotion to the Premier Division
2	Abbeydale Alvechurch	14	11	2	1	58	7	+51	24	Moved to Division One North
3	Hassocks Beacon	14	7	4	3	57	32	+25	18	
4	Town & County	14	7	2	5	52	35	+17	16	
5	Reigate	14	4	3	7	31	34	−3	11	
6	Brighton & Hove Albion	14	4	1	9	22	50	−28	9	
7	Broadbridge Heath	14	4	1	9	20	56	−36	9	
8	Milton Keynes	14	0	0	14	5	119	−114	0	Moved to Division One North

Source: WFA NL
(C) Champions; (P) Promoted

No relegation as league expanded to 10 teams for 1992–93.

=== Results ===
Home \ Away	ABA	ARS	BHA	BRH	HAS	MIK	REI	TAC
Abbeydale Alvechurch	—	1–1	9–0	1–0	2–2	7–0	4–0	4–0
Arsenal	3–2	—	12–1	15–1	5–1	11–0	7–1	5–0
Brighton & Hove Albion	0–2	0–7	—	2–1	1–2	8–2	1–1	1–4
Broadbridge Heath	0–9	0–8	1–2	—	1–5	5–2	2–0	1–4
Hassocks Beacon	1–5	1–1	3–2	3–1	—	16–0	1–1	4–4
Milton Keynes	0–9	0–17	0–2	0–1	0–10	—	0–3	0–12
Reigate	0–4	0–4	3–1	3–3	1–5	12–0	—	4–2
Town & County	0–3	3–3	3–1	2–3	8–3	6–1	4–2	—

Source: WFA NL
Legend: Blue = home team win; Yellow = draw; Red = away team win.

== See also ==
- 1991–92 WFA Women's National League Cup
