= Jo Churchman =

English footballer

Personal information
- Full name: Joanne Churchman
- Date of birth: 8 October 1963 (age 63)
- Position: Striker

Youth career
- Arlesey Youth Club

Senior career*
Years	Team	Apps	(Gls)
- Luton Daytels
–1987	Milton Keynes		
1987–1990	Millwall Lionesses		
1990–1995	Arsenal		
1995–2003	Langford		
- * Club domestic league appearances and goals

Joanne Churchman (born 8 October 1963) is an English former footballer who played as a forward. She spent 5 years at Arsenal, securing promotion to the National League Premier Division in 1992, and winning the club's first treble in the following season. After winning the Premier League National Division and FA Cup again in 1995, Churchman initially retired from the sport, but returned to play for local side Langford, where she played for the remainder of her career.

== Club career ==
Churchman was signed by Arsenal in 1990 from Millwall Lionesses, along with Sian Williams and Pauline Cope. In her first season, the club reached the FA Cup semi finals for the first time in their history, but were knocked out by Churchman's former club, Millwall Lionesses. In the Greater London Women's Regional League, they finished in third place, meaning they qualified for the newly formed WFA National League Division One South.

Arsenal began the new season in rampant form, hammering Broadbridge Heath 15–1, with Churchman scoring six of the goals. Churchman ended the season as Arsenal's top scorer in the League with 29 goals, as the Gunners won the Division One South Title and secured promotion to the Premier Division. They also claimed their first major trophy when they defeated Millwall Lionesses in the League Cup Final. Despite having an early penalty saved by Cope (who had since returned to Millwall Lionesses), Churchman helped win the match when her free kick was glanced home by Naz Ball.

1992–93 would prove to be Churchman's most successful season, as Arsenal completed a historic treble of League, League Cup and FA Cup. In March 1993, Churchman played at Highbury against Doncaster Belles, in front of what was then a record crowd for a Women's game, with 18,196 in attendance. Arsenal won the match 2–1, and their win against Red Star Southampton in May secured their first Premier Division title. By then, Churchman had already lifted the FA Cup, after defeating Doncaster Belles 3–0 in the Final. The treble was secured at Wembley Stadium, where it was Knowsley United who were beaten 3–0.

Arsenal were unable to defend their title in 1993–94, but Churchman was still able to lift silverware, scoring the final goal in a 4–0 win over Doncaster Belles in the 1994 League Cup Final with a 20-yard cross shot. By 1994–95, the arrivals of Becky Lonergan, Sammy Britton and Marieanne Spacey had become Arsenal's main source of firepower in attack. However, Churchman still had a crucial part to play in their attempt to win back the Premier League title. A late goal off the bench against Liverpool secured a crucial 1–0 win to fend off the chasing pack, with Arsenal eventually claiming their second Premier League title. At the end of the month, Churchman started the 1995 FA Cup Final, also against Liverpool, which Arsenal won 3–2.

The following season, Churchman initially retired from the sport, before opting to sign for lower-league Langford instead. There, she played out the remainder of her career, retiring from the sport completely in 2003.

== Honours ==
Arsenal

- WFA National League Division One South: 1991–92
- FA Women's Premier League National Division: 1992–93, 1994–95
- FA Cup: 1992–93, 1994–95
- FA Women's Premier League Cup: 1991–92, 1992–93, 1993–94
