= 1992–93 WFA National League =

WFA National League
- Season: 1992–93

The 1992–93 WFA National League season was the 2nd season of the WFA National League. The competition was organised by the Women's Football Association.

Arsenal won their first women's National League title, two points ahead of the previous champions of 1991–92, Doncaster Belles.

The 2–1 win for Arsenal against Doncaster in March at Highbury was instrumental in securing the championship, reportedly only the second defeat of Doncaster Belles in a league game in 15 years. Naz Ball scored the winning goal. The game (part of an Arsenal fundraising day for Michael Watson) had 18,196 fans, the Women's National League/Premier League attendance record.

Arsenal also completed a Treble by defeating Doncaster Belles in the 1993 WFA Cup Final and then beating Knowsley United in the 1992–93 National League Cup Final. Later, Arsenal repeated the domestic Treble in 2000–01 and 2006–07.

== Premier Division ==
WFA National League Premier Division
- Season: 1992–93
- Champions: Arsenal; 1st title
- Relegated: Maidstone Tigresses; Bronte
- Matches: 90
- Goals: 351 (3.9 per match)
- Biggest away win: Red Star Southampton 0–9 Doncaster Belles (16 May 1992)

Locations of the WFA National League Premier Division Teams
Locations of the WFA National League Premier Division Teams (Greater London)

Changes from last season:

- Bronte were promoted from Division One North as champions
- Arsenal were promoted from Division One South as champions
- Notts Rangers merged with Spondon and became Stanton Rangers

=== League table ===
Pos	Team	Pld	W	D	L	GF	GA	GD	Pts	Qualification or relegation
1	Arsenal (C)	18	17	0	1	66	8	+58	34	
2	Doncaster Belles	18	16	0	2	80	10	+70	32	
3	Knowsley United	18	11	1	6	37	33	+4	23	
4	Wimbledon	18	9	3	6	36	37	−1	21	
5	Red Star Southampton	18	7	3	8	37	41	−4	17	
6	Ipswich Town	18	7	3	8	31	49	−18	17	
7	Stanton Rangers	18	6	1	11	24	45	−21	13	
8	Millwall Lionesses	18	3	2	13	16	41	−25	8	
9	Maidstone Tigresses (R)	18	2	4	12	8	43	−35	8	Relegation to the Division One South
10	Bronte (R)	18	2	3	13	16	44	−28	7	Relegation to the Division One North

Source: WFA NL
(C) Champions; (R) Relegated

=== Results ===
Home \ Away	ARS	BRO	DON	IPS	KNO	MAI	MIL	RSS	STA	WIM
Arsenal	—	3–0	2–1	7–0	5–0	7–0	2–0	4–1	2–0	9–2
Bronte	0–2	—	0–6	1–2	1–3	1–1	1–0	0–2	1–1	0–3
Doncaster Belles	2–0	4–0	—	3–1	3–0	1–0	4–1	3–0	8–0	5–1
Ipswich Town	0–5	2–2	0–3	—	4–5	5–0	2–1	1–1	2–1	2–2
Knowsley United	0–2	3–1	1–7	4–0	—	0–0	4–1	3–0	3–0	4–2
Maidstone Tigresses	0–3	0–5	0–3	1–5	0–1	—	0–0	2–2	2–1	0–2
Millwall Lionesses	0–3	3–1	0–7	0–1	1–3	4–1	—	1–0	0–2	0–2
Red Star Southampton	1–4	3–1	0–9	8–0	4–2	2–0	5–2	—	1–2	2–2
Stanton Rangers	1–2	2–1	1–9	2–3	2–0	0–1	2–1	2–4	—	2–3
Wimbledon	0–4	4–0	3–2	3–1	0–1	1–0	1–1	3–1	2–3	—

Source: WFA NL
Legend: Blue = home team win; Yellow = draw; Red = away team win.

== Division One North ==
WFA National League Division One North
- Season: 1992–93
- Champions: Leasowe Pacific
- Promoted: Leasowe Pacific
- Relegated: Milton Keynes
- Matches: 90
- Goals: 528 (5.87 per match)
- Biggest home win: Sheffield Wednesday 17–0; Milton Keynes (21 March 1993)
- Biggest away win: Milton Keynes 1–12; Nottingham Argyle (6 December 1992)
- Longest winless run: Milton Keynes (18)

Map showing the locations of the teams in the Division One North of the WFA National League
Map showing the locations of the teams in the Division One North of the WFA National League

Changes from last season:

- Bronte were promoted from Division One North as champions
- Spondon moved to the Premier Division after merging with Notts Rangers
- St Helens were promoted to the Division One North
- Abbeydale Alvechurch moved from Division One South to Division One North
- Milton Keynes moved from Division One South to Division One North
- Davies Argyle became Nottingham Argyle

=== League table ===
Pos	Team	Pld	W	D	L	GF	GA	GD	Pts	Promotion or relegation
1	Leasowe Pacific (C, P)	18	16	1	1	100	21	+79	33	Promotion to the Premier Division
2	Nottingham Argyle	18	14	1	3	73	23	+50	29	
3	Abbeydale Alvechurch	18	11	3	4	62	20	+42	25	
4	Sheffield Wednesday	18	9	2	7	68	29	+39	20	
5	St Helens	18	9	1	8	67	49	+18	19	
6	Wolverhampton	18	7	3	8	52	37	+15	17	
7	Villa Aztecs	18	8	1	9	47	45	+2	17	
8	Cowgate Kestrels	18	6	3	9	32	51	−19	15	
9	Sunderland	18	2	0	16	19	103	−84	4	Resigned from the league after the end of the season
10	Milton Keynes (R)	18	0	1	17	8	150	−142	1	Qualification for the relegation playoffs

Source: WFA NL
(C) Champions; (P) Promoted; (R) Relegated

=== Results ===
Home \ Away	ABB	CWK	LEP	MIK	NOA	SHW	STH	SUN	ASV	WOW
Abbeydale Alvechurch	—	3–0	2–0	12–0	1–1	3–3	5–1	5–0	3–2	6–0
Cowgate Kestrels	1–6	—	4–6	W/O	1–6	3–1	3–3	4–1	5–1	0–4
Leasowe Pacific	3–1	5–0	—	11–0	3–0	5–2	7–1	9–1	5–0	6–2
Milton Keynes	1–4	2–2	0–11	—	1–12	0–9	0–4	2–6	0–6	1–9
Nottingham Argyle	2–1	0–2	1–4	16–0	—	4–2	4–3	7–1	6–1	1–0
Sheffield Wednesday	9–2	2–1	2–3	17–0	0–1	—	4–2	11–1	1–0	3–1
St Helens	2–1	4–1	1–5	10–0	0–2	0–3	—	10–1	5–2	3–2
Sunderland	0–1	0–3	1–10	4–0	1–4	0–7	2–11	—	0–3	0–2
Villa Aztecs	3–1	1–1	1–6	5–2	1–2	3–1	5–3	9–0	—	0–2
Wolverhampton	2–2	6–1	2–2	9–0	1–4	0–0	2–4	6–0	2–4	—

Source: WFA NL
Legend: Blue = home team win; Yellow = draw; Red = away team win.

=== Relegation Playoff ===
Division One South	Score	
Milton Keynes	w/o	Kidderminster Harriers

Milton Keynes chose not to contend the relegation playoff. Kidderminster Harries were promoted straight into Division One North for the following season.

== Division One South ==
WFA National League Division One South
- Season: 1992–93
- Champions: District Line
- Promoted: District Line
- Relegated: Saltdean
- Matches: 90
- Goals: 435 (4.83 per match)
- Biggest home win: Hassocks 8–1 Saltdean (8 November 1992)
- Biggest away win: Brighton & Hove Albion; 0–6 District Line (17 January 1993)
- Highest scoring: Saltdean 5–10 District Line (4 April 1993)

Map showing the locations of the teams in the Division One South of the WFA National League
Locations of the WFA National League Premier Division Teams (Greater London)

Changes from last season:

- Arsenal were promoted from Division One South as champions
- Abbeydale Alvechurch moved from Division One South to Division One North
- Milton Keynes moved from Division One South to Division One North
- District Line were promoted to Division One South
- Hemel Hempstead were promoted to Division One South
- Oxford United were promoted to Division One South
- Bristol Backwell were promoted to Division One South
- Saltdean were promoted to Division One South
- Reigate became Epsom & Ewell
- Hassocks Beacon became Hassocks
- Broadbridge Heath became Horsham

=== League table ===
Pos	Team	Pld	W	D	L	GF	GA	GD	Pts	Promotion or relegation
1	District Line (C, P)	18	15	1	2	93	31	+62	31	Promotion to the Premier Division
2	Hassocks	18	12	2	4	53	38	+15	26	
3	Town & County	18	9	2	7	51	39	+12	20	
4	Hemel Hempstead	18	8	4	6	38	37	+1	20	
5	Brighton & Hove Albion	18	8	2	8	41	42	−1	18	
6	Horsham	18	6	5	7	34	42	−8	17	
7	Oxford United	18	5	5	8	20	34	−14	15	
8	Epsom & Ewell	18	6	2	10	44	52	−8	14	
9	Bristol Backwell	18	4	3	11	31	50	−19	11	
10	Saltdean (R)	18	3	2	13	30	70	−40	8	Qualification for the relegation playoffs

Source: WFA NL
(C) Champions; (P) Promoted; (R) Relegated

=== Results ===
Home \ Away	BHA	BRB	DIL	EAE	HAS	HEH	HOR	OXU	SAL	TAC
Brighton & Hove Albion	—	5–1	0–6	5–0	0–1	2–0	3–1	1–1	1–1	6–3
Bristol Backwell	3–3	—	1–5	5–2	0–3	1–1	1–2	3–4	3–1	3–1
District Line	4–6	4–0	—	5–2	7–1	7–2	5–1	3–0	5–1	7–2
Epsom & Ewell	6–0	2–3	3–2	—	4–6	1–3	1–1	1–1	6–3	0–4
Hassocks	2–1	3–1	2–4	3–2	—	5–3	3–3	3–3	8–1	1–0
Hemel Hempstead	2–1	4–0	1–6	1–4	2–0	—	5–1	0–0	7–2	1–0
Horsham	2–1	2–2	1–6	0–3	3–2	1–1	—	1–1	6–1	4–1
Oxford United	0–4	2–1	0–4	2–1	1–4	1–2	1–0	—	0–1	1–3
Saltdean	5–2	3–1	5–10	0–3	1–3	2–2	1–3	1–2	—	1–6
Town & County	5–0	3–3	3–3	8–3	2–3	3–1	4–2	1–0	2–0	—

Source: WFA NL
Legend: Blue = home team win; Yellow = draw; Red = away team win.

=== Relegation Playoff ===
Division One South	Score	South East Counties League Division One
Saltdean	1–3	Bromley Borough

== See also ==
- 1992–93 WFA Women's National League Cup
- UEFA Women's Euro 1993 qualifying
