= 2015 FA Cup =

2015 FA Cup may refer to:

- 2014–15 FA Cup
  - 2015 FA Cup final
- 2014–15 FA Women's Cup
  - 2015 FA Women's Cup final
- 2015–16 FA Cup
- 2015–16 FA Women's Cup
