= Clare Taylor =

English sportswoman (1965)

Clare Taylor MBE
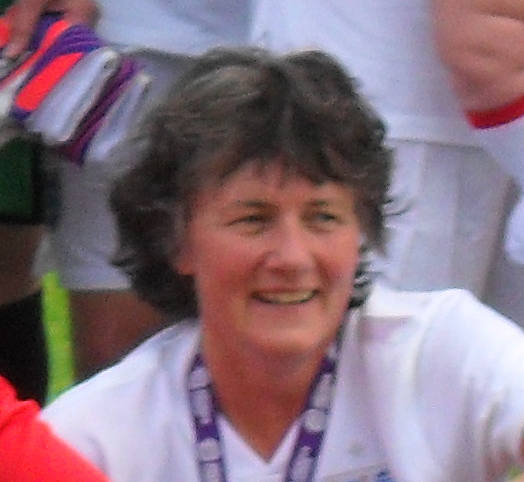
- Born: Clare Elizabeth Taylor; 22 May 1965 (age 61); Huddersfield, Yorkshire, England
- Height: 5 ft 7 in (1.70 m)
Association football career
- Position: Sweeper
Senior career*
Years	Team	Apps	(Gls)
- Bronte
- Liverpool Ladies
International career
1990–1995	England	32	(5)
- * Club domestic league appearances and goals
- Cricket career

Cricket information
- Batting: Right-handed
- Bowling: Right-arm medium
- Role: Bowler

International information
- National side: England (1988–2005)
- Test debut (cap 118): 17 November 1995 v India
- Last Test: 22 August 2003 v South Africa
- ODI debut (cap 53): 5 December 1988 v Ireland
- Last ODI: 30 August 2005 v Australia

Domestic team information
- Years: Team
- 1988–2006: Yorkshire
- 2000/01: Otago
- 2002/03–2010/11: Otago

Career statistics
Competition	WTest	WODI	WLA	WT20
Matches	16	105	310	19
Runs scored	226	303	2,395	222
Batting average	16.14	8.65	18.42	22.20
100s/50s	0/0	0/0	0/5	0/0
Top score	43	29	65*	36*
Balls bowled	2,383	5,140	14,987	341
Wickets	25	102	294	14
Bowling average	40.44	23.95	24.09	27.28
5 wickets in innings	0	0	0	0
10 wickets in match	0	0	0	0
Best bowling	4/38	4/13	4/5	3/32
Catches/stumpings	5/–	28/–	78/–	6/–
- Source: CricketArchive, 13 March 2021

Clare Elizabeth Taylor MBE (born 22 May 1965) is an English sportswoman, the first woman to have played on a World Cup team in both cricket and football. She represented England at both cricket, as a member of the winning World Cup cricket team in 1993, and football (World Cup 1995). Taylor attended Moor End Academy, her name was previously on the athletics record board but it has since been removed. Taylor was the first bowler for England to take 100 wickets in WODIs.

She was appointed Member of the Order of the British Empire (MBE) in the 2000 Birthday Honours "for services to Cricket, Association Football, and to Hockey."

== Football career ==
Taylor began playing at age 11 and after answering a Women's Football Association advert in Shoot magazine, started playing for Bronte Ladies. Her England debut came in a 2–0 defeat to Germany in Bochum on 16 December 1990.

When Bronte were relegated, Taylor moved to Knowsley United, joining in preference to the dominant Doncaster Belles because she wanted the challenge of playing for a developing club. Taylor played for Knowsley United in the 1992–93 WFA Women's National League Cup final, at Wembley, and two months later in the Cricket World Cup final at Lord's.

Knowsley United became Liverpool Ladies shortly after losing the 1994 FA Women's Cup Final to Doncaster Belles. Taylor's team, Liverpool, were also beaten in the following two seasons' FA Cup finals, by Arsenal (1995) and Croydon (1996) respectively.

During her amateur sporting career, Taylor was employed by the Royal Mail, though she noted: "The amount of time I spend away on unpaid leave has got beyond a joke." Although Taylor preferred football to cricket, she focused on cricket after being dropped from the England football team.

She was allotted 82 when the FA announced their legacy numbers scheme to honour the 50th anniversary of England’s inaugural international.

== Cricket career ==
One of the best bowlers in the women's game, Taylor represented the England women's cricket team from 1988 until 2005, and was an England team member when they won the 1993 World Cup final at Lord's Cricket Ground against New Zealand.
