= 1993 WFA Cup final =

English football cup final

- The match programme cover
- Event: 1992–93 WFA Cup
Arsenal	Doncaster Belles
3	0
- Date: 24 April 1993
- Venue: Manor Ground, Oxford
- Player of the Match: Lesley Shipp (Arsenal)
- Referee: Mike Cairns (Coventry)
- Attendance: 3,547

The 1993 WFA Cup final was the 23rd final of the Women's FA Cup, England's primary cup competition for women's football teams. The showpiece event was the last to be played under the auspices of the Women's Football Association (WFA) prior to their takeover by the Football Association (FA).

The final was contested between Arsenal and Doncaster Belles on 24 April 1993 at the Manor Ground in Oxford, with highlights broadcast the following day on Channel 4. Arsenal won 3–0 in front of a crowd of 3,547 to clinch their first WFA Cup. As their men's counterpart won the 1992–93 FA Cup, Arsenal became the first club since Southampton in 1976 to win both the men's and women's FA Cup in the same season.

== Match ==
=== Summary ===
In the first 20 minutes of the match, Gail Borman broke through Arsenal's defence on four separate occasions, but was repeatedly denied by Lesley Shipp in the Arsenal goal. Just before half-time the game swung decisively in Arsenal's favour. First Michelle Curley scored direct from a corner. Then Gillian Coultard was carried off with an injured shoulder following a collision with Debbie Bampton. Naz Ball quickly made it 2–0 by heading in Curley's cross to collect her 38th goal of the season and maintain her record of scoring in every round of the competition.

With 12 minutes remaining Paul Edmunds sent his wife Sheila Edmunds on as a substitute. But two minutes later Debbie Bampton headed Naz Ball's lob past Tracey Davidson to make the score 3–0 and secure the win for Arsenal. At full-time The FA chief executive Graham Kelly presented the trophy, remarking: "Doncaster lost because they didn't have the finishing touch". Arsenal goalkeeper Lesley Shipp was named Player of the Match.

=== Details ===
24 April 1993
14:30 BST

Arsenal	3–0	Doncaster Belles
Curley 45'; Ball 45+8'; Bampton 80'	Report

Manor Ground, Oxford
Attendance: 3,547
Referee: Mike Cairns (Coventry)

Arsenal	Doncaster Belles

GK	1	(England) Lesley Shipp
RB	2	(England) Kirsty Pealling
SW	4	(England) Vicki Slee	(substituted off) 37'
CB	5	(Northern Ireland) Gill Wylie (c)
CB	6	(England) Sharon Barber
LB	3	(England) Michelle Curley	(substituted off) 78'
DM	7	(England) Sian Williams
DM	8	(England) Debbie Bampton
AM	10	(England) Chris Couling
FW	9	(England) Jo Churchman
FW	11	(Wales) Naz Ball
Substitutes:
DF	12	(England) Kelley Few	(substituted on) 37'
MF	14	(England) Sarah Mulligan
FW	15	(Scotland) Michelle Sneddon
FW	16	(England) Debbie Smith
MF	19	(England) Lisa Spry	(substituted on) 78'
Manager:
(England) Vic Akers

GK	1	(England) Tracey Davidson
RB	2	(England) Julie Chipchase
CB	4	(England) Loraine Hunt	(substituted off) 78'
CB	6	(England) Michelle Jackson
LB	3	(England) Louise Ryde
RM	7	(England) Ann Lisseman
CM	8	(England) Gillian Coultard (c)	(substituted off) 45'
CM	5	(England) Jo Broadhurst
LM	11	(England) Jan Murray
FW	9	(England) Karen Walker
FW	10	(England) Gail Borman
Substitutes:
MF	12	(England) Joy McQuiggan	(substituted on) 45'
DF	14	(England) Lorraine Young
FW	15	(England) Sheila Edmunds	(substituted on) 78'
MF	16	(England) Karen Skillcorn
Manager:
(England) Paul Edmunds

Player of the match
Lesley Shipp (Arsenal)

Assistant referees:
D. Martin (Nottingham)
G. Panons (Oxford)
Reserve:
B.J. Brennan (Banbury)

Match rules

- 90 minutes.
- 30 minutes of extra-time if necessary.
- Penalty shoot-out if scores still level.
- Five named substitutes.
- Maximum of two substitutions.
