= 2015 Women's FA Cup final =

English football cup final

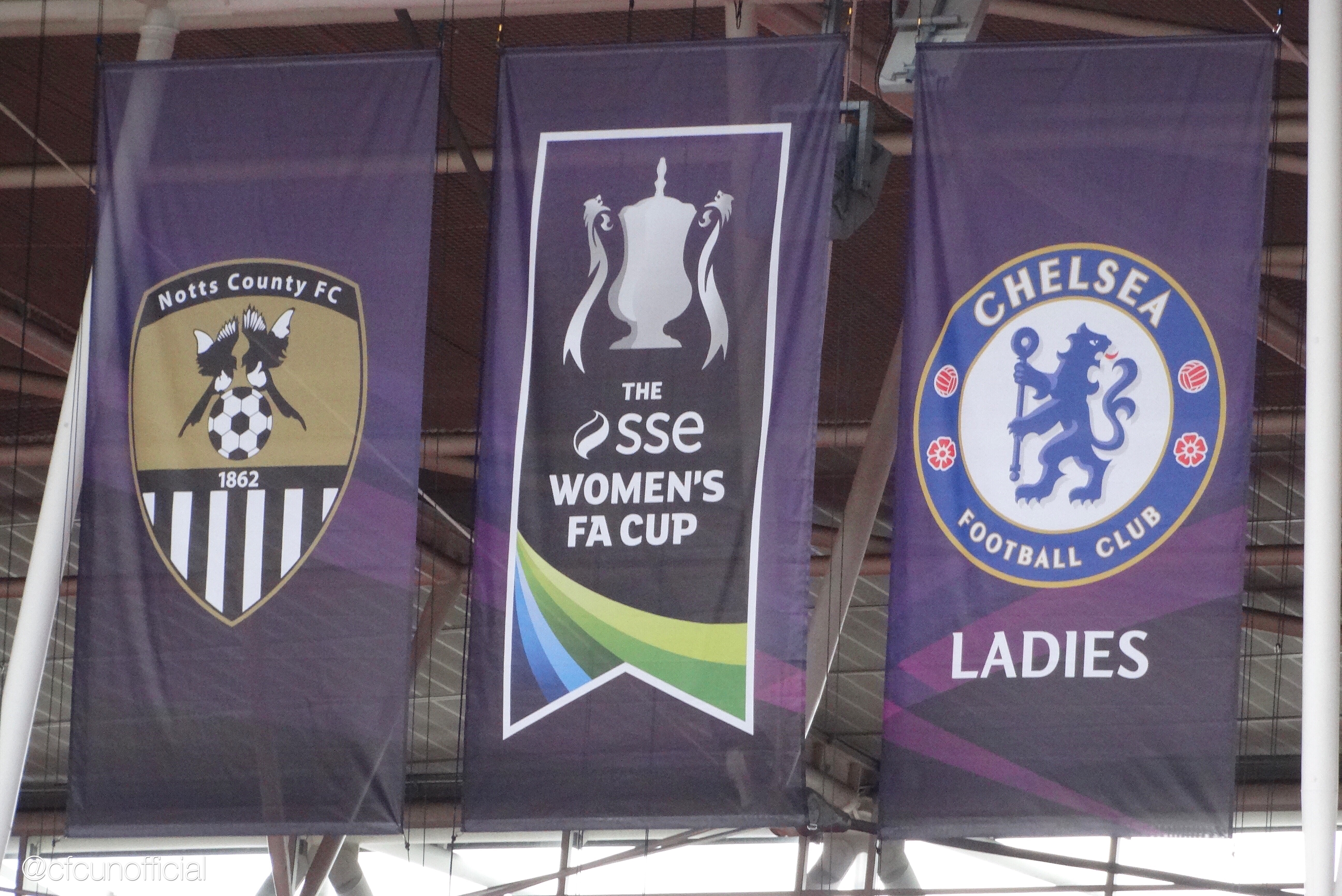
- Team flags flying at Wembley Stadium
- Event: 2014–15 Women's FA Cup
Chelsea	Notts County
1	0
- Date: 1 August 2015
- Venue: Wembley Stadium, London
- Player of the Match: Eni Aluko (Chelsea)
- Referee: Amy Fearn (Derbyshire)
- Attendance: 30,710
- Weather: Partly cloudy 23 °C (73 °F)

The 2015 Women's FA Cup final was the 45th final of the Women's FA Cup, England's primary cup competition for women's football teams. The showpiece event was the 22nd to be played directly under the auspices of the Football Association (FA). The competition was rebranded to become the Women's FA Cup final, and named the SSE Women's FA Cup final for sponsorship reasons.

The final was contested between Chelsea Ladies and Notts County Ladies on 1 August 2015 at Wembley Stadium in London. Chelsea made its second final appearance, after losing the 2012 final. Notts County appeared in its first ever final.

It was the first Women's FA Cup Final to be staged at Wembley, and was the first women's club final there since 1993. Watched by a record crowd of 30,710 and a BBC television audience of nearly two million, Chelsea won the match 1–0, with a first-half goal from Ji So-yun. Chelsea's Eniola Aluko was named player of the match.

== Route to the final ==
As FA WSL 1 clubs, both teams entered the competition at the fifth round stage. Chelsea beat Watford (6–0), holders Arsenal (2–1) and Manchester City (1–0) to reach the final. Notts County faced lower-division opponents in all three games, defeating Tottenham Hotspur (4–0), Aston Villa (5–1) and Everton (3–0).

The 2015 final marked the second time Chelsea had reached this stage, after losing in 2012 in a penalty shootout against Birmingham City. Notts County had never previously appeared in the final, since its founding in 2014 or as its predecessor Lincoln Ladies.

== Match ==
After a quiet start to the game, Chelsea winger Eniola Aluko applied the first serious pressure of the game with a shot at the 30th minute. A second soon after was deflected by Notts County's goalkeeper Carly Telford. The resulting corner setup Gemma Davison for a shot which went wide. In the 37th minute, Aluko found centre forward Ji So-yun inside the box and set her up for a short range goal. Notts County came back on the attack after the half. A long-range shot from midfielder Desiree Scott was deflected and a header by Leanne Crichton in the resulting corner was narrowly cleared off the line. Chelsea hunted for a second goal but Aluko had another shot deflected while midfielder Drew Spence sent a shot wide. In the end So-yun's lone goal proved enough and Chelsea won 1–0.

=== Details ===
1 August 2015
15:00 BST

Chelsea	1–0	Notts County
Ji 37'	Report

Wembley Stadium, London
Attendance: 30,710
Referee: Amy Fearn (Derbyshire)

Chelsea	Notts County

GK	1	(Sweden) Hedvig Lindahl
RB	3	(England) Hannah Blundell
CB	6	(Republic of Ireland) Niamh Fahey
CB	5	(England) Gilly Flaherty
LB	11	(England) Claire Rafferty
RM	24	(England) Drew Spence
CM	4	(England) Millie Bright
LM	17	(England) Katie Chapman (c)	(yellow card) 41'
RW	7	(England) Gemma Davison
CF	10	(South Korea) Ji So-yun		(substituted off) 90'
LW	9	(England) Eni Aluko		(substituted off) 81'
Substitutes:
GK	13	(England) Marie Hourihan
DF	16	(Portugal) Ana Borges		(substituted on) 81'
MF	19	(England) Laura Coombs		(substituted on) 90'
MF	20	(England) Jodie Brett
FW	23	(Sweden) Marija Banušić
Manager:
(England) Emma Hayes

GK	1	(England) Carly Telford
RB	14	(England) Sophie Walton
CB	23	(England) Laura Bassett (c)
CB	15	(England) Amy Turner
LB	3	(England) Alex Greenwood
RM	18	(Scotland) Leanne Crichton	(substituted off) 83'
CM	11	(Canada) Desiree Scott
LM	4	(England) Danielle Buet	(substituted off) 76'
RW	7	(England) Jess Clarke
CF	8	(England) Rachel Williams	(substituted off) 56'
LW	9	(England) Ellen White
Substitutes:
DF	30	(England) Laura Jayne O'Neill
MF	19	(England) Ashleigh Plumptre
FW	2	(England) Dunia Susi	(substituted on) 56'
FW	10	(Republic of Ireland) Fiona O'Sullivan	(substituted on) 83'
FW	20	(England) Aileen Whelan	(substituted on) 76'
Manager:
(England) Rick Passmoor

Player of the match
Eni Aluko (Chelsea)

Assistant referees:
Natalie Aspinall (Lancashire)
Jane Simms (West Yorkshire)
Fourth official:
Rebecca Welch (Durham)

Match rules

- 90 minutes.
- 30 minutes of extra-time if necessary.
- Penalty shoot-out if scores still level.
- Five named substitutes.
- Maximum of three substitutions.
