= Debbie Bampton =

English footballer (born 1961)

Debbie Bampton MBE
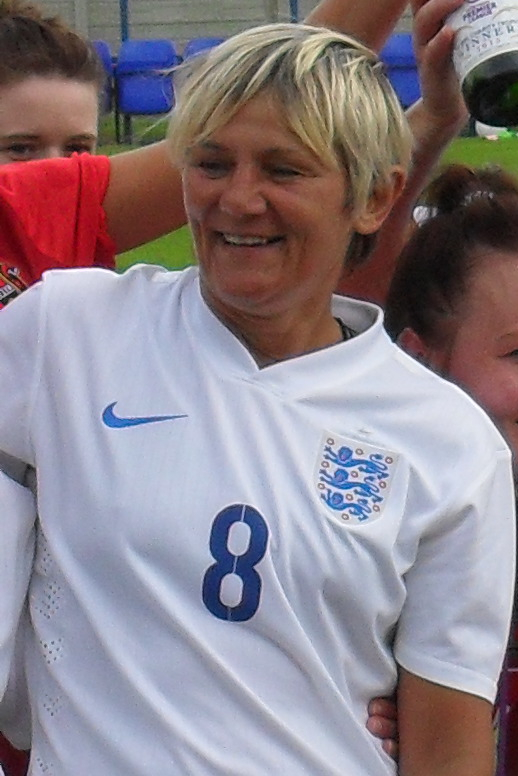

Personal information
- Full name: Deborah Bampton
- Date of birth: 7 October 1961 (age 65)
- Place of birth: England
- Position: Midfielder

Youth career
- Barnfield

Senior career*
Years	Team	Apps	(Gls)
?–1981	Maidstone		
1981–1983	Lowestoft		
1983–1985	Howbury Grange		
1985–1986	Millwall Lionesses		
1987–1988	Despar Trani 80		
1988–1991	Millwall Lionesses		
1991–1992	Wimbledon		
1992–1994	Arsenal		
1994–2000	Croydon		
2000	Doncaster Belles		
2004–2005	Eastbourne Borough		

International career
1978–1997	England	95	(7)

Managerial career
- 1994–2000: Croydon
- 2006–2008: Whitehawk
- * Club domestic league appearances and goals

Deborah Bampton MBE (born 7 October 1961) is an English former footballer who played as a midfielder. During her career, Bampton won a treble at Arsenal and two doubles with Croydon. She was also capped a total of 95 times for England, scoring seven goals in all.

== Club career ==
Bampton began her career at the age of 14. She played for Lowestoft Ladies, the team winning the Women's FA Cup in 1982, although Bampton missed the final due to injury. She then moved to captain Howbury Grange, managed by her father Albert. She was a member of the side that won the Women's FA Cup in 1984. In 1987 she moved to Italy, playing for Despar Trani 80 as a full–time professional alongside compatriot Kerry Davis. She spent just one season there, but won runners–up medals in both the Serie A and national Cup.

She joined Arsenal Ladies in 1992. Bampton thereafter won with Arsenal the treble of League Cup, Premier League and FA Cup in that being her first season at the club. Her following 1993–94 season was without fruit in comparison to prior. With this being so, Bampton left Highbury to become player-manager of Croydon Women in 1994. In the 1995–96 season, Croydon won the League title and the FA Women's Cup. Despite leaving the field after eight minutes due to injury, Bampton won her fifth FA Cup winners' medal when Croydon beat Liverpool in the 1996 final at the New Den. She won the league with Croydon twice more, before leaving to join Doncaster Belles as a player in 2000, after the Croydon club moved to Charlton.

In 2004, she joined Eastbourne Borough Ladies, a team her father was coaching. During their first season as a women's team, they went on to win the Sussex County Cup and the League Cup. The following year, she was inducted into the English Football Hall of Fame.

== International career ==
Bampton made her England debut whilst still at school, playing against the Netherlands in September 1978.

Bampton hit the winning goal in Denmark as England qualified for the 1984 European Competition for Women's Football final. In the second leg of the final at Kenilworth Road, Bampton scored in England's penalty shootout defeat to Sweden. In 1985, she became the England captain following the retirement of Carol Thomas, then England's most capped player and still the second longest serving captain. In 1991, she was injured and replaced as captain by Gillian Coultard. In 1995, new manager Ted Copeland restored her as captain, and she led the Three Lionesses into their first ever FIFA Women's World Cup appearance that year. Bampton recalled: "It was difficult, especially as Gill and I were roommates and at that point the England squad was split. A lot of people wanted Clare Taylor to be captain, but it was something I'd always wanted to do and so I just enjoyed it." She retained the captaincy for England's failed 1997 UEFA Women's Championship qualification campaign. In May 1997, Bampton made her final England appearance in a 6–0 friendly defeat to United States in Portland. She won 95 caps for England, scoring three goals altogether.

She was allotted 40 when the FA announced their legacy numbers scheme to honour the 50th anniversary of England's inaugural international.

== Playing style ==
Bampton was a tall, strong and industrious central midfielder. She characterised herself as "a box-to-box player" and said "I worked hard to win the ball, and I was always looking to make forward runs. I was not a natural goalscorer, but I did look to set up chances for others."

== Coaching career ==
In 1982, Bampton, alongside Audrey Rigby and Caroline Jones, was selected to join New Zealand club Auckland WFC as a player and as a coach. However, she suffered a broken leg, and had to be limited to coaching.

She joined the coaching staff of Whitehawk Ladies in the 2006 close season, along with former Arsenal Ladies and England player Angela Banks. In February 2008, she was manager of Whitehawk Ladies. Bampton joined the coaching staff of Lewes Ladies in January 2009.

== Personal life ==
Bampton is a supporter of Arsenal. She was appointed as a Member of the British Empire (MBE) in 1998 as a recognition of her services to women's football.

== Honours ==
=== Club ===
Lowestoft

- FA Women's Cup: 1982

Howbury Grange

- FA Women's Cup: 1984

Millwall

- FA Women's Cup: 1991

Arsenal

- WSL Cup: 1993
- Women's Premier League: 1993
- FA Women's Cup: 1993

Croydon

- Women's Premier League: 1996, 1999, 2000
- WSL Cup: 1996, 2000

=== Individual ===
- English Football Hall of Fame: 2005
