= Bronte L.F.C. =

Bronte
- Full name: Bronte Ladies Football Club
- Founded: 1968
- Dissolved: 1997; 28 years ago
- Ground: Roberts Park, Saltaire
Home colours

Bronte L.F.C. was an English women's football club based in Bradford in West Yorkshire. Founded by Bradford City FC director Bill Roper in 1968, the club began playing in the Yorkshire League before joining the North West Women's League in 1973. Bronte were invited to join the new Division One (North) in 1991 and won promotion into the national Premier League at the first attempt. However, Bronte finished bottom of the League with seven points in 1992–93. After a disastrous Northern Division campaign in 1995–96 which yielded only two points, Bronte folded during 1996–97.

== History ==
When the Women's Football Association formed a National League in 1991–92, North West Women's Regional Football League Bronte were admitted to the new Northern Division. The club narrowly beat Sheffield Wednesday to the title and took their place in an enlarged 10-team National Division for 1992–93. However Bronte's stalwart defender and captain Clare Taylor left for Knowsley United in the close season and without her the team performed poorly in the top division. A violent altercation on the team bus saw Chantel Woodhead being throttled and Samantha Britton punching the assailant. The club were relegated and in the subsequent player exodus Woodhead signed for Doncaster Belles, Britton and Rebecca Lonergan signed for Arsenal and Issy Pollard joined Millwall Lionesses.

== Former players ==
For details of all former players with a Wikipedia article, see Category:Bronte L.F.C. players.
