= Michelle Curley =

English footballer

Personal information
- Full name: Michelle Curley
- Date of birth: 30 April 1972 (age 54)
- Position: Left-back

Senior career*
Years	Team	Apps	(Gls)
1987–1998	Arsenal		

International career
	England	5	(0)
- * Club domestic league appearances and goals

Michelle Curley (born 30 April 1972) is a former England women's international footballer. Curley scored a goal in the 1993 WFA Cup Final victory for Arsenal.

== Club career ==
Curley won the Women's FA Cup twice with Arsenal during her career. The first was in 1993 when Arsenal beat Doncaster Belles 3-0, with Curley opening the scoring. The second was at Prenton Park in 1995 with a 3-2 victory over Liverpool.

== International career ==
In November 2022, Curley was recognized by The Football Association as one of the England national team's legacy players, and as the 92nd women's player to be capped by England.

== Honours ==
Arsenal

- FA Women's Cup: 1993, 1995
