= Ipswich Town F.C. Women =

Ipswich Town Football Club Women

Ipswich Town Women
- Full name: Ipswich Town Football Club Women
- Nicknames: The Blues, The Tractor Girls
- Ground: Colchester Community Stadium, Colchester; Portman Road, Ipswich
- Capacity: 10,105 (Colchester Community Stadium); 30,056 (Portman Road)
- Coordinates: 51°55′24″N 0°53′52″E; Colchester Community Stadium
- Owner: Gamechanger 20 Ltd
- Chairman: Mark Ashton
- Manager: David Wright
- League: Women's Super League 2
- 2025–26: WSL 2, 9th of 12
- Website: itfc.co.uk/itfc-women
Home colours	Away colours	Third colours

Ipswich Town Football Club Women is a women's team affiliated with Ipswich Town Football Club. The club currently competes in the Women's Super League 2, the second tier of women's English football.

They play their home games at Colchester Community Stadium in Colchester, the home of Colchester United, while also playing the occasional game at Portman Road. The club wears the traditional home colours of blue shirts with white shorts and blue socks. Like the men's team, they have a long-standing rivalry with Norwich City, against whom they contest the East Anglian derby, though in recent years the two clubs have been in separate leagues.

== History ==
It is unknown when the team was founded, but they are credited as being one of the first teams to compete in the newly founded Women's Premier League (now defunct) in 1991. The league was created to help bring women's regional football to a more national one and to bring it more in line with the male game. At the time, the league was seen as the tier 1 league in women's English football. Ipswich would go on to stay in the league for 2 more seasons until they were relegated to the Southern Division (now the FAWNL South Division) at the end of the 1993–94 season.

During the COVID-19 pandemic all football was stopped and the FA announced that all results for tiers 3–6 of women's football for the 2019–20 season were declared null and void, denying Town promotion despite being top of the league winning 11 out of 14 games and having a +42 goal difference at the time. When the 2020–21 season started, Town carried on their winning ways by winning their opening 4 games and sitting top of the league scoring 18 and conceding no goals before the season was halted again when the country went into another lockdown. After this lockdown and following a consultation from the FA, Town applied for promotion and were successful in their bid. Following promotion back to the FAWNL South Division, the club turned professional in June 2021 when Sophie Peskett signed Ipswich's first professional women's contract. This was soon followed when 8 further players, including Town's leading all-time scorer Natasha Thomas, all signed professional contracts.

Ipswich Town Women in 2023 during a match with Lewes FC Women

On 19 February 2024, it was announced that Ipswich Town Women would play their first ever game at Portman Road for the game on 23 March 2024 against Chatham Town, with all four stands being open for ticket sales. They went on to win the game 5–0 in front of an attendance of 10,173. On 19 November 2024, it was announced that Ipswich Town Women would return to Portman Road for the upcoming game on 23 March 2025 against Plymouth.

On 27 April 2025, Town went into their final game of the season against Cheltenham Town looking to secure promotion and the title. Already being 3 points ahead of 2nd place Hashtag United and having a far more superior goal difference, promotion looked guaranteed. Town went on to win the match 8–0, winning the league title and secured promotion to the Women's Super League 2 for the first time in the club's history. On 23 June 2025 it was announced that after more than a decade, Town would be leaving their home ground of Dellwood Avenue in Felixstowe and relocating to the Colchester Community Stadium in Colchester on a two year deal. Town's head of women's football (Rachel Harris) and chairman (Mark Ashton) announced that the move away from Dellwood Avenue had to be made following the promotion to the Women's Super League 2 and having to meet league standards, but were also working towards securing a permanent home for the women's team in the Ipswich area.

== Records and statistics ==
=== Player records ===
- Most appearances: Natasha Thomas, 260 (2015–2026)
- Most overall goals: Natasha Thomas, 175 (2015–2026)
- Most goals in a season: Natasha Thomas, 28 goals in the 2015–16 season

==== International ====
- First international appearance: Natasha Thomas for Jamaica against France on 25 October 2024
- Most international caps: Natasha Thomas, 6 caps for Jamaica as an Ipswich player

=== Club records ===
==== Matches ====
- Record league win: 13–0 against Milton Keynes Dons, Southern Premier Division, 27 October 2024
- Record FA Cup win: 12–0 against Milton Keynes Dons, first round, 3 November 2024
- Record league defeat: 9–0 against Millwall Lionessess, Southern Division, 22 March 2009
- Record FA Cup defeat: 10–0 against Manchester City, fifth round, 16 February 2020

==== Goals ====
- Most league goals scored in a season: 89 in 22 matches, Southern Premier Division, 2024–25
- Fewest league goals scored in a season: 14 in 22 matches, Southern Division, 2009–10
- Most league goals conceded in a season: 86 in 18 matches, Premier Division, 1993–94
- Fewest league goals conceded in a season: 10 in 22 matches, Southern Premier Division, 2024–25

==== Points ====
- Most points in a season: 58 in 26 games, Southern Premier Division, 2021–22
- Fewest points in a season: 6 in 18 games, Premier Division, 1993–94

==== Attendances ====
- Highest attendance at a home match:
  - Colchester Community Stadium: 1,462 (against Nottingham Forest), Women's Super League 2, 14 September 2025
  - Portman Road: 10,807 (against Plymouth Argyle), Southern Premier Division, 23 March 2025
  - Dellwood Avenue: 2,150 (against Cheltenham Town), Southern Premier Division, 27 April 2025
- Lowest attendance at a home match:
  - Colchester Community Stadium: 455 (against Leicester City), League Cup group stage, 24 September 2025
  - Portman Road: 9,142 (against Southampton), Women's Super League 2, 28 March 2026
  - Dellwood Avenue: 16 (against Actonians LFC), Division One South East, 8 January 2017

Note: Some club records before the 2003–04 season are missing

== Players ==
=== Current squad ===
As of 3 September 2026

Note: Flags indicate national team as defined under FIFA eligibility rules; some limited exceptions apply. Players may hold more than one non-FIFA nationality.

No.	Pos.	Nation	Player
1	GK	ENG	Natalia Negri
2	DF	ENG	Maria Boswell (captain)
3	DF	ENG	Jorja Fox
4	DF	SCO	Georgia Hunter
5	DF	SCO	Kenzie Weir
6	MF	ENG	Leah Mitchell
7	FW	SCO	Rosie Livingstone
8	MF	IRL	Jenna Slattery
9	FW	ENG	Georgia Timms
10	MF	ENG	Lucy O'Brien
11	FW	ENG	Megan Hornby
15	FW	WAL	Mary McAteer (on loan from Charlton Athletic)
16	FW	ENG	Kit Graham

No.	Pos.	Nation	Player
17	FW	ENG	Tegan McGowan
18	FW	SCO	Eilidh Adams
20	DF	SCO	Megan Wearing
21	MF	SCO	Colette Cavanagh
22	DF	ENG	Bethan Roe
23	DF	SCO	Emma Lawton
24	DF	ENG	Paige Peake
25	MF	ENG	Lucy Ashworth-Clifford
29	MF	ENG	Jenna Dear
32	FW	MAR	Rosella Ayane
44	GK	CAN	Lysianne Proulx
66	MF	ENG	Aimee Palmer
99	FW	ENG	Princess Ademiluyi (on loan from Gotham)

=== Out on loan ===
Note: Flags indicate national team as defined under FIFA eligibility rules; some limited exceptions apply. Players may hold more than one non-FIFA nationality.

No.	Pos.	Nation	Player
12	DF	NZL	Grace Neville (at Watford until 31 May 2027)
31	GK	ENG	Laura Hartley (at Hashtag United until 31 May 2027)

== Club officials ==
=== Coaching staff ===
Position	Name
Manager	(England) David Wright
Assistant Managers	(England) Lauren Phillips (England) Matt Pooley
Goalkeeping Coach	(England) Billy Johnson
Sports Scientist	(Scotland) Anna Youngs
Physiotherapists	(England) Mia Sibbons (England) Sadie-Jay Hunt
Lead Performance Analyst	(England) Abbie Fisher
Recruitment & Performance Analyst	(England) Alfie Remblance
Head of Player Development/ Academy Manager	(England) Phoebe Webb

=== Non-coaching staff ===
Position	Name
Head of Women's Football	(England) Rachel Harris
Technical Director	(Scotland) Sean Burt
Safeguarding & Player Care Officer	(England) Beth Morrell
Media & Communications Manager	(England) Howard Bloom

=== Managerial history ===
As of 24 April 2026

Name	Nationality	From	To	Ref
Ralph Pruden	England	2014	21 May 2018	
Carla Dickinson	England	21 July 2018	14 February 2019	
Joe Sheehan	England	February 2019	6 January 2026	
David Wright	England	6 January 2026 (Note: Wright was confirmed as the permanent manager on 24 April 2026)	Present	

== Current season ==
=== Women's Super League 2 ===
Pos	Team	Pld	W	D	L	GF	GA	GD	Pts	Qualification
1	Newcastle United	8	6	2	0	19	3	+16	20	Promotion to the WSL (Note: Dependent on obtaining a licence.)
2	Sunderland	8	5	2	1	16	8	+8	17	Qualification for pre-qualifying play-off
3	Ipswich Town	8	5	2	1	13	7	+6	17	Qualification for pre-qualifying play-off
4	Bristol City	8	5	1	2	17	11	+6	16	
5	Nottingham Forest	8	3	5	0	15	9	+6	14	

Updated to match(es) played on 15 November 2026. Source: WSL 2 League Table
Rules for classification: 1) Points; 2) Goal difference; 3) Number of goals scored

=== Women's FA Cup ===
As a WSL2 side, Ipswich enter the tournament in the third round and on 16 November were drawn against Southampton.

13 December 2026 Third round	Ipswich Town	v	Southampton	Colchester
13:00 GMT				Stadium: Colchester Community Stadium

=== WSL Players Cup ===
For the 2026–27 season, the WSL Players Cup format was restructured due to the increase of teams in the Women's Super League 2 and the increase of the overall teams in the competition. The format switched from multiple smaller groups to one league containing all teams (except those competing in the UEFA Women's Champions League) with each team only playing 6 games. The fixtures were selected as either northern or southern teams playing each other with the top 8 teams moving onto the knockout phase.

Pos	Grp	Team	Pld	W	PW	PL	L	GF	GA	GD	Pts
13	SR	Southampton	4	1	0	2	1	6	7	−1	5
14	SR	Wolverhampton Wanderers	4	1	1	0	2	4	12	−8	5
15	SR	Ipswich Town	4	1	0	1	2	6	5	+1	4
16	NR	Nottingham Forest	4	1	0	1	2	5	6	−1	4
17	NR	Newcastle United	4	1	0	0	3	6	7	−1	3

Updated to match(es) played on 18 November 2026. Source: WSL Football
Rules for classification: 1) Points; 2) Goal difference; 3) Number of goals scored; 4) Number of wins; 5) Head-to-head record

== Women's Player of the Year ==
Women's Player of the Year
Year	Name	Ref
2021–22	(England) Bonnie Horwood	
2022–23	(Scotland) Megan Wearing	
2023–24	(England) Sophie Peskett	
2024–25	(England) Sophie Peskett	
2025–26	(England) Sophie Peskett	

== Honours ==
League

- South East Combination League / FAWNL South Division (level 3)
  - Champions: 2007–08, 2024–25
  - Runners-up: 2022–23
- FAWNL South East Division (level 4)
  - Promotion: Ipswich were top of the league in both the 2019–20 and 2020–21 seasons, but due to the COVID-19 pandemic, no teams were promoted or relegated. Ipswich won promotion to the National League South via application at the end of the 2020–21 season.
