= Naz Ball =

Welsh footballer

Personal information
- Full name: Naldra Ball
- Date of birth: 28 February 1961 (age 64)
- Place of birth: Pwllheli, Wales
- Position: Striker

Senior career*
Years	Team	Apps	(Gls)
–1995	Arsenal		
1995–1997	Wembley		

International career
	Wales	5	(2)
- * Club domestic league appearances and goals

Naldra "Naz" Ball is a Welsh former football striker. She represented the Wales women's national football team and the English FA Women's Premier League clubs Arsenal and Wembley.

== Club career ==
In 1991–92, the first season of England's national women's league structure, Ball scored 23 goals as Arsenal pipped Abbeydale to promotion into the National Division. She also headed the winner in the inaugural Premier League Cup final in May 1992, as Arsenal beat Millwall Lionesses 1–0.

The following season Arsenal won a domestic treble. Ball scored in every round of the WFA Cup, and her headed goal in the 3–0 final win over Doncaster Belles was the 38th of a prolific campaign. She missed the first half of the 1993–94 season after being posted to the Falkland Islands with the RAF.

In April 1995, Ball, by then reduced to bit-part status, came on for the final two minutes of Arsenal's 3–2 FA Women's Cup final win over Liverpool Ladies. In 1995–1996 Ball played for Wembley Ladies – and won a last minute penalty kick as Wembley ultimately beat Doncaster Belles in the Premier League Cup final on 10 March 1996.

Ball featured for Wembley in the following season's 1–0 FA Women's Cup final defeat to Millwall Lionesses. She emerged from retirement to do so, aged 35, while working as an RAF stewardess.

== International career ==
Ball was capped at international level by Wales. In 1995 UEFA Women's Championship qualification Ball scored twice in her five appearances for Wales.
