= Three Bridges L.F.C. =

English women's football club based in Crawley in Sussex

Three Bridges L.F.C. was an English women's football club based in Crawley in Sussex. Founded as Horsham WFC in 1981, the club began playing in the Sussex Martlet League before joining the South East Counties League in 1989. The club were invited to join the new Division One (South) in 1991 under the name of Broadbridge Heath . After reverting to the Horsham name the club continued at Southern Division level until 1995, when the club amalgamated with Three Bridges FC to become Three Bridges L.F.C.. During this time Faye White joined the club at 13 and was fast-tracked into the first team at 14. White was called into the senior England squad at 16, the first female player from outside the top division of women's football to be called up for the national team.

White left for Arsenal in 1996 and Three Bridges folded in 2000 after suffering relegation and an exodus of players.
