= Millwall Lionesses F.C. =

Millwall Lionesses
- Full name: Millwall Lionesses; Football Club
- Nickname: The Lionesses
- Founded: 1973; 53 years ago
- Ground: St Paul's Sports Ground, Rotherhithe
- General Manager: Jason Vincent
- Manager: Ted Jones
- League: London and South East Women's Regional Football League Premier Division
- 2024–25: London and South East Women's Regional Football League Premier Division, 6th of 12
Home colours	Away colours

Millwall Lionesses Football Club (/ˈmɪlwɔːl/) is an English women's football club based in Rotherhithe, south-east London, that plays in the London and South East Women's Regional Football League Premier Division, the fifth tier of English women's football.

Founded in 1973, in Deptford, London, and coached by Richard Poole, the squad included Sue Prior who went on to become a prominent figure in the WFA, and Margaret Poole who went on to enjoy the international circuit and continues to play and advocate for the women's game in Australia today.

The group of women who made up the Lionesses were at first snubbed by Millwall F.C., but eventually went on to become the first women's football team to affiliate to a professional men's team, Millwall F.C., "The Lions". These early Lionesses represent the foundation of the modern women's game. The Lionesses went on to pioneer the now common "Football in the Community Scheme".

Millwall Lionesses is under the Millwall Community Trust and the side is currently managed by Ted Jones and assisted by Jack Wisson with club-captain being Jordan Butler.

== History ==
Millwall Lionesses remained an independent club in their initial years of existence. In the mid–1980s Millwall FC, who were trying to mitigate an appalling reputation for football hooliganism and racism, embraced the female club as part of their community project. Development officer Gary Stempel sourced funding from the Greater London Council (GLC) and then a combination of Lewisham and Greenwich Councils, as well as the Sports Council.

Millwall Lionesses became a leading force in both the women's game and the "Millwall Community Programme", and played an active part in the development of girls' football. Millwall Lionesses were the first club to have a female Centre of Excellence, of which there eventually became 42 in England. Millwall Lionesses field teams with an age range of eight, to thirty plus.

The former England women's national football team coach Hope Powell began her career with The Lionesses at the age of eleven, making her international debut at the age of 16.

The Lionesses won the FA Women's Cup in 1991 and 1997.

The Lionesses won promotion back to the FA Women's Premier League National Division in 2008–09, following an eight-year absence since their relegation in 2001.

In 2014 the Lionesses were founding members of the FA Women's Super League 2, the new 2nd tier of Women's football in England later renamed the FA Women's Championship.

In April 2018, the team announced the possibility of going into administration due to financial discrepancies and a lack of sponsorship.

In May 2019, shortly after the conclusion of the 2018–19 FA Women's Championship, it was announced that the Lionesses would split from Millwall F.C. forming a breakaway club named London City Lionesses. The FA Women's Championship licence was transferred to the new club.

Millwall Lionesses would be operated through the Millwall Community Trust, whilst playing their football in the Eastern Region Women's League. Colin Reid was appointed as manager, with St Paul's Sports Ground in Rotherhithe confirmed as their home venue.

The side is currently managed by Ted Jones and assisted by Jack Wisson with club-captain being Jordan Butler.
