= 1993–94 Arsenal L.F.C. season =

English women's football club season

Arsenal Ladies
1993–94 season
- Chairman: Peter Hill-Wood
- Manager: Vic Akers
- Stadium: Southbury Road
- National League: Runners Up
- FA Cup: Quarter Finals
- National League Cup: Winners
- Biggest win: 11–1 (vs Ipswich Town (A), National League, 21 November 1993)
- Biggest defeat: 2–3 (vs Wembley (H), National League, 06 March 1994); 0–1 (vs Knowsley United (H), FA Cup, 13 February 1994)
Home colours	Away colours

The 1993–94 season was Arsenal Ladies Football Club's 7th season since forming in 1987. The club participated in the Premier Division of the WFA National League, finishing runners up to Doncaster Rovers Belles They lost out on the FA Cup to Knowsley United, but won the League Cup, defeating Doncaster Rovers Belles in the Final.

This was Arsenal's sole season using Southbury Road as their main stadium. After this season, they moved to The Lantern Stadium in Potters Bar.

== Squad information & statistics ==
=== First team squad ===
Name	Date of Birth (Age)	Since	Signed From
Goalkeepers
(England) Lesley Shipp	25 October 1965 (aged 28)	1991	(England) Millwall Lionesses
(England) Kathy Simmons	7 January 1966 (aged 28)	1991	(England) Tottenham
(England) Nancy Jeffery	18 February 1978 (aged 16)	1989	(England) Limehouse
(England) Ruth Gold	8 March 1971 (aged 23)	1991	(England) Wimbledon
(England) Pauline Cope ‡	16 February 1969 (aged 25)	1994	(England) Millwall Lionesses
Defenders
(England) Kirsty Pealling	14 April 1975 (aged 19)	1987	(England) Arsenal Academy
(England) Michelle Curley	30 April 1972 (aged 22)	1988	(England) Arsenal Academy
(England) Jenny Canty	22 March 1976 (aged 18)	1991	(England) Limehouse
(England) Vicki Slee	9 March 1973 (aged 21)	1991	(England) Millwall Lionesses
(England) Kelley Few	17 October 1971 (aged 22)	1991	(England) Romford
(Northern Ireland) Gill Wylie (c)	27 August 1965 (aged 28)	1991	(England) Tottenham
(England) Kellie Battams	17 January 1977 (aged 17)	1989	(England) Arsenal Academy
(England) Amy Lamont	5 May 1974 (aged 20)	1989	(England) Arsenal Academy
(England) Lisa Spry	15 January 1968 (aged 26)	1989	(England) Islington
(England) Carly Cruickshank		1992	(England) Limehouse
Midfielders
(England) Sian Williams	2 February 1968 (aged 26)	1990	(England) Millwall Lionesses
(England) Debbie Bampton	7 October 1961 (aged 32)	1992	(England) Wimbledon
(England) Sarah Mulligan	22 July 1972 (aged 21)	1988	(England) Stevenage
(England) Emma Hayes	18 October 1976 (aged 17)	1991	(England) Arsenal Academy
(England) Sammy Britton	8 December 1973 (aged 20)	1993	(England) Bronte
(England) Emma Coss	9 May 1979 (aged 15)	1992	(England) Arsenal Academy
(England) Sharon Barber	27 May 1969 (aged 25)	1988	(England) Tottenham
(England) Michelle Lee	1974 (aged 20)	1988	(England) Arsenal Academy
(England) Sarah Clark	1972 (aged 22)	1993	(England) Ipswich Town
(England) Liz Benham	1975 (aged 18)	1993	(England) Wimbledon
Forwards
(England) Marieanne Spacey	13 February 1966 (aged 28)	1993	(England) Wimbledon
(Wales) Naz Ball	28 February 1961 (aged 33)	1987	(England) Aylesbury
(England) Jo Churchman	8 October 1963 (aged 30)	1990	(England) Millwall Lionesses
(Scotland) Michelle Sneddon	18 January 1974 (aged 20)	1989	(Scotland) Coltness
(England) Becky Lonergan	18 January 1977 (aged 17)	1993	(England) Bronte
(England) Kelly Townshend	12 May 1977 (aged 17)	1988	(England) Arsenal Academy
(England) Pat Pile	1964 (aged 30)	1989	(England) Hackney
(England) Andrea Wright		1989	(England) Chelmsford
(England) Debbie Smith		1992	(England) Southend
(England) Claudia Woodley		1991	(England) Arsenal Academy
(England) Karen Philp		1993	(England) Hassocks Beacon
(England) Krista Yeomans		1991	(England) Arsenal Academy
Unknown
Joanne Cook	1973 (aged 21)	1993	(England) Arsenal Academy

‡ = Signed in the summer of 1994, played in the delayed Premier League Cup Final

=== Goalscorers ===
Rank	Position	Name	NLPD	FA Cup	NL Cup	Total
1	FW	(England) Marieanne Spacey	18	5	9	32
2	FW	(Wales) Naz Ball	11	2	2	15
3	DF	(Northern Ireland) Gill Wylie (c)	7	3	3	13
4	FW	(England) Jo Churchman	6	0	4	10
4	FW	(England) Sammy Britton	7	1	2	10
6	MF	(England) Debbie Bampton	5	0	1	6
7	FW	(Scotland) Michelle Sneddon	3	0	2	5
8	FW	(England) Karen Philp	1	1	2	4
9	FW	(England) Becky Lonergan	1	0	2	3
10	DF	(England) Michelle Curley	1	0	0	1
10	MF	(England) Sian Williams	1	0	0	1
10	DF	(England) Kirsty Pealling	0	0	1	1
Unknown goalscorer			22	0	0	22
Own goal			3	0	1	3
Total			85	12	29	126

=== Clean sheets ===
Rank	Name	NLPD	FA Cup	NL Cup	Total
1	(England) Lesley Shipp	6	1	2	9
2	(England) Pauline Cope ‡	0	0	1	1
3	(England) Kathy Simmons	0	0	0	0
3	(England) Nancy Jeffery	0	0	0	0
Unknown goalkeeper		3	0	0	3
Total		9	1	3	13

‡ = Signed in the summer of 1994, played in the delayed Premier League Cup Final

== Transfers, loans and other signings ==
=== Transfers in ===
Announcement date	Position	Player	From club
August 1993	FW	(England) Marieanne Spacey	(England) Wimbledon
August 1993	MF	(England) Sammy Britton	(England) Bronte
August 1993	FW	(England) Becky Lonergan	(England) Bronte
August 1993	MF	(England) Sarah Clark	(England) Ipswich Town
October 1993	FW	(England) Karen Philp	(England) Brighton & Hove Albion
1993	MF	(England) Liz Benham	(England) Wimbledon

=== Transfers out ===
Announcement date	Position	Player	To club
1993	DF	(England) Gill Bordman	Retired
1993	FW	(England) Caroline McGloin	(England) Bromley Borough
1993	DF	(Republic of Ireland) Janet Clarke	(England) Bromley Borough
1993	MF	(England) Christine Couling	Retired
1993	MF	(England) Siobhan Melia	(England) Bromley Borough
1993	DF	(England) Paula Birri	(England) Bromley Borough
1993	MF	(England) Marlene Egan	(England) Bromley Borough
1993	GK	(England) Ruth Gold	(England) Wimbledon
1993	FW	(England) Alice Fairbank	(England) Ironesses
1993	DF	(England) Keeley Salvage	(England) Millwall Lionesses
1993	FW	(England) Sarah Ryan	(England) Millwall Lionesses
1993	DF	(England) Maria Luckhurst	
1993	DF	(England) Lesley Palling	
1993	FW	(England) Clare Healey	
1993	DF	(England) Annie Deegan	
1994	MF	(England) Sarah Mulligan	(England) Bromley Borough

== Club ==
=== Kit ===
Supplier: Adidas / Sponsor: JVC

Home	Away

== Non-competitive ==
=== Pre-season ===
Arsenal	8–0	St Olaf's Minnesota	Fawkham
	Report		Stadium: Gay Dawn Farm

Arsenal	5–0	Maidstone	Fawkham
	Report		Stadium: Gay Dawn Farm

Brighton and Hove Albion	1–4	Arsenal
Goal	Report	Sneddon; Wylie

== Competitions ==
=== Overall record ===
Competition	First match	Last match	Starting round	Final position	Record							
Competition	First match	Last match	Starting round	Final position	Pld	W	D	L	GF	GA	GD	Win %
WFA National League National Division	12 September 1993	22 May 1994	Matchday 1	2nd	18	14	3	1	85	15	+70	77.78
WFA Cup	5 December 1993	13 February 1994	Fourth round	Quarter-finals	3	2	0	1	12	3	+9	66.67
WFA National League Cup	31 October 1993	13 November 1994	First round	Winners	5	5	0	0	29	2	+27	100.00
Total					26	21	3	2	126	20	+106	80.77

Last updated: 22 May 2026
Source: WFA NL

=== WFA National League Premier Division ===
==== Partial league table ====
Pos	Team	Pld	W	D	L	GF	GA	GD	Pts
1	Doncaster Belles (C)	18	16	1	1	110	16	+94	49
2	Arsenal	18	14	3	1	85	15	+70	45
3	Knowsley United	18	13	2	3	62	30	+32	41
4	Wembley	18	9	2	7	33	33	0	29
5	Millwall Lionesses	18	8	2	8	38	46	−8	26

Source: WFA NL
(C) Champions

==== Results summary ====
Overall								Home						Away					
Pld	W	D	L	GF	GA	GD	Pts	W	D	L	GF	GA	GD	W	D	L	GF	GA	GD
18	14	3	1	85	15	+70	45	6	2	1	34	9	+25	8	1	0	51	6	+45

==== Results by matchday ====
Matchday	1	2	3	4	5	6	7	8	9	10	11	12	13	14	15	16	17	18
Ground	H	A	A	H	A	H	A	H	A	H	A	H	A	H	H	A	A	H
Result	W	W	W	D	W	D	W	L	D	W	W	W	W	W	W	W	W	W
Position	1	2	2	2	1	1	1	1	1	1	2	1	1	1	1	1	1	2

Source: WFA NL
W = Win; D = Draw; L = Loss

==== Matches ====
12 September 1993 1	Arsenal	7–0	Ipswich Town	Enfield
12:30 BST	Rushbrook 20' (o.g.); Spacey; Churchman; Bampton; Britton	Report		Stadium: Southbury Road; Referee: D. Kitchen

3 October 1993 2	Wembley	0–5	Arsenal	Wembley
		Report	Spacey 44', 80', 89', 90'; Curley 70'	Stadium: Vale Farm Sports Centre

17 October 1993 3	Red Star Southampton	0–7	Arsenal
		Report	Britton; Churchman; Spacey; Wylie; Sneddon

24 October 1993 4	Arsenal	2–2	Stanton Rangers	Enfield
13:00	Sturgeon (o.g.); Spacey	Report	Brown	Stadium: Southbury Road; Referee: D. Thomas

21 November 1993 5	Ipswich Town	1–11	Arsenal
	Goal	Report	Wylie; Spacey; Bampton; Williams; Churchman; Lonergan

12 December 1993 6	Arsenal	2–2	Knowsley United	Enfield
12:00 GMT	Bampton 15'; Spacey	Report	70'; 80'	Stadium: Southbury Road; Referee: B. Saville

6 February 1994 7	Wimbledon	2–9	Arsenal	Norbury
	(pen.); (pen.)	Report	Ball; Spacey; Churchman; Wylie	Stadium: Turle Road

6 March 1994 8	Arsenal	2–3	Wembley	Leyton
	Spacey 3'; Ball 25'	Report	Leech 52'; Jones 62'; Liran 88'	Stadium: Leyton Stadium

20 March 1994 9	Doncaster Belles	2–2	Arsenal	Doncaster
14:00 GMT	Jackson 60' (pen.), 79'	Report	Britton 20'; Ball 35'	Stadium: Belle Vue; Referee: G. Davies

27 March 1994 10	Arsenal	4–0	Leasowe Pacific	Beckenham
11:30 GMT	Ball; Philp; Spacey 75'	Report		Stadium: C.U.A.C.O Sports Ground; Referee: S . Russell

3 April 1994 11	Knowsley United	0–5	Arsenal	Huyton
		Report	Bampton; Britton; Churchman; Sneddon	Stadium: Alt Park

24 April 1994 12	Arsenal	4–0	Red Star Southampton	Leyton
	Britton; Ball	Report		Stadium: Lea Bridge Stadium

27 April 1994 13	Millwall Lionesses	0–6	Arsenal	Bermondsey
19:45 BST		Report	Goal	Stadium: Surrey Docks Stadium

1 May 1994 14	Leasowe Pacific	1–2	Arsenal	Moreton
	Bell	Report	Goal	Stadium: Cuemasters Ground

5 May 1994 15	Arsenal	7–0	Wimbledon	Enfield
	Goal	Report		Stadium: Southbury Road

12 May 1994 16	Arsenal	3–1	Millwall Lionesses	Highbury
	(pen.); Britton (red card)	Report	Goal	Stadium: Highbury

15 May 1994 17	Stanton Rangers	0–4	Arsenal	Ilkeston
11:00 BST		Report	Goal	Stadium: Hallam Fields

22 May 1994 18	Arsenal	3–1	Doncaster Belles	Hendon
11:30 BST	Spacey 20'; Wylie 68'; Britton 75'	Report	Skillcorn 6'	Stadium: Silver Jubilee Park; Referee: I. Knowles

=== FA Women's Cup ===
5 December 1993 Fourth round	Arsenal	8–0	Sheffield Wednesday	Enfield
12:00 GMT	Spacey; Wylie; Britton; Philp	Report		Stadium: Southbury Road; Referee: R. Chilvers

2 February 1994 Fifth round	Wembley	2–4	Arsenal	Wembley
	10' (o.g.); Liran 75' (pen.)	Report	Ball 40', 80'; Spacey 56', 76'	Stadium: Vale Farm; Attendance: 106

13 February 1994 Quarter-finals	Arsenal	0–1	Knowsley United	Enfield
12:00 GMT		Report	Gore 25'	Stadium: Southbury Road; Attendance: 50; Referee: R. Dowden

=== WFA National League Cup ===
31 October 1993 First round	Horsham	0–6	Arsenal	Broadbridge Heath
12:00		Report	Pealling 26'; Spacey 44'; Wylie 47', 90+2'; Philp 90+4'; Lonergan 90+6'	Stadium: Broadbridge Heath Sports Centre; Attendance: 250

28 November 1993 Second round	Kidderminster Harriers	0–6	Arsenal	Kidderminster
14:00		Report	Wylie 25'; Spacey; Philp; Britton; Churchman	Stadium: Aggborough Stadium

30 January 1994 Quarter-finals	Arsenal	9–1	Red Star Southampton	Merton
	Churchman; Ball; Spacey; Sneddon	Report	8'	Stadium: Old Rutlishians

10 April 1994 Semi-finals	Arsenal	4–1	Leasowe Pacific	Potters Bar
12:00 BST	Lonergan; Spacey; Bampton	Report	Thomas 53'	Stadium: The Lantern Community Stadium; Referee: G. Pope

13 November 1994 Final	Arsenal	4–0	Doncaster Belles	Cambridge
14:00 GMT	Britton 24'; Spacey 40'; Jackson 76' (o.g.); Churchman 79'	Report		Stadium: Abbey Stadium; Referee: D. Kitchen (Northamptonshire)

== Arsenal reserves ==
=== Greater London Regional Women’s League Premier Division ===
19 October 1993	Arsenal Reserves	6–0	Hackney
	Philp; Mulligan; Canty; Lonergan	Report

26 October 1993	Hackney	0–6	Arsenal Reserves

10 October 1993	Drayton Wanderers	0–8	Arsenal Reserves
			Cook; Pile; Clark; Townshend; Few

17 October 1993	Leyton Orient	?–?	Arsenal Reserves

24 October 1993	Tottenham Hotspur	?–?	Arsenal Reserves

31 October 1993	Arsenal Reserves	3–0	Wimbledon Reserves
	Sneddon; Cook	Report

7 November 1993	Queen's Park Rangers	?–?	Arsenal Reserves

14 November 1993	Arsenal Reserves	15–0	Watford
	Sneddon; Lonergan; Philp; Cook; Pile; Canty; Clark	Report

21 November 1993	Lambeth	1–6	Arsenal Reserves
	Goal	Report	Wright; Cook; Townshend; Allen; Clark; (o.g.)

5 December 1993	Arsenal Reserves	?–?	Leyton Orient

12 December 1993	Arsenal Reserves	?–?	Queen's Park Rangers

19 December 1993	Wimbledon Reserves	?–?	Arsenal Reserves

9 January 1994	Arsenal Reserves	?–?	Drayton Wanderers

16 January 1994	Arsenal Reserves	2–1	Brentford
	Slee; Lonergan		Goal

6 February 1994	Brentford	1–4	Arsenal Reserves

13 February 1994	Watford	?–?	Arsenal Reserves

27 February 1994	Lambeth	?–?	Arsenal Reserves

Arsenal Reserves	?–?	Tottenham Hotspur

=== Greater London Regional Women’s League Cup ===
Quarter-finals	Tottenham Hotspur	1–4 (a.e.t.)	Arsenal Reserves
	5'	Report	Lonergan; Wright

Semi-finals	Arsenal Reserves	2–0	Hackney
	Lonergan	Report

Final	Arsenal Reserves	2–2 (a.e.t.) (4–3 p)	Brentford
	Wright; Lee		85'
	Penalties
	Pile (penalty scored)		Penalty missed Penalty scored

== See also ==
- List of Arsenal W.F.C. seasons
- 1993–94 in English football
