= 1993–94 in English football =

Football in England
- Season: 1993–94

Men's football
- FA Premier League: Manchester United
- First Division: Crystal Palace
- Second Division: Reading
- Third Division: Shrewsbury Town
- Football Conference: Kidderminster Harriers
- FA Cup: Manchester United
- Football League Trophy: Swansea City
- League Cup: Aston Villa
- Charity Shield: Manchester United

Women's football
- National League Premier Division: Doncaster Belles
- National League Division One North: Wolverhampton Wanderers
- National League Division One South: Bromley Borough
- FA Women's Cup: Doncaster Belles
- National League Cup: Arsenal

The 1993–94 season was the 114th season of competitive football in England.

== Overview ==
From the start of this season, the Premier League was sponsored by Carling, an association which lasted for eight years. The Premier League was without a sponsor for the previous season.

== Events ==
- Manchester United broke the English transfer record before the start of the season by paying relegated Nottingham Forest £3.75million for midfielder Roy Keane.
- Graham Taylor resigned as England manager after their failure to qualify for the World Cup. He was succeeded by Terry Venables.
- Sir Matt Busby died on 20 January at the age of 84. He had been associated with Manchester United since being appointed manager at the end of the Second World War, and remained at the club as a director after calling time on his managerial career in 1969.
- Manchester United won the Premiership title and FA Cup to become only the fourth club this century to be league champions and FA Cup winners in the same season.
- Howard Kendall resigned three years into his second spell as Everton manager and was replaced by Norwich City's Mike Walker. They looked set for relegation from the Premiership on the final day of the season as they were 2–0 down to Wimbledon but turned the tables on their opponents to win 3–2 and beat the drop. Sheffield United went down instead.
- Swindon Town, in the top division for the first time, were relegated from the Premiership after collecting just five wins, conceding 100 goals in 42 games.
- Bryan Robson left Manchester United after 13 years to become player-manager of Middlesbrough in place of Lennie Lawrence.
- Huddersfield Town relocated from Leeds Road to the new Alfred McAlpine Stadium at Kirklees.
- After the end of the season, Tottenham Hotspur were docked five points and were found guilty of financial irregularities dating back to the 1980s and hit with the most severe punishment handed down on any English club: a £600,000 fine, 12 league points deducted for the 1994–95 season, and a one-year ban from the F.A Cup. The points deduction and FA Cup were eventually quashed after a series of appeals, although the fine was increased to £1.5million.
- Northampton Town, who spent one season in the top division during the 1960s, finished bottom of Division Three but retained their league status because Conference champions Kidderminster Harriers were unable to meet the Football League's minimum stadium capacity requirements. This was the first time that there had been no exits or arrivals in the Football League since the re-election system was scrapped in 1987.

== Notable debutants ==
15 September 1993: Darren Eadie, 18-year-old winger, makes his debut for Norwich City in their first-ever European fixture – the UEFA Cup first round first leg clash with Dutch side Vitesse Arnhem.

22 September 1993: Robbie Fowler, 18-year-old striker, makes his debut for Liverpool in their 3–1 win at Fulham in the Football League Cup second round first leg.

29 September 1993: Stephen Carr, 17-year-old Irish defender, makes his debut for Tottenham Hotspur in a Premier League fixture against Ipswich Town at Portman Road.

3 November 1993: Ade Akinbiyi, 19-year-old striker, makes his debut as a substitute for Norwich City in their UEFA Cup second round, second leg fixture with Bayern Munich at Carrow Road, which ends in a 1–1 draw.

4 May 1994: Michael Duberry, 17-year-old defender, played in Chelsea's final Premier League game of the season – a 2–1 home defeat by Coventry City.

== Top goalscorers ==
=== Premier League ===
- Andy Cole (Newcastle United) – 34 goals

=== Division One ===
- John McGinlay (Bolton Wanderers) – 25 goals

=== Division Two ===
- Jimmy Quinn (Reading) – 35 goals

=== Division Three ===
- Tony Ellis (Preston North End) – 26 goals

== Honours ==
Competition	Winner
FA Cup	Manchester United (8*)
League Cup	Aston Villa (4*)
FA Premier League	Manchester United (9/2*)
Football League First Division	Crystal Palace
Football League Second Division	Reading
Football League Third Division	Shrewsbury

Notes = Number in parentheses is the times that club has won that honour (First Division & Premier League). Number after slash is Premier League only. * indicates new record for competition

== England national team ==
Date	Opposition	Venue	Competition	Result	Score
8 September 1993	Poland	Wembley	World Cup Qualifier	Won	3–0
13 October 1993	Netherlands	Rotterdam	World Cup Qualifier	Lost	0–2
17 November 1993	San Marino	Bologna	World Cup Qualifier	Won	7–1
9 March 1994	Denmark	Wembley	Friendly	Won	1–0
17 May 1994	Greece	Wembley	Friendly	Won	5–0
22 May 1994	Norway	Wembley	Friendly	Drew	0–0

Even with the 7–1 victory over San Marino (in which Davide Gualtieri scores the fastest goal in FIFA World Cup qualification history). England fail to qualify for the finals of the 1994 World Cup and manager Graham Taylor resigns within days of the failure. Terry Venables is appointed as his replacement.

=== Qualifying group final positions ===
Team	Played	Won	Drawn	Lost	For	Against	Points
Norway	10	7	2	1	25	5	16
Netherlands	10	6	3	1	29	9	15
England	10	5	3	2	26	9	13
Poland	10	3	2	5	10	15	8
Turkey	10	3	1	6	11	19	7
San Marino	10	0	1	9	2	46	1

== League tables ==
=== FA Premiership ===
The second season of the Premier League saw Manchester United retain their title, taking the lead before the end of August and not surrendering it all season, holding a double-digit lead for much of it and eventually finishing eight points ahead of runners-up Blackburn Rovers, who had managed to draw level on points with them a few weeks before the season's end. United then went on to lift the FA Cup and become only the sixth team ever to win the double of the league title and FA Cup. Their top scorer and key player Eric Cantona was voted PFA Players' Player of the Year, while colleagues including Ryan Giggs, Paul Ince and Lee Sharpe also received many plaudits. Blackburn Rovers finished runners-up, thanks to Alan Shearer, whose 31 goals earned him the FWA Footballer of the Year award but weren't quite enough to gain his team the league title.

Newly promoted Newcastle United finished third, largely thanks to the 34 goals of PFA Young Player of the Year Andy Cole who was the division's top scorer and his formidable strike partner Peter Beardsley, as well as support from the likes of Rob Lee and Barry Venison. Fourth placed Arsenal won the European Cup Winners' Cup to claim their sixth trophy in eight seasons under manager George Graham. Leeds United completed the top five, recovering from their dismal Premier League debut the previous season, while unfancied Wimbledon achieved an impressive sixth-place finish.

The previous season's runners-up, Aston Villa, dropped to 10th place in the league but compensated for this with a League Cup triumph. Norwich, who had finished third the previous campaign, started the season well but their league form slumped after manager Mike Walker left for Everton in January and they finished twelfth, while Walker's new club only narrowly avoided relegation.

Swindon Town, in the top flight for the first time, endured a hopeless season with just five wins in the league, 100 goals conceded and no wins from their opening 16 games; they went bottom of the table after three games, and never left it. Oldham Athletic's three-year spell in the top flight came to an end after they failed to defeat Norwich on the final day of the season, just weeks after they had almost reached the FA Cup final before a last-gasp equaliser for Manchester United in the semi-final forced a replay, in which they were well beaten. The last relegation place went to Sheffield United, who were relegated in dramatic fashion when they suffered a last minute defeat to FA Cup finalists Chelsea. Their late collapse meant that Ipswich Town were the lucky side to preserve their top flight status.

Pos	Team	Pld	W	D	L	GF	GA	GD	Pts	Qualification or relegation
1	Manchester United (C)	42	27	11	4	80	38	+42	92	Qualification for the Champions League group stage
2	Blackburn Rovers	42	25	9	8	63	36	+27	84	Qualification for the UEFA Cup first round
3	Newcastle United	42	23	8	11	82	41	+41	77	Qualification for the UEFA Cup first round
4	Arsenal	42	18	17	7	53	28	+25	71	Qualification for the Cup Winners' Cup first round (Note: Arsenal qualified for the Cup Winners' Cup as the defending champions.)
5	Leeds United	42	18	16	8	65	39	+26	70	
6	Wimbledon	42	18	11	13	56	53	+3	65	
7	Sheffield Wednesday	42	16	16	10	76	54	+22	64	
8	Liverpool	42	17	9	16	59	55	+4	60	
9	Queens Park Rangers	42	16	12	14	62	61	+1	60	
10	Aston Villa	42	15	12	15	46	50	−4	57	Qualification for the UEFA Cup first round (Note: Aston Villa qualified for the UEFA Cup as League Cup winners.)
11	Coventry City	42	14	14	14	43	45	−2	56	
12	Norwich City	42	12	17	13	65	61	+4	53	
13	West Ham United	42	13	13	16	47	58	−11	52	
14	Chelsea	42	13	12	17	49	53	−4	51	Qualification for the Cup Winners' Cup first round (Note: Chelsea qualified for the Cup Winners' Cup as FA Cup runners-up, as winners Manchester United qualified for the Champions League.)
15	Tottenham Hotspur	42	11	12	19	54	59	−5	45	
16	Manchester City	42	9	18	15	38	49	−11	45	
17	Everton	42	12	8	22	42	63	−21	44	
18	Southampton	42	12	7	23	49	66	−17	43	
19	Ipswich Town	42	9	16	17	35	58	−23	43	
20	Sheffield United (R)	42	8	18	16	42	60	−18	42	Relegation to Football League First Division
21	Oldham Athletic (R)	42	9	13	20	42	68	−26	40	Relegation to Football League First Division
22	Swindon Town (R)	42	5	15	22	47	100	−53	30	Relegation to Football League First Division

Source: Premier League
Rules for classification: 1) points; 2) goal difference; 3) number of goals scored.
(C) Champions; (R) Relegated
Notes:

Leading goalscorer: Andy Cole (Newcastle United) - 34

=== League Division One ===
Alan Smith kicked off his management career by guiding Crystal Palace to the Division One title and regaining their Premiership place at first invitation. Frank Clark began Nottingham Forest's post Brian Clough era by helping them finish second to achieve promotion back to the top flight. They were joined by play-off winners Leicester City, who beat local rivals Derby County in the final which they finally won promotion to the Premiership after two successive play-off final defeats.

Notts County narrowly missed out on the play-offs, as did Wolverhampton Wanderers, who had just replaced Graham Turner as manager after nearly eight years with the former England manager Graham Taylor. Ninth placed Middlesbrough brought in Manchester United and former England captain Bryan Robson as their new player-manager at the end of the season to succeed Lennie Lawrence.

Oxford United's decline since losing their top flight status in 1988 continued as they slid into Division Two, along with Peterborough United (who had finished a strong 10th in the previous season, their first in the second tier) and Birmingham City. Newly promoted West Bromwich Albion narrowly avoided relegation at the expense of their local rivals, while Portsmouth's bottom half finish was a major disappointment after they had almost won promotion the previous season, although they did at least have the satisfaction of reaching the quarter-final of the League Cup and taking Manchester United to a replay. Luton Town endured a second successive struggle against relegation, eventually finishing a point above the drop zone, but enjoyed a run to the FA Cup semi-finals for the first time in nine years.

Pos	Team	Pld	W	D	L	GF	GA	GD	Pts	Qualification or relegation
1	Crystal Palace (C, P)	46	27	9	10	73	46	+27	90	Promotion to the Premier League
2	Nottingham Forest (P)	46	23	14	9	74	49	+25	83	Promotion to the Premier League
3	Millwall	46	19	17	10	58	49	+9	74	Qualification for the First Division play-offs
4	Leicester City (O, P)	46	19	16	11	72	59	+13	73	Qualification for the First Division play-offs
5	Tranmere Rovers	46	21	9	16	69	53	+16	72	Qualification for the First Division play-offs
6	Derby County	46	20	11	15	73	68	+5	71	Qualification for the First Division play-offs
7	Notts County	46	20	8	18	65	69	−4	68	
8	Wolverhampton Wanderers	46	17	17	12	60	47	+13	68	
9	Middlesbrough	46	18	13	15	66	54	+12	67	
10	Stoke City	46	18	13	15	57	59	−2	67	
11	Charlton Athletic	46	19	8	19	61	58	+3	65	
12	Sunderland	46	19	8	19	54	57	−3	65	
13	Bristol City	46	16	16	14	47	50	−3	64	
14	Bolton Wanderers	46	15	14	17	63	64	−1	59	
15	Southend United	46	17	8	21	63	67	−4	59	
16	Grimsby Town	46	13	20	13	52	47	+5	59	
17	Portsmouth	46	15	13	18	52	58	−6	58	
18	Barnsley	46	16	7	23	55	67	−12	55	
19	Watford	46	15	9	22	66	80	−14	54	
20	Luton Town	46	14	11	21	56	60	−4	53	
21	West Bromwich Albion	46	13	12	21	60	69	−9	51	
22	Birmingham City (R)	46	13	12	21	52	69	−17	51	Relegation to the Second Division
23	Oxford United (R)	46	13	10	23	54	75	−21	49	Relegation to the Second Division
24	Peterborough United (R)	46	8	13	25	48	76	−28	37	Relegation to the Second Division

Source: rsssf.com
Rules for classification: 1) Points; 2) Goals scored; 3) Goal difference
(C) Champions; (O) Play-off winners; (P) Promoted; (R) Relegated

Leading goalscorer: John McGinlay (Bolton Wanderers) - 25

=== League Division Two ===
Mark McGhee won the Division Two championship for Reading after their first successful season in years. They were joined by John Rudge's Port Vale in second place. Burnley triumphed in the Division Two playoffs to secure their second promotion in three seasons, beating a Stockport County side who lost at Wembley for the fourth time in three seasons. Peter Shilton oversaw Plymouth's best season for nearly a decade but they finished three points short of automatic promotion and lost to Burnley in the playoffs.

Going down to Division Three were Fulham (who would be in the league's lowest tier for the first time in their history), Hartlepool United, Exeter City and Barnet. Blackpool narrowly avoided relegation, but chairman Owen Oyston decided it was time for a change after three-and-a-half seasons under the management of Billy Ayre, and appointed Sam Allardyce as the club's new manager.

Pos	Team	Pld	W	D	L	GF	GA	GD	Pts	Promotion or relegation
1	Reading (C, P)	46	26	11	9	81	44	+37	89	Promotion to the First Division
2	Port Vale (P)	46	26	10	10	79	46	+33	88	Promotion to the First Division
3	Plymouth Argyle	46	25	10	11	88	56	+32	85	Qualification for the Second Division play-offs
4	Stockport County	46	24	13	9	74	44	+30	85	Qualification for the Second Division play-offs
5	York City	46	21	12	13	64	40	+24	75	Qualification for the Second Division play-offs
6	Burnley (O, P)	46	21	10	15	79	58	+21	73	Qualification for the Second Division play-offs
7	Bradford City	46	19	13	14	61	53	+8	70	
8	Bristol Rovers	46	20	10	16	60	59	+1	70	
9	Hull City	46	18	14	14	62	54	+8	68	
10	Cambridge United	46	19	9	18	79	73	+6	66	
11	Huddersfield Town	46	17	14	15	58	61	−3	65	
12	Wrexham	46	17	11	18	66	77	−11	62	
13	Swansea City	46	16	12	18	56	58	−2	60	
14	Brighton & Hove Albion	46	15	14	17	60	67	−7	59	
15	Rotherham United	46	15	13	18	63	60	+3	58	
16	Brentford	46	13	19	14	57	55	+2	58	
17	Bournemouth	46	14	15	17	51	59	−8	57	
18	Leyton Orient	46	14	14	18	57	71	−14	56	
19	Cardiff City	46	13	15	18	66	79	−13	54	
20	Blackpool	46	16	5	25	63	75	−12	53	
21	Fulham (R)	46	14	10	22	50	63	−13	52	Relegation to the Third Division
22	Exeter City (R)	46	11	12	23	52	83	−31	45	Relegation to the Third Division
23	Hartlepool United (R)	46	9	9	28	41	87	−46	36	Relegation to the Third Division
24	Barnet (R)	46	5	13	28	41	86	−45	28	Relegation to the Third Division

(C) Champions; (O) Play-off winners; (P) Promoted; (R) Relegated

Leading goalscorer: Jimmy Quinn (Reading) - 35

=== League Division Three ===
Shrewsbury Town, Chester City and Crewe Alexandra occupied the three promotion places in Division Three, while Martin O'Neill's Wycombe Wanderers won the playoffs in their first season of league football. The Chairboys beat Preston North End, whose manager John Beck was looking to repeat the same success he had enjoyed at Cambridge. Carlisle and Torquay were the losing semi-finalists, but it was a big step forward for two sides who had narrowly avoided relegation to the Conference a year earlier.

Northampton Town finished bottom of the league but were saved from demotion because Conference champions Kidderminster Harriers did not meet the league's stadium capacity requirements.

Wigan Athletic's first season at this level for over a decade brought their lowest ever finish of 19th place (89th out of the league's 92 clubs).

Pos	Team	Pld	W	D	L	GF	GA	GD	Pts	Promotion or relegation
1	Shrewsbury Town (C, P)	42	22	13	7	63	39	+24	79	Promotion to the Second Division
2	Chester City (P)	42	21	11	10	69	46	+23	74	Promotion to the Second Division
3	Crewe Alexandra (P)	42	21	10	11	80	61	+19	73	Promotion to the Second Division
4	Wycombe Wanderers (O, P)	42	19	13	10	67	53	+14	70	Qualification for the Third Division play-offs
5	Preston North End	42	18	13	11	79	60	+19	67	Qualification for the Third Division play-offs
6	Torquay United	42	17	16	9	64	56	+8	67	Qualification for the Third Division play-offs
7	Carlisle United	42	18	10	14	57	42	+15	64	Qualification for the Third Division play-offs
8	Chesterfield	42	16	14	12	55	48	+7	62	
9	Rochdale	42	16	12	14	63	51	+12	60	
10	Walsall	42	17	9	16	48	53	−5	60	
11	Scunthorpe United	42	15	14	13	64	56	+8	59	
12	Mansfield Town	42	15	10	17	53	62	−9	55	
13	Bury	42	14	11	17	55	56	−1	53	
14	Scarborough	42	15	8	19	55	61	−6	53	
15	Doncaster Rovers	42	14	10	18	44	57	−13	52	
16	Gillingham	42	12	15	15	44	51	−7	51	
17	Colchester United	42	13	10	19	56	71	−15	49	
18	Lincoln City	42	12	11	19	52	63	−11	47	
19	Wigan Athletic	42	11	12	19	51	70	−19	45	
20	Hereford United	42	12	6	24	60	79	−19	42	
21	Darlington	42	10	11	21	42	64	−22	41	
22	Northampton Town	42	9	11	22	44	66	−22	38	Reprieved from relegation

(C) Champions; (O) Play-off winners; (P) Promoted

Leading goalscorer: Tony Ellis (Preston North End) - 26

== Successful players ==
Eric Cantona received the PFA Players' Player of the Year award after his 25 goals in all competitions were the key force in Manchester United's double glory.

Alan Shearer was voted FWA Footballer of the Year after returning from injury to score 31 Premier League goals for runners-up Blackburn Rovers.

Andy Cole was voted PFA Young Player of the Year after finishing top scorer in the Premier League with 34 goals for newly promoted Newcastle United, who finished third and qualified for Europe for the first time since the 1970s.

Cole's veteran partner Peter Beardsley scored 24 goals in all competitions in his first season back on Tyneside.

Dean Saunders was again a consistent goalscorer for Aston Villa, who dipped to 10th in the league a year after finishing runners-up, but booked themselves another UEFA Cup campaign thanks to glory in the League Cup.

21-year-old striker Chris Sutton attracted huge attention from England's top clubs before his record-breaking transfer from Norwich City to Blackburn Rovers.

Stan Collymore established himself as one of the country's top marksmen as he powered Nottingham Forest back into the Premier League at the first attempt.

Veteran Reading striker Jimmy Quinn scored 35 league goals to lead his side to the Division Two title.

== Successful managers ==
Crystal Palace and Nottingham Forest gained promotion to the Premiership in their first season under the respective management of Alan Smith and Frank Clark.

Brian Little helped Leicester City win promotion to the Premiership.

Jimmy Mullen inspired Burnley's second promotion in two seasons as they won the Division Two playoffs.

Martin O'Neill helped Wycombe Wanderers gain their second successive promotion and earn a place in Division Two.

== Retirements ==
21 January 1994: Mel Sterland, 32-year-old Leeds United defender, retires after failing to overcome an achilles injury suffered more than a year ago.

2 May 1994: Frank Stapleton, 38-year-old former Arsenal and Manchester United striker, retires from playing after being dismissed as player-manager by Division Two club Bradford City.

9 May 1994: Paul Elliott, 30-year-old Chelsea central defender, retires from playing 20 months after suffering a serious knee injury for which he began a legal challenge against Dean Saunders, the former Liverpool striker who collided with him when he was injured.

31 May 1994: Kevin Moran, 38-year-old Blackburn Rovers central defender, announces his retirement as a player but will not retire completely until the end of the Republic of Ireland's World Cup campaign.

== Diary of the season ==
1 July 1993 – Barnsley appoint Sheffield Wednesday defender Viv Anderson as their player-manager to succeed Mel Machin.

5 July 1993 – Gordon Cowans begins his third spell at Aston Villa after joining them on a free transfer from Blackburn Rovers, while Nottingham Forest pay £2million for 22-year-old Southend United striker Stan Collymore.

9 July 1993 - Ian Porterfield returns to football management four months after being sacked by Chelsea to become the new Zambia national coach, just over two months after the previous national coach and 18 members of the national squad were killed in an air crash.

12 July 1993 - Veteran striker Mick Harford returns to the Premier League after four months in Division with Sunderland to sign for Coventry City in a £200,000 deal.

14 July 1993 – After Lee Chapman departs to Portsmouth on a free transfer, Leeds United replace him with record signing Brian Deane from Sheffield United for £2.9million, while England midfielder David Platt is transferred for the third year running when he leaves Juventus in a £5.2million move to Italian Serie A rivals Sampdoria.

15 July 1993 – Huddersfield Town manager Ian Ross pays the price for the club's horrid form in the first half of the previous season by being sacked. He is replaced by Neil Warnock, who recently left the manager's job at Torquay United.

16 July 1993 – Peter Beardsley returns to Newcastle United in a £1.4million move from Everton, six years after he left Tyneside for Liverpool.

20 July 1993 – For the first time in more than 40 years, the British transfer fee record is broken by a Scottish club rather than an English one, when Rangers sign Dundee United striker Duncan Ferguson for £4million.

22 July 1993 - Manchester United pay an English record fee of £3.75million for Nottingham Forest midfielder Roy Keane.

26 July 1993 – Aston Villa sign Republic of Ireland midfielder Andy Townsend from Chelsea for £2.1million.

29 July 1993 – Former Manchester United, Everton and Wales winger Mickey Thomas, 39, is sentenced to 18 months in prison for producing and distributing forged banknotes. This comes just eight days after he was in court to see two men sent to prison for assaulting him.

1 August 1993 – Guy Whittingham, whose 42 Division One goals weren't quite enough to get Portsmouth promoted to the Premier League last season, is transferred to Aston Villa for £1.2million. In Division Three, 37-year-old Keith Alexander becomes the first black manager of a Football League club when he takes over at Lincoln City.

4 August 1993 – John Smith, leader of the Labour Party, opens Millwall's New Den, a 20,000-seat stadium, which sees its first action in a friendly with Sporting Clube de Portugal that ends in a 2–1 win for the Lisbon club. The stadium was first planned in 1990 in the wake of the Taylor Report and was initially going to have a capacity of 25,000, but these plans were downsized as Millwall could not meet the cost.

7 August 1993 – Frank Clark is named as manager of Nottingham Forest, replacing Brian Clough, who retired earlier in the summer after 18 years at the helm. His first task is to guide Forest back into the Premier League after last season's relegation. On the same day, Ipswich Town manager John Lyall announces that he will become the club's director of football, and that Mick McGiven will take over as first-team manager. Manchester United win the FA Charity Shield on penalties after a 1–1 draw with Arsenal.

12 August 1993 – Chelsea buy midfielder Gavin Peacock from Newcastle United for £1.2million, while Everton's longest-serving player Kevin Ratcliffe leaves Goodison Park after 15 years and joins Cardiff City on a free transfer.

14 August 1993 – On the opening day of the Premier League season, Coventry City pull off a major surprise by beating Arsenal 3–0 in the first game at the new all-seater Highbury, with Micky Quinn scoring all three goals. Swindon Town's first top division game ends in a 3–1 defeat at Sheffield United. Last season's runners-up Aston Villa head the table with a 4–1 win over QPR. Ipswich Town beat Oldham Athletic 3–0 at Boundary Park. The Division One campaign kicks off with a 5–0 win for Derby County over Sunderland at the Baseball Ground. Middlesbrough begin their quest for an immediate return to the Premier League with a 3–2 win at Notts County. Crystal Palace begin their comeback trail with a goalless draw at home to Tranmere Rovers.

15 August 1993 – Manchester United's defence of the Premier League title begins with a 2–0 away win over Norwich City, last season's third placed side. Nottingham Forest begin their Division One promotion push with a 1–1 draw at Southend United.

17 August 1993 – Sheffield Wednesday pay a club record fee £2.7million for Queens Park Rangers midfielder Andy Sinton.

18 August 1993 - The second round of Premier League fixtures include a 3–0 home win for Manchester United over Sheffield United, in which record signing Roy Keane scores his first two goals from the club. Norwich City win 3–2 over Blackburn Rovers at Ewood Park, 10 months after their found themselves on the receiving end of a 7–1 defeat there. Coventry City beat Newcastle United 2–1 at home, and QPR find themselves on the receiving end of a second successive comprehensive defeat, this time losing 3–1 at home to Liverpool.

19 August 1993 – Tony Barton, who managed Aston Villa to European Cup glory in 1982, dies of a heart attack aged 56.

21 August 1993 – Manchester United are held to a 1–1 home draw with newly promoted Newcastle United, allowing Everton (who beat Sheffield United 4–2, with Tony Cottee scoring a hat-trick) to go top of the Premier League after three games. Ipswich Town go second with a 1–0 home win over Chelsea. Norwich manage an impressive 4–0 win over Leeds at Elland Road. The Division One fixtures include a 5–3 home win for Nottingham Forest over Grimsby Town, Sunderland's 4–0 win over Charlton Athletic at Roker Park, and a 3–0 win over Derby County for Middlesbrough at Ayresome Park.

22 August 1993 - Liverpool go top of the league for the first time since early 1991 with a 5–0 away win over Swindon Town. Southend United, who were contenders for place in the new Premier League two seasons ago, give their promotion dreams for this season a boost with a 4–1 win at Millwall in Division One in one of the first games staged at Millwall's new stadium. A Midlands derby at St Andrew's sees Birmingham City and Wolves draw 2-2.

23 August 1993 – Lee Sharpe scores twice as Manchester United beat last season's runners-up Aston Villa 2–1 at Villa Park, allowing United to go top of the Premier League – they will not be headed all season.

24 August 1993 - Arsenal beat Leeds United 2–1 at Highbury. Blackburn Rovers beat Manchester City 2–0 at Maine Road. A thrilling game at Boundary Park sees Oldham and Coventry battle out a 3–3 draw. Dave Bassett's Sheffield United beat his old club Wimbledon 2–1 at Bramall Lane. Middlesbrough remain top of Division One with a 4–1 win at Barnsley.

25 August 1993 – Swindon Town's dismal Premier League debut continues as they are crushed 5–1 at Southampton.

26 August 1993 – Peter Reid is sacked by Manchester City, who have lost three of their four opening FA Premier League games.

27 August 1993 – Brian Horton leaves Oxford United to become the new manager of Manchester City. He takes charge of his second game later in the day, as the Blues draw 1–1 at home to Coventry City in the Premier League.

28 August 1993 - The Premier League action includes a 2–0 home win over Arsenal over Everton, a 3–1 win at Southampton for Manchester United and a 4–0 away win for QPR over their London rivals West Ham. Crystal Palace boost their bid for an immediate return to the Premier League by beating Portsmouth 5–1. Last season's beaten playoff finalists Leicester City beat Millwall 4–0 at Filbert Street.

29 August 1993 – Alan Shearer scores his first goal for Blackburn Rovers since returning from injury in a 1–1 draw at his hometown club Newcastle United.

31 August 1993 – The first month of the league season ends with defending champions Manchester United top of the Premier League with Liverpool, Arsenal, Norwich City and Ipswich Town completing the top five. Meanwhile, Swindon Town have gained just one point from their first-ever five top division games, and prop up the table. Completing the bottom three are Manchester City and Sheffield Wednesday, who had been largely expected to compete near the top of the table this season. The first month of the Division One campaign has seen Middlesbrough and Charlton Athletic take a joint lead at the top of the table with 12 points. Nottingham Forest, Wolverhampton Wanderers, Southend United and Crystal Palace occupy the playoff places.

1 September 1993 - Manchester United keep up their winning ways a 3–0 home win over West Ham. Sheffield Wednesday are still looking for their first Premier League win six games into the season when they are held to a 3–3 draw at home to Norwich. Coventry hold on to fourth place with a 1–0 home win over Liverpool, who drop one place into third. Manchester City achieve their first win of the season with a 3–1 away win over Swindon, who have picked up one point from their opening six games.

3 September 1993 – Paul Warhurst moves from Sheffield Wednesday to Blackburn Rovers in a £2.75million deal – the fifth highest fee between English clubs.

5 September 1993 - The Black Country derby is contested for the first time in three seasons, with West Bromwich Albion beating Wolves 3–2 at The Hawthorns.

8 September 1993 – England put their World Cup qualification hopes back on track with a 3–0 win over Poland at Wembley.

11 September 1993 – Kevin Campbell scores a hat-trick in Arsenal's 4–0 home league win over Ipswich Town. Eric Cantona's shot from the halfway line at Stamford Bridge hits the crossbar, and a Gavin Peacock goal gives Chelsea a 1–0 win over Manchester United. Down in Division One, Oxford United climb six places from the foot of the table with a spectacular 4–2 home win over Bristol City.

13 September 1993 - Newcastle United beat Sheffield Wednesday 4–2 in the only league action of the day.

14 September 1993 - Tranmere Rovers go top of Division One with a 4–1 home win over bottom club Luton Town.

15 September 1993 – Manchester United beat Honved of Hungary 3–2 away in their first European Cup fixture since 1969.

16 September 1993 – After two months at Portsmouth, Lee Chapman returns to the Premier League with newly promoted West Ham United for £250,000.

17 September 1993 – Liverpool sign West Ham United defender Julian Dicks for £1.5million, with Mike Marsh and David Burrows going to Upton Park in exchange.

19 September 1993 - Manchester United go into their fixture with second placed Arsenal as Premier League leaders on goal difference, but then go ahead by three points with a 1–0 victory at Old Trafford. Nottingham Forest's erratic start to their Division One season continues with a 3–2 home defeat to Stoke City.

21 September 1993 - The first leg of round two in the Football League Cup sees top-flight clubs Oldham Athletic and Sheffield United beaten by Division Two opposition, while Premier League outfit Leeds United lose away at Sunderland from Division One. Elsewhere, Paul Rideout's hat-trick-completing late winner against basement tier club Lincoln City avoids another upset, Division Two side Wrexham draw 3–3 with First Division Nottingham Forest and Ian Wright scores a hat-trick as Arsenal put five past Huddersfield Town without reply.

22 September 1993 – Mark Stein scores twice for Stoke City in their surprise 2–1 over Manchester United in the first leg of the League Cup second round at the Victoria Ground. South African born Stein, 27, is a target for several Premier League clubs.

25 September 1993 – Everton, fourth in the Premier League, suffer a 5–1 defeat at home to Norwich City in one of the most thrilling league games so far this season. Norwich striker Efan Ekoku scores four goals in the game – the first player to score four goals in a Premier League game. Manchester United maintain their lead at the top of the table with a 4–2 home win over Swindon, who are still bottom with no wins and a mere three points from their first nine games. Southampton remain level with Swindon at the bottom of the table with a 1–0 defeat at Arsenal. An East Midlands derby at Meadow Lane sees Notts County beat Derby County 4–1 in Division One.

30 September 1993 – September draws to a close with Manchester United still top of the table, leading by three points over Arsenal. Aston Villa, Leeds United, Norwich City and Wimbledon are just some of the many other clubs currently in strong contention. Liverpool, meanwhile, have slumped to 13th place after a disappointing month, mounting the pressure upon Graeme Souness. Swindon are still bottom of the table and looking for their first-ever top division win after nine games, being level on points with a Southampton side who have lost eight of their first nine games, while Oldham Athletic have fallen into the relegation zone as well. In the race to win promotion to the Premier League, Crystal Palace top Division One on goal difference ahead of Tranmere Rovers. The playoff zone is occupied by Leicester City, Charlton Athletic, Middlesbrough and Southend United.

1 October 1993 – Former Manchester City player-manager Peter Reid signs a short-term playing contract with Southampton, while Everton striker Mo Johnson returns to his homeland after agreeing a contract with Hearts.

2 October 1993 – Gary Speed and Gary McAllister both score twice from midfield in a 4–0 home league win for Leeds United against Wimbledon. Liverpool hold Arsenal to a goalless draw at Anfield, allowing Manchester United to extend their lead of the Premier League after coming from behind twice to beat Sheffield Wednesday 3–2 away from home. Southampton and Sheffield United draw 3–3 at The Dell. Crystal Palace maintain their lead of Division One with a 4–1 home win over Stoke City. Luton Town climb of the bottom of the table in style with a 5–0 home win over Barnsley.

3 October 1993 - Derby County manager Arthur Cox, who had already been under pressure after the club's poor start to the season, resigns due to health problems. His assistant, Roy McFarland replaces him as manager until the end of the season.

4 October 1993 – Jim Holton, who played for Manchester United at centre-half in the 1970s, dies from a heart attack at the wheel of his car. He was 42 years old.

7 October 1993 – Newcastle United manager Kevin Keegan rules him out of the running to take over as England manager if Graham Taylor's reign is ended by failure to qualify for the 1994 FIFA World Cup.

13 October 1993 – England are left with little hope of qualifying for the 1994 World Cup after suffering a 2–0 defeat by the Netherlands in their penultimate qualifying game.

16 October 1993 - Manchester United extend their lead of the Premier League to seven points with a 2–1 home win over Tottenham. Norwich go second with a 2–1 win at Chelsea, while Arsenal drop into third with a goalless draw at home to Manchester City. The big news in Division One is Southend's 6–1 home win over Oxford United, which keeps up their surprise promotion push.

18 October 1993 – Lou Macari walks out on Stoke City to succeed Liam Brady as manager of Glasgow club Celtic.

19 October 1993 - Norwich City become the first English team to beat German giants Bayern Munich on their own soil, winning 2–1 in the UEFA Cup second round first leg.

20 October 1993 - Manchester United surrender a two-goal lead over Turkish champions Galatasaray to draw 3–3 in the European Cup second round first leg at Old Trafford.

23 October 1993 - Manchester United extend their lead of the Premier League to nine points with a 1–0 win over Everton at Goodison Park, with Lee Sharpe scoring the only goal of the game. Their nearest challengers Norwich, Arsenal and Leeds all drop points, while QPR move into fifth place with a 5–1 home win over Coventry. Swindon Town hold Tottenham to a 1–1 draw at White Hart Lane but are still bottom of the table and without a win after 12 games. Charlton Athletic go top of Division One with a 1–0 win over Grimsby Town at Blundell Park. Watford keep up their promotion push with a 4–3 home win over Bolton.

24 October 1993 - Southampton boost their survival push with a 2–1 home win over Newcastle, only their second league win of the season.

26 October 1993 – Blackburn Rovers pay Leeds United £2.75million for midfielder David Batty.

30 October 1993 – 18-year-old Liverpool striker Robbie Fowler scores a hat-trick in a 4–2 home league win over Southampton. Newcastle beat Wimbledon 4–0 at home, and leaders Manchester United now have an 11-point lead after beating QPR 2–1 at Old Trafford, with their nearest rivals Norwich and Arsenal drawing 0–0 at Highbury. An entertaining mid-table game in Division sees Stoke beat Barnsley 5–4 at the Victoria Ground.

31 October 1993 – Manchester United end October as Premier League leaders with an 11-point margin over their nearest rivals Norwich City, Arsenal, Blackburn Rovers and Aston Villa who are all bracketed together on points. Swindon are still bottom of the league and their winless run has now stretched to 13 games, while Southampton and Sheffield Wednesday are still in the relegation zone. Liverpool have improved after last season's wobbles to occupy seventh place. Charlton Athletic are top of Division One, with Leicester City occupying second place. The playoff zone is occupied by Crystal Palace, Tranmere Rovers, Middlesbrough and Derby County. Nottingham Forest and Wolverhampton Wanderers, who both began the season in promotion form, have slipped into the bottom half of the table.

3 November 1993 – Manchester United are eliminated from the European Cup on away goals by Turkish side Galatasaray, while Arsenal progress to the next stage of the European Cup Winners' Cup with a 7–0 away victory over Standard Liège of Belgium.

4-5 November 1993 – 34-year-old goalkeeper Dave Beasant joins Southampton from Chelsea in a £300,000 deal, while the national record fee for a goalkeeper (a record of which Beasant was once a holder) is broken when Tim Flowers exits The Dell from Blackburn Rovers for £2.4million.

6 November 1993 - Sheffield Wednesday climb out of the relegation one with a 4–1 win over Ipswich at Portman Road. Chelsea are on the brink of the relegation zone after losing 4–1 to Leeds at Elland Road. Leicester go top of Division One with a 3–0 home win over Southend.

7 November 1993 – The Manchester derby at Maine Road sees City take a 2–0 lead in the first half with two goals from Niall Quinn, only for Eric Cantona (twice) and Roy Keane to overturn City's lead and win the game 3–2 for United. In Division One, a Steve Bull hat-trick sees Wolves beat Derby at the Baseball Ground and ensure that they remain in the hunt for a playoff place.

17 November 1993 – England beat San Marino 7–1 in their final World Cup qualifying game, but fail to qualify for the finals, as Holland beat Poland. Media reports suggest that manager Graham Taylor is likely to resign or be sacked imminently.

20 November 1993 – Alan Shearer scores both of Blackburn's goals in their 2–0 home league win over his old club Southampton, as his new club close in on the leading pack in the Premier League. Manchester United maintain their 11-point lead of the table by beating Wimbledon 3–1.

21 November 1993 - Andy Cole scores a hat-trick for Newcastle in a 3–0 home win over Liverpool in the Premier League, lifting Kevin Keegan's men into eighth place, displacing their opponents whose promising start to the season has given way to what appears to be another frustrating league campaign.

23 November 1993 - Blackburn climb five places into second place in the Premier League with a 2–1 home win over Coventry.

24 November 1993 – Graham Taylor announces his resignation as England manager after being vilified by the media (notably The Sun newspaper, who branded him a "turnip") for failing to achieve qualification for the 1994 World Cup. On the same day, Swindon Town finally win a Premier League game at the 16th attempt in their first-ever top division campaign, beating Queens Park Rangers 1–0 at home with a goal from Keith Scott. Manchester United now have a 12-point lead at the top of the table despite being held to a goalless draw at home to Ipswich. Newcastle's surge continues as a 4–0 home win over Sheffield United lifts them into fourth place and pushes the visitors into the drop zone.

27 November 1993 – QPR manager Gerry Francis rules himself out of the running to become the next England manager. Manchester City striker Niall Quinn suffers a knee injury against Sheffield Wednesday. Manchester United now have a 14-point lead at the top of the Premier League after beating Coventry 1–0, while Blackburn and Newcastle both drop points.

29 November 1993 – Peter Swales resigns as Manchester City chairman after 20 years. Francis Lee, who had been campaigning for control of the club's board since early in the year, succeeds him.

30 November 1993 – November draws to a close with Manchester United now leading by 14 points ahead of their nearest rivals Leeds United and Arsenal, while newly promoted Newcastle United are starting to give the top five a run for their money. Swindon Town finally managed to win a league game at the 16th attempt, but are still bottom of the division with a mere nine points from their opening 17 games, while Oldham Athletic remain second from bottom and Chelsea have slipped into the relegation zone after Southampton climbed out of it on goal difference. Charlton Athletic remain top of Division One, with Tranmere Rovers occupying second place. Southend United's resurgence in form has seen them rise to third place in the league, with the playoff zone being completed by Crystal Palace, Leicester City and Millwall. Niall Quinn's knee injury is diagnosed as cruciate ligament damage, and he is warned that he is likely to miss the rest of the English league season as well as next summer's World Cup. Jimmy Armfield, the former England international, is selected by The Football Association as the man with the task of finding the national side's next manager.

4 December 1993 – Howard Kendall resigns after three years in his second spell as charge of Everton, who have fallen into the bottom half of the Premier League table after topping it in the first month of the season. Curiously, Kendall's resignation comes within hours of Everton's 1–0 home league win over Southampton. Manchester United and Norwich draw 2–2 in a thrilling match at Old Trafford, while second placed Leeds beat Manchester City 3–2 at Elland Road.

7 December 1993 – Lazio deny rumours that Paul Gascoigne is due to return to English football in a move to either Leeds United or Manchester United.

10 December 1993 – Former England manager Bobby Robson resigns as manager of Portuguese side Sporting Clube de Portugal, sparking media speculation that he will be offered the Everton job.

11 December 1993 - Liverpool are held to a 2–2 at home to bottom club Swindon in the Premier League, although the visitors still have just one league win to their names after 20 matches.

12 December 1993 – Northampton Town, who are bottom of Division Three, dismiss manager Phil Chard and replace him with John Barnwell.

18 December 1993 - The main Premier League action sees Sheffield Wednesday win 5–0 at home over West Ham and Tottenham draw 3–3 at home to Liverpool. Swindon win for the second time in the Premier League this season and for the first time at home by beating Southampton 2–1.

19 December 1993 - With three of the game's four goals coming during the closing few minutes, Manchester United beat Aston Villa 3–1 at Old Trafford to go 13 points ahead at the top of the Premier League.

21 December 1993 - David Rocastle leaves Leeds after 16 months to sign for Manchester City in a £2million, after David White went in the opposite direction for the same fee.

26 December 1993 - The Boxing Day action sees a late equaliser from Paul Ince give Manchester United a 1–1 draw at home to Blackburn after Kevin Gallacher had put the visitors ahead.

27 December 1993 – Kevin Campbell scores his second league hat-trick of the season as Arsenal beat Swindon Town 4–0 at the County Ground. Meanwhile, Arsenal's underperforming North London rivals Tottenham are beaten 3–1 at home by a Norwich City side with two goals coming from prolific 20-year-old striker Chris Sutton. In Division One, Leicester draw 4–4 with Watford in a thrilling match at Filbert Street, and Southend climb back into the top six with a 4–2 home win over fourth-placed Charlton.

29 December 1993 - Manchester United beat Oldham 5–2 at Boundary Park in a match where Andrei Kanchelskis scores twice for the defending champions, who now lead the Premier League by 14 points. Swindon keep up their fight for survival by battling out it for a 3–3 draw at Sheffield Wednesday.

30 December 1993 – Lawrie McMenemy, Southampton manager from 1973 to 1985 and until last month assistant manager of the England team since 1990, returns to The Dell as Director of Football, working alongside under-fire manager Ian Branfoot.

31 December 1993 – The year draws to a close with Manchester United still top of the table with a 14-point lead over nearest rivals Blackburn Rovers, who have a game in hand. Leeds United, Arsenal and Newcastle United complete the top five, while at the other end of the table Swindon Town remain bottom with Oldham Athletic and Chelsea now out of the relegation zone at the expense of Southampton and Sheffield United. Crystal Palace are now leaders of Division One, with the other automatic promotion place currently being occupied by Tranmere Rovers. Charlton Athletic, Leicester City and Southend United complete the top six. Nottingham Forest are catching up with the leading pack and are now just one point and two places outside the playoff zone.

1 January 1994 - The new year begins with Manchester United still 12 points ahead at the top of the Premier League after a goalless draw at home to Leeds. Blackburn narrowly eat in their lead with a 1–0 win at Aston Villa. The key action in Division One includes a 4-2 for Bolton over Notts County at Burnden Park, while Millwall keep up their promotion push with a 3–0 home win over London rivals Crystal Palace and Southend United keep hold of their place in the top six with a 3–1 home win over Birmingham City.

3 January 1994 - Chelsea climb five points clear of the relegation zone with a 4–2 home win over Everton. Derby County keep their push for a playoff place on track with a 4–0 home win over Tranmere Rovers, who lose their place in the top two to Charlton, who win 2–1 at home to West Bromwich Albion.

4 January 1994 – After taking a 3–0 lead in the first half, Manchester United are held to a 3–3 draw by Liverpool in the league at Anfield.

5 January 1994 – It is reported in the media that the former Tottenham Hotspur manager Terry Venables will take over as manager of the England team.

8 January 1994 – The FA Cup third round sparks some major upsets. Bristol City hold Liverpool to a 1–1 draw, while an identical scoreline occurs for Everton at Bolton Wanderers. Queens Park Rangers are defeated by Stockport County, but the big shock comes when Division One Birmingham City lose 2–1 at home to Conference leaders Kidderminster Harriers. Chelsea were surprised to be held 0–0 at Stamford Bridge by Barnet, despite it being Barnet's 'home' tie. Barnet had been struggling at the bottom of the third tier for the entire season, having seen most of their squad and manager leave for Southend United, who they ironically knocked out of the season's League Cup. The match against Chelsea was billed as Hoddle vs Hoddle, as Glenn managed Chelsea, whilst his brother, Carl, had scored a Hoddlesque goal for Barnet versus Crawley Town in the 2nd Round.

11 January 1994 – Ian Branfoot resigns after two and a half years as manager of Southampton, with former England manager Graham Taylor rumoured to be on the shortlist of possible successors. Sheffield Wednesday beat Wimbledon 2–1 in the League Cup quarter-final. Terry Butcher sues Coventry City for £40,000 after his fourteen-month spell as player-manager was ended in January 1992.

12 January 1994 - Manchester United are held to a 2–2 draw in the League Cup quarter-final against Portsmouth at Old Trafford, with Paul Walsh scoring twice for Portsmouth to force a replay. Aston Villa beat Tottenham 2–1 at White Hart Lane in their quarter-final clash.

13 January 1994 – Alex Ferguson sells his son, midfielder Darren Ferguson, from Manchester United to Wolverhampton Wanderers for £250,000.

14 January 1994 – Mike Walker, the manager who took Norwich City to a club best of third place in the Premier League last season, departs Carrow Road to take over at Everton. Norwich announce that Walker's assistant, John Deehan will succeed him as manager with immediate effect, and that the club will be taking legal action against Everton for "tapping up" Walker.

15 January 1994 – Mike Walker starts on a high at Everton, guiding them to a 6–2 home win over Premier League basement club Swindon Town, in which Tony Cottee scores his second league hat-trick of the season. Aston Villa beat West Ham 3–1 at Villa Park and Liverpool win 3–0 at Oldham. In Division One, a relegation crunch game at Vicarage Road sees Watford beat Birmingham 5–2, with Paul Furlong scoring a hat-trick.

20 January 1994 –

  - – Legendary former Manchester United manager Sir Matt Busby dies at the age of 84.
    - – Alan Ball is appointed manager of Southampton, who pay £100,000 to release him from his contract as manager of Exeter City.
      - – Colin Harvey, who has been at Everton since joining them as a player 30 years ago, leaves the Goodison Park club. He had worked under Howard Kendall as a coach during his two spells as manager, and was also manager of the club from June 1987 to October 1990 between Kendall's two spells.

22 January 1994 - Manchester United beat Everton 1–0 at Old Trafford with a goal from Ryan Giggs in their first match since the death of Sir Matt Busby. The Steel City derby at Hillsborough sees Sheffield Wednesday beat Sheffield United 3–1.

24 January 1994 - A match at Upton Park sees West Ham draw 3–3 with Norwich, who have scored 32 goals on their travels in the Premier League this season but just eight times at home.

25 January 1994 - A Brian Tinnion goal gives Bristol City a 1–0 win over Liverpool in the FA Cup third round replay.

26 January 1994 - Manchester United reach the League Cup semi-finals for the third time in four seasons by beating Portsmouth 1–0 in the Fratton Park quarter-final replay.

28 January 1994 –

  - – The Football Association's two-month search for a successor to Graham Taylor ends with the appointment of Terry Venables.
    - – Graeme Souness quits as Liverpool manager after their shock FA Cup exit at the hands of Bristol City. He is succeeded by long-serving coach Roy Evans. Neighbouring Everton are also reeling from a third round replay exit in the FA Cup at the hands of a much smaller club, in their case Bolton Wanderers.

29 January 1994 – Kidderminster Harriers claim another Football League scalp when they triumph 1–0 at home to Preston North End in the FA Cup fourth round. Other surprise results include Manchester City's 1–0 defeat to Division Two strugglers Cardiff City. Tranmere reach the League Cup semi-finals for the first time ever by beating Nottingham Forest 2–0 in the quarter-final replay at Prenton Park.

30 January 1994 - Manchester United keep their treble bid on track with a 2–0 win at Norwich in the FA Cup fourth round.

31 January 1994 – Manchester United finish January as leaders with a 16-point margin, though Blackburn Rovers in second place have three games in hand. Arsenal, Newcastle United and a resurgent Liverpool side undaunted by the FA Cup shock and change of manager complete the top five. Swindon Town remain bottom, while Oldham Athletic occupy the next lowest position, though Sheffield United have climbed out of the relegation zone at the expense of Manchester City. In Division One, Crystal Palace and Charlton Athletic lead the race for promotion to the Premier League. The playoff zone is occupied by Millwall, Leicester City, Tranmere Rovers and Nottingham Forest. Wolverhampton Wanderers are on the comeback trail after a run of dismal form before Christmas, and are now just two points and two places outside the playoff zone.

2 February 1994 – Newcastle United pay a club record £2.5million for Norwich City winger Ruel Fox.

5 February 1994 – Having scored only one league goal all season before now, Norwegian striker Jan Age Fjortoft scores a hat-trick for Swindon Town (still bottom of the Premier League) in their 3–1 home win over Coventry City.

6 February 1994 - Middlesbrough arrest their slide down Division One with a 4–2 win over Millwall at Ayresome Park, denying the visitors the chance of going second in the league. An East Midlands derby at the City Ground sees Nottingham Forest beat Leicester 4–0.

9 February 1994 – The FA Cup fourth round replays witness some of the most surprising results ever seen in the competition. Holders Arsenal lose 3–1 at home to Division One underdogs Bolton Wanderers. Leeds United, chasing a UEFA Cup place in the Premier League, lose 3–2 at home to an Oxford United side who are battling against relegation to Division Two. Newcastle United, another team in the race for a European place, lose 2–0 at another Division One struggling side – Luton Town. This means that a mere seven of the 16 clubs in the FA Cup fifth round will be Premier League members.

12 February 1994 – Dean Saunders scores a hat-trick for Aston Villa in their 5–0 home league win over Swindon Town. Wimbledon beat Newcastle United 4–2 at Selhurst Park.

13 February 1994 - A spectacular goal from Ryan Giggs gives Manchester United a 1–0 lead over Sheffield Wednesday in their League Cup semi-final first leg at Old Trafford.

14 February 1994 – Matthew Le Tissier scores a hat-trick for Southampton in their 4–2 home league win over Liverpool.

16 February 1994 – Tranmere Rovers, who have never played in an FA Cup or Football League Cup final, move closer to their Wembley dream with a 3–1 win over Aston Villa in the first leg of the League Cup semi-final.

17 February 1994 – In the wake of a two-month winless run, Ipswich Town announce that John Lyall will be returning as team manager, and that Mick McGiven will revert to his previous job as assistant manager.

19 February 1994 –

  - – Aston Villa's hopes of achieving a cup double are ended when they are beaten 1–0 by Bolton Wanderers at Burnden Park in the FA Cup fifth round. Kidderminster Harriers, among the few non-league teams ever to reach this stage of the competition, have their dream ended in a 1–0 defeat by West Ham United.
    - – Jan Age Fjortoft's goalscoring surge continues as he scores twice in the league for Swindon against Norwich City, but the East Anglians still hold out for a 3–3 draw at the County Ground. Coventry beat Manchester City 4–0 at Highfield Road. Derby County climb into the Division One playoff zone with a 4–3 win at Watford.

20 February 1994 - Cardiff City's FA Cup ends with a 2–1 home defeat to Luton Town in the fifth round. Bolton knock out Aston Villa with a 1–0 win at Burnden Park. Manchester United travel to Selhurst Park to take on Wimbledon and win 3–0.

22 February 1994 - Sheffield United's survival hopes are hit by a 3–2 defeat Ipswich. Manchester City climb out of the bottom three on goal difference with a goalless draw at Aston Villa. Blackburn are now six points behind Manchester United after a 2–2 draw at Norwich.

23 February 1994 – Andy Cole scores a hat-trick for Newcastle in a 4–0 home win over Coventry City.

26 February 1994 - An epic Premier League clash at Upton Park sees Mark Hughes give Manchester United an early lead over West Ham, before the hosts go ahead with goals from Lee Chapman and Trevor Morley, until Paul Ince scores a late equaliser against his old club to make it a 2–2 draw. West Bromwich Albion complete the "double" over their local rivals Wolves with a 2–1 win at the Molineux, which boosts their survival bid and dents the playoff challenge of their rivals, mounting the pressure on long-serving manager Graham Turner.

27 February 1994 - Aston Villa reach a domestic cup final for the first time in 17 years after clawing back a two-goal deficit to beat Tranmere 3-1 and win the penalty shootout at Villa Park. In the Premier League, Chelsea boost their survival push with a 4–3 home win over Tottenham.

28 February 1994 – February draws to a close with Manchester United still top, though with their lead now cut to seven points, and they have a game in hand over second-placed Blackburn Rovers. Arsenal, Newcastle United and Liverpool complete an unchanged top five at this month end. At the other end of the table, Oldham Athletic and Swindon Town prop up the rest of the Premier League while Manchester City have climbed out of the bottom three at the expense of Sheffield United. Crystal Palace remain top of Division One, with Charlton Athletic second in the table. The playoff zone is occupied by Leicester City, Derby County, Millwall and a Stoke City side who have prospered under new manager Joe Jordan since the departure of Lou Macari to Celtic in October and mounted a serious challenge for a second successive promotion.

2 March 1994 – Manchester City sign German striker Uwe Rosler from Dynamo Dresden for £750,000. Manchester United reach their third League Cup final in four seasons with a 4–1 win at Sheffield Wednesday in the semi-final second leg. Charlton and Wolves both reach the FA Cup quarter-finals.

5 March 1994 – Arsenal heap misery upon Ipswich Town, this time with a 5–1 league win at Portman Road in which Ian Wright scores a hat-trick. Meanwhile, Manchester United suffer their first home league defeat since October 1992 when they lose 1–0 to Chelsea at Old Trafford.

6 March 1994 - Aston Villa climb into fifth place with a 1–0 win at Coventry.

7 March 1994 – New England manager Terry Venables announces that David Platt, who currently plays for Sampdoria of Italy, will be the captain of the national team.

9 March 1994 – England beat Denmark 1–0 in a friendly at Wembley in their first game under Terry Venables.

10 March 1994 – Division One leaders Crystal Palace prepare for their inevitable return to the Premier League with a £1.1million move for Watford striker Bruce Dyer.

12 March 1994 – The biggest win of the Premier League season so far sees Newcastle United beat Swindon Town 7–1 at St James's Park. Peter Beardsley, Rob Lee and Steve Watson all find the net twice, with Ruel Fox also scoring. The consolation goal comes from John Moncur. QPR beat Norwich 4–3 in a thrilling match at Carrow Road. In the FA Cup, Peter Schmeichel is sent off for handling the ball outside the penalty area but Manchester United still beat Charlton 3–1 in the Old Trafford quarter-final. Bolton's FA Cup run ends with a 1–0 defeat at home to Oldham.

13 March 1994 - Liverpool beat Everton 2–1 in the last Merseyside derby at Anfield before the Spion Kop is rebuilt.

16 March 1994 - Midweek drama in the Premier League sees Manchester United return to their winning ways with a 5–0 home win over Sheffield Wednesday, which gives them a seven-point lead over Blackburn with 11 games remaining.

19 March 1994 – Eric Cantona is sent off for stamping on John Moncur in Manchester United's 2–2 league draw with Swindon Town at the County Ground. Ian Wright scores a second successive Premier League hat-trick for Arsenal in a 4–0 win at Southampton. Newcastle win 4–2 at West Ham. Nottingham Forest's surge in Division One continues with a 3–2 win over Bolton which puts them just two points behind leaders Crystal Palace.

22 March 1994 – Three days after being sent off against Swindon, Eric Cantona is sent off again – also in a 2–2 draw, this time in the league against Arsenal at Highbury. Lee Sharpe scores both of United's goals.

23 March 1994 - Luton Town reach the FA Cup semi-final when a Scott Oakes hat-trick gives them a 3–2 win over West Ham in the quarter-final replay at Kenilworth Road.

24 March 1994 – Manchester City sign Everton winger Peter Beagrie for £1.1million. He is succeeded at Goodison Park by Arsenal's Anders Limpar for £1.6million. Tottenham Hotspur's quest to sign a new striker in an attempt to stave off relegation ends in failure when West Ham's Clive Allen signs for Division One promotion chasers Millwall for £75,000, ending talk his return to Tottenham, who also fail to lure Frenchman Jean-Pierre Papin from Bayern Munich. Steve Morrow is reportedly set for a new Arsenal contract after a proposed move to a Swindon Town side heading for relegation is called off. Another player going nowhere is QPR striker Les Ferdinand, who has been subject to transfer speculation for months. Joining Anders Limpar at Goodison Park is 20-year-old AFC Bournemouth midfielder Joe Parkinson, a hot prospect costing £250,000. Leicester City boost their promotion challenge with a £360,000 move for Portsmouth midfielder Mark Blake. Wimbledon sign Brentford striker Marcus Gayle for £250,000. Loan moves include Jeroen Boere (West Ham United to Portsmouth), Ian Kilford (Nottingham Forest to Wigan Athletic), Tom Cowan (Sheffield United to Huddersfield Town), Scott Marshall and Jimmy Carter (both Arsenal to Oxford United) and Paul Dickov (Arsenal to Brighton & Hove Albion).

26 March 1994 – Fulham manager Don Mackay is sacked at half-time by chairman Jimmy Hill, with the team losing 2–0 to fellow strugglers Leyton Orient. Former manager Ray Lewington is put in charge again for the second half, during which the Cottagers score twice and salvage a 2–2 draw. In the Premier League, Blackburn cut Manchester United's lead to three points with a 3–1 home win over Swindon. In Division One, Notts County home in on the playoff places with a 3–1 home win over East Midlands rivals Leicester.

27 March 1994 – Manchester United's bid for a unique domestic treble ends when they lost 3–1 to Aston Villa in the 1994 Football League Cup Final.

28 March 1994 - Sheffield United boost their survival bid with a 3–2 home win over West Ham.

29 March 1994 – Blackburn's hopes of catching Manchester United in the title race are dealt a major blow when they lose 4–1 away to Wimbledon. Andy Cole becomes the first player to reach the 30-goal mark in the Premier League when he scores in Newcastle's 3–0 home win over Norwich City.

30 March 1994 - Manchester United extend their lead of the Premier League to six points with a 1–0 win over Liverpool, in which Paul Ince scores the only goal. Oldham climb out of the bottom three with a 3–1 win at Southampton, who take their place in the relegation zone.

31 March 1994 – Manchester United's treble bid may be over, but they finish March as Premier League leaders by a six-point lead over their nearest rivals Blackburn Rovers. They are also in the FA Cup semi-finals. Newcastle United, Arsenal and Leeds United complete the top five. Oldham Athletic, who will soon be competing in the FA Cup semi-final with Manchester United, are starting to look set for Premier League survival as they have climbed out of the relegation zone at the expense of Southampton, while Sheffield United and Swindon Town remain there. In Division One, Crystal Palace continue to head the table and have been joined in the automatic promotion places by a Nottingham Forest side who weren't even in the playoff zone a month ago. Leicester City, Millwall, Derby County and Tranmere Rovers occupy the playoff zone.

2 April 1994 – Blackburn Rovers cut Manchester United's lead at the top of the Premier League to two points after beating them 2–0 at Ewood Park, three months after United had established a 16-point lead. Alan Shearer scores both of Blackburn's goals. In the relegation battle, Oldham Athletic give themselves a fresh boost by beating QPR 4–1 at Boundary Park, while Everton's relegation woes deepen when they lose 5–1 to Sheffield Wednesday at Hillsborough.

4 April 1994 – Everton are pushed further into the relegation mire with a 3–0 home defeat by Blackburn Rovers, who are kept off the top by Manchester United's 3–2 home win over Oldham Athletic. Tottenham Hotspur are still in danger of relegation after suffering a 4–1 home defeat to West Ham United. Leeds beat QPR 4–0 at Loftus Road.

5 April 1994 - A thrilling East Midlands derby at Filbert Street sees Leicester and Derby draw 3-3 in the Division One promotion race. At the opposite end of the table, Watford win 4–3 at Peterborough.

9 April 1994 – Chelsea beat Luton Town 2–0 in the FA Cup semi-final to reach their first FA Cup final since 1970. In the league, the drama of the day comes as Southampton boost their survival bid with a dramatic 5–4 win over Norwich City at Carrow Road. Matt Le Tissier scores a hat-trick for the Saints, while Chris Sutton scores twice for the Canaries. Everton, meanwhile, give their own survival bid a boost with a 1–0 away win over West Ham United, with Tony Cottee scoring against his old club.

10 April 1994 – A late equaliser by Mark Hughes forces a replay for Manchester United as they draw 1–1 with Oldham Athletic in the FA Cup semi-final, on the same day that Eric Cantona (suspended for today's game) is voted PFA Player of the Year – the first foreign player to receive this accolade.

11 April 1994 – Alan Shearer scores his 30th league goal of the season in Blackburn's 1–0 home league win over Aston Villa to put Blackburn level on points with Manchester United, three months after 16 points separated the two teams.

12 April 1994 - Arsenal reach the final of the European Cup Winners' Cup with a 2-1 aggregate win over Paris St Germain.

13 April 1994 – Manchester United beat Oldham Athletic 4–1 in the FA Cup semi-final replay at Maine Road.

16 April 1994 - Wimbledon beat Manchester United 1–0 in the Premier League but Blackburn miss the chance to go top by losing 3–1 at Southampton, a result which is a big boost for Alan Ball's men in their bid for survival. In Division One, Crystal Palace make promotion almost certain with a 1–0 win at Luton.

17 April 1994 - Crystal Palace's promotion is confirmed when Millwall - one of two teams who were still capable of finishing above them - draw 2–2 at home to second placed Nottingham Forest.

20 April 1994 – The Football League confirms that no team will be relegated to the GM Vauxhall Conference this year, as none of the teams in the top half of the Conference (which, curiously, includes former League members Southport) have a ground which meets the criteria for admission to the League. The recent requirement that all clubs must have a stadium holding at least 6,000 fans (1,200 or more seated) and must own their own stadium is the result of the collapse of Maidstone United at the start of last season; they had won promotion to the Football League in 1989 but had no home of their own at the time and went on to spend a large sum of money on purchasing a piece of land with the intention of building a stadium there, only to be refused planning permission to build the stadium. This leaves Northampton Town and Darlington, who are both well adrift at the bottom of Division Three, fighting only the dishonour of placing as the League's bottom club. Northampton are in the process of building a new stadium to replace the County Ground later this year.

23 April 1994 – Eric Cantona returns from his five-match ban in style by scoring both of Manchester United's goals in the Manchester derby at Old Trafford, which United win 2–0, going three points ahead of Blackburn with four games remaining. Swindon's relegation is confirmed with a 4–2 home defeat to Wimbledon. Ipswich are still in danger of going down after losing 5–0 at Sheffield Wednesday. Oldham miss an opportunity to climb back out of the relegation zone by losing 3–2 at Newcastle.

24 April 1994 - Blackburn are held to a 1–1 draw at home by QPR, denting their title bid just as Manchester United look to be recapturing their form.

26 April 1994 – A Dean Holdsworth hat-trick gives Wimbledon a 3–0 home league win over Oldham Athletic, who fall further into relegation trouble.

27 April 1994 - Newcastle move closer to a UEFA Cup place by beating Aston Villa 5–1, and Manchester United move closer to the title with a 2–0 win at Leeds, placing them potentially four days away from winning the title. Blackburn keep their title hopes alive with a 2–1 win at West Ham. Nottingham Forest are on the brink of joining Crystal Palace for an immediate return to the Premier League with a 2–0 win at Derby leaving them needing just two points from their final three games to be sure of promotion.

30 April 1994 – April draws to a close with Manchester United still top of the league, though leading by just two points with a game in hand over Blackburn Rovers, the only team who now stand a mathematical chance of catching them. Newcastle United, Arsenal and Leeds United complete the top five, which a resurgent Wimbledon would now be in had it not been for their weaker form earlier on in the season. Swindon Town, meanwhile, have had their relegation confirmed as they occupy bottom place with a mere 27 points and just four wins so far this season, although they did record a first away win in the top flight today by beating QPR 3–1 at Loftus Road. Oldham Athletic and Sheffield United complete the bottom three, while Southampton, Everton, Ipswich Town, Tottenham Hotspur and Manchester City are still under threat of relegation. Crystal Palace and Nottingham Forest will be playing Premier League football next season after sealing promotion from Division One, a year after relegation. The playoff zone is occupied by Tranmere Rovers, Leicester City, Derby County and Millwall, but there is still a chance of Notts County or Wolverhampton Wanderers ousting Millwall from the playoff places. The last game is played in front of Liverpool's Spion Kop before it is rebuilt as an all-seater stand. Nottingham Forest's promotion was secured today with a 3–2 win at doomed Peterborough.

1 May 1994 – Manchester United move to the brink of a back-to-back FA Premier League title triumph after winning 2–1 at relegation-threatened Ipswich Town, with Eric Cantona and Ryan Giggs both scoring the net after Chris Kiwomya gave the hosts an early lead. Down in Division One, Lennie Lawrence resigns as manager of Middlesbrough after the Ayresome Park side missed out on the playoffs and the chance of an immediate return to the Premier League. Former player Graeme Souness is one of the names quickly linked to the Middlesbrough manager's job, as are the likes of Bryan Robson, Brian Little, Gordon Strachan and Steve Coppell.

2 May 1994 - Blackburn's 2–1 defeat at Coventry gives the Premier League title to Manchester United for a second successive season.

4 May 1994 – Arsenal win the European Cup Winners' Cup by beating Parma 1–0. The only goal in the Final comes from Alan Smith, who has missed most of this season due to injuries.

7 May 1994 – On the final weekend of the Premier League season, Oldham go in to their final game at Norwich needing a win to stand any chance of survival, but a 1–1 draw at Carrow Road is not enough to save them and they go down after three seasons in the top flight. Already-relegated Swindon lose 5–0 at home to Leeds, meaning that they become the first top flight team in 30 years to finish a league campaign with 100 goals conceded. Everton perform a miracle escape from relegation by beating Wimbledon 3-2 after going two goals down in the first half at Goodison Park. Sheffield United would have stayed up goal difference had they not conceded a last time goal at Stamford Bridge which gave Chelsea 3–2 win and enabled Ipswich Town to survive by a single point after drawing 0–0 with league runners-up Blackburn at Ewood Park. Newcastle secure a UEFA Cup place for the first time in 17 years by finishing third.

8 May 1994 - The last Premier League game of the season sees Manchester United draw 0–0 at home to Coventry and receive the Premier League trophy.

14 May 1994 – Manchester United complete the 'double' by beating Chelsea 4–0 in the 1994 FA Cup Final. The deadlock had yet to be broken at half time, before Eric Cantona converted two penalties, Mark Hughes scored United's third goal (his sixth cup final goal in five seasons) and substitute Brian McClair completed the scoring just before the final whistle. United's status as league champions means that Chelsea will enter the European Cup Winners' Cup next season, their first venture into European competition for more than 20 years.

18 May 1994 - Bryan Robson calls time on 13 years and nearly 500 appearances for Manchester United to become player-manager of Middlesbrough.

20 May 1994 – QPR give a free transfer to 37-year-old midfielder Ray Wilkins, the veteran midfielder who played 84 times for England between 1978 and 1986. Middlesbrough announce the appointment of Bryan Robson as player-manager, ending the 37-year-old Manchester United captain's 13-year spell at Manchester United.

24 May 1994 – Matt Le Tissier, who has been linked with a move to several big clubs including Manchester United, signs a new contract to stay at Southampton until at least 1997.

26 May 1994 – Ray Wilkins becomes player-coach of newly promoted Crystal Palace.

28 May 1994 - Wycombe Wanderers win the Division Three playoffs at the end of their first season as a Football League club, defeating Preston North End 4-2 at Wembley.

29 May 1994 - Burnley beat Stockport County 2-1 in the Division Two playoff final, ending their 11-year spell in the lower two tiers of the English league, and condemning Stockport to their fourth Wembley defeat in three seasons.

30 May 1994 - Leicester City beat their East Midlands rivals Derby County 2-1 in the Division One playoff final to end their seven-year absence from the top flight, as well as winning at Wembley for the first time after seven attempts (four FA Cup final defeats and most recently back-to-back playoff final defeats).

31 May 1994 - Arsenal sign Swedish midfielder Stefan Schwarz from SL Benfica for £1.75million.

1 June 1994 - Liverpool goalkeeper Bruce Grobbelaar leaves Anfield after 13 years to sign for Southampton on a free transfer. The club's longest serving player Ronnie Whelan leaves Anfield on a free transfer after 15 years.

10 June 1994 – Bobby Charlton, record goalscorer for both Manchester United and England, receives a knighthood.

14 June 1994 – Tottenham Hotspur are found guilty of financial irregularities and receive the heaviest punishment ever imposed on an English club. The Football Association fines Tottenham £600,000, bans them from the 1994–95 FA Cup, and deducts them 12 league points from the start of next season.

18 June 1994 - With England, Scotland, Wales and Northern Ireland all having failed to qualify for the World Cup, a mostly English based Republic of Ireland national side pull off a major shock in first group stage game of the tournament in the USA when a goal from Aston Villa winger Ray Houghton gives the Irishmen a 1-0 win over Italy in East Rutherford. The Republic are still managed by England's 1966 World Cup winning centre-half Jack Charlton, who has been in charge for eight years.

22 June 1994 – West Ham United sign Oxford United winger Joey Beauchamp for £1million.

24 June 1994 - Manchester City sign winger Nicky Summerbee from Swindon Town for £1.5million. The Republic of Ireland's second World Cup group game ends in a 2-1 defeat to Mexico in Orlando, with the only goal coming from 35-year-old Tranmere Rovers striker John Aldridge.

28 June 1994 - The Republic of Ireland national side go through to the last 16 of the World Cup after holding Norway (also with a number of English based players) to a goalless draw in East Rutherford.

4 July 1994 - The Republic of Ireland's World Cup dream ends with a 2-0 defeat to Holland in the Orlando last 16 clash. The only English based player still active in the World Cup is Bulgarian striker Boncho Genchev of Ipswich Town.

13 July 1994 - Bulgaria are beaten 2-1 by Italy in the World Cup semi-finals, ending the representation of English based players at the World Cup.

== Women's football ==
=== Women's National League ===
==== Premier Division ====
Pos	Team	Pld	W	D	L	GF	GA	GD	Pts	Qualification or relegation
1	Doncaster Belles (C)	18	16	1	1	110	16	+94	49	
2	Arsenal	18	14	3	1	85	15	+70	45	
3	Knowsley United	18	13	2	3	62	30	+32	41	
4	Wembley	18	9	2	7	33	33	0	29	
5	Millwall Lionesses	18	8	2	8	38	46	−8	26	
6	Stanton Rangers	18	6	6	6	32	34	−2	24	
7	Leasowe Pacific	18	7	2	9	42	48	−6	23	
8	Red Star Southampton (Note: Red Star Southampton and Wimbledon deducted three points for failing to fulfil a fixture.)	18	2	3	13	25	70	−45	6	
9	Ipswich Town (R)	18	1	3	14	14	86	−72	6	Relegation to Northern Division
10	Wimbledon (R)	18	2	0	16	15	78	−63	3	Relegation to Southern Division

Source: WFA NL
(C) Champions; (R) Relegated

==== Division One North ====
Pos	Team	Pld	W	D	L	GF	GA	GD	Pts	Promotion or relegation
1	Wolverhampton Wanderers (C, P)	18	12	4	2	61	28	+33	40	Promotion to the National Division
2	Sheffield Wednesday	18	13	1	4	46	20	+26	40	
3	Abbeydale Alvechurch	18	9	2	7	38	31	+7	29	
4	Bronte	18	8	4	6	46	26	+20	28	
5	Cowgate Kestrels	18	9	1	8	38	41	−3	28	
6	Villa Aztecs	18	8	3	7	37	34	+3	27	
7	St Helens	18	7	1	10	36	57	−21	22	
8	Langford	18	5	2	11	25	41	−16	17	
9	Nottingham Argyle	18	5	1	12	25	49	−24	16	
10	Kidderminster Harriers (O)	18	3	3	12	24	49	−25	12	Qualification for the relegation playoff

Source: WFA NL
(C) Champions; (O) Play-off winners; (P) Promoted

==== Division One South ====
Pos	Team	Pld	W	D	L	GF	GA	GD	Pts	Promotion or relegation
1	Bromley Borough (C, P)	18	14	3	1	68	16	+52	45	Promotion to the National Division
2	Town & County	18	11	2	5	51	29	+22	35	
3	Bristol	18	11	1	6	50	34	+16	34	Resigned from the league after the end of the season
4	Epsom & Ewell	18	10	2	6	37	26	+11	32	Resigned from the league after the end of the season
5	Brighton & Hove Albion	18	9	4	5	36	23	+13	31	
6	Maidstone Tigresses	18	8	5	5	37	28	+9	29	
7	Hemel Hempstead	18	4	6	8	33	44	−11	18	
8	Horsham	18	4	4	10	24	33	−9	16	
9	Oxford United	18	3	4	11	17	37	−20	13	
10	Hassocks (R)	18	0	1	17	7	90	−83	1	Relegation

Source: WFA NL
(C) Champions; (P) Promoted; (R) Relegated

=== FA Women's Cup ===
==== Final ====
24 April 1994

Doncaster Belles	1–0	Knowsley United
Walker 38'	Report

Glanford Park, Scunthorpe
Attendance: 1,674
Referee: Ian Hemley (Ampthill)

== Deaths ==
- 20 August 1993 – Tony Barton, 56, was manager of Aston Villa when they won the European Cup in 1982. Had taken over from Ron Saunders earlier during the 1981–82 season. He remained in charge for two more seasons at Villa Park and later in his career he managed Northampton Town as well as being assistant manager of Portsmouth and finally Southampton before retiring from football in 1991.
- 5 October 1993 - Jim Holton, 41, was centre-half in Manchester United's Second Division title winning side of 1975, having signed from Shrewsbury Town in 1972. Later played for Sunderland and finally Coventry City before his career was ended by injury at the age of 29, after which he worked as a pub landlord in Coventry.
- 5 November 1993 - Arthur Rowe, 87, played more than 200 games for Tottenham Hotspur in the interwar years, becoming manager in 1949 and taking them to promotion in his first season in charge, securing the club's first top division title a year later. At the time no other club had won the top division title a year after promotion. Remained in charge at White Hart Lane until 1955. Later managed Crystal Palace.
- 4 December 1993 - Roy Vernon, 56, scored 101 goals in 176 league games for Everton between 1960 and 1965, helping them win the league title in 1963 after signing from Blackburn Rovers. Also won 32 caps for Wales, scoring eight goals.
- 7 December 1993 - John Simpson, 60, was Gillingham's first choice goalkeeper for most of his 15-year spell at the club, making a club record 571 league appearances between 1957 and 1972.
- 9 December 1993 – Danny Blanchflower, 67, was wing-half and captain of Tottenham Hotspur when they won the double in 1961, F.A Cup in 1962 and Cup Winners Cup in 1963. He retired through injury in 1964. During the late 1970s he managed Chelsea but was unable to sustain himself as a successful football manager, although he did make a successful living.
- 12 January 1994 - Arthur Turner, 84, played 358 league games as a centre-half in a career which took him from Stoke City to Birmingham City and finally to Southport between 1930 and 1948, being disrupted by World War II. As a manager, he took Birmingham City to runners-up spot in the FA Cup in 1956 and Oxford United into the Football League in 1962, remaining there until 1969, by which time they were in the Second Division.
- 20 January 1994 – Sir Matt Busby, 84, won F.A Cup as player with Manchester City in 1934. Became one of the most famous names in world football when manager of Manchester United from 1945 to 1969. Built three great teams. The first great team made its name in the postwar years with an F.A Cup victory and a league title. Busby replaced the ageing members of this teams with exciting young players who were known as the 'Busby Babes'. They won two straight league titles before eight players died and two had their careers ended by the Munich Air Disaster in 1958. Busby himself was gravely injured but made a full recovery against all the odds. He then built a third great team for the 1960s which won an F.A Cup and two league titles before reaching its pinnacle with the European Cup in 1968. He retired a year later but remained as a director and later as president until his death, which marked the end of his association with the club which had lasted 49 years.
- 21 January 1994 – Tony Waddington, 68, was manager of Stoke City from 1960 to 1977 and guided them to League Cup glory in 1972 – still their only major trophy to date.
- 7 February 1994 - Billy Briscoe, 97, one of the oldest surviving players to have appeared in the Football League, was with Port Vale when they joined the league in 1919 and played 307 league games for them leading up to 1931, scoring 51 goals.
- 19 February 1994 - Johnny Hancocks, 74, scored 158 goals in 343 league games for Wolverhampton Wanderers as a right-winger between 1946 and 1957, helping them win the FA Cup in 1949 and league title in 1954. Won three England caps and scored twice, being denied more caps by the fact that his career coincided with that of Stanley Matthews.
- 14 April 1994 - Bobby Gurney, 86, spent his entire professional career at Sunderland from 1925 to 1950, playing 388 league games and scoring a club record 228 goals and collecting a league title medal in 1935 and an FA Cup winner's medal in 1937. He played for the Wearside club, having joined them at 18, until his 43rd year, and then switched to management to take charge of Peterborough United, Darlington and finally Hartlepool United. Was capped for England once in 1935.
- 7 May 1994 - Andy McEvoy, 55, played 183 league games for Blackburn Rovers between 1956 and 1967, scoring 89 goals. He was capped 17 times for the Republic of Ireland, scoring six goals, and later returned to his homeland to play for Limerick and later manage Bray Wanderers.
- 19 May 1994 - John Malkin, 72, succeeded Stanley Matthews on the right wing for Stoke City in 1946, and played 175 league games for the club before injury ended his playing career in 1956.
- 15 June 1994 - Gerry Mannion, 54, played 17 league appearances as a right-winger for Wolverhampton Wanderers between 1957 and 1961, including the final 10 games of the 1959-60 season, when Wolves were pipped to the title by Burnley. Then played for Norwich City, scoring in both legs of their 1962 League Cup final triumph.
