= 1993–94 FA Women's Cup =

Tournament details
- Country: England & Wales

Final positions
- Champions: Doncaster Belles
- Runners-up: Knowsley United
- Penalty shoot-outs do not count towards the total number of goals.

The 1993–94 FA Women's Cup was an association football knockout tournament for women's teams, held between 19 September 1993 and 24 April 1994. It was the 24th season of the FA Women's Cup and was won by Doncaster Belles, who defeated Knowsley United in the final.

The tournament consisted eight rounds of competition proper.

All match results and dates from the Women's FA Cup Website.

== First round proper ==
All games were scheduled for 19 September 1993.

Tie	Home team (tier)	Score	Away team (tier)	Att.
1	Ashington East North	0–5	Newcastle	
2	Bangor City	0–5	Preston Rangers	
3	Barnsley	2–3	Cleveland	
4	Bournemouth	3–2	Aylesbury United	
5	Bradford City	11–1	Sheffield Hallam United	
6	Broadoak	12–1	Bolton	
7	Bury	6–4	Warrington Town	
8	Carterton	0–3	Havant	
9	Cheltenham YMCA	3–3 (a.e.t.)	Truro City	
replay	Truro City	4–4 (2–0 p)	Cheltenham YMCA	
10	City Roses	3–0	Wiggington Grasshoppers	
11	Colchester United	0–5	Pye	
12	Collier Row	3–0	Enfield	
13	Crowborough Athletic	2–5	Palace Eagles	
14	Dunstable	9–0	Stevenage Town	
15	Edenbridge Town	0–4	SE Rangers	
16	Farnborough	0–1 (a.e.t.)	Launton	
17	Gillingham	2–17	Brentford	
18	Haslingden	2–0	Vernon–Carus	
19	Huddersfield Town	22–0	Grimsby	
20	Inter Cardiff	2–1	Frome	
21	Isle of Wight	0–9	Binfield	
22	Lambeth	5–3	Barnet	
23	Leicester City	3–2	Highfield Rangers	
24	Leyton Orient	23–0	Tonbridge Angels	
25	Manchester City	2–0	Manchester United	

Tie	Home team (tier)	Score	Away team (tier)	Att.
26	Nettleham	1–3	Derby County	
27	Nottingham Forest	1–9	Birmingham City	
28	Oldham Athletic	3–4	Manchester Belle Vue	
29	Pagham	1–9	Corematch	
30	Plymouth Pilgrims	2–0	Clevedon Town	
31	Portsmouth	1–2	Gosport Borough	
32	Reading Royals	0–1	Newbury	
33	Rugby	1–7	Rainworth Miners Welfare	
34	Runcorn	1–7	Newsham	
35	St Germaine	2–0	Peterborough Pythons	
36	Sutton Athletic	1–2	Abbey Rangers	
37	Swansea	4–6 (a.e.t.)	Bristol City	
38	TNT	3–1	Derby City	
39	Tongwynlais	2–1	Swindon Spitfires	
40	Tottenham Hotspur	4–0	Chislehurst	
41	Tranmere Rovers	8–2	Rd. Stockport	
42	Wakefield	10–3	Brighouse	
43	Walton & Hersham	4–0	Teynham Gunners	
44	Welwyn Garden City	1–10	Colchester Royals	
45	Whitehawk	17–0	Reading	
46	Wigan	10–0	Liverpool Feds	
47	Winchester All Stars	0–7	Charlton	
48	Worcester City	16–0	Stratford	
49	Yate Town	3–0	Cardiff Institute	

== Second round proper ==
All games were originally scheduled for 17 October 1993.

Tie	Home team (tier)	Score	Away team (tier)	Att.
1	Abbey Rangers	1–7	Queens Park Rangers	
2	Abbeydale Alvechurch	0–5	Wolverhampton Wanderers	
3	Amble Town	0–6	Sheffield Wednesday	
4	Bournemouth	10–0	Chailey Mavericks	
5	Bristol	13–0	Bristol Rovers	
6	Bronte	4–2	Bradford City	
7	Bury	4–1	Manchester City	
8	Chesterfield	3–1	TNT	
9	City Roses	0–4	Kilnhurst	
10	Cleveland	0–9	Wakefield	
11	Colchester Royals	2–6	St Germaine	
12	Collier Row	4–0	Sittingbourne	
13	Corematch	0–6	Whitehawk	
14	Cowgate Kestrels	2–1	Newcastle	
15	Dunstable	4–1	Langford	
16	Gosport Borough	1–2	Brighton & Hove Albion	
17	Hackney	2–3	Bromley Borough	
18	Haslington	1–5	Tranmere Rovers	
19	Hassocks	H–W	Havant	
Walkover for Hassocks
20	Hemel Hempstead	3–0	Brentford	
21	Huddersfield Town	14–1	Middlesbrough	
22	Inter Cardiff	3–1 (a.e.t.)	Bristol City	

Tie	Home team (tier)	Score	Away team (tier)	Att.
23	Kidderminster Harriers	13–0	Sporting Kesteven	
24	Lambeth	9–2	Palace Eagles	
25	Leicester City	1–7	Villa Aztecs	
26	Leyton Orient	3–2	Drayton Wanderers	
27	Liverpool District	0–5	Wigan	
28	Maidstone Tigresses	1–2	Epsom & Ewell	
29	Manchester Belle Vue	1–2	Broadoak	
30	Newbury	5–2	Launton	
31	Nottingham Argyle	3–2	Birmingham City	
32	Oxford United	3–0	Binfield	
33	Plymouth Pilgrims	4–5 (a.e.t.)	Worcester City	
34	Preston Rangers	3–2	Leek Town	
35	Pye	5–0	Leighton Linslade	
36	Rainworth Miners Welfare	5–0	Derby County	
37	SE Rangers	1–13	Tottenham Hotspur	
38	Shoreham	0–5	Horsham	
39	St Helens	5–1	Newsham	
40	Stockport County	1–0	Rochdale	
41	Torquay United	2–5	Truro City	
42	Town & County	9–0	Bedford Bells	
43	Walton & Hersham	2–3	Charlton	
44	Yate Town	0–6	Tongwynlais	

== Third round proper ==
All games were originally scheduled for 14, 21 and 28 November 1993.

Tie	Home team (tier)	Score	Away team (tier)	Att.
1	Broadoak	0–2	Wakefield	
2	Bromley Borough	7–0	Collier Row	
3	Bronte	1–2	Villa Aztecs	
4	Chesterfield	2–1	Bury	
5	Cowgate Kestrels	4–1	Kilnhurst	
6	Epsom & Ewell	2–1	Bournemouth	
7	Horsham	3–2	Bristol	
8	Lambeth	0–1	Charlton	
9	Leyton Orient	16–0	Queens Park Rangers	
10	Newbury	1–2	Brighton & Hove Albion	
11	Oxford United	2–4 (a.e.t.)	Inter Cardiff	

Tie	Home team (tier)	Score	Away team (tier)	Att.
12	Pye	0–3	Dunstable	
13	Rainworth Miners Welfare	2–4	Huddersfield Town	
14	St Helens	2–10	Wolverhampton Wanderers	
15	Stockport County	2–1	Nottingham Argyle	
16	Tongwynlais	2–5	Truro City	
17	Tottenham Hotspur	0–0 (a.e.t.)	St Germaine	
replay	St Germaine	1–3	Tottenham Hotspur	
18	Town & County	5–4 (a.e.t.)	Hemel Hempstead	
19	Tranmere Rovers	2–4	Sheffield Wednesday	
20	Whitehawk	8–2	Hassocks	
21	Wigan	2–5	Preston Rangers	
22	Worcester City	1–6	Kidderminster Harriers	

== Fourth round proper ==
All games were originally scheduled for 5 and 12 December 1993.

5 December 1993	Arsenal (1)	8–0	Sheffield Wednesday (2)	Enfield
	Spacey; Wylie; Britton; Philp	Report		Stadium: Southbury Road; Referee: R. Chilvers

5 December 1993	Charlton (3)	0–7	Leasowe Pacific (1)	Eltham
		Report	Thomas; Mallon; Mason; Easton; (o.g.)	Stadium: Charlton Training Ground; Attendance: 85

5 December 1993	Chesterfield (3)	1–2	Wakefield (3)
	Goal	Report	Goal	Attendance: 100

5 December 1993	Doncaster Belles (1)	9–0	Millwall Lionesses (1)
	Murray 13'; Borman 17', 21'; Walker 28', 32', 78'; Broadhurst 54'; Lisseman 47'; Woodhead 85'	Report

5 December 1993	Epsom & Ewell (2)	0–0 (a.e.t.)	Wimbledon (1)	Dorking
		Report		Stadium: Meadowbank; Referee: Steve Tyler

12 December 1993 Replay	Wimbledon (1)	1–2	Epsom & Ewell (2)	Tooting
	Jacobs 17'	Report	Hiscock 22'; Roberts 70'	Stadium: Sandy Lane; Referee: P.T. Crossley

5 December 1993	Horsham (2)	0–2	Brighton & Hove Albion (2)
		Report	Goal

5 December 1993	Huddersfield Town (3)	6–0	Whitehawk (3)	Dalton
	Terry Murphy; Knight; Mitchell 61'; Woodhead	Report		Stadium: Leeds Road Sports Complex; Attendance: 112

5 December 1993	Kidderminster Harriers (2)	1–1 (a.e.t.)	Cowgate Kestrels (2)
	Goal	Report	Goal

5 December 1993	Leyton Orient (3)	2–7	Knowsley United (1)	Walthamstow
	Goal	Report	Gallimore; Markey; Burke; Harper	Stadium: Wadham Lodge; Attendance: 80

5 December 1993	Preston Rangers (3)	6–2	Villa Aztecs (2)
	Goal	Report	Goal

5 December 1993	Red Star Southampton (1)	1–3	Bromley Borough (2)
	Goal	Report	Goal

5 December 1993	Stanton Rangers (1)	6–0	Dunstable (3)	Ilkeston
	Goal	Report		Stadium: Hallum Fields

5 December 1993	Tottenham Hotspur (3)	1–3	Inter Cardiff (3)	Cheshunt
	Goal	Report	Anderson; Burgess; Knight

5 December 1993	Truro City (3)	1–0	Stockport County (3)
	Goal	Report		Attendance: 150

5 December 1993	Wembley (1)	2–0	Wolverhampton Wanderers (2)
	Mooney 1'; Ede 45'	Report		Attendance: 50

12 December 1993	Town & County (2)	4–1	Ipswich Town (1)
	Goal	Report	Goal	Attendance: 60

== Fifth round proper ==
All games were played on 16 January and 2 February 1994.

16 January 1994	Brighton & Hove Albion (2)	1–0	Truro City (3)	Brighton
	Goal	Report		Stadium: Withdean Stadium; Attendance: 65

16 January 1994	Doncaster Belles (1)	10–1	Bromley Borough (2)	Doncaster
	Walker 2' 12'; Jackson 10'; Broadhurst 11', 22'; Woodhead 22'; Murray 30'; Coultard	Report	McGloin 17'	Stadium: Belle Vue; Attendance: 120

16 January 1994	Epsom & Ewell (2)	7–0	Inter Cardiff (3)	Dorking
	Condon 28', 38', 63', 70'; Darton 44', 85'; Roberts 86'	Report		Stadium: Meadowbank; Attendance: 154; Referee: Neil Copperwheat

16 January 1994	Kidderminster Harriers (2)	0–6	Preston Rangers (3)	Kidderminster
		Report	Barlow 5'; Cummings; Webb; Maxwell	Stadium: Aggborough Stadium; Attendance: 100

16 January 1994	Knowsley United (1)	5–2	Huddersfield Town (3)	Huyton
	Burke 6'; Gallimore 57'; Gore; Clarke (o.g.); Harper	Report	Knight 34'; Murphy	Stadium: Alt Park

16 January 1994	Leasowe Pacific (1)	9–0	Town & County (2)
	Thomas; Mallon; Cann; Formston	Report

16 January 1994	Wakefield (3)	1–3	Stanton Rangers (1)	Pontefract
	Fogarty	Report	Sturgeon; Harkes; Plinston	Stadium: Beechnut Lane; Attendance: 90

2 February 1994	Wembley (1)	2–4	Arsenal (1)	Wembley
	10' (o.g.); Liran 75' (pen.)	Report	Ball 40', 80'; Spacey 56', 76'	Stadium: Vale Farm; Attendance: 106

== Quarter–finals ==
All games were played on 13 February 1994.

13 February 1994	Arsenal (1)	0–1	Knowsley United (1)	Enfield
		Report	Gore 25'	Stadium: Southbury Road

13 February 1994	Doncaster Belles (1)	5–1	Brighton & Hove Albion (2)
	Borman 90'; Walker; Jackson 76' (pen.)	Report	Cottier

13 February 1994	Epsom & Ewell (2)	2–3 (a.e.t.)	Leasowe Pacific (1)	Dorking
	Leggett 64'; Darby 85'	Report	Thomas 9'; Mallon; Collins	Stadium: Meadowbank

13 February 1994	Preston Rangers (3)	2–3 (a.e.t.)	Stanton Rangers (1)
	Webb; Matthews 100'	Report	Brown 87'; Plinston 118'; Clay 119'

== Semi–finals ==
All games were played on 6 March 1994.

6 March 1994	Leasowe Pacific (1)	0–6	Doncaster Belles (1)	Blowick
		Report	Walker 11'; Coulthard 22', 50', 63'; Murray 39'; Broadhurst 57'	Stadium: Haig Avenue; Referee: A. R. Leake

6 March 1994	Stanton Rangers (1)	0–1	Knowsley United (1)	Ilkeston
		Report	Burke 11'	Stadium: New Manor Ground; Referee: A Storey (Doncaster)

== Final ==
24 April 1994

Doncaster Belles	1–0	Knowsley United
Walker 38'	Report

Glanford Park, Scunthorpe
Attendance: 1,674
Referee: Ian Hemley (Ampthill)
