= 1993–94 WFA National League Cup =

Tournament details
- Country: England
- Dates: 1993 – 1994

Final positions
- Champions: Arsenal
- Runners-up: Doncaster Belles

The 1993–94 WFA National League Cup was a football competition in England organised by the Women's Football Alliance and the Football Association Committee for Women's Football. It was the third edition of the Women's National League Cup, and included teams from the 1993–94 WFA National League Premier Division and level 2 divisions.

The Cup was established in 1991–92, along with the National League, by the Women's Football Association. The National League competitions were renamed the following season as the FA Women's Premier League, from 1994 to 1995 until 2018.

The 1993–94 trophy was won for the third consecutive time by Arsenal. In the 1994 final, they won 4–0 against Doncaster Belles. Doncaster were the 1993–94 season's Premier Division champions and had won the 1994 FA Women's Cup Final.

== Results ==
=== First round ===
Matches were played on 30 October 1993. Brighton & Hove Albion, Kidderminster Harriers, Town & County, Wimbledon and Stanton Rangers all received byes into the Second round. Abbeydale Alvechurch, St Helens and Bristol did not compete in the League Cup

31 October 1993	Bronte (NO)	0–4	Sheffield Wednesday (NO)
		Report	Goal

31 October 1993	Doncaster Belles (NA)	10–0	Maidstone Tigresses (S)
	Walker 9'; Skillcorn 26'; Coultard 51'; Woodhead 57'; Broadhurst 64'; Borman 68', 78', 84'; Jackson 83', 89'	Report

31 October 1993	Epsom & Ewell (S)	1–2	Bromley Borough (S)
	Condon 63'	Report	McCormick 32'; Grives 90'

31 October 1993	Horsham (S)	0–6	Arsenal (NA)
		Report	Pealling 26'; Wylie 47', 90+2'; Spacey; Philp 90+4'; Lonergan 90+6'

31 October 1993	Ipswich Town (NA)	1–4	Knowsley United (NA)
	Goal	Report	Goal

31 October 1993	Langford (NO)	3–5	Hemel Hempstead (NA)
	Goal	Report	Goal

31 October 1993	Leasowe Pacific (NA)	2–1	Cowgate Kestrels (NO)
	Thomas	Report	Oxley

31 October 1993	Millwall Lionesses (NA)	4–0	Oxford United (S)
	Goal	Report

31 October 1993	Nottingham Argyle (NO)	1–7	Red Star Southampton (NA)
	Goal	Report	Goal

31 October 1993	Villa Aztecs (NO)	0–5	Wolverhampton Wanderers (NO)
		Report	Goal

31 October 1993	Wembley (NA)	5–0	Hassocks (S)
	Lorton 19'; Grant 34', 39', 42', 56'	Report

=== Second round ===
Matches were played on 28 November 1993 and 2 January and 13 March 1994.

28 November 1993	Brighton & Hove Albion (S)	2–6	Leasowe Pacific (NA)
	Goal	Report	Thomas; Mallon; McGrady

28 November 1993	Doncaster Belles (NA)	9–0	Sheffield Wednesday (NO)
	Murray; Walker 30' 75' 84'; Broadhurst 35', 38', 65' (pen.), 85'	Report

28 November 1993	Hemel Hempstead (S)	3–4	Wimbledon (NA)
	Burton 5'; Lyons	Report	Goal

28 November 1993	Kidderminster Harriers (NO)	0–6	Arsenal (NA)
		Report	Wylie 25'; Spacey; Philp; Britton; Churchman

28 November 1993	Knowsley United (NA)	3–1	Wembley (NA)
	Gallimore 5', 9' (pen.), 68'	Report	Leach 88'

28 November 1993	Town & County (S)	1–3	Red Star Southampton (NA)
	Goal	Report	Goal

2 January 1994	Wolverhampton Wanderers (NO)	1–3	Bromley Borough (S)
	Goal	Report	Goal

13 March 1994	Millwall Lionesses (NA)	6–5 (a.e.t.)	Stanton Rangers (NA)
	Pemberton 117' (o.g.)	Report	Harkes; Sturgeon; Plinston; Bourne

=== Quarter-finals ===
Matches were played on 30 January and 27 March 1994.

30 January 1994	Arsenal (NA)	9–1	Red Star Southampton (NA)
	Churchman; Ball; Spacey; Sneddon	Report	8'

30 January 1994	Bromley Borough (S)	1–5	Knowsley United (NA)
	Goal	Report	Burke; Hallam; Gore

13 March 1994	Leasowe Pacific (NA)	2–2 (a.e.t.) (3–0 p)	Wimbledon (NA)
	Thomas; McGrady	Report	Goal
	Penalties
	Penalty scored		Penalty missed

27 March 1994	Millwall Lionesses (NA)	1–6	Doncaster Belles (NA)
	Buckley 46'	Report	Borman; Walker; Murray; Goodman; Broadhurst

=== Semi-finals ===
Matches were played on 10 April and 4 May 1994.

10 April 1994	Arsenal (NA)	4–1	Leasowe Pacific (NA)
	Lonergan; Spacey; Bampton	Report	Thomas 53'

4 May 1994	Knowsley United (NA)	0–4	Doncaster Belles (NA)
		Report	Coultard 17'; Borman

=== Final ===
13 November 1994

Arsenal	4–0	Doncaster Belles
Britton 20'; Spacey 40'; Jackson 76' (o.g.); Churchman 79'	Report

Abbey Stadium, Cambridge

GK	1	(England) Pauline Cope
RB	2	(England) Kirsty Pealling
CB	3	(England) Lisa Spry
CB	4	(England) Sharon Barber
CB	5	(Northern Ireland) Gill Wylie (c)
DM	6	(England) Vicki Slee
CM	7	(England) Sian Williams
CM	9	(England) Marieanne Spacey	(substituted off) 70'
FW	8	(England) Sammy Britton
FW	10	(England) Becky Lonergan
FW	11	(England) Karen Philp
Substitutes:
GK		(England) Lesley Shipp
DF		(England) Kelley Few
FW	12	(Wales) Naz Ball
FW	14	(England) Jo Churchman	(substituted on) 70'
FW	15	(England) Kelly Townshend
FW	17	(Scotland) Michelle Sneddon
Manager:
(England) Vic Akers

GK	1	(England) Debbie Biggins
DF	2	(England) Anne Lisseman
DF	3	(England) Chantel Woodhead
DF	4	(England) Mandy Lowe
DF	5	(England) Claire Utley
DF	6	(England) Michelle Jackson
MF	7	(England) Karen Skillcorn
MF	8	(England) Gillian Coultard
FW	9	(England) Karen Walker
FW	10	(England) Kirsty Majka
MF	11	(Wales) Nicky Davies	Substituted off
Substitutes:
MF	12	(England) Sarah Jones	Substituted on
Manager:
(England) Paul Edmunds
