= 1993–94 WFA National League =

WFA National League
- Season: 1993–94

The 1993–94 WFA National League season was the 3rd season of the WFA National League. The competition was organised by the Women's Football Alliance and the Football Association Committee for Women's Football.

Below the Premier Division were the Northern and Southern Divisions.

The 1993–94 women's championship was won by Doncaster Belles, their second National League trophy, after a title race with the previous champions, Arsenal.

This season coincided with the merger of the league's founding body, the Women's Football Association, into the FA in 1993. (The WFA had founded the National League in 1991.) The new organising Women's Football Alliance and FA Committee were composed of members from women's clubs, women's leagues, and FA representatives. New branding as the FA Women's Premier League began in 1994–95.

== Premier Division ==
WFA National League Premier Division
- Season: 1993–94
- Champions: Doncaster Belles; 2nd title
- Relegated: Ipswich Town; Wimbledon
- Matches: 90
- Goals: 464 (5.16 per match)
- Biggest home win: Knowsley United 15–0; Ipswich Town (8 May 1994)
- Biggest away win: Ipswich Town; 1–11 Arsenal (21 November 1993)

Locations of the WFA National League Premier Division Teams
Locations of the WFA National League Premier Division Teams (Greater London)

Changes from last season:

- Leasowe Pacific were promoted to the Premier Division
- District Line were promoted to the Premier Division
- Bronte were relegated to Division One North
- Maidstone Tigresses were relegated to Division One South
- District Line became Wembley

=== League table ===
Pos	Team	Pld	W	D	L	GF	GA	GD	Pts	Qualification or relegation
1	Doncaster Belles (C)	18	16	1	1	110	16	+94	49	
2	Arsenal	18	14	3	1	85	15	+70	45	
3	Knowsley United	18	13	2	3	62	30	+32	41	
4	Wembley	18	9	2	7	33	33	0	29	
5	Millwall Lionesses	18	8	2	8	38	46	−8	26	
6	Stanton Rangers	18	6	6	6	32	34	−2	24	
7	Leasowe Pacific	18	7	2	9	42	48	−6	23	
8	Red Star Southampton (Note: Red Star Southampton and Wimbledon deducted three points for failing to fulfil a fixture.)	18	2	3	13	25	70	−45	6	
9	Ipswich Town (R)	18	1	3	14	14	86	−72	6	Relegation to Northern Division
10	Wimbledon (R)	18	2	0	16	15	78	−63	3	Relegation to Southern Division

Source: WFA NL
(C) Champions; (R) Relegated

=== Results ===
Home \ Away	ARS	DON	IPS	KNO	LEA	MIL	RSS	STA	WEM	WIM
Arsenal	—	3–1	7–0	2–2	4–0	3–1	4–0	2–2	2–3	9–2
Doncaster Belles	2–2	—	10–0	7–0	11–0	6–1	9–3	3–0	2–0	10–0
Ipswich Town	1–11	0–3	—	1–1	2–8	2–5	1–1	0–4	2–4	2–1
Knowsley United	0–5	1–7	15–0	—	4–1	2–1	7–0	3–2	2–0	4–0
Leasowe Pacific	1–2	1–3	4–0	0–2	—	2–3	2–1	2–2	1–1	4–2
Millwall Lionesses	0–6	1–6	4–1	2–5	2–6	—	5–2	2–2	2–1	2–0
Red Star Southampton	0–7	1–10	1–1	2–5	2–0	0–3	—	2–2	1–4	3–4
Stanton Rangers	0–4	1–5	3–0	0–5	3–2	1–1	3–0	—	1–3	2–0
Wembley	0–5	1–5	2–1	0–1	3–4	1–0	3–2	0–0	—	5–1
Wimbledon	0–7	1–10	2–0	0–3	1–4	0–3	0–4	0–4	1–2	—

Source: WFA NL
Legend: Blue = home team win; Yellow = draw; Red = away team win.

== Division One North ==
WFA National League Division One North
- Season: 1993–94
- Champions: Wolverhampton Wanderers
- Promoted: Wolverhampton Wanderers
- Biggest home win: Abbeydale Alvechurch; 7–0 St Helens (23 January 1994)
- Biggest away win: St Helens 0–10 Bronte (7 November 1993)
- Highest scoring: Villa Aztecs 8–3 St Helens (5 October 1993)

Map showing the locations of the teams in the Division One North of the WFA National League
Map showing the locations of the teams in the Division One North of the WFA National League

Changes from last season:

- Leasowe Pacific were promoted to the Premier Division
- Kidderminster Harriers were promoted to Division One North
- Luton Town were promoted to Division One North
- Luton Town became Langford
- Bronte were relegated to Division One North
- Milton Keynes were relegated from the Premier Division
- Sunderland resigned from Division One North
- Wolverhampton became Wolverhampton Wanderers

=== League table ===
Pos	Team	Pld	W	D	L	GF	GA	GD	Pts	Promotion or relegation
1	Wolverhampton Wanderers (C, P)	18	12	4	2	61	28	+33	40	Promotion to the National Division
2	Sheffield Wednesday	18	13	1	4	46	20	+26	40	
3	Abbeydale Alvechurch	18	9	2	7	38	31	+7	29	
4	Bronte	18	8	4	6	46	26	+20	28	
5	Cowgate Kestrels	18	9	1	8	38	41	−3	28	
6	Villa Aztecs	18	8	3	7	37	34	+3	27	
7	St Helens	18	7	1	10	36	57	−21	22	
8	Langford	18	5	2	11	25	41	−16	17	
9	Nottingham Argyle	18	5	1	12	25	49	−24	16	
10	Kidderminster Harriers (O)	18	3	3	12	24	49	−25	12	Qualification for the relegation playoff

Source: WFA NL
(C) Champions; (O) Play-off winners; (P) Promoted

=== Results ===
Home \ Away	ABA	BRO	CWK	KIH	LAN	NOA	SHW	STH	ASV	WOW
Abbeydale Alvechurch	—	2–2	0–2	3–2	3–0	5–3	0–1	7–0	2–0	1–2
Bronte	5–2	—	2–0	5–2	3–0	3–0	0–2	1–2	1–1	2–2
Cowgate Kestrels	1–3	4–1	—	2–1	3–2	1–3	0–4	2–2	5–0	1–2
Kidderminster Harriers	0–3	3–2	1–2	—	1–1	1–0	2–4	3–4	1–4	2–2
Langford	2–1	0–1	1–2	2–0	—	0–4	3–1	2–1	1–2	3–3
Nottingham Argyle	3–3	1–6	2–5	0–2	1–0	—	1–5	3–0	0–1	2–0
Sheffield Wednesday	0–2	1–0	7–1	4–0	4–2	3–0	—	1–2	2–1	2–2
St Helens	0–1	0–10	3–0	4–2	2–5	4–1	0–1	—	1–2	6–1
Villa Aztecs	3–0	2–2	2–3	1–1	2–0	4–1	2–4	8–3	—	2–4
Wolverhampton Wanderers	5–0	2–0	5–4	6–0	7–1	6–0	2–0	7–2	3–0	—

Source: WFA NL
Legend: Blue = home team win; Yellow = draw; Red = away team win.

=== Relegation Playoff ===
Division One South	Score	North West Women’s League
Kidderminster Harriers	?–?	Manchester Bell Vue

== Division One South ==
WFA National League Division One South
- Season: 1993–94
- Matches: 90
- Goals: 360 (4 per match)
- Biggest home win: Hemel Hempstead; 10–0 Hassocks (6 February 1994)
- Biggest away win: Hassocks 1–10; Bromley Borough (3 April 1994)
- Longest winless run: Hassocks (18)

Map showing the locations of the teams in the Division One South of the WFA National League
Map showing the locations of the teams in the Division One South of the WFA National League
Map showing the locations of the teams in the Division One South of the WFA National League (Greater London)

Changes from last season:

- District Line were promoted to the National Division
- Bromley Borough were promoted to Division One South
- Maidstone Tigresses were relegated from the Premier Division
- Saltdean were relegated from Division One South
- Bristol Backwell became Bristol

=== League table ===
Pos	Team	Pld	W	D	L	GF	GA	GD	Pts	Promotion or relegation
1	Bromley Borough (C, P)	18	14	3	1	68	16	+52	45	Promotion to the National Division
2	Town & County	18	11	2	5	51	29	+22	35	
3	Bristol	18	11	1	6	50	34	+16	34	Resigned from the league after the end of the season
4	Epsom & Ewell	18	10	2	6	37	26	+11	32	Resigned from the league after the end of the season
5	Brighton & Hove Albion	18	9	4	5	36	23	+13	31	
6	Maidstone Tigresses	18	8	5	5	37	28	+9	29	
7	Hemel Hempstead	18	4	6	8	33	44	−11	18	
8	Horsham	18	4	4	10	24	33	−9	16	
9	Oxford United	18	3	4	11	17	37	−20	13	
10	Hassocks (R)	18	0	1	17	7	90	−83	1	Relegation

Source: WFA NL
(C) Champions; (P) Promoted; (R) Relegated

=== Results ===
Home \ Away	BHA	BRI	BRB	EAE	HAS	HEH	HOR	MAT	OXU	TAC
Brighton & Hove Albion	—	3–0	1–1	0–2	4–0	1–1	1–0	1–1	0–2	1–3
Bristol	1–2	—	3–4	3–2	9–0	3–0	W/O	1–4	3–1	2–5
Bromley Borough	1–1	0–1	—	2–1	4–0	7–0	2–0	3–1	5–3	3–0
Epsom & Ewell	1–5	2–2	0–5	—	5–0	4–1	0–0	3–0	3–0	1–0
Hassocks	0–6	3–6	1–10	0–6	—	1–1	0–2	0–2	0–1	1–5
Hemel Hempstead	1–2	0–5	0–2	3–0	10–0	—	2–2	2–5	4–1	2–0
Horsham	2–3	2–4	2–6	1–3	4–0	1–1	—	1–4	2–1	0–0
Maidstone Tigresses	1–0	0–4	1–1	3–1	5–0	3–3	2–1	—	1–1	1–2
Oxford United	1–4	1–2	0–5	0–1	2–0	1–1	1–2	0–0	—	0–3
Town & County	5–1	5–1	1–7	1–2	8–0	5–1	3–2	4–3	1–1	—

Source: WFA NL
Legend: Blue = home team win; Yellow = draw; Red = away team win.

== See also ==
- 1994 FA Women's Cup Final
- 1993–94 WFA Women's National League Cup
