= 1994 FA Women's Cup final =

1994 FA Women's Cup Final
- The match programme cover
- Event: 1993–94 FA Women's Cup
Doncaster Belles	Knowsley United
1	0
- Date: 24 April 1994
- Venue: Glanford Park, Scunthorpe
- Referee: Ian Hemley (Ampthill)
- Attendance: 1,674

The 1994 FA Women's Cup Final was the 24th final of the FA Women's Cup, England's primary cup competition for women's football teams. The showpiece event was played between Doncaster Belles and Knowsley United at Glanford Park in Scunthorpe on 24 April 1994. Knowsley United made its first final appearance, after losing the previous season's FA Women's Premier League Cup final at Wembley. Doncaster Belles entered their 11th final in 12 seasons, having won the trophy on five of those occasions.

Knowsley United entered the competition at the fourth round stage and beat Leyton Orient, Huddersfield Town, holders Arsenal and Stanton Rangers to reach the final. Doncaster Belles also entered at the fourth round and faced Millwall Lionesses, Bromley Borough, Brighton & Hove Albion and Leasowe Pacific before reaching the final. The Belles scored 25 goals and conceded two in their four matches.

Joy McQuiggan had joined Knowsley from Doncaster during the 1993–94 season. She had scored the winning goal for Leasowe Pacific in the 1989 final.

Watched by a crowd of 1,674, Doncaster Belles won the match 1–0, with a goal by Karen Walker.

== Match details ==
24 April 1994

Doncaster Belles	1–0	Knowsley United
Walker 38'	Report

Glanford Park, Scunthorpe
Attendance: 1,674
Referee: Ian Hemley (Ampthill)

Doncaster Belles	Knowsley United

GK	1	(England) Tracey Davidson
DF	2	(England) Mandy Lowe
DF	5	(England) Louise Ryde
DF	6	(England) Michelle Jackson
DF	3	(England) Chantel Woodhead
MF	8	(England) Gillian Coultard (c)	(substituted off) 34'
MF	7	(England) Julie Goodman
MF	11	(England) Janice Murray
MF	4	(England) Joanne Broadhurst
FW	9	(England) Karen Walker
FW	10	(England) Gail Borman
Substitutes:
MF	16	(England) Lorraine Young
MF	17	(England) Sheila Edmunds
FW	13	(England) Karen Skillcorn
DF	12	(England) Ann Lisseman	(substituted on) 34'	(substituted off) 89'
DF	15	(England) Julie Chipchase	(substituted on) 89'
Manager:
(England) Paul Edmunds

GK	1	(England) Jill Thomas
DF	2	(England) Sammy Hayward
DF	4	(England) Clare Taylor (c)
DF	5	(England) Dianne Coughlin
DF	3	(England) Joy McQuiggan
MF	6	(England) Angie Gallimore
MF	8	(England) Cathy Gore
MF	10	(England) Kerry Davis
MF	11	(New Zealand) Donna Baker	(substituted off) 82'
FW	7	(England) Karen Burke
FW	9	(England) Maria Harper
Substitutes:
FW	12	(England) Debbie Holland	(substituted on) 82'
DF	15	(England) Margie Parson
MF	16	(England) Nicki Barnes
GK	13	(England) Debbie Phillips
DF	14	(England) Pam Markey
Player/Manager:
(England) Angie Gallimore

Player of the match

Assistant referees:
M. J. Stoddart
M. P. Galey

Match rules

- 90 minutes.
- 30 minutes of extra-time if necessary.
- Penalty shoot-out if scores still level.
- Five named substitutes.
- Maximum of two substitutions.
