= Mac Barlow =

English footballer and manager

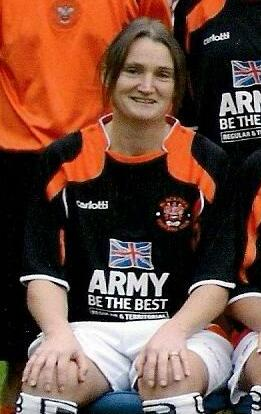
- Barlow at Bloomfield Road for the official 2009/10 team photo

Personal information
- Full name: Mac Barlow
- Date of birth: 31 May 1967 (age 59)
- Place of birth: Blackpool, England
- Height: 5 ft 6 in (1.68 m)
- Position: Forward

Senior career*
Years	Team	Apps	(Gls)
1982–1997	Preston Rangers WFC		
1997–2008	Preston North End		
2008–2017	Blackpool F.C. Ladies		
- * Club domestic league appearances and goals as of 07:33, 2 August 2019 (UTC)

Mac Barlow (born 31 May 1967) is an English football manager and former football player. She became the manager of Blackpool F.C. Ladies in May 2009. Barlow is well known amongst women's football fans and has had a long playing career.

== Playing career ==
Barlow played for Preston Rangers W.F.C. and was part of the team reached the semi-finals of the FA Women's Cup in 1982–83 and 1989–90, where she played left back. In 1997, they became Preston North End W.F.C. and finished 1997–98 as champions, winning promotion to the Northern Combination Women's Football League. In 1999 the club was officially affiliated with Preston North End F.C.

The club won the Northern Combination Women's Football League in 2005–06 and were promoted to the FA Women's Premier League Northern Division for the first time.

Barlow also had a spell at Blackpool Wren Rovers before joining Blackpool F.C. Ladies Barlow, who was part of the County Division Two side that won promotion in 2008–2009, took over from Mike O'Neil as Player Manager and brought in Dave Kelly, Marco Vidoretti and former Greenock Morton winger Mick Perrett to form the management team for that season. In the 2009–10 season they again won promotion as champions and for the second season running, were runners-up in the Lancashire FA County Cup after a 3–1 extra time defeat to Rochdale Blues at the LFA County Ground.

In the 2009–2010 season Barlow scored 19 goals in 20 appearances from left wing and secured the Blackpool F.C. Ladies to their second promotion is as many years.

In June 2010 Barlow ended her long association with Preston North End Women FC to concentrate fully on Blackpool, inviting former Preston North End Women FC Manager Chris Stammers to join the coaching staff at Blackpool.

In April 2011, Barlow and Blackpool FC Ladies made history by playing a competitive fixture on Bloomfield Road. Barlow shone in that game scoring two and being named Player of the Match. The Ladies were boosted in particular by a 6–0 victory at home to Carlisle. This was a significant fixture as it was the first time that Blackpool FC had hosted their own Ladies's team at Bloomfield Road in a competitive league fixture.

Barlow also coaches the Blackpool FC Ladies Under 11's team and is also Club secretary.

Barlow retired from playing football in June 2017.

== Personal life ==
Barlow is married to Ray and they have two children Kelly, (who also plays for Blackpool FC Ladies at left back) and Andy.
