= 1994–95 FA Women's Premier League =

FA Women's Premier League
- Season: 1994–95

The 1994–95 FA Women's Premier League season was the 4th season of the FA Women's Premier League. It was the first season under FA Premier League branding after the WFA Women's National League was founded in 1991–92.

Below the FA Women's Premier League National Division were the Northern and Southern Divisions.

The 1993–94 double-winners Doncaster Belles and League Cup winners Arsenal Ladies continued their rivalry in the National Division. Arsenal won their "fiercely contested" early-season match 3–0 with goals by Sammy Britton, Becky Lonergan and Jo Churchman.

At the end of 1994–95, Arsenal won their second title and equalled Doncaster's two championships at that point. The runners-up were Liverpool, renamed in 1994 and previously known as Knowsley United. The 1991–92 runner-up club were relegated, Red Star Southampton.

The season did not finish on time, according to The Independent in August 1995: "The Football Association doesn't help much. It took over the national team two years ago, and the administration of the domestic game last season - which then shambolically overran, ending six weeks late.".

== National Division ==
FA Women's Premier League National Division
- Season: 1994–95
- Champions: Arsenal; 2nd title
- Relegated: Red Star Southampton
- Matches: 90
- Goals: 379 (4.21 per match)
- Biggest home win: Wembley 8–1; Red Star Southampton (26 February 1995)
- Biggest away win: Red Star Southampton 1–10 Liverpool (11 September 1994)
- Longest winning run: Arsenal (17)
- Longest unbeaten run: Arsenal (18)

Locations of the FA Women's Premier League National Division Teams
Locations of the FA Women's Premier League National Division Teams (Greater London)

Changes from last season:

- Wolverhampton Wanderers were promoted from Division One North
- Bromley Borough were promoted from Division One South
- Knowsley United became Liverpool
- Stanton Rangers became Ilkeston Town Rangers
- Bromley Borough became Croydon

=== League table ===
Pos	Team	Pld	W	D	L	GF	GA	GD	Pts	Qualification or relegation
1	Arsenal (C)	18	17	1	0	60	8	+52	52	
2	Liverpool	18	12	3	3	58	17	+41	39	
3	Doncaster Belles	18	12	2	4	56	25	+31	38	
4	Croydon	18	9	2	7	42	24	+18	29	
5	Wembley	18	8	3	7	34	17	+17	27	
6	Leasowe Pacific	18	5	3	10	36	47	−11	18	
7	Ilkeston Town Rangers	18	4	3	11	21	49	−28	15	
8	Millwall Lionesses	18	4	3	11	25	60	−35	15	
9	Wolverhampton Wanderers	18	4	1	13	23	66	−43	13	
10	Red Star Southampton (R)	18	3	3	12	23	65	−42	12	Relegation to the Southern Division

Source: FA WPL
(C) Champions; (R) Relegated

=== Results ===
Home \ Away	ARS	CRO	DON	ITR	LEA	LIV	MIL	RSS	WEM	WOL
Arsenal	—	2–0	3–0	4–0	5–1	1–0	3–1	6–0	1–0	7–1
Croydon	2–3	—	1–3	3–0	0–0	3–1	4–0	2–2	1–3	5–1
Doncaster Belles	1–2	3–2	—	1–2	2–1	5–1	7–1	4–1	1–1	6–0
Ilkeston Town Rangers	0–2	1–0	1–6	—	1–7	0–0	1–2	1–3	1–0	5–1
Leasowe Pacific	1–4	0–4	1–4	2–2	—	0–1	2–2	3–4	2–1	5–3
Liverpool	0–0	3–0	4–1	7–1	4–1	—	4–1	4–0	2–1	4–0
Millwall Lionesses	0–5	2–7	1–4	3–0	1–3	0–7	—	3–3	0–0	3–2
Red Star Southampton	1–3	0–5	2–1	1–3	2–5	1–10	2–4	—	0–2	0–0
Wembley	1–3	0–1	0–2	4–0	2–0	1–1	2–1	8–1	—	6–0
Wolverhampton Wanderers	0–6	0–2	1–5	3–2	5–2	1–5	4–1	1–0	0–2	—

Source: FA WPL
Legend: Blue = home team win; Yellow = draw; Red = away team win.

== Northern Division ==
FA Women's Premier League Northern Division
- Season: 1994–95
- Champions: Villa Aztecs
- Promoted: Villa Aztecs
- Relegated: Solihull Borough
- Matches: 90
- Goals: 377 (4.19 per match)
- Biggest home win: St Helens/Garswood 10–1 Nottingham Argyle (28 May 1995)
- Biggest away win: Kidderminster Harriers 0–6 Bronte (12 March 1995)

Map showing the locations of the teams in the Northern Division of the FA Women's Premier League
Map showing the locations of the teams in the Northern Division of the FA Women's Premier League
Map showing the locations of the teams in the Northern Division of the FA Women's Premier League

Changes from last season:

- Wolverhampton Wanderers were promoted from Division One North
- Ipswich Town were relegated from the Premier Division
- Abbeydale Alvechurch became Solihull Borough
- St Helens became St Helens/Garswood

=== League table ===
Pos	Team	Pld	W	D	L	GF	GA	GD	Pts	Promotion or relegation
1	Villa Aztecs (C, P)	18	11	4	3	59	22	+37	37	Promotion to the National Division
2	Cowgate Kestrels	18	11	3	4	63	30	+33	36	
3	St Helens/Garswood	18	11	3	4	44	26	+18	36	
4	Sheffield Wednesday	18	9	4	5	38	29	+9	31	
5	Ipswich Town	18	8	4	6	33	28	+5	28	Moved to the Southern Division
6	Bronte	18	8	3	7	42	27	+15	27	
7	Langford	18	8	0	10	31	40	−9	24	
8	Kidderminster Harriers	18	4	2	12	24	57	−33	14	
9	Nottingham Argyle	18	3	2	13	21	67	−46	11	
10	Solihull Borough (R)	18	4	1	13	22	51	−29	7 (Note: Solihull Borough 6 points deducted)	Relegation

Source: WPL
(C) Champions; (P) Promoted; (R) Relegated

=== Results ===
Home \ Away	BRO	CWK	IPT	KIH	LAN	NOA	SHW	SOB	SHG	ASV
Bronte	—	2–2	0–2	2–3	4–1	5–0	4–0	2–3	2–0	3–3
Cowgate Kestrels	1–3	—	2–3	8–0	9–2	8–1	5–3	2–0	2–4	2–0
Ipswich Town	1–2	3–3	—	1–0	0–1	5–3	2–2	2–1	3–0	1–1
Kidderminster Harriers	0–6	1–3	1–2	—	4–3	3–3	0–5	0–0	1–2	1–5
Langford	3–2	0–1	2–1	0–1	—	2–0	3–0	6–1	0–2	0–4
Nottingham Argyle	1–1	1–4	1–4	2–1	0–2	—	1–2	1–2	1–0	1–4
Sheffield Wednesday	1–0	0–4	4–1	3–1	3–0	6–0	—	2–1	1–2	0–0
Solihull Borough	1–3	4–3	3–1	0–4	1–2	0–4	2–4	—	1–5	1–5
St Helens/Garswood	1–0	2–2	1–1	3–2	4–2	10–1	0–0	3–1	—	3–2
Villa Aztecs	4–1	1–2	2–0	9–1	3–2	8–1	1–1	2–0	4–2	—

Source: WPL
Legend: Blue = home team win; Yellow = draw; Red = away team win.

== Southern Division ==
FA Women's Premier League Southern Division
- Season: 1994–95
- Champions: Maidstone Tigresses
- Matches: 56
- Goals: 203 (3.63 per match)
- Biggest home win: Berkhamsted & Hemel 7–0 Oxford United (13 April 1995)
- Biggest away win: Brentford 1–6 Maidstone Tigresses (11 September 1995)
- Highest scoring: Berkhamsted & Hemel 6–4 Brentford (18 September 1994)
- Longest winless run: Horsham (14)

Map showing the locations of the teams in the Southern Division of the FA Women's Premier League
Map showing the locations of the teams in the Division One South of the WFA National League (Greater London)

Changes from last season:

- Bromley Borough were promoted to the National Division
- Hassocks were relegated from Division One South
- Hemel Hempstead became Berkhamsted & Hemel
- Bristol resigned from the league
- Epsom & Ewell resigned from the league

=== League table ===
Pos	Team	Pld	W	D	L	GF	GA	GD	Pts	Promotion or relegation
1	Maidstone Tigresses (C)	14	10	2	2	34	10	+24	32	Expunged from the League after the club refused promotion
2	Berkhamsted & Hemel	14	8	4	2	28	13	+15	28	
3	Oxford United	14	7	3	4	28	28	0	24	
4	Wimbledon	14	6	2	6	26	18	+8	20	
5	Brighton & Hove Albion	14	6	1	7	20	30	−10	19	
6	Town & County	14	5	3	6	22	25	−3	18	
7	Brentford	14	3	4	7	29	41	−12	13	
8	Horsham	14	0	3	11	16	38	−22	3	

Source: FA WPL
(C) Champions

=== Results ===
Home \ Away	BAH	BRE	BHA	HOR	MAT	OXU	TAC	WIM
Berkhamsted & Hemel	—	6–4	1–0	1–0	0–2	7–0	0–0	1–1
Brentford	0–0	—	2–4	0–0	1–6	1–5	3–4	2–1
Brighton & Hove Albion	2–3	2–2	—	2–1	1–4	2–1	1–0	0–4
Horsham	0–1	3–6	2–3	—	1–3	2–4	2–6	1–1
Maidstone Tigresses	1–1	4–1	0–1	2–1	—	3–0	5–0	1–0
Oxford United	0–3	1–1	4–1	3–2	2–2	—	0–0	3–1
Town & County	1–0	2–4	3–0	1–1	1–0	2–3	—	1–4
Wimbledon	2–4	3–2	3–1	5–0	0–1	1–2	2–1	—

Source: FA WPL
Legend: Blue = home team win; Yellow = draw; Red = away team win.

== See also ==
- UEFA Women's Euro 1995
