= Michelle Jackson =

Michelle Jackson may refer to:

- Michelle Jackson-Nobrega, tennis player
- Michelle Jackson (footballer), English footballer
- Michelle Jackson, of Mike and Michelle Jackson, an Australian multi-instrumental duo
