= Ayala Truelove =

Israeli international football striker (born 1975)

Ayala (née Liran) Truelove
Personal information
- Birth name: Ayala Liran
- Date of birth: 16 August 1965 (age 61)
- Position: Forward

Team information
- Current team: Bracknell Town Ladies

Senior career*
Years	Team	Apps	(Gls)
–1997	Wembley Ladies		
1997–	Croydon Women		
- Reading Royals
2000–2001	Southampton Saints		
- Barnet Ladies
- Thatcham
- Bracknell Town

International career
2001	Israel	2	(0)
- * Club domestic league appearances and goals

Ayala Truelove (née Liran, Hebrew: איילה לירן; born 16 August 1975) is an Israeli international football striker. She has also represented Great Britain in the sport of gliding.

== Football career ==
=== Club ===
Ayala won the 1995–96 FA Women's Premier League Cup with Wembley Ladies. In the final against Doncaster Belles she scored an injury time penalty to tie the game at 2–2; allowing Wembley to win on penalties. After being an unused substitute in Wembley's 1997 FA Women's Cup final defeat to Millwall Lionesses, Ayala signed for FA Women's Premier League National Division rivals Croydon.

A spell with Reading Royals preceded Ayala's return to the National Division with Southampton Saints in 2000. She also represented Thatcham before joining Bracknell Town Ladies. Having overcome a serious knee injury, Ayala continues with Bracknell Town as of 2011.

=== International ===
Ayala was called–up by Israel and won 12 caps, including two appearances in qualifying for the 2003 FIFA Women's World Cup.

== Gliding ==
In 2001 Ayala took up gliding and represented Great Britain at the 2009 Women's World Gliding Championships in Szeged. After leading for much of the competition she finished fourth. At the 2011 competition in Arboga Ayala won a silver medal. In 2013 in the Women's World Gliding Championships in Issoudun, Ayala again won a silver medal after leading at the start of the final day. She represented Great Britain in the Club-class in the full British team (not the women's team) at 2017 European Gliding Championships at Moravská Třebová, Czech Republic.

In the 2026 Dunstable Regionals as at Day 4, she was dead last.
