= Chantel Woodhead =

English footballer

Personal information
- Full name: Chantel Marie Woodhead
- Date of birth: 17 September 1974 (age 52)
- Place of birth: Leeds, England
- Height: 5 ft 3 in (1.60 m)
- Position: Left-back

Senior career*
| Years | Team | Apps | (Gls) |
- Bradford City Women
- Bronte Ladies
- Doncaster Belles
- Everton Ladies
| 2002–2003 | Leeds United Ladies | | |
| 2003–2004 | Everton Ladies | | |

International career^{‡}
| 1995 | England Women | 1 | (0) |
- * Club domestic league appearances and goals as of 19:53, 11 September 2007 (UTC) ‡ National team caps and goals as of 19:53, 24 November 2011 (UTC)

Chantel Marie "Channy" Woodhead (born 17 September 1974 in Leeds, England) is a former English international football player. She played as a left back for clubs including Doncaster Belles and Everton Ladies. Woodhead won a single cap for the senior England team.

== Club career ==
In 1994 Woodhead won the Women's FA Cup with Doncaster Belles when they defeated Knowsley United 1-0 at Glanford Park.

Woodhead played for Doncaster Belles while working in the mail order department of Leeds United. Following a spell at Everton, she signed for hometown club Leeds United Ladies in summer 2002.

== International career ==
On 26 January 1995, Woodhead played the first half of England's 1–1 friendly draw against Italy in Florence. She was substituted off for Hope Powell at half–time. On the day of the match, Woodhead had been admonished by the England management for wearing non–regulation trousers.

Woodhead was overlooked for the 1995 FIFA Women's World Cup squad by manager Ted Copeland. It was suggested to Woodhead that the dress code breach was reflective of her attitude: "So it looks like I've been dropped for wearing the wrong trousers. And what can you say to that? But it doesn't make you feel like going again, does it?"

She was allotted 105 when the FA announced their legacy numbers scheme to honour the 50th anniversary of England’s inaugural international.
