= Gill Wylie =

Northern Irish footballer

Personal information
- Date of birth: 27 August 1965 (age 61)
- Place of birth: Bangor, Northern Ireland
- Position: Defender

Senior career*
Years	Team	Apps	(Gls)
- Clucas Strikers
- Tottenham Hotspur
1991–1997	Arsenal		
1997–2000	Croydon		
2000	Charlton Athletic		

International career
1982–1990	Northern Ireland		

Managerial career
- 2000: Charlton Athletic
- * Club domestic league appearances and goals as of 19:16, 5 May 2022 (UTC)

Gillian Wylie (née Totten; born 27 August 1965) is a Northern Irish football coach and former player. She played for the Northern Ireland women's national football team and for Arsenal and Croydon at club level.

== Club career ==
After moving to London from her native Bangor, County Down, Wylie left Tottenham for Arsenal in 1991. She was the captain of Vic Akers' treble winning team in 1992–93.

In August 1995, Wylie suffered an anterior cruciate ligament injury. In 1997, Debbie Bampton persuaded Wylie to leave Arsenal for Croydon, where she regained full fitness and became an important player in the team which won the FA Women's Premier League National Division in 1998–99 and a League and Cup double in 1999–00.

Wylie was in favour of Croydon's controversial hostile takeover by Charlton Athletic: "It's been a bit of farce, but we want to affiliate with Charlton for long-term benefit". After briefly serving as player-manager of the newly formed Charlton Athletic W.F.C., she resigned in November 2000, to be replaced by Keith Boanas.

== International career ==
On 19 September 1982, 17-year-old Wylie scored Northern Ireland's goal against England at Gresty Road, Crewe, in a 7–1 1984 European Competition for Women's Football qualifying defeat.

In June 1985, she became the first female footballer ever to be sanctioned by UEFA, receiving a four-match ban for being sent-off in Northern Ireland's 1–0 1987 European Competition for Women's Football qualifying defeat by the Republic of Ireland at Milltown on 5 May 1985.

== Personal life ==
Wylie is a graduate of Queen's University Belfast. Outside football, she worked in the financial services industry. She has two sons.
