= List of English women's football champions =

English women's football champions

English Women's League (1st tier)

WFA National League Premier Division (1991–1994) FA Women's Premier League National Division (1994–2010) Women's Super League (2011–2013, 2018-present) WSL1 (2014-2016, 2017-2018) WSL1 Spring Series (2017; unofficial)
- Country
- England Wales (some clubs)
- Founded
- 1991
- Number of teams
- 14 (2026–27)
- Current champions
- Manchester City (2025–26)
- Most successful club
- Arsenal (15 championships)

The English women's football champions are the winners of the highest national league in women's football in England. From 1991 this was the WFA National League/FA Women's Premier League, and since 2011 the Women's Super League.

== First champions ==
=== Early 20th century ===
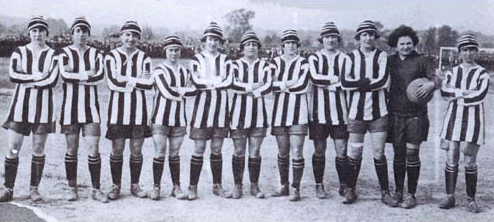
The Dick, Kerr Ladies in the U.S., 1922

The codification of professional men's football by the Football Association in 1885 and the Football League in 1888 did not coincide with similar measures for the women's teams who were playing in those years. Clubs such as the British Ladies' Football Club (founded in 1895) mainly competed in friendly matches and national tours with some success.

Women's football had a resurgence in popularity and attendances around the country during and after the First World War. During the 1920–21 season, the Dick, Kerr Ladies F.C. toured Great Britain and won 58 matches out of 59 played, with one draw.

Stoke Ladies F.C. were the first known winners of a women's national knockout tournament in 1922, the English Ladies Football Association Challenge Cup, played under an effective ban on women's football by the FA. The renamed Dick, Kerr team, Preston Ladies, faced Edinburgh for a (British) cup named the Ladies' Football World Championship, on at least two occasions in the 1930s. Preston won in 1937 by a 5–1 score, but the trophy went to Scotland in 1939, when Edinburgh won the title, beating Preston 5–2 in an apparently longer club competition.

=== Women's Football Association (WFA) ===
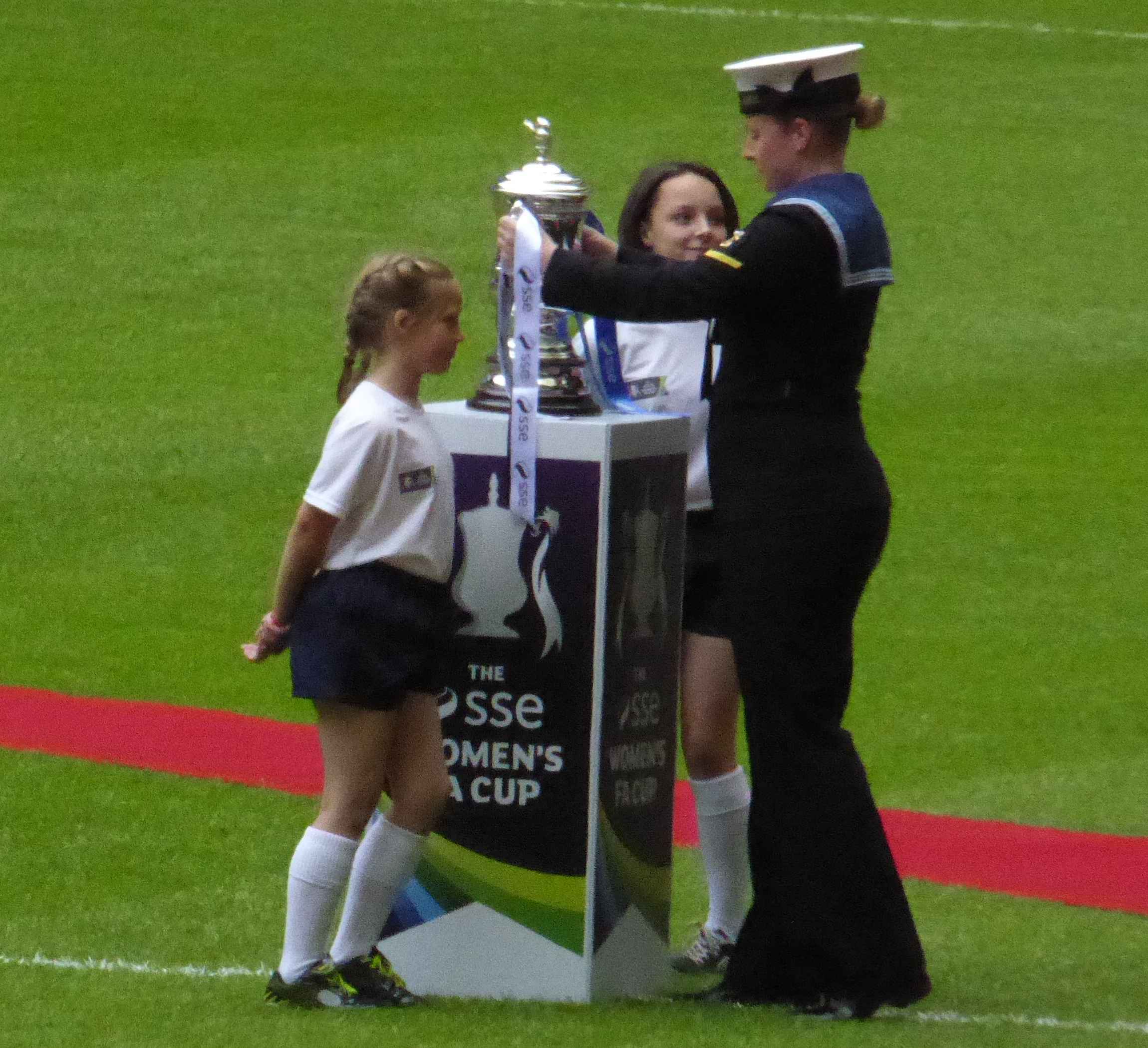
Women's FA Cup trophy

The WFA was founded in November 1969 as the Ladies Football Association of Great Britain, when the main women's football competitions were Regional Leagues. After the English Football Association reversed its 1921 ban on women's games at its grounds, the WFA Cup began in 1970–71, a national competition initially including many clubs outside of England. In the 1971 Final, Southampton Women's F.C. became the champions by beating Kilmarnock's Stewarton Thistle, who won the first Scottish Women's Cup in the same year.

Southampton were the leading English team of the era, WFA Cup-winners eight times between 1971 and 1981, and runners-up twice. Doncaster Belles won their first WFA Cup Final in 1983 and proceeded to reach almost every Final in the next decade; the 1990 Final was their fourth Cup victory, but Millwall Lionesses beat Doncaster in the Final in 1991.

At this time, the WFA received a grant from the Sports Council to create the Women's National League. This began in the 1991–92 season with eight teams in the Premier Division, and 16 teams in the Northern and Southern Divisions. The WFA Cup (Women's FA Cup) has continued alongside the leagues, and the Women's National League Cup also started in 1991–92. Since then, the top-level league has determined the annual champions of English women's football – this encompasses the division's renaming as the FA Women's Premier League (from 1994), qualification to the UEFA Women's Cup (from 2001), and the addition of the FA WSL (from 2011).

== List of League champions ==
Note: Bold designates teams that won a double with the Women's FA Cup.
† Arsenal won a treble with the UEFA Women's Cup in 2007.

=== WFA National League Premier Division (1991–1994) ===
Season	Champions (number of titles)	Runners-up	Third place	Top scorers	Goals
1991–92	Doncaster Belles	Red Star Southampton	Wimbledon	(England) Karen Walker (Doncaster Belles)	36
1992–93	Arsenal	Doncaster Belles	Knowsley United		
1993–94	Doncaster Belles (2)	Arsenal	Knowsley United		

=== FA Women's Premier League National Division (1994–2010) ===
Season	Champions (number of titles)	Runners-up	Third place	Top scorers	Goals
1994–95	Arsenal (2)	Liverpool	Doncaster Belles		
1995–96	Croydon	Doncaster Belles	Arsenal		
1996–97	Arsenal (3)	Doncaster Belles	Croydon	(England) Joanne Broadhurst (Arsenal)	21
1997–98	Everton	Arsenal	Doncaster Belles		
1998–99	Croydon (2)	Arsenal	Doncaster Belles		
1999–2000	Croydon (3)	Doncaster Belles	Arsenal		
2000–01	Arsenal (4)	Doncaster Belles	Charlton Athletic		
2001–02	Arsenal (5)	Doncaster Belles	Charlton Athletic		
2002–03	Fulham	Doncaster Belles	Arsenal		
2003–04	Arsenal (6)	Charlton Athletic	Fulham		
2004–05	Arsenal (7)	Charlton Athletic	Everton	(England) Trudy Williams (Bristol Rovers)	20
2005–06	Arsenal (8)	Everton	Charlton Athletic	(England) Kelly Smith (Arsenal)	18
2006–07	Arsenal (9)†	Everton	Charlton Athletic	(England) Lianne Sanderson (Arsenal)	29
2007–08	Arsenal (10)	Everton	Leeds United	(England) Lianne Sanderson (Arsenal)	25
2008–09	Arsenal (11)	Everton	Chelsea	(England) Kelly Smith (Arsenal)	25
2009–10	Arsenal (12)	Everton	Chelsea	(Scotland) Kim Little (Arsenal)	17

=== Women's Super League (2011–present) ===
Season	Champions (number of titles)	Runners-up	Third place	Top scorers	Goals
2011	Arsenal (13)	Birmingham City	Everton	(England) Rachel Williams (Birmingham City)	14
2012	Arsenal (14)	Birmingham City	Everton	(Scotland) Kim Little (Arsenal)	11
2013	Liverpool	Bristol Academy	Arsenal	(England) Natasha Dowie (Liverpool)	13
2014	Liverpool (2)	Chelsea	Birmingham City	(England) Karen Carney (Birmingham)	8
2015	Chelsea	Manchester City	Arsenal	(England) Beth Mead (Sunderland)	12
2016	Manchester City	Chelsea	Arsenal	(England) Eniola Aluko (Chelsea)	9
2017 Spring Series (Note: The 2017 FA WSL Spring Series is not an official championship.)	Chelsea (unofficial)	Manchester City	Arsenal	(England) Fran Kirby (Chelsea)	6
2017-18	Chelsea (2)	Manchester City	Arsenal	(England) Ellen White (Birmingham City)	15
2018–19	Arsenal (15)	Manchester City	Chelsea	(Netherlands) Vivianne Miedema (Arsenal)	22
2019–20 (Note: Due to the COVID-19 Pandemic the season ended early and the league was decided on a points per game basis.)	Chelsea (3)	Manchester City	Arsenal	(Netherlands) Vivianne Miedema (Arsenal)	16
2020–21	Chelsea (4)	Manchester City	Arsenal	(Australia) Sam Kerr (Chelsea)	21
2021–22	Chelsea (5)	Arsenal	Manchester City	(Australia) Sam Kerr (Chelsea)	20
2022–23	Chelsea (6)	Manchester United	Arsenal	(England) Rachel Daly (Aston Villa)	22
2023–24	Chelsea (7)	Manchester City	Arsenal	(Jamaica) Khadija Shaw (Manchester City)	21
2024–25	Chelsea (8)	Arsenal	Manchester United	(England) Alessia Russo (Arsenal) (Jamaica) Khadija Shaw (Manchester City)	12
2025–26	Manchester City (2)	Arsenal	Chelsea	(Jamaica) Khadija Shaw (Manchester City)	22

== Total titles won ==
Since 1991, eight separate clubs have won an English women's national league championship. Four more clubs have been the national runners-up.

Note: Bold designates teams competing in 2026–27 Women's Super League season.

Club	Winners	Runners- up	Winning seasons	Runner-up seasons
Arsenal	15	6	1992–93, 1994–95, 1996–97, 2000–01, 2001–02, 2003–04, 2004–05, 2005–06, 2006–07, 2007–08, 2008–09, 2009–10, 2011, 2012, 2018–19	1993–94, 1997–98, 1998–99, 2021–22, 2024–25, 2025–26
Chelsea	8	2	2015, 2017–18, 2019–20, 2020–21, 2021–22, 2022–23, 2023–24, 2024–25	2014, 2016
Croydon/Charlton Athletic	3	2	1995–96, 1998–99, 1999–2000	2003–04, 2004–05
Doncaster Belles/Doncaster Rovers Belles	2	7	1991–92, 1993–94	1992–93, 1994–95, 1995–96, 1996–97, 1999–2000, 2000–01, 2001–02, 2002–03
Manchester City	2	6	2016, 2025–26	2015, 2017–18, 2018–19, 2019–20, 2020–21, 2023–24
Liverpool	2	1	2013, 2014	1994–95
Everton	1	5	1997–98	2005–06, 2006–07, 2007–08, 2008–09, 2009–10
Fulham	1	0	2002–03	
Birmingham City	0	2		2011, 2012
Red Star Southampton	0	1		1991–92
Bristol Academy/Bristol City	0	1		2013
Manchester United	0	1		2022–23

== See also ==
- List of women's association football clubs in England
- List of Belgian women's football champions
- List of French women's football champions
- List of German women's football champions
- List of Swedish women's football champions
- List of association football competitions
