= Lucy Ward (footballer) =

English footballer & commentator

Personal information
- Date of birth: 15 April 1974 (age 52)
- Position: Forward

Senior career*
Years	Team	Apps	(Gls)
1996–2002	Leeds United		(164)
2002–2003	Doncaster Rovers Belles	?	(14)
2003–2009	Leeds United	?	(104)
- * Club domestic league appearances and goals

Lucy Ward (born 15 April 1974) is a broadcaster and former English footballer. Ward has held various hosting, commentary and punditry roles for broadcasters including BBC, ITV, Channel 4, Sky Sports, BT Sport, Setanta Sports, ESPN, CBS, TNT Sports, talkSPORT, DAZN, Disney+ and Prime Video across Champions League, Europa League, Premier League, Women's Super League and international football.

Ward has covered every major women’s football tournament and Olympics since 2007. She was part of the BAFTA-winning BBC coverage for the Women's European Championships in 2022 and nominated as part of ITV's broadcasting of the Women's World Cup a year later. Ward was also named as one of The Guardian’s broadcasters of the season for 2024/2025.

Prior to broadcasting, Ward was a professional footballer and played for Leeds United Ladies and Doncaster Rovers Belles for more than a decade. She played a key role in the Leeds United side which reached a Women's FA Cup final for the first time in 2006.

Ward later became head of education and welfare at Leeds United after her retirement from football and worked with players such as James Milner, Aaron Lennon, Fabian Delph and Kalvin Phillips.

In addition to her broadcasting work, Ward has been an advocate and driver for change for women in sport and media.

== Club career ==
Ward joined Leeds United Ladies when it was a community team, playing as a forward during the side's rise to become one of the best teams in England.

She moved to Doncaster Rovers Belles in the 2002–03 season, returning to Leeds United for the start of the following season.

Ward played in Lucas Radebe's testimonial at Elland Road in May 2005, scoring soon after coming on as a substitute for Gary Speed and later setting up a goal for Matthew Kilgallon.

She was an important member of the Leeds United squad that reached the Women's FA Cup final for the first time in May 2006, finishing runners up in a 5-0 defeat to Arsenal Ladies.

She became head of education and welfare at Leeds United's academy, overseeing around 250 junior players and a handful of young first-team players including James Milner, Aaron Lennon, Fabian Delph and Kalvin Phillips.

She left the position in 2015, winning a high-profile legal battle (in June 2016) against Leeds owner Massimo Cellino over her dismissal.

== International career ==
Ward represented England at Under-21 level at just 16 years of age.

== Other ==
Ward’s first broadcasting role at an international event was the Women’s World Cup in China in 2007 with the BBC before she covered the Olympics a year later for the same broadcaster and Eurosport.

An ever-present feature of the BBC's football coverage for the London Olympics in 2012, Ward worked alongside figures such as Alan Hansen, Mark Lawrenson and Jacqui Oatley.

Ward was part of the BAFTA winning BBC coverage for the Women's European Championships in 2022 and nominated as part of ITV's broadcasting of the Women's World Cup a year later.

She also covered the men's World Cup in Qatar in 2022 and European Championships in 2024 for CBS.

Her partner is former Leeds United and Liverpool Ladies head coach Neil Redfearn.

== Career statistics ==
Appearances and goals by club, season and competition
Club	Season	League		WFA Cup		Premier League Cup		County Cup		Other		Total	
Club	Season	Apps	Goals	Apps	Goals	Apps	Goals	Apps	Goals	Apps	Goals	Apps	Goals
Leeds United	1996–97												41
Leeds United	1997–98												24
Leeds United	1998–99												20
Leeds United	1999–2000												25
Leeds United	2000–01												21
Leeds United	2001–02												18
Leeds United	2002–03												17
Doncaster Rovers Belles	2002–03		11										14
Leeds United	2003–04		12										20
Leeds United	2004–05		9										16
Leeds United	2005–06		8										16
Leeds United	2006–07		10										19
Leeds United	2007–08											inj	
Leeds United	2008–09		3										3
