= Melanie Reay =

English footballer and manager (born 1981)

Melanie Copeland
Personal information
- Full name: Melanie Reay Copeland
- Birth name: Melanie Reay
- Date of birth: 21 November 1981 (age 44)
- Height: 5 ft 7 in (1.70 m)
- Position: Forward

Team information
- Current team: Sunderland (manager)

Youth career
- Sunderland

Senior career*
Years	Team	Apps	(Gls)
–2006	Sunderland		
2006–2010	Newcastle United		

Managerial career
- 2008–2010: Newcastle United (assistant)
- 2015–2017: Sunderland (assistant)
- 2017–: Sunderland
- 2018: England U23
- * Club domestic league appearances and goals

Melanie Copeland (née Reay) is an English professional football manager and former player who manages FA Women's National League club Sunderland.

== Club career ==
As a teenager, Copeland joined the Cowgate Kestrels, which later went on to become Sunderland. During the 2002–03 season, she scored 17 goals and shared the FA Women's Premier League Northern Division Golden Boot with Oldham Curzon's Kelly Dean. The following season, she won the Golden Boot again. During the 2004–05 season she scored 16 goals in 22 appearances, helping the Lady Black Cats win the Northern Division. In her last season at Sunderland, she made 18 appearances, scoring 5 goals.

Copeland joined Newcastle United in 2006. She scored 9 goals in 4 appearances for the reserves and 18 goals in 21 appearances with the first team. The following season, she scored 2 goals in 3 appearances for the reserves and 26 goals with the first team and was once again recognised as the FA Women's Premier League Northern Division top goalscorer at the FA Women's Football Awards in London. During the 2008–09 season, she scored 4 goals in 2 appearances for the reserves and 16 goals in 14 appearances for the first team. In her last season at Newcastle United, she made 9 appearances, scoring 3 goals.

== Coaching career ==
Copeland began her coaching career at Gateshead College in 2001, and later she coached at the Newcastle United Centre of Excellence. In January 2008, while still playing for the Magpies, she stepped up to take over the role of assistant manager to Neil Baistow, replacing Rob Atkin, who became the club's head coach. Baistow and Copeland both left Newcastle United at the end of the 2009–10 season.

Sunderland appointed Copeland as assistant head coach ahead of the 2015 season. In March 2017, she became head coach, replacing Carlton Fairweather.

In August 2018, she was put in charge of the England women's U23 national team for the 2018 Nordic Tournament in Sarpsborg, after being released by Sunderland and Gateshead College for the trip.

== Personal life ==
Copeland is the cousin of Alan Shearer.

== Career statistics ==
=== Managerial ===
As of 15 January 2019.

Team	From	To	Record					
Team	From	To	G	W	D	L	Win %	Ref.
England U23	29 August 2018	3 September 2018	3	1	1	1	33.33	
Sunderland	16 March 2017	Present	52	24	5	23	46.15	

== Honours ==
=== Player ===
Sunderland

- FA Women's Premier League Northern Division: 2004–05

Individual

- FA Women's Premier League Northern Division Golden Boot: 2002–03, 2003–04, 2007–08
