= 2004–05 FA Women's Premier League =

FA Women's Premier League
- Season: 2004–05

The 2004–05 FA Women's Premier League season was the 14th season of the FA Women's Premier League.

== National Division ==
FA Women's Premier League National Division
- Season: 2004–05
- Champions: Arsenal; 8th title
- Relegated: Liverpool; Bristol City
- UEFA Cup: Arsenal
- Matches: 90
- Goals: 309 (3.43 per match)
- Top goalscorer: Trudy Williams (20 goals)
- Biggest away win: Leeds United 0–8 Everton (15 August 2004)
- Highest scoring: Leeds United 8–3 Liverpool (26 September 2004)
- Longest unbeaten run: Arsenal (18)

Locations of the FA Women's Premier League National Division Teams
Locations of the FA Women's Premier League National Division Teams (Greater London)

The National Division season started on 15 August 2004 and ended on 7 May 2005. Arsenal were the defending champions, while Liverpool and Bristol City entered as the promoted teams from the 2003–04 Northern and Southern Divisions. Arsenal won their second consecutive league title, and seventh overall.

Changes from last season:

- Liverpool were promoted from the Northern Division
- Bristol City were promoted from the Southern Division
- Aston Villa were relegated to the Northern Division
- Tranmere Rovers were relegated to the Northern Division

=== Table ===
Pos	Team	Pld	W	D	L	GF	GA	GD	Pts	Qualification or relegation
1	Arsenal (C)	18	15	3	0	57	13	+44	48	Qualification for the UEFA Cup qualifying round
2	Charlton Athletic	18	13	2	3	43	17	+26	41	
3	Everton	18	11	4	3	45	24	+21	37	
4	Birmingham City	18	9	3	6	37	28	+9	30	
5	Bristol Rovers	18	9	1	8	35	28	+7	28	
6	Leeds United	18	8	2	8	31	34	−3	26	
7	Fulham	18	3	5	10	18	39	−21	14	
8	Doncaster Rovers Belles	18	3	3	12	10	38	−28	12	
9	Liverpool (R)	18	3	2	13	21	49	−28	11	Relegation to the Northern Division
10	Bristol City (R)	18	2	3	13	12	39	−27	9	Relegation to the Southern Division

Source: FA WPL
(C) Champions; (R) Relegated

=== Results ===
Home \ Away	ARS	BIR	BCI	BRO	CHA	DON	EVE	FUL	LEE	LIV
Arsenal	—	8–1	7–0	2–0	2–2	3–0	2–0	6–2	1–0	4–1
Birmingham City	2–5	—	4–0	3–1	1–0	0–0	2–3	3–0	2–2	6–0
Bristol City	2–3	0–1	—	0–2	0–4	3–0	1–3	0–0	0–1	0–1
Bristol Rovers	1–5	0–1	2–2	—	1–3	5–0	1–2	3–2	2–1	5–1
Charlton Athletic	0–1	3–2	1–0	3–1	—	2–0	2–1	4–1	1–2	3–1
Doncaster Rovers Belles	0–1	1–0	2–0	0–3	1–3	—	0–1	1–0	0–4	2–6
Everton	1–1	2–2	4–1	3–2	2–2	5–2	—	2–1	1–3	2–1
Fulham	0–0	1–4	4–2	0–3	0–4	0–0	0–0	—	2–1	2–1
Leeds United	1–2	0–2	0–0	0–2	1–5	1–0	0–8	4–2	—	8–3
Liverpool	0–4	2–1	0–1	0–1	0–1	1–1	1–5	1–1	1–2	—

Source: FA WPL
Legend: Blue = home team win; Yellow = draw; Red = away team win.

=== Top goalscorers ===
Rank	Player	Team	Goals
1	(England) Trudy Williams	(England) Bristol Rovers	20
2	(England) Karen Walker	(England) Leeds United	14
3	(England) Angela Banks	(England) Arsenal	13
4	(Scotland) Julie Fleeting	(England) Arsenal	12
5	(England) Eniola Aluko	(England) Charlton Athletic	10
5	(England) Kelly McDougall	(England) Everton	10

== Northern Division ==
FA Women's Premier League Northern Division
- Season: 2004–05
- Champions: Sunderland
- Promoted: Sunderland
- Relegated: Sheffield Wednesday; Coventry City
- Matches: 132
- Goals: 474 (3.59 per match)
- Top goalscorer: Amy McCann (goals 20)
- Biggest away win: Oldham Curzon 1–9 Sunderland (28 November 2004)

Map showing the locations of the teams in the Northern Division of the FA Women's Premier League
Map showing the locations of the teams in the Northern Division of the FA Women's Premier League

The Northern Division season began on 15 August 2004 and ended on 2 May 2005.

Changes from last season:

- Liverpool were promoted to the National Division
- Blackburn Rovers were promoted from the Midland Combination League
- Aston Villa were relegated from the National Division
- Tranmere Rovers were relegated from the National Division
- Bangor City were relegated to the Northern Combination League
- Chesterfield were relegated to the Midland Combination League

=== League table ===
Pos	Team	Pld	W	D	L	GF	GA	GD	Pts	Promotion or relegation
1	Sunderland (C, P)	22	17	2	3	66	26	+40	53	Promotion to the National Division
2	Wolverhampton Wanderers	22	14	5	3	46	19	+27	47	
3	Blackburn Rovers	22	10	9	3	59	39	+20	39	
4	Stockport County	22	7	9	6	37	39	−2	30	
5	Lincoln City	22	8	5	9	43	48	−5	29	
6	Aston Villa	22	8	4	10	36	43	−7	28	
7	Middlesbrough	22	6	6	10	34	41	−7	24	
8	Tranmere Rovers	22	7	3	12	31	38	−7	24	
9	Oldham Curzon	22	6	6	10	34	42	−8	24	
10	Manchester City	22	7	3	12	29	45	−16	24	
11	Sheffield Wednesday (R)	22	5	8	9	26	40	−14	23	Relegation to the Northern Combination League
12	Coventry City (R)	22	4	6	12	33	54	−21	18	Relegation to the Midland Combination League

Source: FA WPL
(C) Champions; (P) Promoted; (R) Relegated

=== Results ===
Home \ Away	ASV	BLR	CVC	LIC	MCI	MID	OLC	SHW	STC	SUN	TRR	WOW
Aston Villa	—	2–2	3–2	4–3	3–0	2–1	0–2	0–3	2–3	0–3	3–2	0–2
Blackburn Rovers	4–1	—	2–1	2–2	6–1	1–3	2–2	6–1	1–1	4–3	2–1	1–1
Coventry City	2–2	1–7	—	0–0	2–3	4–4	2–0	3–1	4–1	4–2	0–2	2–2
Lincoln City	1–2	3–3	1–0	—	5–0	2–2	3–0	3–1	2–3	3–4	2–1	0–4
Manchester City	2–0	4–0	3–0	1–4	—	1–0	0–2	3–3	4–0	0–3	2–1	2–4
Middlesbrough	0–1	2–2	3–0	0–0	4–1	—	1–0	0–1	1–1	0–6	5–2	1–5
Oldham Curzon	1–4	3–2	3–3	4–0	0–0	3–3	—	1–1	5–2	1–9	0–1	2–3
Sheffield Wednesday	3–3	1–1	0–0	1–2	1–1	0–4	2–1	—	1–1	0–1	2–0	1–3
Stockport County	2–2	2–2	2–1	4–1	3–0	4–0	0–1	1–1	—	2–2	2–2	1–0
Sunderland	2–1	2–3	4–2	5–2	1–0	2–0	1–0	3–0	5–1	—	3–0	1–1
Tranmere Rovers	1–0	2–4	5–0	2–3	2–1	1–0	2–1	1–2	1–1	1–2	—	1–1
Wolverhampton Wanderers	2–1	0–2	3–0	5–1	1–0	2–0	1–1	2–0	1–0	1–2	2–0	—

Source: FA WPL
Legend: Blue = home team win; Yellow = draw; Red = away team win.

=== Top goalscorers ===
Rank	Player	Team	Goals
1	(Northern Ireland) Amy McCann	(England) Wolverhampton Wanderers	20
2	(England) Andrea Bell	(England) Blackburn Rovers	16
2	(England) Steph Houghton	(England) Sunderland	16
2	(England) Melanie Reay	(England) Sunderland	16
5	(England) Sara Priestly	(England) Lincoln City	14

== Southern Division ==
FA Women's Premier League Southern Division
- Season: 2004–05
- Champions: Chelsea
- Promoted: Chelsea
- Relegated: Enfield Town; Ipswich Town
- UEFA Cup: Cardiff City
- Matches: 132
- Goals: 491 (3.72 per match)
- Top goalscorer: Emma Mead (20 goals); Nina Downham (20 goals)
- Biggest home win: Chelsea 10–0 Enfield Town (27 March 2005)
- Biggest away win: Ipswich Town 0–7 AFC Wimbledon (10 October 2004)
- Highest scoring: Chelsea 10–2 Ipswich Town (19 September 2004)

Map showing the locations of the teams in the Southern Division of the FA Women's Premier League
Map showing the locations of the teams in the Southern Division of the FA Women's Premier League

The Southern Division season began on 15 August 2004 and ended on 24 April 2005. Cardiff City qualified for the European Cup by winning the Welsh Women's Cup.

Changes from last season:

- Bristol City were promoted to the National Division
- Crystal Palace were promoted from the South East Combination League
- Cardiff City were promoted from the South West Combination League
- Barnet were relegated to the South East Combination League
- Merthyr Tydfil were relegated to the South West Combination League

=== League table ===
Pos	Team	Pld	W	D	L	GF	GA	GD	Pts	Promotion or relegation
1	Chelsea (C, P)	22	16	4	2	72	25	+47	52	Promotion to the National Division
2	Portsmouth	22	13	5	4	42	26	+16	44	
3	Brighton & Hove Albion	22	11	3	8	59	43	+16	36	
4	Crystal Palace	22	10	6	6	36	25	+11	36	
5	AFC Wimbledon	22	11	2	9	51	32	+19	35	
6	Millwall Lionesses	22	9	8	5	37	33	+4	35	
7	Cardiff City	22	9	7	6	41	30	+11	34	Qualification for the UEFA Cup qualifying round
8	Southampton Saints	22	7	6	9	39	40	−1	27	
9	Watford	22	7	6	9	38	40	−2	27	
10	Langford	22	6	5	11	28	52	−24	23	
11	Enfield Town (R)	22	1	6	15	20	61	−41	9	Relegation to the South East Combination League
12	Ipswich Town (R)	22	2	2	18	28	84	−56	8	Relegation to the South East Combination League

Source: FA WPL
(C) Champions; (P) Promoted; (R) Relegated

=== Results ===
Home \ Away	WIM	BHA	CAR	CHE	CRY	ENT	IPT	LAN	MIL	POR	SOU	WAT
AFC Wimbledon	—	0–3	0–3	1–2	1–5	4–0	3–1	6–0	2–0	0–2	1–2	4–0
Brighton & Hove Albion	3–1	—	2–3	0–6	2–2	5–1	7–1	3–1	3–0	2–3	3–3	0–2
Cardiff City	2–0	2–1	—	1–2	3–0	3–1	0–2	1–1	2–2	2–1	1–1	3–4
Chelsea	1–1	0–2	1–1	—	0–1	10–0	10–2	4–1	4–0	6–3	4–2	5–0
Crystal Palace	1–3	3–1	2–2	0–1	—	2–0	3–0	5–0	1–2	0–2	2–0	2–1
Enfield Town	2–7	1–2	1–3	1–2	1–1	—	3–1	1–1	0–3	2–2	1–2	0–3
Ipswich Town	0–7	4–5	0–0	1–2	0–1	0–0	—	6–1	1–4	1–5	1–4	0–4
Langford	1–2	1–5	1–0	2–3	1–1	2–1	4–3	—	2–0	1–2	2–1	1–1
Millwall Lionesses	1–1	3–3	3–2	2–2	1–1	2–1	2–0	4–1	—	1–1	1–1	2–2
Portsmouth	1–0	2–1	4–2	0–2	1–1	1–1	6–1	2–1	0–1	—	1–0	0–0
Southampton Saints	2–3	3–2	0–4	2–2	0–1	1–1	6–2	1–3	2–1	1–2	—	3–0
Watford	0–4	1–4	1–1	2–3	3–1	4–1	7–1	0–0	1–2	0–1	2–2	—

Source: FA WPL
Legend: Blue = home team win; Yellow = draw; Red = away team win.

=== Top goalscorers ===
Rank	Player	Team	Goals
1	(England) Emma Mead	(England) Brighton & Hove Albion	22
1	(England) Nina Downham	(England) Chelsea	22
3	(Republic of Ireland) Sophie Perry	(England) Brighton & Hove Albion	19
4	(Wales) Helen Ward	(England) Watford	14
5	(England) Kelly Townshend	(England) Enfield Town	12
