= 2005–06 FA Women's Premier League =

FA Women's Premier League
- Season: 2005–06

The 2005–06 FA Women's Premier League season was the 15th season of the FA Women's Premier League.

== National Division ==
FA Women's Premier League National Division
- Season: 2005–06
- Champions: Arsenal; 9th title
- UEFA Cup: Arsenal
- Matches: 90
- Goals: 340 (3.78 per match)
- Top goalscorer: Kelly Smith (18 goals)
- Biggest home win: Charlton Athletic 8–0 Sunderland (27 November 2005)
- Biggest away win: Birmingham City 0–7 Arsenal (13 November 2005)

Locations of the FA Women's Premier League National Division Teams
Locations of the FA Women's Premier League National Division Teams (Greater London)

The season started on 14 August 2005 and ended on 14 May 2006. Arsenal were the defending champions, while Sunderland and Chelsea entered as the promoted teams from the 2004–05 Northern and Southern Divisions. Bristol Rovers changed their name to Bristol Academy to reflect the added investment and commitment of the Bristol Academy of Sport. Arsenal won their third consecutive league title, and eight overall. The National Division was expanded from 10 to 12 clubs ahead of the 2006–07 season.

Changes from last season:

- Sunderland were promoted from the Northern Division
- Chelsea were promoted from the Southern Division
- Liverpool were relegated to the Northern Division
- Bristol City were relegated to the Southern Division
- Bristol Rovers became Bristol Academy

=== League table ===
Pos	Team	Pld	W	D	L	GF	GA	GD	Pts	Qualification or relegation
1	Arsenal (C)	18	16	2	0	83	20	+63	50	Qualification for the UEFA Cup qualifying round
2	Everton	18	14	2	2	46	20	+26	44	
3	Charlton Athletic	18	12	3	3	41	13	+28	39	
4	Doncaster Rovers Belles	18	7	2	9	32	34	−2	23	
5	Bristol Academy	18	4	8	6	19	29	−10	20	
6	Birmingham City	18	6	2	10	24	40	−16	20	
7	Leeds United	18	4	6	8	27	36	−9	18	
8	Fulham	18	4	2	12	24	45	−21	14	
9	Sunderland (O)	18	3	4	11	22	57	−35	13	Qualification for relegation playoffs
10	Chelsea (O)	18	3	3	12	22	46	−24	12	Qualification for relegation playoffs

Source: FA WPL
(C) Champions; (O) Play-off winners

=== Results ===
Home \ Away	ARS	BIR	BRI	CHA	CHE	DON	EVE	FUL	LEE	SUN
Arsenal	—	4–2	5–1	2–0	6–0	4–0	5–0	5–1	4–3	7–0
Birmingham City	0–7	—	0–3	1–0	2–4	0–2	1–3	1–0	3–3	2–0
Bristol Academy	1–5	1–1	—	0–0	2–0	1–6	0–0	1–0	3–1	1–1
Charlton Athletic	3–3	1–0	2–1	—	4–1	1–0	1–0	2–1	2–0	8–0
Chelsea	0–2	1–4	0–0	1–2	—	1–2	1–2	0–2	2–3	4–3
Doncaster Rovers Belles	3–5	4–1	0–0	1–2	3–2	—	0–3	1–0	0–0	1–3
Everton	3–3	3–1	2–0	1–0	5–0	3–1	—	5–2	2–1	4–0
Fulham	1–6	3–1	1–1	0–6	1–2	2–5	2–3	—	0–1	4–2
Leeds United	1–4	0–2	2–2	1–1	1–2	3–1	2–4	2–1	—	1–1
Sunderland	1–6	1–2	3–1	0–6	1–1	3–2	0–3	1–2	2–2	—

Source: FA WPL
Legend: Blue = home team win; Yellow = draw; Red = away team win.

=== Playoffs ===
National Division	1st leg	2nd leg	Regional Division Runners-Up
Sunderland (9th place National Division)	1–3	4–2	Bristol City (2nd place Southern Division)
Chelsea (10th place National Division)	3–0	1–1	Liverpool (2nd place Northern Division)

No relegations.

=== Top goalscorers ===
As of 14 May 2006.

Rank	Player	Team	Goals
1	(England) Kelly Smith	(England) Arsenal	18
2	(England) Lianne Sanderson	(England) Arsenal	17
3	(England) Jody Handley	(England) Everton	12
3	(Wales) Jayne Ludlow	(England) Arsenal	12
5	(England) Eniola Aluko	(England) Charlton Athletic	11

== Northern Division ==
FA Women's Premier League Northern Division
- Season: 2005–06
- Champions: Blackburn Rovers
- Promoted: Blackburn Rovers
- Relegated: Middlesbrough
- Matches: 132
- Goals: 590 (4.47 per match)
- Top goalscorer: Vicky Abbott (21 goals)
- Biggest home win: Lincoln City 7–0 Curzon Ashton (6 November 2005)
- Biggest away win: Curzon Ashton 1–6 Blackburn Rovers (5 October 2005)
- Highest scoring: Curzon Ashton 2–6 Newcastle United (4 September 2005)

Map showing the locations of the teams in the Northern Division of the FA Women's Premier League
Map showing the locations of the teams in the Northern Division of the FA Women's Premier League

The season started on 14 August 2005 and ended on 14 May 2006.

Changes from last season:

- Sunderland were promoted to the National Division
- Nottingham Forest were promoted from the Midland Combination League
- Newcastle United were promoted from the Northern Combination League
- Liverpool were relegated from the National Division
- Sheffield Wednesday were relegated to the Northern Combination League
- Coventry City were relegated to the Midland Combination League
- Oldham Curzon became Curzon Ashton

=== League table ===
Pos	Team	Pld	W	D	L	GF	GA	GD	Pts	Promotion or relegation
1	Blackburn Rovers (C, P)	22	20	2	0	55	12	+43	62	Promotion to the National Division
2	Liverpool	22	15	3	4	39	17	+22	48	Qualification for the relegation playoffs
3	Tranmere Rovers	22	13	4	5	41	29	+12	43	
4	Lincoln City	22	11	3	8	40	31	+9	36	
5	Nottingham Forest	22	8	6	8	33	30	+3	30	
6	Wolverhampton Wanderers	22	6	10	6	29	33	−4	28	
7	Aston Villa	22	8	2	12	33	38	−5	26	
8	Newcastle United	22	6	7	9	32	33	−1	25	
9	Stockport County	22	5	7	10	24	31	−7	22	
10	Curzon Ashton	22	4	6	12	27	64	−37	18	
11	Manchester City	22	3	7	12	19	31	−12	16	
12	Middlesbrough (R)	22	3	3	16	18	41	−23	12	Relegation to the Northern Combination League

Source: FA WPL
(C) Champions; (P) Promoted; (R) Relegated

=== Results ===
Home \ Away	ASV	BLR	CUA	LIC	LIV	MCI	MID	NEU	NOF	STC	TRR	WOW
Aston Villa	—	1–2	5–2	0–2	0–1	1–0	1–1	0–1	4–3	2–0	1–2	2–2
Blackburn Rovers	3–0	—	1–0	2–0	0–0	2–0	1–0	3–0	1–0	3–1	5–1	5–2
Curzon Ashton	1–5	1–6	—	0–4	1–1	1–1	3–2	2–6	2–1	2–2	0–4	0–1
Lincoln City	2–1	0–3	7–0	—	0–2	1–1	2–1	3–1	1–1	1–1	1–3	5–2
Liverpool	2–0	0–0	2–0	4–1	—	3–2	2–1	1–0	1–2	4–2	3–0	0–1
Manchester City	1–2	0–1	0–1	0–2	0–3	—	1–2	1–2	0–0	2–1	0–1	1–0
Middlesbrough	0–1	0–1	2–4	1–0	0–2	1–1	—	1–3	0–1	1–2	0–2	0–3
Newcastle United	4–1	3–4	2–2	0–1	0–1	2–2	1–3	—	3–1	1–1	0–1	1–1
Nottingham Forest	4–1	1–3	4–1	2–1	1–1	3–1	3–1	1–1	—	1–0	2–3	1–1
Stockport County	0–2	0–1	4–0	3–1	1–3	1–1	1–0	0–0	1–0	—	1–2	0–0
Tranmere Rovers	3–2	1–1	2–2	1–2	2–0	1–4	5–0	1–1	2–0	2–0	—	1–1
Wolverhampton Wanderers	2–1	0–4	2–2	2–3	0–2	0–0	1–1	2–0	1–1	2–2	3–1	—

Source: FA WPL
Legend: Blue = home team win; Yellow = draw; Red = away team win.

=== Top goalscorers ===
As of 14 May 2006.

Rank	Player	Team	Goals
1	(England) Vicky Abbott	(England) Tranmere Rovers	21
2	(England) Katie Anderton	(England) Blackburn Rovers	18
3	(England) Stacey Aisthorpe	(England) Lincoln City	13
4	(England) Natalie Clarke	(England) Nottingham Forest	12
5	(Wales) Jade Thomas	(England) Liverpool	10

== Southern Division ==
FA Women's Premier League Southern Division
- Season: 2005–06
- Champions: Cardiff City
- Promoted: Cardiff City
- Relegated: Langford
- UEFA Cup: Cardiff City
- Matches: 132
- Goals: 507 (3.84 per match)
- Top goalscorer: Helen Ward
- Biggest home win: Cardiff City 9–0 AFC Wimbledon (1 May 2006)
- Biggest away win: Portsmouth 0–6 Millwall Lionesses (22 January 2006)
- Highest scoring: Brighton & Hove Albion 3–7 Watford (13 November 2005)

Map showing the locations of the teams in the Southern Division of the FA Women's Premier League
Map showing the locations of the teams in the Southern Division of the FA Women's Premier League

The season started on 14 August 2005 and ended on 7 May 2006. Reading Royals were affiliated with Reading until May 2006. Cardiff City qualified for the European Cup by winning the Welsh Women's Cup.

Changes from last season:

- Chelsea were promoted to the National Division
- West Ham United were promoted from the South East Combination League
- Reading Royals were promoted from the South West Combination League
- Bristol City were relegated from the National Division
- Enfield Town were relegated to the South East Combination League
- Ipswich Town were relegated to the South East Combination League

Promotions and relegations from 2004–05
Team	Previous league	Moved to
Chelsea	Southern Division	National Division
West Ham United	South East Combination League	Southern Division
Reading Royals	South West Combination League	Southern Division
Bristol City	National Division	Southern Division
Enfield Town	Southern Division	South East Combination League
Ipswich Town	Southern Division	South East Combination League

Pos	Team	Pld	W	D	L	GF	GA	GD	Pts	Promotion or relegation
1	Cardiff City (C, P)	22	14	7	1	53	17	+36	49	Promotion to the National Division, Qualification for the UEFA Cup qualifying round
2	Bristol City	22	16	1	5	51	30	+21	49	Qualification for the relegation playoffs
3	Watford	22	14	5	3	59	28	+31	47	
4	Portsmouth	22	12	4	6	58	39	+19	40	
5	Millwall Lionesses	22	11	5	6	51	31	+20	38	
6	West Ham United	22	8	4	10	31	33	−2	28	
7	AFC Wimbledon	22	8	3	11	39	52	−13	27	
8	Reading Royals	22	7	2	13	34	42	−8	23	
9	Crystal Palace	22	7	1	14	38	52	−14	22	
10	Southampton Saints	22	6	0	16	30	70	−40	18	
11	Brighton & Hove Albion	22	4	5	13	33	53	−20	17	
12	Langford (R)	22	4	5	13	30	60	−30	17	Relegation to the South East Combination League

Source: FA WPL
(C) Champions; (P) Promoted; (R) Relegated

=== Results ===
Home \ Away	WIM	BHA	BRC	CAR	CRP	LAN	MIL	POR	REA	SOU	WAT	WHU
AFC Wimbledon	—	3–0	0–2	0–4	6–1	3–1	3–1	2–5	4–1	1–2	2–1	0–4
Brighton & Hove Albion	2–0	—	3–1	1–1	2–0	2–3	0–3	1–3	0–0	4–5	3–7	1–2
Bristol City	2–1	2–0	—	1–2	4–3	2–1	1–2	3–3	0–2	3–1	1–0	5–1
Cardiff City	9–0	1–1	3–0	—	2–1	7–1	1–1	2–1	2–1	3–0	0–1	0–0
Crystal Palace	3–4	3–1	2–4	1–2	—	2–1	3–1	1–4	2–1	0–2	3–5	1–0
Langford	1–1	2–3	0–2	2–3	1–1	—	2–0	1–3	3–1	4–3	2–2	1–1
Millwall Lionesses	1–1	2–2	2–3	1–1	3–2	4–0	—	3–5	2–0	7–1	0–3	3–0
Portsmouth	2–2	4–1	1–3	0–4	3–2	2–2	0–6	—	5–0	6–0	1–1	3–1
Reading Royals	3–0	4–2	0–3	2–3	3–0	4–1	1–2	2–1	—	1–3	1–3	0–1
Southampton Saints	2–4	2–1	1–4	1–2	1–5	3–1	0–3	0–3	1–4	—	1–3	1–5
Watford	3–1	4–2	2–3	1–1	1–0	7–0	1–1	1–0	3–3	4–0	—	2–1
West Ham United	2–1	1–1	0–2	0–0	1–2	4–0	1–3	1–3	1–0	2–0	2–4	—

Source: FA WPL
Legend: Blue = home team win; Yellow = draw; Red = away team win.

=== Top goalscorers ===
As of 7 May 2006.

Rank	Player	Team	Goals
1	(Wales) Helen Ward	(England) Watford	30
2	(England) Claire Williams	(England) Millwall Lionesses	16
3	(England) Charley Wilson	(England) Portsmouth	15
4	(Wales) Gwennan Harries	(Wales) Cardiff City	13
5	(England) Julie Bygrave	(England) AFC Wimbledon	12
