= 2020–21 FA Women's National League =

FA Women's National League
- Season: 2020–21
- Champions: not awarded
- Promoted: Sunderland (awarded); Watford (awarded)
- Relegated: none

The 2020–21 FA Women's National League was the 30th season of the competition, and the third since a restructure and rebranding of the top four tiers of English football by The Football Association. Starting in 1992, it was previously known as the FA Women's Premier League. It sits at the third and fourth levels of the women's football pyramid, below the FA Women's Championship and above the eight regional football leagues.

The league featured six regional divisions: the Northern and Southern divisions at level three of the pyramid, and below those Division One North, Division One Midlands, Division One South East, and Division One South West. The league consisted of 71 teams, divided into six divisions of twelve teams apart from Division One South West which contains 11 teams. At the end of the season the winners of the Northern and Southern Premier divisions would have both qualified for a play-off match to decide the overall National League champion. Both teams were due be promoted to the FA Women's Championship.

On 4 January 2021, the National League was suspended due to the ongoing COVID-19 pandemic and national lockdown. On 15 March, all tiers of the National League were curtailed for a second consecutive season. Although there was no promotion and relegation between the tiers, including promotion from tier 3 into tier 2 and relegation from tier 6 into tier 7, an alternative method of upward club movement via application and based on set criteria was suggested in order to support the stability and integrity of the women's football pyramid. All clubs from tiers 3 to 6 were eligible to apply to move into the league immediately one tier above where they currently played with applications marked against a criterion weighted 75% on-field and 25% off-field. As a result, Sunderland and Watford were awarded promotion to the FA Women's Championship ahead of the 2021–22 season.

== Premier Division ==
=== Northern Premier Division ===
FA Women's National League Northern Premier Division
- Season: 2020–21
- Champions: N/A
- Promoted: Sunderland
- Relegated: N/A

Map showing the locations of the teams in the Northern Division of the FA Women's National League

Changes from last season:

- Following the curtailment of the 2019–20 season amid the COVID-19 pandemic in June 2020, it was decided there would be no promotion or relegation in the National League.

Club	Home ground	Position 2019–20
AFC Fylde	Mill Farm, Wesham	9th
Burnley	Arbories Memorial Sports Ground, Padiham	5th
Derby County	The Don Amott Arena, Derby	2nd
Huddersfield Town	The Stafflex Arena, Kirkburton	6th
Hull City	Dransfield Stadium, North Ferriby	11th
Loughborough Foxes	Loughborough University Stadium, Loughborough	10th
Middlesbrough	Bedford Terrace, Billingham	8th
Nottingham Forest	Eastwood CFC, Eastwood	3rd
Sheffield	Home of Football Ground, Dronfield	12th
Stoke City	Clayton Wood, Stoke-on-Trent	4th
Sunderland	Eppleton Colliery Welfare Ground, Hetton-le-Hole	1st
West Bromwich Albion	Walsall Wood, Walsall	7th

==== League table ====
Pos	Team	Pld	W	D	L	GF	GA	GD	Pts	Qualification
1	Huddersfield Town	10	8	1	1	31	15	+16	25	
2	AFC Fylde	8	6	1	1	29	11	+18	19	
3	West Bromwich Albion	9	5	1	3	24	14	+10	16	
4	Derby County	9	5	1	3	27	20	+7	16	
5	Sunderland (P)	9	5	0	4	17	17	0	15	Promotion to the Championship
6	Nottingham Forest	9	4	2	3	22	12	+10	14	
7	Stoke City	8	3	2	3	15	22	−7	11	
8	Burnley	7	3	1	3	11	11	0	10	
9	Middlesbrough	9	2	1	6	15	24	−9	7	
10	Sheffield	9	2	0	7	11	29	−18	6	
11	Hull City	7	1	2	4	9	17	−8	5	
12	Loughborough Foxes	8	0	2	6	8	27	−19	2	

Source: The Football Association
Rules for classification: 1) Points; 2) Goal difference; 3) Number of goals scored
(P) Promoted

=== Southern Premier Division ===
FA Women's National League Southern Premier Division
- Season: 2020–21
- Champions: N/A
- Promoted: Watford
- Relegated: N/A

Map showing the locations of the teams in the Southern Division of the FA Women's National League

Changes from last season:

- Following the curtailment of the 2019–20 season amid the COVID-19 pandemic in June 2020, it was decided there would be no promotion or relegation in the National League.
- Chichester City were renamed Chichester & Selsey Ladies after dropping their affiliation to Chichester City F.C.
- Gillingham L.F.C. were renamed Gillingham W.F.C. after losing their affiliation to Gillingham F.C. during a club restructure
- Yeovil Town rebranded Yeovil United

Club	Home ground	Position 2019–20
Cardiff City	CCB Centre for Sporting Excellence, Ystrad Mynach	6th
Chichester & Selsey	The High Street Ground, Selsey	12th (as Chichester City)
Crawley Wasps	The New Defence, Horley	1st
Gillingham	Maidstone Road Sports Ground, Chatham	9th
Hounslow	Honeycroft, West Drayton	11th
Keynsham Town	The AJN Stadium, Keynsham	10th
MK Dons	Stadium MK, Milton Keynes	8th
Oxford United	Marsh Lane, Marston	3rd
Plymouth Argyle	Manadon Sports Hub, Plymouth	4th
Portsmouth	Westleigh Park, Havant	7th
Watford	CRY Community Stadium, Kings Langley	2nd
Yeovil United	Huish Park, Yeovil	5th

==== League table ====
Pos	Team	Pld	W	D	L	GF	GA	GD	Pts	Qualification
1	Watford (P)	8	6	1	1	28	6	+22	19	Promotion to the Championship
2	Oxford United	7	6	0	1	22	6	+16	18	
3	Portsmouth	8	5	1	2	21	8	+13	16	
4	Milton Keynes Dons	8	5	0	3	23	11	+12	15	
5	Crawley Wasps	7	5	0	2	14	5	+9	15	
6	Cardiff City Ladies	4	3	0	1	17	6	+11	9	
7	Chichester & Selsey	6	3	0	3	14	10	+4	9	
8	Yeovil United	5	2	2	1	9	8	+1	8	
9	Keynsham Town	7	2	0	5	13	15	−2	6	
10	Gillingham	7	2	0	5	10	14	−4	6	
11	Plymouth Argyle	7	0	0	7	2	42	−40	0	
12	Hounslow	8	0	0	8	0	42	−42	0	

Source: The Football Association
Rules for classification: 1) Points; 2) Goal difference; 3) Number of goals scored
(P) Promoted

== Division One ==
=== Division One North ===
FA Women's National League Division One North
- Season: 2020–21
- Champions: N/A
- Promoted: N/A
- Relegated: N/A

Map showing the locations of the teams in the Division One North of the FA Women's National League

Changes from last season:

- Following the curtailment of the 2019–20 season amid the COVID-19 pandemic in June 2020, it was decided there would be no promotion or relegation in the National League.
- Bolton Wanderers reverted to their original name of Bolton Ladies after dropping their affiliation to Bolton Wanderers F.C.

Club	Home ground	Position 2019–20
Barnsley	Barnsley FC Academy, Barnsley	1st
Bolton Ladies	Kensite Stadium, Atherton	9th (as Bolton Wanderers)
Bradford City	Plumpton Park, Bradford	12th
Brighouse Town	The Yorkshire Payments Stadium, Brighouse	3rd
Chester-le-Street	Moor Park, Chester Moor	7th
Chorley	Victory Park Stadium, Chorley	11th
Durham Cestria	The Graham Sports Centre, Durham	5th
Leeds United	Thorp Arch, Wetherby	2nd
Liverpool Feds	I.M. Marsh Campus, Liverpool	4th
Newcastle United	Druid Park, Newcastle upon Tyne	6th
Norton & Stockton Ancients	Norton Teesside Sports Complex, Stockton-on-Tees	8th
Stockport County	Stockport Sports Village, Stockport	10th

==== League table ====
Pos	Team	Pld	W	D	L	GF	GA	GD	Pts
1	Chester-le-Street	6	4	2	0	15	7	+8	14
2	Brighouse Town	5	3	1	1	9	3	+6	10
3	Norton & Stockton Ancients	6	2	2	2	9	8	+1	8
4	Leeds United	6	2	2	2	8	8	0	8
5	Durham Cestria	5	2	1	2	10	8	+2	7
6	Liverpool Feds	3	2	0	1	4	2	+2	6
7	Stockport County	4	2	0	2	8	7	+1	6
8	Newcastle United	3	1	1	1	3	3	0	4
9	Barnsley	6	1	1	4	10	12	−2	4
10	Chorley	3	1	1	1	1	4	−3	4
11	Bradford City	4	0	3	1	4	5	−1	3
12	Bolton	3	0	0	3	2	16	−14	0

Source: The Football Association
Rules for classification: 1) Points; 2) Goal difference; 3) Number of goals scored

=== Division One Midlands ===
FA Women's National League Division One Midlands
- Season: 2020–21
- Champions: N/A
- Promoted: N/A
- Relegated: N/A

Map showing the locations of the teams in Division One Midlands of the FA Women's National League

Changes from last season:

- Following the curtailment of the 2019–20 season amid the COVID-19 pandemic in June 2020, it was decided there would be no promotion or relegation in the National League.
- Birmingham & West Midlands were renamed Boldmere St. Michaels after merging with Boldmere St. Michaels F.C.
- Leicester United were renamed Holwell Sports after merging with Holwell Sports F.C.
- The New Saints (TNS) were renamed Wem Town after TNS announced the decision to fold their women's side and the team re-affiliated with Wem Town F.C.

Club	Home ground	Position 2019–20
Bedworth United	The Oval, Bedworth	3rd
Boldmere St. Michaels	Trevor Brown Memorial Ground, Sutton Coldfield	2nd (as Birmingham & West Midlands)
Burton Albion	The Lamb Ground, Tamworth	12th
Doncaster Rovers Belles	Oxford Street, Rossington	10th
Holwell Sports	Welby Road, Asfordby Hill	7th (as Leicester United)
Leafield Athletic	Stockingford Pavilion, Nuneaton	9th
Lincoln City	Active Nation, Yarborough, Lincoln	5th
Long Eaton United	Grange Park, Long Eaton	6th
Solihull Moors	West Midland Sports & Social Club, Birmingham	11th
Sporting Khalsa	The Aspray Arena, Willenhall	8th
Wem Town	Butler Sports Centre, Wem	4th (as TNS)
Wolverhampton Wanderers	CKW Stadium, Castlecroft, Wolverhampton	1st

==== League table ====
Pos	Team	Pld	W	D	L	GF	GA	GD	Pts
1	Wolverhampton Wanderers	6	6	0	0	37	3	+34	18
2	Doncaster Rovers Belles	8	4	3	1	20	12	+8	15
3	Lincoln City	6	4	1	1	27	8	+19	13
4	Solihull Moors	6	3	2	1	20	11	+9	11
5	Long Eaton United	7	3	2	2	15	9	+6	11
6	Boldmere St. Michaels	4	3	1	0	16	4	+12	10
7	Sporting Khalsa	6	2	2	2	9	11	−2	8
8	Bedworth United	7	2	0	5	8	18	−10	6
9	Wem Town	4	1	1	2	4	10	−6	4
10	Holwell Sports	6	1	1	4	9	18	−9	4
11	Burton Albion	7	1	0	6	6	47	−41	3
12	Leafield Athletic	7	0	1	6	6	26	−20	1

Source: The Football Association
Rules for classification: 1) Points; 2) Goal difference; 3) Number of goals scored

=== Division One South East ===
FA Women's National League Division One South East
- Season: 2020–21
- Champions: N/A
- Promoted: N/A
- Relegated: N/A

Map showing the locations of the teams in Division One South East of the FA Women's National League

Changes from last season:

- Following the curtailment of the 2019–20 season amid the COVID-19 pandemic in June 2020, it was decided there would be no promotion or relegation in the National League.
- AFC Basildon were renamed Hashtag United after merging with Hashtag United F.C.

Club	Home ground	Position 2019–20
Actonians	Rectory Park, Northolt	7th
AFC Wimbledon	War Memorial Sports Ground, Sutton	2nd
Billericay Town	AGP Arena, Billericay	4th
Cambridge City	The Ellgia Stadium, Ely	11th
Cambridge United	Recreation Way, Mildenhall	8th
Enfield Town	Queen Elizabeth II Stadium, Enfield	6th
Hashtag United	Park Lane, Canvey Island	3rd (as AFC Basildon)
Ipswich Town	The Goldstar Ground, Felixstowe	1st
Kent Football United	Glentworth Sports Club, Kent	12th
Leyton Orient	Mile End Stadium, Bow, London	5th
Norwich City	Plantation Park, Blofield	9th
Stevenage	Hertingfordbury Park, Hertford	10th

==== League table ====
Pos	Team	Pld	W	D	L	GF	GA	GD	Pts
1	Ipswich Town	4	4	0	0	18	0	+18	12
2	Hashtag United	5	4	0	1	16	7	+9	12
3	Enfield Town	6	3	2	1	12	5	+7	11
4	Actonians	4	3	1	0	9	2	+7	10
5	Norwich City	4	3	0	1	10	7	+3	9
6	AFC Wimbledon	5	2	1	2	13	9	+4	7
7	Cambridge United	6	2	1	3	10	20	−10	7
8	Kent Football United	6	1	3	2	7	8	−1	6
9	Leyton Orient	3	1	1	1	5	4	+1	4
10	Cambridge City	7	1	1	5	10	24	−14	4
11	Billericay Town	3	1	0	2	7	7	0	3
12	Stevenage	7	0	0	7	1	25	−24	0

Source: The Football Association
Rules for classification: 1) Points; 2) Goal difference; 3) Number of goals scored

=== Division One South West ===
FA Women's National League Division One South West
- Season: 2020–21
- Champions: N/A
- Promoted: N/A
- Relegated: N/A

Map showing the locations of the teams in Division One South West of the FA Women's National League

Changes from last season:

- Following the curtailment of the 2019–20 season amid the COVID-19 pandemic in June 2020, it was decided there would be no promotion or relegation in the National League.

Club	Home ground	Position 2019–20
Brislington	Brislington Stadium, Brislington	8th
Buckland Athletic	Homers Heath, Newton Abbot	7th
Cheltenham Town	Petersfield Park, Cheltenham	4th
Chesham United	The Meadow, Chesham	5th
Exeter City	Clifford Hill Training Ground,	3rd
Larkhall Athletic	Plain Ham, Larkhall	6th
Maidenhead United	York Road Stadium, Maidenhead	9th
Poole Town	Dorset County F.A. County Ground, Poole	10th
Southampton	Testwood Stadium, Totton	1st
Southampton Women	Gang Warily Recreation Ground, Southampton	2nd
Swindon Town	Cinder Lane, Fairford	11th

==== League table ====
Pos	Team	Pld	W	D	L	GF	GA	GD	Pts
1	Southampton	4	4	0	0	19	2	+17	12
2	Chesham United	5	4	0	1	23	8	+15	12
3	Swindon Town	4	3	0	1	13	8	+5	9
4	Buckland Athletic	5	3	0	2	11	12	−1	9
5	Exeter City	6	2	2	2	16	18	−2	8
6	Cheltenham Town	5	2	1	2	12	8	+4	7
7	Larkhall Athletic	5	1	3	1	15	15	0	6
8	Maidenhead United	3	1	1	1	6	6	0	4
9	Southampton Women	4	1	1	2	8	9	−1	4
10	Brislington	3	0	0	3	3	16	−13	0
11	Poole Town	6	0	0	6	4	28	−24	0

Source: The Football Association
Rules for classification: 1) Points; 2) Goal difference; 3) Number of goals scored

== See also ==
- 2020–21 FA WSL (tier 1)
- 2020–21 FA Women's Championship (tier 2)
