= Northern Combination Women's Football League =

- Founded: 1998
- Folded: 2014
- Country: England
- Divisions: 1
- Number of clubs: 12
- Level on pyramid: 4
- Feeder to: FA Women's Premier League Northern Division
- Relegation to: North West Women's Regional Football League; North East Regional Women's Football League
- Last champions: Huddersfield Town (2013–14)
- Most championships: Newcastle United
- Website: Official website

The Northern Combination Women's Football League, also known simply as the Northern Combination, was a women's football league in England from 1998 to 2014. Until the creation of the FA Women's Super League in 2011, they sat at the third level of English women's football pyramid along with the three other Combination Leagues – South West, South East and Midland. The Northern Combination fed into the FA Women's Premier League Northern Division, and lied above the North West Women's Regional Football League and the North East Regional Women's Football League in the pyramid. For the 2014–15 season the Midland Combination was incorporated into the newly re-structured FA Women's Premier League as the FA WPL Northern Division One.

== Clubs for 2013–14 season ==
Club	Finishing position 2012–13	Finishing position 2013–14
Cheadle Heath Nomads	11th	11th
Chester le Street Town	1st in North East	7th
Chorley	2nd	2nd
Huddersfield Town	6th	1st
Leeds City Vixens	8th	9th
Liverpool Feds	10th	8th
Middlesbrough FC Ladies	4th	6th
Mossley Hill	9th	3rd
Sheffield United Community	5th	10th
Stockport County	7th	5th
Tranmere Rovers	1st in North West	4th
Wakefield	12th	12th

== Previous winners ==
Season	Winner
1998–99	Bangor City
1999–00	Oldham Curzon
2000–01	Manchester City
2001–02	Middlesbrough
2002–03	Stockport County
2003–04	Blackburn Rovers
2004–05	Newcastle United
2005–06	Preston North End
2006–07	Sheffield Wednesday
2007–08	Curzon Ashton
2008–09	Leeds City Vixens
2009–10	Rochdale
2010–11	Sheffield
2011–12	Newcastle United
2012–13	South Durham & Cestria
2013–14	Huddersfield Town
