= 2001–02 FA Women's Premier League =

FA Women's Premier League
- Season: 2001–02

The 2001–02 FA Women's Premier League season was the 11th season of the FA Women's Premier League.

== National Division ==
FA Women's Premier League National Division
- Season: 2001–02
- Champions: Arsenal; 5th title
- Relegated: Barry Town; Sunderland
- UEFA Cup: Arsenal
- Matches: 90
- Goals: 326 (3.62 per match)
- Biggest home win: Arsenal 10–2 Leeds United (11 May 2002)
- Biggest away win: Brighton & Hove Albion 0–8 Doncaster Belles (14 October 2001)

Locations of the FA Women's Premier League National Division Teams
Locations of the FA Women's Premier League National Division Teams (Greater London)

Changes from last season:

- Leeds United were promoted from the Northern Division
- Brighton & Hove Albion were promoted from the Southern Division
- Liverpool were relegated to the Northern Division
- Millwall Lionesses were relegated to the Southern Division

=== League table ===
Pos	Team	Pld	W	D	L	GF	GA	GD	Pts	Qualification or relegation
1	Arsenal (C)	18	16	1	1	60	15	+45	49	Qualification for the UEFA Cup qualifying round
2	Doncaster Belles	18	13	2	3	57	21	+36	41	
3	Charlton Athletic	18	10	1	7	40	24	+16	31	
4	Leeds United	18	7	5	6	36	37	−1	26	
5	Everton	18	8	2	8	30	31	−1	26	
6	Tranmere Rovers	18	7	3	8	31	36	−5	24	
7	Brighton & Hove Albion	18	7	3	8	19	33	−14	24	
8	Southampton Saints	18	5	3	10	19	34	−15	18	
9	Barry Town (R)	18	2	3	13	19	49	−30	9	Relegation to the Southern Division
10	Sunderland (R)	18	1	5	12	15	46	−31	8	Relegation to the Northern Division

Source: FA WPL
(C) Champions; (R) Relegated

=== Results ===
Home \ Away	ARS	BAR	BRI	CHA	DON	EVE	LEE	SOU	SUN	TRA
Arsenal	—	6–0	3–0	3–1	4–1	4–2	10–2	3–1	4–1	2–0
Barry Town	0–1	—	2–1	1–2	1–3	3–3	1–3	1–2	2–2	1–2
Brighton & Hove Albion	0–0	1–1	—	3–0	0–8	0–1	2–1	3–0	1–0	1–0
Charlton Athletic	0–3	5–2	5–1	—	3–4	2–1	0–1	0–1	7–0	2–0
Doncaster Belles	4–0	2–0	4–0	0–0	—	4–1	3–1	5–1	1–1	6–0
Everton	0–1	4–0	1–2	0–3	2–0	—	0–0	2–1	1–0	0–4
Leeds United	2–5	3–0	1–0	2–0	1–1	4–3	—	1–2	5–0	3–4
Southampton Saints	0–3	3–1	1–2	0–3	1–2	1–2	2–2	—	0–0	0–0
Sunderland	0–3	2–3	1–1	1–4	2–4	0–1	1–1	1–3	—	0–1
Tranmere Rovers	1–5	4–0	4–1	1–1	1–5	2–3	3–3	3–0	1–3	—

Source: FA WPL
Legend: Blue = home team win; Yellow = draw; Red = away team win.

== Northern Division ==
FA Women's Premier League Northern Division
- Season: 2001–02
- Champions: Birmingham City
- Promoted: Birmingham City
- Relegated: Coventry City
- Matches: 110
- Goals: 392 (3.56 per match)
- Biggest home win: Ilkeston Town 8–0 Coventry City (20 January 2002)
- Biggest away win: Sheffield Wednesday 0–7 Aston Villa (26 August 2001)

Map showing the locations of the teams in the Northern Division of the FA Women's Premier League
Map showing the locations of the teams in the Northern Division of the FA Women's Premier League

Changes from last season:

- Leeds United were promoted to the National Division
- Manchester City were promoted from the Northern Combination League
- Mansfield Town were promoted from the Midland Combination League
- Liverpool were relegated from the National League
- Newcastle Town were relegated to the Midland Combination League
- Huddersfield Town were relegated to the Northern Combination League
- Mansfield Town became North Notts

=== League table ===
Pos	Team	Pld	W	D	L	GF	GA	GD	Pts	Promotion or relegation
1	Birmingham City (C, P)	20	16	3	1	68	21	+47	51	Promotion to the National Division
2	Wolverhampton Wanderers	20	11	4	5	39	27	+12	37	
3	Oldham Curzon	20	10	6	4	39	22	+17	36	
4	Ilkeston Town	20	9	6	5	43	27	+16	33	
5	Liverpool	20	8	6	6	41	27	+14	30	
6	Bangor City	20	7	8	5	40	35	+5	29	
7	Sheffield Wednesday	20	6	7	7	32	38	−6	25	
8	Aston Villa	20	6	6	8	42	39	+3	24	
9	Garswood Saints	20	4	6	10	21	47	−26	18	
10	Manchester City	20	4	4	12	19	45	−26	16	
11	Coventry City (R)	20	0	2	18	8	64	−56	2	Relegation to the Midland Combination League
12	North Notts (X)	0	0	0	0	0	0	0	0	Withdrew midway through the season. Records expunged.

Source: FA WPL
(C) Champions; (P) Promoted; (R) Relegated; (X) ?

^{1} - North Notts withdrew, record annulled

=== Results ===
Home \ Away	ASV	BAC	BIC	CVC	GAS	ILK	LIV	MCI	OLC	SHW	WOW
Aston Villa	—	5–5	1–3	2–0	0–2	3–3	3–3	0–1	0–0	2–3	0–2
Bangor City	1–1	—	2–3	6–0	1–2	2–2	1–0	2–0	1–1	2–2	1–2
Birmingham City	3–1	2–2	—	3–0	5–0	0–0	4–1	2–0	4–3	6–2	3–1
Coventry City	0–5	2–3	0–0	—	1–2	0–2	0–3	0–3	1–4	1–4	0–2
Garswood Saints	1–3	2–2	0–6	2–1	—	2–3	1–2	2–2	0–0	1–1	0–2
Ilkeston Town	3–1	0–2	3–1	8–0	5–0	—	1–1	4–1	0–4	1–1	0–0
Liverpool	1–2	5–0	2–5	5–0	1–1	2–0	—	2–0	4–0	1–1	5–3
Manchester City	1–4	1–2	1–5	3–1	5–2	0–5	0–0	—	2–4	0–3	2–1
Oldham Curzon	3–0	0–0	1–2	4–0	5–2	3–2	2–1	0–0	—	2–1	2–0
Sheffield Wednesday	0–7	1–4	1–3	1–1	2–0	0–1	2–2	4–1	1–0	—	2–3
Wolverhampton Wanderers	2–2	5–1	1–7	2–0	4–0	4–0	1–0	3–1	0–0	1–1	—

Source: FA WPL
Legend: Blue = home team win; Yellow = draw; Red = away team win.

== Southern Division ==
FA Women's Premier League Southern Division
- Season: 2001–02
- Champions: Fulham
- Promoted: Fulham
- Relegated: Queens Park Rangers; Berkhamsted Town
- Matches: 132
- Goals: 690 (5.23 per match)
- Biggest home win: Fulham 22–0 Barking (24 February 2002)
- Longest unbeaten run: Fulham (22)

Map showing the locations of the teams in the Southern Division of the FA Women's Premier League
Map showing the locations of the teams in the Southern Division of the FA Women's Premier League

Changes from last season:

- Brighton & Hove Albion were promoted to the National Division
- Fulham were promoted from the South East Combination League
- Bristol Rovers were promoted from the South West Combination League
- Millwall Lionesses were relegated from the National Division
- Cardiff City were relegated to the South West Combination League
- Reading Royals were relegated to the South West Combination League
- Wembley Mill Hill merged with Queens Park Rangers

=== League table ===
Pos	Team	Pld	W	D	L	GF	GA	GD	Pts	Promotion or relegation
1	Fulham (C, P)	22	22	0	0	234	6	+228	66	Promotion to the National Division
2	Bristol Rovers	22	14	2	6	72	35	+37	44	
3	Millwall Lionesses	22	14	1	7	55	55	0	43	
4	Chelsea	22	13	2	7	59	51	+8	41	
5	Langford	22	12	1	9	53	46	+7	37	
6	Wimbledon	22	11	3	8	41	55	−14	36	
7	Ipswich Town	22	8	4	10	43	52	−9	28	
8	Barking	22	7	2	13	40	79	−39	23	
9	Newport County	22	6	3	13	37	60	−23	21	
10	Barnet	22	5	6	11	27	75	−48	21	
11	Queens Park Rangers (R)	22	3	5	14	19	60	−41	14	Relegation to the South East Combination League
12	Berkhamsted Town (R)	22	1	3	18	10	116	−106	6	Relegation to the South East Combination League

Source: WPL
(C) Champions; (P) Promoted; (R) Relegated

^{1} - Wembley Mill Hill and Queens Park Rangers merged.

=== Results ===
Home \ Away	BRK	BAR	BET	BRR	CHE	FUL	IPT	LAN	MIL	NEC	QPR	WIM
Barking	—	2–4	1–1	0–0	2–3	1–4	3–2	1–4	3–1	2–1	3–1	0–3
Barnet	3–7	—	2–0	0–6	0–3	1–7	1–1	5–3	1–2	0–2	1–1	0–4
Berkhamsted Town	0–5	1–1	—	1–5	0–6	0–12	1–0	2–6	0–7	0–2	0–0	1–7
Bristol Rovers	3–1	0–1	10–0	—	4–1	1–6	0–1	3–2	8–0	3–1	5–0	10–1
Chelsea	8–3	5–0	5–1	1–0	—	0–9	2–0	1–3	2–1	5–2	4–0	3–0
Fulham	22–0	18–0	15–0	12–1	9–1	—	12–0	9–0	9–0	9–1	3–0	9–0
Ipswich Town	2–0	2–2	12–0	1–4	6–3	0–13	—	1–3	3–0	2–0	2–0	4–1
Langford	4–2	3–1	4–1	0–1	0–1	0–5	2–2	—	3–4	4–1	3–0	0–1
Millwall Lionesses	7–0	1–2	1–0	2–2	6–1	0–11	1–0	2–1	—	5–4	2–1	3–1
Newport County	1–2	5–0	3–0	1–2	3–3	0–14	1–1	0–2	1–2	—	5–0	1–1
Queens Park Rangers	3–1	1–1	6–0	0–2	1–1	0–14	2–1	1–2	2–4	0–2	—	0–0
Wimbledon	2–1	1–1	6–1	4–2	1–0	0–12	1–0	2–4	0–3	2–0	4–0	—

Source: WPL
Legend: Blue = home team win; Yellow = draw; Red = away team win.
