= 2002–03 FA Women's Premier League =

FA Women's Premier League
- Season: 2002–03

The 2002–03 FA Women's Premier League season was the 12th season of the FA Women's Premier League.

== National Division ==
FA Women's Premier League National Division
- Season: 2002–03
- Champions: Fulham; 1st title
- Relegated: Southampton Saints; Brighton & Hove Albion
- UEFA Cup: Fulham
- Matches: 90
- Goals: 324 (3.6 per match)
- Biggest home win: Arsenal 6–0 Tranmere Rovers (1 September 2002)
- Highest scoring: Leeds United 3–6 Arsenal (8 September 2002)
- Longest unbeaten run: Fulham (18)

Locations of the FA Women's Premier League National Division Teams
Locations of the FA Women's Premier League National Division Teams (Greater London)

Changes from last season:

- Birmingham City were promoted from the Northern Division
- Fulham were promoted from the Southern Division
- Sunderland were relegated to the Northern Division
- Barry Town were relegated to the Southern Division

=== League table ===
Pos	Team	Pld	W	D	L	GF	GA	GD	Pts	Qualification or relegation
1	Fulham (C)	18	16	2	0	63	13	+50	49 (Note: Deducted 1 point for fielding ineligible player (Jess Wright) against Charlton Athletic on October 23, 2002.)	Qualification for the UEFA Cup qualifying round
2	Doncaster Belles	18	13	2	3	34	19	+15	41	
3	Arsenal	18	13	1	4	53	21	+32	40	
4	Charlton Athletic	18	10	4	4	44	20	+24	34	
5	Birmingham City	18	6	3	9	26	31	−5	21	
6	Tranmere Rovers	18	6	3	9	25	48	−23	21	
7	Leeds United	18	5	4	9	33	42	−9	19	
8	Everton	18	5	1	12	18	38	−20	16	
9	Southampton Saints (R)	18	2	5	11	10	30	−20	11	Relegation to the Southern Division
10	Brighton & Hove Albion (R)	18	1	1	16	18	62	−44	4	Relegation to the Southern Division

Source: FA WPL
(C) Champions; (R) Relegated

=== Results ===
Home \ Away	ARS	BIR	BRI	CHA	DON	EVE	FUL	LEE	SOU	TRA
Arsenal	—	5–0	4–1	1–2	3–1	3–2	1–2	4–1	1–0	6–0
Birmingham City	1–0	—	4–2	1–3	0–2	0–0	1–2	1–1	1–0	2–3
Brighton & Hove Albion	1–5	0–3	—	1–5	0–3	2–3	0–6	0–4	1–2	1–3
Charlton Athletic	0–1	3–2	6–1	—	1–2	5–0	1–1	2–3	4–0	2–0
Doncaster Belles	1–1	1–0	1–0	2–1	—	3–0	0–4	3–1	1–0	2–2
Everton	0–1	1–5	2–1	0–2	1–4	—	0–2	0–1	1–0	3–1
Fulham	4–1	3–1	6–1	3–3	2–1	3–0	—	3–1	5–0	5–1
Leeds United	3–6	3–4	2–2	2–2	2–3	1–3	0–3	—	1–1	4–3
Southampton Saints	1–2	0–0	1–3	0–0	0–1	2–1	1–3	0–2	—	1–1
Tranmere Rovers	1–7	2–0	2–1	0–2	1–3	2–1	0–6	2–1	1–1	—

Source: FA WPL
Legend: Blue = home team win; Yellow = draw; Red = away team win.

== Northern Division ==
FA Women's Premier League Northern Division
- Season: 2002–03
- Champions: Aston Villa
- Relegated: Ilkeston Town; Garswood Saints
- Matches: 132
- Goals: 425 (3.22 per match)
- Biggest home win: Bangor City 8–0 Garswood Saints (22 September 2002)
- Biggest away win: Garswood Saints 1–8 Aston Villa (11 May 2003)
- Highest scoring: Lincoln City 3–7 Aston Villa (1 September 2002)

Map showing the locations of the teams in the Northern Division of the FA Women's Premier League
Map showing the locations of the teams in the Northern Division of the FA Women's Premier League

Changes from last season:

- Birmingham City were promoted to the National Division
- Middlesbrough were promoted from the Northern Combination League
- Lincoln City were promoted from the Midland Combination League
- Sunderland were relegated from the National Division
- Coventry City were relegated to the Midland Combination League
- North Notts withdrew from the Northern Division

=== League table ===
Pos	Team	Pld	W	D	L	GF	GA	GD	Pts	Promotion or relegation
1	Aston Villa (C, P)	22	16	4	2	59	18	+41	52	Promotion to the National Division
2	Sunderland	22	15	4	3	48	25	+23	49	
3	Oldham Curzon	22	14	2	6	48	29	+19	44	
4	Bangor City	22	11	4	7	46	37	+9	37	
5	Wolverhampton Wanderers	22	9	5	8	28	26	+2	32	
6	Liverpool	22	7	8	7	37	32	+5	29	
7	Lincoln City	22	6	7	9	38	46	−8	25	
8	Manchester City	22	5	6	11	31	37	−6	21	
9	Middlesbrough	22	6	2	14	25	44	−19	20	
10	Sheffield Wednesday	22	5	5	12	15	36	−21	20	
11	Ilkeston Town (R)	22	5	4	13	24	44	−20	19	Relegation to the Midland Combination League
12	Garswood Saints (R)	22	4	7	11	26	51	−25	19	Relegation to the Northern Combination League

Source: FA WPL
(C) Champions; (P) Promoted; (R) Relegated

=== Results ===
Home \ Away	ASV	BAC	GAS	ILK	LIC	LIV	MCI	MID	OLC	SHW	SUN	WOW
Aston Villa	—	4–1	3–3	2–0	1–0	1–2	4–1	1–0	3–0	0–0	4–1	1–1
Bangor City	1–4	—	8–0	2–2	4–1	3–2	2–1	2–3	3–1	2–1	0–3	2–1
Garswood Saints	1–8	3–5	—	3–1	2–2	1–1	1–1	1–0	0–3	3–0	2–2	1–2
Ilkeston Town	0–0	1–3	0–1	—	3–1	2–1	0–5	3–1	2–3	1–0	0–1	0–2
Lincoln City	3–7	1–0	3–1	3–3	—	2–2	1–2	2–3	1–1	2–1	1–0	3–2
Liverpool	0–3	1–1	1–1	0–1	4–3	—	1–1	1–1	1–2	0–1	3–2	3–0
Manchester City	0–1	1–1	2–0	3–3	0–1	0–3	—	1–2	0–5	0–0	2–3	1–2
Middlesbrough	2–3	1–2	2–0	2–1	2–2	0–4	0–4	—	0–3	1–2	1–4	2–4
Oldham Curzon	1–3	1–1	3–0	2–1	4–3	2–0	3–2	1–0	—	6–0	1–2	0–1
Sheffield Wednesday	0–2	1–0	1–0	2–0	1–1	3–5	0–3	0–2	1–2	—	0–3	0–0
Sunderland	2–0	0–0	1–1	2–0	4–3	2–2	0–0	3–1	6–3	3–1	—	2–0
Wolverhampton Wanderers	0–2	1–2	2–1	3–0	0–0	0–0	4–2	2–0	0–1	0–0	1–3	—

Source: FA WPL
Legend: Blue = home team win; Yellow = draw; Red = away team win.

== Southern Division ==
FA Women's Premier League Southern Division
- Season: 2002–03
- Champions: Bristol Rovers
- Promoted: Bristol Rovers
- Relegated: Barking
- Matches: 110
- Goals: 424 (3.85 per match)
- Biggest home win: Bristol Rovers 13–0 Barking (6 October 2002)
- Biggest away win: Enfield Town 0–6 Ipswich Town (13 October 2002)

Map showing the locations of the teams in the Southern Division of the FA Women's Premier League
Map showing the locations of the teams in the Southern Division of the FA Women's Premier League

Changes from last season:

- Fulham were promoted to the National Division
- Enfield Town were promoted from the South East Combination League
- Bristol City were promoted from the South West Combination League
- Barry Town were relegated from the National Division
- Queens Park Rangers were relegated to the South East Combination League
- Berkhamsted Town were relegated to the South East Combination League
- Newport County became Merthyr Tydfil
- Barry Town resigned from the League due to a shortage of players

=== League table ===
Pos	Team	Pld	W	D	L	GF	GA	GD	Pts	Promotion or relegation
1	Bristol Rovers (C, P)	20	17	1	2	76	19	+57	52	Promotion to the National Division
2	Ipswich Town	20	11	2	7	49	36	+13	35	
3	Millwall Lionesses	20	10	4	6	41	33	+8	34	
4	Barnet	20	10	4	6	29	24	+5	34	
5	Bristol City	20	9	5	6	46	35	+11	32	
6	Chelsea	20	10	2	8	33	31	+2	32	
7	Merthyr Tydfil	20	9	3	8	30	34	−4	30	
8	Langford	20	8	5	7	38	35	+3	29	
9	Wimbledon	20	6	1	13	28	47	−19	19	Club dissolved at the end of the season, but reformed as AFC Wimbledon
10	Enfield Town	20	3	2	15	32	59	−27	11	
11	Barking (R)	20	2	1	17	22	71	−49	7	Relegation to the South East Combination League
12	Barry Town (X)	0	0	0	0	0	0	0	0	Folded before the new season began

Source: FA WPL
(C) Champions; (P) Promoted; (R) Relegated; (X) ?

^{1} - Newport County changed its name to Merthyr Tydfil.

^{2} - Barry Town (relegated from the first level) folded before the season began.

=== Results ===
Home \ Away	BRK	BAR	BAT	BRC	BRR	CHE	ENT	IPT	LAN	MET	MIL	WIM
Barking	—	0–2	X–X	1–2	2–5	2–4	0–2	1–1	1–4	1–2	2–1	3–4
Barnet	3–0	—	X–X	1–0	0–1	2–1	2–0	2–4	0–0	2–1	1–2	3–0
Barry Town	X–X	X–X	—	X–X	X–X	X–X	X–X	X–X	X–X	X–X	X–X	X–X
Bristol City	4–2	3–1	X–X	—	2–3	1–2	2–1	1–1	2–2	0–0	2–2	2–0
Bristol Rovers	13–0	2–0	X–X	4–1	—	1–0	5–2	5–0	2–3	3–1	6–0	3–0
Chelsea	3–0	1–2	X–X	0–0	0–3	—	2–1	1–2	2–1	2–1	0–4	1–2
Enfield Town	3–4	1–2	X–X	3–7	2–5	2–3	—	0–6	3–3	1–2	1–3	3–1
Ipswich Town	3–2	5–1	X–X	4–3	1–3	3–4	2–3	—	7–1	2–0	1–2	1–0
Langford	4–0	1–1	X–X	0–3	1–0	3–2	0–1	1–3	—	1–2	3–1	0–0
Merthyr Tydfil	2–1	1–1	X–X	3–5	1–3	0–1	1–1	1–0	4–2	—	2–1	3–2
Millwall Lionesses	5–0	1–1	X–X	2–4	2–2	0–0	2–1	1–3	2–1	4–1	—	1–0
Wimbledon	4–0	0–2	X–X	3–2	1–7	1–4	3–2	4–0	0–3	1–2	2–5	—

Source: FA WPL
Legend: Blue = home team win; Yellow = draw; Red = away team win.
