= 2008–09 FA Women's Premier League =

FA Women's Premier League
- Season: 2008–09

The 2008–09 FA Women's Premier League season was the 18th season of the FA Women's Premier League, England's highest-tier women's association football league at that time.

== National Division ==
FA Women's Premier League National Division
- Season: 2008–09
- Dates: 17 August 2008–10 May 2009
- Champions: Arsenal
- Relegated: Liverpool; Fulham
- Champions League: Arsenal; Everton
- Matches: 132
- Goals: 493 (3.73 per match)
- Top goalscorer: Kelly Smith (25)
- Biggest home win: DON 7–0 FUL (31 Aug); ARS 7–0 FUL (18 Dec); EVE 7–0 FOR (1 Feb)
- Biggest away win: LIV 2–11 ARS (24 Aug)
- Highest scoring: LIV 2–11 ARS (24 Aug)
- Longest winning run: 16 - Arsenal (17 Aug–26 Mar)
- Longest unbeaten run: 21 - Everton (17 Aug–6 May)
- Longest winless run: 21 - Fulham (17 Aug–12 Apr)
- Longest losing run: 5 - Fulham (1 Mar–29 Mar); Nottingham Forest (17 Aug–18 Sep)
- All statistics correct as of 10 May 2009.

Locations of the FA Women's Premier League National Division Teams
Locations of the FA Women's Premier League National Division Teams (Greater London)

Changes from last season:

- Nottingham Forest were promoted from the Northern Division
- Fulham were promoted from the Southern Division
- Cardiff City were relegated to the Southern Division
- Charlton Athletic were relegated to the Southern Division
- Leeds United became Leeds Carnegie

=== League table ===
Pos	Team	Pld	W	D	L	GF	GA	GD	Pts	Qualification or relegation
1	Arsenal (C)	22	20	1	1	89	14	+75	61	Qualification for the Champions League knockout phase
2	Everton	22	20	1	1	68	10	+58	61	Qualification for the Champions League qualifying round
3	Chelsea	22	16	2	4	55	23	+32	50	
4	Doncaster Rovers Belles	22	9	6	7	43	36	+7	33	
5	Birmingham City	22	10	3	9	39	43	−4	33	
6	Leeds Carnegie	22	8	4	10	32	40	−8	28	
7	Watford	22	7	4	11	31	40	−9	25	
8	Bristol Academy	22	5	8	9	39	49	−10	23	
9	Blackburn Rovers	22	5	3	14	27	52	−25	18	
10	Nottingham Forest	22	5	2	15	25	59	−34	17	
11	Liverpool (R)	22	4	4	14	28	63	−35	16	Relegation to the Northern Division
12	Fulham (R)	22	1	6	15	17	64	−47	9	Relegation to the Southern Division

Source: FA WPL
(C) Champions; (R) Relegated

=== Results ===
Home \ Away	ARS	BIR	BLA	BRI	CHE	DON	EVE	FUL	LEE	LIV	NOT	WAT
Arsenal	—	6–2	4–0	3–0	4–1	6–1	0–3	7–0	4–0	2–0	5–0	6–1
Birmingham City	1–3	—	1–1	2–1	0–1	2–2	0–1	3–1	3–2	0–1	4–0	3–2
Blackburn Rovers	0–4	4–1	—	2–2	1–2	1–2	1–3	1–2	2–2	0–1	0–3	1–4
Bristol Academy	1–4	4–2	3–1	—	1–2	1–1	1–3	1–1	1–2	6–0	4–2	2–2
Chelsea	0–2	3–3	4–0	3–0	—	4–1	0–4	4–1	3–1	5–0	3–1	1–0
Doncaster Rovers Belles	0–0	3–1	2–0	4–0	0–1	—	0–3	7–0	0–3	2–3	2–1	2–1
Everton	0–1	4–2	4–2	5–0	1–0	1–0	—	6–0	5–0	5–0	7–0	3–1
Fulham	0–5	0–1	3–4	2–2	0–5	0–0	1–4	—	0–2	2–2	1–3	0–0
Leeds Carnegie	1–6	1–2	0–2	1–1	0–2	3–3	0–0	2–1	—	4–1	4–1	1–0
Liverpool	2–11	2–3	1–2	2–3	1–1	2–5	1–2	2–2	1–3	—	1–2	0–1
Nottingham Forest	1–5	0–1	0–3	2–2	1–5	1–4	0–3	1–0	1–0	2–2	—	1–2
Watford	0–1	1–2	4–1	3–3	1–5	2–2	0–1	2–0	1–0	0–3	2–2	—

Source: FA WPL
Legend: Blue = home team win; Yellow = draw; Red = away team win.

=== Top scorers ===
Rank	Player	Team	Goals
1	(England) Kelly Smith	Arsenal	25
2	(England) Lianne Sanderson	Chelsea	13
3	(England) Eniola Aluko	Chelsea	12
3	(England) Natasha Dowie	Everton	12
3	(Wales) Cheryl Foster	Liverpool	12

== Northern Division ==
FA Women's Premier League Northern Division
- Season: 2008–09
- Champions: Sunderland
- Promoted: Sunderland
- Relegated: Tranmere Rovers; Rotherham United
- Matches: 132
- Goals: 574 (4.35 per match)
- Biggest home win: Newcastle United 12–0 Rotherham United (19 April 2009)
- Biggest away win: Rotherham United 0–11 Sunderland (5 April 2009)

Map showing the locations of the teams in the Northern Division of the FA Women's Premier League
Map showing the locations of the teams in the Northern Division of the FA Women's Premier League
Map showing the locations of the teams in the Northern Division of the FA Women's Premier League

Changes from last season:

- Nottingham Forest were promoted to the National Division
- Curzon Ashton were promoted from the Northern Combination League
- Leicester City were promoted from the Midland Combination League
- Reading were promoted from the South West Combination League
- Stockport County were relegated to the Northern Combination League
- Crewe Alexandra were relegated to the Midland Combination League
- Lincoln City became OOH Lincoln

=== League table ===
Pos	Team	Pld	W	D	L	GF	GA	GD	Pts	Promotion or relegation
1	Sunderland (C, P)	22	17	2	3	95	16	+79	53	Promotion to the National Division
2	OOH Lincoln	22	16	4	2	79	15	+64	52	
3	Manchester City	22	13	4	5	42	22	+20	43	
4	Newcastle United	22	12	5	5	58	28	+30	41	
5	Leicester City	22	12	4	6	54	33	+21	40	
6	Reading	22	9	6	7	43	31	+12	33	Moved to the Southern Division
7	Aston Villa	22	10	2	10	49	50	−1	32	
8	Preston North End	22	7	3	12	37	51	−14	24	
9	Sheffield Wednesday	22	6	0	16	37	72	−35	18	
10	Curzon Ashton	22	4	4	14	35	70	−35	16	
11	Tranmere Rovers (R)	22	4	2	16	28	76	−48	14	Relegation to the Northern Combination League
12	Rotherham United (R)	22	3	2	17	17	110	−93	11	Relegation to the Midland Combination League

Source: FA WPL
Rules for classification: 1) Points; 2) Goal difference; 3) Number of goals scored
(C) Champions; (P) Promoted; (R) Relegated

=== Results ===
Home \ Away	ASV	CRZ	LCY	LIN	MCY	NEW	PNE	RDG	RUT	SWD	SAF	TRO
Aston Villa	—	4–2	3–2	1–0	3–2	1–2	2–1	0–0	9–1	2–4	2–3	4–0
Curzon Ashton	1–2	—	0–0	0–3	0–2	1–0	2–2	0–3	6–0	6–1	0–9	3–4
Leicester City	3–1	4–1	—	0–3	1–1	1–3	1–0	2–0	8–1	4–1	1–4	4–1
OOH Lincoln	5–1	9–0	3–3	—	3–0	3–0	1–1	1–0	7–1	7–0	2–1	4–0
Manchester City	2–0	4–1	0–3	1–2	—	0–0	5–1	1–1	3–0	3–2	1–0	3–0
Newcastle United	2–1	8–1	2–0	0–0	1–1	—	2–5	2–2	12–0	2–0	1–5	3–0
Preston North End	4–0	3–4	1–1	2–4	0–3	0–5	—	H–W	4–0	4–3	0–4	2–3
Reading	2–2	4–2	2–1	1–1	1–2	1–2	2–0	—	5–0	1–0	0–3	6–1
Rotherham United	2–1	2–2	0–6	0–9	0–2	0–6	1–2	0–5	—	2–4	0–11	2–2
Sheffield Wednesday	2–6	2–1	3–4	0–4	1–3	1–2	2–0	2–3	1–2	—	0–5	4–1
Sunderland	11–0	2–2	1–3	3–2	1–0	1–1	5–0	6–0	2–0	7–1	—	7–0
Tranmere Rovers	0–4	2–0	2–3	0–6	1–3	4–2	1–3	3–3	1–3	2–3	0–4	—

Source: FA WPL
Legend: Blue = home team win; Yellow = draw; Red = away team win.

== Southern Division ==
FA Women's Premier League Southern Division
- Season: 2008–09
- Champions: Millwall Lionesses
- Promoted: Millwall Lionesses
- Relegated: Ipswich Town; Turo City
- Matches: 132
- Goals: 433 (3.28 per match)
- Biggest home win: Millwall Lionesses 9–0 Ipswich Town (22 March 2009)
- Biggest away win: Ipswich Town 0–7 Portsmouth (9 November 2008)

Map showing the locations of the teams in the Southern Division of the FA Women's Premier League
Map showing the locations of the teams in the Southern Division of the FA Women's Premier League

Changes from last season:

- Fulham were promoted to the National Division
- Ipswich Town were promoted from the South East Combination League
- Cardiff City were relegated from the National Division
- Charlton Athletic were relegated from the National Division
- Team Bath were relegated to the South West Combination League
- Reading Royals were relegated to the South West Combination League
- Newquay became Truro City

=== League table ===
Pos	Team	Pld	W	D	L	GF	GA	GD	Pts	Promotion or relegation
1	Millwall Lionesses (C, P)	22	17	3	2	61	14	+47	54	Promotion to the National Division
2	Barnet	22	11	7	4	58	33	+25	40	
3	West Ham United	22	10	9	3	41	20	+21	39	
4	Charlton Athletic	22	10	6	6	37	28	+9	36	
5	Portsmouth	22	10	5	7	50	35	+15	35	
6	Colchester United	22	8	6	8	37	41	−4	30	
7	Cardiff City	22	8	5	9	40	38	+2	29	
8	Keynsham Town	22	8	3	11	34	49	−15	27	
9	Crystal Palace	22	5	8	9	31	43	−12	23	
10	Brighton & Hove Albion	22	5	5	12	28	44	−16	20	
11	Ipswich Town (R)	22	5	3	14	19	64	−45	18	Relegation to the South East Combination League
12	Truro City (R)	22	3	4	15	31	58	−27	13	Relegation to the South West Combination League

Source: FA WPL
Rules for classification: 1) Points; 2) Goal difference; 3) Number of goals scored
(C) Champions; (P) Promoted; (R) Relegated

=== Results ===
Home \ Away	BAR	BHA	CCY	CHA	COU	CPL	IPT	KTW	MIL	POR	TRC	WHU
Barnet	—	1–2	1–1	5–2	5–3	5–2	3–0	2–2	2–5	3–4	6–0	1–1
Brighton & Hove Albion	2–4	—	3–5	1–1	1–3	1–1	4–2	1–2	0–1	1–1	4–2	0–1
Cardiff City	1–2	2–0	—	0–1	2–2	2–0	4–0	3–1	0–3	2–2	0–2	0–3
Charlton Athletic	0–1	4–0	1–1	—	2–0	2–0	2–2	1–2	1–0	3–4	3–0	2–3
Colchester United	1–0	1–0	2–3	1–1	—	0–2	0–1	4–4	1–4	4–3	3–2	2–2
Crystal Palace	0–0	4–4	4–3	1–1	1–1	—	0–0	1–4	0–3	0–2	0–4	1–1
Ipswich Town	1–6	2–0	0–3	0–3	1–0	0–3	—	0–2	1–2	0–7	2–4	0–5
Keynsham Town	1–1	0–1	0–2	2–3	1–3	1–5	3–0	—	0–5	2–1	2–1	1–4
Millwall Lionesses	2–3	3–0	3–2	1–1	3–0	4–1	9–0	1–0	—	0–0	2–0	0–0
Portsmouth	2–2	3–1	4–1	3–0	1–2	3–2	1–2	5–0	0–3	—	2–2	1–2
Truro City	1–5	1–2	1–1	1–2	2–2	1–2	3–5	1–2	1–5	1–1	—	1–6
West Ham United	0–0	0–0	3–2	0–1	0–2	1–1	0–0	4–2	1–2	3–0	1–1	—

Source: FA WPL
Legend: Blue = home team win; Yellow = draw; Red = away team win.
