= 2003–04 FA Women's Premier League =

FA Women's Premier League
- Season: 2003–04

The 2003–04 FA Women's Premier League season was the 13th season of the FA Women's Premier League.

== National Division ==
FA Women's Premier League National Division
- Season: 2003–04
- Champions: Arsenal; 6th title
- Relegated: Aston Villa; Tranmere Rovers
- UEFA Cup: Arsenal
- Matches: 90
- Goals: 346 (3.84 per match)
- Biggest home win: Arsenal 8–0 Aston Villa (18 April 2004)
- Biggest away win: Tranmere Rovers 0–8 Fulham (14 March 2004)
- Highest scoring: Tranmere Rovers 2–9 Arsenal (17 August 2003)

Locations of the FA Women's Premier League National Division Teams
Locations of the FA Women's Premier League National Division Teams (Greater London)

Changes from last season:

- Aston Villa were promoted from the Northern Division
- Bristol Rovers were promoted from the Southern Division
- Southampton Saints were relegated to the Southern Division
- Brighton & Hove Albion were relegated to the Southern Division
- Doncaster Belles became Doncaster Rovers Belles

=== League table ===
Pos	Team	Pld	W	D	L	GF	GA	GD	Pts	Qualification or relegation
1	Arsenal (C)	18	15	2	1	65	11	+54	47	Qualification for the UEFA Cup qualifying round
2	Charlton Athletic	18	15	1	2	52	17	+35	46	
3	Fulham	18	14	2	2	60	20	+40	44	
4	Leeds United	18	8	4	6	32	28	+4	28	
5	Doncaster Rovers Belles	18	8	3	7	41	40	+1	27	
6	Everton	18	6	2	10	21	36	−15	20	
7	Birmingham City	18	4	5	9	17	31	−14	17	
8	Bristol Rovers	18	3	3	12	27	37	−10	12	
9	Aston Villa (R)	18	1	4	13	18	63	−45	7	Relegation to Northern Division
10	Tranmere Rovers (R)	18	1	4	13	13	63	−50	7	Relegation to Northern Division

Source: FA WPL
(C) Champions; (R) Relegated

=== Results ===
Home \ Away	ARS	AVL	BIR	BRI	CHA	DON	EVE	FUL	LEE	TRA
Arsenal	—	8–0	2–1	3–1	1–0	7–0	0–0	3–1	4–0	6–0
Aston Villa	1–7	—	0–1	1–2	2–5	2–7	0–1	0–7	1–1	1–1
Birmingham City	0–3	1–1	—	0–5	2–3	1–2	1–0	0–3	0–2	1–1
Bristol Rovers	0–3	0–0	1–2	—	1–2	3–3	2–3	2–3	0–1	5–0
Charlton Athletic	2–1	8–2	1–1	3–1	—	1–0	3–0	2–3	5–0	3–0
Doncaster Rovers Belles	0–2	3–2	1–1	3–1	1–3	—	2–1	2–3	3–3	3–1
Everton	1–3	4–2	3–2	3–1	0–4	2–5	—	0–1	2–0	1–1
Fulham	1–1	5–0	2–1	2–0	1–2	5–3	4–0	—	4–1	5–1
Leeds United	1–2	2–0	0–0	4–1	0–1	2–1	4–0	2–2	—	2–0
Tranmere Rovers	2–9	0–3	1–2	1–1	1–4	0–2	1–0	0–8	2–7	—

Source: FA WPL
Legend: Blue = home team win; Yellow = draw; Red = away team win.

== Northern Division ==
FA Women's Premier League Northern Division
- Season: 2003–04
- Champions: Liverpool
- Promoted: Liverpool
- Relegated: Chesterfield; Bangor City
- Matches: 110
- Goals: 373 (3.39 per match)
- Biggest away win: Chesterfield 0–8 Sunderland (14 March 2004)

Map showing the locations of the teams in the Northern Division of the FA Women's Premier League
Map showing the locations of the teams in the Northern Division of the FA Women's Premier League

Changes from last season:

- Aston Villa were promoted to the National Division
- Stockport County were promoted from the Northern Combination League
- Chesterfield were promoted from the Midland Combination League
- Garswood Saints were relegated to the Northern Combination League
- Ilkeston Town were relegated to the Midland Combination League

=== League table ===
Pos	Team	Pld	W	D	L	GF	GA	GD	Pts	Promotion or relegation
1	Liverpool (C, P)	20	15	5	0	51	12	+39	50	Promotion to the National Division
2	Sunderland	20	10	7	3	56	31	+25	37	
3	Stockport County	20	10	4	6	41	22	+19	34	
4	Oldham Curzon	20	9	7	4	39	21	+18	34	
5	Wolverhampton Wanderers	20	6	9	5	27	22	+5	27	
6	Middlesbrough	20	7	5	8	25	28	−3	26	
7	Manchester City	20	7	3	10	35	45	−10	24	
8	Lincoln City	20	6	5	9	34	38	−4	23	
9	Sheffield Wednesday	20	6	4	10	30	45	−15	22	
10	Chesterfield (R)	20	5	6	9	23	50	−27	21	Relegation to the Midland Combination League
11	Bangor City (R)	20	0	3	17	12	59	−47	3	Relegation to the Northern Combination League

Source: FA WPL
(C) Champions; (P) Promoted; (R) Relegated

=== Results ===
Home \ Away	BAC	CHE	LIC	LIV	MCI	MID	OLC	SHW	STC	SUN	WOW
Bangor City	—	0–1	0–3	0–3	3–4	0–1	1–4	1–2	0–3	2–7	0–0
Chesterfield	3–1	—	2–0	0–2	1–4	2–2	0–0	3–1	1–0	0–8	0–0
Lincoln City	3–1	4–0	—	1–1	4–0	0–1	0–2	4–1	4–4	2–4	0–2
Liverpool	4–0	7–0	1–1	—	1–0	2–1	2–1	4–2	2–1	5–1	5–0
Manchester City	5–0	4–4	0–2	0–1	—	1–2	2–1	4–3	0–2	1–1	1–1
Middlesbrough	1–1	6–0	5–3	0–1	0–1	—	1–2	0–1	0–1	1–0	1–0
Oldham Curzon	4–0	2–1	0–0	1–2	2–3	1–1	—	8–1	1–0	2–2	0–0
Sheffield Wednesday	2–1	1–1	2–0	0–5	5–0	1–1	2–3	—	0–2	2–2	1–1
Stockport County	4–0	1–0	7–1	1–1	3–2	1–1	1–1	3–1	—	5–1	1–2
Sunderland	4–0	4–4	4–1	1–1	3–2	7–0	1–1	2–0	1–0	—	1–1
Wolverhampton Wanderers	1–1	3–0	1–1	1–1	6–1	3–0	1–3	0–2	3–1	1–2	—

Source: FA WPL
Legend: Blue = home team win; Yellow = draw; Red = away team win.

== Southern Division ==
FA Women's Premier League Southern Division
- Season: 2003–04
- Champions: Bristol City
- Promoted: Bristol City
- Relegated: Merthyr Tydfil; Barnet
- Matches: 156
- Goals: 555 (3.56 per match)
- Biggest home win: Chelsea 9–1 Merthyr Tydfil (19 October 2003)

Map showing the locations of the teams in the Southern Division of the FA Women's Premier League
Map showing the locations of the teams in the Southern Division of the FA Women's Premier League

Changes from last season:

- Bristol Rovers were promoted to the National Division
- Watford were promoted from the South East Combination League
- Portsmouth were promoted from the South West Combination League
- Southampton Saints were relegated from the National Division
- Brighton & Hove Albion were relegated from the National Division
- Barking were relegated to the South East Combination League
- After the Wimbledon men's team were dissolved, the women's team associated themselves with the new club created by Wimbledon supporters and formed a new women's team, AFC Wimbledon.

=== Table ===
Pos	Team	Pld	W	D	L	GF	GA	GD	Pts	Promotion or relegation
1	Bristol City (C, P)	24	18	4	2	78	31	+47	58	Promotion to the National Division
2	Southampton Saints	24	18	3	3	54	18	+36	57	
3	AFC Wimbledon	24	17	2	5	57	38	+19	53	
4	Chelsea	24	13	6	5	60	38	+22	45	
5	Watford	24	9	5	10	34	38	−4	32	
6	Brighton & Hove Albion	24	8	7	9	43	44	−1	31	
7	Langford	24	9	4	11	37	42	−5	31	
8	Millwall Lionesses	24	8	6	10	35	38	−3	30	
9	Ipswich Town	24	8	5	11	39	44	−5	29	
10	Portsmouth	24	9	1	14	43	48	−5	28	
11	Enfield Town	24	4	4	16	17	54	−37	16	
12	Merthyr Tydfil (R)	24	3	6	15	27	61	−34	15	Relegation to the South West Combination League
13	Barnet (R)	24	2	7	15	31	61	−30	11 (Note: Barnet 2 points deducted for using ineligible player.)	Relegation to the South East Combination League

Source: FA WPL
(C) Champions; (P) Promoted; (R) Relegated

=== Results ===
Home \ Away	WIM	BAR	BHA	BRC	CHE	ENT	IPT	LAN	MET	MIL	POR	SOU	WAT
AFC Wimbledon	—	2–1	2–1	3–4	2–2	4–0	3–2	6–2	3–0	2–1	5–1	3–1	2–1
Barnet	1–2	—	4–3	0–6	0–0	1–1	0–4	5–2	1–1	2–2	0–3	0–3	0–1
Brighton & Hove Albion	1–1	2–2	—	2–2	2–6	0–0	3–2	0–6	3–1	1–3	4–1	2–2	0–1
Bristol City	6–0	3–2	0–3	—	3–1	4–2	2–1	7–0	4–1	2–2	4–0	0–3	5–1
Chelsea	2–1	6–3	2–1	2–2	—	3–2	3–0	0–1	9–1	1–0	3–2	0–4	2–2
Enfield Town	2–1	3–1	0–4	0–4	0–3	—	2–1	0–0	1–1	0–4	1–0	0–1	0–2
Ipswich Town	2–3	2–2	0–3	1–1	3–2	1–0	—	3–2	2–1	3–1	4–2	0–1	3–0
Langford	1–2	2–1	1–1	0–3	1–4	5–0	1–0	—	0–1	1–1	3–1	0–1	0–1
Merthyr Tydfil	1–2	1–1	0–2	2–4	3–4	2–1	1–1	0–4	—	1–1	1–3	1–4	0–3
Millwall Lionesses	1–0	3–1	2–2	1–5	1–1	3–0	3–0	1–2	1–4	—	2–1	0–2	0–1
Portsmouth	2–3	2–1	2–1	1–2	1–3	4–0	4–0	0–2	4–1	4–0	—	1–5	1–2
Southampton Saints	1–2	2–1	3–0	1–2	2–0	3–1	2–2	3–0	2–1	1–0	1–1	—	2–0
Watford	2–3	5–1	1–2	2–3	1–1	2–1	2–2	1–1	1–1	1–2	0–2	1–4	—

Source: FA WPL
Legend: Blue = home team win; Yellow = draw; Red = away team win.
