= 2011 FA WSL =

English women's football season

FA WSL
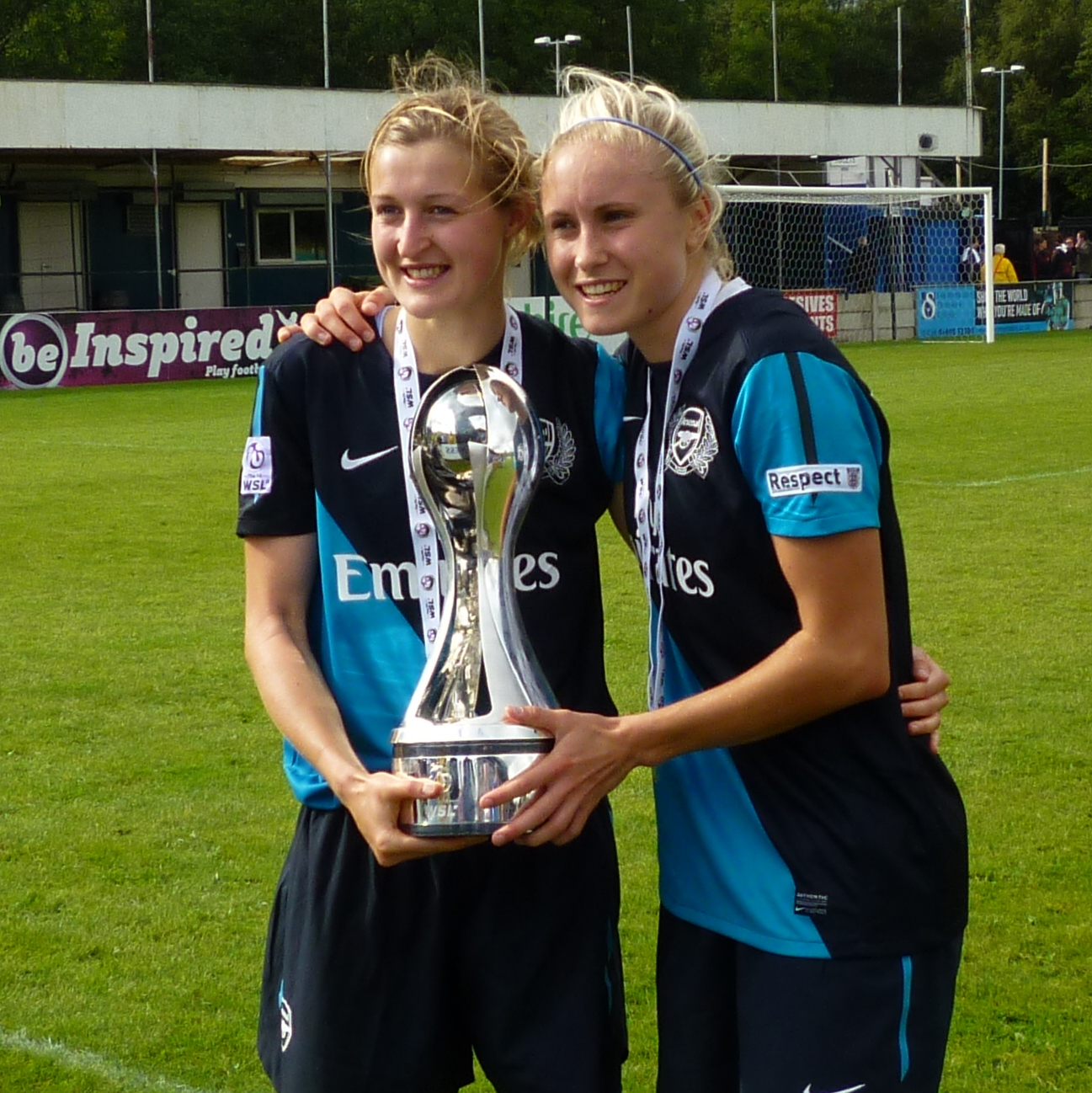
- Arsenal's Ellen White and Steph Houghton with the trophy
- Season: 2011
- Champions: Arsenal; 1st WSL title 13th English title
- Champions League: Arsenal; Birmingham City
- Matches: 56
- Goals: 142 (2.54 per match)
- Top goalscorer: Rachel Williams (14)
- Biggest home win: Birmingham City 4–0 Bristol Academy; 14 April 2011
- Biggest away win: Liverpool 0–4 Birmingham City; 20 April 2011
- Highest scoring: Liverpool 3–3 Everton; 14 April 2011
- Longest winning run: 5 games Birmingham City
- Longest unbeaten run: 10 games Birmingham City
- Longest winless run: 11 games Liverpool
- Highest attendance: 2,510; Chelsea v Arsenal
- Lowest attendance: 120; Liverpool v Doncaster Rovers Belles

The 2011 FA WSL was the inaugural season of the FA WSL, the top-level women's football league of England. The season began on 13 April 2011 and ended on 28 August 2011. The league also took a break between 12 May and mid-July to allow preparation for the 2011 FIFA Women's World Cup.

Arsenal won the competition, their eighth consecutive English title, while Birmingham finished second. The second entry to the UEFA Women's Champions League was supposed to be given to the FA Women's Cup winner. But as Arsenal had also won the FA Cup, on 6 December 2011 it was announced that Birmingham as runners-up were to be given the spot.

== Teams ==
Team	Location	Ground	Capacity	Avg Att	2009–10 season
Arsenal	Borehamwood	Meadow Park	4,502	621	Premier League National, 1st
Birmingham City	Stratford-upon-Avon	The DCS Stadium	1,400	544	Premier League National, 10th
Bristol Academy	Filton	Stoke Gifford Stadium	1,500	635	Premier League National, 12th
Chelsea	Morden	Imperial Fields	3,500	880	Premier League National, 3rd
Doncaster Rovers Belles	Doncaster	Keepmoat Stadium	15,231	448	Premier League National, 6th
Everton	Crosby	The Arriva Park	3,185	519	Premier League National, 2nd
Lincoln	Lincoln	Sincil Bank/Ashby Avenue	10,120	560	Premier League Northern, 2nd
Liverpool	Skelmersdale	West Lancashire College	2,500	466	Premier League Northern, 1st

Locations of the 2011 Super League teams

Sixteen clubs applied for a place in the inaugural season of the league: Arsenal, Barnet, Birmingham City, Bristol Academy, Chelsea, Colchester United, Doncaster Rovers Belles, Everton, Leeds Carnegie, Leicester City, Lincoln, Liverpool, Millwall Lionesses, Newcastle United, Nottingham Forest and Sunderland. Leeds Carnegie later withdrew their application.

Eight clubs were then picked by the FA from the remaining fifteen applicants: Arsenal, Birmingham City, Bristol Academy, Chelsea, Doncaster Rovers Belles, Everton, Lincoln, and Liverpool.

== League table ==
Pos	Team	Pld	W	D	L	GF	GA	GD	Pts	Qualification
1	Arsenal (C)	14	10	2	2	29	9	+20	32	Qualification for the Champions League knockout phase
2	Birmingham City	14	8	5	1	29	13	+16	29	Qualification for the Champions League knockout phase
3	Everton	14	7	4	3	19	13	+6	25	
4	Lincoln	14	6	3	5	18	16	+2	21	
5	Bristol Academy	14	4	4	6	14	20	−6	16	
6	Chelsea	14	4	3	7	14	19	−5	15	
7	Doncaster Rovers Belles	14	2	3	9	9	26	−17	9	
8	Liverpool	14	1	4	9	10	26	−16	7	

Source: FA WSL results
Rules for classification: 1) Points; 2) Goal difference; 3) Number of goals scored
(C) Champions

== Results ==
Home \ Away	ARS	BIR	BRI	CHE	DON	EVE	LIV	LIN
Arsenal		1–2	1–0	3–0	3–0	1–0	3–0	4–0
Birmingham City	1–1		4–0	3–2	3–0	2–3	0–0	1–0
Bristol Academy	2–2	2–3		0–0	1–0	0–2	1–1	2–3
Chelsea	0–1	1–1	0–1		2–1	1–3	0–1	1–1
Doncaster Rovers Belles	0–3	2–2	1–2	1–4		0–1	1–0	0–3
Everton	3–1	0–2	0–0	2–0	1–1		1–0	0–2
Liverpool	1–3	0–4	0–2	1–2	1–1	3–3		0–1
Lincoln	0–2	1–1	3–1	0–1	0–1	0–0	4–2	

Updated to match(es) played on 28 August 2011. Source: FA WSL results
Legend: Blue = home team win; Yellow = draw; Red = away team win.

== Top scorers ==
Rank	Scorer	Club	Goals
1	(England) Rachel Williams	Birmingham City	14
2	(Scotland) Kim Little	Arsenal	8
3	(England) Natasha Dowie	Everton	7
4	(England) Ellen White	Arsenal	6
5	(England) Rachel Yankey	Arsenal	5
