= 2009–10 FA Women's Premier League =

FA Women's Premier League
- Season: 2009–10

The 2009–10 FA Women's Premier League season was the 19th season of the top-flight of English women's association football. After the season the FA WSL was created above the Premier League. Teams could apply for a licence and six of the top teams were accepted.

== National Division ==
FA Women's Premier League National Division
- Season: 2009–10
- Champions: Arsenal
- Promoted: Arsenal; Everton; Chelsea; Doncaster Rovers Belles; Birmingham City; Bristol Academy
- Champions League: Arsenal; Everton
- Matches: 132
- Goals: 451 (3.42 per match)
- Top goalscorer: Kim Little (22)
- Biggest away win: Nottingham Forest 0–8 Arsenal (15 October 2009)
- Highest scoring: Arsenal 8–1 Doncaster Roves Belles (11 October 2009)

Locations of the FA Women's Premier League National Division Teams
Locations of the FA Women's Premier League National Division Teams (Greater London)

Changes from last season:

- Sunderland were promoted from the Northern Division
- Millwall Lionesses were promoted from the Southern Division
- Liverpool were relegated to the Northern Division
- Fulham were relegated to the Southern Division

=== League table ===
Pos	Team	Pld	W	D	L	GF	GA	GD	Pts	Qualification or relegation
1	Arsenal (C, P)	22	20	1	1	79	19	+60	61	Qualification for the Champion League knockout phase Approved for FA WSL
2	Everton (P)	22	16	2	4	67	19	+48	50	Qualification for the Champions League qualifying round Approved for FA WSL
3	Chelsea (P)	22	16	1	5	60	27	+33	49	Approved for FA WSL
4	Leeds Carnegie	22	15	2	5	50	16	+34	47	
5	Sunderland	22	12	1	9	36	35	+1	37	
6	Doncaster Rovers Belles (P)	22	9	7	6	36	37	−1	34	Approved for FA WSL
7	Blackburn Rovers	22	7	3	12	27	45	−18	24	
8	Millwall Lionesses	22	6	3	13	24	43	−19	21	
9	Watford	22	4	5	13	23	60	−37	17	
10	Birmingham City (P)	22	4	4	14	21	41	−20	16	Approved for FA WSL
11	Nottingham Forest	22	3	4	15	16	51	−35	13	
12	Bristol Academy (P)	22	3	1	18	12	58	−46	10	Approved for FA WSL

Updated to match(es) played on 17 May 2010. Source: FA WPL
(C) Champions; (P) Promoted

=== Results ===
Home \ Away	ARS	BIR	BLA	BRI	CHE	DON	EVE	LEE	MIL	NOT	SUN	WAT
Arsenal	—	4–1	8–0	8–0	2–1	8–1	4–2	3–0	5–1	4–1	5–1	6–2
Birmingham City	0–1	—	0–1	4–0	1–4	0–1	0–3	0–4	1–0	1–0	0–2	4–0
Blackburn Rovers	1–1	1–1	—	2–1	0–3	1–5	0–2	0–2	2–4	0–1	0–3	4–2
Bristol Academy	1–4	1–0	0–1	—	0–4	1–2	0–5	0–4	0–2	0–1	0–2	2–0
Chelsea	2–3	3–0	4–1	4–2	—	0–2	2–5	2–0	3–1	1–0	3–1	3–1
Doncaster Rovers Belles	1–2	3–1	1–1	2–0	2–2	—	1–1	1–4	2–2	1–1	2–1	2–2
Everton	0–1	2–0	3–1	3–0	3–5	4–0	—	1–3	2–1	6–0	4–0	5–0
Leeds Carnegie	0–1	4–2	3–2	4–0	0–1	2–0	1–1	—	1–0	1–0	1–2	6–0
Millwall Lionesses	1–3	0–0	0–2	2–0	0–4	2–0	0–5	0–4	—	1–0	1–2	4–2
Nottingham Forest	0–8	2–2	1–2	1–2	1–2	2–4	0–2	0–5	1–1	—	0–3	1–3
Sunderland	2–1	3–1	1–2	2–1	2–0	0–3	0–4	0–0	2–1	2–3	—	4–1
Watford	0–1	2–2	3–2	1–1	0–7	0–0	0–4	0–1	2–0	0–0	2–1	—

Source: FA WPL
Legend: Blue = home team win; Yellow = draw; Red = away team win.

=== Top scorers ===
Rank	Player	Team	Goals
1	(Scotland) Kim Little	Arsenal	22
2	(England) Natasha Dowie	Everton	14
2	(England) Ellen White	Leeds Carnegie	14
4	(England) Carla Cantrell	Leeds Carnegie	12
5	(England) Gemma Davison	Arsenal	10
5	(England) Dunia Susi	Chelsea	10

== Northern Division ==
FA Women's Premier League Northern Division
- Season: 2009–10
- Champions: Liverpool
- Promoted: Liverpool; OOH Lincoln
- Relegated: Sheffield Wednesday; Luton Town
- Matches: 132
- Goals: 556 (4.21 per match)
- Biggest home win: Preston North End 7–1 Luton Town (29 November 2009)
- Biggest away win: Luton Town 0–6 Preston North End (9 May 2010)
- Highest scoring: Liverpool 7–2 Derby County (27 September 2009)

Map showing the locations of the teams in the Northern Division of the FA Women's Premier League
Map showing the locations of the teams in the Northern Division of the FA Women's Premier League

Changes from last season:

- Sunderland were promoted to the National Division
- Leeds City Vixens were promoted from the Northern Combination League
- Derby County were promoted from the Midlands Combination League
- Luton Town were promoted from the South East combination League
- Tranmere Rovers were relegated to the Northern Combination League
- Rotherham United were relegated to the Midland Combination League
- Reading were moved to the Southern Division

=== League table ===
Pos	Team	Pld	W	D	L	GF	GA	GD	Pts	Promotion or relegation
1	Liverpool (C, P)	22	19	2	1	59	19	+40	59	Approved for FA WSL
2	OOH Lincoln (P)	22	15	4	3	46	22	+24	49	Approved for FA WSL
3	Leicester City	22	11	6	5	53	35	+18	39	
4	Manchester City	22	10	6	6	36	25	+11	36	
5	Curzon Ashton	22	9	4	9	37	39	−2	31	
6	Aston Villa	22	7	8	7	37	35	+2	29	
7	Leeds City Vixens	22	9	2	11	41	48	−7	29	
8	Newcastle United	22	7	6	9	38	48	−10	27	
9	Preston North End	22	6	6	10	56	54	+2	24	
10	Derby County	22	5	5	12	30	51	−21	20	
11	Sheffield Wednesday (R)	22	4	6	12	29	50	−21	18	Relegation to the Northern Combination League
12	Luton Town (R)	22	1	3	18	12	48	−36	6	Relegation to the South East Combination League

Updated to match(es) played on 17 May 2010. Source: FA WPL
(C) Champions; (P) Promoted; (R) Relegated

=== Results ===
Home \ Away	ASV	CUA	DEC	LCV	LEC	LIC	LIV	LUT	MCI	NEU	PNE	SHW
Aston Villa	—	3–1	2–3	1–0	1–1	1–1	1–2	2–0	0–2	0–2	2–1	2–2
Curzon Ashton	1–1	—	3–0	2–1	0–3	1–3	1–1	H–W	0–2	6–1	2–2	2–1
Derby County	1–4	1–2	—	3–0	1–1	0–1	0–4	2–2	0–2	1–1	3–2	3–1
Leeds City Vixens	4–2	2–3	3–0	—	1–3	0–4	1–5	3–1	1–1	2–6	3–0	1–1
Leicester City	1–1	5–2	2–2	2–1	—	2–2	0–2	5–0	0–3	4–3	5–0	4–1
OOH Lincoln	2–1	2–0	4–0	1–2	2–1	—	1–2	H–W	1–0	3–1	2–2	4–1
Liverpool	2–0	3–1	7–2	5–3	2–0	4–1	—	2–0	1–2	0–0	4–0	1–0
Luton Town	1–2	0–3	2–1	1–2	0–3	A–W	0–2	—	0–1	1–2	0–6	1–1
Manchester City	3–3	1–1	2–0	2–3	3–4	1–1	1–2	H–W	—	1–2	2–2	4–0
Newcastle United	0–3	2–1	2–2	3–0	2–3	0–4	1–2	2–2	0–1	—	2–2	2–0
Preston North End	4–4	1–3	4–2	1–3	3–3	0–3	2–3	7–1	3–1	9–3	—	4–1
Sheffield Wednesday	1–1	4–2	0–3	1–5	3–1	3–4	2–3	2–0	1–1	1–1	2–1	—

Source: FA WPL
Legend: Blue = home team win; Yellow = draw; Red = away team win.

== Southern Division ==
FA Women's Premier League Southern Division
- Season: 2009–10
- Champions: Barnet
- Promoted: Barnet; Reading
- Relegated: Fulham; Crystal Palace
- Matches: 132
- Goals: 419 (3.17 per match)
- Biggest home win: Queen's Park Rangers 9–1 Fulham (18 October 2009)
- Biggest away win: Fulham 0–6 Cardiff City (9 May 2010)
- Highest scoring: Queen's Park Rangers; 9–2 Colchester United (30 August 2009)

Map showing the locations of the teams in the Southern Division of the FA Women's Premier League
Map showing the locations of the teams in the Southern Division of the FA Women's Premier League

Changes from last season:

- Millwall Lionesses were promoted to the National Division
- Queens Park Rangers were promoted from the South East Combination League
- Fulham were relegated from the National Division
- Ipswich Town were relegated to the South East Combination League
- Truro City were relegated to the South West Combination League
- Reading were moved from the Northern Division

=== League table ===
Pos	Team	Pld	W	D	L	GF	GA	GD	Pts	Promotion or relegation
1	Barnet (C, P)	22	16	4	2	53	18	+35	52	Promotion to the National Division
2	Reading (P)	22	13	5	4	43	28	+15	44	Promotion to the National Division
3	Keynsham Town	22	12	5	5	55	36	+19	41	
4	Portsmouth	22	11	6	5	42	32	+10	39	
5	West Ham United	22	9	9	4	38	24	+14	36	
6	Cardiff City	22	10	5	7	44	32	+12	35	
7	Charlton Athletic	22	10	4	8	24	20	+4	34	
8	Brighton & Hove Albion	22	6	8	8	33	33	0	26	
9	Colchester United	22	6	5	11	19	40	−21	23	
10	Queen's Park Rangers	22	5	5	12	42	43	−1	20	
11	Fulham (R)	22	2	2	18	14	63	−49	8	Club folded at the end of the season
12	Crystal Palace (R)	22	1	4	17	12	50	−38	7	Relegation to the South East Combination League

Updated to match(es) played on 17 May 2010. Source: FA WPL
(C) Champions; (P) Promoted; (R) Relegated

Fulham folded at the end of the season after the withdrawal of their sponsors.

=== Results ===
Home \ Away	BAR	BHA	CAR	CHA	COU	CRY	FUL	KET	POR	QPR	REA	WHU
Barnet	—	2–0	3–1	0–0	5–0	2–1	5–1	6–3	1–1	3–0	5–1	3–0
Brighton & Hove Albion	0–1	—	2–1	1–2	3–1	1–1	5–0	2–6	1–1	2–2	2–3	1–1
Cardiff City	2–5	0–3	—	2–1	3–0	2–0	4–0	3–3	3–2	2–1	1–0	2–2
Charlton Athletic	0–1	0–0	1–0	—	2–1	3–0	1–0	1–2	1–1	1–0	0–2	1–0
Colchester United	0–2	2–1	0–0	0–1	—	0–0	3–0	2–1	1–4	2–1	0–3	0–0
Crystal Palace	1–2	0–2	1–1	0–3	0–3	—	0–1	1–3	0–1	1–4	0–5	1–2
Fulham	0–2	2–2	0–6	0–2	A–W	3–3	—	1–4	1–2	0–1	1–2	0–3
Keynsham Town	2–1	0–1	2–2	3–1	3–1	2–0	3–0	—	5–1	3–3	2–1	2–2
Portsmouth	1–2	2–1	1–4	2–1	1–0	4–0	2–1	2–0	—	5–2	1–2	0–0
Queen's Park Rangers	1–1	1–1	0–2	1–0	9–2	0–1	9–1	0–1	2–4	—	2–3	1–3
Reading	1–1	1–1	2–1	1–1	1–1	1–0	3–0	4–3	2–2	3–1	—	1–3
West Ham United	2–0	4–1	3–2	3–1	0–0	5–1	1–2	1–1	2–2	1–1	0–1	—

Source: FA WPL
Legend: Blue = home team win; Yellow = draw; Red = away team win.
