= Amy McCann (footballer) =

English-born Northern Irish footballer

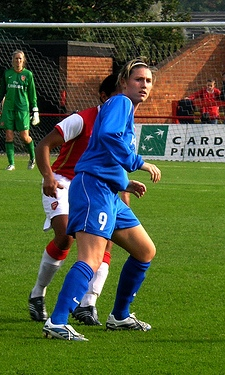

Personal information
- Full name: Amy McCann
- Date of birth: 26 October 1983 (age 42)
- Place of birth: Walsall, England
- Position: Striker

Senior career*
Years	Team	Apps	(Gls)
–2005	Wolves Women		
2005–2006	Everton Ladies		
2006–2010	Birmingham City Ladies		
2009–2010	→ Wolves Women (loan)		
2010–2011	Leicester City Women		
2011	Barnet Ladies		

International career
2008–	Northern Ireland		
- * Club domestic league appearances and goals as of 17:40, 10 December 2007 (UTC)

Amy McCann (born 26 October 1983) is an English–born Northern Irish footballer, who has represented clubs including Wolverhampton Wanderers Women, Everton and Birmingham City Ladies as a striker. McCann has played for Northern Ireland at senior international level.

== Club career ==
McCann's 21 goals for Wolves won the golden boot in 2004–05, as the club finished runners–up to Sunderland Women in the FA Women's Premier League Northern Division.

After a season with Everton, McCann signed for Birmingham City in 2006. During 2009–10 she returned to Wolves on dual–signing terms, to regain fitness after the birth of her child.

== International career ==
McCann was called up to a Northern Ireland training camp in November 2007, after Birmingham City's programme editor alerted them to her eligibility. McCann's grandfather Henry was from Portadown.

She made her international debut on 16 February 2008, as a 77th-minute substitute in a 4–0 defeat in Spain.

== Personal life ==
McCann is a season ticket holder at Walsall F.C.
