= AFC Wimbledon Women =

- Badge
- Full name: AFC Wimbledon Women
- Nicknames: The Dons, The Wombles
- Founded: 2003
- Ground: Imperial Fields; Plough Lane (selected matches)
- Chairman: David Growns
- Manager: Sabiha Jamal
- League: FA Women's National League South
- 2025–26: FA Women's National League South, 10th of 12
Home colours	Away colours	Third colours

AFC Wimbledon Women is a women's football team from London. The team currently competes in the FA Women's National League South.

The club was founded after the ladies team representing Wimbledon F.C. decided to transfer to AFC Wimbledon, after the old club's relocation. The ladies team of Fulham F.C., known as Friends of Fulham, started its bonds with the name Wimbledon, when they voted yes on the decision to transfer to Wimbledon F.C., as a new entity. AFC Wimbledon Ladies are now owned by The Dons Trust.

From 2003 to 2006 it was one of the few Women's Premier League sides not to be affiliated with a club from the male Premiership or Football League.

On Sunday 24 October 2021, AFC Wimbledon beat Walton Casuals 7–1 in the FA Cup 3rd qualifying round in their first game at the club's main Plough Lane Stadium.

Founded as AFC Wimbledon Ladies, the club rebranded to 'AFC Wimbledon Women' before the 2022–23 season.

In April 2024, the club were confirmed champions of Division One South East, securing promotion to Premier Division South for the 2024–25 season.

The first ever kit exclusively created for the women's team was announced on 24 July, 2026.

== Current squad ==
As of 20 August 2026

Note: Flags indicate national team as defined under FIFA eligibility rules; some limited exceptions apply. Players may hold more than one non-FIFA nationality.

No.	Pos.	Nation	Player
1	GK	ENG	Anna Prawer
2	DF	ENG	Rosie Russell
4	MF	USA	Iola Cotter
5	DF	ENG	Georgia Robert
6	DF	ENG	Hannah Plumb
7	FW	ENG	Emily Taylor-Brown
8	DF	ENG	Kate Jeffery
10	MF	ENG	Ellie Dorey (Captain)
11	FW	ENG	Ella-Mai Coutts
14	DF	ENG	Madi Parsonson
15	MF	ENG	Poppy Wright

No.	Pos.	Nation	Player
16	FW	ENG	Lauren Purchase
19	MF	ENG	Madi Hotston
21	FW	ENG	Tecia Ledwidge
22	DF	ENG	Emily Wallace
26	GK	ENG	Lauren Allen
27	GK	ENG	Beth Yarrow
28	DF	ENG	Willow Scales
29	MF	ENG	Kyra Hilmi
30	MF	ENG	Lola Lyndsay-Fynn
99	FW	GHA	Freda Ayisi

== Management ==
=== Current management and coaching staff ===
Name	Role
(England) Sabiha Jamal	Manager
(England) Andy May	Assistant Manager
(England) Quentin Hoad	First-Team Coach
(England) George Aires	Goalkeeper Coach
(England) Derek Isichei	Physiotherapist
(England) Sam Head	Strength & Conditioning Coach
(England) George Jones	Kit Man

== Performance ==
Season	Division	Position	Notes
2003-04	FA Women's National League Southern Division	3rd	
2004-05	FA Women's National League Southern Division	5th	
2005-06	FA Women's National League Southern Division	7th	
2006-07	FA Women's National League Southern Division	11th	Relegated
2007-08	South East Combination Women's Football League	11th	Relegated
2008-09	London and South East Women's Regional Football League	6th	
2009-10	London and South East Women's Regional Football League	10th	
2010-11	London and South East Women's Regional Football League	11th	
2011-12	London and South East Women's Regional Football League	7th	
2012-13	London and South East Women's Regional Football League	9th	
2013-14	London and South East Women's Regional Football League	10th	
2014-15	London and South East Women's Regional Football League	3rd	
2015-16	London and South East Women's Regional Football League	1st	Promoted as Champions
2016-17	FA Women's Premier League Division One South East	3rd	
2017-18	FA Women's Premier League Division One South East	2nd	
2018-19	FA Women's National League Division One South East	6th	League rebranded following a restructure of the women's football pyramid
2019-20	FA Women's National League Division One South East	2nd	Season curtailed early due to COVID-19 pandemic with no promotion or relegation
2020-21	FA Women's National League Division One South East	N/A	Season curtailed
2021-22	FA Women's National League Division One South East	3rd	Played first game at Plough Lane Stadium and reached final of FAWNL Plate
2022-23	FA Women's National League Division One South East	2nd	Reached final of the Capital Cup
2023-24	FA Women's National League Division One South East	1st	Promoted as Champions
2024-25	FA Women's National League South	7th	Moved primary home ground and training ground from Carshalton to Grand Drive, Raynes Park
2025-26	FA Women's National League South	10th	
