= Women's National League North =

Third-level English women's football league

FA Women's National League North
- Founded: 1991; 35 years ago
- Country: England
- Number of clubs: 12
- Level on pyramid: 3
- Promotion to: Women's Super League 2
- Relegation to: Division One North; Division One Midlands
- Domestic cup: Women's FA Cup
- League cups: National League Cup; National League Plate
- Current champions: Burnley (1st title) (2025–26)
- Most championships: Aston Villa; Blackburn Rovers (4 titles)
- Website: womenscompetitions.thefa.com
- Current: 2026–27 FA Women's National League

The Women's National League North, currently known as the FA Women's National League North, is a football league at the third tier of women's football in England. Together with the National League South, the two leagues form the highest division of the National League.

Established in 1991 as the WFA National League Northern Division, before a name change to the FA Premier League Northern Division in 1994, the league, along with the Southern Division, formed the second tier of women's football until 2010. The league champion was promoted to the National Division, while the bottom two teams were originally relegated to the regional leagues, prior to the introduction of the Combination Leagues in 1998. After the introduction of the Women's Super League, the National Division became the second tier, and the Northern and Southern Divisions became the third tier.

In 2014, the fourth tier Combination Leagues became part of the FA Women's Premier League. Rebranded as the Premier Leagues 'Division One', the champions of Division One North and Division One Midlands feed into the Northern Division. The league received its current name and branding in 2018.

== History ==
Originally known as the WFA National League Northern Division, Bronte were the inaugural second level champions. Liverpool, having won the 2009–10 season, became the last second level champions. After the introduction of the Women's Super League in 2011, the league became the third level of woman's football. Aston Villa won the 2010–11 season, becoming the first third level champions.

For the 2014–15 season, the Women's Premier League incorporated the fourth tier Combination Leagues as the Premier League's 'Division One', with Division One North and Division One Midlands feeding into the Northern Division. Promotion to the second tier was also reintroduced, with the winners of the Northern and Southern Divisions playing each other in a single play-off match at a neutral venue, the winner becoming the overall Women's Premier League/National League champion, and promoted to the WSL 2.

Prior to the 2018–19 season, the league was renamed as the FA Women's National League North, part of a complete rebrand of the women's pyramid. Blackburn Rovers won the inaugural edition of the rebranded league. On 1 May 2022, Division One North club Newcastle United set a new league attendance record of 22,134. The club beat their own record on 16 April 2023, with an attendance of 24,092. Beginning with the 2023–24 season, it was decided that both the Northern and Southern Division champions would be automatically promoted to the Championship.

== Clubs ==
The following twelve clubs are competing in the 2026–27 season.

Club	Home ground	Position 2025–26
Boldmere St. Michaels	The Amber Arena and Community Stadium, Sutton Coldfield	Division One Midlands, 2nd
Derby County	Don Amott Arena, Derby	8th
Huddersfield Town	The Stafflex Arena, Kirkburton	Division One; North, 1st
Hull City	Easy Buy Stadium, Barton-upon-Humber	9th
Liverpool Feds	Jericho Lane, Liverpool	7th
Loughborough Lightning	Loughborough University Stadium, Loughborough	10th
Middlesbrough	Bishopton Road West, Stockton	5th
Norwich City	The Nest, Horsford	Division One; South East, 2nd
Peterborough United	PIMS Park, Peterborough	Division One Midlands, 1st
Rugby Borough	Kilsby Lane, Rugby	3rd
Stoke City	Wellbeing Park, Yarnfield	4th
West Bromwich Albion	Valley Stadium, Redditch	6th

Location of clubs for the 2026–27 season

== Results ==
=== Northern Division ===
Season	Winner	Runner-up	Top scorer(s)	Goals (Note: League goals only.)
Tier 2
1991–92	Bronte	Sheffield Wednesday		
1992–93	Leasowe Pacific	Nottingham Argyle		
1993–94	Wolverhampton Wanderers	Sheffield Wednesday		
1994–95	Villa Aztecs	Cowgate Kestrels		
1995–96	Tranmere Rovers	Huddersfield Town		
1996–97	Bradford City	Aston Villa		
1997–98	Ilkeston Town	Garswood Saints	(England) Ali Kirk (Ilkeston Town)	25
1998–99	Aston Villa	Blyth Spartans Kestrels	(England) Lucy Ward (Leeds United)	21
1999–2000	Blyth Spartans Kestrels	Bangor City	(England) Melanie Reay (Blyth Spartans Kestrels)	23
2000–01	Leeds United	Oldham Curzon	(England) Kelly Dean (Oldham Curzon)	27
2001–02	Birmingham City	Wolverhampton Wanderers	(England) Katy Ward (Birmingham City)	
2002–03	Aston Villa	Sunderland	(England) Kelly Dean (Oldham Curzon) (England) Melanie Reay (Sunderland)	17
2003–04	Liverpool	Sunderland	(England) Kelly Dean (Oldham Curzon) (England) Melanie Reay (Sunderland)	18
2004–05	Sunderland	Wolverhampton Wanderers	(Northern Ireland) Amy McCann (Wolverhampton Wanderers)	20
2005–06	Blackburn Rovers	Liverpool	(England) Vicky Abbott (Tranmere Rovers)	21
2006–07	Liverpool	Lincoln City	(England) Jodie Michalska (Lincoln City) (England) Melanie Reay (Newcastle United)	18
2007–08	Nottingham Forest	Lincoln City	(England) Jodie Michalska (Lincoln City)	27
2008–09	Sunderland	Lincoln City	(England) Jodie Michalska (Lincoln City)	21
2009–10	Liverpool	Lincoln City	(Wales) Cheryl Foster (Liverpool)	16
Tier 3
2010–11	Aston Villa	Coventry City	(England) Natasha Meade (Leicester City)	15
2011–12	Manchester City	Sheffield	(England) Jodie Michalska (Sheffield)	18
2012–13	Sheffield	Nottingham Forest	(England) Jodie Michalska (Sheffield)	14
2013–14	Sheffield	Preston North End	(England) Jodie Michalska (Sheffield)	20
2014–15	Sheffield	Coventry City	(England) Jodie Michalska (Sheffield)	25
2015–16	Sporting Club Albion	Preston North End	(England) Emily Heckler (Huddersfield Town)	29
2016–17	Blackburn Rovers	Middlesbrough	(England) Bianca Owens (Middlesbrough)	20
2017–18	Blackburn Rovers	Leicester City	(England) Rosie Axten (Leicester City)	22
2018–19	Blackburn Rovers	Sunderland	(England) Saffron Jordan (Blackburn Rovers)	32
2019–20	Not awarded (COVID-19 pandemic)			
2020–21	Not awarded (COVID-19 pandemic)			
2021–22	Wolverhampton Wanderers	Derby County	(England) Ellie Gilliatt (Derby County) (England) Evie Priestley (Burnley) (England) Faye McCoy (Fylde)	16
2022–23	Nottingham Forest	Wolverhampton Wanderers	(England) Amy Sims (Derby County)	18
2023–24	Newcastle United	Burnley	(England) Charlotte Greengrass (Huddersfield Town)	13
2024–25	Nottingham Forest	Wolverhampton Wanderers	(England) Charlotte Greengrass (Wolverhampton Wanderers)	21
2025–26	Burnley	Wolverhampton Wanderers	(England) Amber Hughes (Wolverhampton Wanderers) (England) Millie Ravening (Burnley)	19

=== Division One ===
Season	Division One North	Runners-up
2014–15	Guiseley Vixens	Liverpool Feds
2015–16	Middlesbrough	Liverpool Feds
2016–17	Guiseley Vixens	Liverpool Feds
2017–18	Hull City	Brighouse Town
2018–19	Burnley	Brighouse Town
2019–20	Not awarded (COVID-19 pandemic)	
2020–21	Not awarded (COVID-19 pandemic)	
2021–22	Liverpool Feds	Newcastle United
2022–23	Newcastle United	Durham Cestria
2023–24	Hull City	Middlesbrough
2024–25	Middlesbrough	Cheadle Town
2025–26	Huddersfield Town	Cheadle Town

Season	Division One Midlands	Runners-up
2014–15	Loughborough Foxes	Leicester City
2015–16	Leicester City	Wolverhampton Wanderers
2016–17	Wolverhampton Wanderers	Loughborough Foxes
2017–18	Loughborough Foxes	Burton Albion
2018–19	West Bromwich Albion	Wolverhampton Wanderers
2019–20	Not awarded (COVID-19 pandemic)	
2020–21	Not awarded (COVID-19 pandemic)	
2021–22	Boldmere St. Michaels	Doncaster Rovers
2022–23	Stourbridge	Doncaster Rovers
2023–24	Sporting Khalsa	Loughborough Lightning
2024–25	Loughborough Lightning	Northampton Town
2025–26	Peterborough United	Boldmere St. Michaels

== See also ==
- Women's association football
- List of women's football teams
- List of women's football (soccer) competitions
