= Stockport County Ladies F.C. =

Football club, founded 1989

Stockport County
- Full name: Stockport County Ladies Football Club
- Nickname: The Hatters
- Founded: 1989; 36 years ago
- Ground: Stockport Sports Village
- Capacity: 2,384 (192 seated)
- Manager: Steve O'Hara
- League: FA Women's National League Division One North
- 2024–25: FA Women's National League Division One North, 7th of 12
- Website: https://stockportcountylfc.com/
Home colours	Away colours	Third colours

Stockport County Ladies Football Club is an English women's football club. Founded in 1989, the club currently play in the FA Women's National League Division One North, with home games played at Stockport Sports Village.

== History ==
Stockport County Ladies Football Club was founded in 1989/90 as Stockport County F.C then breaking away from Stockport County becoming an independent club called Stockport Ladies after the first season, the club remerged with Stockport County in 2000/2001.

Stockport won the 2002–03 Northern Combination, and were promoted to the FA Women's Premier League Northern Division. The club spent five seasons in the Northern Division, before relegation back to the Northern Combination at the end of the 2007–08 season.

Stockport won the 2018–19 North West Regional Premier Division, and were promoted to the FA Women's National League Division One North. In January 2022 Steve O'Hara was announced as manager.

== Honours ==
League

- Northern Combination Football League (level 3)
  - Champions: 2002–03
- North West Regional Premier Division (level 5)
  - Champions: 2018–19
