= Enfield Town L.F.C. =

Enfield Town
- Full name: Enfield Town Ladies Football Club
- Ground: Queen Elizabeth II Stadium, Enfield
- Capacity: 2,500
- Chairman: Lisa Quinlan-Rahman
- Manager: Leo Green
- League: London and South East Women's Regional Football League
- 2021–22: FA Women's National League Division One South East, 10th of 13 (relegated)
Home colours

Enfield Town Ladies Football Club are a women's association football club, affiliated to Enfield Town F.C. They are members of the Eastern Region Women's Football League Premier Division (Tier 5 of the Women's football pyramid).

They play their home games at Enfield Town's Queen Elizabeth II Stadium.

In 2016 they reached the final of the Premier League Plate under the management of Greek Cypriot footballer Kyri Neocleous., their first ever national cup final. They participated in The Women’s National League, Division 1 South East until 2022.

Enfield Town Ladies FC offer a pathway for young girls in the community, boasting a number of teams from Under 8’s to First Team.

== Youth teams ==
Enfield Town Ladies have a youth section with teams for girls from under-8 to under-16 levels with a pathway to the First Team.
