= Sheffield Wednesday Ladies F.C. =

Sheffield Wednesday Ladies
- Full name: Sheffield Wednesday Ladies Football Club
- Founded: 1971
- Ground: Jubilee Sports & Social Club
- League: North East Regional Women's Football League Division One South
- 2024-25: North East Regional Women's Football League Division One South, 8th of 11
Home colours	Away colours	Third colours

Sheffield Wednesday Ladies Football Club are a women's football club based in South Yorkshire, England. They play their home games at the Jubilee Sports Ground, and the first team currently competes in the North East Regional Women's Football League Division One South.

As of 2026, Sheffield Wednesday Ladies and the men's team, Sheffield Wednesday F.C., are legally separate entities. However, the new ownership of the men's team have announced plans to bring the two entities together again.

== History ==
The team, originally called Star Ladies, were formed at the Star Inn Public House in Rotherham in 1971 following a charity match between men and women at the pub. Shortly afterwards the side joined the Sheffield Ladies League. When this league was disbanded they joined the Nottinghamshire Ladies League which was later renamed the East Midlands Ladies League.

They took the name Sheffield Wednesday Ladies in 1985 and when the Women's Football Association (WFA) created the Women's Premier League in 1991 the club became founder members. After relegation in 2005, the Owls returned back to the top flight as champions of the Northern Combination in 2007.

On 26 September 2009 Daniel Duke resigned as Head Coach due to the Owls' poor start to the season. He was replaced by Luton Town footballer Andy Burgess, who installed Liam Kelly has his assistant. Kelly left after two weeks, citing work commitments.

Burgess then resigned in early 2010 and was replaced by his former assistant. Under Liam Kelly the club finished 11th in the 2009–10 Premier League Northern Division, in the second relegation place. Kelly left at the end of the season.

SWLFC were relegated at the end of the season, mainly due to bad results and team changes forced upon them by the constant managerial roundabout. Chairman Jeff Maslin decided the club needed stability to give SWLFC a better chance of promotion straight back to the FAPWL. Adam Smallman was appointed in the pre-season and started rebuilding the squad. Some departures and some arrivals has heralded a new look squad.

After the 2011–12 season due to financial constraints the club folded and The Junior section of Sheffield Wednesday Ladies took over the Women's mantle continuing with the original Ladies name and currently occupying a position for 2015/16 in the North East regional Women's League after being promoted in 2nd place from the SHWCFL and prior to that as champions of the SHWCFL Division Two in their first season of adult football. They also now have a Reserve and a Development team that play in the Sheffield and Hallamshire First division.

== Notable former players ==
- (England) Sarah Begg
- (England) Vicky Exley
- (England) Melanie Garside-Wight
- (England) Leanne Hall
- (England) Jo Potter
- (England) Lesley Sands

Shirley Dale [Garnham ]

== Honours ==
Honour	Year(s)
East Midlands Ladies League Champions	1991
East Midlands Ladies League Cup Winners	1991
East Midlands Ladies Division 2 Champions	1982
Sheffield & Hallamshire County Cup Winners	1999, 2000, 2007
Sheffield & Hallamshire County Cup Runners-Up	2004, 2006, 2008
Northern Combination Women's Football League Winners	2007
Umbro International Cup Winners	2009
Sheffield & Hallamshire women's County League Division Two Champions	2011
Sheffield & Hallamshire Women & Girls League Shield Winners	24/25

=== Records ===
Record Win: 26–1 v Fishtoft, East Midlands Ladies League, 1981

Record Defeat: 0–22 v Doncaster Belles, FA Women's Cup, 1979
