= Curzon Ashton L.F.C. =

Curzon Ashton FC Women
- Full name: Curzon Ashton FC Women
- Nickname(s): The Nashettes
- Founded: 1988 (as Oldham Athletic LFC)
- Ground: Tameside Stadium
- Capacity: 4,000
- Manager: Dean O'Brien
- League: North West Women's Regional Football League Premier
- 2022–23: North West Women's Regional Football League Premier, 4th of 11
Home colours	Away colours

Curzon Ashton FC Women is an English women's football club affiliated with Curzon Ashton F.C. The club were known as Oldham Curzon Ladies Football Club. They play in the North West Women's Regional Football League Premier. The club also has youth teams from U10s and a reserve team. They also host the Greater Manchester girl's Centre of Excellence.

== History ==
The club was founded in 1988 as Oldham Athletic Ladies FC and began playing in the North West women's league in 1990. Several promotions were won over the following seasons and the club set up youth squads. In 1998 they moved to Ashton-under-Lyne and changed their name to Oldham Curzon Ladies FC.

A third-placed finish followed in 1998–99, in the club's first season in the Northern Combination. Then in 1999-00 Oldham Curzon won the Northern Combination and promotion to the Premier League Northern Division.

In 2000–01 Oldham Curzon were runners-up to Leeds United, then they finished third in the following two seasons. Performances did not improve and the club flirted with relegation in 2005–06 and dropped back into the Northern Combination in 2007.

Curzon Ashton won the 2007–08 Northern Combination and sealed the title with a 15–0 home win over Hull City Ladies. Mark Bradshaw took over as manager and led the club to Premier League Northern Division safety that season.

In 2008–09 they finished in tenth place in the FA Women's Premier League Northern Division, two points clear of relegation.

After a difficult run of seasons and relegation, the club entered into the North West Women's Regional Premier League. An all-new management and team began a fresh era for the Ladies, and an all-new ethos began. Curzon Ashton Ladies now look to draw on previous success and build a solid and secure future for the club.

== Colours and badge ==
The playing colours of Curzon Ashton Ladies are identical to those of Curzon Ashton men.

== Stadium ==
In summer 2005 the club moved into the £4m Tameside Stadium, a Conference compliant stadium including a separate third-generation full-size all-weather facility. The ground was built for the club by Tameside MBC assisted by a £500,000 grant from The Football Foundation. Currently the squad play home games on the 3G astro turf pitch within the Tameside Stadium

== Current squad ==
Players used in season 2021/22

Note: Flags indicate national team as defined under FIFA eligibility rules; some limited exceptions apply. Players may hold more than one non-FIFA nationality.

No.	Pos.	Nation	Player
—	MF	(England) ENG	Molly Barton
—	MF	(England) ENG	Lauren Beckford
—	DF	(England) ENG	Abigail Bleasdale
—	ST	(England) ENG	Amy Smith
—	GK	(England) ENG	Megan Brett
—	DF	(England) ENG	Olivia Chan
—	MF	(England) ENG	Lucia Cicchirillo
—	DF	(England) ENG	Jessica Cooke
—	MF	(England) ENG	Sophie D’lorio
—	ST	(England) ENG	Simone Drummond
—	ST	(England) ENG	Leoni Harland
—	DF	(England) ENG	Elisha James
—	MF	(England) ENG	Erin Longsden
—	MF	(England) ENG	Tiffany Lunn
—	GK	(England) ENG	Grace Murphy
—	DF	(Norway) NOR	Ingvlid Tveit
—	MF/DF	(England) ENG	Stephanie Upsall
—	MF	(England) ENG	Philippa Wakefield
—	GK	(England) ENG	Alexandra Belinda Moon

== Notable former players ==
- (England) Kay Hawke

== Honours ==
- FA Women's Premier League Northern Division:
  - Runners-up (1): 2000–01
