= Frogham, Kent =

Hamlet in Kent, England

Coordinates: 51.2092°N 1.2295°E

Frogham
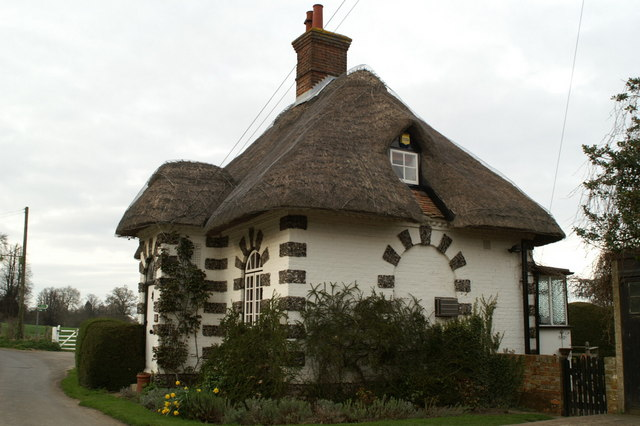
- A thatched lodge in Frogham

- Location within Kent
- District: Dover
- Shire county: Kent
- Region: South East
- Country: England
- Sovereign state: United Kingdom
- Post town: Dover
- Postcode district: CT15 7
- Police: Kent
- Fire: Kent
- Ambulance: South East Coast

Frogham is a hamlet in the Dover District of East Kent, England, 7 miles (11 km) north west of Dover. It is located between the former coal mining village of Aylesham and Shepherdswell. It is near the site of the former Snowdown colliery. In published statistics, the population of the hamlet is included in the civil parish of Nonington.
