= Frogham =

Frogham may refer to:

- Frogham, Hampshire, United Kingdom
- Frogham, Kent, United Kingdom
