= 2004–05 in English football =

Football in England
- Season: 2004–05

Men's football
- FA Premier League: Chelsea
- Championship: Sunderland
- League One: Luton Town
- League Two: Yeovil Town
- Conference National: Barnet
- FA Cup: Arsenal
- League Cup: Chelsea
- Community Shield: Arsenal

Women's football
- Premier League National Division: Arsenal
- Premier League Northern Division: Sunderland
- Premier League Southern Division: Chelsea
- FA Women's Cup: Charlton Athletic
- Premier League Cup: Arsenal

The 2004–05 season was the 125th season of competitive football in England.

== Overview ==
- 2004–05 was the first season to feature the rebranded Football League. The First Division, Second Division and Third Division were renamed the Football League Championship, Football League One and Football League Two respectively. Coca-Cola replaced the Nationwide Building Society as title sponsor.
- The former Wimbledon F.C. was reformed and competed in League One, under their new name of Milton Keynes Dons.
- There were also changes in the Football Conference with the introduction of two new regional divisions below Conference National: Conference North and Conference South. Furthermore, the Conference League Cup returned, now featuring the teams from the new divisions.
- Unlike the Football League and the Conference, the Premier League did not undergo any restructuring, but Barclays Bank replaced their subsidiary Barclaycard as title sponsors.
- Wigan Athletic reached the Premiership as Championship runners-up. They had been elected to the Football League only 27 years earlier, had been the league's fourth lowest club 11 years earlier and until two years before reaching the Premiership they had never played in the upper half of the English league.
- Nottingham Forest were relegated from the Championship to League One, becoming the first former European Cup winners to slide into the third tier of their domestic league – having won two-straight European Cups a quarter of a century earlier. Just ten years ago, they had finished third in the Premiership and reached the following season's UEFA Cup quarter-finals.

== Diary of the season ==
- 1 July 2004 – Chelsea pay £13.2 million for Porto's Paulo Ferreira and £12 million for PSV Eindhoven's Arjen Robben. Liverpool buy Djibril Cissé from Auxerre for £14 million.
- 7 July 2004 – The Sun newspaper issues an apology to Liverpool fans over its infamous front-page story about the Hillsborough disaster 15 years ago, but the apology is not welcomed by many of the club's supporters; a poll on the club's official website shows an 87% disapproval rate of the newspaper's apology.
- 8 July 2004 – Middlesbrough sign Leeds United striker Mark Viduka for £4.5 million.
- 12 July 2004 – Chelsea sign Serbian striker Mateja Kežman from PSV Eindhoven for £5 million.
- 20 July 2004 – Chelsea pay a club record £24 million for Ivorian striker Didier Drogba from Marseille and also sign midfielder Tiago from Benfica for £8 million.
- 27 July 2004 – Chelsea sign Porto defender Ricardo Carvalho for £19.85 million.
- 29 July 2004 – Nicky Butt leaves Manchester United, where he has spent his whole career, and joins Newcastle United for £2.5 million.
- 30 July 2004 – West Bromwich Albion sign Hungarian midfielder Zoltán Gera from Ferencvaros for £1.5 million.
- 1 August 2004 – Liverpool sign Xabi Alonso from Real Sociedad for £10.5 million and Luis García from Barcelona for £6 million.
- 8 August 2004 – Arsenal claim the first silverware of the season when they beat Manchester United 3–1 to win the FA Community Shield.
- 9 August 2004 – West Bromwich Albion striker Lee Hughes is jailed for six years for causing death by dangerous driving in November 2003; his contract with the club is terminated.
- 15 August 2004 – Liverpool sell Michael Owen to Real Madrid for £8 million.
- 20 August 2004 – Newcastle United sell Jonathan Woodgate to Real Madrid for £13.4 million.
- 23 August 2004 – Southampton manager Paul Sturrock parts company with the club after just five months in charge. Saints Chairman Rupert Lowe claimed that media speculation had proved too much for Sturrock to take, despite allegations that he himself placed much pressure on Sturrock. Coach Steve Wigley takes over, though it is anticipated that the appointment will not be permanent.
- 25 August 2004 – With a 3–0 home win over Blackburn Rovers, Arsenal sets the all-time record for consecutive unbeaten league matches at England's top level, with 43. The record was previously held by Nottingham Forest, with 42 from November 1977 to September 1978.
- 30 August 2004 – Newcastle United manager Sir Bobby Robson is sacked after a poor start to the Premier League season amid reports of dressing-room discontent. His assistant John Carver takes over as caretaker manager.
- 31 August 2004 – Wayne Rooney, at 18 years of age, leaves Everton for Manchester United in a £27 million deal, a world record for a teenager. He joins a United side who have finished the first month of the league season in ninth place. Meanwhile, the Premier League leaders are defending champions Arsenal who are level on points with second-placed Chelsea – both have won all four games so far this season. Bolton Wanderers, Tottenham Hotspur and Middlesbrough complete the top five. Crystal Palace, Blackburn Rovers and Norwich City complete the bottom three. In the newly named Football League Championship, Wigan Athletic are top of the table and level on points with Stoke City. Ipswich Town, who lost in the playoffs last season, occupy third place. Plymouth Argyle, newly promoted and at this level for the first time in 13 years, stand fourth. Reading and Sheffield United complete the top six.
- 6 September 2004 – Graeme Souness resigns as manager of Blackburn Rovers to take over at Newcastle United. He officially takes over on 13 September, after the two clubs played each other for the first time in the season.
- 30 September 2004 – September draws to a close with Arsenal still top of the Premier League and now two points ahead of Chelsea, with Everton, Bolton Wanderers and Manchester United completing the top five. Crystal Palace, Norwich City and West Bromwich Albion occupy the bottom three places. Reading have taken over as Championship leaders at the expense of Wigan Athletic, who now stand second. The playoff zone is occupied by Ipswich Town, Queens Park Rangers, Stoke City and Watford. Pre-season promotion favourites Sunderland and West Ham United are edged out of the playoff zone on goal difference.
- 2 October 2004 – West Bromwich Albion beat Bolton to secure their first league win of the campaign, exiting the relegation zone as a result. In the Championship, Wigan go back to the top of the table with a win over bottom club Rotherham United, and Teddy Sheringham scores his 250th league goal with the winner for West Ham United against Wolves.
- 3 October 2004 – Chelsea beat Liverpool 1–0 at Stamford Bridge and extend their run of not losing a match under José Mourinho, while Newcastle United go four unbeaten since Bobby Robson's departure with a draw at Birmingham City.
- 24 October 2004 – Arsenal's record streak of unbeaten top-flight league matches ends at 49 after a 2–0 away loss to Manchester United.
- 26 October 2004 – Gary Megson is dismissed as manager of West Bromwich Albion after he notifies the club he will not extend his contract past the current season.
- 29 October 2004 – Chelsea cancels the contract of striker Adrian Mutu after he tests positive for cocaine.
- 31 October 2004 – Arsenal lead the Premier League on goal difference ahead of Chelsea, while Everton's surprise title challenge is continuing as they occupy third place with just a three-point margin keeping them off the top. Middlesbrough and Bolton Wanderers complete the top five, with Liverpool and Manchester United – among the pre-season title favourites – sixth and seventh respectively. Norwich City, Blackburn Rovers and Southampton occupy the bottom three. Wigan Athletic are still top of the Championship, with Ipswich Town now second. The playoff zone is occupied by Reading, Queen's Park Rangers, Sunderland and West Ham United.
- 5 November 2004 – Jacques Santini resigns as manager of Tottenham Hotspur, citing personal reasons. Martin Jol is named caretaker manager.
- 6 November 2004 – Arsenal draw 1–1 at Crystal Palace, allowing Chelsea to bypass them into first place for the first time in the season, going two points clear; the latter winning 1–0 at home to Everton.
- 8 November 2004 – The "caretaker" is removed from Martin Jol's title, as he signs a contract to manage Spurs through the 2006–07 season.
- 9 November 2004 – Bryan Robson is named as the new manager of West Bromwich Albion.
- 13 November 2004 – AFC Wimbledon sets a United Kingdom record for consecutive unbeaten league games in senior football, at 76, with a 1–1 draw at Bromley in Ryman Division One.
- 17 November 2004 – The England national team loses to Spain 1–0 at the Santiago Bernabéu Stadium in Madrid. However, the match is marred by racist chants from the crowd aimed at black England players. Ashley Cole and Shaun Wright-Phillips were particular targets of abuse; every time either touched the ball, monkey noises came from the crowd.
- 24 November 2004 – Harry Redknapp quits as manager of Portsmouth following a row with chairman Milan Mandarić over the appointment of new Director of Football Velimir Zajec at the club. Zajec then replaces Redknapp as manager with immediate effect.
- 24 November 2004 – Sir Alex Ferguson takes charge of his 1,000th match at Manchester United.
- 30 November 2004 – As November draws to a close, Chelsea have leapfrogged Arsenal at the top of the Premier League and are now five points ahead. Everton, Manchester United and Middlesbrough complete the top five, though they are now some way behind the top two in terms of points. West Bromwich Albion, Norwich City and Southampton occupy the bottom three places, while Tottenham Hotspur's promising start to the season has tailed off and they now stand just three places and one point above the drop zone. Ipswich Town are now top of the Championship, with Wigan Athletic second. Sunderland's good form has lifted them to third place, while the playoff zone is completed by Reading, West Ham United and Queen's Park Rangers.
- 3 December 2004 – League One side Wrexham enters financial administration. Under new Football League rules, the club is penalised 10 league points, placing the club in relegation danger.
- 4 December 2004 – AFC Wimbledon lose 2–0 to Cray Wanderers, ending their United Kingdom record run of consecutive unbeaten league games in senior football at 78, having last lost a league game in February 2003 when they were playing in the Combined Counties League.
- 8 December 2004 – Southampton sack Steve Wigley after only 14 games in charge. The Saints announce Harry Redknapp, who resigned as manager of their local rivals Portsmouth only two weeks ago, as their new manager.
- 31 December 2004 – Chelsea finish 2004 as Premier League leaders by an eight-point margin over second-placed Arsenal, who have a game in hand. Manchester United and Everton's recent run of good results keeps them similarly competitive as they are the next nearest threat, level on points and nine points off the top. Middlesbrough complete the top five, with strong competition from Liverpool, Charlton Athletic and a resurgent Tottenham Hotspur. West Bromwich Albion, with just one win so far this season, prop up the top flight with a mere 11 points. Southampton and Norwich City, both with just two wins so far this season, complete the bottom three, but are cranking up the pressure on Crystal Palace, Fulham and Blackburn Rovers. Ipswich Town and Sunderland lead the way in the Championship, with Wigan Athletic, Reading, Sheffield United and Millwall completing the top six.
- 5 January 2005 – Everton pay a club record £6 million for Southampton striker James Beattie.
- 11 January 2005 – Everton and Liverpool announce that they have abandoned plans to groundshare at Liverpool's new stadium, which is scheduled for completion in 2007. Norwich City boost their survival hopes with a club record £3 million signing of Crewe Alexandra striker Dean Ashton.
- 19 January 2005 – Blackburn Rovers sign Birmingham City's Robbie Savage for £3 million.
- 21 January 2005 – former Chelsea chairman Ken Bates finalises a deal to buy a controlling interest in the debt-riddled Championship club Leeds United.
- 31 January 2005 – January draws to a close with Chelsea still top of the Premier League by an 11-point margin and their closest threat now coming from Manchester United. Arsenal, Everton and Liverpool complete the top five, while Middlesbrough and Charlton Athletic are level on points with Liverpool in the race for a top-five place, though seventh place could be enough for a UEFA Cup place this season. Ipswich Town, Wigan Athletic and Sunderland continue to lead the way at the top of the Championship. Reading, Sheffield United and Preston North End complete the top six.
- 6 February 2005 – Chelsea, the Premier League leaders, face a Premier League inquiry over an alleged illegal approach for Arsenal defender Ashley Cole. If found guilty, Chelsea face a hefty fine and possibly even a points deduction.
- 7 February 2005 – Manchester United confirms that United States businessman Malcolm Glazer has made an £800 million bid to take over the club.
- 27 February 2005 – Chelsea win the League Cup beating Liverpool 3–2 after extra time, meaning that the sixth placed club will get a UEFA Cup place this season if Liverpool achieve a top five finish that Chelsea are on the verge of sealing any time now. In the Premier League, Chelsea now lead six points ahead of Manchester United and have a game in hand. Arsenal, Everton, Liverpool and Middlesbrough complete the top six. West Bromwich Albion continue to prop up the table, with Norwich City and Southampton completing the bottom three. Wigan Athletic, Sunderland and Ipswich Town are level on 66 points at the top of the Championship. Derby County, West Ham United and Preston North End complete the top six.
- 1 March 2005 – Arsenal midfielder Jermaine Pennant, currently on loan to Birmingham City, is found guilty of drink-driving, driving while disqualified, and driving without insurance. He is sentenced to three months in prison; he would be released on 31 March.
- 10 March 2005 – Kevin Keegan resigns as manager of Manchester City. Stuart Pearce takes over as caretaker manager.
- 31 March 2005 – March draws to a close with Chelsea now looking all set for title glory with an 11-point lead of Manchester United with eight games left to play. Arsenal, Everton, Bolton Wanderers and Liverpool complete the top six. Norwich City are now bottom of the table, while West Bromwich Albion and Southampton complete the bottom three. Sunderland are now top of the Championship, with Wigan Athletic second and Ipswich Town third. Preston North End, Derby County and Sheffield United complete the top six.
- 1 April 2005 – Newcastle United legend Alan Shearer announces that he will play in the 2005–06 season, reversing his prior plans to retire following this season.
- 2 April 2005 – Stockport County become the first League team this season to be relegated.
- 2 April 2005 – In a Premiership match between Newcastle United and Aston Villa at St James' Park, Newcastle teammates Lee Bowyer and Kieron Dyer are sent off for fighting each other.
- 7 April 2005 – Portsmouth appoint Frenchman Alain Perrin as manager, with Velimir Zajec reverting to his previous role as Director of Football.
- 10 April 2005 – James Vaughan of Everton becomes the youngest Premiership scorer as of this date when he scored in a match against Crystal Palace at the age of 16 years and 271 days.
- 15 April 2005 – Malcolm Glazer makes a revised bid to take over Manchester United. This bid reportedly is less dependent on debt than his February 2005 takeover bid, which was rejected by the club's board because of this issue. United's board has decided not to recommend the bid, but will allow shareholders to vote on whether to accept it, as they consider Glazer's price to be fair. The Takeover Panel subsequently gave Glazer a 17 May deadline to make an offer for the club.
- 30 April 2005 – Chelsea win the Premiership, their first top-flight title in 50 years, with a 2–0 victory over Bolton at the Reebok Stadium. Frank Lampard scored both goals. The race for second place is now being contested between Arsenal and Manchester United, with Arsenal having the advantage of one point and a game in hand. Everton, Liverpool, Bolton Wanderers and Tottenham Hotspur complete the top seven, as the FA Cup will (like the League Cup final was) be a top-five affair this season seventh place in the league will be enough for a UEFA Cup place this time. Middlesbrough, Manchester City and Aston Villa are still in contention for a UEFA Cup place on these grounds. Norwich City, West Bromwich Albion and Crystal Palace occupy the bottom three places, with Southampton out of the bottom three only due to having a slightly better goal difference than Crystal Palace. Sunderland will be back in the Premier League next season after a two-year exile, being in pole position at the top of the Championship. Wigan Athletic and Ipswich Town are in the race for second place. Preston North End, Derby County and Reading complete the top six, but West Ham United and Sheffield United are still in contention for the playoff places. Away from the Championship promotion race, Coventry City assure their Championship survival in style with a 6–2 win over Derby County in the last ever game at Highfield Road, which they are leaving after 106 years to relocate to the 32,500-seat Ricoh Arena. A crowd of 22,728 watched the game.
- 8 May 2005 – Wigan Athletic finish second in the Championship and are promoted to the Premier League – giving them top-flight football for the first time in their history. They were only elected to the Football League 27 years previously and reached the second tier of the English league just two years before.
- 11 May 2005 –
  - – Stuart Pearce is appointed manager of Manchester City on a full-time basis, having previously been caretaker.
    - – Swansea City beat Wrexham 2–1 in the FAW Premier Cup final in their last game at the 93-year-old Vetch Field before relocation to their new 22,000-seat stadium. They also have the joy of promotion from League Two to go out on a high at their old stadium.
- 12 May 2005 – Malcolm Glazer gained control of Manchester United after buying the 28.9% share owned by Irish businessmen and horse racing magnates J. P. McManus and John Magnier. With this purchase, Glazer officially launched his bid for a complete takeover.
- 15 May 2005 – Crystal Palace, Norwich City and Southampton are relegated from the Premiership on the last day of the season, finishing 18th, 19th and 20th respectively. West Bromwich Albion, which started the day at the bottom of the table, complete an improbable escape to become the first club since the creation of the Premier League in 1992–93 to survive after being the bottom team at Christmas. Their survival was achieved with a 2–0 home win over Portsmouth, while Crystal Palace had been less than ten minutes from safety when Charlton Athletic equalised against them. Norwich City could have saved themselves regardless of what happened to the other three teams had they won at Fulham, but instead were hammered 6–0 in the showdown at Craven Cottage. Southampton's survival bid ended with a 2–1 home defeat by Manchester United, drawing the curtain on 27 successive seasons of top-flight football at the club.
- 15 May 2005 – Also on the last day of the Premiership, Middlesbrough goalkeeper Mark Schwarzer saves a Robbie Fowler penalty in stoppage time to preserve a 1–1 draw at Manchester City, allowing Boro to finish seventh and grab the final UEFA Cup berth. If Fowler had converted, Man City would have gone to the UEFA Cup instead of the Teessiders.
- 16 May 2005 – Malcolm Glazer announces that he has acquired 75% of the shares of Manchester United. This level of ownership will enable him to delist the club from the London Stock Exchange, which he has pledged to do.
- 21 May 2005 – Arsenal beat Manchester Utd on penalties in the FA Cup Final after no goals were scored in normal or extra time, this being the first final to be decided on penalties. Patrick Vieira converted the winning spot-kick in what was his last game for the Gunners.
- 25 May 2005 – Liverpool win the European Cup for a fifth time, beating Milan 3–2 on penalties after extra time. Milan went ahead 3–0 in the first half, but Liverpool scored three goals in the first 15 minutes of the second half to level the score.
- 30 May 2005 – West Ham United achieve promotion back to the Premier League after 2 years away with a 1–0 victory over Preston North End in the Championship play-off final.
- 1 June 2005 – An independent commission charged by the Premier League with investigating the alleged "tapping up" of Arsenal defender Ashley Cole by Chelsea issues its findings:
  - Cole is found guilty of violating Premier League Rule K5, which prohibits players from approaching clubs with intent of negotiating a transfer without the permission of their current clubs. He is fined £100,000.
  - Chelsea are found guilty of violating Rule K3, which prohibits a club from contacting a player under contract without the permission of his current club. Chelsea are fined £300,000, and receive a suspended three-point deduction for the 2005–06 season. The deduction will be assessed if Chelsea are guilty of another tapping-up offence in 2005–06.
  - Chelsea manager José Mourinho is found guilty of violating Rule Q, which governs managers' conduct, and is fined £200,000.
- 3 June 2005 – Northwich Victoria's ground is confirmed to be up to Conference National standards. However, due to legal issues stemming from their spell in administration earlier in the season, their points total is zeroed and they are relegated from the Conference as a result. Previously relegated Forest Green replace them.
- 4 June 2005 – Spurs suspend their sporting director Frank Arnesen, and accuse Chelsea of making an illegal approach to him. Chelsea deny the accusations, claiming that they had made an official approach to the club regarding Arnesen.
- 7 June 2005 – George Burley resigns as manager of Derby County, citing differences with the club's board.
- 10 June 2005 – UEFA changes the rules for the UEFA Champions League to ensure that the reigning champions will always be able to defend their title. The immediate effect is to allow Liverpool to defend their crown, despite a fifth-place finish in the Premiership, outside the four slots currently allotted for England in the competition. Liverpool will have to begin play in the first of three qualifying rounds. Mikael Forssell joins Birmingham City from Chelsea for £3 million after two seasons on loan.
- 15 June 2005 – Newcastle United sign Chelsea midfielder Scott Parker for £6.5 million.
- 22 June 2005 – Southampton manager Harry Redknapp confirms reports that the Saints will bring on Sir Clive Woodward, former England rugby union head coach and current head coach of the British & Irish Lions, as director of football. Woodward will join Saints after the Lions tour.
- 24 June 2005 – Spurs and Chelsea jointly announce that they have reached an agreement in principle regarding Spurs sporting director Frank Arnesen, who had been suspended after Chelsea had allegedly made an illegal approach to him. The next day, a Chelsea official revealed that the club paid £5 million.
- 24 June 2005 – The Welsh champions Total Network Solutions, who had previously offered to play a two-legged playoff with Champions League holders Liverpool for TNS's place in the first qualifying round of the competition, wind up being drawn against Liverpool in the first qualifying round of the competition.
- 24 June 2005 – former Bolton Wanderers assistant manager Phil Brown becomes Derby County's fifth manager in four years.
- 16 July 2005 – F.C. United of Manchester, a club formed by a group of Manchester United supporters in response to the Glazer takeover of Manchester United, play their first-ever match, a preseason friendly with Leigh RMI. The match ends in a 0–0 draw.

== National team ==
England began their qualifying campaign for the 2006 FIFA World Cup. They played alongside UK neighbours Wales and Northern Ireland in the European Group 6.

| Date | Venue | Opponents | Score^{*} | Competition | England scorers | Match Report |
|---|---|---|---|---|---|---|
| 18 August 2004 | St James' Park, Newcastle upon Tyne (H) | Ukraine | 3–0 | F | David Beckham, Michael Owen, Shaun Wright-Phillips | |
| 4 September 2004 | Ernst-Happel-Stadion, Vienna (A) | Austria | 2–2 | WCQ | Frank Lampard, Steven Gerrard | |
| 8 September 2004 | Silesian Stadium, Chorzów / Katowice (A) | Poland | 2–1 | WCQ | Jermain Defoe, Arkadiusz Głowacki (o.g.) | |
| 9 October 2004 | Old Trafford, Manchester (H) | Wales | 2–0 | WCQ | Frank Lampard, David Beckham | |
| 13 October 2004 | Tofiq Bahramov Republican Stadium, Baku (A) | Azerbaijan | 1–0 | WCQ | Michael Owen | |
| 17 November 2004 | Bernabeu, Madrid (A) | Spain | 0–1 | F | | |
| 9 February 2005 | Villa Park, Birmingham (H) | Netherlands | 0–0 | F | | |
| 26 March 2005 | Old Trafford, Manchester (H) | Northern Ireland | 4–0 | WCQ | Joe Cole, Michael Owen, Chris Baird (o.g.), Frank Lampard | |
| 30 March 2005 | St James' Park, Newcastle upon Tyne (H) | Azerbaijan | 2–0 | WCQ | Steven Gerrard, David Beckham | |
| 28 May 2005 | Soldier Field, Chicago (A) | United States | 2–1 | F | Kieran Richardson (2) | |
| 31 May 2005 | Giants Stadium, East Rutherford (N) | Colombia | 3–2 | F | Michael Owen (3) | |

* England score given first

Key

- H = Home match
- A = Away match
- N = Neutral site
- F = Friendly
- WCQ = FIFA World Cup 2006 Qualifying, European Zone Group 6
- o.g. = Own goal

== Final standings ==
=== FA Premier League ===
Chelsea, in their first season under new manager José Mourinho, broke records as they won their first League title for 50 years, losing just one Premiership game all season and setting a top-flight record of 29 wins and 95 points, in addition to winning the League Cup. Arsenal (unbeaten league champions a year earlier) extended their unbeaten run to 49 games before a controversial loss at Manchester United ended this remarkable achievement. Despite this, The Gunners were Chelsea's closest challengers and finished in second place, 12 points behind. United kept the two London teams under pressure with their own impressive league form since ending Arsenal's run, but slipped up and ultimately took third place. Everton, who had only just avoided relegation a year earlier, surprised all the observers by clinching the fourth Champions League place (even more remarkable considering they lost striker Wayne Rooney to Manchester United at the end of August). Liverpool, in their first season under Rafa Benítez, suffered from indifferent domestic form and finished in fifth place, finishing much closer to the relegation zone in terms of points than the top.

Despite this, however, Benítez showed off his impressive managerial skills with an unforeseen and staggering Champions League run that took them to the final in Istanbul against highly regarded and highly tipped Italian club Milan, forcing the game into extra time and penalties. Liverpool kept the advantage in the shootout, winning 3–2 and ending a 21-year wait to win Europe's elite competition. This stunning achievement, considering Liverpool's poor domestic form that season, was enough for UEFA to allow Liverpool to become the fifth English team in next year's competition to take part, a first for European football.

Bolton Wanderers finished sixth – their highest league finish in decades and just a lower goal difference keeping them behind Liverpool – to qualify for the UEFA Cup, having never played in Europe before. Middlesbrough joined them, finishing seventh.

All three relegation places were decided on the final day of the season, for the first time in Premier League history. Crystal Palace, Norwich City and Southampton (after 27 years) went down, but West Bromwich Albion managed to stay up despite being bottom before the games started and also having the worst record of any Premiership team to avoid relegation (six wins and 34 points). They were also the first-ever Premiership team to avoid relegation after being bottom on Christmas Day, and the first top-flight team to achieve this feat since Sheffield United in 1991.

| Pos | Team | Pld | W | D | L | GF | GA | GD | Pts | Qualification or relegation |
|---|---|---|---|---|---|---|---|---|---|---|
| 1 | Chelsea (C) | 38 | 29 | 8 | 1 | 72 | 15 | +57 | 95 | Qualification for the Champions League group stage |
| 2 | Arsenal | 38 | 25 | 8 | 5 | 87 | 36 | +51 | 83 | Qualification for the Champions League group stage |
| 3 | Manchester United | 38 | 22 | 11 | 5 | 58 | 26 | +32 | 77 | Qualification for the Champions League third qualifying round |
| 4 | Everton | 38 | 18 | 7 | 13 | 45 | 46 | −1 | 61 | Qualification for the Champions League third qualifying round |
| 5 | Liverpool | 38 | 17 | 7 | 14 | 52 | 41 | +11 | 58 | Qualification for the Champions League first qualifying round (Note: Although they failed to qualify for the Champions League as one of the top four English clubs, Liverpool were given a special dispensation to compete as the defending champions. They were, however, forced to enter in the first qualifying round.) |
| 6 | Bolton Wanderers | 38 | 16 | 10 | 12 | 49 | 44 | +5 | 58 | Qualification for the UEFA Cup first round (Note: Since the finalists of the FA Cup, Arsenal and Manchester United, as well as Chelsea, who won the 2004–05 Football League Cup, were qualified for the Champions League, and the fifth-placed team (Liverpool) were moved to the Champions League, the sixth and seventh-placed teams in the Premier League were rewarded entry to the UEFA Cup.) |
| 7 | Middlesbrough | 38 | 14 | 13 | 11 | 53 | 46 | +7 | 55 | Qualification for the UEFA Cup first round |
| 8 | Manchester City | 38 | 13 | 13 | 12 | 47 | 39 | +8 | 52 | |
| 9 | Tottenham Hotspur | 38 | 14 | 10 | 14 | 47 | 41 | +6 | 52 | |
| 10 | Aston Villa | 38 | 12 | 11 | 15 | 45 | 52 | −7 | 47 | |
| 11 | Charlton Athletic | 38 | 12 | 10 | 16 | 42 | 58 | −16 | 46 | |
| 12 | Birmingham City | 38 | 11 | 12 | 15 | 40 | 46 | −6 | 45 | |
| 13 | Fulham | 38 | 12 | 8 | 18 | 52 | 60 | −8 | 44 | |
| 14 | Newcastle United | 38 | 10 | 14 | 14 | 47 | 57 | −10 | 44 | Qualification for the Intertoto Cup third round |
| 15 | Blackburn Rovers | 38 | 9 | 15 | 14 | 32 | 43 | −11 | 42 | |
| 16 | Portsmouth | 38 | 10 | 9 | 19 | 43 | 59 | −16 | 39 | |
| 17 | West Bromwich Albion | 38 | 6 | 16 | 16 | 36 | 61 | −25 | 34 | |
| 18 | Crystal Palace (R) | 38 | 7 | 12 | 19 | 41 | 62 | −21 | 33 | Relegation to the Football League Championship |
| 19 | Norwich City (R) | 38 | 7 | 12 | 19 | 42 | 77 | −35 | 33 | Relegation to the Football League Championship |
| 20 | Southampton (R) | 38 | 6 | 14 | 18 | 45 | 66 | −21 | 32 | Relegation to the Football League Championship |

Rules for classification: 1) points; 2) goal difference; 3) number of goals scored.
(C) Champions; (R) Relegated
Notes:

Leading goalscorer: Thierry Henry (Arsenal)- 25

=== The Football League ===
==== Football League Championship ====
After narrowly missing out on promotion the previous season, Sunderland clinched a return to the top-flight as champions. Wigan Athletic joined them as runners-up, entering the top-tier for the first time in their history and giving manager Paul Jewell his second promotion to the Premier League in six years. West Ham United made amends for their loss in the play-off final the previous year by beating Preston North End.

Unusually, none of the sides relegated to the Championship in 2003–04 did particularly well. While Leeds United were widely predicted for a second successive relegation and possible bankruptcy (both of which looked likely in the middle of the season, but were staved off by another takeover), Wolverhampton Wanderers and Leicester City were predicted to challenge for promotion. Instead, both sides started badly, and replaced their managers mid-season, never really looking like promotion contenders.

At the bottom of the table, Rotherham United and Gillingham's luck finally ran out, and both were relegated after a short few years in which both clubs battled the odds on small budgets. What made bigger headlines was Nottingham Forest's relegation to League One, six years after they were in the Premiership, and which made them the first European Cup winners to drop to the third division of their domestic league. Dario Gradi's Crewe Alexandra managed to survive relegation on the last day of the season in their 2–1 win over Coventry City, which was their first win without striker Dean Ashton, who was sold to Norwich City for £3 million.

| Pos | Team | Pld | W | D | L | GF | GA | GD | Pts | Promotion, qualification or relegation |
|---|---|---|---|---|---|---|---|---|---|---|
| 1 | Sunderland (C, P) | 46 | 29 | 7 | 10 | 76 | 41 | +35 | 94 | Promotion to the FA Premier League |
| 2 | Wigan Athletic (P) | 46 | 25 | 12 | 9 | 79 | 35 | +44 | 87 | Promotion to the FA Premier League |
| 3 | Ipswich Town | 46 | 24 | 13 | 9 | 85 | 56 | +29 | 85 | Qualification for Championship play-offs |
| 4 | Derby County | 46 | 22 | 10 | 14 | 71 | 60 | +11 | 76 | Qualification for Championship play-offs |
| 5 | Preston North End | 46 | 21 | 12 | 13 | 67 | 58 | +9 | 75 | Qualification for Championship play-offs |
| 6 | West Ham United (O, P) | 46 | 21 | 10 | 15 | 66 | 56 | +10 | 73 | Qualification for Championship play-offs |
| 7 | Reading | 46 | 19 | 13 | 14 | 51 | 44 | +7 | 70 | |
| 8 | Sheffield United | 46 | 18 | 13 | 15 | 57 | 56 | +1 | 67 | |
| 9 | Wolverhampton Wanderers | 46 | 15 | 21 | 10 | 72 | 59 | +13 | 66 | |
| 10 | Millwall | 46 | 18 | 12 | 16 | 51 | 45 | +6 | 66 | |
| 11 | Queens Park Rangers | 46 | 17 | 11 | 18 | 54 | 58 | −4 | 62 | |
| 12 | Stoke City | 46 | 17 | 10 | 19 | 36 | 38 | −2 | 61 | |
| 13 | Burnley | 46 | 15 | 15 | 16 | 38 | 39 | −1 | 60 | |
| 14 | Leeds United | 46 | 14 | 18 | 14 | 49 | 52 | −3 | 60 | |
| 15 | Leicester City | 46 | 12 | 21 | 13 | 49 | 46 | +3 | 57 | |
| 16 | Cardiff City | 46 | 13 | 15 | 18 | 48 | 51 | −3 | 54 | |
| 17 | Plymouth Argyle | 46 | 14 | 11 | 21 | 52 | 64 | −12 | 53 | |
| 18 | Watford | 46 | 12 | 16 | 18 | 52 | 59 | −7 | 52 | |
| 19 | Coventry City | 46 | 13 | 13 | 20 | 61 | 73 | −12 | 52 | |
| 20 | Brighton & Hove Albion | 46 | 13 | 12 | 21 | 40 | 65 | −25 | 51 | |
| 21 | Crewe Alexandra | 46 | 12 | 14 | 20 | 66 | 86 | −20 | 50 | |
| 22 | Gillingham (R) | 46 | 12 | 14 | 20 | 45 | 66 | −21 | 50 | Relegation to Football League One |
| 23 | Nottingham Forest (R) | 46 | 9 | 17 | 20 | 42 | 66 | −24 | 44 | Relegation to Football League One |
| 24 | Rotherham United (R) | 46 | 5 | 14 | 27 | 35 | 69 | −34 | 29 | Relegation to Football League One |

Updated to match(es) played on 9 December 2011. Source: Football League Tables
Rules for classification: 1) points; 2) goal difference; 3) number of goals scored.
(C) Champions; (O) Play-off winners; (P) Promoted; (R) Relegated

Leading goalscorer: Nathan Ellington (Wigan Athletic) – 24

==== Football League One ====
Luton Town performed the best out of any League side to clinch promotion. Hull City joined them, their second promotion in as many seasons. Sheffield Wednesday – who looked like spending another season fighting relegation in the first few months – returned to the Championship under new manager Paul Sturrock, who put his sacking at Southampton behind him to lead Wednesday to their best season in nearly a decade.

Going down to League Two were Stockport, who continued their decline which began with relegation from Division One in 2001–02, Peterborough United, feeling the strain of their financial situation, soon followed. Torquay United, whose first season out of the bottom division in 12 years, ended in disappointment and they were also relegated. The fourth relegated side would have been Milton Keynes Dons (formerly Wimbledon), but Wrexham went into administration and lost ten points as a result (despite the club's argument that it would be harder for them to exit administration if they were relegated).

| Pos | Team | Pld | W | D | L | GF | GA | GD | Pts | Promotion or relegation |
|---|---|---|---|---|---|---|---|---|---|---|
| 1 | Luton Town (C, P) | 46 | 29 | 11 | 6 | 87 | 48 | +39 | 98 | Promotion to Football League Championship |
| 2 | Hull City (P) | 46 | 26 | 8 | 12 | 80 | 53 | +27 | 86 | Promotion to Football League Championship |
| 3 | Tranmere Rovers | 46 | 22 | 13 | 11 | 73 | 55 | +18 | 79 | Qualification for League One play-offs |
| 4 | Brentford | 46 | 22 | 9 | 15 | 57 | 60 | −3 | 75 | Qualification for League One play-offs |
| 5 | Sheffield Wednesday (O, P) | 46 | 19 | 15 | 12 | 77 | 59 | +18 | 72 | Qualification for League One play-offs |
| 6 | Hartlepool United | 46 | 21 | 8 | 17 | 76 | 66 | +10 | 71 | Qualification for League One play-offs |
| 7 | Bristol City | 46 | 18 | 16 | 12 | 74 | 57 | +17 | 70 | |
| 8 | Bournemouth | 46 | 20 | 10 | 16 | 77 | 64 | +13 | 70 | |
| 9 | Huddersfield Town | 46 | 20 | 10 | 16 | 74 | 65 | +9 | 70 | |
| 10 | Doncaster Rovers | 46 | 16 | 18 | 12 | 65 | 60 | +5 | 66 | |
| 11 | Bradford City | 46 | 17 | 14 | 15 | 64 | 62 | +2 | 65 | |
| 12 | Swindon Town | 46 | 17 | 12 | 17 | 66 | 68 | −2 | 63 | |
| 13 | Barnsley | 46 | 14 | 19 | 13 | 69 | 64 | +5 | 61 | |
| 14 | Walsall | 46 | 16 | 12 | 18 | 65 | 69 | −4 | 60 | |
| 15 | Colchester United | 46 | 14 | 17 | 15 | 60 | 50 | +10 | 59 | |
| 16 | Blackpool | 46 | 15 | 12 | 19 | 54 | 59 | −5 | 57 | |
| 17 | Chesterfield | 46 | 14 | 15 | 17 | 55 | 62 | −7 | 57 | |
| 18 | Port Vale | 46 | 17 | 5 | 24 | 49 | 59 | −10 | 56 | |
| 19 | Oldham Athletic | 46 | 14 | 10 | 22 | 60 | 73 | −13 | 52 | |
| 20 | Milton Keynes Dons | 46 | 12 | 15 | 19 | 54 | 68 | −14 | 51 | |
| 21 | Torquay United (R) | 46 | 12 | 15 | 19 | 55 | 79 | −24 | 51 | Relegation to Football League Two |
| 22 | Wrexham (R) | 46 | 13 | 14 | 19 | 62 | 80 | −18 | 43 (Note: Wrexham deducted 10 points for entering administration.) | Relegation to Football League Two |
| 23 | Peterborough United (R) | 46 | 9 | 12 | 25 | 49 | 73 | −24 | 39 | Relegation to Football League Two |
| 24 | Stockport County (R) | 46 | 6 | 8 | 32 | 49 | 98 | −49 | 26 | Relegation to Football League Two |

Updated to match(es) played on May 2005. Source: Soccerbase
Rules for classification: 1) points; 2) goal difference; 3) number of goals scored.
(C) Champions; (O) Play-off winners; (P) Promoted; (R) Relegated
Notes:

Leading goalscorer: Stuart Elliott (Hull City) – 27, and Dean Windass (Bradford City) – 27

==== Football League Two ====
Just two years after winning the Conference, Yeovil Town followed in Doncaster Rovers' footsteps by winning the League Two title. Scunthorpe United – relegation candidates the season before – joined them, while Swansea City edged the last automatic promotion spot. The side that they edged out, Southend United, made amends by winning the play-offs, beating Lincoln City in the final.

At the bottom, Cambridge United and Kidderminster Harriers' finances hit them hard, and they fell out of the league, both on the back of signing several foreign players who proved ineffective. While Cambridge went into administration, this happened after they were already relegated, and made no difference overall, short of lifting Kidderminster above them.

| Pos | Team | Pld | W | D | L | GF | GA | GD | Pts | Promotion or relegation |
|---|---|---|---|---|---|---|---|---|---|---|
| 1 | Yeovil Town (C, P) | 46 | 25 | 8 | 13 | 90 | 65 | +25 | 83 | Promotion to League One |
| 2 | Scunthorpe United (P) | 46 | 22 | 14 | 10 | 69 | 42 | +27 | 80 | Promotion to League One |
| 3 | Swansea City (P) | 46 | 24 | 8 | 14 | 62 | 43 | +19 | 80 | Promotion to League One |
| 4 | Southend United (O, P) | 46 | 22 | 12 | 12 | 65 | 46 | +19 | 78 | Qualification for League Two play-offs |
| 5 | Macclesfield Town | 46 | 22 | 9 | 15 | 60 | 49 | +11 | 75 | Qualification for League Two play-offs |
| 6 | Lincoln City | 46 | 20 | 12 | 14 | 64 | 47 | +17 | 72 | Qualification for League Two play-offs |
| 7 | Northampton Town | 46 | 20 | 12 | 14 | 62 | 51 | +11 | 72 | Qualification for League Two play-offs |
| 8 | Darlington | 46 | 20 | 12 | 14 | 57 | 49 | +8 | 72 | |
| 9 | Rochdale | 46 | 16 | 18 | 12 | 54 | 48 | +6 | 66 | |
| 10 | Wycombe Wanderers | 46 | 17 | 14 | 15 | 58 | 52 | +6 | 65 | |
| 11 | Leyton Orient | 46 | 16 | 15 | 15 | 65 | 67 | −2 | 63 | |
| 12 | Bristol Rovers | 46 | 13 | 21 | 12 | 60 | 57 | +3 | 60 | |
| 13 | Mansfield Town | 46 | 15 | 15 | 16 | 56 | 56 | 0 | 60 | |
| 14 | Cheltenham Town | 46 | 16 | 12 | 18 | 51 | 54 | −3 | 60 | |
| 15 | Oxford United | 46 | 16 | 11 | 19 | 50 | 63 | −13 | 59 | |
| 16 | Boston United | 46 | 14 | 16 | 16 | 62 | 58 | +4 | 58 | |
| 17 | Bury | 46 | 14 | 16 | 16 | 54 | 54 | 0 | 58 | |
| 18 | Grimsby Town | 46 | 14 | 16 | 16 | 51 | 52 | −1 | 58 | |
| 19 | Notts County | 46 | 13 | 13 | 20 | 46 | 62 | −16 | 52 | |
| 20 | Chester City | 46 | 12 | 16 | 18 | 43 | 69 | −26 | 52 | |
| 21 | Shrewsbury Town | 46 | 11 | 16 | 19 | 48 | 53 | −5 | 49 | |
| 22 | Rushden & Diamonds | 46 | 10 | 14 | 22 | 42 | 63 | −21 | 44 | |
| 23 | Kidderminster Harriers (R) | 46 | 10 | 8 | 28 | 39 | 85 | −46 | 38 | Relegation to Conference National |
| 24 | Cambridge United (R) | 46 | 8 | 16 | 22 | 39 | 62 | −23 | 30 (Note: Cambridge United deducted 10 points for entering administration) | Relegation to Conference National |

Updated to match(es) played on 15 September 2009. Source: 2004–05 League Two
Rules for classification: 1) points; 2) goal difference; 3) number of goals scored.
(C) Champions; (O) Play-off winners; (P) Promoted; (R) Relegated
Notes:

Leading goalscorer: Phil Jevons (Yeovil Town) – 27

=== Non-League football ===
| Competition | Winners |
|---|---|
| Conference National winners | Barnet |
| Conference National playoff winners | Carlisle United |
| Conference North winners | Southport |
| Conference South winners | Grays Athletic |
| FA Trophy winners | Grays Athletic |
| FA Vase winners | Didcot Town |

== Famous debutants ==
- James Vaughan – 16-year-old striker, scores on his Everton debut (a 4–1 home win over Crystal Palace) to become the then youngest scorer in Premier League history.
- Cesc Fàbregas – 17-year-old Spanish midfielder, makes his Arsenal debut against Everton on 15 August 2004 (opening day of the Premier League season) in a 1–4 win at Goodison Park.

== Women's football ==
=== Women's Premier League ===
==== National Division ====
| Pos | Team | Pld | W | D | L | GF | GA | GD | Pts | Qualification or relegation |
|---|---|---|---|---|---|---|---|---|---|---|
| 1 | Arsenal (C) | 18 | 15 | 3 | 0 | 57 | 13 | +44 | 48 | Qualification for the UEFA Cup qualifying round |
| 2 | Charlton Athletic | 18 | 13 | 2 | 3 | 43 | 17 | +26 | 41 | |
| 3 | Everton | 18 | 11 | 4 | 3 | 45 | 24 | +21 | 37 | |
| 4 | Birmingham City | 18 | 9 | 3 | 6 | 37 | 28 | +9 | 30 | |
| 5 | Bristol Rovers | 18 | 9 | 1 | 8 | 35 | 28 | +7 | 28 | |
| 6 | Leeds United | 18 | 8 | 2 | 8 | 31 | 34 | −3 | 26 | |
| 7 | Fulham | 18 | 3 | 5 | 10 | 18 | 39 | −21 | 14 | |
| 8 | Doncaster Rovers Belles | 18 | 3 | 3 | 12 | 10 | 38 | −28 | 12 | |
| 9 | Liverpool (R) | 18 | 3 | 2 | 13 | 21 | 49 | −28 | 11 | Relegation to the Northern Division |
| 10 | Bristol City (R) | 18 | 2 | 3 | 13 | 12 | 39 | −27 | 9 | Relegation to the Southern Division |

Source: FA WPL
(C) Champions; (R) Relegated

==== Northern Division ====
| Pos | Team | Pld | W | D | L | GF | GA | GD | Pts | Promotion or relegation |
|---|---|---|---|---|---|---|---|---|---|---|
| 1 | Sunderland (C, P) | 22 | 17 | 2 | 3 | 66 | 26 | +40 | 53 | Promotion to the National Division |
| 2 | Wolverhampton Wanderers | 22 | 14 | 5 | 3 | 46 | 19 | +27 | 47 | |
| 3 | Blackburn Rovers | 22 | 10 | 9 | 3 | 59 | 39 | +20 | 39 | |
| 4 | Stockport County | 22 | 7 | 9 | 6 | 37 | 39 | −2 | 30 | |
| 5 | Lincoln | 22 | 8 | 5 | 9 | 43 | 48 | −5 | 29 | |
| 6 | Aston Villa | 22 | 8 | 4 | 10 | 36 | 43 | −7 | 28 | |
| 7 | Middlesbrough | 22 | 6 | 6 | 10 | 34 | 41 | −7 | 24 | |
| 8 | Tranmere Rovers | 22 | 7 | 3 | 12 | 31 | 38 | −7 | 24 | |
| 9 | Oldham Curzon | 22 | 6 | 6 | 10 | 34 | 42 | −8 | 24 | |
| 10 | Manchester City | 22 | 7 | 3 | 12 | 29 | 45 | −16 | 24 | |
| 11 | Sheffield Wednesday (R) | 22 | 5 | 8 | 9 | 26 | 40 | −14 | 23 | Relegation to the Northern Combination League |
| 12 | Coventry City (R) | 22 | 4 | 6 | 12 | 33 | 54 | −21 | 18 | Relegation to the Midland Combination League |

Source: FA WPL
(C) Champions; (P) Promoted; (R) Relegated

==== Southern Division ====
| Pos | Team | Pld | W | D | L | GF | GA | GD | Pts | Promotion or relegation |
|---|---|---|---|---|---|---|---|---|---|---|
| 1 | Chelsea (C, P) | 22 | 16 | 4 | 2 | 72 | 25 | +47 | 52 | Promotion to the National Division |
| 2 | Portsmouth | 22 | 13 | 5 | 4 | 42 | 26 | +16 | 44 | |
| 3 | Brighton & Hove Albion | 22 | 11 | 3 | 8 | 59 | 43 | +16 | 36 | |
| 4 | Crystal Palace | 22 | 10 | 6 | 6 | 36 | 25 | +11 | 36 | |
| 5 | AFC Wimbledon | 22 | 11 | 2 | 9 | 51 | 32 | +19 | 35 | |
| 6 | Millwall Lionesses | 22 | 9 | 8 | 5 | 37 | 33 | +4 | 35 | |
| 7 | Cardiff City | 22 | 9 | 7 | 6 | 41 | 30 | +11 | 34 | Qualification for the UEFA Cup qualifying round |
| 8 | Southampton Saints | 22 | 7 | 6 | 9 | 39 | 40 | −1 | 27 | |
| 9 | Watford | 22 | 7 | 6 | 9 | 38 | 40 | −2 | 27 | |
| 10 | Langford | 22 | 6 | 5 | 11 | 28 | 52 | −24 | 23 | |
| 11 | Enfield Town (R) | 22 | 1 | 6 | 15 | 20 | 61 | −41 | 9 | Relegation to the South East Combination League |
| 12 | Ipswich Town (R) | 22 | 2 | 2 | 18 | 28 | 84 | −56 | 8 | Relegation to the South East Combination League |

Source: FA WPL
(C) Champions; (P) Promoted; (R) Relegated

=== FA Women's Cup ===
==== Final ====
2 May 2005
13:00 BST

| Charlton Athletic | 1–0 | Everton |
|---|---|---|
| Aluko 58' | (Report) |

Boleyn Ground, London
Attendance: 8,567
Referee: Mike Jones (Cheshire)

== Transfer deals ==
=== Summer transfer window ===
The summer transfer window runs from the end of the previous season until 31 August.

=== January transfer window ===
The mid-season transfer window runs from 1 to 31 January 2005.

For subsequent transfer deals see 2005–06 in English football.

=== Retirements ===
- Fernando Hierro (Bolton Wanderers)
- Mark Fish (Charlton Athletic)
- Lucas Radebe (Leeds United)
- Martin Grainger (Birmingham City)
- Emmanuel Petit (Chelsea)
- Mario Stanić (Chelsea)
- Dean Richards (Tottenham Hotspur)
- Graeme Le Saux (Southampton)
- Jamie Redknapp (Southampton)

== Deaths ==
- 20 August 2004: Arthur Lever, 84, former Cardiff City, Leicester City and Newport County player who made over 300 appearances in the Football League in a career spanning eleven years from 1946 to 1957, winning one cap for Wales in 1952.
- 20 September 2004: Brian Clough, 69, who achieved league title success as manager with Derby County in 1972 but is best remembered for his achievement at Nottingham Forest – where he won promotion to the original First Division and established Forest as one of Europe's top sides. They were league champions once, European Cup winners twice and League Cup winners four times. He underwent a liver transplant in January 2003, 20 months before his death from stomach cancer in a Derby hospital.
- 23 October 2004: Bill Nicholson, 85, who won a host of domestic and European trophies with Tottenham during the 1960s and 1970s, including the double in 1961 – which made Tottenham the first English club to win the double during the 20th century.
- 9 November 2004: Emlyn Hughes, 57, former Liverpool player and England captain who won numerous domestic and European trophies with Liverpool as well as a League Cup with Wolves. During the 1980s he was a successful team captain on BBC's A Question of Sport.
- 13 November 2004: Keith Weller, 58, former Leicester player and England international who won the UEFA Cup Winners' Cup with Chelsea in 1971.
- 17 November 2004: Frank Neary, 83, scored 118 league goals as a forward for QPR, West Ham United, Orient and Millwall in the immediate postwar years.
- 1 December 2004: Bill Brown, 73, was goalkeeper for Spurs when they won the double in 1961.
- 12 December 2004: Harry McNally, 68, was a charismatic former manager of Wigan Athletic and Chester City. His popularity at Chester was such that the home terrace at the Deva Stadium would later be named after him.
- 15 March 2005: Bill McGarry, 77, who died in South Africa after a long illness, played some 600 senior games for Port Vale, Huddersfield Town and Bournemouth & Boscombe Athletic in the first 17 postwar seasons, beginning his managerial career at Bournemouth in 1961. He managed Ipswich Town to promotion to the top flight in 1968 and Wolverhampton Wanderers to League Cup glory in 1974. He managed Newcastle United from 1977 to 1980 and then had a brief, unsuccessful return to Wolves in 1985 during their three-season slump from the First Division to the Fourth.
- 21 May 2005: Bedford Jezzard, 77, was a centre forward for Fulham and England during the 1950s.
- 19 June 2005: Dave Carr, 48, was a defender with Luton Town, Lincoln City and Torquay United between 1973 and 1984.
