= Listed buildings in Nonington =

Historic structures in Kent, England

Nonington is a village and civil parish in the Dover District of Kent, England. It contains 55 listed buildings that are recorded in the National Heritage List for England. Of these two are grade I, two are grade II* and 51 are grade II.

This list is based on the information retrieved online from Historic England.

== Key ==
| Grade | Criteria |
|---|---|
| I | Buildings that are of exceptional interest |
| II* | Particularly important buildings of more than special interest |
| II | Buildings that are of special interest |

== Listing ==
| Name | Grade | Location | Type | Completed (Note: The date given is the date used by Historic England as significant for the initial building or that of an important part in the structure's description.) | Date designated | Grid ref. (Note: The grid reference is based on the British national grid reference system, sometimes known as OSGB36, used by the Ordnance Survey.) Geo-coordinates | Notes | Entry number (Note: The "List Entry Number" is a unique number assigned to each listed building and scheduled monument by Historic England.) | Image | Wikidata |
|---|---|---|---|---|---|---|---|---|---|---|
| Wall Parallel and to the North-west of the Coach House at Old St Albans Court | II | | | | 15 February 2012 | TR2634152490; 51°13′36″N 1°14′25″E | | 1404426 | Upload Photo | Q26675680 |
| Beauchamps | II | Beauchamps Lane | | | 3 December 1986 | TR2584152378; 51°13′33″N 1°13′59″E | | 1070266 | Upload Photo | Q26323979 |
| Butter Street Cottage | II | Butter Street | | | 11 October 1963 | TR2488851891; 51°13′19″N 1°13′09″E | | 1349052 | Upload Photo | Q26632375 |
| Goosebery Hall Cottage | II | Cherrygarden Lane | | | 3 December 1986 | TR2698152866; 51°13′47″N 1°14′59″E | | 1070267 | Upload Photo | Q26323981 |
| Goosebery Hall Farmhouse | II | Cherrygarden Lane | | | 3 December 1986 | TR2676553074; 51°13′54″N 1°14′48″E | | 1099135 | Upload Photo | Q26391290 |
| Mount Ephraim House | II | Cherrygarden Lane | | | 3 December 1986 | TR2632753356; 51°14′04″N 1°14′26″E | | 1070268 | Upload Photo | Q26323983 |
| 1 and 2 Home Farm Cottages | II | 1 and 2 Home Farm Cottages, Easole Street | | | 3 December 1986 | TR2622752196; 51°13′27″N 1°14′19″E | | 1363262 | Upload Photo | Q26645098 |
| Barn About 8 Metres North of Barn Cottage | II | Easole Street | | | 12 December 1979 | TR2624352181; 51°13′26″N 1°14′19″E | | 1070238 | Upload Photo | Q26323934 |
| Barn and Stable Range About 5 Metres East of White House Farmhouse | II | Easole Street | | | 3 December 1986 | TR2601752172; 51°13′26″N 1°14′08″E | | 1070270 | Upload Photo | Q26323987 |
| Four Limes | II | Easole Street | | | 3 December 1986 | TR2593452094; 51°13′24″N 1°14′03″E | | 1099934 | Upload Photo | Q26392042 |
| Greystones House Opposite Red Tiles | II | Easole Street | | | 3 December 1986 | TR2600252101; 51°13′24″N 1°14′07″E | | 1363240 | Upload Photo | Q26645077 |
| Home Farmhouse | II | Easole Street | | | 3 December 1986 | TR2623452211; 51°13′27″N 1°14′19″E | | 1070236 | Upload Photo | Q26323930 |
| Lime Tree Cottage | II | Easole Street | | | 26 October 1978 | TR2621552187; 51°13′26″N 1°14′18″E | | 1070235 | Upload Photo | Q26323928 |
| Old Malthouse | II | Easole Street | | | 11 October 1963 | TR2628652230; 51°13′28″N 1°14′22″E | | 1363263 | Upload Photo | Q26645099 |
| Red Tiles | II | Easole Street | | | 3 December 1986 | TR2605552189; 51°13′27″N 1°14′10″E | | 1363239 | Upload Photo | Q26645076 |
| Southdown Cottage | II* | Easole Street | thatched cottage | | 23 April 1980 | TR2609252064; 51°13′23″N 1°14′11″E | | 1070271 | Southdown Cottage More images | Q17557694 |
| Southdown House | II | Easole Street | | | 3 December 1986 | TR2611452060; 51°13′23″N 1°14′13″E | | 1099929 | Upload Photo | Q26392038 |
| St Michaels | II | Easole Street | | | 3 December 1986 | TR2617852111; 51°13′24″N 1°14′16″E | | 1363264 | Upload Photo | Q26645100 |
| Stables About 5 Metres South East of White House Farmhouse | II | Easole Street | | | 3 December 1986 | TR2599852157; 51°13′26″N 1°14′07″E | | 1348699 | Upload Photo | Q26632060 |
| The Old House | II | Easole Street | | | 11 October 1963 | TR2618852169; 51°13′26″N 1°14′17″E | | 1070276 | Upload Photo | Q26323998 |
| Trinity Court | II | Easole Street | | | 3 December 1986 | TR2616352141; 51°13′25″N 1°14′15″E | | 1348498 | Upload Photo | Q26631874 |
| Wall and Railings About 4 Metres South East of Four Limes | II | Easole Street | | | 3 December 1986 | TR2593752087; 51°13′24″N 1°14′04″E | | 1070269 | Upload Photo | Q26323985 |
| White House Farmhouse | II | Easole Street | | | 3 December 1986 | TR2599252173; 51°13′26″N 1°14′07″E | | 1348670 | Upload Photo | Q26632033 |
| Rose Cottages | II | 1 and 2, Frogham | | | 3 December 1986 | TR2560850363; 51°12′28″N 1°13′43″E | | 1099907 | Upload Photo | Q26392015 |
| Frogham Cottage | II | Frogham | | | 3 December 1986 | TR2578250396; 51°12′29″N 1°13′52″E | | 1100344 | Upload Photo | Q26392483 |
| Frogham Farmhouse | II | Frogham | | | 3 December 1986 | TR2572050385; 51°12′29″N 1°13′49″E | | 1070272 | Upload Photo | Q26323989 |
| Gate Cottage | II | Frogham | | | 3 December 1986 | TR2569750630; 51°12′37″N 1°13′48″E | | 1100353 | Upload Photo | Q26392500 |
| Hillside | II | Frogham | | | 3 December 1986 | TR2581550358; 51°12′28″N 1°13′53″E | | 1070273 | Upload Photo | Q26323992 |
| House About 30 Metres West of Gate Cottage ( Park Farm) | II | Frogham | | | 3 December 1986 | TR2566250633; 51°12′37″N 1°13′46″E | | 1363241 | Upload Photo | Q26645078 |
| Vine Cottage | II | Frogham | | | 3 December 1986 | TR2570350611; 51°12′36″N 1°13′48″E | | 1348502 | Upload Photo | Q26631878 |
| Granary About 20 Metres South East of Holt Street Farmhouse | II | Holt Street | | | 3 December 1986 | TR2506951538; 51°13′07″N 1°13′18″E | | 1363242 | Upload Photo | Q26645079 |
| Holt Street Farmhouse and Garden Wall | II | Holt Street | | | 13 October 1952 | TR2505951566; 51°13′08″N 1°13′17″E | | 1070274 | Upload Photo | Q26323994 |
| Lodge to Fredville Park | II | Holt Street | | | 11 October 1963 | TR2567751850; 51°13′16″N 1°13′50″E | | 1070275 | Upload Photo | Q26323996 |
| Stables About 40 Metres South of Holt Street Farmhouse | II | Holt Street | | | 3 December 1986 | TR2505051520; 51°13′07″N 1°13′17″E | | 1348506 | Upload Photo | Q26631882 |
| Tall Chimneys and Number 9 | II | 9, Mill Lane | | | 3 December 1986 | TR2635352084; 51°13′23″N 1°14′25″E | | 1070239 | Upload Photo | Q26323936 |
| Barn Cottage | II | Mill Lane | | | 11 October 1963 | TR2625052167; 51°13′26″N 1°14′20″E | | 1070237 | Upload Photo | Q26323932 |
| Farthingales | II | Old Court Hill | | | 13 October 1952 | TR2523652367; 51°13′34″N 1°13′28″E | | 1363265 | Upload Photo | Q26645101 |
| Pinners Cottages | II | 1 and 2, Pinners Hill | | | 3 December 1986 | TR2554352562; 51°13′40″N 1°13′44″E | | 1100237 | Upload Photo | Q26392324 |
| Pinners Farmhouse | II | Pinners Hill | | | 3 December 1986 | TR2547253243; 51°14′02″N 1°13′42″E | | 1070240 | Upload Photo | Q26323938 |
| Charnel House Or Mortuary Chapel About 20 Metres South of Church of St Mary | II | Pinners Lane | | | 3 December 1986 | TR2531852368; 51°13′34″N 1°13′32″E | | 1101555 | Upload Photo | Q26395107 |
| Church of St Mary | I | Pinners Lane | church building | | 11 October 1963 | TR2530752348; 51°13′33″N 1°13′32″E | | 1070241 | Church of St Mary More images | Q17529725 |
| Fairfields Oaklands | II | Pinners Lane | | | 3 December 1986 | TR2539552400; 51°13′35″N 1°13′36″E | | 1101533 | Upload Photo | Q26395053 |
| Monument to Ellen Massey 10 Metres North of Church of St Mary | II | Pinners Lane | | | 3 December 1986 | TR2531052367; 51°13′34″N 1°13′32″E | | 1363266 | Upload Photo | Q26645102 |
| Caretakers Cottage and Stable Court, St Albans Court | II | St Albans Court | | | 2 January 1986 | TR2634152470; 51°13′35″N 1°14′25″E | | 1101485 | Upload Photo | Q26394956 |
| Garden Walls South and East of Old St Albans Court | II | St Albans Court | | | 11 June 1986 | TR2634152528; 51°13′37″N 1°14′25″E | | 1101506 | Upload Photo | Q26395001 |
| Gate Piers and Flanking Walls About 40 Metres North East of Stable Court, St Albans Court | II | St Albans Court | | | 11 June 1986 | TR2637352517; 51°13′37″N 1°14′27″E | | 1070244 | Upload Photo | Q26323940 |
| Old St Albans Court and Wall | II* | St Albans Court | | | 11 June 1986 | TR2632252525; 51°13′37″N 1°14′24″E | | 1070243 | Upload Photo | Q17557681 |
| St Albans Court | I | St Albans Court | building | | 13 October 1952 | TR2635752640; 51°13′41″N 1°14′26″E | | 1070242 | St Albans Court More images | Q17529728 |
| Swedish Dance Theatre to North West of St Albans Court | II | St Albans Court | | | 11 June 1986 | TR2634352712; 51°13′43″N 1°14′26″E | | 1070245 | Upload Photo | Q26323942 |
| Terrace Wall and Steps to South East and South West of St Albans Court | II | St Albans Court | | | 11 June 1986 | TR2637052614; 51°13′40″N 1°14′27″E | | 1347885 | Upload Photo | Q26631307 |
| Wall and Gateways to North Forecourt of St Albans Court | II | St Albans Court | | | 11 June 1986 | TR2636552702; 51°13′43″N 1°14′27″E | | 1363267 | Upload Photo | Q26645103 |
| Church Cottage | II | Vicarage Lane | | | 13 October 1952 | TR2534852302; 51°13′31″N 1°13′34″E | | 1070246 | Upload Photo | Q26323944 |
| Field Cottage Rosemarin Cottage | II | Vicarage Lane | | | 8 October 1986 | TR2539352287; 51°13′31″N 1°13′36″E | | 1101742 | Upload Photo | Q26395499 |
| Hatchetts | II | Vicarage Lane | | | 3 December 1986 | TR2541451980; 51°13′21″N 1°13′36″E | | 1101757 | Upload Photo | Q26395529 |
| Toll Cottage | II | Vicarage Lane | | | 13 October 1952 | TR2531952299; 51°13′31″N 1°13′32″E | | 1070247 | Toll Cottage | Q26323946 |

== See also ==
- Grade I listed buildings in Kent
- Grade II* listed buildings in Kent

== Sources ==
- Newman, John (2013) [1969], Kent: North-East and East, The Buildings of England, New Haven and London: Yale University Press, ISBN 978-0-300-18506-5
