= AYH =

AYH may refer to:

- American Youth Hostels
- Arcadis AYH plc, a London-based surveying firm
- Alvin Youngblood Hart, an American musician
- Aylesham railway station, Kent, England (National Rail station code AYH)
- Hadrami Arabic (ISO 639-3 ayh), an Arabic variety spoken by the Hadhrami people
