= Listed buildings in Aylesham =

Civil Parish in Kent, England

Aylesham is a village and civil parish in the Dover District of Kent, England. It contains ten listed buildings that are recorded in the National Heritage List for England. Of these one is grade I and nine are grade II.

This list is based on the information retrieved online from Historic England.

== Key ==
Grade	Criteria
I	Buildings that are of exceptional interest
II*	Particularly important buildings of more than special interest
II	Buildings that are of special interest

== Listing ==
Name	Grade	Location	Type	Completed (Note: The date given is the date used by Historic England as significant for the initial building or that of an important part in the structure's description.)	Date designated	Grid ref. (Note: The grid reference is based on the British national grid reference system, sometimes known as OSGB36, used by the Ordnance Survey.) Geo-coordinates	Notes	Entry number (Note: The "List Entry Number" is a unique number assigned to each listed building and scheduled monument by Historic England.)	Image	Wikidata
Fan House and Winder House (koepe) No. 2 at Snowdown Colliery	II				18 May 2007	TR2472951244; 51°12′58″N 1°12′59″E		1391968	Upload Photo	Q26671296
Barn About 60 Metres East of Old Court Farmhouse	II	Old Court			3 December 1986	TR2458853292; 51°14′05″N 1°12′57″E		1070302	Upload Photo	Q26324042
Granary About 30 Metres East of Old Court Farmhouse	II	Old Court			3 December 1986	TR2456553301; 51°14′05″N 1°12′56″E		1363217	Upload Photo	Q26645054
Old Court Farmhouse and Forecourt	II	Old Court			3 December 1986	TR2453153310; 51°14′05″N 1°12′54″E		1070301	Upload Photo	Q26324040
Barn at Ratling Court Farm	II	Ratling			14 May 1984	TR2406053620; 51°14′16″N 1°12′30″E		1070304	Upload Photo	Q26324046
Donkey Wheel About 15 Metres North of Ratling Court	II	Ratling			3 December 1986	TR2399053708; 51°14′19″N 1°12′27″E		1070303	Upload Photo	Q26324044
Ratling Court	I	Ratling			11 October 1963	TR2398153690; 51°14′18″N 1°12′26″E		1363218	Upload Photo	Q17529778
Ratling Farm House	II	Ratling			3 December 1986	TR2415153492; 51°14′12″N 1°12′35″E		1070305	Upload Photo	Q26324048
Ratling House	II	Ratling			3 December 1986	TR2416753513; 51°14′12″N 1°12′36″E		1363220	Upload Photo	Q26645056
Stables About 20 Metres South of Ratling Court	II	Ratling			3 December 1986	TR2397753660; 51°14′17″N 1°12′26″E		1363219	Upload Photo	Q26645055

== See also ==
- Grade I listed buildings in Kent
- Grade II* listed buildings in Kent

== Sources ==
- Newman, John (2013) [1969], Kent: North-East and East, The Buildings of England, New Haven and London: Yale University Press, ISBN 978-0-300-18506-5
