= Aylesham railway station =

Railway station in Kent, England

Aylesham
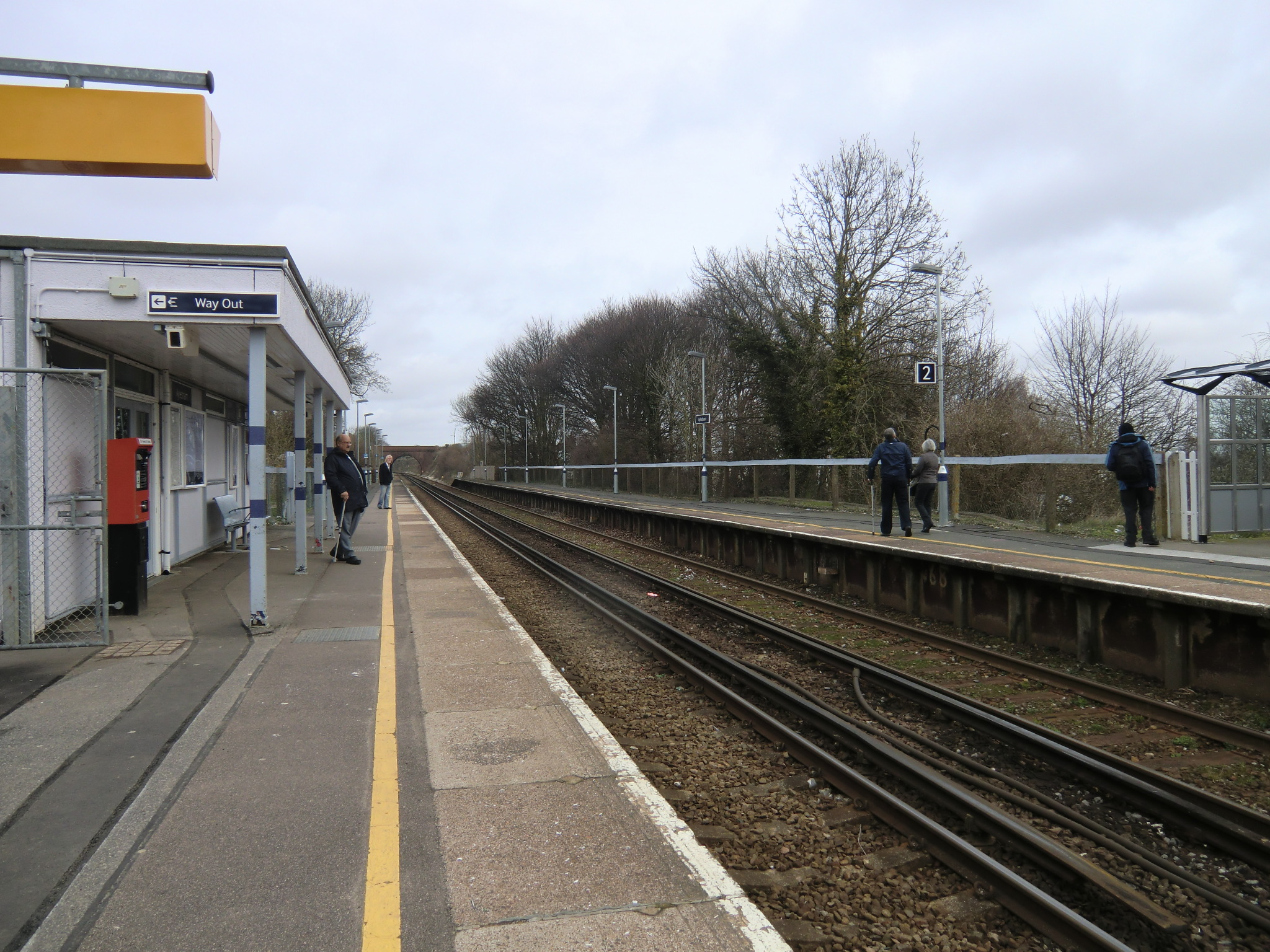

General information
- Location: Aylesham, District of Dover; England
- Coordinates: 51.227367°N 1.209483°E
- Grid reference: TR241524
- Managed by: Southeastern
- Platforms: 2

Other information
- Station code: AYH
- Classification: DfT category E

History
- Opened: 1 July 1928

Passengers
- 2020/21: ▼44,884
- 2021/22: ▲96,992
- 2022/23: ▲0.103 million
- 2023/24: ▼0.101 million
- 2024/25: ▲0.106 million
Location
Notes
- Passenger statistics from the Office of Rail and Road

Aylesham railway station is on the Dover branch of the Chatham Main Line; it serves the village of Aylesham, in Kent, England. It is 68 miles 66 chains (110.8 km) down the line from London Victoria, situated between Adisham and Snowdown. The station and all trains that call are operated by Southeastern.

== History ==
It was built by the Southern Railway and opened on 1 July 1928 to cater for the considerable increase in passenger traffic brought about by the development of the Kent coalfield.

The station passed to the Southern Region of British Railways on nationalisation in 1948.

When sectorisation was introduced in the 1980s, the station was served by Network SouthEast until the privatisation of British Rail.

== Facilities ==
The station booking office is staffed on Mondays to Saturdays mornings and a self-service ticket machine is located on the London-bound platform.

The main station buildings are on the London-bound side of the station.

== Services ==
All services at Aylesham are operated by Southeastern using Class 375 electric multiple units.

The typical off-peak service in trains per hour is:

- 1 tph to London Victoria, via Chatham
- 1 tph to Dover Priory.

Additional services including trains to and from London Bridge and London Cannon Street call at the station in peak hours.

Preceding station	National Rail	Following station
Adisham	Southeastern Chatham Main Line - Dover Branch	Snowdown
