= Kent Coalfield =

Coal mining area in England

Coordinates: 51°13′N 1°18′E

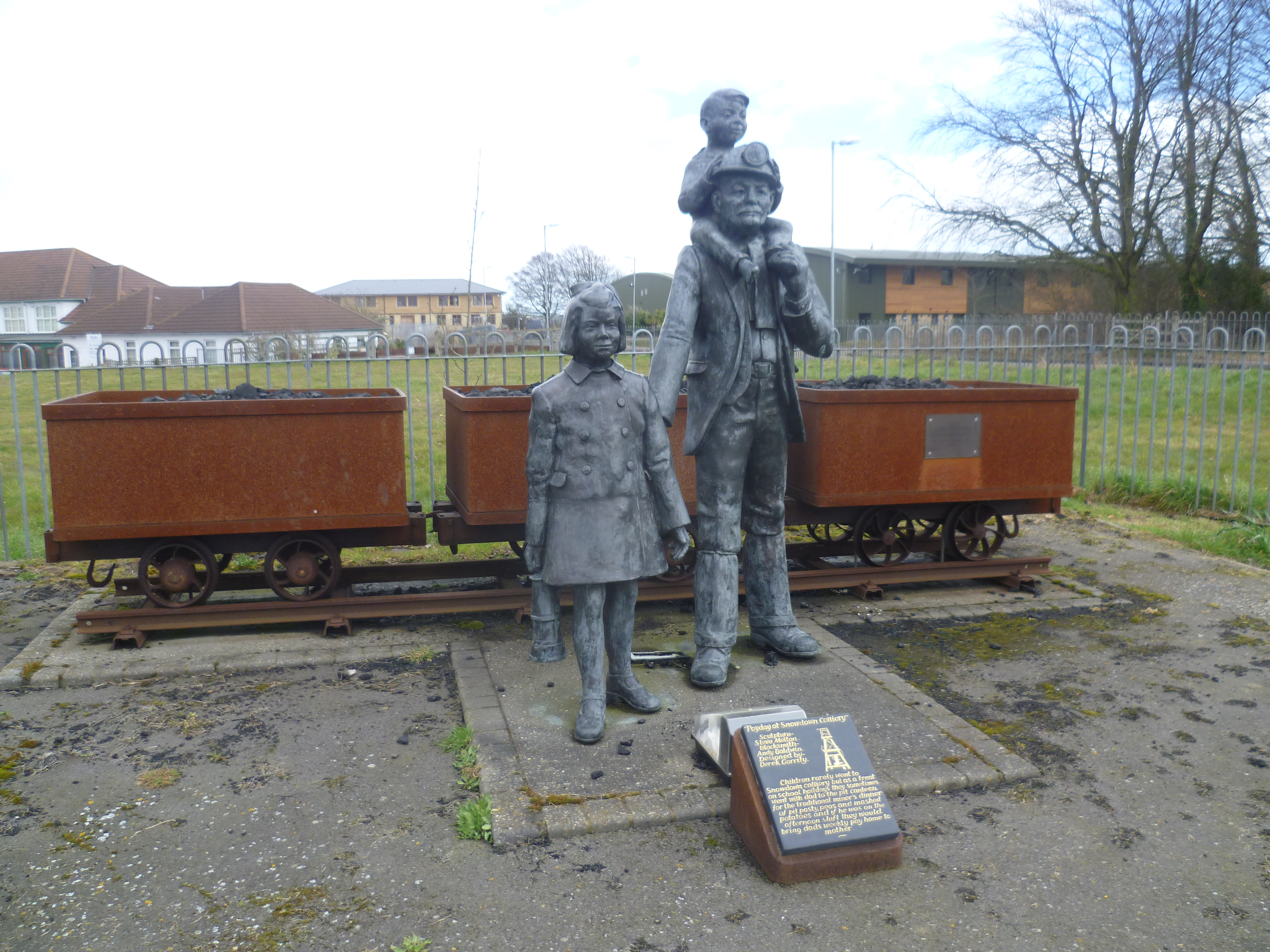
Payday at Snowdown Colliery - sculpture

The Kent Coalfield is a coalfield in the eastern part of the English county of Kent. The Coalfields Trust defines the Kent Coalfield as the wards of Barham Downs and Marshside in the Canterbury district, and the wards of Aylesham, Eastry, Eythorne & Shepherdswell, Middle Deal & Sholden, Mill Hill and North Deal in the Dover district.

Coal was discovered in the area in 1890 when abandoned borings for the first Channel Tunnel project were used to investigate the local geology; the resultant Shakespeare colliery lasted until 1915.

In 1911, investigation into whether there was other workable coal was planned. Six 'bore holes' were put down in search of coal (at Rushbourne, Hoads Wood in Sturry, Herne Bay, Reculver, Chitty (which is near Chislet) and Chislet Park near the future site of Hersden). In the early years many collieries were sunk, and the East Kent Light Railway was built to exploit the anticipated business.

Extensive plans had been drawn up by 1914 for major coal exploitation in east Kent, and the coalfield expanded rapidly in the late 1920s and early 1930s, with its maximum output reached in 1936. The outbreak of war and disappointing test results resulted in four collieries surviving: Betteshanger, Chislet, Snowdown and Tilmanstone. Had coal been more easily accessible, the open, rural landscape of east Kent could have changed beyond recognition.

== Geology ==
Various geologists, including Robert Godwin-Austen, theorised that the geological conditions in East Kent were conducive to the existence of coal and therefore the potential for coal mining. Godwin-Austen put forward his views in 1857, and they were accepted by Sir Joseph Prestwich, who was a member of the Royal Coal Commission from 1866 to 1871.

The rock sequences found in the "concealed coalfields", all those of the counties of Kent, Berkshire and Oxfordshire have been formally renamed in recent years using terms established for the South Wales Coalfield. Much of the strata now assigned to the Warwickshire Group was formerly assigned to the Upper Coal Measures. The following seams are recognised. They are listed in stratigraphical order with the uppermost/youngest at the top and the lowermost/oldest at the bottom:

Warwickshire Group
- Kent No. 1 (Beresford) seam
- Kent No. 2
- Kent No. 3
- Kent No. 4
- Kent No. 5
- Kent No. 6 (Millyard) seam
(South Wales) Upper Coal Measures
- no coals
(South Wales) Middle Coal Measures
- Kent No. 7 (Chislet No. 5) seam
- Kent No. 8
- Kent No. 9
- Kent No. 10
- Kent No. 11
(South Wales) Lower Coal Measures
- Kent No. 12
- Kent No. 13
- Kent No. 14

The Boulonnais coalfield of northern France is considered to be the south-easterly extension of the Kent coalfield.

== Test bores ==
Test bores were made at the following places:-

- Brabourne – bore to a depth of 2,004 feet (611 m), no coal found.
- Ropersole, Barham – bore to a depth of 2,129 feet (649 m), twelve thin seams found.
- Ellinge, Dover – bore to a depth of 1,686 feet (514 m), coal measures found, boring continued another 129 feet (39.32 m), but no seams found.
- Waldershare – bore to a depth of 2,372 feet (723 m) or more, five coal seams found.
- Fredville, Nonington – bore to a depth of 1,505 feet (459 m) or more in December 1896, three coal seams found.
- Goodnestone – bore to a depth of nearly 1,000 feet (300 m), no coal found. It was thought that the seams lay at a depth of 4,000 feet (1,200 m).
- Shakespeare Cliff – bore to a depth of 2,274 feet (693 m) in February 1890. Fourteen seams of coal found.
- Plaxtol – a bore was sunk near Old Soar Manor in 1898, but was abandoned.

== Collieries ==
=== Betteshanger ===
Standing to the northwest of Deal, this colliery was served by a branch off the Minster to Dover line. The colliery opened in 1924, the first coal was raised in 1927. In 1945, the workforce was 2,033, with 1,594 being employed sub-surface and 439 above. Betteshanger was infamously the location of the 1942 Betteshanger miners' strike, the only such action during World War II, which raised much public contempt despite justification. Betteshanger was the last pit to return to work following the 1984–85 Miners' Strike and it closed on 26 August 1989. A few of the buildings survive today.

Shafts sunk

- No. 1. 2,126 feet (648 m)
- No. 2. 2,426 feet (739 m)

=== Chislet ===
Work began at Chislet in 1914, and the colliery produced its first coal in 1918. The fact that its owners, the Anglo-Westphalian Kent Coalfield Ltd., had German connections caused questions to be asked in Parliament. The company changed its name to the North Kent Coalfield Ltd., and later to Chislet Colliery Ltd. The colliery was served by the Ashford to Minster railway, and a halt was built to serve the miners. In 1945, the workforce was 1,350, with 1,023 being employed sub-surface and 327 above. In 1963-4 a 1 2/3 mi (2.7 km) 550V.dc railway was built into the south eastern area of the mine. It had formerly used battery locomotives. The colliery closed on 25 July 1969, the abandonment of steam traction by British Rail having taken away the market for its coal. Houses for the miners were built at Hersden, which still has a social club named the Chislet Colliery Social Club.

Locomotives

- Yorkshire Engine Company 0-6-0ST (works # 2498, built 1951) worked at Chislet Colliery from 1960 until its closure. It has been preserved and now bears the name Chislet.
- Barclay 0-6-0DM (works # 382, built 1955) – following closure of the mine this locomotive moved to the Snowdown Colliery Railway.

Shafts sunk

- North 1,470 feet (450 m)
- South 1,467 feet (447 m)

=== Snowdown ===
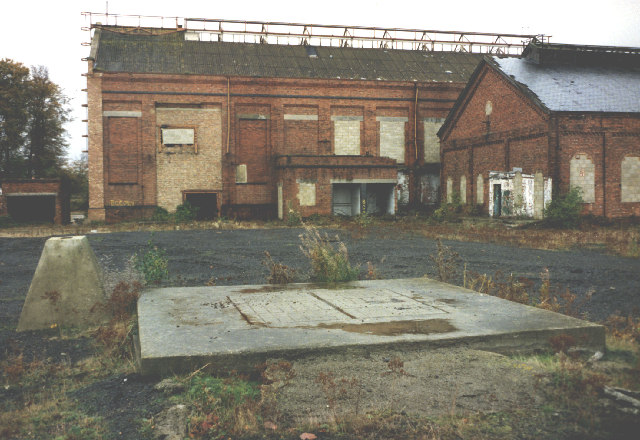
Snowdown Colliery, August 1992

Snowdown was the deepest mine in Kent at 3083 feet. Work commenced in 1908, and coal was first brought to the surface on 19 November 1912. The first shaft sunk hit water at 260 feet (79 m) and 22 men were drowned. Snowdown, reaching a depth of 3,083 feet (940 m). The colliery was served by the Faversham to Dover railway, and a halt (Snowdown and Nonington Halt) was provided. In 1945 the workforce was 1,876, with 1,523 being employed sub-surface and 353 above. The colliery closed in 1987 and the shafts were capped in 1988. A few ruinous buildings remain today.

Shafts sunk

- No 1. 262 feet (80 m)
- No 2. 3,083 feet (940 m)
- No 3. 2,994 feet (913 m)

==== Snowdown Colliery railway ====
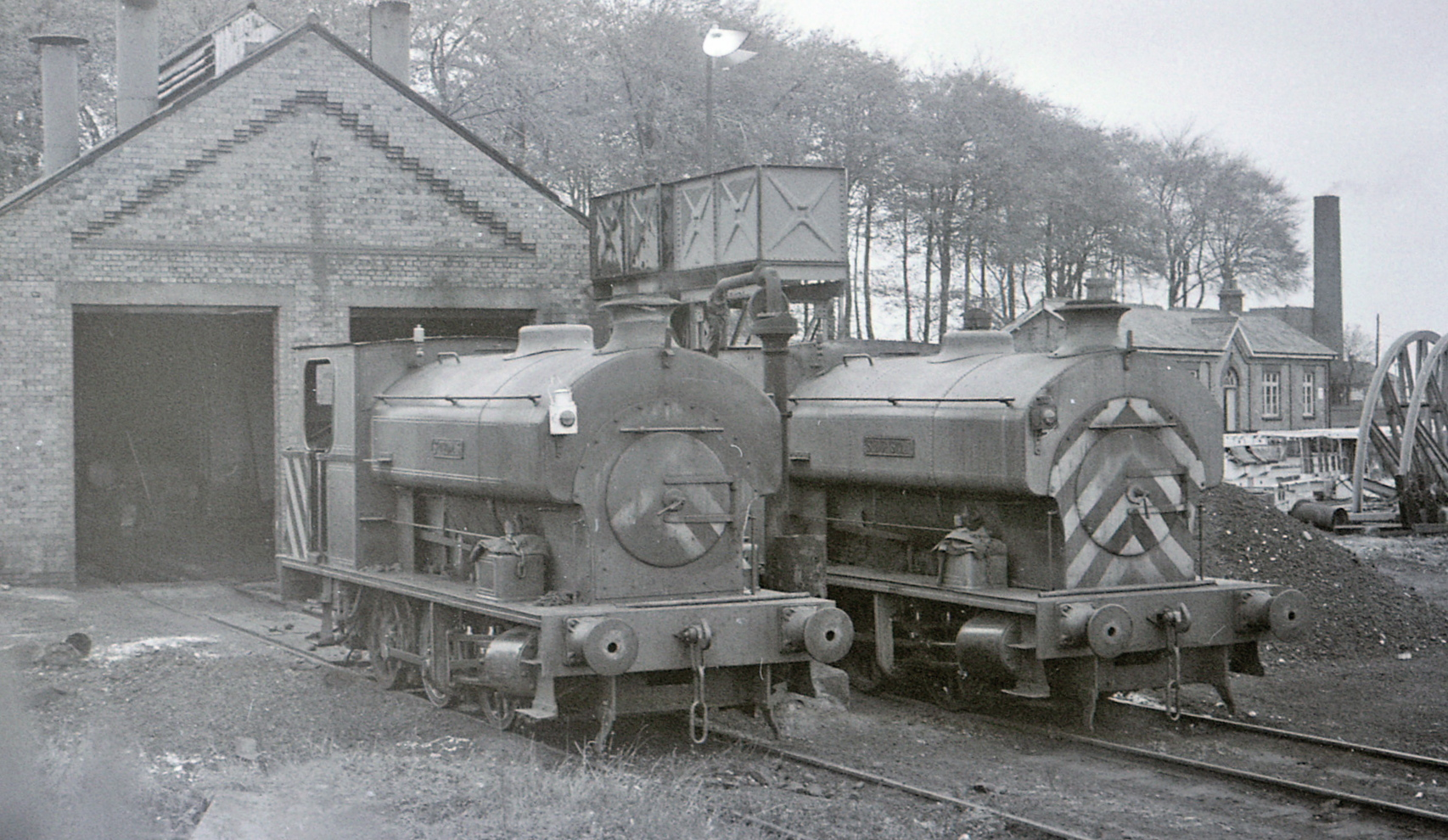
Two of the Snowdown Saint locomotives in 1968.

The colliery had an extensive internal standard gauge rail network, connected to the mainline at Snowdown and Nonington Halt. The line was operated by steam locomotives, the last of which survived in working condition after the demise of steam traction on the national mainline in 1968. The colliery railway was by then using a mixed fleet of steam and diesel locomotives, with the final steam withdrawals taking place in the late 1970s. The final three steam locomotives were named after saints with nearby Canterbury connections. St Thomas (named for St Thomas of Canterbury), St Dunstan (named for Dunstan, also a medieval Archbishop of Canterbury), and St Martin (named for St Martin, patron of England's oldest parish church, St Martin's Church, Canterbury). The colliery railway network was dismantled following the closure of the colliery in 1987. St Thomas and St Dunstan both survive into preservation. St Martin, which had been badly damaged when its tanks were left full of water which froze on a winter night, was scrapped.

Locomotives

- Avonside 0-6-0ST St Thomas (works # 1971, built 1927) – survives as an exhibit at Dover Transport Museum.
- Avonside 0-6-0ST St Dustan (works # 2004, built 1927) – this locomotive has been preserved.
- Avonside 0-6-0ST St Martin
- Fowler 0-4-0DM (works # 416002, built 1952) – this locomotive has been preserved.
- Barclay 0-6-0DM (works # 382, built 1955) – this locomotive previously worked at Chislet Colliery Railway.

In the final days before closure the railway was worked by British Rail Class 08 shunter engines.

=== Tilmanstone ===
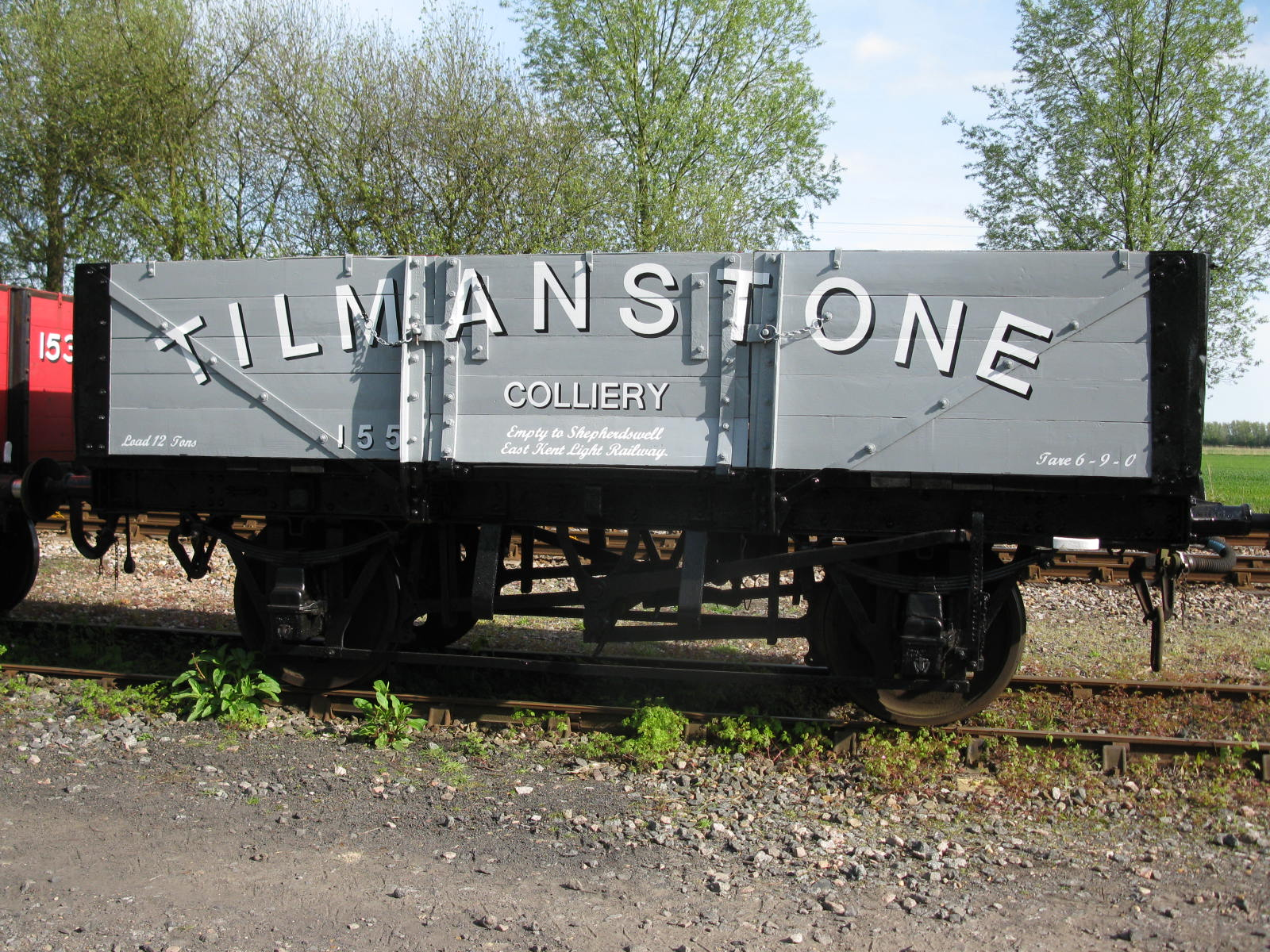
An open wagon in the livery of Tilmanstone Colliery

Work was commenced at Tilmanstone in 1911. An accident in 1913 killed three men and destroyed the pumping system, causing the mine to flood and work was abandoned for nine months. The site was connected to the East Kent Light Railway in 1915 and coal first brought to the surface in March 1916. An accident at the pit on 27 February 1931 resulted in Sydney William Padfield being awarded a bronze Edward Medal, the only one awarded in the Kent Coalfield. An aerial ropeway was built in 1930 to link the pit with Dover Harbour. This included tunnelling through the cliff at Dover to deliver the coal to a 5,000 ton bunker at the harbour. It wasn't used much after 1935, and was dismantled in 1954. In 1945, the workforce was 914, with 631 being employed sub-surface and 283 above. The colliery closed in 1988, having produced over 20,000,000 tons of coal. A system of tokens was used in the pithead baths and canteen and a lamp check was operated, in common with the majority of pits. All buildings have been demolished.

Shafts sunk

- No 1. 1,559 feet (475 m)
- No 2. 2,477 feet (755 m)
- No 3. 2,077 feet (633 m)

== Failed sinkings ==
=== Adisham ===
A colliery was planned at Adisham. It was not commenced.

=== Cobham ===
A mine at Cobham produced a small quantity of brown lignite, although some bituminous coal had been found. It had been mined open-cast, the coal being used by Lord Darnley to heat Cobham Hall. Two drifts were dug into the hillside in 1947; at one point the mine was producing 80 tons per week. The mine closed in 1953 and the site cleared.

=== Guilford ===
The first test shaft was sunk in 1906, hoping to find the coal seams discovered under Waldershare Park. The East Kent Light Railway connected to the pit in November 1912. No coal had been found by 1918, and the colliery closed in the 1920s owing to geological problems. Two buildings remain at the site.

Shafts sunk

- No. 1. 306 feet (93 m)
- No. 2. 1,272 feet (388 m)
- No. 3. 1,272 feet (388 m)

=== Hammill (Woodnesborough) ===
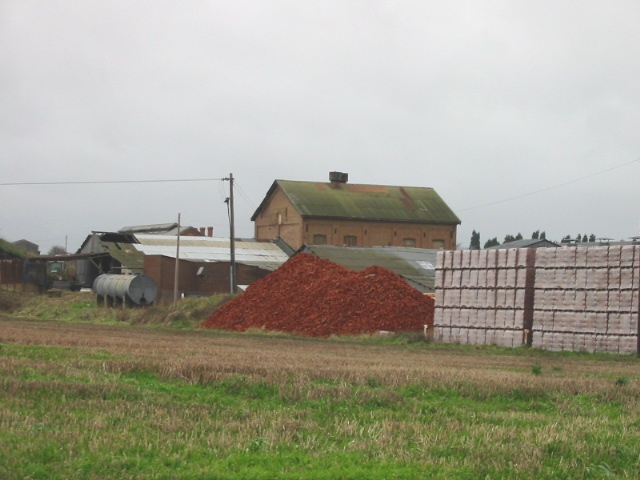
Former colliery building at Hammill Brickworks

This site was located to the south of Woodnesborough. Work here was abandoned in 1914 without coal being found. It was served by a half mile branch off the East Kent Light Railway. The site was subsequently used by the Hammill Brickworks. Some buildings survive.

=== Maydensole ===
This colliery was to have been located near East Langdon. Some boreholes were drilled but work was abandoned without any shafts being sunk.

=== Shakespeare ===
Shakespeare was located in West Hougham on the site of the original Channel Tunnel workings. Coal had been discovered at a depth of 300 metres (980 ft) below Shakespeare Cliff on 15 February 1890. The first shaft was stated on 21 August 1891. A mining accident on 6 March 1897 killed eight men. The cause was a sudden inrush of water at a depth of 366 feet (112 m). This problem was solved by lining the shaft with cast iron tubes as the shaft was sunk. During the sinking a 17 foot (5.2 m) seam of iron ore was discovered. By February 1905, just 12 tons of coal had been brought to the surface. Only 1,000 tons had been raised by 1912 and the colliery closed in December 1915 due to geological problems. Shakespeare Cliff Halt opened in 1913 to serve the miners. The site was obliterated by workings in connection with building the Channel Tunnel in the 1980s.

Shafts sunk

- X 520 feet (160 m)
- Y 1,632 feet (497 m)
- Z 1,632 feet (497 m)

=== Stonehall ===
This colliery was near Lydden. It was abandoned in 1914 without coal being found. It lay derelict until 1919 when work recommenced, only to be abandoned and most of the buildings demolished in 1921. A couple of buildings remain.

Shafts sunk

- North 75 feet (23 m)
- East 273 feet (83 m)
- West 273 feet (83 m)

=== Wingham ===
Work at Wingham was abandoned in 1914, without coal being found. Water had been hit, and there was no finance to buy pumps. The buildings were mothballed and sold in 1924, being used for a milling business. The colliery was to be served by the East Kent Light Railway.

Shafts sunk

- East 50 feet (15 m)
- West 150 feet (46 m)

== Associated development ==
The village of Aylesham was built in the 1920s to provide accommodation to service the Kent coal mines. It was planned to provide for around 30,000 residents, with plans for hospitals, schools, shops etc., but in reality only 1,000 houses were built due to the economic decline the country faced in the early 1930s, which made the original plans unviable at the time.

== Working conditions ==
The Kent coalfields were deep under the chalk; consequently miners worked under extremely hot and humid conditions. A medical investigation into an epidemic that affected workers at the coalface noted:

There are certain well-recognized peculiarities about the Kent coal mines which may have some bearing on the question. In the first place, two of them are exceptionally deep (3,000 ft.), and very hot and wet; the third, that in which the epidemic has occurred, is only moderately deep (1,500 to 1,600 ft.), and is quite dry, but owing to certain peculiarities in its construction it is hotter than either of the other two; moreover, ventilation is said to be a matter of considerable difficulty. The mine is also extremely humid, wet- and dry-bulb temperatures are practically identical. The men work without clothes and sweat profusely; on an average they drink about six pints of water during a shift.

Mine workers came from the north of England, South Wales and other parts of Britain to find work in Kent during the Depression years; some tramped from Scotland. An oral history study found that some miners worked for one shift or less and left without trying to collect their pay, such was the heat and lack of ventilation; those softened by a spell of unemployment found it particularly hard. However, it appears that miners' wives disliked their new environment even more, for they missed the warmth of the traditional mining areas, and local people feared and detested the new immigrants. The women's response influenced the high turnover of labour at the collieries: they wanted to go home.

== See also ==
- Kent Miners' Association
