= Definite article reduction =

Use of vowelless definite articles

Definite article reduction (DAR), in linguistics, is the use of a vowel-less form of the definite article the in Northern dialects of England English, for example in Yorkshire dialect. DAR is often represented by dialect spelling with an apostrophe: ⟨t'⟩ or ⟨th'⟩.

DAR is found in most traditional Northern English varieties and even some North Midlands dialects; however, the dialects of Northumberland, northern County Durham and northern Cumberland are not affected by DAR.

== History ==
DAR has been recorded in textual form since 1673, and the orthographic representations "t'" and "th'" occur in literature (such as in Emily Brontë's Wuthering Heights) and are frequently encountered in the media. The historical origin is unclear. Links with Middle English te forms of the article remain unproved.

A similar usage of an article with a consonant "t'" can also be found in Modern Dutch and in the West Frisian language on the notthern Dutch coast. In these languages, "t" clearly derives from the neuter definite article (Dutch het and West Frisian it) because the Dutch and Frisian masculine and feminine singular as well as plural definite article de cannot become "t").

The family name "Huis in't Feld" exists in Dutch, meaning "house in the field". Claims of that being phonetically similar to DAR remain to be verified experimentally. In Cumbria, a voiceless alveolar plosive (the English t sound) occurs and may have some superficial similarities to realizations in West Frisian and Low German, but the glottal and the glottalised DAR variants that are found elsewhere in the DAR area and across Yorkshire present a very different realisation. Jones (2002: 342) comments that no contact explanation with other varieties of Germanic is required (or could be supported on the basis of available evidence) to explain DAR as the development of DAR involves common cross-linguistic patterns of change (stopping of dental fricatives, change of plosive to glottal) that occur in unrelated languages and so they have a purely phonetic origin.

== Phonetics ==
The phonetic forms of DAR are very varied. The "th'" form suggests a voiceless dental fricative realisation, usually voiceless [θ] (as in thin), and is restricted to the western parts of the DAR area (Lancashire and Cheshire). It also occurred widely across northern and central Staffordshire in earlier dialect surveys (Jones 2002). Sporadic forms similar to DAR were reported to occur in localities in Berkshire, Sussex and Essex and also in Aylesham, in Kent, because of the large influx of miners from Northern England to work in the Kent Coalfield. The "t" form suggests a voiceless alveolar plosive [t] or a voiceless dental plosive realisation [t̪], as in tin, but also serves to represent a 'glottal' form. The glottal form is most widely encountered and is typical of the Yorkshire dialect. In southern County Durham, the definite article is traditionally reduced to [t], as in Cumbrian, but may also be voiced to [d]. Some dialects may show more than one phonetic form, but the conditioning factors for such variation are unknown. It seems that unvarying glottal forms are most widely found now (2005). Variation with a full form the is also common.

Speakers of other forms of English often find it difficult to hear, especially the 'glottal' forms that affect the pitch and duration and voice quality of surrounding words and sounds in subtle ways. This often leads to claims that the article is absent, but this is rarely the case. True absence of the article may occur in the east of the DAR area, in and around Kingston upon Hull.

Instrumental acoustic work in 2007 showed that DAR speakers use very subtle differences in the quality and timing of glottalisation to differentiate between a glottal stop occurring as an allophone of final /t/ in a word like "seat" and a glottal stop occurring as the form of the definite article in otherwise identical sentences (compare "seat sacks" and "see t' sacks"). Speakers of DAR dialects therefore appear to have (put somewhat simplistically) two kinds of glottal stop: one for DAR and one for word-final /t/.

== See also ==
- Weak and strong forms in English
- Trouble at' Mill
