= Snowdown railway station =

Railway station in Kent, England

Coordinates: 51.215°N 1.214°E

Snowdown
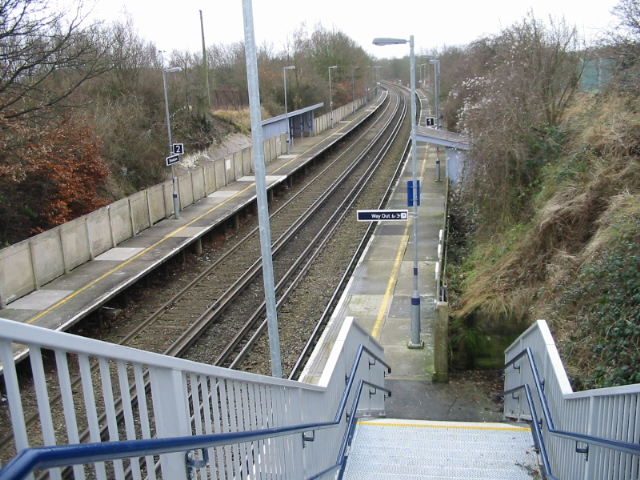

General information
- Location: Snowdown, District of Dover; England
- Grid reference: TR245511
- Manager: Southeastern
- Platforms: 2

Other information
- Station code: SWO
- Classification: DfT category F2

History
- Opened: 1914

Passengers
- 2021/22: ▲10,460
- 2022/23: ▲10,918
- 2023/24: ▲12,070
- 2024/25: ▼11,674
- 2025/26: ▲12,094
Location
Notes
- Passenger statistics from the Office of Rail and Road

Snowdown railway station is on the Dover branch of the Chatham Main Line in England, and serves the hamlet of Snowdown, Kent. It is 69 miles 60 chains (112.3 km) down the line from London Victoria and is situated between Aylesham and Shepherds Well.

The station and all trains that call are operated by Southeastern.

The station and the line it serves was built by the London, Chatham & Dover Railway, and the station was opened in 1914. It was formerly known as Snowdown & Nonington Halt and formed the junction with the extensive sidings of the National Coal Board at Snowdown Colliery.

In 2016–17 and 2017–18 Snowdown was the second least used railway station in Kent, and the least used in 2022-2023.

== Facilities ==
Snowdown station is unstaffed and facilities are limited. Tickets can be purchased from the self-service ticket machine at the station and there are passenger help points located on each platforms. There is also a basic shelter located on each platform.

Step-free access is not available to either of the platforms at the station.

== Services ==
All services at Snowdown are operated by Southeastern using Class 375 EMUs.

The typical off-peak service in trains per hour is:

- 1 tph to London Victoria via Chatham
- 1 tph to Dover Priory

Additional services including trains to and from London Bridge and London Cannon Street call at the station in the peak hours.

| Preceding station | National Rail | Following station |
|---|---|---|
| Aylesham | Southeastern Chatham Main Line - Dover Branch | Shepherds Well |
