= Aylesham =

Village in Kent, England

Coordinates: 51.225278°N 1.201667°E

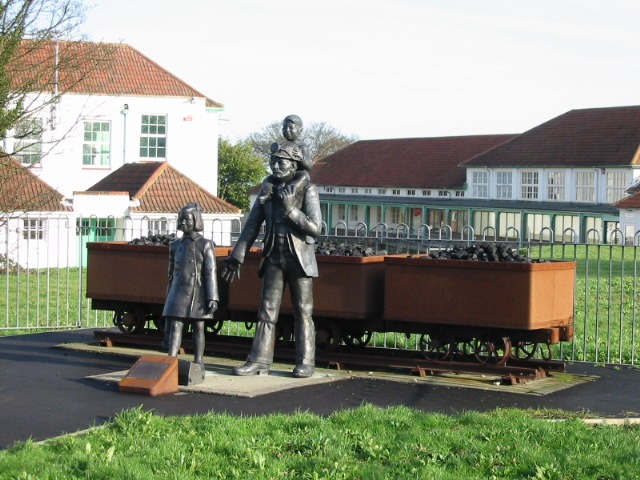
- Commemorative statue showing Aylesham's history of mining

- Location within Kent
- Population: 6,411 (2021)
- OS grid reference: TR237525
- Civil parish: Aylesham
- District: Dover
- Shire county: Kent
- Region: South East
- Country: England
- Sovereign state: United Kingdom
- Post town: CANTERBURY
- Postcode district: CT3
- Dialling code: 01304
- Police: Kent
- Fire: Kent
- Ambulance: South East Coast
- UK Parliament: Dover & Deal

Aylesham /ˈeɪlʃəm/ is a village and civil parish in the Dover district of Kent, England. The village is 6.5 miles (10.5 km) south-east of the cathedral city of Canterbury, and 8.5 miles (13.7 km) north-west of the town and port of Dover. According to the 2001 Census, the parish had a population of 3,884 including Drellingore and Snowdown; it increased to 3,999 at the 2011 Census.

The village was built in the 1920s to accommodate workers at nearby coal mines. The parish also includes the village of Snowdown. Both villages are served by railway stations on the Dover branch of the Chatham Main Line.

== History ==
By British standards, Aylesham is a relatively new village. It was established in 1926 to house miners working in the Kent coal mines. The heads of the first families to be housed there all worked at the nearby newly sunk Snowdown Colliery. It was planned to also accommodate future workers at two other proposed new pits at Adisham and Wingham, but neither colliery was ever built.

Aylesham was part of the parish of Nonington until the creation of a separate parish in 1951.

Although it is still a village, it was originally intended by its masterplanner, Sir Patrick Abercrombie, to grow to be a town with a population of up to 30,000, but only 1,000 houses had been built by the 1960s.

Miners from all parts of the UK (notably South Wales, Scotland and the North East) seeking better wages and safer conditions, travelled to the South East to work at Snowdown Colliery. Due to this, the people of Aylesham have developed a unique dialect, which was the subject of a 2016 article in the Transactions of the Yorkshire Dialect Society. Most residents use the short [a] in words such as bath, as is common in the northern half of the country, and a schwa in words such as strut, as in common in Wales. Some older residents also use glottal stops for the definite article, as in Yorkshire and Lancashire.

The miners brought with them the traditional male voice choir, brass band and Rugby pastimes; all of which are still in evidence today and each of these organisations keep the colliery name as their identity.

During the Second World War, the Aylesham coalminers formed a Home Guard contingent that took part in many rescue operations during the German bombings, especially in Canterbury and the surrounding areas. Old pillboxes can be found in the fields and woods around the village.

Whilst Aylesham could be considered a young village, the location of the village is steeped in history. Over recent years, there have been findings of Saxon skeletons, Bronze Age urns and Roman domestic items within the village. In addition, some of the older properties within the village are evidenced to have been home to Edward of Woodstock, The Black Prince. King Richard II, the son of the Black Prince, ruled England from 1377 until he was deposed in 1399.

Several footballers were sponsored by the Latrobe Soccer Club of Brisbane, Australia, to migrate in the early 1960s; both Henry Brown and Robert Yore came via this way. Brown played and coached at Latrobe, Polonia and Wynnum. Many of the 1960s emigrants settled in a suburb of Brisbane called Acacia Ridge. The resettled families often affectionately referred to this suburb as "Little Aylesham".

Aylesham Fire Station was founded in 1955 and still remains active, despite the closure of other fire stations within the Kent Fire and Rescue Service. Aylesham currently provides emergency cover with the use of an Iveco Eurocargo fire appliance. This state-of-the-art vehicle possesses Compressed Air Foam System (CAFS), fire spike technology, and thermal imaging capabilities.

Aylesham has been identified by the Dover Local Plan as a location for expansion. A Housing Development, proposing 1,200 new homes in the village commenced work in 2014.

== Governance ==
=== County Council ===
Kent County Council is the county authority for Aylesham. Aylesham is part of the Dover North Division of Kent County Council. Services provided include; libraries, social services, highways, education, school transport, byways, PROW and public health.

=== District Council ===
Dover District Council is the District Authority for Aylesham. An electoral ward in the same name exists. The Dover District Council Ward of Aylesham, includes Nonington and had a total population of 4,905 at the 2011 census. Services provided include: elections, housing, parks and open spaces, cemeteries, disabled facilities grants, planning, licensing, council tax collections, waste and recycling.

=== Parish Council ===
Aylesham Parish Council is the lowest tier of local government, responsible to the civil parish of Aylesham. The Parish Council operates in a former doctors' surgery in Dorman Avenue South, which has over the years been satirically coined The White House due to it being a white building and the administrative office of the Parish Council. The official name of the building is Aylesham House and also houses Aylesham Heritage Centre.

Services provided by the parish council include: allotments, grants, recreation grounds, parks, children's play areas, playing fields and youth provision. As the most local council in all the tiers of government, parish councils have the right to be consulted on planning and licensing matters. It was a major stakeholder in the Masterplan of the Aylesham Development. Monthly meetings are held every second Thursday of the month (excluding August) and the council has three committees; Finance, Audit & Personnel, Recreation & Facilities, Planning, and Environment & Transport.

== Poetry ==
Kay Sutcliffe, the wife of a striking miner at Aylesham, wrote the poem "Coal not Dole", which became popular with the Women Against Pit Closures groups across the country and was later made into a song by Norma Waterson.

== Sport and leisure ==
=== Walks ===
The village is on the Miner's Way Trail. The 27-mile circular trail links up the coalfield parishes of East Kent, passing through or near the villages of Goodnestone, Wingham, Ash, Eastry, Betteshanger, Tilmanstone, Elvington, Snowdown and Nonington.

Whilst not passing directly through Aylesham, the northern section of the North Downs Way passes directly by Aylesham Cemetery (1.2 miles south-west to the village) on the B2046 Adisham Road. This trail can be accessed from Aylesham by various footpaths, fields, byway (road) and bridleways. There is a bus stop at the cemetery, where the North Downs Way passes by.

=== Rugby Club ===
The village has a long sporting history, with a rugby club being present in the village since 1930; it has played a prominent role in community life. Before the professionalisation of rugby union, Snowdown Colliery Welfare Rugby Football Club (a name that dates back to when Snowdown Colliery was open) would play teams such as Blackheath F.C., Wasps RFC and Canterbury RFC. Snowdown Colliery Welfare RFC has since remained true to its roots and has not become a professional club, instead concentrating of community rugby provision. The club currently play in the London & SE Division Invicta 2 Premier - East.

In the 2015/2016 season, the rugby club achieved great success by gaining promotion in to Shepherd Neame Kent 1. The club also won the Kent Vase, beating Beccahamian RFC in the final at The Jack Williams Memorial Ground, Aylesford, Kent. The score was Snowdown Colliery 31 - 5 Beccahamian RFC, with the final being heavily attended by the community.

In the 2016/2017 season, Snowdown Colliery Welfare RFC reached the Kent Salver Final, which took place at The Marine Travel Ground in Canterbury. Snowdown Colliery lost 17-7 to Greenwich RFC.

=== Leisure centre ===
Aylesham Welfare Leisure Centre opened in 2011. Owned by the Aylesham & Snowdown Social & Welfare Trust, West Faversham Community Association manages the operations of building on behalf of the Trust; it houses a gym, bar, function room, changing facilities and showers.

=== Aylesham Carnival Association ===
Records show the first carnival held in Aylesham in 1929 was a Coal Queen event. Over the years, the Association has been repeatedly held in abeyance and revived until the late 1990s/early 2000s, when a period of stability emerged; the carnival is now an annual event.

The Aylesham Carnival, held every September, has carnival courts from all round the country take part. This is normally held in conjunction with a fete, fun fair and stalls in the Market Square before the carnival commences.

== Churches ==
=== Aylesham Baptist Church ===
The Baptist Church is situated in Dorman Avenue South and was built in 1927. Regular services take place on a Sunday. The church has a newly erected hall to the rear of the building, which is used by the community for creches, a youth club, breakfast club, Sure Start, coffee mornings and other community events. The minister is Reverend Laura Moncaster.

=== Church of St Peter ===
St Peter's is situated in Dorman Avenue North and was built in 1928; regular services take place on a Sunday. The church organises a Sunbeams toddler group, coffee mornings, Ignite, and runs Alpha courses.The vicar is Reverend Nick Ratcliffe.

=== Catholic Church of St Finbarr ===
St Finbarr's is situated in Market Place. It was built in 1956/1957; it was officially blessed and opened on 28 April 1957 by Canon de Laubenque. Mass takes place on a Sunday at 11.15am and on Wednesday at 10.00am. There is an active Society of Saint Vincent de Paul. The church is also used by the Snowdown Colliery Male Voice Choir for rehearsals. The Aylesham Sunshiners, a club for over-50s, use the church for their activities which include bingo, quizzes and live music.

In 2016, St Finbarr's amalgamated with the Catholic Church of St Paul, in Dover, to become the Catholic Parish of The Good Shepherd. As a result, St Finbarr's and St Paul's now share resources and priests; they work together for the benefit of the Catholic parish. The priests who serve the parish are: Father Gabriel Onoyima and Father Jamie Houghton. The parish is also served by permanent deacon, Deacon Barry Barton.

== Transport ==
Aylesham railway station provides an hourly service in each direction between London Victoria and Dover Priory, via Chatham, Sittingbourne, Faversham and Canterbury East. Services are operated by Southeastern.

Stagecoach South East operates local bus services, including on route 89 to Canterbury.

== Twin town ==
Aylesham is twinned with:

- Courrières, France

== Notable people ==
- George Curtis (1939-2021), footballer. played over 530 games
- Pat Hilton (born 1954), former footballer and manager, played about 100 games
- Dave Carr (1957–2005), footballer, played over 320 games.
