= Drellingore =

Village in Kent, England

Coordinates: 51.124°N 1.2°E

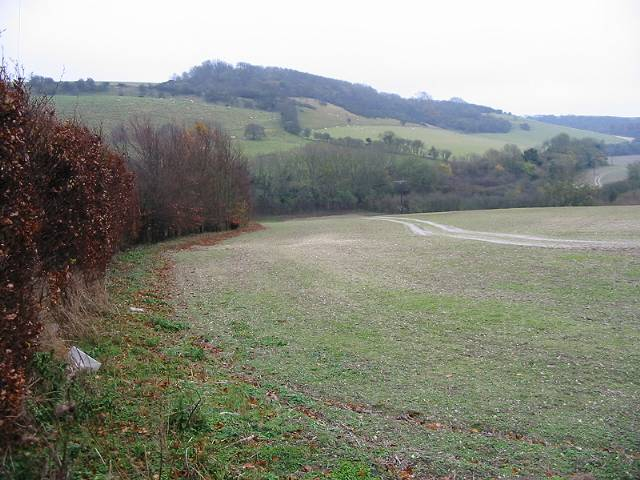
- View across the Alkham Valley, near Drellingore

- Location within Kent
- OS grid reference: TR239410
- District: Dover
- Shire county: Kent
- Region: South East
- Country: England
- Sovereign state: United Kingdom
- Post town: Dover
- Postcode district: CT15
- Dialling code: 01303
- Police: Kent
- Fire: Kent
- Ambulance: South East Coast
- UK Parliament: Dover and Deal

Drellingore is a village in South East Kent, England. It lies in the Alkham Valley, an area of outstanding natural beauty between Folkestone and Dover. Although the Alkham Valley is a dry valley most of the surrounding land forms a water catchment area. Water is extracted from the chalk aquifer for use in the Dover to Folkestone area of Kent. The population is included in the civil parish of Alkham.
