= Snowdown =

Hamlet in Kent, England

Coordinates: 51.215°N 1.21°E

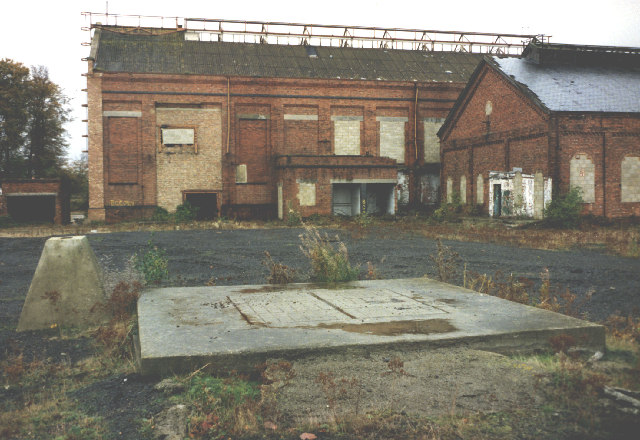
- Capped mine shaft and winding engine house

- Location within Kent
- OS grid reference: TR2451
- District: Dover
- Shire county: Kent
- Region: South East
- Country: England
- Sovereign state: United Kingdom
- Post town: Dover
- Postcode district: CT15 4
- Police: Kent
- Fire: Kent
- Ambulance: South East Coast

Snowdown is a hamlet near Dover in Kent, England. It was the location of one of the four chief collieries of the Kent coalfield, which closed in 1987.

The population of the hamlet is included in the civil parish of Aylesham, Kent. As a result, Snowdown is served by Aylesham Parish Council. The District Authority is Dover District Council and the County Authority is Kent County Council. There are roughly 54 houses in Snowdown.

== History ==
=== Murder of PCSO Julia James ===
On 27 April 2021, Snowdown was the scene of the murder of Julia James. The PCSO was found murdered in woodland. On 8 July 2022, 22-year-old loner Callum Wheeler was jailed for life for James' murder.

== See also ==
- Snowdown railway station
- Snowdown Colliery Railway
