= Nonington =

Civil parish in Kent, England

Coordinates: 51.226°N 1.228°E

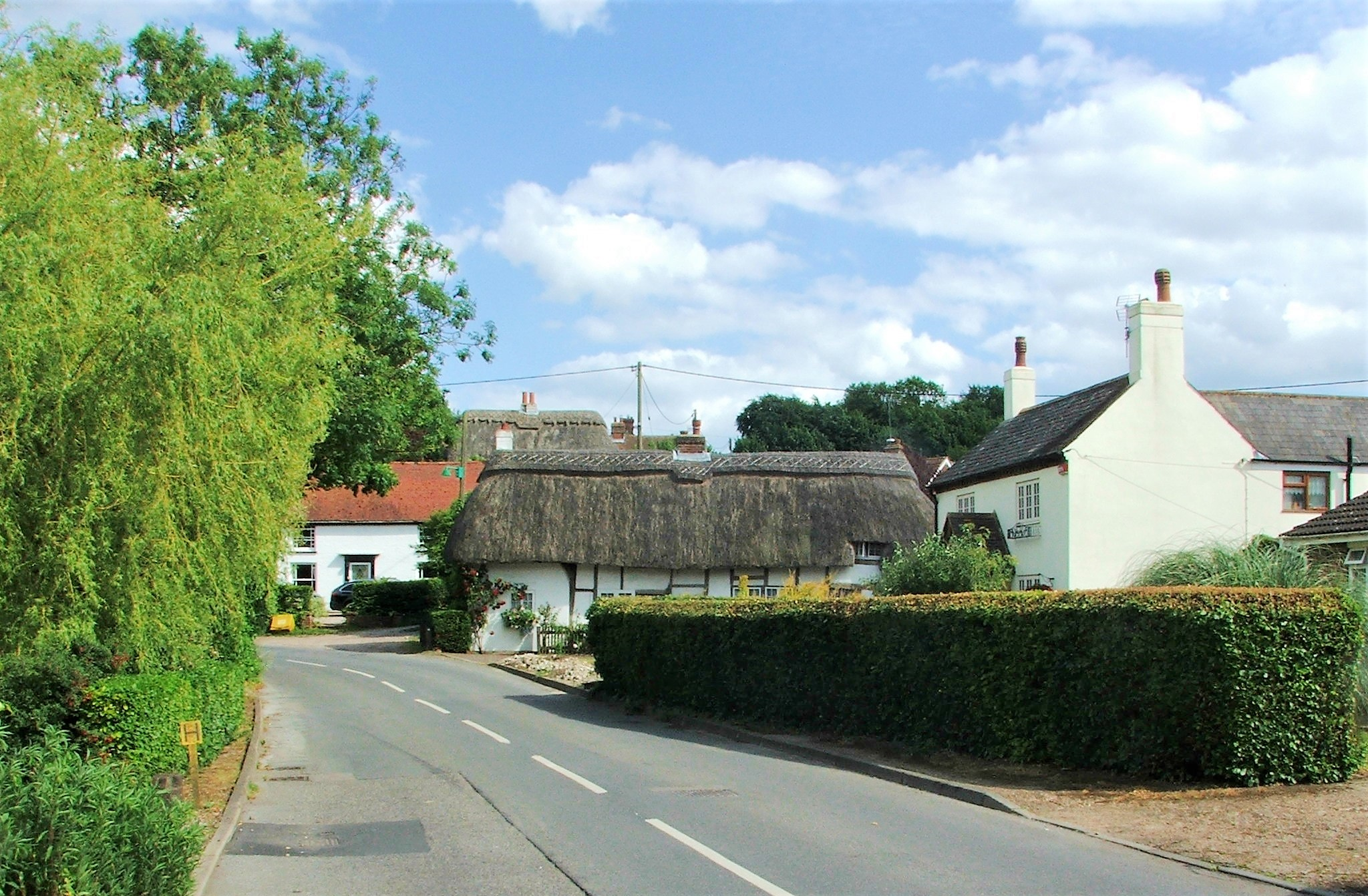
- Easole Street

- Location within Kent
- Area: 3.92 sq mi (10.2 km^{2}) {2020}
- Population: 920 {2021}
  - Density: 235/sq mi (91/km^{2})
- OS grid reference: TR255525
- District: Dover
- Shire county: Kent
- Region: South East
- Country: England
- Sovereign state: United Kingdom
- Post town: Dover
- Postcode district: CT15
- Police: Kent
- Fire: Kent
- Ambulance: South East Coast
- UK Parliament: Dover and Deal

Nonington (variously, Nonnington, Nunyngton, Nonnyngton and Nunnington), is a civil parish and village in east Kent, halfway between the historic city of Canterbury and the channel port town of Dover. The civil parish includes the hamlets of Easole Street, to which it is conjoined, Holt Street and Frogham. The 2021 census gives the population of the parish as 920. The area of the parish at 31 December 2020 is 2,510 acres (1,020 ha).

== History ==
Nonington's entry in The Cambridge Dictionary of English Place-Names states its name derives from Old English as an estate named after the person, Nunna.

Easole Street was known as Oesewalum in the 9th century and Eswalt in the Domesday Book of 1086.

In 1800 Edward Hasted noted that the church of Nonington was an ancient chapel of ease to that of Wingham, but became a separate parish church on the foundation of the college there by Archbishop Peckham in 1286. Hasted described the parish of Nonington as "fine, open champaign country, exceedingly dry and healthy".

The parish of Nonington was part of Eastry Rural District from 1894 to 1974. The separate parish of Aylesham was created from the parish of Nonington in 1951. Prior to the split, an area of 3,808 acres (1,541 ha) is shown for Nonington parish in Volume III of the Victoria County History of Kent, published in 1936.

In the Second World War, there were 43 high explosive bombs, 1 parachute mine, 2 shells, 2 flying bombs, with 12 people killed.

== Geography ==
Natural England has designated the area part of the North Downs National Character Area (NCA 119). A 2004 report for Kent County Council placed Nonington in the East Kent Arable Belt character area of North East Kent. The parkland at Fredville is described as "secluded" and "very handsome", with beech clumps, chestnut trees and pastures. The surrounding land is generally arable, with a mix of larger and smaller fields "divided by hedgerows and shaws through which the winding lanes meander". A Landscape Character Assessment Report for Dover District Council, published in 2020 categorised the local landscape around Nonington as Open Arable Chalk Farmland with Parkland.

The bedrock geology of the parish is white chalk. Superficial geology includes a band of brickearth running through the St Albans and Fredville parklands. In 1939 a denehole was discovered in the village. A brickwork dome covered a 3 feet (0.91 m) diameter brick-lined shaft through a bed of loam to a depth of about 30 feet (9.1 m). Four domed chambers led off the central landing space. The structure was thought to be eighteenth century.

== Church of St Mary ==
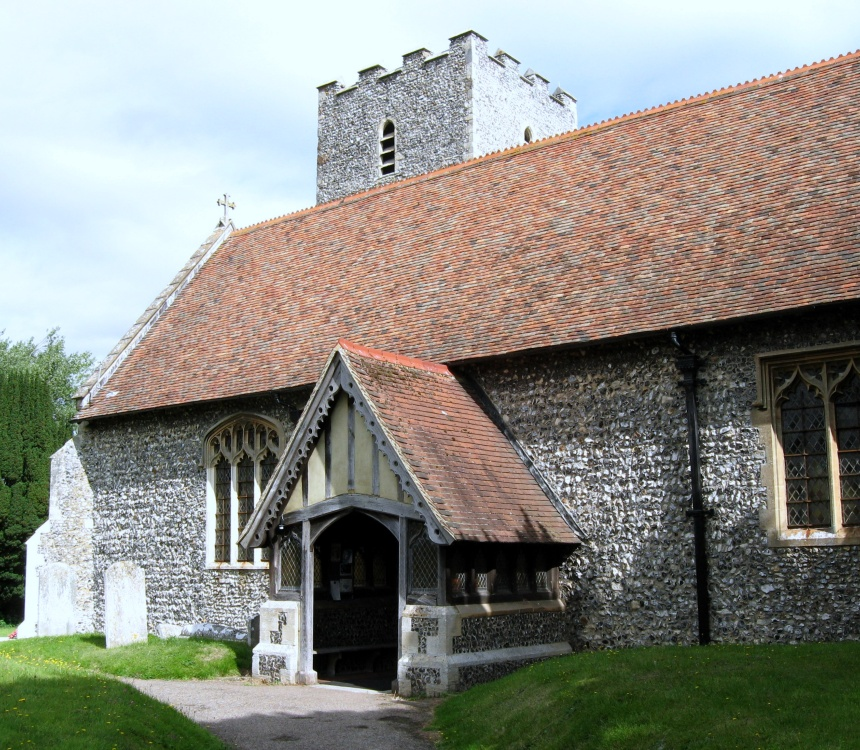
Church of St Mary

The parish church is the Grade I listed 'Church of St Mary'. The church building is constructed of flint and has a plain tiled roof and a two stage tower. Murray's Handbook for Travellers, published in 1858 said the church was Early English, but of "no very great interest". The church underwent restoration in 1887; the nave and north aisle were re-roofed and the wooden beams exposed, teak pews installed and a vestry built in the base of the tower. The church organ is by Norman and Beard and was installed in 1906 and dedicated by parishoners and friends to deceased squires, William Oxenden Hammond and Charles John Plumptre. An article in the Kentish Express in March 1913 described the windows of Early English, Decorated and Perpendicular styles as the "great feature of St Mary's"; the interior is described as "absolutely crowded with memorial tablets", owing to the burials of generations of the Hammonds of St Albans manor and the Plumptres of Fredville.

== St Albans Court ==
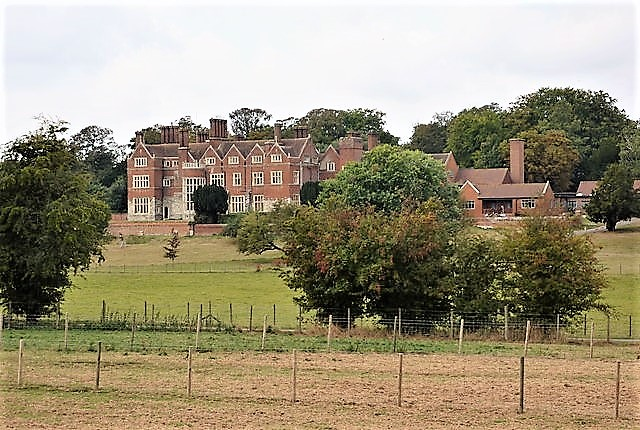
St Albans Court

St Albans Court is a Grade I listed mansion built in the 1870s to the design of architect, George Devey. The client was William Oxenden Hammond, from 1863 senior partner in the Canterbury banking firm of Hammond & Co. He was a keen field sportsman, watercolour artist and in politics a "staunch Conservative". Old St Albans Court to the south west incorporates parts of the medieval manor house. The main building and the old house, plus another 'Tudor cottage' formed an estate with 50 acres of grounds. This estate was the home of the Hammond family from the Reformation until 1937.

The estate was then put up for auction by the family and was purchased by the English Gymnastic Society (EGS), under the redoubtable pioneer, Miss Gladys Wright. The estate was developed into the head office of the EGS and a new training college for female physical education (PE) teachers. The college opened in 1938 as the Nonington College of Physical Education (NCPE). During the war, it was evacuated to Grafton Manor in Bromsgrove and the buildings were taken over by the military 'for the duration'. The college resumed the teaching at St Albans Court at the end of the war, and continued until the retirement of its founder, in 1952. Nonington College was then taken over by Kent County Council, but continued under the same name and with the same goals: the teaching of female PE teachers and the development of PE for women and girls. By 1966 it had become co-educational, but it remained one of the country's leading PE colleges, with a new gym and swimming-pool. Falling birth-rates finally forced its closure in 1986, and the site remained derelict for several years as various proposals were debated.

Nowadays, St Albans Court is used as a boarding school named Beech Grove by the Bruderhof community.

== Fredville ==
Fredville was an ancient manor in the parish of Nonington in the possession of Dover Castle. The manor came into the ownership of William Boys of Bonnington from the neighbouring village of Goodnestone in 1485. On William's death in 1507 Fredville passed to his son, John, who was elected a Member of Parliament for Sandwich in the Reformation Parliament of 1529. The manor passed through successive generations of the Boys family including Sir Edward Boys, who served as Member of Parliament for various constituencies from 1614 to 1646. His descendants sold Fredville to Denzil Holles in 1673. Thomas Holles, Duke of Newcastle sold it in 1745 to Margaret Bridges, sister of Sir Brook Bridges. In 1750 Fredville mansion was built in the Adam style, replacing a farmhouse. Margaret married John Plumptre of Nottingham in 1750, but died without issue in 1756 and Fredville passed to her husband. John Plumptre remarried and resided at Fredville in the latter part of his life. The estate passed on his death in 1791 to his son, also named John Plumptre. John Pemberton Plumptre succeeded to the estate on his father's death in 1827 and his nephew Charles John Plumptre gained Fredville in 1864. Charles John was appointed High Sheriff of Kent in 1877. He was a partner in Hammond, Plumptre & Co. bank of Canterbury, an honorary Lieutenant-Colonel in the East Kent Regiment of the 1st Volunteer Battalion of the Buffs and politically, a "staunch Conservative". Henry Western Plumptre inherited Fredville on the death of his father Charles John Plumptre in 1905. He and his family lived in the Fredville mansion until 1921, then moved to a newly built smaller house in the Park called "Little Fredville". The mansion was used as a girls school in the 1920s and 30s, but was severely damaged by fire in 1941. The grounds were used by the Canadian Army in World War II. Owner John Huntingdon Plumptre had the mansion demolished in 1945.

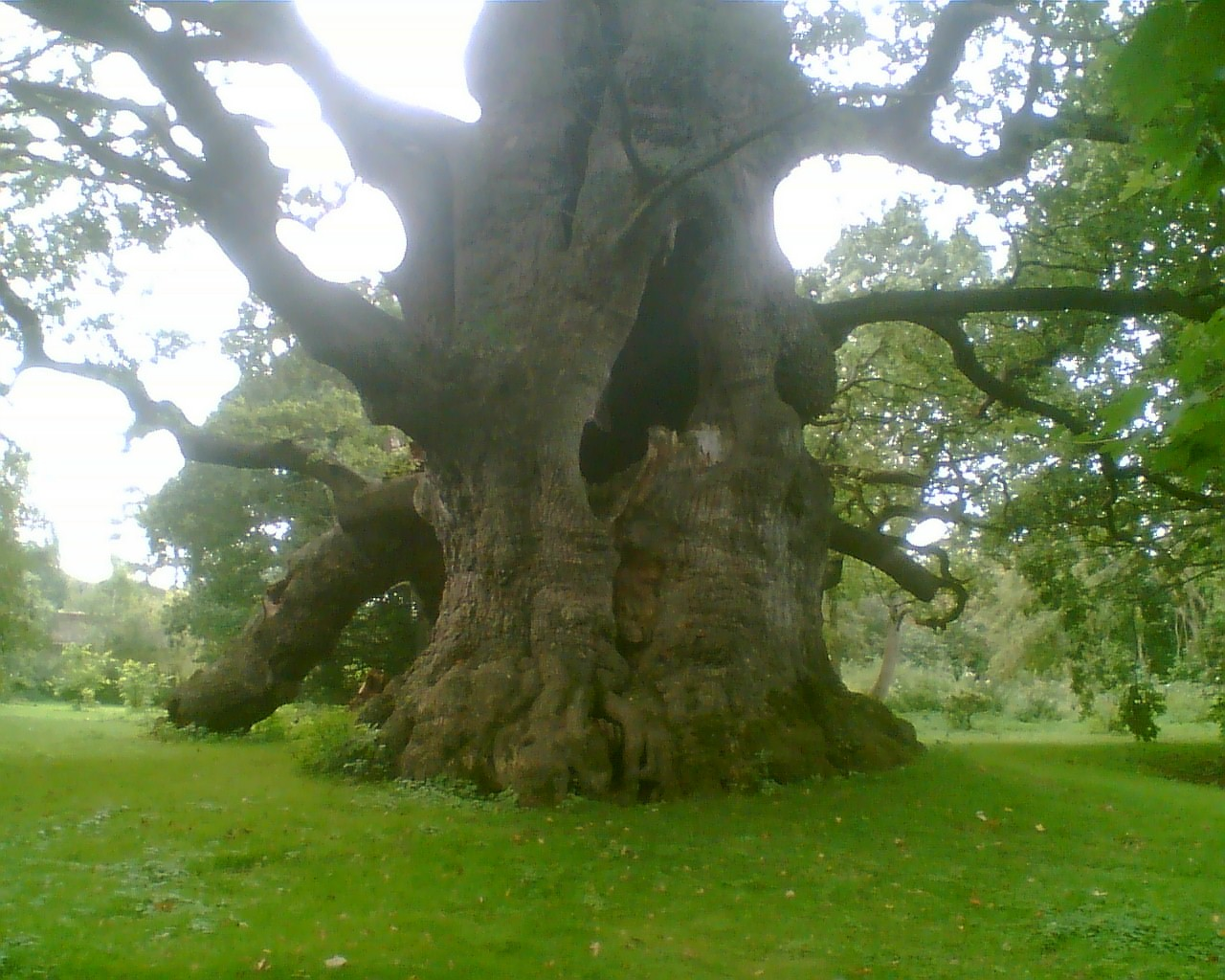
"Majesty" Oak in Fredville Park

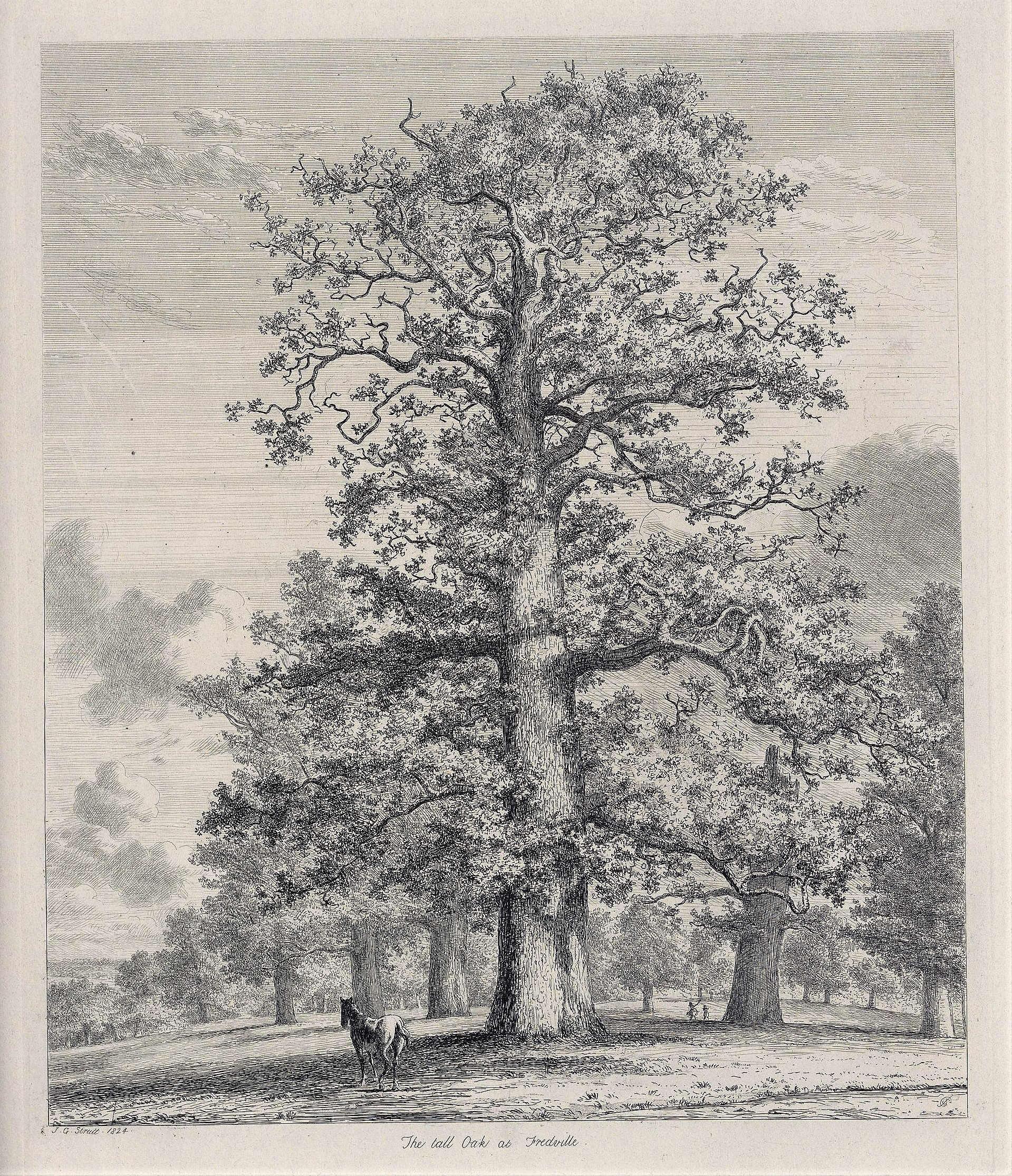
"Stately" - the Tall Oak at Fredville

The parkland has been known for its trees since the early 19th century. Thomas Walford in The Scientific Tourist through England, Wales, & Scotland mentioned three "magnificent" oak trees at Fredville named "Majesty", "Stately" and "Beauty". Jacob Strut in Sylva Britannica, or, Portraits of forest trees distinguished for their antiquity, magnitude, or beauty included a plate of Majesty and gave its circumference as 28 feet at eight feet off the ground. Strut described Stately as being of "singularly noble aspect", with its straight 70 foot high trunk. He wrote the three oaks were ". . . a group, which, for magnificence and beauty, is not perhaps exceeded by any other of the same nature; awakening in the mind of the spectator, the most agreeable associations of the freedom and grandeur of woodland scenery, with the security and refinements of cultivated life". The Dover Express in 1901 commented "for gracefulness nothing can exceed the fine specimens of Spanish chestnut trees" and the spread of a "magnificent Horn Bean tree . . . would cover a troop of soldiers". Thomas Pakenham visiting Fredville in 1994 stated the main trunk of the Majesty oak was hollow for 30 feet.

== Amenities ==
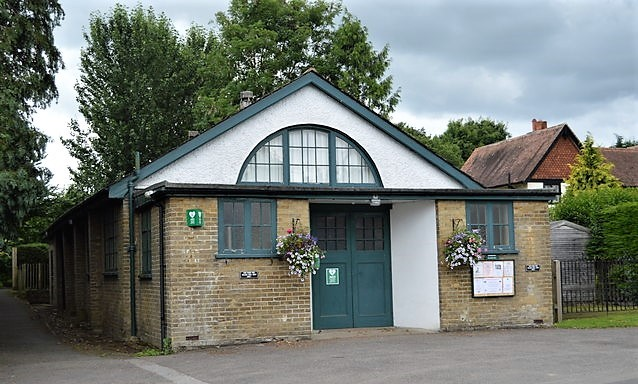
Nonington Village Hall

Nonington Village Hall opened in December 1923 with a Christmas fair and market following fifteen months of fundraising.

Schooling was provided in the north aisle of Nonington parish church until a school was built in 1820. It was enlarged in 1861. The school has a number of historical artefacts that have been retained since this period including the school log book. Nonington CE Primary School is federated with Goodnestone Primary school. There is a large tree in the centre of the playground supposedly planted by a pupil at the school.

Nonington Baptist Chapel opened on 3 May 1911. It is linked to Eythorne Baptist Church.

Nonington was noted in the Guinness Book of World Records for its 'Majesty Oak' in Fredville Park, the largest maiden oak tree in the UK.

The village is also on the Miner's Way Trail. The trail links up the coalfield parishes of East Kent.

=== Public transport ===
Snowdown railway station is just outside the western boundary of the parish. Trains run to Dover and London Victoria via Canterbury and Chatham.

== Conservation areas ==
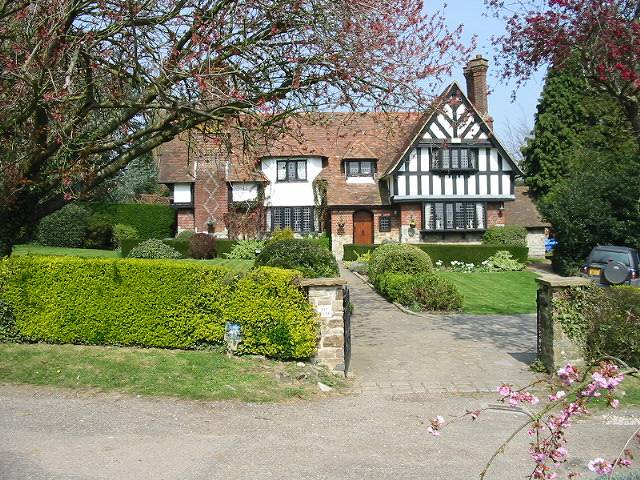
Red Tiles, Beauchamps Lane

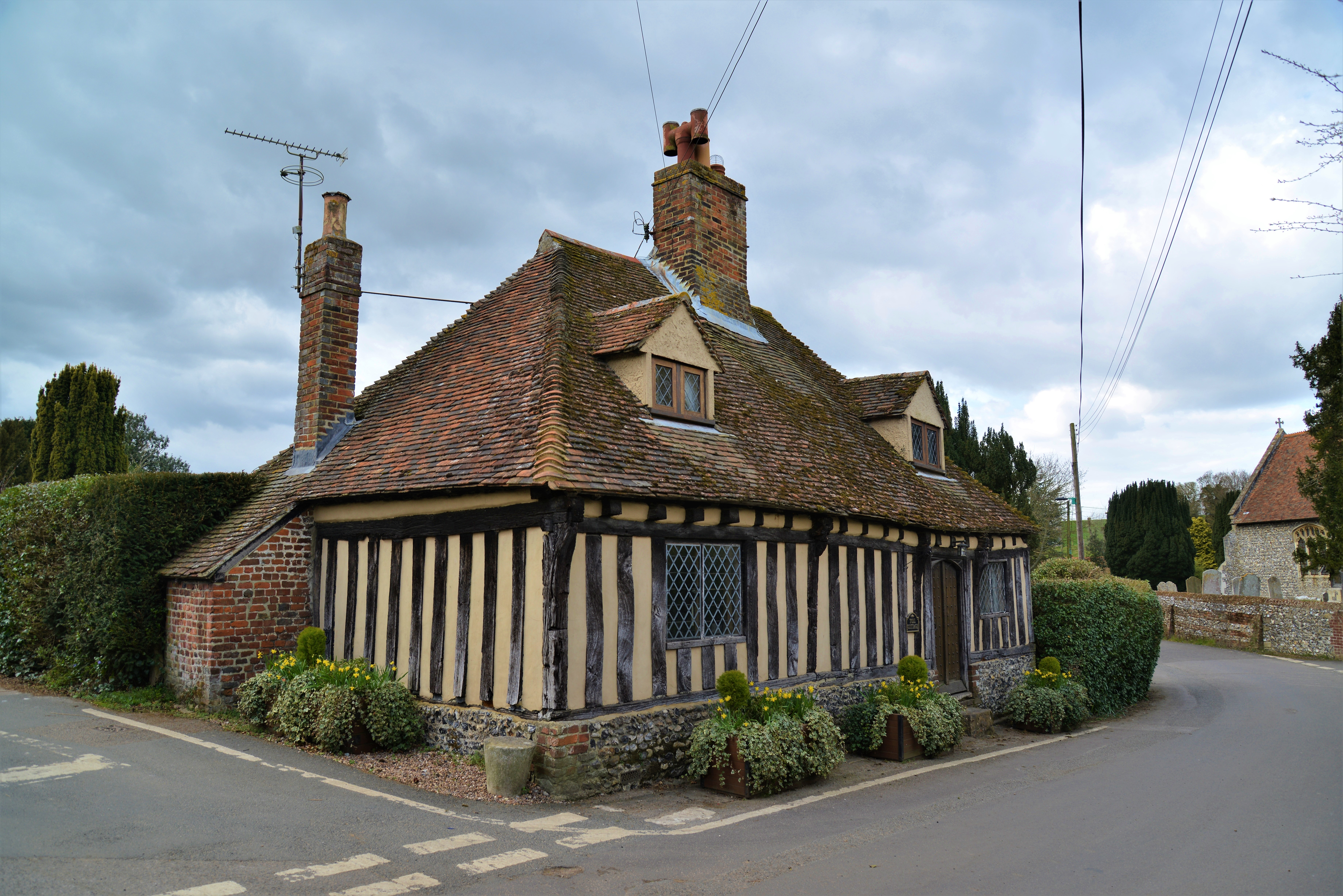
Toll Cottage, Vicarage Lane

The parish has three conservation areas: Nonington, Church Street and Nonington, Easole Street were both designated in 1973 and Frogham in 1989. As of August 2023 there are more than fifty listed buildings/structures in the parish of Nonington.

=== Easole Street ===
The Old Malthouse on Sandwich Road, dated 1704, is of brick and rendered timber frame construction under a hipped, thatched roof. A feature is the thatched hoist housing roof. Adjoining the original building are early 19th century extensions of brick under tiled and pantiled roofs. At the junction with Mill Lane stands the early 19th century, Lime Tree Cottage with weather boarded side elevations and a front facade of imitation ashlar masonry. In Mill Lane are a pair of gabled cottages by architect, George Devey for William Oxenden Hammond. Tall Chimneys and Bramley Cottage were built in 1878–9 of stone and red brick with blue diaper pattern; roughcast upper and exposed timber to front gable. In the same style is Red Tiles on Beauchamps Lane, now converted to a single dwelling. Southdown Cottage dates from the 13th century and merits a Grade II* listing. It is in the form of a hall house and is of plaster panel and timber frame construction with a thatched roof.

=== Vicarage Lane ===
In Vicarage Lane stands Toll Cottage which dates back to the 15th century or earlier. Its timber frame is infilled with plaster and set on a flint and brick base.
