= Dave Carr (footballer, born 1957) =

English footballer

Personal information
- Date of birth: 31 January 1957
- Place of birth: Aylesham, England
- Date of death: 19 June 2005 (aged 48)
- Positions: Defender; midfielder

Senior career*
| Years | Team | Apps | (Gls) |
| 1972–1973 | Margate | | |
| 1976–1979 | Luton Town | 43 | (0) |
| 1979–1983 | Lincoln City | 168 | (4) |
| 1983–1984 | Torquay United | 34 | (0) |
| 1984–1985 | Maidstone United | 33 | |
| 1985 | → Dover Athletic (loan) | | |
| 1985 | → Folkestone Invicta (loan) | | |
| 1985–1987 | Dover Athletic | | |
| 1987–1988 | Thanet United | 52 | (5) |
| 1988–1990 | Hythe Town | | |
| 1990–1992 | Sittingbourne | | |
| 1992 | Hythe Town | | |
| 1992 | Margate | | |

Managerial career
- 1998-1990: Hythe Town
- * Club domestic league appearances and goals

David Carr (31 January 1957 – 19 June 2005) was an English professional footballer. He played in both defence and midfield for a number of English professional and semi-professional sides.

Carr, born in Aylesham, Kent, began his senior football career with Margate, making his debut aged 15 in a Kent Floodlight Cup game at Hastings United. He joined Luton Town as an apprentice in January 1973 (Luton paying Margate £2000 as a transfer fee) and turned professional in January 1975. After 43 games, all in Division Two he joined Colin Murphy's Lincoln City for £20,500 in July 1979. Over the next three seasons he missed only one game and helped Lincoln to promotion from Division Four.

In August 1983 he moved to Torquay United, managed by Bruce Rioch, on a free transfer. He played 40 games that season before being released by new Torquay manager David Webb.

After his release he joined Maidstone United, later playing for Dover Athletic, and Folkestone Invicta before joining Thanet United in the 1987 close-season. In July 1988 he moved to Hythe Town as player-coach, taking over as player-manager in November 1989. He later played for Sittingbourne before finishing his career back at Margate in the 1992–93 season.

Carr died from cancer in June 2005, at the age of 48.

== Honours ==
Lincoln City

- Football League Group Cup runner-up: 1982–83
