= 1998–99 Arsenal L.F.C. season =

English women's football club season

Arsenal Ladies
1998–99 season
- Chairman: Peter Hill-Wood
- Manager: Vic Akers
- Stadium: Meadow Park
- Premier League: Second Place
- FA Cup: Winners
- Premier League Cup: Winners
- Challenge Trophy: Winners
- London County Cup: Runners Up
- Biggest win: 11–0 (vs Chelsea (A), FA Cup, 10 January 1999)
- Biggest defeat: 0–1 (vs Tranmere Rovers (A), Premier League, 18 October 1998); 0–1 (vs Millwall Lionesses (N), London County Cup, 21 March 1999)
Home colours	Away colours

The 1998–99 season was Arsenal Ladies Football Club's 12th season since forming in 1987. The club participated in the National Division of the FA Women's Premier League, finishing in second place. They won the Premier League Cup and the FA Cup, but lost to Millwall in the London County Cup Final. They also played Everton at Wembley for the Challenge Trophy, a precursor to the Charity Shield, winning 4–2 on penalties after a 1–1 draw.

Following Terry Howard's departure, Vic Akers returned to take charge of the team ahead of the new season. Arsenal also moved away from their home at Hayes Lane, and relocated to Meadow Park.

== Squad information & statistics ==
=== First team squad ===
Name	Date of Birth (Age)	Since	Signed From
Goalkeepers
(England) Sarah Reed	12 May 1980 (aged 19)	1996	(England) Wembley
(England) Abbie Yeoman	11 September 1982 (aged 16)	1998	(England) Clapton
(England) Lesley Higgs	25 October 1965 (aged 33)	1997	(England) Wembley
(England) Jasmine Cripps	4 November 1985 (aged 13)	1998	(England) Arsenal Academy
Carol Scrilloff		1998	
Defenders
(England) Kirsty Pealling	14 April 1975 (aged 24)	1987	(England) Arsenal Academy
(England) Faye White	2 February 1978 (aged 21)	1996	(England) Three Bridges
(England) Clare Wheatley	4 February 1971 (aged 28)	1995	(England) Chelsea
(England) Carol Harwood	1 December 1965 (aged 33)	1997	(England) Wembley
(England) Kim Jerray-Silver	6 October 1977 (aged 21)	1996	(England) Wembley
(England) Jenny Canty	22 March 1976 (aged 23)	1991	(England) Limehouse
(England) Vicki Slee	9 March 1973 (aged 26)	1991	(England) Millwall Lionesses
(England) Kelley Few	17 October 1971 (aged 27)	1991	(England) Romford
(Republic of Ireland) Tammy Scrivens	11 August 1978 (aged 20)	1997	(England) Mill Hill United
(United States) Felicity Smith		1998	(United States) Mary Washington Eagles
Midfielders
(England) Sian Williams (c)	2 February 1968 (aged 31)	1990	(England) Millwall Lionesses
(Republic of Ireland) Ciara Grant	17 May 1978 (aged 21)	1998	(Republic of Ireland) St Patrick's Athletic
(England) Tina Mapes	21 January 1971 (aged 28)	1997	(England) Croydon
(England) Emma Coss	9 May 1979 (aged 20)	1992	(England) Arsenal Academy
(Australia) Taryn Rockall	11 November 1977 (aged 21)	1998	(Australia) NSWIS
(England) Tina Mapes	21 January 1971 (aged 28)	1997	(England) Croydon
(Republic of Ireland) Carol Conlon	9 January 1979 (aged 20)	1998	(Republic of Ireland) St Patrick's Athletic
(England) Linda Watt	19 May 1973 (aged 26)	1995	(England) Watford
(England) Beth Lovell	12 January 1980 (aged 19)	1995	(England) Arsenal Academy
(Romania) Maria Ward	13 February 1975 (aged 24)	1997	(England) Arsenal Academy
Forwards
(England) Marieanne Spacey	13 February 1966 (aged 33)	1993	(England) Wimbledon
(England) Rachel Yankey	1 December 1979 (aged 19)	1996	(England) Mill Hill United
(England) Natasha Daly	29 March 1979 (aged 20)	1996	(England) Mill Hill United
(England) Ellen Maggs	16 February 1983 (aged 16)	1997	(England) Arsenal Academy
(England) Justine Lorton	11 March 1974 (aged 25)	1998	(England) Millwall Lionesses
(England) Nina Downham	31 December 1980 (aged 18)	1998	(England) Millwall Lionesses
(England) Sheuneen Ta	21 July 1985 (aged 13)	1997	(England) Arsenal Academy
(England) Kelly Smith ‡	29 October 1978 (aged 18)	1998	(United States) Seton Hall Pirates

‡ = Guested with Arsenal to play in the FA Women's Challenge Trophy.

=== Appearances and goals ===
Name	PLND		FA Cup		PL Cup		LC Cup		Challenge Trophy		Total	
Name	Apps	Goals	Apps	Goals	Apps	Goals	Apps	Goals	Apps	Goals	Apps	Goals
Goalkeepers
(England) Sarah Reed	17	0	5	0	4	0	2	0	1	0	29	0
(England) Abbie Yeoman	1	0	0	0	0	0	0	0	0	0	1	0
(England) Lesley Higgs	0	0	0	0	0	0	0	0	0	0	0	0
(England) Jasmine Cripps	0	0	0	0	0	0	0	0	0	0	0	0
Carol Scrilloff	0	0	0	0	0	0	0	0	0	0	0	0
Defenders
(England) Kirsty Pealling	17	1	4	0	4	0	1	0	0	0	26	1
(England) Faye White	16	5	5	0	4	2	2	1	1	0	28	8
(England) Clare Wheatley	10+8	3	5	1	4	0	2	1	0	0+1	21+9	5
(England) Carol Harwood	13+1	0	2	0	2	0	1	0	1	0	19+1	0
(England) Kim Jerray-Silver	9+5	0	0+3	0	0+1	0	1	0	1	0	11+9	0
(England) Jenny Canty	0	0	0	0	0	0	0	0	0	0	0	0
(England) Vicki Slee	14	0	5	0	3	0	2	0	1	0	25	0
(England) Kelley Few	10+5	2	3	2	3	1	1+1	0	1	0	18+6	5
(England) Beth Lovell	0	0	0	0	0	0	0	0	0	0	0	0
(Republic of Ireland) Tammy Scrivens	1+1	0	0	0	0	0	0	0	0	0	1+1	0
(United States) Felicity Smith	0	0	0	0	0	0	0	0	0	0	0	0
Midfielders
(England) Sian Williams (c)	17	0	5	1	4	0	0+1	1	1	0	27+1	2
(Republic of Ireland) Ciara Grant	17+1	4	5	1	4	3	2	1	1	0	29+1	9
(England) Tina Mapes	0+3	0	0	0	0	0	0	0	0	0	1+3	0
(England) Emma Coss	0	0	0	0	0	0	0	0	0	0	0	0
(Australia) Taryn Rockall	1+3	1	1+1	0	0+1	0	0+1	0	0	0	2+6	1
(England) Tina Mapes	0+1	0	0+1	0	0	0	1	0	0	0	0+2	0
(Republic of Ireland) Carol Conlon	0+3	0	0+3	0	0	0	2	0	0	0	2+6	0
(England) Linda Watt	0	0	0	0	0	0	0	0	0	0	0	0
Forwards
(England) Marieanne Spacey	17+1	17	5	8	4	8	2	0	1	0	29+1	33
(England) Rachel Yankey	18	13	4	4	4	3	0+2	0	1	0	27+2	20
(England) Natasha Daly	2+5	2	0+1	0	0+1	0	0	0	0	0	2+7	2
(England) Justine Lorton	17	9	5	3	4	0	1	0	0	0	27	12
(England) Nina Downham	1+6	2	1+1	0	0+1	0	2	1	0	0	4+8	3
(England) Sheuneen Ta	0	0	0	0	0	0	0	0	0	0	0	0
(England) Kelly Smith ‡	0	0	0	0	0	0	0	0	1	1	1	1

‡ = Guested with Arsenal to play in the FA Women's Challenge Trophy.

=== Goalscorers ===
Rank	Position	Name	PLND	FA Cup	PL Cup	LC Cup	Challenge Trophy	Total
1	FW	(England) Marieanne Spacey	17	8	8	0	0	33
2	FW	(England) Rachel Yankey	13	4	3	0	0	20
3	FW	(England) Justine Lorton	9	3	0	0	0	12
4	MF	(Republic of Ireland) Ciara Grant	4	1	3	1	0	9
5	DF	(England) Faye White	5	0	2	1	0	8
6	DF	(England) Clare Wheatley	3	1	0	1	0	5
6	DF	(England) Kelley Few	2	2	1	0	0	5
8	FW	(England) Nina Downham	2	0	0	1	0	3
9	FW	(England) Natasha Daly	2	0	0	0	0	2
9	MF	(England) Sian Williams	0	1	0	1	0	2
11	MF	(England) Kelly Smith ‡	0	0	0	0	1	1
11	DF	(England) Kirsty Pealling	1	0	0	0	0	1
11	MF	(Australia) Taryn Rockall	1	0	0	0	0	1
Own goal			0	1	0	0	0	1
Total			59	21	17	5	1	103

‡ = Guested with Arsenal to play in the FA Women's Challenge Trophy.

=== Clean sheets ===
Rank	Name	PLND	FA Cup	PL Cup	LC Cup	Challenge Trophy	Total
1	(England) Sarah Reed	8	4	2	0	0	14
2	(England) Lesley Higgs	0	0	0	0	0	0
2	(England) Jasmine Cripps	0	0	0	0	0	0
2	(England) Abbie Yeoman	0	0	0	0	0	0
Total		8	4	2	0	0	14

== Transfers, loans and other signings ==
=== Transfers in ===
Announcement date	Position	Player	From club
8 August 1998	FW	(England) Kelly Smith	(United States) Seton Hall Pirates
17 August 1998	FW	(England) Justine Lorton	(England) Millwall Lionesses
17 August 1998	MF	(Australia) Taryn Rockall	(Australia) NSWIS
17 August 1998	DF	(United States) Felicity Smith	(United States) Mary Washington Eagles
1998	MF	(Republic of Ireland) Ciara Grant	(Republic of Ireland) St Patrick's Athletic
1998	MF	(Republic of Ireland) Carol Conlon	(Republic of Ireland) St Patrick's Athletic
1998	GK	(England) Abbie Yeoman	(England) Clapton
1998	GK	Carol Scrilloff	

=== Transfers out ===
Announcement date	Position	Player	To club
17 August 1998	FW	(England) Kelly Smith	(United States) Seton Hall Pirates
1998	GK	(Australia) Sara King	(England) Hampton
1998	DF	(England) Michelle Curley	Retired
1998	DF	(England) Jo Moruzzi	(England) Wimbledon
1998	FW	(England) Emma Hastings	(United States) Savannah College
1998	FW	(England) Pat Pile	Retired
1998	FW	(England) Yvette Rean	Sabbatical
1998	MF	Sam Fisher	
1998	DF	(England) Carly Cruickshank	
1998	FW	(United States) Kara Lee Reynolds	
1998	FW	(England) Liz Benham	
1998	MF	(New Zealand) Robyn Davies-Patrick	
1998	FW	(England) Emma Burke	

== Club ==
=== Kit ===
Supplier: Nike / Sponsor: JVC

Home	Away

== Competitions ==
=== Overall record ===
Competition	First match	Last match	Starting round	Final position	Record							
Competition	First match	Last match	Starting round	Final position	Pld	W	D	L	GF	GA	GD	Win %
FA Women's Premier League National Division	6 September 1998	9 May 1999	Matchday 1	2nd	18	13	4	1	59	15	+44	72.22
FA Women's Cup	10 January 1999	3 May 1999	Fourth round	Winners	5	5	0	0	21	1	+20	100.00
FA Women's Premier League Cup	29 November 1998	28 March 1999	Second round	Winners	4	4	0	0	17	2	+15	100.00
FA Women's Challenge Trophy	9 August 1998		Final	Winners	1	1	0	0	1	1	+0	100.00
London County Cup	21 February 1999	21 March 1999	Semi-finals	Runners-up	2	1	0	1	5	3	+2	50.00
Total					30	24	4	2	103	22	+81	80.00

Last updated: 22 May 2026
Source: FA WPL

=== FA Women's Challenge Trophy ===
9 August 1998 Final	Arsenal	1–1 (4–2 p)	Everton	Wembley
	Smith 9'	Report	Gore 12'	Stadium: Wembley
	Penalties
	Slee (penalty scored); White (penalty missed); Smith (penalty scored); Yankey (penalty scored); Spacey (penalty scored)		Burke (penalty missed); Easton (penalty scored); Jones (penalty scored); Mason (penalty missed)

=== FA Women's Premier League National Division ===
==== Partial league table ====
Pos	Team	Pld	W	D	L	GF	GA	GD	Pts
1	Croydon (C)	18	14	4	0	53	11	+42	46
2	Arsenal	18	13	4	1	59	15	+44	43
3	Doncaster Belles	18	9	6	3	32	19	+13	33
4	Everton	18	10	2	6	30	20	+10	32
5	Tranmere Rovers	18	8	3	7	29	32	−3	27

Source: FA WPL
(C) Champions

==== Results summary ====
Overall								Home						Away					
Pld	W	D	L	GF	GA	GD	Pts	W	D	L	GF	GA	GD	W	D	L	GF	GA	GD
18	13	4	1	59	15	+44	43	7	2	0	29	8	+21	6	2	1	30	7	+23

==== Results by matchday ====
Matchday	1	2	3	4	5	6	7	8	9	10	11	12	13	14	15	16	17	18
Ground	A	H	A	A	H	H	A	A	H	A	H	A	A	H	A	H	H	H
Result	W	W	W	L	D	W	D	W	W	D	W	W	W	D	W	W	W	W
Position	1	1	1	1	2	2	1	1	1	1	1	1	1	1	1	1	2	2

Source: FA WPL
W = Win; D = Draw; L = Loss

==== Matches ====
6 September 1998 1	Bradford City	0–3	Arsenal	Guiseley
14:00 BST		Report	Yankey 4', 84'; Spacey 44'	Stadium: Nethermoor Park

20 September 1998 2	Arsenal	4–1	Everton	Borehamwood
14:00 BST	Daly 38'; White 50'; Spacey (pen.) 82'	Report	Jones	Stadium: Meadow Park

27 September 1998 3	Arsenal	3–3	Croydon	Borehamwood
14:00 BST	Yankey 1'; Pealling 25'; Lorton 42'	Report	C. Walker 30', 52'; Broadhurst 83'	Stadium: Meadow Park; Referee: C. Macnish

4 October 1998 4	Ilkeston Town	0–9	Arsenal	Ilkeston
14:00 BST		Report	Yankey 2', 37'; Lorton; Spacey 12' 87'; Wheatley	Stadium: New Manor Ground

18 October 1998 5	Tranmere Rovers	1–0	Arsenal	Heswall
14:00 BST	Shimmin 72'	Report		Stadium: Gayton Park; Attendance: 300

22 October 1998 6	Arsenal	1–0	Millwall Lionesses	Northwood
19:45 BST	Spacey 25'	Report		Stadium: Skyline Roofing Stadium; Referee: Mr Macvicar

1 November 1998 7	Everton	2–2	Arsenal	Crosby
12:30 GMT	Easton 35', 82'	Report	Yankey 55'; Lorton	Stadium: Rossett Park; Referee: S. Catterall

15 November 1998 8	Liverpool	0–5	Arsenal	Fairfield
12:00 GMT		Report	Spacey 18'; Few; Downham; Yankey; Grant	Stadium: Fairfield Police Ground

22 November 1998 9	Arsenal	2–1	Southampton Saints	Potters Bar
12:00 GMT	Spacey 62'; Yankey 75'	Report	Stainer 85'	Stadium: The Lantern Stadium; Referee: Mr Bowden

6 December 1998 10	Croydon	2–2	Arsenal	Croydon
15:00 GMT	Davis 68' (pen.); G. Hunt 70'	Report	Yankey 11'; Lorton 50'	Stadium: Croydon Sports Arena

13 December 1998 11	Arsenal	2–0	Liverpool	Borehamwood
14:00 GMT	Grant 55', 80'	Report		Stadium: Meadow Park; Referee: Mr Butterworth

20 December 1998 12	Millwall Lionesses	0–1	Arsenal	New Cross
14:00 GMT		Report	Daly 68'	Stadium: The Den; Referee: Mr N. Copperwheat

17 January 1999 13	Doncaster Belles	1–3	Arsenal	Armthorpe
14:00 GMT	Exley 39'	Report	Spacey 25'; Lorton 68'; Yankey 83'	Stadium: Welfare Ground

14 February 1999 14	Arsenal	2–2	Doncaster Belles	Potters Bar
14:00	Slee (yellow card) 7' (yellow-red card) 7'; Few 25'; Lorton 44'	Report	K. Walker 7' (pen.); Exley 55'	Stadium: The Lantern Stadium; Referee: Mr. Jones

14 March 1999 15	Southampton Saints	1–5	Arsenal	Eastleigh
14:00 GMT	50'	Report	White 25'; Spacey; Yankey 54'; Wheatley; Grant	Stadium: Stoneham Park

11 April 1999 16	Arsenal	6–0	Bradford City	Borehamwood
14:00 BST	Spacey; White; Rockall	Report		Stadium: Meadow Park; Referee: Mr I. Butterworth

25 April 1999 17	Arsenal	6–0	Ilkeston Town	Borehamwood
14:00 BST	Lorton 14'; Spacey 28'; Yankey; White; Wheatley	Report		Stadium: Meadow Park; Referee: Mr Turner

9 May 1999 18	Arsenal	3–1	Tranmere Rovers	Highbury
14:00 BST	Lorton 25'; Yankey; Downham	Report	Davies 47'	Stadium: Highbury

=== FA Women's Cup ===
10 January 1999 Fourth round	Chelsea	0–11	Arsenal	Beaconsfield
		Report	Yankey; Lorton; Few; Spacey (pen.); Williams	Stadium: Holloways Park

7 February 1999 Fifth round	Arsenal	1–0	Everton	Borehamwood
14:00 GMT	Spacey 75'	Report		Stadium: Meadow Park; Referee: Mr Hamilton

7 March 1999 Quarter-finals	Watford	1–5	Arsenal	Rickmansworth
14:00 GMT	Ray	Report	Spacey 9'; Grant 30'	Stadium: Durrants Sports Ground; Referee: C.J. Hills

4 April 1999 Semi-finals	Arsenal	2–0	Doncaster Belles	Worksop
	Yankey	Report		Stadium: Sandy Lane; Attendance: 750

3 May 1999 Final	Arsenal	2–0	Southampton Saints	Charlton
14:30 BST	Hayes 14' (o.g.); Wheatley 40'	Report		Stadium: The Valley; Attendance: 6,450; Referee: Wendy Toms

=== FA Women's Premier League Cup ===
29 November 1998 Second round	Arsenal	9–0	Wolverhampton Wanderers	Potters Bar
	Yankey 18', 43'; Few 24'; Spacey 30', 37' (pen.), 60', 84'; Grant 33'; White	Report		Stadium: The Lantern Stadium; Referee: Mr Gee

24 January 1999 Quarter-finals	Arsenal	1–0	Croydon	Borehamwood
14:00 GMT	Spacey 67'	Report		Stadium: Meadow Park

31 January 1999 Semi-finals	Whitehawk	1–4	Arsenal	Whitehawk
14:00 GMT	Banks 3'	Report	Spacey; Grant; White	Stadium: East Brighton Park; Attendance: 200; Referee: C. Taylor (Hants)

28 March 1999 Final	Everton	1–3	Arsenal	Prenton
14:30 GMT	Mason 10'	Report	Grant 20'; Yankey 74'; Spacey 90+2'	Stadium: Prenton Park; Attendance: 3,074; Referee: A. Page (Derbyshire)

=== London County Cup ===
21 February 1999 Semi-finals	Arsenal	5–2	Leyton Orient	Potters Bar
	Downham 9'; White; Grant; Wheatley; Williams	Report	Goal	Stadium: The Lantern Stadium

21 March 1999 Final	Arsenal	0–1 (a.e.t.)	Millwall Lionesses	Barkingside
		Report	100'	Stadium: Oakside Stadium

== See also ==
- List of Arsenal W.F.C. seasons
- 1998–99 in English football
