= 1998–99 in English football =

Football in England
- Season: 1998–99

Men's football
- FA Premier League: Manchester United
- Division One: Sunderland
- Division Two: Fulham
- Division Three: Brentford
- Football Conference: Cheltenham Town
- FA Cup: Manchester United
- Football League Trophy: Wigan Athletic
- League Cup: Tottenham Hotspur
- Charity Shield: Arsenal

Women's football
- Premier League National Division: Croydon
- Premier League Northern Division: Aston Villa
- Premier League Southern Division: Reading Royals
- FA Women's Cup: Arsenal
- Premier League Cup: Arsenal

The 1998–99 season was the 119th season of competitive football in England.

== Overview ==
=== Premier League ===
Manchester United overcame close competition from Arsenal and Chelsea to win their fifth Premiership title in seven seasons. They went on to win the treble of the Premiership title, FA Cup and European Cup, an achievement which gained manager Alex Ferguson a knighthood.

Nottingham Forest went down to Division One just one season after winning promotion. They had started the season terribly after manager Dave Bassett was sacked and Dutch striker Pierre van Hooijdonk refused to play after a dispute with the club. Experienced Ron Atkinson was brought in on a temporary contract but could not stave off relegation. Joining Forest in the Premiership drop zone were Blackburn Rovers, who had been Premiership champions just four years earlier, and Charlton Athletic. Southampton avoided relegation on the last day of the season, and their survival also signalled the go-ahead for a new stadium which would be in use for the 2001–02 season.

=== Division One ===
Sunderland were crowned Division One champions with a record 105 points, having lost just three games all season. The two other promotion places were secured by two of the division's least fancied sides – runners-up Bradford City, back in the top division for the first time in 77 years, and playoff winners Watford, who thus won their second successive promotion during Graham Taylor's second spell as manager.

Bury, Oxford United and Bristol City occupied the three relegation places in Division One. Oxford's dismal season was mainly down to debts of million which were putting the club in real danger of closure and had also resulted in the suspension of construction of their new stadium near the Blackbird Leys estate.

=== Division Two ===
Kevin Keegan completed his spell as Fulham manager before taking the England job by guiding the Cottagers to the Division Two championship with 101 points. Following them up were runners-up Walsall and playoff winners Manchester City.

Going down were York City, Northampton Town, Lincoln City and Macclesfield Town. Narrowly avoiding the drop to Division Three were Oldham Athletic, who just five years earlier had been a Premiership side and FA Cup semi-finalists.

=== Division Three ===
Brentford, Cambridge United, Cardiff City and Scunthorpe United occupied the four promotion places in Division Three.

Carlisle United secured their league status with seconds to spare in their final game. They entered the game in bottom place, and with 90 minutes on the clock in their home game against Plymouth Argyle they were drawing 1–1 and needed a win to stay up. The referee then allowed four minutes of stoppage time and with just seconds to go, goalkeeper Jimmy Glass came upfield and scored from a rebounded corner to preserve his club's place in the league, which had been held since 1928. Scarborough, who had only joined the league in 1987, were relegated instead. Glass, 25, had been signed on loan from Swindon Town after the transfer deadline because an injury crisis had left Carlisle without a goalkeeper for the final few games of the season.

=== FA Cup ===
Manchester United beat Newcastle United 2–0 to secure their third double triumph in six seasons and completed the second part of their treble.

=== League Cup ===
Tottenham Hotspur, under the management of George Graham, won the League Cup by defeating Leicester City in the final. On the way they knocked out Manchester United, stopping Scotsman Alex Ferguson emulating his fellow countrymen Celtic's quadruple success of 1967.

== Individual awards and records ==
Tottenham's French midfielder David Ginola was voted PFA Players' Player of the Year and FWA Footballer of the Year after helping his club win the League Cup.

19-year-old Arsenal and France striker Nicolas Anelka was voted PFA Young Player of the Year.

David Seaman became the most successful goalkeeper in English league history after conceding just 17 league goals in a season with Arsenal.

== Successful managers ==
Alex Ferguson was knighted after guiding Manchester United to the treble of the Premiership title, FA Cup and European Cup.

George Graham gave Tottenham Hotspur their first successful season for almost a decade by guiding them to League Cup glory.

Peter Reid took Sunderland into the Premiership as Division One champions with 105 points.

Harry Redknapp guided West Ham United to fifth place in the Premiership to secure their first European qualification for nearly 20 years.

Paul Jewell ended Bradford City's 77-year wait for a return to the top division.

Graham Taylor took Watford into the Premiership as they won the Division One playoffs and secured their second successive promotion.

Kevin Keegan finished his spell as Fulham manager by guiding them to the Division Two title with 101 points, before quitting to concentrate on his role as England manager.

Ray Graydon pulled off a major surprise in his first season as Walsall manager by gaining promotion to Division One.

Steve Cotterill, 35, guided Cheltenham Town into the Football League as Conference champions.

Brian Laws took Scunthorpe United out of the league's basement division for the first time in more than a decade after they won the Division Three playoffs.

== Events ==
=== Ferguson knighted after United's treble ===
Manchester United completed the treble of the Premiership title, FA Cup and European Cup.

Part one of United's treble was completed when they beat Tottenham 2–1 on the last day of the season to ensure that Arsenal did not retain the Premiership title. A week later they completed the second part of the treble with a 2–0 victory over Newcastle United in the FA Cup final.

United's treble aspirations seemed to have been thwarted in the European Cup final at Barcelona's Nou Camp stadium, with Bayern Munich leading 1–0 at the end of normal time. Referee Pierluigi Collina allowed three minutes of stoppage time and within the first minute, substitute Teddy Sheringham forced an equaliser. Sheringham's goal looked to have forced extra time, but with the last kick of the game Ole Gunnar Solskjær scored a winner and United fans and players went wild.

On 12 June, Alex Ferguson received a knighthood in recognition for his services to football, making him the seventh knight of English football and the third knight to be associated with Manchester United after Matt Busby and Bobby Charlton.

=== Hoddle ousted ===
On 2 February, the FA terminated Glenn Hoddle's contract as England manager after he appeared in The Times and suggested that disabled people were being "punished for sins in previous lives". His comments had sparked outrage amongst disabled people to such an extent that the FA felt they had no option but to sack him.

The search began for his successor. A month later, former Newcastle manager Kevin Keegan agreed to take charge of the England team but stayed on as Fulham manager until the end of the season, guiding them to the Division Two title.

=== New arrivals in Premiership ===
A year after their playoff final defeat to Charlton Athletic in a penalty shoot-out, Peter Reid's Sunderland returned to the Premiership after winning the Division One championship with a record 105 points. Sunderland, who had moved into their new home, the Stadium of Light, two years earlier, had been widely tipped for promotion to the top flight.

Bradford City, led by manager Paul Jewell, had been outside the top division since 1922. Their only silverware had been an FA Cup triumph in 1911. But the inexperienced Jewell surprised many observers by putting together a Bradford side who cruised to second place in Division One and booked their place in the Premiership.

The third and final place in the Premiership went to playoff winners Watford, managed by Graham Taylor for the second time (he had previously been in charge from 1976 until 1987). Taylor had finally achieved some success the previous year in form of the Division Two championship, having endured a torrid time with England and then Wolves. Watford secured a second successive promotion by beating Bolton Wanderers 2–0 in the playoff final.

=== Glass's last gasp goal keeps Carlisle in league ===
Carlisle United went into the final game of the 1998–99 Division Three campaign knowing that they had to beat Plymouth Argyle to hang on to the Football League place they had held since 1928. In April, an injury crisis had forced Carlisle to bring in goalkeeper Jimmy Glass on loan from Swindon Town and the Football League gave permission for the transfer to go ahead despite the transfer deadline having already passed.

With 90 minutes on the clock for Carlisle's home fixture against Plymouth, the referee allowed four minutes of stoppage time. Ten seconds before the end of stoppage time, Jimmy Glass ran upfield after a corner was given and slammed the ball into the back of the net to keep Carlisle in the league and send Scarborough down to the Conference.

=== Blackburn go down ===
Blackburn Rovers, Premiership champions in 1995, were relegated from the Premiership in 1999 with a side which had lost almost all of its title winning players. Roy Hodgson had arrived as manager in 1997 and achieved UEFA Cup qualification in his first season as manager, only to be sacked the following November as Blackburn found themselves caught up in a relegation battle. Manchester United's successful assistant manager Brian Kidd was brought in as his successor. But Blackburn's relegation fight was finally lost after they drew 0–0 at home to Manchester United in the penultimate game of the season. Chairman Jack Walker was now faced with finding the funds to build a side that could win promotion back to the Premiership, 12 months after he handed an open cheque book to Roy Hodgson in hope of winning the league.

=== Cheltenham promoted ===
Cheltenham Town won the Conference with Steve Cotterill guiding the Robins to the Football League. They had won the FA Trophy the previous season but were beaten to promotion by Halifax Town. They replaced Scarborough.

== League tables ==
=== FA Premier League ===
The seventh season of the FA Premier League saw Manchester United finish champions for the fifth time, one point ahead of the previous season's champions Arsenal. United also ended Arsenal's defence of the FA Cup, going on to defeat Newcastle United in the final to become the first English team to win the league title and FA Cup double on three occasions, having already won the double in 1994 and 1996. They then went on to win the Champions League to become only the second English club to win three major trophies in the same season. This made them the first English club to win the Champions League in fifteen years, and manager Alex Ferguson was knighted.

Chelsea's revival continued with a third-place finish in the league, although they failed to add any more silverware to the three cups won in the previous two seasons. Following the loss of manager George Graham to Tottenham in the autumn, Leeds United finished fourth under their new manager David O'Leary. Fifth place went to West Ham United, who qualified for Europe for the first time in nearly twenty years. Aston Villa, who had topped the table for much of the first half of the season, could only finish sixth, while Liverpool's seventh-place finish was a disappointing start for new manager Gérard Houllier.

Tottenham Hotspur finished 11th under new manager George Graham but won the League Cup to end their eight-year wait for a major trophy and a place in Europe. They also reached the semi-finals of the FA Cup.

Newly promoted Nottingham Forest were relegated in bottom place, their third relegation in seven seasons prompting manager Ron Atkinson (only appointed in January) to announce his retirement from management. Blackburn Rovers, league champions just four years earlier, were the next team to go down; the appointment of long-serving Manchester United assistant Brian Kidd as manager appeared to have turned the corner after a terrible start to the season, but a failure to win any of their final eight matches saw them relegated. Newly promoted Charlton Athletic were the last side to lose their top flight status, going down on the final day of the season as Southampton survived.

Pos	Team	Pld	W	D	L	GF	GA	GD	Pts	Qualification or relegation
1	Manchester United (C)	38	22	13	3	80	37	+43	79	Qualification for the Champions League first group stage
2	Arsenal	38	22	12	4	59	17	+42	78	Qualification for the Champions League first group stage
3	Chelsea	38	20	15	3	57	30	+27	75	Qualification for the Champions League third qualifying round
4	Leeds United	38	18	13	7	62	34	+28	67	Qualification for the UEFA Cup first round
5	West Ham United	38	16	9	13	46	53	−7	57	Qualification for the Intertoto Cup third round
6	Aston Villa	38	15	10	13	51	46	+5	55	
7	Liverpool	38	15	9	14	68	49	+19	54	
8	Derby County	38	13	13	12	40	45	−5	52	
9	Middlesbrough	38	12	15	11	48	54	−6	51	
10	Leicester City	38	12	13	13	40	46	−6	49	
11	Tottenham Hotspur	38	11	14	13	47	50	−3	47	Qualification for the UEFA Cup first round (Note: Tottenham Hotspur qualified for the UEFA Cup as League Cup winners.)
12	Sheffield Wednesday	38	13	7	18	41	42	−1	46	
13	Newcastle United	38	11	13	14	48	54	−6	46	Qualification for the UEFA Cup first round (Note: As Manchester United qualified for the Champions League, their UEFA Cup place as FA Cup winners defaulted to Newcastle United, the runners-up.)
14	Everton	38	11	10	17	42	47	−5	43	
15	Coventry City	38	11	9	18	39	51	−12	42	
16	Wimbledon	38	10	12	16	40	63	−23	42	
17	Southampton	38	11	8	19	37	64	−27	41	
18	Charlton Athletic (R)	38	8	12	18	41	56	−15	36	Relegation to Football League First Division
19	Blackburn Rovers (R)	38	7	14	17	38	52	−14	35	Relegation to Football League First Division
20	Nottingham Forest (R)	38	7	9	22	35	69	−34	30	Relegation to Football League First Division

Source: Premier League
Rules for classification: 1) points; 2) goal difference; 3) number of goals scored.
(C) Champions; (R) Relegated
Notes:

Leading goalscorer: Jimmy Floyd Hasselbaink (Leeds), Michael Owen (Liverpool) and Dwight Yorke (Manchester United) – 18

=== Division One ===
After the play-off final disappointment of the previous year, Sunderland returned to the top-flight in record breaking fashion, earning 105 points, setting a new record under the three points for a win system. Bradford City, who had only narrowly avoided relegation in the previous two seasons, returned to the top-flight for the first time in over 75 years, as Paul Jewell enjoyed a highly successful first full season as manager. Watford beat out pre-season favourites Bolton Wanderers in the play-off final, earning them their second successive promotion and also earning manager Graham Taylor the joint record for most promotions earned by a single manager.

Wolverhampton Wanderers just missed out on the playoffs after the dismissal of Mark McGhee in November paved the way for his assistant Colin Lee to take over and oversee a strong run of form which lifted the side into the top half of the table to finish seventh. Steve Bruce began his managerial career by guiding Sheffield United to an 8th-place finish before succeeding Peter Jackson at Huddersfield Town. Mark Goldberg's dream of turning Crystal Palace into a major footballing force quickly turned into a nightmare as financial problems almost put the club out of business, with head coach Terry Venables quitting halfway through the season and Steve Coppell taking charge for the fourth time in fifteen years to steer Palace to 14th place.

Bristol City finished bottom and suffered immediate relegation back to Division Two, as the club's decision to replace promotion-winning manager John Ward with Benny Lennartsson just a few weeks into the season failed to pay off. Oxford United finished second bottom amid increasing financial turmoil, and Bury were relegated on the last day due to the League's usage of goals scored over goal difference to separate sides on the same number of points (Port Vale would otherwise have been relegated due to their considerably worse goal difference). Adding to Bury's frustration, goal difference was reinstated the following season.

Pos	Team	Pld	W	D	L	GF	GA	GD	Pts	Qualification or relegation
1	Sunderland (C, P)	46	31	12	3	91	28	+63	105	Promotion to the Premier League
2	Bradford City (P)	46	26	9	11	82	47	+35	87	Promotion to the Premier League
3	Ipswich Town	46	26	8	12	69	32	+37	86	Qualification for the First Division play-offs
4	Birmingham City	46	23	12	11	66	37	+29	81	Qualification for the First Division play-offs
5	Watford (O, P)	46	21	14	11	65	56	+9	77	Qualification for the First Division play-offs
6	Bolton Wanderers	46	20	16	10	78	59	+19	76	Qualification for the First Division play-offs
7	Wolverhampton Wanderers	46	19	16	11	64	43	+21	73	
8	Sheffield United	46	18	13	15	71	66	+5	67	
9	Norwich City	46	15	17	14	62	61	+1	62	
10	Huddersfield Town	46	15	16	15	62	71	−9	61	
11	Grimsby Town	46	17	10	19	40	52	−12	61	
12	West Bromwich Albion	46	16	11	19	69	76	−7	59	
13	Barnsley	46	14	17	15	59	56	+3	59	
14	Crystal Palace	46	14	16	16	58	71	−13	58	
15	Tranmere Rovers	46	12	20	14	63	61	+2	56	
16	Stockport County	46	12	17	17	49	60	−11	53	
17	Swindon Town	46	13	11	22	59	81	−22	50	
18	Crewe Alexandra	46	12	12	22	54	78	−24	48	
19	Portsmouth	46	11	14	21	57	73	−16	47	
20	Queens Park Rangers	46	12	11	23	52	61	−9	47	
21	Port Vale	46	13	8	25	45	75	−30	47	
22	Bury (R)	46	10	17	19	35	60	−25	47	Relegation to the Second Division
23	Oxford United (R)	46	10	14	22	48	71	−23	44	Relegation to the Second Division
24	Bristol City (R)	46	9	15	22	57	80	−23	42	Relegation to the Second Division

Rules for classification: 1) Points; 2) Goals scored; 3) Goal difference
(C) Champions; (O) Play-off winners; (P) Promoted; (R) Relegated

Leading goalscorer: Lee Hughes (West Bromwich Albion) – 31

=== Division Two ===
Despite manager Kevin Keegan juggling his job with the England manager's job for the second half of the season, Fulham won the Division Two title and earned their second promotion in three seasons, though Keegan departed after the season ended. Walsall proved the surprise package of the division and entered the second tier for only the third time in their history. Manchester City, who had suffered a spectacular fall from grace over the last few years, immediately won promotion during their first ever season at this level, defeating Gillingham in a dramatic play-off final.

Ambitious Reading could only manage an 11th-place finish in their first season at the impressive new Madejski Stadium, while Stoke City's early promise under Brian Little was short-lived and an 8th-place finish was not enough for even a playoff place. Stoke then turned to Gary Megson in their quest to get back into Division One.

This season proved a step too far for Macclesfield, who had been promoted from the Conference and Division Three in successive years, and they were relegated in bottom place. Lincoln City were unable to recover from a dreadful start to the season and occupied the second bottom spot, also returning to Division Three after just a year. Northampton Town suffered a massively disappointing season after finishing fourth the previous year, and were relegated in third-bottom place. York City cruelly went down on the last day, after experiencing a disastrous second half of the season and falling into the relegation zone with mere seconds remaining of their final match.

Oldham Athletic finished one place and point clear of the relegation zone and avoided a third relegation in six seasons.

Pos	Team	Pld	W	D	L	GF	GA	GD	Pts	Qualification or relegation
1	Fulham (C, P)	46	31	8	7	79	32	+47	101	Promotion to the First Division
2	Walsall (P)	46	26	9	11	63	47	+16	87	Promotion to the First Division
3	Manchester City (O, P)	46	22	16	8	69	33	+36	82	Qualification for the Second Division play-offs
4	Gillingham	46	22	14	10	75	44	+31	80	Qualification for the Second Division play-offs
5	Preston North End	46	22	13	11	78	50	+28	79	Qualification for the Second Division play-offs
6	Wigan Athletic	46	22	10	14	75	48	+27	76	Qualification for the Second Division play-offs
7	Bournemouth	46	21	13	12	63	41	+22	76	
8	Stoke City	46	21	6	19	59	63	−4	69	
9	Chesterfield	46	17	13	16	46	44	+2	64	
10	Millwall	46	17	11	18	52	59	−7	62	
11	Reading	46	16	13	17	54	63	−9	61	
12	Luton Town	46	16	10	20	51	60	−9	58	
13	Bristol Rovers	46	13	17	16	65	56	+9	56	
14	Blackpool	46	14	14	18	44	54	−10	56	
15	Burnley	46	13	16	17	54	73	−19	55	
16	Notts County	46	14	12	20	52	61	−9	54	
17	Wrexham	46	13	14	19	43	62	−19	53	
18	Colchester United	46	12	16	18	52	70	−18	52	
19	Wycombe Wanderers	46	13	12	21	52	58	−6	51	
20	Oldham Athletic	46	14	9	23	48	66	−18	51	
21	York City (R)	46	13	11	22	56	80	−24	50	Relegation to the Third Division
22	Northampton Town (R)	46	10	18	18	43	57	−14	48	Relegation to the Third Division
23	Lincoln City (R)	46	13	7	26	42	74	−32	46	Relegation to the Third Division
24	Macclesfield Town (R)	46	11	10	25	43	63	−20	43	Relegation to the Third Division

Rules for classification: 1) Points; 2) Goals scored; 3) Goal difference
(C) Champions; (O) Play-off winners; (P) Promoted; (R) Relegated

Leading goalscorer: Jamie Cureton (Bristol Rovers) – 25

=== Division Three ===
Brentford chairman Ron Noades' unorthodox decision to appoint himself as manager paid off in surprising fashion, and they won promotion back to Division Two as champions. Cambridge United had actually led the division for most of the season but suffered from drawing too many games in the final months of the season and thus had to settle for second place. Cardiff City took the final automatic promotion spot, as Frank Burrows brought immediate success to the club in his second spell as manager. Scunthorpe United won the play-offs, earning their first promotion since 1983, giving them football above the fourth tier for the first time at Glanford Park.

In one of the most dramatic ends to a season in recent memory, Scarborough were relegated to the Football Conference. They had been bottom for most of the second half of the season, but appeared to have turned the corner by earning two wins and a draw from their last three matches. Carlisle United, who had been below them prior to the final match of the season, earned a shock injury time winner through goalkeeper Jimmy Glass, saving their League status and sending Scarborough down.

Hull City were in the relegation battle up to the penultimate game of the season, soon after Southend United won their battle against a third successive relegation.

Pos	Team	Pld	W	D	L	GF	GA	GD	Pts	Promotion or relegation
1	Brentford (C, P)	46	26	7	13	79	56	+23	85	Promotion to the Second Division
2	Cambridge United (P)	46	23	12	11	78	48	+30	81	Promotion to the Second Division
3	Cardiff City (P)	46	22	14	10	60	39	+21	80	Promotion to the Second Division
4	Scunthorpe United (O, P)	46	22	8	16	69	58	+11	74	Qualification for the Third Division play-offs
5	Rotherham United	46	20	13	13	79	61	+18	73	Qualification for the Third Division play-offs
6	Leyton Orient	46	19	15	12	68	59	+9	72	Qualification for the Third Division play-offs
7	Swansea City	46	19	14	13	56	48	+8	71	Qualification for the Third Division play-offs
8	Mansfield Town	46	19	10	17	60	58	+2	67	
9	Peterborough United	46	18	12	16	72	56	+16	66	
10	Halifax Town	46	17	15	14	58	56	+2	66	
11	Darlington	46	18	11	17	69	58	+11	65	
12	Exeter City	46	17	12	17	47	50	−3	63	
13	Plymouth Argyle	46	17	10	19	58	54	+4	61	
14	Chester City	46	13	18	15	57	66	−9	57	
15	Shrewsbury Town	46	14	14	18	52	63	−11	56	
16	Barnet	46	14	13	19	54	71	−17	55	
17	Brighton & Hove Albion	46	16	7	23	49	66	−17	55	
18	Southend United	46	14	12	20	52	58	−6	54	
19	Rochdale	46	13	15	18	42	55	−13	54	
20	Torquay United	46	12	17	17	47	58	−11	53	
21	Hull City	46	14	11	21	44	62	−18	53	
22	Hartlepool United	46	13	12	21	52	65	−13	51	
23	Carlisle United	46	11	16	19	43	53	−10	49	
24	Scarborough (R)	46	14	6	26	50	77	−27	48	Relegation to Football Conference

Rules for classification: 1) Points; 2) Goals scored; 3) Goal difference
(C) Champions; (O) Play-off winners; (P) Promoted; (R) Relegated

Leading goalscorer: Marco Gabbiadini (Darlington) – 24

== Diary of the season ==
16 July 1998 – Former French national coach Gérard Houllier is appointed joint manager of Liverpool to work alongside Roy Evans. It is the first time in the club's 106-year history that two managers have been placed in charge of the first team.

19 July 1998 – Manchester United deny reports that they will be joining a proposed European Super League of up to 32 clubs.

3 August 1998 – Newcastle United pay £5.25million for Germany midfielder Dietmar Hamann from Bayern Munich.

9 August 1998 – Arsenal claim their third trophy of 1998 with a 3–0 win over Manchester United in the Charity Shield.

12 August 1998 – Newcastle United sign Nolberto Solano, the Peruvian midfielder, from Boca Juniors for £2.48million.

15 August 1998 – The Premier League season begins with champions Arsenal beating newly promoted Nottingham Forest 2–1 at Highbury. Chelsea begin with a surprise 2–1 defeat at Coventry City. Manchester United are held to a 2–2 home draw by Leicester City. Wimbledon take the lead of the Premier League on the opening day with a 3–1 home win over Tottenham Hotspur. Charlton Athletic mark their return to the elite by drawing 0–0 at Newcastle.

20 August 1998 – Manchester United pay a club record £12.6million for Aston Villa striker Dwight Yorke.

22 August 1998 – Charlton Athletic demolish Southampton 5–0 at The Valley. Tottenham's dismal start continued when they lose 3–0 at home to Sheffield Wednesday. Manchester United are held to a draw again, this time 0–0 against West Ham United at Upton Park. Newcastle United lose 4–1 at home to Liverpool.

27 August 1998 – Kenny Dalglish is sacked after 19 months as manager of Newcastle United.

31 August 1998 – Newcastle United appoint Ruud Gullit as their new manager, the day before his 36th birthday. The first month of the league season ends with newly promoted Charlton Athletic top of the Premier League, but the end-of-month table has little significance as only two games have been played so far. Sunderland head the race for a place in next season's Premier League as Division One leaders, with Wolverhampton Wanderers in second place. Hopes are high of a successful season for Midlands clubs as West Bromwich Albion are third and Birmingham City stand fourth. Norwich City, rebuilding under new manager Bruce Rioch occupy fifth, while the top six is completed by a Watford side who are searching for a second successive promotion. Just outside the playoff zone are Bury, whose excellent start to the season has sparked speculation that they might match Swansea City and Wimbledon's record of three promotions in four seasons.

6 September 1998 – Christian Gross is sacked after nine months as manager of Tottenham Hotspur.

8 September 1998 – Aston Villa pay Middlesbrough £6.75million for midfielder Paul Merson.

9 September 1998 – An inquest records a verdict of suicide on former Norwich City and Nottingham Forest striker Justin Fashanu, who was found hanged at a lock-up garage in London four months ago. Manchester United record a Premier League win at the fourth attempt by beating Charlton Athletic 4–1 at Old Trafford. Wimbledon continue their recent resurgence with a 4–3 win at West Ham. Manchester United accepts a £623.4million takeover bid from BSkyB.

12 September 1998 – Arsenal sign Swedish midfielder Freddie Ljungberg from Halmstad for £3million. Tottenham's dismal start to the season continues as they lose 3–0 at home to newly promoted Middlesbrough.

19 September 1998 – Newcastle United show signs of a return to their old form with a 5–1 away win over Coventry City. Newly promoted Charlton Athletic hold Liverpool to a 3–3 draw at Anfield.

20 September 1998 – Arsenal beat Manchester United 3–0 in the league at Highbury – the fourth defeat they have inflicted upon Alex Ferguson's team in less than a year.

23 September 1998 – Everton sign 22-year-old goalkeeper Steve Simonsen from Tranmere Rovers for £3.3million.

30 September 1998 – September ends with Aston Villa as Premier League leaders 5 points above second-placed Derby County are putting up a surprise title challenge after being predicted by many to struggle in the battle against relegation. Manchester United, Liverpool and Wimbledon complete the top five. Southampton prop up the top flight with one point from their opening six games, while Coventry City and Blackburn Rovers completing the relegation zone. Sunderland remain top of Division One, level on points with surprise promotion challengers Huddersfield Town. Bolton Wanderers, Watford, Birmingham City and Norwich City occupy the playoff places, while surprise promotion contenders Bury are keeping up the pressure on the top six.

1 October 1998 – George Graham quits Leeds United after two years as manager to take over at Tottenham Hotspur.

3 October 1998 – Middlesbrough's return to the top flight continues with a 4–0 home win over Sheffield Wednesday.

9 October 1998 – Everton sign Ivorian striker Ibrahima Bakayoko from Montpellier for £4.5million.

15 October 1998 – Steve Watson, Newcastle United's longest serving player (who joined the club on leaving school in 1990), is sold to Aston Villa for £4.5million.

25 October 1998 – Leicester City confirm that manager Martin O'Neill will not be moving to Leeds United. Caretaker David O'Leary, formerly assistant manager at Elland Road, gets the manager's job on a permanent basis.

28 October 1998 – Chelsea player-manager Gianluca Vialli scores a hat-trick in the 4–1 League Cup third round win over Aston Villa. Making his debut as a late substitute is 17-year-old defender John Terry. On the same day, striker Brian Laudrup's departure from Chelsea is announced after just four months at the club.

31 October 1998 – Ron Reeves, a 55-year-old steward, is killed outside Highfield Road stadium after being crushed by the Arsenal team coach just before a game with Coventry City. The month ends with Aston Villa still top, a point ahead of second placed Manchester United, while Arsenal are close behind in third place. A wide gap is beginning to open up between the top three and the rest of the division, with Liverpool, Middlesbrough, Chelsea, Leicester City and West Ham United putting up the nearest competition. Southampton, still only with one win to their name, occupy bottom place and are joined in the relegation zone by Coventry City and Nottingham Forest. Sunderland and Huddersfield Town continue to head the race for Premier League football, with the top six being completed by Birmingham City, Ipswich Town, Watford and Norwich City. Grimsby Town (eighth) have emerged as surprise contenders for a second successive promotion, but Bury's challenge is falling away and they now occupy 15th place. Wolverhampton Wanderers fare little better after their dismal start to the season, now occupying 12th place.

5 November 1998: Wolverhampton Wanderers sack manager Mark McGhee after three years at the helm.

12 November 1998 – Peter Schmeichel, goalkeeper of Manchester United since 1991, announces his intention to leave the club at the end of this season. Roy Evans resigns as joint manager of Liverpool after nearly five years in charge and more than 30 years on the club's payroll, leaving Gérard Houllier in sole charge.

14 November 1998 – Colchester United fall victim to arguably the biggest upset of the FA Cup fourth round when they are defeated 4–1 by non-league Bedlington Terriers. Other Football League clubs to be eliminated by non-league counterparts include Barnet, Southend United and Shrewsbury Town.

21 November 1998 – Blackburn Rovers lose 2–0 at home to Southampton, leaving them bottom of the Premier League with a mere nine points from their opening 14 games. Manager Roy Hodgson resigns within hours of the defeat. Long-serving coach Tony Parkes is put in charge of the first team on a temporary basis. On the same day, Manchester United suffer a shock 3–1 defeat at Sheffield Wednesday.

30 November 1998 – November draws to a close with Aston Villa still leading Manchester United by a single point, but a surprise title challenge is creeping upon them from a West Ham United side with no previous top division titles to their name, and who have not finished in the top five for more than a decade. Arsenal and Chelsea complete the top five. Blackburn Rovers now prop up the top flight, having started the season among the teams tipped by many to challenge for the title. Southampton and Nottingham Forest remain in the drop zone. Sunderland continue to lead Division One, their nearest threat coming from Ipswich Town. Watford, Birmingham City, Bolton Wanderers and Sheffield United complete the top six, with Wolverhampton Wanderers providing the closest competition for the top six after a rejuvenation under new manager Colin Lee.

4 December 1998 – Brian Kidd steps down as Manchester United assistant manager to succeed Roy Hodgson as manager of Blackburn Rovers.

5 December 1998 – Blackburn beat Charlton 1–0 in their first game under Brian Kidd at Ewood Park.

8 December 1998 – Five years after leaving them from Blackburn Rovers, David Batty returns to Leeds United in a £4.4 million move from Newcastle United.

16 December 1998 – Brian McClair, who was among the names linked with succeeding Brian Kidd as assistant manager at Manchester United, is appointed as Kidd's assistant at Blackburn.

19 December 1998 – Manchester United lost 3–2 at home to Middlesbrough – their first home defeat for nine months. United are managed by coach Jimmy Ryan, as Alex Ferguson misses the game on compassionate grounds following the death of his sister-in-law, and United have yet to find a permanent successor to Brian Kidd as assistant manager.

23 December 1998 – The Independent reports that up to ten Premier League clubs could break away to join a European Super League if the Premier League loses its forthcoming High Court case with the Office of Fair Trading. The case will see the Office of Fair Trading bring a case against the Football League, BSkyB and the BBC in the hope of ending collective bargaining for television deals by Premier League clubs.

26 December 1998 – The key drama on Boxing Day sees defender Ronny Johnsen score twice in Manchester United's 3–0 home win over Nottingham Forest,

30 December 1998 – French defender Didier Domi joins Newcastle United in a £4 million move from Paris Saint-Germain.

31 December 1998 – 1998 draws to a close with Aston Villa still leading the Premier League, but with Chelsea, Manchester United, Arsenal, Leeds United and West Ham United all posing a fairly close threat. Nottingham Forest, Southampton and Charlton Athletic occupy the bottom three places. Sunderland and Ipswich Town continue to lead the way in the race for a Premier League place, with the playoff zone being occupied by Birmingham City, Bolton Wanderers, Watford and an ever-improving Bradford City.

2 January 1999 – Last year's FA Cup runners-up Newcastle United win 2–1 at home to Crystal Palace in the third round. Leeds United are held to a goalless draw at Conference side Rushden & Diamonds.

3 January 1999 – Manchester United beat Middlesbrough 3–1 in the FA Cup third round at Old Trafford.

4 January 1999 – Arsenal begin their defence of the FA Cup by beating Preston North End 2–0 in the third round at Deepdale.

5 January 1999 – Nottingham Forest, bottom of the Premier League and winless for 17 games, sack manager Dave Bassett after less than two years in charge. Micky Adams, former Swansea City and Brentford manager, is placed in temporary charge of Forest.

8 January 1999 – 15-year-old Notts County schoolboy forward Jermaine Pennant signs for Arsenal's academy in a £2 million deal.

9 January 1999 – The first Premier League games of 1999 include Coventry City's 4–0 home win over Nottingham Forest – the 18th successive league game that the visitors have failed to win. Southampton beat fellow relegation strugglers Charlton Athletic 3–1 at The Dell.

11 January 1999 – Ron Atkinson is appointed manager of Nottingham Forest until the end of the season.

13 January 1999 – Leeds United avoid what would have been one of the biggest FA Cup upsets of modern times and beat Rushden and Diamonds 3–1 in the third round replay at Elland Road.

14 January 1999 – Wimbledon pay a club record £7.5 million for West Ham United striker John Hartson, who six months ago was a transfer target for Manchester United.

16 January 1999 – Two high scoring games in the Premier League sees Dwight Yorke and Robbie Fowler score hat tricks for their respective clubs as Manchester United thrash Leicester City 6–2 at Filbert Street, while Liverpool crush Southampton 7–1 at Anfield.

18 January 1999 – Bryan Kidd boosts his Blackburn Rovers side in their battle against relegation by signing Crystal Palace striker Matt Jansen for £4.1 million.

23 January 1999 – Aston Villa suffer a shock FA Cup exit at home to Division Two leaders Fulham in the fourth round.

24 January 1999 – Two late goals see Manchester United overturn Liverpool's 1–0 lead and win 2–1 in the fourth round tie at Old Trafford.

25 January 1999 – Cash-strapped Division One strugglers Oxford United hold Chelsea to an impressive 1–1 draw at the Manor Ground.

27 January 1999 – Two midfielders change clubs for £4 million – Marc-Vivien Foé from Lens to West Ham United and Jason McAteer from Liverpool to Blackburn Rovers.

28 January 1999 – Steve McManaman agrees to sign for Real Madrid from Liverpool at the end of the season.

30 January 1999 – Glenn Hoddle appears in an interview in The Sunday Times in which he suggests that disabled people are paying for their sins in a previous life. Nottingham Forest end their 19-match winless run in the league with a 1–0 away win over Everton.

31 January 1999 – January ends with Manchester United now top of the Premier League, but former leaders Aston Villa still only a point behind bracketed on points with Chelsea. Arsenal, meanwhile, have crept into the title frame and now stand fourth – just two points off the top. West Ham United's challenge has crumbled and they now stand ninth, with 11 points separating them from top spot. Nottingham Forest, meanwhile, have gone from bad to worse and now prop up the table. They are joined in the drop zone by Southampton and Charlton Athletic after Brian Kidd guided Blackburn Rovers out of the bottom three. Sunderland and Bradford City lead the way in Division One, with Bolton Wanderers, Ipswich Town, Watford and Birmingham City completing the top six. Grimsby Town are back in form and giving the top six a serious run for their money.

2 February 1999 – Glenn Hoddle is sacked as England manager two days after his controversial remarks.

3 February 1999 – Oxford United's luck in the FA Cup runs out: 17-year-old Mikael Forssell bags a brace on his first start for 4–2 victors Chelsea in the fourth round replay at Stamford Bridge.

4 February 1999 - Tim Sherwood signs for Tottenham Hotspur from Blackburn Rovers for £4 million, and Silvio Marić joins Newcastle United from Croatia Zagreb for $5.8 million.

5 February 1999 - Derby County assistant manager Steve McClaren is named as Manchester United's new assistant manager.

6 February 1999 – Manchester United record the highest ever away win in the Premier League by beating Nottingham Forest 8–1 at the City Ground. Substitute Ole Gunnar Solskjær scores four times.

28 February 1999 – February draws to a close with Manchester United now top of the Premier League four points, although nearest rivals Chelsea have a game in hand. Arsenal, Aston Villa and Leeds United complete the top five. Nottingham Forest remain bottom and are now ten points adrift of safety, while Southampton remain in the bottom three but Charlton Athletic have jumped clear at the expense of Blackburn Rovers. Sunderland are still top of Division One, their nearest competition coming from Bradford City and Ipswich Town who are level on points. Bolton Wanderers, Birmingham City and Watford complete the top six. Wolverhampton Wanderers, Grimsby Town and West Bromwich Albion continue to keep up the pressure in the push for a playoff place.

5 March 1999 – Former Doncaster Rovers chairman Ken Richardson is sentenced to four years in prison for paying a friend to start a fire at the club's Belle Vue ground in 1995. The arsonist, 41-year-old Alan Kristiansen, receives a one-year prison sentence, while two other men receive suspended sentences for their part in the fire, which caused £100,000 worth of damage.

7 March 1999 – Manchester United draw 0–0 with Chelsea in the FA Cup quarter-final at Old Trafford, with Paul Scholes being sent off for United and Roberto Di Matteo for Chelsea in a game which kicked off just hours after the death was announced of legendary former United striker Dennis Viollet from cancer at age 65.

10 March 1999 – Dwight Yorke keeps Manchester United in line for the treble as he scores both their goals in the 2–0 quarter-final replay win at Chelsea.

11 March 1999 – Aston Villa sign midfielder Steve Stone from Nottingham Forest for £5.5 million.

13 March 1999 – Nottingham Forest keep their faint survival hopes alive with a 3–1 away win over Wimbledon, only their third league win of the season.

16 March 1999 – Barnsley, the only non-Premier League team to reach the FA Cup quarter-finals, bow out at Oakwell when David Ginola scores the only goal of the game for Tottenham Hotspur, who remain in contention for a cup double.

17 March 1999 – The Monopolies and Mergers Commission vetoes BSkyB's takeover of Manchester United.

21 March 1999 – Tottenham Hotspur end their eight-year wait for a major trophy (and European qualification) thanks to a 1–0 win over Leicester City in the League Cup final.

22 March 1999 – Blackburn Rovers pay Derby County £3.4 million for midfielder Lee Carsley.

31 March 1999 – March ends with Manchester United still top of the Premier League by a four-point margin, with Arsenal and Chelsea as their nearest contenders. Leeds United, occupying fourth place, are still within a shout of the league title. West Ham United complete the top five, competing with most of the rest of the "safe" Premier League teams for a UEFA Cup place. Nottingham Forest's dreadful run of form has continued and they now need a miracle to escape relegation. Charlton Athletic and Southampton complete the bottom three. Sunderland are now 12 points ahead of their nearest rivals Ipswich Town at the top of Division One. Bradford City, Birmingham City and Bolton Wanderers remain in the playoff zone, where they are joined by a Wolverhampton Wanderers side whose form is continuing to improve.

3 April 1999 – Both league-leaders Manchester United and second-placed Arsenal drop points as they are both held, by Wimbledon and Southampton respectively. Elsewhere, Liverpool win the Merseyside derby 3–2, and Leeds United rack up their seventh win on the bounce–a club record–by beating Nottingham Forest.

11 April 1999 – Manchester United and Arsenal, competing head to head for both the Premier League title and the FA Cup, draw 0–0 at Villa Park in the FA Cup semi-final. In other semi-final, at Old Trafford, two goals in extra time from Alan Shearer send Newcastle United through to the final for the second year running and spell an end to Tottenham's hopes of a cup double.

14 April 1999 – One of the most thrilling games so far this season sees Manchester United beat Arsenal 2–1 in extra time in the FA Cup semi-final replay. United had taken the lead after 17th minutes thanks to David Beckham, only for Dennis Bergkamp to equalise after 69 minutes. Bergkamp could have won the game for Arsenal with just a minute remaining, but Peter Schmeichel saved his penalty shot and forced extra time, in which Ryan Giggs won it for United with a spectacular 109th-minute goal.

21 April 1999 – Manchester United reach their first European Cup final for 31 years – and only their second of all time – by recording a 4–3 aggregate win over Juventus. They won 3–2 in tonight's clash in Turin, having been 2–0 down at half-time. They drew 1–1 in the first leg at Old Trafford on 7 April.

23 April 1999 – UEFA rejects calls from English clubs for four, rather than three, Champions League qualification places to be available for next season's competition – this will only happen in the unlikely event of Manchester United winning the European Cup next month and finishing outside the top three of the Premier League.

24 April 1999 – Nottingham Forest's Premier League relegation is confirmed with a 2–0 defeat to Aston Villa, after which manager Ron Atkinson announces that he will retire at the end of this season.

30 April 1999 – April draws to a close with Arsenal now leading the Premier League, but Manchester United are a point behind with a game in hand. Chelsea and Leeds United remain in distant contention, while the final European place is being contested by Aston Villa, West Ham United, Middlesbrough, Derby County, Liverpool and Leicester City. Nottingham Forest's inevitable relegation has now been confirmed, with Southampton, Charlton Athletic, Blackburn Rovers, Coventry City, Everton and Sheffield Wednesday all in the battle of avoid going down as well. Sunderland are definitely in the Premier League next season, as champions of Division One. Bradford City and Ipswich Town are level on points in the race for second place, with Birmingham City now the only team who can catch either of them. Bolton Wanderers and Wolverhampton Wanderers complete the top six, but Watford are pushing hard for a playoff place.

6 May 1999 – Blackburn Rovers are relegated to Division One just four years after being Premier League champions.

8 May 1999 – On-loan goalkeeper Jimmy Glass scored an injury-time winner for Carlisle United on the final day of the season to save their Football League status, and relegate Scarborough to the Conference.

9 May 1999 – Sunderland's 2–1 win over Birmingham City on the final day of the Division One season has given them an English league record of 105 points this season. They will be joined in the elite next season by Bradford City, whose second-place finish has given them top flight football for the first time since 1922. Ipswich Town, Birmingham City, Watford and Bolton Wanderers will contest the playoffs. Meanwhile, Manchester United go back on top of the Premier League with a 1–0 win at Middlesbrough.

11 May 1999 – Arsenal lose their penultimate league game of the season 1–0 at Leeds United, losing their chance to go top of the Premier League – meaning that a win for Manchester United against Blackburn Rovers on Thursday will make it almost certain (regardless of final day results) that the league title will return to Old Trafford.

13 May 1999 – Manchester United are held to a goalless draw by former assistant manager Brian Kidd's Blackburn at Ewood Park – a result which confirms Blackburn's relegation (just four years after being champions) and allows the title destiny to remain firmly in United's hands.

16 May 1999 – Manchester United clinch their fifth Premier League title in seven seasons after beating Tottenham 2–1 at home on the final day of the season, rendering Arsenal's 1–0 home win over Aston Villa useless. Third placed Chelsea beat Derby County 2–1, while Leeds United end David O'Leary's first season in management in fourth place with a 2–2 draw at Coventry. West Ham's 4–0 home win over Middlesbrough secures them a fifth-place finish and a place in the 1999–2000 UEFA Cup, their highest finish for 13 years and their first European campaign in 19 years. The last relegation place goes to Charlton Athletic, who lose 1–0 at home to 12th placed Sheffield Wednesday, while Southampton confirm their survival with a 2–0 win over Everton.

18 May 1999 – Liverpool sign Finnish defender Sami Hyypiä from Dutch side Willem II for £3 million.

22 May 1999 – Manchester United complete a unique third 'double' of the league title and FA Cup with a 2–0 win over Newcastle United at Wembley. Teddy Sheringham opens the scoring in the 11th minute and Paul Scholes adds to United's tally in the 53rd minute. In four days' time, they will be competing in the European Cup final to challenge for a unique treble.

26 May 1999 – Two late goals (the equaliser from Teddy Sheringham and the winner from Ole Gunnar Solskjær) save Manchester United from the jaws of defeat and they beat Bayern Munich 2–1 in the Champions League final at the Camp Nou to complete a unique treble.

30 May 1999 – Two late goals save Manchester City from the jaws of defeat as they pull Gillingham back to 2–2 in the Division Two Play-off Final at Wembley. They go on to win 3–1 on penalties to attain their first promotion in ten years.

31 May 1999 – Watford seal promotion to the Premier League with a 2–0 win over Bolton Wanderers in the Division One playoff final at Wembley. They are first team since Notts County in 1991 to reach the top flight with two successive promotions.

12 June 1999 – Alex Ferguson receives a knighthood just over two weeks after guiding Manchester United to the treble.

== Women's football ==
=== Women's Premier League ===
==== National Division ====
Pos	Team	Pld	W	D	L	GF	GA	GD	Pts	Qualification or relegation
1	Croydon (C)	18	14	4	0	53	11	+42	46	
2	Arsenal	18	13	4	1	59	15	+44	43	
3	Doncaster Belles	18	9	6	3	32	19	+13	33	
4	Everton	18	10	2	6	30	20	+10	32	
5	Tranmere Rovers	18	8	3	7	29	32	−3	27	
6	Liverpool	18	6	2	10	28	27	+1	20	
7	Southampton Saints	18	5	3	10	20	35	−15	18	
8	Millwall Lionesses	18	3	6	9	14	26	−12	15	
9	Bradford City (R)	18	2	4	12	16	59	−43	10	Relegation to the Northern Division
10	Ilkeston Town (R)	18	2	2	14	14	51	−37	8	Relegation to the Northern Division

Source: FA WPL
(C) Champions; (R) Relegated

==== Northern Division ====
Pos	Team	Pld	W	D	L	GF	GA	GD	Pts	Promotion or relegation
1	Aston Villa (C, P)	18	14	3	1	57	14	+43	45	Promotion to the National Division
2	Blyth Spartans Kestrels	18	11	4	3	44	17	+27	37	
3	Leeds United	18	9	5	4	67	29	+38	32	
4	Wolverhampton Wanderers	18	9	5	4	40	25	+15	32	
5	Sheffield Wednesday	18	9	4	5	49	28	+21	31	
6	Garswood Saints	18	8	5	5	39	29	+10	29	
7	Berkhamsted Town	18	7	1	10	35	54	−19	22	Moved to the Southern Division
8	Coventry City	18	3	1	14	14	63	−49	10	
9	Huddersfield Town	18	2	3	13	24	67	−43	9	
10	Arnold Town	18	1	3	14	10	53	−43	6	

Source: FA WPL
(C) Champions; (P) Promoted

==== Southern Division ====
Pos	Team	Pld	W	D	L	GF	GA	GD	Pts	Promotion or relegation
1	Reading Royals (C, P)	18	13	2	3	59	21	+38	41	Promotion to the National Division
2	Whitehawk	18	12	3	3	56	15	+41	39	
3	Three Bridges	18	11	2	5	35	27	+8	35	
4	Brighton & Hove Albion	18	9	6	3	35	21	+14	33	
5	Wimbledon	18	9	1	8	41	45	−4	28	
6	Barry Town	18	7	5	6	21	27	−6	26	
7	Langford	18	7	2	9	34	27	+7	23	
8	Barnet	18	4	3	11	28	52	−24	15	
9	Leyton Orient	18	3	2	13	24	58	−34	11	
10	Ipswich Town	18	2	0	16	22	62	−40	6	

Source: FA WPL
(C) Champions; (P) Promoted

=== FA Women's Cup ===
==== Final ====
3 May 1999
14:30 BST

Arsenal	2–0	Southampton Saints
Hayes 14' (o.g.); Wheatley 41'	Report

The Valley, London
Attendance: 6,450
Referee: Wendy Toms (Dorset)

== Famous debutants ==
The season saw several future England players make their first-team debuts.

- Steven Gerrard, 18, appeared as a late substitute for Liverpool in their win over Blackburn Rovers in November 1998, starting a long career at the heart of the Reds' first-team.
- Future England defender Wayne Bridge made his first-team debut for Southampton in their 2–1 home loss to Liverpool in August 1998.
- 19-year-old Leeds United goalkeeper Paul Robinson enjoyed several first-team appearances, the first being a goalless draw with Chelsea in October 1998.
- Robinson's Leeds teammate Alan Smith, 18, made an immediate impact at Liverpool the following month, coming off the bench to score almost instantly.
- Jonathan Woodgate, 18, played for Leeds in their 1–1 draw with Nottingham Forest in October 1998 and ended the season as part of the England side.
- Defender John Terry, 17, played for Chelsea for the first time in the final minutes of a League Cup win over Aston Villa in October 1998.
- 17-year-old Joe Cole made his debut for West Ham United in a 4–1 defeat to Manchester United

== Retirements ==
- Steve Nicol, 37, retired from playing after a season at Doncaster Rovers, after his efforts to get them back into the Football League from the Conference proved unsuccessful.
- Ian Rush, 37, retired from playing after a season at Wrexham in Division Two.
- Steve Bruce, 38, Sheffield United player-manager, made his last professional appearance on 28 November 1998 and officially announced his retirement as a player on 24 May 1999.
- Chris Waddle, 37, left Torquay United on 3 November 1998 after a seven-match spell with the Division Three club.
- Steve Bull, 34, retired from playing after 13 years and a club record 306 goals at Wolverhampton Wanderers, where he was the longest serving player by the time he announced his retirement on 13 July 1999.

== Deaths ==
- 2 September 1998: Jackie Blanchflower, 65, was a Manchester United and Northern Ireland centre-half during the 1950s. He suffered a fractured pelvis in the Munich air disaster of 1958 and retired from football following medical advice a year later. He was the younger brother of former Tottenham Hotspur captain Danny Blanchflower (1926–1993).
- 23 September 1998: Ray Bowden, 89, was the last surviving member of Arsenal great interwar side, having played for them as an inside-forward from 1933 and 1937, during which time he collected three league titles and an FA Cup winner's medal.
- 18 October 1998: Dick Sheppard, 53, played 39 league games in goal for West Bromwich Albion during the 1960s before a six-year spell at Bristol Rovers which yielded 151 league appearances. He later served the West Country club as a goalkeeping coach.
- 7 November 1998: John Osborne, 57, who died of cancer, kept goal for West Bromwich Albion in their 1968 FA Cup triumph. He began his career with Chesterfield and after reaching the pinnacle of his career with Albion he wound up with Walsall.
- 24 December 1998: Matt Gillies, 77, managed Leicester City to their first major trophy in 1964 when they won the League Cup during his club record 10-year spell as manager. They also reached two FA Cup finals when he was in charge, losing both times. He had also played more than 100 league games for the club as a player in the 1950s, signing from Bolton Wanderers after starting his career with Motherwell in his native Scotland.
- 25 December 1998: John McGrath, 60, was manager of Preston North End when they won promotion to the Third Division in 1987. As a player, he was centre-half for clubs including Newcastle United and Southampton. He died of a heart attack on Christmas Day, six years after leaving his final managerial post at Halifax Town.
- 18 January 1999: Horace Cumner, 80, who was capped three times as a forward for Wales in the late 1930s, starting his playing career at Arsenal, playing 14 league games and scoring three goals before signing for Notts County after the end of World War II. He later turned out for Watford, Scunthorpe United and Bradford City in a career which continued into the 1950s.
- 4 February 1999: Arthur Mann, 51, began his footballing career at Hearts before moving south of the border to play for Manchester City and later Notts County, Shrewsbury Town, Mansfield Town and finally non-league Kettering Town. Was later assistant manager to Alan Buckley at Grimsby Town (1989–1994) and later West Bromwich Albion (1994–1997). Died in an accident at a scrapyard in Birmingham.
- 23 February 1999: Les Howe, 86, scored 26 league goals in 165 appearances for Tottenham Hotspur as a wing-half in the 1930s before his career was effectively ended by the war.
- 1 March 1999: Albert "Digger" Kettle, 76, was a defender in the Colchester United side which was elected to the Football League in 1950, and played a total of 145 games for the club in the Southern League and Football League.
- 6 March 1999: Dennis Viollet, 65, was another former Manchester United player (centre-forward) and Munich air disaster survivor. He continued playing after the tragedy and remained on United's payroll until he joined Stoke City in 1962, by which time he had scored 179 goals in all competitions for the club and scored 32 league goals in the 1959–60 season, a club record. At the time of his death from cancer, he was living in the United States of America, having coached various teams there since the 1970s. Despite his goalscoring success at the highest level, he was only capped twice by England.
- 16 March 1999: John Liddell, 65, had a prolific start to his senior career in his native Scotland after joining St Johnstone in his mid twenties, scoring 32 goals in 35 league games before moving south of the border to Oldham Athletic in 1961, where he played 23 league games and scored 10 goals before joining non-league Mossley a year later. He then turned out for Worcester City.
- 28 April 1999: Sir Alf Ramsey, 79, managed England to their finest moment – World Cup glory in 1966. Had played for Tottenham and England during the postwar years and had proved himself as a club manager by winning the league title for Ipswich Town in 1962 – at the end of their first season as a top division club. Remained at the helm with England until 1974, and later had a brief spell as manager of Birmingham City.
- 29 April 1999: Les Bennett, 81, played 272 league games at inside-forward for Tottenham Hotspur between 1946 and 1954, and was a key player in the title winning side of 1951. He completed his senior career with West Ham United before playing for a further five years at non-league level, finally hanging up his boots in 1960 at the age of 42.
- 14 May 1999: Bobby Veck, 79, played 23 league games for Southampton in the immediate postwar years before signing for Gillingham on their return to the Football League in 1950, playing 36 league games and scoring 12 goals for them before retiring from senior football to play in the non-league divisions.
- 2 June 1999: Ron Reynolds, 71, began his career as a goalkeeper at Aldershot at the end of World War II, playing 114 games in the Third Division North before signing for Tottenham Hotspur in 1950. He was at White Hart Lane for 10 years and played 86 league games for the club. He then signed for Southampton and made 90 league appearances for the Saints before his career was ended by injury in 1963.
