= 1997–98 FA Women's Premier League =

FA Women's Premier League
- Season: 1997–98

The 1997–98 FA Women's Premier League season was the 7th season of the FA Women's Premier League.

== National Division ==
FA Women's Premier League National Division
- Season: 1997–98
- Champions: Everton; 1st title
- Relegated: Berkhamsted Town; Wembley
- Matches: 90
- Goals: 375 (4.17 per match)
- Biggest home win: Bradford City 12–0 Wembley (22 February 1998)
- Longest winless run: Wembley (18)

Locations of the FA Women's Premier League National Division Teams
Locations of the FA Women's Premier League National Division Teams (Greater London)

Changes from last season:

- Bradford City were promoted from the Northern Division
- Berkhamsted Town were promoted from the Southern Division
- Ilkeston Town were relegated to the Northern Division
- Southampton Saints were relegated to the Southern Division

=== League table ===
| Pos | Team | Pld | W | D | L | GF | GA | GD | Pts | Qualification or relegation |
|---|---|---|---|---|---|---|---|---|---|---|
| 1 | Everton (C) | 18 | 13 | 4 | 1 | 54 | 14 | +40 | 43 | |
| 2 | Arsenal | 18 | 12 | 4 | 2 | 55 | 22 | +33 | 40 | |
| 3 | Doncaster Belles | 18 | 12 | 2 | 4 | 54 | 18 | +36 | 38 | |
| 4 | Croydon | 18 | 10 | 5 | 3 | 47 | 14 | +33 | 35 | |
| 5 | Millwall Lionesses | 18 | 8 | 5 | 5 | 37 | 15 | +22 | 29 | |
| 6 | Liverpool | 18 | 8 | 3 | 7 | 33 | 25 | +8 | 27 | |
| 7 | Tranmere Rovers | 18 | 5 | 4 | 9 | 33 | 43 | −10 | 19 | |
| 8 | Bradford City | 18 | 3 | 3 | 12 | 38 | 52 | −14 | 12 | |
| 9 | Berkhamsted Town (R) | 18 | 3 | 2 | 13 | 22 | 64 | −42 | 11 | Relegation to the Northern Division |
| 10 | Wembley (R) | 18 | 0 | 0 | 18 | 3 | 109 | −106 | 0 | Relegation to the Southern Division |

Source: FA WPL
(C) Champions; (R) Relegated

=== Results ===
| Home \ Away | ARS | BER | BRA | CRO | DON | EVE | LIV | MIL | TRA | WEM |
|---|---|---|---|---|---|---|---|---|---|---|
| Arsenal | — | 3–1 | 4–2 | 3–3 | 1–0 | 2–2 | 3–0 | 1–0 | 5–0 | 9–1 |
| Berkhamsted Town | 1–7 | — | 3–3 | 1–6 | 2–9 | 0–3 | 0–5 | 1–2 | 2–2 | 5–0 |
| Bradford City | 1–3 | 0–1 | — | 1–2 | 1–5 | 0–3 | 2–2 | 1–3 | 3–0 | 12–0 |
| Croydon | 2–2 | 4–0 | 8–0 | — | 1–3 | 0–0 | 0–2 | 0–0 | 4–0 | 6–0 |
| Doncaster Belles | 2–1 | 4–0 | 3–3 | 0–1 | — | 2–1 | 3–1 | 1–0 | 1–1 | 6–0 |
| Everton | 3–1 | 5–0 | 5–1 | 1–0 | 2–1 | — | 4–1 | 1–0 | 3–2 | 8–0 |
| Liverpool | 0–2 | 4–1 | 3–1 | 0–3 | 2–1 | 0–2 | — | 0–0 | 2–1 | 4–0 |
| Millwall Lionesses | 1–1 | 2–0 | 5–0 | 0–0 | 1–2 | 1–1 | 1–1 | — | 7–3 | 3–0 |
| Tranmere Rovers | 2–4 | 5–2 | 2–1 | 1–1 | 0–2 | 3–3 | 1–0 | 1–2 | — | 5–0 |
| Wembley | 1–3 | 0–2 | 0–7 | 0–4 | 0–9 | 0–7 | 0–6 | 0–9 | 1–4 | — |

Source: FA WPL
Legend: Blue = home team win; Yellow = draw; Red = away team win.

== Northern Division ==
FA Women's Premier League Northern Division
- Season: 1997–98
- Champions: Ilkeston Town
- Promoted: Ilkeston Town
- Relegated: Bloxwich Town
- Matches: 90
- Goals: 337 (3.74 per match)
- Biggest home win: Blyth Spartans Kestrels 7–0 Coventry City
- Biggest away win: Bloxwich Town 0–11 Ilkeston Town
- Longest winless run: Bloxwich Town (18)

Map showing the locations of the teams in the Northern Division of the FA Women's Premier League
Map showing the locations of the teams in the Northern Division of the FA Women's Premier League

Changes from last season:

- Bradford City were promoted from the Northern Division
- Coventry City were promoted to the Northern Division
- Ilkeston Town were relegated from the National Division
- Notts County became Arnold Town
- Stourport Swifts became Bloxwich Town
- Bronte were dissolved

=== League table ===
| Pos | Team | Pld | W | D | L | GF | GA | GD | Pts | Promotion or relegation |
|---|---|---|---|---|---|---|---|---|---|---|
| 1 | Ilkeston Town (C, P) | 18 | 17 | 0 | 1 | 68 | 6 | +62 | 51 | Promotion to the National Division |
| 2 | Garswood Saints | 18 | 12 | 3 | 3 | 43 | 23 | +20 | 39 | |
| 3 | Aston Villa | 18 | 10 | 2 | 6 | 38 | 23 | +15 | 32 | |
| 4 | Wolverhampton Wanderers | 18 | 8 | 5 | 5 | 33 | 20 | +13 | 29 | |
| 5 | Blyth Spartans Kestrels | 18 | 8 | 4 | 6 | 40 | 23 | +17 | 28 | |
| 6 | Sheffield Wednesday | 18 | 8 | 3 | 7 | 39 | 40 | −1 | 27 | |
| 7 | Huddersfield Town | 18 | 7 | 3 | 8 | 32 | 31 | +1 | 24 | |
| 8 | Coventry City | 18 | 2 | 6 | 10 | 22 | 62 | −40 | 12 | |
| 9 | Arnold Town | 18 | 2 | 4 | 12 | 11 | 36 | −25 | 10 | |
| 10 | Bloxwich Town (R) | 18 | 0 | 2 | 16 | 12 | 74 | −62 | 2 | Relegation to the Midland Combination League |

Source: FA WPL
(C) Champions; (P) Promoted; (R) Relegated

=== Results ===
| Home \ Away | ART | ASV | BLT | BSK | CVC | GAS | HUT | ILT | SHW | WOW |
|---|---|---|---|---|---|---|---|---|---|---|
| Arnold Town | — | 0–1 | 1–1 | 0–3 | 1–1 | 0–1 | 0–2 | 0–2 | 0–5 | 0–5 |
| Aston Villa | 0–0 | — | 5–0 | 1–3 | 4–0 | 3–4 | 2–3 | 0–2 | 1–0 | 2–0 |
| Bloxwich Town | 0–2 | 0–6 | — | 2–7 | 0–0 | 1–7 | 0–2 | 0–11 | 2–5 | 0–1 |
| Blyth Spartans Kestrels | 1–1 | 0–1 | 3–0 | — | 7–0 | 2–3 | 1–1 | 0–3 | 3–0 | 3–1 |
| Coventry City | 3–1 | 1–3 | 2–1 | 0–3 | — | 1–4 | 2–2 | 0–7 | 1–1 | 2–2 |
| Garswood Saints | 3–0 | 1–3 | 2–0 | 3–1 | 3–3 | — | 1–2 | 1–2 | 2–1 | 1–1 |
| Huddersfield Town | 2–1 | 0–1 | 8–2 | 2–2 | 6–3 | 0–2 | — | 0–2 | 1–2 | 0–4 |
| Ilkeston Town | 4–0 | 3–0 | 4–0 | 1–0 | 7–1 | 1–2 | 1–0 | — | 6–0 | 3–0 |
| Sheffield Wednesday | 0–3 | 5–4 | 4–3 | 1–1 | 6–1 | 1–2 | 3–1 | 2–7 | — | 1–0 |
| Wolverhampton Wanderers | 2–1 | 1–1 | 4–0 | 3–0 | 4–1 | 1–1 | 2–0 | 0–2 | 2–2 | — |

Source: FA WPL
Legend: Blue = home team win; Yellow = draw; Red = away team win.

== Southern Division ==
FA Women's Premier League Southern Division
- Season: 1997–98
- Champions: Southampton Saints
- Promoted: Southampton Saints
- Relegated: Rushden & Diamonds
- Matches: 90
- Goals: 435 (4.83 per match)
- Biggest away win: Rushden & Diamonds 1–16 Whitehawk

Map showing the locations of the teams in the Southern Division of the FA Women's Premier League
Map showing the locations of the teams in the Southern Division of the FA Women's Premier League

Changes from last season:

- Berkhamsted Town were promoted to the National Division
- Barry Town were promoted to the Southern Division
- Southampton Saints were relegated from the National Division
- Oxford United were relegated from the Southern Division
- Town & County Diamonds became Rushden & Diamonds

=== League table ===
| Pos | Team | Pld | W | D | L | GF | GA | GD | Pts | Promotion or relegation |
|---|---|---|---|---|---|---|---|---|---|---|
| 1 | Southampton Saints (C, P) | 18 | 12 | 6 | 0 | 50 | 14 | +36 | 42 | Promotion to the National Division |
| 2 | Brighton & Hove Albion | 18 | 12 | 2 | 4 | 64 | 21 | +43 | 38 | |
| 3 | Wimbledon | 18 | 11 | 3 | 4 | 64 | 30 | +34 | 36 | |
| 4 | Langford | 18 | 10 | 4 | 4 | 52 | 33 | +19 | 34 | |
| 5 | Whitehawk | 18 | 9 | 4 | 5 | 69 | 30 | +39 | 31 | |
| 6 | Barry Town (Note: Barry Town given wins against Ipswich Town and twice against Rushden and Diamonds as fixtures unfulfilled) | 18 | 6 | 5 | 7 | 23 | 29 | −6 | 23 | |
| 7 | Three Bridges | 18 | 7 | 1 | 10 | 47 | 37 | +10 | 22 | |
| 8 | Ipswich Town | 18 | 5 | 3 | 10 | 33 | 31 | +2 | 18 | |
| 9 | Leyton Orient | 18 | 3 | 2 | 13 | 23 | 62 | −39 | 11 | |
| 10 | Rushden & Diamonds (R) | 18 | 0 | 0 | 18 | 10 | 148 | −138 | 0 | Relegation to the South East Combination League |

Source: FA WPL
(C) Champions; (P) Promoted; (R) Relegated

=== Results ===
| Home \ Away | BAT | BHA | IPT | LAN | LEO | RAD | SOS | THB | WHI | WIM |
|---|---|---|---|---|---|---|---|---|---|---|
| Barry Town | — | 1–0 | P–P | 0–0 | 3–1 | P–P | 2–2 | 2–3 | 1–3 | 2–2 |
| Brighton & Hove Albion | 1–0 | — | 5–1 | 5–1 | 5–0 | 17–0 | 0–4 | 3–0 | 1–4 | 3–2 |
| Ipswich Town | 1–1 | 1–2 | — | 1–2 | 3–1 | 4–0 | 1–1 | 2–1 | 0–2 | 1–2 |
| Langford | 2–5 | 4–1 | 3–1 | — | 1–0 | 9–0 | 2–2 | 2–0 | 1–1 | 1–4 |
| Leyton Orient | 3–2 | 0–5 | 0–2 | 1–3 | — | 4–0 | 1–1 | 1–2 | 2–2 | 1–5 |
| Rushden & Diamonds | P–P | 1–10 | 0–11 | 1–11 | 4–6 | — | 0–9 | 0–7 | 1–16 | 1–6 |
| Southampton Saints | 1–0 | 0–0 | 4–0 | 4–1 | 3–1 | 6–1 | — | 3–0 | 1–1 | 2–1 |
| Three Bridges | 2–0 | 0–3 | 1–1 | 1–2 | 6–2 | 17–0 | 1–2 | — | 2–2 | 1–6 |
| Whitehawk | 7–2 | 2–2 | 2–1 | 3–4 | 8–0 | 7–0 | 1–3 | 2–0 | — | 2–3 |
| Wimbledon | 2–2 | 0–1 | 3–2 | 3–3 | 6–1 | 8–0 | 1–2 | 4–0 | 5–4 | — |

Source: FA WPL
Legend: Blue = home team win; Yellow = draw; Red = away team win.
