= 1998–99 FA Women's Premier League Cup =

Tournament details
- Country: England

Final positions
- Champions: Arsenal
- Runners-up: Everton

The 1998–99 FA Women's Premier League Cup was the 8th staging of the FA Women's Premier League Cup, a knockout competition for England's top 36 women's football clubs.

The tournament was won by Arsenal, who beat Everton 3–1 in the final.

== Results ==
=== First round ===
Matches were played on 27 September and 4 October 1998. Arsenal and Croydon were given byes into the next round.

27 September 1998	Aston Villa (NO)	1–5	Tranmere Rovers (NA)
	Goal	Report	Goal

27 September 1998	Barnet (S)	0–2	Brighton & Hove Albion (S)
		Report	Goal

27 September 1998	Coventry City (NO)	0–1	Berkhamsted Town (NO)
		Report	Goal

27 September 1998	Everton (NA)	0–0 (a.e.t.) (3–0 p)	Millwall Lionesses (NA)
		Report
	Penalties
	Penalty scored		Penalty missed

27 September 1998	Huddersfield Town (NO)	1–2	Garswood Saints (NO)
	Goal	Report	Goal

27 September 1998	Langford (S)	2–1	Bradford City (NA)
	Tennison 44' (o.g.); Churchman	Report	Barber 18'

27 September 1998	Three Bridges (S)	0–6	Doncaster Belles (NA)
		Report	Walker 20', 45', 67', 70'; Exley 30'; Utley 54'

27 September 1998	Leeds United (NO)	3–0	Ilkeston Town (NA)
	Ward; Mitchell	Report

27 September 1998	Liverpool (NA)	5–1	Ipswich Town (S)
	Caterall 10'; Oakford; Formston; Hewitt	Report	Goal

27 September 1998	Wolverhampton Wanderers (NO)	3–2	Reading Royals (S)
	Lacey 40'; Brown 88'	Report	Williams; Strudley

4 October 1998	Leyton Orient (S)	2–4	Barry Town (S)
	Goal	Report	Goal

4 October 1998	Southampton Saints (NA)	3–3 (a.e.t.) (3–4 p)	Blyth Spartans Kestrels (NO)
	Goal	Report	Goal
	Penalties
	Penalty scored Penalty missed		Penalty scored

4 October 1998	Whitehawk (S)	3–2	Arnold Town (NO)
	Goal	Report	Goal

4 October 1998	Wimbledon (S)	5–3	Sheffield Wednesday (NO)
	Goal	Report	Goal

=== Second round ===
Matches were played on 25 October and 1, 22 and 29 November 1998.

25 October 1998	Langford (S)	5–0	Barry Town (S)
	Seaman 5', 7'; Churchman; Schuler 73'; Mahoney	Report

25 October 1998	Blyth Spartans Kestrals (NO)	2–2 (a.e.t.) (4–3 p)	Brighton & Hove Albion (S)
	Goal	Report	Goal
	Penalties
	Penalty scored		Penalty scored Penalty missed

1 November 1998	Doncaster Belles	1–1 (a.e.t.) (1–3 p)	Croydon
	Exley 90+5'	Report	Roberts 47'
	Penalties
	Walker (penalty missed); Coulthard (penalty scored); Lowe (penalty missed); Andås (penalty missed)		Davis (penalty scored); Fletcher (penalty missed); Proctor (penalty scored); Bampton (penalty scored)

22 November 1998	Everton (NA)	4–0	Wimbledon (S)
	Jones; Burke; Bertie	Report

22 November 1998	Tranmere Rovers (NA)	9–1	Berkhamsted Town (NO)
	Copeland; Smith; Davies; Carter; Massey	Report	Creary

22 November 1998	Liverpool (NA)	3–4	Whitehawk (S)
	Goal	Report	Goal

29 November 1998	Arsenal (NA)	9–0	Wolverhampton Wanderers (NA)
	Yankey 18', 43'; Few 24'; Spacey 30', 37' (pen.), 60', 84'; Grant 33'; White	Report

29 November 1998	Leeds United (NO)	2–3	Garswood Saints (NO)
	Knight; Ward	Report	Goal

=== Quarter-finals ===
Matches were played on 3 and 24 January 1999. Tranmere Rovers were given a walkover when Garswood Saints failed to fulfill the fixture.

3 January 1999	Everton (NA)	5–0	Blyth Spartans Kestrals (NO)
	Gore; Mason; Jones; Bertie; (o.g.)	Report

3 January 1999	Whitehawk (S)	2–0	Langford (S)
	Streeter 49'; Melia	Report

3 January 1999	Tranmere Rovers (NA)	W–O	Garswood Saints (NO)
		Report

24 January 1999	Arsenal (NA)	1–0	Croydon (NA)
	Spacey 67'	Report

=== Semi-finals ===
Matches were played on 24 and 31 January 1999.

24 January 1999	Everton (NA)	2–1	Tranmere Rovers (NA)
	Marley 21'; Jones 25'	Report	Gardner 35'

31 January 1999	Whitehawk (S)	1–4	Arsenal (NA)
	Banks 3'	Report	Spacey; Grant; White

=== Final ===
28 March 1999
13:00 GMT

Everton	1–3	Arsenal
Mason 10'	Report	Grant 20'; Yankey 74'; Spacey 90+2'

Prenton Park, Prenton
Attendance: 3,005
