= Wales women's national football team results (1990–1999) =

- Win Draw Loss

This is a list of the 29 Wales women's national football team results and scheduled fixtures from 1990 to 1999.

== Fixtures and results ==
=== 1993 ===
6 September 1993 Friendly	Wales	0–1	Iceland	Port Talbot, Wales
17:00 (BST)		Report		Stadium: Lido Ground

19 September 1993 UEFA Women's Euro 1995 qualifying	Wales	2–3	Switzerland	Cwmbran, Wales
15:00 (BST)	O'Brien 35'; Davies 59'	Report	Vonesch 15'; Sillère 32'; Walther 49'	Stadium: Cwmbran Stadium

=== 1994 ===
31 March 1994 UEFA Women's Euro 1995 qualifying	Germany	12–0	Wales	Bielefeld, Germany
14:05 (CEST)	Mohr 1'; Wiegmann 6', 38', 87'; Meinert 26', 54', 80'; Neid 43', 70'; Voss 57', 67'; Jones 72'	Report		Stadium: Schüco Arena; Attendance: 2,000; Referee: Oleg Timofeyev (Estonia)

2 April 1994 UEFA Women's Euro 1995 qualifying	Switzerland	4–2	Wales	Emmenbrücke, Switzerland
14:30 (CEST)	Sillère 25', 41'; Kälin 65' (pen.); Vonesch 68'	Report	Ball 24' (86)	Stadium: Stadion Gersag

5 April 1994 UEFA Women's Euro 1995 qualifying	Croatia	3–0	Wales	Zagreb, Croatia
	Matuzić 44', 75', 85'	Report		Stadium: Stadion Kranjčevićeva

5 May 1994 UEFA Women's Euro 1995 qualifying	Wales	0–12	Germany	Swansea, Wales
19:30 (BST)		Report	Neid 7'; Minnert 16', 31'; Brocker 35', 59', 61', 77'; Meinert 48', 80'; Austermühl 83'; Wiegmann 85'; Voss 87'	Stadium: Vetch Field; Attendance: 500; Referee: Léon Schelings (Belgium)

22 May 1994 UEFA Women's Euro 1995 qualifying	Wales	1–2	Croatia	Deeside, Wales
15:00 (BST)	Merola 43'	Report	Maslač 20'; Lažnjak 27'	Stadium: Deeside Stadium

5 June 1994 Friendly	Wales	0–2	Republic of Ireland	Pembroke Dock, Wales
13:00 (BST)		Report	Furlong (pen.); Gallagher 69'	Stadium: Bush Camp Playing Fields

=== 1995 ===
8 October 1995 UEFA Women's Euro 1997 qualifying	Wales	0–3	Republic of Ireland	Llanelli, Wales
15:00 (BST)		Report	O'Shea 12'; Gallagher 61'; Boyle 86'	Stadium: Stebonheath Park; Referee: Gudmundur Stefán Maríasson (Iceland)

25 October 1995 UEFA Women's Euro 1997 qualifying	Wales	0–1	Faroe Islands	Bangor, Wales
19:30 (BST)		Report	Ellingsgaard 35'	Stadium: Farrar Road

18 November 1995 UEFA Women's Euro 1997 qualifying	Belgium	2–0	Wales	Brussels, Belgium
14:00 (CET)	Vanslembrouck 22', 41'	Report		Stadium: Koning Boudewijnstadion; Referee: Renatus Temmink (Netherlands)

=== 1996 ===
25 February 1996 UEFA Women's Euro 1997 qualifying	Republic of Ireland	5–1	Wales	Dublin, Ireland
15:00 (GMT)	O'Toole 6', 29'; Boyle 41'; O'Shea 44'; Lyons 57'	Report	Merola 70'	Stadium: Dalymount Park; Referee: Ingrid Jonsson (Sweden)

24 March 1996 UEFA Women's Euro 1997 qualifying	Wales	5–1	Scotland	Newtown, Wales
14:00 (GMT)	O'Sullivan 8', 32'; Merola 25'; Major 41' (o.g.); Davies 88'	Report	Smith 57'	Stadium: Latham Park

13 April 1996 UEFA Women's Euro 1997 qualifying	Wales	0–0	Belgium	Barry, Wales
14:00 (BST)		Report		Stadium: Jenner Park Stadium; Referee: Charles Schaak (Luxembourg)

2 June 1996 UEFA Women's Euro 1997 qualifying	Scotland	3–2	Wales	Aberdeen, Scotland
14:00 (BST)	Major 57'; Sneddon 60'; Lamb 90'	Report	Morgan 1'; Thomas 89'	Stadium: Pittodrie Stadium

8 June 1996 UEFA Women's Euro 1997 qualifying	Faroe Islands	0–1	Wales	Toftir, Faroe Islands
20:00 (WEST)		Report	Jones 31'	Stadium: Svangaskarð

17 November 1996 Friendly	Scotland	0–2	Wales	Ayr, Scotland
15:00 (GMT)		Report	Thomas 15'; C.Jones 70'	Stadium: Somerset Park

=== 1997 ===
2 February 1997 Friendly	Greece	2–2	Wales	Nafplio, Greece
15:00 (EET)		Report	Merola 28'; Peters 88'	Stadium: Ethniko Stadium

20 April 1997 Friendly	Wales	0–0	Greece	Llanelli, Wales
15:00 (BST)		Report		Stadium: Stebonheath Park

7 June 1997 Friendly	Northern Ireland	1–2	Wales	Antrim, Northern Ireland
15:00 (BST)		Report	Thomas 25'; Martyn 53'	Stadium: Allen Park

8 October 1997 1999 FIFA Women's World Cup qualification	Poland	2–2	Wales	Zamość, Poland
14:30 (CEST)	Nieczypor 17', 37'	Report	Davies 28'; Merola 58'

12 October 1997 1999 FIFA Women's World Cup qualification	Belarus	4–1	Wales	Mogilev, Belarus
	Luchenok 6', 7', 29'; Volkova 33' (pen.)	Report	Gunn 81'

7 December 1997 1999 FIFA Women's World Cup qualification	Wales	0–3	Republic of Ireland	Bangor, Wales
14:00 (GMT)		Report	O'Shea 2'; McNally 28', 90'	Stadium: Farrar Road; Referee: Katriina Elovirta (Finland)

=== 1998 ===
8 March 1998 1999 FIFA Women's World Cup qualification	Republic of Ireland	4–0	Wales	Bray, Republic of Ireland
14:00 (GMT)	Reilly 29'; Kierans 57'; Saurin 68', 90'	Report		Stadium: Carlisle Grounds; Referee: Maria Patrascu (Romania)

1 May 1998 1999 FIFA Women's World Cup qualification	Wales	1–5	Poland	Barry, Wales
19:00 (BST)	C.Jones 55'	Report	Leonowicz 25', 60'; Otrębska 44', 48'; Szondermajer 64'	Stadium: Jenner Park

24 May 1998 1999 FIFA Women's World Cup qualification	Wales	3–3	Belarus	Haverfordwest, Wales
15:00 (BST)	Ludlow 71'; Martyn 85'; C.Jones 86'	Report	Tatarinova 2'; Mouraveinikova 38', 56'; Kazlova (red card) 71'; Astasheva (red card) 85'	Stadium: Bridge Meadow Stadium

=== 1999 ===
3 October 1999 UEFA Women's Euro 2001 qualifying	Wales	0–4	Poland	Port Talbot, Wales
15:00 (BST)		Report	Leonowicz 18', 45'; Szondermajer 22'; Otrębska 83'	Stadium: Runtech

24 October 1999 UEFA Women's Euro 2001 qualifying	Austria	1–1	Wales	Langenrohr, Austria
16:00 (CEST)	Krivohravek 76'	Report	C.Jones 2'	Stadium: Neue Sportanlage Langenrohr

1 December 1999 UEFA Women's Euro 2001 qualifying	Wales	0–2	Belgium	Llanelli, Wales
19:00 (GMT)		Report	Maes 49', 54'	Stadium: Stebonheath Park; Referee: Kristin Nordal Mette (Norway)
