= 1999–2000 FA Women's Premier League =

FA Women's Premier League
- Season: 1999–2000

The 1999–2000 FA Women's Premier League season was the 9th season of the FA Women's Premier League. Croydon F.C.'s women's team retained their League title, and added the FA Women's Cup to seal a second double in four years. A 3–0 defeat to Arsenal on 4 May 2000 ended an unbeaten league run stretching back almost two years.

== National Division ==
FA Women's Premier League National Division
- Season: 1999–2000
- Champions: Croydon; 3rd title
- Relegated: Reading Royals; Aston Villa
- Matches: 90
- Goals: 385 (4.28 per match)
- Biggest home win: Everton 13–0 Reading Royals (5 September 1999)
- Biggest away win: Reading Royals 0–10 Doncaster Belles (7 November 1999)
- Longest winless run: Aston Villa (18)

Locations of the FA Women's Premier League National Division Teams

Changes from last season:

- Aston Villa were promoted from the Northern Division
- Reading Royals were promoted from the Southern Division
- Bradford City were relegated to the Northern Division
- Ilkeston Town were relegated to the Northern Division
Locations of the FA Women's Premier League National Division Teams (Greater London)

=== League table ===
Pos	Team	Pld	W	D	L	GF	GA	GD	Pts	Qualification or relegation
1	Croydon (C)	18	15	2	1	58	13	+45	47	
2	Doncaster Belles	18	15	1	2	66	14	+52	46	
3	Arsenal	18	13	2	3	73	13	+60	41	
4	Everton	18	10	3	5	62	31	+31	33	
5	Tranmere Rovers	18	9	1	8	43	36	+7	28	
6	Southampton Saints	18	5	3	10	23	32	−9	18	
7	Millwall Lionesses	18	5	3	10	19	43	−24	18	
8	Liverpool	18	4	4	10	15	38	−23	16	
9	Reading Royals (R)	18	3	2	13	20	84	−64	11	Relegation to the Southern Division
10	Aston Villa (R)	18	0	1	17	6	81	−75	1	Relegation to the Northern Division

Source: FA WPL
(C) Champions; (R) Relegated

=== Results ===
Home \ Away	ARS	AVL	CRO	DON	EVE	LIV	MIL	REA	SOU	TRA
Arsenal	—	10–1	3–0	2–1	5–0	2–0	6–0	9–0	3–0	8–1
Aston Villa	1–8	—	0–4	0–6	2–4	0–0	0–1	0–1	1–3	0–7
Croydon	1–0	2–1	—	2–2	3–0	4–1	1–0	7–2	0–0	1–0
Doncaster Belles	2–0	9–0	0–2	—	3–1	2–1	2–1	6–1	3–0	4–1
Everton	1–1	6–0	4–5	1–4	—	1–1	5–1	13–0	3–0	3–0
Liverpool	1–1	1–0	0–4	1–3	2–4	—	0–3	3–1	2–1	1–0
Millwall Lionesses	0–7	2–0	0–4	1–5	1–1	3–0	—	3–0	1–1	1–1
Reading Royals	0–3	3–0	1–10	0–10	1–6	0–0	4–1	—	1–3	3–6
Southampton Saints	1–3	5–1	0–1	0–2	2–5	5–1	1–0	1–1	—	0–2
Tranmere Rovers	3–2	5–0	1–5	0–2	0–4	6–1	5–0	3–1	2–0	—

Source: FA WPL
Legend: Blue = home team win; Yellow = draw; Red = away team win.

== Northern Division ==
FA Women's Premier League Northern Division
- Season: 1999–2000
- Champions: Blyth Spartans Kestrels
- Promoted: Blyth Spartans Kestrels
- Relegated: Bradford City; Arnold Town
- Matches: 121
- Goals: 506 (4.18 per match)
- Biggest home win: Blyth Spartans Kestrels 11–1 Birmingham City (28 November 1999)

Map showing the locations of the teams in the Northern Division of the FA Women's Premier League

Changes from last season:

- Aston Villa were promoted from the Northern Division
- Bangor City were promoted from the Northern Combination League
- Birmingham City were promoted from the Midland Combination League
- Bradford City were relegated from the National Division
- Berkhamsted Town were moved to the Southern Division
Map showing the locations of the teams in the Northern Division of the FA Women's Premier League

=== League table ===
Pos	Team	Pld	W	D	L	GF	GA	GD	Pts	Promotion or relegation
1	Blyth Spartans Kestrels (C, P)	22	20	1	1	90	21	+69	61	Promotion to the National Division
2	Bangor City	22	14	6	2	44	19	+25	48	
3	Wolverhampton Wanderers	22	13	3	6	64	34	+30	42	
4	Leeds United	22	12	3	7	48	30	+18	39	
5	Sheffield Wednesday	22	10	5	7	44	42	+2	35	
6	Garswood Saints	22	9	7	6	45	39	+6	34	
7	Ilkeston Town	22	7	4	11	33	40	−7	25	
8	Birmingham City	22	6	5	11	32	47	−15	23	
9	Coventry City	22	5	4	13	24	48	−24	19	
10	Huddersfield Town	22	5	4	13	28	56	−28	19	
11	Bradford City (R)	22	5	2	15	40	69	−29	17	Relegation to the Northern Combination League
12	Arnold Town (R)	22	3	2	17	14	61	−47	11	Relegation to the Midland Combination League

Source: FA WPL
(C) Champions; (P) Promoted; (R) Relegated

=== Results ===
Home \ Away	ART	BAC	BIC	BSK	BRC	CVC	GAS	HUT	ILK	LEU	SHW	WOW
Arnold Town	—	0–0	0–1	0–2	0–2	2–1	1–2	0–0	2–0	1–2	1–2	0–3
Bangor City	2–0	—	1–1	0–2	3–1	6–1	2–3	4–1	3–1	4–1	2–0	2–1
Birmingham City	2–0	1–1	—	1–6	4–1	1–2	1–3	0–1	0–3	3–6	3–1	1–1
Blyth Spartans Kestrels	10–1	1–1	11–1	—	7–2	2–0	3–1	5–0	4–0	2–1	1–2	4–3
Bradford City	6–1	1–3	0–5	3–5	—	4–0	1–4	1–3	1–4	1–3	0–2	3–0
Coventry City	3–0	1–2	2–1	0–3	3–2	—	1–1	1–1	1–2	2–2	1–2	1–3
Garswood Saints	4–1	1–1	1–1	0–2	3–1	4–0	—	5–4	2–4	0–2	2–2	1–1
Huddersfield Town	1–2	1–2	2–1	1–4	0–5	0–1	3–2	—	1–1	0–4	2–2	2–3
Ilkeston Town	4–1	0–1	1–0	1–2	0–0	1–1	1–1	6–0	—	0–3	0–2	0–4
Leeds United	4–1	0–1	0–1	2–5	1–1	5–0	1–1	1–2	2–0	—	0–2	3–0
Sheffield Wednesday	3–1	2–2	2–2	1–6	2–3	3–2	1–2	4–3	4–2	1–3	—	2–3
Wolverhampton Wanderers	7–0	0–1	2–1	0–3	7–1	1–0	5–2	2–0	5–2	2–3	2–2	—

Source: FA WPL
Legend: Blue = home team win; Yellow = draw; Red = away team win.

== Southern Division ==
FA Women's Premier League Southern Division
- Season: 1999–2000
- Champions: Barry Town
- Promoted: Barry Town
- Relegated: Whitehawk; Three Bridges
- Matches: 12
- Goals: 570 (47.5 per match)
- Biggest away win: Whitehawk; 0–9 Langford (5 September 1999)
- Longest winless run: Whitehawk (22)

Map showing the locations of the teams in the Southern Division of the FA Women's Premier League

Changes from last season:

- Reading Royals were promoted to the National League
- Wembley Mill Hill were promoted from the South East Combination League
- Cardiff City were promoted from the South West Combination League
- Berkhamsted Town were moved from the Northern Division
- Leyton Orient became Barking
Map showing the locations of the teams in the Southern Division of the FA Women's Premier League

=== League table ===
Pos	Team	Pld	W	D	L	GF	GA	GD	Pts	Promotion or relegation
1	Barry Town (C, P)	22	16	1	5	73	25	+48	49	Promotion to the National Division
2	Brighton & Hove Albion	22	15	4	3	59	22	+37	49	
3	Wembley Mill Hill	22	14	2	6	56	20	+36	44	
4	Ipswich Town	22	14	0	8	54	41	+13	42	
5	Langford	22	11	4	7	46	29	+17	37	
6	Berkhamsted Town	22	9	5	8	41	46	−5	32	
7	Wimbledon	22	9	3	10	58	44	+14	30	
8	Barnet	22	7	7	8	40	50	−10	28	
9	Barking	22	8	3	11	67	57	+10	27	
10	Cardiff City	22	6	3	13	31	63	−32	21	
11	Three Bridges (R)	22	4	6	12	30	48	−18	18	Relegation to the South East Combination League
12	Whitehawk (R)	22	0	0	22	15	125	−110	0	Relegation to the South East Combination League

Source: FA WPL
(C) Champions; (P) Promoted; (R) Relegated

Following relegation and an exodus of players, Three Bridges dissolved during the summer after the end of the season.

=== Results ===
Home \ Away	BRK	BAR	BAT	BET	BHA	CAC	IPT	LAN	THB	WMH	WHI	WIM
Barking	—	3–4	2–4	0–4	3–1	5–1	2–0	1–2	2–2	1–2	9–0	4–1
Barnet	7–4	—	2–1	2–2	1–2	3–1	0–3	1–1	1–1	2–4	6–2	4–3
Barry Town	4–0	7–0	—	3–0	1–2	4–0	2–0	5–0	5–1	3–2	5–0	5–1
Berkhamsted Town	2–6	3–2	2–4	—	1–1	2–2	4–2	3–1	1–1	0–2	3–1	1–1
Brighton & Hove Albion	2–2	2–0	1–1	5–0	—	1–1	5–0	2–1	5–1	3–2	5–0	2–0
Cardiff City	2–1	2–2	1–3	1–2	0–5	—	3–1	0–3	1–2	0–1	6–0	0–5
Ipswich Town	4–3	1–0	4–3	2–0	2–3	4–0	—	2–1	3–2	3–6	11–0	3–2
Langford	2–2	0–0	1–0	3–0	1–0	4–0	0–2	—	2–0	0–2	6–1	4–2
Three Bridges	1–3	1–1	1–3	1–3	1–2	1–2	0–1	2–2	—	0–2	6–2	2–1
Wembley Mill Hill	5–0	0–0	1–2	2–1	0–3	11–0	0–1	0–1	3–0	—	4–0	1–0
Whitehawk	1–9	0–4	1–7	3–5	0–5	0–4	0–5	0–9	2–3	0–2	—	0–4
Wimbledon	5–4	4–0	3–1	1–2	4–2	2–3	4–0	4–2	1–1	2–2	7–1	—

Source: FA WPL
Legend: Blue = home team win; Yellow = draw; Red = away team win.
