= 1998–99 FA Women's Premier League =

FA Women's Premier League
- Season: 1998–99

The 1998–99 FA Women's Premier League season was the 8th season of the FA Women's Premier League.

== National Division ==
FA Women's Premier League National Division
- Season: 1998–99
- Champions: Croydon; 2nd title
- Relegated: Bradford City; Ilkeston Town
- Matches: 90
- Goals: 294 (3.27 per match)
- Biggest away win: Ilkeston Town; 0–9 Arsenal (4 October 1998)
- Longest unbeaten run: Croydon (18)

Locations of the FA Women's Premier League National Division Teams
Locations of the FA Women's Premier League National Division Teams (Greater London)

Changes from last season:

- Ilkeston Town were promoted from the Northern Division
- Southampton Saints were promoted from the Southern Division
- Berkhamsted Town were relegated to the Northern Division
- Wembley were relegated to the Southern Division

=== League table ===
Pos	Team	Pld	W	D	L	GF	GA	GD	Pts	Qualification or relegation
1	Croydon (C)	18	14	4	0	53	11	+42	46	
2	Arsenal	18	13	4	1	59	15	+44	43	
3	Doncaster Belles	18	9	6	3	32	19	+13	33	
4	Everton	18	10	2	6	30	20	+10	32	
5	Tranmere Rovers	18	8	3	7	29	32	−3	27	
6	Liverpool	18	6	2	10	28	27	+1	20	
7	Southampton Saints	18	5	3	10	20	35	−15	18	
8	Millwall Lionesses	18	3	6	9	14	26	−12	15	
9	Bradford City (R)	18	2	4	12	16	59	−43	10	Relegation to the Northern Division
10	Ilkeston Town (R)	18	2	2	14	14	51	−37	8	Relegation to the Northern Division

Source: FA WPL
(C) Champions; (R) Relegated

=== Results ===
Home \ Away	ARS	BRA	CRO	DON	EVE	ILK	LIV	MIL	SOU	TRA
Arsenal	—	6–0	3–3	2–2	4–1	6–0	2–0	1–0	2–1	3–1
Bradford City	0–3	—	2–6	1–5	2–3	3–2	1–3	1–1	1–0	0–0
Croydon	2–2	4–0	—	0–0	1–0	5–0	2–1	2–1	4–0	4–0
Doncaster Belles	1–3	3–0	0–1	—	1–2	1–0	1–0	2–1	2–2	3–0
Everton	2–2	5–0	0–0	1–2	—	2–1	1–0	2–0	0–1	0–4
Ilkeston Town	0–9	2–2	1–4	1–1	1–0	—	0–3	0–2	0–2	3–4
Liverpool	0–5	5–1	0–3	1–2	1–2	2–1	—	1–1	3–0	5–0
Millwall Lionesses	0–1	1–1	4–0	1–1	0–3	3–1	1–0	—	1–1	0–2
Southampton Saints	1–5	5–1	1–3	2–2	0–4	0–1	2–1	2–0	—	0–2
Tranmere Rovers	1–0	5–0	0–5	1–3	0–2	3–1	2–2	1–1	3–0	—

Source: FA WPL
Legend: Blue = home team win; Yellow = draw; Red = away team win.

== Northern Division ==
FA Women's Premier League Northern Division
- Season: 1998–99
- Champions: Aston Villa
- Matches: 90
- Goals: 379 (4.21 per match)
- Biggest home win: Aston Villa 12–1 Berkhamsted Town (18 October 1998)
- Biggest away win: Coventry City 0–6 Aston Villa (13 September 1998)
- Highest scoring: Berkhamsted Town 5–6 Garswood Saints (17 January 1999)

Map showing the locations of the teams in the Northern Division of the FA Women's Premier League
Map showing the locations of the teams in the Northern Division of the FA Women's Premier League

Changes from last season:

- Ilkeston Town were promoted to the National Division
- Leeds United were promoted from the Northern Combination League
- Berkhamsted Town were relegated from the National Division
- Bloxwich Town were relegated to the Midland Combination League

=== League table ===
Pos	Team	Pld	W	D	L	GF	GA	GD	Pts	Promotion or relegation
1	Aston Villa (C, P)	18	14	3	1	57	14	+43	45	Promotion to the National Division
2	Blyth Spartans Kestrels	18	11	4	3	44	17	+27	37	
3	Leeds United	18	9	5	4	67	29	+38	32	
4	Wolverhampton Wanderers	18	9	5	4	40	25	+15	32	
5	Sheffield Wednesday	18	9	4	5	49	28	+21	31	
6	Garswood Saints	18	8	5	5	39	29	+10	29	
7	Berkhamsted Town	18	7	1	10	35	54	−19	22	Moved to the Southern Division
8	Coventry City	18	3	1	14	14	63	−49	10	
9	Huddersfield Town	18	2	3	13	24	67	−43	9	
10	Arnold Town	18	1	3	14	10	53	−43	6	

Source: FA WPL
(C) Champions; (P) Promoted

=== Results ===
Home \ Away	ART	ASV	BET	BSK	CVC	GAS	HUT	LEU	SHW	WOW
Arnold Town	—	0–3	0–3	0–1	2–0	1–3	1–1	0–2	1–4	2–5
Aston Villa	7–0	—	12–1	1–1	4–0	1–0	4–2	2–1	1–0	3–1
Berkhamsted Town	1–0	0–2	—	3–2	3–0	5–6	4–1	2–3	0–2	3–3
Blyth Spartans Kestrels	1–1	3–0	2–0	—	7–0	3–0	5–1	3–0	1–3	0–1
Coventry City	1–0	0–6	3–0	0–2	—	0–2	2–3	2–2	1–6	0–4
Garswood Saints	5–0	2–2	2–1	1–1	1–2	—	0–5	1–1	1–4	2–2
Huddersfield Town	2–2	1–4	0–3	2–4	3–2	1–4	—	1–7	1–5	1–1
Leeds United	10–1	1–1	10–1	2–3	11–0	4–1	3–1	—	5–5	1–1
Sheffield Wednesday	1–0	1–2	2–5	1–1	4–1	0–0	7–2	2–3	—	1–1
Wolverhampton Wanderers	3–0	0–2	4–0	1–4	3–0	1–3	4–1	3–1	2–1	—

Source: FA WPL
Legend: Blue = home team win; Yellow = draw; Red = away team win.

== Southern Division ==
FA Women's Premier League Southern Division
- Season: 1998–99
- Champions: Reading Royals
- Promoted: Reading Royals
- Matches: 90
- Goals: 355 (3.94 per match)
- Biggest away win: Leyton Orient 1–7 Reading Royals
- Highest scoring: Leyton Orient 4–8 Wimbledon

Map showing the locations of the teams in the Southern Division of the FA Women's Premier League
Map showing the locations of the teams in the Southern Division of the FA Women's Premier League

Changes from last season:

- Southampton Saints were promoted to the National Division
- Reading Royals were promoted from the South West Combination League
- Wembley were relegated from the National Division
- Rushden & Diamonds were relegated to the South East Combination League
- Wembley became Barnet

=== League table ===
Pos	Team	Pld	W	D	L	GF	GA	GD	Pts	Promotion or relegation
1	Reading Royals (C, P)	18	13	2	3	59	21	+38	41	Promotion to the National Division
2	Whitehawk	18	12	3	3	56	15	+41	39	
3	Three Bridges	18	11	2	5	35	27	+8	35	
4	Brighton & Hove Albion	18	9	6	3	35	21	+14	33	
5	Wimbledon	18	9	1	8	41	45	−4	28	
6	Barry Town	18	7	5	6	21	27	−6	26	
7	Langford	18	7	2	9	34	27	+7	23	
8	Barnet	18	4	3	11	28	52	−24	15	
9	Leyton Orient	18	3	2	13	24	58	−34	11	
10	Ipswich Town	18	2	0	16	22	62	−40	6	

Source: FA WPL
(C) Champions; (P) Promoted

=== Results ===
Home \ Away	BAR	BAT	BHA	IPT	LAN	LEO	REA	THB	WHI	WIM
Barnet	—	3–3	0–3	2–3	3–2	2–0	2–3	2–2	1–1	0–4
Barry Town	2–1	—	1–1	3–0	1–0	1–0	1–3	0–2	0–2	1–2
Brighton & Hove Albion	3–2	1–1	—	3–2	1–1	4–2	1–1	4–0	1–4	3–0
Ipswich Town	1–3	1–2	1–3	—	1–4	3–2	0–6	1–2	1–4	0–3
Langford	6–0	0–1	0–0	3–1	—	5–2	0–3	0–2	0–1	4–0
Leyton Orient	3–2	0–0	0–2	3–2	1–5	—	1–7	1–1	1–5	4–8
Reading Royals	6–0	1–1	3–1	4–0	0–2	2–1	—	4–0	2–1	8–2
Three Bridges	3–1	2–3	1–0	5–3	1–0	1–2	4–1	—	2–3	3–1
Whitehawk	6–0	6–0	1–1	6–2	6–0	4–0	0–2	0–1	—	4–0
Wimbledon	1–4	2–0	1–3	4–0	3–2	4–1	4–3	1–4	1–1	—

Source: FA WPL
Legend: Blue = home team win; Yellow = draw; Red = away team win.
