= John Liddell (footballer) =

Scottish footballer

Personal information
- Full name: John Cairney Liddell
- Date of birth: 13 December 1933
- Place of birth: Stirling, Scotland
- Date of death: 16 March 1999 (aged 65)
- Place of death: Grangemouth, Scotland
- Position: Centre forward

Youth career
- Kilsyth Rangers: Cambuslang Rangers

Senior career*
| Years | Team | Apps | (Gls) |
| 1959/60 | St Johnstone | 35 | (36) |
| 1961–1962 | Oldham Athletic | 23 | (10) |
| 1962–1963 | Mossley | 17 | (3) |
| | Worcester City | ? | (?) |
| Total | | 75 | (45) |
- * Club domestic league appearances and goals

John Cairney Liddell (13 December 1933 – 16 March 1999) was a Scottish footballer, who played as a centre forward in the Football League.
