= Carol Conlon =

Irish association football player

Personal information
- Full name: Carol Madeline Conlon
- Date of birth: 9 January 1979 (age 47)
- Height: 1.70 m (5 ft 7 in)
- Position: Defender

Senior career*
Years	Team	Apps	(Gls)
- Marks Celtic
- St Patrick's Athletic
1998–2003	Arsenal	3	(0)
2003–2004	Chelsea	1	(0)
- Leyton Orient
- Greenpark
- Fettercain
2011–2013	Shamrock Rovers		

International career
	Republic of Ireland	14	
- * Club domestic league appearances and goals

Carol Madeline Conlon (born 9 January 1979) is a former Irish women's international footballer. Carol played for Arsenal and Chelsea, winning the FA Cup and League Cup during her time in England.

== Club career ==
Conlon started out at Marks Celtic, and later moved to St Patrick's Athletic, where she teamed up with Ciara Grant. Both players were signed by Arsenal in 1998, and both were part of the FA Women's Challenge Trophy side that played Everton at Wembley. Grant started the match, whilst Conlon remained on the bench. Conlon's minutes were limited to a handful of substitute appearances in the League and FA Cup, but did start in two London County Cup ties. In the 1999 FA Women's Cup Final, Conlon started on the bench but did not make an appearance. In her debut season, she won the FA Cup and League Cup.

By 2003, Conlon had moved to Chelsea. She made one appearance for the club, coming off the bench in a league match against Merthyr Tydfil. After a spell wth Leyton Orient, Conlon returned to Ireland, eventually playing for Shamrock Rovers.
