= Ceryl Tindall-Jones =

Wales international footballer

Personal information
- Date of birth: 21 March 1980 (age 46)
- Position: Attacking midfielder

Youth career
- Segontium Rovers

Senior career*
Years	Team	Apps	(Gls)
1995–1998	Bangor City		
1998–2000	Everton		(9)
2000–2002	Bangor City		
2002–2005	Liverpool		
2005–2011	Caernarfon Town		

International career
1996–2004	Wales		(5)
- * Club domestic league appearances and goals

Ceryl Tindall-Jones (née Jones; born 21 March 1980) is a former footballer who played for Everton, Liverpool and the Wales.

== Youth career ==
Jones-Tindall began her career playing for boys' youth side Segontium Rovers. Aged 14 she joined Bangor City (actually a senior side) playing in the FA Women's Premier League Northern division - the second tier of English women's football.

== Club career ==
At Bangor City Girls, aged 15, Jones scored the equalising goal in the 1995 FAW Women's Cup final at the National Stadium in Cardiff, a game they went on to lose on penalties. She also scored the third goal for Bangor when Bangor won the Cup for the first time in 1997, beating Newcastle Emlyn 3 - 0 in Aberystwyth.

In 1998, aged 18, she signed for English champions Everton Ladies. She scored 7 goals in her first season, including the winning goal in the League Cup semi final against Tranmere Rovers.

In 1999, she scored a penalty as Everton beat Arsenal via a penalty shoot-out in the inaugural, unofficial, women's charity shield, played at Wembley immediately before the men's charity shield.

In 2000, she returned to Bangor City, winning back to back Welsh cups, scoring a brace in the 2001 final (a 3-0 win against Newport County) and Bangor's second as they again bested County in the 2002 final and played in the 2002–03 UEFA Women's Cup.

In 2002 she signed for Liverpool, helping them to the 2003–04 FA Women's Premier League Northern Division title. She remained with Liverpool for their season in the top-flight, making 18 starts and scoring once, but left the club after their relegation at the end of the season.

For the 2005-06 season, she returned to Caernarfon Town L.F.C. (which Bangor City Girls had become) where she remained until her retirement in 2011.

== International career ==
Jones earned her first cap for Wales aged 16 against Scotland on 24 March 1996, three days after her sixteenth birthday. She scored her first goal for Wales against the Faroe Islands in June 1996 and went on to score five goals, including a memorable equaliser to seal a point against Belarus from being 3 - 0 down.

Her final appearances for Wales came during the 2004 Algarve Cup.

== Career statistics ==
No.	Date	Venue	Opponent	Score	Result	Competition
`1.	6 June 1996	Svangaskarð, Toftir, Faroe Islands	Faroe Islands	1–0	1–0	UEFA Women's Euro 1997 qualifying
2.	17 November 1996	Somerset Park, Ayr, Scotland	Scotland	2–0	2–0	Friendly
3.	1 May 1998	Jenner Park, Barry, Wales	Poland	1–3	1–5	1999 FIFA Women's World Cup qualification
4.	24 May 1998	Bridge Meadow, Haverfordwest, Wales	Belarus	3–3	3–3	1999 FIFA Women's World Cup qualification
5.	24 October 1999	Neue Sportanlage Langenrohr, Langenrohr, Austria	Austria	1–0	1–1	UEFA Women's Euro 2001 qualifying

== Honours ==
Bangor City Girls

- FAW Women's Cup: 1996–97, 2000–01, 2001–02; runner up 1994–95, 1995–96

Everton

- FA Women's Premier League Cup runner up: 1998–99
- FA Women's Charity Shield: 1999

Liverpool

- FA Women's Premier League Northern Division: 2003–04
- Liverpool Counties Women's Senior Cup: 2003–04

Caernarfon Town Ladies

- FAW Women's Cup runner-up: 2005–06, 2010–11
- Welsh Women's Premier League Northern Conference: 2009–10, 2010–11
