= Bradford City A.F.C. Women =

Coordinates: 53°50′50.82″N 1°43′58.76″W

Bradford City AFC Women
- Full name: Bradford City AFC Women
- Nickname: City
- Founded: 1988
- Ground: Horsfall Stadium
- Capacity: 3,000
- Chairperson: Qasim Akhtar
- Manager: Gareth Davis
- League: North East Regional Women's Football League Premier Division
- 2024-25: North East Regional Women's Football League Premier Division, 2nd of 11
- Website: https://www.bradfordcityafc.com/
Home colours	Away colours	Third colours

'Bradford City AFC Women' is an English women's football club which represents the city of Bradford, West Yorkshire. Founded in 1988, they currently play in the North East Regional Women's Football League Premier Division, and have competed in the Women's National League since promotion from the Northern Combination Women's Football League in 2013. Previously under the title of Bradford City Women's FC, the club announced its merger with Bradford City AFC in January 2021, through the Community Foundation, and has since adopted the name Bradford City AFC Women and Girls

After realigning the club with its former junior girls set up, Bradford City AFC Women has a player pathway from Under 9's through to Senior Football. A new Under 23's Development Team was launched for the 2021 - '22 season, with an aim of providing a stronger pathway for the young women of Bradford to play National League football.

== History ==
=== Early years ===
Founded in 1988 under the auspices of Bradford City's Football in the Community department, the club became founder members of the Yorkshire and Humberside League the following year. After success at local level, the club won promotion into the FA Women's Premier League Northern Division in 1996. The club earned a second successive promotion in 1996–97, into the top level of Women's football in England.

In 1997–98 the club avoided relegation and also reached the semi–final of the FA Women's Premier League Cup – losing on penalties to eventual winners Arsenal after a 2–2 draw. This was despite Arsenal's goalkeeper Sarah Reed being sent–off and defender Tina Mapes taking over in goal. City dropped out of the top division in 1998–99, and suffered a further relegation in 1999–00, into the Northern Combination Women's Football League.

=== Modern era ===
The club gained promotion back to the FA Women's Premier League ahead of the 2013/2014 season. In 2017/18 striker Laura Elford was among the WPL Northern top scorers. Only Leicester's Rosie Axten (30), and Middlesbrough's Emily Scarr (28) scored more than Elford's 25 in all competitions.

Following announcement that long serving Chairwoman Sally Thackray would step down, discussion began with a number of parties over the future running of the club. It was announced on 17 December 2020 that the club would move under the stewardship of Bradford City FC Community Foundation. This would mark the first time in the clubs history that it stood as a part of the 'men's' club at Bradford City AFC. As well as this, the club announced a restructure of its previous committee model, to one that fits into the new system, with Qasim Akhtar announced as the clubs Chairman, overseeing the day-to-day running of the club

Position	Season 2017/18
8th (Tier 3)	(England) WPL Northern
3rd Round	(England) Women's FA Cup
1st Round	(England) WPL Cup
Runners-up	(England) County Cup

== Stadium ==
The club currently shares Bradford Park Avenue's home, Horsfall Community Stadium, having previously played home matches at Thackley FC's Dennyfield ground, Peel Park and the grounds of and Guiseley.

== Current squad ==
As of 3 August 2020.

Note: Flags indicate national team as defined under FIFA eligibility rules; some limited exceptions apply. Players may hold more than one non-FIFA nationality.

No.	Pos.	Nation	Player
1	GK	ENG	Elizabeth Hobson
13	GK	ENG	Hannah Richards
2	DF	ENG	Victoria Thomas
3	DF	ENG	Beth Walker
4	DF	ENG	Charlotte Sales
5	DF	ENG	Katy Woodcock (captain)
19	DF	WAL	Elanna Prothero
25	DF	ENG	Zoe Roberts
33	DF	ENG	Charlotte Stuart
8	MF	ENG	Maisie Norde
16	MF	WAL	Charlotte Gill
20	MF	ENG	Caitlyn Douglas
6	FW	ENG	Amy-Leigh Barrington-Beck
10	FW	ENG	Harriet Jakeman
11	FW	ENG	Keegan Lambert
12	FW	ENG	Corina Riley
14	FW	LAT	Monika Štube

== Individual awards ==
=== Player of the Year ===
Year	Winner
2001	(England)
2002	(England) Catherine Mills
2003	(England) Danielle Domanski
2004	(England) Claire Popplewell
2005	(England)
2006	(England) Dawn Lindley
2007	(England) Alice Thackray
2008	(England)
2009	(England) Caroline Cropp
2010	(England) Whitney Taiwo
2011	(England) Emma Dobson
2012	(England) Abby Parkin
2013	(England) Carrie Simpson

=== Captains ===
The following is a list of the officially appointed captains of the Bradford City WFC first-team.

Name	Nation	Years
Dawn Lindley	England	2006–2007
Becky Griggs	England	2007–2009
Mel Garside-Wight	England	2009–2010
Sarah Binns	England	2010-2011
Bridie Hannon	England	2011–
Harriet Jakeman	England	2018–2019
Maisie Norde	England	2019
Zoe Roberts	England	2019-

== Honours ==
- Northern Combination Women's Football League:
  - Winners (1): 1995–96
- FA Women's Premier League Northern Division:
  - Winners (1): 1996–97

== Link with Bradford City A.F.C. ==
Bradford City Women have always traditionally adopted the colours of Bradford City AFC, despite no formal link between the two clubs. In 2015 BCWFC adopted the same crest and kits as the men's side in order to bring relationships closer together, gaining further support publicly from the club, in particular, the women's team were favoured as a natural exit route for players from Bradford City's girls Centre of Excellence before its closure. Recently, the clubs has both co–operated with sports charity One in a Million with its Junior Girls set-up.

In 2008 an exhibition on the women's team was staged at the bantamspast museum at Valley Parade, with the aim of forging closer links between the clubs.

The women's Under–16 section played at Wembley Stadium as a curtain-raiser to the 1996 Football League Second Division play-off final.

As of 2021 Bradford City Women's has been brought under the umbrella of Bradford City AFC, through the clubs community department, and the adoption of the clubs new title as Bradford City AFC Women, signifying the club as the official Women's side of Bradford City. This merger also realigned the clubs Girls junior set up, ahead of plans to form an official girls academy pathway, leading into a new Under 23's set up. Ryan Sparks, CEO of Bradford City, announced the merger to all staff in January 2021 stating that "No longer will we have Bradford City AFC and Bradford City WFC, but just Bradford City AFC with both Men's and Women's teams"

== Seasons ==
=== Key ===
- P = Played
- W = Games won
- D = Games drawn
- L = Games lost
- F = Goals for
- A = Goals against
- Pts = Points
- WSL = Women's Super League
- PL National = FA Women's Premier League National Division
- PL North = FA Women's Premier League Northern Division
- Northern Comb = Northern Combination Women's Football League
- NE Prem= North East Women's Regional League Premier Division
- NE Div 1 (S) = North East Women's Regional League Division One South
- QR1 = First Qualifying Round
- QR2 = Second Qualifying Round
- QR3 = Third Qualifying Round
- R1 = Round 1
- R2 = Round 2
- R3 = Round 3
- R4 = Round 4
- R5 = Round 5
- R6 = Round 6
- QF = Quarter-finals
- SF = Semi-finals
- RU = Runner Up
- F = Final

Champions	Runners-up	Promoted	Relegated

Division shown in bold when it changes due to promotion or relegation. Top scorer shown in bold with † when they set or equalled a club record.

Season	League									FA Women's Cup	West Riding's County Cup	Europe / Other	Top scorer
Season	Division	P	W	D	L	F	A	Pts	Pos	FA Women's Cup	West Riding's County Cup	Europe / Other	Top scorer
1988–89	no data												
1989–90	no data												
1990–91	no data												
1991–92	no data												
1992–93	no data												
1993–94	no data												
1994–95	no data												
1995–96	no data												
1996–97	**PL North**	16						45	1st				
1997–98	**PL National**	18						12	8th				
1998–99	PL National	18						10	9th				
1999–2000	**PL North**	22						17	11th				
2000–01	**Northern Comb**	no data											
2001–02	Northern Comb	no data											
2002–03	Northern Comb	no data											
2003–04	Northern Comb	no data											
2004–05	Northern Comb										R2		
2005–06	Northern Comb									2Q	W		
2006–07	Northern Comb									R1	SF		
2007–08	Northern Comb									R1	SF		
2008–09	Northern Comb									R2	R3		
2009–10	Northern Comb									R1	QF		
2010–11	Northern Comb	22	7	7	8	32	37	28	7th	3Q	SF		
2011–12	Northern Comb	22	14	1	7	54	25	43	3rd	3rd	RU		
2012–13	Northern Comb	21	15	2	4	54	20	47	3rd	2nd	QF		
2013–14	PL North	20	11	2	7	36	33	35	3rd	3rd			
2014–15	PL North	22	11	6	5	49	28	39	4th	4th			
2015–16	PL North	22	12	2	8	48	31	38	5th	3rd			
2016–17	PL North	20	7	1	12	40	40	22	8th				
