= Tranmere Rovers Women =

- Full name: Tranmere Rovers
- Nickname: Rovers
- Founded: 1990
- Ground: Ellesmere Port Sports Village
- Chairman: Steve Williams
- Manager: Louise Edwards
- League: North West Women's Regional Football League Premier Division
- 2025-2026: North West Women's Regional Football League Premier, 9th of 11
- Website: https://www.tranmererovers.co.uk/teams/women/
Home colours	Away colours

Tranmere Rovers Women are an English football team founded in 1990, based in the Wirral, and affiliated with Tranmere Rovers F.C. Between 1996 and 2004 they competed in the FA Premier League National Division, then the top tier of the English women's football pyramid. They are currently members of the North West Women's Regional Football League Premier Division and play their home games at the Ellesmere Port Sports Village.

== History ==
Tranmere Rovers Ladies were formed in 1990 named by Jayne Lewis indeed Jayne Lewis got the original team together and entered of the North West Regional League with Steve Williams as manager. They played their first competitive game against Bury Girls in September of that year. They won Division Four at their first attempt, and followed this success by winning Division Three in the next year. In the 1992–93 season, they came third in Division Two, winning promotion to the top division of the league. Tranmere finished mid-table in their first season in Division One, but won the division in the following season.

Tranmere won the next tier of the English women's football pyramid – the FA Premier League Northern Division – at the first attempt, with only one defeat all season. They were promoted to the FA Premier League National Division, at the time the top tier of the English league system. The four promotions required to reach this league had been achieved in only five seasons. 1995–96 also saw the team win the Cheshire Shield for the first time, beating Stockport 6–2 in the final.

The team spent eight seasons in the top flight, the most successful period in the club's short history. After finishing 8th in their first season, they came 7th in 1997–98, 5th in each of the following three seasons, 6th twice, before relegation back to the Northern Division with a 10th-placed finish in 2003–04. The team were also successful in the cup competitions during this period; they reached the FA Cup semi-final in 1998–99, losing 2–1 to Southampton Saints. They repeated this feat in 2001–02, but lost 3–1 to Doncaster Belles. In 1999, Tranmere won the Reebok Women's Football Festival in Mansfield, then the traditional curtain-raiser to the season, beating local rivals Everton 1–0 in the final. In 2000, the players featured in a television advert for Daz washing powder alongside Julian Clary. In 2000–01, Tranmere reached the final of the Premier League Cup – their first major cup final – against Arsenal at the Deva Stadium. Though the game was level at half time, Arsenal dominated and eventually ran out 3–0 winners, to secure their fourth successive title. In 2002, Steve Williams stepped down as manager to be replaced by player Louise Edwards.

Tranmere spent five seasons in the Premier League Northern Division, finishing 8th, 3rd, 6th, and 8th, respectively, before being relegated to the Northern Combination with an 11th-placed finish in 2008–09. In 2006, Louise Edwards stepped down as manager, with assistant Shirley Waring taking over. Waring resigned after relegation in 2009; Edwards returned in an interim role, though was still in charge two years later. Edwards and Waring were joint managers. />

In the 2010–11 season, Tranmere came 12th and last in the Northern Combination, and were relegated to North West Regional League, Premier Division. However, in the same season they won the Cheshire Cup for a record 11th time.

Rovers finished 3rd in the North West Regional Football League in the 2023-24 season, behind Blackburn Community Sports Club Women and the champions Cheadle Town F.C. Women. In the following 2024-25 season, Tranmere suffered a 3 points deduction, but still managed a 5th place finish. In the most recent 2025-26 season, Tranmere finished in 9th place.

== Colours ==
Tranmere's colours follow those used by their affiliated men's team. In 1961, Dave Russell joined the club as manager. Tranmere had worn a kit of blue shirts, white shorts and blue socks since 1904 – the same colours as local rivals, Division One club Everton. Russell introduced an all-white strip to set the teams apart; these have been Tranmere's usual colours since.

== Stadium ==
During their first years, Tranmere played in several venues. In 1997, they moved to Gayton Park, the home of West Cheshire League club Heswall F.C.. In 2006, they moved to Victoria Park, the home of Poulton Victoria F.C. In 2009, Poulton Victoria folded, so Tranmere moved to Villa Park, the home of Ashville F.C. in Wallasey, Wirral.

Tranmere continued to play home matches at Ellesmere Port Sports Village during the 2026–27 season.

== Players ==
=== Current squad ===
As of 21 Jan 2025.

Note: Flags indicate national team as defined under FIFA eligibility rules; some limited exceptions apply. Players may hold more than one non-FIFA nationality.

No.	Pos.	Nation	Player
-	GK		Amelia Size
-	GK		Ava Elkerton
-	GK		Lilly Mangan
–	DF		Kiah Sullivan
–	DF		Darcie Aitken
–	DF		Elizabeth Roberts
–	DF		Cloe Robinson
-	DF		Livvi Turkington
-	DF		Ruby Phillips
-	DF		Kiera Onanga
-	MF		Keris McRoberts
–	MF		Anna Jones
–	MF		Amy Shannon
-	MF		Louisa Murphy
–	MF		Anya Mccready
–	MF		Ellie Howard
-	MF		Ellie Doyle
–	FW		Laura Williams
-	FW		Izzy Arrowsmith
-	FW		Lorna Stratton
-	FW		Aaliyah Turner
-	FW		Mollie Darlington

=== Former players ===
A number of Tranmere players have represented their country. In 1992, Sammy Howarth made her England debut against Denmark, going on to win five caps. Goalkeeper Jo Fletcher also played for England, whilst Katie Williams has represented Wales twenty times.

Tranmere's most capped international player is Sue Smith. Smith first appeared for England in 1997, and went on to win 93 caps, scoring 16 goals. Whilst playing for Tranmere, Smith won a number of awards. In 1999, she was voted international player of the year, for her performances in the England team, and players' player of the year. In 2001, she was again awarded the title of international player of the year.

The Swedish international player Tina Nordlund played for Tranmere in 1998–99. She was in a relationship and living with Jesper Blomqvist who was contracted to Manchester United at the time.

In May 2026, long-serving captain Lindsey Smith announced her retirement after 32 years with Tranmere Rovers. The club reported that she had made more than 1,000 appearances during her career.

== Honours ==
As of the start of the 2011–12 season.

- Premier League Cup
  - Runner-up: 2001
- Cheshire Shield
  - Winner: 1996, 1997, 1998, 1999, 2000, 2001, 2002, 2006, 2008, 2009, 2011
  - Runner-up: 2003, 2004
- FA Premier League Northern Division
  - Winner: 1996
- North West Regional League
  - Winner Division 1: 1995
  - Winner Division 3: 1992
  - Winner Division 4: 1991
