= Ilkeston Town L.F.C. =

Ilkeston Town Ladies Football Club is a women's football team based in Ilkeston in Derbyshire, in England.

The club was founded in 1992 as Stanton Rangers, when Spondon Ladies merged with Nottingham Rangers. The team took over Nottingham's position in the FA Women's Premier League. In 1994, it moved to share the New Manor Ground with Ilkeston Town F.C., and in response changed its name to Ilkeston Town Rangers.

The team was relegated to the FA Women's Premier League Northern Division at the end of the 1996/97 season. It won the Northern Division and returned to the Premier League for 1997/98, but was again relegated. In 2002/03, it was demoted from the Northern League, and has more recently played in the East Midlands Regional Women's Football League.
