= Keira Ramshaw =

English footballer

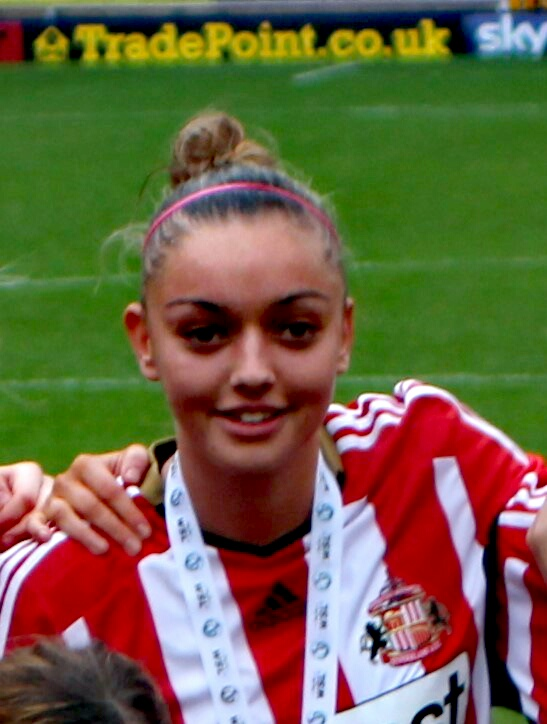
- Keira Ramshaw on 26 October 2014

Personal information
- Full name: Keira Ramshaw
- Date of birth: 12 January 1994 (age 32)
- Place of birth: Sunderland, England
- Positions: Midfielder; striker

Team information
- Current team: Sunderland
- Number: 7

Youth career
- Sunderland

Senior career*
Years	Team	Apps	(Gls)
2009–2023	Sunderland	244	(67)

International career
2012	England U19	5	(0)
- * Club domestic league appearances and goals as of 10 November 2019

Keira Ramshaw (born 12 January 1994) is a former English footballer who played as a midfielder or striker for FA Women's Championship club Sunderland. Ramshaw had spent her entire senior career with Sunderland, making her debut for the club in 2010, and was part of the club's promotion to the FA Women's Super League in 2014. Ahead of the 2018–19 FA Women's National League season, Ramshaw was made club captain. In October 2023, she had to medically retire due to an ankle injury. As of 2025, alongside long-serving captain and former teammate Stephanie Bannon, Ramshaw is one of only two players to have made 200 appearances for Sunderland A.F.C. Women.

== Club career ==
Ramshaw made her first team debut on 18 April 2010, coming on as a substitute in a 4–0 defeat to Everton in the FA Women's Premier League National Division.

She made her full debut away to Watford in the second game of the following season, in September 2010, going on to start 17 of her 19 games in all competitions in 2010–11, a season which saw the club crowned champions.

Ramshaw scored double figures in all competitions in both 2011–12 and 2012–13, with the club winning the FA Women's Premier League National Division in both seasons, seeing them total three titles in a row.

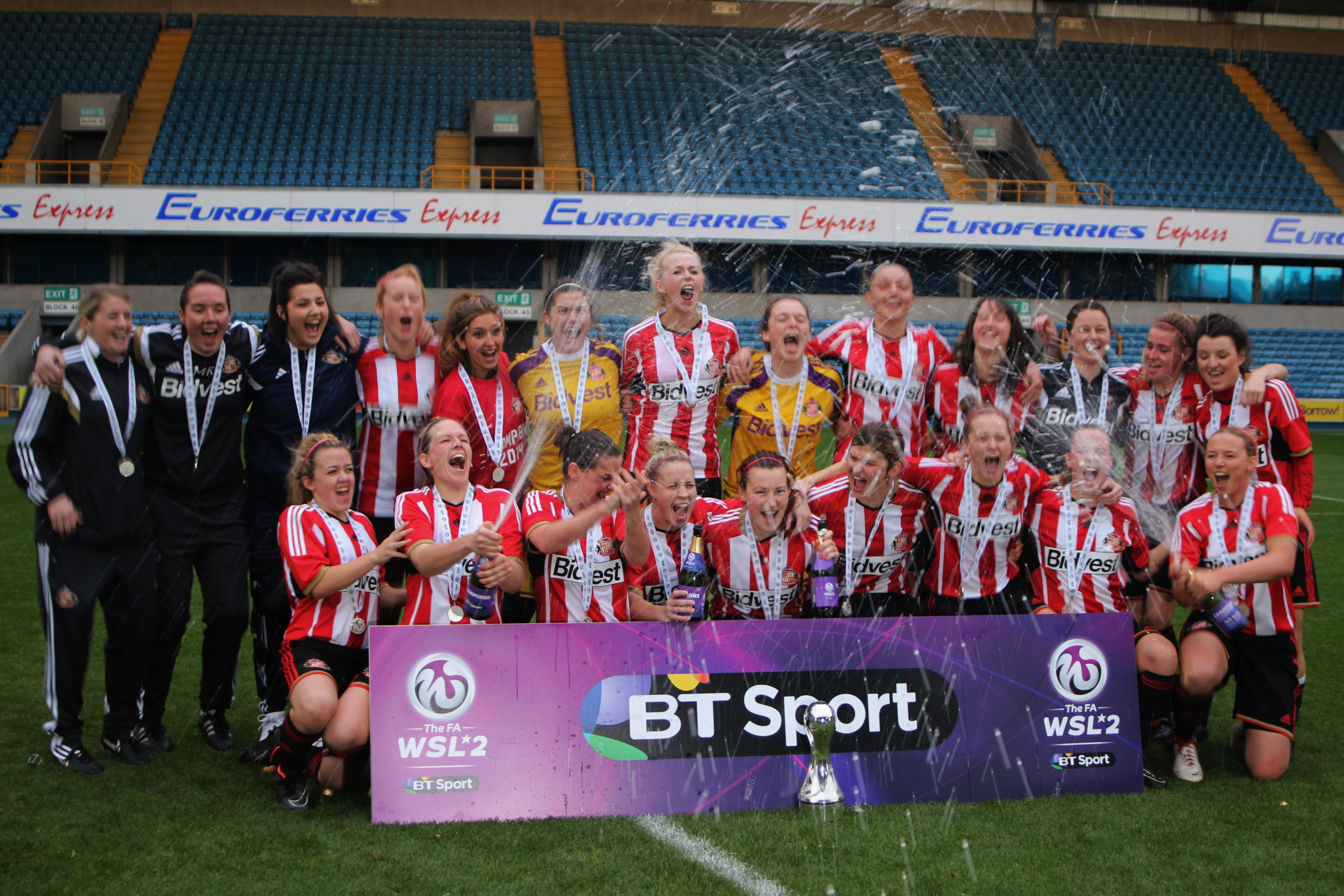
Sunderland celebrate winning the WSL 2 title in 2014

After the club's election to the newly formed FA Women's Super League 2 ahead of 2014, Ramshaw hit double figures in league play for the first time, as Sunderland ended the season as 2014 FA WSL 2 champions. Her 10 goals in 18 games made her the club's joint top scorer, with Beth Mead also scoring 10 league goals.

Ramshaw played less as a striker following promotion to the FA Women's Super League 1, playing across the midfield and as a wing-back. Despite regular game time, she failed to score a FA WSL 1 goal until the 2017–18 season, scoring the winner away at Yeovil Town in October 2017. She also scored a late winner against Aston Villa in February 2018 to send Sunderland into the Women's FA Cup quarter-finals. Ramshaw scored the club's last away goal in WSL 1, scoring in a narrow 2–1 defeat at Chelsea in May 2018.

Following the club's demotion to the FA Women's National League, Ramshaw was one of only four first team players to remain with the club for the 2018–19 season. She was officially announced as club captain on 14 August 2018. She scored her first of the season in the club's first win of the season, a 2–1 victory at Bradford City on match-day two.

Ramshaw made her 200th appearance for Sunderland during the 2019–20 season. As of 2025, this makes her one of only two players who have reached 200 appearances for Sunderland's women team, along with former teammate Stephanie Bannon.

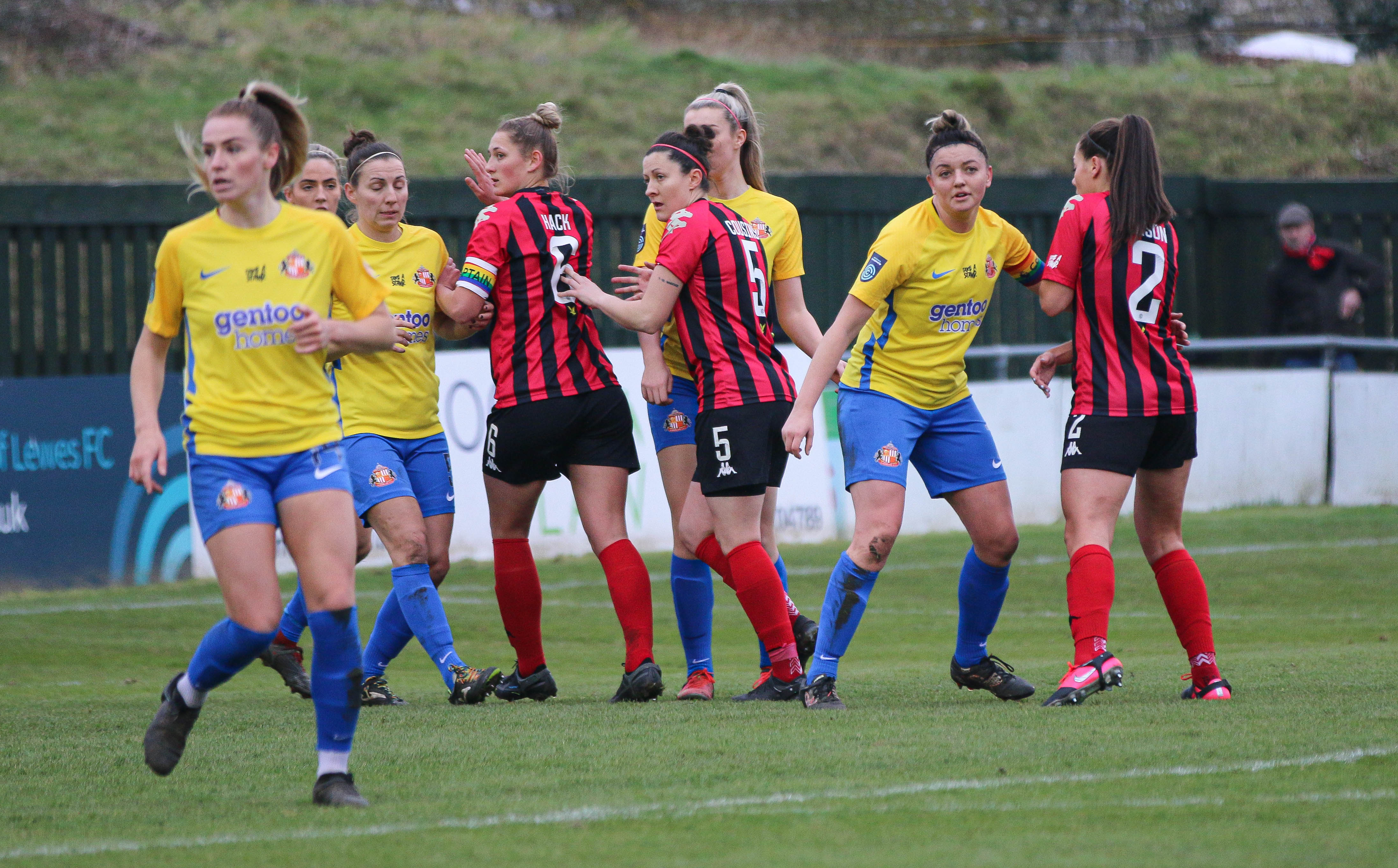
Ramshaw (second player from right) with Sunderland in 2022

She scored her first goal of the 2021-22 season in a 1–1 draw away at Crystal Palace.

On 13 October 2023, Sunderland announced that Ramshaw had been forced to retire due to injury.

== International career ==
Good form in Sunderland's league winning 2011–12 season saw Ramshaw, along with team-mate Beth Mead, be called up to the England women's under-19 squad for the 2012 UEFA Women's Under-19 Championship. She played in two 2nd round qualifiers as well as all three Group Stage games at the finals in Turkey.

== Career statistics ==
=== Club ===
As of 30 April 2020.

Club	League	Season			FA Cup		League Cup		Total	
Club	League	Division	Apps	Goals	Apps	Goals	Apps	Goals	Apps	Goals
Sunderland	FA WPL National Division (Tier 1)*	2009–10	2	0	0	0	0	0	2	0
Sunderland	FA WPL National Division (Tier 2)*	2010–11	17	4	0	0	2	0	19	4
Sunderland	FA WPL National Division (Tier 2)*	2011–12	19	8	0	0	3	3	22	11
Sunderland	FA WPL National Division (Tier 2)*	2012–13	17	9	4	3	7	2	28	14
Sunderland	FA WSL 2	2014	18	10	0	0	5	0	23	10
Sunderland	FA WSL 1	2015	14	0	0	0	5	1	19	1
Sunderland	FA WSL 1	2016	12	0	4	0	1	1	17	1
Sunderland	FA WSL Spring Series	2017	8	0	1	0	–	–	9	1
Sunderland	FA WSL 1	2017–18	15	3	1	1	5	0	21	4
Sunderland	FA WNL North	2018–19	23	24	0	0	3	1	26	25
Sunderland	FA WNL North	2019–20	12	8	0	0	0	0	12	8
Career Total			157	66	10	4	31	8	198	79

* The FA Women's Premier League National Division became the second tier of English Women's Football following the foundation of the FA Women's Super League for the 2011 season.

== Honours ==
Sunderland

- FA Women's Premier League National Division: 2010–11, 2011–12, 2012–13
- FA Women's Premier League Cup: 2012
- FA WSL 2: 2014

Individual

- Sunderland Women's Player of the Year: 2021–22
