= Stephanie Bannon =

English footballer (born 1989)

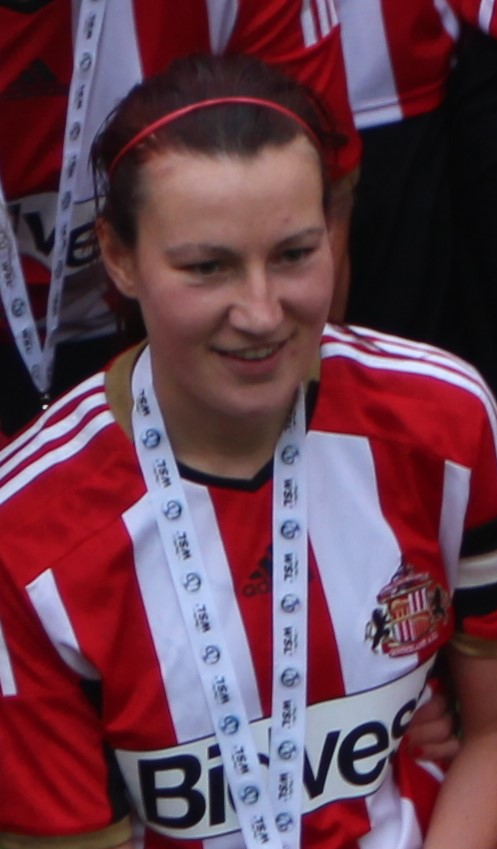
- Bannon after winning the WSL 2 title in 2014

Personal information
- Date of birth: 22 March 1989 (age 37)
- Place of birth: Whitley Bay
- Position: Defender

Youth career
- Sunderland A.F.C. Women

Senior career*
Years	Team	Apps	(Gls)
	Sunderland A.F.C. Women	211	
- * Club domestic league appearances and goals

Stephanie "Steph" Bannon (born 22 March 1989) is an English former footballer who spent her entire senior career with Sunderland A.F.C. Women. After becoming club captain aged 18, she led the team to win three consecutive FA Women's Premier League National Division titles, the 2012–13 FA Women's Premier League Cup, and the 2014 FA WSL 2, and to become runners-up in the 2008–09 FA Women's Cup.

As of 2025, alongside Keira Ramshaw, Bannon is one of only two players to have made 200 appearances for Sunderland A.F.C. Women. Bannon retired from football in 2017, at 28 years old, due to being unable to sustain part-time football alongside her full-time job as a physical education (PE) teacher.

== Career ==
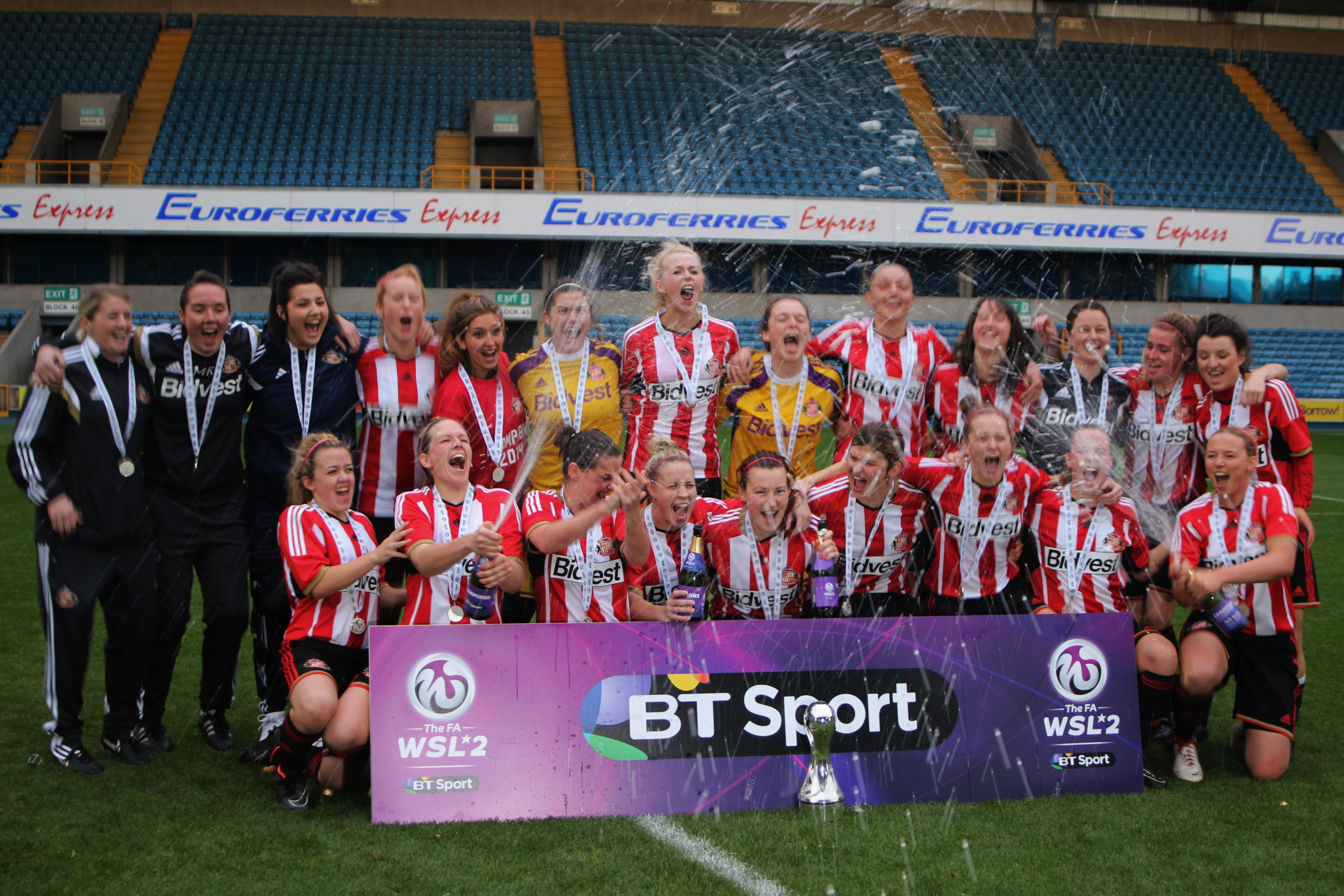
Sunderland celebrate winning the WSL 2 title in 2014

Bannon grew up in Whitley Bay playing football and was spotted by a Sunderland foundation coach, who asked her to sign for the club at the age of nine. Bannon subsequently successfully attended trials to enter Sunderland's Centre of Excellence (now known as Sunderland A.F.C. Women's Academy). From 7 to 13 years old, Bannon also played for Blyth Town F.C. After playing for Sunderland's reserve team for three years, she joined Sunderland A.F.C. Women's first team (then Sunderland A.F.C. Ladies) in 2002, when she was 14 years old, before going on to make her first team debut aged 15.

At the age of 18, Bannon was named club captain, a role she would go on to hold for over a decade until her retirement in 2017. She led the team to a historic appearance in the 2009 FA Women's Cup final against Arsenal W.F.C., which remains Sunderland's first and only appearance in the final of the Women's FA Cup to date. Sunderland had defeated Chelsea F.C. Women 3–0 at the Stadium of Light in the semi-final before facing the dominant Arsenal side at Pride Park Stadium.

Bannon captained Sunderland as they won three consecutive FA Women's Premier League National Division titles in 2010–11, 2011–12, and 2012–13. Thereafter, she guided the club to promotion to the FA Women's Super League (WSL) by winning the inaugural Women's Super League 2 title in 2014. During this period, Bannon was also named the WPL 2012–13 Player of the Year and Sunderland's 2012–13 joint player of the year with top scorer Beth Mead.

Over her career, Bannon made 211 recorded appearances for Sunderland. As of 2025, this makes Bannon one of only two players who have reached 200 appearances for Sunderland's women team, along with former teammate Keira Ramshaw.

== Retirement and legacy ==
After a 15-year playing career, at 28 years old, Bannon announced her retirement in June 2017 to concentrate on her career as a physical education (PE) teacher and to spend more time with family and friends. She balanced semi-professional football with her teaching duties at Unity City Academy in Middlesbrough throughout much of her career. Bannon has said that working as a teacher alongside playing football hindered both pursuits and left her exhausted and with no free time to relax or spend with those close to her.

In 2023, Sunderland inducted Bannon into their Hall of Fame, celebrating her 17-year association with the club, over 200 appearances, and her distinction as the only player to captain the women's team in an FA Cup final. Bannon is widely regarded as a "legend" of Sunderland's women team, known for her leadership, longevity, and loyalty to the club. Kevin Ball, a former captain of Sunderland's men's team, described Bannon as his female equivalent. Her generation of players created opportunities for future full-time professional players, including former teammate Beth Mead, who Bannon also helped to mentor as she transitioned to first-team football at Sunderland.
