= 2010–11 FA Women's Premier League =

FA Women's Premier League
- Season: 2010–11

The 2010–11 FA Women's Premier League season was the 20th season of the former top flight of English women's association football. This season the FA Women's Super League became the top level, superseding a reduced eight-team Premier League National Division.

Although there was no promotion to the FA Women's Super League until at least 2013, two teams were relegated into the Northern and Southern Divisions. The top two from each of these Divisions will then be promoted into a 10-team National Division for 2011-12.

== National Division ==
FA Women's Premier League National Division
- Season: 2010–11
- Champions: Sunderland
- Relegated: Blackburn Rovers; Millwall Lionesses
- Matches: 56
- Goals: 171 (3.05 per match)
- Top goalscorer: Sarah Wiltshire (11 goals)
- Biggest home win: Reading 5–1 Barnet (7 November 2010)
- Biggest away win: Watford 0–3 Leeds United (30 January 2011)
- Highest scoring: Blackburn Rovers 4–4 Watford (22 August 2010)

Locations of the FA Women's Premier League National Division teams
Locations of the FA Women's Premier League National Division Teams (Greater London)

Changes from last season:

- Arsenal were approved for FA WSL
- Everton were approved for FA WSL
- Chelsea were approved for FA WSL
- Doncaster Rovers Belles were approved for FA WSL
- Birmingham City were approved for FA WSL
- Bristol Academy were approved for FA WSL
- Barnet were promoted from the Southern Division
- Reading were promoted from the Southern Division

=== League table ===
Pos	Team	Pld	W	D	L	GF	GA	GD	Pts	Qualification or relegation
1	Sunderland (C)	14	9	3	2	30	16	+14	30	
2	Nottingham Forest	14	6	5	3	19	16	+3	23	
3	Reading	14	6	2	6	24	21	+3	20	
4	Leeds United	14	5	3	6	17	17	0	18	
5	Barnet	14	4	4	6	20	22	−2	16	
6	Watford	14	3	7	4	21	26	−5	16	
7	Blackburn Rovers (R)	14	4	4	6	18	24	−6	16	Relegation to the Northern Division
8	Millwall Lionesses (R)	14	3	4	7	22	29	−7	13	Relegation to the Southern Division

Updated to match(es) played on 17 May 2012. Source: FA WPL
Rules for classification: 1) points; 2) goal difference; 3) number of goals scored.
(C) Champions; (R) Relegated

=== Results ===
Home \ Away	BAR	BLR	LEU	MIL	NOF	REA	SUN	WAT
Barnet	—	0–0	3–0	3–1	0–0	1–2	1–0	5–2
Blackburn Rovers	2–1	—	2–0	2–2	1–3	0–2	0–2	4–4
Leeds United	1–1	3–1	—	1–1	0–1	3–0	1–3	0–0
Millwall Lionesses	2–1	1–3	1–2	—	2–2	0–3	2–3	2–2
Nottingham Forest	3–2	0–0	2–1	2–1	—	1–2	1–1	1–2
Reading	5–1	1–2	1–2	1–3	2–0	—	1–1	1–3
Sunderland	4–1	4–1	1–0	3–2	1–2	2–1	—	4–2
Watford	0–0	1–0	0–3	1–2	1–1	2–2	1–1	—

Source: FA WPL
Legend: Blue = home team win; Yellow = draw; Red = away team win.

== Top scorers ==
Rank	Player	Team	Goals
1.	Sarah Wiltshire	Watford	11
2=	Kelly McDougall	Sunderland	9
2=	Stacey Sowden	Barnet	9
4=	Catherine Lawson	Nottingham Forest	8
4=	Kate Longhurst	Millwall Lionesses	8

Last updated: 24 April 2011.
Source: http://full-time.thefa.com/StatLeaders.do?divisionseason=724561&league=872938

== Northern Division ==
FA Women's Premier League Northern Division
- Season: 2010–11
- Champions: Aston Villa
- Promoted: Aston Villa; Coventry City
- Relegated: Newcastle United; Curzon Ashton
- Matches: 90
- Goals: 341 (3.79 per match)
- Biggest home win: Leicester City 11–0 Rochdale (1 May 2011)
- Biggest away win: Leeds City Vixens 2–8 Leicester City (24 October 2010)

Map showing the locations of the teams in the Northern Division of the FA Women's Premier League
Map showing the locations of the teams in the Northern Division of the FA Women's Premier League

Changes from last season:

- Liverpool approved for WSL
- Lincoln City approved for WSL
- Coventry City promoted from the Midland Combination League
- Rochdale promoted from the Northern Combination League
- Sheffield Wednesday relegated to the Northern Combination League
- Luton Town relegated to the South East Combination League

=== League table ===
Pos	Team	Pld	W	D	L	GF	GA	GD	Pts	Promotion or relegation
1	Aston Villa (C, P)	18	14	0	4	40	18	+22	42	Promotion to the National Division
2	Coventry City (P)	18	13	2	3	45	22	+23	41	Promotion to the National Division
3	Leicester City	18	12	1	5	59	20	+39	37	
4	Manchester City	18	12	1	5	37	18	+19	37	
5	Derby County	18	8	3	7	27	28	−1	27	
6	Leeds City Vixens	18	5	2	11	31	46	−15	17	
7	Rochdale	18	5	1	12	36	57	−21	16	
8	Preston North End	18	4	3	11	22	46	−24	15	
9	Newcastle United (R)	18	4	3	11	22	48	−26	15	Relegation to Northern Combination League
10	Curzon Ashton (R)	18	3	4	11	22	38	−16	13	Relegation to Midland Combination League

Updated to match(es) played on 17 May 2012. Source: FA WPL
Rules for classification: 1) points; 2) goal difference; 3) number of goals scored.
(C) Champions; (P) Promoted; (R) Relegated

=== Results ===
Home \ Away	ASV	CVC	CUA	DEC	LCV	LEC	MCI	NEU	PNE	ROC
Aston Villa	—	0–2	1–0	3–0	2–1	1–0	2–1	5–1	4–0	4–1
Coventry City	0–1	—	2–1	0–5	4–1	2–1	2–1	2–2	3–0	5–2
Curzon Ashton	1–3	0–4	—	2–3	2–1	0–4	1–2	0–3	4–2	2–0
Derby County	1–0	0–1	0–0	—	1–2	1–6	1–0	1–2	1–2	3–2
Leeds City Vixens	4–0	2–3	2–2	3–0	—	2–8	0–4	0–1	4–2	0–1
Leicester City	2–3	1–1	2–0	1–2	6–0	—	1–2	1–0	5–1	11–0
Manchester City	2–1	3–1	3–2	1–1	0–3	1–2	—	4–0	2–0	3–1
Newcastle United	1–3	0–5	3–3	1–4	1–0	1–2	0–4	—	1–3	0–2
Preston North End	0–3	0–5	1–0	0–0	3–3	1–3	0–1	2–2	—	3–0
Rochdale	1–4	2–3	2–2	2–3	6–3	2–3	0–3	7–3	5–2	—

Source: FA WPL
Legend: Blue = home team win; Yellow = draw; Red = away team win.

== Southern Division ==
FA Women's Premier League Southern Division
- Season: 2010–11
- Champions: Charlton Athletic
- Promoted: Charlton Athletic; Cardiff City
- Relegated: Yeovil Town
- Matches: 90
- Goals: 242 (2.69 per match)
- Biggest away win: Portsmouth 0–5 Colchester United (24 October 2010)
- Highest scoring: West Ham United 4–5 Brighton & Hove Albion (7 November 2010)

Map showing the locations of the teams in the Southern Division of the FA Women's Premier League
Map showing the locations of the teams in the Southern Division of the FA Women's Premier League

Changes from last season:

- Barnet were promoted to the National Division
- Reading were promoted to the National Division
- Gillingham were promoted from the South East Combination League
- Yeovil Town were promoted from the South West Combination League
- Crystal Palace were relegated to the South East Combination League
- Fulham were relegated to the South East Combination League, but folded at the end of the season

=== League table ===
Pos	Team	Pld	W	D	L	GF	GA	GD	Pts	Promotion or relegation
1	Charlton Athletic (C, P)	18	11	3	4	30	12	+18	36	Promotion to the National Division
2	Cardiff City (P)	18	11	3	4	26	19	+7	36	Promotion to the National Division
3	West Ham United	18	10	3	5	29	17	+12	33	
4	Portsmouth	18	10	1	7	33	30	+3	31	
5	Keynsham Town	18	9	3	6	26	22	+4	30	
6	Colchester United	18	6	3	9	22	23	−1	21	
7	Brighton & Hove Albion	18	5	4	9	25	35	−10	19	
8	Queens Park Rangers	18	5	3	10	16	26	−10	18	
9	Gillingham	18	5	2	11	17	27	−10	17	
10	Yeovil Town (R)	18	3	5	10	18	31	−13	14	Relegation to the South West Combination League

Updated to match(es) played on 17 May 2012. Source: FA WPL
Rules for classification: 1) points; 2) goal difference; 3) number of goals scored.
(C) Champions; (P) Promoted; (R) Relegated

=== Results ===
Home \ Away	BHA	CAR	CHA	COU	GIL	KET	POR	QPR	WHU	YEO
Brighton & Hove Albion	—	1–1	1–4	1–3	0–2	0–2	5–1	2–0	1–1	2–1
Cardiff City	1–0	—	0–2	3–0	1–2	3–2	0–3	1–1	1–0	2–1
Charlton Athletic	2–0	1–2	—	0–2	0–1	2–2	0–1	1–0	3–0	2–1
Colchester United	1–1	1–2	0–1	—	1–0	1–1	1–2	0–2	0–4	4–1
Gillingham	3–1	0–3	1–3	0–2	—	1–2	2–2	3–0	0–2	0–1
Keynsham Town	2–1	0–2	0–3	1–0	2–1	—	1–3	0–1	0–0	3–1
Portsmouth	5–1	0–1	0–1	0–5	3–1	3–1	—	3–2	0–1	4–2
Queens Park Rangers	1–2	0–1	0–0	2–1	2–0	0–4	3–0	—	0–3	0–2
West Ham United	4–5	4–1	1–1	2–0	2–0	0–2	0–2	1–0	—	2–0
Yeovil Town	1–1	1–1	0–4	0–0	0–0	0–1	3–1	2–2	1–2	—

Source: FA WPL
Legend: Blue = home team win; Yellow = draw; Red = away team win.

== See also ==
- National League
- Northern Division
- Southern Division
