= List of Women's Super League clubs =

The following is a list of every club which has competed in the Women's Super League - the highest level of women's football in England - since its inception in 2011. All statistics here refer to time in the WSL only (excludes Spring Series), with the exception of 'most recent finish' (which refers to all levels of play) and 'last promotion' (which refers to the club's last promotion from a lower tier). For the 'top scorer' and 'most appearances' columns, those in bold still play in the WSL for the club shown. WSL teams playing in the 2026–27 season are indicated in bold, while founding members are shown in italics. If the highest finish is that of the most recent season, then this is also shown in bold.

As of the start of the 2026–27 season, two teams - Arsenal and Chelsea - have competed in every WSL season since 2011.

Club	Location	Seasons	Total seasons	Seasons won	Last promotion	Last relegation	Most recent finish	Highest finish	Top scorer	Most appearances
**Arsenal**	Borehamwood	**2011–**	16	2011; 2012; 2018–19	1992	Never relegated	2nd	1st	Vivianne Miedema (80)	**Leah Williamson** (161)
**Aston Villa**	Walsall	**2020–**	7	–	2020	Never relegated	9th	5th	**Rachel Daly** (41)	Sarah Mayling (83)
**Birmingham City**	Birmingham	2011–2022, **2026–**	12	–	2026	2022	WSL 2 (1st)	2nd	Rachel Williams (24)	Kerys Harrop (128)
**Brighton and Hove Albion**	Crawley	**2018–**	9	–	2018	Never relegated	7th	5th	Elisabeth Terland (20)	Kayleigh Green (87)
Bristol City (Note: Originally joined the league as Bristol Academy in 2011, renamed Bristol City in 2016.)	Bristol	2011–2015; 2017–2021; 2023–2024	10	–	2023	2024	WSL 2 (4th)	2nd	Natalia Pablos (12)	Loren Dykes (99)
**Charlton Athletic**	New Eltham	**2026-**	1	–	2026	Never relegated	WSL 2 (3rd)	–	N/A	N/A
**Chelsea**	Kingston upon Thames	**2011–**	16	2015; 2017–18; 2019–20; 2020–21; 2021–22; 2022–23; 2023–24; 2024–25	2005	Never relegated	3rd	1st	Sam Kerr (65)	Millie Bright (184)
**Crystal Palace**	Sutton	2024–2025, **2026–**	2	–	2026	2025	WSL 2 (2nd)	12th	**Annabel Blanchard**, Katie Stengel (4)	**Ashleigh Weerden** (22)
Doncaster Rover Belles	Doncaster	2011–2013; 2016	4	–	2015	2016	WNL D1 North (11th - relegated)	7th	Leandra Little, Aine O'Gorman (4)	Kasia Lipka (54)
**Everton**	Liverpool	2011–2014 **2017–**	14	–	2017	2014	8th	3rd	Toni Duggan (19)	**Megan Finnigan** (132)
Leicester City	Leicester	2021–2026	5	–	2021	2026	12th (relegated after playoff)	**10th**	Shannon O'Brien (12)	Sam Tierney (103)
**Liverpool**	St Helens	2011–2020; **2022–**	14	2013; 2014	2021	2020	11th	1st	Natasha Dowie (21)	Gemma Bonner (140)
**London City Lionesses**	Bromley	**2025–**	2	–	2024	Never relegated	6th	**6th**	**Elene Lete (22)**	**Freya Godfrey (6)**
**Manchester City**	Manchester	**2014–**	13	2016; 2025–26	2013	Never relegated	1st	**1st**	**Khadija Shaw** (62)	Steph Houghton (138)
**Manchester United**	Leigh	**2019–**	8	–	2019	Never relegated	4th	2nd	**Ella Toone** (48)	**Ella Toone** (133)
Notts County (Note: Originally joined the league as Lincoln Ladies in 2011, relocated as Notts County in 2014.)	Nottingham	2011–2016	6	–	2010	Never relegated	Dissolved (2017)	4th	Jessica Clarke (24)	Jessica Clarke (82)
Reading	Reading	2016–2023	7	–	2015	2023	Southern Region Women's Football League (5th)	4th	Fara Williams (26)	Rachel Rowe (98)
Sunderland	Hetton-le-Hole	2015–2018	3	–	2014	2018	Women's Super League 2 (8th)	3rd	Beth Mead (18)	Victoria Williams (44)
**Tottenham Hotspur**	Leyton	**2019–**	8	–	2019	Never relegated	5th	**5th**	Bethany England (32)	Ashleigh Neville (115)
**West Ham United**	Dagenham	**2018–**	9	–	2018	Never relegated	10th	6th	**Viviane Asseyi** (23)	Kate Longhurst (93)
Yeovil Town (Note: Competed in the WSL as Yeovil Town (2017–19), renamed Bridgwater United in 2021.)	Bridgwater	2017–2019	2	–	2016	2019	WNL D1 South West (3rd - as Bridgwater United)	9th	Ann-Marie Heatherson, Ellie Mason (3)	Megan Walsh (38)

Notes:

In addition, the following teams were members of the 2009–10 FA Women's Premier League - its final season as the national top division - but have never competed in WSL (teams listed in italics are members of the second-tier Women's Championship for the 2024–25 season):

- Blackburn Rovers
- Leeds United (as Leeds Carnegie)
- Millwall
- Nottingham Forest
- Watford
