= WSL Football =

Association football league in England

- Founded: 28 November 2023; 2 years ago
- Country: England (14 teams WSL, 12 teams WSL2)
- Confederation: UEFA
- Divisions: Women's Super League; Women's Super League 2
- Number of clubs: 24
- Level on pyramid: 1–2
- Promotion to: None
- Relegation to: Women's National League
- Domestic cup: Women's FA Cup
- League cup: WSL Players Cup
- Current champions: Chelsea (2024–25)
- Broadcaster(s): Sky Sports; BBC Sport
- Website: wslfootball.com
- Current: 2026–27 Women's Super League

Women's Super League Football, commonly known as WSL Football, is a private limited company responsible for operating the top two professional divisions of women's football in England: the Women's Super League and Women's Super League 2. Established in November 2023 under the provisional name NewCo, the company officially began managing the competitions as Women's Professional Leagues Limited (WPLL) starting with the 2024–25 season.

The company rebranded to WSL Football ahead of the 2025–26 season as part of an effort to unify the women's game under a single identity and increase its commercial visibility.

The two divisions managed by WSL Football contain 12 clubs each, with promotion and relegation links to the third tier, the Women's National League. Domestic cup competitions operated alongside the league include the Women's FA Cup and the FA Women's League Cup.

The organisation's main office is located in London, with operations aimed at commercial growth, broadcasting deals, and the continued professionalisation of the women's game.

== Personnel ==
Nikki Doucet serves as WSL Football's chief executive officer.

== See also ==
- Ligue féminine de football professionnel
