= 2012–13 FA Women's Premier League =

FA Women's Premier League
- Season: 2012–13

The 2012–13 FA Women's Premier League season was the 22nd season of the former top flight of English women's association football.

== National Division ==
FA Women's Premier League National Division
- Season: 2012–13
- Champions: Sunderland
- Promoted: Sunderland (WSL 2); Watford (WSL 2); Manchester City (WSL 1); Aston Villa (WSL 2); Barnet (WSL 2)
- Relegated: Leeds United; Coventry City; Charlton Athletic; Cardiff City; Portsmouth
- Matches: 90
- Goals: 273 (3.03 per match)
- Highest scoring: Charlton Athletic 7–2 Portsmouth (30 September 2012)
- Longest winless run: Barnet (18)

Locations of the FA Women's Premier League National Division teams
Locations of the FA Women's Premier League National Division Teams (Greater London)

Changes from last season:

- Manchester City were promoted to the National Division
- Portsmouth were promoted to the National Division
- Nottingham Forest were relegated to the Northern Division
- Reading were relegated to the Southern Division

=== League table ===
Pos	Team	Pld	W	D	L	GF	GA	GD	Pts	Promotion or relegation
1	Sunderland (C, P)	18	14	3	1	54	16	+38	45	Approved for FA WSL 2
2	Watford (P)	18	11	5	2	32	17	+15	38	Approved for FA WSL 2
3	Leeds United (R)	18	12	2	4	32	19	+13	38	Relegation to the Northern Division
4	Manchester City (P)	18	7	4	7	32	25	+7	25	Approved for FA WSL 1
5	Coventry City (R)	18	8	1	9	25	27	−2	25	Relegation to the Southern Division
6	Aston Villa (P)	18	7	3	8	21	29	−8	24	Approved for FA WSL 2
7	Charlton Athletic (R)	18	6	4	8	25	31	−6	22	Relegation to the Southern Division
8	Cardiff City (R)	18	5	4	9	23	26	−3	19	Relegation to the Southern Division
9	Portsmouth (R)	18	3	4	11	22	44	−22	13	Relegation to the Southern Division
10	Barnet (P)	18	0	4	14	7	39	−32	4	Approved for FA WSL 2

Source: FA WPL
(C) Champions; (P) Promoted; (R) Relegated

=== Results ===
Home \ Away	AST	BRT	CAR	CHA	COV	LEE	MCI	POR	SUN	WAT
Aston Villa	—	3–0	0–4	2–1	1–4	1–1	1–0	2–0	0–3	1–2
Barnet	0–2	—	0–0	0–2	0–2	1–4	0–3	2–2	0–1	0–1
Cardiff City	1–1	0–0	—	0–1	0–2	0–1	3–2	2–0	0–4	1–2
Charlton Athletic	1–0	1–1	0–4	—	0–1	2–3	4–4	7–2	2–1	1–1
Coventry City	1–3	3–2	2–1	2–0	—	1–2	0–3	2–2	1–4	0–2
Leeds United	1–2	2–0	1–2	2–0	1–0	—	2–1	3–0	1–1	3–0
Manchester City	1–1	1–0	3–1	1–2	2–1	3–0	—	2–3	2–3	1–1
Portsmouth	3–0	2–1	3–3	0–0	0–1	1–2	1–2	—	1–4	1–2
Sunderland	2–1	7–0	2–0	4–1	3–2	3–1	1–0	7–0	—	2–2
Watford	4–0	3–0	2–1	3–0	1–0	1–2	1–1	2–1	2–2	—

Source: FA WPL
Legend: Blue = home team win; Yellow = draw; Red = away team win.

== Northern Division ==
FA Women's Premier League Northern Division
- Season: 2012–13
- Champions: Sheffield
- Relegated: Leicester City
- Matches: 72
- Goals: 264 (3.67 per match)
- Highest scoring: Preston North End 4–4 Blackburn Rovers (9 September 2012)

Map showing the locations of the teams in the Northern Division of the FA Women's Premier League
Map showing the locations of the teams in the Northern Division of the FA Women's Premier League

Changes from last season:

- Manchester City were promoted to the National Division
- Newcastle United were promoted from the Northern Combination League
- Wolverhampton Wanderers were promoted from the Midland Combination League
- Leeds City Vixens were relegated to the Northern Combination League
- Rotherham United were relegated to the Midland Combination League
- Rochdale resigned at the end of the season

=== League table ===
Pos	Team	Pld	W	D	L	GF	GA	GD	Pts	Promotion or relegation
1	Sheffield (C)	16	13	2	1	46	16	+30	41	
2	Nottingham Forest	16	10	2	4	35	22	+13	32	
3	Blackburn Rovers	16	9	3	4	35	25	+10	30	
4	Sporting Club Albion	16	8	3	5	40	24	+16	27	
5	Preston North End	16	7	4	5	29	27	+2	25	
6	Newcastle United	16	6	2	8	31	39	−8	20	
7	Wolverhampton Wanderers	16	5	1	10	20	40	−20	16	
8	Derby County	16	4	0	12	28	43	−15	12	
9	Leicester City (R)	16	1	1	14	14	42	−28	4	Relegation to the Midland Combination League

Source: FA WPL
(C) Champions; (R) Relegated

=== Results ===
Home \ Away	BLB	DER	LEI	NEW	NOT	PNE	SCA	SHE	WOL
Blackburn Rovers	—	5–1	2–0	1–1	1–3	2–1	0–2	3–1	4–1
Derby County	2–3	—	2–1	3–1	1–4	1–2	2–3	0–4	1–2
Leicester City	1–2	0–4	—	2–5	0–3	1–2	0–3	0–2	0–3
Newcastle United	0–2	2–4	5–1	—	2–3	2–0	1–4	0–4	5–1
Nottingham Forest	3–2	3–0	2–1	2–3	—	3–2	3–2	0–2	1–1
Preston North End	4–4	3–2	2–2	3–0	1–0	—	3–3	2–2	2–1
Sporting Club Albion	1–1	4–2	2–4	6–0	0–0	0–1	—	2–4	4–0
Sheffield	4–0	3–1	2–1	3–3	2–1	2–0	3–0	—	5–1
Wolverhampton Wanderers	0–3	3–2	1–0	0–1	2–4	2–1	0–4	2–3	—

Source: FA WPL
Legend: Blue = home team win; Yellow = draw; Red = away team win.

== Southern Division ==
FA Women's Premier League Southern Division
- Season: 2012–13
- Champions: Reading
- Promoted: Reading; Millwall Lionesses; Yeovil Town
- Relegated: Queens Park Rangers
- Biggest home win: Reading 8–0 Queens Park Rangers (28 October 2012)
- Biggest away win: Queens Park Rangers 1–7 Gillingham (19 August 2012)

Map showing the locations of the teams in the Southern Division of the FA Women's Premier League
Map showing the locations of the teams in the Southern Division of the FA Women's Premier League

Changes from last season:

- Portsmouth were promoted to the National Division
- Lewes were promoted from the South East Combination League
- Yeovil Town were promoted from the South West Combination League
- Reading were relegated from the National Division
- Plymouth Argyle were relegated to the South West Combination League
- Keynsham Town were relegated to the South West Combination League

=== League table ===
Pos	Team	Pld	W	D	L	GF	GA	GD	Pts	Promotion or relegation
1	Reading (C, P)	18	15	0	3	57	16	+41	45	Approved for FA WSL 2
2	Millwall Lionesses (P)	18	12	1	5	25	18	+7	37	Approved for FA WSL 2
3	Yeovil Town (P)	18	9	3	6	29	17	+12	30	Approved for FA WSL 2
4	Brighton & Hove Albion	18	8	4	6	32	30	+2	28	
5	Lewes	18	7	2	9	23	24	−1	23	
6	West Ham United	17	6	4	7	20	18	+2	22	
7	Gillingham	18	5	4	9	19	29	−10	19	
8	Tottenham Hotspur	17	4	4	9	22	33	−11	16	
9	Colchester United (R)	16	3	7	6	17	30	−13	16	Club folded at the end of the season
10	Queens Park Rangers (R)	18	2	5	11	14	43	−29	11	Relegation to the South East Combination League

Source: FA WPL
(C) Champions; (P) Promoted; (R) Relegated

=== Results ===
Home \ Away	BHA	COL	GIL	LEW	MIL	QPR	REA	TOT	WHU	YEO
Brighton & Hove Albion	—	4–3	2–2	1–0	0–1	2–2	4–3	4–0	3–2	0–4
Colchester United	1–1	—	1–0	2–1	0–2	1–1	1–0	P–P	P–P	0–0
Gillingham	1–0	0–0	—	1–0	0–2	1–2	1–2	1–0	0–2	1–1
Lewes	1–3	4–0	3–0	—	0–1	2–1	3–2	1–4	3–0	1–0
Millwall Lionesses	1–5	5–2	0–2	2–1	—	2–0	0–2	2–0	1–0	2–1
Queens Park Rangers	1–3	2–2	1–7	0–1	0–1	—	0–4	2–2	0–2	1–0
Reading	4–0	5–1	7–0	4–0	3–0	8–0	—	3–1	3–2	2–1
Tottenham Hotspur	2–1	1–1	1–0	2–2	1–3	2–0	1–2	—	0–1	1–3
West Ham United	2–0	1–1	2–2	1–0	0–0	1–1	1–2	3–0	—	0–1
Yeovil Town	1–2	3–1	3–0	3–1	1–0	2–0	0–1	4–4	1–0	—

Source: FA WPL
Legend: Blue = home team win; Yellow = draw; Red = away team win.
