= FA Women's National League =

- Founded: 1991; 35 years ago
- First season: 1991–92
- Country: England
- Confederation: UEFA
- Divisions: 6 (format)
- Level on pyramid: 3–4
- Promotion to: Women's Super League 2
- Relegation to: Regional leagues
- Domestic cup: Women's FA Cup
- League cup(s): National League Cup; National League Plate
- Most championships: Arsenal (12 titles)
- Website: thefa.com/wpl
- Current: 2026–27 National League

The FA Women's National League is a group of six football divisions which sit at the third and fourth tiers of women's football in England. Founded in 1991 as the WFA National League, the league was run by the Women's Football Association, before control was handed to the Football Association in 1994, and the name changed to FA Women's Premier League.

The league consisted of the National Division, England's top division until 2010, and the Northern and Southern Premier Divisions, which formed the second tier. The league operated a system of promotion and relegation, with the bottom two teams of the National Division relegated, and the winners of the Northern and Southern Divisions promoted. With the introduction of the Women's Super League, the National Division became the second tier, while the Northern and Southern Divisions became the third.

The National Division was replaced in 2013 by the Championship, with the Northern and Southern Divisions continuing at the third tier. In 2014 the fourth tier Combination Leagues became part of the FA Women's Premier League, and were rebranded as the Division One North, Midlands, South East, and South West. The league received its current name and branding in 2018.

Arsenal hold the record for most titles won, with twelve. The current 2025–26 National League champions are Burnley (North, 1st title) and Watford (South, 2nd title).

== History ==
Before the National League, women's teams nationally had competed in the WFA Cup (Women's FA Cup) since 1970, and there were English regional leagues, but this was the first regular nationwide competition of its kind.

The Women's National League was inaugurated in the 1991–92 season by the Women's Football Association (WFA), with a monetary grant from the Sports Council. Eight teams played in the top flight in that year. From the League's foundation, it consisted of a national premier division and two lower divisions, the Northern and Southern Divisions, whose winners each season were promoted to the top flight.

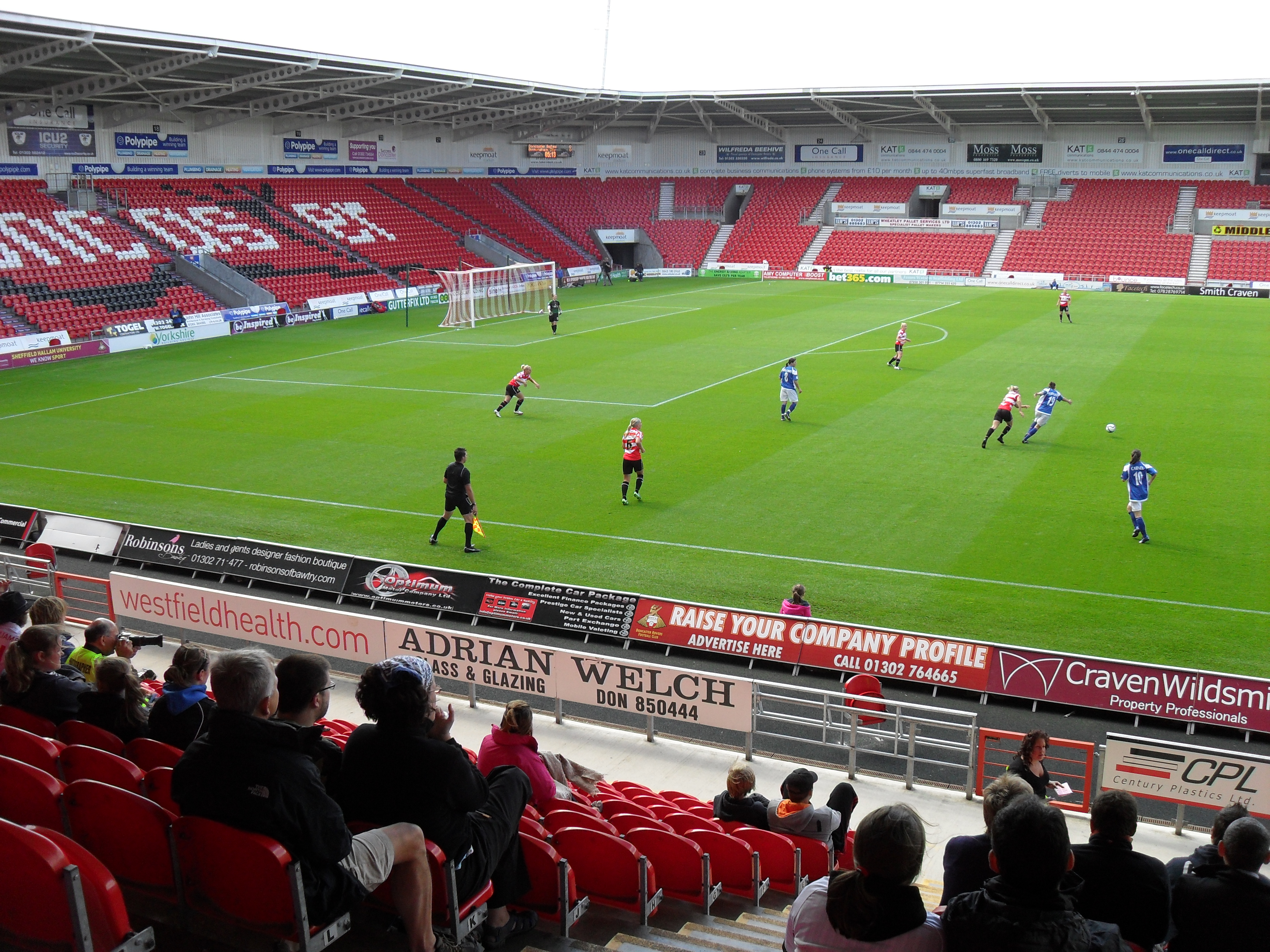
Doncaster Belles were the first champions of the Women's National League in 1991–92

From 1991–92 until 2012–13, the national premier division was above the Northern and Southern Divisions. Since 1991–92, the Northern and Southern Divisions have run on an equal basis with promotion, and this continues today. The terms Women's Premiership and Ladies Premiership were generally used for the National Division only.

After the League's third season, the FA assumed responsibility for the competition and renamed it, beginning with the 1994–95 FA Women's Premier League (FA WPL).

The Women's Premier League remained level 1 and 2 of women's football until the end of the 2009–10 season. From 2000 until 2008, the WPL champions competed in the annual FA Women's Community Shield.

The National Division's most successful clubs were Arsenal (12 titles), Croydon (3 titles), Doncaster Belles (2 titles and 7 times runners-up), Everton (1 title and 5 times runners-up), and Sunderland (3 titles at league level 2).

The Women's Premier League lost several clubs prior to the 2010–11 season and the National Division was demoted to level 2, due to the creation of the FA WSL in 2011. (The WSL was a summer league for its first six years, as opposed to the WPL's winter format.) Strangely, the lower divisions were still given the name "Premier League" for eight more seasons. The number of clubs competing in the Northern and Southern Divisions decreased from 12 to 10. The National Division decreased from 12 clubs to eight (2010–11), then increased to 10 clubs (2011–12 and 2012–13).

The National Division was scrapped after the 2012–13 season, due to the introduction of the WSL 2 in 2014, which included some clubs that moved from the Women's Premier League. During the 2013–14 season, the only divisions with WPL branding were the third tier Northern and Southern Divisions. The FA proposed rebranding the WPL collectively as the Women's Championship League, but the idea was ultimately dropped. In 2014 the league moved away from the FA with the formation of an independent League Management Committee, elected by the clubs to run league operations. Carol West, a serving police officer was elected as league chair and led the voluntary management committee until 2023.

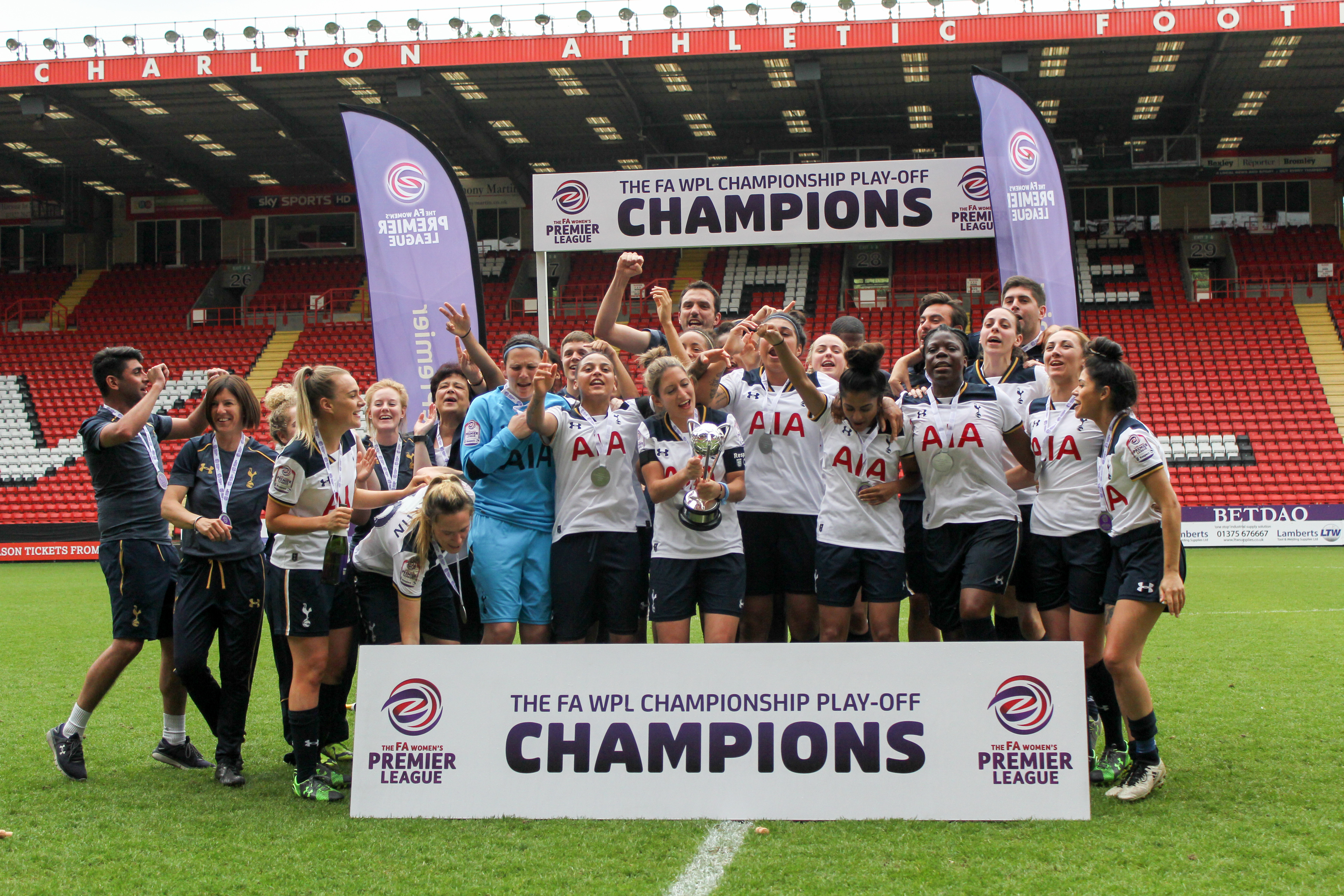
Tottenham Hotspur won the 2016–17 Southern Division and promotion play-off

For the 2014–15 season, the Women's Premier League incorporated the fourth tier Combination Leagues as the Premier League's 'Division One', consisting of the Division One leagues: North, Midlands, South East and South West. Promotion to the second tier was also reintroduced, with the winners of the Northern and Southern Divisions playing each other in a single play-off match at a neutral venue, the winner becoming the overall Women's Premier League/National League champion, and promoted to the WSL 2. The first play-off occurred between Portsmouth and Sheffield at Stratford Town's Knights Lane ground. Sheffield won through a stoppage-time goal.

In 2018 the FA Women's Premier League was rebranded as the FA Women's National League. Beginning with the 2023–24 season, it was decided that both the Northern and Southern Division champions will be automatically promoted to the Championship.

== Format and clubs ==
=== Format ===
The National League consists of six divisions, forming the third and fourth tiers of women's football in England. The National League North and National League South, sit at the third tier, while Division One North, Midlands, South East, and South West, form the fourth tier.

=== Current clubs ===
The following clubs are competing in the 2026–27 season.

National League North	National League South
Boldmere St. Michaels; Derby County; Huddersfield Town; Hull City; Liverpool Feds; Loughborough Lightning; Middlesbrough; Norwich City; Peterborough United; Rugby Borough; Stoke City; West Bromwich Albion	AFC Bournemouth; AFC Wimbledon; Cheltenham Town; Exeter City; Fulham; Hashtag United; Lewes; Oxford United; Plymouth Argyle; Portsmouth; Real Bedford; Swindon Town

Division One North	Division One Midlands	Division One South East	Division One South West
AFC Fylde; Blackburn Rovers; Bradford City; Chester-le-Street Town; Chorley; Durham Cestria; Halifax; Leeds United; Norton & Stockton Ancients; Stockport County; Thornaby; York City	Barnsley Women; Chesterfield; Kidderminster Harriers; Leafield Athletic; Lye Town; Northampton Town; Notts County; Sheffield; Sporting Khalsa; Sutton Coldfield Town; Worcester City; Wythenshawe	Actonians; Billericay Town; Cambridge United; Chatham Town; Dartford; Dulwich Hamlet; London Bees; Luton Town; Milton Keynes Dons; Queens Park Rangers; Saltdean United; Stevenage	Abingdon United; Ascot United; Bournemouth Sports; Bridgwater United; Bristol Rovers; Gwalia United; Keynsham Town; Maidenhead United; Marine Academy Plymouth; Moneyfields; Torquay United; Wycombe Wanderers

== Winners ==
=== National Division champions ===
Below is a list of women's Premier League / National Division champions at level one from 1991 to 2010, followed by National Division champions at level two.

Level 1 national champions:

Season	Champions (number of titles)	Runners-up	Third place
1991–92	**Doncaster Belles**	Red Star Southampton	Wimbledon
1992–93	**Arsenal**	Doncaster Belles	Knowsley United
1993–94	**Doncaster Belles** (2)	Arsenal	Knowsley United
1994–95	**Arsenal** (2)	Liverpool	Doncaster Belles
1995–96	**Croydon**	Doncaster Belles	Arsenal
1996–97	**Arsenal** (3)	Doncaster Belles	Croydon
1997–98	**Everton**	Arsenal	Doncaster Belles
1998–99	**Croydon** (2)	Arsenal	Doncaster Belles
1999–2000	**Croydon** (3)	Doncaster Belles	Arsenal
2000–01	**Arsenal** (4)	Doncaster Belles	Charlton Athletic
2001–02	**Arsenal** (5)	Doncaster Belles	Charlton Athletic
2002–03	**Fulham**	Doncaster Belles	Arsenal
2003–04	**Arsenal** (6)	Charlton Athletic	Fulham
2004–05	**Arsenal** (7)	Charlton Athletic	Everton
2005–06	**Arsenal** (8)	Everton	Charlton Athletic
2006–07	**Arsenal** (9)	Everton	Charlton Athletic
2007–08	**Arsenal** (10)	Everton	Leeds United
2008–09	**Arsenal** (11)	Everton	Chelsea
2009–10	**Arsenal** (12)	Everton	Chelsea

Level 2 national champions:

Season	Champions (number of titles)	Runners-up	Third place
2010–11	**Sunderland**	Nottingham Forest	Reading
2011–12	**Sunderland** (2)	Leeds United	Aston Villa
2012–13	**Sunderland** (3)	Watford	Leeds United

=== Northern and Southern Division champions ===
Level 2 champions:

Season	Northern Division	Southern Division
1991–92	Bronte	Arsenal
1992–93	Aston Villa	District Line
1993–94	Wolverhampton Wanderers	Bromley Borough
1994–95	Aston Villa	Maidstone Tigresses
1995–96	Tranmere Rovers	Southampton Saints
1996–97	Bradford City	Berkhamsted
1997–98	Ilkeston Town	Southampton Saints
1998–99	Aston Villa	Reading Royals
1999–2000	Sunderland	Barry Town
2000–01	Leeds United	Brighton & Hove Albion
2001–02	Birmingham City	Fulham
2002–03	Aston Villa	Bristol Rovers
2003–04	Liverpool	Bristol City
2004–05	Sunderland	Chelsea
2005–06	Blackburn Rovers	Cardiff City
2006–07	Liverpool	Watford
2007–08	Nottingham Forest	Fulham
2008–09	Sunderland	Millwall
2009–10	Liverpool	Barnet

Level 3 champions:

Automatic promotion ended in 2012–13. From 2014–15 to 2022–23, the club marked in bold won the league championship play-off between the Northern and Southern Division winners, and promotion to the Championship.
From 2023–24 onwards both the winners of the Northern Premier and the Southern Premier are promoted to the Championship.

Season	Northern Division	Southern Division
2010–11 (Note: 2011: Promotion of both champions and runners-up Coventry City and Cardiff City to National Division, after WSL's formation)	Aston Villa	Charlton Athletic
2011–12 (Note: 2012: Promotion of both champions to National Division)	Manchester City	Portsmouth
2012–13 (Note: 2013: National Division ended. Reading, Millwall and Yeovil were elected to WSL 2)	Sheffield	Reading
2013–14	Sheffield	Coventry City
2014–15	**Sheffield**	Portsmouth
2015–16	Sporting Club Albion	**Brighton & Hove Albion**
2016–17	Blackburn Rovers	**Tottenham Hotspur**
2017–18 (Note: 2018: West Ham United awarded FA WSL licence; Charlton, Leicester City, Crystal Palace and Lewes promoted to Championship)	Blackburn Rovers	**Charlton Athletic**
2018–19 (Note: 2019: Promotion of both champions to Championship, as FA WSL increased to 12 clubs)	**Blackburn Rovers**	Coventry United
2019–20	Not awarded (COVID-19 pandemic)	
2020–21	Not awarded (COVID-19 pandemic)	
2021–22	Wolverhampton Wanderers	**Southampton**
2022–23	Nottingham Forest	**Watford**
2023–24	Newcastle	Portsmouth
2024–25	Nottingham Forest	Ipswich Town
2025–26	Burnley	Watford

=== Division One champions ===
Following the incorporation of the Combination Leagues in 2014, the Women's Premier League / National League consisted of an additional four regional leagues below the Northern and Southern Divisions.

Level 4 champions:

Season	Division One North	Division One Midlands	Division One South East	Division One South West
2014–15	Guiseley Vixens	Loughborough Foxes	C & K Basildon	Forest Green Rovers
2015–16	Middlesbrough	Leicester City	Crystal Palace	Swindon Town
2016–17	Guiseley Vixens	Wolverhampton Wanderers	Gillingham	Chichester City
2017–18	Hull City	Loughborough Foxes	Milton Keynes Dons	Plymouth Argyle
2018–19	Burnley	West Bromwich Albion	Crawley Wasps	Keynsham Town
2019–20	Not awarded (COVID-19 pandemic)			
2020–21	Not awarded (COVID-19 pandemic)			
2021–22	Liverpool Feds	Boldmere St. Michaels	Billericay Town	Cheltenham Town
2022–23	Newcastle United	Stourbridge	Hashtag United	Cardiff City Ladies
2023–24	Hull City	Sporting Khalsa	AFC Wimbledon	Exeter City
2024–25	Middlesbrough	Loughborough Lightning	Real Bedford	AFC Bournemouth
2025–26	Huddersfield Town	Peterborough United	Fulham	Swindon Town

== Cup competitions ==
The main cup competition of the National League is the FA Women's National League Cup, a knock-out competition involving all of the teams within the League's six divisions. Due to the changing structure of women's football, this competition has historically varied from a straight knock-out competition to a competition with a preliminary group stage before reaching the knock-out stage. The first Cup-winners were Arsenal in the 1991–92 WFA Women's National League Cup. The first winners of a Cup without top-flight teams were Barnet F.C. Ladies in the 2010–11 FA Women's Premier League Cup.

The FA Women's National League Plate was introduced in the 2014–15 season (as the Women's Premier League Plate). Under the current format, the teams that are eliminated from the opening round of the League Cup are entered into the Plate.

== Sponsorship ==
The league's sponsors have included Axa (1998–2002), Nationwide Building Society (2002–2007), and Tesco (2007–2010). The league currently has no sponsorship deal.

== See also ==
- FA Women's Premier League National Division
- FA Women's National League Cup
