= 2011–12 FA Women's Premier League =

FA Women's Premier League
- Season: 2011–12

The 2011–12 FA Women's Premier League season was the 21st season of the former top flight of English women's association football. The league grew to ten teams this season, with two teams being relegated and four being promoted from the Northern and Southern divisions.

== National Division ==
FA Women's Premier League National Division
- Season: 2011–12
- Champions: Sunderland
- Relegated: Reading; Nottingham Forest
- Matches: 90
- Goals: 255 (2.83 per match)
- Highest scoring: Watford 2–8 Sunderland (28 August 2011)

Locations of the FA Women's Premier League National Division teams
Locations of the FA Women's Premier League National Division Teams (Greater London)

Changes from last season:

- Aston Villa were promoted from the Northern Division
- Coventry City were promoted from the Northern Division
- Charlton Athletic were promoted from the Southern Division
- Cardiff City were promoted from the Southern Division
- Blackburn Rovers were relegated to the Northern Division
- Millwall Lionesses were relegated to the Southern Division

=== League table ===
Pos	Team	Pld	W	D	L	GF	GA	GD	Pts	Qualification or relegation
1	Sunderland (C)	18	13	3	2	49	18	+31	42	
2	Leeds United	18	13	2	3	36	10	+26	41	
3	Aston Villa	18	7	6	5	24	21	+3	27	
4	Barnet	18	7	5	6	30	21	+9	26	
5	Charlton Athletic	18	7	5	6	24	23	+1	26	
6	Coventry City	18	7	5	6	19	19	0	26	
7	Watford	18	5	2	11	16	39	−23	17	
8	Cardiff City	18	4	4	10	11	19	−8	16	
9	Reading (R)	18	5	1	12	25	43	−18	16	Relegation to the Southern Division
10	Nottingham Forest (R)	18	4	3	11	21	42	−21	15	Relegation to the Northern Division

Updated to match(es) played on 17 May 2012. Source: FA WPL
Rules for classification: 1) points; 2) goal difference; 3) number of goals scored.
(C) Champions; (R) Relegated

=== Results ===
Teams play each other twice, once at home, once away

Home \ Away	AST	BAR	CAR	CHA	COV	LEE	NOT	REA	SUN	WAT
Aston Villa	—	0–0	0–0	1–1	0–2	1–4	1–2	1–0	0–0	4–0
Barnet	4–0	—	1–0	2–2	3–0	0–1	4–2	5–1	1–4	4–0
Cardiff City	0–0	1–2	—	0–1	0–2	0–2	1–2	3–0	1–2	1–0
Charlton Athletic	0–3	0–0	2–0	—	0–2	0–2	4–1	1–1	0–2	2–0
Coventry City	0–2	1–1	0–0	1–0	—	0–1	2–4	1–0	3–1	1–3
Leeds United	5–0	2–2	2–0	3–0	0–1	—	1–1	3–2	0–1	2–0
Nottingham Forest	1–2	3–0	0–0	0–3	1–1	0–2	—	1–3	0–2	1–2
Reading	0–6	1–0	0–2	3–5	1–0	0–3	6–1	—	0–1	1–3
Sunderland	1–2	2–1	2–0	2–2	2–2	2–0	6–1	6–3	—	5–0
Watford	1–1	1–0	1–2	0–1	0–0	0–3	2–0	1–3	2–8	—

Updated to match(es) played on 17 May 2012. Source: FA WPL
Legend: Blue = home team win; Yellow = draw; Red = away team win.

== Northern Division ==
FA Women's Premier League Northern Division
- Season: 2011–12
- Champions: Manchester City
- Promoted: Manchester City
- Relegated: Rotherham United; Leeds City Vixens
- Matches: 90
- Goals: 373 (4.14 per match)
- Biggest home win: Manchester City 11–0 Leeds City Vixens (9 October 2011)
- Biggest away win: Leeds City Vixens 1–11 Blackburn Rovers (15 April 2012)
- Longest winless run: Leeds City Vixens (18)

Map showing the locations of the teams in the Northern Division of the FA Women's Premier League
Map showing the locations of the teams in the Northern Division of the FA Women's Premier League

Changes from last season:

- Aston Villa were promoted to the National Division
- Coventry City were promoted to the National Division
- Sheffield were promoted from the Northern Combination League
- Rotherham United were promoted from the Northern Combination League
- Sporting Club Albion were promoted from the Midland Combination league
- Blackburn Rovers were relegated to the Northern Division
- Newcastle United were relegated to the Northern Combination League
- Curzon Ashton were relegated to the Midland Combination League

=== League table ===
Pos	Team	Pld	W	D	L	GF	GA	GD	Pts	Promotion or relegation
1	Manchester City (C, P)	18	13	1	4	58	19	+39	40	Promoted to National Division
2	Sheffield	18	11	2	5	46	28	+18	35	
3	Leicester City	18	10	4	4	43	21	+22	34	
4	Blackburn Rovers	18	9	5	4	48	28	+20	32	
5	Derby County	18	9	5	4	44	30	+14	32	
6	Sporting Club Albion	18	8	5	5	39	26	+13	29	
7	Preston North End	18	7	3	8	30	30	0	24	
8	Rochdale	18	4	3	11	26	40	−14	15	Club resigned from the league at the end of the season
9	Rotherham United (R)	18	3	4	11	26	45	−19	13	Relegation to the Midland Combination League
10	Leeds City Vixens (R)	18	0	0	18	13	106	−93	0	Relegation to the Northern Combination League

Source: FA WPL
(C) Champions; (P) Promoted; (R) Relegated

=== Results ===
Home \ Away	BLA	DER	LEE	LEI	MAN	PRE	ROC	ROT	ALB	SHE
Blackburn Rovers	—	2–2	6–0	1–1	3–1	2–1	4–1	2–1	1–1	1–4
Derby County	2–2	—	7–0	2–0	1–3	1–1	2–1	2–2	1–1	2–3
Leeds City Vixens	1–11	1–8	—	0–3	1–5	0–6	1–3	1–2	4–7	2–3
Leicester City	2–4	4–1	6–0	—	0–3	2–1	3–0	2–0	0–3	6–0
Manchester City	1–3	7–1	11–0	1–2	—	3–2	2–0	4–0	1–0	5–3
Preston North End	2–1	1–2	2–0	1–1	0–4	—	2–1	1–0	1–2	2–4
Rochdale	1–1	1–3	8–1	1–1	1–0	0–1	—	2–1	0–0	1–5
Rotherham United	2–3	1–3	5–1	2–7	0–4	1–1	6–4	—	2–2	1–4
Sporting Club Albion	3–1	0–2	8–0	0–2	1–1	5–3	4–0	2–0	—	0–4
Sheffield	2–0	0–2	5–0	1–1	1–2	1–2	3–1	0–0	3–0	—

Source: FA WPL
Legend: Blue = home team win; Yellow = draw; Red = away team win.

== Southern Division ==
FA Women's Premier League Southern Division
- Season: 2011–12
- Champions: Portsmouth
- Promoted: Portsmouth
- Relegated: Plymouth Argyle; Keynsham Town
- Matches: 90
- Goals: 318 (3.53 per match)
- Biggest home win: Keynsham Town 8–2 Plymouth Argyle (30 October 2011)
- Biggest away win: Millwall Lionesses 0–6 Portsmouth (4 September 2011)

Map showing the locations of the teams in the Southern Division of the FA Women's Premier League
Map showing the locations of the teams in the Southern Division of the FA Women's Premier League

Changes from last season:

- Charlton Athletic were promoted to the National Division
- Cardiff City were promoted to the National Division
- Tottenham Hotspur were promoted from the South East Combination League
- Plymouth Argyle were promoted from the South West Combination League
- Millwall Lionesses were relegated from the National League
- Yeovil Town were relegated to the South West Combination League

=== League table ===
Pos	Team	Pld	W	D	L	GF	GA	GD	Pts	Promotion or relegation
1	Portsmouth (C, P)	18	12	3	3	49	22	+27	39	Promotion to the National Division
2	Colchester United	18	10	5	3	45	29	+16	35	
3	West Ham United	18	10	4	4	36	22	+14	34	
4	Brighton & Hove Albion	18	8	3	7	32	32	0	27	
5	Gillingham	18	6	5	7	21	28	−7	23	
6	Tottenham Hotspur	18	6	4	8	28	29	−1	22	
7	Queen's Park Rangers	18	5	5	8	25	34	−9	20	
8	Millwall Lionesses	18	4	5	9	25	38	−13	17	
9	Plymouth Argyle (R)	18	5	2	11	29	48	−19	17	Relegation to the South West Combination League
10	Keynsham Town (R)	18	3	6	9	28	36	−8	15	Relegation to the South West Combination League

Source: FA WPL
(C) Champions; (P) Promoted; (R) Relegated

=== Results ===
Home \ Away	BHA	COL	GIL	KEY	MIL	PLY	POR	QPR	TOT	WHU
Brighton & Hove Albion	—	2–2	1–2	3–3	3–2	3–0	1–0	3–2	0–2	3–2
Colchester United	3–2	—	4–1	2–2	5–0	2–0	1–1	2–2	1–1	1–2
Gillingham	1–2	1–4	—	2–1	2–1	0–2	1–2	1–1	1–0	0–0
Keynsham Town	2–2	2–3	1–3	—	2–0	8–2	0–2	0–0	0–1	0–2
Millwall Lionesses	1–2	3–2	1–0	2–0	—	3–3	0–6	0–1	4–0	0–0
Plymouth Argyle	1–0	1–2	4–1	3–1	1–1	—	1–5	1–3	1–4	1–2
Portsmouth	3–2	4–3	1–1	1–1	4–2	2–1	—	4–0	2–1	1–2
Queen's Park Rangers	4–0	1–2	1–2	1–1	2–2	5–4	1–4	—	0–4	0–1
Tottenham Hotspur	1–0	3–4	1–1	4–0	2–2	2–3	0–4	0–1	—	2–2
West Ham United	1–3	1–2	1–1	3–4	3–1	4–0	4–3	3–0	3–0	—

Source: FA WPL
Legend: Blue = home team win; Yellow = draw; Red = away team win.

== Northern Combination Women's Football League ==
Pos	Team	Pld	W	D	L	GF	GA	GD	Pts	Promotion or relegation
1	Newcastle United (C)	22	18	2	2	68	24	+44	56	Promoted to Northern Division
2	Sheffield Wednesday	21	14	3	4	53	24	+29	44 (Note: 1 point deducted)	
3	Bradford City	22	14	1	7	54	25	+29	43	
4	South Durham & Cestria	21	13	2	6	50	35	+15	41	
5	Liverpool Feds	22	12	1	9	47	37	+10	36	
6	Huddersfield Town	22	11	3	8	63	58	+5	36	
7	Cheadle Heath Nomads	22	8	4	10	50	44	+6	28	
8	Stockport County	22	8	3	11	39	44	−5	26	
9	Middlesbrough	22	7	6	9	36	43	−7	26	
10	Mossley Hill	22	6	7	9	42	38	+4	25	
11	Wakefield (R)	22	2	2	18	41	111	−70	8	Relegation from the Combination League
12	Salford (R)	22	0	2	20	14	74	−60	2	Relegation from the Combination League

Source: FA WCL
(C) Champions; (R) Relegated

== Midland Combination Women's Football League ==
Pos	Team	Pld	W	D	L	GF	GA	GD	Pts	Promotion or relegation
1	Wolverhampton Wanderers (C)	20	14	5	1	45	16	+29	47	Promoted to Northern Division
2	Stoke City	20	14	3	3	55	23	+32	45	
3	Leicester City Ladies	20	10	5	5	37	27	+10	35	
4	Coventry Copsewood	20	10	3	7	56	48	+8	33	
5	Leafield Athletic	20	9	5	6	38	32	+6	32	
6	Loughborough Foxes	20	8	2	10	35	39	−4	26	
7	Curzon Ashton	20	8	2	10	29	36	−7	26	
8	Loughborough Students	20	6	5	9	36	40	−4	23	
9	Radcliffe Olympic	20	6	5	9	27	35	−8	23	
10	Northampton Town (R)	20	3	2	15	24	44	−20	11	Relegation from the Combination League
11	TNS Llansantffraid (R)	20	3	1	16	20	62	−42	10	Relegation from the Combination League

Source: FA WCL
(C) Champions; (R) Relegated
