= FA Women's Premier League National Division =

Association football league in England

- Founded: 1991; 35 years ago
- Folded: 2013; 13 years ago
- Country: England
- Confederation: UEFA
- Divisions: 1
- Number of clubs: 10
- Level on pyramid: 1 (1991–2010); 2 (2010–2013)
- Relegation to: Northern Division; Southern Division
- Domestic cup(s): FA Women's Cup; FA Women's Community Shield (2000–2008)
- League cup: FA Women's Premier League Cup
- International cup: UEFA Women's Cup (2001–2010)
- Last champions: Sunderland WFC (2012–13)
- Most championships: Arsenal (12 times)
- Website: League home page

The FA Women's Premier League National Division (originally WFA National League Premier Division) was a division of the FA Women's Premier League, a football league in England. From 1991 until 2010, the National Division functioned as the top league in English women's football. During its final three seasons, the division operated as the second level of the league pyramid from 2010 to 2013. The division was played on a home and away basis, with each team playing each other twice, and points being awarded in the standard football format.

Below the National Division were simultaneously the Northern and Southern divisions and the remainder of the women's football pyramid. The terms Women's Premiership and Ladies' Premiership thus generally referred to the National Division alone. The women's National League Premier Division was conceived as the counterpart to the men's football First Division/Premier League.

Founded in 1991 by the Women's Football Association, the league was taken over and renamed "Premier League" in the season 1994–95 by the Football Association. The first title was won by Doncaster Belles in 1991–92. Arsenal hold the most championships, with 12 won between 1993 and 2010.

The National Division lost its top-league status and several teams when the FA introduced the summer competition Women's Super League (WSL) in 2011, with no further promotions. 2012–13 was the final season for the Women's Premier League National Division, with the last championship won by Sunderland, their third in succession. The division was scrapped at the end of the 2012–13 season, prior to the launch of the FA WSL 2 (now simply WSL 2).

== History ==
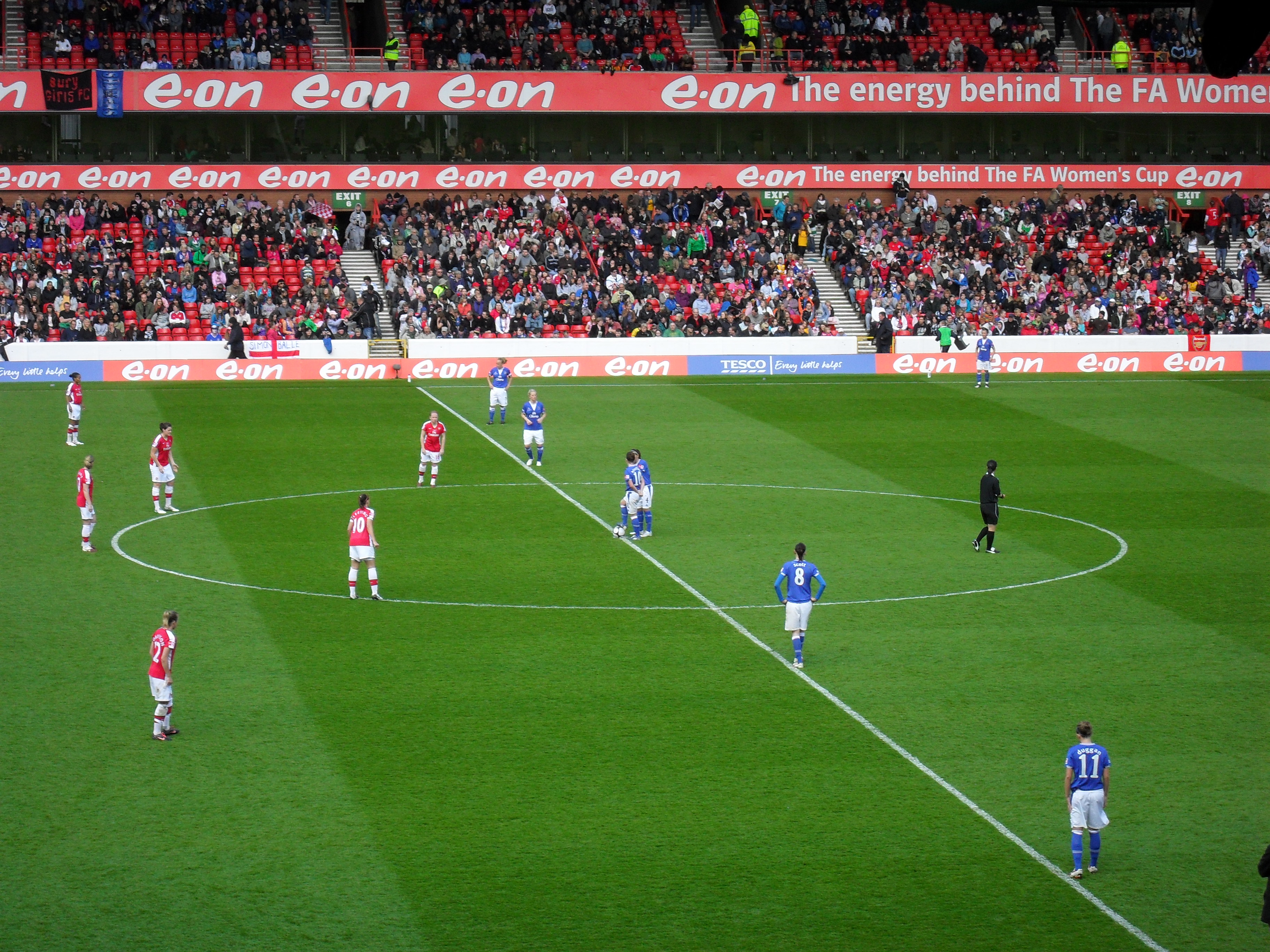
Arsenal and Everton were the National Division's last winners and runners-up respectively in 2009–10

In its first two seasons, the women's National League operated on the pointscoring system of two points for a win, switching to three points for a win in 1993–94.

In the first season, 1991–92, the division contained eight clubs, increasing to 10 clubs in 1992–93.

Premiership teams also competed in the WFA Cup/FA Women's Cup and the Premier League Cup. The first five League champions all won the League and FA Cup Double. From 2000 until 2008, the Premiership winner competed against the FA Cup winner or League runner-up annually for the FA Women's Community Shield. Until 2010, Premiership winners and runners-up competed in the UEFA Women's Cup/Women's Champions League as well.

For the 2006–07 season, the number of competing teams was increased from 10 to 12, with the promotion of the Northern (Blackburn Rovers) and Southern (Cardiff City) champions and no relegations despite test matches being played.

For the National Division's 2010–11 season, the division was reduced to eight clubs from twelve. Six clubs left to form the WSL, as did the Northern Division champions and runners-up, Liverpool and OOH Lincoln. The six remaining National Division clubs and the Southern Division top two, Barnet and Reading, thus comprised the second-level National Division.

== List of seasons ==
As level 1 division:

Note: Bold designates teams that won a double with the Women's FA Cup.
† Arsenal won a treble with the UEFA Women's Cup in 2007.

Year	Winner	Runner up	Third place	Relegated
1991–92	Doncaster Belles	Red Star Southampton	Wimbledon	None (expansion to 10 clubs)
1992–93	Arsenal	Doncaster Belles	Knowsley United	Maidstone Tigresses, Bronte
1993–94	Doncaster Belles	Arsenal	Knowsley United	Ipswich Town, Wimbledon
1994–95	Arsenal	Liverpool	Doncaster Belles	Red Star Southampton
1995–96	Croydon	Doncaster Belles	Arsenal	Villa Aztecs, Wolverhampton Wanderers
1996–97	Arsenal	Doncaster Belles	Croydon	Southampton Saints, Ilkeston Town
1997–98	Everton	Arsenal	Doncaster Belles	Barnet, Barry Town
1998–99	Croydon	Arsenal	Doncaster Belles	Bradford City, Ilkeston Town
1999–2000	Croydon	Doncaster Belles	Arsenal	Aston Villa, Reading Royals
2000–01	Arsenal	Doncaster Belles	Charlton Athletic	Millwall Lionesses, Liverpool
2001–02	Arsenal	Doncaster Belles	Charlton Athletic	Barry Town, Sunderland
2002–03	Fulham	Doncaster Belles	Arsenal	Southampton Saints, Brighton & Hove Albion
2003–04	Arsenal	Charlton Athletic	Fulham	Aston Villa, Tranmere Rovers
2004–05	Arsenal	Charlton Athletic	Everton	Liverpool, Bristol City
2005–06	Arsenal	Everton	Charlton Athletic	None (expansion to 12 clubs)
2006–07	Arsenal †	Everton	Charlton Athletic	Sunderland, Fulham
2007–08	Arsenal	Everton	Charlton Athletic	Cardiff City, Charlton Athletic
2008–09	Arsenal	Everton	Chelsea	Liverpool, Fulham
2009–10	Arsenal	Everton	Chelsea	League restructured due to FA WSL

As FA level 2 division:

Year	Winner	Runner up	Third place	Relegated
2010–11	Sunderland	Nottingham Forest	Reading	Blackburn Rovers, Millwall Lionesses
2011–12	Sunderland	Leeds United	Aston Villa	Nottingham Forest, Reading
2012–13	Sunderland	Watford	Leeds United	League restructured due to FA WSL 2

The Women's Premier League name continued at level 3 in 2013–14 after the National Division was scrapped.

== Performance by club ==
Club	Winners	Runners-up	Winning years
Arsenal	12	3	1992–93, 1994–95, 1996–97, 2000–01, 2001–02, 2003–04, 2004–05, 2005–06, 2006–07, 2007–08, 2008–09, 2009–10
Croydon/Charlton Athletic	3	2	1995–96, 1998–99, 1999–2000
Sunderland	3	0	2010–11, 2011–12, 2012–13
Doncaster Rovers Belles	2	7	1991–92, 1993–94
Everton	1	5	1997–98
Fulham	1	0	2002–03
Liverpool	0	1	1994–95
Nottingham Forest	0	1	2010–11
Leeds United	0	1	2011–12

== See also ==
- Women's football (soccer)
- List of women's football teams
- List of women's football (soccer) competitions
