= Leeds United W.F.C. =

British women's association football team

Leeds United Women
- Full name: Leeds United Women Football Club
- Nickname: The Whites
- Founded: 1989
- Ground: Bannister Prentice Stadium, Garforth
- Capacity: 3,000 (278 seated)
- Chair: Julie Lewis
- Manager: Simon Wood
- League: FA Women's National League Division One North
- 2024–25: FA Women's National League Division One North, 4th of 12
- Website: https://www.leedsunited.com/en/matches/womens-team/fixtures
Home colours	Away colours	Third colours

Leeds United Women are an English women's football club based in Leeds, West Yorkshire. They are currently members of the FA Women's National League Division One North.

== History ==
In 1989, Leeds United Women F.C. was formed and after playing in the Yorkshire and Humberside League for seven years, the 1997–98 season saw the team gain promotion to the FA Northern Premier League under the management of Mark Hodgson. In 1999–2000 season they reached the semi-finals of the FA Women's Cup Narrowly losing 2–1 to Croydon in a very close game at Ossett Albion. After consolidating and adjusting to National League football for a couple of seasons, the team achieved promotion with a 5–0 win away at Wolverhampton Wanderers on 7 May 2001 and were crowned champions of the Northern Premier League and gained promotion to the Women's Premier League. Leeds finished a credible fourth in their first season in the top flight, with manager Mark Hodgson winning The FA Women's Premier Leagues 'Manager of the Year' award. The following season proved to be a tough one and Leeds finished the league in seventh place.

The 2003–04 season saw a new manager, Julie Chipchase, appointed and Leeds once again finished in fourth place – the highest-placed team outside London. In the 2004–05 season the side finished in fifth place.

=== Split from Leeds United ===
The chairman of Leeds United A.F.C., Ken Bates, cut the ladies' club's funding by stopping financial backing in 2005, and withdrawing the Thorp Arch training facilities in 2006. The ladies' team managed to survive using sponsorship money. They were first sponsored in a two-year deal worth over £70,000 by EmpireDirect.co.uk, before receiving sponsorship from Leeds Metropolitan University in a deal reported to be worth in excess of £250,000 over 5 years, starting in 2007.

The 2005–06 season saw the team accomplish one of its greatest achievements to date, playing in the FA Women's Cup final against overwhelming favourites Arsenal Ladies. Leeds United legend Allan Clarke presented them with sock tags before the match, similar to those worn by the Leeds United male team in their 1972 FA Cup Final victory, in a bid to give the team luck. Nevertheless, the match did not turn out how the team had hoped, with Arsenal winning the game 5–0.

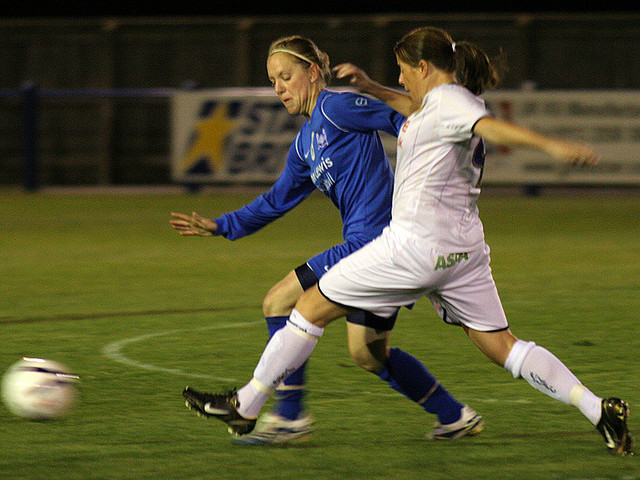
Leeds's Rachel Stowell (right) in 2006 against Birmingham

The 2006–07 season was a fluctuating one, with Leeds topping the table over the Christmas period and the team getting through to the FA Women's Premier League Cup final for a second time. The opposition was again Arsenal and Leeds put in a much better performance than in their previous cup final appearance, but they lost out to a last-minute strike by Arsenal's Jayne Ludlow. This seemed to have a big impact, as the team didn't perform as well in the closing stages of the season and they had dropped down to fifth by the end of the season. The club won the Marketing Club of the Year award at the FA Women's Awards in May 2007 for the third consecutive year.

A change in management was made in the close season and Rick Passmoor and Leanne Hall were appointed manager and assistant manager respectively in July 2007. The new management team made a number of new signings, including Steph Houghton, Carly Telford, Katie Holtham, Georgie Adams, Jade Moore and Carla Ward. By March 2008 the team were lying mid-table in the Premier League but finished in third position with 40 points, below Everton on 57 points and Arsenal on 62 points.

The 2007–2008 season saw the club reach their second FA Women's Cup final, their third cup final in as many years. Arsenal again were their opponents and the match mirrored the previous League Cup final. The game was 0–0 at halftime, although Arsenal produced most of the chances in the first half and constantly forced United goalkeeper Carly Telford into some amazing saves. Action at the opposite end of the pitch was non-existent, as United striker Amanda Barr struggled. In the second half Arsenal scored three goals in seven minutes: Smith 53, Ludlow 59 and Sanderson 60. Leeds fought back with a header from Jess Clarke on 69, but Arsenal sealed their season double with a final goal from Kelly Smith seven minutes from time. Carly Telford was named Player of the Match before a record crowd of 24,582 at the City Ground.

In the 2008 close season the club's name became Leeds Carnegie Ladies. England U23 striker Carla Cantrell signed from Doncaster Rovers Belles and England U19's Ellen White, also a striker, joined from Chelsea. After a poor start and with key players injured for extended periods, Leeds finished sixth in the Premier League in season 2008–09.

In January 2010 the club's future was cast into doubt when their bid to join the FA Women's Super League collapsed. The following month they won the club's first major trophy, the Premier League Cup, with a 3–1 win over Everton at Spotland Stadium on 11 February 2010.

In March 2013 the club were confirmed as one of 33 clubs to apply for up to 18 places available in the expanded two tier 2014 FA WSL with the outcome expected in June 2014. The club has started a "Show Some Love for Leeds United Ladies" campaign stating that the future of the club could depend on the success of their WSL application.

Leeds United withdrew funding and permission to use their name and branding at the end of the 2013–14 season, causing Leeds United Ladies to cease to exist. In the immediate aftermath, a group of supporters rallied to create a new club, Leeds Ladies FC, to carry on the tradition of Ladies football in Leeds.

=== (2017–) ===
Following a varied season on and off the field; a break away from the vision which was laid out at the beginning and broken promises, it was decided that an EGM would be called to decide upon the future of the existing structure. It was decided that there was no longer any confidence in the previous leadership and a new committee would now take control of Leeds Ladies FC.

After the EGM, the previous committee laid claim to the legal ownership of the club cancelling all training facilities and withheld club assets including playing kits and attempted to immediately dissolve the club. In order to ensure that the club kept going the new committee purchased a new kit, reinstated and paid for all training facilities and fulfilled all fixtures for both senior and both youth teams.

The FA requested that the previous committee prove legal ownership which they have been unable to do.

The club announced the appointment of a new structure behind the club, appointing Lee Townend as chairman of Leeds Ladies Football Club, with the full advisory support from the main sponsor Andrew Pinder. Lee previously worked with the club as director of football and head of youth development so he brings an extensive knowledge of the club to the new structure. Lee will be joined in the day to day matters by Kirsty Emmot who has been appointed as club treasurer and Jo Czibor as club secretary. Lewis Atkinson will become director of football and will maintain his position as first team manager supported by his coaching team. The remaining roles have been filled by the leadership team ensuring the club structure is in safe hands with a 6-person-strong executive committee.

In June 2017, new Leeds owner Andrea Radrizzani brought back Leeds Ladies to Leeds United ownership to become Leeds United Ladies again after the club had previously become its own entity after previous owner Massimo Cellino decided to stop Leeds United funding in 2014.

== Players ==
As of 19 August 2023.

Note: Flags indicate national team as defined under FIFA eligibility rules; some limited exceptions apply. Players may hold more than one non-FIFA nationality.

No.	Pos.	Nation	Player
1	GK	AUS	Carrie Simpson
2	DF	ENG	Izzy Elliott
3	DF	ENG	Rebekah Bass (captain)
4	DF	ENG	Olivia Smart (vice-captain)
5	MF	ENG	Ellie Dobson
6	MF	ENG	Danielle Whitham
7	MF	ENG	Sarah Danby
8	MF	ENG	Leoni Price
9	FW	WAL	Jemimah Osborne

No.	Pos.	Nation	Player
10	MF	ENG	Sarah Clarke
11	FW	ENG	Abbie Brown
12	DF	ENG	Harriet Jakeman
13	GK	ENG	Millie Robshaw-Charlesworth
14	DF	ENG	Molly Beacock
15	MF	WAL	Paige Williams
16	FW	ENG	Laura Bartup
18	MF	ENG	Macy Ellis
20	DF	GIB	Charlyann Pizzarello

== Management ==
Position	Staff
Manager	Simon Wood
Assistant Manager	Angus Hall
First Team Coach	Nick Dingwall
First Team Physio	Leah Robinson
Manager Reserves	Rachel Hindle
Coach Reserves	Tara Nolan
Strength and Conditioning Coach	Chris Plater

Updated to match played 9 March 2023
Source: Leeds United Official Site

== Honours ==
League

- FA Women's Premier League National Division
  - Runners-up (1): 2011–12
- FA Women's Premier League Northern Division
  - Champions (1): 2000–01

Cup

- FA Women's Cup
  - Runners-up (2): 2006, 2008
- FA Women's Premier League Cup
  - Winners (1): 2010
  - Runners-up (3): 2007, 2012, 2013
- FA Women's National League Plate
  - Winners (1): 2022-23
- West Riding County FA Women's County Cup
  - Winners (1): 2024-25, 2025-26

== See also ==
- Bradford City A.F.C. Women
- Huddersfield Town F.C. Women
- Sheffield United F.C. Women
- Sunderland A.F.C. Women
- York City L.F.C.
