= Women's Super League =

Association football league in England

- Organising body: WSL Football
- Founded: March 2010; 16 years ago
- First season: 2011
- Country: England
- Confederation: UEFA
- Number of clubs: 14
- Level on pyramid: 1
- Relegation to: Women's Super League 2
- Domestic cup: Women's FA Cup
- League cup: WSL Players Cup
- International cup(s): UEFA Women's Champions League; UEFA Women's Europa Cup
- Current champions: Manchester City (2nd title) (2025–26)
- Most championships: Chelsea (8 titles)
- Top scorer: Vivianne Miedema (97)
- Broadcasters: Sky Sports; BBC Sport; International: Broadcasters
- Website: www.wslfootball.com
- Current: 2026–27 Women's Super League

The Women's Super League (WSL), also known as the Barclays Women's Super League for sponsorship reasons, and formerly the FA WSL, is a professional association football league and the highest level of women's football in England. Currently operated by WSL Football, the league was established in 2010 by the Football Association (FA) and features fourteen fully professional teams. The league replaced the FA Women's Premier League National Division as the highest level of women's football in England, with eight teams competing in the inaugural 2011 season. In the WSL's first two seasons, there was no relegation from the division.

The WSL discarded the winter football season for six years, between 2011 and 2016, playing through the summer instead (from March until October). Since 2017–18, the WSL has operated as a winter league running from September to May, as was traditional before 2011. From 2014 to 2017–18, the Women's Super League consisted of two divisions—FA WSL 1 and FA WSL 2—and brought a promotion and relegation system to the WSL. Ahead of the 2018–19 season, the second division was renamed the FA Women's Championship. After the 2024–25 season, it was rebranded once again and is now known as the Women's Super League 2.

The WSL champions, runners-up and third-placed team qualify for the UEFA Women's Champions League the following season. Since its inception, four clubs have won the title: Chelsea (8), Arsenal (3), Liverpool (2) and Manchester City (2). The current WSL champions are Manchester City, who won their second title in the 2025–26 season.

== History ==
The FA WSL was due to start in 2010 to replace the FA Women's Premier League National Division as the top level of women's football in England but was deferred for a year due to the global economic downturn. Sixteen clubs applied for 8 places in the inaugural season of the league: Arsenal, Barnet, Birmingham City, Bristol Academy, Chelsea, Colchester United, Doncaster Rovers Belles, Everton, Leeds Carnegie, Leicester City, Lincoln Ladies, Liverpool, Millwall Lionesses, Newcastle United, Nottingham Forest, and Sunderland. Leeds Carnegie later withdrew their application. Women's Premier League clubs Blackburn Rovers and Watford declined to apply. FA Chief Executive Ian Watmore described the creation of the league as a "top priority" in February 2010.

The inaugural WSL season kicked off on 13 April 2011 at Imperial Fields, Chelsea's home ground, with a match between Chelsea and Arsenal, which Chelsea lost 1–0.

For the 2014 season, a second division was created named FA WSL 2, with nine teams and one team being relegated from the WSL 1. WSL 1 remained as eight teams, with the WSL 2 having ten teams. The new WSL 1 licence was awarded to Manchester City. Doncaster Rovers Belles were relegated to the WSL 2. They appealed against their demotion but were unsuccessful.

In December 2014, the FA WSL announced a two-year plan to expand the WSL 1 from an eight to a ten-team league. Two teams were promoted from the WSL 2 at the end of the 2015 season, while one team was relegated to the WSL 2 with the same happening at the end of the 2016 season. Also, for the first time, a team from the FA Women's Premier League earned a promotion to WSL 2, effectively connecting the WSL to the rest of the English women's football pyramid.

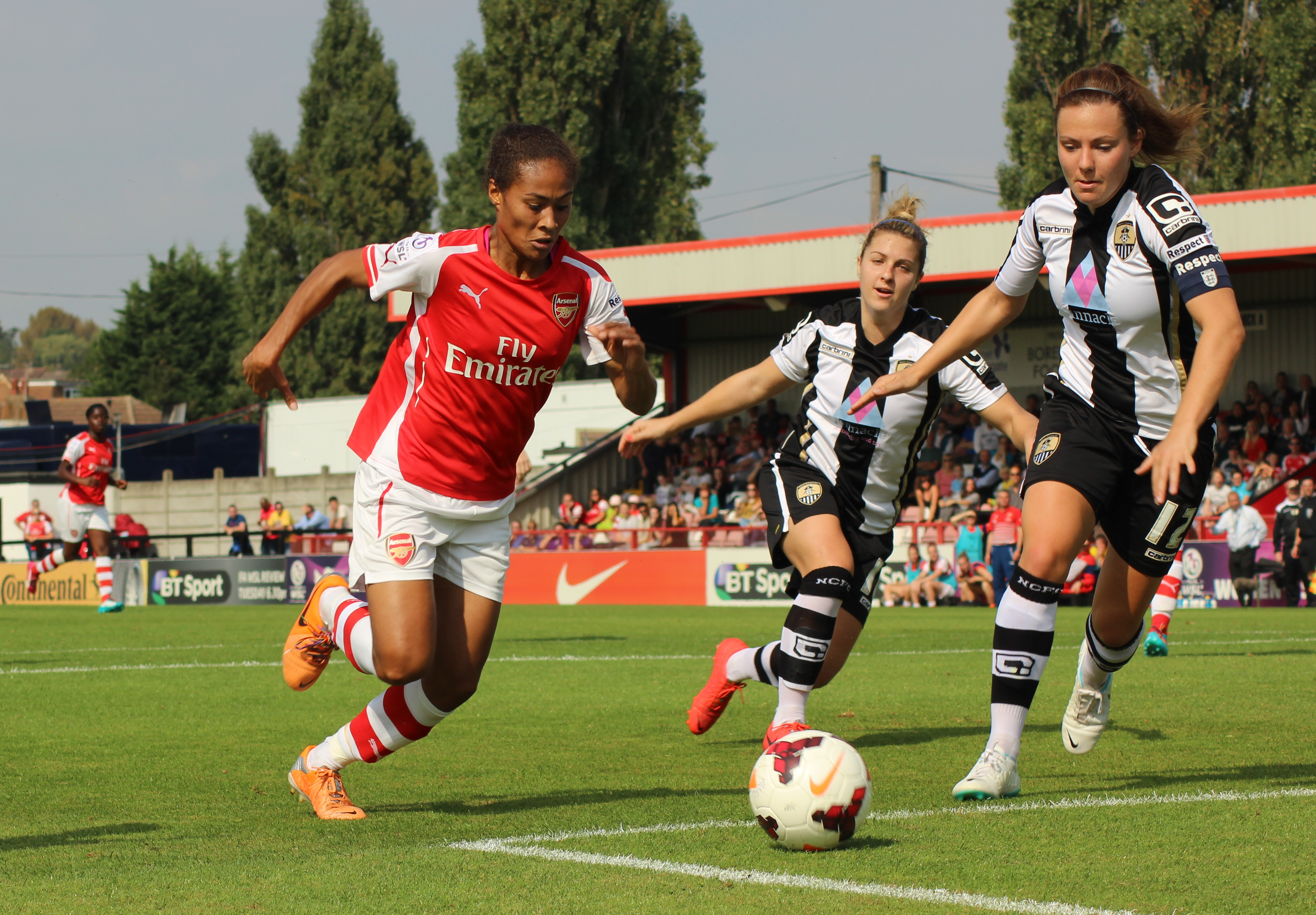
Arsenal and Notts County during the 2014 season

The FA announced in July 2016 that the league would move from a summer league format to a winter league, in line with the traditional football calendar in England, with matches played from September to May the following year. A shortened bridging season took place, branded as the FA WSL Spring Series, with teams playing each other once from February to May 2017.

Following the 2017–18 FA WSL season, WSL 1 was renamed back to the FA Women's Super League, becoming a fully professional league for the first time, with eleven teams for the 2018–19 season. Teams had to re-apply for their licence to earn their place in the league, requiring clubs to offer their players a minimum 16-hour a week contract and to form a youth academy as compulsory for the new licence criteria. Sunderland was moved down to tier 3 in the women's football pyramid after not receiving a licence whilst Brighton & Hove Albion and West Ham United were added to the league.

The league was extended to twelve teams for the 2019–20 season, with Yeovil Town relegated after going into administration and being replaced by Manchester United and Tottenham Hotspur, who gained promotion from the Championship.

In May 2020, the league was curtailed by the COVID-19 pandemic. Chelsea were declared champions of the season based on a points-per-game average.

At the conclusion of the 2020–21 season, four first-team managers resigned from their positions at WSL clubs Birmingham, Manchester United, Arsenal, and Aston Villa. Birmingham's outgoing manager Carla Ward questioned the commitment of some of the clubs involved in WSL, whilst Manchester United's outgoing manager Casey Stoney allegedly quit because of unresolved issues surrounding lack of training facilities and other infrastructure.

In November 2023, all 24 Women's Super League and Women's Championship clubs unanimously agreed to form a new organisation to run the women's professional game in England, taking over from the FA. The organisation was named NewCo, and Nikki Doucet was named CEO. Starting with the 2024–25 season, the company was known as Women's Professional Leagues Limited (WPLL). After the season, the organisation rebranded once again and is now known as WSL Football.

In June 2025, it was announced that the WSL would expand to 14 teams from the 2026–27 season onwards. As a result, the 2025–26 Women's Super League 2 season directly promoted two teams, while the last-placed WSL team played in a promotion/relegation play-off against the third-placed WSL 2 side.

== Competition structure ==
Season(s)	Teams
2011 to 2015	8
2016	9
2017–18	10
2018–19	11
2019–20 to 2025–26	12
2026–27 onwards	14

The Women's Super League currently consists of fourteen clubs. Initially the league was described as professional, with the top four players on each team being paid an annual salary in excess of £20,000. However, in November 2010 it was confirmed that the WSL would be semi-professional, with only a "handful" of top players full-time. Clubs' annual wage bills were expected to be approximately one-tenth of those in the now-defunct American Women's Professional Soccer.

The 2011 season included a mid-season break from 12 May 2011, to allow for the 2011 FIFA Women's World Cup. The season then resumed in early July, finishing in August 2011.

The WSL teams not participating in Europe compete in a knock-out cup competition, the Players Cup (named League Cup before 2026). For the 2014 season, the teams were placed into three regional groups of six. The group winners and best-performing runners-up all advanced to a knockout semi-final. Since the 2015 season, the League Cup have been played simultaneously with the league season.

Following a review, the FA announced in September 2017 that a restructuring of the league and its licensing criteria would follow from the 2017–18 season with a goal of a fully professional top division of between 8 and 14 teams and a second division of up to 12 semi-professional teams. For the 2018–19 season, the league became fully professional.

== Clubs ==
The following fourteen clubs are competing in the 2026–27 season:

Team	Location	Main home ground	Capacity	2025–26 position
Arsenal	London (Holloway)	Emirates Stadium	60,704	2nd
Aston Villa	Birmingham	Villa Park	42,640	9th
Birmingham City	Birmingham	St Andrew's	29,409	WSL 2, 1st
Brighton & Hove Albion	Crawley	Broadfield Stadium	6,134	7th
Charlton Athletic	London (Charlton)	The Valley	27,111	WSL 2, 3rd
Chelsea	London (Fulham)	Stamford Bridge	40,044	3rd
Crystal Palace	London (Sutton)	360 Engage Stadium	7,032	WSL 2, 2nd
Everton	Liverpool	Goodison Park	39,414	8th
Liverpool	St Helens	BrewDog Stadium	18,000	11th
London City Lionesses	London (Bromley)	Hayes Lane	6,100	6th
Manchester City	Manchester	Academy Stadium	7,000	1st
Manchester United	Leigh	Leigh Sports Village	12,000	4th
Tottenham Hotspur	London (Leyton)	Brisbane Road	9,271	5th
West Ham United	London (Dagenham)	Victoria Road	6,078	10th

== Players ==
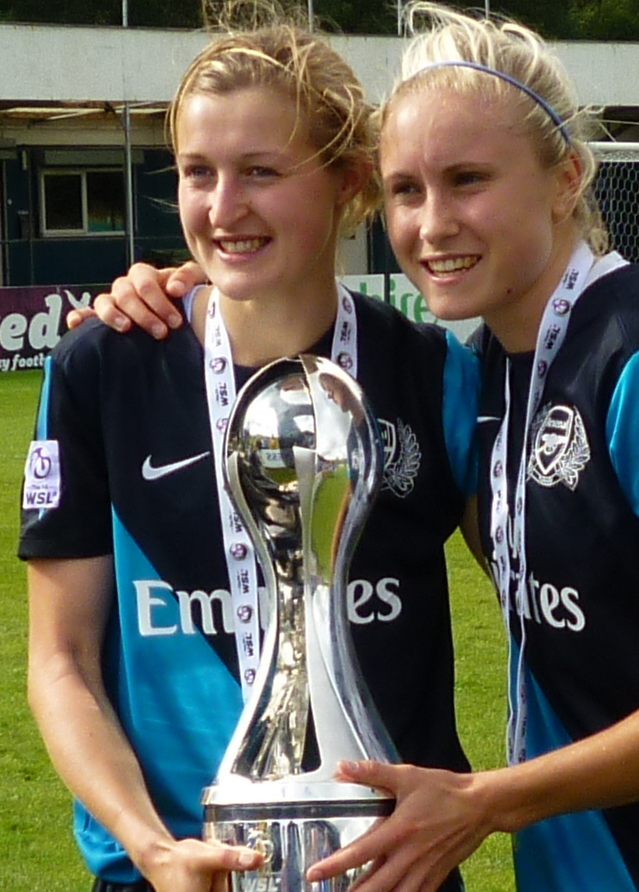
Arsenal's Ellen White (L) and Steph Houghton (R) with the previous WSL trophy during the inaugural 2011 season

In the first season of the WSL clubs were subject to a squad cap of 20 players. This proved unpopular with both managers and players. Ahead of the 2012 season, the rule was reviewed and the cap increased to 23 players. Players from outside the European Union, like their male counterparts, are subject to Home Office work permit regulations.

The FA said in April 2012 that the salary rule of allowing only four players per team to earn over £20,000 and that all clubs are paid £70,000 per season from a Club Development Fund should limit any financial "imbalance" between clubs. However, the introduction of a genuine salary cap remained under consideration for 2013 and beyond. Doncaster manager John Buckley revealed that his club lost Rachel Williams and other players to Birmingham City because he was working to a budget one-eighth of that enjoyed by Birmingham.

When the 2012 WPS season was cancelled in the United States, Lincoln Ladies manager Glen Harris said that the next destination of that league's British players would be decided by "pounds, shillings and pence." Ultimately Kelly Smith, Alex Scott and Gemma Davison all joined Arsenal, while Ifeoma Dieke and Anita Asante joined the Swedish Damallsvenskan in preference to the WSL.

On 20 May 2023, Reading manager Kelly Chambers noted that the team—the only WSL club not affiliated with a men's Premier League club—struggled to compete with a smaller budget for wages than women's sides with Premier League backing. She cited the £250,000 fee paid by Tottenham Hotspur for Bethany England, while some Reading staff were required to work multiple roles from lack of investment by its affiliated men's side in the EFL Championship.

== Champions ==
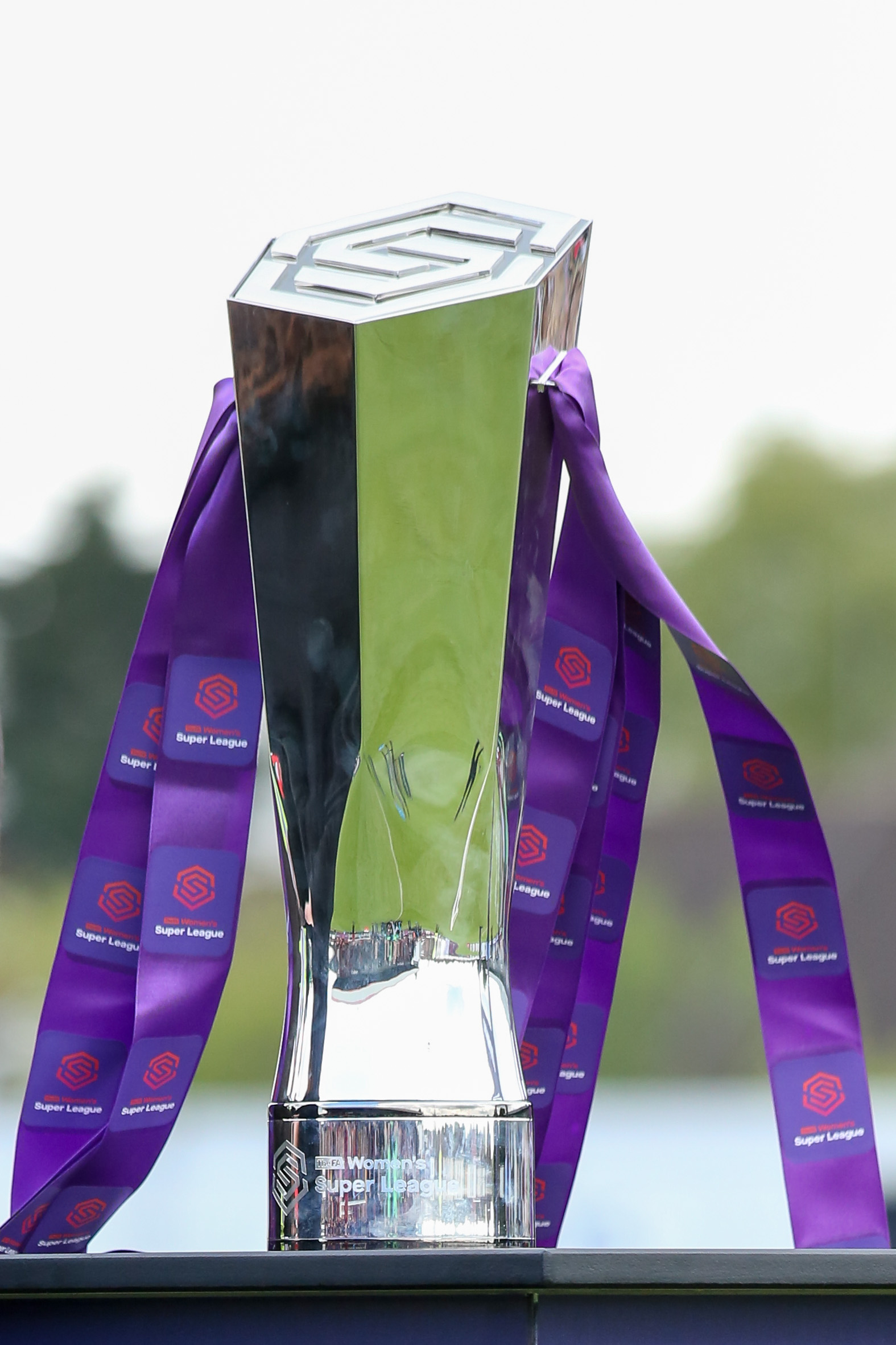
The WSL trophy since the rebranding from the 2018–19 season

=== By season ===
Teams in just bold indicate doubles with the Women's FA Cup. Teams in bold and in italics indicate trebles with the Women's FA Cup and Players Cup.

List of Women's Super League seasons
Year	Winners	Runners-up	Third place	Top goalscorer	
Year	Winners	Runners-up	Third place	Player	Goals
2011	**Arsenal**	Birmingham City	Everton	(England) Rachel Williams (Birmingham City)	14
2012	Arsenal	Birmingham City	Everton	(Scotland) Kim Little (Arsenal)	11
2013	Liverpool	Bristol Academy	Arsenal	(England) Natasha Dowie (Liverpool)	13
2014	Liverpool	Chelsea	Birmingham City	(England) Karen Carney (Birmingham City)	8
2015	**Chelsea**	Manchester City	Arsenal	(England) Beth Mead (Sunderland)	12
2016	Manchester City	Chelsea	Arsenal	(England) Eniola Aluko (Chelsea)	9
2017–18	**Chelsea**	Manchester City	Arsenal	(England) Ellen White (Birmingham City)	15
2018–19	Arsenal	Manchester City	Chelsea	(Netherlands) Vivianne Miedema (Arsenal)	22
2019–20 (Note: Due to the COVID-19 pandemic, the season ended early and the league was decided on a points-per-game basis.)	Chelsea	Manchester City	Arsenal	(Netherlands) Vivianne Miedema (Arsenal)	16
2020–21	**Chelsea**	Manchester City	Arsenal	(Australia) Sam Kerr (Chelsea)	21
2021–22	**Chelsea**	Arsenal	Manchester City	(Australia) Sam Kerr (Chelsea)	20
2022–23	**Chelsea**	Manchester United	Arsenal	(England) Rachel Daly (Aston Villa)	22
2023–24	Chelsea	Manchester City	Arsenal	(Jamaica) Khadija Shaw (Manchester City)	21
2024–25	**Chelsea**	Arsenal	Manchester United	(England) Alessia Russo (Arsenal) (Jamaica) Khadija Shaw (Manchester City)	12
2025–26	**Manchester City**	Arsenal	Chelsea	(Jamaica) Khadija Shaw (Manchester City)	21

Spring Series

The FA WSL Spring Series was an interim edition organised to bridge the gap from the 2016 season which ran from March to September as a summer tournament, and the 2017–18 season which started in September 2017. It is not recognised as an official title as it has not been played throughout the whole season.

Year	Winners	Runners-up	Third place	Top goalscorer	
Year	Winners	Runners-up	Third place	Player	Goals
2017 (Spring Series)	Chelsea	Manchester City	Arsenal	(England) Fran Kirby (Chelsea)	6

=== By club ===
Performances in the Women's Super League by club (Note: Spring Series are not included.)
Club	Winners	Runners-up	Years won	Years runners-up
Chelsea	8	2	2015, 2017–18, 2019–20, 2020–21, 2021–22, 2022–23, 2023–24, 2024–25	2014, 2016
Arsenal	3	3	2011, 2012, 2018–19	2021–22, 2024–25, 2025–26
Manchester City	2	6	2016, 2025–26	2015, 2017–18, 2018–19, 2019–20, 2020–21, 2023–24
Liverpool	2	0	2013, 2014	
Birmingham City	0	2		2011, 2012
Bristol Academy	0	1		2013
Manchester United	0	1		2022–23

== Records and statistics ==
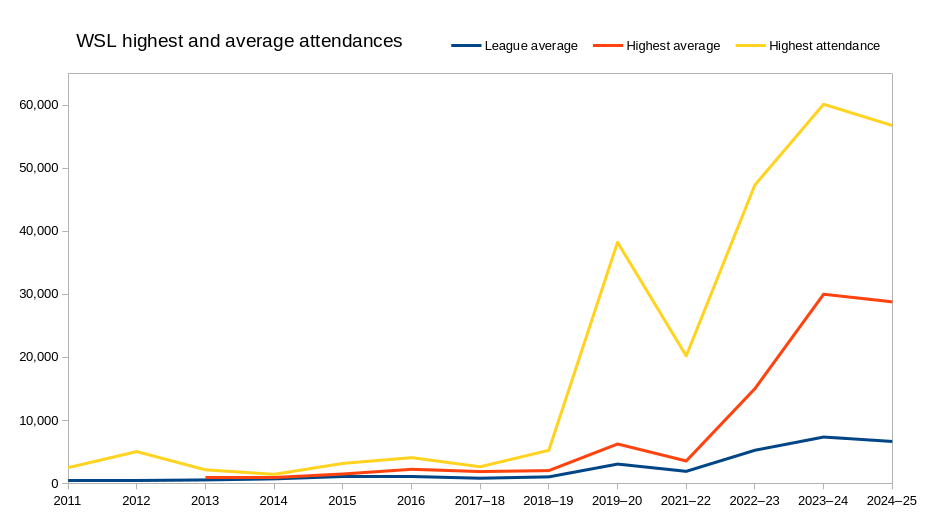
WSL highest and average attendances 2011–2025

Chelsea have won the most titles with 8 alongside the most consecutive wins, biggest title-winning margin, most points and most goals in a season. Since the 2022–23 season, Arsenal have held the record for the highest average attendance per season and highest attendance game, breaking the record three more times during the 2023–24 season. The club has the top three highest attendances in the WSL, all made at the Emirates Stadium, with the highest league attendance now set at 60,160 after the February 2024 match against Manchester United. Arsenal previously held the attendance record from 2012 until 2019 in a match against Chelsea with a crowd of 5,052. The club also holds the match record for the biggest win and highest scoring match with 11–1 against Bristol City in the 2019–20 season. Bristol City have experienced the most defeats in a season with 18 and Reading the most draws with 9.

Vivianne Miedema holds numerous player records including the most WSL goals and goal contributions, most goals scored in a season with 22 (shared with Rachel Daly), and quickest to reach 50 and 100 goals in the league. Further achievements include most goals scored in a single match with 6, most goal involvements in a game with 10, most assists in a match with 4, and most hat-tricks in a season with 3. Only Khadija Shaw, who has also won two golden boots, has more WSL hat-tricks than Miedema with 6. Beth Mead has provided the most assists and the most assists in a single season with 12, Jordan Nobbs has made the most WSL appearances with 210, and Mary Earps has the most cleansheets with 56. Millie Bright has won the most titles as a player with 8, all of which were with Chelsea, and Emma Hayes as a manager has won the most titles with 7, also with Chelsea.

== Hall of Fame ==
In September 2021, the Women's Super League announced the first inductees into the Barclays FA WSL Hall of Fame, recognising significant individuals who have contributed to the growth of the women's game in England and the WSL.

== Finances ==
WSL club financials (accounts ending in 2025)
Club	Expenditure (£)	Income (£)	Pre-tax profit/loss (£)
Arsenal	21,621,000	21,642,000	21,000
Brighton & Hove Albion	8,686,260	1,438,188	-7,248,072
Chelsea	38,792,474	21,695,481	-17,096,993
Crystal Palace	3,965,000	1,317,000	-2,648,000
Everton	4,243,417	2,963,076	-1,280,341
Leicester City	6,326,000	1,530,000	-4,796,000
Liverpool	5,998,427	6,163,747	165,320
Manchester City	13,974,000	11,146,000	-2,828,000
Manchester United	10,355,000	10,865,000	510,000
Tottenham Hotspur	8,431,726	4,530,026	-3,901,700

=== Sponsorship ===
As of 31 July 2025, the WSL Football's total annual sponsorship revenue was reported to be about £8.5 million from sponsorship and licensing.

In March 2019, the Women's Super League agreed a multi-million sponsorship deal with British bank Barclays from the start of the 2019–20 season. The three-year sponsorship deal is reported to be in excess of £10 million with a prize money pot of £500,000 for the league champions for the first time. The FA described the deal as "the biggest ever investment in UK women's sport by a brand". Barclays renewed the sponsorship with an additional three-year deal on 15 December 2021, doubled its rights fee, and extended its sponsorship to the FA Women's Championship. The league's WSL Football company also indicated the signing of new sponsorship deals with Nike, British Gas, Apple, and Mercedes-Benz following its taking over of the league in 2024.

The league's lead sponsor from 2012 to 2019 was Continental Tyres. Continental sponsored the FA's new commercial programme from 2014 to 2018 including the England women's national football team, FA Women's Cup and the FA WSL Continental Cup in addition to the WSL. During the 2011 season, Yorkshire Building Society was also a sponsorship partner along with Continental.

Most shirt sponsorships for women's sides affiliated with men's clubs are bundled and not sold or valued separately.

=== Investment from Premier League clubs ===
In the 2022–23 season, 11 of the WSL's 12 teams were affiliates of men's Premier League clubs, with the only exception being Reading, who were affiliated with a lower-tier men's side. Arsenal, Chelsea, Liverpool, Manchester City, Manchester United, and Tottenham Hotspur combined had spent a total of £123.6 million on their women's sides from the league's founding in 2011 to the 2022–23 season. A report in The Telegraph compared this spending to the £186 million those clubs' spent on agents' fees for men's player transactions from 1 February 2022 to 31 January 2023. Those clubs spent £33 million on their women's sides over the same period.

=== Declined investments ===
In July 2022, The FA declined a £150 million offer from an unnamed private equity firm to purchase the league. Baroness Sue Campbell had noted that The FA had refused other private equity offers.

== Broadcasting ==
As of 2021, matches are broadcast and streamed in the United Kingdom and Ireland via The FA Player, Sky Sports, and the BBC (UK only). Internationally, select matches are broadcast in at least twelve countries, including Australia, Canada, Denmark, Dominican Republic, Finland, Germany, Italy, Mexico, New Zealand, Norway, and Sweden, and the United States.

=== In the United Kingdom and Ireland ===
FA women's competitions were initially broadcast on ESPN from 2009 to 2013 as part of a four-year broadcast rights deal. Six live matches were broadcast in 2011 in addition to weekly highlights, with ten games shown in 2012. ESPN broadcast the opening game of the WSL between Chelsea and Arsenal at Imperial Fields on 13 April 2011, a game Arsenal won 1–0 with a first half goal by Gilly Flaherty. The second televised game took place on 12 May 2011 as Doncaster Belles lost 1–0 to Everton Ladies at the Keepmoat Stadium, Doncaster. In 2013, BBC Two broadcast four WSL programmes during the 2013–14 season. Each programme featured goal round-ups, highlights and features.

During the 2017–18 season, many WSL games were broadcast on television by BT Sport, online and red-button by the BBC (UK only), and via the league's Facebook page. BBC Sport continued to air one game a weekend digitally via their iPlayer service and website, while subscription channel Sky Sports also holds the rights to televise a selection of matches. For the 2019–20 season, league matches were streamed via The FA Player, as well as some Women's Championship games, highlights from the FA Cup, League Cup and international England games. Some games in The FA Player were excluded, such as those broadcast on BT Sport in the UK and Ireland due to licensing rights.

In March 2021, the FA WSL announced a new record-breaking three-year domestic television rights deal with Sky Sports and BBC, beginning with the 2021–22 season. Sky would broadcast 44 matches per season with a further 22 matches shown on BBC platforms including a minimum of 18 on BBC One or Two. All other fixtures would remain available to stream for free on The FA Player, the governing body's own over OTT service. Believed to be worth around £8 million a season, it was the biggest broadcast deal of any professional women's football league in the world and marked the first time that the WSL's rights had been sold separately from the men's game.

In July 2024, YouTube was listed as a new streaming service for non-broadcast WSL matches and select Women's Championship fixtures, as part of a transition from the FA Player. Sky Sports and BBC remained rights holders for the 2024–25 season, with Sky and Now TV broadcasting 44 matches, and the BBC broadcasting 22 matches on iPlayer, with 18 intended for BBC One or BBC Two.

In October 2024, a five-year deal with Sky Sports and the BBC worth £65 million was agreed upon by the WSL, an increase from the estimated £7–8 million per season, and the first long-term agreement with broadcasters. As the main investor, Sky Sports are to broadcast 118 live matches per season, the BBC have committed to 21 matches, with the remaining games available on YouTube.

=== International ===
For countries and regions without broadcast rights, all WSL matches are available on YouTube.

Country	Broadcaster
Africa	Azam TV
Belgium (Note: Also available via Prime Video)	W-Sport
France	W-Sport
Hong Kong	W-Sport
Indonesia	W-Sport
Lithuania	W-Sport
Malaysia	W-Sport
Mozambique	W-Sport
Portugal	W-Sport
Singapore	W-Sport
Thailand	W-Sport
Turkey	W-Sport
Netherlands	W-Sport
Netherlands	Ziggo Sport
Australia	Stan Sport
Austria	Sportdigital
Germany	Sportdigital
Liechtenstein	Sportdigital
Luxembourg	Sportdigital
Switzerland	Sportdigital
Bangladesh	FanCode
India	FanCode
Maldives	FanCode
Nepal	FanCode
Sri Lanka	FanCode
Brazil	Canal GOAT
Brazil	X-Sports
Canada	Rogers
China	Huya Live
China	Migu
Costa Rica	Fox
El Salvador	Fox
Guatemala	Fox
Honduras	Fox
Mexico	Fox
Nicaragua	Fox
Panama	Fox
Czech Republic	Canal+
Slovakia	Canal+
Greece	ERT
Hong Kong	beIN Sports
South East Asia	beIN Sports
Israel	Charlton
Italy	Sky Sport
Japan	U-Next
Kazakhstan	Quest Media
Kyrgyzstan	Quest Media
Tajikistan	Quest Media
Turkmenistan	Quest Media
Uzbekistan	Quest Media
Malta	TSN
MENA	Dubai Sports
New Zealand	Sky Sport
Norway	VG
Poland	Polsat Sport
South Korea	ENA Sports
Spain	Eleven TV
Spain	Movistar+
Sweden	SVT
Sweden	TV4
Ukraine	Maincast
United States	CBS Sports

== See also ==
- Women's Super League records and statistics
- List of Women's Super League clubs
