= Colchester United L.F.C. =

English ladies football team

Colchester United Ladies
- Full name: Colchester United Ladies Football Club
- Nickname: The U's
- Founded: 1992
- Dissolved: 2013
- Ground: Broad Lane, Wivenhoe
- Capacity: 3,000 approx.
- Chairman: Steve Downey
- Manager: Steve Downey
- League: FA Women's Premier League Southern Division
- 2011–12: 2nd, FA Women's Premier League Southern Division
Home colours	Away colours

Colchester United Ladies Football Club was an English ladies football team based in Colchester, Essex, and affiliated to Colchester United FC. In 2013, the club folded.

== History ==
The club was founded in 1992 under the name of Colchester Royals. In 1998, it became affiliated to Colchester United FC.

The club won the 2006/07 South East Combination Women's Football League winning promotion to the FA Women's Premier League Southern Division, the second tier of English women's football.

The club folded in 2013 and no longer competes in any football league.

== Honours ==
League

- South East Combination Women's Football League
  - Champions: 2006/07
- Eastern Region Premier Division
  - Champions: 2001/02, 2004/05
- Eastern Region League Division One
  - Runners-up: 1996/97
- Eastern Region League Division Two
  - Champions: 1993/94
- Essex County Women's League Division Two
  - Champions: 2002/03

Cup

- Eastern Region League Cup
  - Runners-up: 1998/99, 2004/05
- Eastern Region Women's League Plate
  - Champions: 1994/95
- Essex County FA Women's Cup
  - Runners-up: 1998/99, 2001/02, 2002/03
- Lisa Slater Memorial Shield Winners
  - Champions: 1995/96

== Reformed women's team ==
In May 2023, Colchester United Community Foundation released plans to reform a women's team in time for the 2023/24 season.

Trials were held in June and July 2023, with successful players being informed of their position on 6 July.

The founding of newly-named Colchester United Women Football Club was confirmed at Colchester United's Annual Open Day held at Colchester Community Stadium on 16 July.

The reformed team play home matches in the city at Colchester Garrison B Ground, Circular Road North, Colchester, CO2 7SZ.
