= 2002–03 Arsenal L.F.C. season =

English women's football club season

Arsenal Ladies
2002–03 season
- Chairman: Peter Hill-Wood
- Manager: Vic Akers
- Stadium: Clarence Park
- Premier League: Third Place
- FA Cup: Semi finals
- Premier League Cup: Runners up
- UEFA Cup: Semi finals
- Community Shield: Runners up
- London County Cup: Semi finals
- Top goalscorer: League: Jayne Ludlow (15); All: Jayne Ludlow (31)
- Biggest win: 11–0 (vs Sheffield Wednesday (H), Premier League Cup, 13 October 2002)
- Biggest defeat: 1–5 (vs Fortuna Hjørring, UEFA Cup (H), 27 April 2003)
| Home colours | Away colours | Third colours |

The 2002–03 season was Arsenal Ladies Football Club's 16th season since forming in 1987. The club participated in the National Division of the FA Women's Premier League, and came into the season as the reigning champions. However, they were only able to finish third this time. behind Doncaster Rovers Belles and newly promoted Fulham, who won the league with an unbeaten campaign.

They were defeated in the Community Shield and the League Cup Final on penalties by Fulham, and lost at the Semi Final stages of the FA Cup and London County Cup to Charlton Athletic.

In Europe, Arsenal reached the semi final stages of the UEFA Cup for the first time, but were thrashed 8–2 on aggregate by Fortuna Hjørring, including a disastrous 5–1 home defeat. It was the first time since 1995-96 that Arsenal finished a season with no major trophies to show for their efforts.

Before the season began, Arsenal declared that they had gone semi-professional.

== Squad information & statistics ==
=== First team squad ===
Squad statistics correct as of May 2003

| Squad No. | Name | Date of birth (age) | Since | Signed from |
Goalkeepers
| 1 | (Republic of Ireland) Emma Byrne | 14 June 1979 (aged 24) | 2000 | (Denmark) Fortuna Hjørring |
| 13 | (Wales) Jo Price | 7 June 1985 (aged 18) | 2001 | (England) Arsenal Academy |
| | (Scotland) Caroline Collie | 11 August 1986 (aged 16) | 2002 | (England) Arsenal Academy |
| | (England) Jasmine Cripps | 4 November 1985 (aged 17) | 1998 | (England) Arsenal Academy |
Defenders
| 2 | (England) Kirsty Pealling | 14 April 1975 (aged 28) | 1987 | (England) Arsenal Academy |
| 3 | (Scotland) Pauline MacDonald | 17 April 1975 (aged 28) | 1999 | (Scotland) Cumbernauld United |
| 5 | (England) Leanne Champ | 10 August 1983 (aged 19) | 2001 | (England) Millwall Lionesses |
| 6 | (England) Faye White | 2 February 1978 (aged 25) | 1996 | (England) Three Bridges |
| 11 | (England) Clare Wheatley | 4 February 1971 (aged 32) | 1995 | (England) Chelsea |
| 12 | (England) Julie Fletcher | 28 September 1974 (aged 28) | 2001 | (England) Charlton Athletic |
| 15 | (Republic of Ireland) Yvonne Tracy | 27 February 1981 (aged 22) | 2000 | (Republic of Ireland) St Patrick's Athletic |
| 17 | (England) Hayley Kemp | 23 June 1987 (aged 16) | 1998 | (England) Hatfield Youth |
| 18 | (England) Anita Asante | 27 April 1985 (aged 18) | 1998 | (England) Arsenal Academy |
| 24 | (England) Georgie Adams | 7 November 1984 (aged 18) | 1999 | (England) Bushey |
| 30 | (England) Carol Harwood | 1 December 1965 (aged 37) | 2002 | (England) Southampton Saints |
| | (England) Kelley Few | 17 October 1971 (aged 31) | 1991 | (England) Romford |
| | (Saint Lucia) Eartha Pond | 4 September 1983 (aged 19) | 2002 | (England) Chelsea |
| | (England) Cori Daniels | 4 June 1986 (aged 17) | 2002 | (England) Charlton Athletic |
| | (England) Laura Husselbee | | 2002 | (England) Wolverhampton Wanderers |
Midfielders
| 4 | (Wales) Jayne Ludlow | 7 January 1979 (aged 24) | 2000 | (England) Southampton Saints |
| 7 | (England) Sian Williams (c) | 2 February 1968 (aged 35) | 1990 | (England) Millwall Lionesses |
| 10 | (Republic of Ireland) Ciara Grant | 17 May 1978 (aged 25) | 1998 | (Republic of Ireland) St Patrick's Athletic |
| 14 | (England) Gemma Ritchie | 25 March 1983 (aged 20) | 2002 | (England) Southampton Saints |
| 21 | (England) Emma Thomas | 17 October 1983 (aged 19) | 1996 | (England) Arsenal Academy |
| | (Republic of Ireland) Carol Conlon | 9 January 1979 (aged 21) | 1998 | (Republic of Ireland) St Patrick's Athletic |
| | (Northern Ireland) Alana Livingstone | 17 November 1974 (aged 28) | 2001 | (England) Arsenal Academy |
| | (England) Lisa Burrows | 1 August 1985 (aged 17) | 2002 | (England) Bushey Rangers |
| | (England) Leanne Small | 29 September 1982 (aged 18) | 2000 | (England) Watford |
Forwards
| 8 | (England) Angela Banks | 23 December 1975 (aged 27) | 1999 | (England) Whitehawk |
| 9 | (England) Ellen Maggs | 16 February 1983 (aged 20) | 1997 | (England) Arsenal Academy |
| 16 | (England) Alex Scott | 14 October 1984 (aged 18) | 2000 | (England) Arsenal Academy |
| 17 | (Wales) Ayshea Martyn | 5 March 1974 (aged 29) | 2002 | (Wales) Bangor City |
| 20 | (England) Sheuneen Ta | 21 July 1985 (aged 17) | 1997 | (England) Arsenal Academy |
| 22 | (England) Lianne Sanderson | 3 February 1988 (aged 15) | 2003 | (England) Arsenal Academy |
| 24 | (Republic of Ireland) Michele O'Brien | 28 June 1980 (aged 23) | 2003 | (United States) Long Island Lady Riders |
| | (England) Mikaela Howell | 12 July 1988 (aged 14) | 1999 | (England) Southampton Women |
| | (England) Nicole Emmanuel | 4 June 1986 (aged 17) | 2002 | (England) Arsenal Academy |
| | (England) Rochelle Shakes | | 2003 | (England) Arsenal Academy |
| | Coreen Brown | | 2003 | (England) Arsenal Academy |

=== Appearances and goals ===
| No. | Name | PLND | | FA Cup | | PL Cup | | LC Cup | | Comm Shield | | UEFA Cup | | Total | |
| No. | Name | Apps | Goals | Apps | Goals | Apps | Goals | Apps | Goals | Apps | Goals | Apps | Goals | Apps | Goals |
Goalkeepers
| 1 | (Republic of Ireland) Emma Byrne | 18 | 0 | 4 | 0 | 5 | 0 | 0 | 0 | 1 | 0 | 6 | 0 | 34 | 0 |
| 13 | (Wales) Jo Price | 0 | 0 | 0 | 0 | 0 | 0 | 0 | 0 | 0 | 0 | 0 | 0 | 0 | 0 |
| | (Scotland) Caroline Collie | 0 | 0 | 0 | 0 | 0 | 0 | 1 | 0 | 0 | 0 | 0 | 0 | 1 | 0 |
| | (England) Jasmine Cripps | 0 | 0 | 0 | 0 | 0 | 0 | 0+1 | 0 | 0 | 0 | 0 | 0 | 0+1 | 0 |
Defenders
| 2 | (England) Kirsty Pealling | 15 | 2 | 4 | 0 | 4 | 0 | 0 | 0 | 1 | 0 | 5 | 0 | 29 | 2 |
| 3 | (Scotland) Pauline MacDonald | 10 | 2 | 4 | 0 | 3 | 0 | 0 | 0 | 1 | 0 | 3+1 | 1 | 21+1 | 3 |
| 5 | (England) Leanne Champ | 18 | 0 | 4 | 0 | 4 | 0 | 0 | 0 | 1 | 0 | 4+1 | 0 | 31+1 | 0 |
| 6 | (England) Faye White | 4+1 | 1 | 0 | 0 | 0 | 0 | 0 | 0 | 1 | 0 | 3 | 1 | 8+1 | 2 |
| 11 | (England) Clare Wheatley | 18 | 0 | 4 | 0 | 5 | 0 | 0 | 0 | 1 | 0 | 6 | 2 | 34 | 2 |
| 12 | (England) Julie Fletcher | 14+3 | 0 | 4 | 0 | 3 | 0 | 0 | 0 | 0+1 | 0 | 6 | 0 | 27+4 | 0 |
| 15 | (Republic of Ireland) Yvonne Tracy | 12+1 | 0 | 4 | 0 | 5 | 0 | 0 | 0 | 0 | 0 | 3+2 | 0 | 24+3 | 0 |
| 17 | (England) Hayley Kemp | 0+1 | 0 | 0 | 0 | 0 | 0 | 1 | 0 | 0 | 0 | 0 | 0 | 1+1 | 0 |
| 18 | (England) Anita Asante | 1+4 | 0 | 0+1 | 0 | 1+1 | 0 | 1 | 0 | 0 | 0 | 2 | 0 | 5+6 | 0 |
| 24 | (England) Georgie Adams | 0 | 0 | 0 | 0 | 0 | 0 | 0 | 0 | 0 | 0 | 0 | 0 | 0 | 0 |
| 30 | (England) Carol Harwood | 0 | 0 | 0 | 0 | 0 | 0 | 0 | 0 | 0 | 0 | 0 | 0 | 0 | 0 |
| | (Saint Lucia) Eartha Pond | 0 | 0 | 0 | 0 | 0 | 0 | 0 | 0 | 0 | 0 | 0 | 0 | 0 | 0 |
| | (England) Kelley Few | 0 | 0 | 0 | 0 | 0 | 0 | 0 | 0 | 0 | 0 | 0 | 0 | 0 | 0 |
| | (England) Cori Daniels | 0 | 0 | 0 | 0 | 0 | 0 | 1 | 0 | 0 | 0 | 0 | 0 | 1 | 0 |
| | (England) Laura Husselbee | 0 | 0 | 0 | 0 | 0 | 0 | 1 | 0 | 0 | 0 | 0 | 0 | 1 | 0 |
Midfielders
| 4 | (Wales) Jayne Ludlow | 18 | 15 | 4 | 6 | 5 | 6 | 0 | 0 | 1 | 0 | 6 | 4 | 34 | 31 |
| 7 | (England) Sian Williams (c) | 14+3 | 0 | 1+2 | 0 | 3+2 | 0 | 0 | 0 | 1 | 0 | 5 | 0 | 15+3 | 0 |
| 10 | (Republic of Ireland) Ciara Grant | 16 | 7 | 3 | 1 | 5 | 2 | 0 | 0 | 1 | 0 | 6 | 2 | 31 | 12 |
| 21 | (England) Emma Thomas | 0 | 0 | 0 | 0 | 0 | 0 | 1 | 2 | 0 | 0 | 0 | 0 | 1 | 2 |
| | (Republic of Ireland) Carol Conlon | 0 | 0 | 0 | 0 | 0 | 0 | 0 | 0 | 0 | 0 | 0 | 0 | 0 | 0 |
| | (Northern Ireland) Alana Livingstone | 0 | 0 | 0 | 0 | 0 | 0 | 0 | 0 | 0 | 0 | 0 | 0 | 0 | 0 |
| | (England) Lisa Burrows | 0 | 0 | 0+1 | 0 | 0+1 | 0 | 1 | 2 | 0 | 0 | 0 | 0 | 1+2 | 2 |
| | (England) Gemma Ritchie | 0+1 | 0 | 0 | 0 | 1 | 1 | 0 | 0 | 0 | 0 | 0+1 | 0 | 1+2 | 1 |
Forwards
| 8 | (England) Angela Banks | 18 | 14 | 4 | 2 | 5 | 3 | 0 | 0 | 0 | 0 | 5 | 4 | 32 | 23 |
| 9 | (England) Ellen Maggs | 16+1 | 5 | 2 | 0 | 3 | 3 | 0 | 0 | 1 | 2 | 6 | 3 | 28+1 | 13 |
| 14 | (England) Lianne Sanderson | 2+3 | 4 | 0 | 0 | 0 | 0 | 1 | 0 | 0 | 0 | 0+1 | 0 | 3+4 | 4 |
| 16 | (England) Alex Scott | 1+10 | 0 | 0+3 | 1 | 1+3 | 0 | 1 | 0 | 0 | 0 | 0+3 | 1 | 3+19 | 2 |
| 17 | (Wales) Ayshea Martyn | 2+8 | 1 | 2+2 | 1 | 1+3 | 1 | 0 | 0 | 1 | 0 | 0+2 | 0 | 6+15 | 3 |
| 24 | (Republic of Ireland) Michele O'Brien | 1+5 | 1 | 0 | 0 | 0 | 0 | 1 | 1 | 0 | 0 | 0+1 | 0 | 2+6 | 2 |
| | (England) Sheuneen Ta | 0 | 0 | 0 | 0 | 0+1 | 0 | 1 | 0 | 0 | 0 | 0 | 0 | 1+1 | 0 |
| | (England) Mikaela Howell | 0 | 0 | 0 | 0 | 0 | 0 | 0 | 0 | 0 | 0 | 0 | 0 | 0 | 0 |
| | (England) Nicole Emmanuel | 0 | 0 | 0 | 0 | 0 | 0 | 0 | 0 | 0 | 0 | 0 | 0 | 0 | 0 |
| | (England) Rochelle Shakes | 0 | 0 | 0 | 0 | 0 | 0 | 0+1 | 1 | 0 | 0 | 0 | 0 | 0+1 | 1 |
| | Coreen Brown | 0 | 0 | 0 | 0 | 0 | 0 | 0+1 | 0 | 0 | 0 | 0 | 0 | 0+1 | 0 |

=== Goalscorers ===
| Rank | No. | Position | Name | PLND | FA Cup | PL Cup | LC Cup | Comm Shield | UEFA Cup | Total |
|---|---|---|---|---|---|---|---|---|---|---|
| 1 | 4 | MF | (Wales) Jayne Ludlow | 15 | 6 | 6 | 0 | 0 | 4 | 31 |
| 2 | 8 | FW | (England) Angela Banks | 14 | 2 | 3 | 0 | 0 | 4 | 23 |
| 3 | 9 | FW | (England) Ellen Maggs | 5 | 0 | 3 | 0 | 2 | 3 | 13 |
| 4 | 10 | MF | (Republic of Ireland) Ciara Grant | 7 | 1 | 2 | 0 | 0 | 2 | 12 |
| 5 | 14 | FW | (England) Lianne Sanderson | 4 | 0 | 0 | 0 | 0 | 0 | 4 |
| 6 | 17 | FW | (Wales) Ayshea Martyn | 1 | 1 | 1 | 0 | 0 | 0 | 3 |
| 6 | 3 | DF | (Scotland) Pauline MacDonald | 2 | 0 | 0 | 0 | 0 | 1 | 3 |
| 8 | 16 | FW | (England) Alex Scott | 0 | 1 | 0 | 0 | 0 | 1 | 2 |
| 8 | 2 | DF | (England) Kirsty Pealling | 2 | 0 | 0 | 0 | 0 | 0 | 2 |
| 8 | 6 | DF | (England) Faye White | 1 | 0 | 0 | 0 | 0 | 1 | 2 |
| 8 | 11 | DF | (England) Clare Wheatley | 0 | 0 | 0 | 0 | 0 | 2 | 2 |
| 8 | 24 | FW | (Republic of Ireland) Michele O'Brien | 1 | 0 | 0 | 1 | 0 | 0 | 2 |
| 8 | 21 | MF | (England) Emma Thomas | 0 | 0 | 0 | 2 | 0 | 0 | 2 |
| 8 | | MF | (England) Lisa Burrows | 0 | 0 | 0 | 2 | 0 | 0 | 2 |
| 15 | | MF | (England) Gemma Ritchie | 0 | 0 | 1 | 0 | 0 | 0 | 1 |
| 15 | | FW | (England) Rochelle Shakes | 0 | 0 | 0 | 1 | 10 | 0 | 1 |
| Own goal | | | | 1 | 1 | 2 | 1 | 0 | 0 | 5 |
| Total | | | | 53 | 12 | 18 | 7 | 2 | 18 | 110 |

=== Clean sheets ===
| Rank | No. | Name | PLND | FA Cup | PL Cup | LC Cup | Comm Shield | UEFA Cup | Total |
|---|---|---|---|---|---|---|---|---|---|
| 1 | 1 | (Republic of Ireland) Emma Byrne | 5 | 3 | 3 | 0 | 0 | 3 | 14 |
| 2 | | (Scotland) Caroline Collie | 0 | 0 | 0 | 1 | 0 | 0 | 1 |
| Total | | | 5 | 3 | 3 | 1 | 0 | 3 | 15 |

== Transfers, loans and other signings ==
=== Transfers in ===
| Announcement date | No. | Position | Player | From club |
|---|---|---|---|---|
| 2002 | 17 | FW | (Wales) Ayshea Martyn | (Wales) Bangor City |
| 2002 | | MF | (England) Gemma Ritchie | (England) Southampton Saints |
| 2002 | | MF | (England) Lisa Burrows | (England) Bushey Rangers |
| 2002 | | DF | (England) Laura Husselbee | (England) Wolverhampton Wanderers |
| 2002 | | DF | (England) Cori Daniels | (England) Charlton Athletic |
| 2003 | 24 | FW | (Republic of Ireland) Michele O'Brien | (United States) Long Island Lady Riders |

=== Transfers out ===
| Announcement date | No. | Position | Player | To club |
|---|---|---|---|---|
| 2 July 2002 | N/A | FW | (England) Marieanne Spacey | (England) Fulham |
| 10 July 2002 | N/A | DF | (England) Casey Stoney | (England) Charlton Athletic |
| July 2002 | N/A | DF | (England) Jessica Wright | (England) Fulham |
| 2002 | N/A | GK | (England) Aman Dosanj | (United States) Lee University |
| 2002 | N/A | MF | (Scotland) Nicky Grant | (Scotland) Glasgow City |
| 2002 | N/A | DF | (Saint Lucia) Eartha Pond | (England) Charlton Athletic |
| 2002 | N/A | GK | (England) Toni-Anne Wayne | (England) Southampton Saints |
| 2002 | N/A | MF | (England) Emma Coss | (England) Charlton Athletic |
| 2002 | N/A | FW | (Japan) Megumi Ogawa | |
| 2002 | N/A | FW | (England) Emma Moore | |
| 2002 | N/A | MF | (England) Jo Gardiner | |
| 2002 | N/A | | (Japan) Momo Nakaike | |

== Club ==
=== Kit ===
Supplier: Nike / Sponsor: O2.

| Home | Away | Third |

== Non-competitive ==
=== Pre-season ===
| 21 July 2002 | Wimbledon | 8–0 | Arsenal |
| | | Report |

| 24 July 2002 | Arsenal | 6–0 | Millwall Lionesses |
| | | Report |

| 28 July 2002 | Wolverhampton Wanderers | 0–6 | Arsenal |
| | | Report |

| 1 August 2002 | Arsenal | 5–0 | University of Alabama |
| | | Report |

| 15 August 2002 | Arsenal | 4–2 | Japanese College |
| | | Report |

| 18 August 2002 | University of Nebraska | 0–1 | Arsenal |
| | | Report |

| 20 August 2002 | University of Minnesota | 0–11 | Arsenal |
| | | Report |

| 28 August 2002 | Arsenal | 3–1 | London CR |
| | | Report |

=== Charity match ===
| 8 March 2003 | Nigeria Falcons | 5–1 | Arsenal | Surulere |
| | (pen.) | Report | O'Brien | Stadium: National Stadium |

== Competitions ==
=== Overall record ===
| Competition | First match | Last match | Starting round | Final position | Record | | | | | | | |
| Competition | First match | Last match | Starting round | Final position | Pld | W | D | L | GF | GA | GD | Win % |
|---|---|---|---|---|---|---|---|---|---|---|---|---|
| FA Women's Premier League National Division | 31 August 2002 | 11 May 2003 | Matchday 1 | 3rd | 18 | 13 | 1 | 4 | 53 | 21 | +32 | 72.22 |
| FA Women's Cup | 5 January 2003 | 23 March 2003 | Fourth round | Semi-finals | 4 | 3 | 0 | 1 | 12 | 1 | +11 | 75.00 |
| FA Women's Premier League Cup | 13 October 2002 | 30 March 2003 | First round | Runners-up | 5 | 4 | 1 | 0 | 18 | 2 | +16 | 80.00 |
| UEFA Women's Cup | 24 September 2002 | 27 April 2003 | Qualifying round | Semi-finals | 7 | 4 | 1 | 2 | 20 | 10 | +10 | 57.14 |
| FA Women's Community Shield | 8 August 2002 | | Final | Runners-up | 1 | 0 | 1 | 0 | 2 | 2 | +0 | 0.00 |
| London County Cup | 28 January 2003 | 19 March 2003 | First round | Semi-finals | 2 | 1 | 0 | 1 | 7 | 2 | +5 | 50.00 |
| Total | | | | | 37 | 25 | 4 | 8 | 112 | 38 | +74 | 67.57 |

Last updated: 24 May 2026
Source: FA WPL

=== FA Women's Community Shield ===
| 8 August 2002 Final | Arsenal | 2–2 (a.e.t.) (1–3 p) | Fulham | Leyton |
| 19:35 BST | Maggs 8', 73' | Report | Duncan 1'; Chapman 11' | Stadium: Brisbane Road |
| | Penalties |
| | Ludlow (penalty missed); Wheatley (penalty missed); Champ (penalty scored); White (penalty missed) | | (penalty scored) Pedersen; (penalty missed) Haugenes; (penalty scored) McArthur; (penalty scored) Phillip |

=== FA Women's Premier League National Division ===
==== Partial league table ====
| Pos | Team | Pld | W | D | L | GF | GA | GD | Pts | Qualification or relegation |
|---|---|---|---|---|---|---|---|---|---|---|
| 1 | Fulham (C) | 18 | 16 | 2 | 0 | 63 | 13 | +50 | 49 (Note: Deducted 1 point for fielding ineligible player (Jess Wright) against Charlton Athletic on October 23, 2002.) | Qualification for the UEFA Cup qualifying round |
| 2 | Doncaster Belles | 18 | 13 | 2 | 3 | 34 | 19 | +15 | 41 | |
| 3 | Arsenal | 18 | 13 | 1 | 4 | 53 | 21 | +32 | 40 | |
| 4 | Charlton Athletic | 18 | 10 | 4 | 4 | 44 | 20 | +24 | 34 | |
| 5 | Birmingham City | 18 | 6 | 3 | 9 | 26 | 31 | −5 | 21 | |

Source: FA WPL
(C) Champions

==== Results summary ====
| Overall | | | | | | | | Home | | | | | | Away | | | | | |
| Pld | W | D | L | GF | GA | GD | Pts | W | D | L | GF | GA | GD | W | D | L | GF | GA | GD |
|---|---|---|---|---|---|---|---|---|---|---|---|---|---|---|---|---|---|---|---|
| 18 | 13 | 1 | 4 | 53 | 21 | +32 | 40 | 7 | 0 | 2 | 28 | 9 | +19 | 6 | 1 | 2 | 25 | 12 | +13 |

==== Results by matchday ====
| Matchday | 1 | 2 | 3 | 4 | 5 | 6 | 7 | 8 | 9 | 10 | 11 | 12 | 13 | 14 | 15 | 16 | 17 | 18 |
|---|---|---|---|---|---|---|---|---|---|---|---|---|---|---|---|---|---|---|
| Ground | H | A | H | H | H | A | H | H | A | H | H | A | A | A | A | A | H | A |
| Result | W | W | W | W | W | L | L | W | W | W | W | L | W | W | W | D | L | W |
| Position | 5 | 4 | 2 | 2 | 2 | 2 | 3 | 3 | 3 | 3 | 4 | 4 | 3 | 3 | 3 | 3 | 3 | 3 |

Source: FA WPL
W = Win; D = Draw; L = Loss

==== Matches ====
| 31 August 2002 1 | Arsenal | 6–0 | Tranmere Rovers | St Albans |
| 15:00 BST | Banks; Ludlow; Grant; Maggs | Report | | Stadium: Clarence Park |

| 8 September 2002 2 | Leeds United | 3–6 | Arsenal | Garforth |
| | Thorpe (pen.); Burke | Report | Banks; Ludlow 51'; Champ (yellow card) (yellow-red card) | Stadium: Wheatley Park |

| 11 September 2002 3 | Arsenal | 5–0 | Birmingham City | Finchley |
| 19:30 BST | Ludlow 7', 65', 74'; Grant 27', 83' | Report | | Stadium: The Harry Abrahams Stadium |

| 6 October 2002 4 | Arsenal | 3–2 | Everton | St Albans |
| 11:30 BST | MacDonald 11'; Banks 16'; Maggs 58' | Report | Szyluk 3', 25' | Stadium: Clarence Park; Referee: Terry Coates |

| 20 October 2002 5 | Arsenal | 4–1 | Brighton & Hove Albion | St Albans |
| 14:00 GMT | White 28'; Banks (penalty missed) 36 40'; Maggs 70'; Ludlow 80' | Report | Waine 75' | Stadium: Clarence Park |

| 23 October 2002 6 | Birmingham City | 1–0 | Arsenal | Redditch |
| 19:45 BST | Ward 21' (pen.) | Report | | Stadium: Valley Stadium |

| 7 November 2002 7 | Arsenal | 1–2 | Fulham | St Albans |
| 19:45 GMT | Martyn 84' | Report | Moore 45', 83' | Stadium: Clarence Park; Referee: David Thomas |

| 8 December 2002 8 | Arsenal | 3–1 | Doncaster Belles | St Albans |
| | 44' (o.g.); Grant 58'; MacDonald 70' | Report | Exley 2' | Stadium: Clarence Park |

| 16 February 2003 9 | Everton | 0–1 | Arsenal | Crosby |
| 12:30 GMT | | Report | Banks 50' (pen.) | Stadium: Rossett Park |

| 2 March 2003 10 | Arsenal | 1–0 | Southampton Saints | St Albans |
| 14:00 GMT | Banks 73' | Report | | Stadium: Clarence Park |

| 12 April 2003 11 | Arsenal | 4–1 | Leeds United | Potters Bar |
| 14:00 BST | Grant 12'; Maggs; Pealling 73'; Ludlow 86' | Report | Daniel 65' | Stadium: The Lantern Stadium |

| 15 April 2003 12 | Fulham | 4–1 | Arsenal | Carshalton |
| 19:45 BST | Yankey 7', 85'; Haugenes 50'; Champ 81' (o.g.) | Report | Sanderson 90+3' | Stadium: War Memorial Sports Ground |

| 20 April 2003 13 | Tranmere Rovers | 1–7 | Arsenal | Heswall |
| 14:00 BST | Preston 44' | Report | Banks; Grant; Ludlow; Sanderson | Stadium: Gayton Park |

| 23 April 2003 14 | Brighton & Hove Albion | 1–5 | Arsenal | Three Bridges |
| 19:30 BST | Whitton | Report | Banks; Ludlow; Maggs; Sanderson | Stadium: Jubilee Field |

| 30 April 2003 15 | Southampton Saints | 1–3 | Arsenal | Marchwood |
| 19:00 BST | Bell 30' | Report | Ludlow 48'; O'Brien 56'; Banks 67' | Stadium: Staplewood Campus |

| 4 May 2003 16 | Doncaster Belles | 1–1 | Arsenal | Woodlands |
| 12:00 BST | K. Walker 85' | Report | Pealling 90' | Stadium: Welfare Ground |

| 8 May 2003 17 | Arsenal | 1–2 | Charlton Athletic | Highbury |
| 20:00 BST | Banks | Report | Barr 9'; C. Walker 82' | Stadium: Highbury |

| 11 May 2003 18 | Charlton Athletic | 0–1 | Arsenal | Eltham |
| 11:00 BST | | Report | Banks 41' | Stadium: Sparrows Lane |

=== FA Women's Cup ===
| 5 January 2003 Fourth round | Arsenal | 2–0 | Tranmere Rovers | St Albans |
| | Grant 14'; Ludlow 90' | Report | | Stadium: Clarence Park |

| 26 January 2003 Fifth round | Wolverhampton Wanderers | 0–4 | Arsenal |
| | | Report | Ludlow; Banks |

| 8 February 2003 Quarter-finals | Arsenal | 6–0 | Aston Villa | Bishop's Stortford |
| 14:00 GMT | Banks 10', 54'; Pealling 18'; Ludlow 33', 78'; Scott 83' | Report | | Stadium: Woodside Park |

| 23 March 2003 Semi-finals | Charlton Athletic | 1–0 | Arsenal | Charlton |
| 12:00 GMT | Walker (yellow card) 76'; Lorton 80' (pen.) | Report | Pealling (yellow card) 38' (yellow-red card) 86'; Champ (yellow card) 42' | Stadium: The Valley; Attendance: 3,031; Referee: Wendy Toms |

=== FA Women's Premier League Cup ===
| 13 October 2002 First round | Arsenal | 11–0 | Sheffield Wednesday | St Albans |
| 14:15 BST | Ludlow; Banks; Maggs; Ritchie; (o.g.) | Report | | Stadium: Clarence Park |

| 10 November 2002 Second round | Arsenal | 3–0 | Leeds United | Potters Bar |
| 14:00 GMT | Britton 7' (o.g.); Grant 18'; Maggs 60' | Report | | Stadium: The Lantern Stadium; Referee: John Farries |

| 1 December 2002 Quarter-finals | Arsenal | 1–0 | Tranmere Rovers | St Albans |
| | Martyn 17' | Report | | Stadium: Clarence Park |

| 2 February 2003 Semi-finals | Doncaster Belles | 1–2 | Arsenal | Woodlands |
| 19:30 GMT | K. Walker 67' (pen.) | Report | Ludlow 3', 23'; Champ (yellow card) (yellow-red card) 65' | Stadium: Welfare Stadium |

| 30 March 2003 Final | Fulham | 1–1 (a.e.t.) (3–2 p) | Arsenal | Swindon |
| 14:15 BST | McArthur (yellow card) 72'; Yankey 89' | Report | Champ (yellow card) 28'; Grant 90' | Stadium: County Ground; Attendance: 2,220 |
| | Penalties |
| | Pedersen (penalty missed); Spacey (penalty scored); Yankey (penalty missed); Unitt (penalty missed); McArthur (penalty scored); Jerray-Silver (penalty scored) | | (penalty scored) Banks; (penalty scored) Wheatley; (penalty missed) Fletcher; (penalty missed) Pealling; (penalty missed) Williams; (penalty missed) Maggs |

=== London County Cup ===
| 28 January 2003 First Round | Arsenal | 7–0 | Crystal Palace | Potters Bar |
| 19:45 GMT | Thomas; Burrows; O'Brien; Shakes (pen.); (o.g.) | Report | | Stadium: The Lantern Stadium; Referee: C. Hall |

| 19 March 2003 Semi Finals | Arsenal | 0–2 | Charlton Athletic | Edgware |
| 19:30 GMT | | Report | Farmer 15'; C. Walker 80' | Stadium: White Lion Ground |

=== UEFA Women's Cup ===
==== Qualifying round ====
| Pos | Team | Pld | W | D | L | GF | GA | GD | Pts | Qualification | ARS | LEV | GBA | EEN |
|---|---|---|---|---|---|---|---|---|---|---|---|---|---|---|
| 1 | (England) Arsenal (H) | 3 | 3 | 0 | 0 | 15 | 1 | +14 | 9 | Advance to quarter-finals | — | 2–1 | 6–0 | 7–0 |
| 2 | (Spain) Levante | 3 | 2 | 0 | 1 | 11 | 3 | +8 | 6 | | – | — | 2–1 | – |
| 3 | (Azerbaijan) Gömrükçü Baku | 3 | 1 | 0 | 2 | 9 | 8 | +1 | 3 | | – | – | — | – |
| 4 | (Belgium) Eendracht Aalst | 3 | 0 | 0 | 3 | 0 | 23 | −23 | 0 | | – | 0–8 | 0–8 | — |

Source: RSSSF
(H) Hosts

| 24 September 2002 1 | Arsenal (England) | 6–0 | (Azerbaijan) Gömrükçü Baku | St Albans |
| 20:00 BST | Wheatley 5', 84'; Banks 21', 40'; Grant 45'; Ludlow 86' | Report | Milchevskaya (yellow card) 90+3' | Stadium: Clarence Park |

| 26 September 2002 2 | Arsenal (England) | 2–1 | (Spain) Levante | Bishop's Stortford |
| 20:00 BST | Maggs 11'; Ludlow (yellow card) 26'; Wheatley (yellow card) 40'; White 62'; Champ (yellow card) 88' | Report | Prieto 15'; Castillo (yellow card) 49'; Nohalez (yellow card) 79' | Stadium: Woodside Park |

| 29 September 2002 3 | Arsenal (England) | 7–0 | (Belgium) Eendracht Aalst | St Albans |
| 12:00 BST | Ludlow 40', 57', 88'; Maggs 59', 70'; Grant 58'; Scott 65' | Report | Migom (yellow card) 59'; Goossens (yellow card) 65' | Stadium: Clarence Park |

==== Knockout phase ====
===== Quarter-finals =====
| 2 November 2002 First Leg | CSK VVS Samara (Russia) | 0–2 | (England) Arsenal | Samara |
| 14:00 GMT | Dyatchkova (yellow card) 80' | Report | Petko 5' (o.g.); MacDonald 14' | Stadium: Metallurg Stadium; Attendance: 3,000; Referee: Geja Mulder (Netherlands) |

| 28 November 2002 Second Leg | Arsenal (England) | 1–1 (3–1 agg.) | (Russia) CSK VVS Samara | St Albans |
| 19:45 GMT | Maggs 17' | Report | Kremleva 26'; Djarbolova (yellow card) 42' | Stadium: Clarence Park; Attendance: 450; Referee: Lale Orta (Turkey) |

===== Semi-finals =====
| 5 April 2003 First Leg | Fortuna Hjørring (Denmark) | 3–1 | (England) Arsenal | Hjørring |
| 13:15 BST | Knudsen (yellow card) 35'; Black 42'; Forman 48'; Bonde 66' | Report | Banks 68' | Stadium: Hjørring Stadium; Attendance: 2,384; Referee: Christine Frai (Germany) |

| 27 April 2003 Second Leg | Arsenal (England) | 1–5 (2–8 agg.) | (Denmark) Fortuna Hjørring | Barnet |
| 12:00 BST | Champ (yellow card) 29'; Maggs (yellow card) 37'; Tracy (yellow card) 47'; Banks 67'; Ludlow (yellow card) 90+1' | Report | B. Christensen 6'; Bonde 47' (pen.), 61'; Black 63'; M. K. Christensen 90+2' | Stadium: Underhill |

== See also ==
- List of Arsenal W.F.C. seasons
- 2002–03 in English football
