= 2002–03 UEFA Women's Cup qualifying round =

Tournament details
- Dates: 29 August–29 September 2002
- Teams: 35

The 2002–03 UEFA Women's Champions League qualifying round was played between 29 August and 29 September 2002. A total of 35 teams competed in the qualifying round to decide the 8 places in the knockout phase of the 2002–03 UEFA Women's Cup.

== First qualifying round ==
Pos	Team	Pld	W	D	L	GF	GA	GD	Pts	Qualification	GBA	DPR	ŠMK	LEF
1	(Azerbaijan) Gömrükçü Baku	3	3	0	0	19	0	+19	9	Advance to second qualifying round	—	–	–	–
2	(Northern Ireland) Distillery Predators	3	2	0	1	4	7	−3	6		0–7	—	1–0	–
3	(Slovenia) Škale-Mila-Krško (H)	3	1	0	2	9	5	+4	3		0–4	–	—	–
4	(Cyprus) Lefkothea	3	0	0	3	0	20	−20	0		0–8	0–3	0–9	—

Source: RSSSF
(H) Hosts
29 August 2002

Lefkothea (Cyprus)	0–9	(Slovenia) Škale-Mila-Krško
	Report	Korpič 1', 47', 75', 78', 81'; Kovačič 29'; Beričnik 51', 59'; Založnik 90+4'

Ob Jezeru City Stadium, Velenje
29 August 2002

Distillery Predators (Northern Ireland)	0–7	(Azerbaijan) Gömrükçü Baku
	Report	Girkhlarova 22'; Ivanova 38', 45'; Dyatel 51', 90'; Fedosova 55'; Khodyreva 57'

Ob Jezeru City Stadium, Velenje

31 August 2002

Distillery Predators (Northern Ireland)	1–0	(Slovenia) Škale-Mila-Krško
Bailie 90+3'	Report

Ob Jezeru City Stadium, Velenje
31 August 2002

(Cyprus) Lefkothea	0–8	Gömrükçü Baku (Azerbaijan)
	Report	Ivanova 15', 87'; Khodyreva 17', 55', 88'; Ibadullayeva 58'; Zhdanova 76'; Lemeshko 85'

Ob Jezeru City Stadium, Velenje

2 September 2002

Škale-Mila-Krško (Slovenia)	0–4	(Azerbaijan) Gömrükçü Baku
	Report	Khodyreva 12', 90+2'; Vuksanović 61' (o.g.); Lemeshko 80'

Slovenska Bistrica Sports Park, Slovenska Bistrica
2 September 2002

Lefkothea (Cyprus)	0–3	(Northern Ireland) Distillery Predators
	Report	Miniss 16'; Livingstone 37'; Bailie 85'

Ob Jezeru City Stadium, Velenje

== Second qualifying round ==
=== Group 1 ===
Pos	Team	Pld	W	D	L	GF	GA	GD	Pts	Qualification	UME	SPR	KIK	VTA
1	(Sweden) Umeå (H)	3	3	0	0	17	1	+16	9	Advance to quarter-finals	—	–	–	4–0
2	(Czech Republic) Sparta Prague	3	2	0	1	11	6	+5	6		1–6	—	4–0	6–0
3	(Faroe Islands) KÍ	3	1	0	2	2	11	−9	3		0–7	–	—	2–0
4	(Estonia) Visa Tallinn	3	0	0	3	0	12	−12	0		–	–	–	—

Source: RSSSF
(H) Hosts
25 September 2002

KÍ (Faroe Islands)	0–7	(Sweden) Umeå
	Report	Ljungberg 8', 14', 53', 63'; Runesson 35'; Lindqvist 48', 80'

Gammliavallen, Umeå
25 September 2002

Sparta Prague (Czech Republic)	6–0	(Estonia) Visa Tallinn
Došková 13', 25'; Holan 63', 75'; Knavová 72'; Mouchová 83'	Report

Gammliavallen, Umeå

27 September 2002

Umeå (Sweden)	4–0	(Estonia) Visa Tallinn
Nordbrandt 19'; Dahlqvist 49'; Ljungberg 54'; Runesson 85'	Report

Gammliavallen, Umeå
27 September 2002

Sparta Prague (Czech Republic)	4–0	(Faroe Islands) KÍ
Došková 24'; Knavová 41'; Holan 43', 58'	Report

Gammliavallen, Umeå

29 September 2002

Sparta Prague (Czech Republic)	1–6	(Sweden) Umeå
Martínková 12'	Report	Kapstad 15'; Ljungberg 17'; Moström 21'; Dahlqvist 22'; Marklund 26'; Sjöström 30'

Gammliavallen, Umeå
29 September 2002

KÍ (Faroe Islands)	2–0	(Estonia) Visa Tallinn
Josephsen 57'; Bjartalid 89'	Report

Tegstunets IP. Umeå

=== Group 2 ===
Pos	Team	Pld	W	D	L	GF	GA	GD	Pts	Qualification	TOU	LAZ	FEM	MHA
1	(France) Toulouse	3	2	1	0	11	1	+10	7	Advance to quarter-finals	—	–	1–0	9–0
2	(Italy) Lazio (H)	3	2	1	0	11	3	+8	7		1–1	—	5–2	5–0
3	(Hungary) Femina Budapest	3	1	0	2	6	6	0	3		–	–	—	4–0
4	(Israel) Maccabi Haifa	3	0	0	3	0	18	−18	0		–	–	–	—

Source: RSSSF
(H) Hosts
25 September 2002

SS Lazio (Italy)	5–0	(Israel) Maccabi Haifa
Panico 2'; Marsico 21', 58'; Zorri 44'; Frollani 66'	Report

Stadio Flaminio, Rome
25 September 2002

Toulouse (France)	1–0	(Hungary) Femina Budapest
Maugeais 90'	Report

Stadio Casal del Marmo, Rome

27 September 2002

SS Lazio (Italy)	1–1	(France) Toulouse
Lattanzi 65'	Report	Traïkia 59'

Stadio Flaminio, Rome
27 September 2002

Femina Budapest (Hungary)	4–0	(Israel) Maccabi Haifa
Ruff 19', 29'; Pádár 56'; Sebestyén 78'	Report

Stadio Casal del Marmo, Rome

29 September 2002

SS Lazio (Italy)	5–2	(Hungary) Femina Budapest
Panico 38', 68', 90+4'; Zorri 49'; Marsico 71'	Report	Pádár 36'; Lazkouszki 77'

Stadio Flaminio, Rome
29 September 2002

Toulouse (France)	9–0	(Israel) Maccabi Haifa
Traïkia 20', 43', 47', 70'; Briche 22', 26', 41', 90+2'; Maugeais 76'	Report

Stadio Tre Fontane, Rome

=== Group 3 ===
Pos	Team	Pld	W	D	L	GF	GA	GD	Pts	Qualification	FRA	MCN	SRO	OSI
1	(Germany) Frankfurt	3	3	0	0	17	1	+16	9	Advance to quarter-finals	—	–	–	8–0
2	(Federal Republic of Yugoslavia) Masinac Niš (H)	3	2	0	1	10	3	+7	6		0–2	—	4–1	6–0
3	(Republic of Ireland) Shamrock Rovers	3	1	0	2	5	12	−7	3		1–7	–	—	–
4	(Croatia) Osijek	3	0	0	3	1	17	−16	0		–	–	1–3	—

Source: RSSSF
(H) Hosts
25 September 2002

Masinac Niš (Federal Republic of Yugoslavia)	0–2	(Germany) Frankfurt
		Meier 1'; Wunderlich 53'

Čair Stadium, Niš
25 September 2002

Osijek (Croatia)	1–3	(Republic of Ireland) Shamrock Rovers
Koljenik 33'	Report	O'Toole 5'; O'Neill 48'; Kirwan 65'

Stadion kraj Carske pruge, Niš

27 September 2002

Masinac Niš (Federal Republic of Yugoslavia)	4–1	(Republic of Ireland) Shamrock Rovers
Vukčević 33'; Mladenović 56'; Stefanović 74', 79'	Report	O'Toole 45'

Čair Stadium, Niš
27 September 2002

Frankfurt (Germany)	8–0	(Croatia) Osijek
Barucha 34'; Wunderlich 40'; Meier 43', 88'; Prinz 45', 62', 72'; Jones 90'	Report

Stadion kraj Carske pruge, Niš

29 September 2002

Masinac Niš (Federal Republic of Yugoslavia)	6–0	(Croatia) Osijek
Jovanović 6', 33'; Ivanović 22', 63', 80'; Mladenović 53'	Report

Čair Stadium, Niš
29 September 2002

Shamrock Rovers (Republic of Ireland)	1–7	(Germany) Frankfurt
O'Toole 21'	Report	Jones 7', 30'; Wunderlich 26'; Barucha 42'; Woock 62'; Lingor 72'; Meier 86'

Stadion kraj Carske pruge, Niš

=== Group 4 ===
Pos	Team	Pld	W	D	L	GF	GA	GD	Pts	Qualification	HJK	SUR	WRO	BAN
1	(Finland) HJK	3	2	1	0	10	0	+10	7	Advance to quarter-finals	—	–	2–0	8–0
2	(Switzerland) Sursee	3	2	1	0	2	0	+2	7		0–0	—	1–0	1–0
3	(Poland) AZS Wrocław (H)	3	1	0	2	6	6	0	3		–	–	—	6–3
4	(Wales) Bangor City	3	0	0	3	3	15	−12	0		–	–	–	—

Source: RSSSF
(H) Hosts
25 September 2002

HJK (Finland)	2–0	(Poland) AZS Wrocław
Forssell 5'; Saaranen 86'	Report

Oporowska Stadium, Wrocław
25 September 2002

Sursee (Switzerland)	1–0	(Wales) Bangor City
Di Fonzo 41'	Report

Stadion Miejski ATOL, Oleśnica

27 September 2002

HJK (Finland)	8–0	(Wales) Bangor City
Rantanen 12', 24', 38'; Hakala 22'; Lappi-Seppälä 34'; Sarapää 41'; Williams 59' (o.g.); Saaranen 77'	Report

Stadion Miejski ATOL, Oleśnica
27 September 2002

Sursee (Switzerland)	1–0	(Poland) AZS Wrocław
Di Fonzo 78'	Report

Stadion Miejski ATOL, Oleśnica

29 September 2002

AZS Wrocław (Poland)	6–3	(Wales) Bangor City
Gibek 11', 33', 45', 48', 86'; Białasek 90'	Report	Orlik 5'; Wyn-Williams 28'; Blackmore 80'

Stadion Miejski ATOL, Oleśnica
29 September 2002

Sursee (Switzerland)	0–0	(Finland) HJK
	Report

Oporowska Stadium, Wrocław

=== Group 5 ===
Pos	Team	Pld	W	D	L	GF	GA	GD	Pts	Qualification	ØRN	SAE	REG	PAOK
1	(Norway) Trondheims-Ørn	3	3	0	0	18	0	+18	9	Advance to quarter-finals	—	2–0	–	12–0
2	(Netherlands) Saestum	3	2	0	1	10	3	+7	6		–	—	2–0	8–1
3	(Romania) Regal Bucharest	3	1	0	2	3	6	−3	3		0–4	–	—	–
4	(Greece) PAOK (H)	3	0	0	3	1	23	−22	0		–	–	0–3	—

Source: RSSSF
(H) Hosts
25 September 2002

PAOK (Greece)	0–3	(Romania) Regal Bucharest
	Report	Burtica 45'; Anton 46'; Vintilă 75'

Toumba Stadium, Thessaloniki
25 September 2002

Trondheims-Ørn (Norway)	2–0	(Netherlands) Saestum
Rønning 67'; Enlid 73'	Report

Toumba Stadium, Thessaloniki

27 September 2002

Trondheims-Ørn (Norway)	12–0	(Greece) PAOK
Nyrønning 12'; Rønning 25'; Pedersen 27', 43', 53', 60', 63'; Jordanger 46', 78'; Nordgård 52'; Andersen 81', 90'	Report

Katerini Stadium, Katerini
27 September 2002

Saestum (Netherlands)	2–0	(Romania) Regal Bucharest
Delies 44'; Smith 46'	Report

Katerini Stadium, Katerini

29 September 2002

Saestum (Netherlands)	8–1	(Greece) PAOK
Delies 3', 44', 81'; Berghorst 4'; Ran 54'; Griffioen 75', 88'; Smith 83'	Report	Lazarou 61'

Kalamaria Stadium, Kalamaria
29 September 2002

Regal Bucharest (Romania)	0–4	(Norway) Trondheims-Ørn
	Report	Nordgård 12', 52'; Rønning 56'; Andersen 76'

Litochoro Stadium, Litochoro

=== Group 6 ===
Pos	Team	Pld	W	D	L	GF	GA	GD	Pts	Qualification	FHJ	BOB	BRE	CAN
1	(Denmark) Fortuna Hjørring	3	3	0	0	17	0	+17	9	Advance to quarter-finals	—	3–0	9–0	5–0
2	(Belarus) Bobruichanka Bobruisk (H)	3	2	0	1	9	5	+4	6		–	—	3–2	6–0
3	(Iceland) Breiðablik	3	1	0	2	4	12	−8	3		–	–	—	–
4	(Moldova) Codru Anenii Noi	3	0	0	3	0	13	−13	0		–	–	0–2	—

Source: RSSSF
(H) Hosts
25 September 2002

Bobruichanka Bobruisk (Belarus)	3–2	(Iceland) Breiðablik
Astashova 18'; Nagornaya 43'; Aniskovtseva 52'	Report	Olafsdóttir 11'; Sævarsdóttir 39'

Spartak Stadium, Shklow
25 September 2002

Fortuna Hjørring (Denmark)	5–0	(Moldova) Codru Anenii Noi
Bonde 11'; Rasmussen 39'; McCormack 45'; Knudsen 72'; Christensen 76'	Report

Spartak Stadium, Mogilev

27 September 2002

Bobruichanka Bobruisk (Belarus)	6–0	(Moldova) Codru Anenii Noi
Nagornaya 24', 45+1', 77'; Stankevich 64'; Shramok 71'; Aniskovtseva 74'	Report

Spartak Stadium, Shklow
27 September 2002

Fortuna Hjørring (Denmark)	9–0	(Iceland) Breiðablik
Christensen 5', 49'; Bonde 12'; Black 14', 27'; Madsen 14', 41'; Rasmussen 71'; McCormack 90'	Report

Spartak Stadium, Mogilev

29 September 2002

Fortuna Hjørring (Denmark)	3–0	(Belarus) Bobruichanka Bobruisk
Forman 56', 67'; Madsen 75'	Report

Spartak Stadium, Shklow
29 September 2002

Codru Anenii Noi (Moldova)	0–2	(Iceland) Breiðablik
	Report	Dadadóttir 51'; Arnardóttir 76'

Spartak Stadium, Mogilev

=== Group 7 ===
Pos	Team	Pld	W	D	L	GF	GA	GD	Pts	Qualification	ARS	LEV	GBA	EEN
1	(England) Arsenal (H)	3	3	0	0	15	1	+14	9	Advance to quarter-finals	—	2–1	6–0	7–0
2	(Spain) Levante	3	2	0	1	11	3	+8	6		–	—	2–1	–
3	(Azerbaijan) Gömrükçü Baku	3	1	0	2	9	8	+1	3		–	–	—	–
4	(Belgium) Eendracht Aalst	3	0	0	3	0	23	−23	0		–	0–8	0–8	—

Source: RSSSF
(H) Hosts
25 September 2002

Arsenal (England)	6–0	(Azerbaijan) Gömrükçü Baku
Wheatley 5', 84'; Banks 21', 30'; Grant 45'; Ludlow 86'	Report

Clarence Park, London
25 September 2002

Eendracht Aalst (Belgium)	0–8	(Spain) Levante
	Report	Prieto 1', 53'; Jiménez 37', 76'; Gimbert 51'; Fuentes 62', 67', 81'

Clarence Park, London

27 September 2002

Arsenal (England)	2–1	(Spain) Levante
Maggs 11'; White 62'	Report	Prieto 14'

Woodside Park, London
27 September 2002

(Belgium) Eendracht Aalst	0–8	Gömrükçü Baku (Azerbaijan)
	Report	Ivanova 2'; Lemeshko 12', 19'; Zhdanova 22'; Migom 30' (o.g.); Khodyreva 35', 63'; Trogh 68' (o.g.)

Woodside Park, London

29 September 2002

Arsenal (England)	7–0	(Belgium) Eendracht Aalst
Ludlow 40', 57', 89'; Grant 58'; Maggs 59', 78'; Scott 63'	Report

Clarence Park, London
29 September 2002

Levante (Spain)	2–1	(Azerbaijan) Gömrükçü Baku
Fuentes 35'; Moreno 73'	Report	Lemeshko 51'

Wodson Park, Ware

=== Group 8 ===
Pos	Team	Pld	W	D	L	GF	GA	GD	Pts	Qualification	CVS	DEZ	KIL	INN
1	(Russia) CSK VVS Samara	3	2	1	0	7	0	+7	7	Advance to quarter-finals	—	3–0	–	–
2	(Portugal) 1.º de Dezembro	3	2	0	1	4	4	0	6		–	—	–	–
3	(Scotland) Kilmarnock	3	1	1	1	4	3	+1	4		0–0	0–2	—	–
4	(Austria) Innsbruck (H)	3	0	0	3	2	10	−8	0		0–4	1–2	1–4	—

Source: RSSSF
(H) Hosts
25 September 2002

Innsbruck (Austria)	1–2	(Portugal) 1.º de Dezembro
Anke Stehrer 27'	Report	Fernandes 62', 81'

Tivoli Stadion Tirol, Innsbruck
25 September 2002

Kilmarnock (Scotland)	0–0	(Russia) CSK VVS Samara
	Report

Tivoli Stadion Tirol, Innsbruck

27 September 2002

(Austria) Innsbruck	0–4	CSK VVS Samara (Russia)
	Report	Dyatchkova 7'; Kremleva 31'; Egorova 65'; Dyarbolova 69'

Tivoli Stadion Tirol, Innsbruck
27 September 2002

Kilmarnock (Scotland)	0–2	(Portugal) 1.º de Dezembro
	Report	Couto 11'; Fernandes 52'

Tivoli Stadion Tirol, Innsbruck

29 September 2002

Innsbruck (Austria)	1–4	(Scotland) Kilmarnock
Mircheva 90+5'	Report	McLaughlin 47'; Brown 52', 54', 72'

Tivoli Stadion Tirol, Innsbruck
29 September 2002

CSK VVS Samara (Russia)	3–0	(Portugal) 1.º de Dezembro
Kremleva 2', 33'; Grigorieva 76'	Report

Tivoli Old, Innsbruck
