= 2002–03 UEFA Women's Cup knockout phase =

Tournament details
- Dates: 30 October 2002 – 21 June 2003
- Teams: 8

The 2002–03 UEFA Women's Cup knockout phase began on 30 October 2002 and concluded on 9 and 21 June 2003 with the two legged tie at the Råsunda Stadium in Stockholm, Sweden and Stadion am Brentanobad in Frankfurt, Germany to decide the champions of the 2002–03 UEFA Women's Cup. A total of 8 teams competed in the knockout phase.

== Bracket ==
Quarter-finals
(Sweden) Umeå	2	0	2
(France) Toulouse	0	0	0
(Finland) HJK	0	0	0
(Germany) Frankfurt	2	8	10
(Norway) Trondheims-Ørn	2	0	2
(Denmark) Fortuna Hjørring	2	1	3
(Russia) CSK VVS Samara	0	1	1
(England) Arsenal	2	1	3

Semi-finals
(Sweden) Umeå	1	1	2 (7)
(Germany) Frankfurt	1	1	2 (6)
(Denmark) Fortuna Hjørring	3	5	8
(England) Arsenal	1	1	2

Final
(Sweden) Umeå	4	3	7
(Denmark) Fortuna Hjørring	1	0	1

== Quarter-finals ==
Team 1	Agg.	Team 2	1st leg	2nd leg
Umeå (Sweden)	2–0	(France) Toulouse	2–0	0–0
HJK (Finland)	0–10	(Germany) Frankfurt	0–2	0–8
Trondheims-Ørn (Norway)	2–3	(Denmark) Fortuna Hjørring	2–2	0–1
CSK VVS Samara (Russia)	1–3	(England) Arsenal	0–2	1–1

3 November 2002

Umeå (Sweden)	2–0	(France) Toulouse
Dahlqvist 41'; Ljungberg 49'	Report

Gammliavallen, Umeå
Referee: Carolina Domenech Ceballos (Spain)
29 November 2002

Toulouse (France)	0–0	(Sweden) Umeå
	Report

Stadium Municipal, Toulouse
Referee: Floarea Cristina Ionescu (Romania)

Umeå won 2–0 on aggregate.

2 November 2002

HJK (Finland)	0–2	(Germany) Frankfurt
	Report	Kliehm 31'; Jones 64'

Pohjola Stadion, Helsinki
Referee: Claudine Brohet (Belgium)
1 December 2002

Frankfurt (Germany)	8–0	(Finland) HJK
Woock 13', 32'; Prinz 15', 17', 25'; Lingor 30' (pen.); Pia Wunderlich 50' (pen.); Affeld 67'	Report

Stadion am Brentanobad, Frankfurt
Referee: Alexandra Ihringova (Slovakia)

Frankfurt won 10–0 on aggregate.

30 October 2002

Trondheims-Ørn (Norway)	2–2	(Denmark) Fortuna Hjørring
Pedersen 68'; Rønning 86'	Report	Bonde 42'; Gajhede 67'

Lerkendal Stadion, Trondheim
Referee: Ari Hänninen (Finland)
30 November 2002

Fortuna Hjørring (Denmark)	1–0	(Norway) Trondheims-Ørn
Forman 70'	Report

Hjørring Stadium, Hjørring
Referee: Anna De Toni (Italy)

Fortuna Hjørring won 3–2 on aggregate.

2 November 2002

CSK VVS Samara (Russia)	0–2	(England) Arsenal
	Report	Petko 5' (o.g.); MacDonald 14'

Metallurg Stadium, Samara
Attendance: 3,000
Referee: Geja Mulder (Netherlands)
28 November 2002

Arsenal (England)	1–1	(Russia) CSK VVS Samara
Maggs 17'	Report	Kremleva 26'

Clarence Park, St Albans
Attendance: 450
Referee: Lale Orta (Turkey)

Arsenal won 3–1 on aggregate.

== Semi-finals ==
Team 1	Agg.	Team 2	1st leg	2nd leg
Umeå (Sweden)	2–2 (7–6 p)	(Germany) Frankfurt	1–1	1–1 (a.e.t.)
Fortuna Hjørring (Denmark)	8–2	(England) Arsenal	3–1	5–1

6 April 2003

Umeå (Sweden)	1–1	(Germany) Frankfurt
Nordbrandt 64'	Report	Pia Wunderlich 5'

Sandåkerns IP, Umeå
Attendance: 3,389
Referee: Bente Skogvang (Norway)
27 April 2003

Frankfurt (Germany)	1–1 (a.e.t.)	(Sweden) Umeå
Lingor 90'	Report	Lindqvist 30'
Penalties
Lingor (penalty scored); Pia Wunderlich (penalty scored); Weichelt (penalty scored); Woock (penalty missed); Wissink (penalty scored); Künzer (penalty scored); Tina Wunderlich (penalty scored); Hansen (penalty missed); Barucha (penalty missed)	6–7	(penalty scored) Moström; (penalty scored) Dahlqvist; (penalty missed) Ljungberg; (penalty scored) Eriksson; (penalty scored) Lundgren; (penalty scored) Runesson; (penalty scored) Östberg; (penalty missed) Valkonen; (penalty scored) Marklund

Stadion am Brentanobad, Frankfurt
Attendance: 4,200
Referee: Nicole Petignat (Switzerland)

2–2 on aggregate. Umeå won 7–6 on penalties.

5 April 2003

Fortuna Hjørring (Denmark)	3–1	(England) Arsenal
Black 42'; Forman 49'; Bonde 66'	Report	Banks 68'

Hjørring Stadium, Hjørring
Attendance: 2,384
Referee: Christine Frai (Germany)
27 April 2003

Arsenal (England)	1–5	(Denmark) Fortuna Hjørring
Banks 68'	Report	B. Christensen 6'; Bonde 47' (pen.), 61'; Black 63'; M. K. Christensen 90'

Underhill, Barnet
Attendance: 500
Referee: Maria Persson (Sweden)

Fortuna Hjørring won 8–2 on aggregate.

== Final ==
Team 1	Agg.	Team 2	1st leg	2nd leg
Umeå (Sweden)	7–1	(Denmark) Fortuna Hjørring	4–1	3–0

9 June 2003
16:00 (CET)

Umeå (Sweden)	4–1	(Denmark) Fortuna Hjørring
Ljungberg 40', 49'; Östberg 53'; Kalmari 63'	Report	Madsen 21'

Gammliavallen, Umeå
Attendance: 7,648
Referee: Elke Günthner (Germany)
21 June 2003
16:00 (CET)

Fortuna Hjørring (Denmark)	0–3	(Sweden) Umeå
	Report	Moström 4' (pen.); Kalmari 35'; Ljungberg 71'

Hjørring Stadium, Hjørring
Attendance: 2,119
Referee: Wendy Toms (England)

Umeå won 7–1 on aggregate.

UEFA Women's Cup
2002–03 winners

First title
