= 1992 Russian Women's Cup =

Tournament details
- Country: Russia

The 1992 Russian Women's Cup was the inaugural edition of the premier knockout tournament in Russia for women's football teams following the dissolution of the Soviet Union. It was contested by 38 teams from eleven federal subjects, and won by Interros Moscow, which also won the national championship.

== Teams by federal subject ==
Federal Subject	Teams
(Moscow Oblast) Moscow	Interros Moscow, Spartak Moscow, Tekstilshchik Ramenskoye, Rus Moscow, Nadezhda Voskresensk, SKIF Malakhovka, Snezhana Lyubertsy, SiM Moscow, CSKA Moscow, Komandor Fryazino, Atoris Moscow, Oka Kashira, MINI Moscow, Energiya Khotkovo, Lokomotiv Moscow, University Moscow, Trasko Moscow, Rus-2 Moscow
(Leningrad Oblast) Leningrad	Prometey Saint Petersburg, Interlenprom Saint Petersburg, Smena Saint Petersburg, Volna Saint Petersburg, Zvezda Saint Petersburg
(Krasnodar Krai) Krasnodar	Sedin-Shiss Krasnodar, Zhemchuzhina Sochi
(Krasnoyarsk Krai) Krasnoyarsk	Sibiryachka Krasnoyarsk (defending Soviet Cup champion)
Chuvashia	Volzhanka Cheboksary
(Stavropol Krai) Stavropol	Viktoria Stavropol
(Republic of Karelia) Karelia	Shturm Pitkyaranta
(Kaluga Oblast) Kaluga	WFC Kaluzhanka
(Voronezh Oblast) Voronezh	Energiya Voronezh
Tatarstan	Syuyumbike Zelenodolsk
(Chelyabinsk Oblast) Chelyabinsk	Taganay Zlatoust
(Nizhny Novgorod Oblast) Nizhny Novgorod	Volna Nizhny Novgorod
(Samara Oblast) Samara	CSK VVS Samara
Mordovia	Krylya Sovetov Saransk
(Vladimir Oblast) Vladimir	Ritm Vyazniki
(Kemerovo Oblast) Kemerovo	Tekstilshchik Kemerovo

== Qualifying round ==
Zone 1:

Team	Pld	W	D	L	GF	GA	Pts
Smena Saint Petersburg	2	2	0	0	4	1	4
Zvezda Saint Petersburg	2	1	0	1	7	5	2
Ritm Vyazniki	2	0	0	2	2	7	0

Zone 2:

Team	Pld	W	D	L	GF	GA	Pts
Lokomotiv Moscow	2	2	0	0	8	2	4
Trasko Moscow	2	1	0	1	7	4	2
Rus-2 Moscow	2	0	0	2	0	9	0

Zone 3:

Team	Pld	W	D	L	GF	GA	Pts
University Moscow	2	2	0	0	11	1	4
Tekstilshchik Kemerovo	2	1	0	1	5	3	2
Zhemchuzhina Sochi	2	0	0	2	0	12	0

Zone 4 was decided in a sole play-off match. CSK VVS Samara beat Lada Togliatti 4–2 in penalties after a goalless draw.

== Round of 32 ==
Team 1	Score	Team 2
Komandor Fryazino	1–4	Tekstilshchik Ramenskoye
Nadezhda Voskresensk	2–1	Smena Saint Petersburg
Sedin-Shiss Krasnodar	1–1 (4-2 p)	Kaluzhanka
Viktoria Stavropol	Walkover	Energiya Voronezh
Atoris Moscow	0–2	Interlenprom Saint Petersburg
Oka Kashira	0–1	Interros Moscow
Volna Saint Petersburg	0–3	Shturm Pitkyaranta
MINI Moscow	0–3	Prometey Saint Petersburg
Syuyumbike Zelenodolsk	0–2	Volzhanka Cheboksary
SKIF Malakhovka	Walkover	Taganay Zlatoust
Energiya Khotkovo	0–5	Spartak Moscow
Snezhana Lyubertsy	0–0 (2-1 p)	Lokomotiv Moscow
Volna Nizhny Novgorod	0–1	SiM Moscow
CSK VVS Samara	0–0 (5-6 p)	Sibiryachka Krasnoyarsk
Krylya Sovetov Saransk	0–3	CSKA Moscow
Rus Moscow	17–0	University Moscow

== Round of 16 ==
Team 1	Score	Team 2
Tekstilshchik Ramenskoye	2–1	Nadezhda Voskresensk
Sedin-Shiss Krasnodar	0–0 (4-3 p)	Viktoria Stavropol
Interlenprom Saint Petersburg	1–3	Interros Moscow
Shturm Pitkyaranta	1–3	Prometey Saint Petersburg
Volzhanka Cheboksary	3–0	SKIF Malakhovka
Spartak Moscow	3–1	Snezhana Lyubertsy
SiM Moscow	0–1	Sibiryachka Krasnoyarsk
CSKA Moscow	0–1	Rus Moscow

== Quarter-finals ==
Team 1	Score	Team 2
Tekstilshchik Ramenskoye	5–1	Sedin-Shiss Krasnodar
Interros Moscow	2–0	Prometey Saint Petersburg
Volzhanka Cheboksary	1–1 (1-3 p)	Spartak Moscow
Sibiryachka Krasnoyarsk	1–0	Rus Moscow

== Semifinals ==
Team 1	Score	Team 2
Tekstilshchik Ramenskoye	0–1	Interros Moscow
Spartak Moscow	0–0 (4-2 p)	Sibiryachka Krasnoyarsk

== Final ==
October 31, 1992

Interros Moscow	4 − 3	Spartak Moscow
Bryleva 39'; Khutsishvili 73'; Grigorieva 90+3', 90+5'		Shilova 13'; Barkova 17', 83'
