= 2002 FA Women's Community Shield =

Annual football match

2002 Women's FA Community Shield
Arsenal	Fulham
2	2
- Fulham won 3–1 on penalties
- Date: 8 August 2002
- Venue: Brisbane Road, Leyton

The 2002 Women's FA Community Shield was the third Women's FA Community Shield, as with its male equivalent, the Community Shield is an annual football match played between the winners of the previous season's league and the previous season's Women's FA Cup. The match was contested between Fulham and Arsenal, on 8 August 2002 at Brisbane Road, the home ground of Leyton Orient. Fulham won 3–1 on penalties after a 2–2 draw inside regular time.

== Match ==
=== Details ===
8 August 2002

Arsenal	2–2 (a.e.t.)	Fulham
Maggs 8', 73'	Report	Duncan 1'; Chapman 11'
Penalties
Ludlow (penalty missed); Wheatley (penalty missed); Champ (penalty scored); White (penalty missed)	1–3	(penalty scored) Pedersen; (penalty missed) Haugenes; (penalty scored) McArthur; (penalty scored) Phillip

Brisbane Road, Leyton

Arsenal	Fulham

GK	1	(Republic of Ireland) Emma Byrne
DF	2	(England) Kirsty Pealling
DF	3	(Scotland) Pauline MacDonald
DF	5	(England) Leanne Champ
DF	6	(England) Faye White
MF	4	(Wales) Jayne Ludlow
MF	7	(England) Sian Williams
MF	10	(Republic of Ireland) Ciara Grant
FW	9	(England) Ellen Maggs
FW	11	(England) Clare Wheatley
FW	17	(Wales) Ayshea Martyn	(substituted off) 61'
Substitutes:
GK	13	(Wales) Jo Price
DF	12	(England) Julie Fletcher	(substituted on) 61'
DF	15	(Republic of Ireland) Yvonne Tracy
DF		(Saint Lucia) Eartha Pond
FW		(England) Sheuneen Ta
Manager:
(England) Vic Akers

GK	1	(Norway) Astrid Johannessen
DF	2	(England) Kim Jerray-Silver	(substituted off) 61'
DF	3	(England) Rachel McArthur
DF	4	(England) Rachel Unitt	(substituted off) 77'
DF	5	(England) Mary Phillip
MF	6	(England) Katie Chapman
MF	7	(Norway) Margunn Haugenes
MF	8	(England) Sanchia Duncan
FW	11	(England) Rachel Yankey
FW	14	(Denmark) Katrine Pedersen
FW	15	(England) Una Nwajei
Substitutes:
GK	13	(England) Jody Smith
DF	14	(Republic of Ireland) Ronnie Gibbons
MF	16	(Bahrain) Deena Rahman	(substituted on) 77'
FW	9	(England) Kristy Moore	(substituted on) 61'
Manager:
(Norway) Gaute Haugenes
