= 2002 in Norwegian football =

Football in Norway
- Season: 2003

Men's football
- Tippeligaen: Rosenborg
- 1. divisjon: Tromsø
- 2. divisjon: Fredrikstad (Group 1); Bærum (Group 2); Mandalskameratene (Group 3); Alta (Group 4)
- Cupen: Vålerenga

Women's football
- Toppserien: Kolbotn
- 1. divisjon: Liungen
- Cupen: Trondheims-Ørn

Results from Norwegian football in 2002.

== Men's football ==
=== League season ===
==== Tippeligaen ====
Pos	Team	Pld	W	D	L	GF	GA	GD	Pts	Qualification or relegation
1	Rosenborg (C)	26	17	5	4	57	30	+27	56	Qualification for the Champions League second qualifying round
2	Molde	26	15	5	6	48	26	+22	50	Qualification for the UEFA Cup qualifying round
3	Lyn	26	14	5	7	36	29	+7	47	Qualification for the UEFA Cup qualifying round
4	Viking	26	11	11	4	44	31	+13	44	
5	Stabæk	26	12	6	8	48	34	+14	42	
6	Odd Grenland	26	12	5	9	36	30	+6	41	
7	Lillestrøm	26	10	6	10	37	30	+7	36	
8	Vålerenga	26	7	12	7	38	31	+7	33	Qualification for the UEFA Cup first round (Note: Vålerenga qualified for the UEFA Cup first round as Norwegian Cup winners.)
9	Bryne	26	8	7	11	38	39	−1	31	
10	Bodø/Glimt	26	9	4	13	38	41	−3	31	
11	Sogndal	26	8	6	12	37	51	−14	30	
12	Brann (O)	26	8	3	15	35	52	−17	27	Qualification for the relegation play-offs
13	Moss (R)	26	6	6	14	32	49	−17	24	Relegation to First Division
14	Start (R)	26	2	5	19	21	72	−51	11	Relegation to First Division

Source: fotball.no
Rules for classification: 1) points; 2) goal difference; 3) number of goals scored.
(C) Champions; (O) Play-off winners; (R) Relegated

===== Play-offs =====
November 2: Sandefjord – Brann 0–0

November 6: Brann – Sandefjord 2–1 (agg. 2–1)

Brann stay up.

==== 1. divisjon ====
Pos	Team	Pld	W	D	L	GF	GA	GD	Pts	Promotion or relegation
1	Tromsø (C, P)	30	21	4	5	78	36	+42	67	Promotion to Tippeligaen
2	Aalesund (P)	30	19	7	4	77	26	+51	64	Promotion to Tippeligaen
3	Sandefjord	30	18	6	6	65	38	+27	60	Qualification for the promotion play-offs
4	Hønefoss	30	18	4	8	64	36	+28	58	
5	Strømsgodset	30	17	4	9	72	51	+21	55	
6	Raufoss	30	17	3	10	71	50	+21	54	
7	Hødd	30	16	4	10	50	41	+9	52	
8	HamKam	30	11	8	11	60	47	+13	41	
9	Haugesund	30	11	7	12	46	59	−13	40	
10	Oslo Øst	30	11	5	14	59	71	−12	38	
11	Ørn-Horten	30	7	8	15	38	69	−31	29	
12	Skeid	30	7	7	16	31	48	−17	28	
13	Åsane (R)	30	8	4	18	41	59	−18	28	Relegation to Second Division
14	Tromsdalen (R)	30	8	3	19	40	65	−25	27	Relegation to Second Division
15	Lørenskog (R)	30	5	5	20	31	72	−41	20	Relegation to Second Division
16	Tollnes (R)	30	6	1	23	37	92	−55	19	Relegation to Second Division

Source: nifs.no
Rules for classification: 1) points; 2) goal difference; 3) number of goals scored.
(C) Champions; (P) Promoted; (R) Relegated

==== 2. divisjon ====
===== Group 1 =====
Pos	Team	Pld	W	D	L	GF	GA	GD	Pts	Promotion or relegation
1	Fredrikstad (P)	26	20	3	3	99	28	+71	63	Promotion to First Division
2	Kvik Halden	26	15	7	4	65	38	+27	52	
3	Follo	26	13	5	8	51	42	+9	44	
4	Nybergsund	26	12	4	10	41	47	−6	40	
5	Ullensaker/Kisa	26	12	3	11	47	45	+2	39	
6	Romerike Fotball	26	10	7	9	54	45	+9	37	
7	Kongsvinger	26	11	4	11	36	31	+5	37	
8	Stabæk 2	26	11	4	11	50	49	+1	37	
9	FF Lillehammer	26	10	5	11	52	57	−5	35	
10	Sprint-Jeløy	26	10	4	12	54	61	−7	34	
11	Eidsvold Turn	26	9	6	11	45	48	−3	33	
12	Elverum (R)	26	8	5	13	43	48	−5	29	Relegation to Third Division
13	Lyn 2 (R)	26	6	6	14	36	64	−28	24	Relegation to Third Division
14	Grindvoll (R)	26	3	1	22	27	97	−70	10	Relegation to Third Division

Source: RSSSF
(P) Promoted; (R) Relegated

===== Group 2 =====
Pos	Team	Pld	W	D	L	GF	GA	GD	Pts	Promotion or relegation
1	Bærum (P)	26	17	6	3	78	37	+41	57	Promotion to First Division
2	FK Tønsberg	26	16	6	4	76	28	+48	54	
3	Pors Grenland	26	13	9	4	63	33	+30	48	
4	Molde 2	26	13	6	7	56	40	+16	45	
5	Strindheim	26	11	11	4	62	36	+26	44	
6	Kjelsås	26	13	5	8	46	30	+16	44	
7	Skarbøvik	26	11	7	8	41	39	+2	40	
8	Larvik Fotball	26	9	7	10	41	40	+1	34	
9	Frigg	26	9	7	10	33	42	−9	34	
10	Langevåg	26	5	9	12	27	45	−18	24	
11	Clausenengen	26	5	7	14	27	62	−35	22	
12	Verdal (R)	26	6	3	17	35	67	−32	21	Relegation to Third Division
13	Træff (R)	26	5	3	18	28	72	−44	18	Relegation to Third Division
14	Spjelkavik (R)	26	4	4	18	28	70	−42	16	Relegation to Third Division

Source: RSSSF
(P) Promoted; (R) Relegated

===== Group 3 =====
Pos	Team	Pld	W	D	L	GF	GA	GD	Pts	Promotion or relegation
1	Mandalskameratene (P)	26	18	7	1	69	19	+50	61	Promotion to First Division
2	Løv-Ham	26	18	5	3	62	28	+34	59	
3	Fyllingen	26	14	4	8	65	63	+2	46	
4	Vard Haugesund	26	12	7	7	66	40	+26	43	
5	Fana	26	12	4	10	48	46	+2	40	
6	Nest-Sotra	25	12	2	11	48	63	−15	38	
7	Brann 2	26	10	5	11	48	53	−5	35	
8	Viking 2	26	9	5	12	59	53	+6	32	
9	Vidar	26	9	4	13	44	54	−10	31	
10	Klepp	26	9	3	14	65	68	−3	30	
11	Jerv	26	9	3	14	47	59	−12	30	
12	Tornado (R)	26	9	3	14	46	68	−22	30	Relegation to Third Division
13	Nord (R)	26	8	3	15	37	63	−26	27	Relegation to Third Division
14	Førde (R)	26	3	5	18	39	66	−27	14	Relegation to Third Division

Source: RSSSF
(P) Promoted; (R) Relegated

===== Group 4 =====
Pos	Team	Pld	W	D	L	GF	GA	GD	Pts	Promotion or relegation
1	Alta (P)	26	18	2	6	79	38	+41	56	Promotion to First Division
2	Byåsen	26	17	5	4	79	44	+35	56	
3	Rosenborg 2	26	15	6	5	83	40	+43	51	
4	Levanger	26	12	5	9	69	45	+24	41	
5	Lofoten	26	11	8	7	53	41	+12	41	
6	Mo	26	11	3	12	47	49	−2	36	
7	Steinkjer	26	10	2	14	53	60	−7	32	
8	Skjervøy	26	9	4	13	44	69	−25	31	
9	Skarp	26	8	6	12	62	68	−6	30	
10	Hammerfest	26	7	9	10	52	58	−6	30	
11	Vesterålen	26	9	3	14	45	65	−20	30	
12	Harstad (R)	26	9	2	15	45	64	−19	29	Relegation to Third Division
13	Salangen (R)	26	9	2	15	40	79	−39	29	Relegation to Third Division
14	Stålkameratene (R)	26	7	3	16	39	70	−31	24	Relegation to Third Division

Source: RSSSF
(P) Promoted; (R) Relegated

=== Norwegian Cup ===
==== Final ====
3 November 2002
13:15 CET (UTC+1)

Odd Grenland	0–1	Vålerenga
	Report	Levernes 5'

Ullevaal Stadion, Oslo
Attendance: 25,481
Referee: Tommy Skjerven (Kaupanger)

== Women's football ==
=== League season ===
==== Toppserien ====
Pos	Team	Pld	W	D	L	GF	GA	GD	Pts	Qualification or relegation
1	Kolbotn (C)	18	15	2	1	60	9	+51	47	Qualification for the UEFA Women's Cup second qualifying round
2	Asker	18	14	2	2	81	23	+58	44	
3	Trondheims-Ørn	18	12	3	3	63	21	+42	39	
4	Røa	18	9	4	5	47	32	+15	31	
5	Arna-Bjørnar	18	8	2	8	44	38	+6	26	
6	Team Strømmen	18	6	2	10	29	59	−30	20	
7	Klepp	18	5	2	11	26	45	−19	17	
8	Larvik	18	4	5	9	26	55	−29	17	
9	Sandviken (R)	18	3	4	11	20	48	−28	13	Relegation to First Division
10	Byåsen (R)	18	0	2	16	13	79	−66	2	Relegation to First Division

Source: NIFS
Rules for classification: 1) points; 2) goal difference; 3) number of goals scored.
(C) Champions; (R) Relegated

==== 1. divisjon ====
1. Liungen 16 14 1 1 71–14 43 Promoted
2. Fløya 16 9 2 5 27–17 29 Promoted
-------------------------------------
3. Skeid 16 8 5 3 31–22 29
4. Haugar 16 8 0 8 31–31 24
5. Medkila 16 6 3 7 34–24 21
6. Fortuna 16 6 2 8 21–28 20
7. Nittedal 16 6 2 8 22–38 20 (ex Gjelleråsen)
8. Vålerenga 16 5 3 8 22–32 18
-------------------------------------
9. Follese 16 1 0 15 11–64 3 Relegated
Athene Moss withdrew before the season because of financial problems.

=== Norwegian Women's Cup ===
==== Final ====
- Trondheims-Ørn 4–3 (a.e.t.) Arna-Bjørnar

== Men's UEFA competitions ==
Norwegian representatives:

- Rosenborg (UEFA Champions League)
- Lillestrøm (UEFA Champions League)
- Viking (UEFA Cup, cup winner)
- Stabæk (UEFA Cup)
- Brann (UEFA Cup, fair play)

=== Champions League ===
==== Qualifying rounds ====
===== Second qualifying round =====
Team 1	Agg.	Team 2	1st leg	2nd leg
Lillestrøm SK (Norway)	0–2	(Bosnia and Herzegovina) Željezničar	0–1	0–1

===== Third qualifying round =====
Team 1	Agg.	Team 2	1st leg	2nd leg
Rosenborg (Norway)	4–2	(Denmark) Brøndby	1–0	3–2

==== Champions League, Phase 1 ====
===== Group D =====
Pos	Team	Pld	W	D	L	GF	GA	GD	Pts	Qualification	INT	AJX	LYO	ROS
1	(Italy) Internazionale	6	3	2	1	12	8	+4	11	Advance to second group stage	—	1–0	1–2	3–0
2	(Netherlands) Ajax	6	2	2	2	6	5	+1	8	Advance to second group stage	1–2	—	2–1	1–1
3	(France) Lyon	6	2	2	2	12	9	+3	8	Transfer to UEFA Cup	3–3	0–2	—	5–0
4	(Norway) Rosenborg	6	0	4	2	4	12	−8	4		2–2	0–0	1–1	—

Source: RSSSF

Matches

- September 17: Rosenborg – Inter (Italy) 2–2
- September 25: Lyon (France) – Rosenborg 5–0
- October 2: Rosenborg – Ajax (Netherlands) 0–0
- October 22: Ajax – Rosenborg 1–1
- October 30: Inter – Rosenborg 3–0
- November 12: Rosenborg – Lyon 1–1

=== UEFA Cup ===
==== Preliminary round ====
August 15: Brann – Suduva Marijampole (Lithuania) 2–3

Stabæk – Linfield (Northern Ireland) 4–0

August 29: Linfield – Stabæk 1–1 (agg. 1–5)

Suduva Marijampole – Brann 3–2 (agg. 6–4)

==== First round ====
September 19: Anderlecht (Belgium) – Stabæk 0–1

Chelsea (England) – Viking 2–1

October 3: Stabæk – Anderlecht 1–2 (agg. 2–2, Anderlecht on away goals)

Viking – Chelsea 4–2 (agg. 5–4)

==== Second round ====
October 31: Celta (Spain) – Viking 3–0

November 14: Viking – Celta 1–1 (agg. 1–4)

=== Intertoto Cup ===
No Norwegian representative this season.

== UEFA Women's Cup ==
=== Second qualifying round ===
==== Group 5 ====
Pos	Team	Pld	W	D	L	GF	GA	GD	Pts	Qualification	ØRN	SAE	REG	PAOK
1	(Norway) Trondheims-Ørn	3	3	0	0	18	0	+18	9	Advance to quarter-finals	—	2–0	–	12–0
2	(Netherlands) Saestum	3	2	0	1	10	3	+7	6		–	—	2–0	8–1
3	(Romania) Regal Bucharest	3	1	0	2	3	6	−3	3		0–4	–	—	–
4	(Greece) PAOK (H)	3	0	0	3	1	23	−22	0		–	–	0–3	—

Source: RSSSF
(H) Hosts

Matches (in Saloniki)

September 25: Trondheims/Ørn – Saestum (Netherlands) 2–0
September 27: Trondheims/Ørn – PAOK Saloniki (Greece) 12–0
September 29: Regal București (Romania) – Trondheims/Ørn 0–4

=== Quarter-finals ===
Team 1	Agg.	Team 2	1st leg	2nd leg
Trondheims-Ørn (Norway)	2–3	(Denmark) Fortuna Hjørring	2–2	0–1

== National teams ==
=== Norway men's national football team ===
Date	Venue	Opponent	Res.*	Comp.	Norwegian goalscorers
February 13	Brussels	Belgium	1–0	F
March 27	Tunis	Tunisia	0–0	F
April 17	Oslo	Sweden	0–0	F
May 14	Oslo	Japan	3–0	F	Henning Berg, Sigurd Rushfeldt, Ole Gunnar Solskjær
May 22	Bodø	Iceland	1–1	F	Ole Gunnar Solskjær
August 21	Oslo	Netherlands	0–1	F
September 7	Oslo	Denmark	2–2	ECQ	John Arne Riise, John Carew
October 12	Bucharest	Romania	1–0	ECQ	Steffen Iversen
October 16	Oslo	Bosnia and Herzegovina	2–0	ECQ	Claus Lundekvam, John Arne Riise
November 20	Wien	Austria	1–0	F	Pa-Madou Kah

Note: Norway's goals first
Explanation:

- F = Friendly
- ECQ = Euro 2004 Qualifier

=== Norway women's national football team ===
January 23: Norway – United States 1–0, friendly

January 25: China – Norway 0–3, friendly

January 27: Norway – Germany 1–3, friendly

March 1: Norway – England 3–1, friendly

March 3: Norway – Sweden 3–3, friendly

March 5: Norway – United States 3–2, friendly

March 7: Norway – China 0–1, friendly

March 24: Czech Republic – Norway 1–5, World Cup qualifier

May 9: Norway – France 3–1, World Cup qualifier

May 12: Ukraine – Norway 1–1, World Cup qualifier

July 17: Canada – Norway 2–2, friendly

July 21: United States – Norway 4–0, friendly

September 14: Norway – Germany 1–3, friendly
