= List of ZFK CSKA Moscow seasons =

This is a list of seasons played by ZFK CSKA Moscow, the women's football section of Russian sports club CSKA Moscow.

== Summary ==
Champions	Runners-up	Promoted	Relegated

Domestic and international results of ZFK CSKA Moscow
Season	League										Cup	Europe	League top scorers					
Season	Tier	Division	Pos	P	W	D	L	F	A	Pts	Cup	Europe	1st	Goal	2nd	Goal	3rd	Goal
1991	2	Soviet First League	1^{st}	24	10	1	3	33	8	21								
1992	1	Russian Supreme League	11^{th}	28	5	10	13	10	37	20	R16							
1993	1	Russian Supreme League	9^{th}	22	3	7	12	9	25	13	R16							
CSKA remained inactive between 1994 and 2013
2014	2	Russian First League	7^{th}	14	3	1	10	7	30	10	PR2							
CSKA remained inactive in 2015
2016	1	Russian Supreme League	5^{th}	15	4	3	8	17	25	15	QF		(Russia) Chernova ^{N}	3	(Russia) Blynskaya	3	(Russia) Pankratova ^{N}	2
2017	1	Russian Supreme League	4^{th}	14	9	1	4	25	14	28	W		(Cameroon) Onguene	9	(Russia) Smirnova	3	(Russia) Mashina ^{N}	2
