= Lemeshko =

Lemeshko (Ukrainian: Лемешко) is a Ukrainian surname. Notable people with the surname include:

- Liubomyr Lemeshko (born 1992), Ukrainian swimmer
- Lyudmyla Lemeshko (born 1979), Ukrainian footballer
- Sergei Lemeshko (1972–2016), Russian footballer
- Yevhen Lemeshko (1930–2016), Ukrainian footballer
