= Irina Grigorieva (footballer) =

Russian footballer (born 1970)

Personal information
- Full name: Irina Olegovna Grigorieva
- Date of birth: 21 February 1970 (age 56)
- Place of birth: Moscow, Russian SFSR, Soviet Union
- Height: 5 ft 4 in (1.63 m)
- Position: Midfielder

Senior career*
Years	Team	Apps	(Gls)
1985–1991	Stankoagregat Moscow		
1992	Interros Moscow		
1993	FC Lyon		
1994	→ 1. FFC Turbine Potsdam (loan)		
1994–2004	CSK VVS Samara	181	(77)
2005–2006	Spartak Moscow		
2007	Nadezhda Noginsk		

International career
1990–1991	Soviet Union		
1992	CIS		
1992–2002	Russia	43	(9)
- * Club domestic league appearances and goals

Irina Olegovna Grigorieva (Russian: Ирина Олеговна Григорьева) is a Russian former footballer who played as a midfielder. She played for FC Lyon, Spartak Moscow, CSK VVS Samara and Nadezhda Noginsk.

Internationally, Grigorieva represented three different teams. She first played for the Soviet Union in 1990, before the dissolution of the Soviet Union in 1991. During 1992, she played for the CIS, a brief association of former Soviet republics. Subsequently, she represented Russia.

She captained Russia at the 1999 FIFA Women's World Cup, where she scored in the third match against Canada, as well as at the 1997 and 2001 editions of the UEFA Women's Championship.

The Russian Football Union has described her as: "the best football player in the history of Russia".

== Early life ==
Grigorieva grew up in Yasenevo District with her cook mother and mechanic father. She was a childhood figure skater, who later progressed to playing field hockey and bandy.

== Club career ==
After Grigorieva's works hockey team "Stankoagregat" were defeated by their rivals in a national Cup final, the team coach suggested forming a football team instead. The club underwent name changes due to sponsorship and quickly became competitive in the Soviet women's football championship. Grigorieva was sent off and banned when her retaliation to being fouled brought about a mass brawl in a game against Nyva Baryshivka.

In the inaugural 1992 edition of the Russian Women's Football Championship, Grigorieva scored 22 goals for champions Spartak-Interros. She added two decisive goals in the 1992 Russian Women's Cup final as her club secured a League and Cup "double".

Grigorieva transferred to FC Lyon in 1993, where she lodged with team mate Cécile Locatelli. She helped the team secure the 1992–93 Division 1 Féminine title and was named the Best Foreign Player of the Year. However, an anterior cruciate ligament injury brought about her return to Russia, where she accepted an offer to join CSK VVS Samara.

With CSK, Grigorieva and her team mates trained full-time while nominally employed as ensigns in the Russian Ground Forces. She spent half a season with Turbine Potsdam in 1994–95, but otherwise remained with CSK until their dissolution in 2004. In total, she made 181 league appearances and scored 77 goals for CSK VVS Samara.

In summer 2004 Grigorieva joined FC Energy Voronezh and she represented the club in the 2004–05 UEFA Women's Cup.

== International career ==
Grigorieva was called up to the Soviet Union women's national football team within a year of taking up organized football. With the Russia women's national football team she was the captain of the team at UEFA Women's Euro 1997. Although she scored against France, the team underperformed, losing all three matches and failing to progress from the group stage.

At the 1999 FIFA Women's World Cup draw in February of that year, Grigorieva represented her country when she was picked to play in a FIFA World XI against the United States in a showpiece exhibition game in San Jose, California. She appeared as a substitute for Bettina Wiegmann in the World XI's 2–1 win.

She had helped Russia qualify for their first FIFA Women's World Cup by scoring in the qualification playoff win over Finland. A tournament preview on the SoccerTimes.com website described her as a skilful center midfielder who possessed "the keys to the [Russian] attack". She was among several Russian squad members who had been converted to soccer from other sports.

In Russia's 5–0 Group C win over Japan at the final tournament, a notably unselfish display from Grigorieva saw her pass up goal-scoring opportunities for herself while serving three assists to team mates. She opened the scoring herself in the 4–1 win over Canada which secured qualification for the quarter-finals, after which she said: "Sydney is looming, dominating all our thoughts". The team's defensive approach in their 2–0 quarter final defeat by China nullified the attacking threat of "Russia's strongest attacker" Grigorieva.

== Post-playing career ==
After retirement, she worked as a social worker.

== Honours ==
CSK VVS Samara

- Russian Women's Football Championship: 1992, 1994, 1996, 2001
- Russian Women's Cup: 1994

Lyon

- Division 1 Féminine: 1993
