= 1992 Russian Women's Football Championship =

The 1992 Russian Women's Football Championship was the inaugural edition of the premier championship for Russian women's football teams, succeeding the 1991 Soviet Championship. Interros Moscow won the championship with a one-point advantage over CSK VVS Samara. However it was disbanded following the end of the season along with Spartak Moscow, Interlenprom Saint Petersburg, Sturm Petrozavodsk and Sedin-Shiss Krasnodar.

== Teams by federal subject ==
- (Moscow Oblast) Interros Moscow, SKIF Malakhovka, Tekstilschik Ramenskoye, Spartak Moscow, SiM Moscow, CSKA Moscow, Snezhana Lyubertsy
- (Leningrad Oblast) Prometei Saint Petersburg, Interlenprom Saint Petersburg
- (Samara Oblast) CSK VVS Samara
- (Krasnoyarsk Krai) Sibiryachka Krasnoyarsk
- (Chuvashia) Volzhanka Chevoksary
- (Voronezh Oblast) Energiya Voronezh
- (Republic of Karelia) Sturm Petrozavodsk

== Standings ==
	Team	P	W	D	L	G+	G−	Pts	Comments
1	Interros Moscow	28	17	9	2	54	9	43	Champion, disbanded
2	CSK VVS Samara	28	18	6	4	44	16	42	
3	SKIF Malakhovka	28	17	7	4	43	13	41	
4	Tekstilshchik Ramenskoye	28	16	6	6	61	21	38	
5	Sibiryachka Krasnoyarsk	28	17	7	4	43	13	41	
6	Volzhanka Chevoksary	28	14	8	6	33	15	36	
7	Energiya Voronezh	28	15	5	8	29	19	35	
8	Spartak Moscow	28	14	4	10	36	22	32	Disbanded
9	Prometei Saint Petersburg	28	10	6	12	31	33	26	
10	SiM Moscow	28	7	7	14	24	32	21	
11	CSKA Moscow	28	5	10	13	10	37	20	
12	Interlenprom Saint Petersburg	28	6	5	17	9	50	17	Disbanded
13	Sturm Petrozavodsk	28	4	7	17	10	45	15	Disbanded
14	Snezhana Lyubertsy	28	3	4	21	12	73	10	Relegated
15	Sedin-Shiss Krasnodar	28	2	2	24	8	30	6	Disbanded

== Top scorers ==
Rank	Player	Team	Goals
1	(Russia) Larisa Savina	CSK VVS Samara	23
2	(Russia) Irina Grigorieva	Interros Moscow	22
+	(Russia) Elena Kononova	SKIF Malakhovka	22
4	(Russia) Larisa Polikarpova	Tekstilschik Ramenskoye	17
