= Andrei Pobedenny =

Russian footballer and referee

Personal information
- Full name: Andrei Anatolyevich Pobedenny
- Date of birth: 3 October 1966 (age 60)
- Height: 1.83 m (6 ft 0 in)
- Position: Goalkeeper

Youth career
- ROShISP-10 Rostov-on-Don

Senior career*
Years	Team	Apps	(Gls)
1985–1993	FC Dynamo Stavropol	55	(0)
1993	FC Interros Moskovsky	1	(0)
1994	FC Rostselmash Rostov-on-Don	4	(0)
- * Club domestic league appearances and goals

Andrei Anatolyevich Pobedenny (Russian: Андрей Анатольевич Победенный; born 3 October 1966) is a former Russian football player and referee.

He worked as an assistant referee in the Russian Third League in 1996–1997.
