= Marina Kolomiets =

Russian footballer (born 1972)

Personal information
- Full name: Marina Gennadyevna Kolomiets
- Date of birth: 29 September 1972 (age 54)
- Place of birth: Kazakh SSR, Soviet Union
- Height: 1.64 m (5 ft 5 in)
- Position: Defender

Senior career*
Years	Team	Apps	(Gls)
1990–1991	SKA-Merey Alma-Ata		
1992–1995	CSK VVS Samara		
1996–2000	Energiya Voronezh		
2001	Ryazan VDV		
2002–2005	Lada Togliatti		
2006	Nadezhda Noginsk		
2007–2008	Zvezda Perm		

International career
- Russia
- * Club domestic league appearances and goals

Marina Kolomiets is a former Russian football defender. Throughout her career she played for several teams in the Russian Championship, winning seven leagues with CSK VVS Samara, Energiya Voronezh, Lada Togliatti and Zvezda Perm.

She was a member of the Russian national team, and took part in the 2003 World Cup.

== Titles ==
- 7 Russian Championships (1993, 1994, 1997, 1998, 2004, 2007, 2008)
- 9 Russian Cups (1994, 1996, 1997, 1999, 2000, 2002, 2003, 2004, 2007)
