= Janne Stange =

Norwegian footballer (born 1986)

Personal information
- Date of birth: 24 June 1986 (age 40)
- Position: Defender

Team information
- Current team: Røa
- Number: 2

Youth career
- Avaldsnes
- Torvastad
- Asker

Senior career*
Years	Team	Apps	(Gls)
2002–2008	Asker		
2009–2010	Stabæk		
2010–	Røa		

International career^{‡}
2005–2006	Norway u-21	8	(0)
- * Club domestic league appearances and goals ‡ National team caps and goals as of 13 December 2007

Janne Stange (born 24 June 1986) is a Norwegian football defender who grew up on the west-coast island of Karmøy near Haugesund. Later she moved to Oslo, and in the top women's league, the Toppserien, she played for Asker, and then in 2009 for Stabæk Fotball Kvinner, mainly as a left-back. For the 2010 season she transferred to neighbouring club Røa, and on 13 November she became a champion when Røa won the Cup Final, with Stange playing on the left wing. In 2011 Røa continued their success, winning the Toppserien league title.

She attended Norges Toppidrettsgymnas and the Norwegian School of Management.

Early in 2012, after ten seasons in top football, Stange left Røa to return to Karmøy to play for her former club Avaldsnes in division-1.
