= Lilas Traïkia =

French footballer (born 1985)

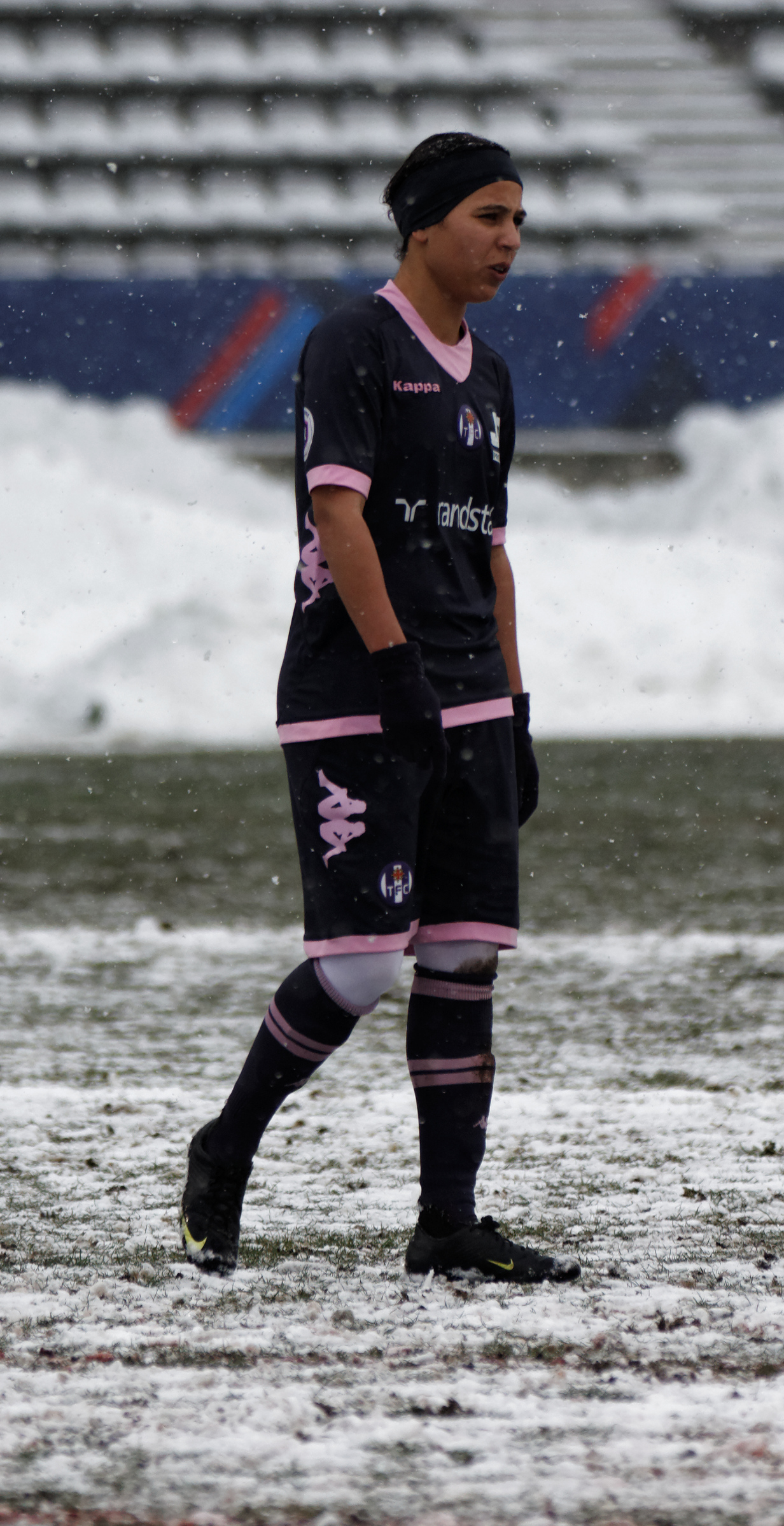
- Traïkia in 2013

Personal information
- Full name: Lilas Traïkia
- Date of birth: 6 August 1985 (age 41)
- Place of birth: Lavaur, France
- Position: Forward

Team information
- Current team: Val d'Orge

Senior career*
Years	Team	Apps	(Gls)
2000–2006	Toulouse	65	(38)
2006–2012	Albi	79	(72)
2012–2013	Toulouse	18	(6)
2013–2016	Juvisy	18	(6)
2016–	Val d'Orge	1	(1)

International career^{‡}
2002	France U-19	5	(0)
2005–2006	France U-21	4	(0)
2006–2008	France	5	(1)
- * Club domestic league appearances and goals as of 16 September 2016 (UTC) ‡ National team caps and goals as of 16 September 2010 (UTC)

Lilas Traïkia (born 6 August 1985) is a French football forward currently playing in the Division 2 Féminine for FCF Val d'Orge. She played the UEFA Women's Cup in 2002 and 2003 with Toulouse FC. She made five appearances for the France national team between 2006 and 2008, scoring one goal against Serbia in the 2009 European Championship qualification.
