= Torvastad IL =

Norwegian sports club

Torvastad
- Full name: Torvastad Idrettslag
- Founded: 6 August 1945
- Ground: Torvastad idrettssenter, Torvastad
- League: 3. divisjon
- 2024: 4. divisjon / Rogaland 2, 1st of 12 (promoted)
Home colours

Torvastad IL is a Norwegian sports club from the district Torvastad in Karmøy Municipality. It has sections for association football, orienteering and athletics, and was founded on 6 August 1945.

The men's football team currently resides in the Fourth Division (fifth tier), having last played in the Third Division in 2007. Before that they had a Third Division run from 2000 to 2004. Notable former players include Egil Østenstad. The women's team has existed since 1974, and young players from Torvastad who have gone on to bigger clubs include Janne Stange and Solfrid Andersen.

The orienteerer Anne Margrethe Hausken also represents the club.

On the 10th of April, 2024, Torvastad defeated Eliteserien club Haugesund in the first round of the Norwegian Cup in a penalty shootout, marking one of the most memorable moments in club history.
