= Valentina Barkova =

Soviet and Russian footballer (born 1971)

Personal information
- Full name: Valentina Vladimirovna Barkova
- Date of birth: 17 March 1971 (age 55)
- Place of birth: Odessa, Soviet Union (now Ukraine)
- Height: 1.70 m (5 ft 7 in)
- Position: Midfielder

Team information
- Current team: ZFK Dynamo Moscow U21 (manager)

Senior career*
Years	Team	Apps	(Gls)
1991	Chernomorochka Odessa		
1992	Spartak Moscow		
1993–1996	Chertanovo Moscow		
- 1. FFC Turbine Potsdam
1997–1998	Ryazan-VDV		
2002	Spartak Moscow		
2003–2006	Nadezhda Noginsk		

International career
1991–1992	Soviet Union/CIS	2+	(1)
1992–2002	Russia	35+	(1)

Managerial career
- 2021–2023: ZFK Dynamo Moscow U15
- 2023–: ZFK Dynamo Moscow U21
- * Club domestic league appearances and goals

Valentina Vladimirovna Barkova (Russian: Валентина Владимировна Баркова; born 17 March 1971) is a Russian football manager and former footballer who played as a midfielder. She is currently the manager of ZFK Dynamo Moscow's under-21 team.

== Club career ==
Barkova played for Chernomorochka Odessa, Spartak Moscow, Chertanovo Moscow, 1. FFC Turbine Potsdam, Ryazan-VDV, and Nadezhda Noginsk. She won the Russian Women's Cup once in 1998, and finished third in the Russian Women's Football Championship five times.

== International career ==
Barkova played for the Soviet Union women's national team, scoring her only goal in a 3–1 win against England in September 1991. She also appeared in a 2–1 win against Hungary in 1993 UEFA Women's Championship qualifying.

Between 1992 and 2002, she made over 35 appearances for the Russia women's national team, scoring her only goal in a 1–0 win against Moldova on 9 March 1993. She later represented Russia at the 1997 UEFA Women's Championship, making two appearances.

== Managerial career ==
Following her retirement, she switched to coaching. She started working at various sports schools in Ryazan, Noginsk, and Moscow, as well as the Moscow women's under-17 junior team which finished second in 2017 and third in 2022 at the Football Championship for constituent entities of the Russian Federation. In 2009, she was recognized as the best coach in the Moscow Oblast. She also worked as a coach for ŽFK Nadezhda between 2008 and 2013, and for ZFK Sokol between 2013 and 2021.

In December 2021, she was appointed the head coach of ZFK Dynamo Moscow's under-15 team. On 9 January 2023, she was appointed the head coach of the club's under-21 team.

== Personal life ==
Barkova has a son. She acquired Russian citizenship on 29 September 2001.
