= Svetlana Petko =

Russian footballer (born 1970)

Personal information
- Full name: Svetlana Petko
- Date of birth: 6 June 1970 (age 56)
- Position: Goalkeeper

Senior career*
Years	Team	Apps	(Gls)
1989–1991	Lehenda Chernihiv		(0)
1992	Interros Moskva		(0)
1993	CSK VVS Samara		

International career
1990–1991	Soviet Union		
1992–2004	Russia	144	
- * Club domestic league appearances and goals

Svetlana Petko (Russian: Светлана Петько; born June 6, 1970) is a former international Russian football goalkeeper. She played for Lehenda Chernihiv, Interros Moskva and CSK VVS Samara throughout her career, winning four Russian leagues.

She is the most capped Russian female player, with 144 appearances for the Soviet and Russian national teams. She was Russia's first-choice goalkeeper in the 1999 and Alla Volkova's reserve in the 2003 World Cup.

She is currently the manager of ShVSM Izmailovo in the Russian league.
