= Mihaela Burtică =

Romanian footballer (born 1976)

Personal information
- Full name: Adriana Mihaela Burtică
- Date of birth: 29 July 1976 (age 50)
- Place of birth: Romania
- Position: Defender

Senior career*
Years	Team	Apps	(Gls)
- Regal Bucharest
- Codru Anenii Noi
- Brazi

International career
1998–	Romania	109	(6)
- * Club domestic league appearances and goals

Adriana Mihaela Burtică (born 29 July 1976) is a Romanian football defender, currently playing for CS Brazi in the Romanian First League. She has played the UEFA Women's Cup with Regal Bucharest and Codru Anenii Noi.

She is a member of the Romanian national team since 1998.
