= Marina Nohalez =

Spanish footballer (born 1974)

Personal information
- Full name: Marina Nohalez Caballero
- Date of birth: 5 July 1974 (age 52)
- Place of birth: Alaquàs, Spain
- Height: 1.71 m (5 ft 7 in)
- Position: Defender

Senior career*
Years	Team	Apps	(Gls)
- Torrent
1999–2009	Levante		

International career
?–2002	Spain	35	(0)
- * Club domestic league appearances and goals

Marina Nohalez Caballero is a former Spanish football defender. She played ten seasons for Levante UD in the Spanish Superleague before retiring in 2009.

She was a member of the Spain women's national football team and took part in the 1997 European Championship.
