= Solfrid Andersen =

Norwegian football striker (born 1982)

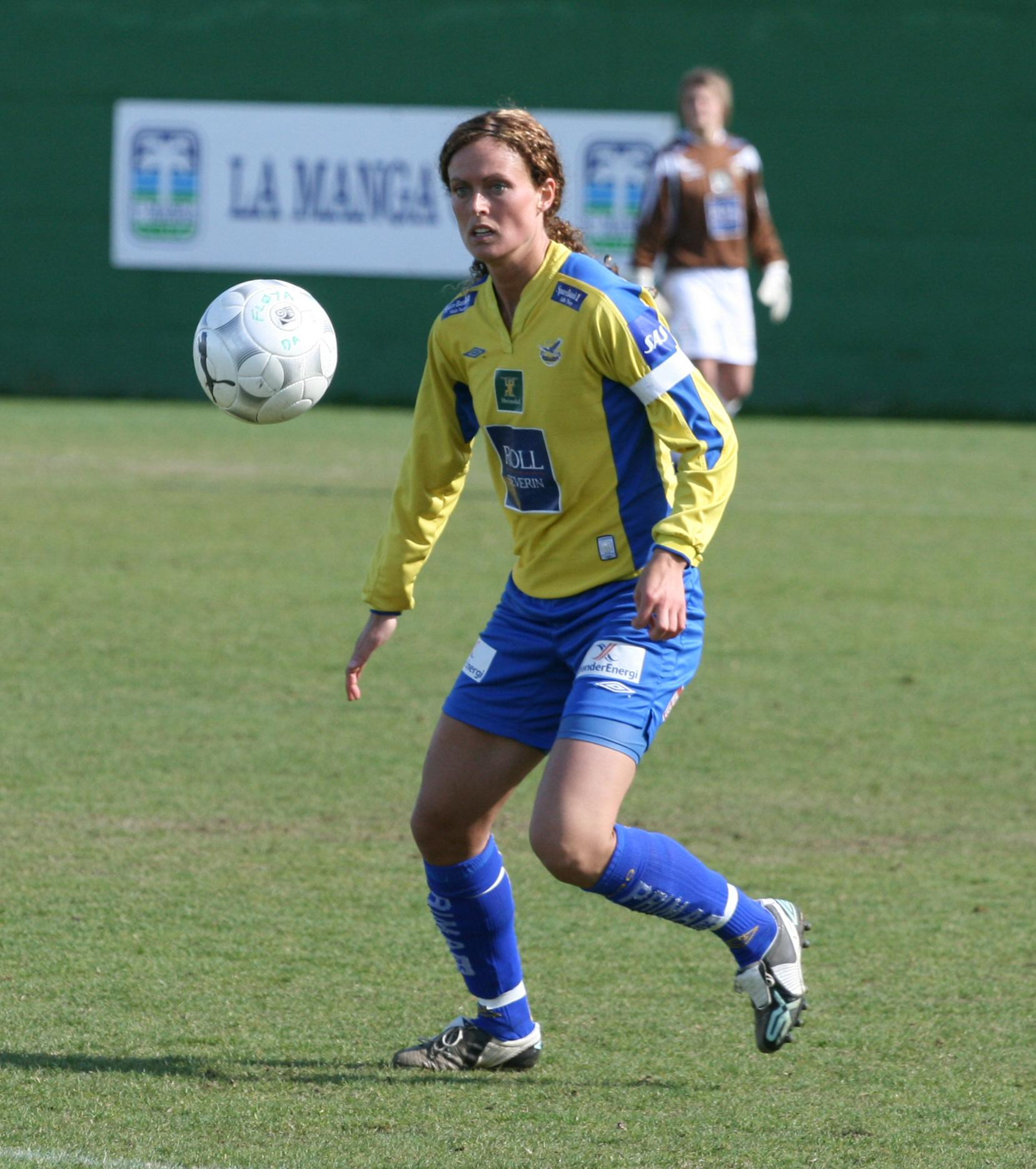

Personal information
- Full name: Solfrid Annette Andersen Dahle
- Date of birth: 13 May 1982 (age 44)
- Place of birth: Kirkenes, Norway
- Positions: Striker; defender

Youth career
- Torvastad
- Haugar
- 2004: VCU Rams

Senior career*
Years	Team	Apps	(Gls)
2000–2001	Haugar		
2001	Byåsen		
2002–2014	Trondheims-Ørn		
2015	Haugar		
2016–2017	Nardo		
2018	Ranheim		

International career^{‡}
1999	Norway u-17	6	(1)
2000–2001	Norway u-18	7	(5)
2002–2006	Norway u-21	22	(6)
2005–2013	Norway	12	(1)
- * Club domestic league appearances and goals ‡ National team caps and goals as of 14 September 2014

Solfrid Annette Andersen Dahle (born 13 May 1982) is a Norwegian football striker who mostly played for Trondheims-Ørn of the Norwegian Toppserien league. Before the 2008 season she became a central defender and took over as the team captain. She was capped for Norway as a striker in 2006 and has later played for the national team as a central defender.
