= 2002–03 UEFA Women's Cup =

Tournament details
- Teams: 35

Final positions
- Champions: (Sweden) Umeå IK (1st title)
- Runners-up: (Denmark) Fortuna Hjørring

Tournament statistics
- Top scorer(s): (Sweden) Hanna Ljungberg; 10 goals

The UEFA Women's Cup 2002–03 was the second edition of the UEFA Women's Cup. It was won by Swedish Damallsvenskan side Umeå in a two-legged final against Fortuna Hjørring of Denmark.

== Teams ==
Second qualifying round
(Germany) Frankfurt (TH, CH)	(Sweden) Umeå (CH)	(England) Arsenal (CH)	(Denmark) Fortuna Hjørring (CH)
(Norway) Trondheims-Ørn (CH)	(Italy) Lazio (CH)	(Serbia and Montenegro) Mašinac Classic Niš (CH)	(Czech Republic) Sparta Prague (CH)
(Spain) Levante (CH)	(Iceland) Breiðablik (CH)	(Russia) CSK VVS Samara (CH)	(France) Toulouse (CH)
(Belarus) Bobruichanka Bobruisk (CH)	(Switzerland) Sursee (CH)	(Netherlands) Saestum (CH)	(Hungary) Femina (CH)
(Poland) AZS Wrocław (CH)	(Portugal) 1° Dezembro (CH)	(Scotland) Kilmarnock (CH)	(Greece) PAOK (CH)
(Romania) Regal Bucharest (CH)	(Finland) HJK (CH)	(Moldova) Codru Anenii Noi (CH)	(Faroe Islands) KÍ Klaksvík (CH)
(Republic of Ireland) Shamrock Rovers (CW)	(Belgium) Eendracht Aalst (CH)	(Austria) Innsbruck (CH)	(Israel) Maccabi Haifa (CH)
(Wales) Bangor City (CW)	(Croatia) Osijek (CH)	(Estonia) Visa Tallinn (CH)	
First qualifying round
(Azerbaijan) Gömrükçü Baku (CH)	(Northern Ireland) Distillery Predators (CH)	(Slovenia) Škale-Mila-Krško (CH)	(Cyprus) Lefkothea (CH)

== Qualifying round ==
=== First qualifying round ===
Pos	Team	Pld	W	D	L	GF	GA	GD	Pts	Qualification	GBA	DPR	ŠMK	LEF
1	(Azerbaijan) Gömrükçü Baku	3	3	0	0	19	0	+19	9	Advance to second qualifying round	—	–	–	–
2	(Northern Ireland) Distillery Predators	3	2	0	1	4	7	−3	6		0–7	—	1–0	–
3	(Slovenia) Škale-Mila-Krško (H)	3	1	0	2	9	5	+4	3		0–4	–	—	–
4	(Cyprus) Lefkothea	3	0	0	3	0	20	−20	0		0–8	0–3	0–9	—

Source: RSSSF
(H) Hosts

=== Second qualifying round ===
==== Group 1 ====
Pos	Team	Pld	W	D	L	GF	GA	GD	Pts	Qualification	UME	SPR	KIK	VTA
1	(Sweden) Umeå (H)	3	3	0	0	17	1	+16	9	Advance to quarter-finals	—	–	–	4–0
2	(Czech Republic) Sparta Prague	3	2	0	1	11	6	+5	6		1–6	—	4–0	0–6
3	(Faroe Islands) KÍ	3	1	0	2	2	11	−9	3		0–7	–	—	2–0
4	(Estonia) Visa Tallinn	3	0	0	3	0	12	−12	0		–	–	–	—

Source: RSSSF
(H) Hosts

==== Group 2 ====
Pos	Team	Pld	W	D	L	GF	GA	GD	Pts	Qualification	TOU	LAZ	FEM	MHA
1	(France) Toulouse	3	2	1	0	11	1	+10	7	Advance to quarter-finals	—	–	1–0	9–0
2	(Italy) Lazio (H)	3	2	1	0	11	3	+8	7		1–1	—	5–2	5–0
3	(Hungary) Femina Budapest	3	1	0	2	6	6	0	3		–	–	—	4–0
4	(Israel) Maccabi Haifa	3	0	0	3	0	18	−18	0		–	–	–	—

Source: RSSSF
(H) Hosts

==== Group 3 ====
Pos	Team	Pld	W	D	L	GF	GA	GD	Pts	Qualification	FRA	MCN	SRO	OSI
1	(Germany) Frankfurt	3	3	0	0	17	1	+16	9	Advance to quarter-finals	—	–	–	8–0
2	(Federal Republic of Yugoslavia) Masinac Niš (H)	3	2	0	1	10	3	+7	6		0–2	—	4–1	6–0
3	(Republic of Ireland) Shamrock Rovers	3	1	0	2	5	12	−7	3		1–7	–	—	–
4	(Croatia) Osijek	3	0	0	3	1	17	−16	0		–	–	1–3	—

Source: RSSSF
(H) Hosts

==== Group 4 ====
Pos	Team	Pld	W	D	L	GF	GA	GD	Pts	Qualification	HJK	SUR	WRO	BAN
1	(Finland) HJK	3	2	1	0	10	0	+10	7	Advance to quarter-finals	—	–	2–0	8–0
2	(Switzerland) Sursee	3	2	1	0	2	0	+2	7		0–0	—	1–0	1–0
3	(Poland) AZS Wrocław (H)	3	1	0	2	6	6	0	3		–	–	—	6–3
4	(Wales) Bangor City	3	0	0	3	3	15	−12	0		–	–	–	—

Source: RSSSF
(H) Hosts

==== Group 5 ====
Pos	Team	Pld	W	D	L	GF	GA	GD	Pts	Qualification	ØRN	SAE	REG	PAOK
1	(Norway) Trondheims-Ørn	3	3	0	0	18	0	+18	9	Advance to quarter-finals	—	2–0	–	12–0
2	(Netherlands) Saestum	3	2	0	1	10	3	+7	6		–	—	2–0	8–1
3	(Romania) Regal Bucharest	3	1	0	2	3	6	−3	3		0–4	–	—	–
4	(Greece) PAOK (H)	3	0	0	3	1	23	−22	0		–	–	0–3	—

Source: RSSSF
(H) Hosts

==== Group 6 ====
Pos	Team	Pld	W	D	L	GF	GA	GD	Pts	Qualification	FHJ	BOB	BRE	CAN
1	(Denmark) Fortuna Hjørring	3	3	0	0	17	0	+17	9	Advance to quarter-finals	—	3–0	9–0	5–0
2	(Belarus) Bobruichanka Bobruisk (H)	3	2	0	1	9	5	+4	6		–	—	3–2	6–0
3	(Iceland) Breiðablik	3	1	0	2	4	12	−8	3		–	–	—	–
4	(Moldova) Codru Anenii Noi	3	0	0	3	0	13	−13	0		–	–	0–2	—

Source: RSSSF
(H) Hosts

==== Group 7 ====
Pos	Team	Pld	W	D	L	GF	GA	GD	Pts	Qualification	ARS	LEV	GBA	EEN
1	(England) Arsenal (H)	3	3	0	0	15	1	+14	9	Advance to quarter-finals	—	2–1	6–0	7–0
2	(Spain) Levante	3	2	0	1	11	3	+8	6		–	—	2–1	–
3	(Azerbaijan) Gömrükçü Baku	3	1	0	2	9	8	+1	3		–	–	—	–
4	(Belgium) Eendracht Aalst	3	0	0	3	0	23	−23	0		–	0–8	0–8	—

Source: RSSSF
(H) Hosts

==== Group 8 ====
Pos	Team	Pld	W	D	L	GF	GA	GD	Pts	Qualification	CVS	DEZ	KIL	INN
1	(Russia) CSK VVS Samara	3	2	1	0	7	0	+7	7	Advance to quarter-finals	—	3–0	–	–
2	(Portugal) 1.º de Dezembro	3	2	0	1	4	4	0	6		–	—	–	–
3	(Scotland) Kilmarnock	3	1	1	1	4	3	+1	4		0–0	0–2	—	–
4	(Austria) Innsbruck (H)	3	0	0	3	2	10	−8	0		0–4	1–2	1–4	—

Source: RSSSF
(H) Hosts

== Knockout phase ==
=== Bracket ===
Quarter-finals
(Sweden) Umeå	2	0	2
(France) Toulouse	0	0	0
(Finland) HJK	0	0	0
(Germany) Frankfurt	2	8	10
(Norway) Trondheims-Ørn	2	0	2
(Denmark) Fortuna Hjørring	2	1	3
(Russia) CSK VVS Samara	0	1	1
(England) Arsenal	2	1	3

Semi-finals
(Sweden) Umeå	1	1	2 (7)
(Germany) Frankfurt	1	1	2 (6)
(Denmark) Fortuna Hjørring	3	5	8
(England) Arsenal	1	1	2

Final
(Sweden) Umeå	4	3	7
(Denmark) Fortuna Hjørring	1	0	1

=== Quarter-finals ===
Team 1	Agg.	Team 2	1st leg	2nd leg
Umeå (Sweden)	2–0	(France) Toulouse	2–0	0–0
HJK (Finland)	0–10	(Germany) Frankfurt	0–2	0–8
Trondheims-Ørn (Norway)	2–3	(Denmark) Fortuna Hjørring	2–2	0–1
CSK VVS Samara (Russia)	1–3	(England) Arsenal	0–2	1–1

=== Semi-finals ===
Team 1	Agg.	Team 2	1st leg	2nd leg
Umeå (Sweden)	2–2 (7–6 p)	(Germany) Frankfurt	1–1	1–1 (a.e.t.)
Fortuna Hjørring (Denmark)	8–2	(England) Arsenal	3–1	5–1

=== Final ===
Team 1	Agg.	Team 2	1st leg	2nd leg
Umeå (Sweden)	7–1	(Denmark) Fortuna Hjørring	4–1	3–0

9 June 2003
16:00 (CET)

Umeå (Sweden)	4–1	(Denmark) Fortuna Hjørring
Ljungberg 40', 49'; Östberg 53'; Kalmari 63'	Report	Madsen 21'

Gammliavallen, Umeå
Attendance: 7,648
Referee: Elke Günthner (Germany)
21 June 2003
16:00 (CET)

Fortuna Hjørring (Denmark)	0–3	(Sweden) Umeå
	Report	Moström 4' (pen.); Kalmari 35'; Ljungberg 71'

Hjørring Stadium, Hjørring
Attendance: 2,119
Referee: Wendy Toms (England)

Umeå won 7–1 on aggregate.

UEFA Women's Cup
2002–03 winners

First title

== Top goalscorers ==
Rank	Player	Team	Goals
1	(Sweden) Hanna Ljungberg	Umeå	10
2	(Norway) Heidi Pedersen	Trondheims-Ørn	6
2	(Germany) Birgit Prinz	Frankfurt	6
2	(Denmark) Christina Bonde	Fortuna Hjørring	6
5	(Poland) Liliana Gibek	AZS Wrocław	5
5	(Germany) Pia Wunderlich	Frankfurt	5
