= Lyudmyla Lemeshko =

Ukrainian footballer

Personal information
- Full name: Lyudmyla Olegovna Lemeshko
- Date of birth: 12 November 1979 (age 46)
- Place of birth: Chernihiv, Ukrainian SSR, Soviet Union
- Position: Midfielder

Senior career*
Years	Team	Apps	(Gls)
1995–2004	Lehenda Chernihiv	125	(9)
2004–2005	Gömrükçü Baku		
2005–2008	Ryazan		
2009	Izmailovo	10	(0)
2010	Lehenda Chernihiv	11	(2)
2011–	Zorky Krasnogorsk	16	(1)

International career^{‡}
	Ukraine U18	2	(1)
1997–2011	Ukraine	12	(0)

Managerial career
- 2026–: SDIuShOR Iunist Chernihiv
- * Club domestic league appearances and goals ‡ National team caps and goals as of 24 November 2011

Lyudmyla Lemeshko (born 12 November 1979) is a Ukrainian football midfielder, currently playing for Zorky Krasnogorsk in the Russian Championship. She has also played for Lehenda Chernihiv, Gömrükçü Baku, Ryazan VDV and ShVSM Izmailovo, winning five Ukrainian Leagues with Lehenda.

She is a member of the Ukrainian national team since 1997, and took part in the 2009 European Championship.

On 20 September 2024, Lemeshko received her UEFA A coaching license.

== Honours ==
Lehenda Chernihiv

- Ukrainian Women's League: 2000, 2001, 2002
- Women's Cup: 2001, 2002

Individual

- Best Player of Lehenda Chernihiv (1): 1996
