= Ayshea Martyn =

Welsh footballer

Personal information
- Position: Forward

International career
Years	Team	Apps	(Gls)
	Wales	26	(5)

Ayshea Martyn is a retired Welsh footballer who played for Arsenal. Martyn represented Wales 26 times and scored 5 times. Since retiring from professional football Martyn has worked as a Care worker manager. In 2024, Ayshea Martyn won Freedom of Barry award.
