= Julie Fletcher =

English footballer

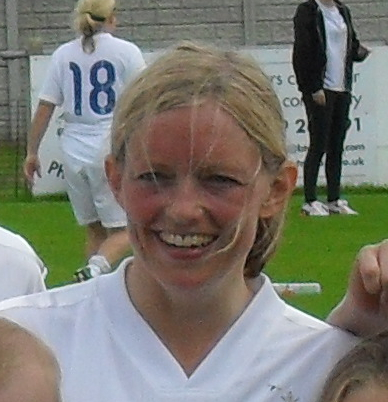

Personal information
- Full name: Julie Fletcher
- Place of birth: England
- Height: 5 ft 5 in (1.65 m)
- Position: Defender

Youth career
- Elms FC

Senior career*
Years	Team	Apps	(Gls)
1989–1997	Millwall Lionesses		
1997–2001	Charlton Athletic		
2001–2003	Arsenal		
2003–2004	Charlton Athletic		

International career
1994 -2002;	England	30	(0)
- * Club domestic league appearances and goals

Julie Fletcher born in Dulwich, is a former English footballer, and former England international player. A full-back comfortable on either flank, Fletcher began her career with ten years at Millwall Lionesses. During her career she won the Women's FA Cup three times.

== Career ==
Fletcher was a member of the England squad for the 1995 FIFA Women's World Cup, having made her debut in a 4–0 defeat to Sweden in May 1995. She was also selected for the 2001 UEFA Women's Championship. Fletcher was England's regular left–back under the management of Hope Powell. At Millwall she won the Women's FA Cup in 1991 and for a second time in 1997 when they beat Wembley at Upton Park.

After joining Croydon in 1997, Fletcher won the Premier League twice and the FA Women's Cup once in 2000 when Croydon beat Doncaster Belles at Bramall Lane, before Croydon came under the auspices of Charlton Athletic in 2000. She quit Charlton for Arsenal in December 2001, in the aftermath of a huge squad bust-up. In November 2003 Fletcher returned to Charlton, turning out against Arsenal in that season's FA Women's Cup final.

She was allotted 102 when the FA announced the legacy numbers scheme to honour the 50th anniversary of England's inaugural international.

== Honours ==
=== Millwall Lionesses ===
- FA Women's Cup: 1991, 1997

=== Croydon ===
- FA Women's Cup: 2000
