= Shankill United Predators F.C. =

- Full name: Shankill United Predators Football Club
- Founded: 1990's (as Predators F.C.)
- Ground: Hammer Park, Belfast
- League: Women's Championship

Shankill United Predators Football Club is a women's association football club based in Belfast, Northern Ireland and play at Hammer Park. They were founded in the 1990s as Predators F.C. and have undergone a number of name changes since foundation. They currently play in the Women's Championship after being relegated from the Women's Premier League in 2014.

== History ==
Predators F.C. was founded in the 1990s by Sandy Shaw after becoming a coach. Realizing that the club could have an advantage by affiliating with established men's clubs, she negotiated a partnership with Lisburn Distillery F.C. for Predators to become their women's team. The team was renamed Lisburn Distillery Predators as a result. Between 1999 and 2002, Lisburn Distillery Predators won the NIWFA Premier League three times and also became the first Northern Irish team to play in the UEFA Women's Cup. In 2006, the partnership with Lisburn Distillery was ended and the club were renamed Newbridge Predators. During this time, they left Lisburn and moved to Hammer Park in Belfast.

In 2013, Newbridge Predators finished bottom of the Women's Premier League. However they were not relegated as Fermanagh Mallards were ejected from the league by the Northern Ireland Women's Football Association due to failing to fulfil league fixtures negating a need for relegation. In 2014, Newbridge Predators became affiliated with Shankill United F.C. and were renamed as Shankill United Predators. During this season, they were relegated from the Women's Premier League for the first time after finishing 7th and lost the promotion/relegation play-off against Sion Swifts 6-1 on aggregate.
