= Jo Price =

Welsh footballer and rugby union player

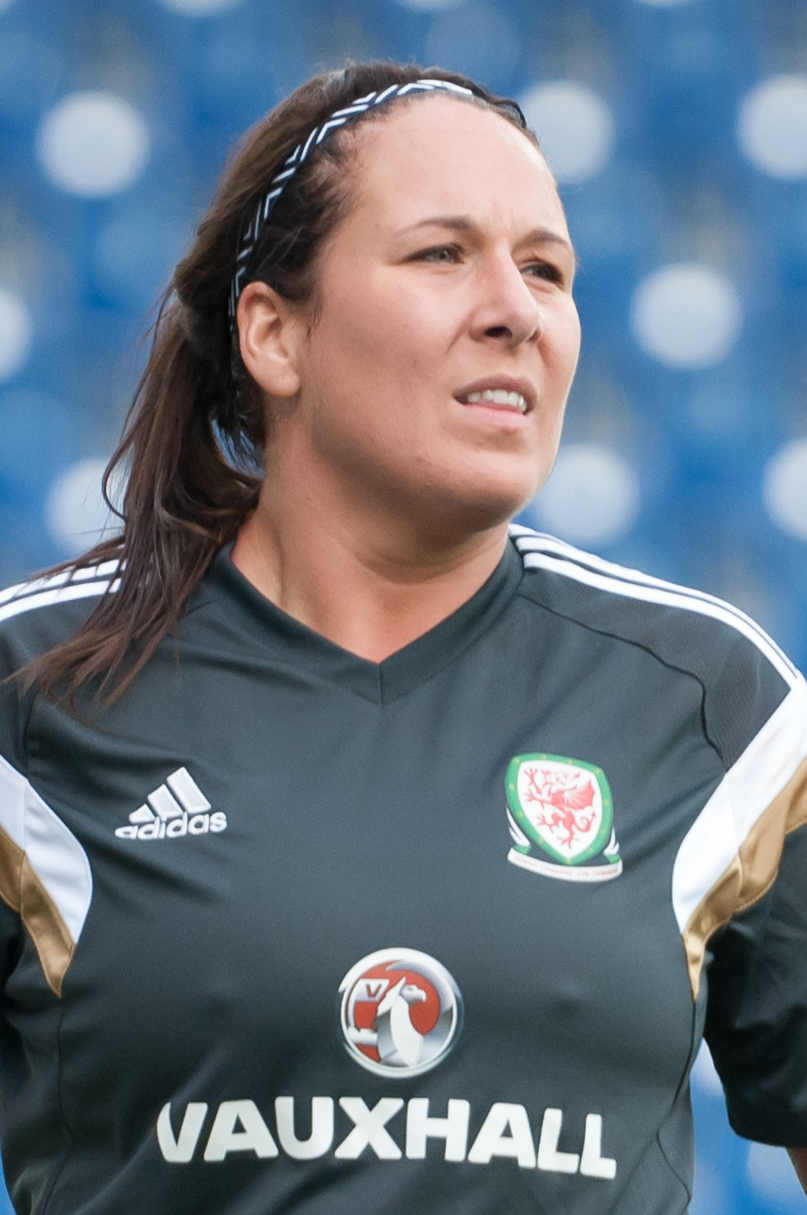
- Price in 2015

Personal information
- Full name: Joanna Price
- Date of birth: 7 June 1985 (age 41)
- Place of birth: St Davids, Wales
- Position: Goalkeeper

Youth career
- Goodwick United
- Haverfordwest County

Senior career*
Years	Team	Apps	(Gls)
- Arsenal
- Bristol City

International career
- Wales
- * Club domestic league appearances and goals

Joanna Price (born 7 June 1985) is a Welsh rugby union player and former footballer.

As a footballer, she was capped by the Wales national team.

== Early life ==
Price was born in St Davids, Wales, as one of four children to Mervyn and Marika Price. She attended Ysgol Bro Dewi and Ysgol Dewi Sant. Her father was a keen rugby player who was a prop for St. Davids RFC, playing alongside his brother Gareth. Her two brothers, Nicholas and David, both played football for the city's football team and her elder sister Katie played hockey.

== Football career ==
Price began playing for local amateur side Goodwick United before moving on to Haverfordwest County. At the age of 16, she wrote to Arsenal in the hope of gaining a trial at the club. She received a reply eight weeks later and was invited to the club's training ground in Colney Heath where she impressed enough to be offered a place in their junior team. She remained with the club for three-and-a-half seasons before joining Bristol City in order to be closer to South Wales to start a sports coaching degree at UWIC.

After a "five year sabbatical" from football, Jayne Ludlow called Price up for a national team training camp in 2015. She started for Wales in their first UEFA Women's Euro 2017 qualifying match against Austria, a 3–0 defeat in Sankt Pölten.

== Rugby career ==
While studying at UWIC, Price was contacted by the university's Rugby coach who asked her to try out for the side. She was selected in the university side for the British Universities Sports Association Cup and played in the semi-final and final as her side claimed the trophy.

In 2012, she attended a training session with Haverfordwest after the side appealed for more players.
