= Leanne Champ =

English footballer and coach

Personal information
- Full name: Leanne Kelly Champ
- Date of birth: 10 August 1983 (age 43)
- Place of birth: Portsmouth, England
- Positions: Defender; midfielder

Senior career*
Years	Team	Apps	(Gls)
2000–2001	Millwall Lionesses		
2001–2008	Arsenal		
2008–2009	Millwall Lionesses		
2009–2011	Chelsea		
2010	→ Pali Blues (loan)	2	(0)
2012	Philadelphia Fever	9	(1)
2013	Millwall Lionesses		
2013	North Jersey Valkyries	7	(0)

International career^{‡}
2003–2004	England	10	(0)

Managerial career
- 2017–: Boston Breakers
- * Club domestic league appearances and goals ‡ National team caps and goals as of 11 April 2017

Leanne Kelly Champ (born 10 August 1983) is an English football player and coach, who last played for North Jersey Valkyries of the North American W-League. A tough-tackling full back who can also play in midfield, Champ previously played for FA WSL club Chelsea Ladies, Arsenal and Pali Blues as well as spending three spells with Millwall Lionesses. She has also represented England at youth and senior level. She is now the Pro Team Second Assistant Coach and Breakers College Academy Coach for the Boston Breakers in the NWSL.

== Club career ==
Champ began her career with nine years at Millwall Lionesses, moving to Arsenal in 2001. She spent six years with Arsenal, working in the club laundry when not playing, before returning to Millwall during 2007–08. Champ had sat out Arsenal's quadruple-winning 2006–07 season with an anterior cruciate ligament injury. In the 2008–09 season, she helped Millwall to the FA Women's Premier League Southern Division title, and with it a return to the FA Women's Premier League National Division. Early in the 2009–10 campaign Champ switched to Chelsea and scored against former club Arsenal in a 3–2 home League defeat in November 2009.

She played for North American W-League club Pali Blues in summer 2010. She returned to Chelsea for the inaugural 2011 FA WSL and played in 13 of the club's 14 league matches. In 2012 Champ played for Philadelphia Fever in America's Women's Premier Soccer League Elite (WPSL Elite). She agreed a brief return to Millwall in January 2013, before heading off again to America in April 2013, with North Jersey Valkyries.

In 2014 Champ was employed as a soccer coach by the Boston Breakers. She coached the National Women's Soccer League club's academy teams and intended to play for the reserve team as player-coach.

== International career ==
Champ played for England in the 2002 FIFA U-19 Women's World Championship and reached the quarter-final. She had previously won seven caps at U-16 level, and by 2001–02 was an established member of the senior squad.

In February 2003 Champ made her Senior debut in a 1–0 friendly defeat in Italy.

She has 10 caps for England.

She was given number 145 when the FA announced their legacy numbers scheme to honour the 50th anniversary of England’s inaugural international.

== Coaching career ==
Leanne is a new member of the 2017 Boston Breakers coaching staff, serving as both the Pro Team Second Assistant Coach and the Breakers College Academy Coach as "part of the player identification and scouting network for both Boston Breakers senior teams, and Academy teams."

== Personal life ==
Champ worked as a postwoman in her native Kent.
