= Maria Dyatchkova =

Russian footballer (born 1982)

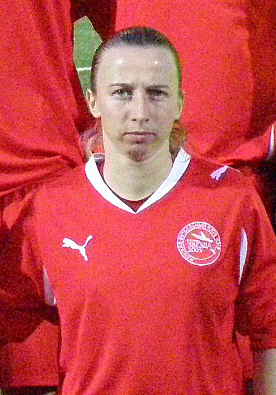

Personal information
- Full name: Maria Dyatchkova
- Date of birth: 26 May 1982 (age 44)
- Place of birth: Moscow, Soviet Union
- Height: 1.60 m (5 ft 3 in)
- Position: Defender

Senior career*
Years	Team	Apps	(Gls)
1998–2000	Diana Moscow		
2001–2003	CSK VVS Samara	50	(13)
2004–2007	Rossiyanka		
2008–2013	Zvezda Perm	104	(4)

International career^{‡}
	Russia	28	(0)
- * Club domestic league appearances and goals ‡ National team caps and goals as of 17:45, 15 July 2013 (UTC)

Maria Dyatchkova is a Russian former football defender, who played for Zvezda Perm in the Russian Championship. She has won five championships with CSK VVS Samara, Rossiyanka and Zvezda.

She was a member of the Russian national team, but missed the 2009 European Championship due to an injury.

== Titles ==
- 5 Russian Championships (2001, 2005, 2006, 2008, 2009)
- 2 Russian Cups (2005, 2006)
