= Olga Kremleva =

Russian footballer (born 1974)

Personal information
- Full name: Olga Vladimirovna Kremleva
- Date of birth: 9 October 1974 (age 52)
- Place of birth: Soviet Union
- Height: 1.63 m (5 ft 4 in)
- Position: Midfielder

Senior career*
Years	Team	Apps	(Gls)
- Sibiryachka
- CSK VVS Samara
2005	Lada Togliatti		(10)
2006–2007	Rossiyanka		(23)
2008	EcoStrom		

International career
- Russia
- * Club domestic league appearances and goals

Olga Kremleva (or Kremlyova) is a Russian former football midfielder who played for Sibiryachka Krasnoyarsk, CSK VVS Samara, Lada Togliatti and Rossiyanka in the Russian Championship, taking part in the UEFA Women's Cup with all but the first one. She was a member of the Russian national team, playing the 2001 European Championship.
