= FC Spartak Moscow (women) =

Spartak Moscow
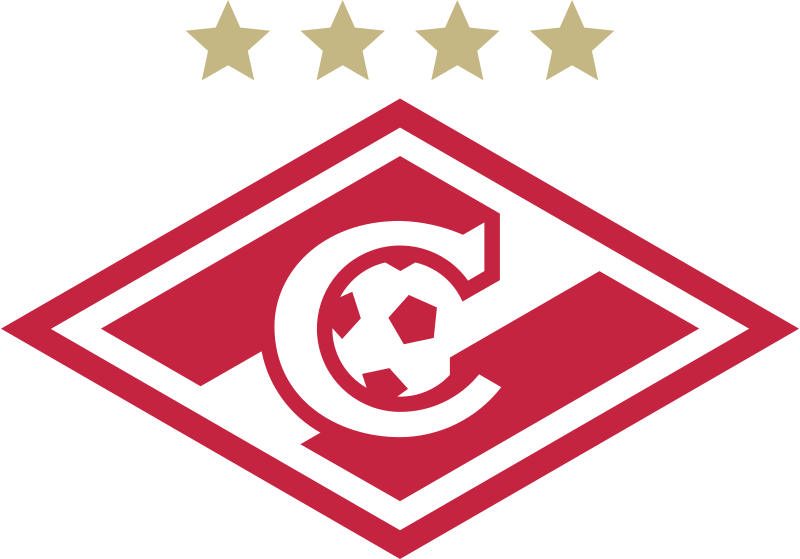
- Full name: Футбольный клуб Спартак Москва (Football Club Spartak Moscow)
- Nicknames: Gladiatory (Gladiators); Narodnaya komanda (The People's Team); Krasno-Belye (Red-and-Whites)
- Founded: 2022; 3 years ago
- League: Russian Women's Football Championship
- 2025: Champions
- Website: http://www.spartak.com/
Home colours	Away colours	Third colours

FC Spartak Moscow (Russian: Женский футбольный клуб «Спартак» Москва Москва, romanized: Futbolʹnyy klub «Spartak» Moskva, pronounced [spɐrˈtak mɐˈskva]) is the women's team of Russian football club FC Spartak Moscow, itself a branch of sports society Spartak Moscow. The club participates in the Russian Women's Football Championship, the top division of Russian women football.

== History ==
The team was founded in 2022.

== Titles ==
- Russian championship
  - Winners (1): 2025
  - Runners-up (0):
- Russian Women's Cup
  - Winners ():
  - Runners-up ():
- Russian Women's Super Cup
  - Winners ():
  - Runners-up ():
