= Christina Bonde =

Danish footballer (born 1973)

Personal information
- Full name: Christina Bonde
- Date of birth: 28 September 1973 (age 53)
- Place of birth: Copenhagen, Denmark
- Position: Midfielder

Youth career
- –1991: Sundby BK

Senior career*
Years	Team	Apps	(Gls)
1991–1992	Sundby BK		
1993–1995	Rødovre		
1995–2009	Fortuna Hjørring	207	

International career
1995–2003	Denmark	46	(9)
- * Club domestic league appearances and goals

Christina Bonde is a Danish former football midfielder who played for the Denmark football team. At club level Bonde represented A-Liga club Fortuna Hjørring for 14 years. She was named Danish Football Player of the Year in 2001.

Born in Copenhagen, Bonde was a member of the Danish national team. With the national team she took part in the 1995 World Cup, the 1996 Summer Olympics and the 2001 European Championship,
