= CSK VVS Samara (women's football) =

Russian women's football club

- Full name: FC CSK VVS Samara
- Nickname: The Pilots
- Founded: 1988; 38 years ago
- Dissolved: 2004; 22 years ago
- Ground: CSK VVS
- Capacity: 2'500
- Chairman: (Russia) Razia Nurkenova
- League: First Division
- 2013: 5th
- Website: http://csk-vvs.narod.ru
Home colours	Away colours

CSK VVS Samara was a Russian women's football club from Samara. Founded in 1988 in the Kazakh SSR, it took part in the two editions of the Soviet championship as SKA Almaty, but following the collapse of the Soviet Union it was relocated to Togliatti and then Samara.

CSK VVS was one of the most successful teams in the new Russian women's football championship, winning three titles between 1993 and 1996, and a fourth one in 2001. The team made its European debut the following year, but it was disbanded in 2004.

== Honours ==
=== Titles ===
- 4 Russian Leagues (1993, 1994, 1996, 2001)
- 1 Russian Cup (1994)

=== Other results ===
- For a detailed international record see Russian women's football clubs in international football

Russian Championship
Place	Year
2nd	1992, 1995, 1997, 1998
3rd	1999, 2000, 2003
6th	2002
7th	2004

Russian Cup
Result	Year
Runner-up	1995, 1996, 2002
Semifinals	1993, 1999, 2000, 2003, 2004
Quarterfinals	1997, 1998, 2001
Round of 16	1992

=== Record in UEFA competitions ===
Season	Competition	Stage	Result	Opponent	Scorers
2002-03	UEFA Women's Cup	Preliminary stage	0-0	(Scotland) Kilmarnock	—
2002-03	UEFA Women's Cup	Preliminary stage	4-0	(Austria) Innsbrucker Athletic Club-FC Tiroler Loden	Dyatchkova 7', Kremleva 31', Egorova 65', Dzharbolova 69'
2002-03	UEFA Women's Cup	Preliminary stage	3-0	(Portugal) 1º Dezembro	Kremleva 2', 33', Grigorieva 76'
2002-03	UEFA Women's Cup	Quarter-finals	0-2	(England) Arsenal	Petko 5' (o.g.), MacDonald 14'
2002-03	UEFA Women's Cup	Quarter-finals	1-1	(England) Arsenal	Kremleva 26' — Maggs 17'

== Former internationals ==
- (Russia) Alexandra Svetlitskaia
- (Russia) Anastasia Kostyukova
- (Russia) Anastasia Pozdeeva
- (Russia) Elena Fomina
- (Russia) Irina Grigorieva
- (Russia) Elvira Todua
- (Russia) Larisa Savina
- (Russia) Maria Dyatchkova
- (Russia) Marina Kolomiets
- (Russia) Nadezhda Kharchenko
- (Russia) Olga Kremleva
- (Azerbaijan) Olga Vasilyeva
- (Russia) Svetlana Petko
- (Russia) Tatiana Egorova
- (Ukraine) Veronika Shulga
