= Ellen Maggs =

English footballer

Personal information
- Full name: Ellen Louise Maggs
- Date of birth: 16 February 1983 (age 43)
- Place of birth: Islington, England
- Height: 5 ft 2 in (1.57 m)
- Position: Forward

Youth career
- Arsenal

Senior career*
Years	Team	Apps	(Gls)
2000–2004	Arsenal		
2004–2006	Birmingham City		
2006	New York Magic		
2006–2008	Watford		
2008–2009	Welwyn Garden City		
2008–2009	Haringey Borough		

International career
2003–2004	England	4	(0)
- * Club domestic league appearances and goals

Ellen Louise Maggs (born 16 February 1985) is an English former international footballer. As well as the England women's national football team, Maggs played FA Women's Premier League football for clubs including Birmingham City, Watford and Arsenal. Often described as diminutive, Maggs operated as a quick, skilful and creative forward.

== Club career ==
Maggs joined Arsenal Ladies as a nine-year-old, after being spotted at an after school football course. On seeing Maggs for the first time, Arsenal manager Vic Akers informed her father that she would one day play for England. Having grown up in nearby Islington, Maggs was already an Arsenal supporter. Aged 17, she came on as a substitute in Arsenal's 4–1 FA Women's Premier League Cup final win over Croydon in April 2000.

When Marieanne Spacey left Arsenal for Fulham in 2002, Maggs was elevated into regular first team contention. Two goals against Fulham in the televised FA Women's Community Shield underscored Maggs' potential, but minor injuries disrupted her 2002–03 campaign. After a further season at Arsenal, in which Maggs scored the League–clinching goal, Marcus Bignot signed her for his ambitious Birmingham City team in August 2004.

Maggs joined American W-League club New York Magic in June 2006, along with Birmingham teammate Laura Bassett.

In September 2006 Maggs signed for FA Women's Premier League Southern Division club Watford, managed by her former Arsenal teammate Sian Williams. She was paired in attack with Helen Lander, who later stated:

My favourite season was one at Watford where I played up front with Ellen Maggs. She was different gravy and I am told she was nowhere near her best at that stage in her career. I have no doubt that had things worked out differently for her, we would be talking about one of England's all time greats.

In 2008–09 Maggs turned out for Welwyn Garden City and Haringey Borough.

== International career ==
Maggs represented England at the 2002 FIFA U-19 Women's World Championship in Canada. A FIFA.com article said of Maggs:

With the smallest feet in the squad, diminutive striker Ellen Maggs turns up like fine dust all over the field. Gifted with a telepathic impulse for turning defenders and exploding with pace into space, the Arsenal product may well prove the future of English football – and a critical image and icon for other young British girls to look to for a role model.

She was called into the senior England squad for the first time in November 2002, when Arsenal teammate Kirsty Pealling pulled out of the World Cup qualifying play–off second leg against France.

On 19 May 2003 Maggs made her senior debut, as a 66th-minute substitute for Amanda Barr in a 4–0 defeat to Canada during a tour of North America. A second appearance came in October 2003, during a 2–2 draw in Russia.

A 2–0 friendly win over Denmark at Fratton Park in February 2004 was Maggs' first start for England. In September 2004 she featured as a substitute in another friendly, a 1–0 win over the Netherlands in Tuitjenhorn. In January 2005 Maggs was recalled to a 30–player training squad for the annual trip to La Manga Club. She missed out on selection for UEFA Women's Euro 2005 but was called into the national Under 21 squad for the Nordic Cup in July 2005.

She was allotted 149 when the FA announced their legacy numbers scheme to honour the 50th anniversary of England’s inaugural international.
