= FC Krasnoznamensk =

- Full name: Football Club Krasnoznamensk
- Founded: 1991; 34 years ago, 2013; 12 years ago
- Dissolved: 2003; 22 years ago
- League: Russian third division football, the area "Moscow region", group "B"
- 2016: Russian Second Division, Zone West, 8th

FC Krasnoznamensk (Russian: ФК «Краснознаменск») was a Russian football club from Krasnoznamensk. Acts Football Championship of Russia among the teams of the 3rd Division (Zone Moscow region, group B). It was founded in 1992. The team also presented in 1992, 1994 – Moskovsky, in 1993–1994 – Moscow, 1995–1997 – Selyatino.

== Women's team ==
The women's section won the first Russian women's football championship in 1992.

== History ==
=== 1991–1992. The debut in the championship and two ascents to First League ===
FC "Krasnoznamensk" was founded in 1992. The backbone of the team were mostly former players of FC "Moscow" from the same city Moscow oblasti. Startoval "Moscow" in the RSFSR Championship UFC commands (Zone 6) in 1991. The first match was played against "Metalist" from Rybinsk. The meeting ended with the score 0: 0. In this championship, "Moscow" took second place, just ustutupiv "Titan" Reutov, and went out into the Second Division. After that, women's football club was formed "Interros", which in 1992 made the "golden double". It was renamed the "Interros" Before the start pervensva team. In the 1992 season the team made its debut in the Second League and the Cup of Russia, but in 1/256 lost 0: 2. Lyubertsetskomu "TORGMASH". Starting the match on a semi-professional level krasnoznamentsy had a double against Lokomotiv, where vyigrali- 2: 1. The second match with the Moscow "TRASKO" "Interros" lost with the score 0: 1, and then was followed by a defeat and four wins in a row with a total result of 13–5. At the end of the season "Interros" took 3rd place and the rules should not go up to the first league, but the first place was taken by the substitute team "Spartak", with no transition in the first league rights. So, the head coach Leonid Pribylovskiy two years lifted the team up into two leagues.

=== 1993–1994. League One ===
In 1993 he was appointed head coach Alexander Irkhin. He decided to change, taking a lot of young players, including Snigirёva Alexis, became further three consecutive top scorer. The Russian Cup finals in 1/128 "Interros" lost "Asmaralu-D" 0: 1.

This fact has allowed for the following year to perform in the first league, where in 1993 the team became the bronze medal, losing to "Zenit" St.-Petersburg and Tolyatti "Lada". This achievement is by far the best in the club's history.

After due to a number of organizational and financial problems has been a decline in the team's game. It is repeated with the change of leadership is due annually in the period 1994–1997 the change of name of the club. In the period from 1996 to 2002, the team performs in the Championship of Russia among second league teams ( "Centre" zone). 2001 marked the arrival of the post of head coach Igor Shalimov team, known for performances in Moscow "Spartak" and a number of Italian clubs.

Between 2002 and 2013 the city of Krasnoznamensk was not represented on the football map of the country. At this time actively developing the local Children and Youth Sports School. It is on the basis of the 1992–1996 graduates of Youth Born was built essentially a new team representing the city in the Football Championship of Russia among third division teams (Zone Moscow region, group B), which is ranked 9th in 2014 and 5th in 2015.

Before the season 2016 there have been significant changes in the composition – the team has changed almost half. After 9 rounds krasnoznamentsy occupied the first place.

== Team name and home town history ==
- 1986–1991 FC Moskovsky
- 1992–1994 Interros Moskovsky
- 1994 Tekhinvest-M Moskovsky
- 1995 Moskovsky-Selyatino Selyatino (Moscow Oblast)
- 1996–1997 MChS-Selyatino Selyatino
- 1998 Krasnoznamensk-Selyatino Krasnoznamensk
- 1999–2002 FC Krasnoznamensk
- Since 2013 - "Youth". "FC Krasnoznamensk" exit in the group A.

== Statistics performances ==
=== the League of ===
      PFL.       LFL, Group A.       LFL, Group B.

=== Russian Championship ===
Year	League of	A place	W	D	S	Goals	spectacles	Scorers	Cup
1991	RSFSR Championship Team KFK	2	23	6	3	70-15	52	(Russia) Bogomolov Sergey – 16	—
