= 2004–05 UEFA Women's Cup qualifying round =

Tournament details
- Dates: 20 July–18 September 2004
- Teams: 43

The 2004–05 UEFA Women's Champions League qualifying round was played on 20, 22, 24 July 2004 and 14, 16 and 18 September 2004. A total of 43 teams competed in the qualifying round to decide the 8 places in the knockout phase of the 2004–05 UEFA Women's Cup.

== First qualifying round ==
=== Group A1 ===
Matches were played in Žiar nad Hronom, Slovakia.

Pos	Team	Pld	W	D	L	GF	GA	GD	Pts	Qualification	ALM	SPR	SSS	ŽNH
1	(Kazakhstan) Alma	3	3	0	0	11	2	+9	9	Advance to second qualifying round	—	2–1	5–1	–
2	(Czech Republic) Slavia Prague	3	2	0	1	8	2	+6	6		–	—	3–0	4–0
3	(Bulgaria) Super Sport Sofia	3	0	1	2	3	10	−7	1		–	–	—	2–2
4	(Slovakia) Žiar nad Hronom (H)	3	0	1	2	2	10	−8	1		0–4	–	–	—

Source: RSSSF
(H) Hosts
20 July 2004

Slavia Prague (Czech Republic)	4–0	(Slovakia) Žiar nad Hronom
Jerábková 7'; Ižová 38'; Chlumecká 45', 59'	Report

Mestský štadión, Žiar nad Hronom
20 July 2004

Alma (Kazakhstan)	5–1	(Bulgaria) Super Sport Sofia
Luchonak 27'; Astashova 31'; Minkina 71'; Aniskovtseva 78'; Li 85'	Report	Staneva 60'

Športový Areál, Ladomerská Vieska

22 July 2004

Slavia Prague (Czech Republic)	3–0	(Bulgaria) Super Sport Sofia
Chlumecká 40', 56'; Pěničková 59'	Report

Športový Areál, Ladomerská Vieska
22 July 2004

Žiar nad Hronom (Slovakia)	0–4	(Kazakhstan) Alma
	Report	Yalova 28'; Karasseva 34', 57'; Ivanova 84'

Mestský štadión, Žiar nad Hronom

24 July 2004

Alma (Kazakhstan)	2–1	(Czech Republic) Slavia Prague
Yalova 49'; Aniskovtseva 90'	Report	Zubková 1'

Športový Areál, Ladomerská Vieska
24 July 2004

Super Sport Sofia (Bulgaria)	2–2	(Slovakia) Žiar nad Hronom
Staneva 30'; Kostova 34'	Report	Dodoková 43'; Surovcova 55'

Mestský štadión, Žiar nad Hronom

=== Group A2 ===
Matches were played in Šiauliai, Lithuania.

Pos	Team	Pld	W	D	L	GF	GA	GD	Pts	Qualification	EVO	GBA	GUN	SKI
1	(Russia) Energy Voronezh	3	3	0	0	27	0	+27	9	Advance to second qualifying round	—	–	11–0	13–0
2	(Azerbaijan) Gömrükçü Baku	3	2	0	1	16	4	+12	6		0–3	—	3–0	–
3	(Lithuania) Gintra-Universitetas (H)	3	1	0	2	1	14	−13	3		–	–	—	1–0
4	(North Macedonia) Skiponjat	3	0	0	3	1	27	−26	0		–	1–13	–	—

Source: RSSSF
(H) Hosts
20 July 2004

Energy Voronezh (Russia)	13–0	(North Macedonia) Skiponjat
Zvarych 11', 64', 90'; Benson 16' (pen.), 22' (pen.), 67' (pen.); Gorbacheva 30', 52', 60', 65'; Apanashchenko 32'; Bukashkina 81'; Kozhnikova 82'	Report

Savivaldybė Stadium, Šiauliai
20 July 2004

Gömrükçü Baku (Azerbaijan)	3–0	(Lithuania) Gintra-Universitetas
Khodyreva 45', 58'; Lyshafay 55'	Report

Savivaldybė Stadium, Šiauliai

22 July 2004

Skiponjat (North Macedonia)	1–13	(Azerbaijan) Gömrükçü Baku
Erahimi 9'	Report	Ignatovitch 16'; Fedosova 17'; Bondarenko 18', 58'; Khodyreva 19'; Alieva 22'; Krylowa 27'; Lyshafay 29', 82'; Larionova 32'; Cirkhlarova 44', 45'; Ibadullayeva 74'

Savivaldybė Stadium, Šiauliai
22 July 2004

Energy Voronezh (Russia)	11–0	(Lithuania) Gintra-Universitetas
Gorbacheva 17'; Terekhova 30', 47'; Benson 35'; Lamtyugina 59'; Apanashchenko 62', 80'; Zinchenko 65', 85', 88', 90'	Report

Savivaldybė Stadium, Šiauliai

24 July 2004

Gömrükçü Baku (Azerbaijan)	0–3	(Russia) Energy Voronezh
	Report	Terekhova 4', 31'; Apanashchenko 12'

Aukštaitija Stadium, Panevėžys
24 July 2004

Gintra-Universitetas (Lithuania)	1–0	(North Macedonia) Skiponjat
Kerpienė 63'	Report

Savivaldybė Stadium, Šiauliai

=== Group A3 ===
Matches were played in Bobruisk, Belarus.

Pos	Team	Pld	W	D	L	GF	GA	GD	Pts	Qualification	BOB	CAN	VIK	PAR
1	(Belarus) Bobruichanka Bobruisk (H)	3	3	0	0	7	2	+5	9	Advance to second qualifying round	—	2–0	–	2–1
2	(Moldova) Codru Anenii Noi	3	1	1	1	6	4	+2	4		–	—	1–1	–
3	(Hungary) Viktória FC-Szombathely	3	1	1	1	6	4	+2	4		1–3	–	—	4–0
4	(Estonia) Pärnu JK	3	0	0	3	2	11	−9	0		–	1–5	–	—

Source: RSSSF
(H) Hosts
20 July 2004

Bobruichanka Bobruisk (Belarus)	2–0	(Moldova) Codru Anenii Noi
Shramok 56'; Nahornaya 70'	Report

Traktor Stadium, Minsk
20 July 2004

Viktória FC-Szombathely (Hungary)	4–0	(Estonia) Pärnu JK
Tóth 27'; Görög 62'; Szekér 70'	Report

Dinamo-Yuni Stadium, Minsk

22 July 2004

Codru Anenii Noi (Moldova)	1–1	(Hungary) Viktória FC-Szombathely
Pufulete 6'	Report	Weisz 38'

Dinamo-Yuni Stadium, Minsk
22 July 2004

Bobruichanka Bobruisk (Belarus)	2–1	(Estonia) Pärnu JK
Novikova 69', 85'	Report	Morkovkina 88'

Traktor Stadium, Minsk

24 July 2004

Viktória FC-Szombathely (Hungary)	1–3	(Belarus) Bobruichanka Bobruisk
Weisz 12'	Report	Shramok 40'; Lis 50'; Volkava 59'

Traktor Stadium, Minsk
24 July 2004

Pärnu JK (Estonia)	1–5	(Moldova) Codru Anenii Noi
Morkovkina 14'	Report	Pufulete 12', 57'; Rusu 66'; Grajdean 80'; Slonova 81'

Dinamo-Yuni Stadium, Minsk

=== Group A4 ===
Matches were played in Krško, Slovenia.

Pos	Team	Pld	W	D	L	GF	GA	GD	Pts	Qualification	KRK	KR	TLE	MPS
1	(Slovenia) KRKA Novo Mesto (H)	3	2	0	1	4	4	0	6	Advance to second qualifying round	—	2–1	–	–
2	(Iceland) KR	3	2	0	1	5	3	+2	6		–	—	–	3–1
3	(Netherlands) Ter Leede	3	1	1	1	3	2	+1	4		2–0	0–1	—	–
4	(Finland) MPS	3	0	1	2	3	6	−3	1		1–2	–	1–1	—

Source: RSSSF
(H) Hosts
20 July 2004

Ter Leede (Netherlands)	0–1	(Iceland) KR
	Report	Magnúsdóttir 77'

20 July 2004

MPS (Finland)	1–2	(Slovenia) KRKA Novo Mesto
Bergman 75'	Report	Vais 29'; Todorovic 61'

Matija Gubec Stadium, Krško

22 July 2004

KR (Iceland)	3–1	(Finland) MPS
G. Jónsdóttir 31'; Atladóttir 41'; A. Jónsdóttir 84'	Report	Kaaranen 85'

Matija Gubec Stadium, Krško
22 July 2004

Ter Leede (Netherlands)	2–0	(Slovenia) KRKA Novo Mesto
van Eijk 39', 53'	Report

Matija Gubec Stadium, Krško

24 July 2004

KRKA Novo Mesto (Slovenia)	2–1	(Iceland) KR
Jovanovic 9'; Makowska 63'	Report	G. Jónsdóttir 25'

Matija Gubec Stadium, Krško
24 July 2004

MPS (Finland)	1–1	(Netherlands) Ter Leede
Hyyrynen 90+3'	Report	Drommel 80'

Brežice Stadium, Brežice

=== Group A5 ===
Matches were played in Wezemaal, Belgium.

Pos	Team	Pld	W	D	L	GF	GA	GD	Pts	Qualification	MCN	HIB	WEZ	MAK
1	(Serbia and Montenegro) Masinac Classic Niš	3	3	0	0	10	2	+8	9	Advance to second qualifying round	—	–	4–1	2–0
2	(Scotland) Hibernian	3	2	0	1	9	6	+3	6		1–4	—	–	5–0
3	(Belgium) Rapide Wezemaal (H)	3	1	0	2	5	7	−2	3		–	2–3	—	–
4	(Croatia) Maksimir	3	0	0	3	0	9	−9	0		–	–	0–2	—

Source: RSSSF
(H) Hosts
20 July 2004

Hibernian (Scotland)	5–0	(Croatia) Maksimir
McWhinnie 4', 40', 62'; Ferguson 19'; Cook 50'	Report

Vleugtweg, Wezemaal
20 July 2004

Masinac Classic Niš (Serbia and Montenegro)	4–1	(Belgium) Rapide Wezemaal
Mitic 10', 79'; Jovanović 16'; Smiljković 20'	Report	Meeus 67'

Vleugtweg, Wezemaal

22 July 2004

Masinac Classic Niš (Serbia and Montenegro)	2–0	(Croatia) Maksimir
A. Mladenovic 43'; Mitic 45'	Report

Vleugtweg, Wezemaal
22 July 2004

Rapide Wezemaal (Belgium)	2–3	(Scotland) Hibernian
Maes 8'; Verelst 19'	Report	Ferguson 7'; Ralph 47'; McWhinnie 64'

Vleugtweg, Wezemaal

24 July 2004

Hibernian (Scotland)	1–4	(Serbia and Montenegro) Masinac Classic Niš
Ferguson 84'	Report	Mitic 37'; Jovanović 76'; Mladenovic 79'; Tomic 90'

Van Weyenberghstadion, Tremelo
24 July 2004

Maksimir (Croatia)	0–2	(Belgium) Rapide Wezemaal
	Report	Meeus 18', 85'

Vleugtweg, Wezemaal

=== Group A6 ===
Matches were played in Wrocław, Poland.

Pos	Team	Pld	W	D	L	GF	GA	GD	Pts	Qualification	WRO	MKH	KIK	CAR
1	(Poland) AZS Wrocław (H)	3	3	0	0	9	2	+7	9	Advance to second qualifying round	—	2–0	–	2–1
2	(Ukraine) Metalist Kharkiv	3	2	0	1	10	4	+6	6		–	—	2–1	8–1
3	(Faroe Islands) KÍ Klaksvík	3	1	0	2	6	7	−1	3		1–5	–	—	–
4	(Wales) Cardiff City	3	0	0	3	2	14	−12	0		–	–	0–4	—

Source: RSSSF
(H) Hosts
20 July 2004

(Ukraine) Metalist Kharkiv	2–1	(Faroe Islands) KÍ Klaksvík
Mykhaylenko 71', 84'	Report	Ran. Andreasen 47'

Olympic Stadium, Wrocław
20 July 2004

(Poland) AZS Wrocław	2–1	(Wales) Cardiff City
Otrębska 4'; Pożerska 63'	Report	Fishlock 31' (pen.)

Olympic Stadium, Wrocław

22 July 2004

(Ukraine) Metalist Kharkiv	8–1	(Wales) Cardiff City
Pekur 12', 15', 32', 41', 78'; Tatarinova 42'; Djatel 48'; Mozolska 90'	Report	Miller 27'

Olympic Stadium, Wrocław
22 July 2004

KÍ Klaksvík (Faroe Islands)	1–5	(Poland) AZS Wrocław
Ran. Andreasen 58'	Report	Otrębska 5'; Pożerska 23', 90'; Gibek 63'; Nazarczyk 79'

GEM Boiska, Wrocław

24 July 2004

Cardiff City (Wales)	0–4	(Faroe Islands) KÍ Klaksvík
	Report	Skaale Klakstein 23'; Josephsen 43', 52'; Andreasen 60'

Olympic Stadium, Wrocław
24 July 2004

AZS Wrocław (Poland)	2–0	(Ukraine) Metalist Kharkiv
Otrębska 49', 80'	Report

GEM Boiska, Wrocław

=== Group A7 ===
Matches were played in Cluj, Romania.

Pos	Team	Pld	W	D	L	GF	GA	GD	Pts	Qualification	NES	CLU	MHO	NEW
1	(Spain) Athletic Club Neskak	3	2	1	0	16	4	+12	7	Advance to second qualifying round	—	–	1–1	10–3
2	(Romania) Clujana Cluj-Napoca (H)	3	1	1	1	3	5	−2	4		0–5	—	0–0	–
3	(Israel) Maccabi Holon	3	0	3	0	3	3	0	3		–	–	—	2–2
4	(Northern Ireland) Newtownabbey Strikers	3	0	1	2	5	15	−10	1		–	0–3	–	—

Source: RSSSF
(H) Hosts
20 July 2004

Athletic Club Neskak (Spain)	10–3	(Northern Ireland) Newtownabbey Strikers
Orueta 5'; Zabala 14'; Fernández 21'; Sánchez 46', 79' (pen.); Onaindia 54'; Roden 82' (o.g.); Iturregi 84'; Ferreira 89'; Vázquez 90'	Report	Clarke 2'; McKenna 23'; Stewart 71'

Stadionul Mihai Adam, Câmpia Turzii
20 July 2004

Clujana Cluj-Napoca (Romania)	0–0	(Israel) Maccabi Holon
	Report

Dr. Constantin Rădulescu Stadium, Gruia

22 July 2004

Athletic Club Neskak (Spain)	1–1	(Israel) Maccabi Holon
Juaristi 37'	Report	Fahima 45'

Stadionul Mihai Adam, Câmpia Turzii
22 July 2004

Newtownabbey Strikers (Northern Ireland)	0–3	(Romania) Clujana Cluj-Napoca
	Report	Serban 53'; Striblea 63'; McAlorum 87' (o.g.)

Unirea Stadium, Dej

24 July 2004

Clujana Cluj-Napoca (Romania)	0–5	(Spain) Athletic Club Neskak
	Report	Fernández 4', 77'; Orueta 9'; Vázquez 56', 75'

Stadionul Mihai Adam, Câmpia Turzii
24 July 2004

Maccabi Holon (Israel)	2–2	(Northern Ireland) Newtownabbey Strikers
Jan 51'; Bendel 58'	Report	McKenna 25'; Stewart 83'

Unirea Stadium, Dej

=== Group A8 ===
Matches were played in Sarajevo, Bosnia and Herzegovina.

Pos	Team	Pld	W	D	L	GF	GA	GD	Pts	Qualification	AEG	ZUC	SAR	PLE
1	(Greece) Aegina	3	3	0	0	10	0	+10	9	Advance to second qualifying round	—	1–0	–	7–0
2	(Switzerland) Zuchwil	3	2	0	1	17	2	+15	6		–	—	4–0	13–1
3	(Bosnia and Herzegovina) SFK Sarajevo (H)	3	1	0	2	5	6	−1	3		0–2	–	—	–
4	(Cyprus) PAOK Ledra	3	0	0	3	1	25	−24	0		–	–	0–5	—

Source: RSSSF
(H) Hosts
20 July 2004

Zuchwil (Switzerland)	4–0	(Bosnia and Herzegovina) SFK Sarajevo
Gysin 24'; Vögeli 35', 45'; Marra 68'	Report

Stadion Hakija Mršo, Vogošća
20 July 2004

Aegina (Greece)	7–0	(Cyprus) PAOK Ledra
Stojanović 20', 31'; Stojiljković 29'; Zouzouli 39', 44'; Zafeiropoulou 83'; Bentoumi 86'	Report

Koševo City Stadium, Koševo

22 July 2004

Zuchwil (Switzerland)	13–1	(Cyprus) PAOK Ledra
Schaufelbühl 7', 24'; Affolter 9'; Marra 20', 74', 90'; Marti 49'; Vögeli 50' (pen.), 65'; Schaer 67', 76', 90+2'; Daetwyler 88'	Report	Modestou 11'

Stadion Hakija Mršo, Vogošća
22 July 2004

SFK Sarajevo (Bosnia and Herzegovina)	0–2	(Greece) Aegina
	Report	Stojiljković 38' (pen.); Bentoumi 80'

Koševo City Stadium, Koševo

24 July 2004

PAOK Ledra (Cyprus)	0–5	(Bosnia and Herzegovina) SFK Sarajevo
	Report	Kapetanovic 47', 60'; Fetahović 70'; Vlajic 74'; Aščerić 90'

Stadion Hakija Mršo, Vogošća
24 July 2004

Aegina (Greece)	1–0	(Switzerland) Zuchwil
Brisimi 90'	Report

Koševo City Stadium, Koševo

=== Group A9 ===
Matches were played in Vendargues, France.

Pos	Team	Pld	W	D	L	GF	GA	GD	Pts	Qualification	MON	NEU	DEZ	UCD
1	(France) Montpellier (H)	3	3	0	0	13	0	+13	9	Advance to second qualifying round	—	7–0	–	5–0
2	(Austria) Neulengbach	3	2	0	1	7	10	−3	6		–	—	–	4–2
3	(Portugal) 1.º de Dezembro	3	0	1	2	2	5	−3	1		0–1	1–3	—	–
4	(Republic of Ireland) University College Dublin	3	0	1	2	3	10	−7	1		–	–	1–1	—

Source: RSSSF
(H) Hosts
20 July 2004

Montpellier (France)	5–0	(Republic of Ireland) University College Dublin
Lattaf 16', 61'; Faisandier 31'; Ayachi 71'; Ramos 90+1'	Report

Stade Guillaume Didès, Vendargues
20 July 2004

1.º de Dezembro (Portugal)	1–3	(Austria) Neulengbach
Couto 18'	Report	Hufnagl 15'; Gstöttner 33'; Liése Brancão 55'

Stade Guillaume Didès, Vendargues

22 July 2004

Montpellier (France)	7–0	(Austria) Neulengbach
Ramos 2', 23'; Lacaze 36'; Bompastor 56', 81'; Lattaf 59', 90+3'	Report

Stade Guillaume Didès, Vendargues
22 July 2004

University College Dublin (Republic of Ireland)	1–1	(Portugal) 1.º de Dezembro
Sweeney 90+3'	Report	Couto 5'

Stade Guillaume Didès, Vendargues

24 July 2004

1.º de Dezembro (Portugal)	0–1	(France) Montpellier
	Report	Ramos 86'

Stade Guillaume Didès, Vendargues
24 July 2004

Neulengbach (Austria)	4–2	(Republic of Ireland) University College Dublin
Brand 33', 61'; Celouch 51'; Gajdošová 90+2'	Report	Kissane 26', 89'

Stade Claude Béal, Montpellier

== Second qualifying round ==
=== Group B1 ===
Matches were played in Niš, Serbia.

Pos	Team	Pld	W	D	L	GF	GA	GD	Pts	Qualification	UME	BOB	MCN	KRK
1	(Sweden) Umeå	3	3	0	0	20	2	+18	9	Advance to quarter-finals	—	5–1	–	7–1
2	(Belarus) Bobruichanka Bobruisk	3	1	1	1	5	5	0	4	Advance to quarter-finals	–	—	–	4–0
3	(Serbia and Montenegro) Masinac Classic Niš (H)	3	1	1	1	2	8	−6	4		0–8	0–0	—	–
4	(Slovenia) KRKA Novo Mesto	3	0	0	3	1	13	−12	0		–	–	0–2	—

Source: RSSSF
(H) Hosts
14 September 2004

Umeå (Sweden)	7–1	(Slovenia) KRKA Novo Mesto
Ljungberg 9', 18', 28', 42'; Eriksson 23'; Makowska 75' (o.g.); Nordbrandt 78'	Report	Jovanovic 66'

Čair Stadium, Niš
14 September 2004

Masinac Classic Niš (Serbia and Montenegro)	0–0	(Belarus) Bobruichanka Bobruisk
	Report

Čair Stadium, Niš

16 September 2004

Umeå (Sweden)	5–1	(Belarus) Bobruichanka Bobruisk
Kapstad 21'; Lindqvist 34'; Sjöström 42'; Julin 44'; Marta 73'	Report	Kazeeva 74'

Čair Stadium, Niš
16 September 2004

KRKA Novo Mesto (Slovenia)	0–2	(Serbia and Montenegro) Masinac Classic Niš
	Report	Ivanović 44'; Mladenovic 82'

Čair Stadium, Niš

18 September 2004

Masinac Classic Niš (Serbia and Montenegro)	0–8	(Sweden) Umeå
	Report	Bergkvist 2'; Lindqvist 3', 6'; Östberg 18'; Kalmari 32'; Marta 65'; Ljungberg 70'; Paulson 75'

Čair Stadium, Niš
18 September 2004

Bobruichanka Bobruisk (Belarus)	4–0	(Slovenia) KRKA Novo Mesto
Novikova 6'; Volkava 12' (pen.); Kazeeva 25'; Lutskevich 67'	Report

FK Rudar Stadium, Aleksinački Rudnik

=== Group B2 ===
Matches were played in Stockholm, Sweden.

Pos	Team	Pld	W	D	L	GF	GA	GD	Pts	Qualification	ARS	DJU	NES	AEG
1	(England) Arsenal	3	2	1	0	10	3	+7	7	Advance to quarter-finals	—	1–0	2–2	–
2	(Sweden) Djurgården (H)	3	2	0	1	8	3	+5	6	Advance to quarter-finals	–	—	3–2	5–0
3	(Spain) Athletic Club Neskak	3	1	1	1	9	6	+3	4		–	–	—	5–1
4	(Greece) Aegina	3	0	0	3	2	17	−15	0		1–7	–	–	—

Source: RSSSF
(H) Hosts
14 September 2004

Arsenal (England)	2–2	(Spain) Athletic Club Neskak
White 40'; Grant 87' (pen.)	Report	Vázquez 4'; Iturregi 56'

Stockholm Arena, Stockholm
14 September 2004

Djurgården (Sweden)	5–0	(Greece) Aegina
Callebaut 26'; James 51', 65'; Bengtsson 58'; Brisimi 61' (o.g.)	Report

Stockholm Arena, Stockholm

16 September 2004

Aegina (Greece)	1–7	(England) Arsenal
Tefani 44'	Report	Ludlow 8'; Fleeting 40', 75'; White 57'; Grant 66'; Wheatley 69'; Banks 82'

Stockholm Arena, Stockholm
16 September 2004

Djurgården (Sweden)	3–2	(Spain) Athletic Club Neskak
V. Svensson 40', 45+1'; Bengtsson 82'	Report	Ferreira 11'; Olabarrieta 20'

Stockholm Arena, Stockholm

18 September 2004

Arsenal (England)	1–0	(Sweden) Djurgården
Kemp 8'	Report

Stockholm Arena, Stockholm
18 September 2004

Athletic Club Neskak (Spain)	5–1	(Greece) Aegina
Murua 21'; Ibarra 41'; Vázquez 54', 90+1'; Fernández 71'	Report	Stojiljkovic 90+1'

Älvsjö IP, Älvsjö

=== Group B3 ===
Matches were played in Potsdam, Germany.

Pos	Team	Pld	W	D	L	GF	GA	GD	Pts	Qualification	TPO	TOR	WRO	MON
1	(Germany) Turbine Potsdam (H)	3	3	0	0	17	6	+11	9	Advance to quarter-finals	—	–	4–1	6–0
2	(Italy) Torres	3	2	0	1	12	8	+4	6	Advance to quarter-finals	5–7	—	5–0	–
3	(Poland) AZS Wrocław	3	1	0	2	3	9	−6	3		–	–	—	2–0
4	(France) Montpellier	3	0	0	3	1	10	−9	0		–	1–2	–	—

Source: RSSSF
(H) Hosts
14 September 2004

Torres (Italy)	5–0	(Poland) AZS Wrocław
Gazzoli 21', 76'; Pedersen 25', 74'; Tona 67'	Report

Karl-Liebknecht-Stadion, Potsdam
14 September 2004

Turbine Potsdam (Germany)	6–0	(France) Montpellier
Pohlers 6', 8' (pen.), 64'; Odebrecht 13'; Omilade 46'; Mittag 70'	Report

Karl-Liebknecht-Stadion, Potsdam

16 September 2004

Montpellier (France)	1–2	(Italy) Torres
Ramos 16'	Report	Conti 51'; Gazzoli 81'

Karl-Liebknecht-Stadion, Potsdam
16 September 2004

Turbine Potsdam (Germany)	4–1	(Poland) AZS Wrocław
Odebrecht 27'; Pohlers 29', 90+1'; Zietz 54'	Report	Otrębska 90+2'

Karl-Liebknecht-Stadion, Potsdam

18 September 2004

Torres (Italy)	5–7	(Germany) Turbine Potsdam
Pedersen 8', 30'; Gazzoli 12'; Pintus 41'; Guarino 49'	Report	Wimbersky 24', 89'; Omilade 26'; Hingst 38'; Pohlers 45', 45+2' (pen.), 67'

Karl-Liebknecht-Stadion, Potsdam
18 September 2004

AZS Wrocław (Poland)	2–0	(France) Montpellier
Nazarczyk 33'; Otrębska 53'	Report

Karl-Liebknecht-Stadion, Potsdam

=== Group B4 ===
Matches were played in København, Denmark.

Pos	Team	Pld	W	D	L	GF	GA	GD	Pts	Qualification	ØRN	EVO	BRØ	ALM
1	(Norway) Trondheims-Ørn	3	2	1	0	6	1	+5	7	Advance to quarter-finals	—	1–1	–	3–0
2	(Russia) Energy Voronezh	3	1	2	0	6	3	+3	5	Advance to quarter-finals	–	—	–	4–1
3	(Denmark) Brøndby (H)	3	1	1	1	3	3	0	4		0–2	1–1	—	–
4	(Kazakhstan) Alma	3	0	0	3	1	9	−8	0		–	–	0–2	—

Source: RSSSF
(H) Hosts
14 September 2004

Trondheims-Ørn (Norway)	3–0	(Kazakhstan) Alma
Mørkved 38'; Gulbrandsen 85'; Pedersen 87'	Report

Brøndby Idrætsanlæg, Brøndbyvester
14 September 2004

Brøndby (Denmark)	1–1	(Russia) Energy Voronezh
Paaske Sørensen 29'	Report	Zinchenko 89'

Brøndby Idrætsanlæg, Brøndbyvester

16 September 2004

Trondheims-Ørn (Norway)	1–1	(Russia) Energy Voronezh
Sandaune 7'	Report	Bosikova 32'

Brøndby Idrætsanlæg, Brøndbyvester
16 September 2004

Alma (Kazakhstan)	0–2	(Denmark) Brøndby
	Report	Munch 5'; Mi. Olsen 59'

Brøndby Idrætsanlæg, Brøndbyvester

18 September 2004

Brøndby (Denmark)	0–2	(Norway) Trondheims-Ørn
	Report	Gulbrandsen 29' (pen.); Engen 81'

Brøndby Stadium, Brøndbyvester
18 September 2004

Energy Voronezh (Russia)	4–1	(Kazakhstan) Alma
Rastetter 21', 77', 86'; Krasyukova 45' (o.g.)	Report	Yalova 8'

Brøndby Idrætsanlæg, Brøndbyvester
