= 2004–05 Arsenal L.F.C. season =

English women's football club season

Arsenal Ladies
2004–05 season
- Chairman: Peter Hill-Wood
- Manager: Vic Akers
- Stadium: Meadow Park
- Premier League: Champions
- FA Cup: Semi finals
- Premier League Cup: Winners
- UEFA Cup: Semi finals
- Community Shield: Runners up
- London County Cup: Semi finals
- Top goalscorer: League: Angela Banks (13); All: Julie Fleeting (23)
- Biggest win: 10–1 (vs Addeyans (A), London County Cup, 16 January 2005)
- Biggest defeat: 0–3 (vs Everton (A), FA Cup, 20 March 2005)
Home colours	Away colours	Third colours

The 2004–05 season was Arsenal Ladies Football Club's 18th season since forming in 1987. The club participated in the National Division of the FA Women's Premier League, winning the title for a 2nd consecutive season. They won the Premier League Cup, defeating Charlton Athletic 3–0 in the final to complete a domestic double. However, they were unable to retain the FA Cup, losing 3–0 in the Semi Finals to Everton. They missed out on the FA Community Shield and failed to progress in the London County Cup, after Charlton Athletic defeated them in both competitions. This season also saw Arsenal return to Europe after missing out the previous season. They reached the semifinals of the UEFA Women's Cup, where they were defeated 2–1 on aggregate by Djurgården.

== Squad information & statistics ==
=== First team squad ===
Squad statistics correct as of May 2005

Squad No.	Name	Date of Birth (Age)	Since	Signed From
Goalkeepers
1	(Republic of Ireland) Emma Byrne	14 June 1979 (aged 26)	2000	(Denmark) Fortuna Hjørring
13	(Scotland) Caroline Collie	11 August 1986 (aged 18)	2002	(England) Arsenal Academy
24	(England) Jasmine Cripps	4 November 1985 (aged 19)	1998	(England) Arsenal Academy
	(Wales) Lauren Wells	3 July 1988 (aged 16)	2004	(England) Arsenal Academy
Defenders
2	(England) Kirsty Pealling	14 April 1975 (aged 30)	1987	(England) Arsenal Academy
3	(Republic of Ireland) Yvonne Tracy	27 February 1981 (aged 24)	2000	(Republic of Ireland) St Patrick's Athletic
5	(England) Leanne Champ	10 August 1983 (aged 21)	2001	(England) Millwall Lionesses
6	(England) Faye White (c)	2 February 1978 (aged 27)	1996	(England) Three Bridges
11	(England) Clare Wheatley	4 February 1971 (aged 34)	1995	(England) Chelsea
17	(England) Hayley Kemp	23 June 1987 (aged 18)	1998	(England) Arsenal Academy
18	(England) Anita Asante	27 April 1985 (aged 20)	1998	(England) Arsenal Academy
20	Kelly Lawrence	2 July 1988 (aged 16)	2004	(England) Arsenal Academy
23	(England) Mary Phillip	14 March 1977 (aged 28)	2004	(England) Fulham
	(Northern Ireland) Ashley Hutton	2 November 1987 (aged 17)	2004	(England) Arsenal Academy
	(England) Cori Daniels	4 June 1986 (aged 19)	2002	(England) Charlton Athletic
	Yuki Tozaki		2004	
Midfielders
4	(Wales) Jayne Ludlow	7 January 1979 (aged 26)	2000	(England) Southampton Saints
7	(Republic of Ireland) Ciara Grant	17 May 1978 (aged 27)	1998	(Republic of Ireland) St Patrick's Athletic
12	(Republic of Ireland) Elaine O'Connor	20 February 1982 (aged 23)	2004	(United States) Long Island Lady Riders
12	(England) Kelly Smith	29 October 1978 (aged 26)	2005	(United States) New Jersey Wildcats
15	(Scotland) Kirsty McBride	9 September 1985 (aged 19)	2004	(Scotland) Hibernian
16	(England) Emma Thomas	17 October 1983 (aged 21)	1996	(England) Arsenal Academy
21	(England) Lisa Burrows	1 August 1985 (aged 19)	2002	(England) Arsenal Academy
	(England) Sian Larkin	10 August 1988 (aged 16)	2003	(England) Arsenal Academy
	(England) Charlotte Gurr	16 August 1989 (aged 15)	2004	(England) Arsenal Academy
	(England) Danielle Saulter		2004	(England) Arsenal Academy
	(England) Kylie Wren		2004	(England) Arsenal Academy
Forwards
8	(England) Angela Banks	23 December 1975 (aged 29)	2004	Retirement
9	(England) Lianne Sanderson	3 February 1988 (aged 17)	2003	(England) Arsenal Academy
10	(Scotland) Julie Fleeting	18 December 1980 (aged 24)	2004	(Scotland) Ross County
14	(England) Justine Lorton	11 March 1974 (aged 31)	2003	(England) Charlton Athletic
19	(New Zealand) Amber Hearn	28 November 1984 (aged 20)	2004	(England) Arsenal Academy
22	(England) Dunia Susi	10 August 1987 (aged 17)	2004	(England) Arsenal Academy
25	(England) Gemma Davison	17 April 1987 (aged 18)	2004	(England) Arsenal Academy
26	(England) Mikaela Howell	12 July 1988 (aged 16)	1999	(England) Southampton Women
Unknown
	Vikki Keeping		2004	(England) Arsenal Academy
	Lucy Tape		2004	(England) Arsenal Academy

=== Appearances and goals ===
No.	Name	PLND		FA Cup		PL Cup		LC Cup		Comm Shield		UEFA Cup		Total	
No.	Name	Apps	Goals	Apps	Goals	Apps	Goals	Apps	Goals	Apps	Goals	Apps	Goals	Apps	Goals
Goalkeepers
1	(Republic of Ireland) Emma Byrne	18	0	4	0	4	0	1	0	1	0	7	0	35	0
13	(Scotland) Caroline Collie	0	0	0	0	0	0	0	0	0	0	0	0	0	0
24	(England) Jasmine Cripps	0	0	0	0	0	0	0	0	0	0	0	0	0	0
	(Wales) Lauren Wells	0	0	0	0	0	0	0	0	0	0	0	0	0	0
Defenders
2	(England) Kirsty Pealling	17	1	3+1	0	4	0	1	0	1	0	7	0	33+1	1
3	(Republic of Ireland) Yvonne Tracy	3+3	0	1	0	0+2	0	1	0	0	0	0+1	0	5+6	0
5	(England) Leanne Champ	14+2	0	4	0	2+2	0	0	0	1	0	4+1	0	25+5	0
6	(England) Faye White (c)	8+1	3	4	1	3	2	0	0	0	0	5+1	2	20+2	8
11	(England) Clare Wheatley	16+2	0	3	0	4	0	1	0	1	0	7	1	32+1	1
17	(England) Hayley Kemp	2+2	0	0	0	1	0	0	0	1	0	2+1	1	6+3	1
18	(England) Anita Asante	14	1	1+2	0	2+1	0	1	0	0	0	7	0	25+3	1
20	Kelly Lawrence	0	0	0	0	0+1	0	0	0	0	0	0	0	0+1	0
23	(England) Mary Phillip	17	0	3+1	0	4	0	1	0	1	0	7	0	33+1	0
	(Northern Ireland) Ashley Hutton	0	0	0	0	0	0	0	0	0	0	0	0	0	0
	(England) Cori Daniels	0	0	0	0	0	0	0+1	0	0	0	0	0	0+1	0
	Yuki Tozaki	0	0	0	0	0	0	0+1	0	0	0	0	0	0+1	0
Midfielders
4	(Wales) Jayne Ludlow	15+3	5	4	2	4	1	1	1	1	0	7	2	32+3	11
7	(Republic of Ireland) Ciara Grant	16+2	5	4	0	4	2	1	1	1	0	7	2	33+2	10
12	(Republic of Ireland) Elaine O'Connor	1+4	0	0	0	0	0	0	0	1	0	0	0	2+4	0
12	(England) Kelly Smith	2+1	2	0+1	0	0	0	0	0	0	0	0	0	2+2	2
15	(Scotland) Kirsty McBride	3+5	0	1	0	0+3	0	0	0	0	0	0	0	4+8	0
16	(England) Emma Thomas	0	0	0	0	0	0	0+1	0	0	0	0	0	0+1	0
21	(England) Lisa Burrows	0+1	0	0	0	0	0	1	0	0	0	0	0	1+1	0
	(England) Sian Larkin	0	0	0	0	0	0	0	0	0	0	0	0	0	0
	(England) Charlotte Gurr	0	0	0	0	0	0	0	0	0	0	0	0	0	0
	Danielle Saulter	0	0	0	0	0	0	0	0	0	0	0	0	0	0
	Kylie Wren	0	0	0	0	0	0	0	0	0	0	0	0	0	0
Forwards
8	(England) Angela Banks	14+2	13	4	0	4	0	1	4	0	0	6+1	3	29+3	20
9	(England) Lianne Sanderson	18	9	4	1	4	3	1	1	1	0	4+3	0	32+3	14
10	(Scotland) Julie Fleeting	14	12	3	3	4	5	0	0	1	0	6+1	3	28+1	23
14	(England) Justine Lorton	5+6	4	1	0	0+1	0	2	4	0+1	0	1+2	0	9+10	8
19	(New Zealand) Amber Hearn	1+6	0	0+1	0	0+1	0	0	0	0	0	0+4	0	1+12	0
22	(England) Dunia Susi	0	0	0+1	0	0	0	0	0	0+1	0	0+1	0	0+3	0
25	(England) Gemma Davison	0+2	0	0	0	0	0	1	1	0+1	0	0+1	0	1+4	1
26	(England) Mikaela Howell	0	0	0	0	0	0	0	0	0	0	0	0	0	0
Unknown
	Vikki Keeping	0	0	0	0	0	0	0	0	0	0	0	0	0	0
	Lucy Tape	0	0	0	0	0	0	0	0	0	0	0	0	0	0

=== Goalscorers ===
Rank	No.	Position	Name	Premier League	FA Cup	PL Cup	LC Cup	Comm Shield	UEFA Cup	Total
1	10	FW	(Scotland) Julie Fleeting	12	3	5	0	0	3	23
2	8	FW	(England) Angela Banks	13	0	0	4	0	3	20
3	9	FW	(England) Lianne Sanderson	9	1	3	1	0	0	14
4	4	MF	(Wales) Jayne Ludlow	5	2	1	1	0	2	11
5	7	MF	(Republic of Ireland) Ciara Grant	5	0	2	1	0	2	10
6	6	DF	(England) Faye White (c)	3	1	2	0	0	2	8
6	14	FW	(England) Justine Lorton	4	0	0	4	0	0	8
8	12	MF	(England) Kelly Smith	2	0	0	0	0	0	2
9	2	DF	(England) Kirsty Pealling	1	0	0	0	0	0	1
9	18	DF	(England) Anita Asante	1	0	0	0	0	0	1
9	17	DF	(England) Hayley Kemp	0	0	0	0	0	1	1
9	25	FW	(England) Gemma Davison	0	0	0	1	0	0	1
9	11	DF	(England) Clare Wheatley	0	0	0	0	0	1	1
Own goal				1	1	0	0	0	0	2
Total				56	8	13	12	0	14	103

=== Clean sheets ===
Rank	No.	Name	PLND	FA Cup	PL Cup	LC Cup	Comm Shield	UEFA Cup	Total
1	1	(Republic of Ireland) Emma Byrne	9	2	3	0	0	1	15
Total			9	2	3	0	0	1	15

== Transfers, loans and other signings ==
=== Transfers in ===
Announcement date	No.	Position	Player	From club
2004	12	MF	(Republic of Ireland) Elaine O'Connor	(United States) Long Island Lady Riders
October 2004		MF	(Scotland) Kirsty McBride	(Scotland) Hibernian
12 July 2004	23	DF	(England) Mary Phillip	(England) Fulham
30 July 2004	8	FW	(England) Angela Banks	Retirement
4 January 2005	12	MF	(England) Kelly Smith	(United States) New Jersey Wildcats

=== Transfers out ===
Announcement date	No.	Position	Player	To club
2004	24	DF	(England) Georgie Adams	(England) Birmingham City
2004	23	MF	(Wales) Eleri Earnshaw	(United States) New York Magic
2004	30	DF	(England) Carol Harwood	Retired
2004	19	FW	(Japan) Mihoko Ishida	(Japan) JEF United Chiba
2004	22	MF	(England) Jo Potter	(England) Birmingham City
2004	9	FW	(England) Alex Scott	(England) Birmingham City
2004	7	MF	(England) Sian Williams	(England) Charlton Athletic
2004		MF	(South Africa) Portia Modise	(South Africa) Sowedo
2004		MF	(South Africa) Veronica Phewa	
2004		MF	(South Africa) Toni Carelse	
July 2004		MF	(England) Leanne Small	(England) Chelsea
5 August 2004	10	FW	(England) Ellen Maggs	(England) Birmingham City
November 2004		GK	(Scotland) Caroline Collie	(England) Chelsea
2005	12	MF	(Republic of Ireland) Elaine O'Connor	(United States) Long Island Lady Riders

== Club ==
=== Kit ===
Supplier: Nike / Sponsor: O2.

Home	Away	Third

== Pre-season ==
29 July 2004	Arsenal	8–0	Enfield Town	Hatfield
18:00 BST	Grant; Lorton; Sanderson; Susi; Williams; Davidson	Report		Stadium: Queenswood School

1 August 2004	AFC Wimbledon	1–11	Arsenal	Hatfield
14:00 BST	Goal	Report	Ludlow; Lorton; Wheatley; Grant; Sanderson; Ray; O'Connor	Stadium: Queenswood School

== Competitions ==
=== Overall record ===
Competition	First match	Last match	Starting round	Final position	Record							
Competition	First match	Last match	Starting round	Final position	Pld	W	D	L	GF	GA	GD	Win %
FA Women's Premier League National Division	22 August 2004	7 May 2005	Matchday 1	Winners	18	15	3	0	57	13	+44	83.33
FA Women's Cup	9 January 2005	20 March 2005	Fourth round	Semi-finals	4	3	0	1	8	1	+7	75.00
FA Women's Premier League Cup	5 September 2004	6 March 2005	First round	Winners	5	5	0	0	13	2	+11	100.00
UEFA Women's Cup	14 September 2004	15 April 2005	Second qualifying round	Semi-finals	7	3	2	2	15	8	+7	42.86
FA Women's Community Shield	11 August 2004		Final	Runners-up	1	0	0	1	0	1	−1	0.00
London County Cup	16 January 2005	1 March 2005	First round	Semi-finals	2	1	0	1	12	4	+8	50.00
Total					37	27	5	5	105	29	+76	72.97

Last updated: 24 May 2026
Source: FA WPL

=== FA Women's Community Shield ===
11 August 2004 Final	Arsenal	0–1	Charlton Athletic	Stevenage
	Ludlow (yellow card) 59'	Report	Heatherson 41'; Pond (yellow card) 87'	Stadium: Broadhall Way; Attendance: 1,487; Referee: Mr S J Long

=== FA Women's Premier League National Division ===
==== Partial league table ====
Pos	Team	Pld	W	D	L	GF	GA	GD	Pts	Qualification or relegation
1	Arsenal (C)	18	15	3	0	57	13	+44	48	Qualification for the UEFA Cup qualifying round
2	Charlton Athletic	18	13	2	3	43	17	+26	41	
3	Everton	18	11	4	3	45	24	+21	37	
4	Birmingham City	18	9	3	6	37	28	+9	30	
5	Bristol Rovers	18	9	1	8	35	28	+7	28	

Source: FA WPL
(C) Champions

==== Results summary ====
Overall								Home						Away					
Pld	W	D	L	GF	GA	GD	Pts	W	D	L	GF	GA	GD	W	D	L	GF	GA	GD
18	15	3	0	57	13	+44	48	8	1	0	35	6	+29	7	2	0	22	7	+15

==== Results by matchday ====
Matchday	1	2	3	4	5	6	7	8	9	10	11	12	13	14	15	16	17	18
Ground	H	A	A	H	A	H	H	A	H	H	H	A	A	H	A	A	A	H
Result	D	D	W	W	W	W	W	W	W	W	W	D	W	W	W	W	W	W
Position	5	6	4	5	5	4	5	4	3	2	3	3	2	2	1	1	1	1

Source: FA WPL
W = Win; D = Draw; L = Loss

==== Matches ====
22 August 2004 1	Arsenal	2–2	Charlton Athletic	Borehamwood
12:00 BST	Sanderson 1'; Ludlow (yellow card) 18'; Champ (yellow card) 31' (yellow-red card) 63'; Banks 74'	Report	Aluko 27', 60'; Murphy (yellow card)	Stadium: Meadow Park; Referee: Roy Pitters

29 August 2004 2	Fulham	0–0	Arsenal	Motspur Park
15:00 BST		Report		Stadium: Motspur Park; Referee: Len Wilcox

5 September 2004 3	Liverpool	0–4	Arsenal	Wallasey
14:30 BST		Report	Lorton 15', 18'; Grant 32'; Ludlow 65'	Stadium: Victoria Park

3 October 2004 4	Arsenal	4–1	Liverpool	Borehamwood
14:00 BST	Banks 54'; Sanderson 65'; Ludlow 81', 87'	Report	Hart 61'	Stadium: Meadow Park

13 October 2004 5	Birmingham City	2–5	Arsenal	Redditch
19:45 BST	Lacey 66'; Gallagher 90+4'	Report	Banks 7', 11', 12'; Sanderson 30'; Pealling 70'	Stadium: Valley Stadium

17 October 2004 6	Arsenal	1–0	Leeds United	Borehamwood
14:00 BST	Lorton 53'	Report		Stadium: Meadow Park; Referee: Mr C Henry

14 November 2004 7	Arsenal	2–0	Everton	Borehamwood
14:00 GMT	Grant 65' (pen.); Fleeting 78'	Report		Stadium: Meadow Park

21 November 2004 8	Bristol City	2–3	Arsenal	Almondsbury
14:00 GMT	McArthur 19'; Tomkins 65'	Report	Sanderson 11', 85'; Banks 62'	Stadium: Oaklands Park

28 November 2004 9	Arsenal	2–0	Bristol Rovers	Borehamwood
14:00 GMT	Fleeting 50'; Grant 85'	Report		Stadium: Meadow Park

5 December 2004 10	Arsenal	3–0	Doncaster Rovers Belles	Borehamwood
14:00 GMT	Fleeting 44', 78', 82'	Report		Stadium: Meadow Park

23 January 2005 11	Arsenal	7–0	Bristol City	Borehamwood
14:00 GMT	Bryant 8' (o.g.); Smith 36'; White 43', 81'; Fleeting 79'; Lorton 85'; Sanderson 90'	Report		Stadium: Meadow Park

6 February 2005 12	Everton	1–1	Arsenal	Crosby
14:00 GMT	Handley 33'	Report	Ludlow 72'	Stadium: Rossett Park

27 February 2005 13	Doncaster Rovers Belles	0–1	Arsenal	Doncaster
14:00 GMT		Report	Fleeting 52'	Stadium: Belle Vue

23 March 2005 14	Arsenal	8–1	Birmingham City	Borehamwood
19:30 GMT	Fleeting 15', 90'; Grant 51', 79'; Banks 56', 66'; Sanderson 61'; Asante 85'	Report	Maggs 24'; Carney (red card) 60'	Stadium: Meadow Park; Referee: William Savill

27 March 2005 15	Leeds United	1–2	Arsenal	Garforth
14:00 GMT	Ward 81'	Report	Ludlow 60'; White 86'	Stadium: Wheatley Park

3 April 2005 16	Bristol Rovers	1–5	Arsenal	Mangotsfield
14:00 BST	Williams 24'	Report	Sanderson; Wheatley; Banks	Stadium: Cossham Street

24 April 2005 17	Charlton Athletic	0–1	Arsenal	Northfleet
14:00 BST	J. Smith (yellow card)	Report	K. Smith 64'	Stadium: Stonebridge Road

7 May 2005 18	Arsenal	6–2	Fulham	Finchley
15:00 BST	Fleeting; Ludlow; Sanderson; Banks	Report	Ritchie 65'; Anderson 87'	Stadium: The Maurice Rebak Stadium

=== FA Women's Cup ===
9 January 2005 Fourth round	Arsenal	2–0	AFC Wimbledon	Borehamwood
13:00 GMT	Ludlow 67', 72'	Report		Stadium: Meadow Park; Attendance: 110

30 January 2005 Fifth round	Leeds United	1–3	Arsenal	Garforth
13:00 GMT	Ward 70'	Report	Fleeting 30'; White 43'; Sanderson 88'	Stadium: Wheatley Park

20 February 2005 Quarter-finals	Birmingham City	0–3	Arsenal	Solihull
14:00 GMT		Report	Fleeting 23', 80'; Lacey 39' (o.g.)	Stadium: Damson Park

20 March 2005 Semi-finals	Everton	3–0	Arsenal	Southport
	Williams 44'; Handley 79'; McDougall 85' (pen.)	Report		Stadium: Haig Avenue; Referee: Douglas Stewart

=== FA Women's Premier League Cup ===
5 September 2004 First round	Arsenal	w/o	Sunderland	Borehamwood
14:00 BST		Report		Stadium: Meadow Park
Note: Given as a home walkover after Sunderland withdrew from the competition

10 October 2004 Second round	Arsenal	4–1	Bristol City	Borehamwood
14:00 BST	Sanderson 7', 80'; Grant 15'; Fleeting 90'	Report	Bryant 30'	Stadium: Meadow Park

7 November 2004 Quarter-finals	Arsenal	3–0	Fulham	Borehamwood
14:00 GMT	Grant 18' (penalty missed) 44; Ludlow 72'; Sanderson 90'	Report		Stadium: Meadow Park

12 December 2004 Semi-finals	Birmingham City	1–3	Arsenal	Solihull
14:00 GMT	Barr 52'	Report	Fleeting 16', 78', 89'	Stadium: Damson Park

6 March 2005 Final	Charlton Athletic	0–3	Arsenal	Brentford
12:15 GMT	Chapman (yellow card) 78'	Report	Fleeting 24'; White 48', 69'	Stadium: Griffin Park; Attendance: 2,512; Referee: C Henry

=== London County Cup ===
16 January 2005 First Round	Addeyans	1–10	Arsenal
14:00 GMT	55' (pen.)	Report	Banks; Lorton; Ludlow; Davison; Grant

1 March 2005 Semi-finals	Charlton Athletic	3–2 (a.e.t.)	Arsenal	Northfleet
	Clarke 10', 70'; Heatherson 95'	Report	Sanderson; Lorton 80'	Stadium: Stonebridge Road

=== UEFA Women's Cup ===
==== Second qualifying round ====
Pos	Team	Pld	W	D	L	GF	GA	GD	Pts	Qualification	ARS	DJU	NES	AEG
1	(England) Arsenal	3	2	1	0	10	3	+7	7	Advance to quarter-finals	—	1–0	2–2	–
2	(Sweden) Djurgården (H)	3	2	0	1	8	3	+5	6	Advance to quarter-finals	–	—	3–2	5–0
3	(Spain) Athletic Club Neskak	3	1	1	1	9	6	+3	4		–	–	—	5–1
4	(Greece) Aegina	3	0	0	3	2	17	−15	0		1–7	–	–	—

Source: RSSSF
(H) Hosts

14 September 2004 1	Arsenal (England)	2–2	(Spain) Athletic Club	Stockholm
15:00 BST	White 40' (yellow card) 58'; Grant 87' (pen.)	Report	Vázquez 4' (yellow card) 73'; Iturregi 56'; Moreno (yellow card) 86'	Stadium: Stockholm Olympic Stadium

16 September 2004 2	Aegina (Greece)	1–7	(England) Arsenal	Stockholm
15:00 BST	Koutrafouri (yellow card) 41'; Tefani 44'; Zouzouli (yellow card) 47'; Bentoumi (yellow card) 61'	Report	Ludlow 8'; White (yellow card) 21' (goal) 57'; Champ (red card) 29'; Fleeting 40', 75'; Grant 66'; Wheatley 69'; Banks 82'	Stadium: Stockholm Olympic Stadium

18 September 2004 3	Arsenal (England)	1–0	(Sweden) Djurgården	Stockholm
13:00 BST	Kemp 8' (yellow card) 72'	Report	Nykvist (yellow card) (yellow-red card) 81'; Fagerström (yellow card) 84'	Stadium: Stockholm Olympic Stadium

==== Knockout phase ====
===== Quarter-finals =====
23 October 2004 First leg	Torres (Italy)	2–0	(England) Arsenal	Sassari
13:00 BST	Conti 19'; Guarino 78'	Report		Stadium: Vanni Sanna

31 October 2004 Second leg	Arsenal (England)	4–1 (4–3 agg.)	(Italy) Torres	Borehamwood
13:00 BST	Banks 36', 38'; White (yellow card) 57'; Ludlow 72'; Fleeting 82'	Report	Pedersen 68'; Placchi (yellow card) 79'	Stadium: Meadow Park

===== Semi-finals =====
7 April 2005 First leg	Djurgården (Sweden)	1–1	(England) Arsenal	Solna
17:00 BST	Ekblom 39'	Report	Fleeting 23'	Stadium: Råsunda

15 April 2005 Second leg	Arsenal (England)	0–1 (1–2 agg.)	(Sweden) Djurgården	Borehamwood
19:45 BST	Champ (red card) 80'	Report	Svensson 41'	Stadium: Meadow Park; Attendance: 1,808

== See also ==
- List of Arsenal W.F.C. seasons
- 2004–05 in English football
