= 2004 in Norwegian football =

Football in Norway
- Season: 2004

Men's football
- Tippeligaen: Rosenborg
- 1. divisjon: Start
- 2. divisjon: Tønsberg (Group 1); Follo (Group 2); Løv-Ham (Group 3); Alta (Group 4)
- Cupen: Brann

Women's football
- Toppserien: Røa
- 1. divisjon: Kattem
- Cupen: Røa

The 2004 season was the 99th season of competitive football in Norway.

== Men's football ==
=== League season ===
==== Tippeligaen ====
Pos	Team	Pld	W	D	L	GF	GA	GD	Pts	Qualification or relegation
1	Rosenborg (C)	26	14	6	6	52	34	+18	48	Qualification for the Champions League third qualifying round
2	Vålerenga	26	13	9	4	40	22	+18	48	Qualification for the Champions League second qualifying round
3	Brann	26	12	4	10	46	40	+6	40	Qualification for the UEFA Cup second qualifying round (Note: Brann qualified for the UEFA Cup second qualifying round as Norwegian Cup winners. Their spot in the UEFA Cup as third-place finishers was passed down to Tromsø, the first team in the table not already qualified for any European competition.)
4	Tromsø	26	12	4	10	38	32	+6	40	Qualification for the UEFA Cup second qualifying round
5	Ham-Kam	26	10	8	8	34	33	+1	38	
6	Lyn	26	9	10	7	30	31	−1	37	
7	Lillestrøm	26	8	11	7	45	33	+12	35	
8	Odd Grenland	26	9	8	9	47	44	+3	35	
9	Viking	26	7	12	7	31	33	−2	33	Qualification for the UEFA Cup first qualifying round (Note: Viking qualified for the UEFA Cup first qualifying round through the UEFA Fair Play ranking award.)
10	Fredrikstad	26	9	5	12	42	54	−12	32	
11	Molde	26	7	10	9	34	37	−3	31	
12	Bodø/Glimt (O)	26	7	6	13	28	41	−13	27	Qualification for the relegation play-offs
13	Stabæk (R)	26	7	6	13	25	40	−15	27	Relegation to First Division
14	Sogndal (R)	26	5	7	14	39	57	−18	22	Relegation to First Division

Source: fotball.no
Rules for classification: 1) points; 2) goal difference; 3) number of goals scored.
(C) Champions; (O) Play-off winners; (R) Relegated

==== 1. divisjon ====
Pos	Team	Pld	W	D	L	GF	GA	GD	Pts	Promotion or relegation
1	Start (C, P)	30	24	2	4	71	28	+43	74	Promotion to Tippeligaen
2	Aalesund (P)	30	21	1	8	67	36	+31	64	Promotion to Tippeligaen
3	Kongsvinger	30	16	5	9	53	42	+11	53	Qualification for the promotion play-offs
4	Sandefjord	30	15	6	9	60	32	+28	51	
5	Mandalskameratene	30	13	6	11	51	55	−4	45	
6	Hødd	30	14	2	14	63	59	+4	44	
7	Bryne	30	11	9	10	54	45	+9	42	
8	Skeid	30	12	6	12	57	56	+1	42	
9	Strømsgodset	30	11	7	12	42	45	−3	40	
10	Moss	30	11	5	14	48	47	+1	38	
11	Pors Grenland (Note: Pors Grenland was deducted 2 points for using ineligible players.)	30	11	7	12	56	60	−4	38	
12	Hønefoss BK	30	11	4	15	52	54	−2	37	
13	Raufoss (R)	30	10	7	13	42	47	−5	37	Relegation to Second Division
14	Haugesund (R)	30	11	4	15	44	59	−15	37	Relegation to Second Division
15	Vard Haugesund (R)	30	7	3	20	43	83	−40	24	Relegation to Second Division
16	Tromsdalen (R)	30	3	4	23	29	84	−55	13	Relegation to Second Division

Source: nifs.no
Rules for classification: 1) points; 2) goal difference; 3) number of goals scored.
(C) Champions; (P) Promoted; (R) Relegated

==== 2. divisjon ====
===== Group 1 =====
Pos	Team	Pld	W	D	L	GF	GA	GD	Pts	Promotion or relegation
1	FK Tønsberg (P)	26	20	2	4	70	21	+49	62	Promotion to First Division
2	Sarpsborg Sparta	26	16	4	6	63	38	+25	52	
3	Tollnes	26	16	2	8	68	42	+26	50	
4	Kvik Halden	26	12	8	6	70	40	+30	44	
5	Stabæk 2 (Note: Stabæk 2 was forcibly relegated because its A team was relegated to the First Division.) (R)	26	12	2	12	54	59	−5	38	Relegation to Third Division
6	Ørn-Horten	26	11	4	11	52	65	−13	37	
7	Frigg	26	10	6	10	50	34	+16	36	
8	Larvik Fotball	26	10	5	11	31	37	−6	35	
9	Kjelsås	26	9	7	10	38	39	−1	34	
10	Odd Grenland 2	26	9	5	12	48	49	−1	32	
11	Sprint-Jeløy	26	8	5	13	52	68	−16	29	
12	Mercantile (Note: Mercantile survived as the best number-12-team.)	26	7	7	12	36	55	−19	28	
13	Arendal (R)	26	6	3	17	31	67	−36	21	Relegation to Third Division
14	Donn (R)	26	3	6	17	29	78	−49	15	Relegation to Third Division

(P) Promoted; (R) Relegated

===== Group 2 =====
Pos	Team	Pld	W	D	L	GF	GA	GD	Pts	Promotion or relegation
1	Follo (P)	26	16	6	4	57	22	+35	54	Promotion to First Division
2	Lørenskog	26	13	9	4	66	40	+26	48	
3	Lillestrøm 2	26	13	8	5	72	37	+35	47	
4	Ullensaker/Kisa	26	14	3	9	56	48	+8	45	
5	Gjøvik-Lyn	26	11	8	7	55	40	+15	41	
6	Nybergsund	26	10	9	7	43	35	+8	39	
7	Oslo Øst	26	10	4	12	45	48	−3	34	
8	Drøbak/Frogn	26	7	12	7	48	44	+4	33	
9	Jotun Årdalstangen	26	9	6	11	45	49	−4	33	
10	Eidsvold Turn	26	9	5	12	38	53	−15	32	
11	Molde 2	26	6	11	9	52	60	−8	29	
12	Nidelv (R)	26	7	6	13	45	71	−26	27	Relegation to Third Division
13	Elverum (R)	26	3	8	15	27	74	−47	17	Relegation to Third Division
14	Skjetten (R)	26	3	7	16	37	65	−28	16	Relegation to Third Division

(P) Promoted; (R) Relegated

===== Group 3 =====
Pos	Team	Pld	W	D	L	GF	GA	GD	Pts	Promotion or relegation
1	Løv-Ham (P)	26	22	3	1	86	27	+59	69	Promotion to First Division
2	Bærum	26	17	2	7	75	31	+44	53	
3	Åsane	26	13	3	10	52	37	+15	42	
4	Viking 2	26	12	4	10	43	37	+6	40	
5	Fyllingen	26	12	2	12	56	59	−3	38	
6	Fana	26	10	8	8	48	57	−9	38	
7	Klepp	26	10	6	10	43	49	−6	36	
8	Sandnes Ulf	26	10	4	12	38	47	−9	34	
9	Hovding	26	10	3	13	46	54	−8	33	
10	Ålgård	26	9	3	14	37	57	−20	30	
11	Brann 2	26	7	8	11	52	69	−17	29	
12	Vidar (R)	26	7	6	13	35	51	−16	27	Relegation to Third Division
13	Volda (R)	26	8	1	17	39	59	−20	25	Relegation to Third Division
14	Norheimsund (R)	26	6	5	15	34	50	−16	23	Relegation to Third Division

(P) Promoted; (R) Relegated

===== Group 4 =====
Pos	Team	Pld	W	D	L	GF	GA	GD	Pts	Promotion or relegation
1	Alta (P)	26	21	0	5	95	21	+74	63	Promotion to First Division
2	Levanger	26	17	6	3	89	34	+55	57	
3	Strindheim	26	18	3	5	98	45	+53	57	
4	Mo	26	15	5	6	51	30	+21	50	
5	Byåsen	26	12	4	10	48	45	+3	40	
6	Harstad	26	12	3	11	66	62	+4	39	
7	Skarp	26	11	3	12	44	40	+4	36	
8	Steinkjer	26	10	4	12	65	52	+13	34	
9	Kolstad	26	10	3	13	51	59	−8	33	
10	Lofoten	26	10	2	14	50	66	−16	32	
11	Rosenborg 2	26	9	3	14	44	61	−17	30	
12	Vesterålen (R)	26	5	5	16	32	74	−42	20	Relegation to Third Division
13	Salangen (R)	26	5	4	17	45	110	−65	19	Relegation to Third Division
14	Narvik (R)	26	2	5	19	27	106	−79	11	Relegation to Third Division

(P) Promoted; (R) Relegated

=== Norwegian Cup ===
==== Bracket ====
Quarter-finals
1	Lyn	3
1	Ham-Kam	1
1	Lillestrøm	3
1	Rosenborg	2
2	Sandefjord	3(3)
1	Stabæk (a.e.t.)	3(4)
1	Brann	3
2	Bryne	2

Semi-finals
1	Lyn	1
1	Lillestrøm	0
1	Stabæk	1(1)
1	Brann (a.e.t.)	1(3)

Final
1	Lyn	1
1	Brann	4

==== Final ====
7 November 2004
13:15 CET (UTC+1)

Brann	4–1	Lyn
Sæternes 4', 13', 34'; Winters 8'	Report	Markstedt 11'

Ullevaal Stadion, Oslo
Attendance: 24,458
Referee: Espen Berntsen (Vang)

== Women's football ==
=== League season ===
==== Toppserien ====
Pos	Team	Pld	W	D	L	GF	GA	GD	Pts	Qualification or relegation
1	Røa (C)	18	14	2	2	39	9	+30	44	Qualification for the UEFA Women's Cup first qualifying round
2	Trondheims-Ørn	18	13	4	1	46	18	+28	43	
3	Fløya	18	10	3	5	47	22	+25	33	
4	Asker	18	9	4	5	37	23	+14	31	
5	Kolbotn	18	9	1	8	51	34	+17	28	
6	Team Strømmen	18	7	2	9	36	39	−3	23	
7	Sandviken	18	4	6	8	23	44	−21	18	
8	Klepp	18	5	2	11	26	40	−14	17	
9	Arna-Bjørnar (R)	18	4	1	13	31	54	−23	13	Relegation to First Division
10	Medkila (R)	18	2	1	15	12	65	−53	7	Relegation to First Division

Source: NIFS
Rules for classification: 1) points; 2) goal difference; 3) number of goals scored.
(C) Champions; (R) Relegated

==== 1. divisjon ====
Pos	Team	Pld	W	D	L	GF	GA	GD	Pts	Promotion or relegation
1	Kattem (P)	18	15	2	1	62	20	+42	47	Promoted
2	Liungen (P)	18	13	2	3	78	29	+49	41	Promoted
3	Amazon Grimstad	18	11	3	4	47	25	+22	36	
4	Larvik	18	10	2	6	52	38	+14	32	
5	Fortuna	18	9	0	9	49	57	−8	27	
6	Bamble	18	8	0	10	42	60	−18	24	
7	Fart	18	7	1	10	34	46	−12	22	
8	Byåsen	18	5	1	12	47	70	−23	16	
9	Skeid (R)	18	4	0	14	29	69	−40	12	Relegated
10	Haugar (R)	18	0	5	13	24	50	−26	5	Relegated

(P) Promoted; (R) Relegated

=== Norwegian Women's Cup ===
==== Final ====
- Røa 2–1 Asker

== Men's UEFA competitions ==
Norwegian representatives:

- Rosenborg (UEFA Champions League)
- Bodø/Glimt (UEFA Cup, Norwegian Cup runners-up)
- Stabæk (UEFA Cup)
- Odd Grenland (UEFA Cup)

=== Champions League ===
==== Qualifying rounds ====
===== Second qualifying round =====
Team 1	Agg.	Team 2	1st leg	2nd leg
Rosenborg (Norway)	4–1	(Moldova) Sheriff Tiraspol	2–1	2–0

===== Third qualifying round =====
Team 1	Agg.	Team 2	1st leg	2nd leg
Rosenborg (Norway)	5–3	(Israel) Maccabi Haifa	2–1	3–2 (aet)

==== Group stage ====
===== Group E =====
Pos	Team	Pld	W	D	L	GF	GA	GD	Pts	Qualification	ARS	PSV	PAN	ROS
1	(England) Arsenal	6	2	4	0	11	6	+5	10	Advance to knockout stage	—	1–0	1–1	5–1
2	(Netherlands) PSV Eindhoven	6	3	1	2	6	7	−1	10	Advance to knockout stage	1–1	—	1–0	1–0
3	(Greece) Panathinaikos	6	2	3	1	11	8	+3	9	Transfer to UEFA Cup	2–2	4–1	—	2–1
4	(Norway) Rosenborg	6	0	2	4	6	13	−7	2		1–1	1–2	2–2	—

Matches

- September 14: Panathinaikos (Greece) – Rosenborg 2–1
- September 29: Rosenborg – Arsenal (England) 1–1
- October 20: Rosenborg – PSV Eindhoven (Netherlands) 1–2
- November 2: PSV Eindhoven – Rosenborg 1–0
- November 24: Rosenborg – Panathinaikos 2–2
- December 7: Arsenal – Rosenborg 5–1

=== UEFA Cup ===
==== Second qualifying round ====
Team 1	Agg.	Team 2	1st leg	2nd leg
Odd Grenland (Norway)	4–3	(Lithuania) Ekranas	3–1	1–2
Stabæk (Norway)	6–2	(Finland) Haka	3–1	3–1
Bodø/Glimt (Norway)	3–3 (8–7 p)	(Estonia) Levadia	2–1	1–2 (a.e.t.)

==== First round ====
Team 1	Agg.	Team 2	1st leg	2nd leg
Bodø/Glimt (Norway)	1–2	(Turkey) Beşiktaş	1–1	0–1
Odd Grenland (Norway)	1–5	(Netherlands) Feyenoord	0–1	1–4
Sochaux (France)	9–0	(Norway) Stabæk	4–0	5–0

=== Intertoto Cup ===
No Norwegian representative this season.

== UEFA Women's Cup ==
=== Norwegian Representatives ===
- Trondheims/Ørn (UEFA Cup)

=== Second qualifying round ===
==== Group 4 ====
Pos	Team	Pld	W	D	L	GF	GA	GD	Pts	Qualification	ØRN	EVO	BRØ	ALM
1	(Norway) Trondheims-Ørn	3	2	1	0	6	1	+5	7	Advance to quarter-finals	—	1–1	–	3–0
2	(Russia) Energy Voronezh	3	1	2	0	6	3	+3	5	Advance to quarter-finals	–	—	–	4–1
3	(Denmark) Brøndby (H)	3	1	1	1	3	3	0	4		0–2	1–1	—	–
4	(Kazakhstan) Alma	3	0	0	3	1	9	−8	0		–	–	0–2	—

Source: RSSSF
(H) Hosts

Matches

- In København, Denmark

September 14: Trondheims/Ørn – Alma KTZH (Kazakhstan) 3–0
September 16: Trondheims/Ørn – Energy Voronezh (Russia) 1–1
September 18: Brøndby (Denmark) – Trondheims/Ørn 0–2

=== Quarter-finals ===
Team 1	Agg.	Team 2	1st leg	2nd leg
Bobruichanka Bobruisk (Belarus)	1–6	(Norway) Trondheims-Ørn	0–4	1–2

=== Semi-finals ===
Team 1	Agg.	Team 2	1st leg	2nd leg
Turbine Potsdam (Germany)	7–1	(Norway) Trondheims-Ørn	4–0	3–1

== National team ==
=== Norway men's national football team ===
Date	Venue	Opponent	Res.*	Competition	Norwegian goalscorers
January 22	Hong Kong	Sweden	3–0	Friendly	Frode Johnsen, Håvard Flo (2)
January 25	Hong Kong	Honduras	3–1	Friendly	Harald Martin Brattbakk, Frode Johnsen, Magne Hoseth
January 28	Singapore	Singapore	5–2	Friendly	Anders Stadheim, Alexander Aas, Håvard Flo (2), Harald Martin Brattbakk
February 18	Belfast	Northern Ireland	4–1	Friendly	Morten Gamst Pedersen (2), Steffen Iversen, Own Goal
March 31	Beograd	Serbia and Montenegro	1–0	Friendly	Martin Andresen
April 28	Oslo	Russia	3–2	Friendly	Martin Andresen, Sigurd Rushfeldt, Jan Gunnar Solli
May 27	Oslo	Wales	0–0	Friendly
August 18	Oslo	Belgium	2–2	Friendly	Frode Johnsen, Vidar Riseth
September 4	Palermo	Italy	1–2	WCQ	John Carew
September 8	Oslo	Belarus	1–1	WCQ	Vidar Riseth
October 9	Glasgow	Scotland	1–0	WCQ	Steffen Iversen
October 13	Oslo	Slovenia	3–0	WCQ	John Carew, Morten Gamst Pedersen, Alexander Ødegaard
November 16	London	Australia	2–2	Friendly	Steffen Iversen, Morten Gamst Pedersen

Note: Norway's goals first
Explanation:

- WCQ = FIFA World Cup 2006 Qualifier

=== Norway women's national football team ===
March 7: Belgium – Norway 1–6 European Championship qualifier
March 14: Norway – Finland 4–1, friendly
March 16: Norway – Italy 3–0, friendly
March 18: Norway – China 0–0, friendly
March 20: Norway – United States 1–4, friendly
May 22: Netherlands – Norway 0–2, European Championship qualifier
May 27: Denmark – Norway 2–1, European Championship qualifier
July 21: Germany – Norway 0–1, friendly
July 24: Sweden – Norway 0–4, friendly
September 4: Norway – Italy 3–1, friendly
October 2: Norway – Spain 2–0, European Championship qualifier
November 10: Iceland – Norway 2–7, European Championship play-off
November 13: Norway – Iceland 2–1, European Championship play-off
