= Pierre Berthezène =

French soldier (1775–1847)

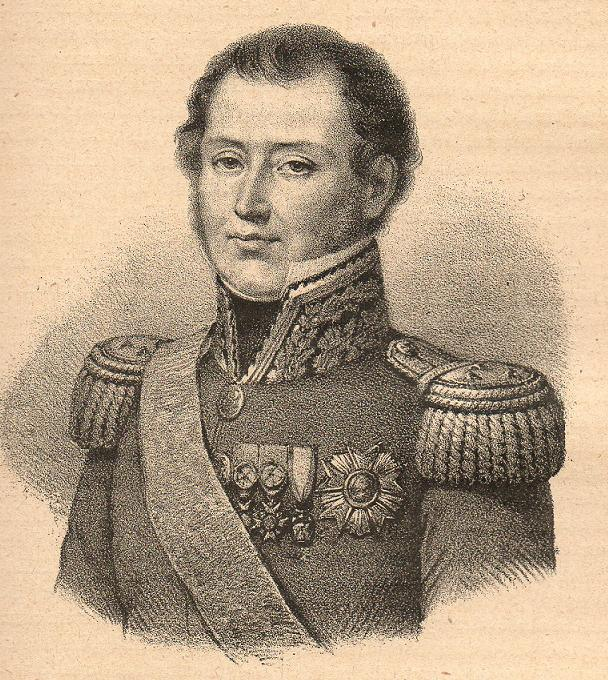
- Pierre Berthezène, Baron Berthezène
- Born: 24 March 1775; Vendargues, France
- Died: 9 October 1847 (aged 72) Vendargues, France
- Allegiance: French First Republic; First French Empire; Kingdom of France; French Second Republic
- Rank: Général de division
- Commands: 10th Light Infantry Regiment; 11th Infantry Division; 1st Infantry Division; Military Governor of Algeria
- Conflicts: Siege of Toulon; Battle of Castiglione; Marengo campaign; Battle of Heilsberg; Battle of Eckmühl; Battle of Essling; Russian Campaign; Battle of the Beresina; Battle of Lützen; Battle of Bautzen; Battle of Dresden; Battle of Ligny; Battle of Wavre; French invasion of Algeria

Pierre, baron Berthezène (French pronunciation: [pjɛʁ bɛʁtəzɛn]; 24 March 1775, Vendargues – 9 October 1847, Vendargues) was a general of France.

== Life ==
=== Early military career ===
Pierre's parents, Jacques Berthezène and Marguerite Causse, were from a modest background. They chose a career in the church for him and the village priest taught him in preparation for the seminary at Montpellier. Berthezène was still studying when the French Revolution broke out. On 15 September 1793 he joined the 5th volunteer battalion of Hérault, amalgamated into the 7th provisional battle demi-brigade, which later became the 10th line infantry regiment in year 4. He rose to corporal, sergeant and sergeant-major on 17, 19 and 22 September. In this regiment he met other non-commissioned officers such as Lannes and Victor.

=== Revolutionary wars ===
He joined the armée des Pyrénées orientales, but a few days after the affair at Peyrestortes, the brigade went to reinforce the corps besieging Toulon. At the capture of the British redoubt which was decisive in the French revolutionaries' capture of the city, the young Berthezène captured a British NCO's rifle, which he kept himself. This act of bravery gained him promotion to lieutenant on 1 Messidor, year II.

His demi-brigade then moved to Garnier's division in the armée d'Italie. In 1796 Berthezène, having been elected lieutenant, distinguished himself at Castiglione.

In 1798 he was attached to the staff of General Grenier under whom he distinguished himself and was promoted to captain. In 1799 he was made aide-de-camp to General Compans. In 1799 he was given command of a battalion in the 72nd demi-brigade, which he commanded in the Marengo campaign, during which he was wounded.

=== Napoleonic wars ===
After having served in Holland and Hannover, Berthezène was promoted to colonel in 1807 and was given command of the 10th light infantry regiment. For his service at Heilsberg he was ennobled as a baron. After the Peace of Tilsitt Berthezène occupied the isle of Rügen.

When the War of the Fifth Coalition started, Berthezène and his regiment joined the division of Saint-Hilaire near Regensburg. During the Battle of Eckmühl Berthezène was again wounded when his regiment took the enemy positions. Under the command of Marshal Lannes, Berthezène served at Battle of Essling.

Berthezène was promoted to general de brigade on 6 August 1811. In October he was given command of Walcheren and in December 1811 he was given a command in the grenadiers of the Imperial Guard. In this latter capacity Berthezène served during the Russian Campaign where he commanded three regiments of the Young Guard. During the retreat he distinguished himself at the Battle of the Beresina.

In 1813 he was given command of a part of the Old Guard, with whom he served at Lützen and Bautzen. On 4 August 1813 Berthezène was promoted to general de division and given command of the 44th division under Marshal Gouvion Saint-Cyr under whom he served at Dresden. After the battle of Leipzig he was part of the forced besieged at Dresden and capitulated on 11 November 1813. He was held as a prisoner of war in Hungary for the duration of the war.

=== First Bourbon Restoration and Hundred Days ===
In June 1814 Berthezène was released from prison after the Bourbon Restoration and was available for military service again. Louis XVIII awarded him the croix de Saint-Louis on 19 July and attached him to the committee for war on 18 December. He was in this position at the time Napoleon landed in the Golfe-Juan. Berthezène followed him during the Hundred Days.

On 29 March, Napoléon put him in charge of the commission charged with placing half-pay officers and on 7 June he was given command of the 11th infantry division, 3rd army corps, armée du Nord. He fought at Ligny on 16 June, where his horse was shot from under him, and after Habert was badly wounded at Wavre took over command of his division. He drove eight Prussian battalions from the heights at Bierges. On 20 June, Dominique Vandamme put him in command of two more infantry divisions and commanded him to hold up the enemy to buy time for Marshal Grouchy to take up position at Dinant - this led to a fierce battle beneath the walls of Namur in which Berthezène's horse was again killed under him.

When the provisional government seemed to wish to withdraw behind Paris, Berthezène was sent to take command of 3rd corps, but the armistice was concluded and he returned to his division. After Napoleon's second abdication, he commanded the rearguard corps in the Loire until the licensing.

=== Second Bourbon Restoration ===
After the licensing of the armée de la Loire, the general came to Paris, where he stayed. General Despinois, commander of Paris, summoned him to see his chief of staff and told him that he could authorise his stay in Paris and that he had to see the minister for war (the Duc de Feltre). The general went to find the minister, who told him to go to his estate. Authorised on 16 September to retire to his estates, on 9 December he was granted permission to retire to Belgium. After a couple of months his exile was retracted and he was allowed to return to France. Pierre Berthezène was placed on the non-active list on 18 April 1816. In 1818 he was named an inspector-general of the infantry by Marshal Gouvion Saint-Cyr. In 1820 he was again placed on active duty.

Having been named a member of the advisory committee on the infantry in January 1830, Berthezène was given command of the 1st infantry division for the French invasion of Algeria. On 14 June 1830 Berthezène landed his troops on the coast near Algiers and attacked and took an artillery battery of 16 pieces. Berthezène then took part in the fighting for the city of Algiers.

=== July Monarchy ===
After the July Revolution Berthezène returned to France in November. In February 1831 Berthezène replaced Bertrand Clauzel as military governor of Algeria. He took office on 21 March and served until the end of December 1831 during his tenure he concentrated French efforts on the city of Algiers and other major ports opposing designs on the Algerian hinterland that exceeded the resources available to him. He returned to France in January 1832 and was made Peer of France in October of that year. In the Chamber of Pairs, Berthezène acted as a moderate, mainly concentrating on issues regarding the colonization of Algeria.

In the early 1840s Berthezène became embroiled in a dispute between Marshal Gérard and Marshal Grouchy about the latter’s actions during the Waterloo campaign.

Pierre Berthezène died at Vendargues on 9 October 1847.

== Works ==
- Dix huit mois en Algérie
- Souvenirs militaires, publié par son fils, Paris, 1855.

== Notes and references ==
- Mullié, Charles (1852). "BERTHEZÈNE (PIERRE, baron)" . Biographie des célébrités militaires des armées de terre et de mer de 1789 à 1850 (in French). Paris: Poignavant et Compagnie.
- Bouillet, Marie-Nicolas; Chassang, Alexis, eds. (1878). Dictionnaire Bouillet (in French).
- "Pierre Berthezène", in Adolphe Robert and Gaston Cougny, Dictionnaire des parlementaires français (1789–1891), Bourloton, Paris, 1889 Edition details Wikisource
