= Lauren Wells =

Lauren Wells may refer to:

- Lauren Wells (footballer) (born 1988), English footballer
- Lauren Wells (hurdler) (born 1988), Australian track and field athlete
