= 2004–05 UEFA Women's Cup knockout phase =

Tournament details
- Dates: 23 October 2004 – 21 May 2005
- Teams: 8

The 2004–05 UEFA Women's Cup knockout phase began on 23 October 2004 and concluded on 15 and 21 May 2005 with the two legged tie at the Stockholm Olympic Stadium in Stockholm, Sweden and Karl-Liebknecht-Stadion in Potsdam, Germany to decide the champions of the 2004–05 UEFA Women's Cup. A total of 8 teams competed in the knockout phase. Turbine Potsdam won after defeating Djurgården 5-1 on aggregate.

== Bracket ==
Quarter-finals
(Sweden) Djurgården	2	1	3
(Sweden) Umeå	1	0	1
(Italy) Torres	2	1	3
(England) Arsenal	0	4	4
(Russia) Energy Voronezh	1	1	2
(Germany) Turbine Potsdam	1	4	5
(Belarus) Bobruichanka Bobruisk	0	1	1
(Norway) Trondheims-Ørn	4	2	6

Semi-finals
(Sweden) Djurgården	1	1	2
(England) Arsenal	1	0	1
(Germany) Turbine Potsdam	4	3	7
(Norway) Trondheims-Ørn	0	1	1

Final
(Sweden) Djurgården	0	1	1
(Germany) Turbine Potsdam	2	3	5

== Quarter-finals ==
Team 1	Agg.	Team 2	1st leg	2nd leg
Djurgården (Sweden)	3–1	(Sweden) Umeå	2–1	1–0
Torres (Italy)	3–4	(England) Arsenal	2–0	1–4
Energy Voronezh (Russia)	2–5	(Germany) Turbine Potsdam	1–1	1–4
Bobruichanka Bobruisk (Belarus)	1–6	(Norway) Trondheims-Ørn	0–4	1–2

27 October 2004

Djurgården (Sweden)	2–1	(Sweden) Umeå
Bengtsson 5'; Fagerström 7'	Report	Kalmari 87'

Stockholms, Stockholm
Referee: Bente Skogvang (Norway)
31 October 2004

Umeå (Sweden)	0–1	(Sweden) Djurgården
	Report	Nykvist 51'

Gammliavallen, Umeå
Referee: Dagmar Damkova (Czech Republic)

Djurgården won 3–1 on aggregate

23 October 2004

Torres (Italy)	2–0	(England) Arsenal
Conti 19'; Guarino 78'	Report

Vanni Sanna, Sassari
Referee: Noëlle Robin (France)
31 October 2004

Arsenal (England)	4–1	(Italy) Torres
Banks 36'; Tona 39' (o.g.); Ludlow 72'; Fleeting 82'	Report	Pedersen 68'

Meadow Park, Borehamwood
Referee: Ilonka Milanova Djaleva (Bulgaria)

Arsenal won 4–3 on aggregate

24 October 2004

Energy Voronezh (Russia)	1–1	(Germany) Turbine Potsdam
Rastetter 48'	Report	Becher 86'

Central Stadium, Voronezh
Referee: Anri Hänninen (Finland)
31 October 2004

Turbine Potsdam (Germany)	4–1	(Russia) Energy Voronezh
Mittag 15'; Wimbersky 64' 73' (pen.); Odebrecht 82'	Report	Bosikova 52'

Karl-Liebknecht-Stadion, Potsdam
Referee: Gyöngyi Gaál (Hungary)

Turbine Potsdam won 5–2 on aggregate

27 October 2004

Bobruichanka Bobruisk (Belarus)	0–4	(Norway) Trondheims-Ørn
	Report	Engen 12' 50'; Enlid 15' (pen.) 68' (pen.)

Spartak Stadium, Bobruisk
Referee: Sjoukje De Jong (Netherlands)
6 November 2004

Trondheims-Ørn (Norway)	2–1	(Belarus) Bobruichanka Bobruisk
Mørkved 56'; Sandaune 90+5'	Report	Kazeeva 37'

Lade Idrettsanlegg, Trondheim
Referee: Christine Beck (Germany)

Trondheims-Ørn won 6–1 on aggregate

== Semi-finals ==
Team 1	Agg.	Team 2	1st leg	2nd leg
Djurgården (Sweden)	2–1	(England) Arsenal	1–1	1–0
Turbine Potsdam (Germany)	7–1	(Norway) Trondheims-Ørn	4–0	3–1

7 April 2005

Djurgården (Sweden)	1–1	(England) Arsenal
Ekblom 39'	Report	Fleeting 23'

Råsunda, Solna
Attendance: 442
Referee: Natalia Avdonchenko (Russia)
15 April 2005

Arsenal (England)	0–1	(Sweden) Djurgården
	Report	Svensson 41'

Meadow Park, Borehamwood
Attendance: 1,808
Referee: Gyöngyi Gaál (Hungary)

Djurgården won 2–1 on aggregate

9 April 2005

Turbine Potsdam (Germany)	4–0	(Norway) Trondheims-Ørn
Pohlers 53' 56' 85'; Wimbersky 73'	Report

Karl-Liebknecht-Stadion, Potsdam
Referee: Sarah Girard (France)
16 April 2005

Trondheims-Ørn (Norway)	1–3	(Germany) Turbine Potsdam
Pedersen 42'	Report	Hingst 54' 71'; Mittag 68'

Lerkendal Stadion, Trondheim
Referee: Ilonka Milanova Djaleva (Bulgaria)

Turbine Potsdam won 7–1 on aggregate

== Final ==
Team 1	Agg.	Team 2	1st leg	2nd leg
Djurgården (Sweden)	1–5	(Germany) Turbine Potsdam	0–2	1–3

15 May 2005
13:00 (CET)

Djurgården (Sweden)	0–2	(Germany) Turbine Potsdam
	Report	Pohlers 34'; Mittag 53'

Stockholms Stadion, Stockholm
Attendance: 1,382
Referee: Anna De Toni (Italy)
21 May 2005
13:00 (CET)

Turbine Potsdam (Germany)	3–1	(Sweden) Djurgården
Wimbersky 2'; Pohlers 9' 16'	Report	Bengtsson 10'

Karl-Liebknecht-Stadion, Potsdam
Attendance: 8,677
Referee: Lale Orta (Turkey)

Turbine Potsdam won 5–1 on aggregate

UEFA Women's Cup
2004-05 winners

First title
