= Flavia Schwarz =

Swiss footballer (born 1986)

Personal information
- Full name: Flavia Schwarz
- Date of birth: 7 November 1986 (age 39)
- Place of birth: Zürich, Switzerland
- Height: 1.71 m (5 ft 7 in)
- Position: Midfielder

Senior career*
Years	Team	Apps	(Gls)
2001–2010	Zürich		
2010–2011	Zuchwil		

International career
- Switzerland
- * Club domestic league appearances and goals

Flavia Schwarz (born 7 November 1986) is a Swiss former football midfielder who played for FC Zürich and FFC Zuchwil 05 in the Nationalliga A. She currently serves as FC Zürich second team's assistant coach.

She was a member of the Swiss national team, and previously she played the 2005 U-19 Euro and the 2006 U-20 World Cup.
