= Tatyana Shramok =

Belarusian footballer

Personal information
- Full name: Tatyana Shramok
- Date of birth: 3 June 1982 (age 44)
- Place of birth: Soviet Union
- Position: Midfielder

Senior career*
Years	Team	Apps	(Gls)
2004	Nika^{ru}		
- Bobruichanka
- Lehenda Chernihiv

International career
- Belarus
- * Club domestic league appearances and goals

Tatyana Shramok is a Belarusian football midfielder, currently playing for Lehenda Chernihiv in the Ukrainian League. She has taken part in the Champions League with Bobruichanka and Lehenda, and she is a member of the Belarusian national team.
