= Olga Novikova (footballer) =

Belarusian footballer

Personal information
- Full name: Olga Evgenyevna Novikova
- Date of birth: 9 December 1977 (age 48)
- Place of birth: Soviet Union
- Positions: Midfielder; striker

Senior career*
Years	Team	Apps	(Gls)
- Babruyshanka
- Universitet Vitebsk
2007–2008	Nadezhda		
2009	Izmailovo	9	(0)
2010	Ryazan	22	(0)
2011	Zorky	16	(2)

International career
1995–2011	Belarus		
- * Club domestic league appearances and goals

Olga Novikova is a Belarusian football striker, who last played for Zorky Krasnogorsk in the Russian Championship. She has also played for FC Babruyshanka, Universitet Vitebsk (Belarusian League), Nadezhda Noginsk, ShVSM Izmailovo and Ryazan VDV.

She was a member of the Belarusian national team since 1995.
