= Ladomerská Vieska =

Municipality of Slovakia

Ladomerská Vieska Ladomérmindszent
- Municipality
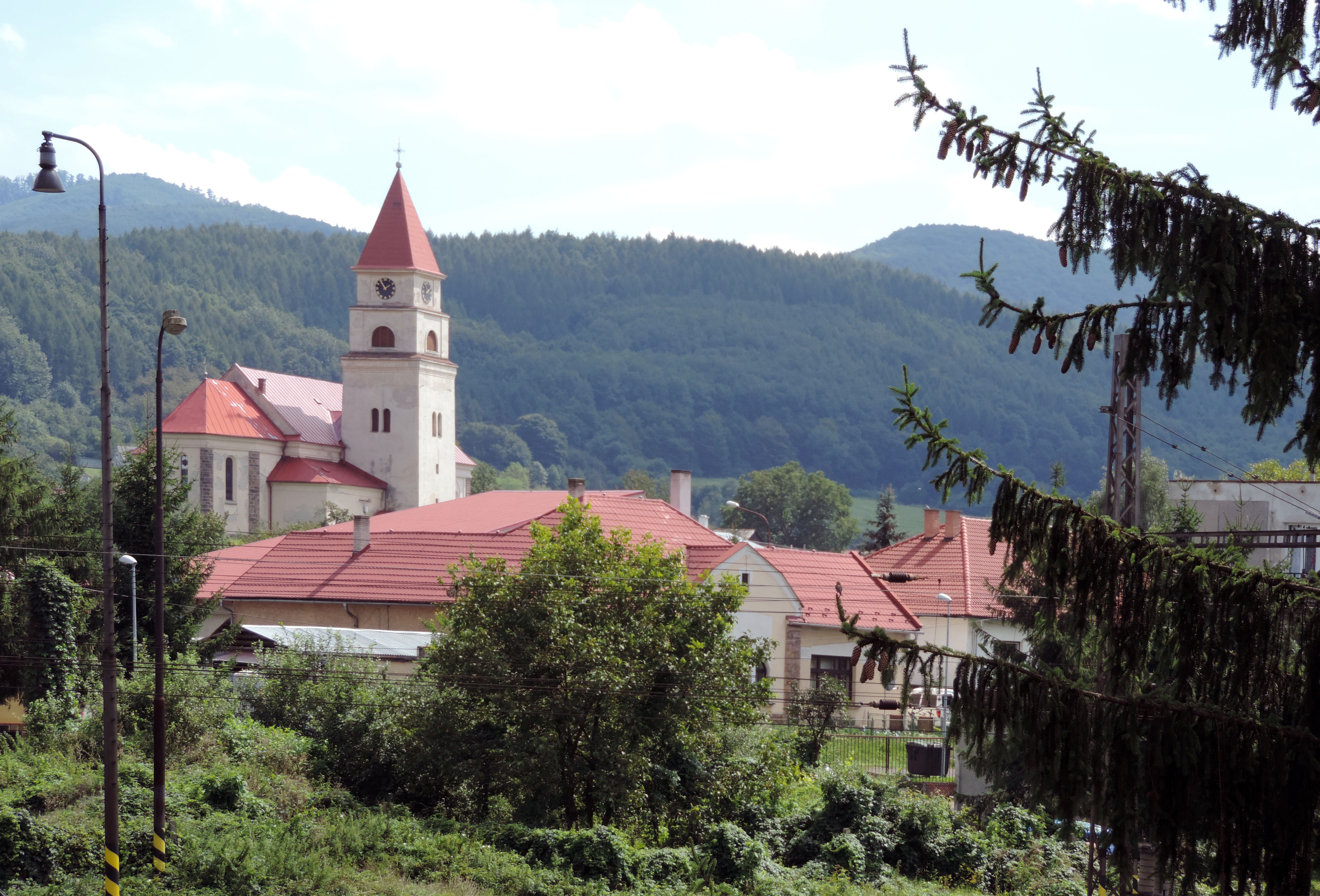
- Church of Christ, the King

- Flag

- Location of Ladomerská Vieska in the Banská Bystrica Region Location of Ladomerská Vieska in Slovakia
- Coordinates: 48.58°N 18.88°E
- Country: Slovakia
- Region: Banská Bystrica Region
- District: Žiar nad Hronom District
- First mentioned: 1335

Area
  - Total: 10.41 km^{2} (4.02 sq mi)
- Elevation: 262 m (860 ft)

Population (2025)
  - Total: 757
- Time zone: UTC+1 (CET)
  - Summer (DST): UTC+2 (CEST)
- Postal code: 965 01
- Area code: +421 45
- Vehicle registration plate (until 2022): ZH
- Website: www.ladomerska-vieska.sk

Ladomerská Vieska (Hungarian: Ladomérmindszent) is a village and municipality in Žiar nad Hronom District in the Banská Bystrica Region of central Slovakia.

== History ==
In historical records the village was first mentioned in 1335 AD.

== Geography ==
The municipality lies at an altitude of 262 metres (860 ft) and covers an area of 10.41 km^{2} (4.02 sq mi) (2025).

== Population ==
Population statistic (10 years)
| Year | 1995 | 2005 | 2015 | 2025 |
|---|---|---|---|---|
| Count | 807 | 770 | 804 | 757 |
| Difference | | −4.58% | +4.41% | −5.84% |

Population statistic
| Year | 2024 | 2025 |
|---|---|---|
| Count | 758 | 757 |
| Difference | | −0.13% |

It has a population of 757 people (31 December 2025).

=== Ethnicity ===
Census 2021 (1+ %)
| Ethnicity | Number | Fraction |
|---|---|---|
| Slovak | 772 | 97.47% |
| Not found out | 20 | 2.52% |
| Total | 792 | |

In year 2021 was 792 people by ethnicity 772 as Slovak, 20 as Not found out, 5 as Czech, 5 as Romani, 3 as Russian, 2 as Hungarian, 1 as Jewish and 1 as English.

Note on population: The difference values of population numbers in the table "Population statistic" and in the sections "Ethnicity" & "Religion" is caused by the use of various statistical methods.

=== Religion ===
Census 2021 (1+ %)
| Religion | Number | Fraction |
|---|---|---|
| Roman Catholic Church | 522 | 65.91% |
| None | 213 | 26.89% |
| Not found out | 26 | 3.28% |
| Evangelical Church | 12 | 1.52% |
| Total | 792 | |

In year 2021 was 792 people by religion 522 from Roman Catholic Church, 213 from None, 26 from Not found out, 12 from Evangelical Church, 6 from Christian Congregations in Slovakia, 4 from Greek Catholic Church, 2 from Church of the Brethren, 2 from Ad hoc movements, 1 from Jewish community, 1 from Calvinist Church, 1 from Paganism and natural spirituality, 1 from Other and not ascertained christian church and 1 from Other.
