= 2004–05 UEFA Women's Cup =

Tournament details
- Teams: 43 (42 associations)

Final positions
- Champions: (Germany) FFC Turbine Potsdam (1st title)
- Runners-up: (Sweden) Djurgården/Älvsjö

Tournament statistics
- Top scorer(s): (Germany) Conny Pohlers; 14 goals

The UEFA Women's Cup 2004–05 was the fourth edition of the UEFA Women's Cup football club tournament. It was won by Germany's FFC Turbine Potsdam against Djurgården of Sweden in the final for their first title in the competition. It was the second time a German side won the competition.

== Teams ==
Second qualifying round
(Sweden) Umeå (TH)	(Germany) Turbine Potsdam (CH)	(England) Arsenal (CH)	(Sweden) Djurgården (CH)
(Denmark) Brøndby (CH)	(Norway) Trondheims-Ørn (CH)	(Italy) Torres (CH)	
First qualifying round
(Serbia and Montenegro) Mašinac Classic Niš (CH)	(Azerbaijan) Gömrükçü Baku (CH)	(Czech Republic) Slavia Prague (CH)	(Spain) Athletic Club Neskak (CH)
(Iceland) KR (CH)	(Belgium) Rapide Wezemaal (CH)	(Russia) Energy Voronezh (CH)	(Austria) Neulengbach (CH)
(France) Montpellier (CH)	(Kazakhstan) Alma (CH)	(Belarus) Bobruichanka Bobruisk (CH)	(Switzerland) Zuchwil (CH)
(Israel) Maccabi Holon (CH)	(Netherlands) Ter Leede (CH)	(Bosnia and Herzegovina) ZNK-SFK 2000 (CH)	(Hungary) Viktória FC-Szombathely (CH)
(Poland) AZS Wrocław (CH)	(Portugal) 1° Dezembro (CH)	(Bulgaria) Super Sport Sofia (CH)	(Ukraine) Metalist Kharkiv (CH)
(Scotland) Hibernian (CH)	(Wales) Cardiff City (CW)	(Greece) Aegina (CH)	(Lithuania) Gintra Universitetas (CH)
(Slovenia) KRKA Novo Mesto (CH)	(Romania) CFF Clujana (CH)	(Finland) MPS (CH)	(Slovakia) Žiar nad Hronom (CH)
(Moldova) Codru Anenii Noi (CH)	(Faroe Islands) KÍ Klaksvík (CH)	(North Macedonia) Skiponjat (CH)	(Republic of Ireland) University College Dublin (CW)
(Croatia) Maksimir (CH)	(Estonia) Pärnu JK (CH)	(Northern Ireland) Newtownabbey Strikers (CH)	(Cyprus) PAOK Ledra (CH)

== Qualifying round ==
=== First qualifying round ===
==== Group A1 ====
Pos	Team	Pld	W	D	L	GF	GA	GD	Pts	Qualification	ALM	SPR	SSS	ŽNH
1	(Kazakhstan) Alma	3	3	0	0	11	2	+9	9	Advance to second qualifying round	—	2–1	5–1	–
2	(Czech Republic) Slavia Prague	3	2	0	1	8	2	+6	6		–	—	3–0	4–0
3	(Bulgaria) Super Sport Sofia	3	0	1	2	3	10	−7	1		–	–	—	2–2
4	(Slovakia) Žiar nad Hronom (H)	3	0	1	2	2	10	−8	1		0–4	–	–	—

Source: RSSSF
(H) Hosts

==== Group A2 ====
Pos	Team	Pld	W	D	L	GF	GA	GD	Pts	Qualification	EVO	GBA	GUN	SKI
1	(Russia) Energy Voronezh	3	3	0	0	27	0	+27	9	Advance to second qualifying round	—	–	11–0	13–0
2	(Azerbaijan) Gömrükçü Baku	3	2	0	1	16	4	+12	6		0–3	—	3–0	–
3	(Lithuania) Gintra-Universitetas (H)	3	1	0	2	1	14	−13	3		–	–	—	1–0
4	(North Macedonia) Skiponjat	3	0	0	3	1	27	−26	0		–	1–13	–	—

Source: RSSSF
(H) Hosts

==== Group A3 ====
Pos	Team	Pld	W	D	L	GF	GA	GD	Pts	Qualification	BOB	CAN	VIK	PAR
1	(Belarus) Bobruichanka Bobruisk (H)	3	3	0	0	7	2	+5	9	Advance to second qualifying round	—	2–0	–	2–1
2	(Moldova) Codru Anenii Noi	3	1	1	1	6	4	+2	4		–	—	1–1	–
3	(Hungary) Viktória FC-Szombathely	3	1	1	1	6	4	+2	4		1–3	–	—	4–0
4	(Estonia) Pärnu JK	3	0	0	3	2	11	−9	0		–	1–5	–	—

Source: RSSSF
(H) Hosts

==== Group A4 ====
Pos	Team	Pld	W	D	L	GF	GA	GD	Pts	Qualification	KRK	KR	TLE	MPS
1	(Slovenia) KRKA Novo Mesto (H)	3	2	0	1	4	4	0	6	Advance to second qualifying round	—	2–1	–	–
2	(Iceland) KR	3	2	0	1	5	3	+2	6		–	—	–	3–1
3	(Netherlands) Ter Leede	3	1	1	1	3	2	+1	4		2–0	0–1	—	–
4	(Finland) MPS	3	0	1	2	3	6	−3	1		1–2	–	1–1	—

Source: RSSSF
(H) Hosts

==== Group A5 ====
Pos	Team	Pld	W	D	L	GF	GA	GD	Pts	Qualification	MCN	HIB	WEZ	MAK
1	(Serbia and Montenegro) Masinac Classic Niš	3	3	0	0	10	2	+8	9	Advance to second qualifying round	—	–	4–1	2–0
2	(Scotland) Hibernian	3	2	0	1	9	6	+3	6		1–4	—	–	5–0
3	(Belgium) Rapide Wezemaal (H)	3	1	0	2	5	7	−2	3		–	2–3	—	–
4	(Croatia) Maksimir	3	0	0	3	0	9	−9	0		–	–	0–2	—

Source: RSSSF
(H) Hosts

==== Group A6 ====
Pos	Team	Pld	W	D	L	GF	GA	GD	Pts	Qualification	WRO	MKH	KIK	CAR
1	(Poland) AZS Wrocław (H)	3	3	0	0	9	2	+7	9	Advance to second qualifying round	—	2–0	–	2–1
2	(Ukraine) Metalist Kharkiv	3	2	0	1	10	4	+6	6		–	—	2–1	8–1
3	(Faroe Islands) KÍ Klaksvík	3	1	0	2	6	7	−1	3		1–5	–	—	–
4	(Wales) Cardiff City	3	0	0	3	2	14	−12	0		–	–	0–4	—

Source: RSSSF
(H) Hosts

==== Group A7 ====
Pos	Team	Pld	W	D	L	GF	GA	GD	Pts	Qualification	NES	CLU	MHO	NEW
1	(Spain) Athletic Club Neskak	3	2	1	0	16	4	+12	7	Advance to second qualifying round	—	–	1–1	10–3
2	(Romania) Clujana Cluj-Napoca (H)	3	1	1	1	3	5	−2	4		0–5	—	0–0	–
3	(Israel) Maccabi Holon	3	0	3	0	3	3	0	3		–	–	—	2–2
4	(Northern Ireland) Newtownabbey Strikers	3	0	1	2	5	15	−10	1		–	0–3	–	—

Source: RSSSF
(H) Hosts

==== Group A8 ====
Pos	Team	Pld	W	D	L	GF	GA	GD	Pts	Qualification	AEG	ZUC	SAR	PLE
1	(Greece) Aegina	3	3	0	0	10	0	+10	9	Advance to second qualifying round	—	1–0	–	7–0
2	(Switzerland) Zuchwil	3	2	0	1	17	2	+15	6		–	—	4–0	13–1
3	(Bosnia and Herzegovina) SFK Sarajevo (H)	3	1	0	2	5	6	−1	3		0–2	–	—	–
4	(Cyprus) PAOK Ledra	3	0	0	3	1	25	−24	0		–	–	0–5	—

Source: RSSSF
(H) Hosts

==== Group A9 ====
Pos	Team	Pld	W	D	L	GF	GA	GD	Pts	Qualification	MON	NEU	DEZ	UCD
1	(France) Montpellier (H)	3	3	0	0	13	0	+13	9	Advance to second qualifying round	—	7–0	–	5–0
2	(Austria) Neulengbach	3	2	0	1	7	10	−3	6		–	—	–	4–2
3	(Portugal) 1.º de Dezembro	3	0	1	2	2	5	−3	1		0–1	1–3	—	–
4	(Republic of Ireland) University College Dublin	3	0	1	2	3	10	−7	1		–	–	1–1	—

Source: RSSSF
(H) Hosts

=== Second qualifying round ===
==== Group B1 ====
Pos	Team	Pld	W	D	L	GF	GA	GD	Pts	Qualification	UME	BOB	MCN	KRK
1	(Sweden) Umeå	3	3	0	0	20	2	+18	9	Advance to quarter-finals	—	5–1	–	7–1
2	(Belarus) Bobruichanka Bobruisk	3	1	1	1	5	5	0	4	Advance to quarter-finals	–	—	–	4–0
3	(Serbia and Montenegro) Masinac Classic Niš (H)	3	1	1	1	2	8	−6	4		0–8	0–0	—	–
4	(Slovenia) KRKA Novo Mesto	3	0	0	3	1	13	−12	0		–	–	0–2	—

Source: RSSSF
(H) Hosts

==== Group B2 ====
Pos	Team	Pld	W	D	L	GF	GA	GD	Pts	Qualification	ARS	DJU	NES	AEG
1	(England) Arsenal	3	2	1	0	10	3	+7	7	Advance to quarter-finals	—	1–0	2–2	–
2	(Sweden) Djurgården (H)	3	2	0	1	8	3	+5	6	Advance to quarter-finals	–	—	3–2	5–0
3	(Spain) Athletic Club Neskak	3	1	1	1	9	6	+3	4		–	–	—	5–1
4	(Greece) Aegina	3	0	0	3	2	17	−15	0		1–7	–	–	—

Source: RSSSF
(H) Hosts

==== Group B3 ====
Pos	Team	Pld	W	D	L	GF	GA	GD	Pts	Qualification	TPO	TOR	WRO	MON
1	(Germany) Turbine Potsdam (H)	3	3	0	0	17	6	+11	9	Advance to quarter-finals	—	–	4–1	6–0
2	(Italy) Torres	3	2	0	1	12	8	+4	6	Advance to quarter-finals	5–7	—	5–0	–
3	(Poland) AZS Wrocław	3	1	0	2	3	9	−6	3		–	–	—	2–0
4	(France) Montpellier	3	0	0	3	1	10	−9	0		–	1–2	–	—

Source: RSSSF
(H) Hosts

==== Group B4 ====
Pos	Team	Pld	W	D	L	GF	GA	GD	Pts	Qualification	ØRN	EVO	BRØ	ALM
1	(Norway) Trondheims-Ørn	3	2	1	0	6	1	+5	7	Advance to quarter-finals	—	1–1	–	3–0
2	(Russia) Energy Voronezh	3	1	2	0	6	3	+3	5	Advance to quarter-finals	–	—	–	4–1
3	(Denmark) Brøndby (H)	3	1	1	1	3	3	0	4		0–2	1–1	—	–
4	(Kazakhstan) Alma	3	0	0	3	1	9	−8	0		–	–	0–2	—

Source: RSSSF
(H) Hosts

== Knockout phase ==
=== Bracket ===
Quarter-finals
(Sweden) Djurgården	2	1	3
(Sweden) Umeå	1	0	1
(Italy) Torres	2	1	3
(England) Arsenal	0	4	4
(Russia) Energy Voronezh	1	1	2
(Germany) Turbine Potsdam	1	4	5
(Belarus) Bobruichanka Bobruisk	0	1	1
(Norway) Trondheims-Ørn	4	2	6

Semi-finals
(Sweden) Djurgården	1	1	2
(England) Arsenal	1	0	1
(Germany) Turbine Potsdam	4	3	7
(Norway) Trondheims-Ørn	0	1	1

Final
(Sweden) Djurgården	0	1	1
(Germany) Turbine Potsdam	2	3	5

=== Quarter-finals ===
Team 1	Agg.	Team 2	1st leg	2nd leg
Djurgården (Sweden)	3–1	(Sweden) Umeå	2–1	1–0
Torres (Italy)	3–4	(England) Arsenal	2–0	1–4
Energy Voronezh (Russia)	2–5	(Germany) Turbine Potsdam	1–1	1–4
Bobruichanka Bobruisk (Belarus)	1–6	(Norway) Trondheims-Ørn	0–4	1–2

=== Semi-finals ===
Team 1	Agg.	Team 2	1st leg	2nd leg
Djurgården (Sweden)	2–1	(England) Arsenal	1–1	1–0
Turbine Potsdam (Germany)	7–1	(Norway) Trondheims-Ørn	4–0	3–1

=== Final ===
Team 1	Agg.	Team 2	1st leg	2nd leg
Djurgården (Sweden)	1–5	(Germany) Turbine Potsdam	0–2	1–3

15 May 2005
13:00 (CET)

Djurgården (Sweden)	0–2	(Germany) Turbine Potsdam
	Report	Pohlers 34'; Mittag 53'

Stockholms Stadion, Stockholm
Attendance: 1,382
Referee: Anna De Toni (Italy)
21 May 2005
13:00 (CET)

Turbine Potsdam (Germany)	3–1	(Sweden) Djurgården
Wimbersky 2'; Pohlers 9' 16'	Report	Bengtsson 10'

Karl-Liebknecht-Stadion, Potsdam
Attendance: 8,677
Referee: Lale Orta (Turkey)

Turbine Potsdam won 5–1 on aggregate

UEFA Women's Cup
2004-05 winners

First title

== Top goalscorers ==
(excluding qualifying round)

Rank	Player	Team	Goals
1	(Germany) Conny Pohlers	Turbine Potsdam	6
2	(Germany) Petra Wimbersky	Turbine Potsdam	4
3	(Germany) Anja Mittag	Turbine Potsdam	3
