= FFC Zuchwil 05 =

Swiss association football club

- Full name: Frauen Fussball Club Zuchwil 05
- Founded: 13 March 2005
- Ground: Sportzentrum Zuchwil
- Capacity: 1,000
- League: Nationalliga B
- 2010-11: Nationalliga A, 9th (relegated)
- Website: http://www.ffczuchwil05.ch
Home colours	Away colours

FFC Zuchwil 05 is a women's football club from Zuchwil, Switzerland. Founded in 1970 in Solothurn as the women's section of DFC Solothurn, which moved to Zuchwil twenty years later, the team was refounded in 2005 as FFC Zuchwil 05 after the Swiss Football Association allowed pure women's football clubs, taking its current name.

Zuchwil played in the Nationalliga A, the country's top category, from 2000 to 2011. Standing in the top positions of the table since 2002, it won the Nationalliga in 2007 and was the championship's runner-up in 2004, 2006 and 2008, taking part three times in the UEFA Women's Cup.

However, the team declined in subsequent seasons, ending 3rd to last in 2010 and 2nd to last the following year. Zuchwil couldn't make it into the top spots of the ensuing promotion round, and was relegated to the Nationalliga B for the 2011-12 season. As of the end of 2011 the team is last in the category's table.

== Honours ==
- 1 Swiss League (2007)

Other results in the Nat. A
Position	Years
2	2004, 2006, 2008
3	2002
4	2003
5	2005, 2009
6	2001
8	2000, 2010
9	2011 (r)

=== Record in UEFA competitions ===
Season	Competition	Stage	Result	Opponent
2004-05	UEFA Women's Cup	Qualifying Stage	4-0	(Bosnia and Herzegovina) Sarajevo
			13-1	(Cyprus) PAOK Ledra
			0-1	(Greece) Aegina
2006-07	UEFA Women's Cup	Qualifying Stage	0-2	(Finland) HJK
			3-1	(North Macedonia) Skiponjat
			2-2	(Poland) Wrocław
2007-08	UEFA Women's Cup	Qualifying Stage	5-1	(Northern Ireland) Glentoran
			6-0	(Lithuania) Gintra Universitetas
			0-5	(England) Everton

=== Former players ===
- (Switzerland) Flavia Schwarz
