= Julie Ferguson =

Scottish footballer

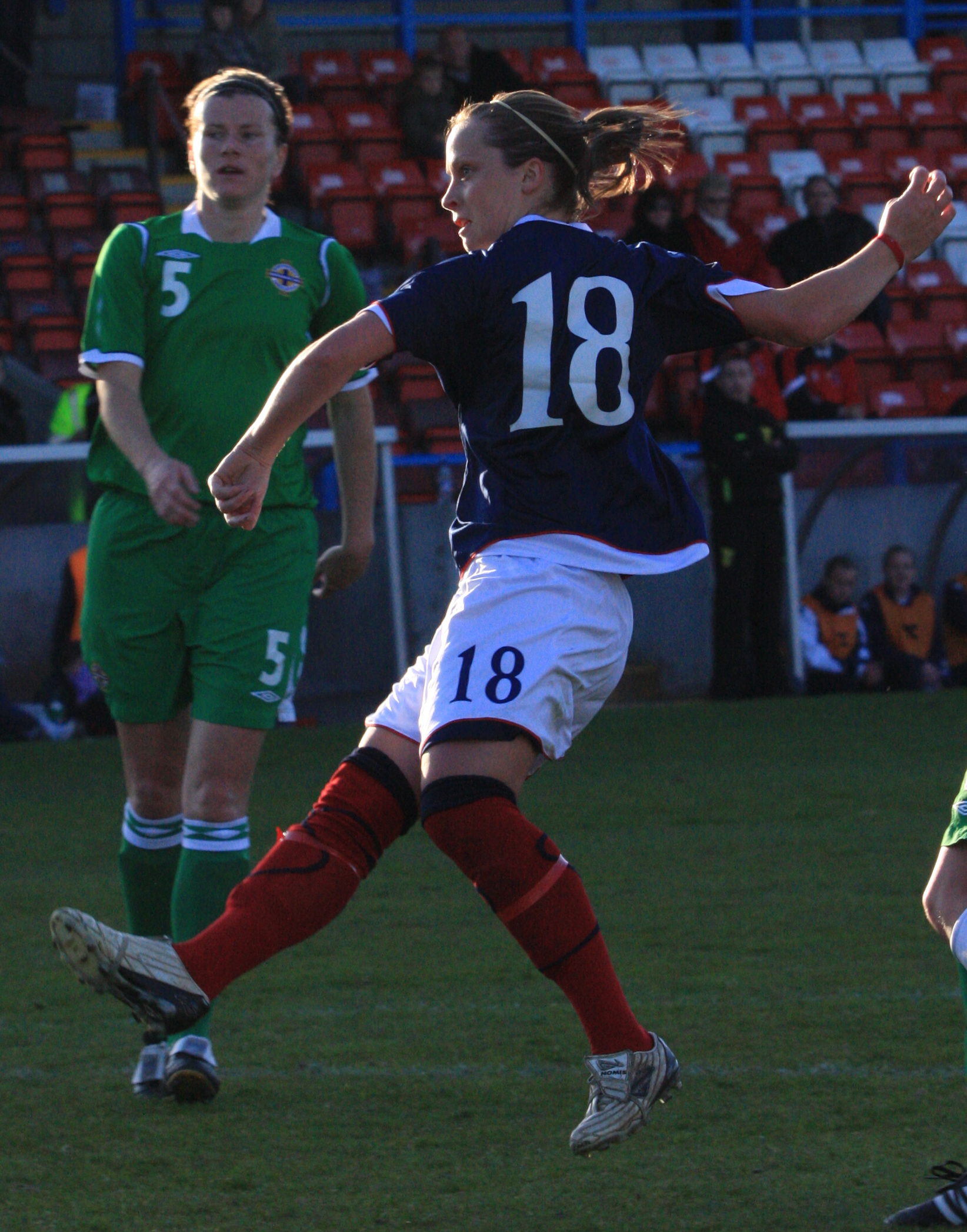
- Ferguson (18) playing for Scotland in May 2009

Personal information
- Full name: Julie Ferguson
- Date of birth: 10 February 1979 (age 47)
- Place of birth: Glasgow, Scotland
- Position: Right-back

College career
Years	Team	Apps	(Gls)
2002–2003	Florida Atlantic Owls	26	(17)

Senior career*
Years	Team	Apps	(Gls)
	Maryhill Eagles	81	(101)
1998–2002	Glasgow City	40	(30)
2003–2004	Glasgow City	70	(42)
2004–2008	Hibernian Ladies	60	(45)
2008–2011	Celtic	61	(20)
2015–2016	Motherwell Ladies	11	(8)

International career^{‡}
2003–2009	Scotland	67	(0)
- * Club domestic league appearances and goals as of 12:00, 19 June 2011 (UTC) ‡ National team caps and goals as of 12:00, 19 June 2011 (UTC)

Julie Ferguson (born 10 February 1979) is a Scottish former international footballer. She finished her career with SWFL 2nd Division side Motherwell having previously played for Florida Atlantic, Celtic, Glasgow City and Hibernian Ladies. Ferguson amassed 67 appearances for the Scotland women's national football team.

== Club career ==
Following an unrivalled junior career at Maryhill Eagles, where Ferguson broke all goal-scoring records, Glasgow City came calling and Ferguson signed a 4-year deal running until 2002. During her initial spell with Glasgow Ferguson continued her goal-scoring exploits of her youth days, scoring 30 goals in 40 appearances.

In 2002 Ferguson moved to the NCAA Division 1 in the United States, signing for Florida Atlantic Owls, and Ferguson tore it up. The freshman was named to the Soccer America Team-of-the-Week for the week of 7 October. Ferguson became the first ever Lady Owl to be named to the Soccer America team after she recorded five goals and four assists in two conference wins for FAU. The Glasgow, Scotland native tied or broke five records for scoring the most goals in a game (4), most assists in a season (11), quickest goal (4 seconds) and most assists in a game (3). Ferguson ranked second in the nation in assists per game and 12th in the country in points per game.

Following a short stint back at Glasgow in 2003, Ferguson signed for Hibernian, the happiest period of her career, in October 2003. She went on to become a key component of the side which won the Premier League in 2004 and 2006.

Ferguson has epilepsy which was precipitated by a fractured eye socket sustained with Florida Atlantic Owls. In a 2007 Cup semi-final, Ferguson recalls being accused of "cheating" after being carried off following a seizure. When Hibernian subsequently scored twice to win the game in stoppage time, piqued opposition players complained that Ferguson had faked the seizure to bring about the added time. She suffered another seizure on the pitch while playing for Celtic in April 2009. Ferguson has worked to raise awareness for those dealing with epilepsy, through charity Quarriers.

In April 2015, after a spell out of football, Ferguson returned to the game to sign for SWFL 2nd Division side Motherwell. She made her debut in a 0–5 win away to Claremont on 26 April 2015. Within two months, she had already hit double figures in terms of goals and formed part of the team which won the SWFL Second Division Cup, beating Rangers 2–6 in the Final.

On 6 February 2017 it was rumoured Ferguson was considering another comeback, following her retirement in 2016. On 20 June 2017, Ferguson confirmed that she remains retired during an interview with BBC Radio Scotland.

== International career ==
In November 2003 Ferguson started Scotland's 5–0 friendly defeat to England at Deepdale.
