= Stadionul Mihai Adam =

Stadium in Câmpia Turzii, Romania

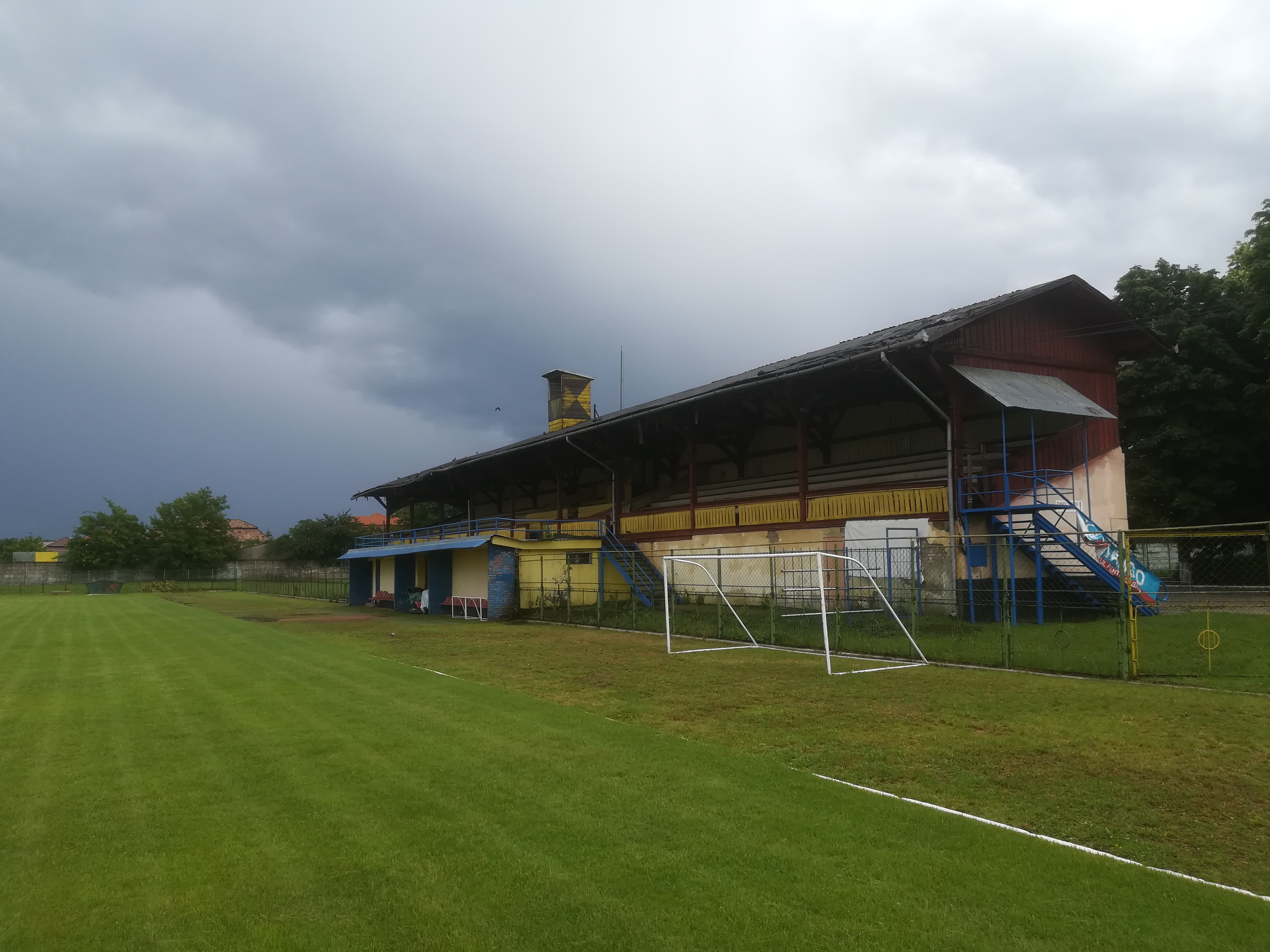
- Interactive map of Stadionul Mihai Adam
- Former names: ISCT; Mechel
- Location: Câmpia Turzii, Romania
- Coordinates: 46.5412°N 23.8841°E
- Owner: Câmpia Turzii Municipality
- Operator: CSM Câmpia Turzii
- Capacity: 2,700
- Surface: grass

Construction
- Opened: 1908
- Renovated: 1961

Tenants
- CSM Câmpia Turzii (1921–present); Arieșul Turda

Stadionul Mihai Adam is a multi-use stadium in Câmpia Turzii, Romania. It is currently used mostly for football matches and is the home ground of CSM Câmpia Turzii.

The stadium holds 2,700 people. The name of the stadium is in honour of footballer Mihai Adam, who was born in Câmpia Turzii and started his career at IS Câmpia Turzii. He scored 160 goals in 353 Romanian First League matches, also managing to be three times the top goalscorer of the league. The official tribune is the old tribune from the Stadionul Ion Moina, moved here when the stadium was renovated and expanded in 1960.

== Gallery ==
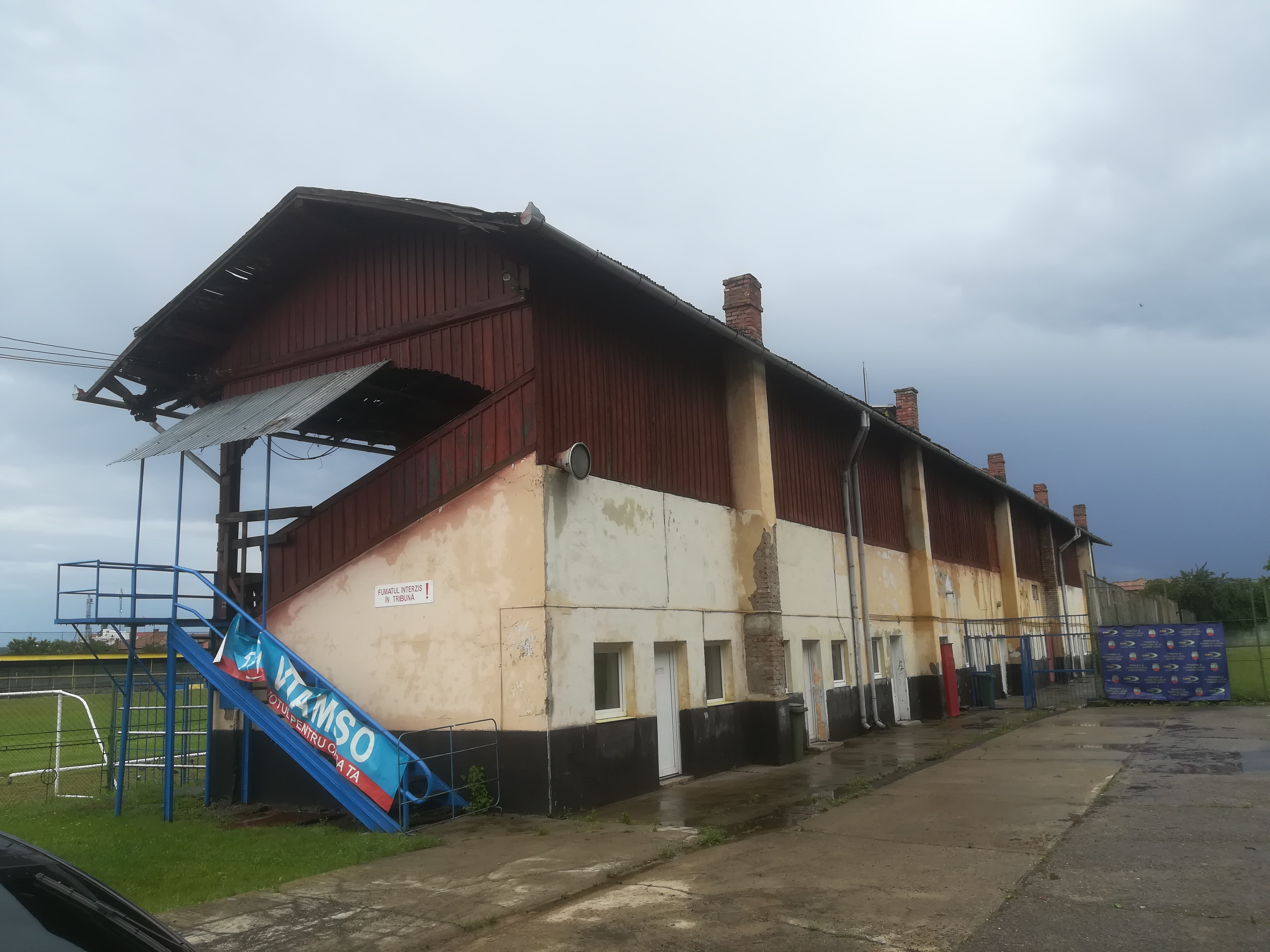
Exterior view of the stadium.

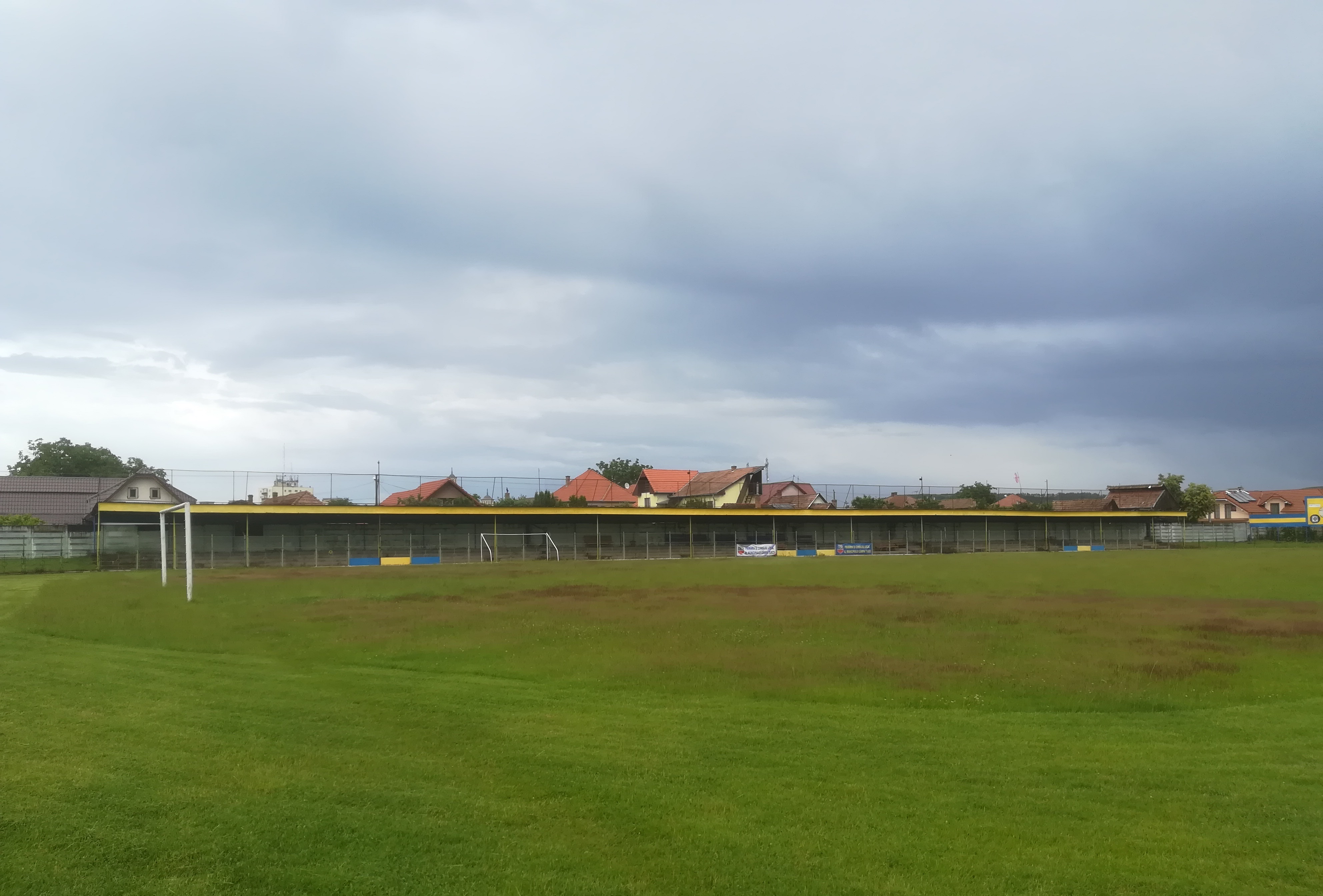
View of 2nd Stand.

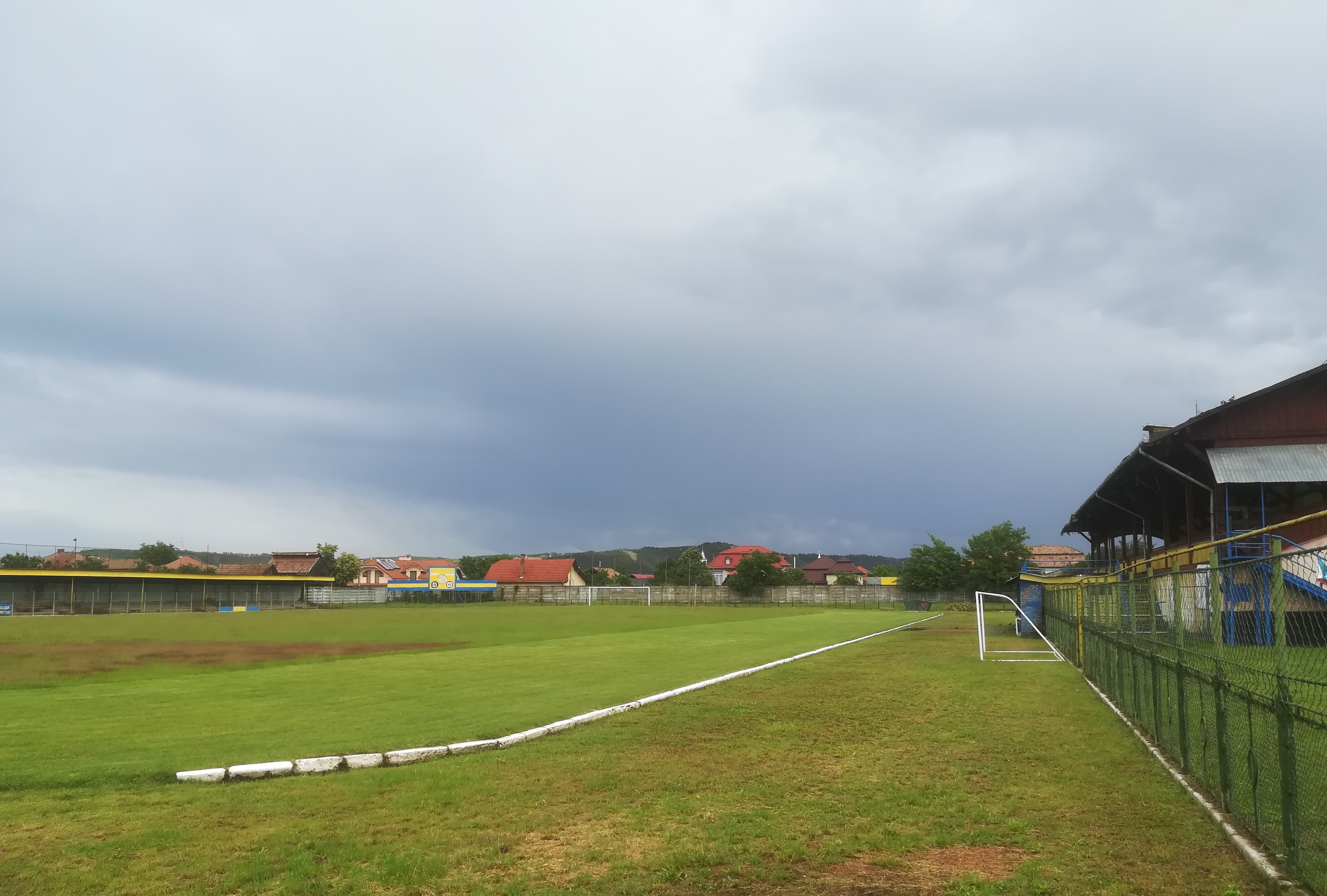
View of the stadium.
