= Natalia Ivanova (footballer) =

Kazakhstani footballer

Personal information
- Date of birth: 11 December 1979 (age 46)
- Position: Defender

Senior career*
Years	Team	Apps	(Gls)
- Temir
- BIIK Kazygurt
- Universitet Vitebsk
- CSHVSM
- BIIK Kazygurt

International career^{‡}
2003–2014	Kazakhstan	13	(0)
- * Club domestic league appearances and goals ‡ National team caps and goals as of 19 June 2014

Natalia Ivanova (Russian: Наталья Иванова; born 11 December 1979) is a Kazakhstani former footballer who played as a defender. She has been a member of the Kazakhstan women's national team.
