= Vendargues =

- Commune
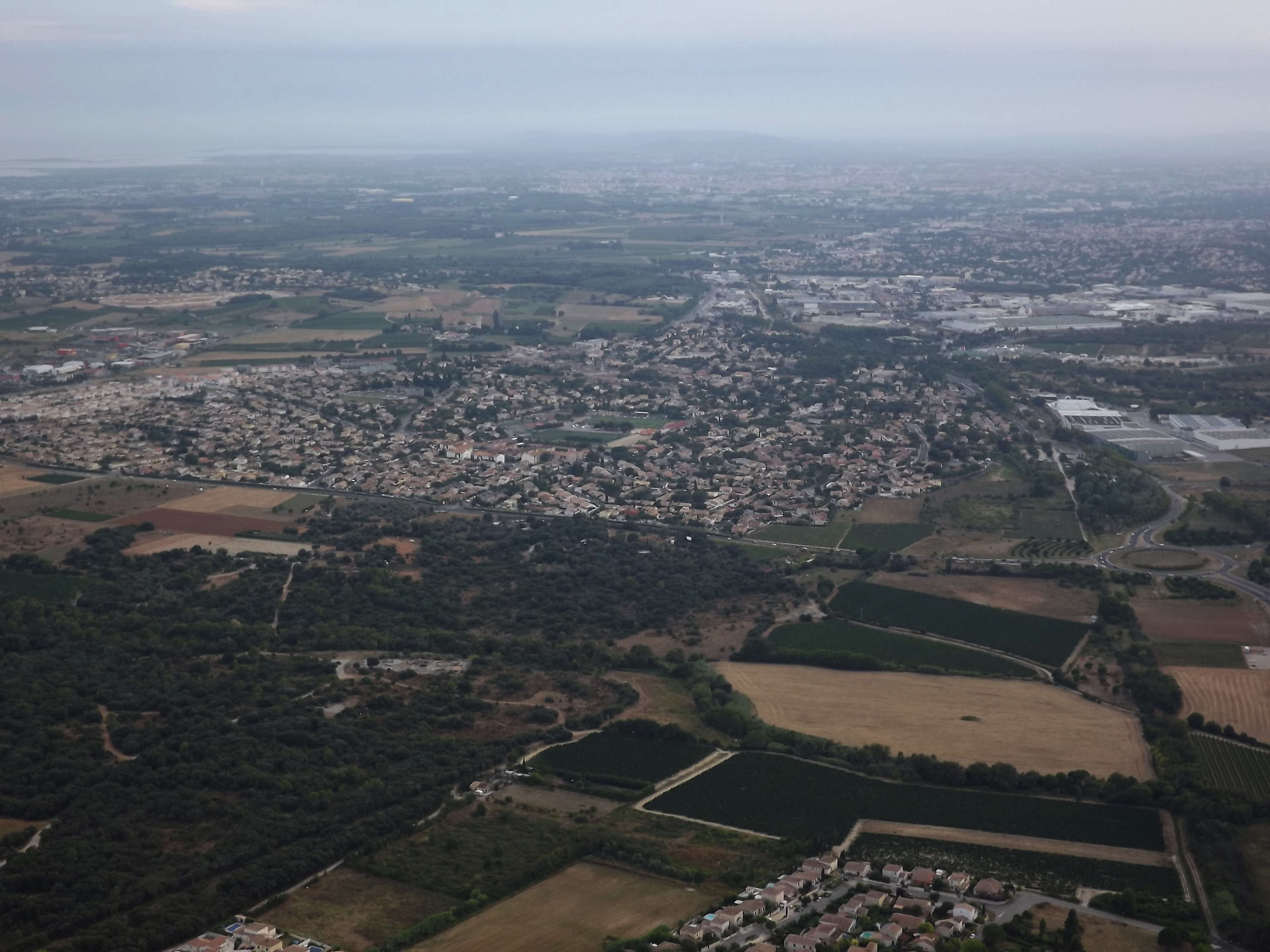
- An aerial view of Vendargues

- Coat of arms
- Location of Vendargues
- Location within France Location within Occitanie
- Coordinates: 43°39′30″N 3°58′12″E
- Country: France
- Region: Occitania
- Department: Hérault
- Arrondissement: Montpellier
- Canton: Le Crès
- Intercommunality: Montpellier Méditerranée Métropole

Government
  - Mayor (2020–2026): Guy Lauret
- Area^{1}: 8.98 km^{2} (3.47 sq mi)
- Highest elevation: 86 m (282 ft)
- Lowest elevation: 25 m (82 ft)
- Population (2023): 7,262
  - Density: 809/km^{2} (2,090/sq mi)
- Demonym: Vendarguois
- Time zone: UTC+01:00 (CET)
  - Summer (DST): UTC+02:00 (CEST)
- INSEE/Postal code: 34327 /34740
- Website: www.vendargues.fr
- ^{1} French Land Register data, which excludes lakes, ponds, glaciers > 1 km^{2} (0.386 sq mi or 247 acres) and river estuaries.

Vendargues (French pronunciation: [vɑ̃daʁɡ]) is a commune in the Hérault department in the Occitanie region in southern France.

Since 2006, Vendargues has been twinned with Clackmannanshire, Scotland.

== Population ==
Historical population
| Year | Pop. | ±% p.a. |
|---|---|---|
| 1968 | 1,411 | — |
| 1975 | 1,871 | +4.11% |
| 1982 | 2,601 | +4.82% |
| 1990 | 4,257 | +6.35% |
| 1999 | 5,228 | +2.31% |
| 2007 | 5,462 | +0.55% |
| 2012 | 5,987 | +1.85% |
| 2017 | 6,232 | +0.81% |
| 2023 | 7,262 | +2.58% |
Source: INSEE

== See also ==
- Communes of the Hérault department
