= Lauren Wells (footballer) =

Welsh footballer (born 1988)

Personal information
- Full name: Lauren Wells
- Date of birth: 3 July 1988 (age 38)
- Place of birth: Reading, Berkshire, England
- Position: Goalkeeper

Team information
- Current team: Bristol Ladies Union
- Number: 1

Youth career
- 1998–2004: Reading

Senior career*
Years	Team	Apps	(Gls)
2004–2006	Arsenal		
2006	Cardiff City		
2006–2009	Team Bath		
2009–2010	Bristol Academy		
2011–2012	Gloucester City		
2012–	Bristol Ladies Union		

International career^{‡}
2004–	Wales	3	(0)
- * Club domestic league appearances and goals ‡ National team caps and goals as of 1 October 2010

Lauren Wells (born 3 July 1988) is a football goalkeeper from Reading who plays for the Welsh national team and Bristol Ladies Union.

== Club career ==
Wells joined her local club Reading Royals aged ten. At 16 she moved on to Arsenal and spent two years studying at the academy and featuring for the first team as Emma Byrne's back-up. Wells moved away to the University of Bath in 2006 and began playing for Cardiff City. Despite playing for Cardiff in the UEFA Women's Cup, Wells moved on to Bristol City Ladies after three months, in search of first-team football. Bristol City came under the auspices of Team Bath in 2007 and Wells continued as the number one goalkeeper at the club.

With the demise of Team Bath, Wells joined Bristol Academy in 2009, making her debut against Birmingham City.

In 2011–12 Wells turned out for South West Combination Women's Football League outfit Gloucester City. In summer 2012 Wells signed for Bristol Ladies Union FC, playing under Head Coach Rich Sears.

== International career ==
Wells represented England at U17 level, but switched her allegiance to Wales and won 11 caps for the U19 team.

She was called into the Wales senior squad in March 2004 for that year's Algarve Cup while still a 15-year-old schoolgirl player with Reading. She made her international debut against Finland in a 4–0 defeat on 20 March 2004.

Wells also represented Great Britain at the World University Games, playing in the 2009 tournament in Belgrade and winning a bronze medal.
