= Karl-Liebknecht-Stadion =

Football stadium in Potsdam, Germany

Coordinates: 52°23′56.7″N 13°5′41.3″E

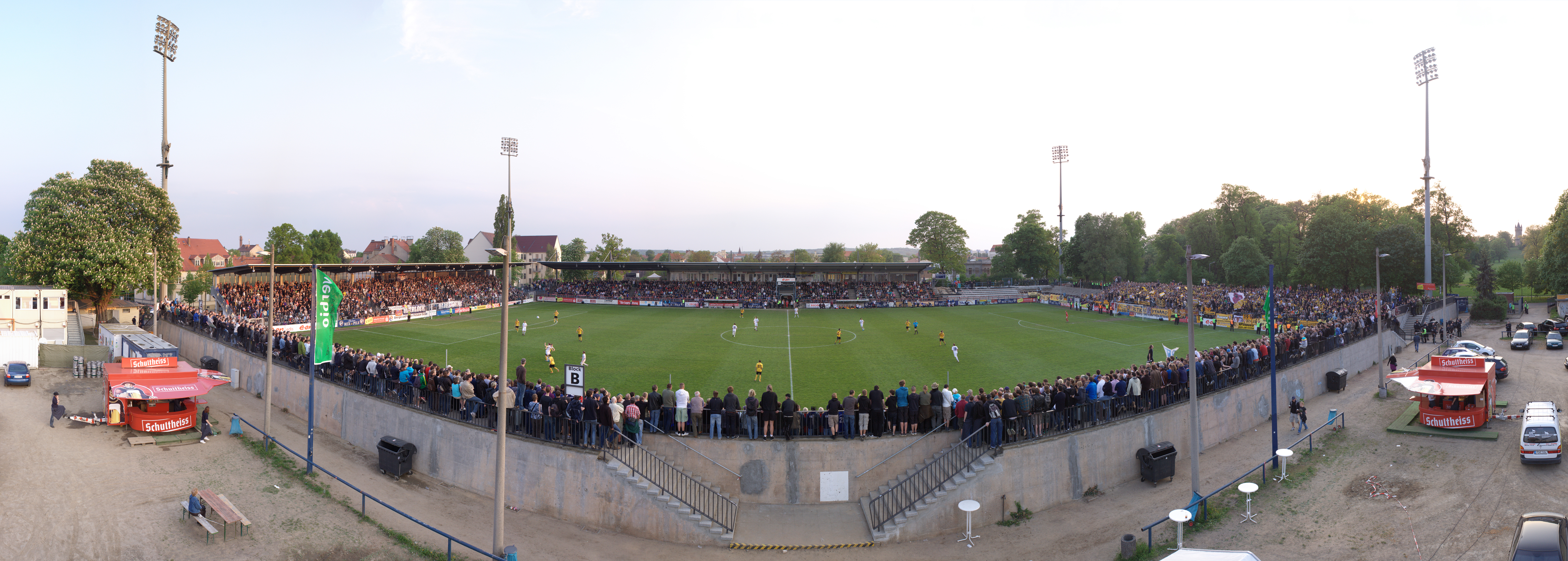
- Karl-Liebknecht-Stadion in April 2011
- Interactive map of Karl-Liebknecht-Stadion
- Former names: Sportplatz an der Priesterstraße
- Location: Potsdam, Germany
- Operator: City of Potsdam
- Capacity: 10,787
- Surface: Grass

Construction
- Opened: 10 July 1976
- Renovated: 2002
- Expanded: 2010

Tenants
- 1. FFC Turbine Potsdam; SV Babelsberg 03

The Karl-Liebknecht-Stadion is a football stadium in Potsdam-Babelsberg, Germany. It is the home stadium of 1. FFC Turbine Potsdam and SV Babelsberg 03. The stadium has a capacity of 10,787 for 8,784 standing and 2,003 seated guests. Named in honor of Karl Liebknecht, the Communist Party of Germany leader who was assassinated by a Freikorps in January 1919.

== History ==
The stadium was opened on 10 July 1976 with a football match between BSG Motor Babelsberg and the Olympic team of the German Democratic Republic where Team GDR won, 5–0. The original capacity of 15,000 was reached only once as the East Germany national football team faced Malta. On 9 July 2001, the SV Babelsberg 03 had its highest attendance in their club history when 14,700 spectators witnessed Babelsberg's win over Fortuna Düsseldorf.

The last renovation was held in 2002, and the stadium now has its current capacity. About one year later, the Women's Bundesliga match between 1. FFC Turbine Potsdam and 1. FFC Frankfurt was seen by 7,900 people. This was the women's Bundesliga match with the highest ever attendance. Turbine's all-time attendance record occurred on 21 May 2005, when 8,677 people came to the Karl-Liebknecht-Stadion to watch the UEFA Women's Cup Final second leg against between 1. FFC Turbine Potsdam and Djurgårdens IF.
