= 2001–02 Arsenal L.F.C. season =

English women's football club season

Arsenal Ladies
2001–02 season
- Chairman: Peter Hill-Wood
- Manager: Vic Akers
- Stadium: Meadow Park
- Premier League: Winners
- FA Cup: Quarter Finals
- Premier League Cup: Semi Finals
- UEFA Cup: Quarter finals
- Charity Shield: Winners
- London County Cup: Runners Up
- Top goalscorer: League: Marianne Spacey: (16); All: Marianne Spacey: (26)
- Biggest win: 10–2 (vs Leeds United (H), Premier League, 11 May 2002)
- Biggest defeat: 0–4 (vs Doncaster Rovers Belles (A), Premier League, 11 April 2002)
Home colours	Away colours	Third colours

The 2001–02 season was Arsenal Ladies Football Club's 15th season since forming in 1987. The club participated in the National Division of the FA Women's Premier League, retaining their title from the previous season. They defeated Doncaster Rovers Belles 5–2 to clinch the Charity Shield. They also competed in the FA Cup and Premier League Cup, but were knocked out by Doncaster Rovers Belles and Fulham respectively. Fulham also beat Arsenal in the Final on the London County Cup. Arsenal played in the first edition of the UEFA Women's Cup, but were knocked out at the Quarter Final stage by Toulouse.

== Squad information & statistics ==
=== First team squad ===
Squad statistics correct as of May 2002

Name	Date of birth (age)	Since	Signed from
Goalkeepers
(Republic of Ireland) Emma Byrne	14 June 1979 (aged 23)	2000	(Denmark) Fortuna Hjørring
(England) Jasmine Cripps	4 November 1985 (aged 16)	1998	(England) Arsenal Academy
(England) Aman Dosanj	9 September 1983 (aged 18)	1999	(England) Southampton Saints
(Wales) Jo Price	7 June 1985 (aged 17)	2001	(England) Arsenal Academy
(England) Toni-Anne Wayne	8 May 1983 (aged 19)	2000	(England) Arsenal Academy
Defenders
(England) Kirsty Pealling	14 April 1975 (aged 27)	1987	(England) Arsenal Academy
(Scotland) Pauline MacDonald	17 April 1975 (aged 27)	1999	(Scotland) Cumbernauld United
(England) Leanne Champ	10 August 1983 (aged 18)	2001	(England) Millwall Lionesses
(England) Faye White	2 February 1978 (aged 24)	1996	(England) Three Bridges
(England) Clare Wheatley	4 February 1971 (aged 31)	1995	(England) Chelsea
(England) Julie Fletcher	28 September 1974 (aged 27)	2001	(England) Charlton Athletic
(Republic of Ireland) Yvonne Tracy	27 February 1982 (aged 20)	2000	(Republic of Ireland) St Patrick's Athletic
(England) Anita Asante	27 April 1985 (aged 17)	1998	(England) Arsenal Academy
(England) Georgie Adams	7 November 1984 (aged 17)	1999	(England) Bushey
(England) Carol Harwood	1 December 1965 (aged 36)	2002	(England) Southampton Saints
(Saint Lucia) Eartha Pond	4 September 1983 (aged 18)	2002	(England) Chelsea
(England) Casey Stoney	13 May 1982 (aged 20)	1999	(England) Chelsea
(England) Sarah Woolliscroft	24 December 1974 (aged 27)	1999	(England) Ilkeston Town
(England) Kelley Few	17 October 1971 (aged 30)	1991	(England) Romford
(England) Jessica Wright	11 September 1983 (aged 18)	2001	(England) Berkhamsted Town
Midfielders
(Wales) Jayne Ludlow	7 January 1979 (aged 23)	2000	(England) Southampton Saints
(England) Sian Williams (c)	2 February 1968 (aged 34)	1990	(England) Millwall Lionesses
(Republic of Ireland) Ciara Grant	17 May 1978 (aged 24)	1998	(Republic of Ireland) St Patrick's Athletic
(England) Emma Thomas	17 October 1983 (aged 18)	1996	(England) Arsenal Academy
(Scotland) Nicky Grant	13 August 1976 (aged 25)	2001	(Iceland) ÍBV
(England) Emma Coss	9 May 1979 (aged 23)	1992	(England) Arsenal Academy
(Republic of Ireland) Carol Conlon	9 January 1979 (aged 21)	1998	(Republic of Ireland) St Patrick's Athletic
(Northern Ireland) Alana Livingstone	4 November 1985 (aged 16)	2001	(England) Arsenal Academy
(England) Alex Cottier	6 December 1973 (aged 28)	2001	(England) Southampton Saints
(England) Leanne Small	29 September 1982 (aged 18)	2000	(England) Watford
(England) Jo Gardiner		1999	(England) Arsenal Academy
Forwards
(England) Angela Banks	23 December 1975 (aged 26)	1999	(England) Whitehawk
(England) Ellen Maggs	16 February 1983 (aged 19)	1997	(England) Arsenal Academy
(England) Alex Scott	14 October 1984 (aged 17)	2000	(England) Arsenal Academy
(England) Marieanne Spacey	13 February 1966 (aged 36)	1993	(England) Wimbledon
(England) Sheuneen Ta	21 July 1985 (aged 16)	1997	(England) Arsenal Academy
(England) Emma Moore	15 July 1980 (aged 21)	2001	(England) Charlton Athletic
(England) Mikaela Howell	12 July 1988 (aged 13)	1999	(England) Southampton Women
(Japan) Megumi Ogawa	18 March 1980 (aged 22)	2000	(England) Arsenal Academy
Unknown
(Japan) Momo Nakaike		2001	(England) Arsenal Academy

=== Appearances and goals ===
Name	PLND		FA Cup		PL Cup		LC Cup		Charity Shield		UEFA Cup		Total	
Name	Apps	Goals	Apps	Goals	Apps	Goals	Apps	Goals	Apps	Goals	Apps	Goals	Apps	Goals
Goalkeepers
(Republic of Ireland) Emma Byrne	18	0	3	0	4	0	1	0	1	0	5	0	32	0
(Wales) Jo Price	0	0	0	0	0	0	1	0	0	0	0	0	1	0
(England) Jasmine Cripps	0	0	0	0	0	0	0	0	0	0	0	0	0	0
(England) Toni-Anne Wayne	0	0	0	0	0+1	0	1	0	0+1	0	0	0	1+2	0
(England) Aman Dosanj	0	0	0	0	0	0	0	0	0	0	0	0	0	0
Defenders
(England) Kirsty Pealling	11+1	0	3	1	3	0	1	0	1	0	4	0	23+1	1
(Scotland) Pauline MacDonald	18	3	3	0	4	0	2	0	1	0	4	0	32	3
(England) Leanne Champ	17+1	0	3	0	3	0	1	0	0+1	0	5	0	29+2	0
(England) Faye White	17	5	2	0	3	1	1	0	1	0	5	1	29	7
(England) Clare Wheatley	4+5	0	0	0	0	0	0+1	0	1	0	0+1	0	5+7	0
(England) Julie Fletcher	7+2	0	0+2	0	0	0	1	1	0	0	1+1	0	9+5	1
(Republic of Ireland) Yvonne Tracy	7+3	0	0	0	3	0	1	0	0+1	0	1+3	0	12+7	0
(England) Anita Asante	0	0	0	0	0	0	0+1	0	0	0	0	0	0+1	0
(England) Georgie Adams	0	0	0	0	0	0	0	0	0	0	0	0	0	0
(England) Carol Harwood	0	0	0	0	0	0	0	0	0	0	0	0	0	0
(Saint Lucia) Eartha Pond	0	0	0	0	0	0	2	2	0	0	0	0	2	2
(England) Kelley Few	0	0	0+1	0	0	0	1	0	0	0	0	0	1+1	0
(England) Casey Stoney	12+2	3	1+2	0	2+1	1	1	0	1	0	5	0	22+5	4
(England) Sarah Woolliscroft	0	0	0	0	0+1	0	0	0	0	0	0+1	0	0+2	0
(England) Jessica Wright	0+1	0	0	0	1+1	0	0	0	0	0	0	0	1+2	0
Midfielders
(Wales) Jayne Ludlow	15+1	13	3	3	2	1	0	0	1	2	5	4	26+1	23
(England) Sian Williams (c)	15	0	3	0	2	0	1	0	1	0	4	0	26	0
(Republic of Ireland) Ciara Grant	13+1	5	3	2	4	5	1	0	1	1	5	3	27+1	16
(England) Emma Thomas	0	0	0	0	0	0	0	0	0	0	0	0	0	0
(Scotland) Nicky Grant	5+1	0	3	0	3	0	0	0	0	0	0	0	11+1	0
(England) Emma Coss	1+4	0	0+1	0	1+3	0	1	1	0	0	1+1	0	4+9	1
(Republic of Ireland) Carol Conlon	0	0	0	0	0	0	0	0	0	0	0	0	0	0
(Northern Ireland) Alana Livingstone	0	0	0	0	0	0	0	0	0	0	0	0	0	0
(England) Alex Cottier	0	0	0	0	0	0	0	0	0	0	0	0	0	0
(England) Jo Gardiner	0	0	0	0	0	0	1	0	0	0	0	0	1	0
Forwards
(England) Angela Banks	14+2	10	3	1	3+1	5	0	0	1	1	4	3	25+2	20
(England) Ellen Maggs	6+10	5	0+3	1	2+1	3	1	0	0+1	0	1+3	1	10+18	10
(England) Alex Scott	0+1	0	0	0	0	0	0+1	0	0	0	0	0	0+2	0
(Japan) Megumi Ogawa	0+4	0	0	0	0+2	1	1+1	1	0	0	0+2	1	1+9	3
(England) Marieanne Spacey	18	16	3	2	4	5	1	1	1	1	5	1	32	26
(England) Emma Moore	0+3	0	0	0	0+1	0	2	0	0+1	0	0+1	1	2+6	1
(England) Sheuneen Ta	0	0	0	0	0	0	0	0	0	0	0	0	0	0
(England) Mikaela Howell	0	0	0	0	0	0	0	0	0	0	0	0	0	0
Unknown
(Japan) Momo Nakaike	0	0	0	0	0	0	0	0	0	0	0	0	0	0

=== Goalscorers ===
Rank	Position	Name	PLND	FA Cup	PL Cup	LC Cup	Comm Shield	UEFA Cup	Total
1	FW	(England) Marieanne Spacey	16	2	5	1	1	1	26
2	MF	(Wales) Jayne Ludlow	13	3	1	0	2	4	23
3	FW	(England) Angela Banks	10	1	5	0	1	3	20
4	MF	(Republic of Ireland) Ciara Grant	5	2	5	0	1	3	16
5	FW	(England) Ellen Maggs	5	1	3	0	0	1	10
6	DF	(England) Faye White	5	0	1	0	0	1	7
7	DF	(England) Casey Stoney	3	0	1	0	0	0	4
8	FW	(Japan) Megumi Ogawa	0	0	1	1	0	1	3
8	DF	(Scotland) Pauline MacDonald	3	0	0	0	0	0	3
10	DF	(Saint Lucia) Eartha Pond	0	0	0	2	0	0	2
11	FW	(England) Emma Moore	0	0	0	0	0	1	1
11	MF	(England) Emma Coss	0	0	0	1	0	0	1
11	DF	(England) Julie Fletcher	0	0	0	1	0	0	1
11	DF	(England) Kirsty Pealling	0	1	0	0	0	0	1
Total			60	10	22	6	5	15	118

=== Clean sheets ===
Rank	Name	PLND	FA Cup	PL Cup	LC Cup	Charity Shield	UEFA Cup	Total
1	(Republic of Ireland) Emma Byrne	9	2	1	1	0	2	15
2	(Wales) Jo Price	0	0	0	0	0	0	0
2	(England) Toni-Anne Wayne	0	0	0	0	0	0	0
Total		9	2	1	1	0	2	15

== Transfers, loans and other signings ==
=== Transfers in ===
Announcement date	Position	Player	From club
2001	FW	(England) Emma Moore	(England) Charlton Athletic
2001	DF	(England) Leanne Champ	(England) Millwall Lionesses
2001	DF	(England) Jessica Wright	(England) Berkhamsted Town
2001	MF	(England) Alex Cottier	(England) Southampton Saints
2001	DF	(England) Julie Fletcher	(England) Charlton Athletic
2001	MF	(Scotland) Nicky Grant	(Iceland) ÍBV
2002	DF	(Saint Lucia) Eartha Pond	(England) Charlton Athletic
2002	DF	(England) Carol Harwood	(England) Southampton Saints

=== Transfers out ===
Announcement date	Position	Player	To club
2001	FW	(England) Nina Downham	(England) Charlton Athletic
2001	DF	(Republic of Ireland) Susan Heaps	(Republic of Ireland) St Catherine's
2001	DF	(England) Carol Harwood	(England) Southampton Saints
2001	FW	(Republic of Ireland) Grainne Kierans	(England) Charlton Athletic
2001	GK	(England) Lesley Higgs	Retired
2001	MF	(Republic of Ireland) Caroline Thorpe	(Republic of Ireland) St Catherine's
2001	DF	(England) Jenny Canty	
2001	MF	(Scotland) Holly Roberts	
2002	DF	(England) Sarah Woolliscroft	(England) Birmingham City
2002	MF	(England) Alex Cottier	(England) Southampton Saints

=== Loans out ===
Announcement date	Position	Player	To club
2001	GK	(England) Toni-Anne Wayne	(England) Barnet

== Club ==
=== Kit ===
Supplier: Nike / Sponsor: Dreamcast / Sega

Home	Away	Third

== Competitions ==
=== Overall record ===
Competition	First match	Last match	Starting round	Final position	Record							
Competition	First match	Last match	Starting round	Final position	Pld	W	D	L	GF	GA	GD	Win %
FA Women's Premier League National Division	19 August 2001	11 May 2002	Matchday 1	Winners	18	16	1	1	60	15	+45	88.89
FA Women's Cup	13 January 2002	17 February 2002	Fourth round	Quarter-finals	3	2	0	1	11	2	+9	66.67
FA Women's Premier League Cup	23 September 2001	16 January 2002	First round	Semi-finals	4	3	0	1	22	6	+16	75.00
UEFA Women's Cup	1 October 2001		Second qualifying round	Quarter-finals	5	3	1	1	15	4	+11	60.00
FA Women's Charity Shield	11 August 2001		Final	Winners	1	1	0	0	5	2	+3	100.00
London County Cup	18 November 2001	17 April 2002	Quarter-finals	Runners-up	3	2	0	1	6	5	+1	66.67
Total					34	27	2	5	119	34	+85	79.41

Last updated: 24 May 2026
Source: FA WPL

=== FA Women's Charity Shield ===
11 August 2001 Final	Arsenal	5–2	Doncaster Belles	Kingston upon Thames
	C. Grant 5'; Ludlow 12', 71'; Spacey 20' (penalty missed) 45; Banks 90'	Report	Garside 6'; Hall (yellow card) 45'; Walker 49'	Stadium: Kingsmeadow; Attendance: 1,103; Referee: Janie Frampton

=== FA Women's Premier League National Division ===
==== Partial league table ====
Pos	Team	Pld	W	D	L	GF	GA	GD	Pts	Qualification or relegation
1	Arsenal (C)	18	16	1	1	60	15	+45	49	Qualification for the UEFA Cup qualifying round
2	Doncaster Belles	18	13	2	3	57	21	+36	41	
3	Charlton Athletic	18	10	1	7	40	24	+16	31	
4	Leeds United	18	7	5	6	36	37	−1	26	
5	Everton	18	8	2	8	30	31	−1	26	

Source: FA WPL
(C) Champions

==== Results summary ====
Overall								Home						Away					
Pld	W	D	L	GF	GA	GD	Pts	W	D	L	GF	GA	GD	W	D	L	GF	GA	GD
18	16	1	1	60	15	+45	49	9	0	0	39	8	+31	7	1	1	21	7	+14

==== Results by matchday ====
Matchday	1	2	3	4	5	6	7	8	9	10	11	12	13	14	15	16	17	18
Ground	A	H	H	H	A	A	H	A	H	H	H	A	A	A	A	H	A	H
Result	W	W	W	W	W	W	W	W	W	W	W	D	W	L	W	W	W	W
Position	1	1	1	1	2	3	1	1	1	1	1	1	1	1	1	1	1	1

Source: FA WPL
W = Win; D = Draw; L = Loss

==== Matches ====
19 August 2001 1	Leeds United	2–5	Arsenal	Leeds
14:00 BST	Kelly 10'; Skillcorn 40'	Report	Spacey 19', 30', 87'; Ludlow 49'; Grant 73'; Stoney (red card) 75'	Stadium: Bracken Edge; Referee: Ian Wright

26 August 2001 2	Arsenal	4–1	Doncaster Belles	Borehamwood
14:00 BST	Spacey 29', 83'; Maggs 62'; Grant 70'; Champ (yellow card)	Report	Exley 32' (yellow card); Walker (yellow card)	Stadium: Meadow Park; Referee: Matthew Izzard

2 September 2001 3	Arsenal	3–1	Southampton Saints	Borehamwood
14:00 BST	Ludlow 28'; White 72'; Maggs 90'	Report	Nwajei 63'	Stadium: Meadow Park; Referee: Sue Robinson

16 September 2001 4	Arsenal	3–1	Charlton Athletic	Borehamwood
12:00 BST	Spacey 10', 78' (pen.); C. Grant 50'	Report	Lorton 44' (pen.) (yellow card)	Stadium: Meadow Park; Referee: C.M. Turner

14 October 2001 5	Sunderland	0–3	Arsenal	Washington
14:00 BST		Report	Banks 15'; Spacey 34' (pen.), 43'	Stadium: Albany Park; Referee: J Benfold

2 December 2001 6	Southampton Saints	0–3	Arsenal	Southampton
14:00 GMT		Report	Banks 20', 78'; Ludlow 36'	Stadium: St Mary's

9 December 2001 7	Arsenal	2–0	Tranmere Rovers	Borehamwood
12:00 GMT	Banks 9', 42'	Report		Stadium: Meadow Park; Referee: Simon Bullock

16 December 2001 8	Everton	0–1	Arsenal	Crosby
12:30 GMT		Report	Ludlow 73'; Champ (yellow card)	Stadium: Rossett Park; Referee: M Highton

20 January 2002 9	Arsenal	4–2	Everton	Borehamwood
12:00 GMT	Spacey 44', 46', 85'; MacDonald 48'	Report	Barr 9'; Whewell 65'	Stadium: Meadow Park

10 March 2002 10	Arsenal	6–0	Barry Town	Borehamwood
14:00 GMT	MacDonald 18'; C. Grant 27'; Stoney 64', 69', 82'; Spacey 85'	Report		Stadium: Meadow Park

13 March 2002 11	Arsenal	3–0	Brighton & Hove Albion	Colney Heath
14:00 GMT	White 40'; Banks; Ludlow	Report		Stadium: Recreation Ground

3 April 2002 12	Brighton & Hove Albion	0–0	Arsenal	Southwick
20:00 BST		Report		Stadium: Old Barn Way

7 April 2002 13	Tranmere Rovers	1–5	Arsenal	Heswall
14:00 BST	Taylor	Report	White 12', 38', 84'; Maggs 20'; Banks 75'	Stadium: Gayton Park; Referee: Ms D. Sudlow (Shrewsbury)

11 April 2002 14	Doncaster Belles	4–0	Arsenal	Woodlands
19:30 BST	Burke 17'; Handley 38'; Walker 45'; Abrahams 57'	Report		Stadium: Welfare Ground

18 April 2002 15	Barry Town	0–1	Arsenal	Barry
19:30 BST		Report	Ludlow 42'	Stadium: Jenner Park Stadium; Referee: Mr Ray Ellingham

21 April 2002 16	Arsenal	4–1	Sunderland	Borehamwood
14:00 BST	Banks 9'; MacDonald 17'; Ludlow 43', 51'	Report	Embleton 48'	Stadium: Meadow Park; Referee: Terry Coates

25 April 2002 17	Charlton Athletic	0–3	Arsenal	Bromley
19:45 BST		Report	Spacey 3', 86'; Banks 26'	Stadium: Hayes Lane

11 May 2002 18	Arsenal	10–2	Leeds United	Highbury
14:00 BST	Spacey 13'; Banks 34'; C. Grant 65'; Ludlow 70', 75', 85', 90', 90+5'; Maggs 80', 90+6'	Report	Daniel 5', 30'	Stadium: Highbury; Attendance: 0
Note: The game was played behind closed doors following the Arsenal Men's match against Everton

=== FA Women's Cup ===
13 January 2002 Fourth round	Loughborough Students	0–7	Arsenal
13:00 GMT		Report	Ludlow 12', 50'; Grant 52', 81'; 60' (o.g.); Spacey 76'; Maggs 81'

3 February 2002 Fifth round	Arsenal	3–0	Leeds United	Borehamwood
	Pealing 38'; Banks 44'; Ludlow 80'	Report		Stadium: Meadow Park

17 February 2002 Quarter-finals	Doncaster Belles	2–1	Arsenal	Doncaster
	Handley 17'; Burke 30'	Report	Spacey 53'	Stadium: Belle Vue Stadium; Referee: J Drew (Lincolnshire)

=== FA Women's Premier League Cup ===
23 September 2001 First round	Arsenal	8–0	Ipswich Town	Borehamwood
14:00 BST	Ludlow 16'; Grant 42', 59'; Spacey 44', 57'; Banks 70', 75', 88'	Report		Stadium: Meadow Park; Referee: Mr Savill

28 October 2001 Second round	Arsenal	8–1	Sunderland	Borehamwood
14:00 BST	White 33'; Maggs 44', 63', 81'; Spacey 53', 71'; Stoney 62'; Ogawa 76'	Report	Lanaghan 67'	Stadium: Meadow Park

11 November 2001 Quarter-finals	Barry Town	2–4	Arsenal	Barry
	Jones 54'; Saunders 80'	Report	Banks 8', 38'; C. Grant 23', 45'	Stadium: Jenner Park Stadium

16 January 2002 Semi-finals	Fulham	3–2 (a.e.t.)	Arsenal	Woking
19:45 GMT	Yankey 43'; Duncan 62'; Jerray-Silver (yellow card) 73'; Pettersen 91'	Report	C. Grant 26'; Spacey (yellow card) 61' (goal) 82'	Stadium: Kingfield Stadium; Attendance: 1,391

=== London County Cup ===
18 November 2001 Quarter-finals	Wimbledon	1–5	Arsenal	Kingston Upon Thames
	Goal	Report	Coss; Pond; Spacey; Ogawa	Stadium: Kingsmeadow

31 January 2002 Semi-finals	Arsenal	1–0	Charlton Athletic	Potters Bar
19:45 GMT	Fletcher	Report		Stadium: The Lantern Stadium; Referee: Mr G Pope

17 April 2002 Final	Arsenal	0–4	Fulham	East Dulwich
		Report	Moore; Pettersen; Mork	Stadium: Champion Hill

=== UEFA Women's Cup ===
==== Second qualifying round ====
Pos	Team	Pld	W	D	L	GF	GA	GD	Pts	Qualification	ARS	BER	WRO	HTA
1	(England) Arsenal	3	3	0	0	13	1	+12	9	Advance to quarter-finals	—	4–0	–	7–0
2	(Switzerland) Bern (H)	3	2	0	1	10	5	+5	6		–	—	3–1	7–0
3	(Poland) AZS Wrocław	3	1	0	2	9	5	+4	3		1–2	–	—	–
4	(Israel) Hapoel Tel Aviv	3	0	0	3	0	21	−21	0		–	–	0–7	—

Source: RSSSF
(H) Hosts

1 October 2001 1	Arsenal (England)	4–0	(Switzerland) Bern	Bern
	Banks 45', 59'; Spacey (yellow card) 57'; Ludlow 70'; C. Grant 77'	Report		Stadium: Stadion Neufeld

3 October 2001 2	Arsenal (England)	7–0	(Israel) Hapoel Tel Aviv	Bern
	Ludlow 5', 9', 53'; C. Grant 10'; Coss 77'; Ogawa 78'; Moore 88'	Report		Stadium: Stadion Neufeld; Attendance: 80

5 October 2001 3	AZS Wrocław (Poland)	1–2	(England) Arsenal	Bern
	Otrebska 1'; Rogacka (yellow card) 15'; Okrasa (yellow card) 66'	Report	Spacey (yellow card) 54' (goal) 77' (pen.); Champ (yellow card) 56'; White (yellow card) 62'; Banks 74'	Stadium: Stadion Neufeld

==== Knockout phase ====
===== Quarter-finals =====
16 March 2002 First leg	Arsenal (England)	1–1	(France) Toulouse	Borehamwood
	C. Grant 37'; Spacey (yellow card) 81'	Report	Rouquet 77'	Stadium: Meadow Park; Attendance: 1,695

30 March 2002 Second leg	Toulouse (France)	2–1 (a.e.t.) (3–2 agg.)	(England) Arsenal	Toulouse
	Woock (yellow card) 70'; Bonnet 79'; Blouin (yellow card) (yellow-red card) 80'; Rouquet (yellow card) 102'; Kramo 115'	Report	Stoney (yellow card) 56'; Champ (yellow card) (yellow-red card) 76'; Maggs 90'	Stadium: Stade des Sept-Deniers; Attendance: 3,628

== See also ==
- List of Arsenal W.F.C. seasons
- 2001–02 in English football
