= 2001–02 UEFA Women's Cup qualifying round =

Tournament details
- Dates: 14 August–6 November 2001
- Teams: 33

The 2001–02 UEFA Women's Champions League qualifying round was played between 29 August and 29 September 2002. A total of 33 teams competed in the qualifying round to decide the 8 places in the knockout phase of the 2001–02 UEFA Women's Cup.

== First qualifying round ==
Team 1	Agg.	Team 2	1st leg	2nd leg
Codru Chişinău (Moldova)	18–0	(Slovenia) Ilirija	9–0	9–0

14 August 2001

Codru Chişinău (Moldova)	9–0	(Slovenia) Ilirija
Enache 2', 23', 36' (pen.), 72'; Frishko 14', 90+2'; Toma 26'; Berinczan 66'; Deliu 77'	Report

Republican Stadium, Chișinău

30 August 2001

Ilirija (Slovenia)	0–9	(Moldova) Codru Chişinău
	Report	Subotič 19' (o.g.); Enache 32', 40', 56' (pen.), 69', 80', 90'; Tytova 44'; Deliu 58'

Ilirija Sports Park, Ljubljana

== Second qualifying round ==
=== Group 1 ===
Pos	Team	Pld	W	D	L	GF	GA	GD	Pts	Qualification	ØRN	BOB	EEN	KR
1	(Norway) Trondheims-Ørn (H)	3	3	0	0	23	1	+22	9	Advance to quarter-finals	—	6–1	–	9–0
2	(Belarus) Bobruichanka Bobruisk	3	2	0	1	8	8	0	6		–	—	4–1	–
3	(Belgium) Eendracht Aalst	3	1	0	2	5	15	−10	3		0–8	–	—	–
4	(Iceland) KR	3	0	0	3	4	16	−12	0		–	1–3	3–4	—

Source: RSSSF
(H) Hosts
20 September 2001

Trondheims-Ørn (Norway)	9–0	(Iceland) KR
Sandaune 11', 18'; Gulbrandsen 42'; Jordanger 51'; Pedersen 63', 78', 81', 90'; Lie 86'	Report

Øverlands Minde, Stjørdal
Attendance: 535
20 September 2001

Bobruichanka Bobruisk (Belarus)	4–1	(Belgium) Eendracht Aalst
Kuzniatsova 14', 71'; Novikova 24'; Aniskovtseva 76'	Report	Heyrmann 85'

Øverlands Minde, Stjørdal
Attendance: 350

22 September 2001

Trondheims-Ørn (Norway)	6–1	(Belarus) Bobruichanka Bobruisk
Rønning 17', 81'; Gulbrandsen 20'; Lie 45'; Enlid 74', 88'	Report	Ryzhevich 16'

Lerkendal Stadion, Trondheim
Attendance: 902
22 September 2001

KR (Iceland)	3–4	(Belgium) Eendracht Aalst
Jóhannesdóttir 17', 25', 63'	Report	Manghi 10' (o.g.); Maes 41', 57'; Heirbaut 88'

Rosenborgbanen, Trondheim
Attendance: 50

24 September 2001

Eendracht Aalst (Belgium)	0–8	(Norway) Trondheims-Ørn
	Report	Rønning 17'; Jordanger 22'; Gulbrandsen 49', 58', 74'; Lehn 60'; Sandaune 70', 78'

Rosenborgbanen, Trondheim
Attendance: 407
24 September 2001

KR (Iceland)	1–3	(Belarus) Bobruichanka Bobruisk
Kristjánsdottir 90'	Report	Ryzhevich 44', 53', 87'

Dalgård Stadion, Trondheim
Attendance: 50

=== Group 2 ===
Pos	Team	Pld	W	D	L	GF	GA	GD	Pts	Qualification	RYA	TLE	KAV	ŽIL
1	(Russia) Ryazan (H)	3	3	0	0	28	0	+28	9	Advance to quarter-finals	—	4–0	11–0	–
2	(Netherlands) Ter Leede	3	2	0	1	9	4	+5	6		–	—	8–0	1–0
3	(Greece) Kavala	3	1	0	2	2	20	−18	3		–	–	—	2–11
4	(Slovakia) Žilina	3	0	0	3	1	16	−15	0		0–13	–	–	—

Source: RSSSF
(H) Hosts
18 September 2001

Ryazan (Russia)	4–0	(Netherlands) Ter Leede
Letyushova 2', 72'; Barbashina 13'; Pustovoitova 89'	Report

Roodemolen, Sassenheim
Attendance: 250
18 September 2001

Kavala (Greece)	2–1	(Slovakia) Žilina
Michailidu 48'; Pouridou 73'	Report	Kubanová 67'

Roodemolen, Sassenheim
Attendance: 100

20 September 2001

Ter Leede (Netherlands)	1–0	(Slovakia) Žilina
Dijkhuizen 6'	Report

Roodemolen, Sassenheim
Attendance: 100
20 September 2001

Ryazan (Russia)	11–0	(Greece) Kavala
Zinchenko 8', 25', 45'; Barbashina 26', 38', 41', 61'; Letyushova 40', 55'; Yushkevich 82'; Verezubova 85'	Report

Roodemolen, Sassenheim
Attendance: 20

22 September 2001

Ter Leede (Netherlands)	8–0	(Greece) Kavala
Drommel 25'; Noom 43', 77', 90'; Blankespoor 53', 55'; Burger 58'; Dijkhuizen 88'	Report

Roodemolen, Sassenheim
Attendance: 350
22 September 2001

Žilina (Slovakia)	0–13	(Russia) Ryazan
	Report	Letyushova 9', 29', 31', 64'; Barbashina 13', 17', 42'; Verezubova 36'; Pustovoitova 51', 62', 82'; Yaraikina 74'; Kolomiets 89'

Roodemolen, Sassenheim
Attendance: 20

=== Group 3 ===
Pos	Team	Pld	W	D	L	GF	GA	GD	Pts	Qualification	UME	SPR	FEM	GHV
1	(Sweden) Umeå (H)	3	3	0	0	10	0	+10	9	Advance to quarter-finals	—	1–0	–	3–0
2	(Czech Republic) Sparta Prague	3	2	0	1	8	1	+7	6		–	—	1–0	7–0
3	(Hungary) Femina Budapest	3	1	0	2	4	7	−3	3		0–6	–	—	–
4	(Bulgaria) Grand Hotel Varna	3	0	0	3	0	14	−14	0		–	–	0–4	—

Source: RSSSF
(H) Hosts
3 October 2001

Umeå (Sweden)	1–0	(Czech Republic) Sparta Prague
Sjöström 67'	Report

Gammliavallen, Umeå
Attendance: 1,486
3 October 2001

Grand Hotel Varna (Bulgaria)	0–4	(Hungary) Femina
	Report	Sebestyén 43'; Ferenczi 83', 90'; Pádár 90+5'

Gammliavallen, Umeå

5 October 2001

Umeå (Sweden)	3–0	(Bulgaria) Grand Hotel Varna
Nordlund 4'; Nordbrandt 6'; Eriksson 45'	Report

Gammliavallen, Umeå
Attendance: 976
5 October 2001

Sparta Prague (Czech Republic)	1–0	(Hungary) Femina
Macková 8'	Report

Gammliavallen, Umeå

7 October 2001

Femina (Hungary)	0–6	(Sweden) Umeå
	Report	Göras 13'; Sjöström 16', 60'; Nordbrandt 30', 58'; Lindqvist 70'

Gammliavallen, Umeå
Attendance: 1,114
7 October 2001

Sparta Prague (Czech Republic)	7–0	(Bulgaria) Grand Hotel Varna
Chlumecká 17', 25', 29', 59'; Mazlová 39'; Poincová 51', 70'	Report

Tegstunet, Umeå

=== Group 4 ===
Pos	Team	Pld	W	D	L	GF	GA	GD	Pts	Qualification	FRA	LEV	CCH	TER
1	(Germany) Frankfurt (H)	3	3	0	0	24	0	+24	9	Advance to quarter-finals	—	1–0	5–0	–
2	(Spain) Levante	3	2	0	1	20	2	+18	6		–	—	3–1	17–0
3	(Moldova) Codru Chişinău	3	1	0	2	10	8	+2	3		–	–	—	9–0
4	(Armenia) CSC Yerevan	3	0	0	3	0	44	−44	0		0–18	–	–	—

Source: RSSSF
(H) Hosts
3 October 2001

Frankfurt (Germany)	1–0	(Spain) Levante
Wunderlich 67'	Report

Stadion am Brentanobad, Frankfurt
Attendance: 1,200
3 October 2001

Codru Chişinău (Moldova)	9–0	(Armenia) CSC Yerevan
Pufulete 4', 5', 39'; Enache 32', 56'; Berinczan 49'; Laslo 61'; Deliu 65'; Golovko 83'	Report

Stadion am Brentanobad, Frankfurt

5 October 2001

Frankfurt (Germany)	5–0	(Moldova) Codru Chişinău
Künzer 5'; Lingor 45'; Hansen 56'; Minnert 76'; Meier 86'	Report

Stadion am Brentanobad, Frankfurt
Attendance: 1,000
5 October 2001

Levante (Spain)	17–0	(Armenia) CSC Yerevan
Prieto 2', 12', 38', 61'; Jiménez 7', 43', 52', 72'; Gimbert 35', 45'; R. Castillo 36', 60'; Del Río 39'; Monje 51', 76'; Fuentes 88'; Soler 90'	Report

Stadion am Brentanobad, Frankfurt

7 October 2001

CSC Yerevan (Armenia)	0–18	(Germany) Frankfurt
	Report	Hansen 13'; Jones 21', 26', 33', 61', 63', 64'; Meier 34', 70', 74'; Klein 38', 62', 86'; Haase 47', 78'; Spee 53'; Künzer 81'; Wissink 90'

Stadion am Brentanobad, Frankfurt
7 October 2001

Levante (Spain)	3–1	(Moldova) Codru Chişinău
Gimbert 12'; Soler 33'; Jiménez 43'	Report	Frishko 30'

Stadion am Brentanobad, Frankfurt

=== Group 5 ===
Pos	Team	Pld	W	D	L	GF	GA	GD	Pts	Qualification	HJK	TOR	KIK	LWI
1	(Finland) HJK (H)	3	3	0	0	14	1	+13	9	Advance to quarter-finals	—	–	3–0	8–0
2	(Italy) Torres	3	2	0	1	10	2	+8	6		1–2	—	–	5–0
3	(Faroe Islands) KÍ	3	1	0	2	2	9	−7	3		–	0–4	—	–
4	(Austria) Landhaus Wien	3	0	0	3	1	15	−14	0		–	–	1–2	—

Source: RSSSF
(H) Hosts
3 October 2001

(Italy) Torres	1–2	HJK (Finland)
Parejo 29'	Report	Kalmari 11'; Lindqvist 90'

Töölön Pallokenttä, Helsinki
Attendance: 466
3 October 2001

(Austria) Landhaus Wien	1–2	KÍ (Faroe Islands)
Krivohravek 64'	Report	Andreasen 4', 17'

Töölön Pallokenttä, Helsinki
Attendance: 114

5 October 2001

HJK (Finland)	4–0	(Faroe Islands) KÍ
Heikari 23'; Rantanen 33'; Kalmari 52'; Sarapää 81'	Report

Pohjola Stadion, Helsinki
Attendance: 512
5 October 2001

Torres (Italy)	5–0	(Austria) Landhaus Wien
Conti 3', 45'; Parejo 57', 77'; Masia 90'	Report

Töölön Pallokenttä, Helsinki
Attendance: 78

7 October 2001

HJK (Finland)	8–0	(Austria) Landhaus Wien
Rantanen 3', 38'; Kalmari 9', 79', 90'; Miettinen 11'; Sarapää 54'; Heikari 89'	Report

Pohjola Stadion, Helsinki
Attendance: 496
7 October 2001

(Faroe Islands) KÍ	0–4	Torres (Italy)
	Report	Sberti 3', 20', 45'; Parejo 38'

Töölön Pallokenttä, Helsinki
Attendance: 47

=== Group 6 ===
Pos	Team	Pld	W	D	L	GF	GA	GD	Pts	Qualification	ODE	MCN	GAT	PNI
1	(Denmark) Odense (H)	3	3	0	0	19	1	+18	9	Advance to quarter-finals	—	–	3–0	13–0
2	(Federal Republic of Yugoslavia) Masinac Niš	3	2	0	1	19	4	+15	6		1–3	—	–	–
3	(Portugal) Gatões	3	1	0	2	9	10	−1	3		–	1–7	—	8–0
4	(Luxembourg) Progrès Niedercorn	3	0	0	3	0	32	−32	0		–	0–11	–	—

Source: RSSSF
(H) Hosts
20 September 2001

Odense (Denmark)	3–0	(Portugal) Gatões
Werming 7'; M. Pedersen 45'; Møller 70'	Report

Odense Stadion, Odense
Attendance: 211
20 September 2001

Progrès Niedercorn (Luxembourg)	0–11	(Federal Republic of Yugoslavia) Masinac Niš
	Report	Ranđelović 11', 56'; Ivanović 18'; Mladenović 28'; Todorović 33', 55'; Stefanović 45'; Zukovski 46', 82'; Jovanović 47'; Brimmeyer 59' (o.g.)

Odense Atletik Stadion, Odense
Attendance: 466

22 September 2001

Odense (Denmark)	13–0	(Luxembourg) Progrès Niedercorn
Bülow 6', 59'; Møller 23'; M. Pedersen 34', 69', 75', 79', 84'; Kjær Thomsen 39'; Werming 49', 51'; Jakobsen 71'; Lund 74'	Report

Bolbro GIF, Odense
Attendance: 326
22 September 2001

Gatões (Portugal)	1–7	(Federal Republic of Yugoslavia) Masinac Niš
Paula Cristina 50'	Report	Ribeiro 14' (o.g.); Stojanović 20'; Todorović 47'; Stefanović 70', 82'; Jovanović 85'; Zukovski 88'

Odense Idrætspark, Odense

24 September 2001

Masinac Niš (Federal Republic of Yugoslavia)	1–3	(Denmark) Odense
Todorović 31'	Report	M. Pedersen 5', 20'; Møller 78'

Odense Stadion, Odense
24 September 2001

Gatões (Portugal)	8–0	(Luxembourg) Progrès Niedercorn
S. Silva 1', 59', 72'; Moreira 24'; Paula Cristina 31'; M. Silva 37', 87'; Juchem 69' (o.g.)	Report

Odense Atletik Stadion, Odense

=== Group 7 ===
The tournament was initially planned to take place in Toulouse, but was postponed and relocated to Ayr due to the damage to Stadium de Toulouse caused by the AZF chemical factory explosion.

Pos	Team	Pld	W	D	L	GF	GA	GD	Pts	Qualification	TOU	LSH	AYR	OSI
1	(France) Toulouse	3	2	1	0	9	2	+7	7	Advance to quarter-finals	—	1–0	–	6–0
2	(Ukraine) Lehenda-Cheksil	3	1	1	1	4	4	0	4		–	—	1–1	3–2
3	(Scotland) Ayr United (H)	3	0	3	0	6	6	0	3		2–2	–	—	–
4	(Croatia) Osijek	3	0	1	2	5	12	−7	1		–	–	3–3	—

Source: RSSSF
(H) Hosts
2 November 2001
13:00 (12:00 GMT)

Toulouse (France)	1–0	(Ukraine) Lehenda-Cheksil
Lemeshko 78' (o.g.)	Report

Dam Park, Ayr
Attendance: 35
2 November 2001
20:00 (19:00 GMT)

Osijek (Croatia)	3–3	(Scotland) Ayr United
Kozić 10', 39', 47'	Report	Fleeting 58'; Gilmour 62'; Brolly 74'

Somerset Park, Ayr
Attendance: 173

4 November 2001
13:00 (12:00 GMT)

Toulouse (France)	6–0	(Croatia) Osijek
Rouquet 22', 56', 71'; Pavailler 36'; Kramo 38', 76'	Report

Somerset Park, Ayr
Attendance: 12
4 November 2001
16:30 (15:30 GMT)

Lehenda-Cheksil (Ukraine)	1–1	(Scotland) Ayr United
Zhdanova 82'	Report	Fleeting 61'

Somerset Park, Ayr
Attendance: 271

6 November 2001
20:00 (19:00 GMT)

Ayr United (Scotland)	2–2	(France) Toulouse
Brolly 46', 90'	Report	Samptiaux 9'; Monicolle 43'

Somerset Park, Ayr
Attendance: 168
6 November 2001
20:00 (19:00 GMT)

Lehenda-Cheksil (Ukraine)	3–2	(Croatia) Osijek
Dyatel 40'; Karpenkova 84'; Lemeshko 85'	Report	Besker 8', 80'

Dam Park, Ayr
Attendance: 10

=== Group 8 ===
Pos	Team	Pld	W	D	L	GF	GA	GD	Pts	Qualification	ARS	BER	WRO	HTA
1	(England) Arsenal	3	3	0	0	13	1	+12	9	Advance to quarter-finals	—	4–0	–	7–0
2	(Switzerland) Bern (H)	3	2	0	1	10	5	+5	6		–	—	3–1	7–0
3	(Poland) AZS Wrocław	3	1	0	2	9	5	+4	3		1–2	–	—	–
4	(Israel) Hapoel Tel Aviv	3	0	0	3	0	21	−21	0		–	–	0–7	—

Source: RSSSF
(H) Hosts
1 October 2001

Arsenal (England)	4–0	(Switzerland) Bern
Banks 45', 59'; Ludlow 70'; Grant 77'	Report

Stadion Neufeld, Bern
Attendance: 800
1 October 2001

Hapoel Tel Aviv (Israel)	0–7	(Poland) AZS Wrocław
	Report	Otrębska 5', 16', 35'; Stochay 41', 72'; Pożerska 74'; Kraus 90'

Stadion Neufeld, Bern
Attendance: 70

3 October 2001

Bern (Switzerland)	3–1	(Poland) AZS Wrocław
Gaillard 18'; Theiler 46', 85'	Report	Kraus 81'

Stadion Neufeld, Bern
Attendance: 350
3 October 2001

Arsenal (England)	7–0	(Israel) Hapoel Tel Aviv
Ludlow 5', 9', 53'; Grant 10'; Coss 77'; Ogawa 78'; Moore 88'	Report

Stadion Neufeld, Bern
Attendance: 80

5 October 2001

Bern (Switzerland)	7–0	(Israel) Hapoel Tel Aviv
Vonlanthen 5'; Meyer 12'; Marti 28'; Theiler 42', 72'; Gaillard 59', 75'	Report

Stadion Neufeld, Bern
Attendance: 100
5 October 2001

AZS Wrocław (Poland)	1–2	(England) Arsenal
Otrębska 1'	Report	Banks 74'; Spacey 77'

Stadion Neufeld, Bern
