= French women's football clubs in international competitions =

This is a compilation of results for teams representing France at official international women's football competitions, that is the UEFA Women's Cup and its successor, the UEFA Women's Champions League. France was first represented in them by Toulouse in the inaugural 2001–02.

France is along with Germany one of the two associations that have won the competition in the Champions League era through Olympique Lyonnais with three titles. Paris Saint-Germain has also reached the final. As of the 2016–17 edition France is ranked second at the association rankings with a coefficient of 76,000 and it is thus one of the twelve UEFA members granted two spots in the competition.

== Teams ==
These are the five teams that have represented France in the UEFA Women's Cup and the UEFA Women's Champions League.

Club	Founded	Region	City	Appearances	First	Last	Best result
Juvisy	1971	Île-de-France	Viry-Châtillon	4	2003–04	2012–13	3 / 7 – Semifinalist
Montpellier	1990	(Occitania (administrative region)) Occitanie	Montpellier	3	2004–05	2009–10	3 / 7 – Semifinalist
Olympique Lyonnais	1970	Auvergne-Rhône-Alpes	Lyon	10	2007–08	2016–17	1 / 7 – Champion
Paris Saint-Germain	1991	Île-de-France	Paris	5	2011–12	2016–17	2 / 7 – Finalist
Toulouse	1980	(Occitania (administrative region)) Occitanie	Toulouse	2	2001–02	2002–03	3 / 7 – Semifinalist

Locations of the teams within France

== Qualification ==
Edition	Competition	2nd stage - First	2nd - stage - Second	2nd stage - Third	2nd stage - Fourth	
2001–02 UWC	2000–01 Division 1	Toulouse (13)	La Roche (7)	Juvisy (6)	Lyon (5)	
2002–03 UWC	2001–02 Division 1	Toulouse (14)	Juvisy (12)	Lyon (7)	Montpellier (3)	
2003–04 UWC	2002–03 Division 1	Juvisy (14)	Lyon (9)	Montpellier (7)	Toulouse (6)	
2004–05 UWC	2003–04 Division 1	Montpellier (11)	Lyon (10)	Juvisy (9)	Toulouse (5)	
Edition	Competition	First	Second	Third	Fourth	Fifth
2005–06 UWC	2004–05 Division 1	Montpellier (82)	Juvisy (79)	Lyon (69)	Soyaux (60)	Toulouse (59)
2006–07 UWC	2005–06 Division 1	Juvisy (85)	Montpellier (76)	Olympique Lyonnais (60)	Toulouse (59)	CNFE (56)
2007–08 UWC	2006–07 Division 1	Olympique Lyonnais (83)	Montpellier (76)	Juvisy (75)	Soyaux (60)	CNFE (52)
2008–09 UWC	2007–08 Division 1	Olympique Lyonnais (80)	Juvisy (73)	Montpellier (63)	Saint-Étienne (56)	Paris Saint-Germain (53)
2009–10 UWCL	2008–09 Division 1	Olympique Lyonnais (86)	Montpellier (73)	Juvisy (72)	Hénin-Beaumont (51)	Nord Allier Yzeure (51)
2010–11 UWCL	2009–10 Division 1	Olympique Lyonnais (78)	Juvisy (77)	Paris Saint-Germain (74)	Montpellier (70)	Nord Allier Yzeure (53)
2011–12 UWCL	2010–11 Division 1	Olympique Lyonnais (88)	Paris Saint-Germain (74)	Montpellier (71)	Juvisy (70)	Saint-Étienne (56)
2012–13 UWCL	2011–12 Division 1	Olympique Lyonnais (82)	Juvisy (78)	Montpellier (76)	Paris Saint-Germain (66)	Saint-Étienne (50)
2013–14 UWCL	2012–13 Division 1	Olympique Lyonnais (88)	Paris Saint-Germain (78)	Juvisy (71)	Montpellier (67)	Nord Allier Yzeure (53)
2014–15 UWCL	2013–14 Division 1	Olympique Lyonnais (85)	Paris Saint-Germain (78)	Juvisy (77)	Montpellier (68)	En Avant Guingamp (49)
2015–16 UWCL	2014–15 Division 1	Olympique Lyonnais (88)	Paris Saint-Germain (82)	Juvisy (67)	Montpellier (66)	En Avant Guingamp (64)
2016–17 UWCL	2015–16 Division 1	Olympique Lyonnais (82)	Paris Saint-Germain (79)	Montpellier (71)	Juvisy (70)	Rodez (52)

== Progression by season ==
Season	Teams	Earlier rounds	Round of 32	Round of 16	Quarterfinals	Semifinals	Final
2001–02 UWC	(Occitania (administrative region)) Toulouse		(Ukraine) Lehenda ^{1}	Not held	(England) Arsenal	(Germany) Frankfurt	
2002–03 UWC	(Occitania (administrative region)) Toulouse		(Italy) Lazio ^{1}	Not held	(Sweden) Umeå		
2003–04 UWC	(Île-de-France) Juvisy		(Norway) Kolbotn ^{1}				
2004–05 UWC	(Occitania (administrative region)) Montpellier		(Austria) Neulengbach ^{1}	(Italy) Torres ^{1}			
2005–06 UWC	(Occitania (administrative region)) Montpellier		(Portugal) 1º Dezembro ^{1}	(Netherlands) Saestum ^{1}	(Denmark) Brøndby	(Germany) Frankfurt	
2006–07 UWC	(Île-de-France) Juvisy		(Spain) Espanyol ^{1}				
2007–08 UWC	(Auvergne-Rhône-Alpes) Olympique Lyonnais		(Bosnia and Herzegovina) Sarajevo ^{1}	(Norway) Kolbotn ^{1}	(England) Arsenal	(Sweden) Umeå	
2008–09 UWC	(Auvergne-Rhône-Alpes) Olympique Lyonnais			(Austria) Neulengbach ^{1}	(Italy) Bardolino	(Germany) Duisburg	
2009–10 UWCL	(Auvergne-Rhône-Alpes) Olympique Lyonnais (1st)		(Serbia) Mašinac	(Denmark) Fortuna	(Italy) Torres	(Sweden) Umeå	(Germany) Turbine
2009–10 UWCL	(Occitania (administrative region)) Montpellier (2nd)	(Bulgaria) NSA ^{1}	(Belgium) Standard	(Germany) Bayern	(Sweden) Umeå		
2010–11 UWCL	(Auvergne-Rhône-Alpes) Olympique Lyonnais (1st)		(Netherlands) AZ	(Russia) Rossiyanka	(Russia) Zvezda	(England) Arsenal	(Germany) Turbine
2010–11 UWCL	(Occitania (administrative region)) Montpellier (2nd)	(Romania) Târgu Mureş ^{1}	(Iceland) Breiðablik	(Italy) Torres	(Germany) Turbine		
2011–12 UWCL	(Auvergne-Rhône-Alpes) Olympique Lyonnais (1st)		(Romania) Olimpia	(Czechoslovakia) Sparta	(Denmark) Brøndby	(Germany) Turbine	(Germany) Frankfurt
2011–12 UWCL	(Île-de-France) Paris Saint-Germain (2nd)		(Republic of Ireland) Peamount	(Germany) Frankfurt			
2012–13 UWCL	(Auvergne-Rhône-Alpes) Olympique Lyonnais (1st)		(Finland) PK-35	(Russia) Zorky	(Sweden) Malmö	(France) Juvisy	(Germany) Wolfsburg
2012–13 UWCL	(Île-de-France) Juvisy (2nd)		(Switzerland) Zürich	(Norway) Stabæk	(Sweden) Göteborg	(France) Olympique	
2013–14 UWCL	(Auvergne-Rhône-Alpes) Olympique Lyonnais (1st)		(Netherlands) Twente	(Germany) Turbine			
2013–14 UWCL	(Île-de-France) Paris Saint-Germain (2nd)		(Sweden) Tyresö				
2014–15 UWCL	(Auvergne-Rhône-Alpes) Olympique Lyonnais (1st)		(Italy) Brescia	(France) PSG			
2014–15 UWCL	(Île-de-France) Paris Saint-Germain (2nd)		(Netherlands) Twente	(France) Olympique	(Scotland) Glasgow	(Germany) Wolfsburg	(Germany) Frankfurt
2015–16 UWCL	(Auvergne-Rhône-Alpes) Olympique Lyonnais (1st)		(Poland) Medyk	(Spain) Atlético	(Czech Republic) Slavia	(France) PSG	(Germany) Wolfsburg
2015–16 UWCL	(Île-de-France) Paris Saint-Germain (2nd)		(Romania) Olimpia	(Sweden) Örebro	(Spain) Barcelona	(France) Olympique	
2016–17 UWCL	(Auvergne-Rhône-Alpes) Olympique Lyonnais (1st)		(Norway) Avaldsnes	(Switzerland) Zürich	(Germany) Wolfsburg	(England) Manchester	(France) PSG
2016–17 UWCL	(Île-de-France) Paris Saint-Germain (2nd)		(Norway) Lillestrøm	(Kazakhstan) Kazygurt	(Germany) Bayern	(Spain) Barcelona	(France) Olympique
2016–17 UWCL	(Auvergne-Rhône-Alpes) Olympique Lyonnais (1st)		(Poland) Medyk	(Kazakhstan) Kazygurt			
2016–17 UWCL	(Occitania (administrative region)) Montpellier (2nd)		(Russia) Zvezda	(Italy) Brescia			

^{1} Group stage. Highest-ranked eliminated team in case of qualification, lowest-ranked qualified team in case of elimination.

== Results by team ==
=== Juvisy ===
2003–04 UEFA Women's Cup
Round	Opponent	1st	2nd	Agg.	Scorers
Last 32 (group stage)	(Republic of Ireland) University College Dublin	6–1			Bourdille 2 - Perraudeau 2 - Tonazzi 2
Last 32 (group stage)	(Poland) AZS Wroclaw	3–0			Soubeyrand 2 - Guilbert
Last 32 (group stage)	(Norway) Kolbotn (host)	1–2		6 points	Perraudeau

2006–07 UEFA Women's Cup
Round	Opponent	1st	2nd	Agg.	Scorers
Last 36 (group stage)	(Faroe Islands) KÍ	6–0			Pichon 2 - Butel - Lacroix - Moresco - Tonazzi
Last 36 (group stage)	(Spain) Espanyol	0–1			
Last 36 (group stage)	(Scotland) Hibernian (host)	6–0		6 points	Tonazzi 3 - Pichon 2 - Lacroix

2010–11 UEFA Women's Champions League
Round	Opponent	1st	2nd	Agg.	Scorers
Qualifiers (group stage)	(Romania) Târgu Mureș	5–1			Tonazzi 3 - Lebailly - Trimoreau
Qualifiers (group stage)	(Estonia) Levadia Tallinn	12–0			Machart 4 - Lebailly 2 - Pourtalet 2 - Fernandes - Mendes - Soubeyrand - Thiney
Qualifiers (group stage)	(Iceland) Breiðablik (host)	3–3		7 points	Coquet - Machart - Mendes
Last 32	(Iceland) Breiðablik	a: 3–0	h: 6–0	9–0	Machart 3 - Coquet 2 - Thiney 2 - Soubeyrand - Tonazzi
Last 16	(Italy) Torres	a: 2–1	h: 2–2	4–3	Tonazzi 3 - Coquet
Quarterfinals	(Germany) Turbine Potsdam	h: 0–3	a: 2–6	2–9	Tonazzi - Thiney

2012–13 UEFA Women's Champions League
Round	Opponent	1st	2nd	Agg.	Scorers
Last 32	(Switzerland) Zürich	a: 1–1	h: 1–0	2–1	Thiney 2
Last 16	(Norway) Stabæk	a: 0–0	h: 2–1	2–1	Cayman - Soubeyrand
Quarterfinals	(Sweden) Göteborg	h: 1–0	a: 3–1	4–1	Catala 2 - Cayman - Machart
Semifinals	(France) Olympique Lyonnais	a: 0–3	h: 1–6	1–9	Diani

=== Montpellier ===
2004–05 UEFA Women's Cup
Round	Opponent	1st	2nd	Agg.	Scorers
Last 36 (group stage)	(Republic of Ireland) University College Dublin	5–0			Lattaf 2 - Ayachi - Faisandier - Ramos
Last 36 (group stage)	(Austria) Neulengbach	7–0			Bompastor 2 - Lattaf 2 - Ramos 2 - Lacaze
Last 36 (group stage)	(Portugal) 1º Dezembro	1–0		9 points	Ramos
Last 16 (group stage)	(Germany) Turbine Potsdam (host)	0–6			
Last 16 (group stage)	(Italy) Torres	1–2			Ramos
Last 16 (group stage)	(Poland) AZS Wroclaw	0–2		0 points	

2005–06 UEFA Women's Cup
Round	Opponent	1st	2nd	Agg.	Scorers
Last 36 (group stage)	(Northern Ireland) Glentoran	8–0			Hamou Maamar 3 - Bompastor 2 - Ramos 2 - Faisandier
Last 36 (group stage)	(Wales) Cardiff City	2–0			Faisandier - Soyer
Last 36 (group stage)	(Portugal) 1º Dezembro (host)	1–0		9 points	Faisandier
Last 16 (group stage)	(Netherlands) Saestum	2–1			Faisandier - Lattaf
Last 16 (group stage)	(Austria) Neulengbach	3–0			Faisandier - Lattaf - Thomis
Last 16 (group stage)	(Germany) Turbine Potsdam	0–0		7 points	
Quarterfinals	(Denmark) Brøndby	h: 3–0	a: 3–1	6–1	Thomis 3 - Lattaf 2 - Faisandier
Semifinals	(Germany) Frankfurt	a: 1–0	h: 2–3	3–3 (agr)	Diguelman 3

2009–10 UEFA Women's Champions League
Round	Opponent	1st	2nd	Agg.	Scorers
Qualifiers (group stage)	(Faroe Islands) KÍ	2–0			
Qualifiers (group stage)	(North Macedonia) Tikvesanka (host)	7–1			
Qualifiers (group stage)	(Bulgaria) NSA Sofia	3–0		9 points	
Last 32	(Belgium) Standard Liège	a: 0–0	h: 3–1	3–1	Delie - Hamou-Maamar - Ramos
Last 16	(Germany) Bayern Munich	h: 0–0	a: 1–0 (aet)	1–0	Lattaf
Quarterfinals	(Sweden) Umeå	a: 0–0	h: 2–2	2–2 (agr)	Diguelman - Plaza

2017–18 UEFA Women's Champions League
Round	Opponent	1st	2nd	Agg.	Scorers
Last 32	(Russia) Zvezda Perm	h: 0–1	a: 2–0	2–1	Jakobsson 2
Last 16	(Italy) Brescia				

=== Olympique Lyonnais ===
2007–08 UEFA Women's Cup
Round	Opponent	1st	2nd	Agg.	Scorers
Last 40 (group stage)	(Slovakia) Slovan Duslo Šaľa	12–0			Kátia 3 - Necib 3 - Abily 2 - Bretigny - Henry - Renard
Last 40 (group stage)	(North Macedonia) Skiponjat (host)	10–0			Bretigny 3 - Thomis 3 - Cruz 2 - Necib - Simone
Last 40 (group stage)	(Bosnia and Herzegovina) Sarajevo	7–0		9 points	Kátia 3 - Bompastor 2 - Dusang - Necib
Last 16 (group stage)	(Denmark) Brøndby	0–0			
Last 16 (group stage)	(Norway) Kolbotn	1–0			Abily
Last 16 (group stage)	(Czech Republic) Sparta Prague	2–1		7 points	Abily - Renard
Quarterfinals	(England) Arsenal	h: 0–0	a: 3–2	3–2	Abily - Kátia - Thomis
Semifinals	(Sweden) Umeå	h: 1–1	a: 0–0	1–1 (agr)	Abily

2008–09 UEFA Women's Cup
Round	Opponent	1st	2nd	Agg.	Scorers
Last 16 (group stage)	(Austria) Neulengbach	8–0			Abily 2 - Necib 2 - Bompastor - Georges - Schelin - Thomis
Last 16 (group stage)	(Switzerland) Zürich (host)	7–1			Kátia 3 - Schelin 2 - Abily - Bretigny
Last 16 (group stage)	(England) Arsenal	3–0		9 points	Schelin 2 - Abily
Quarterfinals	(Italy) Bardolino	a: 5–0	h: 4–1	9–1	Bretigny 2 - Franco 2 - Schelin 2 - Abily - Kátia - Necib
Semifinals	(Germany) Duisburg	h: 1–1	a: 1–3	2–4	Stensland - Thomis

2009–10 UEFA Women's Champions League
Round	Opponent	1st	2nd	Agg.	Scorers
Last 32	(Serbia) Mašinac Niš	a: 1–0	h: 5–0	6–0	Necib 2 - Bretigny - Schelin - Simone - Thomis
Last 16	(Denmark) Fortuna Hjørring	a: 1–0	h: 5–0	6–0	
Quarterfinals	(Italy) Torres	h: 3–0	a: 0–1	3–1	Schelin 2 - Cruz
Semifinals	(Sweden) Umeå	h: 3–2	a: 0–0	3–2	Necib 2 - Kátia
Final	(Germany) Turbine Potsdam	0–0 (aet)		0–0 (p: 6–7)	

2010–11 UEFA Women's Champions League
Round	Opponent	1st	2nd	Agg.	Scorers
Last 32	(Netherlands) AZ	a: 2–1	h: 8–0	10–1	Schelin 3 - Le Sommer 2 - Renard 2 - Cruz - Dickenmann - Thomis
Last 16	(Russia) Rossiyanka	a: 6–1	h: 5–0	11–1	Schelin 4 - Abily - Bompastor - Bretigny - Dickenmann - Le Sommer - Necib
Quarterfinals	(Russia) Zvezda Perm	a: 0–0	h: 1–0	1–0	Dickenmann
Semifinals	(England) Arsenal	h: 2–0	a: 3–2	5–2	Le Sommer 2 - Schelin 2 - Dickenmann
Final	(Germany) Turbine Potsdam	2–0		2–0	Dickenmann - Renard

2011–12 UEFA Women's Champions League
Round	Opponent	1st	2nd	Agg.	Scorers
Last 32	(Romania) Olimpia Cluj	a: 9–0	h: 3–0	12–0	Le Sommer 4 - Abily 2 - Bompastor - Cruz - Majri - Renard - Schelin - Thomis
Last 16	(Czech Republic) Sparta Prague	a: 6–0	h: 6–0	12–0	Schelin 3 - Abily 2 - Le Sommer 2 - Dickenmann - Franco - Georges - Necib - Thomis
Quarterfinals	(Denmark) Brøndby	h: 4–0	a: 4–0	8–0	Abily 2 - Le Sommer 2 - Bompastor - Dickenmann - Necib - Thomis
Semifinals	(Germany) Turbine Potsdam	h: 5–1	a: 0–0	5–1	Abily 2 - Dickenmann - Renard - Schelin
Final	(Germany) Frankfurt	2–0		2–0	Abily - Le Sommer

2012–13 UEFA Women's Champions League
Round	Opponent	1st	2nd	Agg.	Scorers
Last 32	(Finland) PK-35	a: 7–0	h: 5–0	12–0	Abily 2 - Majri 2 - Tonazzi 2 - Bompastor - Dickenmann - Henry - Le Sommer - Necib - Renard
Last 16	(Russia) Zorky Krasnogorsk	a: 9–0	h: 2–0	11–0	Necib 3 - Henry 2 - Tonazzi 2 - Abily - Bompastor - Otaki
Quarterfinals	(Sweden) LdB Malmö	h: 5–0	a: 3–0	8–0	Schelin 3 - Abily - Necib - Rapinoe - Renard - Thomis
Semifinals	(France) Juvisy	h: 3–0	a: 6–1	9–1	Schelin 4 - Tonazzi 2 - Abily - Rapinoe - Renard
Final	(Germany) Wolfsburg	0–1		0–1	

2013–14 UEFA Women's Champions League
Round	Opponent	1st	2nd	Agg.	Scorers
Last 32	(Netherlands) Twente	a: 4–0	h: 6–0	10–0	Necib 2 - Schelin 2 - Tonazzi 2 - Bussaglia - Kumagai - Le Sommer - Rapinoe
Last 16	(Germany) Turbine Potsdam	a: 1–0	h: 1–2	2–2 (agr)	Abily - Necib

2014–15 UEFA Women's Champions League
Round	Opponent	1st	2nd	Agg.	Scorers
Last 32	(Italy) Brescia	a: 5–0	h: 9–0	14–0	Le Sommer 5 - Abily 3 - Necib 2 - Schelin 2 - Hegerberg - Renard
Last 16	(France) Paris Saint-Germain	a: 1–1	h: 0–1	1–2	Franco

2015–16 UEFA Women's Champions League
Round	Opponent	1st	2nd	Agg.	Scorers
Last 32	(Poland) Medyk Konin	a: 6–0	h: 3–0	9–0	Hegerberg 4 - Bremer 2 - Le Sommer 2 - Renard
Last 16	(Spain) Atlético Madrid	a: 3–1	h: 6–0	9–1	Hegerberg 4 - Schelin 2 - Kumagai - Necib - Thomis
Quarterfinals	(Czech Republic) Slavia Prague	h: 9–1	a: 0–0	9–1	Abily 2 - Hegerberg 2 - Mbock Bathy 2 - Le Sommer - Majri - Necib
Semifinals	(France) Paris Saint-Germain	h: 7–0	a: 1–0	8–0	Hegerberg 2 - Le Sommer 2 - Schelin 2 - Abily - Necib
Final	(Germany) Wolfsburg	1–1 (aet)		1–1 (p: 4–3)	Hegerberg

2016–17 UEFA Women's Champions League
Round	Opponent	1st	2nd	Agg.	Scorers
Last 32	(Norway) Avaldsnes	a: 5–2	h: 5–0	10–2	Le Sommer 3 - Abily 2 - Cascarino - Hegerberg - Kumagai - Marozsán - Renard
Last 16	(Switzerland) Zürich	h: 8–0	a: 9–0	17–0	Hegerberg 3 - Lavogez 3 - Abily 2 - Le Sommer 2 - Tarrieu 2 - Kumagai - Mbock Bathy - Seger - Franco - Renard
Quarterfinals	(Germany) Wolfsburg	a: 2–0	h: 0–1	2–1	Abily - Marozsán
Semifinals	(England) Manchester City	a: 3–1	h: 0–1	3–2	Kumagai – Le Sommer – Marozsán
Final	(France) Paris Saint-Germain	0–0 (aet)		0–0 (p: 7–6)	

2017–18 UEFA Women's Champions League
Round	Opponent	1st	2nd	Agg.	Scorers
Last 32	(Poland) Medyk Konin	a: 5–0	h: 9–0	14–0	Hegerberg 5 – Renard 4 – Abily – Bronze – Kumagai – Le Sommer – Majri
Last 16	(Kazakhstan) Kazygurt				

=== Paris Saint-Germain ===
2011–12 UEFA Women's Champions League
Round	Opponent	1st	2nd	Agg.	Scorers
Last 32	(Republic of Ireland) Peamount United	a: 2–0	h: 3–0	5–0	Coton-Pélagie 2 - Dali - Debonne - Thomas
Last 16	(Germany) Frankfurt	a: 0–3	h: 2–1	2–4	Long 2

2013–14 UEFA Women's Champions League
Round	Opponent	1st	2nd	Agg.	Scorers
Last 32	(Sweden) Tyresö	a: 1–2	h: 0–0	1–2	Delannoy

2014–15 UEFA Women's Champions League
Round	Opponent	1st	2nd	Agg.	Scorers
Last 32	(Netherlands) Twente	a: 2–1	h: 1–0	3–1	Asllani - Cruz - Horan
Last 16	(France) Olympique Lyonnais	h: 1–1	a: 1–0	2–1	Alushi 2
Quarterfinals	(Scotland) Glasgow City	a: 2–0	h: 5–0	7–0	Dali - Delannoy - Deie - Hamraoui - Lahmari
Semifinals	(Germany) Wolfsburg	a: 2–0	h: 1–2	3–2	Cruz - Delannoy - Kaci
Final	(Germany) Frankfurt	1–2		1–2	Delie

2015–16 UEFA Women's Champions League
Round	Opponent	1st	2nd	Agg.	Scorers
Last 32	(Romania) Olimpia Cluj	a: 6–0	h: 9–0	15–0	Cristiane 5 - Horan 2 - Mittag 2 - Sarr 2 - Cruz - Dahlkvist - Delannoy
Last 16	(Sweden) Örebro	a: 1–1	h: 0–0	1–1 (agr)	Mittag
Quarterfinals	(Spain) Barcelona	a: 0–0	h: 1–0	1–0	Cristiane
Semifinals	(France) Olympique Lyonnais	a: 0–7	h: 0–1	0–8	

2016–17 UEFA Women's Champions League
Round	Opponent	1st	2nd	Agg.	Scorers
Last 32	(Norway) Lillestrøm	a: 1–3	h: 4–1	5–4	Cristiane 3 - Boquete - Paredes
Last 16	(Kazakhstan) Kazygurt	a: 3–0	h: 4–1	7–1	Paredes 2 - Sarr 2 - Cruz - Delie
Quarterfinals	(Germany) Bayern Munich	a: 0–1	h: 4–0	4–1	Cristiane 2 - Cruz - Delie
Semifinals	(Spain) Barcelona	a: 3–1	2–0	5–1	Cristiane - Cruz - Delannoy - Delie
Final	(France) Olympique Lyonnais	0–0 (aet)		0–0 (p: 6–7)	

=== Toulouse ===
2001–02 UEFA Women's Cup
Round	Opponent	1st	2nd	Agg.	Scorers
Last 32 (group stage)	(Ukraine) Lehenda Chernihiv	1–0			
Last 32 (group stage)	(Croatia) Osijek	6–0			Rouquet 3 - Kramo 2 - Pavailler
Last 32 (group stage)	(Scotland) Ayr United	2–2		7 points	Monicolle - Samptiaux
Quarterfinals	(England) Arsenal	a: 1–1	h: 2–1 (aet)	3–2	Briche - Kramo - Rouquet
Semifinals	(Germany) Frankfurt	h: 1–2	a: 0–0	1–2	Rouquet

2002–03 UEFA Women's Cup
Round	Opponent	1st	2nd	Agg.	Scorers
Last 32 (group stage)	(Hungary) Femina Budapest	1–0			Maugeais
Last 32 (group stage)	(Italy) Lazio	1–1			Traïkia
Last 32 (group stage)	(Israel) Maccabi Haifa	9–0		7 points	Briche 4 - Traïkia 4 - Maugeais
Quarterfinals	(Sweden) Umeå	a: 0–2	h: 0–0	0–2	
