= 2001–02 UEFA Women's Cup knockout phase =

Tournament details
- Dates: 16 March 2002 – 23 May 2002
- Teams: 8

The 2001–02 UEFA Women's Cup knockout phase began on 16 March 2002 and concluded on 23 May 2002 at the Waldstadion in Frankfurt, Germany to decide the champions of the 2001–02 UEFA Women's Cup. A total of 8 teams competed in the knockout phase.

== Bracket ==
Quarter-finals
(Sweden) Umeå	4	3	7
(Russia) Ryazan	1	1	2
(Norway) Trondheims-Ørn	2	0	2
(Finland) HJK	1	2	3
(England) Arsenal	1	1	2
(France) Toulouse	1	2	3
(Denmark) Odense	0	1	1
(Germany) Frankfurt	3	2	5

Semi-finals
(Sweden) Umeå	2	1	3
(Finland) HJK Helsinki	1	0	1
(France) Toulouse	1	0	1
(Germany) Frankfurt	2	0	2

Final
(Sweden) Umeå	0
(Germany) Frankfurt	2

== Quarter-finals ==
Team 1	Agg.	Team 2	1st leg	2nd leg
Umeå (Sweden)	7–2	(Russia) Ryazan	4–1	3–1
Trondheims-Ørn (Norway)	2–3	(Finland) HJK	2–1	0–2
Arsenal (England)	2–3	(France) Toulouse	1–1	1–2 (a.e.t.)
Odense (Denmark)	1–5	(Germany) Frankfurt	0–3	1–2

17 March 2002

Umeå (Sweden)	4–1	(Russia) Ryazan
Ljungberg 45', 81'; Moström 77' (pen.); Runesson 80'	Report	Zinchenko 29'

Sandåkerns IP, Umeå
Attendance: 1,957
Referee: Geja Mulder (Netherlands)
28 March 2002

Ryazan (Russia)	1–3	(Sweden) Umeå
Pustovoitova 70'	Report	Ljungberg 5', 37'; Runesson 73'

Albena 1 Stadium, Albena
Attendance: 100
Referee: Sabrina Rinaldi (Italy)

Umea won 7–2 on aggregate.

16 March 2002

Trondheims-Ørn (Norway)	2–1	(Finland) HJK
Valkonen 7' (o.g.); Sandaune 24'	Report	Sarapää 50'

Abrahallen, Trondheim
Attendance: 489
Referee: Wendy Toms (England)
28 March 2002

HJK (Finland)	2–0	(Norway) Trondheims-Ørn
Kalmari 43', 79'	Report

Tali Hall, Helsinki
Attendance: 780
Referee: Christine Frai (Germany)

HJK won 3–2 on aggregate.

16 March 2002

Arsenal (England)	1–1	(France) Toulouse
Grant 38'	Report	Rouquet 78'

Meadow Park, Borehamwood
Attendance: 1,695
30 March 2002

Toulouse (France)	2–1 (a.e.t.)	(England) Arsenal
Bonnet 79'; Kramo 115'	Report	Maggs 90'

Stade des Sept-Deniers, Toulouse
Attendance: 3,628

Toulouse won 3–2 on aggregate.

16 March 2002

Odense (Denmark)	0–3	(Germany) Frankfurt
	Report	Pia Wunderlich 22'; Prinz 30'; Jones 36'

Odense Atletikstadion, Odense
31 March 2002

Frankfurt (Germany)	2–1	(Denmark) Odense
Lingor 52', 67' (pen.)	Report	Werming 21'

Stadion am Brentanobad, Frankfurt
Attendance: 2,700
Referee: Nicole Petignat (Switzerland)

Frankfurt won 5–1 on aggregate.

== Semi-finals ==
Team 1	Agg.	Team 2	1st leg	2nd leg
Umeå (Sweden)	3–1	(Finland) HJK Helsinki	2–1	1–0
Toulouse (France)	1–2	(Germany) Frankfurt	1–2	0–0

14 April 2002

Umeå (Sweden)	2–1	(Finland) HJK
Ljungberg 47'; Kapstad 68'	Report	Kalmari 28'

Sandåkerns IP, Umeå
Attendance: 5,722
Referee: Elke Günthner (Germany)
27 April 2002

HJK (Finland)	0–1	(Sweden) Umeå
	Report	Ljungberg 9'

Finnair Stadium, Helsinki
Attendance: 930
Referee: Nicole Petignat (Switzerland)

Umeå won 3–1 on aggregate.

14 April 2002

Toulouse (France)	1–2	(Germany) Frankfurt
Rouquet 8'	Report	Meier 32'; Jones 60'

Stade des Sept-Deniers, Toulouse
Attendance: 3,500
28 April 2002

Frankfurt (Germany)	0–0	(France) Toulouse
	Report

Stadion am Brentanobad, Frankfurt
Attendance: 3,700

Frankfurt won 2–1 on aggregate.

== Final ==
23 May 2002
18:00 UTC+2

Umeå (Sweden)	0–2	(Germany) Frankfurt
	Report	Jones 68'; Prinz 89'

Waldstadion, Frankfurt
Attendance: 12,106
Referee: Katriina Elovirta (Finland)
