= 2001 FA Women's Charity Shield =

Annual football match

Arsenal	Doncaster Belles
5	2
- Date: 11 August 2001
- Venue: Kingsmeadow, Kingston upon Thames
- Referee: Janie Frampton
- Attendance: 1,003

The 2001 FA Women's Charity Shield was the second Women's FA Charity Shield, as with its male equivalent, the Charity Shield is an annual football match played between the winners of the previous season's league and the previous season's Women's FA Cup. The match was contested between Arsenal and Doncaster Belles on Saturday 11 August 2001. Arsenal won 5–2.

== Match ==
=== Details ===
11 August 2001
Final

Arsenal	5–2	Doncaster Belles
Grant 5'; Ludlow 12', 71'; Spacey 20'; Banks 90'	Report	Garside 6'; Walker 49'

Kingsmeadow, Kingston upon Thames
Attendance: 1,003
Referee: Janie Frampton

Arsenal	Doncaster Belles

GK	(Republic of Ireland) Emma Byrne	(substituted off) 87'
DF	(Scotland) Pauline MacDonald
DF	(England) Casey Stoney	(substituted off) 72'
DF	(England) Faye White
WB	(England) Clare Wheatley	(substituted off) 45'
MF	(Republic of Ireland) Ciara Grant	(substituted off) 76'
MF	(Wales) Jayne Ludlow
MF	(England) Sian Williams (captain)
WB	(England) Kirsty Pealling
FW	(England) Angela Banks
FW	(England) Marieanne Spacey	(substituted off) 80'
Substitutes:
GK	(England) Toni-Anne Wayne	(substituted on) 87'
DF	(Republic of Ireland) Yvonne Tracy	(substituted on) 72'
DF	(England) Leanne Champ	(substituted on) 45'
FW	(England) Ellen Maggs	(substituted on) 76'
FW	(England) Emma Moore	(substituted on) 80'
Manager:
(England) Vic Akers

GK	(England) Leanne Hall
DF	(England) Stacey Copeland
DF	(England) Becky Easton
DF	(England) Mandy Lowe
DF	Daniella Petrovic	(substituted off) 87'
MF	(England) Aran Embleton	(substituted off) 77'
MF	(England) Karen Burke
MF	(England) Vicky Exley
MF	(England) Sarah Abrahams	(substituted off) 84'
FW	(England) Melanie Garside	(substituted off) 61'
FW	(England) Karen Walker
Substitutes:
DF	(England) Lizzie Gomersall	(substituted on) 87'
DF	Gemma McCool	(substituted on) 77'
FW	(England) Gail Borman	(substituted on) 61'
FW	(England) Jo Torr	(substituted on) 84'
Manager:
(England) Julie Chipchase
