= Natalia Ryzhevich =

Belarusian footballer

Natalia Ryzhevich (born 4 March 1977) is a Belarusian former footballer.

She played as a midfielder for FC Babruyshanka, Universitet Vitebsk and FC Minsk in Belarus, and Lada Togliatti in Russia. She also played the UEFA Champions League with all but Minsk.

Ryzhevich was a founding member of the Belarusian national team, taking part in November 1995 in its first game ever, in the Euro 1997 qualifiers. She played in the national team for 13 years, until 2008.
