= Tamara Jovanović =

Serbian footballer (born 1985)

Personal information
- Full name: Tamara Jovanović
- Date of birth: 22 May 1985 (age 41)
- Place of birth: Niš, SFR Yugoslavia
- Position: Midfielder

Senior career*
Years	Team	Apps	(Gls)
	Mašinac Niš	211	(76)
- Volos 2004
2011	→ Olympia Sofia (loan)	1	(1)

International career
2004–2011	Serbia	24	(1)
- * Club domestic league appearances and goals

Tamara Jovanović (Serbian Cyrillic: Тамара Јовановић; born 22 May 1985) is a Serbian retired football midfielder who played for Mašinac Niš in the Serbian First League. She was Mašinac's top scorer in the European Cup with 12 goals, and she was a member of the Serbian national team. In 2012, she retired and joined Mašinac's coaching staff.
