= Sandåkerns IP =

Sports ground in Umeå, Sweden

Coordinates: 63°50′2″N 20°13′48″E

- Interactive map of Sandåkerns IP
- Location: Umeå, Sweden
- Type: sports ground

Tenant
- Umeå FC Umeå IK

Sandåkerns IP was a football stadium in Umeå, Sweden and the former home stadium for the football teams Umeå IK and Umeå FC
