= Gabriela Enache =

Romanian footballer

Personal information
- Full name: Gabriela Ștefania Enache
- Date of birth: 27 December 1974 (age 51)
- Place of birth: Brăila, Romania
- Positions: Forward; centre-back

Senior career*
Years	Team	Apps	(Gls)
1990–1994	Venus Brăila		
1994–1995	Fartec Brașov		
1995–1997	CFR Constanța		
1997–1998	ICIM Brașov		
1998–2000	Conpet Ploiești		
2000–2002	FC Codru Anenii Noi (Chișinău)		
2002–2003	Atletico Orestano		
2003–2010	Villaputzu		
2010–2012	ACF Villacidro		

International career
	Romania	92	(57)
- * Club domestic league appearances and goals

Gabriela Ștefania Enache (born 27 December 1974) is a retired women's association football player who played for the Romania women's national football team. She is Romania's all-time leading female international goal scorer.

On 14 August 2001, Enache scored the first-ever goal and hat-trick in the UEFA Women's Cup, the European women's club football tournament later known as the UEFA Women's Champions League. She was also the first tournament's leading goal scorer.

== Early life ==
Enache is from the city of Brăila in Muntenia, eastern Romania, where she initially played handball. She switched to football when she was 15 years old and debuted in the Division B league a year later with Voința Brăila.

== Club career ==
=== In Romania ===
Enache played for Romanian clubs Voința Brăila (later named Venus Brăila) until its disbandment in 1994, then Fartec Brașov until its disbandment in 1995. She then played for CFR Constanța until 1997, then for the revival of Fartec Brașov as ICIM Brașov until 1998. She then joined champions Conpet Ploiești, which faltered after the withdrawal of its sponsor in 2000.

She won the Romanian league with Fartec Brașov in 1995, and twice with Conpet Ploiești in 1999 and 2000.

=== In Moldova ===
After the destabilization of Ploiești, Enache joined Moldovan FC Codru Chișinău, which won the Moldovan Women's Football Championship in her first season and qualified for the first UEFA women's club competition, the 2001–02 UEFA Women's Cup.

Over a two-legged qualification round match against Slovenian club NK Ilirija Ljubljana, Enache scored four times in the first leg and six in the second during Codru's 18–0 win on aggregate. Enache's second-minute goal in the first leg was the first goal ever scored at the tournament, and her third goal in the first leg sealed the tournament's first hat-trick. She scored a further two goals against College Sports Club Yerevan of Armenia in a 9–0 victory during the group stage, but Codru failed to advance. Enache finished the tournament with 12 goals, the most of any player.

=== In Italy ===
In 2002, Enache transferred to ASD Torres Calcio but was unable to receive a work permit and never joined the team. She instead played for Serie B club Atletico Orestano and signed a professional contract. In 2003 she transferred again to Villaputzu. Over her eight-year career as a striker in Italy, Enache scored more than 130 goals. In 2010, she changed positions to become a central defender with ACF Villacidro, then retired in 2012.

== International career ==
Enache scored 57 goals in 92 international appearances over 11 years with Romania's senior national team.

== Personal life ==
Enache is married to Romanian coach and former footballer Miron Tudose.

== Honors ==
- Romanian Championship (3): 1995, 1999, 2000
- Moldovan Women's Football Championship (1): 2001
