= Toni-Anne Wayne =

English footballer (born 1983)

Personal information
- Date of birth: 8 May 1983 (age 43)
- Position: Goalkeeper

Senior career*
| Years | Team | Apps | (Gls) |
| 2001 – 2002 | Arsenal | | |
- * Club domestic league appearances and goals

Toni-Anne Wayne (born 8 May 1983) is a former youth England women's international footballer who played for West Ham, Arsenal, and Tottenham.

== International career ==
Toni-Anne Wayne has represented England at the 2002 FIFA U-19 Women's World Championship.

== Honours ==
Arsenal

- FA Community Shield: 2001
- FA Cup: 2006–07 runner-up
