= 2001–02 UEFA Women's Cup =

Tournament details
- Dates: 14 Sep 2001 - 23 May 2002
- Teams: 33 (from 33 confederations)

Final positions
- Champions: (Germany) 1. FFC Frankfurt (1st title)
- Runners-up: (Sweden) Umeå IK

Tournament statistics
- Matches played: 61
- Goals scored: 320 (5.25 per match)
- Top scorer(s): (Romania) Gabriela Enache; 12 goals From group stage: (Germany) Steffi Jones; 9 goals

The UEFA Women's Cup 2001–02 was the first edition of the women's football UEFA European club competition. It took place during the 2001–02 season, from August 2001 to May 2002.

The competition was won by German Bundesliga side 1. FFC Frankfurt, who beat Sweden's Umeå IK by a score of 2–0, in the single-leg 2002 UEFA Women's Cup Final.

== Teams ==
Second qualifying round
(Germany) Frankfurt (CH)	(Sweden) Umeå (CH)	(England) Arsenal (CH)	(Denmark) Odense (CH)
(Norway) Trondheims-Ørn (CH)	(Italy) Torres (CH)	(Federal Republic of Yugoslavia) Mašinac Classic Niš (CH)	(Czech Republic) Sparta Prague (CH)
(Spain) Levante (CH)	(Iceland) KR (CH)	(Russia) Ryazan (CH)	(France) Toulouse (CH)
(Belarus) Bobruichanka Bobruisk (CH)	(Switzerland) Bern (CH)	(Netherlands) Ter Leede (CH)	(Hungary) Femina (CH)
(Poland) AZS Wrocław (CH)	(Portugal) Gatões (CH)	(Scotland) Ayr United (CH)	(Greece) Kavala (CH)
(Finland) HJK (CH)	(Faroe Islands) KÍ Klaksvík (CH)	(Belgium) Eendracht Aalst (CH)	(Austria) Landhaus Wien (CH)
(Israel) Hapoel Tel Aviv (CH)	(Croatia) Osijek (CH)	(Ukraine) Lehenda-Cheksil	(Slovakia) Žilina (CH)
(Bulgaria) Grand Hotel Varna (CH)	(Armenia) CSC Yerevan (CH)	(Luxembourg) Progrès Niedercorn (CH)	
First qualifying round
(Moldova) Codru Chişinău (CH)	(Slovenia) Ilirija (CH)		

== Qualifying round ==
=== First qualifying round ===
Team 1	Agg.	Team 2	1st leg	2nd leg
Codru Chişinău (Moldova)	18–0	(Slovenia) Ilirija	9–0	9–0

=== Second qualifying round ===
==== Group 1 ====
Pos	Team	Pld	W	D	L	GF	GA	GD	Pts	Qualification	ØRN	BOB	EEN	KR
1	(Norway) Trondheims-Ørn (H)	3	3	0	0	23	1	+22	9	Advance to quarter-finals	—	6–1	–	9–0
2	(Belarus) Bobruichanka Bobruisk	3	2	0	1	8	8	0	6		–	—	4–1	–
3	(Belgium) Eendracht Aalst	3	1	0	2	5	15	−10	3		0–8	–	—	–
4	(Iceland) KR	3	0	0	3	4	16	−12	0		–	1–3	3–4	—

Source: RSSSF
(H) Hosts

==== Group 2 ====
Pos	Team	Pld	W	D	L	GF	GA	GD	Pts	Qualification	RYA	TLE	KAV	ŽIL
1	(Russia) Ryazan (H)	3	3	0	0	28	0	+28	9	Advance to quarter-finals	—	4–0	11–0	–
2	(Netherlands) Ter Leede	3	2	0	1	9	4	+5	6		–	—	8–0	1–0
3	(Greece) Kavala	3	1	0	2	2	20	−18	3		–	–	—	2–11
4	(Slovakia) Žilina	3	0	0	3	1	16	−15	0		0–13	–	–	—

Source: RSSSF
(H) Hosts

==== Group 3 ====
Pos	Team	Pld	W	D	L	GF	GA	GD	Pts	Qualification	UME	SPR	FEM	GHV
1	(Sweden) Umeå (H)	3	3	0	0	10	0	+10	9	Advance to quarter-finals	—	1–0	–	3–0
2	(Czech Republic) Sparta Prague	3	2	0	1	8	1	+7	6		–	—	1–0	7–0
3	(Hungary) Femina Budapest	3	1	0	2	4	7	−3	3		0–6	–	—	–
4	(Bulgaria) Grand Hotel Varna	3	0	0	3	0	14	−14	0		–	–	0–4	—

Source: RSSSF
(H) Hosts

==== Group 4 ====
Pos	Team	Pld	W	D	L	GF	GA	GD	Pts	Qualification	FRA	LEV	CCH	TER
1	(Germany) Frankfurt (H)	3	3	0	0	24	0	+24	9	Advance to quarter-finals	—	1–0	5–0	–
2	(Spain) Levante	3	2	0	1	20	2	+18	6		–	—	3–1	17–0
3	(Moldova) Codru Chişinău	3	1	0	2	10	8	+2	3		–	–	—	9–0
4	(Armenia) CSC Yerevan	3	0	0	3	0	44	−44	0		0–18	–	–	—

Source: RSSSF
(H) Hosts

==== Group 5 ====
Pos	Team	Pld	W	D	L	GF	GA	GD	Pts	Qualification	HJK	TOR	KIK	LWI
1	(Finland) HJK (H)	3	3	0	0	14	1	+13	9	Advance to quarter-finals	—	–	3–0	8–0
2	(Italy) Torres	3	2	0	1	10	2	+8	6		1–2	—	–	5–0
3	(Faroe Islands) KÍ	3	1	0	2	2	9	−7	3		–	0–4	—	–
4	(Austria) Landhaus Wien	3	0	0	3	1	15	−14	0		–	–	1–2	—

Source: RSSSF
(H) Hosts

==== Group 6 ====
Pos	Team	Pld	W	D	L	GF	GA	GD	Pts	Qualification	ODE	MCN	GAT	PNI
1	(Denmark) Odense (H)	3	3	0	0	19	1	+18	9	Advance to quarter-finals	—	–	3–0	13–0
2	(Federal Republic of Yugoslavia) Masinac Niš	3	2	0	1	19	4	+15	6		1–3	—	–	–
3	(Portugal) Gatões	3	1	0	2	9	10	−1	3		–	1–7	—	8–0
4	(Luxembourg) Progrès Niedercorn	3	0	0	3	0	32	−32	0		–	0–11	–	—

Source: RSSSF
(H) Hosts

==== Group 7 ====
Pos	Team	Pld	W	D	L	GF	GA	GD	Pts	Qualification	TOU	LSH	AYR	OSI
1	(France) Toulouse	3	2	1	0	9	2	+7	7	Advance to quarter-finals	—	1–0	–	6–0
2	(Ukraine) Lehenda-Cheksil	3	1	1	1	4	4	0	4		–	—	1–1	3–2
3	(Scotland) Ayr United (H)	3	0	3	0	6	6	0	3		2–2	–	—	–
4	(Croatia) Osijek	3	0	1	2	5	12	−7	1		–	–	3–3	—

Source: RSSSF
(H) Hosts

==== Group 8 ====
Pos	Team	Pld	W	D	L	GF	GA	GD	Pts	Qualification	ARS	BER	WRO	HTA
1	(England) Arsenal	3	3	0	0	13	1	+12	9	Advance to quarter-finals	—	4–0	–	7–0
2	(Switzerland) Bern (H)	3	2	0	1	10	5	+5	6		–	—	3–1	7–0
3	(Poland) AZS Wrocław	3	1	0	2	9	5	+4	3		1–2	–	—	–
4	(Israel) Hapoel Tel Aviv	3	0	0	3	0	21	−21	0		–	–	0–7	—

Source: RSSSF
(H) Hosts

== Knockout phase ==
=== Bracket ===
Quarter-finals
(Sweden) Umeå	4	3	7
(Russia) Ryazan	1	1	2
(Norway) Trondheims-Ørn	2	0	2
(Finland) HJK	1	2	3
(England) Arsenal	1	1	2
(France) Toulouse	1	2	3
(Denmark) Odense	0	1	1
(Germany) Frankfurt	3	2	5

Semi-finals
(Sweden) Umeå	2	1	3
(Finland) HJK Helsinki	1	0	1
(France) Toulouse	1	0	1
(Germany) Frankfurt	2	0	2

Final
(Sweden) Umeå	0
(Germany) Frankfurt	2

=== Quarter-finals ===
Team 1	Agg.	Team 2	1st leg	2nd leg
Umeå (Sweden)	7–2	(Russia) Ryazan	4–1	3–1
Trondheims-Ørn (Norway)	2–3	(Finland) HJK	2–1	0–2
Arsenal (England)	2–3	(France) Toulouse	1–1	1–2 (a.e.t.)
Odense (Denmark)	1–5	(Germany) Frankfurt	0–3	1–2

=== Semi-finals ===
Team 1	Agg.	Team 2	1st leg	2nd leg
Umeå (Sweden)	3–1	(Finland) HJK Helsinki	2–1	1–0
Toulouse (France)	1–2	(Germany) Frankfurt	1–2	0–0

=== Final ===
23 May 2002
18:00 UTC+2

Umeå (Sweden)	0–2	(Germany) Frankfurt
	Report	Jones 68'; Prinz 89'

Waldstadion, Frankfurt
Attendance: 12,106
Referee: Katriina Elovirta (Finland)

== Top goalscorers ==
From group stage onward.

Rank	Player	Team	Goals
1	(Germany) Steffi Jones	Frankfurt	9
2	(Finland) Laura Kalmari	HJK	8
2	(Denmark) Merete Pedersen	Odense	8
2	(Russia) Natalia Barbachina	Ryazan	8
2	(Russia) Olga Letyushova	Ryazan	8
