= Eveliina Sarapää =

Finnish architect and footballer (born 1976)

Personal information
- Full name: Eveliina Sarapää
- Date of birth: 29 September 1976 (age 50)
- Place of birth: Oulu, Finland
- Height: 1.70 m (5 ft 7 in)
- Positions: Defender; midfielder

Senior career*
Years	Team	Apps	(Gls)
- Honka
1999–2006	HJK		
2003	→ Asker		
2007	Honka		

International career
2000–2007	Finland	67	(1)
- * Club domestic league appearances and goals

Eveliina "Eve" Sarapää (born 29 September 1976, in Oulu) is a Finnish-Saami architect and former football midfielder. She played for FC Honka and HJK Helsinki of the Naisten Liiga as well as Asker Fotball of the Norwegian Toppserien.

She was a member of the Finnish national team, and played at the 2005 European Championship.

Sarapää attended Oslo School of Architecture and Design while playing in Norway and became an architect after her football career.

== Titles ==
- 5 Finnish League (1999, 2000, 2001, 2005, 2007)
- 4 Finnish Cups (1999, 2000, 2002, 2006)
