= Pauline MacDonald =

Scottish footballer and manager

Personal information
- Date of birth: 17 April 1975 (age 51)
- Place of birth: Scotland
- Height: 5 ft 4 in (1.63 m)
- Positions: Defender; midfielder

Senior career*
Years	Team	Apps	(Gls)
- Central Fife L.F.C.
- Cumbernauld United L.F.C.
- Cove Rangers L.F.C.
- Stenhousemuir L.F.C.
1998	Miami Gliders		
1999	Atlanta Classics		
2000–2003	Arsenal		
2006–2007	Edinburgh Ladies		

International career
1992–2003	Scotland	65	

Managerial career
- 2007–2008: Dalkeith L.F.C.
- 2017–2024: Scotland under-17 women
- 2024–2025: Dallas Trinity
- * Club domestic league appearances and goals

Pauline MacDonald (born 17 April 1975) is a Scottish football coach formerly for Dallas Trinity FC of the USL Super League. Previously, she was the manager of the Scotland under-17 women's team. As a player MacDonald made her senior Scotland debut in 1992, served the national team as captain and amassed a total of 65 caps. A versatile defender or midfielder, MacDonald played at club level in the American USL W-League and the English FA Women's Premier League, as well as in her native Scotland.

== Playing career ==
=== Club career ===
MacDonald began playing organised football as an 11-year-old, with Central Fife L.F.C.. She moved to Cumbernauld United L.F.C., then to the dominant team of the era Cove Rangers L.F.C. who were based in Aberdeen. In 1998, MacDonald played for Miami Gliders of the USL W-League and was named to the second division all-star team.

English FA Women's Premier League club Arsenal signed MacDonald during the 1999–00 season.

After a period of retirement from playing, MacDonald signed for Edinburgh Ladies in September 2006.

=== International career ===
In May 1991, MacDonald captained the Scotland under-21 team to a 4–2 win over rivals England in Motherwell. She made her senior international debut in April 1992, at the Albena Cup.

== Coaching career ==
In September 2004, MacDonald was appointed as a women's football development officer for Edinburgh, a position jointly funded by the Scottish Football Association (SFA) and the local authority. Structured female youth football was completely lacking in the area and MacDonald made it her priority to remedy the situation.

MacDonald guided Dalkeith L.F.C. to promotion into the top-flight Scottish Women's Premier League in 2007–2008, her first season as a club coach. They took their Premier League place as Boroughmuir Thistle, having undergone a name change.

After approximately a decade of working for the SFA as coach and assistant coach with the national women's youth teams, MacDonald was appointed coach of the Scotland under-17 women's team in October 2017. She joined her former Scotland teammates Shelley Kerr and Pauline Hamill as a full-time female coach on the SFA payroll.

On June 19, 2024, MacDonald was announced as the inaugural head coach for Dallas Trinity FC ahead of the club's campaign, an inaugural team in the new USL Super League, which began in late August 2024. MacDonald missed the first three games of the season due to delays in obtaining her work visa. General Manager, Chris Petrucelli stepped in as interim head coach. MacDonald was present during the team's first win against Lexington SC, but was not named the coach. Following the 2024–25 USL Super League season, that saw Trinity's season end in the semifinals of the playoffs, MacDonald was relived of her duties on 25 June 2025.
