= Marie-Ange Kramo =

French footballer (born 1979)

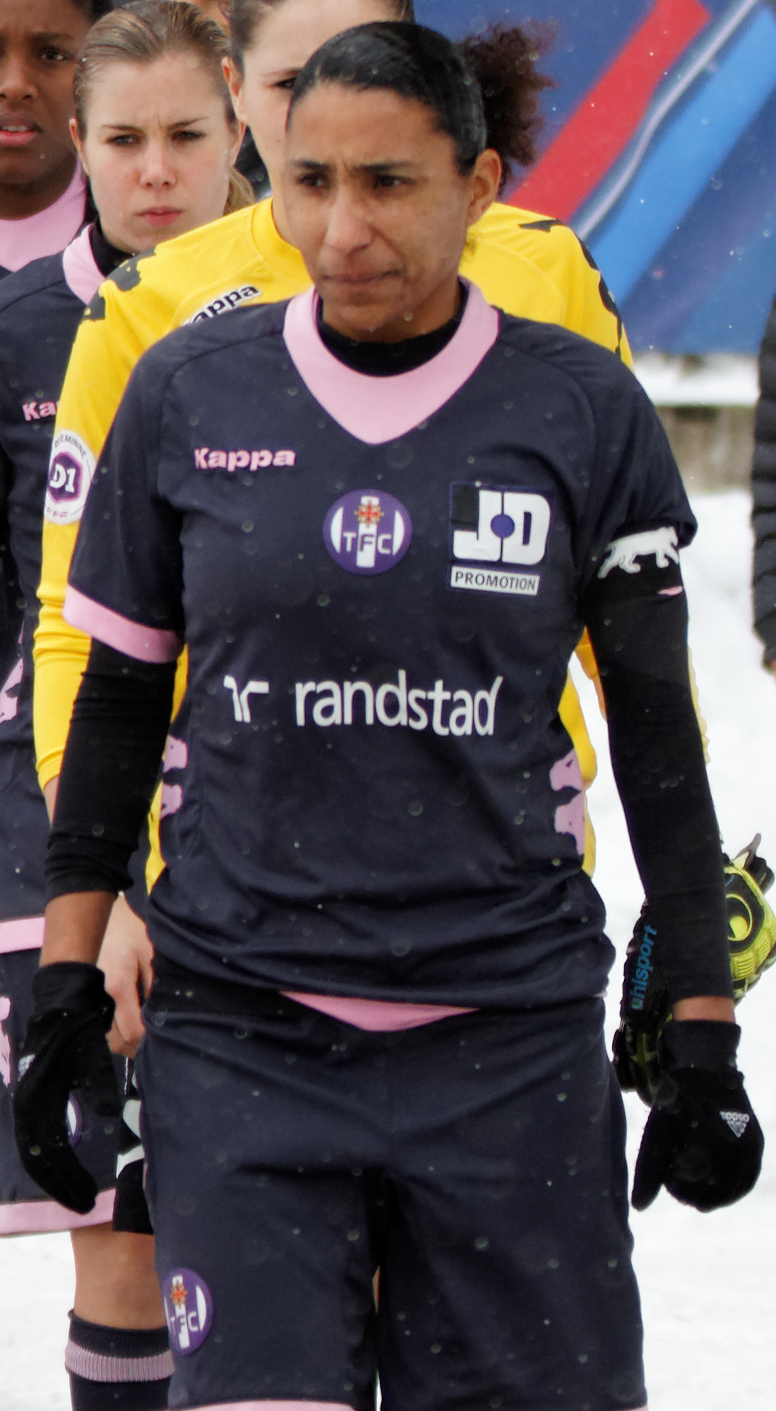
- Kramo in 2013

Personal information
- Date of birth: 20 February 1979 (age 47)
- Place of birth: Toulouse, France
- Position: Forward

Senior career*
Years	Team	Apps	(Gls)
2009–2013	Toulouse	59	(4)

International career^{‡}
	France	3	(0)
- * Club domestic league appearances and goals ‡ National team caps and goals as of 29 September 2003

Marie-Ange Kramo (born 20 February 1979) is a French women's international footballer who plays as a forward. She is a member of the France women's national football team. She was part of the team at the 2003 FIFA Women's World Cup.
