= UEFA Women's Champions League =

- Organiser(s): UEFA
- Founded: 2001; 25 years ago
- Region: Europe
- Teams: League phase: 18; Total: 74
- Qualifier for: FIFA Women's Club World Cup (proposed); FIFA Women's Champions Cup
- Related competitions: UEFA Women's Europa Cup (2nd tier)
- Current champions: (Spain) Barcelona (4th title)
- Most championships: (France) OL Lyonnes (8 titles)
- Broadcasters: List of broadcasters
- Website: Official website
- 2026–27 UEFA Women's Champions League

The UEFA Women's Champions League (UWCL), previously called the UEFA Women's Cup (2001–2009), is a European women's association football competition. It involves the top club teams from countries affiliated with the European governing body UEFA.

Winners
Season	UEFA Women's Cup
2001–02	(Germany) Frankfurt
2002–03	(Sweden) Umeå
2003–04	(Sweden) Umeå (2)
2004–05	(Germany) Turbine Potsdam
2005–06	(Germany) Frankfurt (2)
2006–07	(England) Arsenal
2007–08	(Germany) Frankfurt (3)
2008–09	(Germany) FCR Duisburg
Season	UEFA Women's Champions League
2009–10	(Germany) Turbine Potsdam (2)
2010–11	(France) Lyon
2011–12	(France) Lyon (2)
2012–13	(Germany) VfL Wolfsburg
2013–14	(Germany) VfL Wolfsburg (2)
2014–15	(Germany) Frankfurt (4)
2015–16	(France) Lyon (3)
2016–17	(France) Lyon (4)
2017–18	(France) Lyon (5)
2018–19	(France) Lyon (6)
2019–20	(France) Lyon (7)
2020–21	(Spain) Barcelona
2021–22	(France) Lyon (8)
2022–23	(Spain) Barcelona (2)
2023–24	(Spain) Barcelona (3)
2024–25	(England) Arsenal (2)
2025–26	(Spain) Barcelona (4)

The competition was first played in 2001–02 under the name UEFA Women's Cup, and renamed the Champions League for the 2009–10 edition. The most significant changes in 2009 were the inclusion of runners-up from the top eight ranked nations, a one-off final as opposed to the two-legged finals in previous years, and – until 2018 – playing the final in the same city as the men's UEFA Champions League final. In the 2021–22 season, the competition proper included a group stage for the first time in the Women's Champions League era, which evolved into a league phase from the 2025–26 season onward.

OL Lyonnes is the most successful club in the competition's history, winning the title eight times, including five consecutive titles from 2016 to 2020. Barcelona are the current defending champions, having beaten OL Lyonnes in the 2026 final.

== Format ==
=== UEFA Women's Cup (2001–2009) ===
For the tournament's first three editions, a preliminary round was first played to reduce teams to 32. Starting in the second season, this stage grouped teams into mini-tournaments of four teams, whose winners advanced to the second qualifying round, sometimes called the group stage. The group stage was eight groups of four, each group held as a round-robin in a single country, whose winners advanced to the quarter-finals.

From the 2004–05 season, the first qualifying stage was expanded to 9 groups of 4, again playing a round-robin in a single location. Seven teams got a bye to the group stage. (in 2007–08, it was 10 groups of 4, advancing winners plus one runner-up, with 5 teams getting a bye). The group stage was then played among only 16 teams in four groups of four, each group in a single host country, with the top two teams in each group advancing to the quarter-finals.

The knock-out rounds were played as two-legged home-and-home matches, including the final (except for the first final).

=== Champions League (2009–2021) ===
On 11 December 2008, UEFA announced that the competition would be reformatted and renamed to the UEFA Women's Champions League beginning with the 2009–10 season. As in the men's game, the new tournament aimed to include runners-up of the top women's football leagues in Europe.

The competition was opened to the champions of all 55 UEFA associations that had a qualifying women's league. Due to the varying participation, the number of teams playing the qualifying round changed from year to year. Numbers were based on three principles:

- Qualifying rounds are contested by groups of 4 teams.
- Group winners, plus the smallest possible number of runners-up, qualify for the Round of 32.
- Teams from the top associations would enter directly into the Round of 32.

Competition from the Round of 32 onwards would be in the form of home-and-home pairings using the away goals rule, except for the single-legged final.

==== Minor adjustments ====
When the new format was initially announced, the eight top countries according to the UEFA league coefficient were awarded two places in the league, with runners-up participating in the qualifying rounds.

For the 2011–12 tournament, the runners-up from the top eight nations instead qualified directly to the round of 32. For the five years under this format, seven nations remained in the top eight: Germany, Sweden, England, France, Denmark, Russia, and Italy. A different nation provided the eighth runners-up in each of the five years: Iceland, Norway, Austria, Czech Republic, and Spain.

The tournament was expanded for the 2016–17 season, with the runners-up from nations 9–12 in UEFA league coefficient also qualifying. For the first three years under this format, the four nations in these slots were Czech Republic, Austria, Scotland, and Norway. For the 2019–20 season, Switzerland replaced Norway, and for the final season under this format, Norway, Kazakhstan, and The Netherlands replaced Russia, Scotland, and Austria in the top 12.

In all 11 editions of the competition under this general format, qualifying rounds consisted of between 7 and 10 groups-of-4, advancing qualifying-group winners plus 0-2 top-ranked runners-up, varying year to year based on team counts. The number of teams entering at the round of 32 also varied slightly, between 20 and 25.

The COVID-19 pandemic forced a slight restructuring of the 2019–20 and 2020–21 competitions. At the start of the pandemic the round of 16 had been completed; the quarter-finals and on were delayed and eventually played as single-legged matches in the summer of 2020. The qualifying rounds of the 2020–21 competition switched to single-legged matches, with 20 pairings of teams in the first round and 10 pairings in the second round, the winners joining 22 top teams in the round of 32, which was normal from that point on aside from most matches being played behind closed doors.

=== Champions League (2021–2025) ===
On 4 December 2019, a new format was announced starting with the 2021–22 season. The top six associations entered three teams, associations ranked 7–16 entered two, and the remaining associations entered one. The competition is restructured to appear more similar to the men's CL format, with a double-round-robin group stage, and two paths through the qualifiers (a champions path and a non-champions path) for teams that do not automatically qualify for the group stage. UEFA also centralized the media rights from the group stage onward.

- Qualification takes place in two rounds: a First Round of 3- or 4-team mini-tournaments with single elimination brackets, and a Second Round of two-legged matches. Each of these rounds is split into two simultaneous paths based on how teams qualified:
  - The Champions Path consists of the champions from the associations ranked 8-50. 7 teams advance.
  - The League Path consists of the runners-up from the top 16 associations and third-place teams from the top 6 associations. 5 teams advance.
- The Group stage includes four teams qualifying directly: the defending UWCL champions and the champions from the top 3 associations. It is played in four groups of four, each advancing two teams to two-legged quarterfinals.

		Teams entering in this round	Teams advancing from the previous round
First round August	Champions Path (44 teams)	44 champions from associations 7–50	
First round August	League Path (16 teams)	10 runners-up from associations 7–16; 6 third-place teams from associations 1–6	
Second round Aug/Sept	Champions Path (14 teams)	3 champions from associations 4–6	11 final winners from the first round (Champions Path)
Second round Aug/Sept	League Path (10 teams)	6 runners-up from associations 1–6	4 final winners from the first round (League Path)
Group stage (16 teams) Oct/Nov/Dec		UEFA Women's Champions League title holder; 3 champions from associations 1–3	7 winners from the second round (Champions Path); 5 winners from the second round (League Path)
Knockout phase (8 teams) Mar/Apr/May			4 group winners from the group stage; 4 group runners-up from the group stage

=== Champions League (2025–present) ===
On 4 December 2023, a new format was announced starting with the 2025–26 season. The top seven associations enter three teams, associations ranked 8–17 enter two, and the remaining associations enter one. The competition is restructured to appear more similar to the men's CL format, with a Swiss-system 'league phase' consisting of 6 games against 6 different opponents (3 home and 3 away), and two paths (a champions path and a non-champions path) for teams that do not automatically qualify for the league stage.

- Qualification takes place in two separate paths of up to three rounds.
  - The Champions Path consists of the domestic champions from associations ranked seventh or below as well as the previous season's second competition winner with 4 teams advancing to the league stage. The first and second rounds are played as series of four-team mini-tournaments while the third round is played as two-legged ties.
  - The League Path consists of domestic runners-up from associations ranked fourth to seventeenth and domestic third-placed teams from associations ranked first to seventh. A second round is played as a series of four-team mini-tournaments, while the third round is played as two-legged ties.
  - Losers from the third round ties and runners-up and third-placed teams in the second round mini-tournaments will transfer to the UEFA Women's Europa Cup, while fourth-placed teams in the second round mini-tournaments and all losers from the first round mini-tournaments will be eliminated.
- The League phase consists of nine teams qualifying directly: The defending champions, domestic champions from the associations ranked sixth or higher as well as the domestic runners-up from the top two associations.
  - The top four teams from the league phase will advance to the quarter-finals while teams ranked fifth to twelfth will qualify to a knockout play-off round. The remaining six teams are eliminated.

Provisional access list
		Teams entering in this round	Teams advancing from the previous round
First round	Champions Path (24 teams)	24 champions from associations 29–52	
Second round	Champions Path (28 teams)	22 champions from associations 7–28	6 mini-tournament winners from the first round
Second round	League Path (16 teams)	12 runners-up from associations 6–17; 4 third-placed teams from associations 4–7	
Third round	Champions Path (8 teams)	UEFA Women's Europa Cup title holders	7 mini-tournament winners from the second round
Third round	League Path (10 teams)	3 runners-up from associations 3–5; 3 third-placed teams from associations 1–3	4 mini-tournament winners from the second round
League phase (18 teams)		UEFA Women's Champions League title holder; 6 champions from associations 1–6; 2 runners-up from associations 1–2	4 winners from the third round (Champions Path); 5 winners from the third round (League Path)
Preliminary knockout round (8 teams)			8 teams ranked 5–12 from the league phase
Knockout phase (8 teams)			4 winners from the previous play-off; 4 teams ranked 1–4 from the league phase

== Prize money ==
Prize-money was awarded for a first time in 2010, when both finalists received money. In 2011 the payments were extended to losing semi- and quarter-finalists. In these earlier years, teams sometimes complained about the sum, which did not cover costs for some longer trips. The 2021–22 Women's Champions League introduced a 16-team group stage to the competition, and with it a vastly expanded prize pool of €24M total. Of that pool, €5.6M (23%) would be used for solidarity payments to non-participating clubs of participating countries, to provide funding for development. €7M (29%) would be reserved for the qualifying rounds (some of which is travel subsidies for clubs traveling long distances), and the €11.5M remainder (48%) would be for clubs reaching the group stage and later.

For the main portion of the competition, UEFA announced that each group-stage participant would receive a minimum of €400,000 (about five times as much as Round of 16 participants received in previous editions). The winner of the tournament could earn up to €1.4 million (depending on its results in the group stage). With the move to a league phase for the 2025–26 competition, the prize-money structure for the competition proper is now as follows:

- €505,000 base allocation for each team in the league phase
- €60,000 per win in the group stage, and €20,000 per draw
- €10,000 - €180,000 bonus based on league phase ranking
- €100,000 for qualification for the knockout playoffs
- €200,000 for qualification for the quarter-finals
- €250,000 for qualification for the semi-finals
- €300,000 for the runner-up
- €500,000 for the winning team

This is in addition to any money teams may receive for participating in the qualifying rounds, and each stage's prize is cumulative.

== Sponsorship ==
Until the 2015–18 cycle, UEFA Women's Champions League used to have the same sponsors as the UEFA Champions League. Since 2018, women's football competitions such as the Champions League have separate sponsors. The tournament has centralised rights: in the group stage, only some assets and the official ball are centralised, while in knock-out rounds, UEFA started allowing only a few club sponsors, alongside the ones who are official.

As of 2024, official sponsors are:

- Adidas
- Amazon
- EA Sports FC
- Euronics
- Grifols
- Heineken
- Hublot
- Just Eat Takeaway
- PepsiCo
- PlayStation
- Visa

== Records and statistics ==
=== Winners ===
Map of UEFA associations whose teams reached the group stage/league phase of the UEFA Women's Champions League UEFA member association that has been represented in the group/league phase UEFA member association that has been represented only in the main phase of the UEFA Women's Cup before the Women's Champions League rebranding UEFA member association that has not been represented in the group/league phase

Performances in the UEFA Women's Cup and UEFA Women's Champions League by club
Club	Titles	Runners-up	Seasons won	Seasons runners-up
(France) OL Lyonnes	8	4	2011, 2012, 2016, 2017, 2018, 2019, 2020, 2022	2010, 2013, 2024, 2026
(Spain) Barcelona	4	3	2021, 2023, 2024, 2026	2019, 2022, 2025
(Germany) Eintracht Frankfurt	4	2	2002, 2006, 2008, 2015	2004, 2012
(Germany) VfL Wolfsburg	2	4	2013, 2014	2016, 2018, 2020, 2023
(Sweden) Umeå	2	3	2003, 2004	2002, 2007, 2008
(Germany) Turbine Potsdam	2	2	2005, 2010	2006, 2011
(England) Arsenal	2	0	2007, 2025	
(Germany) FCR Duisburg	1	0	2009	
(France) Paris Saint-Germain	0	2		2015, 2017
(Denmark) Fortuna Hjørring	0	1		2003
(Sweden) Djurgården	0	1		2005
(Russia) Zvezda Perm	0	1		2009
(Sweden) Tyresö	0	1		2014
(England) Chelsea	0	1		2021

=== By nation ===
Nation	Winners	Runners-up	Semi-finalists	Winner	Runners-up	Semi-finalists
Germany	9	8	11	Frankfurt (4); Turbine Potsdam (2); VfL Wolfsburg (2); Duisburg (1)	VfL Wolfsburg (4); Frankfurt (2); Turbine Potsdam (2)	Frankfurt (2); Turbine Potsdam (2); Duisburg (2); Bayern Munich (3); VfL Wolfsburg (2)
France	8	6	10	OL Lyonnes (8)	OL Lyonnes (4); Paris Saint-Germain (2)	Paris Saint-Germain (5); OL Lyonnes (2); Toulouse (1); Montpellier (1); Paris FC (1)
Spain	4	3	2	Barcelona (4)	Barcelona (3)	Barcelona (2)
Sweden	2	5	4	Umeå (2)	Umeå (3); Djurgården (1); Tyresö (1)	Umeå (2); Djurgården (1); Malmö (1)
England	2	1	13	Arsenal (2)	Chelsea (1)	Arsenal (6); Chelsea (4); Manchester City (2); Birmingham City (1)
Denmark	0	1	3		Fortuna Hjørring (1)	Brøndby (3)
Russia	0	1	0		Zvezda Perm (1)	
Norway	0	0	2			Trondheims-Ørn (1); Kolbotn (1)
Finland	0	0	1			HJK (1)
Italy	0	0	1			Bardolino Verona (1)

During the first Champions League era with no group stage (2009–2021), only one team from a nation outside the top two (France and Germany) won the title: Barcelona in 2021. Three teams from nations outside the top two nations finished runner-up: Tyresö in 2014, Barcelona in 2019 and Chelsea in 2021. Also during that era, only two teams from a nation outside the top four (then France, Germany, Sweden, and England) ever made the semi-finals: Brøndby in 2015 and Barcelona in four of the last five years under that format.

=== Top scorers by tournament ===
The top scorer award is given to the player who scores the most goals in the competition. Up until the introduction of the Champions League Group Stage it included the qualifying rounds. Since 2021–22, only goals from the group stage onwards count towards the award.

Iceland's Margrét Lára Vidarsdóttir has won the award three times. Ada Hegerberg holds the record for most goals in a season.

Season	Top scorer(s) (Club)	Goals
2001–02	(Romania) Gabriela Enache (FC Codru Anenii Noi)	12
2002–03	(Sweden) Hanna Ljungberg (Umeå IK)	10
2003–04	(Austria) Maria Gstöttner (SV Neulengbach)	11
2004–05	(Germany) Conny Pohlers (1. FFC Turbine Potsdam)	14
2005–06	(Iceland) Margrét Lára Viðarsdóttir (Valur Reykjavík)	11
2006–07	(Scotland) Julie Fleeting (Arsenal LFC)	9
2007–08	(Ukraine) Vira Dyatel (Zhilstroy-1 Karkhiv) (Italy) Patrizia Panico (ASD CF Bardolino Verona) (Iceland) Margrét Lára Viðarsdóttir (Valur Reykjavík)	9
2008–09	(Iceland) Margrét Lára Viðarsdóttir (Valur Reykjavík)	14
2009–10	(Switzerland) Vanessa Bürki (FC Bayern München)	11
2010–11	(Germany) Inka Grings (FCR 2001 Duisburg)	13
2011–12	(France) Camille Abily (Olympique Lyonnais) (France) Eugénie Le Sommer (Olympique Lyonnais)	9
2012–13	(Romania) Laura Rus (Apollon Limassol)	11
2013–14	(Bosnia and Herzegovina) Milena Nikolić (ŽFK Spartak)	11
2014–15	(Germany) Célia Šašić (Frankfurt)	14
2015–16	(Norway) Ada Hegerberg (Olympique Lyonnais)	13
2016–17	(Hungary) Zsanett Jakabfi (VfL Wolfsburg) (Netherlands) Vivianne Miedema (FC Bayern Munich)	8
2017–18	(Norway) Ada Hegerberg (Olympique Lyonnais)	15
2018–19	(Denmark) Pernille Harder (VfL Wolfsburg)	8
2019–20	(Netherlands) Vivianne Miedema (Arsenal) (Nigeria) Emueje Ogbiagbevha (Minsk) (Iceland) Berglind Björg Þorvaldsdóttir (Breiðablik)	10
2020–21	(Spain) Jenni Hermoso (Barcelona) (England) Fran Kirby (Chelsea)	6
2021–22	(Spain) Alexia Putellas (Barcelona)	11
2022–23	(Poland) Ewa Pajor (VfL Wolfsburg)	9
2023–24	(France) Kadidiatou Diani (Olympique Lyonnais)	8
2024–25	(Spain) Clàudia Pina (Barcelona)	10
2025–26	(Poland) Ewa Pajor (Barcelona)	11

=== All-time top scorers ===
As of 18 November 2026. Bold players still active.

Rank	Topscorer	Goals	Clubs
1	(Norway) Ada Hegerberg	69	Stabæk, Turbine Potsdam, OL Lyonnes
2	(Germany) Anja Mittag	51	Turbine Potsdam, FC Rosengård, Paris Saint-Germain, Wolfsburg
3	(Denmark) Pernille Harder	50	Linköping, Wolfsburg, Chelsea, Bayern Munich
3	(France) Eugénie Le Sommer	50	OL Lyonnes
5	(Germany) Conny Pohlers	48	Turbine Potsdam, 1. FFC Frankfurt, Wolfsburg
5	(Poland) Ewa Pajor	48	Medyk Konin, Wolfsburg, Barcelona
7	(Brazil) Marta	46	Umeå IK, Tyresö FF, FC Rosengård
8	(France) Camille Abily	43	Montpellier, OL Lyonnes
8	(Scotland) Kim Little	43	Hibernian, Arsenal
10	(Sweden) Lotta Schelin	42	OL Lyonnes, FC Rosengård

== Awards ==
=== Player of the Season ===
Starting from the 2021–22 edition, UEFA introduced the UEFA Women's Champions League Player of the Season award.

The jury is composed of the coaches of the clubs that participated in the group stage of the competition, as well as journalists selected by the European Sports Media (ESM) group.

Season	Player	Club
UEFA Women's Champions League Player of the Season
2021–22	(Spain) Alexia Putellas	(Spain) Barcelona
2022–23	(Spain) Aitana Bonmatí	(Spain) Barcelona
2023–24	(Spain) Aitana Bonmatí	(Spain) Barcelona
2024–25	(Spain) Aitana Bonmatí	(Spain) Barcelona
2025–26	(Spain) Alexia Putellas	(Spain) Barcelona

=== Young Player of the Season ===
In the same season, UEFA also introduced the UEFA Women's Champions League Young Player of the Season award.

Season	Player	Club
UEFA Women's Champions League Young Player of the Season
2021–22	(France) Selma Bacha	(France) Lyon
2022–23	(Germany) Lena Oberdorf	(Germany) VfL Wolfsburg
2023–24	(Haiti) Melchie Dumornay	(France) Lyon
2024–25	(Haiti) Melchie Dumornay	(France) Lyon
2025–26	(United States) Lily Yohannes	(France) OL Lyonnes

== Gallery ==
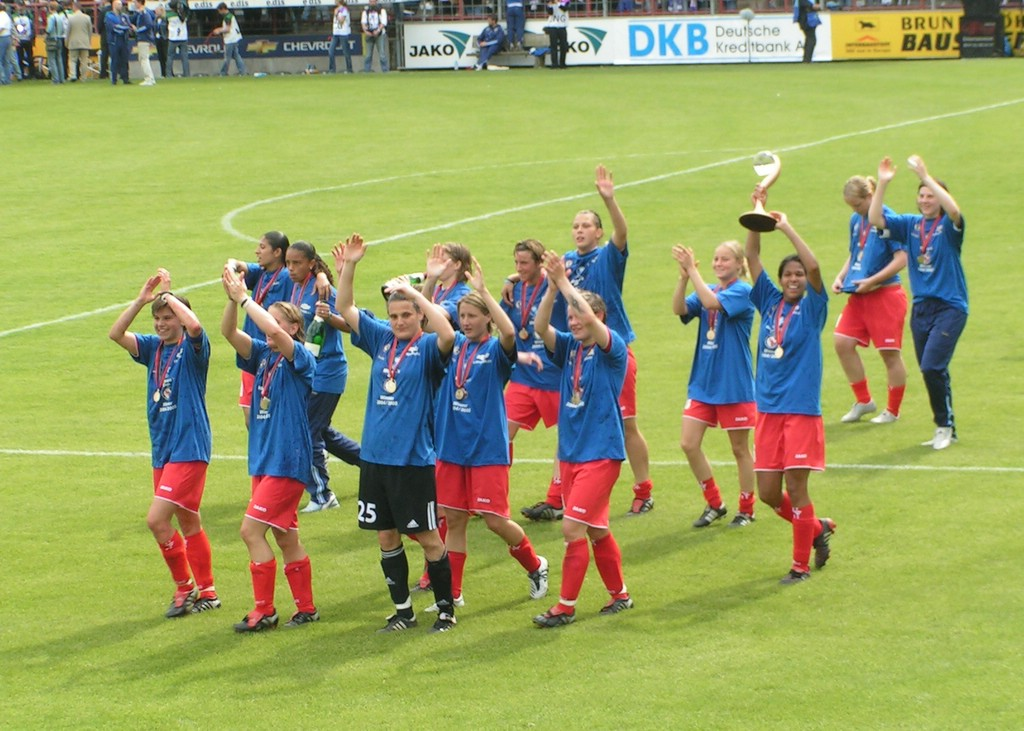
2005 champions

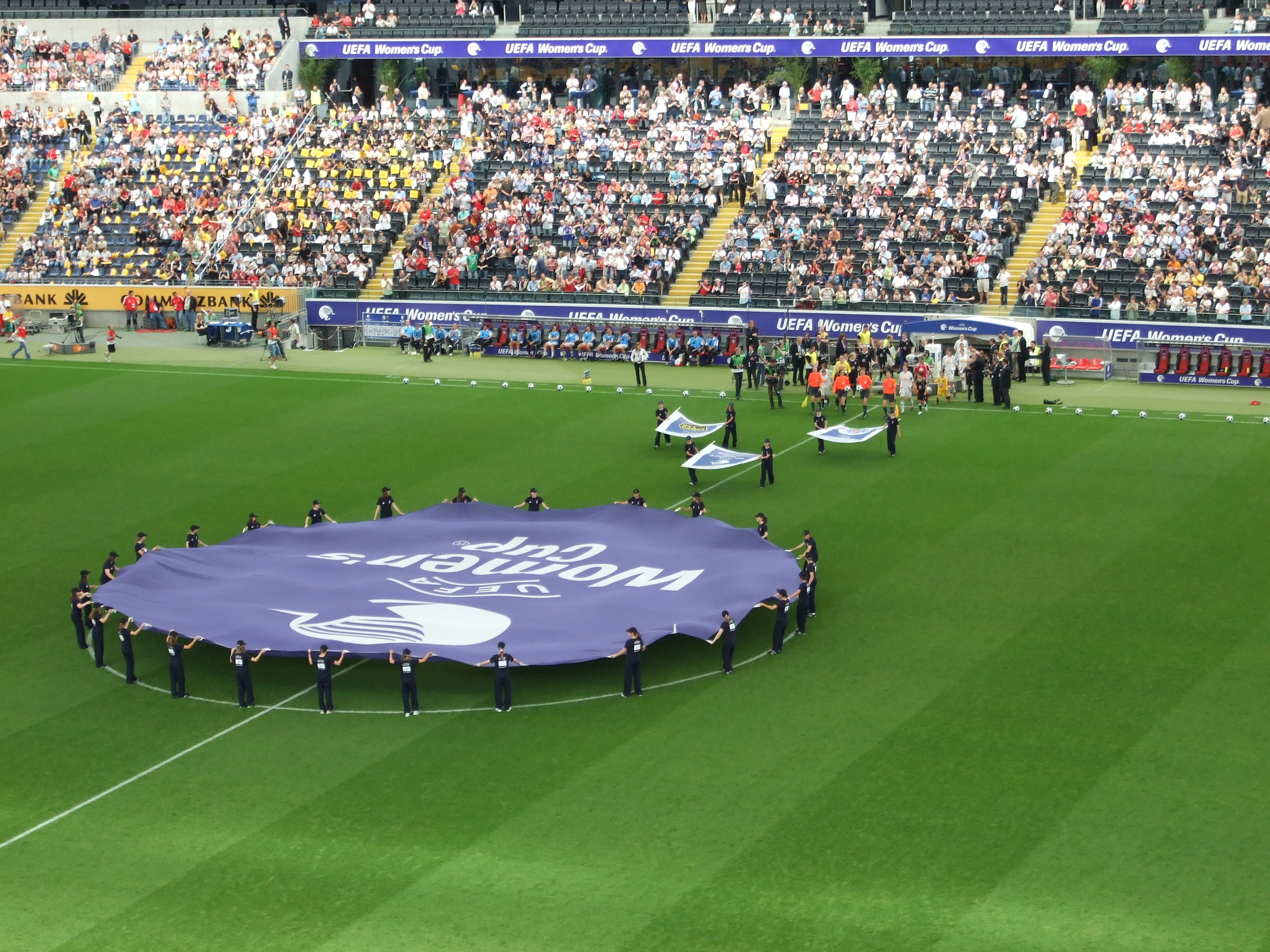
2008 final

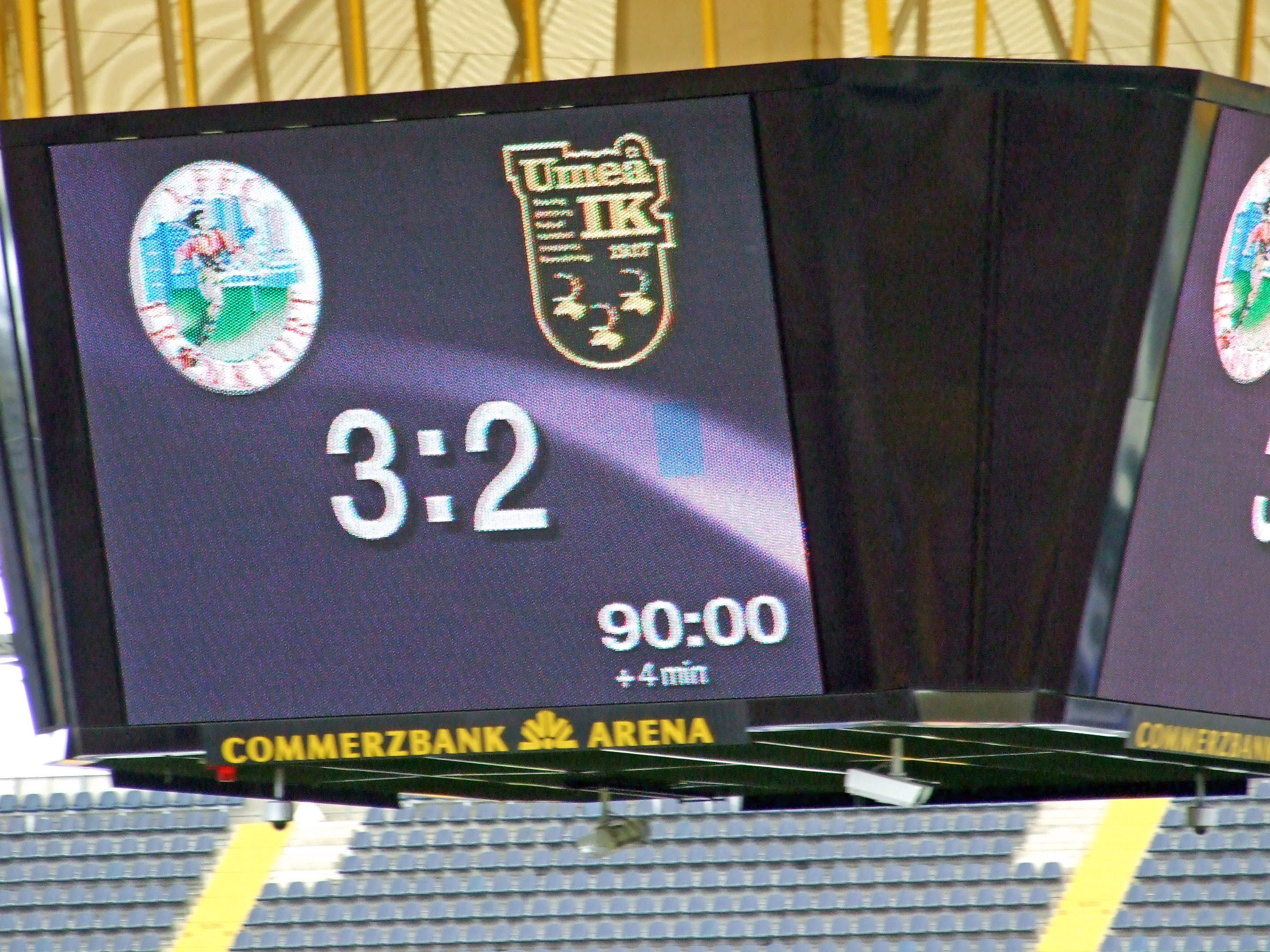
2008 final score

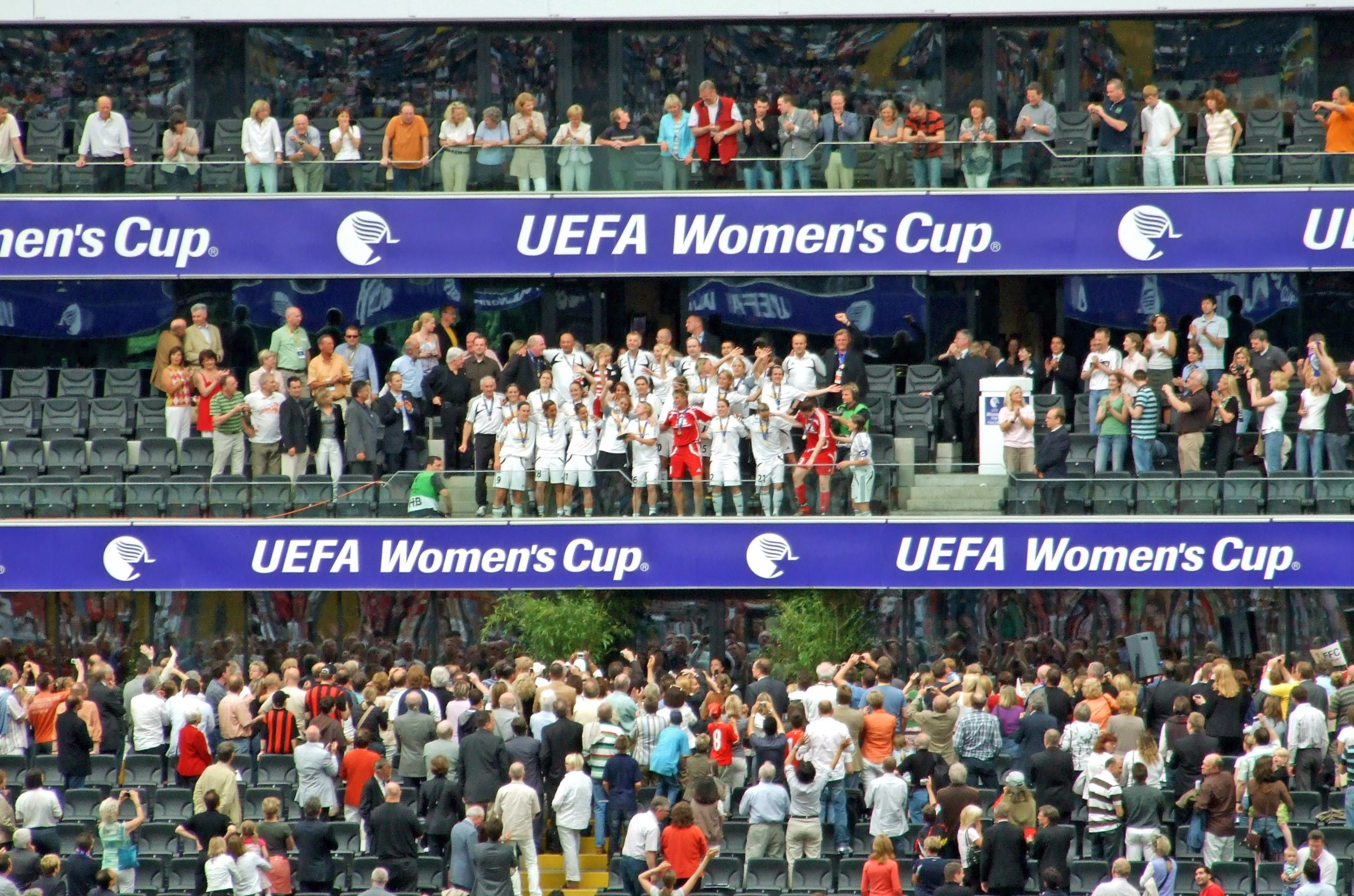
2008 champions

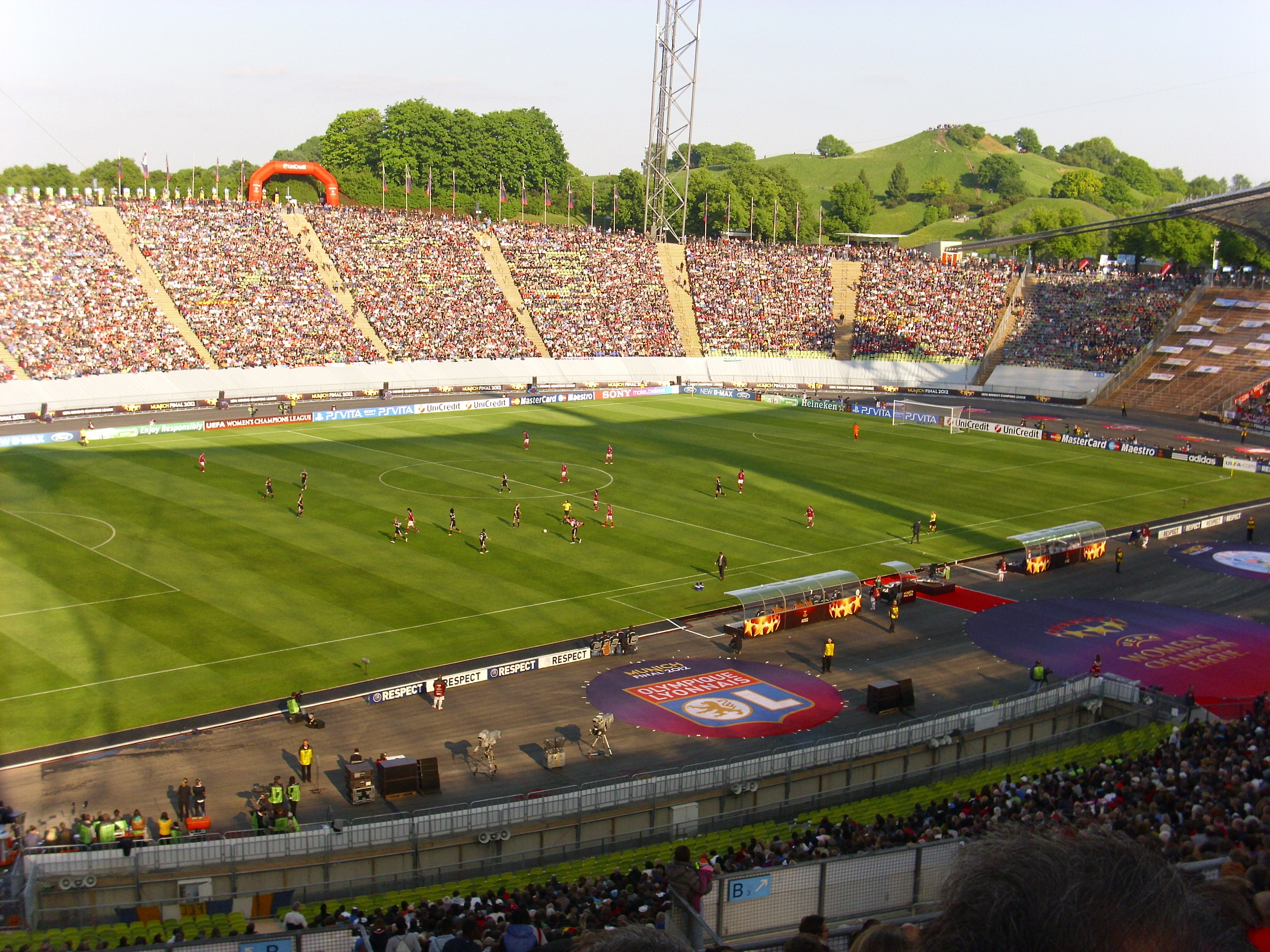
2012 final

== See also ==
- UEFA Women's Europa Cup
- FIFA Women's Champions Cup
- FIFA Women's Club World Cup
  - AFC Women's Champions League
  - CAF Women's Champions League
  - CONCACAF W Champions Cup
  - Copa Libertadores Femenina
  - OFC Women's Champions League
- UEFA Champions League
