= Sandrine Rouquet =

French association football player (born 1983)

Personal information
- Date of birth: 13 May 1983 (age 43)
- Position: Forward

Senior career*
Years	Team	Apps	(Gls)
- Toulouse

International career
2001	France	6	(0)
- * Club domestic league appearances and goals

Sandrine Rouquet is a former football player who played as a forward for French club Toulouse of the Division 1 Féminine.

== International career ==
Rouquet represented France 6 times in 2001. Rouquest also participated at the 2002 UEFA Women's Under-19 Championship.
