= 2005–06 UEFA Women's Cup qualifying round =

European football club tournament round

Tournament details
- Dates: 9 August–17 September 2005
- Teams: 43

The 2005–06 UEFA Women's Champions League qualifying round was played on 9, 11, 13 August 2005 and 13, 15 and 17 September 2005. A total of 43 teams competed in the qualifying round to decide the 8 places in the knockout phase of the 2005–06 UEFA Women's Cup.

== First qualifying round ==
=== Group A1 ===
Matches were played in Sintra, Portugal.

Pos	Team	Pld	W	D	L	GF	GA	GD	Pts	Qualification	MON	DEZ	CAR	GLE
1	(France) Montpellier	3	3	0	0	11	0	+11	9	Advance to second qualifying round	—	–	2–0	8–0
2	(Portugal) 1.º de Dezembro (H)	3	2	0	1	10	1	+9	6		0–1	—	3–0	–
3	(Wales) Cardiff City	3	1	0	2	3	5	−2	3		–	–	—	3–0
4	(Northern Ireland) Glentoran	3	0	0	3	0	18	−18	0		–	0–7	–	—

Source: RSSSF
(H) Hosts
9 August 2005

Montpellier (France)	8–0	(Northern Ireland) Glentoran
Ramos 7', 31'; Bompastor 13', 48'; Faisandier 20'; Hamou Maamar 22', 44', 45'	Report

Estádio do Real SC, Queluz
9 August 2005

1.º de Dezembro (Portugal)	3–0	(Wales) Cardiff City
Pinto 7'; Cátia Reis 10'; Fernandes 86'	Report

Estádio do Real SC, Queluz

11 August 2005

Montpellier (France)	2–0	(Wales) Cardiff City
Soyer 18'; Faisandier 71'	Report

Joaquim Vieira Sports Complex, Agualva-Cacém
11 August 2005

Glentoran (Northern Ireland)	0–7	(Portugal) 1.º de Dezembro
	Report	Pinto 13', 87'; Fernandes 32'; Martins 57'; Rita Carneiro 85', 89'; Cátia Reis 90+1'

Joaquim Vieira Sports Complex, Agualva-Cacém

13 August 2005

1.º de Dezembro (Portugal)	0–1	(France) Montpellier
	Report	Faisandier 66'

Estádio do Real SC, Queluz
13 August 2005

Cardiff City (Wales)	3–0	(Northern Ireland) Glentoran
Harries 13'; Fishlock 32'; Jones 82'	Report

Joaquim Vieira Sports Complex, Agualva-Cacém

=== Group A2 ===
Matches were played in Zagreb, Croatia.

Pos	Team	Pld	W	D	L	GF	GA	GD	Pts	Qualification	NEU	BAR	UCD	MAK
1	(Austria) Neulengbach	3	2	1	0	10	2	+8	7	Advance to second qualifying round	—	–	5–1	5–1
2	(Italy) Bardolino	3	2	1	0	5	0	+5	7		0–0	—	–	3–0
3	(Republic of Ireland) University College Dublin	3	1	0	2	3	7	−4	3		–	0–2	—	–
4	(Croatia) Maksimir (H)	3	0	0	3	1	10	−9	0		–	–	0–2	—

Source: RSSSF
(H) Hosts
9 August 2005

Neulengbach (Austria)	5–1	(Republic of Ireland) University College Dublin
Burger 3', 37'; Gstöttner 25'; Rosana 26'; Celouch 47'	Report	Waldron 17'

Stadion Hitrec-Kacian, Zagreb
9 August 2005

Bardolino (Italy)	3–0	(Croatia) Maksimir
Brumana 59', 80'; Boni 78'	Report

Stadion Hitrec-Kacian, Zagreb

11 August 2005

Neulengbach (Austria)	5–1	(Croatia) Maksimir
Celouch 1', 34', 41'; Burger 65', 69'	Report	Pavlel 81'

Stadion Hitrec-Kacian, Zagreb
11 August 2005

University College Dublin (Republic of Ireland)	0–2	(Italy) Bardolino
	Report	Ficcarelli 67'; Brumana 87'

Stadion Hitrec-Kacian, Zagreb

13 August 2005

Bardolino (Italy)	0–0	(Austria) Neulengbach
	Report

Stadion Hitrec-Kacian, Zagreb
13 August 2005

Maksimir (Croatia)	0–2	(Republic of Ireland) University College Dublin
	Report	Cohalan 7'; Pasanec 30' (o.g.)

Stadion Maksimir, Zagreb

=== Group A3 ===
Matches were played in Zeist, Netherlands.

Pos	Team	Pld	W	D	L	GF	GA	GD	Pts	Qualification	SAE	NES	WEZ	GLA
1	(Netherlands) Saestum (H)	3	2	1	0	10	2	+8	7	Advance to second qualifying round	—	1–1	2–1	–
2	(Spain) Athletic Club Neskak	3	2	1	0	10	3	+7	7		–	—	3–0	6–2
3	(Belgium) Rapide Wezemaal	3	1	0	2	6	6	0	3		–	–	—	5–1
4	(Scotland) Glasgow City	3	0	0	3	3	18	−15	0		0–7	–	–	—

Source: RSSSF
(H) Hosts
9 August 2005

Athletic Club Neskak (Spain)	6–2	(Scotland) Glasgow City
Vázquez 9', 10', 72'; Fernández 15'; Juaristi 19'; Gurrutxaga 29'	Report	Fernon 7'; Lappin 11'

Sportpark Saestum, Zeist
9 August 2005

Saestum (Netherlands)	2–1	(Belgium) Rapide Wezemaal
Louwaars 20'; van Malenstein 55'	Report	Meeus 88'

Sportpark Saestum, Zeist

11 August 2005

Athletic Club Neskak (Spain)	3–0	(Belgium) Rapide Wezemaal
Orueta 34'; Juaristi 72'; Fernández 82'	Report

Sportpark Saestum, Zeist
11 August 2005

Glasgow City (Scotland)	0–7	(Netherlands) Saestum
	Report	van Malenstein 18', 48'; Smith 53', 59'; van den Boogaard 69'; Vermeulen 79'; Louwaars 83'

Sportpark Saestum, Zeist

13 August 2005

Saestum (Netherlands)	1–1	(Spain) Athletic Club Neskak
van den Boogaard 90+4'	Report	Fernández 90+5'

Sportpark Saestum, Zeist
13 August 2005

Rapide Wezemaal (Belgium)	5–1	(Scotland) Glasgow City
Courtois 13'; Meeus 35'; Elsen 75', 77'; Verelst 84'	Report	Grant 80'

Sportpark Saestum, Zeist

=== Group A4 ===
Matches were played in Jakobstad, Finland.

Pos	Team	Pld	W	D	L	GF	GA	GD	Pts	Qualification	VAL	RØA	UNI	PAR
1	(Iceland) Valur	3	3	0	0	14	3	+11	9	Advance to second qualifying round	—	–	2–1	–
2	(Norway) Røa	3	2	0	1	13	7	+6	6		1–4	—	–	9–1
3	(Finland) United (H)	3	1	0	2	5	5	0	3		–	2–3	—	2–0
4	(Estonia) Pärnu JK	3	0	0	3	2	19	−17	0		1–8	–	–	—

Source: RSSSF
(H) Hosts
9 August 2005

Røa (Norway)	1–4	(Iceland) Valur
Stadsøy 86'	Report	Viðarsdóttir 22', 53'; Lárusdóttir 32'; Óðinsdóttir 90'

Jakobstads Centralplan, Jakobstad
9 August 2005

United (Finland)	2–0	(Estonia) Pärnu JK
Sjölund 16', 47'	Report

Jakobstads Centralplan, Jakobstad

11 August 2005

Røa (Norway)	9–1	(Estonia) Pärnu JK
Fostervold 8'; Stadsøy 38', 70', 75'; Bredland 42', 71', 76', 84', 88'	Report	Morkovkina 52'

Jakobstads Centralplan, Jakobstad
11 August 2005

Valur (Iceland)	2–1	(Finland) United
Viðarsdóttir 16', 40'	Report	Mustonen 68'

Jakobstads Centralplan, Jakobstad

13 August 2005

United (Finland)	2–3	(Norway) Røa
Mustonen 5'; Nokso-Koivisto 55'	Report	Vesterbekkmo 43' (pen.); Nordby 89' (pen.); Johansen 90+4'

Jakobstads Centralplan, Jakobstad
13 August 2005

Pärnu JK (Estonia)	1–8	(Iceland) Valur
Morkovkina 75'	Report	Óðinsdóttir 2', 28'; Ólafsdóttir 4', 90+2'; Lárusdóttir 18', 20', 62'; Sigurðardóttir 24'

Kokkolan Keskuskenttä, Kokkola

=== Group A5 ===
Matches were played in Struga, North Macedonia.

Pos	Team	Pld	W	D	L	GF	GA	GD	Pts	Qualification	LUC	CAN	KIK	SKI
1	(Switzerland) LUwin.ch	3	3	0	0	16	1	+15	9	Advance to second qualifying round	—	–	5–1	7–0
2	(Moldova) Codru Anenii Noi	3	2	0	1	8	6	+2	6		0–4	—	–	4–1
3	(Faroe Islands) KÍ Klaksvík	3	0	1	2	3	10	−7	1		–	1–4	—	–
4	(North Macedonia) Skiponjat (H)	3	0	1	2	2	12	−10	1		–	–	1–1	—

Source: RSSSF
(H) Hosts
9 August 2005

LUwin.ch (Switzerland)	5–1	(Faroe Islands) KÍ Klaksvík
Weidmann 48'; Moser 57'; Grüter 78', 79', 83'	Report	Bjartalíð 27'

Gradska Plaža Stadium, Struga
9 August 2005

Codru Anenii Noi (Moldova)	4–1	(North Macedonia) Skiponjat
Pufulete 5', 21' (pen.); Burtică 74', 75'	Report	Izeiri 7'

SRC Biljanini Izvori, Ohrid

11 August 2005

LUwin.ch (Switzerland)	7–0	(North Macedonia) Skiponjat
Meyer 27', 38', 68'; Daetwyler 36'; Graf 53'; Grüter 81', 89'	Report

Gradska Plaža Stadium, Struga
11 August 2005

KÍ Klaksvík (Faroe Islands)	1–4	(Moldova) Codru Anenii Noi
Josephsen 38'	Report	Dakii 31'; Pufulete 39'; Porosniuc 41'; Ninicu 52'

SRC Biljanini Izvori, Ohrid

13 August 2005

Codru Anenii Noi (Moldova)	0–4	(Switzerland) LUwin.ch
	Report	Grüter 28'; Meyer 62'; Moser 73'; Zürny 88'

SRC Biljanini Izvori, Ohrid
13 August 2005

Skiponjat (North Macedonia)	1–1	(Faroe Islands) KÍ Klaksvík
Mikkelsen 65' (o.g.)	Report	Ziskasson 34'

Gradska Plaža Stadium, Struga

=== Group A6 ===
Matches were played in Prague and Slaný, Czech Republic.

Pos	Team	Pld	W	D	L	GF	GA	GD	Pts	Qualification	SPR	UVI	CLU	GUN
1	(Czech Republic) Sparta Prague (H)	3	2	1	0	12	1	+11	7	Advance to second qualifying round	—	–	1–1	8–0
2	(Belarus) Universitet Vitebsk	3	1	1	1	4	5	−1	4		0–3	—	–	2–0
3	(Romania) Clujana Cluj-Napoca	3	0	3	0	5	5	0	3		–	2–2	—	–
4	(Lithuania) Gintra-Universitetas	3	0	1	2	2	12	−10	1		–	–	2–2	—

Source: RSSSF
(H) Hosts
9 August 2005

Sparta Prague (Czech Republic)	1–1	(Romania) Clujana Cluj-Napoca
Ciglbauerova 9' (pen.)	Report	Sucilă 82'

Stadion Letná, Prague
9 August 2005

Universitet Vitebsk (Belarus)	2–0	(Lithuania) Gintra-Universitetas
Lis 8'; Lutskevich 53'	Report

Stadion Pod Lipou, Roudnice nad Labem

11 August 2005

Sparta Prague (Czech Republic)	8–0	(Lithuania) Gintra-Universitetas
Ciglbauerova 36'; Šmeralová 51'; Kirjanovaitė 59'; Bertholdová 71', 87'; Došková 74'; Matysová 80'; Kohoutová 90'	Report

Městský stadio, Ostrava
11 August 2005

Clujana Cluj-Napoca (Romania)	2–2	(Belarus) Universitet Vitebsk
Spânu 29'; Striblea 81'	Report	Novikova 52'; Nikalayeva 56'

Stadion Pod Lipou, Roudnice nad Labem

13 August 2005

Universitet Vitebsk (Belarus)	0–3	(Czech Republic) Sparta Prague
	Report	Martínková 12'; Mocová 48', 90+4'

Stadion Pod Lipou, Roudnice nad Labem

Sparta Prague won 3–0 by forfeit

13 August 2005

Gintra-Universitetas (Lithuania)	2–2	(Romania) Clujana Cluj-Napoca
Jackunaitė 12', 63'	Report	Striblea 5'; Spânu 49'

Městský stadio, Ostrava

=== Group A7 ===
Matches were played in Wrocław, Poland.

Pos	Team	Pld	W	D	L	GF	GA	GD	Pts	Qualification	WRO	ARS	MHO	KOK
1	(Poland) AZS Wrocław (H)	3	3	0	0	17	0	+17	9	Advance to second qualifying round	—	5–0	–	11–0
2	(Ukraine) Arsenal Kharkiv	3	2	0	1	28	6	+22	6		–	—	8–1	–
3	(Israel) Maccabi Holon	3	1	0	2	7	9	−2	3		0–1	–	—	6–0
4	(Cyprus) AEK Kokkinochorion	3	0	0	3	0	37	−37	0		–	0–20	–	—

Source: RSSSF
(H) Hosts
9 August 2005

AZS Wrocław (Poland)	5–0	(Ukraine) Arsenal Kharkiv
Żelazko 4'; Pożerska 50'; Otrębska 53'; Żyła 78', 84'	Report

GEM Boiska, Wrocław
9 August 2005

Maccabi Holon (Israel)	6–0	(Cyprus) AEK Kokkinochorion
Jan 37', 66', 90'; Erez 75', 90+1'; Ohana 90+2'	Report

GEM Boiska, Wrocław

11 August 2005

AZS Wrocław (Poland)	11–0	(Cyprus) AEK Kokkinochorion
Pożerska 16', 59', 89'; Pawlak 20', 27', 45'; Żyła 31'; Otrębska 57', 87'; Bezdziecka 60'	Report

GEM Boiska, Wrocław
11 August 2005

Arsenal Kharkiv (Ukraine)	8–1	(Israel) Maccabi Holon
Karpenkova 4', 13'; Tatarinova 14'; Pekur 30', 34'; Michailenko 58', 81'; Rezvin 89'	Report	Jan 26'

GEM Boiska, Wrocław

13 August 2005

Maccabi Holon (Israel)	0–1	(Poland) AZS Wrocław
	Report	Janiszek 41'

GEM Boiska, Wrocław
13 August 2005

AEK Kokkinochorion (Cyprus)	0–20	(Ukraine) Arsenal Kharkiv
	Report	Djatel 2', 81', 90'; Mozolska 13'; Masalska 18', 23', 41', 46', 60'; Karpenkova 21', 26', 68', 73', 84'; Sukhorukova 28', 44', 55'; Michailenko 59', 85'; Tatarinova 71'

Olympic Stadium, Wrocław

=== Group A8 ===
Matches were played in Sarajevo, Bosnia and Herzegovina.

Pos	Team	Pld	W	D	L	GF	GA	GD	Pts	Qualification	LTO	SAR	PVFA	KRK
1	(Russia) Lada Togliatti	3	3	0	0	14	0	+14	9	Advance to second qualifying round	—	3–0	6–0	–
2	(Bosnia and Herzegovina) SFK Sarajevo (H)	3	2	0	1	2	3	−1	6		–	—	–	1–0
3	(Slovakia) PVFA	3	1	0	2	4	8	−4	3		–	0–1	—	–
4	(Slovenia) KRKA Novo Mesto	3	0	0	3	1	10	−9	0		0–5	–	1–4	—

Source: RSSSF
(H) Hosts
9 August 2005

Lada Togliatti (Russia)	3–0	(Bosnia and Herzegovina) SFK Sarajevo
Kremleva 14'; Savina 57'; Russkikh 73'	Report

Koševo City Stadium, Koševo
9 August 2005

KRKA Novo Mesto (Slovenia)	1–4	(Slovakia) PVFA
Jovanovic 6'	Report	Mackovičová 27'; Fecková 54'; Snajdarova 68', 74'

Stadion Hakija Mrso, Vogošća

11 August 2005

Lada Togliatti (Russia)	6–0	(Slovakia) PVFA
Savchenkova 53'; Kremleva 54', 73'; Savina 82', 90'; Ryzhevich 88'	Report

Koševo City Stadium, Koševo
11 August 2005

SFK Sarajevo (Bosnia and Herzegovina)	1–0	(Slovenia) KRKA Novo Mesto
Fetahović 65'	Report

Stadion Hakija Mrso, Vogošća

13 August 2005

KRKA Novo Mesto (Slovenia)	0–5	(Russia) Lada Togliatti
	Report	Zangieva 8'; Kostraba 17', 30', 33' (pen.); Savina 47'

Stadion Hakija Mrso, Vogošća
13 August 2005

(Slovakia) PVFA	0–1	(Bosnia and Herzegovina) SFK Sarajevo
	Report	Spahic 88'

Koševo City Stadium, Koševo

=== Group A9 ===
Matches were played in Sofia, Bulgaria.

Pos	Team	Pld	W	D	L	GF	GA	GD	Pts	Qualification	ALM	NSA	AEG	MTK
1	(Kazakhstan) Alma	3	2	0	1	10	3	+7	6	Advance to second qualifying round	—	5–0	2–3	–
2	(Bulgaria) NSA Sofia (H)	3	1	1	1	4	7	−3	4		–	—	–	1–1
3	(Greece) Aegina	3	1	1	1	6	7	−1	4		–	1–3	—	2–2
4	(Hungary) MTK	3	0	2	1	3	6	−3	2		0–3	–	–	—

Source: RSSSF
(H) Hosts
9 August 2005

Aegina (Greece)	2–2	(Hungary) MTK
Stojanović 45'; Katsaiti 90+5'	Report	Gál 27'; Varkonyi 82'

Struma Stadium, Simitli
9 August 2005

Alma (Kazakhstan)	5–0	NSA Sofia (Bulgaria)
Emelianova 16', 35'; Koleva 22' (o.g.); Yalova 56'; Aniskovtseva 77'	Report

Stadion Hristo Botev, Blagoevgrad

11 August 2005

Aegina (Greece)	1–3	NSA Sofia (Bulgaria)
Stojiljković 76'	Report	Kostova 24', 75', 81'

Stadion Hristo Botev, Blagoevgrad
11 August 2005

MTK (Hungary)	0–3	(Kazakhstan) Alma
	Report	Aniskovtseva 63', 78'; Svetlitskaya 74'

Struma Stadium, Simitli

13 August 2005

Alma (Kazakhstan)	2–3	(Greece) Aegina
Yalova 7'; Aniskovtseva 56'	Report	Katsaiti 17'; Lagoumtz 29'; Skordogianni 63'

Struma Stadium, Simitli
13 August 2005

NSA Sofia (Bulgaria)	1–1	(Hungary) MTK
Kostova 40'	Report	Czuder 18'

Sandanski Stadium, Sandanski

== Second qualifying round ==
=== Group B1 ===
Matches were played in Montpellier, France.

Pos	Team	Pld	W	D	L	GF	GA	GD	Pts	Qualification	TPO	MON	SAE	NEU
1	(Germany) Turbine Potsdam	3	2	1	0	14	1	+13	7	Advance to quarter-finals	—	0–0	2–0	–
2	(France) Montpellier (H)	3	2	1	0	6	1	+5	7	Advance to quarter-finals	–	—	–	4–0
3	(Netherlands) Saestum	3	1	0	2	5	7	−2	3		–	1–2	—	–
4	(Austria) Neulengbach	3	0	0	3	4	20	−16	0		1–12	–	3–4	—

Source: RSSSF
(H) Hosts
13 September 2005

Neulengbach (Austria)	1–12	(Germany) Turbine Potsdam
Graf 25'	Report	Wimbersky 10', 12', 50', 87'; Hingst 24'; Mittag 29', 45', 74'; Kerschowski 35'; Omilade 38'; Carlson 71' (pen.); Thomas 90+5'

Stade Joseph-Blanc, Villeneuve-lès-Maguelone
13 September 2005

Saestum (Netherlands)	1–2	(France) Montpellier
Smith 48'	Report	Lattaf 16'; Faisandier 63'

Stade Joseph-Blanc, Villeneuve-lès-Maguelone

15 September 2005

Turbine Potsdam (Germany)	2–0	(Netherlands) Saestum
Wimbersky 77'; Hingst 83'	Report

Stade Joseph-Blanc, Villeneuve-lès-Maguelone
15 September 2005

Montpellier (France)	4–0	(Austria) Neulengbach
Faisandier 1'; Lattaf 23', 75'; Thomis 85'	Report

Stade Joseph-Blanc, Villeneuve-lès-Maguelone

17 September 2005

Neulengbach (Austria)	3–4	(Netherlands) Saestum
Burger 42', 51'; Brand 90'	Report	Dijkhuizen 8'; Smith 65'; van Malenstein 84'; Louwaars 89'

Stade Joseph-Blanc, Villeneuve-lès-Maguelone
17 September 2005

Turbine Potsdam (Germany)	0–0	(France) Montpellier
	Report

Stade Joseph-Blanc, Villeneuve-lès-Maguelone

=== Group B2 ===
Matches were played in Stockholm, Sweden.

Pos	Team	Pld	W	D	L	GF	GA	GD	Pts	Qualification	DJU	VAL	ALM	MCN
1	(Sweden) Djurgården (H)	3	3	0	0	12	1	+11	9	Advance to quarter-finals	—	2–1	3–0	–
2	(Iceland) Valur	3	2	0	1	12	2	+10	6	Advance to quarter-finals	–	—	–	3–0
3	(Kazakhstan) Alma	3	1	0	2	5	14	−9	3		–	0–8	—	–
4	(Serbia and Montenegro) Masinac Classic Niš	3	0	0	3	3	15	−12	0		0–7	–	3–5	—

Source: RSSSF
(H) Hosts
13 September 2005

Masinac Classic Niš (Serbia and Montenegro)	3–5	(Kazakhstan) Alma
Ivanović 10' (pen.); Sretenović 34'; Mishabskaya 65' (o.g.)	Report	Yalova 45+2', 88'; Aniskovtseva 52', 54'; Emelianova 77'

Tunavallen, Eskilstuna
13 September 2005

Djurgården (Sweden)	2–1	(Iceland) Valur
Johansson 25'; Svensson 90+1'	Report	Ólafsdóttir 36'

Tunavallen, Eskilstuna

15 September 2005

Valur (Iceland)	3–0	(Serbia and Montenegro) Masinac Classic Niš
Logadóttir 47'; Viðarsdóttir 56', 79'	Report

Tunavallen, Eskilstuna
15 September 2005

Djurgården (Sweden)	3–0	(Kazakhstan) Alma
Thunebro 15'; Svensson 89'; Johansson 90+1'	Report

Tunavallen, Eskilstuna

17 September 2005

Masinac Classic Niš (Serbia and Montenegro)	0–7	(Sweden) Djurgården
	Report	Svensson 7'; Bengtsson 9'; Johansson 13'; Thunebro 21'; Nykvist 35', 44'; James 89'

Tunavallen, Eskilstuna
17 September 2005

Alma (Kazakhstan)	0–8	(Iceland) Valur
	Report	Viðarsdóttir 2', 7', 80', 90+3'; Sigurðardóttir 5', 37'; Aniskovtseva 15' (o.g.); Stefánsdóttir 78'

Skogsängens IP, Eskilstuna

=== Group B3 ===
Matches were played in Luzern, Switzerland.

Pos	Team	Pld	W	D	L	GF	GA	GD	Pts	Qualification	FRA	SPR	LUC	GBA
1	(Germany) Frankfurt	3	2	1	0	16	2	+14	7	Advance to quarter-finals	—	1–1	4–0	–
2	(Czech Republic) Sparta Prague	3	2	1	0	5	1	+4	7	Advance to quarter-finals	–	—	1–0	–
3	(Switzerland) LUwin.ch (H)	3	1	0	2	5	5	0	3		–	–	—	5–0
4	(Azerbaijan) Gömrükçü Baku	3	0	0	3	1	19	−18	0		1–11	0–3	–	—

Source: RSSSF
(H) Hosts
13 September 2005

(Germany) Frankfurt	4–0	(Switzerland) LUwin.ch
Lingor 10' (pen.); Prinz 55'; Garefrekes 63'; Hartel 88'	Report

Stadion Auf Tribschen, Lucerne
13 September 2005

(Azerbaijan) Gömrükçü Baku	0–3	(Czech Republic) Sparta Prague
	Report	Mocová 2'; Matysová 30'; Mouchová 88'

Stadion Gersag, Emmen

15 September 2005

(Germany) Frankfurt	1–1	(Czech Republic) Sparta Prague
Smisek 62'	Report	Ringelová 88'

Stadion Auf Tribschen, Lucerne
15 September 2005

(Switzerland) LUwin.ch	5–0	(Azerbaijan) Gömrükçü Baku
Weidmann 20'; Moser 30'; Meyer 33'; Daetwyler 36', 67'	Report

Stadion Gersag, Emmen

17 September 2005

(Azerbaijan) Gömrükçü Baku	1–11	(Germany) Frankfurt
Girkhlarova 87'	Report	Prinz 8', 10', 40'; Wunderlich 13', 18', 38', 47'; Garefrekes 17', 33'; Kliehm 20' (pen.); Hartel 83'

Stadion Gersag, Emmen
17 September 2005

(Czech Republic) Sparta Prague	1–0	(Switzerland) LUwin.ch
Bertholdová 39'	Report

Stadion Auf Tribschen, Lucerne

=== Group B4 ===
Matches were played in Copenhagen, Denmark.

Pos	Team	Pld	W	D	L	GF	GA	GD	Pts	Qualification	BRØ	ARS	LTO	WRO
1	(Denmark) Brøndby (H)	3	3	0	0	6	1	+5	9	Advance to quarter-finals	—	1–0	2–0	–
2	(England) Arsenal	3	2	0	1	4	2	+2	6	Advance to quarter-finals	–	—	1–0	3–1
3	(Russia) Togliatti	3	0	1	2	3	6	−3	1		–	–	—	3–3
4	(Poland) AZS Wrocław	3	0	1	2	5	9	−4	1		1–3	–	–	—

Source: RSSSF
(H) Hosts
13 September 2005

Arsenal (England)	3–1	(Poland) AZS Wrocław
Sanderson 17'; McArthur 23'; Ludlow 75'	Report	Otrebska 84'

Brøndby Idrætsanlæg, Brøndbyvester
13 September 2005

Brøndby (Denmark)	2–0	(Russia) Togliatti
Paaske Sørensen 44', 61'	Report

Brøndby Idrætsanlæg, Brøndbyvester

15 September 2005

Arsenal (England)	1–0	(Russia) Togliatti
Ludlow 77'	Report

Brøndby Idrætsanlæg, Brøndbyvester
15 September 2005

AZS Wrocław (Poland)	1–3	(Denmark) Brøndby
Maciaszczyk 77' (pen.)	Report	Kjær Jensen 64', 82' (pen.); Jørgensen 72'

Brøndby Idrætsanlæg, Brøndbyvester

17 September 2005

Brøndby (Denmark)	1–0	(England) Arsenal
Kjær Jensen 65'	Report

Brøndby Stadium, Brøndbyvester
17 September 2005

Togliatti (Russia)	3–3	(Poland) AZS Wrocław
Kremleva 17'; Ryzhevich 46'; Savina 51'	Report	Żyła 14'; Pożerska 33' (pen.), 59'

Brøndby Idrætsanlæg, Brøndbyvester
