= 2005 in Norwegian football =

Football in Norway
- Season: 2005

Men's football
- Tippeligaen: Vålerenga
- 1. divisjon: Stabæk
- 2. divisjon: Sarpsborg Sparta (Group 1); Manglerud Star (Group 2); Viking 2 (Group 3); Tromsdalen (Group 4)
- Cupen: Molde

Women's football
- Toppserien: Kolbotn
- 1. divisjon: Arna-Bjørnar
- Cupen: Asker

The 2005 season was the 100th season of competitive football in Norway.

== Men's football ==
=== League season ===
==== Tippeligaen ====
Vålerenga won the 2005 Tippeligaen, while Aalesunds FK and FK Bodø/Glimt were relegated. Molde FK had to play two qualification matches against Moss from the 1. divisjon. Molde won the qualification matches and maintained their position in Tippeligaen.

The greatest surprises of the 2005 season were the performance of IK Start, promoted to the Tippeligaen in the 2004 season and ended up winning silver, and the performance of Rosenborg BK which fought against relegation from the Tippeligaen after winning it for 13 straight seasons.

The season ended on a sad note as Fredrikstad's Dagfinn Enerly got a serious neck injury in the last round match against Start.

Pos	Team	Pld	W	D	L	GF	GA	GD	Pts	Qualification or relegation
1	Vålerenga (C)	26	13	7	6	40	27	+13	46	Qualification for the Champions League second qualifying round
2	Start	26	13	6	7	47	35	+12	45	Qualification for the UEFA Cup first qualifying round
3	Lyn	26	12	8	6	37	21	+16	44	Qualification for the UEFA Cup first qualifying round
4	Lillestrøm	26	12	6	8	37	31	+6	42	
5	Viking	26	12	5	9	37	32	+5	41	
6	Brann	26	10	7	9	43	32	+11	37	Qualification for the UEFA Cup first qualifying round (Note: Brann qualified for the UEFA Cup first qualifying round through the UEFA Fair Play ranking award.)
7	Rosenborg	26	10	4	12	50	42	+8	34	
8	Tromsø	26	8	10	8	31	30	+1	34	
9	Odd Grenland	26	9	6	11	28	51	−23	33	
10	Ham-Kam	26	8	7	11	31	37	−6	31	
11	Fredrikstad	26	8	7	11	35	44	−9	31	
12	Molde (Note: Molde qualified for the UEFA Cup second qualifying round as winners of the Norwegian Cup.) (O)	26	8	6	12	40	46	−6	30	UEFA Cup second qualifying round and relegation play-offs
13	Aalesund (R)	26	6	9	11	30	42	−12	27	Relegation to First Division
14	Bodø/Glimt (R)	26	6	6	14	29	45	−16	24	Relegation to First Division

Source: fotball.no
Rules for classification: 1) points; 2) goal difference; 3) number of goals scored.
(C) Champions; (O) Play-off winners; (R) Relegated

==== 1. divisjon ====
Pos	Team	Pld	W	D	L	GF	GA	GD	Pts	Promotion or relegation
1	Stabæk (C, P)	30	20	7	3	63	23	+40	67	Promotion to Tippeligaen
2	Sandefjord (P)	30	19	5	6	58	37	+21	62	Promotion to Tippeligaen
3	Moss	30	17	7	6	54	30	+24	58	Qualification for the promotion play-offs
4	Hønefoss BK	30	17	5	8	52	41	+11	56	
5	Bryne	30	14	8	8	55	33	+22	50	
6	Pors Grenland	30	13	11	6	47	45	+2	50	
7	Sogndal	30	11	8	11	47	51	−4	41	
8	Strømsgodset	30	11	7	12	46	45	+1	40	
9	Hødd	30	10	7	13	53	54	−1	37	
10	Kongsvinger	30	11	4	15	41	48	−7	37	
11	Follo	30	8	10	12	40	47	−7	34	
12	Løv-Ham	30	9	4	17	31	47	−16	31	
13	Mandalskameratene (R)	30	7	8	15	41	54	−13	29	Relegation to Second Division
14	Skeid (R)	30	8	5	17	39	58	−19	29	Relegation to Second Division
15	Tønsberg (R)	30	6	7	17	36	56	−20	25	Relegation to Second Division
16	Alta (R)	30	5	5	20	28	62	−34	20	Relegation to Second Division

Source: nifs.no
Rules for classification: 1) points; 2) goal difference; 3) number of goals scored.
(C) Champions; (P) Promoted; (R) Relegated

==== 2. divisjon ====
===== Group 1 =====
Pos	Team	Pld	W	D	L	GF	GA	GD	Pts	Promotion or relegation
1	Sarpsborg Sparta (P)	26	21	1	4	90	28	+62	64	Promotion to First Division
2	Vard Haugesund	26	19	3	4	88	27	+61	60	
3	Notodden	26	16	1	9	74	36	+38	49	
4	Bærum	26	14	6	6	66	42	+24	48	
5	Drøbak/Frogn	26	13	0	13	64	41	+23	39	
6	Groruddalen	26	11	6	9	61	49	+12	39	
7	Tollnes	26	11	4	11	49	46	+3	37	
8	Ørn-Horten	26	12	1	13	34	67	−33	37	
9	Sprint-Jeløy	26	9	4	13	45	61	−16	31	
10	Sarpsborg	26	9	1	16	45	60	−15	28	
11	Odd Grenland 2	26	8	4	14	35	55	−20	28	
12	Mercantile (R)	26	8	1	17	31	91	−60	25	Relegation to Third Division
13	Kvik Halden (R)	26	6	5	15	38	52	−14	23	Relegation to Third Division
14	Fram Larvik (R)	26	4	5	17	25	90	−65	17	Relegation to Third Division

Source: RSSSF
(P) Promoted; (R) Relegated

===== Group 2 =====
Pos	Team	Pld	W	D	L	GF	GA	GD	Pts	Promotion or relegation
1	Manglerud Star (P)	26	19	3	4	82	29	+53	60	Promotion to First Division
2	Raufoss	26	18	4	4	68	34	+34	58	
3	Nybergsund	26	16	5	5	57	26	+31	53	
4	Lørenskog	26	13	6	7	67	38	+29	45	
5	Ullensaker/Kisa	26	11	6	9	41	40	+1	39	
6	Molde 2	26	10	5	11	58	59	−1	35	
7	Eidsvold Turn	26	9	7	10	45	49	−4	34	
8	Gjøvik-Lyn	26	10	4	12	36	44	−8	34	
9	Kjelsås	26	10	4	12	41	53	−12	34	
10	Lillestrøm 2	26	9	6	11	42	53	−11	33	
11	Brumunddal	26	9	3	14	48	58	−10	30	
12	Træff (R)	26	7	4	15	40	57	−17	25	Relegation to Third Division
13	Frigg (R)	26	6	3	17	44	77	−33	21	Relegation to Third Division
14	FF Lillehammer (R)	26	4	2	20	26	78	−52	14	Relegation to Third Division

Source: RSSSF
(P) Promoted; (R) Relegated

===== Group 3 =====
Pos	Team	Pld	W	D	L	GF	GA	GD	Pts	Promotion or relegation
1	Viking 2	26	17	5	4	46	19	+27	56	
2	Haugesund (Note: Haugesund was promoted because Viking 2, being a B team, was ineligible for promotion.) (P)	26	14	9	3	65	31	+34	51	Promotion to First Division
3	Flekkerøy	26	15	5	6	49	32	+17	50	
4	Sandnes Ulf	26	11	9	6	57	43	+14	42	
5	Fyllingen	26	11	7	8	45	33	+12	40	
6	Ålgård	26	10	5	11	48	40	+8	35	
7	Årdal	26	10	4	12	34	44	−10	34	
8	Stord/Moster	26	9	6	11	39	47	−8	33	
9	Åsane	26	10	3	13	36	47	−11	33	
10	Fana	26	10	3	13	37	50	−13	33	
11	Klepp	26	7	8	11	32	43	−11	29	
12	Egersund (R)	26	5	8	13	34	51	−17	23	Relegation to Third Division
13	Hovding (R)	26	6	5	15	39	64	−25	23	Relegation to Third Division
14	Brann 2 (R)	26	5	7	14	45	62	−17	22	Relegation to Third Division

Source: RSSSF
(P) Promoted; (R) Relegated

===== Group 4 =====
Pos	Team	Pld	W	D	L	GF	GA	GD	Pts	Promotion or relegation
1	Tromsdalen (P)	26	17	4	5	64	34	+30	55	Promotion to First Division
2	Mo	26	15	2	9	59	44	+15	47	
3	Levanger	26	14	4	8	68	45	+23	46	
4	Strindheim	26	13	6	7	65	39	+26	45	
5	Steinkjer	26	14	1	11	64	62	+2	43	
6	Skarp	26	13	4	9	61	60	+1	43	
7	Byåsen	26	13	3	10	69	44	+25	42	
8	Ranheim	26	11	5	10	63	54	+9	38	
9	Harstad	26	9	8	9	46	47	−1	35	
10	Rosenborg 2	26	10	2	14	51	59	−8	32	
11	Kolstad	26	8	4	14	43	62	−19	28	
12	Lyngen/Karnes (R)	26	8	1	17	55	89	−34	25	Relegation to Third Division
13	Lofoten (R)	26	7	2	17	40	89	−49	23	Relegation to Third Division
14	Innstranden (R)	26	5	4	17	30	50	−20	19	Relegation to Third Division

Source: RSSSF
(P) Promoted; (R) Relegated

=== Norwegian Cup ===
==== Bracket ====
Round of 16
1	Bodø/Glimt	1
1	Molde	2
1	Odd Grenland	6
2	Alta IF	0
1	Rosenborg	1
2	Hønefoss	2
1	Ham-Kam	2
2	Bryne FK	0
1	Viking	0
1	Lillestrøm	2
1	Stabæk	4
1	Fredrikstad	2
1	Start	1(2)
1	Vålerenga (a.e.t.)	1(3)
1	Brann	3
1	Aalesund	2

Quarter-finals
1	Molde	2
1	Odd Grenland	1
2	Hønefoss	4
1	Ham-Kam	0
1	Lillestrøm	3
2	Stabæk	1
1	Vålerenga	2
1	Brann	1

Semi-finals
1	Molde	1
2	Hønefoss	0
1	Lillestrøm	2
1	Vålerenga	0

Final
1	Molde (a.e.t.)	2(4)
1	Lillestrøm	2(2)

==== Final ====
Molde beat Lillestrøm 4–2 (after extra time) in the final held November 6 at Ullevaal Stadion.

6 November 2005
13:15 CET (UTC+1)

Molde	4–2 (a.e.t.)	Lillestrøm
Friend 25'; Konate 65'; Berg Hestad 94'; Husøy 108'	Report	Mouelhi 46'; Sundgot 90' (pen.)

Ullevaal Stadion, Oslo
Attendance: 25,182
Referee: Brage Sandmoen (Kjelsås)

== Women's football ==
=== League season ===
==== Toppserien ====
Kolbotn won the league in front of Team Strømmen and Fløya. Kattem were relegated together with Asker who was forcibly relegated due to economic license issues.

Pos	Team	Pld	W	D	L	GF	GA	GD	Pts	Qualification or relegation
1	Kolbotn (C)	18	14	3	1	72	15	+57	45	Qualification for the UEFA Women's Cup second qualifying round
2	Team Strømmen	18	12	3	3	44	22	+22	39	
3	Fløya	18	10	3	5	49	26	+23	33	
4	Trondheims-Ørn	18	10	3	5	31	17	+14	33	
5	Klepp	18	8	5	5	39	24	+15	29	
6	Røa	18	9	1	8	35	28	+7	28	
7	Asker (Note: Asker was forcibly relegated due to economic license issues.) (R)	18	7	3	8	34	30	+4	24	Relegation to First Division
8	Sandviken	18	4	3	11	25	58	−33	15	
9	Liungen	18	2	1	15	19	76	−57	7	
10	Kattem (R)	18	1	1	16	20	72	−52	4	Relegation to First Division

Source: NIFS
Rules for classification: 1) points; 2) goal difference; 3) number of goals scored.
(C) Champions; (R) Relegated

==== 1. divisjon ====
Arna-Bjørnar and Amazon Grimstad were promoted to Toppserien.

=== Norwegian Women's Cup ===
==== Final ====
- Asker 4–0 (a.e.t.) Team Strømmen

== Men's UEFA competitions ==
=== Norwegian representatives ===
- Rosenborg (UEFA Champions League)
- Vålerenga (UEFA Champions League)
- Brann (UEFA Cup)
- Tromsø (UEFA Cup)
- Viking (UEFA Cup)

=== Champions League ===
==== Qualifying rounds ====
===== Second qualifying round =====
Team 1	Agg.	Team 2	1st leg	2nd leg
Vålerenga (Norway)	5–1	(Finland) Haka	1–0	4–1

===== Third qualifying round =====
Team 1	Agg.	Team 2	1st leg	2nd leg
Vålerenga (Norway)	1–1 (3–4 p)	(Belgium) Club Brugge	1–0	0–1
Steaua București (Romania)	3–4	(Norway) Rosenborg	1–1	2–3

==== Group stage ====
===== Group F =====
Pos	Team	Pld	W	D	L	GF	GA	GD	Pts	Qualification	LYO	RMA	ROS	OLY
1	(France) Lyon	6	5	1	0	13	4	+9	16	Advance to knockout stage	—	3–0	2–1	2–1
2	(Spain) Real Madrid	6	3	1	2	10	8	+2	10	Advance to knockout stage	1–1	—	4–1	2–1
3	(Norway) Rosenborg	6	1	1	4	6	11	−5	4	Transfer to UEFA Cup	0–1	0–2	—	1–1
4	(Greece) Olympiacos	6	1	1	4	7	13	−6	4		1–4	2–1	1–3	—

Source: RSSSF

=== UEFA Cup ===
==== Qualifying rounds ====
===== First qualifying round =====
Team 1	Agg.	Team 2	1st leg	2nd leg
Portadown (Northern Ireland)	1–3	(Norway) Viking	1–2	0–1

===== Second qualifying round =====
Team 1	Agg.	Team 2	1st leg	2nd leg
Brann (Norway)	2–0	(Finland) AC Allianssi	0–0	2–0
Rhyl (Wales)	1–3	(Norway) Viking	0–1	1–2
Esbjerg (Denmark)	1–1 (2–3 p)	(Norway) Tromsø	0–1	1–0 (a.e.t.)

==== First round ====
Team 1	Agg.	Team 2	1st leg	2nd leg
Brann (Norway)	3–5	(Russia) Lokomotiv Moscow	1–2	2–3
Tromsø (Norway)	2–1	(Turkey) Galatasaray	1–0	1–1
Vålerenga (Norway)	1–6	(Romania) Steaua București	0–3	1–3
Viking (Norway)	2–2 (a)	Austria Wien	1–0	1–2

==== Group stage ====
===== Group A =====
Pos	Team	Pld	W	D	L	GF	GA	GD	Pts	Qualification	MON	HSV	SLA	VIK	CSS
1	(France) Monaco	4	3	0	1	6	2	+4	9	Advance to knockout stage	—	2–0	—	—	2–1
2	(Germany) Hamburger SV	4	3	0	1	5	2	+3	9	Advance to knockout stage	—	—	2–0	2–0	—
3	(Czech Republic) Slavia Prague	4	1	1	2	6	8	−2	4	Advance to knockout stage	0–2	—	—	—	4–2
4	(Norway) Viking	4	1	1	2	3	6	−3	4		1–0	—	2–2	—	—
5	(Bulgaria) CSKA Sofia	4	1	0	3	5	7	−2	3		—	0–1	—	2–0	—

===== Group E =====
Pos	Team	Pld	W	D	L	GF	GA	GD	Pts	Qualification	STR	ROM	BSL	RSB	TRO
1	(France) Strasbourg	4	2	2	0	7	3	+4	8	Advance to knockout stage	—	—	—	2–2	2–0
2	(Italy) Roma	4	2	1	1	7	6	+1	7	Advance to knockout stage	1–1	—	3–1	—	—
3	(Switzerland) Basel	4	2	0	2	7	9	−2	6	Advance to knockout stage	0–2	—	—	—	4–3
4	(Serbia and Montenegro) Red Star Belgrade	4	1	1	2	7	8	−1	4		—	3–1	1–2	—	—
5	(Norway) Tromsø	4	1	0	3	7	9	−2	3		—	1–2	—	3–1	—

==== Knockout stage ====
===== Round of 32 =====
Team 1	Agg.	Team 2	1st leg	2nd leg
Rosenborg (Norway)	1–4	(Russia) Zenit St. Petersburg	0–2	1–2

=== Intertoto Cup ===
No Norwegian representative this season.

== UEFA Women's Cup ==
=== First qualifying round ===
==== Group 4 ====
Pos	Team	Pld	W	D	L	GF	GA	GD	Pts	Qualification	VAL	RØA	UNI	PAR
1	(Iceland) Valur	3	3	0	0	14	3	+11	9	Advance to second qualifying round	—	–	2–1	–
2	(Norway) Røa	3	2	0	1	13	7	+6	6		1–4	—	–	9–1
3	(Finland) United (H)	3	1	0	2	5	5	0	3		–	2–3	—	2–0
4	(Estonia) Pärnu JK	3	0	0	3	2	19	−17	0		1–8	–	–	—

Source: RSSSF
(H) Hosts

Matches

Røa – Valur 1–4
Røa – Pärnu JK 9–1
United Jakobstad – Røa 2–3

== National teams ==
=== Norway men's national football team ===
Date	Venue	Opponent	Res.*	Comp.	Norwegian goalscorers
January 22	Kuwait National Stadium, Kuwait City	Kuwait	1–1	F	Raymond Kvisvik
January 25	Bahrain National Stadium, Manama	Bahrain	1–0	F	Raymond Kvisvik
January 28	Amman stadium, Amman	Jordan	0–0	F
February 9	Ta'Qali Stadium, Valletta	Malta	3–0	F	Sigurd Rushfeldt (2), John Arne Riise
March 30	Stadionul Republican, Chişinău	Moldova	0–0	WCQ5
April 20	A. le Coq Arena, Tallinn	Estonia	2–1	F	Frode Johnsen, Daniel Braaten
May 24	Ullevaal Stadion, Oslo	Costa Rica	1–0	F	Frode Johnsen
June 4	Ullevaal Stadion, Oslo	Italy	0–0	WCQ5
June 8	Råsunda Stadium, Solna	Sweden	3–2	F	Eddie Gustafsson (og) Thorstein Helstad, Steffen Iversen
August 17	Ullevaal Stadion, Oslo	Switzerland	0–2	F
September 3	Arena Petrol, Celje	Slovenia	3–2	WCQ5	John Carew, Claus Lundekvam, Morten Gamst Pedersen
September 7	Ullevaal Stadion, Oslo	Scotland	0–2	WCQ5
October 8	Ullevaal Stadion, Oslo	Moldova	1–0	WCQ5	Sigurd Rushfeldt
October 12	Dinamo Stadium, Minsk	Belarus	1–0	WCQ5	Thorstein Helstad
November 12	Ullevaal Stadion, Oslo	Czech Republic	0–1	WCQP
November 16	Toyota Arena, Prague	Czech Republic	0–1	WCQP

* Norway's goals first

Explanation:

- og = own goal
- F= Friendly
- WCQ5 = World Cup 2006 qualifier, European zone, group 5
- WCQP = World Cup 2006 qualifier, European zone, playoff
