= 2017 Algarve Cup =

International women's football tournament

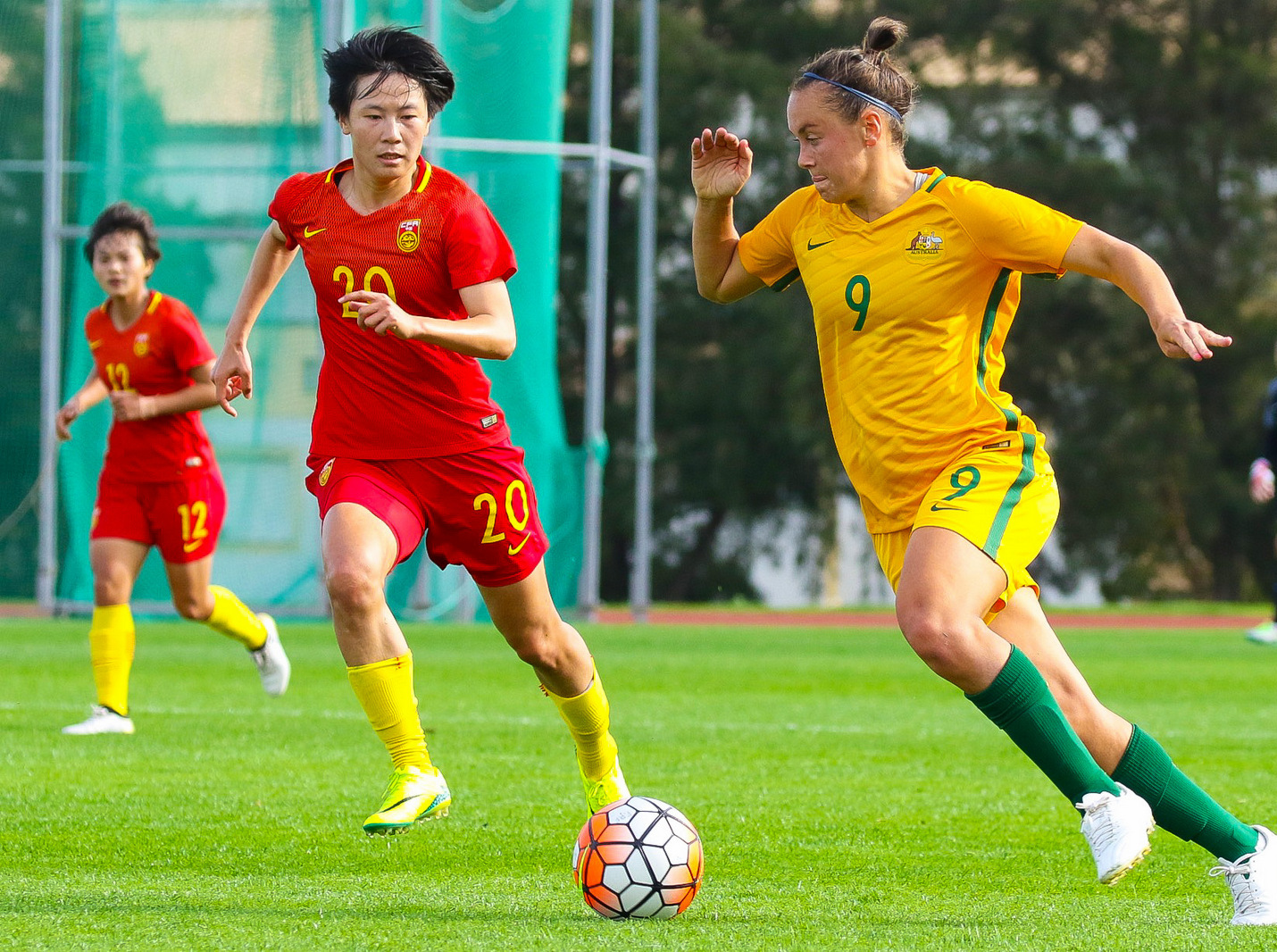

Tournament details
- Host country: Portugal
- Dates: 1–8 March
- Teams: 12 (from 3 confederations)
- Venues: 5 (in 5 host cities)

Final positions
- Champions: Spain (1st title)
- Runners-up: Canada
- Third place: Denmark
- Fourth place: Australia

Tournament statistics
- Matches played: 24
- Goals scored: 58 (2.42 per match)
- Top scorer(s): (Denmark) Pernille Harder (Japan) Kumi Yokoyama (4 goals each)
- Best player: (Spain) Irene Paredes
- Fair play award: Japan

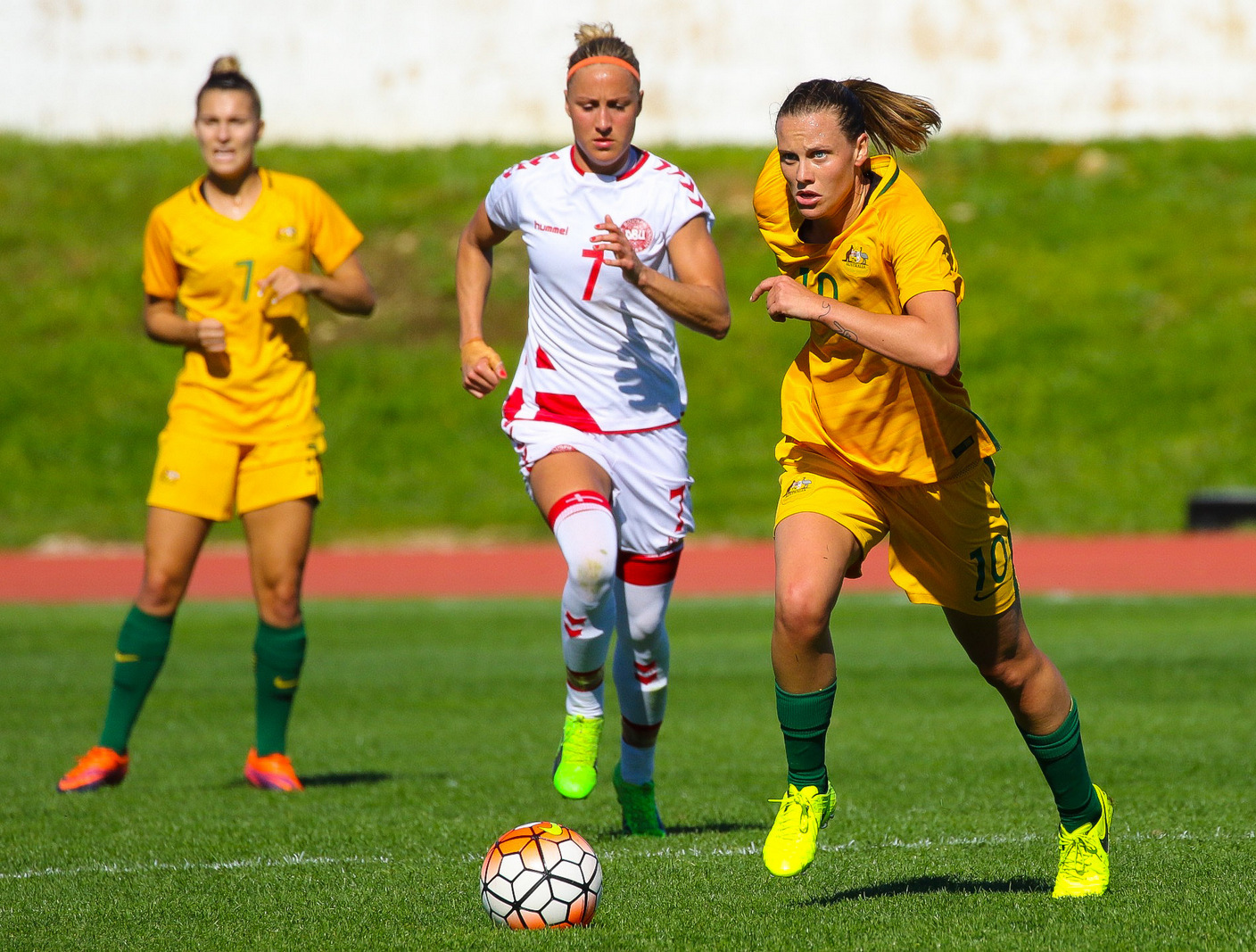
Emily-van-Egmond-2-2017-algarve

The 2017 Algarve Cup was the 24th edition of the Algarve Cup, an invitational women's football tournament held annually in Portugal. It took place from 1 to 8 March.

== Format ==
The twelve invited teams were split into three groups that played a round-robin tournament.

Points awarded in the group stage followed the standard formula of three points for a win, one point for a draw and zero points for a loss. In the case of two teams being tied on the same number of points in a group, their head-to-head result determined the higher place.

== Teams ==
Team	FIFA Rankings (December 2016)
Canada	4
Australia	6
Japan	7
Sweden	8
Norway	11
Netherlands	12
China	13
Spain	14
Denmark	15
Iceland	20
Russia	23
Portugal	38

== Venues ==
- Albufeira Municipal Stadium, Albufeira
- Bela Vista Municipal Stadium, Parchal
- Estádio Algarve
- Lagos Municipal Stadium, Lagos
- VRS António Sports Complex, Vila Real de Santo António

== Referees ==
Confederation	Referees	Assistant referees
AFC	(Australia) Casey Reibelt (Japan) Yoshimi Yamashita	(Australia) Renae Coghill Gi (Australia) Allyson Flynn (Japan) Makoto Bozono (Japan) Malko Hagio
CAF	(Rwanda) Mukansanga Salima (Senegal) Fatou Thioune (Tanzania) Kabakama Jonesla	(Kenya) Mary Njoroge Gi (Malawi) Bernadettar Kwimbira (Mali) Fanta Kone (Mauritius) Queency Victoire
CONCACAF	(Costa Rica) Marianela Araya (United States) Katja Koroleva	(Costa Rica) Kimberly Moreira (Mexico) Yudillia Briones (United States) Felisha Mariscal (United States) Kathryn Nesbitt
CONMEBOL	(Argentina) Laura Fortunato (Brazil) Edina Alves Batista	(Argentina) Dalana Milone (Brazil) Tatiane Sacilotti (Chile) Leslie Vasquez (Colombia) Mary Cristina Blanco
OFC		(New Zealand) Sarah Jones (Samoa) Maria Tamalelagi
UEFA	(Germany) Riem Hussein (Portugal) Sandra Braz (Russia) Anastasia Pustovoitova	(Bulgaria) Ekaterina Marinova (England) Lisa Rashid (Germany) Christina Biehl (Russia) Ekaterina Kurochkina (Scotland) Kylie McMullan (Spain) Rocío Puente

== Group stage ==
The groups were announced on 18 November 2016,
All times WET (UTC±00:00).

=== Tie-breaking criteria ===
For the group stage of this tournament, where two or more teams in a group tied on an equal number of points, the finishing positions were determined by the following tie-breaking criteria in the following order:

1. number of points obtained in the matches among the teams in question
2. goal difference in all the group matches
3. number of goals scored in all the group matches
4. fair-play ranking in all the group matches
5. FIFA ranking

=== Group A ===
Team	Pld	W	D	L	GF	GA	GD	Pts
Canada	3	2	1	0	3	1	+2	7
Denmark	3	2	0	1	12	2	+10	6
Russia	3	1	0	2	3	8	−5	3
Portugal	3	0	1	2	0	7	−7	1

1 March 2017
15:00

Portugal	0–1	Russia
	Report	Mashina 82'

Lagos Municipal Stadium, Lagos
Referee: Katja Koroleva (United States)
1 March 2017
18:30

Denmark	0–1	Canada
	Report	Sinclair 90'

Albufeira Municipal Stadium, Albufeira
Referee: Casey Reibelt (Australia)

3 March 2017
15:00

Russia	1–2	Canada
Makarenko 58'	Report	Schmidt 10'; Sinclair 26'

Estádio Algarve
Referee: Markus Räber (Switzerland)
3 March 2017
19:00

Portugal	0–6	Denmark
	Report	S. Larsen 11', 32'; L. Jensen 9'; Troelsgaard 25', 68'; Veje 59'

Bela Vista Municipal Stadium, Parchal
Referee: Yoshimi Yamashita (Japan)

6 March 2017
19:00

Russia	1–6	Denmark
Chernomyrdina 45+3'	Report	Harder 25' (pen.), 59', 72'; N. Sørensen 70'; S. Hansen 82', 89'

VRS António Sports Complex, Vila Real de Santo António
Referee: Casey Reibelt (Australia)
6 March 2017
19:00

Canada	0–0	Portugal
	Report

Estádio Algarve
Referee: Jonesla Kabakama (Tanzania)

=== Group B ===
Team	Pld	W	D	L	GF	GA	GD	Pts
Spain	3	2	1	0	5	1	+4	7
Japan	3	2	0	1	5	2	+3	6
Iceland	3	0	2	1	1	3	−2	2
Norway	3	0	1	2	1	6	−5	1

1 March 2017
14:45

Japan	1–2	Spain
Yokoyama 81'	Report	Meseguer 59'; O. García 72'

Bela Vista Municipal Stadium, Parchal
Referee: Edina Alves Batista (Brazil)
1 March 2017
18:30

Norway	1–1	Iceland
Hegerberg 4'	Report	Jónsdóttir 8'

Bela Vista Municipal Stadium, Parchal
Referee: Jonesla Kabakama (Tanzania)

3 March 2017
14:45

Japan	2–0	Iceland
Hasegawa 11', 17'	Report

Bela Vista Municipal Stadium, Parchal
Referee: Fatou Thioune (Senegal)
3 March 2017
18:30

Spain	3–0	Norway
Thorisdottir 24' (o.g.); Hermoso 38'; O. García 40'	Report

Estádio Algarve
Referee: Laura Fortunato (Argentina)

6 March 2017
14:45

Norway	0–2	Japan
	Report	Yokoyama 59', 89'

Estádio Algarve
Referee: Marianela Araya (Costa Rica)
6 March 2017
14:45

Iceland	0–0	Spain
	Report

VRS António Sports Complex, Vila Real de Santo António
Referee: Salima Mukansanga (Rwanda)

=== Group C ===
Team	Pld	W	D	L	GF	GA	GD	Pts
Australia	3	2	0	1	5	4	+1	6
Netherlands	3	2	0	1	4	3	+1	6
Sweden	3	1	1	1	1	1	0	4
China	3	0	1	2	1	3	−2	1

1 March 2017
15:00

Netherlands	1–0	China
Jansen 13'	Report

Lagos Municipal Stadium, Lagos
Referee: Marianela Araya (Costa Rica)
1 March 2017
18:30

Australia	0–1	Sweden
	Report	Schelin 60'

Albufeira Municipal Stadium, Albufeira
Referee: Yoshimi Yamashita (Japan)

3 March 2017
15:00

Australia	3–2	Netherlands
Gielnik 16', 31'; Kennedy 45'	Report	Miedema 75'; Spitse 79'

VRS António Sports Complex, Vila Real de Santo António
Referee: Salima Mukansanga (Rwanda)
3 March 2017
18:30

China	0–0	Sweden
	Report

VRS António Sports Complex, Vila Real de Santo António
Referee: Anastasia Pustovoitova (Russia)

6 March 2017
15:00

China	1–2	Australia
Sha. Wang 36'	Report	Gielnik 61'; Carpenter 84'

Albufeira Municipal Stadium, Albufeira
Referee: Riem Hussein (Germany)
6 March 2017
15:00

Sweden	0–1	Netherlands
	Report	van den Berg 81' (pen.)

Lagos Municipal Stadium, Lagos
Referee: Edina Alves Batista (Brazil)

=== Ranking of teams for placement matches ===
The ranking of the 1st, 2nd, 3rd, and 4th placed teams in each group to determine the placement matches:

- 1st placed teams

Pos	Grp	Team	Pld	W	D	L	GF	GA	GD	Pts	Qualification
1	B	Spain	3	2	1	0	5	1	+4	7	Final
2	A	Canada	3	2	1	0	3	1	+2	7	Final
3	C	Australia	3	2	0	1	5	4	+1	6	Third-place match

- 2nd placed teams

Pos	Grp	Team	Pld	W	D	L	GF	GA	GD	Pts	Qualification
1	A	Denmark	3	2	0	1	12	2	+10	6	Third-place match
2	B	Japan	3	2	0	1	5	2	+3	6	Fifth-place match
3	C	Netherlands	3	2	0	1	4	3	+1	6	Fifth-place match

- 3rd placed teams

Pos	Grp	Team	Pld	W	D	L	GF	GA	GD	Pts	Qualification
1	C	Sweden	3	1	1	1	1	1	0	4	Seventh-place match
2	A	Russia	3	1	0	2	3	8	−5	3	Seventh-place match
3	B	Iceland	3	0	2	1	1	3	−2	2	Ninth-place match

- 4th placed teams

Pos	Grp	Team	Pld	W	D	L	GF	GA	GD	Pts	Qualification
1	C	China	3	0	1	2	1	3	−2	1	Ninth-place match
2	B	Norway	3	0	1	2	1	6	−5	1	Eleventh-place match
3	A	Portugal	3	0	1	2	0	7	−7	1	Eleventh-place match

== Placement matches ==
=== 11th Place ===
8 March 2017
14:45

Norway	2–0	Portugal
Isaksen 13'; Reiten 66'	Report

Bela Vista Municipal Stadium, Parchal
Referee: Fatou Thioune (Senegal)

=== 9th Place ===
8 March 2017
18:30

Iceland	2–1	China
Sigurðardóttir 9', 47'	Report	Sha. Wang 36'

Bela Vista Municipal Stadium, Parchal
Referee: Laura Fortunato (Argentina)

=== 7th Place ===
8 March 2017
18:30

Sweden	4–0	Russia
Asllani 6', 35'; Fischer 9'; Rolfö 77'	Report

Albufeira Municipal Stadium, Albufeira
Referee: Riem Hussein (Germany)

=== 5th Place ===
8 March 2017
14:45

Japan	2–3	Netherlands
Yokoyama 20'; Van den Bulk 77' (o.g.)	Report	Dekker 13'; Martens 19'; Utsugi 90+3' (o.g.)

Estádio Algarve
Referee: Anastasia Pustovoitova (Russia)

=== 3rd Place ===
8 March 2017
14:45

Australia	1–1	Denmark
K. Simon 36'	Report	Harder 80'
Penalties
Kellond-Knight (penalty scored); Polkinghorne (penalty missed); Kerr (penalty missed)	1–4	(penalty scored) Røddik Hansen; (penalty scored) Petersen; (penalty scored) Larsen; (penalty scored) Troelsgaard

Albufeira Municipal Stadium, Albufeira
Referee: Katja Koroleva (United States)

=== Final ===
8 March 2017
18:30

Spain	1–0	Canada
Ouahabi 5'	Report

Estádio Algarve
Referee: Yoshimi Yamashita (Japan)

== Final standings ==
Pos	Grp	Team	Pld	W	D	L	GF	GA	GD	Pts
1	B	Spain	4	3	1	0	6	1	+5	10
2	A	Canada	4	2	1	1	3	2	+1	7
3	A	Denmark	4	2	1	1	13	3	+10	7
4	C	Australia	4	2	1	1	6	5	+1	7
5	C	Netherlands	4	3	0	1	7	5	+2	9
6	B	Japan	4	2	0	2	7	5	+2	6
7	C	Sweden	4	2	1	1	5	1	+4	7
8	A	Russia	4	1	0	3	3	12	−9	3
9	B	Iceland	4	1	2	1	3	4	−1	5
10	C	China	4	0	1	3	2	5	−3	1
11	B	Norway	4	1	1	2	3	6	−3	4
12	A	Portugal	4	0	1	3	0	9	−9	1

Tournament's best player	Team
Irene Paredes	Spain

Fair play award
Japan

== Goalscorers ==
4 goals

- (Denmark) Pernille Harder
- (Japan) Kumi Yokoyama

3 goals

- (Australia) Emily Gielnik

2 goals

- (Canada) Christine Sinclair
- (China) Wang Shanshan
- (Denmark) Sarah Hansen
- (Denmark) Stine Larsen
- (Denmark) Sanne Troelsgaard Nielsen
- (Iceland) Málfríður Erna Sigurðardóttir
- (Japan) Yui Hasegawa
- (Spain) Olga García
- (Sweden) Kosovare Asllani

1 goal

- (Australia) Ellie Carpenter
- (Australia) Alanna Kennedy
- (Australia) Kyah Simon
- (Canada) Sophie Schmidt
- (Denmark) Line Jensen
- (Denmark) Nicoline Sørensen
- (Denmark) Katrine Veje
- (Iceland) Gunnhildur Yrsa Jónsdóttir
- (Netherlands) Mandy van den Berg
- (Netherlands) Anouk Dekker
- (Netherlands) Renate Jansen
- (Netherlands) Lieke Martens
- (Netherlands) Vivianne Miedema
- (Netherlands) Sherida Spitse
- (Norway) Ada Hegerberg
- (Norway) Ingvild Isaksen
- (Norway) Guro Reiten
- (Russia) Margarita Chernomyrdina
- (Russia) Daria Makarenko
- (Russia) Olesya Mashina
- (Spain) Jennifer Hermoso
- (Spain) Silvia Meseguer
- (Spain) Leila Ouahabi
- (Sweden) Nilla Fischer
- (Sweden) Fridolina Rolfö
- (Sweden) Lotta Schelin

Own goal

- (Japan) Rumi Utsugi (playing against Netherlands)
- (Netherlands) Sheila van den Bulk (playing against Japan)
- (Norway) Maria Thorisdottir (playing against Spain)
