= Alicja Pawlak =

Polish footballer

Personal information
- Full name: Alicja Pawlak
- Date of birth: 13 October 1983 (age 43)
- Place of birth: Poland
- Position: Defender

Senior career*
Years	Team	Apps	(Gls)
2000–2010	AZS Wrocław		(26)
2011–2012	Unia Racibórz		

International career
2005–2012	Poland	37	(0)
- * Club domestic league appearances and goals

Alicja Pawlak (born 13 October 1983) is a Polish football referee and former player who played as a defender. She has played the Champions League with AZS Wrocław, where she played for a decade, and Unia.

She was a member of the Poland national team from 2005 to 2012.

== Career statistics ==
=== International ===
Appearances and goals by national team and year
National team	Year	Apps	Goals
Poland	2005	7	0
Poland	2006	2	0
Poland	2008	4	0
Poland	2009	7	0
Poland	2010	8	0
Poland	2011	8	0
Poland	2012	1	0
Total		37	0

== Honours ==
AZS Wrocław

- Ekstraliga: 2000–01, 2001–02, 2002–03, 2003–04, 2004–05, 2005–06, 2006–07, 2007–08
- Polish Cup: 2002–03, 2003–04, 2006–07

Unia Racibórz

- Ekstraliga: 2010–11, 2011–12
- Polish Cup: 2010–11, 2011–12
