= Susanne Hartel =

German footballer

Personal information
- Date of birth: 2 February 1988 (age 38)
- Place of birth: Mannheim, Germany
- Height: 1.69 m (5 ft 7 in)
- Position: Striker

Team information
- Current team: SC Freiburg
- Number: 7

Youth career
- 1992–2002: MFC 08 Lindenhof
- 2002–2003: Viktoria Neckarhausen
- 2003–2004: 1. FFC Frankfurt

Senior career*
Years	Team	Apps	(Gls)
2004–2007	1. FFC Frankfurt	13	(2)
2007–	SC Freiburg	39	(20)

International career^{‡}
	Germany (U15)	2	(0)
2005	Germany (U17)	2	(2)
2006–2007	Germany (U19)	12	(4)
2008	Germany (U20)	1	(0)
2008–	Germany (U23)	12	(2)
- * Club domestic league appearances and goals as of 30 June 2010 ‡ National team caps and goals as of 30 June 2010

Susanne Hartel (born 2 February 1988 in Mannheim) is a former German football player.

== Career ==
=== Club football ===
She began her career at the age of three with MFC 08 Lindenhof. In 2002, she had to change clubs due to regulations in Germany, which prohibit girls from playing with boys once they are older than 14. At that time, her current club did not have a girls' team. She joined Viktoria Neckarhausen, where she stayed for one and a half years.

In 2003, the striker transferred to 1. FFC Frankfurt. She played for the junior team until the age of 16, after which she joined the first team, competing in the Bundesliga, the German Cup and the UEFA Women's Cup.

In 2007, she joined SC Freiburg, immediately earning a place in the starting eleven. During the 2008-09 season, she finished seventh in the league's top scorer rankings, scoring 12 goals in 17 matches.

Honours:

- UEFA Women's Cup-Winner 2006
- German Champion 2005 and 2007
- German Cup Winner 2007
- DFB-Hallenpokal Winner 2006

=== National team ===
She earned her first cap with the Germany under-15 team, for which she played twice. After that, she scored two goals in two caps for the Germany under-17 team.

For the Germany under-19 team, with which she became European Champion in 2007, she played twelve times and scored four goals. Her most important goal was the decisive 3-2 in the extra time of the championship semi-final against France, which Germany eventually won 4-2.

Afterwards, she made one appearance for the Germany under-20 team.

Most recently, she was part of the Germany under-23 team, for which she had played twelve matches and scored two goals to date.

Honours:

- Under-19 European Champion 2007

== Personal life ==
She has cited Birgit Prinz and Torsten Frings as role models.
