= 2005–06 UEFA Women's Cup knockout phase =

Tournament details
- Dates: 08 October 2005 – 27 May 2006
- Teams: 8

The 2005–06 UEFA Women's Cup knockout phase began on 8 October 2005 and concluded on 20 and 27 May 2006 with the two legged tie at the Karl-Liebknecht-Stadion in Potsdam, Germany and PSD Bank Arena in Frankfurt, Germany to decide the champions of the 2005–06 UEFA Women's Cup. A total of 8 teams competed in the knockout phase.

== Bracket ==
Quarter-finals
(Iceland) Valur	1	1	2
(Germany) Turbine Potsdam	8	11	19
(Iceland) Sparta Prague	0	0	0
(Sweden) Djurgården	2	0	2
(England) Arsenal	1	1	2
(Germany) Frankfurt	1	3	4
(France) Montpellier	3	3	6
(Denmark) Brøndby	0	1	1

Semi-finals
(Germany) Turbine Potsdam	2	5	7
(Sweden) Djurgården	3	2	5
(Germany) Frankfurt (a)	0	3	3
(France) Montpellier	1	2	3

Final
(Germany) Turbine Potsdam	0	2	2
(Germany) Frankfurt	4	3	7

== Quarter-finals ==
Team 1	Agg.	Team 2	1st leg	2nd leg
Valur (Iceland)	2–19	(Germany) Turbine Potsdam	1–8	1–11
Sparta Prague (Czech Republic)	0–2	(Sweden) Djurgården	0–2	0–0
Arsenal (England)	2–4	(Germany) Frankfurt	1–1	1–3
Montpellier (France)	6–1	(Denmark) Brøndby	3–0	3–1

9 October 2005
15:00 (CET)

Valur (Iceland)	1–8	(Germany) Turbine Potsdam
Odansdottir 36'	Report	Johannsdottir 16' (o.g.); Mittag 45', 59'; Cristiane 62', 84'; Pohlers 65'; Thomas 83'; Wimbersky 87'

Laugardalsvöllur, Reykjavík
Referee: Gyöngyi Gaál (Hungary)
16 October 2005
15:00 (CET)

Turbine Potsdam (Germany)	11–1	(Iceland) Valur
Pohlers 3', 21', 67'; Wimbersky 9', 57'; Omilade 23'; Mittag 36', 56'; Johannsdottir 46' (o.g.); Cristiane 49'; I. Kerschowski 66'	Report	Viðarsdóttir 14'

Karl-Liebknecht-Stadion, Potsdam
Referee: Floarea Cristina Ionescu (Romania)

Turbine Potsdam won 19–2 on aggregate

11 October 2005
18:00 (CET)

Sparta Prague (Czech Republic)	0–2	(Sweden) Djurgården
	Report	Svensson 54', 70'

Sparta Stadium, Prague
Referee: Christine Frai (Germany)
19 October 2005
19:00 (CET)

Djurgården (Sweden)	0–0	(Czech Republic) Sparta Prague
	Report

Stockholms, Stockholm
Referee: Ausra Tvarijonaite (Lithuania)

Djurgården won 2–0 on aggregate

8 October 2005
14:00 (CET)

Arsenal (England)	1–1	(Germany) Frankfurt
Sanderson 45'	Report	Smisek 23'

Underhill, Barnet
Referee: Sarah Girard-Fautrel (France)
15 October 2005
14:33 (CET)

Frankfurt (Germany)	3–1	(England) Arsenal
Lingor 20' (pen.); Garefrekes 43'; Smisek 54'	Report	Grant 11'

Stadion am Brentanobad, Frankfurt
Referee: Eva Oedlund (Sweden)

Frankfurt won 4–2 on aggregate

8 October 2005
15:00 (CET)

Montpellier (France)	3–0	(Denmark) Brøndby
Lattaf 17'; Thomis 55', 83'	Report

Joseph Blanc, Villeneuve-les-Maguelone
Referee: Natalia Avdonchenko (Russia)
16 October 2005
13:00 (CET)

Brøndby (Denmark)	1–3	(France) Montpellier
Jørgensen 62'	Report	Lattaf 25'; Thomis 69'; Faisandier 74'

Brøndby Stadium, Brøndby
Referee: Anna De Toni (Italy)

Montpellier won 6–1 on aggregate

== Semi-finals ==
Team 1	Agg.	Team 2	1st leg	2nd leg
Turbine Potsdam (Germany)	7–5	(Sweden) Djurgården	2–3	5–2
Frankfurt (Germany)	3–3 (a)	(France) Montpellier	0–1	3–2

20 November 2005
15:00 (CET)

Turbine Potsdam (Germany)	2–3	(Sweden) Djurgården
Cristiane 11'; Pohlers 26'	Report	Fagerström 78'; Kalmari 86'; Svensson 90'

Karl-Liebknecht-Stadion, Potsdam
Attendance: 1,616
Referee: Claudine Brohet (Belgium)
27 November 2005
12:00 (CET)

Djurgården (Sweden)	2–5	(Germany) Turbine Potsdam
Svensson 35'; Norlin 56'	Report	Podvorica 5'; Mittag 22', 87'; Zietz 37'; Pohlers 56'

Råsunda, Solna
Attendance: 250
Referee: Anna De Toni (Italy)

Turbine Potsdam won 7–5 on aggregate

20 November 2005
14:30 (CET)

Frankfurt (Germany)	0–1	(France) Montpellier
	Report	Diguelman 50'

Stadion am Brentanobad, Frankfurt
Attendance: 4,300
Referee: Floarea Cristina Ionescu (Romania)
26 November 2005
14:30 (CET)

Montpellier (France)	2–3	(Germany) Frankfurt
Diguelman 16', 84' (pen.)	Report	Smisek 10', 49'; Lingor 37'

Joseph Blanc, Villeneuve-les-Maguelone
Attendance: 1,500
Referee: Gyöngyi Gaál (Hungary)

3–3 on aggregate. Frankfurt won on away goals.

== Final ==
Team 1	Agg.	Team 2	1st leg	2nd leg
Turbine Potsdam (Germany)	2–7	(Germany) Frankfurt	0–4	2–3

20 May 2006
16:00 (CET)

Turbine Potsdam (Germany)	0–4	(Germany) Frankfurt
	Report	Lingor 7', 84'; Albertz 64'; Garefrekes 77'

Karl-Liebknecht-Stadion, Potsdam
Attendance: 4,431
Referee: Eva Oedlund (Sweden)
27 May 2006
14:15 (CET)

Frankfurt (Germany)	3–2	(Germany) Turbine Potsdam
Jones 23'; Lingor 72' (pen.); Prinz 90+3'	Report	Pohlers 8', 35'

Bornheimer Hang, Frankfurt
Attendance: 13,200
Referee: Dagmar Damkova (Czech Republic)

UEFA Women's Cup
2005–06 winners

Frankfurt
Second title

== Top goalscorers ==
(excluding qualifying rounds)

Rank	Player	Team	Goals
1	(Germany) Conny Pohlers	Turbine Potsdam	8
2	(Germany) Anja Mittag	Turbine Potsdam	6
3	(Germany) Renate Lingor	Frankfurt	5
