= Natascha Celouch =

Austrian footballer

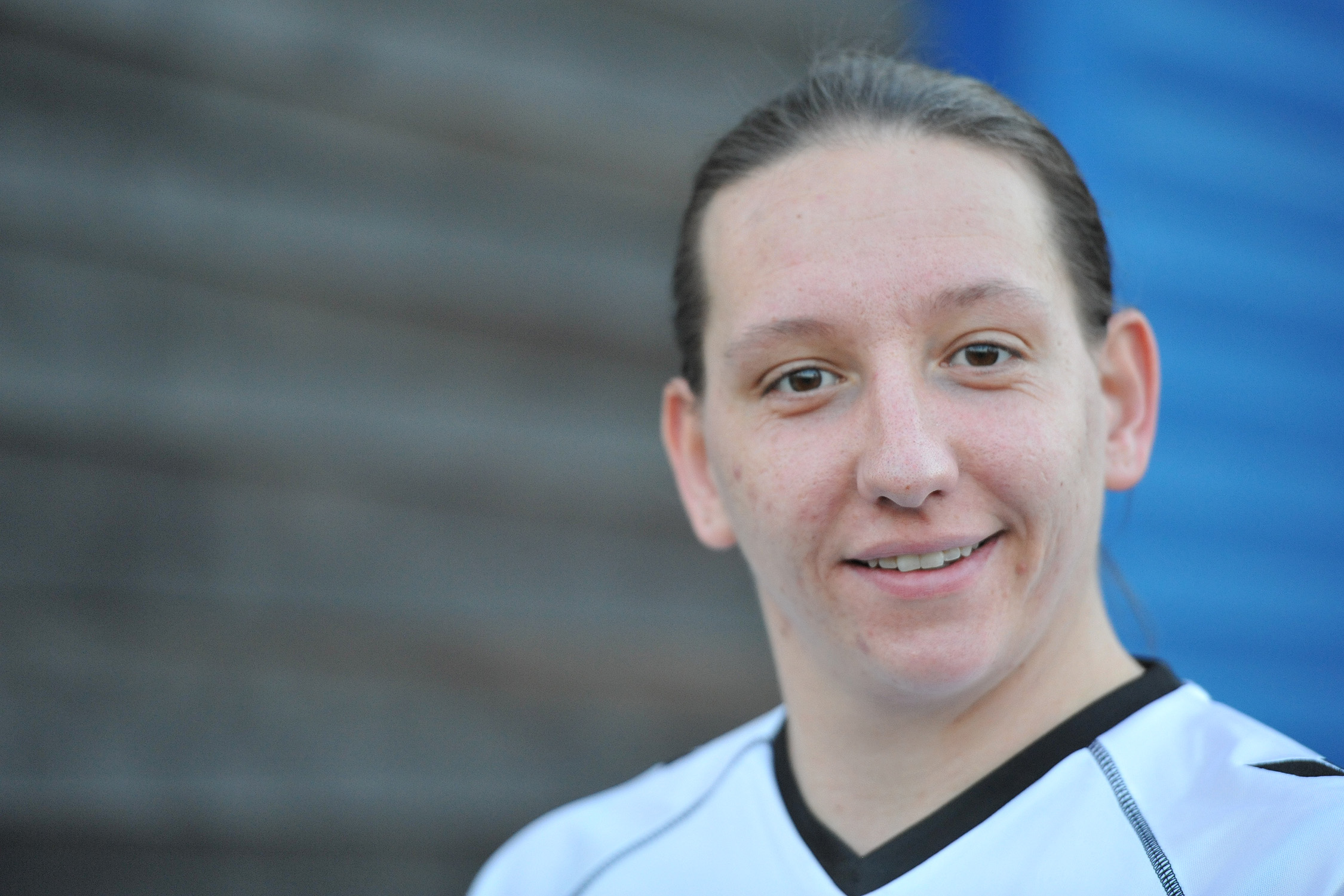

Personal information
- Full name: Natascha Celouch
- Date of birth: 15 July 1986 (age 40)
- Place of birth: Vienna, Austria
- Position: Midfielder

Senior career*
Years	Team	Apps	(Gls)
2001–	SV Neulengbach		(148)

International career
2005–2007	Austria		
- * Club domestic league appearances and goals

Natascha Celouch is an Austrian football midfielder, currently serving as SV Neulengbach's captain.

She has been a member of the Austrian national team.

== Titles ==
- Austrian league (9): 2003–2011
- Austrian cup (9): 2003–2011
