= Paula Jensen =

Faroese footballer (born 1980)

Personal information
- Full name: Paula Jensen
- Birth name: Paula Mikkelsen
- Date of birth: 28 September 1980 (age 46)
- Position: Right back

Senior career*
| Years | Team | Apps | (Gls) |
| 1995–2013 | KÍ | 304 | (19) |
| 2019 | 07 Vestur | 0 | (0) |

International career^{‡}
| 2010–2011 | Faroe Islands | 5 | (0) |
- * Club domestic league appearances and goals as of 23 May 2013 ‡ National team caps and goals as of 8 March 2011

Paula Jensen (née Mikkelsen; born 28 September 1980) is a Faroese former footballer who played as a right back. She has been a member of the Faroe Islands women's national team.
