= Isabelle Meyer =

Swiss footballer (born 1987)

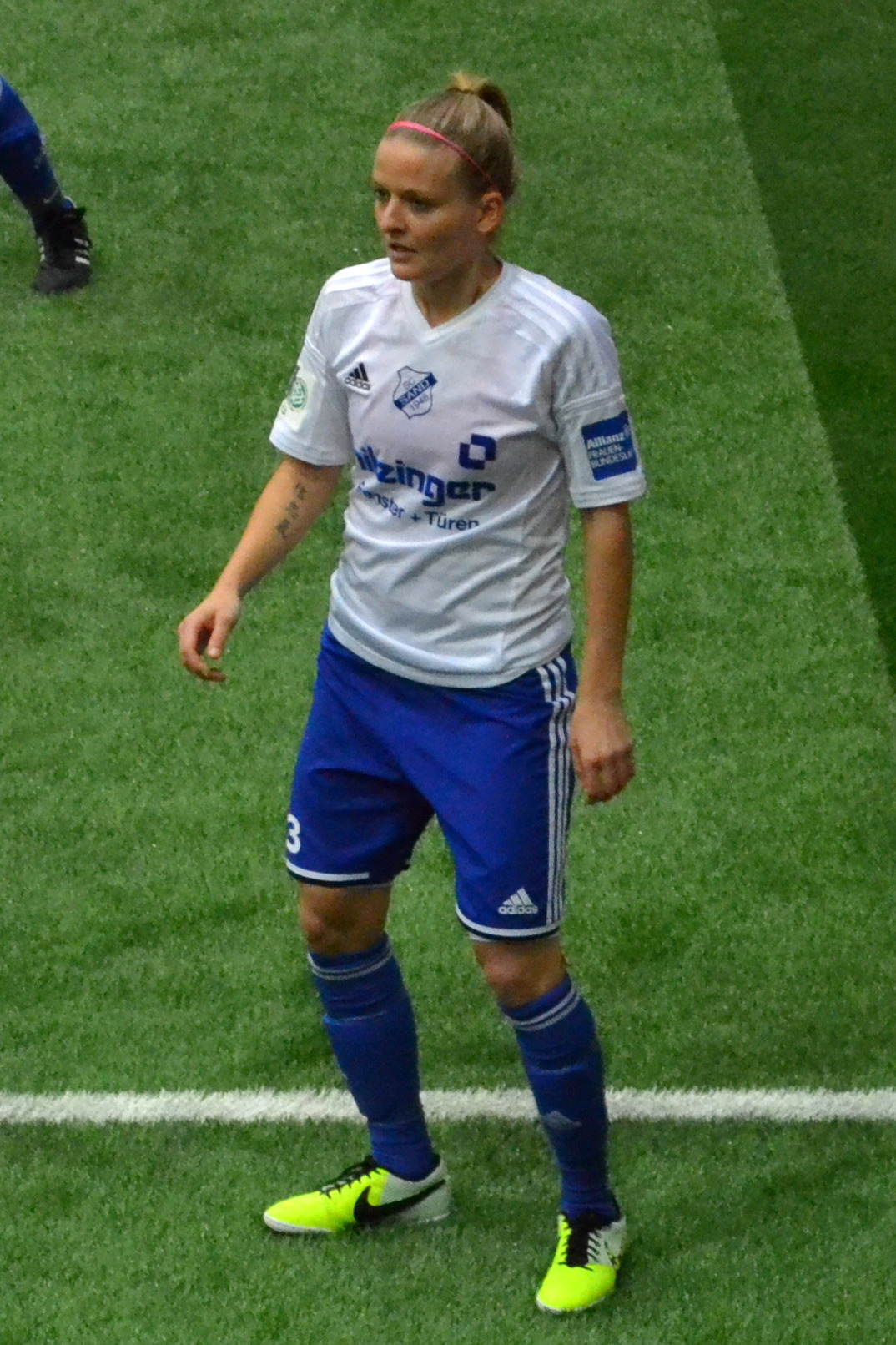

Personal information
- Full name: Isabelle Meyer
- Date of birth: 5 September 1987 (age 39)
- Place of birth: Switzerland
- Height: 1.63 m (5 ft 4 in)
- Position: Midfielder

Senior career*
Years	Team	Apps	(Gls)
2003–2007	Luzern		
2007–2010	Grasshopper		
2010–2012	Freiburg	31	(17)
2012–2019	Sand	128	(39)
2019–2025	SKN St. Pölten	76	(24)

International career
2007–2012	Switzerland	7	(0)
- * Club domestic league appearances and goals

Isabelle Meyer is a Swiss football midfielder. She previously played in the Nationalliga A for FC Luzern, with which she also played the European Cup, and Grasshopper-Club. With the SC Freiburg and SC Sand in the 1st Bundesliga and SKN St. Pölten in the Austrian ÖFB-Frauenliga. She has been a member of the Swiss national team since making her debut in April 2007 against the Czech Republic.
