= 2005–06 UEFA Women's Cup =

Tournament details
- Teams: 43 (42 associations)

Final positions
- Champions: (Germany) Frankfurt (2nd title)
- Runners-up: (Germany) Turbine Potsdam

Tournament statistics
- Top scorer(s): (Iceland) Margrét Lára Viðarsdóttir; 11 goals

The UEFA Women's Cup 2005–06 was the fifth edition of the UEFA Women's Cup football club tournament. It was won by Frankfurt in an all-German final against defending champions Turbine Potsdam for their second title in the competition.

== Teams ==
Second qualifying round
(Germany) Turbine Potsdam (TH)	(Germany) Frankfurt (CH)	(England) Arsenal (CH)	(Sweden) Djurgården (CH)
(Denmark) Brøndby (CH)	(Serbia and Montenegro) Mašinac Classic Niš (CH)	(Azerbaijan) Gömrükçü Baku (CH)	
First qualifying round
(Norway) Røa (CH)	(Czech Republic) Sparta Praha (CH)	(Spain) Athletic Club Neskak (CH)	(Iceland) Valur (CH)
(Belgium) Rapide Wezemaal (CH)	(Russia) Lada Togliatti (CH)	(Austria) Neulengbach (CH)	(France) Montpellier (CH)
(Kazakhstan) Alma (CH)	(Belarus) Universitet Vitebsk (CH)	(Switzerland) LUwin.ch (CH)	(Italy) Bardolino (CH)
(Israel) Maccabi Holon (CH)	(Netherlands) Saestum (CH)	(Bosnia and Herzegovina) ZNK-SFK 2000 (CH)	(Hungary) MTK (CH)
(Poland) AZS Wrocław (CH)	(Portugal) 1° Dezembro (CH)	(Bulgaria) NSA Sofia (CH)	(Ukraine) Arsenal Kharkiv (CH)
(Scotland) Glasgow City (CH)	(Wales) Cardiff City (CW)	(Greece) Aegina (CH)	(Lithuania) Gintra Universitetas (CH)
(Slovenia) KRKA Novo Mesto (CH)	(Romania) CFF Clujana (CH)	(Finland) United (CH)	(Slovakia) PVFA (CH)
(Moldova) Codru Anenii Noi (CH)	(Faroe Islands) KÍ Klaksvík (CH)	(North Macedonia) Skiponjat (CH)	(Republic of Ireland) University College Dublin (CW)
(Croatia) Maksimir (CH)	(Estonia) Pärnu JK (CH)	(Northern Ireland) Glentoran (CH)	(Cyprus) AEK Kokkinochorion (CH)

== Qualifying round ==
=== First qualifying round ===
==== Group A1 ====
Pos	Team	Pld	W	D	L	GF	GA	GD	Pts	Qualification	MON	DEZ	CAR	GLE
1	(France) Montpellier	3	3	0	0	11	0	+11	9	Advance to second qualifying round	—	–	2–0	8–0
2	(Portugal) 1.º de Dezembro (H)	3	2	0	1	10	1	+9	6		0–1	—	3–0	–
3	(Wales) Cardiff City	3	1	0	2	3	5	−2	3		–	–	—	3–0
4	(Northern Ireland) Glentoran	3	0	0	3	0	18	−18	0		–	0–7	–	—

Source: RSSSF
(H) Hosts

==== Group A2 ====
Pos	Team	Pld	W	D	L	GF	GA	GD	Pts	Qualification	NEU	BAR	UCD	MAK
1	(Austria) Neulengbach	3	2	1	0	10	2	+8	7	Advance to second qualifying round	—	–	5–1	5–1
2	(Italy) Bardolino	3	2	1	0	5	0	+5	7		0–0	—	–	3–0
3	(Republic of Ireland) University College Dublin	3	1	0	2	3	7	−4	3		–	0–2	—	–
4	(Croatia) Maksimir (H)	3	0	0	3	1	10	−9	0		–	–	0–2	—

Source: RSSSF
(H) Hosts

==== Group A3 ====
Pos	Team	Pld	W	D	L	GF	GA	GD	Pts	Qualification	SAE	NES	WEZ	GLA
1	(Netherlands) Saestum (H)	3	2	1	0	10	2	+8	7	Advance to second qualifying round	—	1–1	2–1	–
2	(Spain) Athletic Club Neskak	3	2	1	0	10	3	+7	7		–	—	3–0	6–2
3	(Belgium) Rapide Wezemaal	3	1	0	2	6	6	0	3		–	–	—	5–1
4	(Scotland) Glasgow City	3	0	0	3	3	18	−15	0		0–7	–	–	—

Source: RSSSF
(H) Hosts

==== Group A4 ====
Pos	Team	Pld	W	D	L	GF	GA	GD	Pts	Qualification	VAL	RØA	UNI	PAR
1	(Iceland) Valur	3	3	0	0	14	3	+11	9	Advance to second qualifying round	—	–	2–1	–
2	(Norway) Røa	3	2	0	1	13	7	+6	6		1–4	—	–	9–1
3	(Finland) United (H)	3	1	0	2	5	5	0	3		–	2–3	—	2–0
4	(Estonia) Pärnu JK	3	0	0	3	2	19	−17	0		1–8	–	–	—

Source: RSSSF
(H) Hosts

==== Group A5 ====
Pos	Team	Pld	W	D	L	GF	GA	GD	Pts	Qualification	LUC	CAN	KIK	SKI
1	(Switzerland) LUwin.ch	3	3	0	0	16	1	+15	9	Advance to second qualifying round	—	–	5–1	7–0
2	(Moldova) Codru Anenii Noi	3	2	0	1	8	6	+2	6		0–4	—	–	4–1
3	(Faroe Islands) KÍ Klaksvík	3	0	1	2	3	10	−7	1		–	1–4	—	–
4	(North Macedonia) Skiponjat (H)	3	0	1	2	2	12	−10	1		–	–	1–1	—

Source: RSSSF
(H) Hosts

==== Group A6 ====
Pos	Team	Pld	W	D	L	GF	GA	GD	Pts	Qualification	SPR	UVI	CLU	GUN
1	(Czech Republic) Sparta Prague (H)	3	2	1	0	12	1	+11	7	Advance to second qualifying round	—	–	1–1	8–0
2	(Belarus) Universitet Vitebsk	3	1	1	1	4	5	−1	4		0–3	—	–	2–0
3	(Romania) Clujana Cluj-Napoca	3	0	3	0	5	5	0	3		–	2–2	—	–
4	(Lithuania) Gintra-Universitetas	3	0	1	2	2	12	−10	1		–	–	2–2	—

Source: RSSSF
(H) Hosts

==== Group A7 ====
Pos	Team	Pld	W	D	L	GF	GA	GD	Pts	Qualification	WRO	ARS	MHO	KOK
1	(Poland) AZS Wrocław (H)	3	3	0	0	17	0	+17	9	Advance to second qualifying round	—	5–0	–	11–0
2	(Ukraine) Arsenal Kharkiv	3	2	0	1	28	6	+22	6		–	—	8–1	–
3	(Israel) Maccabi Holon	3	1	0	2	7	9	−2	3		0–1	–	—	6–0
4	(Cyprus) AEK Kokkinochorion	3	0	0	3	0	37	−37	0		–	0–20	–	—

Source: RSSSF
(H) Hosts

==== Group A8 ====
Pos	Team	Pld	W	D	L	GF	GA	GD	Pts	Qualification	LTO	SAR	PVFA	KRK
1	(Russia) Lada Togliatti	3	3	0	0	14	0	+14	9	Advance to second qualifying round	—	3–0	6–0	–
2	(Bosnia and Herzegovina) SFK Sarajevo (H)	3	2	0	1	2	3	−1	6		–	—	–	1–0
3	(Slovakia) PVFA	3	1	0	2	4	8	−4	3		–	0–1	—	–
4	(Slovenia) KRKA Novo Mesto	3	0	0	3	1	10	−9	0		0–5	–	1–4	—

Source: RSSSF
(H) Hosts

==== Group A9 ====
Pos	Team	Pld	W	D	L	GF	GA	GD	Pts	Qualification	ALM	NSA	AEG	MTK
1	(Kazakhstan) Alma	3	2	0	1	10	3	+7	6	Advance to second qualifying round	—	5–0	2–3	–
2	(Bulgaria) NSA Sofia (H)	3	1	1	1	4	7	−3	4		–	—	–	1–1
3	(Greece) Aegina	3	1	1	1	6	7	−1	4		–	1–3	—	2–2
4	(Hungary) MTK	3	0	2	1	3	6	−3	2		0–3	–	–	—

Source: RSSSF
(H) Hosts

=== Second qualifying round ===
==== Group B1 ====
Pos	Team	Pld	W	D	L	GF	GA	GD	Pts	Qualification	TPO	MON	SAE	NEU
1	(Germany) Turbine Potsdam	3	2	1	0	14	1	+13	7	Advance to quarter-finals	—	0–0	2–0	–
2	(France) Montpellier (H)	3	2	1	0	6	1	+5	7	Advance to quarter-finals	–	—	–	4–0
3	(Netherlands) Saestum	3	1	0	2	5	7	−2	3		–	1–2	—	–
4	(Austria) Neulengbach	3	0	0	3	4	20	−16	0		1–12	–	3–4	—

Source: RSSSF
(H) Hosts

==== Group B2 ====
Pos	Team	Pld	W	D	L	GF	GA	GD	Pts	Qualification	DJU	VAL	ALM	MCN
1	(Sweden) Djurgården (H)	3	3	0	0	12	1	+11	9	Advance to quarter-finals	—	2–1	3–0	–
2	(Iceland) Valur	3	2	0	1	12	2	+10	6	Advance to quarter-finals	–	—	–	3–0
3	(Kazakhstan) Alma	3	1	0	2	5	14	−9	3		–	0–8	—	–
4	(Serbia and Montenegro) Masinac Classic Niš	3	0	0	3	3	15	−12	0		0–7	–	3–5	—

Source: RSSSF
(H) Hosts

==== Group B3 ====
Pos	Team	Pld	W	D	L	GF	GA	GD	Pts	Qualification	FRA	SPR	LUC	GBA
1	(Germany) Frankfurt	3	2	1	0	16	2	+14	7	Advance to quarter-finals	—	1–1	4–0	–
2	(Czech Republic) Sparta Prague	3	2	1	0	5	1	+4	7	Advance to quarter-finals	–	—	1–0	–
3	(Switzerland) LUwin.ch (H)	3	1	0	2	5	5	0	3		–	–	—	5–0
4	(Azerbaijan) Gömrükçü Baku	3	0	0	3	1	19	−18	0		1–11	0–3	–	—

Source: RSSSF
(H) Hosts

==== Group B4 ====
Pos	Team	Pld	W	D	L	GF	GA	GD	Pts	Qualification	BRØ	ARS	LTO	WRO
1	(Denmark) Brøndby (H)	3	3	0	0	6	1	+5	9	Advance to quarter-finals	—	1–0	2–0	–
2	(England) Arsenal	3	2	0	1	4	2	+2	6	Advance to quarter-finals	–	—	1–0	3–1
3	(Russia) Togliatti	3	0	1	2	3	6	−3	1		–	–	—	3–3
4	(Poland) AZS Wrocław	3	0	1	2	5	9	−4	1		1–3	–	–	—

Source: RSSSF
(H) Hosts

== Knockout phase ==
=== Bracket ===
Quarter-finals
(Iceland) Valur	1	1	2
(Germany) Turbine Potsdam	8	11	19
(Czech Republic) Sparta Prague	0	0	0
(Sweden) Djurgården	2	0	2
(England) Arsenal	1	1	2
(Germany) Frankfurt	1	3	4
(France) Montpellier	3	3	6
(Denmark) Brøndby	0	1	1

Semi-finals
(Germany) Turbine Potsdam	2	5	7
(Sweden) Djurgården	3	2	5
(Germany) Frankfurt (a)	0	3	3
(France) Montpellier	1	2	3

Final
(Germany) Turbine Potsdam	0	2	2
(Germany) Frankfurt	4	3	7

=== Quarter-finals ===
Team 1	Agg.	Team 2	1st leg	2nd leg
Valur (Iceland)	2–19	(Germany) Turbine Potsdam	1–8	1–11
Sparta Prague (Czech Republic)	0–2	(Sweden) Djurgården	0–2	0–0
Arsenal (England)	2–4	(Germany) Frankfurt	1–1	1–3
Montpellier (France)	6–1	(Denmark) Brøndby	3–0	3–1

=== Semi-finals ===
Team 1	Agg.	Team 2	1st leg	2nd leg
Turbine Potsdam (Germany)	7–5	(Sweden) Djurgården	2–3	5–2
Frankfurt (Germany)	3–3 (a)	(France) Montpellier	0–1	3–2

=== Final ===
Team 1	Agg.	Team 2	1st leg	2nd leg
Turbine Potsdam (Germany)	2–7	(Germany) Frankfurt	0–4	2–3

20 May 2006
16:00 (CET)

Turbine Potsdam (Germany)	0–4	(Germany) Frankfurt
	Report	Lingor 7', 84'; Albertz 64'; Garefrekes 77'

Karl-Liebknecht-Stadion, Potsdam
Attendance: 4,431
Referee: Eva Oedlund (Sweden)
27 May 2006
14:15 (CET)

Frankfurt (Germany)	3–2	(Germany) Turbine Potsdam
Jones 23'; Lingor 72' (pen.); Prinz 90+3'	Report	Pohlers 8', 35'

Bornheimer Hang, Frankfurt
Attendance: 13,200
Referee: Dagmar Damkova (Czech Republic)

UEFA Women's Cup
2005–06 winners

Second title

== Top goalscorers ==
(excluding qualifying rounds)

Rank	Player	Team	Goals
1	(Germany) Conny Pohlers	Turbine Potsdam	8
2	(Germany) Anja Mittag	Turbine Potsdam	6
3	(Germany) Renate Lingor	Frankfurt	5
