= FC Lada Togliatti (women) =

Lada Togliatti
- Full name: Football Club Lada Togliatti
- Founded: 1987
- Dissolved: 2009
- League: Russian Championship
- 2009: 7th
| Home colours | Away colours |

FC Lada Togliatti was a Russian women's football team.

Founded in 1987, Lada reached the Russian Women's Championship in 1994. For its eight first seasons in the top category, Lada ranked mainly between the 3rd and 6th spots, and reached the national Cup semifinals four times.

2002–2005 marked Lada's best period. 2004 was the team's best season as it won both the League and the Cup. In the other three years Lada was the league's runner-up. In its only appearance in the UEFA Women's Cup in 2005 Lada reached the second stage, where it was knocked out by Brøndby IF and Arsenal FC. That same year Lada won the Italy Women's Cup, an international tournament organized by the Italian LND, by beating Torres CF in the final. It also took part in the competition in 2004 and 2006, losing the final to Torres and Lehenda Chernihiv.

2006 marked the beginning of the end for Lada as the team was demoted to the third category. Lada was back in top-flight two years later, but retired from the competition three weeks before the end of the tournament and folded. Lada played its last match on 30 July 2009 against Energiya Voronezh.

== Honours ==
- 1 Russian League (2004)
- 1 Russian Cup (2004)
- 1 Italy Women's Cup (2005)

=== Record in UEFA Competitions ===
| Season | Competition | Stage | Result | Opponent |
|---|---|---|---|---|
| 2005–06 | UEFA Women's Cup | Qualifying Stage | 3–0 | (Bosnia and Herzegovina) SFK Sarajevo |
| 2005–06 | UEFA Women's Cup | Qualifying Stage | 6–0 | (Slovakia) PVFA Bratislava |
| 2005–06 | UEFA Women's Cup | Qualifying Stage | 5–0 | (Slovenia) Krka Novo Mesto |
| 2005–06 | UEFA Women's Cup | Group Stage | 0–2 | (Denmark) Brøndby IF |
| 2005–06 | UEFA Women's Cup | Group Stage | 0–1 | (England) Arsenal FC |
| 2005–06 | UEFA Women's Cup | Group Stage | 3–3 | (Poland) AZS Wroclaw |

== Former internationals ==
- (Russia) Natalia Barbashina
- (Russia) Elena Fomina
- (Russia) Natalia Russkikh
- (Russia) Valentina Savchenkova
- (Russia) Larisa Savina
- (Russia) Tatyana Skotnikova
- (Russia) Alexandra Svetlitskaya
- (Azerbaijan) Olga Vasilyeva
