= Sheila van den Bulk =

Dutch footballer (born 1989)

Personal information
- Full name: Michaela Wilhelmina Alida van den Bulk
- Date of birth: 6 April 1989 (age 37)
- Place of birth: Rotterdam, Netherlands
- Height: 1.67 m (5 ft 6 in)
- Position: Midfielder

Team information
- Current team: Eskilstuna United DFF
- Number: 19

Youth career
- 1995–2007: CVV Berkel

Senior career*
Years	Team	Apps	(Gls)
2008–2013	ADO Den Haag	85	(20)
2013	Sandviken	11	(0)
2014–2015	Kolbotn	41	(8)
2016–2021	Djurgården	93	(18)
2022–2024	Kristianstads DFF	40	(9)
2024	Vittsjö GIK	6	(0)
2024–2026	Eskilstuna United	61	(9)

International career
2004	Netherlands U15	2	(0)
2005	Netherlands U17	8	(0)
2005–2008	Netherlands U19	31	(3)
2016–2018	Netherlands	5	(0)
Medal record
Women's football
Representing the Netherlands
UEFA Women's Championship
Winner	2017 Netherlands
- * Club domestic league appearances and goals as of 20:12, 24 May 2024 (UTC)

Michaela Wilhelmina Alida "Sheila" van den Bulk (born 6 April 1989) is a Dutch football midfielder who currently plays for Eskilstuna United.

== Club career ==
=== Sandviken ===
Van den Bulk made her league debut against Stabæk on 4 August 2013.

=== Kolbotn ===
Van den Bulk made her league debut against Vålerenga on 21 April 2014. She scored her first league goal against Medkila on 27 April 2014, scoring in the 8th minute.

=== Djurgården ===
Van den Bulk made her league debut against Eskilstuna United on 17 April 2016. She scored her first league goal against Piteå on 1 September 2016, scoring a penalty in the 6th minute.

=== Kristianstads ===
Van den Bulk was announced at Kristianstads on 25 November 2021. She scored on her league debut against IFK Kalmar on 27 March 2022, scoring a penalty in the 27th minute.

=== Vittsjö ===
On 11 April 2024, it was announced that Van den Bulk had joined Vittsjö. She made her league debut against AIK Fotboll on 20 April 2024.

=== Eskilstuna ===
In August 2024, Eskilstuna United announced the signing of Van den Bulk.

== International career ==
On 4 June 2016, she made her debut for the Dutch national team, in a friendly match against South Africa.

She was part of the Dutch team which won the UEFA Women's Euro 2017. After the tournament, the whole team was honoured by the Prime Minister Mark Rutte and Minister of Sport Edith Schippers and made Knights of the Order of Orange-Nassau.

== Honours ==
Netherlands

- UEFA European Women's Championship: 2017
- Algarve Cup: 2018

Individual

- Knight of the Order of Orange-Nassau: 2017
