= Monika Matysová =

Slovak footballer (born 1981)

Personal information
- Date of birth: 29 December 1981 (age 44)
- Place of birth: Nitra, Czechoslovakia
- Height: 1.78 m (5 ft 10 in)
- Positions: Defender; midfielder

Senior career*
Years	Team	Apps	(Gls)
2001–2003	Rotox Nitra		
2004	Slavia Prague		
2005	Rotox Nitra		
2005–2010	Sparta Prague		
2010–2016	St. Pölten-Spratzern		
2016–2017	Sparta Prague	3	(0)
2017–2018	SV Horn		
2019–2020	Sparta Prague B		
2020–2022	Union Nové Zámky		

International career
2003–	Slovakia		
- * Club domestic league appearances and goals

Monika Matysová (born 29 December 1981) is a Slovak former footballer who played as a defender. She last played for Union Nové Zámky in the Slovak Women's First League.

She has served as captain of the Slovakia national team.
