= Tímea Gál =

Hungarian footballer

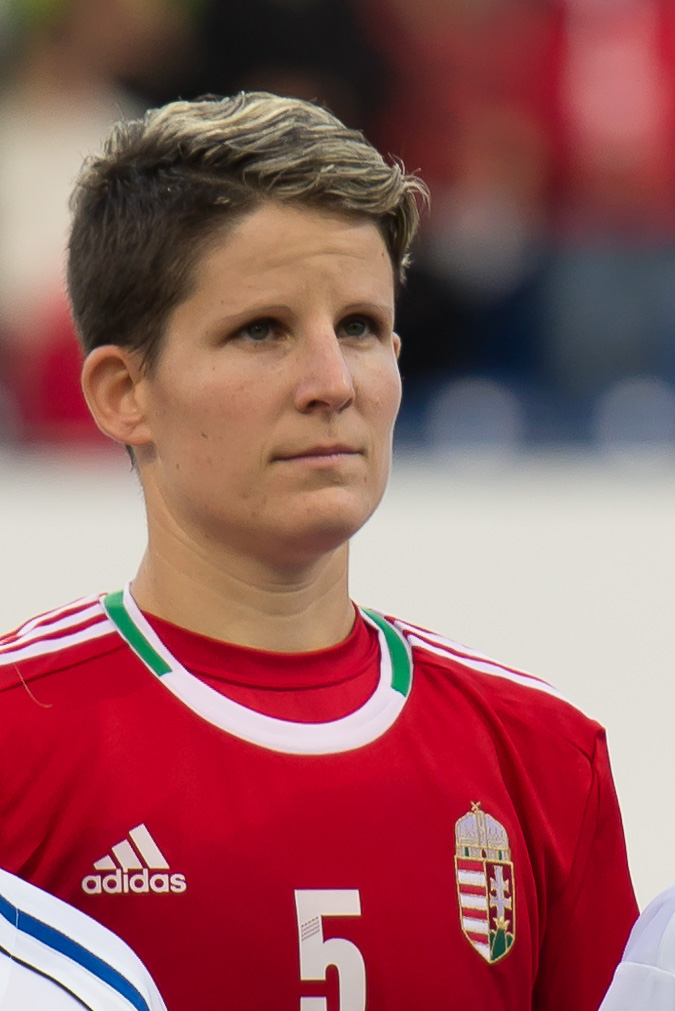
- Tímea Gál 2014

Personal information
- Full name: Tímea Gál
- Date of birth: 25 July 1984 (age 42)
- Place of birth: Budapest, Hungary
- Position: Defender

Senior career*
Years	Team	Apps	(Gls)
2001–2011	MTK Hungária FC		
2011–	Volos		

International career^{‡}
2004–2015	Hungary	68	(0)
- * Club domestic league appearances and goals ‡ National team caps and goals as of 11 March 2015

Tímea Gál is a Hungarian football defender currently playing for AS Volos in the Greek A Division. She previously played in the Hungarian First League for MTK Hungária FC, with whom she also played the Champions League, and she is a member of the Hungarian national team.
