= Katri Mattsson =

Finnish footballer (born 1982)

Personal information
- Full name: Katri Susanna Mattsson
- Birth name: Katri Susanna Nokso-Koivisto
- Date of birth: 22 November 1982 (age 43)
- Place of birth: Kauhajoki, Finland
- Height: 1.65 m (5 ft 5 in)
- Position: Midfielder

College career
Years	Team	Apps	(Gls)
2002–2003	Fresno State Bulldogs	39	(14)
2004–2005	Florida Atlantic Owls	37	(16)

Senior career*
Years	Team	Apps	(Gls)
1998–2001	United Pietarsaari		
2005–2006	United Pietarsaari		
2007–2008	Bälinge		
2009–2011	Wolfsburg	9	(0)
2012	Jitex	18	(1)
2013	LSK Kvinner FK	20	(0)
2014	PK-35 Vantaa	23	(3)
2015	FC Ilves	23	(3)

International career^{‡}
1999–2015	Finland	100	(2)
- * Club domestic league appearances and goals ‡ National team caps and goals as of 22:52, 21 January 2016 (UTC)

Katri Susanna Mattsson (née Nokso-Koivisto; born 22 November 1982) is a Finnish former football midfielder, who most recently played for PK-35 Vantaa. She is currently the vice-president of Football Association of Finland.

She previously played for LSK Kvinner FK of the Norwegian Toppserien. Before moving to Norway she played the 2012 season with Jitex BK in the Swedish Damallsvenskan. Mattsson previously played for United Pietarsaari in the Naisten Liiga, Florida Atlantic Owls in the NCAA, Bälinge IF in the Damallsvenskan, and VfL Wolfsburg in the Bundesliga.

A member of the Finnish national team since 1999, she played in the 2009 European Championship. In June 2013, Mattsson was named in national coach Andrée Jeglertz's Finland squad for UEFA Women's Euro 2013. In January 2016, Mattsson announced her retirement from football. She had recently collected her hundredth cap for the national team, but had been plagued by pain in her knees.
