= Málfríður Erna Sigurðardóttir =

Icelandic footballer

Personal information
- Date of birth: 30 May 1984 (age 42)
- Place of birth: Reykjavík, Iceland
- Position: Defender

Team information
- Current team: Valur
- Number: 44

Senior career*
Years	Team	Apps	(Gls)
2000–2014	Valur	157	(23)
2015–2016	Breiðablik	36	(3)
2017–	Valur	36	(3)

International career
2000–2001	Iceland U17	8	(0)
2000–2002	Iceland U19	13	(0)
2002–2006	Iceland U21	20	(0)
2003–	Iceland	33	(2)
- * Club domestic league appearances and goals

Málfríður Erna Sigurðardóttir (born 30 May 1984) is an Icelandic footballer who plays as a defender for Valur in the Úrvalsdeild kvenna, the top-tier women's football league in Iceland.

== Career ==
=== Club ===
Málfríður Erna started her professional career at Valur in the top-tier women's football league in Iceland. She played for Valur for 15 years before signing with Breiðablik in 2015, where she spent two seasons. In 2017, Málfríður Erna returned to Valur.

=== International ===
Málfríður Erna debuted for Iceland U17 on July 3, 2000, in a match against Germany. She participated in several youth competitions for Iceland U7, U20, and U21 teams. On February 13, 2003, she debuted for Iceland Senior Team in a match against the United States. Málfríður Erna represented Iceland in several important competitions at senior level, including the UEFA Women's Euro 2017.
