= FC United (Jakobstad) =

Finnish women's association football club

- Founded: 1993
- Ground: Västraplan, Jakobstad
- Capacity: 600
- Manager: Markus Kass
- League: Naisten Kolmonen
- 2018: Naisten Kolmonen, Group Keski-Pohjanmaa, 8th

FC United is a women's football club from Jakobstad, Finland, playing in the Finnish women's fourth tier Naisten Kolmonen. FC United was originally known as the women's section of FF Jaro and the current club was established in 1993.

== Club honours ==
- Finnish League: 2002, 2004
- Finnish Cup: 2001, 2004, 2005

== European record ==
Competition	Stage	Result	Opponent
2003-04 UEFA Women's Cup	Group stage	0–3	(Sweden) Malmö FF Dam
2003-04 UEFA Women's Cup	Group stage	0–2	(Ukraine) Lehenda-ShVSM
2003-04 UEFA Women's Cup	Group stage	3–1	(Israel) Maccabi Holon
2005-06 UEFA Women's Cup	Group stage	2–0	(Estonia) Pärnu JK
2005-06 UEFA Women's Cup	Group stage	1–2	(Iceland) Valur
2005-06 UEFA Women's Cup	Group stage	2–3	(Norway) Røa IL

== Former internationals ==
- (Finland) Emmi Alanen
- (Nigeria) Rita Chikwelu
- (Finland) Katri Nokso-Koivisto
- (Finland) Leena Puranen
- (Nigeria) Cynthia Uwak
- (Finland) Petra Vaelma
