= KŚ AZS Wrocław =

Polish football team

- Full name: Klub Środowiskowy Akademicki Związek Sportowy Wrocław
- Nickname(s): Czerwono-Białe (The Red and Whites)
- Founded: 1 July 1997; 28 years ago
- Dissolved: 13 May 2020; 5 years ago
- Ground: Boisko kompleksu hotelowo-rekreacyjnego GEM
- Capacity: 400
- Website: pnk.azs.wroclaw.pl
Home colours	Away colours

KŚ AZS Wrocław was a women's football team based in Wrocław, Poland. The football team was officially a part of the Wrocław University of Science and Technology's sporting section, called AZS-AWF Wrocław (founded in 1976). The ladies football club section of AZS-AWF Wrocław was founded in 1997 and quickly became a dominant force in women's football in Poland. During their 23 years as a club they won the Polish Championship eight times, with all eight titles being won consecutively from 2001–2008. They also finished second twice and finished third four times. As a club, they didn't finish outside of the top three between 2000–2011. AZS Wrocław have also had success in the Polish Cup, winning the competition four times.

On 13 May 2020, it was announced that AZS Wrocław had reached an agreement with Śląsk Wrocław for Śląsk's team to take AZS' place in the Ekstraliga.

== Club names ==
- Klub Środowiskowy Akademickiego Związku Sportowego Wrocław (1997–2006)
- Akademickiego Związku Sportowego Volksbank Leasing Wrocław (2006–2007)
- Klub Środowiskowy Akademickiego Związku Sportowego Wrocław (2007–2010)
- Klub Sportowy Akademicki Związek Sportowy Wrocław (2010–2020)

== Honours ==
Ekstraliga

- Winners (8): 2000–01, 2001–02, 2002–03, 2003–04, 2004–05, 2005–06, 2006–07, 2007–08
- Runners–up (2): 1999–2000, 2008–09
- Third place (4): 1997–98, 2009–10, 2010–11, 2013–14

Polish Cup

- Winners (4): 2002–03, 2003–04, 2006–07, 2008–09
- Runners–up (3): 2001–02, 2005–06, 2013–14

== Seasons ==
Season	League	Tier	Position	Matches	Points	W	D	L	GF	GA	Cup	Europe
2001–02	Ekstraliga	I	1 of 10	18	51	17	0	1	103	11	Runners-up	Group stage
2002–03	Ekstraliga	I	1 of 9	16	46	15	1	0	91	9	Winners	Group stage
2003–04	Ekstraliga	I	1 of 10	18	52	17	1	0	100	10	Winners	Group stage
2004–05	Ekstraliga	I	1 of 10	18	51	17	0	1	82	9	Quarter-final	Qualifying stage
2005–06	Ekstraliga	I	1 of 6	20	49	15	4	1	76	9	Runners-up	Group stage
2006–07	Ekstraliga	I	1 of 6	20	51	17	0	3	62	14	Winners	Qualifying stage
2007–08	Ekstraliga	I	1 of 6	20	50	16	2	2	55	8	Round of 16	
2008–09	Ekstraliga	I	2 of 6	20	45	13	6	1	68	12	Winners	Qualifying stage
2009–10	Ekstraliga	I	3 of 6	20	34	10	4	6	56	27	Semi-final	
2010–11	Ekstraliga	I	3 of 10	18	34	10	4	4	48	21	Semi-final	
2011–12	Ekstraliga	I	5 of 10	18	25	8	1	9	21	26	Semi-final	
2012–13	Ekstraliga	I	4 of 10	18	32	10	2	6	25	15	Round of 16	
2013–14	Ekstraliga	I	3 of 10	18	33	10	3	5	43	27	Runners-up	
2014–15	Ekstraliga	I	5 of 10	22	32	10	2	10	36	46	Quarter-final	
2015–16	Ekstraliga	I	4 of 12	27	44	13	5	9	50	36	Quarter-final	
2016–17	Ekstraliga	I	6 of 12	27	29	8	5	14	46	50	Round of 16	
2017–18	Ekstraliga	I	10 of 12	27	24	7	3	17	41	60	First round	
2018–19	Ekstraliga	I	10 of 12	27	19	5	4	18	24	86	First round	
2019–20	Ekstraliga	I	9 of 12	12	12	4	0	8	20	28	Round of 16	

=== UEFA competitions record ===
Season	Competition	Stage	Opponent	Result
2001–02	UEFA Women's Cup	Group stage	(Israel) Hapoel Tel Aviv	7–0
2001–02	UEFA Women's Cup	Group stage	(Switzerland) Bern	1–3
2001–02	UEFA Women's Cup	Group stage	(England) Arsenal	1–2
2002–03	UEFA Women's Cup	Group stage	(Finland) HJK Helsinki	0–2
2002–03	UEFA Women's Cup	Group stage	(Switzerland) Sursee	0–1
2002–03	UEFA Women's Cup	Group stage	(Wales) Bangor City	6–3
2003–04	UEFA Women's Cup	Group stage	(Norway) Kolbotn	2–15
2003–04	UEFA Women's Cup	Group stage	(France) Juvisy	0–3
2003–04	UEFA Women's Cup	Group stage	(Republic of Ireland) University College Dublin	3–0
2004–05	UEFA Women's Cup	Qualifying stage	(Wales) Cardiff City	2–1
2004–05	UEFA Women's Cup	Qualifying stage	(Faroe Islands) KÍ Klaksvík	5–1
2004–05	UEFA Women's Cup	Qualifying stage	(Ukraine) Metalist Kharkiv	2–0
2004–05	UEFA Women's Cup	Group stage	(Italy) Torres	0–5
2004–05	UEFA Women's Cup	Group stage	(Germany) Turbine Potsdam	1–4
2004–05	UEFA Women's Cup	Group stage	(France) Montpellier	2–0
2005–06	UEFA Women's Cup	Qualifying stage	(Ukraine) Arsenal Kharkiv	5–0
2005–06	UEFA Women's Cup	Qualifying stage	(Cyprus) AEK Kokkinochovion	11–0
2005–06	UEFA Women's Cup	Qualifying stage	(Israel) Maccabi Holon FC	1–0
2005–06	UEFA Women's Cup	Group stage	(England) Arsenal	1–3
2005–06	UEFA Women's Cup	Group stage	(Denmark) Brøndby	1–3
2005–06	UEFA Women's Cup	Group stage	(Russia) Lada Togliatti	3–3
2006–07	UEFA Women's Cup	Qualifying stage	(North Macedonia) Skiponjat	4–1
2006–07	UEFA Women's Cup	Qualifying stage	(Finland) HJK Helsinki	0–1
2006–07	UEFA Women's Cup	Qualifying stage	(Switzerland) Zuchwil	2–2
2008–09	UEFA Women's Cup	Qualifying stage	(Ukraine) Naftokhimik Kalush	0–1
2008–09	UEFA Women's Cup	Qualifying stage	(Estonia) Levadia Tallinn	4–0
2008–09	UEFA Women's Cup	Qualifying stage	(Greece) PAOK	4–0
