= Denaby United F.C. =

Association football club in England

Denaby United
- Full name: Denaby United Football Club
- Founded: 1895 (reformed 2011)
- Dissolved: 2002
- Ground: Tickhill Square
Home colours

Denaby United Football Club was a football club based in Denaby, Doncaster, South Yorkshire, England.

== History ==
The club was formed as Denaby Parish Church, and it was not long after the club was formed in 1895 that they gained a reputation as one of the biggest success stories in local football circles. Within five years of formation Denaby had already won the South Yorkshire League three times (having changed their name to Denaby United in 1898), in their debut FA Cup campaign in 1899 they reached the 3rd qualifying round, only losing to Hunslet after a second replay at Oakwell.

In 1902 Denaby left the Sheffield Association League, a competition they had been members of for just two years, to join the Midland League, at the time one of the most prestigious competitions outside the Football League. In 1906 they won the Sheffield and Hallamshire Senior Cup for the first time, but two years later the young Owls gained their revenge by pipping Denaby to the Midland League title. They won the Senior Cup for a second time in 1910 but resigned from the Midland League in 1913 to rejoin the Association League after falling on hard times and finishing bottom of the league for two years running. This came just a year after they had moved to their new home at Tickhill Square from their old one, the Recreation Ground, on Denaby Lane.

After the First World War, Denaby successfully applied to re-join the Midland League. In 1927 the club reached the first round of the FA Cup for the first time, setting a new ground attendance record of 5,200 for the game against Southport. They repeated the feat in 1932 when they lost 0–1 to Carlisle United at Brunton Park. Later that season they secured the Sheffield Senior Cup for a third time (they lost their first Senior Cup final in 1935 but won the cup again a year later by beating Worksop Town on their own ground).

Unlike their hiatus for the duration of the World War I, Denaby continued to play throughout World War II, competing again in the Sheffield Association League as the Midland League had been put on hold. They reached the league play-offs in 1944 but were beaten by Sheffield Wednesday reserves at Hillsborough.

When the war ended the club was re-admitted to the Midland League. Denaby reached the first round of the FA Cup again in 1958, losing 2–0 at home to Oldham Athletic in front of 3,807 spectators. The club was forced to play in the Central Alliance during the 1960–61 season when the Midland League disbanded, but re-joined when the issues surrounding the league's demise were settled. Their long stay in the Midland League would come to an end just four years later however, when they were voted out of the competition following two bottom placed finishes.

The club entered into the Yorkshire Football League for the 1965–66 season, joining Division Two. It took just two years for Denaby to achieve promotion to Division One, and in 1968 they just missed out on winning the league championship, finishing runners-up. They were relegated from the top flight in 1979, and by 1981 found themselves in the Third Division for the first time. In 1982 the Yorkshire League merged with the Midland League to form the Northern Counties East League (NCEL) and Denaby were placed in Division One South after finishing second in their final Yorkshire League Division Three campaign.

One of the last shots of Denaby United, during 1999–2000.

They won promotion to the NCEL Premier Division in 1984 and would remain there for the next 17 years, winning the league title in 1997 with the likes of Mel Sterland and Imre Varadi boosting the ranks.

In 2001 the club received a bombshell when the local miners welfare trust informed them they would not be allowed to play at Tickhill Square beyond the end of the 2001–02 season. Despite the pleas of members of the public and Caroline Flint MP, the decision was upheld and come May 2002, with no home ground, the club was dissolved. The club's last game was on 4 May 2002 against Arnold Town.

=== New club ===
In 2011 a second Denaby United was formed, playing in the Doncaster and District Senior League. This club, based at Old Road, Conisbrough, progressed through the local league ranks and for the 2015–16 season was participating in the Sheffield & Hallamshire County Senior League Division 1.

== Colours ==
The club's colours were traditionally red and white; as white shirts in the 1900s, stripes in the 1950s, and latterly as red shirts with white shorts. However its final kit was red and black striped shirts and black shorts.

== Season by season record ==
Season	Division	Level	Position	FA Cup	FA Trophy	FA Vase
Formed as Denaby Parish Church
1895–96	South Yorkshire League	–	12th/13	–	–	–
1896–97	South Yorkshire League	–	*	–	–	–
1897–98	South Yorkshire League	–	*	–	–	–
Changed name to Denaby United (1898)
1898–99	South Yorkshire League	–		–	–	–
1899–1900	South Yorkshire League	–		3rd qualifying round	–	–
1900–01	Sheffield Association League	-	8th/15	Preliminary round	–	–
1901–02	Sheffield Association League	–	2nd/13	3rd qualifying round	–	–
1902–03	Midland League	–	14th/17	–	–	–
1903–04	Midland League	-	14th/18	Preliminary round	–	–
1904–05	Midland League	–	10th/17	2nd qualifying round	–	–
1905–06	Midland League	–	7th/18	2nd qualifying round	–	–
1906–07	Midland League	–	5th/20	4th Qualifying Round	–	–
1907–08	Midland League	–	2nd/20	3rd qualifying round	–	–
1908–09	Midland League	–	5th/20	2nd qualifying round	–	–
1909–10	Midland League	–	13th/22	3rd qualifying round	–	–
1910–11	Midland League	–	17th/20	4th Qualifying Round	–	–
1911–12	Midland League	–	19th/19	2nd qualifying round	–	–
1912–13	Midland League	–	20th/20	Preliminary round	–	–
1913–14	Sheffield Association League	–		Extra preliminary round	–	–
1914–15	Sheffield Association League	–		–	–	–
1919–20	Sheffield Association League	–		Extra preliminary round	–	–
1920–21	Midland League	–	20th/20	1st Qualifying Round	–	–
1921–22	Midland League	–	14th/20	3rd qualifying round	–	–
1922–23	Midland League	–	4th/22	1st Qualifying Round	–	–
1923–24	Midland League	–	8th/22	4th Qualifying Round	–	–
1924–25	Midland League	–	9th/15	4th Qualifying Round	–	–
1925–26	Midland League	–	5th/21	1st Qualifying Round	–	–
1926–27	Midland League	–	9th/20	2nd qualifying round	–	–
1927–28	Midland League	–	14th/23	1st round	–	–
1928–29	Midland League	–	15th/26	4th Qualifying Round	–	–
1929–30	Midland League	–	22nd/26	Preliminary round	–	–
1930–31	Midland League	–	14th/24	1st Qualifying Round	–	–
1931–32	Midland League	–	21st/24	3rd qualifying round	–	–
1932–33	Midland League	–	11th/23	1st round	–	–
1933–34	Midland League	–	9th/17	3rd qualifying round	–	–
1934–35	Midland League	–	18th/20	Extra preliminary round	–	–
1935–36	Midland League	–	16th/21	4th Qualifying Round	–	–
1936–37	Midland League	–	20th/22	3rd qualifying round	–	–
1937–38	Midland League	–	22nd/20	2nd qualifying round	–	–
1938–39	Midland League	–	22nd/20	1st Qualifying Round	–	–
1945–46	Midland League	–	14th/19	3rd qualifying round	–	–
1946–47	Midland League	–	12th/22	2nd qualifying round	–	–
1947–48	Midland League	–	14th/22	2nd qualifying round	–	–
1948–49	Midland League	–	20th/22	2nd qualifying round	–	–
1949–50	Midland League	–	11th/24	1st Qualifying Round	–	–
1950–51	Midland League	–	17th/22	Preliminary round	–	–
1951–52	Midland League	–	21st/22	2nd qualifying round	–	–
1952–53	Midland League	–	23rd/24	3rd qualifying round	–	–
1953–54	Midland League	–	17th/24	1st Qualifying Round	–	–
1954–55	Midland League	–	21st/24	4th Qualifying Round	–	–
1955–56	Midland League	–	15th/24	4th Qualifying Round	–	–
1956–57	Midland League	–	16th/22	2nd qualifying round	–	–
1957–58	Midland League	–	23rd/24	3rd qualifying round	–	–
1958–59	Midland League	–	16th/19	1st round	–	–
1959–60	Midland League	–	16th/17	4th Qualifying Round	–	–
1960–61	Central Alliance Division 1 North	–	11th/18	2nd qualifying round	–	–
1961–62	Midland League	–	5th/18	1st Qualifying Round	–	–
1962–63	Midland League	–	13th/20	2nd qualifying round	–	–
1963–64	Midland League	–	22nd/22	1st Qualifying Round	–	–
1964–65	Midland League	–	22nd/22	–	–	–
1965–66	Yorkshire League Division 2	–	5th/15	2nd qualifying round	–	–
1966–67	Yorkshire League Division 2	–	2nd/17	2nd qualifying round	–	–
1967–68	Yorkshire League Division 1	–	2nd/17	2nd qualifying round	–	–
1968–69	Yorkshire League Division 1	–	8th/18	1st Qualifying Round	–	–
1969–70	Yorkshire League Division 1	–	7th/18	–	1st round	–
1970–71	Yorkshire League Division 1	–	7th/14	–	3rd qualifying round	–
1971–72	Yorkshire League Division 1	–	5th/16	2nd qualifying round	2nd round	–
1972–73	Yorkshire League Division 1	–	4th/16	1st Qualifying Round	1st round	–
1973–74	Yorkshire League Division 1	–	6th/16	2nd qualifying round	3rd qualifying round	–
1974–75	Yorkshire League Division 1	–	15th/16	1st Qualifying Round	Preliminary round	–
1975–76	Yorkshire League Division 2	–	4th/15	2nd qualifying round	Preliminary round	–
1976–77	Yorkshire League Division 1	–	12th/16	2nd qualifying round	–	3rd Round
1977–78	Yorkshire League Division 1	–	16th/16	1st Qualifying Round	–	2nd round
1978–79	Yorkshire League Division 2	–	9th/16	1st Qualifying Round	–	1st round
1979–80	Yorkshire League Division 2	–	14th/16	Preliminary round	–	Preliminary Round
1980–81	Yorkshire League Division 3	–	6th/16	Preliminary round	–	3rd Round
1981–82	Yorkshire League Division 3	–	2nd/15	1st Qualifying Round	–	Preliminary Round
1982–83	Northern Counties East League Division 1 South	–	5th/14	Preliminary round	–	1st round
1983–84	Northern Counties East League Division 1 South	–	2nd/14	Preliminary round	–	4th Round
1984–85	Northern Counties East League Premier Division	–	6th/19	3rd qualifying round	–	2nd round
1985–86	Northern Counties East League Premier Division	–	11th/20	1st Qualifying Round	1st Qualifying Round	–
1986–87	Northern Counties East League Premier Division	–	6th/19	Preliminary round	–	Preliminary Round
1987–88	Northern Counties East League Premier Division	–	3rd/17	1st Qualifying Round	–	Preliminary Round
1988–89	Northern Counties East League Premier Division	–	6th/17	Preliminary round	–	Preliminary Round
1989–90	Northern Counties East League Premier Division	–	3rd/18	1st Qualifying Round	–	3rd Round
1990–91	Northern Counties East League Premier Division	–	15th/16	1st Qualifying Round	–	1st round
1991–92	Northern Counties East League Premier Division	–	3rd/19	3rd qualifying round	–	Preliminary Round
1992–93	Northern Counties East League Premier Division	–	7th/20	Preliminary round	–	Preliminary Round
1993–94	Northern Counties East League Premier Division	–	13th/20	1st Qualifying Round	–	1st round
1994–95	Northern Counties East League Premier Division	–	14th/20	Preliminary round	–	Preliminary Round
1995–96	Northern Counties East League Premier Division	–	6th/20	2nd qualifying round	–	2nd qualifying round
1996–97	Northern Counties East League Premier Division	–	1st/20	Preliminary round	–	–
1997–98	Northern Counties East League Premier Division	–	12th/20	1st Qualifying Round	–	2nd round
1998–99	Northern Counties East League Premier Division	–	8th/20	1st Qualifying Round	–	3rd Round
1999–2000	Northern Counties East League Premier Division	–	13th/20	Preliminary round	–	2nd qualifying round
2000–01	Northern Counties East League Premier Division	–	11th/20	Preliminary round	–	1st Qualifying Round
2001–02	Northern Counties East League Premier Division	–	18th/20	Preliminary round	–	1st round
Season	Division	Level	Position	FA Cup	FA Trophy	FA Vase

* League play-off winners
** League playoff runners-up

== Notable former players ==
Players that have played in the Football League either before or after playing for Denaby United –

- Steve Adams
- Wally Ardron
- Reg Attwell
- Walter Aveyard
- Jack Barker
- Jamie Barnwell-Edinboro
- Chris Beaumont
- Walter Bennett
- John Bilton
- Arnold Birch
- John Bisby
- Eddie Boot
- Harold Buddery
- George Briggs
- Keith Burkinshaw
- Ralph Burkinshaw
- Sam Cowan
- Sam Cox
- Harry Draper
- Stewart Evans
- Joby Godfrey
- Albert Green
- Jimmy Harrop
- Leslie Hofton
- Harold Hughes
- Jimmy Hutchinson
- Howard Johnson
- David Kaye
- Chris Kelly
- Sam Kennedy
- Seth King
- John Lang
- Don Lees
- James Massey
- Wally McArthur
- Walter Millership
- Matt Moralee
- Harold Mosby
- Cliff Parker
- Edgar Powell
- Mick Prendergast
- Norman Rimmington
- Arthur Rodgers
- Bobby Saxton
- Aubrey Scriven
- Lionel Smith
- Mel Sterland
- Billy Taylor
- Ray Taylor
- Dennis Thompson
- Fred Thompson
- Tommy Tompkins
- John Westwood
- Ben Wheelhouse
- Billy Windle
- Tim Womack

== Grounds ==
Denaby's first home was a ground on Denaby Lane, but in 1912 they moved to a new home at Tickhill Square on Wadworth Street. They stayed there until dissolution in 2002.

== Honours ==
=== League ===
- Midland League
  - Runners-up: 1907–08
- Yorkshire League Division One
  - Runners-up: 1967–68
- Yorkshire League Division Two
  - Promoted: 1966–67
- Northern Counties East League Premier Division
  - Champions: 1996–97
- Northern Counties East League Division One South
  - Promoted: 1983–84
- Sheffield Association League
  - Runners-up: 1901–02
- South Yorkshire League
  - Champions: 1896–97, 1897–98, 1898–99

=== Cup ===
- Sheffield & Hallamshire Senior Cup
  - Winners: 1905–06, 1909–10, 1932–33, 1935–36, 1986–87
  - Runners-up: 1934–35, 1951–52, 1959–60, 1974–75, 1982–83, 1989–90

== Records ==
- Best FA Cup performance: 1st round, 1927–28, 1932–33, 1958–59
- Best FA Trophy performance: 2nd round, 1971–72
- Best FA Vase performance: 4th Round, 1983–84
- Record attendance: 5,200 vs. Southport, FA Cup, 1927–28
