= Samuel Cox =

Samuel or Sam Cox may refer to:

- Samuel Cox (minister) (1826–1893), English Baptist minister and Christian universalist
- Samuel Cox Jr. (1847–1906), American politician
- Samuel Hanson Cox (1793–1880), American Presbyterian minister and abolitionist
- Samuel S. Cox (1824–1889), American congressman and diplomat
- Samuel P. Cox (1828–1913), Union colonel in American Civil War; killed William T. Anderson
- Samuel D. Cox (born 1961), United States Air Force general
- Samuel Compton Cox (1757–1839), British barrister, judge and legal writer
- Sam Cox (actor), British television and stage actor
- Sam Cox (rugby union) (born 1980), English rugby union players
- Sam Cox (footballer, born 1990), English and Guyanese footballer
- Sam Cox (footballer, born 1920) (1920–1985), English footballer
- Sammy Cox (1924–2015), Scottish footballer
- Sam Cox (Australian politician) (born 1964), Liberal National Party of Queensland politician
- Sam Cox (born 1993 or 1994), British artist more commonly known as Mr Doodle

== See also ==
- Samuel Coxe, English MP
