= John Lang (footballer, born 1881) =

Scottish footballer

Personal information
- Date of birth: 16 August 1881
- Place of birth: Kilbirnie, Scotland
- Date of death: 1 September 1934 (aged 53)
- Place of death: Dinnington, England
- Height: 5 ft 6 1/2 in (1.69 m)
- Position: Outside right

Youth career
- Co-op United

Senior career*
Years	Team	Apps	(Gls)
- Govan
1902–1903	Barnsley		
1903–1909	Sheffield United	103	(13)
1909–1910	Leicester Fosse		
1910–1915	Denaby United		
1915	Dinnington Main		
- * Club domestic league appearances and goals

John Lang (16 August 1881 – 1 September 1934) was a Scottish footballer who played as an outside right. Born in Kilbirnie, in North Ayrshire, Scotland, he spent the majority of his career in England where he played for Barnsley, Sheffield United and Leicester Fosse in The Football League.

== Career ==
=== Club career ===
Lang had been playing for local Glasgow sides Co-op United and Govern when he was signed by Barnsley in August 1902. Making his Football League debut against Stockport County in September 1902, Lang stayed less than a season with the Yorkshire club, joining their local rivals Sheffield United for a £75 transfer fee in March 1903. Lang remained with United for just over five seasons but was injury prone and the 1904–05 season was the only one where he retained a regular place in the side. Despite this, he played over 100 games for the Blades before being sold to Leicester Fosse in September 1909. Leicester had paid £75 for Lang's services, but the cheque bounced and his move was delayed. Lang's stay at Leicester was only a brief one and he was released in the summer of 1910, returning to Yorkshire to work as a miner while playing non-league football for Denaby United.

=== International career ===
Lang had made a number of appearances for Scotland national junior teams by the time he signed for Barnsley in 1902. By 1905 Lang was near to a call up for Scotland, playing in an Anglo–Scots Vs Home-Scots fixture in March of that year, but his injury problems meant that he failed to break into the national team.
