= Sam Kennedy (footballer, born 1896) =

English professional footballer

Personal information
- Full name: Samuel Kennedy
- Date of birth: 1896
- Place of birth: Platts Common, Hoyland, England
- Date of death: 9 December 1963 (aged 66–67)
- Place of death: Scunthorpe, England
- Height: 5 ft 11 3/4 in (1.82 m)
- Positions: Centre forward; wing half

Senior career*
Years	Team	Apps	(Gls)
19??–1920	Wombwell		
1920–1921	Huddersfield Town	0	(0)
1921	Burnley	0	(0)
1921–1922	Denaby United		
1922–1924	Wombwell		
1924	Nelson	6	(0)
1924–1926	Fulham	6	(1)
1926–1927	Barnsley	9	(5)
1927–1928	Mexborough Athletic		
1928–1929	Shirebrook		
1929–1930	Scunthorpe & Lindsey United		
1930–1931	Brigg Town		
1931–19??	Broughton Rangers		
- * Club domestic league appearances and goals

Sam Kennedy (1896 – 9 December 1963) was an English professional footballer who played for five different Football League clubs. He started his career as a right-half, but later played in the centre forward position.

== Biography ==
Samuel Kennedy was born in the small village of Platts Common near Hoyland, West Riding of Yorkshire, in 1896. Apart from football, he was also a keen sprinter. After retiring from football, he lived in Scunthorpe, where he worked in a hotel. After the Second World War, Kennedy became a director of Scunthorpe United. He remained in the town for the rest of his life and died there on 9 December 1963.

== Career ==
Kennedy started his footballing career in local-league football with Wombwell. In August 1920, he was signed by Football League First Division side Huddersfield Town. He failed to make a first-team appearance for the club. The following summer, Kennedy joined Football League champions Burnley. However, he was again unable to break into the senior team, and was only used in the reserve side. He subsequently returned to non-League football with Denaby United in December 1921 before re-joining Wombwell for the start of the 1922–23 season.

In February 1924, Kennedy moved to Football League Second Division club Nelson for a transfer fee of £200. He made his Nelson debut in the 0–2 defeat to South Shields on 2 February, and was also selected for the next two matches where the team lost to South Shields and Bury. After more than a month out of the side, Kennedy was selected for the trip to Bradford City on 29 March. He made his sixth and final league appearance for Nelson in the 1–3 home defeat to Port Vale on 12 April 1924. The team was relegated to the Third Division North at the end of the season, but Kennedy remained at Nelson despite the departures of several other players.

Kennedy returned to the Second Division in October 1924, when he was signed by London-based team Fulham. During a two-year association with Fulham he played six league matches for the Cottagers, scoring one goal. In October 1926, Kennedy transferred to Barnsley, thus returning to Yorkshire. He scored five goals in nine league appearances for the club in the most prolific period of his professional career. Upon his departure from Barnsley in March 1927, he joined Mexborough Town and went on to play non-League football for several seasons, representing clubs as Shirebrook, Scunthorpe & Lindsey United, Brigg Town and Broughton Rangers.
