= Dennis Thompson (footballer) =

English footballer

Personal information
- Full name: Dennis Thompson
- Date of birth: 2 June 1925
- Place of birth: Sheffield, England
- Date of death: 10 June 1986 (aged 61)
- Place of death: Bournemouth, England
- Height: 5 ft 6 1/2 in (1.69 m)
- Position: Forward

Youth career
- 1939–1942: Sheffield United
- Woodbourne Alliance
- Fulwood

Senior career*
Years	Team	Apps	(Gls)
1942–1951	Sheffield United	96	(20)
1942	→ Rotherham United (guest)		
1943–1944	→ Lincoln City (guest)		
1945	→ Crystal Palace (guest)		
1951–1954	Southend United	51	(0)
1954–1957	Clacton Town		
1957–1958	Matlock Town		
- Denaby United
- * Club domestic league appearances and goals

Dennis Thompson (2 June 1925 – 10 June 1986) was an English footballer who played as a forward.

Born in Sheffield, Thompson was already an England schoolboy international when he joined Sheffield United on amateur terms in March 1939. Employed as a member of the ground staff, Thompson was sent to play for two of United's feeder clubs, Woodbourne Alliance and Fulwood. With league football suspended during World War II, Thompson became a regular player for the club's reserve team before making his first-team debut in 1941 (playing in the unofficial wartime league), becoming the club's youngest ever player to that point, being only 16 years and 103 days old.

Thompson enlisted not long after making his debut and served with the Durham Light Infantry, but continued to make occasional appearances for United when not on active duty, as well as making guest appearances for Rotherham United, Lincoln City and Crystal Palace. Wounded while on active duty in Germany in 1945, Thompson remained in the army after the end of the conflict, but was allowed to resume his career with Sheffield United on a part-time basis, and made his Football League debut during the 1946–47 season.

Having been demobbed in 1947, Thompson finally became a full-time professional and played regularly for United for the next few seasons. Considered to have a good amount of pace and skill, Thompson was not popular with sections of the united support who believed he lacked commitment and aggression and he was regularly barracked during games which led to Thompson asking for a transfer in 1949. No move was forthcoming and Thompson continued to play for United but his appearances began to be less frequent and he was eventually sold to Southend United for £1,500 in July 1951.

Thompson made 51 league appearances for Southend before moving into non-league football, joining Clacton Town in 1954, followed by Matlock Town and finally Denaby United before retiring.
