= Albert Green (footballer, born 1907) =

English footballer

Personal information
- Full name: Albert Green
- Date of birth: 18 April 1907
- Place of birth: Hanley, Staffordshire, England
- Date of death: q1 1977 (aged 69)
- Position: Inside left

Senior career*
Years	Team	Apps	(Gls)
–	Denaby Rovers		
–	Denaby United		
1927–192?	Sheffield Wednesday	0	(0)
–	Denaby United		
–	Gainsborough Trinity		
1934–193?	West Ham United	0	(0)
1935–1936	Lincoln City	23	(6)
–	Newark Town		
–	Gainsborough Trinity		
- * Club domestic league appearances and goals

Albert Green (18 April 1907 – q1 1977) was an English footballer who made 23 appearances in the Football League playing for Lincoln City as an inside left. He was on the books of Sheffield Wednesday and West Ham United without representing either club in the league, and also played non-league football for Denaby Rovers, Denaby United, Gainsborough Trinity and Newark Town.
