= Arthur Rodgers (footballer) =

English footballer (1907–1987)

Personal information
- Date of birth: 8 February 1907
- Place of birth: Frickley, England
- Date of death: 1987 (aged 79–80)
- Height: 5 ft 10 in (1.78 m)
- Position: Left back

Senior career*
Years	Team	Apps	(Gls)
- Frickley Colliery
−1928	Denaby United		
1928–1932	Hull City	67	(?)
1932–1933	Merthyr Town		
1933–1939	Doncaster Rovers	176	(1)
- * Club domestic league appearances and goals

Arthur Rodgers (8 February 1907 – 1987) was an English footballer who played as a left back in the Football League for Hull City and Doncaster Rovers.

== Playing career ==
Rodgers started off with local club Frickley Colliery and then Denaby United.

=== Hull City ===
He signed for Hull City in 1928, making 67 League appearances before being released at the end of the 1931–32 season.

=== Doncaster Rovers ===
Doncaster signed him from Welsh club, Merthyr Town of the Southern League for the 1933–34 season. He made his first appearance the following season in a 2–0 home win against Southport on 4 September 1934. His only goal for the club was the significant winner in a 2–1 victory at Wrexham on 27 April 1935, which clinched the Division 3 (North) title, winning promotion for Doncaster to Division 2.

Rodgers was a regular feature in the side, with a few periods of competition with other full-backs. He played every league and FA Cup game in 1937–38. At the start of the following season, Albert Walker, a left−back, arrived from West Ham as part of an exchange for Arthur Banner, and replaced Rodgers a few games into the season. He then went on to make a few appearances as right-back, his last game being against Halifax Town on 18 October. Rodgers retired at the end of the season after a total of 183 league and cup games, and that one goal.

== Honours ==
Doncaster Rovers

- Third Division North

Champions 1934–35
