= Billy Taylor (footballer, born 1896) =

English footballer and cricketer

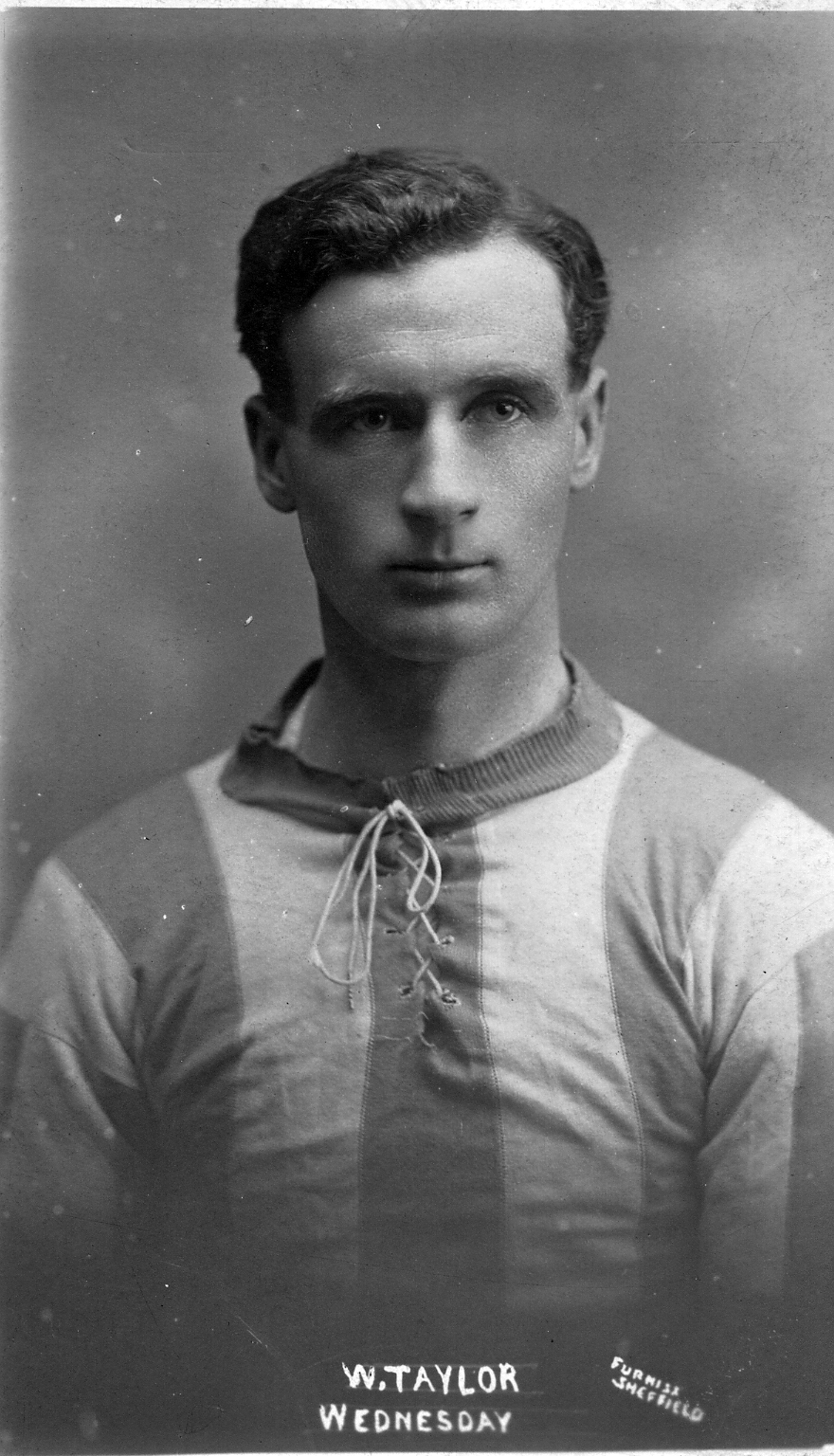
- Taylor in Sheffield Wednesday strip.

Personal information
- Full name: William Taylor
- Date of birth: 1896
- Place of birth: Crook, England
- Date of death: 1986 (aged 89–90)
- Height: 5 ft 9 1/2 in (1.77 m)
- Position: Inside left

Senior career*
Years	Team	Apps	(Gls)
- Durham City
- Crook Town
- Norwich City
1919–1922	Sheffield Wednesday		
1922–1923	Doncaster Rovers	37	(11)
1923–1925	Mansfield Town		
1925–1926	Doncaster Rovers	19	(5)
1926–????	Denaby United		
- * Club domestic league appearances and goals

William Taylor (1896–1986) was an English football and cricket player.

== Football career ==
He played for Durham City, Crook Town and Norwich City before playing First Division football for Sheffield Wednesday from 1919 to 1922.

He moved to Doncaster Rovers in the Midland League for the 1922–23 season, scoring 11 goals in his 37 appearances as Doncaster ended the season as league runners up. He was also part of the Wharncliffe Charity Cup winning side who beat Scunthorpe & Lindsey United 1–0 on 24 April 1923.

Doncaster were then elected to the Third Division North and Taylor went to play for Midland League side Mansfield Town for two seasons, winning the Midland League on both occasions.

He rejoined Doncaster in 1925 for one season, scoring 5 goals in 19 appearances, after which he played for Midland League team Denaby United.

== Cricket career ==
He also played cricket for teams in the North of England. He was a good all-rounder and an excellent batsman. He played latterly for some 15 years in the Doncaster Works Athletic Club first team.

== Personal life ==
During the First World War he served with the Durham Light Infantry and became a commissioned officer. He was decorated for bravery in carrying out a successful daylight patrol into the German trenches at the Battle of Arras on the Somme and for digging out men in his section under heavy shellfire. During the Second World War Major Taylor commanded the 1000 strong Doncaster Works Home Guard.

In 1920 he married Jean, the daughter of Dr. Robert Steel of Crook, Co. Durham, and they had two sons. During his time playing football in Doncaster he joined the staff of the LNER (later British Rail) at the Doncaster Railway Engineering Works where he spent most of his working career.

== Honours ==
Doncaster Rovers

- Midland League Runners up 1922–23
- Wharncliffe Charity Cup Winners 1922–23

Mansfield Town

- Midland League Champions 1923–24, 1924–25
