= Steve Adams (footballer, born 1959) =

English footballer (1959–2017)

Personal information
- Full name: Stephen Adams
- Date of birth: 7 September 1959
- Place of birth: Sheffield, England
- Date of death: 3 March 2017 (aged 57)
- Place of death: Sheffield, England
- Position: Forward

Senior career*
Years	Team	Apps	(Gls)
1984–1987	Worksop Town	32	(?)
1987–1989	Scarborough	48	(5)
1989–1991	Doncaster Rovers	35	(2)
1991–1992	Boston United	51	(3)
1992	Kettering Town	10	(0)
1992–1993	Witton Albion	24	(0)
1993	Gateshead	2	(0)
1993–1994	Macclesfield Town	28	(1)
1994–1995	Boston United	35	(1)
1995–1996	Denaby United	?	(?)
1996–1997	Matlock Town	?	(?)
- * Club domestic league appearances and goals

Stephen Adams (7 September 1959 – 3 March 2017) was an English professional footballer who played as a forward in the Football League for Scarborough and Doncaster Rovers.

Adams played non-league football before going into coaching.
