= John Bisby =

English footballer

Personal information
- Full name: John Charles Bisby
- Date of birth: 4 December 1876
- Place of birth: Rawmarsh, England
- Date of death: 1945 (aged 68–69)
- Position: Wing half

Senior career*
Years	Team	Apps	(Gls)
1903–1904	Kilnhurst Town		
1904–1905	Highthorne		
1905–1906	Sheffield United	1	(0)
1906–1908	Grimsby Town	7	(1)
1908–19??	Denaby United		
- * Club domestic league appearances and goals

John Charles Bisby (4 December 1876 – 1945) was an English professional footballer who played as a wing half.
