= South Yorkshire Football League =

- Founded: 1892
- Folded: 1923
- Country: England

The South Yorkshire League was a football competition for clubs in the Dearne Valley area of South Yorkshire, England.

== Honours ==
=== League champions ===
Season	
1892–93	Mexborough Olympic
1893–94	Kimberworth
1894–95	Conisbrough Town
1895–96	Wombwell Rising Star
1896–97	Denaby Parish Church
1897–98	Denaby Parish Church
1898–99	Denaby United
1899–1900	
1900–01	Doncaster Rovers reserves
1901–02	
1902–03	
1903–04	Highthorne
1904–05	Swinton Strollers
1905–06	South Kirkby Colliery reserves
1906–07	South Kirkby Colliery reserves
1907–08	South Kirkby Colliery reserves
1908–09	Rawmarsh Albion
1909–10	Conisbrough Swifts and South Kirkby Colliery reserves (shared)
1910–11	Bentley Colliery
1911–12	Doncaster St. James
1912–13	Brodsworth Main Colliery reserves
1913–14	Bullcroft Main Colliery
1914–15	
1915–16	
1916–17	
1917–18	
1918–19	
1919–20	
1920–21	
1921–22	Barnburgh Main
1922–23	
