= Tim Womack =

English footballer

Personal information
- Full name: Albert R. Womack
- Date of birth: 20 September 1934
- Place of birth: Denaby, England
- Date of death: 8 November 2010 (aged 76)
- Place of death: Barnby Dun, England
- Position: Outside left

Senior career*
Years	Team	Apps	(Gls)
- Denaby United
1957–1959	Derby County	2	(0)
1959–1960	Southampton	0	(0)
1960–1961	Workington	9	(1)
- * Club domestic league appearances and goals

Albert R. "Tim" Womack (20 September 1934 – 8 November 2010) was an English professional footballer who played at outside left for various clubs in the 1950s and 1960s.

== Football career ==
Womack was born in Denaby, near Doncaster and played his early football with Denaby United before turning professional with Derby County in October 1957. He spent two years with the Baseball Ground club, but only made two appearances in the Football League Second Division.

In May 1959, he moved to the south coast to join Southampton of the Third Division. With John Sydenham established in the outside-left position, Womack was unable to break into the first team and spent his year at The Dell in the reserves, where he made 20 appearances, scoring three goals. The "Saints" ended the season as champions, but shortly afterwards Womack was released.

He then joined Workington of the Fourth Division for a season, making nine league appearances.

== Death ==
Womack died on 8 November 2010 at his home in Barnby Dun, near Doncaster, aged 76 years. He was married to Doreen and they had three children.
