= Norman Rimmington =

English footballer

Personal information
- Full name: Norman Rimmington
- Date of birth: 29 November 1923
- Place of birth: Staincross, England
- Date of death: 29 December 2016 (aged 93)
- Position: Goalkeeper

Senior career*
Years	Team	Apps	(Gls)
–1945	Mapplewell Town		
1945–1947	Barnsley	27	(0)
1947–1952	Hartlepools United	124	(0)
Total		151	(0)
- * Club domestic league appearances and goals

Norman Rimmington BEM (29 November 1923 – 29 December 2016) was an English footballer who played in the Football League for Barnsley and Hartlepools United.

== Early career ==
Rimmington was born in Staincross and began work at North Gawber pit as a 'fitter' after leaving school at 14 whilst playing amateur football with Mapplewell Town. A competent cricket and tennis player, he joined Barnsley in February 1945 on 'amateur terms' but signed professionally for the Tykes upon the resumption of league football (following WW2's conclusion) in 1946.

After a short loan spell with Buxton FC in the Cheshire league, his professional debut came on Saturday 7th September 1946 in the Second Division against Coventry City at Highfield Road, having previously made his debut in the wartime league against Leeds United in May of the same year.

He spent one season with Barnsley before joining Hartlepools United. He spent five years at Hartlepools making 124 league appearances before signing for Wisbech Town in the Midland League in November 1951.

Norman returned to Buxton FC in April 1953 and then spent the 1953/54 season with the 'Bucks' before returning to Yorkshire to play for Denaby United.

== Coaching career ==
After ending his playing career following a broken finger, Barnsley manager Tim Ward handed Rimmington a coaching role at the club, where he oversaw the club's 'A' team. After overseseing the club's Central League team in the latter part of the 1961/62 season, Norman was then appointed as 'head trainer' under manager and his former team-mate Johnny Steele in the summer of 1962 on a full-time basis. Norman attended Lilleshall to attain his coaching qualifications and 'treatment of injuries' certificate. Norman became a fully qualified coach in the summer of 1965.

Norman would sometimes oversee first-team affairs on a matchday, as manager Johnny Steele would head off to other matches scouting. Johnny Steele also suffered with his health and Norman was left in charge of the team for a few weeks in November 1966 whilst Johnny was hospitalised.

== Groundsman ==
In 1973, Norman was appointed head groundsman as he had become disillusioned with the club's financial struggles and its negative impact on the team that were struggling in Division Four.

Norman saw this as a natural transition, as he had worked with machinery all of his life as a trained mechanical engineer.

== Physio/Assistant Manager ==
In the summer of 1978, Allan Clarke was appointed Player-Manager at Barnsley and he immediately reinstated Norman as Physio and his 'right-hand man'. Norman was instrumental to Allan as the club rebuilt from Division Four.

In 1988, he retired from his role as physio and worked as head groundsman, before becoming kit man at Oakwell.

== Kitman ==
Norman was appointed as Kitman whilst Viv Anderson was Player-Manager, a role Norman continued in when Danny Wilson took over as manager and guided the club to the Premier League in 1997.

Norman continued working as Kitman for home games but gave up travelling away when Dave Bassett arrived as manager in 1999, citing that killing time around hotels was 'deadly'.

== Post 2000s ==
Norman continued working in the club's laundry room in the early 2000s.

Rimmington was still working at Oakwell in the laundry room past his 90th birthday.

In May 2012, Norman was invited to Buckingham Palace for the Queen's Garden Party.

On 29 December 2016, Rimmington died at the age of 93..

== Legacy ==
On 30 December 2016, Barnsley announced that Rimmington was aware that he was to be awarded a British Empire Medal for services to the local community and football in the 2017 New Year Honours List. His family will receive the medal on his behalf.

In the summer of 2022, Barnsley Football Club hosted a vote to rename its south stand with Norman Rimmington emerging as their preferred choice.

A book about his life was commissioned and set to be published in November 2026.

== Honours ==
- *2007 'Spirit of Barnsley Award'
- *2011 Football League Awards 'Highly Commended' Unsung Hero
- * League Managers Association (LMA) Services to Football Award 2014
- Barnsley Hall of Fame
- Proud of Barnsley Award, 2015
- British Empire Medal 2017
