= 1977–78 FA Cup qualifying rounds =

Tournament details
- Country: England; Wales

The FA Cup 1977–78 is the 97th season of the world's oldest football knockout competition; The Football Association Challenge Cup, or FA Cup for short. The large number of clubs entering the tournament from lower down the English football league system meant that the competition started with a number of preliminary and qualifying rounds. The 28 victorious teams from the fourth round qualifying progressed to the first round proper.

== Preliminary round ==
=== Ties ===
Tie	Home team	Score	Away team
1	Cheltenham Town	4–1	Moor Green
2	Clapton	4–1	Metropolitan Police
3	Clevedon Town	4–0	Mangotsfield United
4	Didcot Town	2–2	Leytonstone
5	Eppleton Colliery Welfare	1–0	South Bank
6	Glastonbury	0–1	Merthyr Tydfil
7	Gravesend & Northfleet	4–0	Staines Town
8	Halesowen Town	2–1	Oldbury United
9	Harwich & Parkeston	4–0	Southall & Ealing Borough
10	Hatfield Town	1–2	Marlow
11	Heanor Town	2–2	Leek Town
12	Hillingdon Borough	3–3	Slough Town
13	Horden Colliery Welfare	2–2	Spennymoor United
14	Hounslow	2–1	Molesey
15	Ilford	1–0	Woking
16	Ilkeston Town	0–0	Tamworth
17	Kempston Rovers	2–1	Potton United
18	Kidderminster Harriers	5–2	Sutton Coldfield Town
19	Kingstonian	0–1	Tilbury
20	Leyton Wingate	2–0	Uxbridge
21	Littlehampton Town	0–1	Three Bridges
22	Melksham Town	1–0	Welton Rovers
23	Milton Keynes City	0–2	Rushden Town
24	North Shields	1–1	West Auckland Town
25	Romford	1–1	Walthamstow Avenue
26	Ruislip Manor	1–3	Windsor & Eton
27	Runcorn	4–0	Bacup Borough
28	Sheppey United	1–2	Bexhill Town
29	Skelmersdale United	0–3	Accrington Stanley
30	Southwick	0–1	Waterlooville
31	Spalding United	2–3	Arnold
32	Stourbridge	1–1	Tividale
33	Sudbury Town	1–1	Bury Town
34	Sutton Town	2–1	Belper Town
35	Taunton Town	1–2	Bath City
36	Trowbridge Town	1–1	Weston Super Mare
37	Tunbridge Wells	5–0	Canterbury City
38	V S Rugby	0–0	Bedworth United
39	Wadebridge Town	0–7	Barnstaple Town
40	Wallsend Town	2–3	Whitby Town
41	Whitstable Town	0–1	Ashford Town (Kent)
42	Wigmore Athletic	1–3	East Grinstead
43	Willesden	4–3	Bedford Town
44	Wingate (Durham)	2–1	Annfield Plain
45	Winsford United	1–1	Ashton United
46	Winterton Rangers	0–1	Appleby Frodingham
47	Wisbech Town	5–0	Clacton Town
48	Witton Albion	1–1	Bangor City
49	Wolverton Town & B R	1–1	Banbury United
50	Yeovil Town	2–2	Alton Town
51	Yorkshire Amateur	0–2	Barton Town

=== Replays ===
Tie	Home team	Score	Away team
4	Leytonstone	1–0	Didcot Town
11	Leek Town	2–0	Heanor Town
12	Slough Town	0–1	Hillingdon Borough
13	Spennymoor United	3–1	Horden Colliery Welfare
16	Tamworth	1–0	Ilkeston Town
24	West Auckland Town	2–1	North Shields
25	Walthamstow Avenue	3–2	Romford
32	Tividale	1–0	Stourbridge
33	Bury Town	2–0	Sudbury Town
36	Weston Super Mare	2–1	Trowbridge Town
38	Bedworth United	0–1	V S Rugby
45	Ashton United	0–2	Winsford United
48	Bangor City	2–0	Witton Albion
49	Banbury United	4–1	Wolverton Town & B R
50	Alton Town	0–4	Yeovil Town

== 1st qualifying round ==
=== Ties ===
Tie	Home team	Score	Away team
1	A P Leamington	3–1	Tividale
2	Addlestone	0–1	Clapton
3	Alfreton Town	0–1	Leek Town
4	Alvechurch	2–2	Kidderminster Harriers
5	Andover	2–0	Three Bridges
6	Atherstone Town	0–0	Cheltenham Town
7	Aveley	0–2	Leytonstone
8	Aylesbury United	0–3	Kempston Rovers
9	Barking	5–2	Chalfont St Peter
10	Barnet	4–1	Camberley Town
11	Barry Town	4–1	Melksham Town
12	Barton Rovers	1–1	Hemel Hempstead
13	Basingstoke Town	2–0	Marlow
14	Berkhamsted Town	0–5	Gravesend & Northfleet
15	Billericay Town	1–1	Harwich & Parkeston
16	Billingham Synthonia	2–0	Eppleton Colliery Welfare
17	Bilston	1–2	Brierley Hill Alliance
18	Bishop Auckland	3–0	West Auckland Town
19	Bognor Regis Town	0–2	Farnborough Town
20	Boldon Community Association	3–1	Carlisle City
21	Bracknell Town	1–2	Tilbury
22	Bridgend Town	4–3	Clevedon Town
23	Bridlington Town	1–1	Durham City
24	Bridlington Trinity	1–2	Appleby Frodingham
25	Bridport	0–3	Bath City
26	Brigg Town	2–0	Farsley Celtic
27	Burgess Hill Town	2–1	Bexhill Town
28	Burnham	0–1	Chertsey Town
29	Burscough	2–2	Accrington Stanley
30	Burton Albion	1–0	Stratford Town
31	Calne Town	3–1	Chippenham Town
32	Cambridge City	1–1	Bury Town
33	Carshalton Athletic	2–3	St Albans City
34	Chard Town	1–0	Barnstaple Town
35	Chatteris Town	1–6	Arnold
36	Chesham United	5–0	Willesden
37	Cheshunt	3–2	Walton & Hersham
38	Chorley	5–1	Clitheroe
39	Consett	1–1	Wingate (Durham)
40	Corby Town	1–1	V S Rugby
41	Corinthian Casuals	5–1	Epping Town
42	Coventry Sporting	1–1	Enderby Town
43	Crawley Town	3–1	Deal Town
44	Crook Town	3–0	Evenwood Town
45	Croydon	3–3	Tunbridge Wells
46	Darlaston	3–0	Eastwood Town
47	Dorchester Town	0–0	Fareham Town
48	Dover	0–1	Maidstone United
49	Droylsden	0–2	Runcorn
50	Dudley Town	1–1	Gloucester City
51	Dulwich Hamlet	1–0	Egham Town
52	Easington Colliery Welfare	4–4	Whitley Bay
53	Eastbourne United	4–0	East Grinstead
54	Edgware Town	4–1	Dunstable
55	Ely City	1–2	Holbeach United
56	Emley	3–2	Barton Town
57	Enfield	6–0	Wembley
58	Epsom & Ewell	1–1	Feltham
59	Erith & Belvedere	4–2	Hounslow
60	Evesham United	0–0	Merthyr Tydfil
61	Falmouth Town	0–1	Newquay
62	Faversham Town	0–3	Folkestone & Shepway
63	Felixstowe Town	2–4	Gorleston
64	Ferryhill Athletic	2–4	Spennymoor United
65	Finchley	1–0	Vauxhall Motors
66	Forest Green Rovers	3–2	Larkhall Athletic
67	Formby	1–0	Lancaster City
68	Friar Lane Old Boys	1–2	Telford United
69	Frickley Athletic	3–1	North Ferriby United
70	Frome Town	2–1	Yeovil Town
71	Gainsborough Trinity	1–0	Ashby Institute
72	Glossop	0–2	Winsford United
73	Goole Town	6–1	Louth United
74	Gornal Athletic	1–3	Halesowen Town
75	Gosport Borough	0–0	Hungerford Town
76	Grays Athletic	1–1	Hillingdon Borough
77	Great Harwood	1–1	Prestwich Heys
78	Gresley Rovers	2–2	Sutton Town
79	Hampton	3–0	Wokingham Town
80	Haringey Borough	2–2	Ware
81	Harlow Town	5–0	Stowmarket
82	Harrow Borough	1–1	Witney Town
83	Hastings United	2–2	Margate
84	Hayes	0–2	Ilford
85	Hednesford Town	1–0	Hyde United
86	Herne Bay	2–2	Bromley
87	Hertford Town	1–1	Tring Town
88	Highgate United	2–1	Willenhall Town
89	Hinckley Athletic	0–0	Tamworth
90	Histon	0–1	Chelmsford City
91	Hoddesdon Town	0–1	Boreham Wood
92	Hornchurch	0–1	Leyton Wingate
93	Horsham	4–1	Worthing
94	Horsham Y M C A	1–0	Ringmer
95	Horwich R M I	1–0	Barrow
96	Ilminster Town	0–2	Swaythling
97	Irthlingborough Diamonds	3–1	Stamford
98	King's Lynn	1–2	Wisbech Town
99	Letchworth Garden City	3–0	Rushden Town
100	Lewes	1–0	Ashford Town (Kent)
101	Llanelli	1–1	Worcester City
102	Long Eaton United	0–2	Stalybridge Celtic
103	Lowestoft Town	4–1	Newmarket Town
104	Lye Town	3–3	Banbury United
105	Lytham	0–1	Rossendale United
106	Macclesfield Town	0–2	Mossley
107	Maidenhead United	3–0	Windsor & Eton
108	March Town United	2–1	Skegness Town
109	Medway	0–1	Sutton United
110	Mexborough Town	1–3	Buxton
111	Nantwich Town	1–1	Bangor City
112	Netherfield	4–0	Willington
113	New Brighton	1–0	St Helens Town
114	New Mills	1–2	Curzon Ashton
115	Newbury Town	0–1	Bridgwater Town
116	Newport I O W	0–0	Waterlooville
117	Oswestry Town	2–0	Porthmadog
118	Oxford City	2–0	Racing Club Warwick
119	Parson Drove United	0–2	Boston
120	Peacehaven & Telscombe	1–1	Ramsgate
121	Penrith	3–3	Washington
122	Penzance	2–2	Tiverton Town
123	Poole Town	4–1	Selsey
124	Prescot Town	0–1	Darwen
125	Radcliffe Borough	2–6	South Liverpool
126	Rainham Town	0–5	Walthamstow Avenue
127	Redditch United	1–3	Wellingborough Town
128	Redhill	0–1	Eastbourne Town
129	Retford Town	1–2	Worksop Town
130	Rhyl	0–0	Congleton Town
131	Rothwell Town	4–1	Bourne Town
132	Salisbury	5–1	Cowes
133	Selby Town	3–1	Denaby United
134	Shildon	0–3	Blyth Spartans
135	Sidley United	0–0	Tonbridge
136	Sittingbourne	0–2	Haywards Heath
137	Snowdown Colliery Welfare	2–1	Cray Wanderers
138	Soham Town Rangers	0–2	Great Yarmouth Town
139	St Blazey	0–1	Bideford
140	St Neots Town	2–1	Thetford Town
141	Thame United	1–3	Bromsgrove Rovers
142	Ton Pentre	2–2	Weston Super Mare
143	Tow Law Town	0–4	Whitby Town

=== Replays ===
Tie	Home team	Score	Away team
4	Kidderminster Harriers	1–1	Alvechurch
6	Cheltenham Town	1–0	Atherstone Town
12	Hemel Hempstead	3–1	Barton Rovers
15	Harwich & Parkeston	1–4	Billericay Town
23	Durham City	1–0	Bridlington Town
29	Accrington Stanley	0–1	Burscough
32	Bury Town	1–2	Cambridge City
39	Wingate (Durham)	1–4	Consett
40	V S Rugby	0–2	Corby Town
42	Enderby Town	1–0	Coventry Sporting
45	Tunbridge Wells	0–2	Croydon
47	Fareham Town	1–2	Dorchester Town
50	Gloucester City	1–2	Dudley Town
52	Whitley Bay	3–2	Easington Colliery Welfare
58	Feltham	2–1	Epsom & Ewell
60	Merthyr Tydfil	2–1	Evesham United
75	Hungerford Town	3–0	Gosport Borough
76	Hillingdon Borough	4–1	Grays Athletic
77	Prestwich Heys	1–5	Great Harwood
78	Sutton Town	2–1	Gresley Rovers
80	Ware	3–3	Haringey Borough
82	Witney Town	2–1	Harrow Borough
83	Margate	1–2	Hastings United
86	Bromley	5–0	Herne Bay
87	Tring Town	2–3	Hertford Town
89	Tamworth	1–1	Hinckley Athletic
101	Worcester City	2–0	Llanelli
104	Banbury United	2–1	Lye Town
111	Bangor City	4–1	Nantwich Town
116	Waterlooville	0–1	Newport I O W
120	Ramsgate	1–0	Peacehaven & Telscombe
121	Washington	1–0	Penrith
122	Tiverton Town	3–1	Penzance
130	Congleton Town	0–2	Rhyl
135	Tonbridge	8–1	Sidley United
142	Weston Super Mare	3–2	Ton Pentre

=== 2nd replays ===
Tie	Home team	Score	Away team
4	Alvechurch	0–1	Kidderminster Harriers
80	Ware	0–1	Haringey Borough
89	Hinckley Athletic	2–1	Tamworth

== 2nd qualifying round ==
=== Ties ===
Tie	Home team	Score	Away team
1	Barking	1–3	Hillingdon Borough
2	Barnet	2–1	Erith & Belvedere
3	Boldon Community Association	2–1	Whitby Town
4	Brierley Hill Alliance	0–1	Halesowen Town
5	Brigg Town	1–0	Gainsborough Trinity
6	Burton Albion	2–1	Cheltenham Town
7	Calne Town	0–4	Merthyr Tydfil
8	Chertsey Town	1–1	Ilford
9	Cheshunt	2–1	Clapton
10	Chorley	1–0	Horwich R M I
11	Cinderford Town	0–4	Bridgend Town
12	Corinthian Casuals	0–2	Walthamstow Avenue
13	Crawley Town	3–2	Bromley
14	Crook Town	1–1	Blyth Spartans
15	Darlaston	0–1	Hinckley Athletic
16	Dorchester Town	4–3	Bridgwater Town
17	Dudley Town	0–2	A P Leamington
18	Dulwich Hamlet	1–1	Leyton Wingate
19	Durham City	1–2	Spennymoor United
20	Edgware Town	2–2	Boreham Wood
21	Enderby Town	5–0	Rothwell Town
22	Enfield	2–1	Gravesend & Northfleet
23	Farnborough Town	3–0	Newport I O W
24	Feltham	3–2	Maidenhead United
25	Finchley	2–2	Chesham United
26	Folkestone & Shepway	5–2	Eastbourne Town
27	Forest Green Rovers	0–2	Weston Super Mare
28	Formby	2–2	Darwen
29	Frickley Athletic	1–2	Appleby Frodingham
30	Goole Town	7–0	Selby Town
31	Gorleston	1–1	Chelmsford City
32	Great Harwood	0–1	Burscough
33	Hampton	1–1	Basingstoke Town
34	Haringey Borough	1–3	Billericay Town
35	Harlow Town	1–0	Cambridge City
36	Hastings United	5–1	Snowdown Colliery Welfare
37	Hednesford Town	1–0	Buxton
38	Hemel Hempstead	2–2	Letchworth Garden City
39	Hertford Town	1–0	Kempston Rovers
40	Highgate United	0–2	Kidderminster Harriers
41	Holbeach United	0–1	Boston
42	Horsham	3–2	Andover
43	Horsham Y M C A	4–1	Eastbourne United
44	Hungerford Town	0–1	Salisbury
45	Irthlingborough Diamonds	1–2	Corby Town
46	Lowestoft Town	4–1	Great Yarmouth Town
47	Maidstone United	5–0	Burgess Hill Town
48	March Town United	3–8	Arnold
49	Mossley	1–0	Curzon Ashton
50	Netherfield	1–1	Bishop Auckland
51	New Brighton	1–3	Winsford United
52	Newquay	2–3	Bideford
53	Oswestry Town	1–2	Rhyl
54	Oxford City	2–1	Bromsgrove Rovers
55	Poole Town	0–2	Frome Town
56	Ramsgate	2–0	Haywards Heath
57	Rossendale United	1–2	Runcorn
58	South Liverpool	2–2	Bangor City
59	St Albans City	2–0	Leytonstone
60	St Neots Town	4–4	Wisbech Town
61	Stalybridge Celtic	6–0	Sutton Town
62	Sutton United	2–0	Croydon
63	Swaythling	1–1	Bath City
64	Telford United	3–0	Leek Town
65	Tiverton Town	2–0	Chard Town
66	Tonbridge	1–0	Lewes
67	Washington	0–3	Consett
68	Wellingborough Town	1–2	Banbury United
69	Whitley Bay	3–1	Billingham Synthonia
70	Witney Town	0–3	Tilbury
71	Worcester City	1–0	Barry Town
72	Worksop Town	4–2	Emley

=== Replays ===
Tie	Home team	Score	Away team
8	Ilford	6–1	Chertsey Town
14	Blyth Spartans	3–0	Crook Town
18	Leyton Wingate	2–1	Dulwich Hamlet
20	Boreham Wood	4–2	Edgware Town
25	Chesham United	0–0	Finchley
28	Darwen	2–0	Formby
31	Chelmsford City	5–0	Gorleston
33	Basingstoke Town	0–2	Hampton
38	Letchworth Garden City	4–3	Hemel Hempstead
50	Bishop Auckland	1–1	Netherfield
58	Bangor City	1–0	South Liverpool
60	Wisbech Town	2–1	St Neots Town
63	Bath City	3–0	Swaythling

=== 2nd replays ===
Tie	Home team	Score	Away team
25	Finchley	3–2	Chesham United
50	Netherfield	3–4	Bishop Auckland

== 3rd qualifying round ==
=== Ties ===
Tie	Home team	Score	Away team
1	Appleby Frodingham	2–2	Brigg Town
2	Arnold	2–0	Boston
3	Banbury United	1–0	Oxford City
4	Bangor City	1–0	Rhyl
5	Bath City	2–0	Dorchester Town
6	Billericay Town	3–1	Walthamstow Avenue
7	Bishop Auckland	3–2	Boldon Community Association
8	Bridgend Town	1–3	Merthyr Tydfil
9	Burscough	3–0	Chorley
10	Burton Albion	1–0	Halesowen Town
11	Cheshunt	1–0	Hillingdon Borough
12	Consett	1–4	Blyth Spartans
13	Corby Town	1–2	Enderby Town
14	Enfield	4–0	Leyton Wingate
15	Finchley	1–5	Boreham Wood
16	Frome Town	2–2	Salisbury
17	Hampton	1–1	Ilford
18	Harlow Town	1–1	Chelmsford City
19	Hertford Town	0–3	Letchworth Garden City
20	Horsham	2–0	Farnborough Town
21	Horsham Y M C A	2–2	Folkestone & Shepway
22	Kidderminster Harriers	1–2	A P Leamington
23	Maidstone United	1–1	Crawley Town
24	Runcorn	2–0	Darwen
25	St Albans City	2–4	Barnet
26	Stalybridge Celtic	1–1	Hednesford Town
27	Sutton United	1–0	Hastings United
28	Telford United	1–0	Hinckley Athletic
29	Tilbury	4–1	Feltham
30	Tiverton Town	0–0	Bideford
31	Tonbridge	2–0	Ramsgate
32	Whitley Bay	2–2	Spennymoor United
33	Winsford United	1–1	Mossley
34	Wisbech Town	0–3	Lowestoft Town
35	Worcester City	1–1	Weston Super Mare
36	Worksop Town	2–2	Goole Town

=== Replays ===
Tie	Home team	Score	Away team
1	Brigg Town	1–2	Appleby Frodingham
16	Salisbury	1–0	Frome Town
17	Ilford	1–1	Hampton
18	Chelmsford City	2–1	Harlow Town
21	Folkestone & Shepway	3–0	Horsham Y M C A
23	Crawley Town	1–1	Maidstone United
26	Hednesford Town	2–1	Stalybridge Celtic
30	Bideford	3–0	Tiverton Town
32	Spennymoor United	4–1	Whitley Bay
33	Mossley	3–3	Winsford United
35	Weston Super Mare	1–2	Worcester City
36	Goole Town	2–2	Worksop Town

=== 2nd replays ===
Tie	Home team	Score	Away team
17	Hampton	2-0	Ilford
23	Maidstone United	4-1	Crawley Town
25	Finchley	3–2	Chesham United
50	Netherfield	3–4	Bishop Auckland

== 4th qualifying round ==
The teams that given byes to this round are Stafford Rangers, Wigan Athletic, Matlock Town, Altrincham, Morecambe, Dartford, Bishop's Stortford, Hendon, Grantham, Boston United, Kettering Town, Weymouth, Leatherhead, Hitchin Town, Tooting & Mitcham United, Marine, Minehead, Nuneaton Borough, Wealdstone and Northwich Victoria.

=== Ties ===
Tie	Home team	Score	Away team
1	Appleby Frodingham	0–2	Mossley
2	Arnold	3–0	Telford United
3	Bideford	1–0	Banbury United
4	Bishop Auckland	0–1	Blyth Spartans
5	Boreham Wood	3–2	Dartford
6	Boston United	1–2	A P Leamington
7	Burscough	0–0	Morecambe
8	Chelmsford City	0–3	Folkestone & Shepway
9	Goole Town	2–1	Matlock Town
10	Grantham	0–2	Burton Albion
11	Hampton	1–2	Barnet
12	Hendon	3–2	Billericay Town
13	Hitchin Town	2–2	Kettering Town
14	Horsham	0–4	Enfield
15	Leatherhead	4–1	Cheshunt
16	Letchworth Garden City	0–0	Enderby Town
17	Lowestoft Town	2–0	Bishop's Stortford
18	Marine	0–3	Wigan Athletic
19	Merthyr Tydfil	1–2	Bath City
20	Northwich Victoria	2–2	Stafford Rangers
21	Nuneaton Borough	2–1	Hednesford Town
22	Runcorn	2–1	Altrincham
23	Salisbury	1–1	Minehead
24	Spennymoor United	2–1	Bangor City
25	Tilbury	4–3	Tonbridge
26	Tooting & Mitcham United	3–0	Sutton United
27	Wealdstone	2–1	Maidstone United
28	Worcester City	2–2	Weymouth

=== Replays ===
Tie	Home team	Score	Away team
7	Morecambe	0–1	Burscough
13	Kettering Town	2–1	Hitchin Town
16	Enderby Town	1–0	Letchworth Garden City
20	Stafford Rangers	2–1	Northwich Victoria
23	Minehead	2–1	Salisbury
28	Weymouth	2–1	Worcester City

== 1977–78 FA Cup ==
See 1977-78 FA Cup for details of the rounds from the first round proper onwards.
