= Sam Cox (footballer, born 1920) =

English footballer

Personal information
- Full name: Samuel Cox
- Date of birth: 30 October 1920
- Place of birth: Mexborough, England
- Date of death: May 1985 (aged 64)
- Place of death: Mexborough, England
- Position: Full back

Senior career*
Years	Team	Apps	(Gls)
- Denaby United
1948–1949	West Bromwich Albion	2	(0)
1951–1952	Accrington Stanley	43	(0)
1952–1954	Scunthorpe & Lindsey United	3	(0)
Total		48	(0)
- * Club domestic league appearances and goals

Samuel Cox (30 October 1920 – May 1985) is an English former professional footballer who played as a full back in the Football League.

== Sources ==
- Hugman, Barry (2005). The PFA Premier and Football League Players' Records 1946-2005. Queen Anne Press.
