= Samuel Cox Jr. =

American lawyer and politician

Samuel Cox Jr. (March 1847 – May 1906) was an American lawyer and politician, a member of the Maryland General Assembly.

== Biography ==
Born in Charles County, Maryland, the son of John R. Robertson and adopted son of Col. Samuel Cox, his uncle, from whom he took his name. Cox attended Charlotte Hall and studied law under Judge Frederic Stone. Politically, he was a Democrat. In 1877, he was elected to the Maryland General Assembly. He served in the first administration of President Cleveland for four years as cashier of customs. In 1885, he was elected county commissioner. He died at home in 1906.
