= 1956–57 FA Cup qualifying rounds =

Tournament details
- Country: England; Wales

The FA Cup 1956–57 is the 76th season of the world's oldest football knockout competition; The Football Association Challenge Cup, or FA Cup for short. The large number of clubs entering the tournament from lower down the English football league system meant that the competition started with a number of preliminary and qualifying rounds. The 30 victorious teams from the fourth round qualifying progressed to the first round proper.

== Preliminary round ==
=== Ties ===
Tie	Home team	Score	Away team
1	Abingdon Town	0–3	Banbury Spencer
2	Altrincham	4–3	Northwich Victoria
3	Ashford Town (Kent)	3–1	Whitstable
4	Bangor City	2–2	Pwllheli & District
5	Barking	4–1	Tilbury
6	Barnet	2–1	Stevenage Town
7	Betteshanger Colliery Welfare	1–0	Maidstone United
8	Bilston	1–1	Wellington Town
9	Bishop's Stortford	3–0	Enfield
10	Brierley Hill Alliance	0–2	Stourbridge
11	Briggs Sports	4–0	Leyton
12	Bromley	5–3	Metropolitan Police
13	Bromsgrove Rovers	3–3	Cradley Heath
14	Cambridge City	2–1	Warboys Town
15	Chatham Town	2–4	Ramsgate Athletic
16	Chatteris Town	0–2	St Neots & District
17	Chelmsford City	1–0	Ilford
18	Cheltenham Town	3–0	Lovells Athletic
19	Chippenham Town	9–2	Calne & Harris United
20	Dagenham	0–1	Brentwood & Warley
21	Dartford	2–2	Gravesend & Northfleet
22	Deal Town	3–5	Sittingbourne
23	Dorking	0–1	Tunbridge Wells United
24	Dulwich Hamlet	1–2	Woking
25	Epsom	1–3	Bexleyheath & Welling
26	Erith & Belvedere	4–3	Sutton United
27	Finchley	5–0	Hemel Hempstead
28	Folkestone	0–1	Canterbury City
29	Halesowen Town	2–3	Stafford Rangers
30	Harwich & Parkeston	0–0	Clacton Town
31	Haywards Heath	2–3	Eastbourne
32	Histon	2–5	Ely City
33	Holbeach United	2–2	Cambridge United
34	Hyde United	4–4	Stalybridge Celtic
35	Kidderminster Harriers	3–0	Dudley Town
36	Kingstonian	2–2	Tonbridge
37	Letchworth Town	1–0	St Albans City
38	Leytonstone	6–2	Aveley
39	Littlehampton Town	1–2	Lancing Athletic
40	Lostock Gralam	2–1	Leek Town
41	Lytham	1–7	Horwich R M I
42	Macclesfield	2–1	Ellesmere Port Town
43	Maidenhead United	5–1	Huntley & Palmers
44	Margate	8–1	Sheppey United
45	Minehead	2–3	Wadebridge Town
46	New Brighton	1–0	Prescot Cables
47	Newhaven	1–5	Bognor Regis Town
48	Newmarket Town	1–6	March Town United
49	Redditch	4–1	Hednesford Town
50	Romford	4–2	Grays Athletic
51	Rossendale United	0–1	Mossley
52	Runcorn	1–1	Flint Town United
53	Skelmersdale United	3–0	Ashton United
54	Snowdown Colliery Welfare	0–0	Dover
55	South Liverpool	7–0	Earle
56	St Blazey	2–5	Bideford
57	St Helens Town	2–2	Marine
58	Stockton Heath	4–5	Winsford United
59	Sutton Coldfield Town	3–2	Moor Green
60	Uxbridge	3–2	Berkhamsted Town
61	Ware	1–1	Hitchin Town
62	Wealdstone	2–4	Hayes
63	Wells City	1–1	Street
64	Wembley	4–1	Edgware Town
65	Wimbledon	1–5	Tooting & Mitcham United
66	Witton Albion	2–1	Buxton
67	Woodford Town	0–5	Rainham Town
68	Worcester City	7–0	Darlaston
69	Worthing	3–2	Southwick
70	Yiewsley	1–0	Hendon

=== Replays ===
Tie	Home team	Score	Away team
4	Pwllheli & District	4–1	Bangor City
8	Wellington Town	3–2	Bilston
13	Cradley Heath	0–1	Bromsgrove Rovers
21	Gravesend & Northfleet	3–2	Dartford
30	Clacton Town	2–1	Harwich & Parkeston
33	Cambridge United	5–0	Holbeach United
34	Stalybridge Celtic	4–4	Hyde United
36	Tonbridge	6–1	Kingstonian
52	Flint Town United	1–2	Runcorn
54	Dover	1–2	Snowdown Colliery Welfare
57	Marine	2–1	St Helens Town
61	Hitchin Town	5–2	Ware
63	Street	0–0	Wells City

=== 2nd replays ===
Tie	Home team	Score	Away team
34	Hyde United	6–1	Stalybridge Celtic
63	Street	2–0	Wells City

== 1st qualifying round ==
=== Ties ===
Tie	Home team	Score	Away team
1	Altrincham	1–3	Macclesfield
2	Ashby Institute	0–0	Louth United
3	Ashford Town (Kent)	1–2	Canterbury City
4	Atherstone Town	4–0	Boldmere St Michaels
5	Aylesbury United	3–0	Slough Town
6	Bacup Borough	2–6	Mossley
7	Barking	2–2	Brentwood & Warley
8	Barnet	0–3	Eton Manor
9	Barton Town	0–1	Alford United
10	Bath City	2–0	Clandown
11	Biggleswade & District	2–3	Vauxhall Motors
12	Billingham Synthonia	2–1	Bridlington Central United
13	Bishop's Stortford	1–0	Hoddesdon Town
14	Bourne Town	2–0	Brigg Town
15	Bourneville Athletic	0–4	Bedworth Town
16	Bridgwater Town	4–0	Clevedon
17	Briggs Sports	0–1	Romford
18	Bromley	6–0	Erith & Belvedere
19	Brush Sports	2–2	Hinckley Athletic
20	Bury Town	1–1	Haverhill Rovers
21	Cambridge United	2–5	Ely City
22	Carshalton Athletic	4–9	Bexleyheath & Welling
23	Chelmsford City	6–0	Rainham Town
24	Chichester City	2–3	Andover
25	Chorley	4–1	Nelson
26	Clacton Town	1–1	Leytonstone
27	Cockfield	2–3	Stanley United
28	Congleton Town	3–3	Hyde United
29	Cowes	1–4	Gosport Borough Athletic
30	Cramlington Welfare	3–1	Gosforth & Coxlodge
31	Darwen	1–0	Leyland Motors
32	Dawdon Colliery Welfare	0–2	Consett
33	Devizes Town	0–2	Chippenham Town
34	Diss Town	6–3	Whitton United
35	Eastbourne	4–1	Bexhill Town
36	Ebbw Vale	2–5	Cheltenham Town
37	Evenwood Town	4–0	Tow Law Town
38	Ferryhill Athletic	0–3	Horden Colliery Welfare
39	Finchley	1–0	Wembley
40	Fleetwood	3–0	Lancaster City
41	Gloucester City	3–1	Barry Town
42	Grantham	2–1	Skegness Town
43	Gravesend & Northfleet	7–1	Betteshanger Colliery Welfare
44	Great Yarmouth Town	5–1	Gorleston
45	Gresley Rovers	7–3	Belper Town
46	Hallam	2–2	Norton Woodseats
47	Harrogate Railway Athletic	3–2	Ossett Town
48	Harrow Town	0–3	Southall
49	Hayes	0–2	Hounslow Town
50	Horwich R M I	2–1	Skelmersdale United
51	Ilfracombe Town	1–2	Bideford
52	Kidderminster Harriers	1–0	Redditch
53	King's Lynn	4–0	St Neots & District
54	Lancing Athletic	0–2	Bognor Regis Town
55	Langwith Miners Welfare	1–2	Creswell Colliery
56	Letchworth Town	0–0	Hertford Town
57	Linotype & Machinery	1–1	Winsford United
58	Llandudno	0–2	Earlestown
59	Llanelli	5–1	Merthyr Tydfil
60	Lockheed Leamington	3–1	Rugby Town
61	Long Eaton Town	9–0	Players Athletic
62	Lostock Gralam	1–0	Witton Albion
63	Lowestoft Town	8–1	Leiston
64	Maidenhead United	2–3	Oxford City
65	Marine	1–3	New Brighton
66	Marlow	6–1	Windsor & Eton
67	Melksham Town	2–2	Westbury United
68	Milnthorpe Corinthians	2–1	Burscough
69	Morpeth Town	0–5	North Shields
70	Peasedown Miners Welfare	0–2	Glastonbury
71	Pwllheli & District	1–4	South Liverpool
72	Ramsgate Athletic	1–2	Sittingbourne
73	Retford Town	3–3	Denaby United
74	Rothwell Town	0–1	Corby Town
75	Rushden Town	3–1	Stamford
76	Shefford Town	2–6	Hitchin Town
77	Shildon	2–2	West Auckland Town
78	Shotton Colliery Welfare	4–2	Wingate Welfare
79	Snowdown Colliery Welfare	2–2	Margate
80	South Normanton Miners Welfare	3–5	Clay Cross & Danesmoor Welfare
81	South Shields	3–0	Alnwick Town
82	Spalding United	3–2	Kettering Town
83	Spennymoor United	1–1	Blackhall Colliery Welfare
84	Stafford Rangers	1–1	Oswestry Town
85	Stonehouse	1–4	Cinderford Town
86	Stork	2–2	Runcorn
87	Street	1–2	Chippenham United
88	Sutton Coldfield Town	1–7	Tamworth
89	Sutton Town	3–2	Shirebrook Miners Welfare
90	Tavistock	3–4	Newquay
91	Thetford Town	0–2	Cambridge City
92	Tonbridge	3–3	Tooting & Mitcham United
93	Trowbridge Town	5–0	Frome Town
94	Truro City	3–4	Penzance
95	Tunbridge Wells United	3–0	Woking
96	Uxbridge	1–4	Yiewsley
97	Wadebridge Town	0–6	Taunton
98	Warminster Town	1–6	Salisbury
99	Wellington Town	8–2	Stourbridge
100	Whitley Bay	1–3	Ashington
101	Wigmore Athletic	1–4	Horsham
102	Wisbech Town	0–0	March Town United
103	Witney Town	1–0	Banbury Spencer
104	Wolsingham Welfare	1–6	Willington
105	Worcester City	0–1	Bromsgrove Rovers
106	Worthing	2–2	Redhill

=== Replays ===
Tie	Home team	Score	Away team
2	Louth United	5–0	Ashby Institute
7	Brentwood & Warley	2–1	Barking
19	Hinckley Athletic	5–1	Brush Sports
20	Haverhill Rovers	1–6	Bury Town
26	Leytonstone	0–1	Clacton Town
28	Hyde United	6–2	Congleton Town
46	Norton Woodseats	0–0	Hallam
56	Hertford Town	3–0	Letchworth Town
57	Winsford United	2–1	Linotype & Machinery
67	Westbury United	4–2	Melksham Town
73	Denaby United	3–0	Retford Town
77	West Auckland Town	2–1	Shildon
79	Margate	1–0	Snowdown Colliery Welfare
83	Blackhall Colliery Welfare	0–4	Spennymoor United
84	Oswestry Town	0–4	Stafford Rangers
86	Runcorn	3–2	Stork
92	Tooting & Mitcham United	2–1	Tonbridge
102	March Town United	2–1	Wisbech Town
106	Redhill	7–2	Worthing

=== 2nd replay ===
Tie	Home team	Score	Away team
46	Hallam	1–3	Norton Woodseats

== 2nd qualifying round ==
=== Ties ===
Tie	Home team	Score	Away team
1	Andover	3–2	Bournemouth Gasworks Athletic
2	Annfield Plain	4–2	Consett
3	Atherstone Town	4–0	Lockheed Leamington (Replay Ordered?)
4	Aylesbury United	2–0	Oxford City
5	Bath City	1–2	Bridgwater Town
6	Bentley Colliery	2–1	Upton Colliery
7	Bexleyheath & Welling	2–5	Bromley
8	Bideford	4–0	Newquay
9	Bishop's Stortford	0–2	Eton Manor
10	Bourne Town	2–8	Grantham
11	Brentwood & Warley	0–1	Clacton Town
12	Bromsgrove Rovers	4–0	Kidderminster Harriers
13	Bungay Town	2–2	Beccles
14	Cambridge City	0–1	Ely City
15	Chelmsford City	4–0	Romford
16	Clay Cross & Danesmoor Welfare	3–1	Gresley Rovers
17	Corby Town	6–0	Wellingborough Town
18	Cramlington Welfare	0–6	South Shields
19	Creswell Colliery	0–6	Ransome & Marles
20	Darwen	1–1	Mossley
21	Diss Town	2–4	Bury Town
22	Dunstable Town	3–0	Vauxhall Motors
23	Earlestown	1–6	New Brighton
24	Evenwood Town	2–1	Willington
25	Farsley Celtic	1–0	Yorkshire Amateur
26	Finchley	1–2	Yiewsley
27	Fleetwood	2–1	Penrith
28	Frickley Colliery	3–2	Denaby United
29	Glastonbury	3–2	Chippenham United
30	Gloucester City	1–2	Cheltenham Town
31	Goole Town	4–0	Harrogate Railway Athletic
32	Heanor Town	2–0	Whitwick Colliery
33	Hertford Town	0–1	Hitchin Town
34	Horden Colliery Welfare	10–0	Chilton Athletic
35	Horsham	2–0	Eastbourne
36	Horwich R M I	3–0	Chorley
37	Hyde United	5–2	Lostock Gralam
38	Ilkeston Town	2–0	Boots Athletic
39	Linby Colliery	0–3	Sutton Town
40	Llanelli	3–0	Cinderford Town
41	Long Eaton Town	3–4	Hinckley Athletic
42	Louth United	1–1	Alford United
43	Lowestoft Town	0–1	Sudbury Town
44	March Town United	4–1	King's Lynn
45	Margate	2–0	Canterbury City
46	Milnthorpe Corinthians	1–4	Morecambe
47	North Shields	1–0	Ashington
48	North Skelton Athletic	1–3	Billingham Synthonia
49	Norton Woodseats	2–1	Sheffield
50	Penzance	1–1	Taunton
51	Poole Town	3–0	Bridport
52	Portland United	9–0	Ilminster Town
53	Redhill	3–0	Bognor Regis Town
54	Runcorn	0–1	South Liverpool
55	Rushden Town	0–3	Spalding United
56	Salisbury	1–2	Chippenham Town
57	Sheringham	0–2	Great Yarmouth Town
58	Shotton Colliery Welfare	3–0	Boldon Colliery Welfare
59	Sittingbourne	1–0	Gravesend & Northfleet
60	Southall	2–1	Hounslow Town
61	Spennymoor United	3–1	Durham City
62	Stocksbridge Works	8–2	Beighton Miners Welfare
63	Tamworth	1–4	Bedworth Town
64	Trowbridge Town	5–2	Westbury United
65	Tunbridge Wells United	2–3	Tooting & Mitcham United
66	Wellington Town	4–1	Stafford Rangers
67	West Auckland Town	0–0	Stanley United
68	Whitby Town	5–1	South Bank
69	Winchester City	3–0	Gosport Borough Athletic
70	Winsford United	2–2	Macclesfield
71	Witney Town	1–1	Marlow
72	Wolverton Town & B R	4–3	Eynesbury Rovers

=== Replays ===
Tie	Home team	Score	Away team
3	Lockheed Leamington	2–1	Atherstone Town
13	Beccles	4–4	Bungay Town
20	Mossley	3–0	Darwen
42	Alford United	2–1	Louth United
50	Taunton	3–3	Penzance
67	Stanley United	2–0	West Auckland Town
70	Macclesfield	4–1	Winsford United
71	Marlow	0–4	Witney Town

=== 2nd replays ===
Tie	Home team	Score	Away team
13	Bungay Town	3–0	Beccles
50	Taunton	3–2	Penzance

== 3rd qualifying round ==
=== Ties ===
Tie	Home team	Score	Away team
1	Alford United	1–2	Grantham
2	Aylesbury United	7–0	Witney Town
3	Bedworth Town	2–4	Lockheed Leamington
4	Bentley Colliery	1–2	Frickley Colliery
5	Bromsgrove Rovers	1–0	Wellington Town
6	Bury Town	0–0	Sudbury Town
7	Chelmsford City	2–2	Clacton Town
8	Cheltenham Town	4–0	Llanelli
9	Chippenham Town	4–1	Trowbridge Town
10	Clay Cross & Danesmoor Welfare	1–8	Ilkeston Town
11	Corby Town	3–1	Spalding United
12	Dunstable Town	3–1	Wolverton Town & B R
13	Ely City	2–0	March Town United
14	Eton Manor	3–1	Hitchin Town
15	Evenwood Town	5–1	Stanley United
16	Fleetwood	3–3	Morecambe
17	Glastonbury	4–3	Bridgwater Town
18	Goole Town	9–0	Farsley Celtic
19	Great Yarmouth Town	4–0	Bungay Town
20	Hinckley Athletic	4–1	Heanor Town
21	Horden Colliery Welfare	3–0	Spennymoor United
22	Horsham	2–1	Redhill
23	Horwich R M I	1–0	Mossley
24	Macclesfield	4–4	Hyde United
25	New Brighton	6–1	South Liverpool
26	North Shields	1–1	South Shields
27	Poole Town	2–0	Portland United
28	Shotton Colliery Welfare	2–3	Annfield Plain
29	Sittingbourne	2–3	Margate
30	Southall	0–1	Yiewsley
31	Stocksbridge Works	3–2	Norton Woodseats
32	Sutton Town	4–1	Ransome & Marles
33	Taunton	1–7	Bideford
34	Tooting & Mitcham United	4–0	Bromley
35	Whitby Town	2–3	Billingham Synthonia
36	Winchester City	0–2	Andover

=== Replays ===
Tie	Home team	Score	Away team
6	Sudbury Town	3–1	Bury Town
7	Clacton Town	0–0	Chelmsford City
16	Morecambe	3–2	Fleetwood
24	Hyde United	3–3	Macclesfield
26	South Shields	2–1	North Shields

=== 2nd replay ===
Tie	Home team	Score	Away team
7	Chelmsford City	1–2	Clacton Town
24	Macclesfield	3–5	Hyde United

== 4th qualifying round ==
The teams that given byes to this round are Crook Town, Walthamstow Avenue, Yeovil Town, Gainsborough Trinity, Weymouth, Rhyl, Hereford United, Wigan Athletic, Blyth Spartans, Peterborough United, Headington United, Hastings United, Guildford City, Nuneaton Borough, Selby Town, Newport I O W, Boston United, Scarborough, Netherfield, Dorchester Town, Worksop Town, Wycombe Wanderers, Burton Albion and Easington Colliery Welfare.

=== Ties ===
Tie	Home team	Score	Away team
1	Bideford	1–1	Dorchester Town
2	Billingham Synthonia	8–3	Crook Town
3	Blyth Spartans	3–0	Annfield Plain
4	Boston United	6–3	Grantham
5	Burton Albion	6–1	Hinckley Athletic
6	Cheltenham Town	2–1	Andover
7	Chippenham Town	0–0	Weymouth
8	Clacton Town	2–3	Yiewsley
9	Corby Town	1–5	Peterborough United
10	Dunstable Town	5–1	Eton Manor
11	Easington Colliery Welfare	0–3	Evenwood Town
12	Ely City	1–0	Sudbury Town
13	Goole Town	2–1	Gainsborough Trinity
14	Headington United	0–2	Guildford City
15	Horsham	0–2	Hastings United
16	Ilkeston Town	2–2	Sutton Town
17	Lockheed Leamington	1–4	Hereford United
18	Morecambe	3–2	Horwich R M I
19	New Brighton	4–1	Hyde United
20	Nuneaton Borough	1–2	Bromsgrove Rovers
21	Poole Town	0–3	Newport I O W
22	Rhyl	2–0	Frickley Colliery
23	Selby Town	3–1	Stocksbridge Works
24	South Shields	1–0	Horden Colliery Welfare
25	Tooting & Mitcham United	3–1	Aylesbury United
26	Walthamstow Avenue	6–0	Great Yarmouth Town
27	Wigan Athletic	2–2	Netherfield
28	Worksop Town	1–4	Scarborough
29	Wycombe Wanderers	2–4	Margate
30	Yeovil Town	3–1	Glastonbury

=== Replays ===
Tie	Home team	Score	Away team
1	Dorchester Town	3–0	Bideford
7	Weymouth	4–1	Chippenham Town
16	Sutton Town	1–2	Ilkeston Town
27	Netherfield	3–3	Wigan Athletic

=== 2nd replay ===
Tie	Home team	Score	Away team
27	Wigan Athletic	2–0	Netherfield

== 1956–57 FA Cup ==
See 1956-57 FA Cup for details of the rounds from the first round proper onwards.
