= 1968–69 FA Cup qualifying rounds =

Tournament details
- Country: England; Wales

The FA Cup 1968–69 is the 88th season of the world's oldest football knockout competition; The Football Association Challenge Cup, or FA Cup for short. The large number of clubs entering the tournament from lower down the English football league system meant that the competition started with a number of preliminary and qualifying rounds. The 30 victorious teams from the fourth round qualifying progressed to the first round proper.

== Preliminary round ==
=== Ties ===
Tie	Home team	Score	Away team
1	Belper Town	2–2	Bedworth Town
2	Burton Albion	1–3	Bromsgrove Rovers
3	Desborough Town	3–0	Chatteris Town
4	Droylsden	0–3	Skelmersdale United
5	Fleetwood	5–0	Milnthorpe Corinthians
6	Goole Town	4–1	Barton Town
7	Hayes	1–3	Brentwood Town
8	Hinckley Athletic	1–1	Lower Gornal Athletic
9	Horsham	2–3	Bognor Regis Town
10	Ilkeston Town	1–1	Wombwell Sporting Association
11	Lockheed Leamington	2–2	Hednesford
12	Long Eaton United	2–1	Loughborough United
13	March Town United	1–1	Cambridge United
14	Marlow	1–4	Banbury United
15	Mexborough Town	1–1	Denaby United
16	Mossley	1–0	Guinness Exports
17	Nantwich	5–4	Sandbach Ramblers
18	Nelson	0–4	Netherfield
19	Poole Town	4–0	Melksham Town
20	Rhyl	5–1	Prescot Town
21	Rushden Town	0–1	St Neots Town
22	Selsey	1–0	Andover
23	Stratford Town Amateurs	1–3	Wellington Town

=== Replays ===
Tie	Home team	Score	Away team
1	Bedworth Town	3–2	Belper Town
8	Lower Gornal Athletic	3–2	Hinckley Athletic
10	Wombwell Sporting Association	1–5	Ilkeston Town
11	Hednesford	4–1	Lockheed Leamington
13	Cambridge United	5–0	March Town United
15	Denaby United	3–2	Mexborough Town

== 1st qualifying round ==
=== Ties ===
Tie	Home team	Score	Away team
1	Abergavenny Thursdays	4–1	Stonehouse
2	Alfreton Town	1–2	Matlock Town
3	Alvechurch	3–2	Redditch
4	Amersham Town	1–5	Erith & Belvedere
5	Ashby Institute	0–3	Selby Town
6	Ashton United	1–6	Witton Albion
7	Atherstone Town	4–2	Long Eaton United
8	Aveley	0–1	Tooting & Mitcham United
9	Aylesbury United	1–0	Wembley
10	Bacup Borough	0–1	Rossendale United
11	Banstead Athletic	1–1	Uxbridge
12	Barking	0–1	Windsor & Eton
13	Bedford Town	5–0	Histon
14	Bedworth Town	3–3	Rugby Town
15	Bexley United	1–0	Sutton United
16	Bideford	2–2	Barnstaple Town
17	Billingham Synthonia	2–0	Ashington
18	Bishop Auckland	2–1	Gateshead
19	Bishop's Stortford	6–0	Wolverton Town & B R
20	Bletchley Town	0–0	Maidenhead United
21	Blyth Spartans	4–3	Spennymoor United
22	Bourne Town	2–3	Wisbech Town
23	Bridlington Town	1–1	Hull Brunswick
24	Bridport	9–1	Warminster Town
25	Brierley Hill Alliance	1–5	Lower Gornal Athletic
26	Brigg Town	1–5	Goole Town
27	Bromsgrove Rovers	1–1	Stafford Rangers
28	Burscough	3–1	Ellesmere Port Town
29	Cambridge City	0–0	St Neots Town
30	Canterbury City	1–0	Whitstable Town
31	Carshalton Athletic	4–5	Metropolitan Police
32	Chatham Town	1–6	Sittingbourne
33	Cheltenham Town	2–1	Lovells Athletic
34	Chichester City	1–0	Fleet Town
35	Chippenham Town	2–4	Welton Rovers
36	Clacton Town	4–2	Thetford Town
37	Clapton	1–1	Malden Town
38	Clitheroe	0–0	Great Harwood
39	Congleton Town	0–1	Winsford United
40	Consett	2–0	Ryhope Colliery Welfare
41	Corinthian Casuals	6–4	Rainham Town
42	Cowes	0–1	Thornycroft Athletic
43	Crittall Athletic	1–1	Ware
44	Crook Town	2–3	Stockton
45	Dagenham	2–2	Ruislip Manor
46	Dartford	4–0	Hornchurch
47	Darwen	1–4	Skelmersdale United
48	Deal Town	2–2	Snowdown Colliery Welfare
49	Desborough Town	0–4	Stamford
50	Dorchester Town	2–5	Poole Town
51	Dorking	1–2	Addlestone
52	Dover	5–2	Tonbridge
53	Dudley Town	0–2	Bilston
54	Dulwich Hamlet	0–1	Woodford Town
55	Durham City	1–0	Willington
56	Eastbourne	2–0	Lancing
57	Eastwood Hanley	2–3	Ilkeston Town
58	Eastwood Town	2–2	Heanor Town
59	Ely City	4–1	Newmarket Town
60	Evenwood Town	7–1	Annfield Plain
61	Fareham Town	2–3	Wokingham Town
62	Farsley Celtic	1–2	Retford Town
63	Finchley	2–2	Hounslow
64	Fleetwood	0–0	Penrith
65	Folkestone	1–3	Margate
66	Gainsborough Trinity	4–0	Denaby United
67	Gloucester City	3–1	Devizes Town
68	Gorleston	2–1	Harwich & Parkeston
69	Gravesend & Northfleet	1–3	Cray Wanderers
70	Grays Athletic	1–4	Southall
71	Great Yarmouth Town	0–0	Bury Town
72	Gresley Rovers	1–0	Arnold
73	Halesowen Town	0–1	Wellington Town
74	Hampton	1–6	Kingstonian
75	Harlow Town	0–3	Brentwood Town
76	Hastings United	1–1	Ramsgate Athletic
77	Hatfield Main	5–0	Yorkshire Amateur
78	Haywards Heath	1–1	Bognor Regis Town
79	Hednesford	1–2	Worcester City
80	Hertford Town	0–0	Hendon
81	Hillingdon Borough	7–0	Bromley
82	Hitchin Town	3–1	Cheshunt
83	Hoddesdon Town	1–1	Baldock Town
84	Holbeach United	1–1	Spalding United
85	Holyhead Town	2–3	Bangor City
86	Horden Colliery Welfare	2–1	Whitby Town
87	Hyde United	2–2	Mossley
88	Ilford	0–1	Edmonton
89	Kettering Town	1–0	Cambridge United
90	Kirkby Town	3–1	New Brighton
91	Lancaster City	7–3	Lytham
92	Leatherhead	5–0	Molesey
93	Letchworth Town	2–3	Banbury United
94	Leyton	3–2	Hemel Hempstead
95	Littlehampton Town	1–2	Eastbourne United
96	Llanelli	2–1	Ton Pentre
97	Lostock Gralam	4–2	Nantwich
98	Louth United	3–1	Boston
99	Maidstone United	1–2	Ashford Town (Kent)
100	Marine	0–0	Rhyl
101	Merthyr Tydfil	1–4	Cinderford Town
102	Minehead	1–2	Frome Town
103	Morecambe	4–0	Netherfield
104	Murton Colliery Welfare	1–0	Ferryhill Athletic
105	Newport I O W	3–2	Selsey
106	North Shields	3–0	Boldon Colliery Welfare
107	Northwich Victoria	3–0	Linotype & Machinery
108	Norton Woodseats	0–3	Buxton
109	Penzance	3–4	Falmouth Town
110	Potton United	1–2	Wellingborough Town
111	Pwllheli & District	0–5	Porthmadog
112	Rawmarsh Welfare	0–0	Sutton Town
113	Redhill	3–0	Ford United
114	Rothwell Town	2–3	Biggleswade & District
115	Ryde Sports	1–7	Salisbury
116	Scarborough	0–0	Bridlington Trinity
117	Sheppey United	1–1	Herne Bay
118	Skegness Town	0–3	King's Lynn
119	Slough Town	2–1	Feltham
120	Soham Town Rangers	6–0	Eynesbury Rovers
121	South Liverpool	4–2	Oswestry Town
122	Southwick	1–1	Worthing
123	St Blazey	2–2	Nanpean Rovers
124	St Helens Town	0–0	Chorley
125	Staines Town	0–4	Croydon Amateurs
126	Stalybridge Celtic	3–2	Leyland Motors
127	Stourbridge	7–4	Lye Town
128	Street	2–2	Bridgwater Town
129	Sudbury Town	1–0	Gothic
130	Tamworth	1–2	Darlaston
131	Tilbury	1–0	Epsom & Ewell
132	Trowbridge Town	3–0	Portland United
133	Vauxhall Motors	6–1	Harrow Borough
134	Walton & Hersham	7–1	Huntley & Palmers
135	Waterlooville	2–1	Basingstoke Town
136	Wealdstone	3–2	Dunstable Town
137	West Auckland Town	3–2	Stanley United
138	Westbury United	3–1	Glastonbury
139	Whitley Bay	0–1	Shildon
140	Wigan Rovers	1–1	Horwich R M I
141	Woking	2–1	Crawley Town
142	Worksop Town	2–4	Frickley Colliery
143	Wycombe Wanderers	0–0	St Albans City

=== Replays ===
Tie	Home team	Score	Away team
11	Uxbridge	3–1	Banstead Athletic
14	Rugby Town	0–2	Bedworth Town
16	Barnstaple Town	0–1	Bideford
20	Maidenhead United	1–0	Bletchley Town
23	Hull Brunswick	3–2	Bridlington Town
27	Stafford Rangers	2–1	Bromsgrove Rovers
29	St Neots Town	3–3	Cambridge City
37	Malden Town	2–1	Clapton
38	Great Harwood	0–1	Clitheroe
43	Ware	2–1	Crittall Athletic
45	Ruislip Manor	1–6	Dagenham
48	Snowdown Colliery Welfare	2–1	Deal Town
58	Heanor Town	5–1	Eastwood Town
63	Hounslow	4–2	Finchley
64	Penrith	0–5	Fleetwood
71	Bury Town	1–0	Great Yarmouth Town
76	Ramsgate Athletic	0–1	Hastings United
78	Bognor Regis Town	2–3	Haywards Heath
80	Hendon	1–0	Hertford Town
83	Baldock Town	0–2	Hoddesdon Town
84	Spalding United	2–5	Holbeach United
87	Mossley	2–1	Hyde United
100	Rhyl	0–1	Marine
112	Sutton Town	4–1	Rawmarsh Welfare
116	Bridlington Trinity	1–1	Scarborough (Abandoned in extra time)
117	Herne Bay	3–5	Sheppey United
122	Worthing	4–4	Southwick (Abandoned in extra time)
123	Nanpean Rovers	1–1	St Blazey
124	Chorley	0–1	St Helens Town
128	Bridgwater Town	2–1	Street
140	Horwich R M I	2–0	Wigan Rovers
143	St Albans City	1–0	Wycombe Wanderers

=== 2nd replay ===
Tie	Home team	Score	Away team
29	Cambridge City	3–0	St Neots Town
116	Scarborough	3–1	Bridlington Trinity
122	Southwick	5–3	Worthing
123	Nanpean Rovers	2–0	St Blazey

== 2nd qualifying round ==
=== Ties ===
Tie	Home team	Score	Away team
1	Abergavenny Thursdays	2–2	Cheltenham Town
2	Aylesbury United	2–1	Maidenhead United
3	Bedworth Town	2–2	Heanor Town
4	Biggleswade & District	2–1	Cambridge City
5	Bilston	3–0	Lower Gornal Athletic
6	Bishop Auckland	2–1	Horden Colliery Welfare
7	Bishop's Stortford	9–0	Corinthian Casuals
8	Blyth Spartans	1–2	Billingham Synthonia
9	Bridport	1–4	Frome Town
10	Buxton	1–0	Ilkeston Town
11	Canterbury City	2–0	Sittingbourne
12	Cinderford Town	3–0	Llanelli
13	Clacton Town	2–3	Gorleston
14	Consett	4–3	Evenwood Town
15	Croydon Amateurs	0–2	Brentwood Town
16	Dagenham	1–2	Dartford
17	Dover	2–3	Ashford Town (Kent)
18	Eastbourne United	3–0	Haywards Heath
19	Falmouth Town	2–1	Bideford
20	Fleetwood	2–0	Clitheroe
21	Frickley Colliery	2–1	Gainsborough Trinity
22	Gresley Rovers	0–4	Atherstone Town
23	Hastings United	7–3	Snowdown Colliery Welfare
24	Hatfield Main	2–2	Retford Town
25	Hitchin Town	3–1	Woodford Town
26	Horwich R M I	1–5	Mossley
27	King's Lynn	3–1	Louth United
28	Lancaster City	2–4	Morecambe
29	Leyton	1–1	Edmonton
30	Murton Colliery Welfare	0–4	North Shields
31	Northwich Victoria	2–1	Lostock Gralam
32	Poole Town	4–0	Westbury United
33	Porthmadog	1–8	Bangor City
34	Redhill	1–0	Cray Wanderers
35	Salisbury	4–0	Thornycroft Athletic
36	Scarborough	0–2	Goole Town
37	Selby Town	2–1	Hull Brunswick
38	Sheppey United	0–6	Margate
39	Shildon	3–1	Durham City
40	Slough Town	2–1	Hendon
41	Soham Town Rangers	0–1	Kettering Town
42	South Liverpool	2–0	Marine
43	Southall	0–0	Kingstonian
44	Southwick	1–2	Eastbourne
45	St Albans City	3–2	Erith & Belvedere
46	St Helens Town	0–1	Skelmersdale United
47	Stafford Rangers	2–0	Darlaston
48	Stalybridge Celtic	2–2	Burscough
49	Stamford	1–0	Bedford Town
50	Stockton	2–1	West Auckland Town
51	Stourbridge	0–2	Wellington Town
52	Sudbury Town	1–1	Bury Town
53	Sutton Town	0–1	Matlock Town
54	Tilbury	0–3	Hillingdon Borough
55	Tooting & Mitcham United	0–1	Bexley United
56	Trowbridge Town	2–3	Bridgwater Town
57	Uxbridge	2–2	Metropolitan Police
58	Vauxhall Motors	1–0	Hoddesdon Town
59	Wadebridge Town	1–1	Nanpean Rovers
60	Walton & Hersham	4–1	Leatherhead
61	Ware	3–2	Hounslow
62	Waterlooville	3–0	Newport I O W
63	Wealdstone	3–1	Banbury United
64	Wellingborough Town	3–1	Ely City
65	Welton Rovers	1–2	Gloucester City
66	Windsor & Eton	2–2	Malden Town
67	Winsford United	2–4	Kirkby Town
68	Wisbech Town	3–1	Holbeach United
69	Witton Albion	4–3	Rossendale United
70	Woking	5–2	Addlestone
71	Wokingham Town	5–0	Chichester City
72	Worcester City	0–0	Alvechurch

=== Replays ===
Tie	Home team	Score	Away team
1	Cheltenham Town	3–2	Abergavenny Thursdays
3	Heanor Town	1–0	Bedworth Town
24	Retford Town	1–0	Hatfield Main
29	Edmonton	2–1	Leyton
43	Kingstonian	3–1	Southall
48	Burscough	2–4	Stalybridge Celtic
52	Bury Town	3–2	Sudbury Town
57	Metropolitan Police	3–3	Uxbridge
59	Nanpean Rovers	0–7	Wadebridge Town
66	Malden Town	3–2	Windsor & Eton
72	Alvechurch	0–1	Worcester City

=== 2nd replay ===
Tie	Home team	Score	Away team
57	Metropolitan Police	3–1	Uxbridge

== 3rd qualifying round ==
=== Ties ===
Tie	Home team	Score	Away team
1	Ashford Town (Kent)	3–4	Canterbury City
2	Atherstone Town	3–2	Heanor Town
3	Bangor City	3–1	South Liverpool
4	Biggleswade & District	1–2	Stamford
5	Billingham Synthonia	0–2	Bishop Auckland
6	Bilston	3–2	Stafford Rangers
7	Brentwood Town	2–1	Metropolitan Police
8	Bridgwater Town	0–1	Frome Town
9	Bury Town	4–1	Gorleston
10	Buxton	0–3	Matlock Town
11	Cinderford Town	1–3	Cheltenham Town
12	Eastbourne United	2–3	Eastbourne
13	Edmonton	1–1	Kingstonian
14	Frickley Colliery	0–0	Retford Town
15	Goole Town	3–0	Selby Town
16	Hillingdon Borough	3–0	Bexley United
17	Hitchin Town	0–2	St Albans City
18	Kettering Town	4–1	Wellingborough Town
19	King's Lynn	5–3	Wisbech Town
20	Margate	4–0	Hastings United
21	Morecambe	1–0	Fleetwood
22	Mossley	2–0	Witton Albion
23	North Shields	2–1	Shildon
24	Northwich Victoria	4–2	Kirkby Town
25	Poole Town	1–1	Gloucester City
26	Redhill	2–4	Dartford
27	Skelmersdale United	3–1	Stalybridge Celtic
28	Slough Town	2–0	Bishop's Stortford
29	Stockton	0–3	Consett
30	Vauxhall Motors	3–3	Ware
31	Wadebridge Town	2–2	Falmouth Town
32	Walton & Hersham	4–0	Malden Town
33	Waterlooville	4–2	Salisbury
34	Wealdstone	2–1	Aylesbury United
35	Wellington Town	2–3	Worcester City
36	Woking	3–2	Wokingham Town

=== Replays ===
Tie	Home team	Score	Away team
13	Kingstonian	2–0	Edmonton
14	Retford Town	0–0	Frickley Colliery
25	Gloucester City	1–2	Poole Town
30	Ware	2–1	Vauxhall Motors
31	Falmouth Town	3–1	Wadebridge Town

=== 2nd replay ===
Tie	Home team	Score	Away team
14	Retford Town	3–0	Frickley Colliery

== 4th qualifying round ==
The teams that given byes to this round are Enfield, Wimbledon, Yeovil Town, Hereford United, South Shields, Chelmsford City, Bath City, Weymouth, Romford, Wigan Athletic, Corby Town, Guildford City, Grantham, Altrincham, Kidderminster Harriers, Nuneaton Borough, Oxford City, Runcorn, Barnet, Macclesfield Town, Boston United, Walthamstow Avenue, Tow Law Town and Lowestoft Town.

=== Ties ===
Tie	Home team	Score	Away team
1	Altrincham	2–0	Wigan Athletic
2	Barnet	4–2	Enfield
3	Bath City	0–2	Yeovil Town
4	Bilston	2–0	Matlock Town
5	Bishop Auckland	2–3	Goole Town
6	Boston United	2–2	Grantham
7	Corby Town	0–1	St Albans City
8	Eastbourne	2–2	Canterbury City
9	Falmouth Town	2–2	Waterlooville
10	Frome Town	1–2	Cheltenham Town
11	Guildford City	0–1	Dartford
12	Hereford United	4–1	Worcester City
13	Hillingdon Borough	0–0	Brentwood Town
14	Kettering Town	2–0	Atherstone Town
15	King's Lynn	3–0	Lowestoft Town
16	Kingstonian	3–3	Chelmsford City
17	Margate	1–0	Walton & Hersham
18	Mossley	1–2	Morecambe
19	North Shields	1–3	Tow Law Town
20	Northwich Victoria	1–3	Skelmersdale United
21	Nuneaton Borough	1–1	Kidderminster Harriers
22	Oxford City	7–1	Romford
23	Retford Town	0–2	Macclesfield Town
24	Runcorn	1–4	Bangor City
25	Slough Town	1–1	Wealdstone
26	South Shields	1–1	Consett
27	Stamford	0–2	Bury Town
28	Ware	1–0	Walthamstow Avenue
29	Weymouth	1–1	Poole Town
30	Wimbledon	0–2	Woking

=== Replays ===
Tie	Home team	Score	Away team
6	Grantham	2–1	Boston United
8	Canterbury City	4–2	Eastbourne
9	Waterlooville	1–1	Falmouth Town
13	Brentwood Town	2–0	Hillingdon Borough
16	Chelmsford City	5–3	Kingstonian
21	Kidderminster Harriers	3–0	Nuneaton Borough
25	Wealdstone	2–0	Slough Town
26	Consett	0–6	South Shields
29	Poole Town	0–1	Weymouth

=== 2nd replay ===
Tie	Home team	Score	Away team
9	Falmouth Town	0–2	Waterlooville

== 1968–69 FA Cup ==
See 1968-69 FA Cup for details of the rounds from the first round proper onwards.
