= 1973–74 FA Cup qualifying rounds =

Tournament details
- Country: England; Wales

The FA Cup 1973–74 is the 93rd season of the world's oldest football knockout competition; The Football Association Challenge Cup, or FA Cup for short. The large number of clubs entering the tournament from lower down the English football league system meant that the competition started with a number of preliminary and qualifying rounds. The 28 victorious teams from the fourth round qualifying progressed to the first round proper.

== Preliminary round ==
=== Ties ===
| Tie | Home team | Score | Away team |
|---|---|---|---|
| 1 | Feltham | 1–3 | Edmonton & Haringey |
| 2 | Kingstonian | 4–0 | Grays Athletic |
| 3 | Letchworth Town | 2–1 | Ely City |
| 4 | Maidenhead United | 2–0 | Hemel Hempstead |
| 5 | Matlock Town | 3–0 | Heanor Town |
| 6 | New Brighton | 1–1 | Hyde United |
| 7 | Newport I O W | 1–1 | Fareham Town |
| 8 | Oldbury United | 0–1 | Lye Town |
| 9 | Ormskirk | 2–0 | Leyland Motors |
| 10 | Oswestry Town | 1–3 | Northwich Victoria |
| 11 | Rainham Town | 1–2 | Horsham |
| 12 | Ramsgate | 2–1 | Herne Bay |
| 13 | Rawmarsh Welfare | 2–1 | Hatfield Main |
| 14 | Redditch United | 1–3 | A P Leamington |
| 15 | Retford Town | 2–1 | Louth United |
| 16 | Soham Town Rangers | 1–2 | Lowestoft Town |
| 17 | Stevenage Athletic | 6–1 | Rushden Town |
| 18 | Stocksbridge Works | 4–4 | Prestwich Heys |
| 19 | Sutton Coldfield Town | 0–2 | Eastwood Town |
| 20 | Sutton United | 3–0 | Metropolitan Police |
| 21 | Thetford Town | 3–0 | Spalding United |
| 22 | Truro City | 0–2 | Penzance |
| 23 | Tunbridge Wells | 5–1 | Ringmer |
| 24 | Waterlooville | 4–0 | Sidley United |
| 25 | Wealdstone | 6–1 | Marlow |
| 26 | Welton Rovers | 1–4 | Mangotsfield United |
| 27 | Wembley | 0–1 | Southall |
| 28 | Westbury United | 0–2 | Salisbury |
| 29 | Woking | 2–1 | Tonbridge |

=== Replays ===
| Tie | Home team | Score | Away team |
|---|---|---|---|
| 6 | Hyde United | 2–1 | New Brighton |
| 7 | Fareham Town | 0–1 | Newport I O W |
| 18 | Prestwich Heys | 6–0 | Stocksbridge Works |

== 1st qualifying round ==
=== Ties ===
| Tie | Home team | Score | Away team |
|---|---|---|---|
| 1 | Addlestone | 1–3 | Boreham Wood |
| 2 | Alfreton Town | 3–1 | Burton Albion |
| 3 | Alton Town | 2–0 | Cowes |
| 4 | Altrincham | 3–1 | Glossop |
| 5 | Alvechurch | 2–0 | Halesowen Town |
| 6 | Annfield Plain | 0–1 | Murton Colliery Welfare |
| 7 | Arnold | 1–1 | Matlock Town |
| 8 | Arundel | 0–2 | Newport I O W |
| 9 | Ashby Institute | 0–0 | Frickley Colliery |
| 10 | Ashford Town (Kent) | 4–0 | Eastbourne United |
| 11 | Ashton United | 0–3 | Macclesfield Town |
| 12 | Atherstone Town | 1–0 | Darlaston |
| 13 | Aveley | 2–1 | Harlow Town |
| 14 | Aylesbury United | 3–2 | Hatfield Town |
| 15 | Bacup Borough | 2–3 | Fleetwood |
| 16 | Barking | 0–2 | Egham Town |
| 17 | Barnstaple Town | 2–1 | Minehead |
| 18 | Barrow | 0–4 | Accrington Stanley |
| 19 | Barry Town | 0–3 | Merthyr Tydfil |
| 20 | Barton Town | 0–2 | Bradford Park Avenue |
| 21 | Basingstoke Town | 2–0 | Frome Town |
| 22 | Bath City | 3–0 | Andover |
| 23 | Bedford Town | 2–0 | Cambridge City |
| 24 | Bedworth United | 1–0 | A P Leamington |
| 25 | Belper Town | 0–0 | Eastwood Town |
| 26 | Bexhill Town | 0–2 | Ramsgate |
| 27 | Bexley United | 3–0 | Edmonton & Haringey |
| 28 | Bideford | 4–1 | Penzance |
| 29 | Biggleswade & District | 2–0 | Letchworth Town |
| 30 | Billingham Synthonia | 1–4 | Ashington |
| 31 | Bishop Auckland w/o-scr Gateshead | | |
| 32 | Bletchley Town | 3–0 | Potton United |
| 33 | Bognor Regis Town | 3–0 | Ryde Sports |
| 34 | Boldon Colliery Welfare | 0–1 | Evenwood Town |
| 35 | Boston | 0–2 | Holbeach United |
| 36 | Bridgwater Town | 3–3 | Dorchester Town |
| 37 | Bridlington Town | 5–0 | Rawmarsh Welfare |
| 38 | Bridport | 0–1 | Salisbury |
| 39 | Brierley Hill Alliance | 1–1 | Hednesford Town |
| 40 | Brigg Town | 1–0 | Retford Town |
| 41 | Bromley | 0–1 | Southall |
| 42 | Burscough | 1–1 | Formby |
| 43 | Bury Town | 0–4 | Thetford Town |
| 44 | Buxton | 1–0 | Farsley Celtic |
| 45 | Carshalton Athletic | 0–3 | Horsham |
| 46 | Chatham Town | 3–0 | Molesey |
| 47 | Chatteris Town | 0–4 | Harwich & Parkeston |
| 48 | Chesham United | 1–1 | Wealdstone |
| 49 | Cheshunt | 2–2 | Dagenham |
| 50 | Cinderford Town | 1–1 | Kidderminster Harriers |
| 51 | Clacton Town | 2–1 | Lowestoft Town |
| 52 | Clapton | 0–1 | Kingstonian |
| 53 | Clitheroe | 1–4 | Ormskirk |
| 54 | Congleton Town | 2–0 | Hyde United |
| 55 | Connah's Quay Nomads | 5–1 | Prescot Town |
| 56 | Consett | 2–2 | Durham City |
| 57 | Corby Town | 1–0 | Wellingborough Town |
| 58 | Corinthian Casuals | 0–2 | Epping Town |
| 59 | Crook Town | 1–3 | Horden Colliery Welfare |
| 60 | Dartford | 4–1 | St Albans City |
| 61 | Deal Town | 1–1 | Folkestone |
| 62 | Dorking | 0–2 | Maidenhead United |
| 63 | Dover | 5–0 | Tunbridge Wells |
| 64 | Droylsden | 1–4 | Prestwich Heys |
| 65 | Dudley Town | 1–2 | Tamworth |
| 66 | Dulwich Hamlet | 0–1 | Romford |
| 67 | Eastbourne Town | 3–2 | Peacehaven & Telscombe |
| 68 | Eastwood Hanley | 1–1 | Northwich Victoria |
| 69 | Enderby Town | 2–4 | Worksop Town |
| 70 | Epsom & Ewell | 1–5 | Wimbledon |
| 71 | Erith & Belvedere | 1–6 | Leatherhead |
| 72 | Everwarm | 0–4 | Mangotsfield United |
| 73 | Evesham United | 2–2 | Banbury United |
| 74 | Farnborough Town | 2–2 | Woking |
| 75 | Finchley | 1–0 | Bracknell Town |
| 76 | Gainsborough Trinity | 1–2 | Sutton Town |
| 77 | Goole Town | 2–0 | Winterton Rangers |
| 78 | Gornal Athletic | 0–0 | Lye Town |
| 79 | Gosport Borough | 8–0 | Chichester City |
| 80 | Gravesend & Northfleet | 6–1 | Walthamstow Avenue |
| 81 | Great Harwood | 0–1 | South Liverpool |
| 82 | Hampton | 3–3 | Cray Wanderers |
| 83 | Harrow Borough | 2–1 | Tooting & Mitcham United |
| 84 | Hastings United | 3–5 | Sittingbourne |
| 85 | Haywards Heath | 1–1 | Waterlooville |
| 86 | Hertford Town | 5–1 | Wokingham Town |
| 87 | Highgate United | 1–1 | Worcester City |
| 88 | Hinckley Athletic | 2–4 | Stourbridge |
| 89 | Histon | 1–0 | Bourne Town |
| 90 | Hitchin Town | 1–1 | Stevenage Athletic |
| 91 | Hornchurch | 0–0 | Sutton United |
| 92 | Horwich R M I | 3–1 | Skelmersdale United |
| 93 | Hounslow | 2–0 | Edgware Town |
| 94 | Hungerford Town | 1–1 | Trowbridge Town |
| 95 | Ilkeston Town | 2–2 | Brereton Social |
| 96 | King's Lynn | 1–0 | Sudbury Town |
| 97 | Lewes | 4–1 | Whitstable Town |
| 98 | Leyton | 2–2 | Crawley Town |
| 99 | Leytonstone | 2–0 | Windsor & Eton |
| 100 | Llanelli | 1–0 | Weston Super Mare |
| 101 | Long Eaton United | 1–3 | Bilston |
| 102 | Maidstone United | 4–2 | Canterbury City |
| 103 | March Town United | 2–2 | Great Yarmouth Town |
| 104 | Marine | 0–0 | Blaenau Ffestiniog |
| 105 | Melksham Town | 4–2 | Chippenham Town |
| 106 | Mexborough Town | 3–2 | Bridlington Trinity |
| 107 | Moor Green | 1–1 | Bromsgrove Rovers |
| 108 | Morecambe | 0–0 | Darwen |
| 109 | Mossley | 2–0 | Yorkshire Amateur |
| 110 | Nantwich Town | 5–0 | Ellesmere Port Town |
| 111 | Netherfield | 3–2 | Rossendale United |
| 112 | New Mills | 0–2 | Stalybridge Celtic |
| 113 | Newquay | 1–0 | Wadebridge Town |
| 114 | North Shields | 2–0 | Spennymoor United |
| 115 | Norton Woodseats | 0–4 | Denaby United |
| 116 | Nuneaton Borough | 3–0 | Gresley Rovers |
| 117 | Oxford City | 0–1 | Witney Town |
| 118 | Pagham | 0–0 | Worthing |
| 119 | Penrith | 0–1 | Chorley |
| 120 | Poole Town | 0–3 | Weymouth |
| 121 | Radcliffe Borough | 1–2 | Emley |
| 122 | Redhill | 0–1 | Ilford |
| 123 | Rothwell Town | 1–0 | Vauxhall Motors |
| 124 | Runcorn | 2–0 | Witton Albion |
| 125 | Sandbach Ramblers | 0–4 | Leek Town |
| 126 | Sheppey United | 2–3 | Faversham Town |
| 127 | Shildon | 2–1 | Ferryhill Athletic |
| 128 | Skegness Town | 2–3 | Wisbech Town |
| 129 | Southwick | 0–3 | Littlehampton Town |
| 130 | St Blazey | 1–3 | Falmouth Town |
| 131 | St Neots Town | 3–1 | Irthlingborough Diamonds |
| 132 | Staines Town | 2–0 | Croydon |
| 133 | Stamford | 1–0 | Desborough Town |
| 134 | Stanley United | 1–6 | Willington |
| 135 | Stockton | 2–4 | Tow Law Town |
| 136 | Stonehouse | 1–1 | Gloucester City |
| 137 | Taunton Town | 3–1 | Devizes Town |
| 138 | Tilbury | 0–3 | Wycombe Wanderers |
| 139 | Ton Pentre | 1–2 | Glastonbury |
| 140 | Uxbridge | 1–1 | Fleet Town |
| 141 | Ware | 2–0 | Dunstable Town |
| 142 | West Auckland Town | 1–1 | Whitley Bay |
| 143 | Wingate (Durham) | 2–1 | Whitby Town |
| 144 | Winsford United | 1–2 | Porthmadog |

=== Replays ===
| Tie | Home team | Score | Away team |
|---|---|---|---|
| 7 | Matlock Town | 3–4 | Arnold |
| 9 | Frickley Colliery | 2–1 | Ashby Institute |
| 25 | Eastwood Town | 0–3 | Belper Town |
| 36 | Dorchester Town | 0–1 | Bridgwater Town |
| 39 | Hednesford Town | 2–1 | Brierley Hill Alliance |
| 42 | Formby | 4–1 | Burscough |
| 48 | Wealdstone | 2–4 | Chesham United |
| 49 | Dagenham | 2–2 | Cheshunt |
| 50 | Kidderminster Harriers | 1–3 | Cinderford Town |
| 56 | Durham City | 3–1 | Consett |
| 61 | Folkestone | 6–2 | Deal Town |
| 68 | Northwich Victoria | 4–1 | Eastwood Hanley |
| 73 | Banbury United | 2–0 | Evesham United |
| 74 | Woking | 2–2 | Farnborough Town |
| 78 | Lye Town | 5–0 | Gornal Athletic |
| 82 | Cray Wanderers | 1–3 | Hampton |
| 85 | Waterlooville | 3–1 | Haywards Heath |
| 87 | Worcester City | 1–2 | Highgate United |
| 90 | Stevenage Athletic | 1–1 | Hitchin Town |
| 91 | Sutton United | 2–0 | Hornchurch |
| 94 | Trowbridge Town | 4–2 | Hungerford Town |
| 95 | Brereton Social | 1–1 | Ilkeston Town |
| 98 | Crawley Town | 3–2 | Leyton |
| 103 | Great Yarmouth Town | 2–2 | March Town United |
| 104 | Blaenau Ffestiniog | 0–0 | Marine |
| 107 | Bromsgrove Rovers | 1–0 | Moor Green |
| 108 | Darwen | 3–2 | Morecambe |
| 118 | Worthing | 3–1 | Pagham |
| 136 | Gloucester City | 0–1 | Stonehouse |
| 140 | Fleet Town | 3–1 | Uxbridge |
| 142 | Whitley Bay | 4–1 | West Auckland Town |

=== 2nd replays ===
| Tie | Home team | Score | Away team |
|---|---|---|---|
| 49 | Cheshunt | 0–0 | Dagenham |
| 74 | Farnborough Town | 1–2 | Woking |
| 90 | Hitchin Town | 3–2 | Stevenage Athletic |
| 95 | Ilkeston Town | 1–0 | Brereton Social |
| 103 | March Town United | 0–1 | Great Yarmouth Town |
| 104 | Marine | 1–0 | Blaenau Ffestiniog |

=== 3rd replay ===
| Tie | Home team | Score | Away team |
|---|---|---|---|
| 49 | Dagenham | 2–1 | Cheshunt |

== 2nd qualifying round ==
=== Ties ===
| Tie | Home team | Score | Away team |
|---|---|---|---|
| 1 | Ashington | 2–1 | Murton Colliery Welfare |
| 2 | Bilston | 0–2 | Alfreton Town |
| 3 | Bognor Regis Town | 1–0 | Newport I O W |
| 4 | Bromsgrove Rovers | 1–2 | Alvechurch |
| 5 | Chorley | 0–0 | Fleetwood |
| 6 | Corby Town | 1–0 | Biggleswade & District |
| 7 | Crawley Town | 2–3 | Aveley |
| 8 | Dartford | 1–3 | Kingstonian |
| 9 | Darwen | 0–1 | Formby |
| 10 | Denaby United | 0–3 | Frickley Colliery |
| 11 | Emley | 1–2 | Buxton |
| 12 | Evenwood Town | 2–2 | Tow Law Town |
| 13 | Falmouth Town | 4–1 | Barnstaple Town |
| 14 | Faversham Town | 1–1 | Folkestone |
| 15 | Finchley | 0–1 | Boreham Wood |
| 16 | Fleet Town | 2–4 | Chatham Town |
| 17 | Glastonbury | 0–0 | Merthyr Tydfil |
| 18 | Goole Town | 3–1 | Bridlington Town |
| 19 | Gosport Borough | 1–1 | Alton Town |
| 20 | Gravesend & Northfleet | 2–3 | Maidenhead United |
| 21 | Great Yarmouth Town | 1–2 | Harwich & Parkeston |
| 22 | Hampton | 0–5 | Dagenham |
| 23 | Harrow Borough | 1–0 | Horsham |
| 24 | Hertford Town | 2–0 | Chesham United |
| 25 | Highgate United | 1–0 | Lye Town |
| 26 | Histon | 2–1 | Bedford Town |
| 27 | Horden Colliery Welfare | 3–2 | Wingate (Durham) |
| 28 | Horwich R M I | 2–0 | Congleton Town |
| 29 | Hounslow | 1–2 | Epping Town |
| 30 | Ilford | 1–1 | Leatherhead |
| 31 | Ilkeston Town | 2–0 | Atherstone Town |
| 32 | King's Lynn | 3–1 | Clacton Town |
| 33 | Leek Town | 2–2 | Macclesfield Town |
| 34 | Lewes | 1–1 | Dover |
| 35 | Leytonstone | 3–2 | Sutton United |
| 36 | Littlehampton Town | 2–2 | Eastbourne Town |
| 37 | Llanelli | 1–2 | Mangotsfield United |
| 38 | Maidstone United | 1–1 | Ashford Town (Kent) |
| 39 | Melksham Town | 0–6 | Basingstoke Town |
| 40 | Mexborough Town | 1–1 | Bradford Park Avenue |
| 41 | Mossley | 1–1 | Prestwich Heys |
| 42 | Nantwich Town | 0–3 | Altrincham |
| 43 | Netherfield | 2–1 | Accrington Stanley |
| 44 | Newquay | 1–1 | Bideford |
| 45 | North Shields | 0–0 | Whitley Bay |
| 46 | Nuneaton Borough | 1–0 | Hednesford Town |
| 47 | Porthmadog | 2–0 | Connah's Quay Nomads |
| 48 | Romford | 2–2 | Bexley United |
| 49 | Rothwell Town | 1–7 | Hitchin Town |
| 50 | Runcorn | 0–0 | Marine |
| 51 | Shildon | 1–3 | Bishop Auckland |
| 52 | Sittingbourne | 1–1 | Ramsgate |
| 53 | South Liverpool | 0–1 | Ormskirk |
| 54 | St Neots Town | 0–3 | Bletchley Town |
| 55 | Staines Town | 2–0 | Egham Town |
| 56 | Stalybridge Celtic | 3–1 | Northwich Victoria |
| 57 | Stamford | 3–1 | Holbeach United |
| 58 | Stonehouse | 1–2 | Cinderford Town |
| 59 | Stourbridge | 5–2 | Bedworth United |
| 60 | Sutton Town | 1–1 | Brigg Town |
| 61 | Tamworth | 3–0 | Belper Town |
| 62 | Taunton Town | 1–0 | Bridgwater Town |
| 63 | Trowbridge Town | 0–0 | Bath City |
| 64 | Ware | 1–0 | Aylesbury United |
| 65 | Weymouth | 2–0 | Salisbury |
| 66 | Willington | 3–1 | Durham City |
| 67 | Wimbledon | 2–1 | Southall |
| 68 | Wisbech Town | 3–1 | Thetford Town |
| 69 | Witney Town | 1–2 | Banbury United |
| 70 | Worksop Town | 1–0 | Arnold |
| 71 | Worthing | 2–1 | Waterlooville |
| 72 | Wycombe Wanderers | 1–0 | Woking |

=== Replays ===
| Tie | Home team | Score | Away team |
|---|---|---|---|
| 5 | Fleetwood | 1–1 | Chorley |
| 12 | Tow Law Town | 1–0 | Evenwood Town |
| 14 | Folkestone | 4–1 | Faversham Town |
| 17 | Merthyr Tydfil | 3–1 | Glastonbury |
| 19 | Alton Town | 2–1 | Gosport Borough |
| 30 | Leatherhead | 2–0 | Ilford |
| 33 | Macclesfield Town | 4–2 | Leek Town |
| 34 | Dover | 1–2 | Lewes |
| 36 | Eastbourne Town | 0–1 | Littlehampton Town |
| 38 | Ashford Town (Kent) | 0–2 | Maidstone United |
| 40 | Bradford Park Avenue | 4–2 | Mexborough Town |
| 41 | Prestwich Heys | 2–3 | Mossley |
| 44 | Bideford | 6–1 | Newquay |
| 45 | Whitley Bay | 1–1 | North Shields |
| 48 | Bexley United | 3–1 | Romford |
| 50 | Marine | 0–1 | Runcorn |
| 52 | Ramsgate | 2–0 | Sittingbourne |
| 60 | Brigg Town | 0–1 | Sutton Town |
| 63 | Bath City | 2–4 | Trowbridge Town |

=== 2nd replays ===
| Tie | Home team | Score | Away team |
|---|---|---|---|
| 5 | Chorley | 3–2 | Fleetwood |
| 45 | North Shields | 2–2 | Whitley Bay |

=== 3rd replay ===
| Tie | Home team | Score | Away team |
|---|---|---|---|
| 45 | Whitley Bay | 0–3 | North Shields |

== 3rd qualifying round ==
=== Ties ===
| Tie | Home team | Score | Away team |
|---|---|---|---|
| 1 | Alfreton Town | 2–1 | Worksop Town |
| 2 | Alton Town | 1–2 | Bognor Regis Town |
| 3 | Altrincham | 4–0 | Horwich R M I |
| 4 | Alvechurch | 3–2 | Stourbridge |
| 5 | Aveley | 1–0 | Harrow Borough |
| 6 | Basingstoke Town | 0–1 | Trowbridge Town |
| 7 | Bishop Auckland | 3–1 | Tow Law Town |
| 8 | Bletchley Town | 1–1 | Hitchin Town |
| 9 | Boreham Wood | 1–0 | Bexley United |
| 10 | Bradford Park Avenue | 3–3 | Goole Town |
| 11 | Buxton | 2–1 | Mossley |
| 12 | Chatham Town | 0–7 | Wycombe Wanderers |
| 13 | Chorley | 0–1 | Netherfield |
| 14 | Cinderford Town | 2–2 | Banbury United |
| 15 | Dagenham | 3–2 | Kingstonian |
| 16 | Epping Town | 3–0 | Maidenhead United |
| 17 | Falmouth Town | 3–3 | Bideford |
| 18 | Folkestone | 5–1 | Lewes |
| 19 | Formby | 1–0 | Ormskirk |
| 20 | Frickley Colliery | 2–1 | Sutton Town |
| 21 | Harwich & Parkeston | 1–2 | King's Lynn |
| 22 | Histon | 0–2 | Corby Town |
| 23 | Horden Colliery Welfare | 1–1 | Ashington |
| 24 | Ilkeston Town | 2–3 | Tamworth |
| 25 | Leatherhead | 0–0 | Leytonstone |
| 26 | Littlehampton Town | 0–2 | Worthing |
| 27 | Macclesfield Town | 2–1 | Stalybridge Celtic |
| 28 | Maidstone United | 3–1 | Ramsgate |
| 29 | Merthyr Tydfil | 2–0 | Mangotsfield United |
| 30 | Nuneaton Borough | 1–4 | Highgate United |
| 31 | Porthmadog | 0–2 | Runcorn |
| 32 | Staines Town | 1–1 | Wimbledon |
| 33 | Stamford | 4–2 | Wisbech Town |
| 34 | Taunton Town | 1–2 | Weymouth |
| 35 | Ware | 0–0 | Hertford Town |
| 36 | Willington | 3–0 | North Shields |

=== Replays ===
| Tie | Home team | Score | Away team |
|---|---|---|---|
| 8 | Hitchin Town | 2–0 | Bletchley Town |
| 10 | Goole Town | 4–1 | Bradford Park Avenue |
| 14 | Banbury United | 4–1 | Cinderford Town |
| 17 | Bideford | 1–1 | Falmouth Town |
| *23 | Ashington | 2–1 | Horden Colliery Welfare |
| 25 | Leytonstone | 1–0 | Leatherhead |
| 32 | Wimbledon | 4–3 | Staines Town |
| 35 | Hertford Town | 3–1 | Ware |

=== 2nd replay ===
| Tie | Home team | Score | Away team |
|---|---|---|---|
| 17 | Falmouth Town | 2–2 | Bideford |

=== 3rd replay ===
| Tie | Home team | Score | Away team |
|---|---|---|---|
| 17 | Bideford | 2–2 | Falmouth Town |

=== 4th replay ===
| Tie | Home team | Score | Away team |
|---|---|---|---|
| 17 | Falmouth Town | 1–2 | Bideford |

== 4th qualifying round ==
The teams that given byes to this round are Stafford Rangers, Barnet, Hendon, Enfield, Telford United, Hillingdon Borough, Yeovil Town, South Shields, Chelmsford City, Grantham, Margate, Bangor City, Boston United, Rhyl, Guildford City, Blyth Spartans, Kettering Town, Lancaster City, Hayes and Bishop's Stortford.

=== Ties ===
| Tie | Home team | Score | Away team |
|---|---|---|---|
| 1 | Banbury United | 2–0 | Tamworth |
| 2 | Barnet | 2–2 | Hendon |
| 3 | Bideford | 2–2 | Trowbridge Town |
| 4 | Bishop Auckland | 0–1 | South Shields |
| 5 | Bishop's Stortford | 1–1 | Dagenham |
| 6 | Blyth Spartans | 2–0 | Netherfield |
| 7 | Boreham Wood | 2–2 | Aveley |
| 8 | Buxton | 2–2 | Alfreton Town |
| 9 | Corby Town | 1–2 | Boston United |
| 10 | Epping Town | 1–2 | Chelmsford City |
| 11 | Folkestone | 2–3 | Guildford City |
| 12 | Formby | 3–0 | Goole Town |
| 13 | Grantham | 3–1 | Kettering Town |
| 14 | Hayes | 1–1 | Enfield |
| 15 | Hillingdon Borough | 2–1 | Hertford Town |
| 16 | Hitchin Town | 2–1 | Bognor Regis Town |
| 17 | King's Lynn | 3–1 | Stamford |
| 18 | Lancaster City | 1–1 | Altrincham |
| 19 | Leytonstone | 0–0 | Margate |
| 20 | Macclesfield Town | 0–0 | Merthyr Tydfil |
| 21 | Rhyl | 0–4 | Frickley Colliery |
| 22 | Runcorn | 2–2 | Bangor City |
| 23 | Stafford Rangers | 1–1 | Alvechurch |
| 24 | Telford United | 2–0 | Highgate United |
| 25 | Willington | 1–0 | Ashington |
| 26 | Wimbledon | 1–0 | Maidstone United |
| 27 | Worthing | 0–3 | Wycombe Wanderers |
| 28 | Yeovil Town | 1–1 | Weymouth |

=== Replays ===
| Tie | Home team | Score | Away team |
|---|---|---|---|
| 2 | Hendon | 3–0 | Barnet |
| 3 | Trowbridge Town | 1–1 | Bideford |
| 5 | Dagenham | 2–1 | Bishop's Stortford |
| 7 | Aveley | 1–2 | Boreham Wood |
| 8 | Alfreton Town | 2–1 | Buxton |
| 14 | Enfield | 0–1 | Hayes |
| 18 | Altrincham | 1–0 | Lancaster City |
| 19 | Margate | 1–3 | Leytonstone |
| 20 | Merthyr Tydfil | 2–1 | Macclesfield Town |
| 22 | Bangor City | 1–2 | Runcorn |
| 23 | Alvechurch | 2–0 | Stafford Rangers |
| 28 | Weymouth | 2–2 | Yeovil Town |

=== 2nd replays ===
| Tie | Home team | Score | Away team |
|---|---|---|---|
| 3 | Bideford | 1–1 | Trowbridge Town |
| 28 | Yeovil Town | 0–1 | Weymouth |

=== 3rd replay ===
| Tie | Home team | Score | Away team |
|---|---|---|---|
| 3 | Trowbridge Town | 2–3 | Bideford |

== 1973–74 FA Cup ==
See 1973-74 FA Cup for details of the rounds from the first round proper onwards.
