= 1953–54 FA Cup qualifying rounds =

Tournament details
- Country: England; Wales

The FA Cup 1953–54 is the 73rd season of the world's oldest football knockout competition; The Football Association Challenge Cup, or FA Cup for short. The large number of clubs entering the tournament from lower down the English football league system meant that the competition started with a number of preliminary and qualifying rounds. The 30 victorious teams from the fourth round qualifying progressed to the first round proper.

== Preliminary round ==
=== Ties ===
Tie	Home team	Score	Away team
1	Abingdon Town	0–5	Oxford City
2	Ashton United	5–1	Leyland Motors
3	Banbury Spencer	2–1	Wycombe Wanderers
4	Barnet	1–2	Wealdstone
5	Berkhamsted Town	3–3	Hemel Hempstead
6	Betteshanger Colliery Welfare	3–2	Walton & Hersham
7	Bexleyheath & Welling	1–3	Dulwich Hamlet
8	Bicester Town	0–5	Maidenhead United
9	Bootle Athletic	0–2	Pwllheli & District
10	Briggs Sports	4–3	Clacton Town
11	Bristol St George	4–3	Radstock Town
12	Bromley	1–2	Wimbledon
13	Calne & Harris United	0–2	Chippenham Town
14	Canterbury City	0–2	Tunbridge Wells United
15	Chatham Town	1–3	Tooting & Mitcham United
16	Chesham United	3–1	Huntley & Palmers
17	Clandown	1–0	Wells City
18	Clevedon	0–1	Glastonbury
19	Cradley Heath	0–6	Brierley Hill Alliance
20	Dagenham	4–0	Brentwood & Warley
21	Dartmouth United	2–1	St Austell
22	Darwen	2–0	Rossendale United
23	Devizes Town	2–11	Trowbridge Town
24	Dover	1–2	Hounslow Town
25	Dudley Town	1–2	Bilston
26	East Grinstead	4–2	Southwick
27	Edgware Town	0–1	Southall
28	Epsom	1–1	Dorking
29	Halesowen Town	1–2	Stafford Rangers
30	Hanham Athletic	4–1	Paulton Rovers
31	Harrow Town	2–3	Hendon
32	Haywards Heath	3–0	Bexhill Town
33	Holbeach United	0–1	Histon
34	Horsham	3–1	Littlehampton Town
35	Kingstonian	3–1	Woking
36	Lancing Athletic	2–1	Newhaven
37	Leyton	2–1	Tilbury
38	Lockheed Leamington	7–0	Boldmere St Michaels
39	Lovells Athletic	1–3	Cinderford Town
40	Lye Town	3–5	Worcester City
41	Margate	5–1	Gravesend & Northfleet
42	Melksham Town	1–5	Andover
43	Newquay	2–1	Minehead
44	Newton Abbot	1–3	Wadebridge Town
45	Ramsgate Athletic w/o-scr Bowater Lloyds		
46	Redhill	2–0	Bognor Regis Town
47	Rugby Town	5–1	Moor Green
48	Runcorn	3–1	New Brighton
49	Sheppey United	2–2	Maidstone United
50	Shoreham	0–3	Hastings United
51	Sittingbourne	2–1	Carshalton Athletic
52	Slough Centre	4–1	Slough Town
53	Snowdown Colliery Welfare	1–3	Guildford City
54	Spencer Moulton	6–2	Westbury United
55	St Helens Town	2–2	Bangor City
56	St Neots & District	4–1	Huntingdon United
57	Stourbridge	2–0	Oswestry Town
58	Sutton Town (Birmingham)	3–2	Bourneville Athletic
59	Sutton United	3–5	Deal Town
60	Taunton	0–2	St Blazey
61	Tavistock	1–3	Barnstaple Town
62	Tiverton Town	2–3	Ilfracombe Town
63	Uxbridge	2–2	Hayes
64	Windsor & Eton	3–3	Yiewsley
65	Woodford Town	0–3	Chelmsford City
66	Worthing	2–4	Eastbourne

=== Replays ===
Tie	Home team	Score	Away team
5	Hemel Hempstead	4–2	Berkhamsted Town
28	Dorking	0–1	Epsom
49	Maidstone United	3–1	Sheppey United
55	Bangor City	5–1	St Helens Town
63	Hayes	2–3	Uxbridge
64	Yiewsley	2–1	Windsor & Eton

== 1st qualifying round ==
=== Ties ===
Tie	Home team	Score	Away team
1	Alnwick Town	9–0	Shankhouse
2	Alton Town	3–2	Gosport Borough Athletic
3	Amble	3–3	Newburn
4	Ashford Town (Kent)	4–0	East Grinstead
5	Ashington	1–2	West Sleekburn Welfare
6	Aylesbury United	1–2	Headington United
7	Banbury Spencer	2–0	Oxford City
8	Bangor City	1–2	Prescot Cables
9	Barking	1–2	Erith & Belvedere
10	Basford United	0–0	Newhall United
11	Basingstoke Town	0–5	Newport I O W
12	Beccles	7–1	Sheringham
13	Beighton Miners Welfare	5–2	Langold W M C
14	Bestwood Colliery	3–1	Cinderhill Colliery
15	Betteshanger Colliery Welfare	1–0	Tooting & Mitcham United
16	Billingham Synthonia	2–1	Whitby Town
17	Bilston	0–2	Kidderminster Harriers
18	Boldon Colliery Welfare	2–1	Heaton Stannington
19	Bourne Town	1–4	Boston United
20	Bournemouth Gasworks Athletic	8–0	Bridport
21	Bridlington Central United	4–0	South Bank
22	Brigg Town	4–1	Skegness Town
23	Brodsworth Main Colliery	1–4	Worksop Town
24	Brunswick Institute	0–4	Bentley Colliery
25	Brush Sports	2–0	Coalville Town
26	Bungay Town	3–3	Wymondham Town
27	Burscough	4–1	Bacup Borough
28	Burton Albion	2–1	Bedworth Town
29	Chelmsford City	3–2	Romford
30	Chesham United	2–0	Marlow
31	Chippenham United	3–1	Bridgwater Town
32	Clandown	2–4	Glastonbury
33	Congleton Town	5–5	Hyde United
34	Consett	2–2	Easington Colliery Welfare
35	Corby Town	6–2	Spalding United
36	Creswell Colliery	1–0	Ransome & Marles
37	Crook Town	0–1	Stanley United
38	Dagenham	1–3	Briggs Sports
39	Darlaston	0–0	Worcester City
40	Dartmouth United	2–3	Wadebridge Town
41	Dawdon Colliery Welfare	1–4	Annfield Plain
42	Deal Town	0–0	Ramsgate Athletic
43	Denaby United	1–2	Frickley Colliery
44	Dorchester Town	9–0	Lymington
45	Droylsden	2–4	Lytham
46	Earlestown	1–4	Runcorn
47	Eton Manor	4–3	Clapton
48	Ferryhill Athletic	18–0	Skinnigrove Works
49	Fleetwood	3–1	Netherfield
50	Flint Town United	3–2	Ellesmere Port Town
51	Frome Town	2–6	Chippenham Town
52	Gloucester City	6–1	Cinderford Town
53	Goole Town	4–2	Ossett Town
54	Gosforth & Coxlodge	0–5	South Shields
55	Gothic	1–10	Gorleston
56	Grantham	2–2	Ashby Institute
57	Great Harwood	1–4	Lancaster City
58	Gresley Rovers	2–1	Ilkeston Town
59	Guildford City	2–0	Sittingbourne
60	Hanham Athletic	0–2	Bristol St George
61	Hastings United	4–1	Horsham
62	Haywards Heath	1–3	Lancing Athletic
63	Hendon	2–1	Hemel Hempstead
64	Hexham Hearts	3–3	Cramlington Welfare
65	Hinckley Athletic	5–0	Players Athletic
66	Histon	2–5	Cambridge City
67	Hitchin Town	3–3	Letchworth Town
68	Horden Colliery Welfare	1–0	Silksworth Colliery Welfare
69	Horwich R M I	1–1	Darwen
70	Hounslow Town	0–0	Dartford
71	Ilfracombe Town	0–4	Bideford
72	Ilminster Town	3–2	Poole Town
73	Leyton	0–2	Ilford
74	Lowestoft Town	2–1	Bury Town
75	Luton Amateur	1–3	Dunstable Town
76	Lysaghts Sports	2–2	Barton Town
77	Maidstone United	1–3	Margate
78	March Town United	3–1	King's Lynn
79	Marine	1–1	Pwllheli & District
80	Matlock Town	5–0	Boots Athletic
81	Merthyr Tydfil	3–2	Cheltenham Town
82	Metropolitan Police	1–2	Epsom
83	Mossley	3–2	Ashton United
84	Murton Colliery Welfare	2–1	Blackhall Colliery Welfare
85	Northwich Victoria	0–0	Winsford United
86	Nuneaton Borough	1–0	Lockheed Leamington
87	Peasedown Miners Welfare	1–4	Street
88	Penrith	1–6	Morecambe
89	Penzance	0–6	Barnstaple Town
90	Portland United	11–1	Shaftesbury
91	Potton United	1–5	Bedford Town
92	Rawmarsh Welfare	1–1	Norton Woodseats
93	Redhill	0–1	Eastbourne
94	Retford Town	3–4	Upton Colliery
95	Rushden Town	1–1	Kettering Town
96	Salisbury	2–1	Andover
97	Seaham Colliery Welfare	2–2	Chilton Athletic
98	Sheffield	2–2	Stocksbridge Works
99	Shildon	4–0	Tow Law Town
100	Shirebrook Miners Welfare	5–1	Parliament Street Methodists
101	Skelmersdale United	1–1	Chorley
102	Slough Centre	0–1	St Albans City
103	South Kirkby Colliery	1–2	Hallam
104	South Normanton Miners Welfare	1–0	Gedling Colliery
105	Spencer Moulton	3–5	Welton Rovers
106	Spennymoor United	6–0	West Auckland Town
107	St Blazey	4–2	Newquay
108	St Neots & District	0–3	Cambridge United
109	Stafford Rangers	2–3	Bromsgrove Rovers
110	Stalybridge Celtic	1–0	Macclesfield
111	Stamford	5–0	Wellingborough Town
112	Stevenage Town	6–1	Cheshunt
113	Stonehouse	0–6	Barry Town
114	Stourbridge	0–5	Brierley Hill Alliance
115	Stowmarket	2–0	Leiston
116	Sudbury Town	2–1	Diss Town
117	Sutton Town	3–2	Linby Colliery
118	Sutton Town (Birmingham)	1–1	Rugby Town
119	Symingtons Recreation	0–3	Desborough Town
120	Tamworth	0–1	Atherstone Town
121	Troedyrhiw	2–3	Ebbw Vale
122	Tufnell Park Edmonton	2–0	Enfield
123	Tunbridge Wells United	3–1	Dulwich Hamlet
124	Uxbridge	0–1	Yiewsley
125	Vauxhall Motors	6–2	Eynesbury Rovers
126	Warminster Town	2–2	Trowbridge Town
127	Wealdstone	2–1	Southall
128	Willington	2–0	Evenwood Town
129	Wimbledon	1–1	Kingstonian
130	Wisbech Town	6–0	Chatteris Town
131	Witney Town	0–1	Maidenhead United
132	Wolverton Town & B R	0–2	Biggleswade & District

=== Replays ===
Tie	Home team	Score	Away team
3	Newburn w/o-scr Amble		
10	Newhall United	2–3	Basford United
26	Bungay Town	4–1	Wymondham Town
33	Hyde United	0–1	Congleton Town
34	Easington Colliery Welfare	1–3	Consett
39	Worcester City	3–1	Darlaston
42	Ramsgate Athletic	1–0	Deal Town
56	Ashby Institute	2–1	Grantham
64	Cramlington Welfare	2–5	Hexham Hearts
67	Letchworth Town	0–1	Hitchin Town
69	Darwen	3–2	Horwich R M I
70	Dartford	0–3	Hounslow Town
76	Barton Town	1–2	Lysaghts Sports
79	Pwllheli & District	4–0	Marine
85	Winsford United	1–1	Northwich Victoria
92	Norton Woodseats	6–0	Rawmarsh Welfare
95	Kettering Town	3–1	Rushden Town
97	Chilton Athletic	0–2	Seaham Colliery Welfare
98	Stocksbridge Works	0–0	Sheffield
101	Chorley	0–2	Skelmersdale United
118	Rugby Town	4–1	Sutton Town (Birmingham)
126	Trowbridge Town	8–2	Warminster Town
129	Kingstonian	4–2	Wimbledon

=== 2nd replays ===
Tie	Home team	Score	Away team
85	Winsford United	2–0	Northwich Victoria
98	Sheffield	1–1	Stocksbridge Works

=== 3rd replay ===
Tie	Home team	Score	Away team
98	Sheffield	3–1	Stocksbridge Works

== 2nd qualifying round ==
=== Ties ===
Tie	Home team	Score	Away team
1	Altrincham	2–1	Stalybridge Celtic
2	Ashby Institute	4–3	Brigg Town
3	Barnstaple Town	2–2	Wadebridge Town
4	Barry Town	2–1	Gloucester City
5	Basford United	0–5	South Normanton Miners Welfare
6	Beccles	1–5	Gorleston
7	Beighton Miners Welfare	2–1	Norton Woodseats
8	Bentley Colliery	1–2	Worksop Town
9	Bestwood Colliery	0–7	Creswell Colliery
10	Betteshanger Colliery Welfare	1–2	Tunbridge Wells United
11	Bideford	1–3	St Blazey
12	Biggleswade & District	0–0	Bedford Town
13	Billingham Synthonia	4–1	Bridlington Central United
14	Boldon Colliery Welfare	3–3	South Shields
15	Brierley Hill Alliance	2–0	Worcester City
16	Burscough	2–1	Lancaster City
17	Burton Albion	3–0	Atherstone Town
18	Cambridge City	1–3	Cambridge United
19	Chelmsford City	2–1	Erith & Belvedere
20	Chesham United	1–0	Banbury Spencer
21	Chippenham Town	4–2	Salisbury
22	Chippenham United	4–1	Bristol St George
23	Consett	2–3	Annfield Plain
24	Cowes	5–0	Alton Town
25	Cromer	2–0	Bungay Town
26	Desborough Town	0–4	Kettering Town
27	Dorchester Town	1–3	Portland United
28	Dunstable Town	3–2	Vauxhall Motors
29	Eastbourne	2–7	Hastings United
30	Eton Manor	1–1	Hitchin Town
31	Farsley Celtic	0–1	Goole Town
32	Ferryhill Athletic	7–1	Head Wrightsons
33	Fleetwood	1–2	Morecambe
34	Flint Town United	1–3	Runcorn
35	Frickley Colliery	2–1	Sheffield
36	Gresley Rovers	2–0	Matlock Town
37	Hallam	0–5	Upton Colliery
38	Headington United	4–0	Maidenhead United
39	Hendon	2–2	Yiewsley
40	Hexham Hearts	3–2	Alnwick Town
41	Hounslow Town	4–1	Epsom
42	Ilford	1–1	Briggs Sports
43	Ilminster Town	0–4	Bournemouth Gasworks Athletic
44	Kidderminster Harriers	2–1	Bromsgrove Rovers
45	Kingstonian	2–1	Margate
46	Lancing Athletic	1–3	Ashford Town (Kent)
47	Lowestoft Town	3–0	Sudbury Town
48	Lysaghts Sports	0–4	Boston United
49	Lytham	1–2	Skelmersdale United
50	Merthyr Tydfil	3–0	Ebbw Vale
51	Mossley	2–0	Darwen
52	Murton Colliery Welfare	1–1	Ushaw Moor
53	Newport I O W	7–0	Winchester City
54	Prescot Cables	0–1	Pwllheli & District
55	Raleigh Athletic	0–3	Hinckley Athletic
56	Ramsgate Athletic	2–4	Guildford City
57	Rugby Town	1–2	Nuneaton Borough
58	Seaham Colliery Welfare	0–2	Horden Colliery Welfare
59	Spennymoor United	2–1	Stanley United
60	Stamford	3–2	Corby Town
61	Stowmarket	4–1	Whitton United
62	Street	2–1	Glastonbury
63	Sutton Town	1–1	Shirebrook Miners Welfare
64	Tufnell Park Edmonton	2–1	Stevenage Town
65	Wealdstone	2–0	St Albans City
66	Welton Rovers	0–3	Trowbridge Town
67	West Sleekburn Welfare	0–1	Newburn
68	Whitwick Colliery	3–5	Brush Sports
69	Willington	3–0	Shildon
70	Winsford United	1–0	Congleton Town
71	Wisbech Town	4–1	March Town United
72	Yorkshire Amateur	3–3	Selby Town

=== Replays ===
Tie	Home team	Score	Away team
3	Wadebridge Town	3–4	Barnstaple Town
12	Bedford Town	5–0	Biggleswade & District
14	South Shields	9–2	Boldon Colliery Welfare
30	Hitchin Town	7–1	Eton Manor
39	Yiewsley	2–0	Hendon
42	Briggs Sports	5–0	Ilford
52	Ushaw Moor	4–1	Murton Colliery Welfare
63	Shirebrook Miners Welfare	4–3	Sutton Town
72	Selby Town	4–1	Yorkshire Amateur

== 3rd qualifying round ==
=== Ties ===
Tie	Home team	Score	Away team
1	Annfield Plain	0–1	South Shields
2	Ashby Institute	2–3	Boston United
3	Billingham Synthonia	1–2	Ferryhill Athletic
4	Brush Sports	2–1	Hinckley Athletic
5	Burton Albion	1–1	Nuneaton Borough
6	Cambridge United	1–0	Wisbech Town
7	Chelmsford City	1–0	Briggs Sports
8	Chippenham Town	3–2	Trowbridge Town
9	Chippenham United	4–1	Street
10	Creswell Colliery	3–4	Shirebrook Miners Welfare
11	Cromer	2–6	Gorleston
12	Dunstable Town	2–4	Bedford Town
13	Goole Town	1–3	Selby Town
14	Gresley Rovers	5–1	South Normanton Miners Welfare
15	Hastings United	2–1	Ashford Town (Kent)
16	Headington United	2–0	Chesham United
17	Hexham Hearts	5–4	Newburn
18	Hitchin Town	5–1	Tufnell Park Edmonton
19	Horden Colliery Welfare	4–2	Ushaw Moor
20	Hounslow Town	6–1	Kingstonian
21	Kidderminster Harriers	2–0	Brierley Hill Alliance
22	Merthyr Tydfil	3–3	Barry Town
23	Morecambe	0–1	Burscough
24	Newport I O W	4–2	Cowes
25	Portland United	4–1	Bournemouth Gasworks Athletic
26	Pwllheli & District	2–2	Runcorn
27	Skelmersdale United	1–3	Mossley
28	Spennymoor United	2–1	Willington
29	St Blazey	3–5	Barnstaple Town
30	Stamford	3–3	Kettering Town
31	Stowmarket	4–2	Lowestoft Town
32	Tunbridge Wells United	0–2	Guildford City
33	Upton Colliery	2–3	Frickley Colliery
34	Winsford United	3–1	Altrincham
35	Worksop Town	3–2	Beighton Miners Welfare
36	Yiewsley	0–3	Wealdstone

=== Replays ===
Tie	Home team	Score	Away team
5	Nuneaton Borough	3–1	Burton Albion
22	Barry Town	2–3	Merthyr Tydfil
26	Runcorn	3–0	Pwllheli & District
30	Kettering Town	12–0	Stamford

== 4th qualifying round ==
The teams given byes to this round are Bishop Auckland, Yeovil Town, Leytonstone, Gainsborough Trinity, Stockton, Witton Albion, Weymouth, North Shields, Rhyl, Hereford United, Scarborough, Wigan Athletic, Nelson, Tonbridge, Blyth Spartans, Wellington Town, Buxton, Folkestone, Bath City, Llanelli, Peterborough United, Finchley, Great Yarmouth Town and Grays Athletic.

=== Ties ===
Tie	Home team	Score	Away team
1	Bath City	2–1	Barnstaple Town
2	Blyth Spartans	4–2	North Shields
3	Brush Sports	2–2	Hereford United
4	Buxton	0–3	Kettering Town
5	Chelmsford City	0–0	Great Yarmouth Town
6	Chippenham Town	2–4	Weymouth
7	Ferryhill Athletic	2–0	South Shields
8	Folkestone	0–1	Finchley
9	Gorleston	0–2	Bedford Town
10	Guildford City	4–0	Tonbridge
11	Hexham Hearts	2–2	Horden Colliery Welfare
12	Hounslow Town	1–2	Hastings United
13	Kidderminster Harriers	1–2	Wellington Town
14	Leytonstone	0–1	Hitchin Town
15	Llanelli	6–5	Portland United
16	Mossley	1–1	Rhyl
17	Nelson	1–0	Winsford United
18	Newport I O W	3–1	Chippenham United
19	Nuneaton Borough	4–1	Gresley Rovers
20	Peterborough United	4–1	Grays Athletic
21	Scarborough	6–1	Stockton
22	Selby Town	2–0	Frickley Colliery
23	Shirebrook Miners Welfare	2–5	Boston United
24	Spennymoor United	3–1	Bishop Auckland
25	Stowmarket	0–5	Cambridge United
26	Wealdstone	0–3	Headington United
27	Wigan Athletic	2–1	Burscough
28	Witton Albion	2–0	Runcorn
29	Worksop Town	2–2	Gainsborough Trinity
30	Yeovil Town	2–1	Merthyr Tydfil

=== Replays ===
Tie	Home team	Score	Away team
3	Hereford United	3–0	Brush Sports
5	Great Yarmouth Town	1–0	Chelmsford City
11	Horden Colliery Welfare	2–0	Hexham Hearts
16	Rhyl	2–0	Mossley
29	Gainsborough Trinity	2–1	Worksop Town

== 1953–54 FA Cup ==
See 1953–54 FA Cup for details of the rounds from the first round proper onwards.
