= 2005–06 Arsenal L.F.C. season =

Arsenal Ladies
2005–06 season
- Chairman: Peter Hill-Wood
- Manager: Vic Akers
- Stadium: Meadow Park
- Premier League: Champions
- FA Cup: Winners
- Premier League Cup: Runners-up
- UEFA Cup: Quarter finals
- Community Shield: Winners
- London County Cup: Runners-up
- Top goalscorer: League: Kelly Smith (19); All: Kelly Smith (27)
- Biggest win: 9–0 (vs AFC Wimbledon (A), London County Cup, 19 January 2006
- Biggest defeat: 1–3 (vs Frankfurt (A), UEFA Cup, 15 October 2005)
Home colours	Away colours	Third colours

The 2005–06 season was Arsenal Ladies Football Club's 19th season since forming in 1987. The club participated in the National Division of the FA Women's Premier League, winning the title for a 3rd consecutive season. They won the FA Women's Cup by defeating Leeds United 5–0 in the Final, but were unable to retain the Premier League Cup, losing to Charlton Athletic 2–1 in a repeat of the previous season's final. Arsenal also lost to Charlton Athletic in the London County Cup Final as well, but did triumph over them to win the FA Women's Community Shield. In Europe, Arsenal reached the quarterfinals of the UEFA Women's Cup, where they were defeated 4–2 on aggregate by eventual winners Frankfurt.

== Squad information & statistics ==
=== First team squad ===
Squad statistics correct as of May 2006

Squad No.	Name	Date of birth (age)	Since	Signed from
Goalkeepers
1	(Republic of Ireland) Emma Byrne	14 June 1979 (aged 27)	2000	(Denmark) Fortuna Hjørring
13	(Wales) Lauren Wells	3 July 1988 (aged 17)	2004	(England) Arsenal Academy
24	(Jamaica) Becky Spencer	22 February 1991 (aged 15)	2005	(England) Arsenal Academy
Defenders
2	(England) Kirsty Pealling	14 April 1975 (aged 31)	1987	(England) Arsenal Academy
3	(Republic of Ireland) Yvonne Tracy	27 February 1981 (aged 25)	2000	(Republic of Ireland) St Patrick's Athletic
5	(England) Leanne Champ	10 August 1983 (aged 22)	2001	(England) Millwall Lionesses
6	(England) Faye White (c)	2 February 1978 (aged 28)	1996	(England) Three Bridges
12	(England) Alex Scott	14 October 1984 (aged 21)	2005	(England) Birmingham City
15	(England) Cori Daniels	4 June 1986 (aged 20)	2002	(England) Charlton Athletic
17	(England) Hayley Kemp	23 June 1987 (aged 19)	1998	(England) Arsenal Academy
18	(England) Anita Asante	27 April 1985 (aged 21)	1998	(England) Arsenal Academy
23	(England) Mary Phillip	14 March 1977 (aged 29)	2004	(England) Fulham
	(Scotland) Vaila Barsley	15 September 1987 (aged 18)	2005	(England) Arsenal Academy
	(Northern Ireland) Ashley Hutton	2 November 1987 (aged 18)	2004	(England) Arsenal Academy
	(England) Faye Marsh		2005	(England) Arsenal Academy
Midfielders
4	(Wales) Jayne Ludlow	7 January 1979 (aged 27)	2000	(England) Southampton Saints
7	(Republic of Ireland) Ciara Grant	17 May 1978 (aged 28)	1998	(Republic of Ireland) St Patrick's Athletic
8	(England) Kelly Smith	29 October 1978 (aged 27)	2005	(United States) New Jersey Wildcats
11	(England) Rachel McArthur	27 July 1977 (aged 28)	2005	(England) Bristol City
16	(England) Sian Larkin	10 August 1988 (aged 17)	2003	(England) Arsenal Academy
21	(England) Lisa Burrows	1 August 1985 (aged 20)	2002	(England) Arsenal Academy
24	(England) Karen Ray	31 March 1988 (aged 18)	2005	(England) Arsenal Academy
	(England) Charlotte Gurr	16 August 1989 (aged 16)	2004	(England) Arsenal Academy
	(England) Danielle Buet	31 October 1988 (aged 17)	2005	(England) Arsenal Academy
	(England) Danielle Saulter		2004	(England) Arsenal Academy
Forwards
9	(England) Lianne Sanderson	3 February 1988 (aged 18)	2003	(England) Arsenal Academy
10	(Scotland) Julie Fleeting	18 December 1980 (aged 25)	2004	(Scotland) Ross County
14	(England) Rachel Yankey	1 November 1979 (aged 26)	2005	(United States) New Jersey Wildcats
20	(England) Gemma Davison	17 April 1987 (aged 19)	2001	(England) Watford
	(Republic of Ireland) Sarah McGrath	5 October 1987 (aged 18)	2004	(Republic of Ireland) Peamount United
	Beth Lloyd		2005	(England) Arsenal Academy

=== Appearances and goals ===
No.	Name	PLND		FA Cup		PL Cup		LC Cup		Comm Shield		UEFA Cup		Total	
No.	Name	Apps	Goals	Apps	Goals	Apps	Goals	Apps	Goals	Apps	Goals	Apps	Goals	Apps	Goals
Goalkeepers
1	(Republic of Ireland) Emma Byrne	18	0	5	0	5	0	1	0	1	0	5	0	35	0
13	(Wales) Lauren Wells	0	0	0	0	0	0	0	0	0	0	0	0	0	0
24	(Jamaica) Rebecca Spencer	0+1	0	0	0	0	0	2	0	0	0	0	0	2+1	0
Defenders
2	(England) Kirsty Pealling	4+4	0	1+2	0	1+2	0	3	0	1	0	4	0	13+8	0
3	(Republic of Ireland) Yvonne Tracy	13+1	1	4	0	3	0	1	1	1	0	3	0	25+1	2
5	(England) Leanne Champ	10+2	0	4	0	0+1	0	2	0	1	0	0	0	17+3	0
6	(England) Faye White (c)	15	1	3	1	4	0	0	0	1	0	4	0	27	2
12	(England) Alex Scott	8+4	1	2+1	0	3+1	1	1	0	0	0	5	0	19+6	2
15	(England) Cori Daniels	2	0	0+1	0	1	0	2	0	0	0	3+1	0	8+2	0
17	(England) Hayley Kemp	4+1	0	0	0	2	0	1	0	0	0	0	0	7+1	0
18	(England) Anita Asante	14+1	0	5	0	4	1	0	0	1	0	0+1	0	24+2	1
23	(England) Mary Phillip	18	0	5	0	5	0	0	0	1	0	5	0	34	0
	(Scotland) Vaila Barsley	0	0	0	0	0	0	1	0	0	0	0	0	1	0
	(Northern Ireland) Ashley Hutton	0	0	0	0	0	0	0+1	0	0	0	0	0	0+1	0
	(England) Faye Marsh	0	0	0	0	0	0	0+1	0	0	0	0	0	0+1	0
Midfielders
4	(Wales) Jayne Ludlow	14	12	4	1	5	5	3	3	1	2	3+2	2	30+2	25
7	(Republic of Ireland) Ciara Grant	14+1	4	2+3	1	2+2	2	1	3	1	1	6	1	26+6	12
8	(England) Kelly Smith	14+2	19	4	3	5	4	0	0	0	0	5	0	28+2	26
11	(England) Rachel McArthur	10+5	6	1+3	0	2	1	3	3	1	0	5	1	22+8	11
16	(England) Sian Larkin	0+3	0	0+1	0	0+1	0	2	1	0	0	0+2	0	2+7	1
21	(England) Lisa Burrows	0	0	0	0	0	0	0	0	0	0	0	0	0	0
	(England) Charlotte Gurr	0	0	0	0	0	0	2	2	0	0	0	0	2	2
	(England) Danielle Buet	0+1	0	0	0	0	0	0+2	1	0	0	1+1	0	1+4	1
	(England) Danielle Saulter	0	0	0	0	0	0	0	0	0	0	0	0	0	0
	(England) Karen Ray	0	0	0	0	0	0	0+2	1	0	0	0	0	0+2	1
Forwards
9	(England) Lianne Sanderson	17+1	17	5	3	4+1	1	1	1	1	1	5	2	33+2	25
10	(Scotland) Julie Fleeting	8+1	8	5	7	2	2	0	0	0	0	0	0	15+1	17
14	(England) Rachel Yankey	15+1	7	5	3	5	0	0	0	0	0	5	0	30+1	10
20	(England) Gemma Davison	1+6	1	0	0	1+1	0	3	3	0+1	0	0+1	0	5+9	4
	(Republic of Ireland) Sarah McGrath	0	0	0	0	0	0	1	2	0	0	0	0	1	2
	Beth Lloyd	0	0	0	0	0	0	0+2	0	0	0	1	0	1+2	0

=== Goalscorers ===
Rank	No.	Position	Name	PLND	FA Cup	PL Cup	LC Cup	Comm Shield	UEFA Cup	Total
1	8	MF	(England) Kelly Smith	19	3	4	0	0	0	26
2	9	FW	(England) Lianne Sanderson	17	3	1	1	1	2	25
2	4	MF	(Wales) Jayne Ludlow	12	1	5	3	2	2	25
4	10	FW	(Scotland) Julie Fleeting	8	7	2	0	0	0	17
5	7	MF	(Republic of Ireland) Ciara Grant	4	1	2	3	1	1	12
6	11	MF	(England) Rachel McArthur	6	0	1	3	0	1	11
7	14	FW	(England) Rachel Yankey	7	3	0	0	0	0	10
8	20	FW	(England) Gemma Davison	1	0	0	3	0	0	4
9	3	DF	(Republic of Ireland) Yvonne Tracy	1	0	0	1	0	0	2
9	6	DF	(England) Faye White	1	1	0	0	0	0	2
9	12	DF	(England) Alex Scott	1	0	1	0	0	0	2
9		MF	(England) Charlotte Gurr	0	0	0	2	0	0	2
9		FW	(Republic of Ireland) Sarah McGrath	0	0	0	2	0	0	2
14	18	DF	(England) Anita Asante	0	0	1	0	0	0	1
14	16	MF	(England) Sian Larkin	0	0	0	1	0	0	1
14		MF	(England) Danielle Buet	0	0	0	1	0	0	1
14		MF	(England) Karen Ray	0	0	0	1	0	0	1
Own goal				5	1	0	0	0	0	6
Total				82	20	17	21	4	6	150

=== Clean sheets ===
Rank	No.	Name	PLND	FA Cup	PL Cup	LC Cup	Comm Shield	UEFA Cup	Total
1	1	(Republic of Ireland) Emma Byrne	7	2	4	1	1	1	16
2	24	(Jamaica) Rebecca Spencer	0	0	0	0	0	0	0
Total			7	2	4	1	1	1	16

== Transfers, loans and other signings ==
=== Transfers in ===
Announcement date	No.	Position	Player	From club
2005	12	DF	(England) Alex Scott	(England) Birmingham City
2005	11	MF	(England) Rachel McArthur	(England) Bristol City
2005	14	FW	(England) Rachel Yankey	(United States) New Jersey Wildcats

=== Transfers out ===
Announcement date	No.	Position	Player	To club
2005	8	FW	(England) Angela Banks	(England) Whitehawk
2005		FW	(New Zealand) Amber Hearn	(England) Doncaster Rovers Belles
2005		FW	(England) Mikaela Howell	(England) Fulham
2005	14	FW	(England) Justine Lorton	(England) Fulham
2005		MF	(Scotland) Kirsty McBride	(Scotland) Hibernian
2005	22	FW	(England) Dunia Susi	(England) Fulham
2005	16	MF	(England) Emma Thomas	(England) Fulham
2005	11	DF	(England) Clare Wheatley	Retired
2005		MF	Kylie Wren	(England) Watford
2005		GK	(England) Jasmine Cripps	
2005		DF	Yuki Tozaki	
2005			Vikki Keeping	
2005			Lucy Tape	
August 2005		DF	Kelly Lawrence	(England) Fulham

== Club ==
=== Kit ===
Supplier: Nike / Sponsor: O2.

Home	Away	Third

== Competitions ==
=== Overall record ===
Competition	First match	Last match	Starting round	Final position	Record							
Competition	First match	Last match	Starting round	Final position	Pld	W	D	L	GF	GA	GD	Win %
FA Women's Premier League National Division	14 August 2005	16 April 2006	Matchday 1	Winners	18	16	2	0	83	20	+63	88.89
FA Women's Cup	8 January 2006	1 May 2006	Fourth round	Winners	5	5	0	0	8	1	+7	100.00
FA Women's Premier League Cup	2 October 2005	5 March 2006	First round	Runners-up	5	4	0	1	17	1	+16	80.00
UEFA Women's Cup	13 September 2005	15 October 2005	Second qualifying round	Quarter-finals	5	2	1	2	6	6	+0	40.00
FA Women's Community Shield	4 August 2005		Final	Winners	1	1	0	0	4	0	+4	100.00
London County Cup	19 January 2006	22 March 2006	Quarter-finals	Runners-up	3	2	0	1	21	5	+16	66.67
Total					37	30	3	4	139	33	+106	81.08

Last updated: 24 May 2026
Source: FA WPL

=== FA Women's Community Shield ===
4 August 2005	Arsenal	4–0	Charlton Athletic	Milton Keynes
19:45 BST	Grant (penalty missed) 13' 13'; Ludlow 15', 90+3' (yellow card) 81'; Sanderson 60'; McArthur (yellow card) 74'	Report	Chapman (yellow card) 12'; Sinclair-Chambers (yellow card) 33'	Stadium: National Hockey Stadium; Attendance: 2,613; Referee: Amy Rayner

=== FA Women's Premier League National Division ===
==== Partial league table ====
Pos	Team	Pld	W	D	L	GF	GA	GD	Pts	Qualification or relegation
1	Arsenal (C)	18	16	2	0	83	20	+63	50	Qualification for the UEFA Cup qualifying round
2	Everton	18	14	2	2	46	20	+26	44	
3	Charlton Athletic	18	12	3	3	41	13	+28	39	
4	Doncaster Rovers Belles	18	7	2	9	32	34	−2	23	
5	Bristol Academy	18	4	8	6	19	29	−10	20	

Source: FA WPL
(C) Champions

==== Results summary ====
Overall								Home						Away					
Pld	W	D	L	GF	GA	GD	Pts	W	D	L	GF	GA	GD	W	D	L	GF	GA	GD
18	16	2	0	83	20	+63	50	9	0	0	42	7	+35	7	2	0	41	13	+28

==== Results by matchday ====
Matchday	1	2	3	4	5	6	7	8	9	10	11	12	13	14	15	16	17	18
Ground	A	H	A	A	A	A	A	H	H	H	A	A	H	H	H	H	H	A
Result	W	W	W	W	D	D	W	W	W	W	W	W	W	W	W	W	W	W
Position	1	1	1	1	4	4	4	3	2	2	1	1	1	1	1	1	1	1

Source: FA WPL
W = Win; D = Draw; L = Loss

==== Matches ====
14 August 2005 1	Chelsea	0–2	Arsenal	Hampton
14:00 BST		Report	Grant 9' (pen.); Ludlow 43'	Stadium: Beveree Stadium

24 August 2005 2	Arsenal	4–3	Leeds United	Borehamwood
14:00 BST	Sanderson 67', 83'; Davison 73'; McArthur 76'	Report	Clough 3'; White 61' (o.g.); Ward 79'	Stadium: Meadow Park

28 August 2005 3	Bristol Academy	1–5	Arsenal	Mangotsfield
14:00 BST	Williams	Report	Scott; (o.g.); Grant; Smith; McArthur	Stadium: Cossham Street; Attendance: 1

4 September 2005 4	Fulham	1–6	Arsenal	Motspur Park
14:00 BST	Lorton 34'	Report	Yankey 6'; Smith 25', 35'; Sanderson 29'; Wright 65' (o.g.); White 72'	Stadium: Motspur Park

20 October 2005 5	Charlton Athletic	3–3	Arsenal	Gravesend
19:45 BST	Snare 11'; Aluko 13', 74'; Coss (red card) 87'	Report	Smith 47', 85' (pen.), 90+11'; Yankey (yellow card)	Stadium: Stonebridge Road

30 October 2005 6	Everton	3–3	Arsenal	Crosby
12:30 BST	Unitt 47'; Williams 49'; Handley 81'	Report	Yankey 12'; Smith 40', 58'	Stadium: Rossett Park; Attendance: 1,500

13 November 2005 7	Birmingham City	0–7	Arsenal	Redditch
14:00 GMT		Report	Grant; Sanderson 56'; Smith; Ludlow; (o.g.)	Stadium: Valley Stadium

27 November 2005 8	Arsenal	4–0	Doncaster Rovers Belles	Borehamwood
14:00 GMT	Fleeting 33', 42'; Yankey 65'; Grant 75'	Report		Stadium: Meadow Park

4 December 2005 9	Arsenal	6–0	Chelsea	Borehamwood
14:00 GMT	Smith; Fleeting; McArthur; De la Salle 50' (o.g.); Sanderson 82'	Report		Stadium: Meadow Park

18 December 2005 10	Arsenal	5–1	Bristol Academy	Borehamwood
14:00 GMT	Fleeting 48', 50'; Ludlow 68'; Smith 82'; Sanderson 85'	Report	Curtis 53'	Stadium: Meadow Park

22 January 2006 11	Leeds United	1–4	Arsenal	Garforth
14:00 GMT	Preston 18'	Report	Sanderson 36', 90'; Yankey 44'; Smith 72'	Stadium: Wheatley Park

5 February 2006 12	Sunderland	1–6	Arsenal	Washington
14:00 GMT	Lanaghan 50'	Report	Fleeting 17'; Reay 46' (o.g.); McArthur 49', 54'; Grant 59'; Sanderson 69'	Stadium: Victoria Park

26 February 2006 13	Arsenal	5–1	Fulham	Borehamwood
14:00 GMT	Ludlow 25', 34', 83'; Sanderson 83'; Yankey 90'	Report	Thomas 27'	Stadium: Meadow Park

30 March 2006 14	Arsenal	4–2	Birmingham City	Borehamwood
19:45 GMT	Sanderson 8', 10'; Fleeting 30'; Tracy 32'	Report	Scott 23' (o.g.); Lacey 44'	Stadium: Meadow Park; Referee: Mr. T Brooks

2 April 2006 15	Arsenal	7–0	Sunderland	Borehamwood
14:00 BST	Ludlow 35', 46', 52', 74'; Smith 78', 87'; Yankey 83'	Report		Stadium: Meadow Park

9 April 2005 16	Arsenal	5–0	Everton	Borehamwood
12:00 BST	Sanderson 49', 90'; Ludlow 59', 67'; Smith 63'	Report	Williams (yellow card) (yellow-red card) 50'	Stadium: Meadow Park

13 April 2006 17	Arsenal	2–0	Charlton Athletic	Borehamwood
19:45 BST	Smith 21'; Yankey 87'	Report	Stoney (penalty missed) 78	Stadium: Meadow Park; Referee: Mr C Henry

16 April 2006 18	Doncaster Rovers Belles	3–5	Arsenal	Doncaster
14:30 BST	Durrant 2'; Heckley 77'; Exley 86'	Report	Sanderson 47'; Fleeting 56'; McArthur 69'; Yankey 79'; Smith 83'	Stadium: Cantley Park Training Ground

=== FA Women's Cup ===
8 January 2006 Fourth round	Cardiff City	1–4	Arsenal	Cardiff
14:00 GMT	Dykes 23'	Report	Fleeting 10'; White 65'; Yankey 70'	Stadium: Cardiff Athletics Stadium

29 January 2006 Fifth round	Aston Villa	0–3	Arsenal	Sutton Coldfield
14:00 GMT		Report	Fleeting 62'; Sanderson 75' (pen.) (penalty missed) 80; Grant 90'	Stadium: Central Ground Coles Lane; Attendance: 50

19 February 2006 Quarter-finals	Chelsea	1–6	Arsenal	Hampton
14:00 GMT	Perry 41'	Report	Yankey 5'; Sanderson 31'; Smith 40', 60'; Fleeting 78', 79'	Stadium: Beveree Stadium

19 March 2006 Semi-finals	Arsenal	2–1 (a.e.t.)	Charlton Athletic	Bishop's Stortford
15:00 GMT	White (yellow card) 37'; Fleeting 70'; Ludlow 120+2'	Report	Aluko 74'; Pond (yellow card)	Stadium: Woodside Park; Attendance: 1,095; Referee: Ian Crouch

1 May 2006 Final	Arsenal	5–0	Leeds United	Bermondsey
13:00 BST	Ward 3' (o.g.); Fleeting 34'; Yankey 35'; Smith 73' (pen.); Sanderson 77'	Report	Haigh (yellow card) 26'; Emmanuel (yellow card) 65'	Stadium: The Den; Attendance: 13,452; Referee: Phil Crossley (Kent)

=== FA Women's Premier League Cup ===
2 October 2005 First round	Arsenal	5–0	Wolverhampton Wanderers	Borehamwood
14:00 BST	Scott 10'; Smith 25', 43'; Ludlow 45'; Grant 65'	Report		Stadium: Meadow Park

23 October 2005 Second round	Manchester City	0–4	Arsenal
14:00 BST		Report	Ludlow 15'; McArthur 22'; Smith (pen.)

6 November 2005 Quarter-finals	Arsenal	5–0	Bristol City	Borehamwood
15:00 GMT	Ludlow 44'; Smith 60' (pen.); Sanderson 70'; Asante 72'; Grant 89'	Report		Stadium: Meadow Park

11 December 2005 Semi-finals	Everton	0–2	Arsenal	Crosby
		Report	Ludlow 40'; Fleeting 82'	Stadium: Rossett Park

5 March 2006 Final	Arsenal	1–2	Charlton Athletic	High Wycombe
15:00 GMT	Fleeting 75'	Report	Aluko 28', 45+1'; Pond (yellow card) 67'; Stoney (yellow card) 81'	Stadium: Adams Park; Attendance: 3,506; Referee: Paul Forrester

=== London County Cup ===
19 January 2006 Quarter-finals	AFC Wimbledon	0–9	Arsenal
		Report	McArthur; McGrath; Larkin; Ludlow; Tracy; Grant

22 February 2006 Semi-finals	Arsenal	9–1	Addeyan Long Lane	Potters Bar
	Grant; Gurr; Davison; Buet; Ludlow; Ray	Report	Goal	Stadium: The Lantern Stadium

22 March 2006 Final	Arsenal	3–4	Charlton Athletic	East Molesey
19:30 GMT	Davison 10'; Ludlow 19'; Sanderson 80'	Report	Snare 31' (pen.), 70', 76'; Ritchie 67'	Stadium: Imber Court; Referee: Claire Dixon

=== UEFA Women's Cup ===
==== Second qualifying round ====
Pos	Team	Pld	W	D	L	GF	GA	GD	Pts	Qualification	BRØ	ARS	LTO	WRO
1	(Denmark) Brøndby (H)	3	3	0	0	6	1	+5	9	Advance to quarter-finals	—	1–0	2–0	–
2	(England) Arsenal	3	2	0	1	4	2	+2	6	Advance to quarter-finals	–	—	1–0	3–1
3	(Russia) Togliatti	3	0	1	2	3	6	−3	1		–	–	—	3–3
4	(Poland) AZS Wrocław	3	0	1	2	5	9	−4	1		1–3	–	–	—

Source: RSSSF
(H) Hosts

13 September 2005 1	Arsenal (England)	3–1	(Poland) AZS Wrocław	Brøndbyvester
13:00 BST	Sanderson 17'; McArthur 23'; Ludlow 75'	Report	Otrębska 84'	Stadium: Brøndby Idrætsanlæg

15 September 2005 2	Arsenal (England)	1–0	(Russia) Togliatti	Brøndbyvester
13:00 BST	Smith (yellow card) 13' (yellow-red card) 31'; Ludlow 77'	Report		Stadium: Brøndby Idrætsanlæg

17 September 2005 3	Brøndby (Denmark)	1–0	(England) Arsenal	Brøndbyvester
	Jensen 65'	Report		Stadium: Brøndby Stadium

==== Knockout phase ====
===== Quarter-finals =====
8 October 2005 First leg	Arsenal (England)	1–1	(Germany) Frankfurt	Barnet
14:00 BST	White (yellow card) 38'; Sanderson 45+1'; Yankey (yellow card) 59'; Smith (yellow card) 75'	Report	Smisek 23'; Kliehm (yellow card) 31'	Stadium: Underhill

15 October 2005 Second leg	Frankfurt (Germany)	3–1 (4–2 agg.)	(England) Arsenal	Frankfurt
14:00 BST	Lingor 20' (pen.); Garefrekes 43'; Smisek 54'	Report	Grant 11' (penalty missed) 90'; Daniels (yellow card) 90+4'	Stadium: Stadion am Brentanobad

== See also ==
- List of Arsenal W.F.C. seasons
- 2005–06 in English football
