= 2005–06 in English football =

Football in England
- Season: 2005–06

Men's football
- FA Premier League: Chelsea
- Championship: Reading
- League One: Southend United
- League Two: Carlisle United
- Conference National: Accrington Stanley
- FA Cup: Liverpool
- League Cup: Manchester United
- Community Shield: Chelsea

Women's football
- Premier League National Division: Arsenal
- Premier League Northern Division: Blackburn Rovers
- Premier League Southern Division: Cardiff City
- FA Women's Cup: Arsenal
- Premier League Cup: Charlton Athletic

The 2005–06 season was the 126th season of competitive association football in England.

== Overview ==
- Chelsea land their second Premier League title in as many seasons. They headed the table virtually all season long and amassed 91 points in retaining the trophy.
- The rebuilt Wembley Stadium was due to open in time for the FA Cup final in May. However, in August 2005, The Football Association reserved the Millennium Stadium as a backup, as there was some doubt whether Wembley would be ready. The doubts were confirmed on 21 February 2006, when The FA announced that the final would indeed be held at Millennium Stadium. On 31 March 2006 The FA confirmed that the new Wembley would not be opened until 2007.
- Two clubs opened new stadiums at the beginning of this season:
  - Coventry City – Ricoh Arena.
  - Swansea City – Liberty Stadium.
- F.C. United of Manchester, formed by disgruntled Manchester United fans, played their first competitive season, competing in the North West Counties Football League Division Two (level 10 of the English football league system), from which they gained promotion at the first time of asking.
- Reading broke the previous points record of 105 points, taking 106 points from 46 games, scoring 99 goals to earn promotion to the Premier League.
- Wigan Athletic, who earned promotion to the Premier League by finishing second in the Football League Championship, played their first ever season in the top division of English football and comfortably stayed up, staying clear from the threat of relegation all season.
  - Wigan were the first club to play an inaugural season in the top tier of English football since Barnsley in 1997–98, and the first to avoid relegation in an inaugural top tier season since Millwall in 1988–89.

== Diary of the season ==
- 29 June 2005 — Chelsea sell Mateja Kezman to Atlético Madrid for £5.3 million.
- 1 July 2005 — Tottenham Hotspur sign 18-year-old Leeds United winger Aaron Lennon for £1 million.
- 4 July 2005 — Liverpool sign goalkeeper Pepe Reina from Villarreal for £6 million and Mark González from Albacete for £4.5 million.
- 5 July 2005 — Park Ji-Sung becomes Manchester United's first Asian player in a £4 million move from PSV Eindhoven.
- 8 July 2005 — Blackburn Rovers sign Craig Bellamy from Newcastle United for £5 million.
- 12 July 2005 — Arsenal sign Stuttgart and Belarus midfielder Alexander Hleb for £11.2 million.
- 15 July 2005 — Patrick Vieira ends nine years at Arsenal in a £13.7 million move to Juventus.
- 18 July 2005 — Chelsea sign Shaun Wright-Phillips from Manchester City for £21 million.
- 20 July 2005 — Liverpool sign Peter Crouch from Southampton for £7 million.
- 27 July 2005 — Manchester City sign Darius Vassell from Aston Villa for £2 million.
- 4 August 2005 — Phil Neville, who has spent his entire 12-year career at Manchester United, is sold to Everton for £3.5 million.
- 7 August 2005 — Chelsea claim the first silverware of the season when they beat Arsenal 2–1 at the Millennium Stadium in Cardiff to win the FA Community Shield.
- 8 August 2005 — Manchester United misfit Kléberson is sold to Beşiktaş of Turkey for £2.5 million.
- 17 August 2005 — Liberty Stadium hosts its first game; a friendly between Wales and Slovenia. It is the new stadium of Swansea City (replacing 93-year-old Vetch Field), as well as the Ospreys rugby union team.
- 18 August 2005 — Tottenham Hotspur sell Frédéric Kanouté to Sevilla for £4.4 million.
- 19 August 2005 — Chelsea pay a club record £24.4 million to Lyon for Ghanaian midfielder Michael Essien.
- 20 August 2005 — Coventry City take on Queens Park Rangers in their first game at the new 32,500-seat Ricoh Arena.
- 23 August 2005 — Tiago Mendes leaves Chelsea for Lyon in a £6.5 million deal, while Milan Baroš moves from Liverpool to Aston Villa for the same fee.
- 26 August 2005 — Liverpool win the UEFA Super Cup beating CSKA Moscow 3–1.
- 31 August 2005 — August draws to a close with Chelsea looking well placed to defend their Premier League title having won their first four games of the season. Stuart Pearce's Manchester City have made an impressive start to the season as they occupy second place. Charlton Athletic, Manchester United and Bolton Wanderers complete the top five. Newly promoted Sunderland are bottom after losing their first four games of the league season, with Newcastle United and Portsmouth completing the bottom three. Newcastle United break their club transfer record by paying £17 million to Real Madrid for Michael Owen. In the Championship, Sheffield United lead the table with Reading in second place, ahead of newly promoted Luton Town on goal difference. Watford, Southampton and Wolves complete the playoff places. Norwich City, narrowly relegated from the Premier League the previous season, have made a poor start to a campaign thought by many to be a challenge for an immediate return to England's elite and stand one place off the bottom of the Championship, sandwiched by Millwall (bottom) and Sheffield Wednesday.
- 7 September 2005 — Northern Ireland take a historic 1–0 win over England at Windsor Park, Belfast, strengthening calls for Sven-Göran Eriksson's resignation.
- 30 September 2005 — Chelsea's 100% start to the season continues after seven games as they finish September with their Premier League leadership intact. Charlton Athletic are their nearest challengers in second place, with Bolton Wanderers, West Ham United (newly promoted) and Manchester United completing the top five. Sunderland remain bottom with just one point so far this season, while Everton and West Bromwich Albion complete the bottom three. In the Championship, Sheffield United hold a six-point advantage over Reading. Luton, Wolves, Watford and Leeds make up the rest of the top six. Sheffield Wednesday, Plymouth Argyle and Crewe Alexandra prop up the table.
- 8 October 2005 — England defeat Austria 1–0 at Old Trafford, with the Netherlands defeating the Czech Republic the same night, thus assuring England automatic qualification for the 2006 FIFA World Cup, either as the top team in their qualifying group or one of the top two second-placed European teams.
- 12 October 2005 — England defeat Poland 2–1 at Old Trafford to finish top of their World Cup qualifying group.
- 17 October 2005 — Middlesbrough defender Abel Xavier is banned from all football after failing a drugs test.
- 27 October 2005 — England legend Paul Gascoigne, 38, is named manager of Conference North club Kettering Town.
- 28 October 2005 — Deputy Prime Minister John Prescott gives final approval for Brighton & Hove Albion to build Falmer Stadium, now scheduled to open in 2008.
- 29 October 2005 — Manchester United become the first team to score 1,000 Premier League goals, in its 14th season.
- 31 October 2005 — October draws to a close with Chelsea now runaway leaders with 10 wins and a draw from their first 11 games, while their nearest challengers are Wigan Athletic, playing their first top-division season and only their 28th as a professional league club. Tottenham Hotspur, Bolton Wanderers and Charlton Athletic complete the top five, while a disappointing Manchester United and Arsenal are sixth and seventh respectively. Sunderland have at last recorded their first league win of the season but still occupy bottom place, with Birmingham City and Everton completing the bottom three. In the Championship, Reading have closed the gap between them and Sheffield United to three points, with Luton, Watford, Leeds and Crystal Palace completing the top six and Brighton, Crewe and Millwall in the relegation zone.
- 6 November 2005 — Manchester United become the first team to beat Chelsea in 41 Premier League games, with a Darren Fletcher header securing a 1–0 victory at Old Trafford.
- 18 November 2005 — Roy Keane leaves Manchester United by mutual consent, ending his 12-year association with the club.
- 24 November 2005 — Alain Perrin is sacked as manager of Portsmouth after eight months in charge.
- 30 November 2005 — November ends with Chelsea still top of the Premier League, their nearest contenders now being Manchester United who are 10 points behind and with a game in hand. Arsenal, Wigan Athletic and Tottenham Hotspur complete the top five. Sunderland remain bottom with a mere five points and one win so far, with Birmingham City and Portsmouth completing the bottom three. In the Championship, Reading have overtaken Sheffield United with a four-point advantage. Watford, Leeds, Luton and Cardiff complete the top six, while Crewe, Brighton and Millwall remain in the relegation zone.
- 3 December 2005 — Harry Redknapp walks out of Southampton after being refused permission to discuss terms with Portsmouth over returning as manager.
- 5 December 2005 — Paul Gascoigne resigns after just over a month in charge of Kettering Town, during which time they won two, lost two and drew two of their six games.
- 7 December 2005 — Harry Redknapp is appointed manager of Portsmouth for the second time under contract until the end of the season.
- 22 December 2005 — George Burley is appointed Harry Redknapp's replacement at Southampton.
- 31 December 2005 — Chelsea's Premier League continues into 2006 by 11 points over Manchester United, while Liverpool's good run of form has taken them into third place. Tottenham Hotspur and Wigan Athletic complete the top five. Sunderland, Birmingham City and Portsmouth occupy the relegation places. Reading still lead the Championship, with Sheffield United, Leeds, Watford, Crystal Palace and Wolves completing the top six. Sheffield Wednesday, Millwall and Crewe finish the year in the relegation zone.
- 4 January 2006 — Alexandre Gaydamak takes a 50% stake in Portsmouth alongside Milan Mandarić. Manchester United pay Spartak Moscow £7 million for Serbian defender Nemanja Vidić.
- 6 January 2006 — Portsmouth sign Benjani from Auxerre for £4.1 million.
- 8 January 2006 — Burton Albion of the Conference National hold Manchester United to a 0–0 draw in the FA Cup third round, earning a lucrative replay at Old Trafford on 18 January 2006 which they lose 5–0.
- 10 January 2006 — Manchester United sign French defender Patrice Evra from AS Monaco for £5.5 million.
- 12 January 2006 — Liverpool sign Daniel Agger from Brøndby for £5.8 million.
- 13 January 2006 — Arsenal sign Emmanuel Adebayor from AS Monaco for £7 million.
- 20 January 2006 — The Premier League formally charges Portsmouth with "tapping up" Harry Redknapp. Arsenal pay £5 million to Southampton for striker Theo Walcott, who turns 17 on 16 March.
- 22 January 2006 — West Ham United pay £7.25 million for Norwich City striker Dean Ashton.
- 23 January 2006 — The FA announces that Sven-Göran Eriksson will leave his post as England national coach after the 2006 FIFA World Cup.
- 25 January 2006 — Craig Levein is sacked as manager of Leicester City.
- 30 January 2006 — Phil Brown is sacked as manager of Derby County. Academy boss Terry Westley is appointed interim manager, with player Paul Peschisolido acting as his assistant. Manchester City sign Greek midfielder Georgios Samaras from Heerenveen for £6 million.
- 31 January 2006 — Chelsea now lead the Premier League by 14 points ahead of Manchester United and 18 points ahead of Liverpool, with Tottenham Hotspur and Arsenal completing the top five. Sunderland, Portsmouth and Birmingham City occupy the three relegation places. Reading lead the Championship by ten points and look almost certain to gain promotion to the top flight for the first time in their history, while Sheffield United (with a game in hand) are eleven points clear of Leeds and Watford in joint third place. Preston North End and Cardiff City complete the top six. Brighton, Millwall and Crewe prop up the table.
- 2 February 2006 — Graeme Souness is sacked as manager of Newcastle United, and Glenn Roeder was made caretaker manager with Alan Shearer his assistant manager.
- 4 February 2006 — Alan Shearer becomes Newcastle United's top goalscorer of all time, scoring his 201st goal for the club, against Portsmouth at St. James' Park, beating Jackie Milburn's 200 goal tally which had stood for 49 years.
- 11 February 2006 — Middlesbrough comfortably defeat reigning Premier League champions Chelsea 3–0 at the Riverside Stadium, the first time José Mourinho's Chelsea have lost by more than a single goal.
- 18 February 2006 — Liverpool beat Manchester United in the FA Cup for the first time since 1921. The draw was a 5th round matchup.
- 21 February 2006 — The FA announce that the 2006 FA Cup Final, set for 13 May, will be held at the Millennium Stadium, as the builders of the new Wembley Stadium are unable to guarantee that it will be ready for the match. They also announce that the national team's pre-World Cup friendlies originally scheduled for Wembley will instead be held at Old Trafford.
- 21 February 2006 — A Football League under-21 team, composed of players from the Football League's three divisions, beats a Lega Nazionale Professionisti under-21 team, composed of players from Serie B, 1–0 at the KC Stadium.
- 26 February 2006 — Manchester United defeat Wigan Athletic 4–0 at the Millennium Stadium to win the Carling Cup. Should they finish in the top five this season, there will be a UEFA Cup place for the league's sixth highest placed team.
- 28 February 2006 — The month ends with Chelsea's lead over Manchester United at the top of the Premier League narrowed slightly to 12 points. Liverpool, Tottenham Hotspur and Arsenal once again complete the top five, while Bolton Wanderers occupy the now sought-after sixth place. Sunderland continue to prop up the top flight, having gained just nine points so far this season. Portsmouth and Birmingham City complete the bottom three, with Portsmouth now eight points adrift of safety. The top six remain unchanged from the previous month, although Watford have moved to third and Crystal Palace to fifth. Millwall has changed places in the relegation zone with Brighton, whom they lead on goal difference, while Crewe prop up the table.
- 6 March 2006 — Mick McCarthy is sacked as manager of Sunderland after his team accumulated just 10 points in 28 matches, with Kevin Ball made caretaker manager for the remainder of the season.
- 25 March 2006 — Reading became the first side to be promoted to the 2006–07 Premier League after drawing 1–1 at Leicester City. 2006–07 will be the Berkshire club's first ever season in England's top flight (though they would have been automatically promoted in 1995 as Division One runners-up had it not been for a reorganisation of the league which saw them forced into the playoffs where they had lost to Bolton Wanderers in the final).
- 31 March 2006 — March draws to a close with Chelsea now nine points ahead of Manchester United at the top of the Premier League. Liverpool, Tottenham, Blackburn Rovers and Arsenal complete the top six, while Wigan Athletic are now eighth and their dreams of European football are fading fast. Sunderland are still bottom with 10 points though their relegation has yet to be confirmed. Portsmouth and Birmingham City complete the bottom three, both of them being three points behind 17th-placed West Bromwich Albion and with a game in hand. Reading need only one more win from their last six games to confirm the Championship title, while Sheffield United appear almost certain to join Reading in the top flight. Watford, Leeds, Crystal Palace and Preston North End complete the top six. At the other end of the table, Crewe and Brighton look dead and buried, needing four wins each from their last six games and other results to go their way to avoid relegation. Millwall are only five points adrift in the relegation zone but still look bound for relegation as well, just two seasons after competing in the UEFA Cup.
- 1 April 2006 — Reading win the Football League Championship title. A 5-0 victory over Derby County with Sheffield United only drawing mean that Reading cannot be overtaken.
- 14 April 2006 — Sunderland are relegated from the Premier League after a 0–0 draw with Manchester United at Old Trafford. This is the first relegation in the league.
- 15 April 2006 — Sheffield United become the second side to secure promotion to the Premier League after they beat Cardiff City while Watford and Leeds United only draw with Wolverhampton Wanderers and champions Reading respectively.
- 15 April 2006 — Accrington Stanley regain their Football League status 44 years after the previous club of the same name lost it due to bankruptcy, after they beat Woking to win the Conference National title.
- 17 April 2006 — Sheffield Wednesday's 2–0 win at Brighton & Hove Albion ensures that the trio of Brighton, Crewe Alexandra and Millwall are all relegated from the Championship.
- 17 April 2006 — Alan Shearer plays his last competitive match against, rather fittingly, Sunderland, after a Julio Arca tackle tore his medial collateral ligament.
- 18 April 2006 — John Lyall, former Ipswich Town and West Ham United manager, dies of a heart attack aged 66.
- 20 April 2006 — Altrincham of the Conference National have 18 points deducted for fielding an ineligible player 13 times. This points deduction relegates the club to the Conference North.
- 22 April 2006 — Carlisle United secure promotion to League One after a 1–1 draw at Mansfield Town while Leyton Orient were also held to a draw by the same scoreline at Lincoln City. This promotion comes just one season after Carlisle returned to the Football League following a one-season exile.
- 22 April 2006 — Walsall are relegated to League Two after losing 3–1 at home to Huddersfield Town and Rotherham United draw with Scunthorpe United.
- 29 April 2006 — Chelsea successfully retain their Premier League title after beating Manchester United 3–0. On the same occasion, Portsmouth win 2 - 1 at Wigan to confirm their safety and relegated both West Brom and Birmingham, who can only hold on to a goalless draw against Newcastle.
- 29 April 2006 — Charlton Athletic manager Alan Curbishley announces that he will resign at the end of the season, ending a 15-year-long tenure as manager at The Valley.
- 29 April 2006 — Southend United secure promotion from League One after they draw 2–2 at Swansea City while Brentford also draw against Hartlepool United. Also in League One, Swindon Town are relegated to League Two after they could only draw 1–1 against Bristol City.
- 29 April 2006 — Northampton Town secure promotion from League Two after beating Chester City 1–0. Rushden & Diamonds are relegated to the Conference National when they lose 2–0 away to Boston United and other results go against them.
- 30 April 2006 — Reading break Sunderland's record for most points in any professional English league, beating Queens Park Rangers 2–1 to finish on 106 points.
- 30 April 2006 — April draws to a close with Chelsea confirmed as champions, while Manchester United and Liverpool are the next highest teams level on points. Tottenham Hotspur, Arsenal and Blackburn Rovers complete the top six. Sunderland are bottom and were relegated two weeks ago, while West Bromwich Albion and Birmingham City's relegation has just been confirmed. It is a brilliant time for Portsmouth, who looked dead and buried barely two months ago.
- 4 May 2006 — Current Middlesbrough manager Steve McClaren signs a four-year contract agreeing to succeed Sven-Göran Eriksson as England head coach after the World Cup. The contract begins on 1 August.
- 4 May 2006 — Newcastle United are refused permission to appoint caretaker manager Glenn Roeder on a permanent basis as he does not possess the required coaching qualifications.
- 6 May 2006 — Southend United, after defeating Bristol City, become League One champions, while Colchester United secure the second automatic place to the Championship after managing a draw at Yeovil while Brentford can only draw away at AFC Bournemouth; Colchester will play in the top two tiers in English football for the first time in their history after their promotion. Around the same time, both Hartlepool United and Milton Keynes Dons are relegated to League Two after both teams can only draw while Rotherham United survive.
- 6 May 2006 — Oxford United lose their league status after 44 years and are relegated from the football league following a 3–2 defeat by Leyton Orient, who are promoted to League One after their win while Grimsby Town can only draw against already promoted Northampton Town.
- 7 May 2006 — Sunderland finish the season on 15 points, the lowest points total ever in top-flight English football since 3 points for a win was introduced in the 1981–82 season.
- 9 May 2006 — Roy Keane's testimonial is played at Old Trafford, with Manchester United beating Celtic 1–0 thanks to a second half Cristiano Ronaldo goal.
- 10 May 2006 — Middlesbrough lose the UEFA Cup final 4–0 to Sevilla in Steve McClaren's last game in charge at the Philips Stadion in Eindhoven. On the same day, the Premier League change their mind over the Glenn Roeder situation at Newcastle United and give him permission to take on the manager's role on a permanent basis despite him not having the requiring coaching qualifications.
- 11 May 2006 — Alan Shearer's testimonial is played at St James' Park, with a Newcastle XI beating Celtic 3–2, with Shearer scoring the winning penalty. Joe Royle leaves Ipswich Town "by mutual consent".
- 13 May 2006 — Liverpool win the 125th FA Cup final beating West Ham United 3–1 on penalties after a thrilling 3–3 draw after extra time.
- 16 May 2006 — Lincoln City become the first team to lose four consecutive play-off competitions following a 3–1 aggregate defeat to neighbors Grimsby Town in the League Two semi-finals.
- 17 May 2006 — Arsenal lose in the UEFA Champions League final to Barcelona 2–1 in the Stade de France. Jens Lehmann is sent off controversially after fouling Samuel Eto'o and Ludovic Giuly puts the ball into the back of the net.
- 20 May 2006 — Hereford United gain promotion to League Two after beating Halifax Town 3–2 in the Conference Playoff Final, after extra time.
- 21 May 2006 — Watford gain promotion to the Premier League after defeating Leeds United 3–0 in the Championship play-off final.
- 23 May 2006 — Arsenal sign Tomáš Rosický from Borussia Dortmund for £6.8 million.
- 27 May 2006 — Barnsley win promotion to the Championship after overcoming Swansea City in the League One play-off final. They win 4–3 on penalties after both sides remained level at 2–2 after extra time.
- 28 May 2006 — Cheltenham Town win promotion to the League One by defeating Grimsby Town 1–0 in the League Two play-off final.
- 30 May 2006 — Everton pay a club record £8.6 million for Crystal Palace striker Andrew Johnson, and Chelsea sign Salomon Kalou from Feyenoord for £8 million.
- 31 May 2006 — Chelsea pay a national record £30 million for Milan and Ukraine striker Andriy Shevchenko.
- 2 June 2006 — Billy Davies leaves Preston North End to become manager of Derby County.
- 4 June 2006 — Scarborough are relegated from the Conference National for a breach of league rules. They take Altrincham's relegation place.
- 8 June 2006 — The BBC's Match of the Day will show Premier League highlights for at least another four seasons after £171.6 million bid for television rights was accepted.
- 10 June 2006 — England open their World Cup campaign with a 1–0 win over Paraguay.
- 14 June 2006 — Everton sign defender Joleon Lescott from Wolverhampton Wanderers for £5 million, and Chelsea sell striker Eiður Guðjohnsen to Barcelona for £8 million.
- 15 June 2006 — England beat Trinidad and Tobago 2–0 to confirm their qualification for the last 16 of the World Cup.
- 20 June 2006 — England draw 2–2 with Sweden in their final group game.
- 22 June 2006 — Liverpool pay £6 million to Blackburn Rovers for winger Craig Bellamy.
- 25 June 2006 — England reach the World Cup quarter-finals for the second tournament in succession with a 1–0 win over Ecuador in the second round.
- 1 July 2006 — England lose on penalties to Portugal after a goalless draw in the World Cup quarter-finals. Tottenham Hotspur sign Bulgarian striker Dimitar Berbatov from Bayer Leverkusen for £10.9 million. Former Tottenham Hotspur and England manager Glenn Hoddle resigns at Wolverhampton Wanderers.

== National team ==
England qualified for the 2006 FIFA World Cup, after finishing top of UEFA Qualifying Group 6.

Date	Venue	Opponents	Score	Competition	England scorers	Match Report
17 August 2005	Parken Stadion, Copenhagen (A)	Denmark	1–4	F	Wayne Rooney	BBC
3 September 2005	Millennium Stadium, Cardiff (A)	Wales	1–0	WCQ	Joe Cole	BBC
7 September 2005	Windsor Park, Belfast (A)	Northern Ireland	0–1	WCQ		BBC
8 October 2005	Old Trafford, Manchester (H)	Austria	1–0	WCQ	Frank Lampard (pen)	BBC
12 October 2005	Old Trafford, Manchester (H)	Poland	2–1	WCQ	Michael Owen, Frank Lampard	BBC
12 November 2005	Stade de Genève, Geneva (N)	Argentina	3–2	F	Wayne Rooney, Michael Owen (2)	BBC
1 March 2006	Anfield, Liverpool (H)	Uruguay	2–1	F	Peter Crouch, Joe Cole	BBC
25 May 2006	Madejski Stadium, Reading (H)	Belarus	1–2	F ('B' team)	Jermaine Jenas	BBC
30 May 2006	Old Trafford, Manchester (H)	Hungary	3–1	F	Steven Gerrard, John Terry, Peter Crouch	BBC
3 June 2006	Old Trafford, Manchester (H)	Jamaica	6–0	F	Frank Lampard, Jermaine Taylor (o.g.), Michael Owen, Peter Crouch (3)	BBC
10 June 2006	FIFA WM Stadion Frankfurt, Frankfurt (N)	Paraguay	1–0	WCF	Carlos Gamarra (o.g.)	BBC
15 June 2006	Frankenstadion, Nuremberg (N)	Trinidad and Tobago	2–0	WCF	Peter Crouch, Steven Gerrard	BBC
20 June 2006	FIFA WM Stadion Köln, Cologne (N)	Sweden	2–2	WCF	Joe Cole, Steven Gerrard	BBC
25 June 2006	Gottlieb-Daimler-Stadion, Stuttgart (N)	Ecuador	1–0	WCF	David Beckham	BBC
1 July 2006	Veltins-Arena, Gelsenkirchen (N)	Portugal	0–0 (FT), 0–0 (aet), 1–3 (P)	WCF		BBC

Key

- H = Home match
- A = Away match
- N = Neutral site match
- F = Friendly
- WCQ = FIFA World Cup 2006 Qualifying, European zone Group 6
- WCF = FIFA World Cup 2006 Finals

== Honours ==
Competition	Winner	Details	Match Report
2005 UEFA Super Cup	Liverpool	Beat CSKA Moscow 3–1	UEFA
2005–06 FA Premier League	Chelsea		BBC
2005–06 FA Cup	Liverpool	Beat West Ham United 3–1 on penalties; 3–3 after extra time	BBC
2005–06 Football League Cup	Manchester United	Beat Wigan Athletic 4–0	BBC
2005–06 Football League Championship	Reading	Finished on record 106 points	BBC
2005–06 Football League One	Southend United	Consecutive promotions	BBC
2005–06 Football League Two	Carlisle United	Consecutive promotions	BBC
2005 FA Community Shield	Chelsea	Beat Arsenal 2–1	BBC
2005–06 Football League Trophy	Swansea City	Beat Carlisle United 2–1	BBC

== European qualification ==
Competition	Qualifiers	Reason for Qualification
UEFA Champions League	Chelsea	1st in FA Premier League
UEFA Champions League	Manchester United	2nd in FA Premier League
UEFA Champions League Third Qualifying Round	Liverpool	3rd in FA Premier League
UEFA Champions League Third Qualifying Round	Arsenal	4th in FA Premier League
UEFA Cup	Tottenham Hotspur	5th in FA Premier League
UEFA Cup	West Ham United	In lieu of FA Cup winners (qualification awarded as FA Cup runners-up because FA Cup winners Liverpool had already qualified for the Champions League)
UEFA Cup	Blackburn Rovers	In lieu of League Cup winners (qualification awarded as next-highest (6th) Premier League finishers to have not qualified for Europe because League Cup winners Manchester United had already qualified for the Champions League)
UEFA Intertoto Cup third round	Newcastle United	Highest Premier League finishers (7th) to have entered and not qualified for any other European competition

== League tables ==
=== FA Premier League ===
Chelsea, on 91 points, won their second Premier League title in a row. Manchester United, whose 83-point tally would have been enough for title glory in most seasons, finished runners-up. Liverpool's league form improved drastically following the previous season and they finished in third place, just one point behind United; they also won the FA Cup, giving manager Rafael Benítez his second major trophy in just his second season. Arsenal snatched the last Champions League spot from under the noses of local rivals Tottenham Hotspur, after the latter's players went down with a bout of food poisoning. The Gunners' 4–2 victory over Wigan Athletic on the final day of the season saw them end 92 years of playing at Highbury before they moved into their new 60,000-seat Emirates Stadium.

Ultimately joining Tottenham in the UEFA Cup were Blackburn Rovers and West Ham United who were promoted the previous season and took the European spot by virtue of being FA Cup runners-up. Despite narrowly losing on penalties to Liverpool, the Hammers enjoyed a successful first season back amongst the elite, finishing in a comfortable 9th place.

Fellow newly promoted side Wigan Athletic, who were many pundits' tip for relegation in pre-season, defied the odds to finish 10th in their first season in the top-flight. Everton crashed out of the Champions League early and were in the relegation zone by October, but a good run of results both after Halloween and in the new year saw them comfortably finish in 11th. Middlesbrough finished 14th after a disappointing league season, but reached the UEFA Cup Final – the first European final in their history – where they were beaten 4–0 by Sevilla.

In contrast to the other promoted sides, Sunderland, the previous season's Championship winners, were relegated with a league record low of 15 points, breaking the previous record that they set themselves in 2002–03, while West Bromwich Albion and Birmingham City both hit the 30-point mark and battled bravely, but both were unable to avoid relegation after dismal runs of league form (the Baggies going winless from February onwards, with Birmingham unable to shake off poor away form). Portsmouth spent almost the entire season in the relegation zone, but after the return of Harry Redknapp, they stayed up after a late run of good results.

Pos	Team	Pld	W	D	L	GF	GA	GD	Pts	Qualification or relegation
1	Chelsea (C)	38	29	4	5	72	22	+50	91	Qualification for the Champions League group stage
2	Manchester United	38	25	8	5	72	34	+38	83	Qualification for the Champions League group stage
3	Liverpool	38	25	7	6	57	25	+32	82	Qualification for the Champions League third qualifying round
4	Arsenal	38	20	7	11	68	31	+37	67	Qualification for the Champions League third qualifying round
5	Tottenham Hotspur	38	18	11	9	53	38	+15	65	Qualification for the UEFA Cup first round (Note: Since Manchester United qualified for the Champions League, their place in the UEFA Cup as League Cup winners passed down to the league and was awarded to Blackburn Rovers as the highest-placed team not already qualified for European competitions.)
6	Blackburn Rovers	38	19	6	13	51	42	+9	63	Qualification for the UEFA Cup first round
7	Newcastle United	38	17	7	14	47	42	+5	58	Qualification for the Intertoto Cup third round
8	Bolton Wanderers	38	15	11	12	49	41	+8	56	
9	West Ham United	38	16	7	15	52	55	−3	55	Qualification for the UEFA Cup first round (Note: Since Liverpool had already qualified for the Champions League, their UEFA Cup berth as the FA Cup winners went to West Ham, who were the FA Cup runners-up.)
10	Wigan Athletic	38	15	6	17	45	52	−7	51	
11	Everton	38	14	8	16	34	49	−15	50	
12	Fulham	38	14	6	18	48	58	−10	48	
13	Charlton Athletic	38	13	8	17	41	55	−14	47	
14	Middlesbrough	38	12	9	17	48	58	−10	45	
15	Manchester City	38	13	4	21	43	48	−5	43	
16	Aston Villa	38	10	12	16	42	55	−13	42	
17	Portsmouth	38	10	8	20	37	62	−25	38	
18	Birmingham City (R)	38	8	10	20	28	50	−22	34	Relegation to the Football League Championship
19	West Bromwich Albion (R)	38	7	9	22	31	58	−27	30	Relegation to the Football League Championship
20	Sunderland (R)	38	3	6	29	26	69	−43	15	Relegation to the Football League Championship

Source: Barclays Premier League
Rules for classification: 1) points; 2) goal difference; 3) number of goals scored.
(C) Champions; (R) Relegated
Notes:

Leading goalscorer: Thierry Henry (Arsenal) – 27

=== The Football League ===
==== Football League Championship ====
Reading entered the top flight for the first time in their history, breaking Sunderland's points record of 105 in the process by accumulating 106 points (coincidentally, Sunderland were relegated from the Premier League while breaking the record for lowest number of points under the current scoring system). Sheffield United joined them, returning to the Premier League after twelve years and earning Neil Warnock his fourth promotion as a manager. Surprise package Watford, initially tipped for relegation, entered the play-offs and beat Leeds United 3–0 in the Millennium Stadium final, who were unable to shake off a bad run of form (worse than any of the three relegated sides) that saw them lose out in the race for automatic promotion.

Crystal Palace fared the best out of the teams relegated from the Premier League the previous season, by getting to the play-offs but losing in the semi-finals. Norwich City never managed better than mid-table, while Southampton endured an awful season that saw Sir Clive Woodward take up a much-criticized role as director of football, manager Harry Redknapp return to local rivals Portsmouth and the side looking in danger of relegation for much of the season, only managing a mid-table finish with a late surge in form, thanks to the appointment of George Burley. Chairman Rupert Lowe ultimately paid the price by being forced to resign after the end of the season.

The relegation battle was principally fought by four sides: Crewe, Brighton, Millwall and Sheffield Wednesday. Wednesday ultimately won the battle, and the remaining three were relegated all on the same day, after Wednesday beat Brighton 2–0. Although Crewe and Brighton had not spent long in the division and were considered to be punching above their weight, Millwall underwent a disastrous season, getting through five managers and four chairmen before relegation.

Pos	Team	Pld	W	D	L	GF	GA	GD	Pts	Promotion, qualification or relegation
1	Reading (C, P)	46	31	13	2	99	32	+67	106	Promotion to the FA Premier League
2	Sheffield United (P)	46	26	12	8	76	46	+30	90	Promotion to the FA Premier League
3	Watford (O, P)	46	22	15	9	77	53	+24	81	Qualification for Championship play-offs
4	Preston North End	46	20	20	6	59	30	+29	80	Qualification for Championship play-offs
5	Leeds United	46	21	15	10	57	38	+19	78	Qualification for Championship play-offs
6	Crystal Palace	46	21	12	13	67	48	+19	75	Qualification for Championship play-offs
7	Wolverhampton Wanderers	46	16	19	11	50	42	+8	67	
8	Coventry City	46	16	15	15	62	65	−3	63	
9	Norwich City	46	18	8	20	56	65	−9	62	
10	Luton Town	46	17	10	19	66	67	−1	61	
11	Cardiff City	46	16	12	18	58	59	−1	60	
12	Southampton	46	13	19	14	49	50	−1	58	
13	Stoke City	46	17	7	22	54	63	−9	58	
14	Plymouth Argyle	46	13	17	16	39	46	−7	56	
15	Ipswich Town	46	14	14	18	53	66	−13	56	
16	Leicester City	46	13	15	18	51	59	−8	54	
17	Burnley	46	14	12	20	46	54	−8	54	
18	Hull City	46	12	16	18	49	55	−6	52	
19	Sheffield Wednesday	46	13	13	20	39	52	−13	52	
20	Derby County	46	10	20	16	53	67	−14	50	
21	Queens Park Rangers	46	12	14	20	50	65	−15	50	
22	Crewe Alexandra (R)	46	9	15	22	57	86	−29	42	Relegation to Football League One
23	Millwall (R)	46	8	16	22	35	62	−27	40	Relegation to Football League One
24	Brighton & Hove Albion (R)	46	7	17	22	39	71	−32	38	Relegation to Football League One

Updated to match(es) played on 2 December 2011. Source: RSSSF
Rules for classification: 1) points; 2) goal difference; 3) number of goals scored.
(C) Champions; (O) Play-off winners; (P) Promoted; (R) Relegated

Leading goalscorer: Marlon King (Watford) – 21

==== Football League One ====
Southend United surprised many by winning a second successive promotion, returning to the Championship after nearly a decade (when it was called Division One). Colchester United also made the Championship for the first time in their history, but their promotion was tempered by the loss of manager Phil Parkinson to Hull City. A highly competitive play-off race saw Barnsley emerge as winners, beating Swansea City at the Millennium Stadium 4–3 on penalties after both normal time and extra-time finished 2–2, to return to the Championship after three seasons of struggle in Division Two/League One.

Following relegation and becoming the first former European champions to be subsequently relegated to the third tier of their domestic league, Nottingham Forest struggled for most of the season and were in danger of suffering a second successive relegation. The departure of Gary Megson saw a late upturn in form and surge towards the play-offs; however, they missed out on the last day of the season, finishing 7th.

At the bottom, Walsall endured their second relegation in three seasons, Swindon became the first former Premier League side to slip to the bottom division. Hartlepool crashed out of the division after nearly earning promotion last season, while MK Dons suffered the relegation they only avoided the previous season when Wrexham were docked points for entering administration.

Pos	Team	Pld	W	D	L	GF	GA	GD	Pts	Qualification or relegation
1	Southend United (C, P)	46	23	13	10	72	43	+29	82	Promotion to the Championship
2	Colchester United (P)	46	22	13	11	58	40	+18	79	Promotion to the Championship
3	Brentford	46	20	16	10	72	52	+20	76	Qualification for the League One play-offs
4	Huddersfield Town	46	19	16	11	72	59	+13	73	Qualification for the League One play-offs
5	Barnsley (O, P)	46	18	18	10	62	44	+18	72	Qualification for the League One play-offs
6	Swansea City	46	18	17	11	78	55	+23	71	Qualification for the League One play-offs
7	Nottingham Forest	46	19	12	15	67	52	+15	69	
8	Doncaster Rovers	46	20	9	17	55	51	+4	69	
9	Bristol City	46	18	11	17	66	62	+4	65	
10	Oldham Athletic	46	18	11	17	58	60	−2	65	
11	Bradford City	46	14	19	13	51	49	+2	61	
12	Scunthorpe United	46	15	15	16	68	73	−5	60	
13	Port Vale	46	16	12	18	49	54	−5	60	
14	Gillingham	46	16	12	18	50	64	−14	60	
15	Yeovil Town	46	15	11	20	54	62	−8	56	
16	Chesterfield	46	14	14	18	63	73	−10	56	
17	Bournemouth	46	12	19	15	49	53	−4	55	
18	Tranmere Rovers	46	13	15	18	50	52	−2	54	
19	Blackpool	46	12	17	17	56	64	−8	53	
20	Rotherham United	46	12	16	18	52	62	−10	52	
21	Hartlepool United (R)	46	11	17	18	44	59	−15	50	Relegation to League Two
22	Milton Keynes Dons (R)	46	12	14	20	45	66	−21	50	Relegation to League Two
23	Swindon Town (R)	46	11	15	20	46	65	−19	48	Relegation to League Two
24	Walsall (R)	46	11	14	21	47	70	−23	47	Relegation to League Two

Rules for classification: 1) Points; 2) Goal difference; 3) Goals scored
(C) Champions; (O) Play-off winners; (P) Promoted; (R) Relegated

Leading goalscorers: Billy Sharp (Scunthorpe United) – 23, and Freddy Eastwood (Southend United) – 23

==== Football League Two ====
Carlisle United were another side who earned a second successive promotion, only two years after a relegation from the League that some predicted would see the end of the club. Northampton Town joined them, making up for two seasons of play-off disappointment, and Leyton Orient ended a decade in the bottom division by earning promotion in almost the last minute of the season. Grimsby Town conceded on 91 minutes, and 14 seconds after the fans of Orient celebrated, Lee Steele scored to seal promotion for Orient. Wycombe started the season with a 21-game unbeaten run that saw five of their players named in the PFA League Two team of the year. Two tragic off-the-field events, however, saw them fall away in the second part of the season before losing to Cheltenham Town in the playoff semi-finals. Grimsby Town lost 1–0 to Cheltenham in the final at the Millennium Stadium.

Rushden & Diamonds failed to improve on the previous season, and paid the price with relegation to the Conference. Oxford United joined them, despite the return of manager Jim Smith, and became the first former winners of a major trophy to be relegated to the Conference, doing so on the last day of the season.

Pos	Team	Pld	W	D	L	GF	GA	GD	Pts	Promotion, qualification or relegation
1	Carlisle United (C, P)	46	25	11	10	84	42	+42	86	Promotion to Football League One
2	Northampton Town (P)	46	22	17	7	63	37	+26	83	Promotion to Football League One
3	Leyton Orient (P)	46	22	15	9	67	51	+16	81	Promotion to Football League One
4	Grimsby Town	46	22	12	12	64	44	+20	78	Qualification for League Two play-offs
5	Cheltenham Town (O, P)	46	19	15	12	65	53	+12	72	Qualification for League Two play-offs
6	Wycombe Wanderers	46	18	17	11	72	56	+16	71	Qualification for League Two play-offs
7	Lincoln City	46	15	21	10	65	53	+12	66	Qualification for League Two play-offs
8	Darlington	46	16	15	15	58	52	+6	63	
9	Peterborough United	46	17	11	18	57	49	+8	62	
10	Shrewsbury Town	46	16	13	17	55	55	0	61	
11	Boston United	46	15	16	15	50	60	−10	61	
12	Bristol Rovers	46	17	9	20	59	67	−8	60	
13	Wrexham	46	15	14	17	61	54	+7	59	
14	Rochdale	46	14	14	18	66	69	−3	56	
15	Chester City	46	14	12	20	53	59	−6	54	
16	Mansfield Town	46	13	15	18	59	66	−7	54	
17	Macclesfield Town	46	12	18	16	60	71	−11	54	
18	Barnet	46	12	18	16	44	57	−13	54	
19	Bury	46	12	17	17	45	57	−12	52 (Note: Bury deducted one point for fielding an ineligible player.)	
20	Torquay United	46	13	13	20	53	66	−13	52	
21	Notts County	46	12	16	18	48	63	−15	52	
22	Stockport County	46	11	19	16	57	78	−21	52	
23	Oxford United (R)	46	11	16	19	43	57	−14	49	Relegation to Football Conference
24	Rushden & Diamonds (R)	46	11	12	23	44	76	−32	45	Relegation to Football Conference

Rules for classification: In the Football League goals scored (GF) takes precedence over goal difference (GD).
(C) Champions; (O) Play-off winners; (P) Promoted; (R) Relegated
Notes:

Leading goalscorer: Rickie Lambert (Rochdale) – 22

=== Non-League football ===
Competition	Winners
Conference National winners	Accrington Stanley
Conference National play-off winners	Hereford United
Conference North winners	Northwich Victoria
Conference South winners	Weymouth
FA Trophy	Grays Athletic
FA Vase	Nantwich Town

== Women's football ==
=== Women's Premier League ===
==== National Division ====
Pos	Team	Pld	W	D	L	GF	GA	GD	Pts	Qualification or relegation
1	Arsenal (C)	18	16	2	0	83	20	+63	50	Qualification for the UEFA Cup qualifying round
2	Everton	18	14	2	2	46	20	+26	44	
3	Charlton Athletic	18	12	3	3	41	13	+28	39	
4	Doncaster Rovers Belles	18	7	2	9	32	34	−2	23	
5	Bristol Academy	18	4	8	6	19	29	−10	20	
6	Birmingham City	18	6	2	10	24	40	−16	20	
7	Leeds United	18	4	6	8	27	36	−9	18	
8	Fulham	18	4	2	12	24	45	−21	14	
9	Sunderland (O)	18	3	4	11	22	57	−35	13	Qualification for relegation playoffs
10	Chelsea (O)	18	3	3	12	22	46	−24	12	Qualification for relegation playoffs

Source: FA WPL
(C) Champions; (O) Play-off winners

==== Northern Division ====
Pos	Team	Pld	W	D	L	GF	GA	GD	Pts	Promotion or relegation
1	Blackburn Rovers (C, P)	22	20	2	0	55	12	+43	62	Promotion to the National Division
2	Liverpool	22	15	3	4	39	17	+22	48	Qualification for the relegation playoffs
3	Tranmere Rovers	22	13	4	5	41	29	+12	43	
4	Lincoln	22	11	3	8	40	31	+9	36	
5	Nottingham Forest	22	8	6	8	33	30	+3	30	
6	Wolverhampton Wanderers	22	6	10	6	29	33	−4	28	
7	Aston Villa	22	8	2	12	33	38	−5	26	
8	Newcastle United	22	6	7	9	32	33	−1	25	
9	Stockport County	22	5	7	10	24	31	−7	22	
10	Curzon Ashton	22	4	6	12	27	64	−37	18	
11	Manchester City	22	3	7	12	19	31	−12	16	
12	Middlesbrough (R)	22	3	3	16	18	41	−23	12	Relegation to the Northern Combination League

Source: FA WPL
(C) Champions; (P) Promoted; (R) Relegated

==== Southern Division ====
Pos	Team	Pld	W	D	L	GF	GA	GD	Pts	Promotion or relegation
1	Cardiff City (C, P)	22	14	7	1	53	17	+36	49	Promotion to the National Division, Qualification for the UEFA Cup qualifying round
2	Bristol City	22	16	1	5	51	30	+21	49	Qualification for the relegation playoffs
3	Watford	22	14	5	3	59	28	+31	47	
4	Portsmouth	22	12	4	6	58	39	+19	40	
5	Millwall Lionesses	22	11	5	6	51	31	+20	38	
6	West Ham United	22	8	4	10	31	33	−2	28	
7	AFC Wimbledon	22	8	3	11	39	52	−13	27	
8	Reading Royals	22	7	2	13	34	42	−8	23	
9	Crystal Palace	22	7	1	14	38	52	−14	22	
10	Southampton Saints	22	6	0	16	30	70	−40	18	
11	Brighton & Hove Albion	22	4	5	13	33	53	−20	17	
12	Langford (R)	22	4	5	13	30	60	−30	17	Relegation to the South East Combination League

Source: FA WPL
(C) Champions; (P) Promoted; (R) Relegated

=== FA Women's Cup ===
==== Final ====
2006 FA Women's Cup Final
- The match programme cover
- Event: 2005–06 FA Women's Cup
Arsenal	Leeds United
5	0
- Date: 1 May 2006
- Venue: The Den, London
- Player of the Match: Lianne Sanderson
- Referee: Phil Crossley (Kent)
- Attendance: 13,452

The 2006 FA Women's Cup Final was the 36th final of the FA Women's Cup, England's primary cup competition for women's football teams. It was the 13th final to be held under the direct control of the Football Association (FA). The final was contested between Arsenal and Leeds United on 1 May 2006 at The Den in New Cross, London. Leeds United made its first final appearance. Arsenal entered a seventh final having won the trophy on all six previous occasions.

Unbeaten League champions Arsenal entered the match as strong favourites, in a contest billed as a contrast of styles. The match attracted a crowd of 13,452 and was broadcast live on BBC One. Goals from Fleeting, Yankey and Sanderson, added to Lucy Ward's early own goal and Kelly Smith's penalty, gave Arsenal an emphatic 5–0 win which secured their seventh FA Cup win and a third "double" in six seasons.

== Background ==
Leeds United legend Allan Clarke presented the women's team with sock tags before the match, similar to those famously worn by the Leeds United male team in their 1972 FA Cup Final victory, in a bid to give the team luck.

== Match ==
=== Summary ===
Arsenal took the lead after three minutes, when Leeds's Lucy Ward – playing out of position at centre-back – miscued a clearance then headed the resultant corner past her own goalkeeper Gemma Fay. On 34 minutes Julie Fleeting made it 2–0, by running onto Lianne Sanderson's pass and shooting low past Fay. One minute later it was 3–0 as Rachel Yankey's attempted cross from a free kick from the right wing sailed over the head of Gemma Fay, who misjudged the flight of the ball.

Fay made several saves to keep the score down, but Arsenal continued to dominate. Leeds manager Julie Chipchase later admitted tactical errors in assigning Nicole Emmanuel a marking job on Kelly Smith and bringing Nat Preston back for her first game since a serious injury in January. Leeds striker Karen Walker was isolated and unable to make an impression in her final game before her retirement. Leeds's best chances were two speculative efforts from Karen Burke, which failed to trouble Arsenal's goalkeeper Emma Byrne.

On 73 minutes, Leeds's 16 year old winger Jess Clarke tripped Yankey to concede a penalty kick which Kelly Smith, playing in her first FA Cup final, converted to make it 4–0. Lianne Sanderson then made a solo dribble down the right wing and shot past Fay to make the score 5–0 on 77 minutes. With five minutes remaining Leeds substituted Karen Walker, who left the pitch for the final time to a standing ovation. Sanderson was named Player of the Match by the BBC television match summariser Marieanne Spacey.

=== Details ===
1 May 2006
13:00 BST

Arsenal	5–0	Leeds United
Ward 3' (o.g.); Fleeting 34'; Yankey 35'; Smith 73' (pen.); Sanderson 77'	Report

The Den, London
Attendance: 13,452
Referee: Phil Crossley (Kent)

Arsenal	Leeds United

GK	1	(Republic of Ireland) Emma Byrne
RB	12	(England) Alex Scott	(substituted off) 84'
CB	6	(England) Faye White (c)
CB	23	(England) Mary Phillip	(substituted off) 78'
LB	5	(England) Leanne Champ
CM	4	(Wales) Jayne Ludlow	(substituted off) 74'
CM	18	(England) Anita Asante
RW	9	(England) Lianne Sanderson
AM	8	(England) Kelly Smith
LW	14	(England) Rachel Yankey
CF	10	(Scotland) Julie Fleeting
Substitutes:
DF	15	(England) Cori Daniels	(substituted on) 84'
MF	11	(England) Rachel McArthur	(substituted on) 78'
MF	7	(Republic of Ireland) Ciara Grant	(substituted on) 74'
DF	2	(England) Kirsty Pealling
FW	20	(England) Gemma Davison
Manager:
(England) Vic Akers

GK	1	(Scotland) Gemma Fay
RB	5	(England) Mel Cook		(substituted off) 52'
CB	14	(England) Natalie Haigh	(yellow card) 26'
CB	10	(England) Lucy Ward
LB	17	(England) Alex Culvin
RM	7	(England) Nicole Emmanuel	(yellow card) 65'
CM	6	(England) Natalie Preston (c)		(substituted off) 85'
LM	4	(England) Karen Burke
RW	12	(England) Jessica Clarke
CF	9	(England) Karen Walker		(substituted off) 85'
LW	8	(England) Sue Smith
Substitutes:
MF	18	(England) Sophie Walton		(substituted on) 52'
FW	11	(England) Sarah Owen		(substituted on) 85'
FW	16	(England) Tania Panesar		(substituted on) 85'
DF	3	(England) Julie Grundy
DF	15	(England) Sophie Clough
Manager:
(England) Julie Chipchase

Player of the match

- Lianne Sanderson (Arsenal)

Match officials

- Assistant Referees:
  - S.T. Rubery (Essex)
  - S.W. Tincknell (Hertfordshire)
- Fourth Official: P.N. Gibbs (Birmingham)

Match rules

- 90 minutes.
- 30 minutes of extra-time if necessary.
- Penalty shoot-out if scores still level.
- Five named substitutes.
- Maximum of three substitutions.

== Transfer deals ==
=== Summer transfer window ===
The summer transfer window ran from the end of the previous season until 31 August.

=== January transfer window ===
The mid-season transfer window ran from 1 to 31 January 2006.

For subsequent transfer deals see List of English football transfers 2006–07

== Famous debutants ==
- Micah Richards, 17-year-old defender, bursts onto the scene for Manchester City against Arsenal in a 1–0 Premier League defeat at Highbury on 22 October 2005.
- Theo Walcott, 16-year-old forward, makes his debut for Southampton on the opening day of the Championship season as a substitute in the goalless home draw with Wolverhampton Wanderers – the club's first game outside the top flight for nearly 30 years.

== Retirements ==
- 22 April 2006 — Alan Shearer, 35, retires after being ruled out for the rest of the season by an injury suffered on 17 April in his 404th appearance for Newcastle United since joining them in 1996. He was due to retire at the end of the season but the injury meant that the game against Sunderland was his last.
- 8 May 2006 — Duncan Ferguson, 34, leaves Everton on a free transfer at the end of his playing career which has also taken in spells at Dundee United, Glasgow Rangers and Newcastle United, the last of which came between his two spells with Everton.
- 17 May 2006 — Dennis Bergkamp, 37, decided to retire after the 2006 UEFA Champions League Final defeat to Barcelona, ending an 11-year stint at Arsenal. He also had experience playing for Ajax and Internazionale. He was ranked 2nd on the list of 50 greatest players to play for Arsenal, behind record Arsenal goalscorer, Thierry Henry.
- 8 June 2006 — Nigel Martyn, 39, retires due to an ankle injury. He spent the final three seasons of his career at Everton having signed from Leeds United in September 2003, and earlier in his career had spells with Bristol Rovers and Crystal Palace, as well as being an England goalkeeper.
- 12 June 2006 — Roy Keane, 34, who until 18 November spent more than 12 years with Manchester United before joining Celtic, retires due to a long-standing hip injury. He arrived onto the English football scene in 1990 with Nottingham Forest.

== Deaths ==
- 8 September 2005 — Noel Cantwell, 72, died of cancer. He was a Republic of Ireland international at left-back during the 1950s and 1960s. He also captained Manchester United's FA Cup winning team in 1963. As a manager he led Coventry City to their only European campaign in 1969–70.
- 11 October 2005 - Oscar Hold, 85, played 104 league games for Aldershot, Norwich City, Notts County, Everton and QPR as a forward before moving into management, where he took charge of Doncaster Rovers, Fenerbahce and Goztepe of Turkey, and Apollon Limassol of Cyprus before retiring from the game in 1984. By the time of his death, he was living in Sunderland.
- 18 October 2005 — Johnny Haynes, 71, former England and Fulham midfielder, who became the first English footballer to be paid £100-a-week, died after suffering a brain haemorrhage while driving in Edinburgh, resulting in a head-on collision with another vehicle.
- 26 October 2005 — George Swindin, 90, was a former goalkeeper of Arsenal in the 1930s to the 1950s. He helped them win two league titles and one FA Cup. After retiring, he served Arsenal as manager.
- 25 November 2005 — George Best, 59, Northern-Irish-born striker who enjoyed the early and most successful years of his career Manchester United, died in London's Cromwell Hospital from multiple organ failure, the result of more than 30 years of heavy drinking, three years after he underwent a liver transplant. Personal problems meant that he played his last game for United at the age of 27, but he continued at various smaller clubs – including a brief spell with the Los Angeles Aztecs in America – until the age of 37, when he played his last professional game at AFC Bournemouth. His death dominated news bulletins and his funeral was shown live on the BBC.
- 26 December 2005 — Ted Ditchburn, 84, former England and Tottenham goalkeeper.
- 14 January 2006 — Mark Philo, 21, Wycombe winger, was killed in a car crash.
- 9 February 2006 — Ron Greenwood, 84, former West Ham United and England manager. He managed West Ham to victory in the FA Cup in 1964 and Cup Winners' Cup success a year later. Greenwood later managed the England team, achieving qualification for Euro 80 and the 1982 World Cup.
- 1 March 2006 — Peter Osgood, 59, former England striker, died of a heart attack while attending a family funeral. He played in Chelsea's 1970 FA Cup and 1971 Cup Winners' Cup victories, and won another FA Cup medal in 1976 with his next club Southampton.
- 3 April 2006 - Billy Kiernan, 80, played 378 league games as a left winger for Charlton Athletic between 1949 and 1961 after playing in Hong Kong where he was stationed with the Royal Ulster Rifles. He also starred for the London XI which participated in the Inter-Cities Fairs Cup in the late 1950s.
- 18 April 2006 — John Lyall, 66, former West Ham United and Ipswich Town manager, died of a heart attack. He completed his first season in management at West Ham with FA Cup glory in 1975, winning the trophy again in 1980 and taking West Ham to their highest-ever league position – third – in 1986. He was sacked when West Ham were relegated in 1989, but made a comeback the following year with Ipswich Town. Lyall took Ipswich into the inaugural Premier League as Second Division champions in 1992, and remained in charge for another 2 1/2 years before he was sacked in December 1994. Lyall never returned to management after his dismissal from Ipswich.
- 24 April 2006 — Brian Labone, 66, former Everton captain who played in Harry Catterick's successful 1960s side, died of a heart attack. He helped them win the FA Cup in 1966 as well as the league title in 1963 and 1970. Labone was also capped 26 times by England between 1962 and 1970, but did not make the squad for England's victorious 1966 World Cup campaign.
