= 2006 FA Women's Cup final =

2006 FA Women's Cup Final
- The match programme cover
- Event: 2005–06 FA Women's Cup
Arsenal	Leeds United
5	0
- Date: 1 May 2006
- Venue: The Den, London
- Player of the Match: Lianne Sanderson (Arsenal)
- Referee: Phil Crossley (Kent)
- Attendance: 13,452

The 2006 FA Women's Cup Final was the 36th final of the FA Women's Cup, England's primary cup competition for women's football teams. It was the 13th final to be held under the direct control of the Football Association (FA). The final was contested between Arsenal and Leeds United on 1 May 2006 at The Den in New Cross, London. Leeds United made its first final appearance. Arsenal entered a seventh final having won the trophy on all six previous occasions.

Unbeaten League champions Arsenal entered the match as strong favourites, in a contest billed as a contrast of styles. The match attracted a crowd of 13,452 and was broadcast live on BBC One. Goals from Fleeting, Yankey and Sanderson, added to Lucy Ward's early own goal and Kelly Smith's penalty, gave Arsenal an emphatic 5–0 win which secured their seventh FA Cup win and a third "double" in six seasons.

== Background ==
Leeds United legend Allan Clarke presented the women's team with sock tags before the match, similar to those famously worn by the Leeds United male team in their 1972 FA Cup Final victory, in a bid to give the team luck.

== Match ==
=== Summary ===
Arsenal took the lead after three minutes, when Leeds's Lucy Ward – playing out of position at centre-back – miscued a clearance then headed the resultant corner past her own goalkeeper Gemma Fay. On 34 minutes Julie Fleeting made it 2–0, by running onto Lianne Sanderson's pass and shooting low past Fay. One minute later it was 3–0 as Rachel Yankey's attempted cross from a free kick from the right wing sailed over the head of Gemma Fay, who misjudged the flight of the ball.

Fay made several saves to keep the score down, but Arsenal continued to dominate. Leeds manager Julie Chipchase later admitted tactical errors in assigning Nicole Emmanuel a marking job on Kelly Smith and bringing Nat Preston back for her first game since a serious injury in January. Leeds striker Karen Walker was isolated and unable to make an impression in her final game before her retirement. Leeds's best chances were two speculative efforts from Karen Burke, which failed to trouble Arsenal's goalkeeper Emma Byrne.

On 73 minutes, Leeds's 16 year old winger Jess Clarke tripped Yankey to concede a penalty kick which Kelly Smith, playing in her first FA Cup final, converted to make it 4–0. Lianne Sanderson then made a solo dribble down the right wing and shot past Fay to make the score 5–0 on 77 minutes. With five minutes remaining Leeds substituted Karen Walker, who left the pitch for the final time to a standing ovation. Sanderson was named Player of the Match by the BBC television match summariser Marieanne Spacey.

=== Details ===
1 May 2006
13:00 BST

Arsenal	5–0	Leeds United
Ward 3' (o.g.); Fleeting 34'; Yankey 35'; Smith 73' (pen.); Sanderson 77'	Report

The Den, London
Attendance: 13,452
Referee: Phil Crossley (Kent)

Arsenal	Leeds United

GK	1	(Republic of Ireland) Emma Byrne
RB	12	(England) Alex Scott	(substituted off) 84'
CB	6	(England) Faye White (c)
CB	23	(England) Mary Phillip	(substituted off) 78'
LB	5	(England) Leanne Champ
CM	4	(Wales) Jayne Ludlow	(substituted off) 74'
CM	18	(England) Anita Asante
RW	9	(England) Lianne Sanderson
AM	8	(England) Kelly Smith
LW	14	(England) Rachel Yankey
CF	10	(Scotland) Julie Fleeting
Substitutes:
DF	15	(England) Cori Daniels	(substituted on) 84'
MF	11	(England) Rachel McArthur	(substituted on) 78'
MF	7	(Republic of Ireland) Ciara Grant	(substituted on) 74'
DF	2	(England) Kirsty Pealling
FW	20	(England) Gemma Davison
Manager:
(England) Vic Akers

GK	1	(Scotland) Gemma Fay
RB	5	(England) Mel Cook		(substituted off) 52'
CB	14	(England) Natalie Haigh	(yellow card) 26'
CB	10	(England) Lucy Ward
LB	17	(England) Alex Culvin
RM	7	(England) Nicole Emmanuel	(yellow card) 65'
CM	6	(England) Natalie Preston (c)		(substituted off) 85'
LM	4	(England) Karen Burke
RW	12	(England) Jessica Clarke
CF	9	(England) Karen Walker		(substituted off) 85'
LW	8	(England) Sue Smith
Substitutes:
MF	18	(England) Sophie Walton		(substituted on) 52'
FW	11	(England) Sarah Owen		(substituted on) 85'
FW	16	(England) Tania Panesar		(substituted on) 85'
DF	3	(England) Julie Grundy
DF	15	(England) Sophie Clough
Manager:
(England) Julie Chipchase

Player of the match
Lianne Sanderson (Arsenal)

Assistant referees:
S.T. Rubery (Essex)
S.W. Tincknell (Hertfordshire)
Fourth official:
P.N. Gibbs (Birmingham)

Match rules

- 90 minutes.
- 30 minutes of extra-time if necessary.
- Penalty shoot-out if scores still level.
- Five named substitutes.
- Maximum of three substitutions.
