= 2005–06 FA Women's Premier League Cup =

Tournament details
- Country: England
- Dates: 28 August 2005 – 5 March 2006
- Teams: 34

Final positions
- Champions: Charlton Athletic
- Runners-up: Arsenal

The 2005–06 FA Women's Premier League Cup was the 15th edition of the FA Women's Premier League Cup, which began in 1991. It was sponsored by Nationwide and was officially known as the FA Nationwide Women's Premier League Cup. The competition was contested by all 34 teams of the three divisions of the FA Women's Premier League (National Division, Northern Division and Southern Division). Charlton Athletic won their second title after a 2–1 win over Arsenal in the final.

== Results ==
All results listed are published by The Football Association (FA). The division each team play in is indicated in brackets after their name: (NA)=National Division; (NO)=Northern Division; (S)=Southern Division.

=== Preliminary round ===
28 August 2005	Blackburn Rovers (NO)	2–1	Lincoln City (NO)
14:00	Anderton; Bateman	Report	Aisthorpe

28 August 2005	Langford (S)	2–7	Curzon Ashton (NO)
14:00	Thomas; Waghorn	Report	Baird; Carter; Hindley; Maylett

=== First round ===
The matches were played on 11 September 2005, the only exception being Arsenal v Wolverhampton Wanderers, which took place on 2 October 2005.

11 September 2005	AFC Wimbledon (S)	5–2	West Ham United (S)
14:00	Goal	Report	Aherne; Roache

11 September 2005	Aston Villa (NO)	4–6	Everton (NA)
14:00	Quick; Franklin; Packer	Report	Parry; Duffy; F. Williams; Byrne

11 September 2005	Blackburn Rovers (NO)	5–0	Curzon Ashton (NO)
14:00	Bell; Brusell; Twohig; Bailey	Report

11 September 2005	Cardiff City (S)	1–5	Sunderland (NA)
14:00	Harries	Report	Bell; Carr; Reay; Redhead; S. Williams

11 September 2005	Chelsea (NA)	3–5 (a.e.t.)	Bristol City (S)
14:00	De la Salle; Langrish; White	Report	Bevan; Tinson

11 September 2005	Doncaster Rovers Belles (NA)	2–2 (a.e.t.) (4–3 p)	Liverpool (NO)
14:00	Exley; Walsh	Report	Thomas
	Penalties
	Penalty scored		Penalty scored Penalty missed

11 September 2005	Fulham (NA)	1–1 (a.e.t.) (5–6 p)	Manchester City (NO)
14:00	Clarke	Report	Savage
	Penalties
	Penalty scored Penalty missed		Penalty scored

11 September 2005	Leeds United (NA)	1–2	Bristol Academy (NA)
14:00	Walker	Report	Cox; Kidwell

11 September 2005	Millwall Lionesses (S)	1–0	Nottingham Forest (NO)
14:00	Lennon	Report

11 September 2005	Newcastle United (NO)	3–4 (a.e.t.)	Middlesbrough (NO)
14:00	McCubbing; Newton; Robson	Report	Cullen; Stephenson; Winn; Close

11 September 2005	Portsmouth (S)	1–0	Crystal Palace (S)
14:00	Niven	Report

11 September 2005	Reading Royals (S)	0–6	Charlton Athletic (NA)
14:00		Report	Ritchie 6'; Aluko 7', 61'; Stoney 12'; Barr 74', 87'

11 September 2005	Stockport County (NO)	0–4	Birmingham City (NA)
14:00		Report	Ballard; Maggs; Ryan; Wooliscroft

11 September 2005	Tranmere Rovers (NO)	2–0	Brighton & Hove Albion (S)
14:00	Abbott; Campbell	Report

11 September 2005	Watford (S)	3–0	Southampton Saints (S)
14:00	Hall; Lander	Report

2 October 2005	Arsenal (NA)	5–0	Wolverhampton Wanderers (NO)	Borehamwood
14:00	A. Scott 10'; Smith 25', 43'; Ludlow 45'; Grant 65'	Report		Stadium: Meadow Park

=== Second round ===
The matches were played on 9 October 2005, the only exception being Manchester City v Arsenal, which took place on 23 October 2005.

9 October 2005	AFC Wimbledon (S)	0–3	Sunderland (NA)
14:00		Report	Reay; J. Scott

9 October 2005	Bristol City (S)	3–2	Millwall Lionesses (S)
14:00	Barrett; Hemmings; Tinson	Report	Mason; C. Williams

9 October 2005	Charlton Athletic (NA)	13–0	Portsmouth (S)
14:00	Adams 7'; Snare 12', 65'; Barr 16', 42', 62' (pen.); Chapman 21', 41', 50'; Stoney 49' (pen.); Potter 54', 90'; Ritchie 79'	Report

9 October 2005	Doncaster Rovers Belles (NA)	3–0 (a.e.t.)	Birmingham City (NA)
14:00	Exley; Heckler	Report

9 October 2005	Everton (NA)	2–0	Blackburn Rovers (NO)
14:00	Parry; McDougall	Report

9 October 2005	Tranmere Rovers (NO)	7–0	Middlesbrough (NO)
14:00	Abbott; Jones; Kenwright	Report

9 October 2005	Watford (S)	2–5	Bristol Academy (NA)
14:00	Rebelo	Report	Holtham; Kerton; Ward; Ward

23 October 2005	Manchester City (NO)	0–4	Arsenal (NA)
14:00		Report	Ludlow 15'; McArthur 22'; Smith (pen.)

=== Quarter-finals ===
The matches were played on 6 November 2005, the only exception being Sunderland v Everton, which took place on 13 November 2005.

6 November 2005	Arsenal (NA)	5–0	Bristol City (S)	Borehamwood
14:00	Ludlow 44'; Smith 60' (pen.); Sanderson 70'; Asante 72'; Grant 89'	Report		Stadium: Meadow Park

6 November 2005	Charlton Athletic (NA)	1–0	Bristol Academy (NA)
14:00	Aluko 90'	Report

6 November 2005	Doncaster Rovers Belles (NA)	3–2	Tranmere Rovers (NO)
14:00	Walsh; Cantrell; Twaddle 55'	Report	Abbott 62' (pen.); Jones 74'

13 November 2005	Sunderland (NA)	1–3	Everton (NA)
14:00	Carr 28'	Report	F. Williams 38' (pen.), 83'; McDougall 45+2'

=== Semi-finals ===
All matches were played on 11 December 2005.

11 December 2005	Doncaster Rovers Belles (NA)	0–2	Charlton Athletic (NA)
14:00		Report	Aluko 35'; Chapman 41'

11 December 2005	Everton (NA)	0–2	Arsenal (NA)	Crosby, Merseyside
14:00		Report	Ludlow 40'; Fleeting 82'	Stadium: Rossett Park

=== Final ===
5 March 2006
14:00

Arsenal	1–2	Charlton Athletic
Fleeting 75'	Report	Aluko 28', 45+1'

Adams Park, High Wycombe
Attendance: 3,506

== See also ==
- 2005–06 FA Women's Premier League
- 2006 FA Women's Cup Final
