= 2005–06 FA Women's Cup =

Football tournament season in England

Tournament details
- Country: England; Wales
- Teams: 222

Final positions
- Champions: Arsenal
- Runners-up: Leeds United
- Penalty shoot-outs do not count towards the total number of goals.

The 2005–06 FA Women's Cup was an association football knockout tournament for women's teams, held between 4 September 2005 and 1 May 2006. It was the 36th season of the FA Women's Cup and was won by Arsenal, who defeated Leeds United in the final. The tournament consisted of a preliminary round, two qualifying rounds and eight rounds of competition proper.

The competition began on 4 September 2005 when the 4 lowest–ranked teams in the tournament took part in the preliminary round.

All match results and dates from the Women's FA Cup Website.

== Preliminary round ==
All games were played on 4 September 2005.

| Tie | Home team (tier) | Score | Away team (tier) | Att. |
|---|---|---|---|---|
| 1 | Braintree Town | 3–2 | Eastbourne Borough | |
| 2 | C&K Basildon | 0–2 | Crowborough Athletic | |

== First round qualifying ==
All games were played on 11 September 2005.

| Tie | Home team (tier) | Score | Away team (tier) | Att. |
|---|---|---|---|---|
| 1 | AFC Bournemouth | 5–1 | Poole Town | |
| 2 | AFC Kempston Rovers | 3–2 | East Preston | |
| 3 | Aldershot Town | 3–1 | Stevenage | |
| 4 | Aylesbury Vale | 2–3 (a.e.t.) | Haywards Heath Town | |
| 5 | Banbury United | 3–2 | Brentwood Town | |
| 6 | Barnsley | 5–0 | Darlington Railway Athletic | |
| 7 | Bath City | 5–2 | Holway United | |
| 8 | Battersea & Wandsworth | 1–2 | Woking | |
| 9 | Billericay Town | 2–1 | Saffron Walden Town | |
| 10 | Blyth Town Lions | 3–2 | Wakefield Hall Green | |
| 11 | Bolton Ambassadors | 2–6 | Blyth Spartans | |
| 12 | Bourne United | 1–0 | Peterborough Sports | |
| 13 | Bradford City | 7–1 | Buxton | |
| 14 | Bury Girls & Ladies | 4–0 | Wigan | |
| 15 | Cambridge Rangers | 1–5 | Dudley United | |
| 16 | Carterton | 2–2 (3–1 p) | Corinthian Casuals | |
| 17 | Chelmsford City | 3–2 | Abbey Rangers | |
| 18 | Corby Stewarts & Lloyds | 2–4 (a.e.t.) | AFC Telford United | |
| 19 | Darwen | 10–0 | Macclesfield Town | |
| 20 | Denton Town | 3–1 | Gateshead Cleveland Hall | |
| 21 | Dover Athletic | 5–3 | Arlesey Town | |
| 22 | Durham City | 0–6 | Redcar Town | |
| 23 | Dynamo North London | 4–3 | Croydon Athletic | |
| 24 | Eastbourne Town | 0–9 | Whitehawk | |
| 25 | Exeter City | 1–2 | Frome Town | |
| 26 | Gloucester City | 12–0 | Alphington | |
| 27 | Great Berry | 0–2 | Wingate & Finchley | |
| 28 | Haringey Borough | 7–3 | Kent Magpies | |
| 29 | Hastings United | H–W | Leighton Linslade | |
Walkover for Hastings United.
| 30 | Henley Town | 6–5 (a.e.t.) | UKP | |
| 31 | Hereford Pegasus | 9–0 | Brize Norton | |
| 32 | Hoddesdon Owls | 0–1 | Crowborough Athletic | |
| 33 | Huddersfield Town | 6–2 (a.e.t.) | Bolton Wanderers | |

| Tie | Home team (tier) | Score | Away team (tier) | Att. |
|---|---|---|---|---|
| 34 | Ilminster Town | 1–6 | Saltash United | |
| 35 | Kettering Town | 5–4 | Birstall FL&E | |
| 36 | Launceston | 2–4 | Penzance | |
| 37 | Launton | 0–10 | Staines Town | |
| 38 | Leicester City | 5–0 | Cambridge United | |
| 39 | Liverpool Manweb Feds | 4–0 | Warrington Town | |
| 40 | London Women | 0–3 | Woodbridge Town | |
| 41 | Lordswood | 7–0 | Aylesbury United | |
| 42 | Lumley | 11–1 | Forest Hall | |
| 43 | Mansfield Road | 2–3 | Ross Town | |
| 44 | Met | 1–3 | Newport Pagnell Town | |
| 45 | MK Wanderers | 2–3 | Gravesend & Northfleet | |
| 46 | Newbury | 4–1 | Kings Sports Luton | |
| 47 | Oadby Town | 6–4 | Sandiacre Town | |
| 48 | Ossett Albion | 0–4 | Morley Spurs | |
| 49 | Penrith AFC | 2–4 (a.e.t.) | Windscale | |
| 50 | Peterborough Azure | 2–5 | Lichfield Diamonds | |
| 51 | Reading | 4–2 (a.e.t.) | Chinnor | |
| 52 | Rothwell Town | 1–9 | Solihull | |
| 53 | Rushcliffe Eagles | 5–0 | Cresswell Wanderers | |
| 54 | Sawbridgeworth Town | 1–0 | Tottenham Hotspur | |
| 55 | Shanklin | 2–0 | St Peter's | |
| 56 | Shepshed Dynamo | 3–1 | Cambridge University | |
| 57 | Slough | 3–2 | Brentford | |
| 58 | South Notts | 5–0 | Colchester Town | |
| 59 | Southam United | 7–0 | Kirkley | |
| 60 | Stoke City | 0–1 | Birmingham Athletic | |
| 61 | Tamworth Lionesses | 0–2 | Copsewood Coventry | |
| 62 | Team Bath | 3–2 | Central | |
| 63 | Thatcham Town | 3–1 | Braintree Town | |
| 64 | Thurrock & Tilbury | 0–4 | Sheerness East | |
| 65 | Tower Hamlets | 1–2 | Lewes | |
| 66 | Tring Athletic | 1–3 | Acton Sports Club | |
| 67 | Upper Beeding | 1–4 | Barking | |
| 68 | Walsall | 4–4 (4–3 p) | Lincoln City | |
| 69 | Worcester City | 0–5 | Yeovil Town | |
| 70 | Wycombe Wanderers | 3–1 | Harlow Athletic | |
| 71 | Wyrley | 5–1 | Stratford Town | |
| 72 | York City | 11–0 | Kirklees | |

== Second round qualifying ==
All games were played on 25 September 2005.

| Tie | Home team (tier) | Score | Away team (tier) | Att. |
|---|---|---|---|---|
| 1 | AFC Kempston Rovers | 1–2 | Woking | |
| 2 | Aldershot Town | 2–3 | Thatcham Town | |
| 3 | Bath City | 2–4 | Frome Town | |
| 4 | Billericay Town | 2–1 | Lordswood | |
| 5 | Blyth Town Lions | 4–3 | Bradford City | |
| 6 | Bourne United | 2–1 | Oadby Town | |
| 7 | Chelmsford City | 9–0 | Newport Pagnell Town | |
| 8 | Copsewood Coventry | 1–2 | Solihull | |
| 9 | Crowborough Athletic | 2–0 | Barking | |
| 10 | Dudley United | 2–3 | Lichfield Diamonds | |
| 11 | Gloucester City | 2–3 | Team Bath | |
| 12 | Gravesend & Northfleet | 6–1 | Carterton | |
| 13 | Haringey Borough | 10–1 | Banbury United | |
| 14 | Hastings United | 9–2 | Dover Athletic | |
| 15 | Henley Town | 0–1 | Dynamo North London | |
| 16 | Huddersfield Town | 4–0 | Darwen | |

| Tie | Home team (tier) | Score | Away team (tier) | Att. |
|---|---|---|---|---|
| 17 | Liverpool Manweb Feds | 3–5 | Bury Girls & Ladies | |
| 18 | Lumley | 1–3 | Blyth Spartans | |
| 19 | Newbury | 2–6 | Lewes | |
| 20 | Penzance | 11–0 | Saltash United | |
| 21 | Reading | 0–7 | Yeovil Town | |
| 22 | Redcar Town | 1–7 | Morley Spurs | |
| 23 | Ross Town | 3–4 | Hereford Pegasus | |
| 24 | Rushcliffe Eagles | 1–2 | Kettering Town | |
| 25 | Sawbridgeworth Town | 2–4 | Whitehawk | |
| 26 | Shanklin | 1–1 (4–2 p) | AFC Bournemouth | |
| 27 | Sheerness East | 5–1 | Wycombe Wanderers | |
| 28 | Shepshed Dynamo | 0–6 | Leicester City | |
| 29 | Slough | 5–0 | Haywards Heath Town | |
| 30 | South Notts | 1–3 | Birmingham Athletic | |
| 31 | Southam United | 2–3 | AFC Telford United | |
| 32 | Staines Town | 4–2 | Acton Sports Club | |
| 33 | Windscale | 1–3 | Barnsley | |
| 34 | Wingate & Finchley | 2–4 | Woodbridge Town | |
| 35 | Wyrley | 4–2 | Walsall | |
| 36 | York City | 2–2 (5–4 p) | Denton Town | |

== First round proper ==
All games were scheduled for 23 October 2005.

| Tie | Home team (tier) | Score | Away team (tier) | Att. |
|---|---|---|---|---|
| 1 | Barnsley | 1–2 | Blyth Spartans | |
| 2 | Billericay Town | 1–6 | Hastings United | |
| 3 | Birmingham Athletic | 1–5 | Alfreton Town | |
| 4 | Blackpool Wren Rovers | 1–7 | Sheffield Wednesday | |
| 5 | Blyth Town Lions | 4–6 | Leeds City Vixens | |
| 6 | Bury Girls & Ladies | 2–4 | Huddersfield Town | |
| 7 | Chesham United | 3–4 | Barnet | |
| 8 | Chesterfield | 2–1 | Shrewsbury Town | |
| 9 | Colchester United | 7–0 | Dynamo North London | |
| 10 | Crewe Alexandra | 1–2 | York City | |
| 11 | Crowborough Athletic | 0–4 | Queens Park Rangers | |
| 12 | Dagenham & Redbridge | 5–2 | Chelmsford City | |
| 13 | Doncaster Parkland Rovers | 0–2 | Chester Le Street | |
| 14 | Enfield Town | 3–1 | Luton Town | |
| 15 | Florence | 2–3 | Morley Spurs | |
| 16 | Forest Green Rovers | 1–0 | Newton Abbot | |
| 17 | Gillingham | 1–2 (a.e.t.) | Leyton Orient | |
| 18 | Gravesend & Northfleet | 4–0 | Woking | |
| 19 | Haringey Borough | 2–5 | Staines Town | |
| 20 | Ipswich Town | 7–0 | Kettering Town | |

| Tie | Home team (tier) | Score | Away team (tier) | Att. |
|---|---|---|---|---|
| 21 | Keynsham Town | 4–1 | Shanklin | |
| 22 | Leafield Athletic | 5–4 (a.e.t.) | Derby County | |
| 23 | Leicester City | 12–1 | Solihull | |
| 24 | Lewes | 7–0 | Thatcham Town | |
| 25 | Lichfield Diamonds | 4–2 | Wyrley | |
| 26 | Loughborough Students | 7–0 | Stafford Rangers | |
| 27 | Newquay | 5–3 | Team Bath | |
| 28 | Northampton Town | 2–1 | Coventry United | |
| 29 | Norwich City | 0–0 (?–? p) | Leicester City Ladies | |
| 30 | Oxford City | 2–4 | Frome Town | |
| 31 | Penzance | 2–1 (a.e.t.) | Winscombe | |
| 32 | Plymouth Argyle | 0–4 | Hereford Pegasus | |
| 33 | Preston North End | 8–0 | South Durham Royals | |
| 34 | Rotherham United | 6–1 | Chester City | |
| 35 | Scunthorpe United | 0–0 (?–? p) | Garswood Saints | |
| 36 | Sophtlogic | 4–2 | Bedford Town Bells | |
| 37 | Swindon Town | 1–0 | Yeovil Town | |
| 38 | The New Saints & Shrewsbury Town | 8–0 | AFC Telford United | |
| 39 | Whitehawk | 3–1 | Swale Magpies | |
| 40 | Woodbridge Town | 2–3 (a.e.t.) | Slough | |

== Second round proper ==
All games were originally scheduled for 13 and 27 November 2005.

| Tie | Home team (tier) | Score | Away team (tier) | Att. |
|---|---|---|---|---|
| 1 | Alfreton Town | 3–3 (?–? p) | Ipswich Town | |
| 2 | Barnet | 1–0 | Dagenham & Redbridge | |
| 3 | Blyth Spartans | 3–2 (a.e.t.) | Chester Le Street | |
| 4 | Chesterfield | 0–2 | Northampton Town | |
| 5 | Frome Town | 6–1 | Swindon Town | |
| 6 | Gravesend & Northfleet | 0–1 | Colchester United | |
| 7 | Hereford Pegasus | 3–0 | Penzance | |
| 8 | Leeds City Vixens | 6–1 | York City | |
| 9 | Leicester City | 3–2 | Lichfield Diamonds | |
| 10 | Leyton Orient | 5–3 | Hastings United | |

| Tie | Home team (tier) | Score | Away team (tier) | Att. |
|---|---|---|---|---|
| 11 | Loughborough Students | 1–2 | Leicester City Ladies | |
| 12 | Morley Spurs | 0–0 (2–4 p) | Huddersfield Town | |
| 13 | Newquay | 1–5 | Keynsham Town | |
| 14 | Preston North End | 8–1 | Garswood Saints | |
| 15 | Queens Park Rangers | 6–0 | Lewes | |
| 16 | Sheffield Wednesday | 1–2 | Rotherham United | |
| 17 | Slough | 1–0 | Forest Green Rovers | |
| 18 | Sophtlogic | 1–4 | Staines Town | |
| 19 | The New Saints & Shrewsbury Town | 1–1 (?–? p) | Leafield Athletic | |
| 20 | Whitehawk | 3–0 | Enfield Town | |

== Third round proper ==
All games were originally scheduled for 4 and 11 December 2005 and 8 January 2006.

| Tie | Home team (tier) | Score | Away team (tier) | Att. |
|---|---|---|---|---|
| 1 | AFC Wimbledon | 3–1 | Crystal Palace | |
| 2 | Aston Villa | 1–0 | Wolverhampton Wanderers | |
| 3 | Barnet | 4–1 | West Ham United | |
| 4 | Blackburn Rovers | 3–1 | Lincoln City | |
| 5 | Brighton & Hove Albion | 3–0 | Leyton Orient | |
| 6 | Bristol City | 4–2 | Reading Royals | |
| 7 | Cardiff City | 2–0 | Keynsham Town | |
| 8 | Colchester United | 3–2 (a.e.t.) | Staines Town | |
| 9 | Curzon Ashton | 6–0 | Blyth Spartans | |
| 10 | Hereford Pegasus | 3–3 (?–? p) | Frome Town | |

| Tie | Home team (tier) | Score | Away team (tier) | Att. |
|---|---|---|---|---|
| 11 | Ipswich Town | 2–0 | Leicester City Ladies | |
| 12 | Langford | 2–1 | Whitehawk | |
| 13 | Leeds City Vixens | 5–1 | Rotherham United | |
| 14 | Liverpool | 2–1 | Tranmere Rovers | |
| 15 | Middlesbrough | 1–2 | Manchester City | |
| 16 | Newcastle United | 7–2 | Huddersfield Town | |
| 17 | Northampton Town | 2–1 | The New Saints & Shrewsbury Town | |
| 18 | Nottingham Forest | 3–1 | Leicester City | |
| 19 | Portsmouth | 2–1 | Millwall Lionesses | |
| 20 | Preston North End | 1–2 (a.e.t.) | Stockport County | |
| 21 | Southampton Saints | 3–1 | Slough | |
| 22 | Watford | 3–0 | Queens Park Rangers | |

== Fourth round proper ==
All games were originally scheduled for 8 and 15 January 2006.

| 8 January 2006 | AFC Wimbledon (2) | 1–3 | Watford (2) | Norbiton |
| | L. Smith 58' | Report | Lander 6'; O'Toole 44'; Hall 88' | Stadium: Kingsmeadow; Attendance: 60 |

| 8 January 2006 | Blackburn Rovers (2) | 1–2 (a.e.t.) | Chelsea (1) | Brockhall Village |
| | Anderton | Report | Found 68'; White 112' | Stadium: Blackburn Rovers Training Ground |

| 8 January 2006 | Cardiff City (2) | 1–4 | Arsenal (1) | Cardiff |
| | Dykes 23' | Report | Fleeting 10'; White 65'; Yankey 70' | Stadium: Cardiff Athletics Stadium |

| 8 January 2006 | Everton (1) | 2–0 | Nottingham Forest (2) | Crosby |
| | Handley 18'; Evans 33' | Report | | Stadium: Rossett Park |

| 8 January 2006 | Fulham (1) | 6–0 | Southampton Saints (2) |
| | Lorton (pen.); Horwood; Suzi | Report |

| 8 January 2006 | Ipswich Town (3) | 0–7 | Birmingham City (1) |
| | | Report | Carney; Bassett; Lacey; Robson; Ballard |

| 8 January 2006 | Langford (2) | 0–1 (a.e.t.) | Brighton & Hove Albion (2) |
| | | Report | Goal |

| 8 January 2006 | Leeds City Vixens (3) | 4–5 | Aston Villa (2) |
| | Goal | Report | Goal |

| 8 January 2006 | Leeds United (1) | 2–1 | Doncaster Rovers Belles (1) | Beeston |
| | Culvin; Walker | Report | Twaddle | Stadium: The South Leeds Stadium |

| 8 January 2006 | Liverpool (2) | 1–0 | Colchester United (3) |
| | Goal | Report |

| 8 January 2006 | Manchester City (2) | 0–2 | Barnet (3) |
| | | Report | Goal |

| 8 January 2006 | Portsmouth (2) | 5–5 (a.e.t.) (5–6 p) | Bristol Academy (1) |
| | Thorp; Wilson; Nash | Report | Ward; Yorston; Hopkins |
| | Penalties |
| | Penalty missed Penalty scored | | Penalty missed Penalty scored |

| 8 January 2006 | Stockport County (2) | 1–1 | Frome Town (3) |
| | Goal | Report | Goal |

| 15 January 2006 | Bristol City (2) | 1–4 | Charlton Athletic (1) | Almondsbury |
| | Tinson 48' | Report | Cardin 21'; Stoney 80'; Ritchie 82'; Aluko 83' | Stadium: Oaklands Park |

| 15 January 2006 | Newcastle United (2) | 3–1 | Northampton Town (3) | Newcastle upon Tyne |
| | Newton 31', 37'; Scott 84' | Report | Beckett 48' | Stadium: Scotswood |

| 15 January 2006 | Sunderland (1) | 2–2 (a.e.t.) (3–4 p) | Curzon Ashton (2) |
| | Reay 72' (pen.); Houghton 100' | Report | Hindley 90+7', 98' |
| | Penalties |
| | Penalty scored Penalty missed | | Penalty scored |

== Fifth round proper ==
All games were played on 29 January 2006.

| 29 January 2006 | Aston Villa (2) | 0–3 | Arsenal (1) | Sutton Coldfield |
| 14:00 GMT | | Report | Fleeting 62'; Sanderson 75' (pen.); Grant 90' | Stadium: Central Ground Coles Lane; Attendance: 50 |

| 29 January 2006 | Barnet (3) | 2–3 | Liverpool (2) |
| | Sowden | Report | Hastie; Edwards; Hart 85' | Attendance: 150 |

| 29 January 2006 | Brighton & Hove Albion (2) | 1–2 | Bristol Academy (1) |
| | Tregear 75' | Report | K. Ward; Jones |

| 29 January 2006 | Fulham (1) | 0–3 | Charlton Athletic (1) |
| | | Report | Bertelli 50'; Barr 66'; Potter 78' |

| 29 January 2006 | Leeds United (1) | 3–1 | Everton (1) | Garforth |
| | Walker 28', 54', 82' | Report | McCann 90' | Stadium: Wheatley Park; Attendance: 110 |

| 29 January 2006 | Newcastle United (2) | 2–0 | Curzon Ashton (2) |
| | Ridley 46'; Newton 85' | Report |

| 29 January 2006 | Stockport County (2) | 0–2 | Birmingham City (1) |
| | | Report | Ballard 57'; Maggs 69' | Attendance: 58 |

| 29 January 2006 | Watford (2) | 0–1 (a.e.t.) | Chelsea (1) |
| | | Report | Owen 118' |

== Quarter–finals ==
All games were played on 12 and 19 February 2006.

| 12 February 2006 | Birmingham City (1) | 1–3 | Leeds United (1) | Redditch |
| | Lacey | Report | Burke; Walker; S. Smith | Stadium: Valley Stadium |

| 12 February 2006 | Bristol Academy (1) | 0–5 | Charlton Athletic (1) | Mangotsfield |
| | | Report | Bertelli 32'; Potter 41'; Aluko 53'; Snare; Pond 77' | Stadium: Cossham Street; Referee: Sian Massey (Coventry) |

| 12 February 2006 | Newcastle United (2) | 2–2 (a.e.t.) (8–9 p) | Liverpool (2) | Woolsington |
| | Goal | Report | Goal | Stadium: Druid Park; Referee: R. Joyce |
| | Penalties |
| | Penalty scored Penalty missed | | Penalty scored |

| 19 February 2006 | Chelsea (1) | 1–6 | Arsenal (1) | Hampton |
| | Perry 41' | Report | Yankey 5'; Sanderson 31'; K. Smith 40', 60'; Fleeting 78', 79' | Stadium: Beveree Stadium |

== Semi–finals ==
All games were played on 19 March 2006.

| 19 March 2006 | Arsenal (1) | 2–1 (a.e.t.) | Charlton Athletic (1) | Bishop's Stortford |
| 15:00 GMT | Fleeting 70'; Ludlow 120+2' | Report | Aluko 74' | Stadium: Woodside Park; Attendance: 1,095; Referee: Ian Crouch |

| 19 March 2006 | Leeds United (1) | 2–0 | Liverpool (2) | Guiseley |
| | S. Smith 23', 60' | Report | | Stadium: Nethermoor Park; Attendance: 1,050; Referee: Jeff Smith (East Riding) |

== Final ==
1 May 2006
13:00 BST

| Arsenal | 5–0 | Leeds United |
|---|---|---|
| L. Ward 3' (o.g.); Fleeting 34'; Yankey 35'; K. Smith 73' (pen.); Sanderson 77' | Report |

The Den, London
Attendance: 13,452
Referee: Phil Crossley (Kent)
