= Nicole Emmanuel =

English footballer

Personal information
- Date of birth: 4 June 1986 (age 40)
- Place of birth: England
- Position: Right-back

Youth career
- Arsenal

Senior career*
Years	Team	Apps	(Gls)
2003–2009	Leeds Carnegie		
2009–2011	Blackburn Rovers Ladies		

International career
2004–2005	England U19		
2008	England U23		
- * Club domestic league appearances and goals as of 14:57, 17 February 2019 (UTC)~

Nicole Emmanuel (born 4 June 1986) is an English former football right-back. She played for Blackburn Rovers Ladies, having previously played in the FA Women's Premier League for Leeds Carnegie. She hails from Milton Keynes.

== Club career ==
Emmanuel was a junior with Arsenal Ladies. She joined Leeds Carnegie in the 2003 close-season and became a regular in the Leeds side. She played in the 2006 Women's FA Cup Final (a 5–0 defeat against Arsenal) and in the 2007 Women's FA Premier League Cup, before suffering a cruciate ligament injury. Despite still recovering from the injury, she joined Blackburn Rovers Ladies in August 2009.

== University playing career ==
Emmanuel attended Loughborough University while playing for Leeds, playing in the university side that retained the BUSA Championship in May 2007, with Emmanuel scoring the opening goal. In July 2007 she was selected for the Great Britain Women's Football Squad for the World University Games in Bangkok. She appeared as a substitute (for Shelly Cox) in Great Britain's opening match, a 1–0 defeat against China. She started the final group game, a 6–2 win against South Africa, although was substituted by Dunia Susi early in the second half.

== International career ==
Emmanuel has represented England at youth level. In September 2004, she was selected for England's Under-19 squad for the UEFA Under-19 Women's Championship First Qualifying Stage, starting the opening game, a 4–0 win against Moldova. In July 2005 she started the Euro Under-19 Championship Finals games against Scotland and Russia. In February 2008, Emmanuel played for the England Under-23 side against Germany.

== Personal life ==
Emmanuel's parents have both been involved with football teams, her mother with Berhamstead Ladies and her father with Watford and Harrow. As well as playing football, Emmanuel is also a qualified referee for Bedfordshire County FA.

== Statistics ==
To 28 October 2009

Club	Season	League		WFA Cup		Premier League Cup		County Cup		Other		Total	
Club	Season	Apps	Goals	Apps	Goals	Apps	Goals	Apps	Goals	Apps	Goals	Apps	Goals
Leeds Carnegie	2003–04		1										
Leeds Carnegie	2004–05		0										
Leeds Carnegie	2005–06												
Leeds Carnegie	2006–07												
Leeds Carnegie	2007–08												
Leeds Carnegie	2008–09												
Blackburn Rovers Ladies	2009–10	0	0	0	0	0	0	0	0	0	0	0	0
Blackburn Rovers Ladies	Club Total	0	0	0	0	0	0	0	0	0	0	0	0
