= Cori Daniels =

English footballer

Personal information
- Date of birth: 4 May 1986 (age 40)
- Position: Defender

Senior career*
Years	Team	Apps	(Gls)
- Charlton Athletic
- * Club domestic league appearances and goals

Cori Daniels is a retired English footballer. She made her debut at 14 years of age for Charlton Athletic and went on to play for Arsenal and Watford. Since retiring from professional football, Daniels has become the assistant coach of London City Lionesses.
