= Rachel Yankey =

English footballer (born 1979)

Rachel Yankey OBE
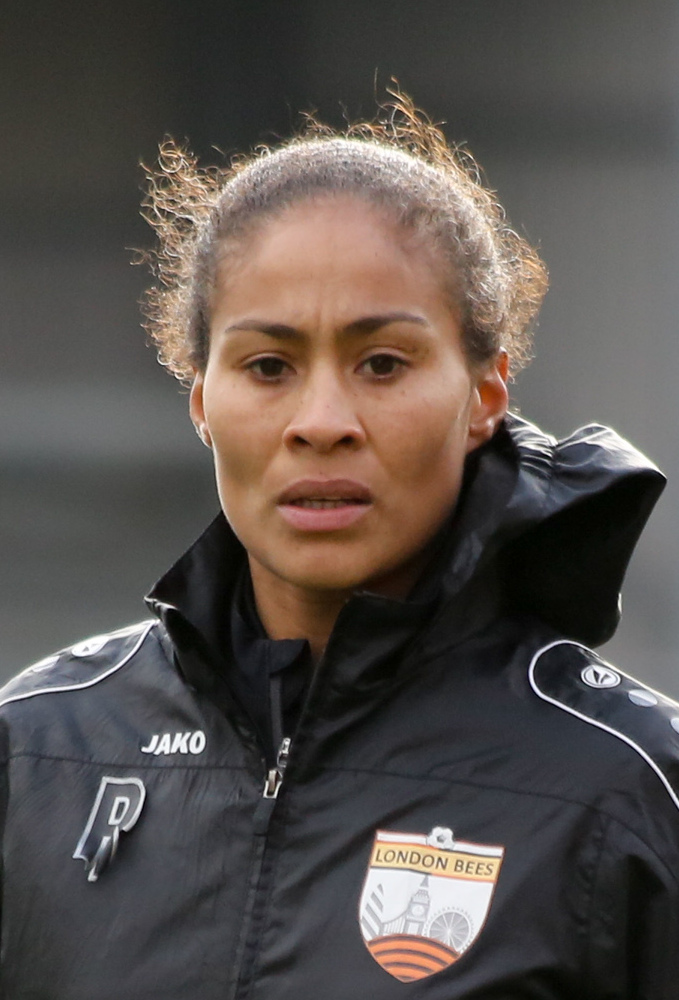
- Yankey in 2019

Personal information
- Full name: Rachel Aba Yankey
- Date of birth: 1 November 1979 (age 47)
- Place of birth: London, England
- Height: 5 ft 4 in (1.63 m)
- Positions: Winger; forward

Youth career
- 1989–1996: Mill Hill United

Senior career*
Years	Team	Apps	(Gls)
1996–2000	Arsenal	47	(8)
2000	→ Laval Dynamites (loan)	25	(10)
2000–2004	Fulham	15	(6)
2004–2005	Birmingham City	13	(7)
2005	New Jersey Wildcats	29	(5)
2005–2016	Arsenal	151	(43)
2016	→ Notts County (loan)	5	(0)
Total		285	(79)

International career
1997–2013	England	129	(19)
2012	Great Britain	5	(0)

Managerial career
- 2019: London Bees
- * Club domestic league appearances and goals

Rachel Aba Yankey OBE (born 1 November 1979) is an English former footballer who played as a winger or forward.

Yankey is best known for her long association with Arsenal Ladies, for whom she played 15 seasons over two separate spells, and is ranked among the Arsenal Ladies Legends. She is one of the most decorated players in women's football, winning the FA Women's National Premier League seven times, the FA WSL twice, the FA Women's Cup eleven times, the FA Women's Premier League Cup six times and the UEFA Women's Cup once, while playing for Arsenal and Fulham Ladies.

Since making her debut in 1997, Yankey appeared on 129 occasions for the England national team and at the time became the most capped player ever to play for England, ahead of male goalkeeper Peter Shilton with 125 (though this record has since been beaten by several female players). She was the second English female player, after Gillian Coultard, to make a century of international appearances. Yankey was part of the Great Britain squad for the 2012 London Olympics.

From 2015 she hosted a CBeebies programme, Footy Pups. The programme ran for 2 series of thirty 15-minute episodes and was nominated for the 2017 Broadcast Award 'Best Children's Programme'.

== Early life ==
Yankey grew up in west London with a white English mother; her Ghanaian father did not live with them. She began playing football as the only girl in a boys' team. Aged eight, she shaved her hair off, pretending to be a boy called "Ray" (an acronym of her birth names). Yankey was able to play in the boys' team for two years before her real identity was discovered.

Yankey joined Mill Hill United at youth level after the club's manager, Russell Mountford, attended an annual general meeting (AGM) at Yankey's boys' club. She also represented Brent in the London Youth Games as a youngster, and was inducted into their Hall of Fame in 2011.

== Club career ==
Yankey's senior playing career began at the age of 16, playing for Arsenal, when she spent a short time on loan with Laval Dynamites, a Canadian team, and then moved to Fulham in 2000. It was here that she was registered as the first professional female footballer in England.

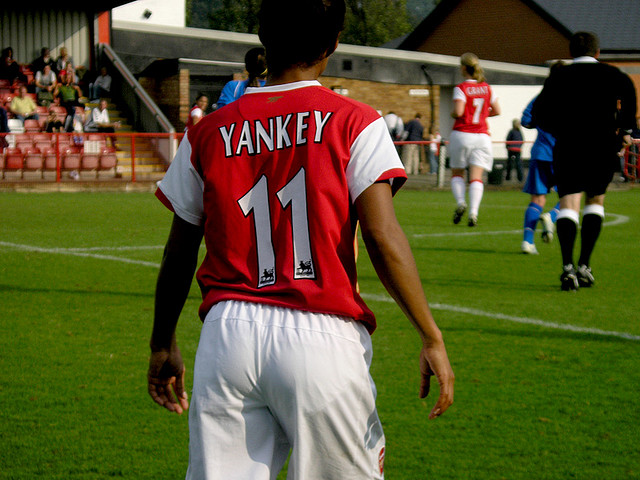
Yankey playing for Arsenal in 2006

She joined Birmingham City before the 2004–05 season, and then had a short spell with the New Jersey Wildcats of the W-League in the United States. Yankey, along with England teammate Rachel Unitt, played for the Wildcats for the last seven games of the season, and helped them win the W-League championship.

=== Arsenal ===
Yankey rejoined Arsenal for the 2005–06 season. In 2006-7 she was part of the "Invincibles" squad who made a clean sweep of all domestic competitions, and she scored several goals in the victorious Champions League campaign. The team continued unbeaten until 2009, and in 2011, Yankey helped Arsenal to another domestic treble.

In January 2014, Yankey signed a new two-year contract with Arsenal. She was praised by the club's general manager, Vic Akers: "She remains a key part of the team and her ability and experience will be invaluable in the season ahead." In December 2016, 37 year-old Yankey was released by Arsenal at the end of her contract.

Yankey is considered an Arsenal legend and is featured in two of the Emirates stadium exterior murals, "Invincibles" and "Future Brilliance".

== International career ==
In August 1997, Yankey made her senior England debut, scoring in a 4–0 win over Scotland at Almondvale Stadium.

Yankey became arguably the most famous female footballer in England, having modelled new England kits, and appeared on the FA women's homepage header. She is also noted for appearing in the BBC's online BBC Sport 'Academy Masterclasses' mini-series, teaching young footballers basic soccer skills.

Yankey appeared at the 2007 World Cup, having played an important part in the qualifying campaign. She came on as a half-time substitute in the quarter-final defeat to the United States.

In May 2009, Yankey was one of the first 17 female players to be given central contracts by The Football Association. However, in August 2009 she was surprisingly left out of coach Hope Powell's 22–player squad for Euro 2009 with Powell believing that her form did not justify a call–up. Yankey was also overlooked for the World Cup qualifiers against Malta and Turkey. But after a return to form with Arsenal Ladies, she was recalled by Powell for the 2010 Cyprus Cup, and won her 90th and 91st caps – as a 76th-minute substitute for Jessica Clarke in a 1–0 win over South Africa and as a starter in a 1–0 defeat to Canada.

Yankey was thereafter selected regularly again by Powell, and on 29 July 2010, Yankey became the second Englishwoman after Gillian Coultard to earn 100 caps during a home World Cup qualifier against Turkey. Yankey, who was captain for the night, scored a goal and played the entire 90 minutes as England won 3–0.

In a World Cup warm–up friendly against the United States, Yankey hit the second goal in England's 2–1 win at Brisbane Road. At the 2011 World Cup, Yankey netted in England's 2–0 group B win over Japan after coming on as a half–time substitute.

In June 2012, Yankey equalled Coultard's record of 119 appearances for England in a 4–0 win in Slovenia. She set a new record of 120 caps by playing in England's 3–0 win over Croatia at Bescot Stadium on 19 September 2012. In June 2013 Yankey played in a 1–1 friendly draw with Japan and broke Peter Shilton's all-time national record of 125 caps. She was included in the England squad which performed poorly at UEFA Women's Euro 2013 and was eliminated in the first round.

Incoming England manager Mark Sampson left Yankey out of his first squad in December 2013. He stressed that "the door is firmly open" for her to come back in.

She was allotted 126 when the FA announced their legacy numbers scheme to honour the 50th anniversary of England's inaugural international.

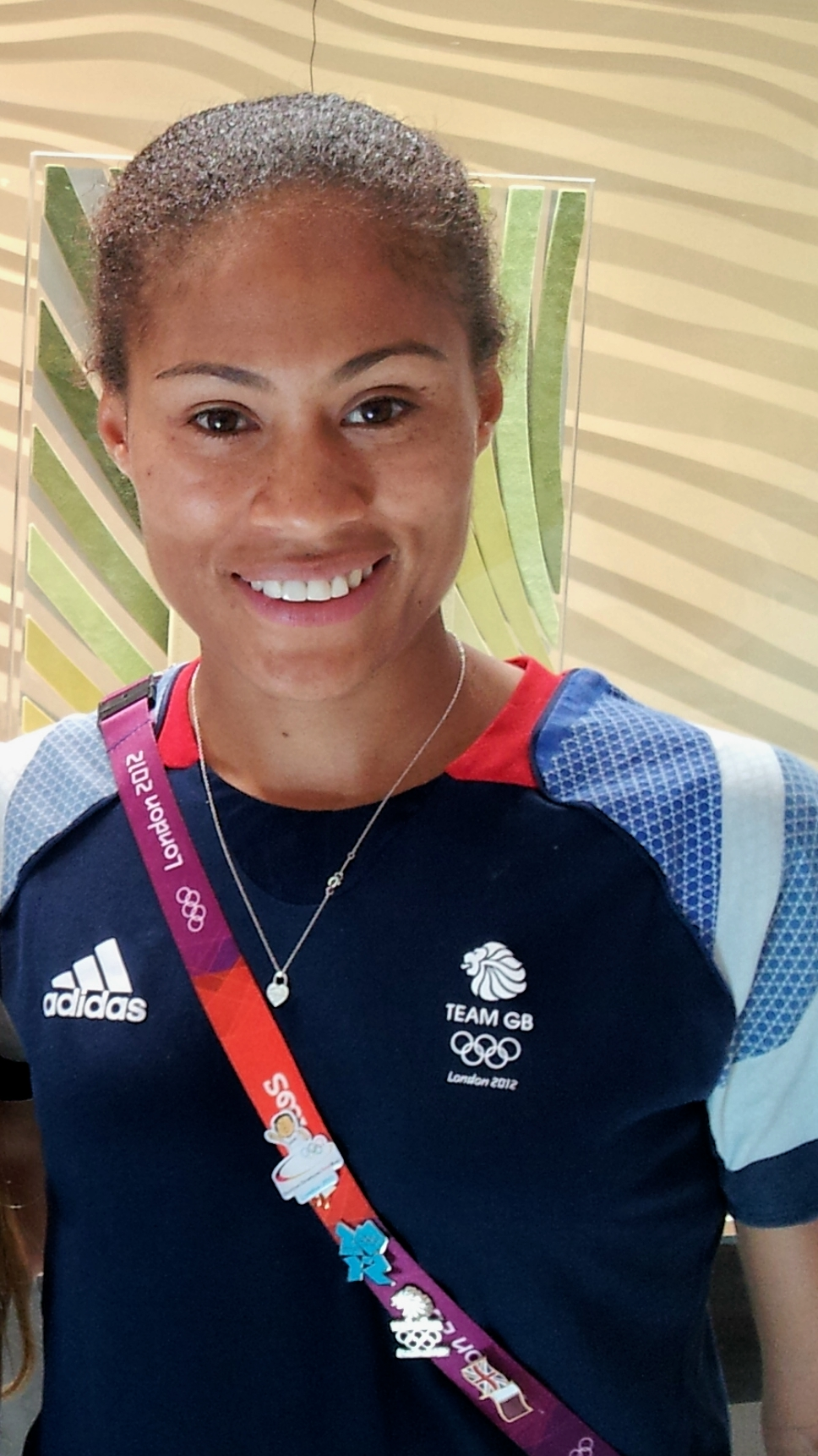
Yankey at the 2012 London Summer Olympics

In June 2012, Yankey was named as one of only 18 players in the first-ever women's Great Britain Olympic squad for the 2012 London Games. She played in all 4 matches before GB was knocked out at the quarter-final stage.

== Post-playing career ==
Yankey was announced as a first team coach of London Bees in June 2018. Following the departure of Luke Swindlehurst in February 2019 to become head coach of Barnet's under-18s team, Yankey was appointed Head Coach. She left the club in May 2019.

Yankey has long run her own coaching business, teaching in schools throughout her career. In June 2025 she launched The Rachel Yankey Foundation, to provide young girls with affordable-to-play hubs in the local community, creating a safe space where they can learn to play and enjoy football.

Yankey has also worked as a football pundit since the 2015 World Cup.

== Personal life ==
Yankey has two children.

It was misreported that Yankey's middle name came about as her mother was a fan of ABBA, the Swedish pop group. However, Yankey indicated that it was actually related to her Ghanaian heritage.

== Career statistics ==
Scores and results list England's goal tally first, score column indicates score after each Yankey goal.

List of international goals scored by Rachel Yankey
No.	Date	Venue	Opponent	Score	Result	Competition
1	24 August 1997	Almondvale Stadium, Livingston, Scotland	Scotland		4–0	Friendly
2	13 September 1998	Câmpina, Romania	Romania		4–1	1999 FIFA Women's World Cup qualification
3	28 November 2000	Brisbane Road, London, England	Ukraine		2–0	2001 UEFA Women's Championship qualification
4	27 September 2001	Auestadion, Kassel, Germany	Germany		1–3	2003 FIFA World Cup qualification
5	4 September 2003	Turf Moor, Burnley, England	Australia		1–0	Friendly
6	9 March 2005	Faro, Portugal	Portugal		4–0	Algarve Cup
7	9 March 2005	Faro, Portugal	Portugal		4–0	Algarve Cup
8	13 March 2005	Estádio Fernando Cabrita, Lagos, Portugal	Mexico		5–0	Algarve Cup
9	27 October 2005	Tapolca, Hungary	Hungary		13–0	2007 FIFA World Cup qualification
10	31 August 2006	The Valley, London, England	Netherlands		4–0	2007 FIFA World Cup qualification
11	8 March 2007	National Hockey Stadium, Milton Keynes, England	Russia		6–0	Friendly
12	17 May 2007	Roots Hall, Southend, England	Iceland		4–0	Friendly
13	11 February 2009	Larnaca, Cyprus	Finland		4–1	Friendly
14	29 July 2010	Bescot Stadium, Walsall, England	Turkey		3–0	2011 FIFA World Cup qualification
15	2 April 2011	Brisbane Road, London, England	United States		2–1	Friendly
16	5 July 2011	Impuls Arena, Augsburg, Germany	Japan		2–0	2011 FIFA Women's World Cup
17	17 September 2011	Omladinski Stadium, Belgrade, Serbia	Serbia		2–2	UEFA Women's Euro 2013 qualifying
18	22 September 2011	County Ground, Swindon, England	Slovenia		4–0	UEFA Women's Euro 2013 qualifying
19	17 June 2012	Salford City Stadium, England	Netherlands		1–0	UEFA Women's Euro 2013 qualifying
20	13 March 2013	GSZ Stadium, Larnaca, Cyprus	Canada		1–0	2013 Cyprus Cup Final

== Honours ==
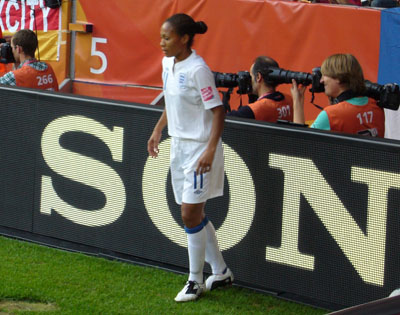
Yankey in the 2011 FIFA Women's World Cup

Arsenal

- FA Women's National Premier League (6): 1996–97, 2005–06, 2006–07, 2007–08, 2008–09, 2009–10
- FA Women's Cup (9): 1998, 1999, 2006, 2007, 2008, 2009, 2011, 2013, 2014
- FA Women's Premier League Cup: 1998, 1999, 2007, 2009
- UEFA Women's Cup: 2007
- FA WSL: 2011, 2012

Fulham

- FA Women's National Premier League: 2002–03
- FA Women's Cup: 2002, 2003
- FA Women's Premier League Cup: 2002, 2003

New Jersey Wildcats

- W-League: 2005

Individual

- Nationwide International Player of the Year (2004–05) season
- London Youth Games Hall of Famer (Class of 2011)
- Women's Super League Hall of Fame: 2021

Yankey was appointed Member of the Order of the British Empire (MBE) in the 2006 New Year Honours and Officer of the Order of the British Empire (OBE) in the 2014 New Year Honours, both for services to football.
