= Bristol City W.F.C. (1990s) =

Bristol City W.F.C. was a women's association football club based in Bristol in the 1990s and 2000s. The club was affiliated to Bristol City F.C. and played in the South West Combination, FA Women's Premier League Southern Division, and FA Women's Premier League National Division.

== History ==
The first women's team to represent Bristol City were not actually part of the football club, but were actually an independent team, Bristol United, with no affiliation to Bristol City. In 1990 they were invited to represent City by wearing red kits and using the club's name. Four years later, City began work developing their own women's football section when fathers Roger Bowyer and Andy Baylis, began entering girls' teams in local 6-a-side leagues. From these beginnings a senior women's team grew, and worked their way up the leagues. They won the South-West Combination in the 2001–02 season, winning promotion to the FA Women's Premier League Southern Division.

It took them just two seasons in the Southern Division to win promotion to the FA Women's Premier League National Division, finishing the 2003–04 season with a record of 18 wins, three draws and three defeats to top the Southern table. Promotion meant they would now play in the top flight of English women's football, where they would join local rivals Bristol Rovers in the National Division.

City found life at the top of the women's game difficult, and their stay in the National Division lasted for just a single season. They ended the 2004–05 campaign with just 9 points and were relegated straight back down to the Southern Division. Two years later, in May 2007, Bristol City announced that they would no longer fund a women's team. The club moved to Bath and became part of the TeamBath group of sports teams.

The name Bristol City returned to women's football in 2016, however. In a strange twist City took over, and renamed, FA WSL side Bristol Academy. Although they had been renamed in the meantime, academy were the same team that had been City's fierce rivals of the late 90s and early 2000s: Bristol Rovers. It was announced in November 2015 that Academy would become Bristol City W.F.C.
