= Lianne Sanderson =

English footballer (born 1988)

- Sanderson playing for Arsenal Ladies in 2015

Personal information
- Full name: Lianne Joan Sanderson
- Date of birth: 3 February 1988 (age 38)
- Place of birth: Lewisham, England
- Height: 5 ft 8 in (1.72 m)
- Position: Forward

Youth career
- 1997–2003: Arsenal

Senior career*
Years	Team	Apps	(Gls)
2003–2008	Arsenal		
2008–2010	Chelsea	26	(20)
2010–2011	Philadelphia Independence	40	(8)
2011–2012	Espanyol	23	(8)
2012	D.C. United	7	(6)
2013–2014	Boston Breakers	41	(10)
2013	→ Apollon Limassol (loan)		
2015	Arsenal	6	(0)
2015	Portland Thorns	5	(0)
2015	→ Apollon Limassol (loan)		
2016	Orlando Pride	8	(2)
2016	Western New York Flash	9	(3)
2018–2019	Juventus	2	(1)

International career^{‡}
2006–2015	England	50	(15)
Medal record
Women's football
Representing England
FIFA Women's World Cup
Bronze medal – third place	2015 Canada
- * Club domestic league appearances and goals as of 19:30, 8 July 2019 (UTC) ‡ National team caps and goals as of 12:23, 12 June 2017 (UTC+1)

Lianne Joan Sanderson (born 3 February 1988) is a current broadcaster and former English professional footballer who played as a forward. She won 50 caps for the England national team.

At the international level, Sanderson made her debut for England in May 2006. She was part of the England squad at the 2007 FIFA Women's World Cup and UEFA Women's Euro 2009. In August 2010, Sanderson complained of unfair treatment and declared she would not play for England again under then-coach Hope Powell. After Mark Sampson took over as manager in December 2013, she was recalled to the squad and participated at the 2015 FIFA Women's World Cup. She then made further complaints of unfair treatment and was not selected after 2015.

== Early life ==
At the age of six, Sanderson started playing for a boys' team in South London. Her father, Jeff Sanderson, played for Crystal Palace. Sanderson says she begged her father to let her play on a team starting at the age of five years old. At nine years old, Sanderson signed for Arsenal.

== Club career ==
=== Arsenal ===
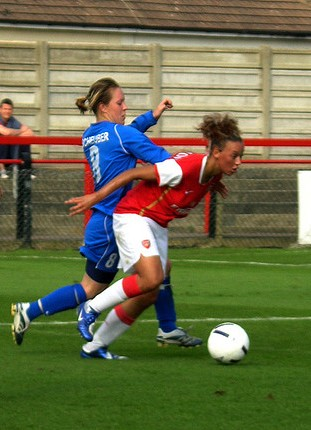
Sanderson tackled by Heather Scheuber of Birmingham City, October 2006

Sanderson joined Arsenal in 1997 as part of their youth programme. Her first full season with the first team came in the 2003–2004 season, and she continued to play in the first team from then on. In the 2006 FA Women's Cup final, Sanderson scored the fifth goal of a 5–0 win over Leeds United, and was voted Player of the Match.

Sanderson finished the 2006–07 season as Arsenal's top–scorer, with 40 goals scored in 41 appearances across four competitions, all of which were won by Arsenal. In the 2007–08 season, she amassed 51 goals in 36 appearances, including the third in Arsenal's 4–1 FA Women's Cup final triumph over Leeds United.

=== Chelsea ===
On 3 July 2008, Sanderson and Arsenal teammate Anita Asante joined Chelsea Ladies. Upon signing, Sanderson said: "I always said I would never play for anyone else other than Chelsea. I have been at Arsenal for 11 years and it is a big change for me to have to leave the team, but both Anita and I wanted a new challenge. Sometimes you have to try new things and challenge yourself personally and I know that is what I am looking forward to doing here. So now I am just looking forward to what's ahead. Hopefully Anita and I will come in and help Chelsea win things." Arsenal manager Vic Akers publicly criticised the players for the manner of their departure: "You think you've the respect of players, and then they do that. It's a sorry state of affairs."

=== Philadelphia Independence ===
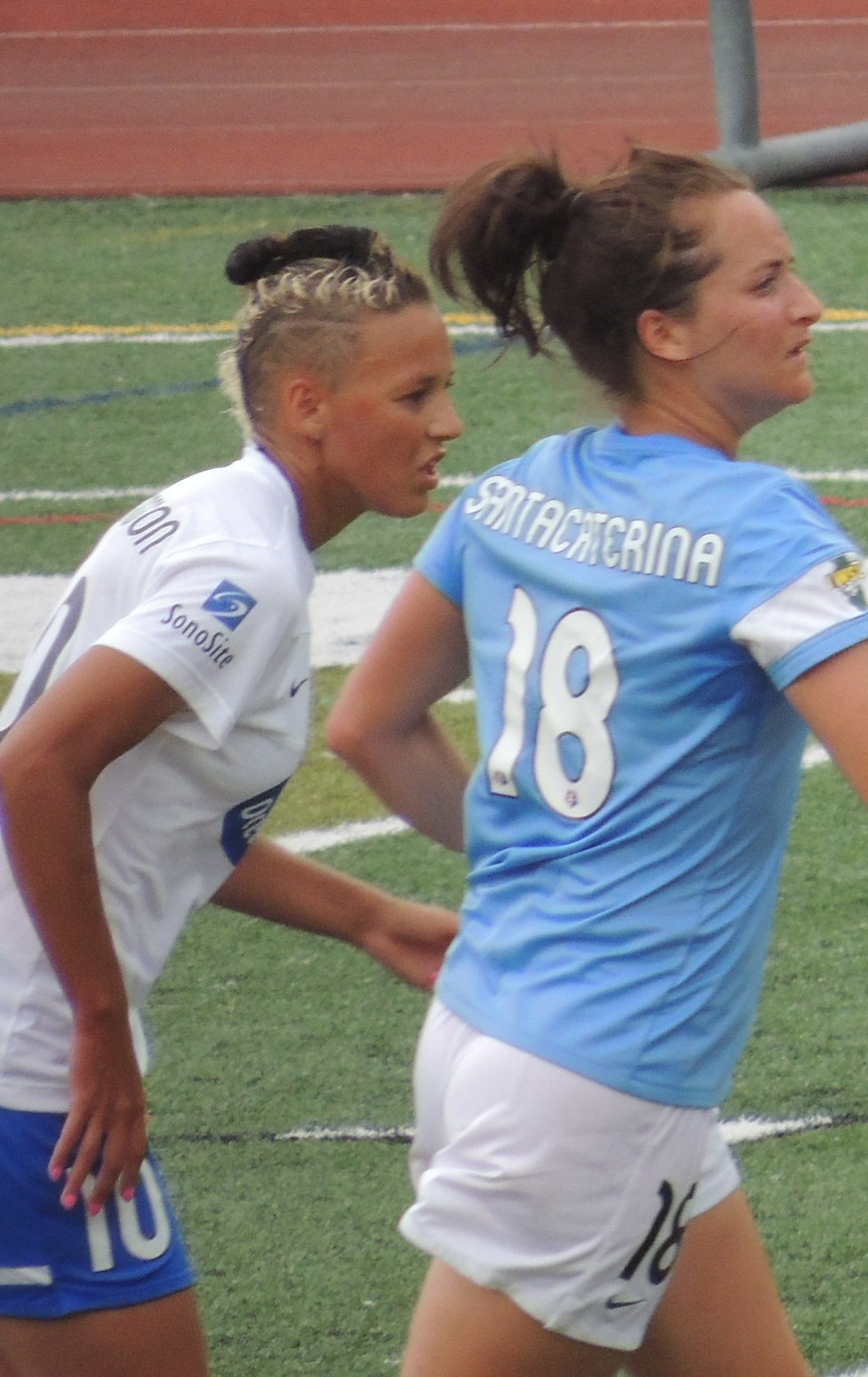
Sanderson with Chicago Red Stars' Jackie Santacaterina in 2013.

Sanderson was drafted in the WPS international draft, and joined Philadelphia Independence. She indicated that a delay in the creation of the FA WSL was behind her move to the United States. In two seasons in the WPS she scored eight goals.

=== Espanyol ===
Following the end of the 2011 WPS season, Sanderson signed for Espanyol, in the Spanish league.

=== D.C. United ===
In May 2012, she joined W-League side D.C. United Women along with Philadelphia Independence and Espanyol teammate, Joanna Lohman.

=== Boston Breakers ===
In 2013, Lianne Sanderson signed with Boston Breakers to play in the new National Women's Soccer League. Sanderson and Lohman went on loan to Cypriot club Apollon Limassol after the American season had finished to play in the UEFA Women's Champions League.

=== Arsenal ===
In November 2014, Sanderson re-signed with her original club, Arsenal Ladies. Her second spell with the club ended on 10 July 2015 after eight months.

=== Portland Thorns FC ===
In August 2015, it was announced that Sanderson would join Portland Thorns FC. She made her debut as a second-half substitute for compatriot Jodie Taylor in a 2–1 victory against the Chicago Red Stars on 9 August 2015. After starting two of five appearances for Portland that season, Sanderson headed out on another off-season loan to Apollon Limassol of Cyprus.

=== Orlando Pride ===
The expansion Orlando Pride selected Sanderson with the 7th pick of the 2015 NWSL Expansion Draft, joining Alex Morgan and Kaylyn Kyle as fellow Orlando acquisitions from Portland. Sanderson was the first player to score a goal at home for the franchise, on a free kick in the 56th minute of the Pride's home opener on 23 April 2016. By the time she was traded away from the Pride before week 10 of the season in June 2016, Sanderson had two goals and an assist, tying Morgan on both counts despite playing half as many minutes and attempting 22 fewer shots.

=== Western New York Flash ===
In June 2016, Sanderson was traded from the Orlando Pride to the Western New York Flash in exchange for an international spot through 2018. The Flash won the NWSL Championship in 2016. However, Sanderson's season ended when she tore the ACL and meniscus in her right knee on 17 September, while playing for the Flash in a friendly against Thailand.

Since the team was relocated to North Carolina, she has not participated in any team practices or training camps, possibly taking the time to continue to rehab her injury. She was not listed on any of the pre-season roster cuts for the North Carolina Courage 2017 season and social media accounts reflect that she is residing in Limassol, Cyprus and may be involved in coaching and training activities with her previous club, Apollon Limassol.

=== Juventus ===
In July 2018, Sanderson joined Juventus. After one season, in which she made two league appearances as Juventus won the Serie A title and the Coppa Italia, she left the club.

=== Retirement ===
Sanderson subsequently retired from professional football and pursued a career in media, becoming an analyst and commentator for many platforms.

== International career ==
Sanderson has played for England at the Under-15, 17, 19 and 21 levels. On 3 May 2006, she was called up for the England first team. She hit the crossbar with a shot from 25 yards, shortly after coming off the bench for her debut against Hungary on 11 May 2006. She was drafted into the squad for the World Cup qualifying play-off against France in September 2006 as a replacement for the injured Jo Potter.

She scored her first senior goal in England's 4–0 Euro 2009 qualifier win against Northern Ireland on 13 May 2007. It was her fifth cap.

On 16 August 2010, Sanderson announced that she no longer wanted to be considered for England duty while manager Hope Powell was in charge, due to perceived unfair treatment by both the England hierarchy and Powell.

Sanderson was not included in the England squad for the 2011 FIFA Women's World Cup or the Great Britain squad for the 2012 London Olympics, which was also selected by Powell. Sanderson continued to publicly criticise Powell's administration: "I felt the [England set-up] wanted people like robots who would literally do everything they asked you to do."

After England's unexpectedly poor performance at UEFA Women's Euro 2013, Powell was sacked by The Football Association (FA). A report in The Guardian newspaper suggested that "the wheels first began to come off" when Sanderson left the team. When Katie Chapman withdrew from selection in 2011 after a dispute with disciplinarian Powell, England had lost two talented players, both to off-field issues.

Sanderson rejoined the England squad under Mark Sampson, scoring the winning goal as England won the 2015 Cyprus Cup and winning the penalty that achieved England third place at the 2015 FIFA Women's World Cup. Shortly afterwards, she began complaining again about being expected to "conform" by the FA and about not getting enough acclaim for her 50th cap.

In November 2022, Sanderson was recognized by The Football Association as one of the England national team's legacy players, and as the 162nd women's player to be capped by England.

=== International goals ===
Scores and results list England's goal tally first

Goal	Date	Venue	Opponent	Score	Result	Competition
1	13 May 2007	Priestfield Stadium, Gillingham	Northern Ireland	4–0	4–0	2009 UEFA Championship qualification
2	8 May 2008	Darida, Minsk	Belarus	4–0	6–1	2009 UEFA Championship qualification
3	9 February 2009	Alpha Sports Centre, Larnaca	Finland	2–0	2–2	Friendly
4	5 March 2009	GSZ Stadium, Larnaca	South Africa	2–0	6–0	2009 Cyprus Cup
5	12 March 2009	GSP Stadium, Nicosia	Canada	1–1	3–1	2009 Cyprus Cup
6	26 November 2009	Buca Arena, İzmir	Turkey	2–0	3–0	2011 FIFA World Cup qualification
7	1 March 2010	GSP Stadium, Nicosia	Switzerland	2–1	2–2	2010 Cyprus Cup
8	22 March 2010	Loftus Road, London	Austria	1–0	3–0	2011 FIFA World Cup qualification
9	10 March 2014	GSP Stadium, Nicosia	Canada	1–0	2–0	2014 Cyprus Cup
10	10 March 2014	GSP Stadium, Nicosia	Canada	2–0	2–0	2014 Cyprus Cup
11	5 April 2014	Falmer Stadium, Brighton and Hove	Montenegro	6–0	9–0	2015 FIFA World Cup qualification
12	2 August 2014	Victoria Park, Hartlepool	Sweden	3–0	4–0	Friendly
13	21 August 2014	Cardiff City Stadium, Cardiff	Wales	4–0	4–0	2015 FIFA World Cup qualification
14	4 March 2015	GSZ Stadium, Larnaca	Finland	1–0	3–1	2015 Cyprus Cup
15	11 March 2015	GSZ Stadium, Larnaca	Canada	1–0	1–0	2015 Cyprus Cup

== Honours ==
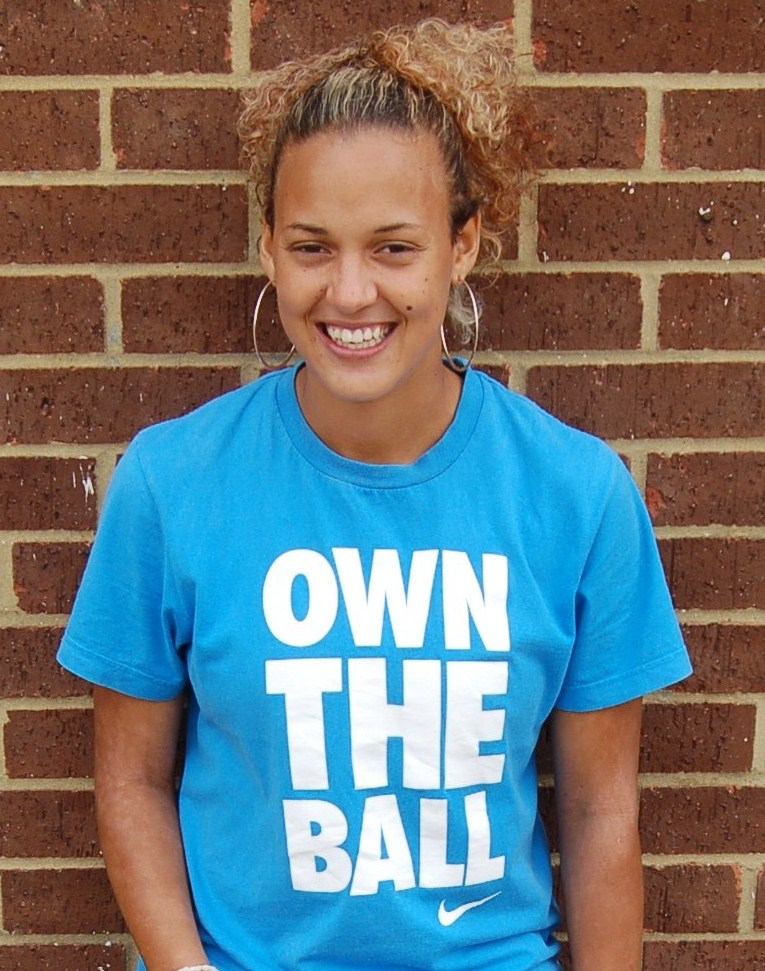
Sanderson in 2009

Arsenal

- FA Women's Premier League National Division: 2003–04, 2004–05, 2005–06, 2006–07, 2007–08
- FA Women's Cup: 2003–04, 2005–06, 2006–07, 2007–08
- FA Women's Premier League Cup: 2004–05, 2006–07
- FA Women's Community Shield: 2004–05, 2005–06
- UEFA Women's Cup: 2006–07

Juventus

- Serie A: 2018–19
- Coppa Italia: 2018–19

England

- UEFA Women's Championship runner-up: 2009
- Cyprus Cup: 2009, 2015
- FIFA Women's World Cup third place: 2015

== Personal life ==
Sanderson is openly gay. In 2014, she was engaged to then-teammate Joanna Lohman, but the two later broke up. Sanderson embarked on a relationship with another teammate, Ashley Nick, when they were housed in shared accommodation provided by Apollon Limassol. "We just fell in love organically, with no drama involved," Sanderson claimed. She is a lifelong supporter of Manchester United.

Since her retirement, Sanderson has become a pundit, and can often be heard on talkSPORT. She was a co-commentator for Fox Sports in the United States during the Women's Euro 2025 tournament.
