= England women's national football team all-time record =

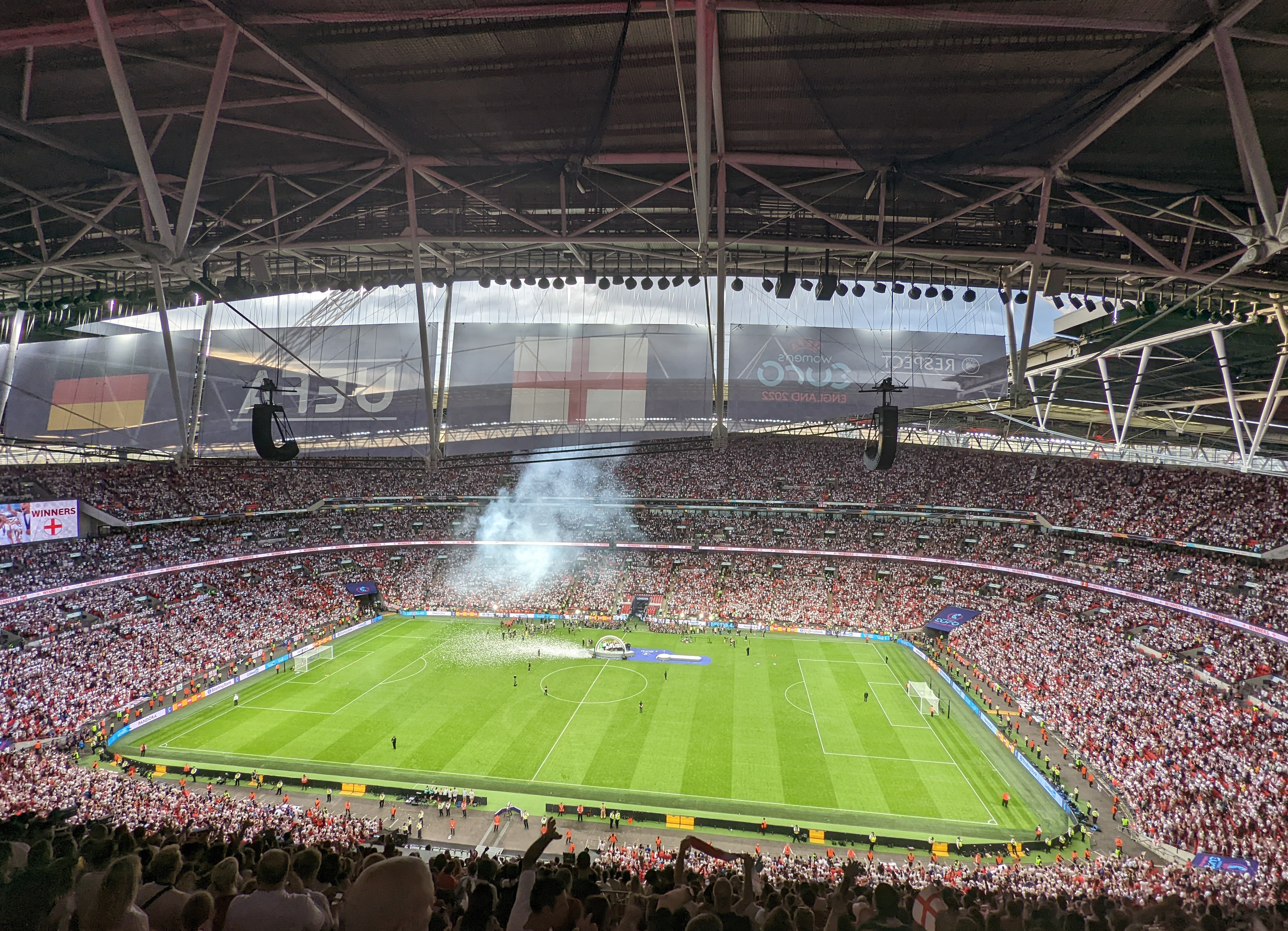
England won the UEFA Women's Euro 2022 final against Germany.

The following tables show the England women's national football team's all-time international record. The statistics are composed of FIFA Women's World Cup and UEFA Women's Championship matches, as well as numerous international friendly tournaments and matches. (Note: The list does not include matches contested at the Olympic Games. This is because England is a constituent country of the United Kingdom, and is not a member of the International Olympic Committee. Therefore, the national team does not compete in the Olympics. Instead, see the Great Britain Olympic football team.)

Following a UEFA recommendation in 1972 for national associations to incorporate the women's game, the Football Association (FA) rescinded its 50-year ban on women playing at English Football League grounds. Shortly after, Eric Worthington was tasked by the Women's Football Association (WFA) to assemble an official women's national team. England competed in its first officially recognised international match against Scotland in Greenock on 18 November 1972, 100 years to the month after the first men's international between the same two nations. England overturned a two-goal deficit to defeat Scotland opponents 3–2, with Sylvia Gore scoring England's first international goal. Prior to this, an English team had played a series of unofficial matches at the 1969 Coppa Europa per Nazioni, and the 1970 and 1971 editions of a "World Championships" held in Italy and Mexico respectively. None of the competitions were sanctioned by FIFA, UEFA, or national associations, and some were contested by club teams acting as de facto national teams.

England have contested 484 matches against 53 different national teams. Of these teams, England have not lost to 31 of them, having earned a perfect 100% winning record against 23 of these teams. West Germany is the only team England has played at least one fixture against and never failed to beat having lost both games against them although England has beaten Germany, the team's successor following the reunification of Germany in 1990.

== Performances ==
Last match updated on 28 October 2025

=== Performance by competition ===
Competition	Played	Won	Drawn	Lost	For	Against	Diff	Win %	Loss %
FIFA Women's World Cup	33	20	5	8	56	34	+22	61%	24%
FIFA Women's World Cup qualification	64	48	7	9	246	30	+216	75%	14%
UEFA Women's Euros	40	20	5	15	78	60	+18	50%	41%
UEFA Women's Euros qualification	86	57	16	13	231	62	+169	66%	15%
UEFA Nations League	12	7	1	4	31	14	+17	58%	33%
UEFA–CONMEBOL Finalissima	1	0	1	0	1	1	0	0%	0%
Competitive total	230	149	33	48	627	194	+433	65%	21%
International friendlies	167	81	26	60	306	217	+89	48%	36%
Minor tournaments	89	44	21	24	155	92	+63	49%	27%
Overall total	495	280	82	133	1104	510	+594	56%	27%

=== Performance by manager ===
Years	Manager	Played	Won	Drawn	Lost	For	Against	Diff	Win %	Loss %
1972	(England) Eric Worthington	1	1	0	0	3	2	+1	100%	0%
1973	(England) John Adams	2	2	0	0	11	0	+11	100%	0%
1973–1979	(England) Tom Tranter	23	15	1	7	61	24	+37	65%	30%
1979	(England) John Sims	4	2	1	1	6	4	+2	50%	25%
1979	(England) Mike Rawding	1	0	1	0	2	2	0	0%	0%
1980–1991	(England) Martin Reagan	71	38	14	19	156	68	+88	54%	27%
1991	(Wales) Barrie Williams	7	3	2	2	11	10	+1	43%	29%
1992	(England) John Bilton	6	4	0	2	11	7	+4	67%	33%
1993–1998	(England) Ted Copeland	35	15	5	15	78	58	+20	43%	43%
1998	(England) Dick Bate	3	0	0	3	3	6	−3	0%	100%
1998–2013	(England) Hope Powell	163	85	32	46	306	197	+109	52%	28%
2006 and 2013	(England) Brent Hills	5	4	0	1	21	5	+16	80%	20%
2013–2017	(Wales) Mark Sampson	59	38	8	13	131	36	+95	64%	22%
2017–2018	(England) Mo Marley	3	2	0	1	9	1	+8	67%	33%
2018–2021	(England) Phil Neville	35	19	5	11	60	33	+27	54%	31%
2021	(Norway) Hege Riise	3	1	0	2	7	5	+2	33%	67%
2021–present	(Netherlands) Sarina Wiegman	72	49	13	10	208	43	+165	70%	13%
Total		493	278	82	133	1084	501	+583	56%	27%

== Competition records ==
=== FIFA Women's World Cup ===
FIFA Women's World Cup finals record										Qualification record						Manager(s)
Year	Round	Pos	Pld	W	D*	L	GF	GA	Squad	Pld	W	D	L	GF	GA	Manager(s)
(China) 1991	Did not qualify									UEFA Women's Euro 1991						Reagan
(Sweden) 1995	Quarter-finals	7th	4	2	0	2	6	9	Squad	UEFA Women's Euro 1995						Copeland
(United States) 1999	Did not qualify									8	3	0	5	9	12	Copeland, Bate, Powell
(United States) 2003	Did not qualify									10	3	3	4	12	10	Powell
(China) 2007	Quarter-finals	7th	4	1	2	1	8	6	Squad	8	6	2	0	29	2	Powell
(Germany) 2011	Quarter-finals	7th	4	2	2	0	6	3	Squad	10	9	1	0	35	4	Powell
(Canada) 2015	Third place	3rd	7	5	0	2	10	7	Squad	10	10	0	0	52	1	Hills, Sampson
(France) 2019	Fourth place	4th	7	5	0	2	13	5	Squad	8	7	1	0	29	1	Sampson, Marley, Neville
(Australia) (New Zealand) 2023	Runners-up	2nd	7	5	1	1	13	4	Squad	10	10	0	0	80	0	Wiegman
(Brazil) 2027	To be determined									To be determined						
(Mexico) (United States) 2031	To be determined									To be determined						
(England) (Northern Ireland) (Scotland) (Wales) 2035	Qualified									Qualified as co-host						
Total	0 titles	6/9	33	20	5	8	56	34	—	63	47	7	9	236	30	—
Champions Runners-up Third place Fourth place *Draws include knockout matches decided on penalty kicks. **Red border colour indicates tournament was held on home soil. ***Prior to the introduction of a UEFA qualifying tournament for the 1999 FIFA Women's World Cup, the 1991 and 1995 UEFA Women's European Championships also served as UEFA's qualifying tournament for the first two World Cups.

=== UEFA Women's European Championship ===
UEFA Women's European Championship finals record										Qualification record										Manager(s)
Year	Round	Pos	Pld	W	D*	L	GF	GA	Squad	Gp	Pos	Pld	W	D	L	GF	GA	P/R	Rnk	Manager(s)
(England) (Italy) (Denmark) (Sweden) 1984	Runners-up	2nd	4	3	0	1	4	2	Squad	2	1st	6	6	0	0	24	1	–		Reagan
(Norway) 1987	Fourth place	4th	2	0	0	2	3	5	Squad	2	1st	6	6	0	0	34	2	–		Reagan
(West Germany) 1989	Did not qualify									1	3rd	6	2	1	3	6	10	–		Reagan
(Denmark) 1991	Did not qualify									3	2nd	8	2	3	3	5	8	–		Reagan
(Italy) 1993	Did not qualify									3	1st	6	4	0	2	11	7	–		Bilton
(England) (Germany) (Norway) (Sweden) 1995	Semi-finals	3rd	2	0	0	2	2	6	Squad	7	1st	8	6	2	0	33	2	–		Copeland
(Norway) (Sweden) 1997	Did not qualify									3	2nd	8	4	2	2	19	6	–		Copeland
(Germany) 2001	Group stage	8th	3	0	1	2	1	8	Squad	2	2nd	8	5	1	2	12	14	–		Powell
(England) 2005	Group stage	7th	3	1	0	2	4	5	Squad	Qualified as hosts										Powell
(Finland) 2009	Runners-up	2nd	6	3	1	2	12	14	Squad	1	1st	8	6	2	0	24	4	–		Powell
(Sweden) 2013	Group stage	12th	3	0	1	2	3	7	Squad	6	1st	8	6	2	0	22	2	–		Powell
(Netherlands) 2017	Semi-finals	3rd	5	4	0	1	11	4	Squad	7	1st	8	7	1	0	32	1	–		Sampson
(England) 2022	Winners	1st	6	6	0	0	22	2	Squad	Qualified as hosts										Wiegman
(Switzerland) 2025	Winners	1st	6	3	2	1	16	7	Squad	A3 (Note: From Euro 2025 onwards a new qualifying format was introduced, linked to the Women's Nations League. Teams are divided into leagues (A–C) and groups (1–5) within each league with promotion/relegation between the leagues at the end of each cycle.)	2nd	6	3	2	1	8	5	Same position	7th	Wiegman
Total	2 titles		40	20	5	15	78	60	—	—	—	86	57	16	13	231	62	—	—	—
Champions Runners-up Third place Fourth place *Draws include knockout matches decided on penalty kicks. **Red border colour indicates tournament was held on home soil. ***Third place includes all tournaments where England reached the semi-finals after Euro 1993 as the third place play-offs were not played in subsequent editions of the tournament.

=== UEFA Women's Nations League ===
UEFA Nations League league phase record												Finals record									Manager(s)
Season	LG	GP	Pos	Pld	W	D	L	GF	GA	P/R	RK	Year	Pos	Pld	W	D*	L	GF	GA	Squad	Manager(s)
2023–24	A	1	2nd	6	4	0	2	15	8	Same position	5th	(France) (Netherlands) (Spain) 2024	Did not qualify								Wiegman
2025	A	3	2nd	6	3	1	2	16	6	Same position	TBD	2025	Did not qualify								Wiegman
Total				12	7	1	4	31	14	—		0/2	0 titles	0	0	0	0	0	0	—	—
Champions Runners-up Third place Fourth place *Draws include knockout matches decided on penalty kicks. **Group stage played home and away. Flag shown represents host nation(s) for finals stage matches.

=== Minor tournaments ===
Year	Round	Position	GP	W	D*	L	GF	GA
(Italy) 1969 Unofficial European Championship	Third place	3rd	2	1	0	1	5	4
(England) 1976 Pony Home Championship	Winners, group stage	1st	2	2	0	0	9	1
(Italy) 1979 Unofficial European Championship	Semi-finals	4th	4	2	1	1	6	4
(Japan) 1981 Mundialito	Group stage	3rd	2	1	0	1	4	1
(Italy) 1984 Mundialito	Semi-finals	3rd	4	1	2	1	4	5
(Italy) 1985 Mundialito	Winners	1st	4	2	1	1	7	5
(Italy) 1988 Mundialito	Winners	1st	4	3	1	0	8	2
(France) 1989 Four Nations	Runners-up	2nd	2	1	1	0	2	0
(United States) 1990 North America Cup	Group stage	3rd	3	0	1	2	2	7
(Portugal) 2002 Algarve Cup	Group stage	9th	4	1	0	3	8	12
(Portugal) 2005 Algarve Cup	Group stage	8th	4	3	1	0	13	0
(China) 2007 Four Nations Tournament	Group stage	4th	3	0	2	1	1	3
2009 Cyprus Cup	Winners	1st	4	3	1	0	14	3
2010 Cyprus Cup	Group stage	5th	4	2	1	1	6	5
(South Korea) 2010 Peace Queen Cup	Group stage	2nd	2	0	2	0	0	0
2011 Cyprus Cup	Group stage	5th	4	2	0	2	4	4
2012 Cyprus Cup	Group stage	4th	4	2	0	2	5	7
2013 Cyprus Cup	Winners	1st	4	3	1	0	12	7
2014 Cyprus Cup	Runners-up	2nd	4	3	0	1	7	2
2015 Cyprus Cup	Winners	1st	4	3	1	0	8	2
(China) 2015 Yongchuan International Tournament	Runners-up	2nd	2	1	0	1	2	2
(United States) 2016 SheBelieves Cup	Group stage	3rd	3	0	1	2	1	3
(United States) 2017 SheBelieves Cup	Group stage	3rd	3	1	0	2	2	3
(United States) 2018 SheBelieves Cup	Runners-up	2nd	3	1	1	1	6	4
(United States) 2019 SheBelieves Cup	Winners	1st	3	2	1	0	7	3
(United States) 2020 SheBelieves Cup	Group stage	3rd	3	1	0	2	1	3
(England) 2022 Arnold Clark Cup	Winners	1st	3	1	2	0	4	2
(England) 2023 Arnold Clark Cup	Winners	1st	3	3	0	0	12	2
Total		9 titles	89	44	21	24	155	92

== Head-to-head record ==
Key
Positive balance (more wins)
Neutral balance (wins = losses)
Negative balance (more losses)

Last match updated on 28 October 2025

Opponent	Played	Won	Drawn	Lost	For	Against	Diff	Win %	Loss %	First match	Last match
Argentina	2	2	0	0	7	1	+6	100%	0%	17 September 2007	14 June 2019
Australia	8	5	1	2	12	6	+6	63%	25%	4 September 2003	28 October 2025
Austria	10	10	0	0	32	3	+29	100%	0%	1 September 2005	23 February 2024
Belarus	4	4	0	0	19	1	+18	100%	0%	11 February 2010	11 February 2010
Belgium	18	12	3	3	47	15	+32	67%	17%	31 October 1978	8 April 2025
Bosnia and Herzegovina	4	4	0	0	8	0	+8	100%	0%	29 November 2015	10 April 2018
Brazil	5	2	1	2	6	6	+1	40%	40%	6 October 2018	25 October 2025
Cameroon	1	1	0	0	3	0	+3	100%	0%	23 June 2019	23 June 2019
Canada	15	7	1	7	14	20	−6	47%	47%	6 September 1995	17 February 2022
China	7	3	1	3	17	7	+10	33%	50%	15 March 2005	1 August 2023
Colombia	2	2	0	0	4	2	+2	100%	0%	17 June 2015	12 August 2023
Croatia	4	4	0	0	16	0	+16	100%	0%	19 November 1995	19 September 2012
Czech Republic	5	3	2	0	12	4	+8	60%	0%	26 May 2005	11 October 2022
Denmark	18	9	3	6	21	20	+1	50%	33%	19 May 1979	28 July 2023
Estonia	2	2	0	0	13	0	+13	100%	0%	21 September 2015	15 September 2016
Finland	13	9	4	0	29	13	+16	69%	0%	19 July 1979	4 March 2015
France	28	5	9	14	25	35	−10	18%	50%	22 April 1973	5 July 2025
Germany	27	3	4	20	24	66	−42	11%	74%	25 November 1990	25 October 2024
Haiti	1	1	0	0	1	0	+1	100%	0%	22 July 2023	22 July 2023
Hungary	2	2	0	0	15	0	+15	100%	0%	27 October 2005	11 May 2006
Iceland	10	8	1	1	19	7	+12	80%	10%	17 May 1992	16 July 2009
Italy	34	13	6	15	53	55	−2	38%	44%	2 June 1976	22 July 2025
Jamaica	1	1	0	0	7	0	+7	0%	100%	29 June 2025	29 June 2025
Japan	9	6	2	1	20	5	+15	67%	11%	6 September 1981	11 November 2022
Kazakhstan	2	2	0	0	11	0	+11	100%	0%	28 November 2017	4 September 2018
Latvia	2	2	0	0	30	0	+30	100%	0%	26 October 2021	30 November 2021
Luxembourg	2	2	0	0	20	0	+20	100%	0%	21 September 2021	6 September 2022
Malta	2	2	0	0	14	0	+14	100%	0%	25 October 2009	20 May 2010
Mexico	3	2	1	0	8	2	+6	67%	0%	13 March 2005	13 June 2015
Montenegro	2	2	0	0	19	0	+19	100%	0%	5 April 2014	17 September 2014
Netherlands	24	15	4	5	39	19	+20	63%	21%	9 November 1973	9 July 2025
New Zealand	4	2	1	1	5	3	+2	50%	25%	21 October 2010	1 June 2019
Nigeria	4	1	1	2	3	6	−3	25%	50%	10 June 1995	7 August 2023
Norway	22	6	3	13	25	41	−16	27%	59%	27 May 1990	15 November 2022
Northern Ireland	13	13	0	0	70	3	+67	100%	0%	7 September 1973	15 July 2022
North Macedonia	2	2	0	0	18	0	+18	100%	0%	17 September 2021	8 April 2022
Portugal	12	8	4	0	30	5	+25	67%	0%	11 February 1996	30 May 2025
Republic of Ireland	10	10	0	0	35	2	+33	100%	0%	2 May 1978	12 July 2024
Romania	2	2	0	0	6	2	+4	100%	0%	13 September 1998	11 October 1998
Russia	8	4	3	1	23	9	+14	50%	13%	24 June 2001	8 June 2018
Scotland	28	25	1	2	95	16	+79	89%	7%	18 November 1972	5 December 2023
Serbia	4	3	1	0	18	2	+16	75%	0%	17 September 2011	7 June 2016
Slovenia	4	4	0	0	28	0	+28	100%	0%	25 September 1993	21 June 2012
South Africa	3	3	0	0	9	1	+8	100%	0%	5 March 2009	29 October 2024
South Korea	3	2	1	0	6	0	+6	67%	0%	19 October 2010	16 February 2023
Soviet Union	5	3	1	1	8	5	+3	60%	20%	11 August 1990	8 September 1991
Spain	20	8	7	5	25	20	+5	40%	25%	19 December 1993	27 July 2025
Sweden	30	4	11	15	28	51	−23	13%	50%	15 June 1975	16 July 2024
Switzerland	12	11	1	0	35	6	+29	92%	0%	19 April 1975	3 December 2024
Turkey	4	4	0	0	18	0	+18	100%	0%	26 November 2009	31 October 2013
Ukraine	4	4	0	0	10	2	+8	100%	0%	30 October 2000	19 June 2014
United States	20	5	3	12	15	41	−26	25%	60%	23 August 1985	30 November 2024
Wales	11	10	1	0	43	3	+40	91%	0%	17 March 1974	13 July 2025
West Germany	2	0	0	2	1	5	−4	0%	100%	22 August 1984	5 August 1990
Total	493	278	82	133	1111	509	+602	56%	27%	18 November 1972	28 October 2025

=== Combined predecessor and successor records ===
Opponent	Played	Won	Drawn	Lost	For	Against	Diff	Win %	Loss %
Germany; West Germany	29	3	4	22	25	71	−46	10%	75.86%

=== List of FIFA members who have never have played against England ===
AFC

- Afghanistan
- Bahrain
- Bangladesh
- Bhutan
- Brunei
- Cambodia
- Chinese Taipei
- Guam
- Hong Kong
- India
- Indonesia
- Iran
- Iraq
- Jordan
- Kuwait
- Kyrgyzstan
- Laos
- Lebanon
- Macau
- Malaysia
- Maldives
- Mongolia
- Myanmar
- Nepal
- North Korea
- Oman
- Pakistan
- Palestine
- Philippines
- Qatar
- Saudi Arabia
- Singapore
- Sri Lanka
- Syria
- Tajikistan
- Thailand
- Timor-Leste
- Turkmenistan
- United Arab Emirates
- Uzbekistan
- Vietnam
- Yemen

CAF

- Algeria
- Angola
- Benin
- Botswana
- Burkina Faso
- Burundi
- Cape Verde
- Central African Republic
- Chad
- Comoros
- Congo
- Djibouti
- DR Congo
- Egypt
- Equatorial Guinea
- Eritrea
- Eswatini
- Ethiopia
- Gabon
- Gambia
- Ghana
- Guinea
- Guinea-Bissau
- Ivory Coast
- Kenya
- Lesotho
- Liberia
- Libya
- Madagascar
- Malawi
- Mali
- Mauritania
- Mauritius
- Morocco
- Mozambique
- Namibia
- Niger
- Rwanda
- São Tomé and Príncipe
- Senegal
- Seychelles
- Sierra Leone
- Somalia
- South Sudan
- Sudan
- Tanzania
- Togo
- Tunisia
- Uganda
- Zambia
- Zimbabwe

CONCACAF

- Anguilla
- Antigua and Barbuda
- Aruba
- Bahamas
- Barbados
- Belize
- Bermuda
- British Virgin Islands
- Cayman Islands
- Costa Rica
- Cuba
- Curaçao
- Dominica
- Dominican Republic
- El Salvador
- Grenada
- Guatemala
- Guyana
- Honduras
- Montserrat
- Nicaragua
- Panama
- Puerto Rico
- Saint Kitts and Nevis
- Saint Lucia
- Saint Vincent and the Grenadines
- Suriname
- Trinidad and Tobago
- Turks and Caicos Islands
- U.S. Virgin Islands

CONMEBOL

- Bolivia
- Chile
- Ecuador
- Paraguay
- Peru
- Uruguay
- Venezuela

OFC

- American Samoa
- Cook Islands
- Fiji
- New Caledonia
- Papua New Guinea
- Samoa
- Solomon Islands
- Tahiti
- Tonga
- Vanuatu

UEFA

- Albania
- Andorra
- Armenia
- Azerbaijan
- Bulgaria
- Cyprus
- Faroe Islands
- Georgia
- Gibraltar
- Greece
- Israel
- Kosovo
- Liechtenstein
- Lithuania
- Moldova
- Poland
- San Marino
- Slovakia
