= Carol Thomas =

English footballer (born 1955)

Carol Thomas BEM
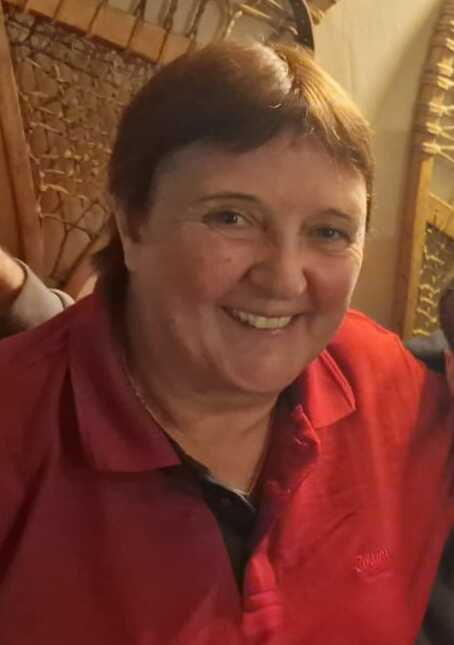
- Thomas in 2022

Personal information
- Date of birth: 5 June 1955 (age 71)
- Place of birth: Hull, England
- Positions: Defender; midfielder

Senior career*
Years	Team	Apps	(Gls)
1966–????	BOCM Ladies		
- Reckitts Ladies
- Hull Brewery Ladies
- Preston Ladies
- CP Doncaster Ladies
–1985	Rowntrees F.C. Ladies		
1993–2002	AFC Preston		
2004–2009	Brandesburton Ladies		

International career
1974–1985	Northern England		
1974–1985	England	56	
- * Club domestic league appearances and goals

Carol Thomas BEM (née McCune; born 5 June 1955) is an English former footballer who played predominantly as a right-back; she is known for her 43-year club career and 9-year captaincy of the England women's national football team, during which she became the first women's international footballer to reach 50 caps.

She played club football for a variety of teams around the north of England and was the second captain of England in the modern era, taking over from Sheila Parker in 1976. Thomas became captain at the age of 20 (Note: Generally reported as being named captain aged 21, the first England match of the 1976 Home International was in May 1976.) and held that position until her retirement with a then-record 56 caps in 1985. She remained England's longest continuous-serving captain before being overtaken by Faye White in 2011; she was also the most successful captain of the England women's national team in terms of tournament successes until international titles were won under Leah Williamson.

Thomas is regarded as one of the pioneers of modern women's football, and was inducted into the National Football Museum's Hall of Fame in 2021.

== Early and personal life ==
Carol McCune was born on 5 June 1955 in Kingston upon Hull in the East Riding of Yorkshire to Percy George "Mac" and Audrey McCune. Her father was an amateur footballer who had been a founding member of Air Street United, a small local team; he, her uncles, and her older brother Michael, inspired her love of football. She recalls kicking a ball around with them until she was eleven, being inspired by England winning the 1966 FIFA World Cup to play more seriously.

She married Alan Thomas in July 1979; they skipped a honeymoon to fly out to Italy with the England squad shortly thereafter, for Carol Thomas to take part in that year's unofficial European Championship. Alan played for and managed Aldbrough United in the East Riding County League, and some Sunday league football, saying he always knew Thomas would be much more successful in the sport than him. They have two children, Andrew and Mark. Thomas had retired to start a family, not expecting to return to football.

== Club career ==
Thomas played in her first competitive game in September 1966, when she was 11; that summer her family had moved house to be closer to her father's work, with one of their new neighbours playing for BOCM Ladies (British Oil and Cake Mills). Thomas joined this team as a traditional right winger. Women's football was still banned in England at the time, as it would be until 1971, with leagues contested by teams supported by companies being "the lifeblood". Thomas reflected that, though she believed she showed good skills for a child, the team may well have initially taken her on to make up numbers. She impressed while playing for BOCM; national football administrator Flo Bilton was involved with the league and asked Thomas to join the local team she coached for Reckitt, Reckitts Ladies.

She then joined Reckitts' local rivals, Hull Brewery Ladies (Hull Brewery), "after a couple of seasons"; she stayed with the team, which played in the Hull Women's League, for many years. She played in a variety of positions with Hull Brewery and earned a regular spot in the Hull and District representative team as a teenager. She was called to both the Northern England and England teams in 1974. In the same year, to support herself, she took a job as a clerk at Northern Dairies; the company did not have a football team, but she played netball for them. They also gave her paid leave when she was playing for England, something unusual for the time, with many of her teammates having to take holidays.

Standing out in football, Thomas refused offers of professionalism from teams in Italy and New Zealand in order to maintain the strict amateur status enforced by the Women's Football Association (which operated the national team) at that time. Still, she sought out better football: she was a guest player for Tottenham Hotspur on a tour to Switzerland, and spent a year at Preston Ladies (in Lancashire), but travel was an issue. When Thomas returned to playing in Yorkshire, with several seasons at CP Doncaster Ladies, she also had the opportunity to train with the men's Hull City A.F.C. youth team. In 1981, she was playing for both Doncaster and Reckitts again. She then initially retired in 1985 while playing for Rowntrees F.C. Ladies (Rowntree's), having taken them through the rounds of the Women's FA Cup.

== International career ==
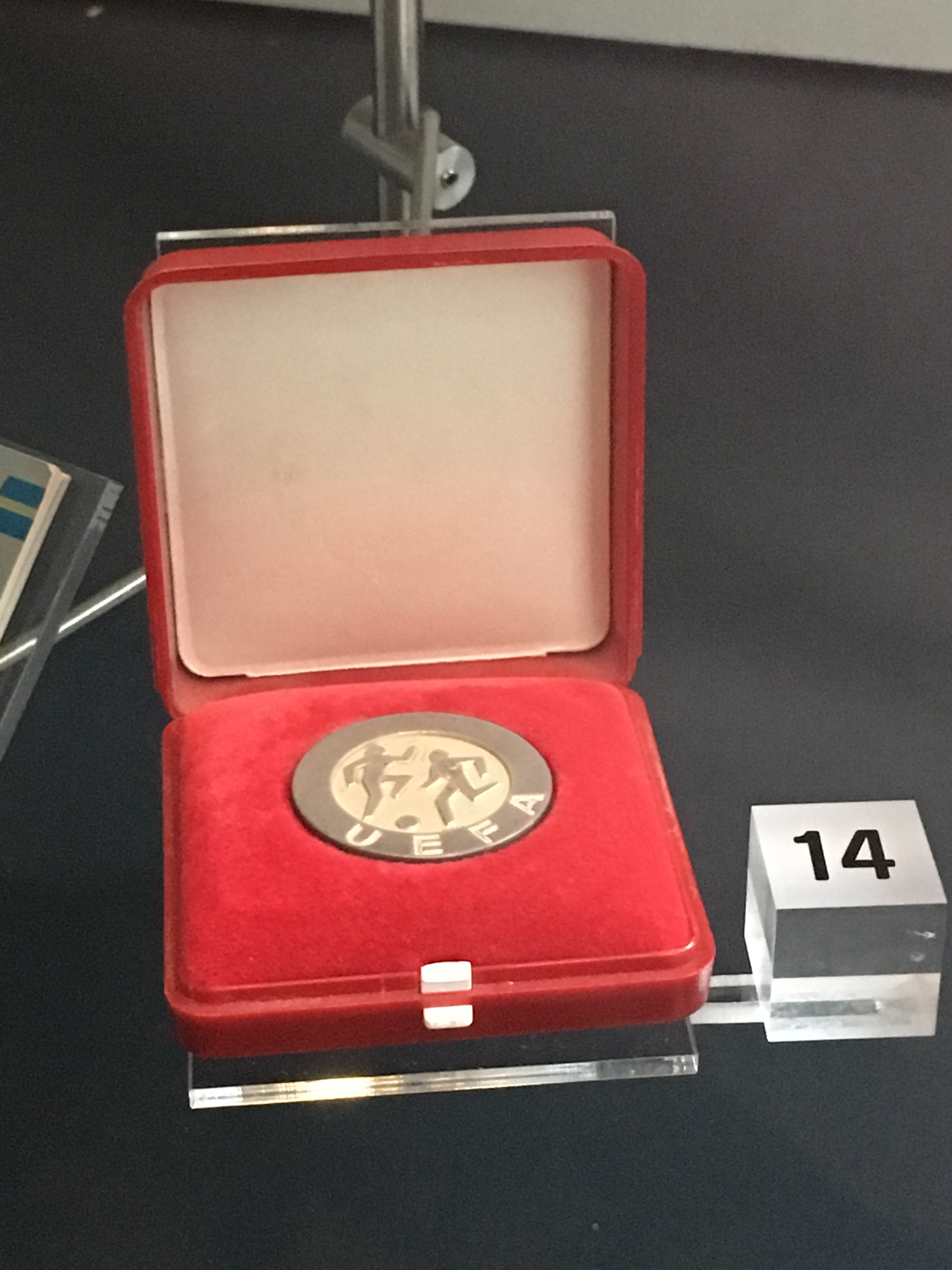
Thomas' runners-up medal from the 1984 UEFA Women's Championship

Bilton introduced Thomas to more opportunities in football. In 1974, when Thomas was establishing herself in the Northern England team, she was invited to the first all-women coaching course held at the then-national footballing centre, Lilleshall. Thomas, along with four others, gained her FA Preliminary Badge to be the first female qualified coaches in England. The course was being run by the England women's manager, Tom Tranter, and Thomas' performances on it impressed him, resulting in her being asked to trial for England. At the trials, she impressed in her position as a winger.

She then made her first international appearance in November 1974, for a 2–0 win over France at Plough Lane; Tranter substituted her on in the second half to play at right back, a position she had never played before. She made two substitute appearances before becoming the first choice right back. For the 1976 Pony Home Internationals, Sheila Parker, the first England women's captain, was not in the squad; Tranter made Thomas, with six caps, captain, shortly before her 21st birthday (to become one of England's youngest captains). England won the tournament. Thomas retained her captaincy under Tranter's successor Martin Reagan and became an ever-present until September 1985; she recalls that she missed only one England match between her first call-up and retirement, a 1985 match against Wales that took place on the Isle of Man, with most of the squad's Northern players unable to go "due to logistical and financial restraints".

During her time as captain, she saw the England women's team play at a Football League First Division ground for the first time (in 1978, to a then-record crowd of 5,471) and play outside of Europe for the first time (for the 1981 Mundialito in Japan). The team's record under Thomas saw them reach at least the semi-finals in all seven tournaments in which they competed, winning two: the 1976 Pony Home Championship and the 1985 Mundialito. They were runners-up in the 1984 UEFA Women's Championship, the first official European final that any England team had reached; it was played over two legs, each a 1–0 victory for the home side, with England losing 3–4 on penalties at a muddy Kenilworth Road. This loss was said to spur Thomas on to the best period of her career in leading England to the Mundialito victory the following year. With the success of the 1985 Mundialito, and having successfully led her England team in three consecutive match victories in 1987 UEFA Women's Championship qualifying, Thomas retired from international football later in 1985 at the age of 30 to have her first child. She was pregnant before her retirement, and was known to joke that her eldest child was the only man to play a women's international game. Sue Law took over as England's right back while Debbie Bampton inherited the captaincy.

Thomas was the 22nd player to represent the Lionesses, and was given this as her legacy number by the FA in 2022, in honour of the 50th anniversary of the women's team. In total, she won 56 caps in an 11-year England career, serving as captain for up to 51 of those matches. (Note: As women's international tournaments were "unofficial, invitation or in their infancy", records of her matches as captain differ. She was England captain for either 49 (Guinness World Records and Wendy Owen), 50 (England Football Online archives, presumptive), or 51 (National Football Museum) matches.) In March 1985, England beat Scotland 4–0 at Deepdale in Preston and Thomas was presented with her 50th cap by Tom Finney after the game.

=== International tournaments ===
#	Date	Tournament	Hosts	Position
1	1976	Pony Home Internationals	England	Winners
2	1979	Unofficial European Cup	Italy	4th place
3	1981	Mundialito	Japan	3rd place
4	1982–84	UEFA Women's Championship	No hosts	Runners up
5	1984	Mundialito	Italy	3rd place
6	1985	Mundialito	Italy	Winners
7	1985–87	UEFA Women's Championship	Norway	4th place *

* Played in the first three winning group games before retiring.

== Later life and career ==
In 1993, Thomas came out of retirement to help establish local club AFC Preston; initially helping out and coaching the team, she quickly found herself wanting to play again, joining the club regularly. When the East Riding County FA created its first women's representative team in 1995, Thomas was asked to work with the coaching staff and, though aged 40, captain the side. She continued playing for both teams until 2002, taking a break but being drawn back into football two years later when asked to help set-up Brandesburton Ladies. She retired from Brandesburton at the age of 54 in 2009, at which point she was a midfielder, stopping playing after 43 years. In her later playing career, she had contributed further to grassroots football in supporting youth clubs in the rural north of England.

A keen walker, following her retirement she took up hiking challenges, as well as inspiring her grandchildren to take part in football. By 2015 she had completed all 214 Wainwrights, undertaken the National Three Peaks Challenge, and completed the Coast to Coast Walk. Her hiking led to mountain treks, involving passes at above 18,000 ft in the Andes, Himalayas and Atlas Mountains, which in turn led to an interest in high-altitude communities and her support for people in Nepal following the April 2015 Nepal earthquake.

Settling in Aldbrough, Thomas was a school lunchtime supervisor until 2001, and then delivered post until 2013. She now runs a Twitter account dedicated to English women's football before the Women's Super League, and is the ambassador for Hull City Ladies F.C.

== Recognition and popular culture ==
By the late 1970s her achievements were being acknowledged outside the game: in 1978 and 1979 she made appearances on the sports show Superstars, and in 1984 she was interviewed on national breakfast television (the first women's player to be so) after the 1984 Euro final defeat. In 1985 she was awarded the Sports Council Sports Award. Her 1984 Euro runner-up medal is on display at the National Football Museum. Thomas' record achievement as the first women's footballer to reach 50 international caps was given an entry in the Guinness World Records book in 1986, making her the first female footballer with an entry in it. The five-a-side trophy contested by England women's players in training camps at St George's Park is named after Thomas; a 1979 Hull-area girls' five-a-side trophy was also named after her.

In 2019, Thomas reflected that the Football Association, which began administering the England women's team in 1992, seemed to her to act like there was no team before their involvement, which she felt was erasing the team's achievements of her era. She saw greater recognition come as women's football grew in popularity in the 2020s: in November 2021 she was inducted into the English Football Hall of Fame; in April 2022, a plaque was unveiled in her honour in Hull at the East Riding County FA building; and in June 2022 she was awarded the British Empire Medal (BEM) in the 2022 Birthday Honours for services to association football and charity. Though well-recognised during her time as England captain, she said that she received the most media attention when the team won the UEFA Women's Euro 2022. In January 2023 she received the Freedom of the City of Hull.
