= Mike Rawding =

English football manager and administrator

Personal information
- Full name: Michael Henry Rawding
- Date of birth: 9 November 1936
- Place of birth: Grantham, Lincolnshire, England
- Date of death: 14 February 2005 (aged 68)
- Place of death: East Riding of Yorkshire, England

Managerial career
- Years: Team
- 1973–1978: North Ferriby United
- 1979: England women

Michael Henry Rawding (9 November 1936 – 14 February 2005) was an English association football coach and administrator. He managed North Ferriby United during the 1970s and the England women's national football team for one match in 1979.

A County level amateur player in his youth, Rawding turned out for Ancaster FC and RAF Hemswell in Lincolnshire, then Haltemprice AFC and Ainthorpe Old Boys in Yorkshire. During this period he was also selected for the East Riding County Football Association (ERCFA) at senior representative level. In 1958, he qualified as a Class III referee, allowing him to officiate at school and inter–district level. He was once a linesman at an England versus Germany Under–15 schoolboy match.

Rawding obtained his full Football Association (FA) coaching badge in 1968. He coached the Hull schools FA representative team for 28 years (1960–1988), the ERCFA teams at youth and senior level (1983–1987) and managed North Ferriby United from 1973 to 1978. In September 1979 the Women's Football Association (WFA) enlisted Rawding to take charge of the managerless England women's national football team for a friendly match against Denmark at Boothferry Park in Hull. England recovered a two-goal deficit to draw the match 2–2 before a crowd of 1,100.

Martin Reagan was appointed the next manager of England women, while Rawding returned to the role of coaching Hull City's Under–16 team which he had taken up the previous year. He performed the job with distinction until 1985, to the extent that Hull City's youth development department later established an annual Mike Rawding Memorial Trophy.

After rising through the ranks of the schools and local football authorities, Rawding was appointed as the East Riding representative to the FA in 1989.

He was elected to the FA board of directors in July 2004. He was unable to participate in the inquiry into the Faria Alam scandal as he was on holiday, recuperating from surgery.

== Death ==
Rawding died in Yorkshire in 2005, aged 68, after a long illness.

== Sources ==
- Lopez, Sue (1997). Women on the Ball: A Guide to Women's Football. London, UK: Scarlet Press. ISBN 1857270169.
