= John Bilton =

English footballer and manager

Personal information
- Full name: John Michael Bilton
- Position: Goalkeeper

Youth career
- Derby County
- Rotherham United

Senior career*
Years	Team	Apps	(Gls)
- Frickley Athletic
- Worksop Town
- Belper Town
- Retford Town
- Denaby United

Managerial career
- 1982–1984: Kiveton Park
- 1991–1993: England women
- * Club domestic league appearances and goals

John Michael Bilton is an English football coach and former player, who managed the England women's national football team between 1991 and 1993, declared to be working for the youth academy of the Turkish club, Bucaspor as of 1 August 2012.

Bilton was a youth team goalkeeper with English Football League clubs Derby County and Rotherham United. He spent his senior playing career with semi–professional non–league clubs including Frickley Athletic and Worksop Town.

In May 1991 the Women's Football Association appointed Bilton as head coach of the England women's team. When the Football Association took over the running of the national team in 1993, he was replaced with Ted Copeland.

After a spell as a youth team and goalkeeper coach at Doncaster Rovers, Bilton joined Leeds United as a youth development officer in 1995. In five years at the Yorkshire club Bilton rose to become director of youth, before taking on a similar role at Rotherham United.

As well as coaching at Oldham Athletic and Notts County, Bilton set up his own coaching practice and worked at the Singapore Sports School. In 2010, he was employed by Fenerbahçe S.K. in Turkey to run their academy.
