= Flo Bilton =

English football coach and administrator

Personal information
- Full name: Florence Bilton
- Date of birth: 1921
- Place of birth: Hull, England
- Date of death: 22 July 2004 (aged 82–83)
- Place of death: Hull, England
- Position: Goalkeeper

Managerial career
- Years: Team
- Reckitt & Colman

Florence "Flo" Bilton (1921 – 22 July 2004) was an English footballer, association football coach and administrator. Considered a pioneer of the women's game, she was an officer of the Women's Football Association (WFA) from its formation in 1969 until its incorporation into The FA in 1993.

== Career ==
Bilton played as a goalkeeper from the 1940s while working at the Reckitt & Colman factory. She also played hockey, netball and cricket for works teams there. In 1963, she put together a women's football team from the factory to play against a team from the nearby Smith & Nephew factory. Reckitt & Colman won 2–1, with Bilton playing as a veteran goalkeeper. She remained as Reckitt & Colman manager and established the Hull League, serving as secretary thereof. She later helped local players Carol Thomas and Gail Borman progress to the England national team.

Bilton set up the Hull Women's FA in 1966, and was one of the founding members of the national WFA, established in 1969. Bilton undertook a variety of unglamorous but important off-field roles during the organisation's 24-year history. She borrowed an England national football team cap from her neighbour Raich Carter and made copies for England's women's national team players after the FA refused to issue official caps for them.

== Legacy ==
Former England player Wendy Owen praised Bilton in her 2005 autobiography: "She was a wonderful person who could and did turn her hand to just about anything that might help other women to get enjoyment out of the game." In 1997 Sue Lopez declared: "Flo Bilton is one of the unsung heroines and one of the greatest supporters of women's football."

In 2018 Bilton was awarded a commemorative plaque by her home city of Kingston upon Hull. At the Guildhall unveiling, former England captains Karen Walker and Carol Thomas both made speeches in Bilton's honour.

Some of the England caps made by Bilton have been displayed in exhibitions exploring the history of women's football. One of them is on display at the National Football Museum in Manchester.

== Bibliography ==
- Lopez, Sue (1997). Women on the Ball: A Guide to Women's Football. London, England: Scarlet Press. ISBN 1-85727-016-9.
- Owen, Wendy (2005). Kicking Against Tradition: A Career in Women's Football. Tempus. ISBN 0752434276.
- Williams, John; Ward, Andrew (2009). "Wembley 1966 and After". Football Nation: Sixty Years of the Beautiful Game. Bloomsbury. ISBN 9781408801260.
