= Dick Bate =

English footballer and manager (1946–2018)

Personal information
- Date of birth: 25 June 1946
- Date of death: 25 April 2018 (aged 71)

Youth career
- Sheffield Wednesday
- York City

Senior career*
Years	Team	Apps	(Gls)
????–1971	Alfreton Town		
1971–1976	Boston United		
1975–1977	Buxton		
1977–1978	Mossley		
- Frickley Athletic

Managerial career
- 1975: Buxton (Player-Manager)
- 1977–1978: Mossley (First Team Manager)
- 1978: Sheffield Weds (Youth Team Coach)
- 1980–1985: FA North West Regional Coach
- 1985: Notts County (Chief Coach)
- 1987: Southend (Manager)
- 1987–1988: Lincoln City (Assistant Manager)
- 1988–1992: Leeds United (Coach)
- 1992–1995: Malaysia national football team (Technical Director)
- 1995: Hereford (Coach)
- 1998: England U16s-U20s (Coach)
- 1998: England (Caretaker Manager)
- 2005: Canadian Soccer Association (Technical Director)
- 2006: Watford (Technical Director)
- 2012–2015: Cardiff City (Academy Manager)
- * Club domestic league appearances and goals

Richard Bate (25 June 1946 – 25 April 2018) was an English football player and coach.

As a coach, he was the head of the youth Academy for Cardiff City, before leaving in 2015. Prior to that he was the Elite Coaching Manager of the Football Association, the governing body for football in England.

== Playing career ==
Wilkinson moved to Mossley in December 1976 as player-manager and when he resigned the following May he recommended Bate as his successor and Bate was duly appointed player-manager in June 1977. However, despite steering Mossley into the first round of the FA Cup for only the (then) third time in their history, he departed the club following a 2–2 draw with Frickley Athletic on 2 January 1978.

== Coaching career ==
=== Southend United ===
In June 1987, Bate was appointed manager of Southend United by the club's chairman Vic Jobson without consulting his fellow board members. He reign lasted just ten games with a solitary victory in the Football League Cup and he departed with the worst record of any Southend manager in history.

Bate moved on to join Lincoln City as assistant manager to Colin Murphy, helping the club regain its Football League status at the end of the 1987–88 season. He moved on to rejoin Wilkinson at Leeds United acting as a coach between 1988 and 1992. He moved to Malaysia as Technical Director, a role he held from 1992 to 1995, before joining the coaching staff of Hereford United. In 1998, he became the coach of the England youth set-up working with the U16, U17, U18, U19 and U20 teams. He was caretaker manager of the England women's national football team for a match against Italy in April 1998; between the resignation of Ted Copeland and appointment of Hope Powell.

=== Canada ===
In September 2005, the appointment of Bate as the Canadian Soccer Association's Technical Director was announced with the role commencing on 14 October 2005. He held the role for ten months before resigning in order to join Watford.

=== Watford ===
In July 2006, Bate was appointed Technical Director at Watford with the Hornet's then manager Aidy Boothroyd being quoted as saying "I want Watford Football Club to have the best Academy in the world and I believe we have captured the best developer of talent in the world in the shape of Richard."

=== Cardiff City ===
On 2 November 2012, it was confirmed that Bate was to take on the role of the Head of the youth Academy for Cardiff City, replacing the departing Neal Ardley.

== Life after coaching ==
Before the time of his death in April 2018, Bate worked with Burnley on a consultancy basis during the clubs redevelopment of the Barnfield Training Centre.
