= Brent Hills =

English football coach (born 1953)

Personal information
- Date of birth: 3 November 1953 (age 72)
- Position: Right back

Senior career*
Years	Team	Apps	(Gls)
- Kingstonian
- Feltham

Managerial career
- 2004–2013: England Women U23
- 2006: England Women (caretaker)
- 2013: England Women (caretaker)
- 2014: England Women U19
- * Club domestic league appearances and goals

Brent Hills is an English football coach who is the assistant manager at FA Women's Super League team Leicester City.

== Career ==
Hills played non-league football for Kingstonian and Feltham, as a right back.

He trained as a PE teacher and was also a college lecturer, before coaching in England and the US at Brentford, Millwall, Fulham, Watford and Chapman University. Hills was responsible for starting the first female football academy in 1998 at Southwark College.

In February 2002 Hills was appointed the first full-time assistant coach to the England women's national football team. When England reintroduced an under-21 team in 2004, national coach Hope Powell put Hills in charge of it. He took the senior team to Aalen for a 5–1 friendly defeat to Germany in October 2006, when Powell was recovering from a hip operation.

He became caretaker manager of the England women's national team on 23 August 2013, after Powell was sacked by The Football Association (FA). He will take charge of England's opening qualification matches for the 2015 FIFA Women's World Cup.

In September 2013 Hills spoke about his desire to become the team's permanent manager.

In October 2013 the FA delayed announcing who would have the job on a permanent basis, and in December 2013 Mark Sampson was appointed to the position. Hills was subsequently named head of women's elite development.

In May 2017, it was announced that Hills would leave his role at The FA after 15 years at the organisation.

In November 2021 he was appointed assistant manager at FA Women's Super League team Leicester City.
