= Tom Tranter =

English football coach (1940–2005)

Personal information
- Date of birth: 1940
- Place of birth: Shropshire, England
- Date of death: 2005 (aged 64–65)
- Place of death: British Virgin Islands
- Position: Midfielder

Senior career*
Years	Team	Apps	(Gls)
1970	Hayes	1	(0)

Managerial career
- 1973–1979: England women
- 1979: Keflavík
- * Club domestic league appearances and goals

Thomas G. Tranter (1940–2005) was an English academic, and a football player and football coach. He was head coach of the England women's national team for six years during the 1970s.

Tranter worked as a coach with Hayes and played for the first team. While coaching at amateur club Southall, Tranter motivated a young Gordon Hill who returned to the professional ranks with Millwall and went on to play for Manchester United and England.

Tranter also coached at Woking, Slough Town and Brentford, as well as being sent on various foreign assignments in his capacity as a Football Association staff coach, including coaching the England's Women Team between 1973 and 1979. In 1979, he went to Iceland to coach Keflavík.

In his academic career Tranter worked at Brunel University for 34 years and was made an honorary fellow in 2003, after retiring in July 2002.

He and his wife Sandra had a son, Mark, and a daughter, Rachel.
