= Martin Reagan =

English footballer (1924–2016)

Personal information
- Full name: Charles Martin Reagan
- Date of birth: 12 May 1924
- Place of birth: Newcastle-upon-Tyne, England
- Date of death: 26 December 2016 (aged 92)
- Position: Winger

Senior career*
Years	Team	Apps	(Gls)
–1946	York Railway Institute		
1946–1947	York City	1	(0)
1947–1948	Hull City	18	(1)
1948–1951	Middlesbrough	24	(4)
1951–1952	Shrewsbury Town	58	(9)
1952–1954	Portsmouth	5	(0)
1954–1956	Norwich City	34	(4)
1956–	March Town United		
Total		140	(18)

Managerial career
- March Town United
- Goole Town
- 1979–1990: England Women
- * Club domestic league appearances and goals

Charles Martin Reagan (12 May 1924 – 26 December 2016) was an English professional football player and coach. During his playing career, Reagan played in the Football League for York City, Hull City, Middlesbrough, Shrewsbury Town, Portsmouth and Norwich City. He later coached the England women's national team. Prior to his football career Reagan served as a Staff Sgt Tank Commander in World War II.

== Playing career ==
From 1947 to 1948 Reagan made 18 appearances for Hull, where he attracted the attention of Middlesbrough, in 1948 paid £5,000 to sign Reagan from Hull City. Over the next three years he scored four goals in 25 league and cup appearances, and is credited with scoring Middlesbrough's 1000th league goal, before joining Shrewsbury Town. On New Year's Eve 1952 Portsmouth bought Reagan from Shrewsbury for £12,000 and played him in their next five matches. Reagan did not play for Portsmouth again but remained with the club until August 1954 when he joined Norwich City. After two years with Norwich, Reagan became player manager at March Town United in the Eastern Counties Football League.

== Coaching career ==
After managing March, Reagan became manager at Goole Town. He later became head coach of the England women's national team from 1979 until 1990, and was in charge for 96 matches during his 11-year tenure. Reagan took England to the final of the 1984 European Competition for Women's Football, where they lost a two-legged tie to Sweden after a penalty shoot out at Kenilworth Road in Luton. Despite also winning the Mundialito (known as the little World Cup) twice in 1985 and 1988, the Women's Football Association (WFA) sacked Reagan in 1990 when a 6–1 UEFA Women's Euro 1991 quarter final aggregate defeat by Germany cost England a place at the inaugural FIFA Women's World Cup.

At the 1985 Mundialito Reagan had noticed the potential of the United States women's national team, when England beat them 3–1 in their third ever match. He wrote a prescient letter to his American counterpart Mike Ryan which said "The day cannot be very distant when you will be a world force." From 1989 to 2003 Reagan was director of coaching at the Two Rivers Soccer Camp in California, USA.

== Personal life ==
As well as his football career Reagan worked as a self–employed sales agent. Prior to his death in December 2016, Reagan was the oldest surviving Middlesbrough FC player and lived in a Kirk Hammerton care home. Before his football career, Reagan served as a Staff Sgt Tank Commander in 204 Armoured Assault Squadron, Royal Engineers, during World War II. On 20 October 1994, the 50th anniversary of an explosion which killed many of his tank squadron, Reagan visited Ijzendijke in the Netherlands with his three sons and began a campaign to fund and build a memorial to those who had died. The memorial, at the entry to Isabellaweg Farm, is the site of an annual commemoration of the British and Canadian soldiers who died there.

== Bibliography ==
- Lopez, Sue (1997). Women on the Ball: A Guide to Women's Football. London, England: Scarlet Press. ISBN 1857270169.
