= Mundialito (women) =

- Founded: 1984; 42 years ago
- Abolished: 1988
- Region: International
- Last champions: England (2nd title)
- Most championships: Italy (3 titles)

The International Ladies Football Festival better known as Mundialito (Spanish for "little World Cup") was a global invitational tournament for national teams in women's association football. Held on four occasions in the northern region of Italy since 1984, it was one of the most prestigious women's football events, prior to the advent of the FIFA Women's World Cup and Women's Olympic Football.

== History ==
The first edition of the tournament was played in Japan in September 1981. Italy drew 1–1 with Denmark then beat Japan 9–0, while England beat Japan 4–0 but lost 1–0 to Denmark. Japan–Denmark and England–Italy fixtures were not played.

In 1984 and 1985, the teams first played round-robin within a single pool, then a further match to decide the winner and third place. In 1986 and 1988, the preliminary round was contested within two groups, each sending a team to participate in the final match.

The most successful teams were Italy with three titles and England with two titles. The 1985 tournament was notable for the international debut of the United States women's national soccer team.

Another more recent international tournament for women's football teams, the Algarve Cup, has also been unofficially known as the Mundialito.

== Results ==
Year	Hosts	Teams	Final			Third Place Match		
Year	Hosts	Teams	Winner	Score	Runner-up	3rd Place	Score	4th Place
1981	Japan	4	Italy	(Partial) round-robin	Denmark	England	(Partial) round-robin	Japan
1984	Italy	4	Italy	3–1	West Germany	England	2–1	Belgium
1985	Italy	4	England	3–2	Italy	Denmark	1–0	United States
1986	Italy	6	Italy	1–0	United States	China	2–1	Japan
1988	Italy	6	England	2–1 (aet)	Italy	United States	1–0	France

== See also ==
- 1988 FIFA Women's Invitation Tournament
