= Ted Copeland =

English football manager (born 1940)

Personal information
- Date of birth: 22 February 1940 (age 86)

Managerial career
- Years: Team
- 1993–1998: England Women

Ted Copeland (born 22 February 1940) is an English former football coach. He managed the England women's side between 1993 and 1998, leading them to a quarter-final appearance in the 1995 World Cup.

Copeland spent 12 years working as a lecturer in physical education at the University of Petroleum and Minerals in Dhahran, Saudi Arabia. While in Saudi Arabia, he also played for and coached Ettifaq FC in the Saudi Premier League and coached the Saudi Under-16 and Under-19 National Teams.

He had a spell with Hartlepool United where he was first-team coach.

In 1990, Copeland became the Football Association's Regional Director of Coaching for the North of England. In 1993, he added the part-time role of England women's coach to his duties and remained in both posts until 1998. His successor, Hope Powell became the first full-time manager of the England women's team.

He later worked as director of sport at East Durham College and was director of education services for a sports marketing company, Navigator.

In August 2006, Copeland and his wife Cindy took early retirement and moved to Parcent, Alicante.
