= List of UEFA Women's Championship finals =

UEFA Women's Championship final
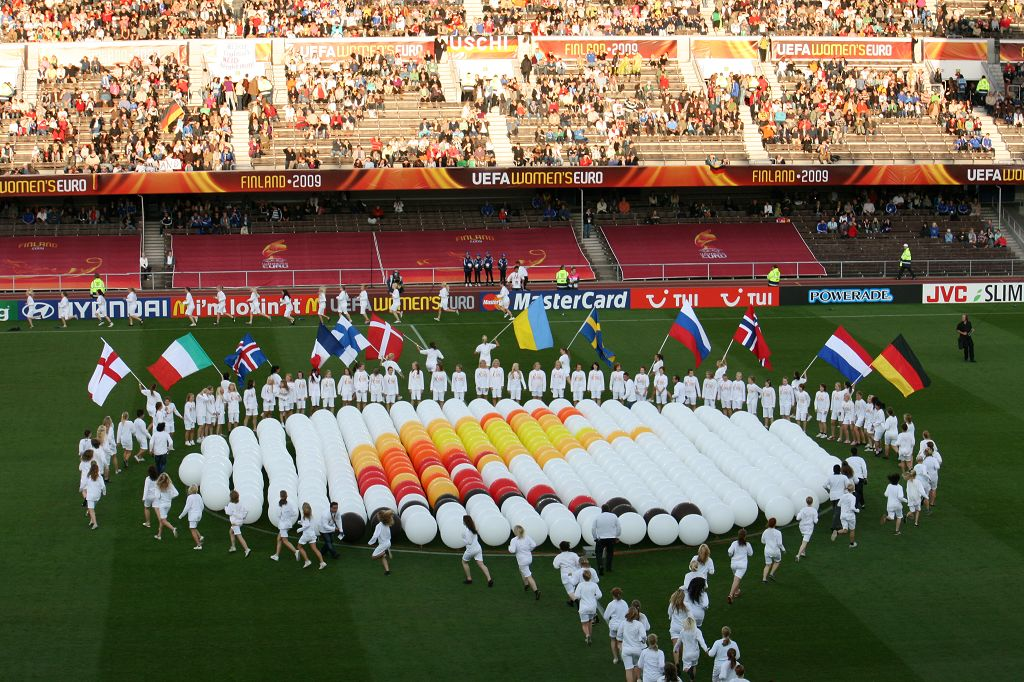
- The ceremony prior to the 2009 final
- Founded: 1984; 42 years ago
- Region: Europe (UEFA)
- Current champions: England (2nd title)
- Most championships: Germany (8 titles)

The UEFA Women's Championship is an association football competition established in 1982. It is contested by the women's national teams of the members of the Union of European Football Associations (UEFA), the sport's European governing body, and takes place every four years. The winners of the first final were Sweden, who defeated England 4–3 on penalties in Luton, after a 1–0 win in Gothenburg and a 1–0 loss in Luton in a two-legged tie. The most recent final was won by England, who beat Spain 3–1 on penalties after extra time in Basel.

The Women's Championship final is the last match of the competition, and the result determines which country's team is declared European champion. As of the 2022 tournament, if after 90 minutes of regular play the score is a draw, an additional 30-minute period of play, called extra time, is added. If such a game is still tied after extra time, it is decided by penalty shoot-out. The team that wins the penalty shoot-out are then declared champions. The 14 finals to-date have produced three drawn matches, which were determined by penalty shoot-out (1984), (2025), and golden goal (2001).

The most successful team is Germany, who have won eight titles. England and Norway have won the competition twice each. Sweden and the Netherlands have won one title each, whilst Italy has reached the final twice without winning and Denmark, Spain has lost their lone final.

== List of finals ==
Key to the list
a.e.t.	Result after extra time
g.g.	Match was won with a golden goal during extra time
pen.	Match was won on a penalty shoot-out

List of finals of the Women's Championship
Tournament	Winners	Score	Runners-up	Venue	Location	Attendance	References
1984	Sweden	1–1 (agg.) (4–3 p)	England	Ullevi	Gothenburg, Sweden	5,662	
1984	Sweden	1–1 (agg.) (4–3 p)	England	Kenilworth Road	Luton, England	2,567	
1987	Norway	2–1	Sweden	Ullevaal Stadion	Oslo, Norway	8,408	
1989	West Germany	4–1	Norway	Stadion an der Bremer Brücke	Osnabrück, West Germany	22,000	
1991	Germany	3–1 (a.e.t.)	Norway	Aalborg Stadium	Aalborg, Denmark	6,000	
1993	Norway	1–0	Italy	Stadio Dino Manuzzi	Cesena, Italy	7,000	
1995	Germany	3–2	Sweden	Fritz-Walter-Stadion	Kaiserslautern, Germany	8,500	
1997	Germany	2–0	Italy	Ullevaal Stadion	Oslo, Norway	2,221	
2001	Germany	1–0 (g.g.)	Sweden	Donaustadion	Ulm, Germany	18,000	
2005	Germany	3–1	Norway	Ewood Park	Blackburn, England	21,105	
2009	Germany	6–2	England	Olympic Stadium	Helsinki, Finland	15,877	
2013	Germany	1–0	Norway	Friends Arena	Solna, Sweden	41,301	
2017	Netherlands	4–2	Denmark	De Grolsch Veste	Enschede, Netherlands	28,182	
2022	England	2–1 (a.e.t.)	Germany	Wembley Stadium	London, England	87,192	
2025	England	1–1 (a.e.t.) (3–1 p)	Spain	St. Jakob-Park	Basel, Switzerland	34,203	
2029	TBA	TBA	TBA	Allianz Arena	Munich, Germany	TBA	

== Results by nation ==
Team	Winners	Runners-up	Total finals	Years won	Years runners-up
Germany (Note: Participated as West Germany in 1989.)	8	1	9	1989, 1991, 1995, 1997, 2001, 2005, 2009, 2013	2022
Norway	2	4	6	1987, 1993	1989, 1991, 2005, 2013
England	2	2	4	2022, 2025	1984, 2009
Sweden	1	3	4	1984	1987, 1995, 2001
Netherlands	1	0	1	2017	–
Italy	0	2	2	–	1993, 1997
Denmark	0	1	1	–	2017
Spain	0	1	1	–	2025
