= UEFA Women's Championship =

European association football tournament for women's national teams

- Organiser(s): UEFA
- Founded: 1982; 44 years ago
- Region: Europe
- Teams: 16 (finals); 52 (qualifiers)
- Qualifier for: Women's Finalissima
- Related competitions: UEFA European Championship
- Current champions: England (2nd title)
- Most championships: Germany (8 titles)
- Website: uefa.com/womenseuro
- UEFA Women's Euro 2029

The UEFA Women's European Championship, also called the UEFA Women's EURO, is the main competition in women's association football between national teams of the UEFA confederation. It is held every four years mostly in odd-numbered years, one year after the men's. It was first held in 1984. The reigning champions are England, who won the tournament in 2022 and 2025. The most successful nation in the history of the tournament is Germany, with eight titles, followed by Norway and England, each with two titles, and Sweden and Netherlands with one title each.

The latest edition of the UEFA Women's Championship was the 2025 tournament held in Switzerland after the previous edition was held in 2022 which was postponed from 2021 due to the COVID-19 pandemic.

The next edition will be held in 2029 and it will be hosted by Germany.

== History ==
=== Previous European championships ===
In 1957 in West Berlin, a European Championship was staged by the International Ladies Football Association. Four teams, representing West Germany, the Netherlands, Austria, and the eventual winners, England, played the tournament at the Poststadion, at a time when women's football teams were officially forbidden by the German Football Association, a ban that was widely defied.

The Italian Women's Football Federation FICF, which eventually merged into the Italian Football Federation, organised a European tournament in Italy in 1969 for women's national teams, a tournament won by the home team, Italy, who beat Denmark 3–1 in the final. The two nations were also the finalists of the 1970 Women's World Cup in Italy.

Italy hosted another European women's tournament a decade later, the 1979 European Competition for Women's Football – won by Denmark.

UEFA displayed little enthusiasm for women's football and were particularly hostile to Italy's independent women's football federation. Sue Lopez, a member of England's squad, contended that a lack of female representation in UEFA was a contributory factor:

In 1971, UEFA had set up a committee for women's football, composed exclusively of male representatives, and by the time this committee folded in 1978 they had failed to organise any international competitions.

=== UEFA organised championships ===
At a conference on 19 February 1980 UEFA resolved to launch its own competition for women's national teams. The meeting minutes had registered the 1979 competition as a "cause for concern". Qualification for the first UEFA-run international tournament began in 1982, with the inaugural 1984 competition being won by Sweden. Norway won the second competition in 1987. A period of German domination then followed, with Germany winning 8 of the 9 competitions from 1989 to 2013, interrupted only by Norway in 1993. The Netherlands won in 2017 followed by England winning the most recent two editions of the competition in 2022 and 2025.

From 1984 to 1995, the tournament was initially played as a four-team event. The 1997 edition was the first that was played with eight teams, followed by the 2001 and 2005 editions. The third expansion happened between 2009 and 2013 when 12 teams participated. From 2017 onwards 16 teams compete for the championship.

The first three tournaments of the UEFA competition in the 1980s had the name "European Competition for Representative Women's Teams". With UEFA's increasing acceptance of women's football, this competition was given European Championship status by UEFA around 1990. Only the 1991 and 1995 editions have been used as European qualifiers for a FIFA Women's World Cup; starting in 1999, women's national teams adopted the separate World Cup qualifying competition and group system used in men's qualifiers.

== Results ==
Edition	Year	Host nation	Final			Third place playoff or losing semi-finalists			Number of teams
Edition	Year	Host nation	Winners	Score	Runners-up	Third place	Score	Fourth place	Number of teams
1	1984	No official host	Sweden	1–1 (agg.) (4–3 p)	England	Denmark and Italy			4
2	1987	Norway	Norway	2–1	Sweden	Italy	2–1	England	4
3	1989	West Germany	West Germany	4–1	Norway	Sweden	2–1 (a.e.t.)	Italy	4
4	1991	Denmark	Germany	3–1 (a.e.t.)	Norway	Denmark	2–1 (a.e.t.)	Italy	4
5	1993	Italy	Norway	1–0	Italy	Denmark	3–1	Germany	4
6	1995	No official host	Germany	3–2	Sweden	England and Norway			4
7	1997	Norway; Sweden	Germany	2–0	Italy	Spain and Sweden			8
8	2001	Germany	Germany	1–0 (g.g.)	Sweden	Denmark and Norway			8
9	2005	England	Germany	3–1	Norway	Finland and Sweden			8
10	2009	Finland	Germany	6–2	England	Netherlands and Norway			12
11	2013	Sweden	Germany	1–0	Norway	Denmark and Sweden			12
12	2017	Netherlands	Netherlands	4–2	Denmark	Austria and England			16
13	2022	England	England	2–1 (a.e.t.)	Germany	France and Sweden			16
14	2025	Switzerland	England	1–1 (a.e.t.) (3–1 p)	Spain	Germany and Italy			16
15	2029	Germany							16

== Records and statistics ==
=== Medal table ===
Rank	Nation	Gold	Silver	Bronze	Total
1	Germany	8	1	1	10
2	Norway	2	4	3	9
3	England	2	2	2	6
4	Sweden	1	3	5	9
5	Netherlands	1	0	1	2
6	Italy	0	2	3	5
7	Denmark	0	1	5	6
8	Spain	0	1	1	2
9	Austria	0	0	1	1
9	Finland	0	0	1	1
9	France	0	0	1	1
Totals (11 entries)		14	14	24	52

=== Total hosts ===
Rank	Nation	Hosts	Year(s)
1	Germany	3	1989, 2001, 2029
2	Norway	2	1987, *1997
2	Sweden	2	*1997, 2013
2	England	2	2005, 2022
5	Denmark	1	1991
5	Italy	1	1993
5	Finland	1	2009
5	Netherlands	1	2017
5	Switzerland	1	2025

- * co-hosts

=== Top goalscorers ===
Rank	Player	Euro															Total
Rank	Player	1984	(Norway) 1987	(West Germany) 1989	(Denmark) 1991	(Italy) 1993	1995	(Norway) (Sweden) 1997	(Germany) 2001	(England) 2005	(Finland) 2009	(Sweden) 2013	(Netherlands) 2017	(England) 2022	(Switzerland) 2025	(Germany) 2029	Total
1	(Germany) Inka Grings									4	6						10
1	(Germany) Birgit Prinz						2	2	1	3	2						10
3	(Italy) Carolina Morace	2	1	0	0	1		4									8
3	(Germany) Heidi Mohr			1	4	1	2										8
3	(Sweden) Lotta Schelin									0	1	5	2				8
6	(England) Beth Mead													6	1		7
7	(Sweden) Stina Blackstenius												2	1	3		6
7	(Sweden) Hanna Ljungberg							1	2	3							6
7	(Germany) Alexandra Popp													6			6
7	(England) Alessia Russo													4	2		6

== See also ==
- FIFA Women's World Cup
- UEFA Women's Champions League
- UEFA Women's Under-17 Championship
- UEFA Women's Under-19 Championship
- UEFA European Championship
