= UEFA Women's Euro 2001 final =

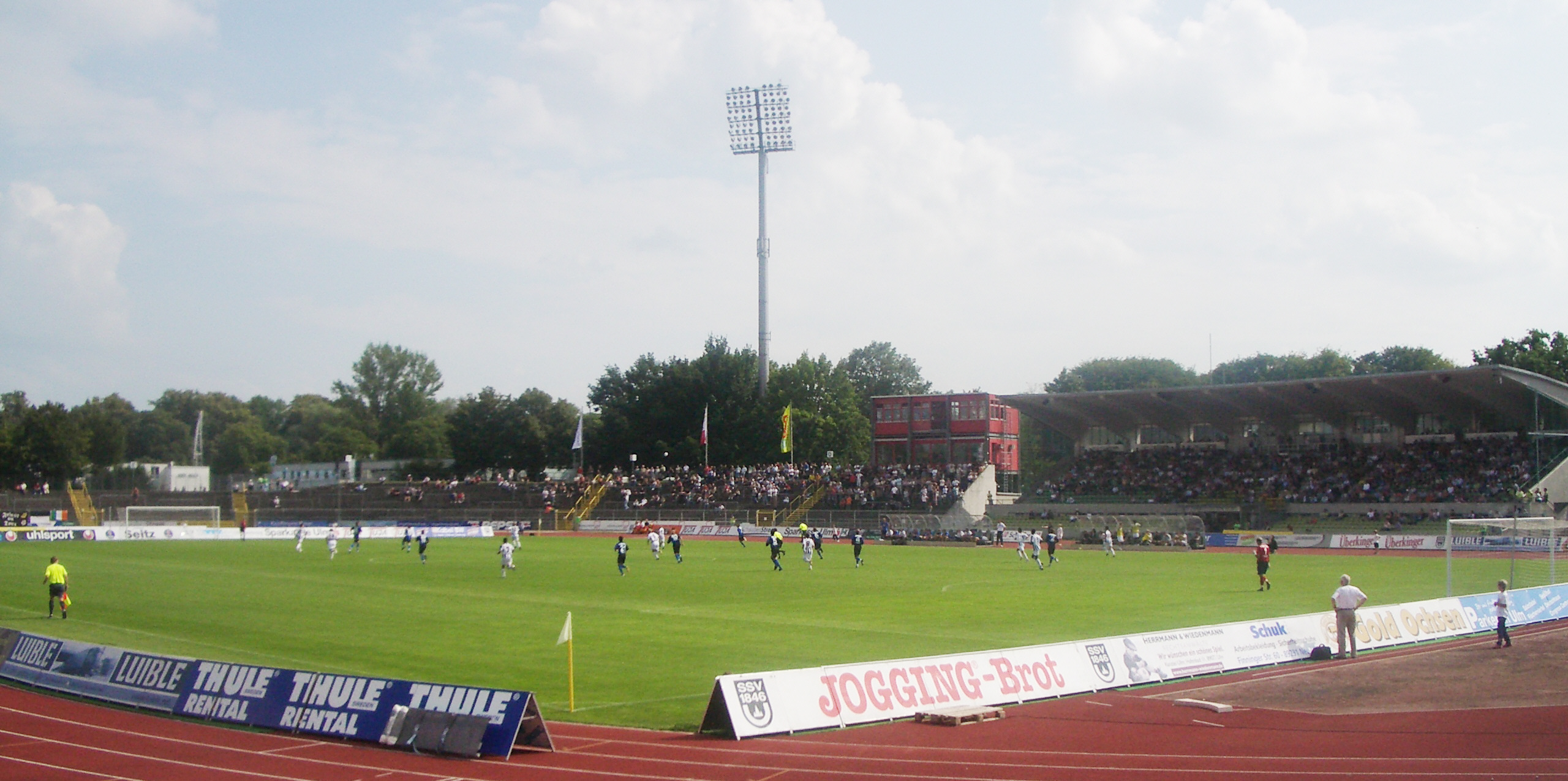
- Donaustadion, Ulm, Germany, where the final was held (pictured here in 2007)
- Event: UEFA Women's Euro 2001
Germany	Sweden
(Germany)	(Sweden)
1	0
- Date: 7 July 2001
- Venue: Donaustadion, Ulm, Germany
- Referee: Nicole Petignat (Switzerland)
- Attendance: 18,000

The final of UEFA Women's Euro 2001 was held on 7 July 2001 at Donaustadion in Ulm, Germany. Claudia Müller scored the only goal of the match, a golden goal in extra time, as Germany won 1–0 to retain their title having won the previous edition in 1997.

== Background ==
UEFA Women's Euro 2001 was the eighth edition of the European football championships for women's national teams organised by UEFA.

Germany (West Germany prior to the reunification of Germany in 1991) were the most successful team in the history of the competition. They had won the competition on four previous occasions and were two-time defending champions coming into the 2001 edition having won the tournament in 1995 and 1997.

Sweden had won the competition on one previous occasion – the inaugural edition in 1984. They had reached the final on two further occasions losing to Norway in 1987 and Germany in 1995.

== Route to the final ==
=== Germany ===
Germany qualified for the tournament by winning their Class A qualifying group. Between September 1999 and August 2000, Germany won five of their six matches against Italy, Ukraine and Iceland – only dropping points in a 4–4 draw against Italy. In the group stage, Germany faced Sweden, Russia and England in Group A. In their opening match at Steigerwaldstadion in Erfurt on 23 June 2001, they came from behind to defeat Sweden 3-1. They followed that up with a 5–1 win against Russia at the same venue four days later. Their final group stage match against England was played at the Ernst-Abbe-Sportfeld in Jena three days later. Germany won 3–0 to end the group with a 100% record. In the knockout stage, Germany defeated Norway 1–0 in the semi-finals at Donaustadion in Ulm on 4 July 2001.

=== Sweden ===
Sweden finished as runners-up to France in their Class A qualifying group which meant they had to take part in the Class A play-offs. Sweden defeated Finland 10–3 over two legs to qualify for the tournament. In the group stage, Sweden faced Germany, Russia and England in Group A. In their opening match at Steigerwaldstadion in Erfurt on 23 June 2001, Sweden lost 3-1 to Germany. Four days later, they defeated England 4–0 at the Ernst-Abbe-Sportfeld in Jena. Their final group stage match was against Russia at the Steigerwaldstadion in Erfurt three days later. Sweden won 1–0 to progress to the knockout stage. Sweden defeated Denmark 1–0 in the semi-finals at Donaustadion in Ulm on 4 July 2001 to progress to the final.

== Match report ==
In a hard-fought match Germany prevailed against Sweden with a golden goal. Tina Theune-Meyer called the current German team the best one ever.

7 July 2001
15:00

Germany	1–0 (a.e.t./g.g.)	Sweden
Müller 98'	Report; SvFF Report (in Swedish); DFB Report (in German); Report

Donaustadion, Ulm
Attendance: 18,000
Referee: Nicole Petignat (Switzerland)

== Aftermath ==
Marika Domanski-Lyfors, the Swedish coach, stated: "Germany earned it because they were the stronger team in the last ten minutes. We played a good game but we did not manage to score so Germany were the better team."

== See also ==
Played between same teams:

- UEFA Women's Euro 1995 final
- 2003 FIFA Women's World Cup final
