= UEFA Women's Euro 2005 final =

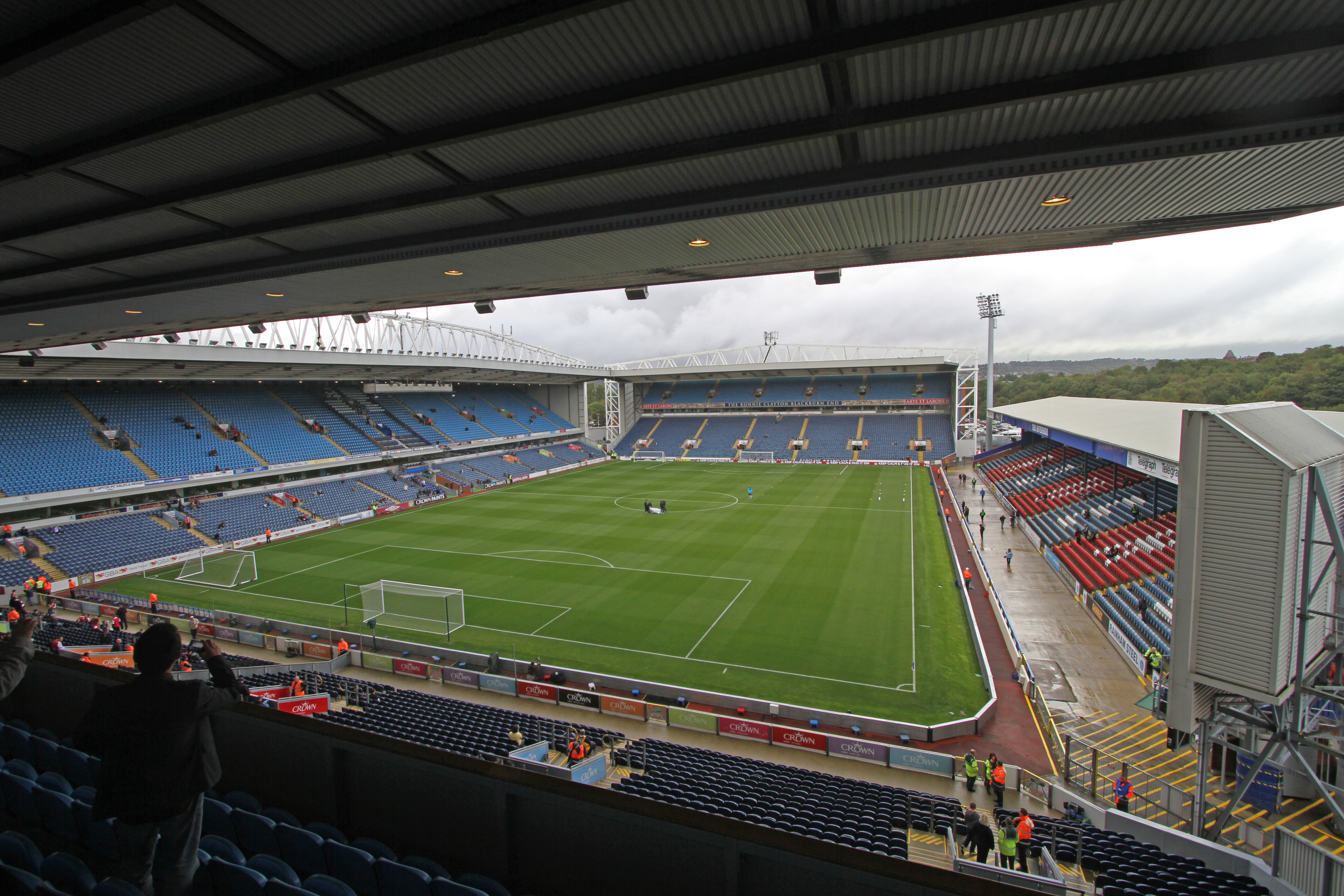
- Ewood Park, Blackburn, England, where the final was held
- Event: UEFA Women's Euro 2005
Germany	Norway
(Germany)	(Norway)
3	1
- Date: 19 June 2005
- Venue: Ewood Park, Blackburn, England
- Referee: Alexandra Ihringová (Slovakia)
- Attendance: 21,105

The final of UEFA Women's Euro 2005 was held on 19 June 2005 at Ewood Park in Blackburn, England. The match was won by the defending champions Germany, who earned their fourth consecutive European title – and fifth in total – with a 3–1 win over Norway.

== Route to the final ==
=== Germany ===
Germany were placed in Group B, along with France, Italy and Norway. Germany opened the first group game with a narrow 1-0 victory over Norway. Three days later Germany defeated Italy 4-0 with goals in the first half by Birgit Prinz and Conny Pohlers, and Steffi Jones and Anja Mittag in the second half. On the third and final group match, Germany won decisively against France with goals from Inka Grings, Renate Lingor and Sandra Minnert securing their place in top position in Group B. On 15 June, in the semi-finals, the Germans defeated Finland in Preston 4-1 with a double by Inka Grings and goals by Conny Pohlers and Birgit Prinz.

=== Norway ===
Norway were placed in Group B, along with France, Italy and Germany. On 6 June, the Germans and Norwegians faced each other in the opening match of Group B; the defending champions won thanks to Conny Pohlers's goal after an hour of the match.

Norway drew 1-1 against France; after coming from behind due to Stéphanie Mugneret-Béghé's goal, the Norwegians equalized in the second half thanks to a goal scored by Isabell Herlovsen. With Germany having secured Group B, Norway had to win to guarantee a place in the semi-finals which they did by defeating Italy 5-3 ending the group in second place on equal points with France but went through due to superior goal difference; eliminating France and Italy. On 16 June, the Norwegians faced Sweden in an all-Scandinavian match; the Norwegians took the lead with Solveig Gulbrandsen at the end of the first half, but the Swedes equalized through Hanna Ljungberg. In the second half the Norwegians took the lead again with Isabell Herlovsen's goal but with a minute from the end of the match another goal was scored by Ljungberg. The match was decided in extra time by another goal by Solveig Gulbrandsen in the 109th minute. It ended 3-2.

== Match ==
=== Summary ===
The final began with Germany started in dominating fashion when they gained a 2-0 led after 24 minutes when first Inka Grings and then Renate Lingor scored.

It seems like a straight forward victory for Germany, but Norway reorganized and Dagny Mellgren halved the deficit at the end of the first half and just before the interval a goal by Stine Frantzen was cancelled out for offside and Silke Rottenberg had to save a shot by Solveig Gulbrandsen.

At the beginning of the second half Rottenberg had to make another great save by repelling a shot from Lise Klaveness's distance, but Norway's hopes of a comeback were extinguished when a shot from Birgit Prinz's shot from distance deflected by Stangeland deceived Nordby bringing the result to 3-1.

The match ended 3-1 to secure Germany's fourth consecutive European title and sixth in its last eight tournaments.

== Final ==
19 June 2005
15:15 BST

Germany	3–1	Norway
Grings 21'; Lingor 24'; Prinz 63'	(Report)	Mellgren 41'

Ewood Park, Blackburn
Attendance: 21,105
Referee: Alexandra Ihringová (Slovakia)

GERMANY:
GK	1	Silke Rottenberg
DF	4	Steffi Jones
FW	6	Inka Grings	(substituted off) 68'
FW	9	Birgit Prinz (c)
MF	10	Renate Lingor
FW	11	Anja Mittag	(substituted off) 58'
DF	13	Sandra Minnert
MF	14	Britta Carlson	(substituted off) 81'
MF	16	Conny Pohlers
DF	17	Ariane Hingst
MF	18	Kerstin Garefrekes
Substitutes:
FW	20	Petra Wimbersky	(substituted on) 58'
FW	8	Sandra Smisek	(substituted on) 68'
DF	5	Sarah Günther	(substituted on) 81'
Manager:
Tina Theune

NORWAY:
GK	1	Bente Nordby
DF	2	Ane Stangeland (c)
DF	3	Gunhild Følstad
DF	4	Ingvild Stensland
DF	6	Marit Christensen
MF	7	Trine Rønning	(substituted off) 83'
MF	8	Solveig Gulbrandsen
FW	14	Dagny Mellgren
DF	17	Marianne Paulsen
FW	19	Stine Frantzen	(substituted off) 59'
FW	20	Lise Klaveness	(substituted off) 87'
Substitutes:
FW	9	Isabell Herlovsen	(substituted on) 59'
MF	18	Marie Knutsen	(substituted on) 83'
FW	16	Kristin Blystad-Bjerke	(substituted on) 87'
Manager:
Bjarne Berntsen

MATCH OFFICIALS

- Assistant referees:
  - Blaženka Logarušić (Croatia)
  - Yolanda Parga Rodríguez (Spain)
- Fourth official: Dagmar Damková (Czech Republic)

== Aftermath ==
Tina Theune-Mayer praised the Germany's toughness. Theune praised Norway putting up a good match. The final would prove to be Theune-Mayers last game as a coach of the national team. Since Germany had won the trophy three times they were allowed to permanently keep it.
