= UEFA Women's Euro 1997 final =

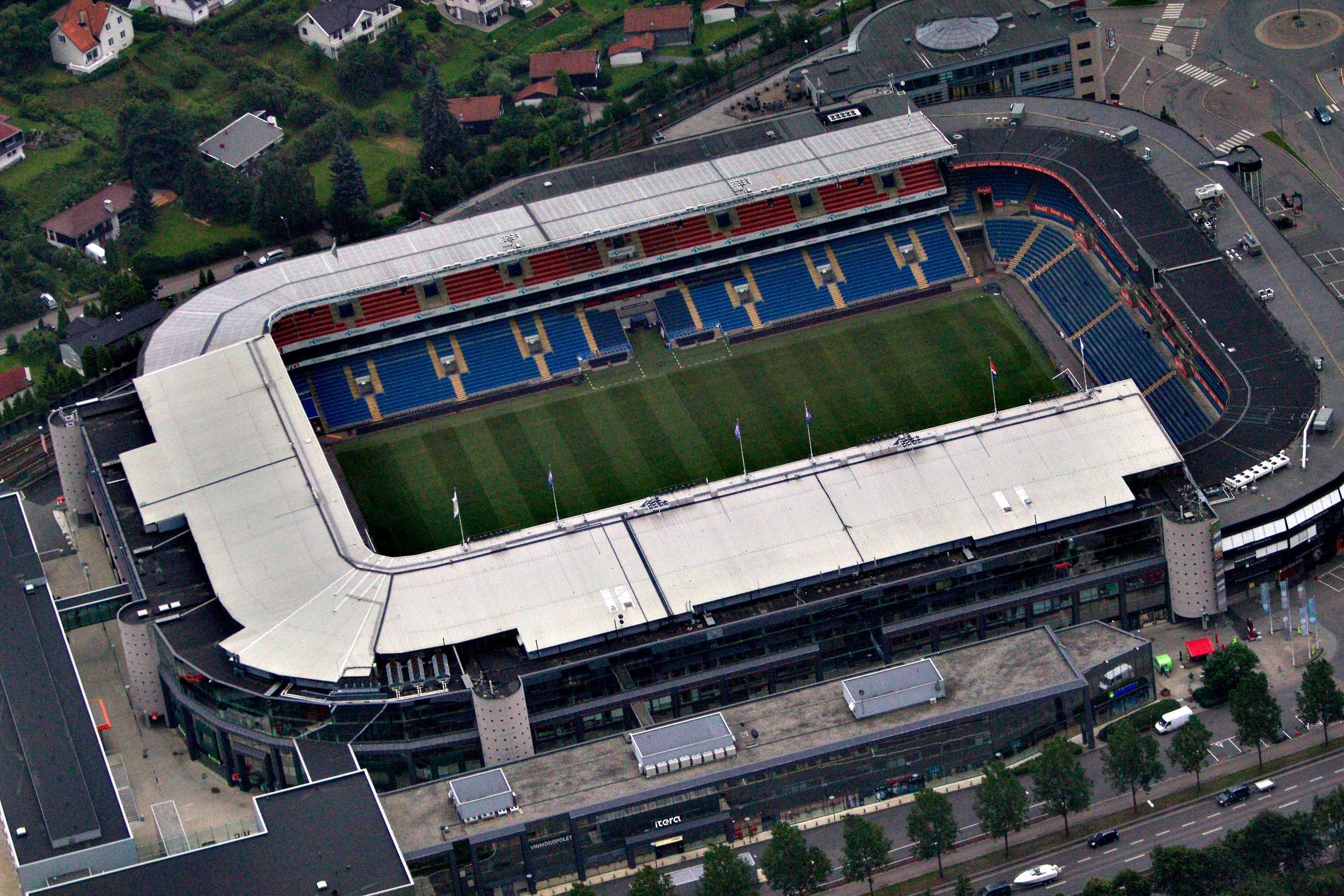
- Ullevaal Stadion, Oslo, Norway, where the final was held (pictured here in 2012)
- Event: UEFA Women's Euro 1997
Italy	Germany
(Italy)	(Germany)
0	2
- Date: 12 July 1997
- Venue: Ullevaal Stadion, Oslo, Norway
- Referee: Gitte Lyngo-Nielsen (Denmark)

The final of UEFA Women's Euro 1997 was held on 12 July 1997 at Ullevaal Stadion, Oslo, Norway. Germany won the match, beating Italy 2–0.

== Background ==
=== Germany ===
Germany defeated Sweden in the semi-final to reach the final.

== Match ==
=== Summary ===
Germany won comfortably against Italy 2–0.

== Final ==
12 July 1997
20:30

Italy	0–2	Germany
	DFB Report (in German); FIGC Report (in Italian); Report	Minnert 23'; Prinz 50'

Ullevaal Stadion, Oslo
Attendance: 2,221
Referee: Gitte Lyngo-Nielsen (Denmark)
