= UEFA Women's Euro 2022 final =

Final of the 13th edition of the UEFA Women's Championship

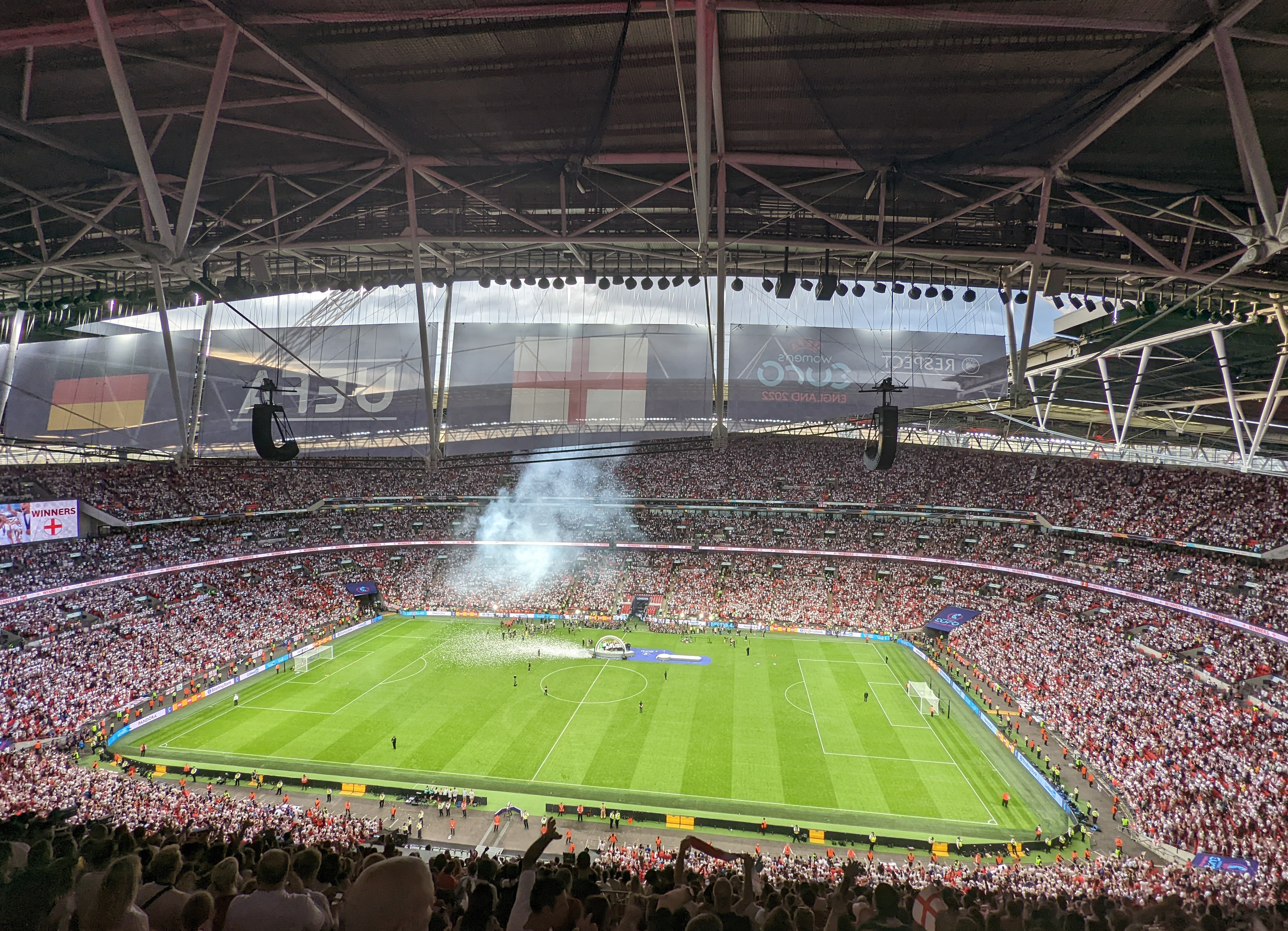
- Wembley Stadium during the final
- Event: UEFA Women's Euro 2022
England	Germany
(England)	(Germany)
2	1
- After extra time
- Date: 31 July 2022
- Venue: Wembley Stadium, London
- Player of the Match: Keira Walsh (England)
- Referee: Kateryna Monzul (Ukraine)
- Attendance: 87,192
- Weather: Partly cloudy 25 °C (77 °F); 54% humidity

The final of UEFA Women's Euro 2022 took place on 31 July 2022 at Wembley Stadium in London, England. The match was contested between hosts England, who won, and Germany.

For England, this was their third appearance in a European Championship final and the first since 2009, when they lost to Germany. England also lost in their first final in 1984, when Sweden beat them 4–3 on penalties. For Germany, the record winners of the competition, this was their ninth appearance in a Euro final and the first since 2013, when they defeated Norway. Germany won all eight of the previous European Championship finals they had played in.

The final took place in front of a sold-out crowd of 87,192, a record attendance for a women's international fixture in Europe and for any European Championship finals match. England won the match 2–1 after extra time for their first European Championship title; first women's European Championship title; first major women's international title; and the first time a senior England side had won a major football tournament since the 1966 FIFA World Cup, in which they also defeated Germany at Wembley. The England team received numerous individual and collective honours.

A match of equal chances and determined play, both regular time goals were scored in the second half; the first was set up by England's Keira Walsh, who would be named player of the match. The promotion of the tournament by the host nation, given further visibility by their win in the final, saw women's football claim a mainstream level of popularity in Europe; attendances at regular season games in both England and Germany grew massively, while the final became iconic of the sport's growth, and clubs spent more money on players and games.

== Venue ==
Wembley Stadium in London hosted the final.

The match was held at London's Wembley Stadium, in Wembley of the London Borough of Brent. Wembley Stadium opened in 2007 on the site of the original Wembley Stadium, the demolition of which took place between 2002 and 2003. Owned by the Football Association (FA), it serves as the national football stadium for the England men's team. The stadium was a host venue of the men's Euro 2020, including the final (which the England men's also contested). The original stadium, formerly known as the Empire Stadium, opened in 1923 and hosted football matches at the 1966 men's World Cup, including the final – which saw hosts England beat West Germany 4–2 after extra time – and at men's Euro 1996, including the final, in which Germany defeated the Czech Republic. Wembley also hosts the annual men's FA Cup final, doing so since the White Horse final of 1923 (excluding 2001 to 2006, when the stadium was being rebuilt), as well as the Women's FA Cup final since 2015.

== Route to the final ==
=== England ===
England's route to the final
	Opponent	Result
1	Austria	1–0
2	Norway	8–0
3	Northern Ireland	5–0
QF	Spain	2–1 (a.e.t.)
SF	Sweden	4–0

Having been selected as host for the UEFA Women's Euro 2022, England automatically qualified as the host nation for the tournament. Throughout the history of the Women's Euro prior to 2022, England's Lionesses have reached the final twice and finished as runner-up on both occasions, first in the inaugural edition in 1984 when they lost to Sweden on penalties and then in 2009, losing 2–6 to Germany.

As host, England were seeded in group A, along with Austria, two-time champions Norway and debutant Northern Ireland. The Lionesses began their quest for their first European title by defeating Austria 1–0. England then set a goal difference record against Norway by beating them 8–0, a record win in either Women's or Men's Euro. Boosted by the record win over Norway, the hosts went on to beat Northern Ireland 5–0 to finish top of the group with a perfect record and no goals conceded, setting up a quarter-finals encounter against Spain. In their quarter-final, England conceded their first goal in this Euro by a goal from Esther González, equalising towards the end of regulation time with a goal from Ella Toone to take the game to extra-time; a strike from Georgia Stanway sealed a 2–1 win for England, taking them to a semi-finals match against Sweden. In their semi-final, England beat Sweden 4–0, including a backheel goal by Alessia Russo and a mistake by Hedvig Lindahl, to see England through to the finals for the first time since 2009.

=== Germany ===
Germany's route to the final
	Opponent	Result
1	Denmark	4–0
2	Spain	2–0
3	Finland	3–0
QF	Austria	2–0
SF	France	2–1

As Europe's most decorated women's team, Germany is also the record holder of Euro titles, having triumphed eight times, including the 6–2 win over England in 2009. In the UEFA Women's Euro 2022 qualifying, Germany was drawn in group I, along with Ukraine, Republic of Ireland, Greece and Montenegro; they took a perfect eight wins out of eight to qualify for the tournament held in England.

In the main tournament, Germany was drawn in group B, alongside Spain, Denmark and Finland. Germany beat 2017 runners-up Denmark, who defeated them in that edition's quarter-finals, 4–0. They then defeated Spain 2–0 to top the group, before taking a 3–0 win against Finland, also with a perfect record and no goals conceded. Germany then beat Austria in the quarter-finals 2–0 to get a spot in the semi-finals, where they faced France. In their semi-finals, Germany conceded their first goal in the tournament due to an own goal by goalkeeper Merle Frohms, but took the win with two goals from Alexandra Popp, returning to the finals for the first time since 2013.

== Pre-match ==
=== Officials ===
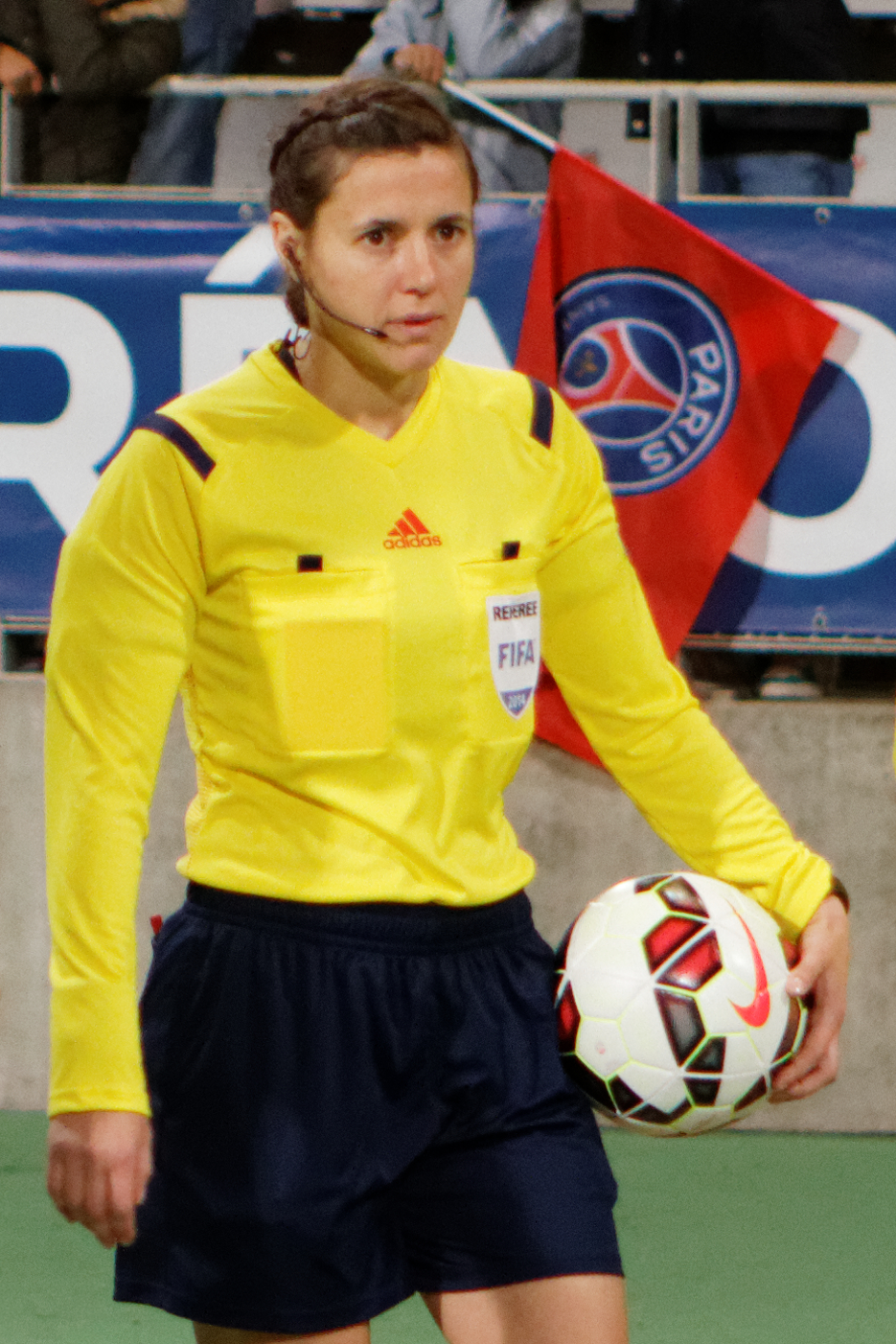
Kateryna Monzul of Ukraine was the referee for the final.

On 29 July 2022, the UEFA Referees Committee announced the officiating team for the final, led by 41-year-old Ukrainian referee Kateryna Monzul of the Ukrainian Association of Football. She was joined by her compatriot Maryna Striletska as one of the assistant referees, serving alongside Paulina Baranowska of Poland. Frenchwoman Stéphanie Frappart, who refereed the 2019 Women's World Cup Final, was selected as the fourth official, while Karolin Kaivoja of Estonia served as the reserve assistant referee. Paolo Valeri of Italy was appointed as the video assistant referee, the first use of the technology in the final of a UEFA Women's Championship. He was joined by fellow countryman Maurizio Mariani as one of the assistant VAR officials, serving alongside Pol van Boekel of the Netherlands.

Monzul is a native of Kharkiv, having to flee the country with her family to Germany following the 2022 Russian invasion of Ukraine. Though football was suspended in Ukraine, she wished to continue her officiating career. Following discussions with the Italian Football Federation and Italian Referees Association, she was able to resume refereeing in Italy, officiating in the Serie A Femminile and the men's youth league. Her compatriot and assistant referee Maryna Striletska, from Luhansk, similarly left the country for Switzerland, officiating in the men's third-tier Promotion League.

Monzul had been a FIFA referee since 2004 and was the first Ukrainian referee to officiate a UEFA Women's Championship final. UEFA Women's Euro 2022 was her ninth major international tournament, after the UEFA Women's Championship in 2009, 2013 and 2017, the FIFA Women's World Cup in 2011 (as fourth official), 2015 and 2019 and the Women's Olympic Football Tournament in 2016 and 2020. Monzul officiated three matches earlier in the tournament: Spain vs Finland and Austria vs Norway in the group stage and the quarter-final between Sweden and Belgium. The match was her third major international final, having previously officiated the 2014 UEFA Women's Champions League Final between Tyresö FF of Sweden and VfL Wolfsburg of Germany and the 2015 FIFA Women's World Cup Final between the United States and Japan.

In 2016, Monzul began officiating in the men's Ukrainian Premier League, the first woman to do so. She has also been appointed to matches in the UEFA Europa League and UEFA Europa Conference League. In November 2020, she officiated a UEFA Nations League fixture between San Marino and Gibraltar as part of the first all-female refereeing team to take charge of a senior men's international match.

=== Team selection ===
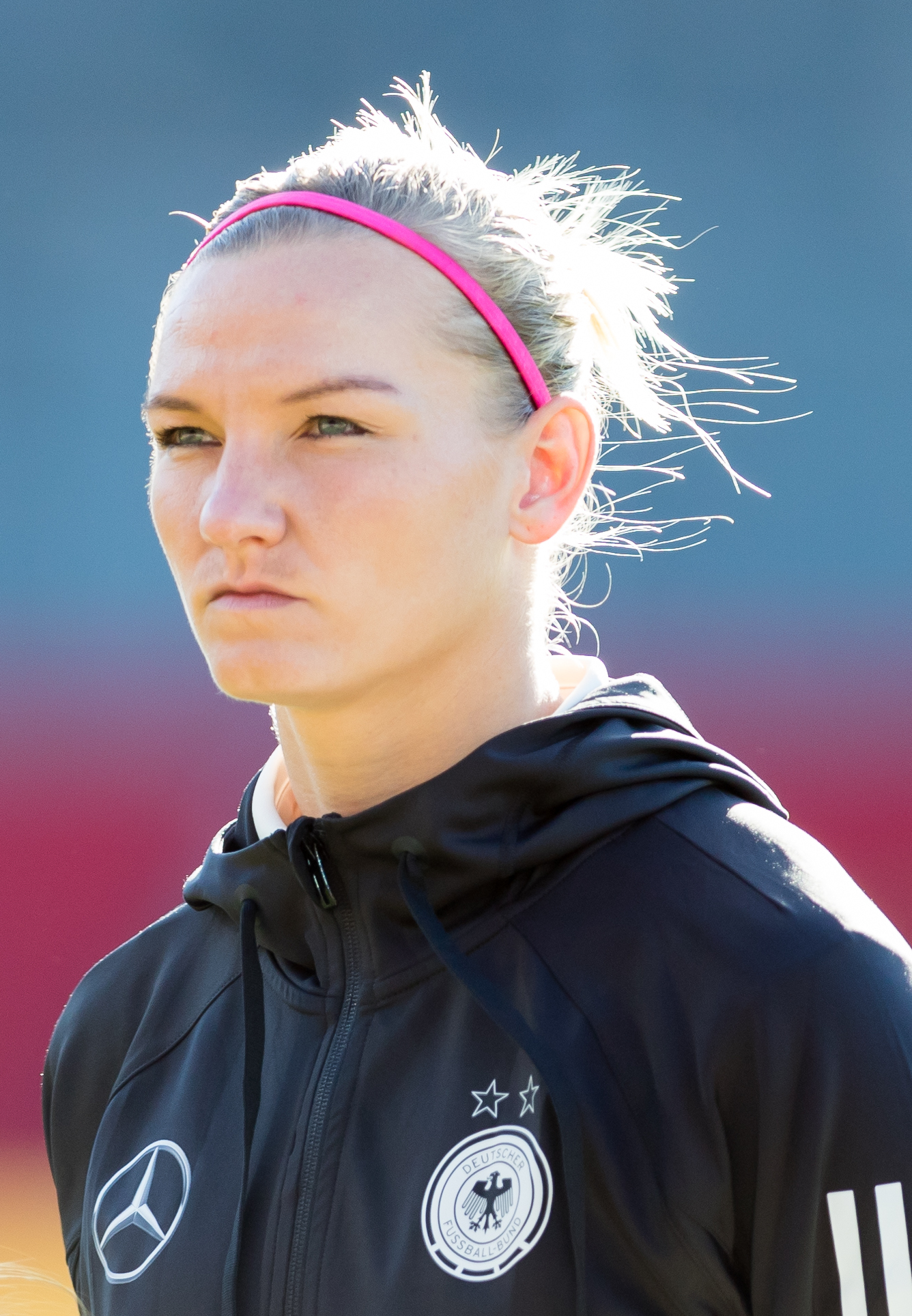
Germany captain and top scorer Alexandra Popp withdrew injured shortly before kick-off.

England had their entire squad available for selection in the final. For Germany, forward Klara Bühl was ruled out of the final by manager Martina Voss-Tecklenburg after testing positive for SARS-CoV-2 prior to the semi-final against France. Jule Brand subsequently took her place in the starting line-up. However, Bühl was able to still attend the match as a spectator after testing negative on the day of the final. Forward Lea Schüller had also tested positive for the virus after starting in Germany's opening fixture against Denmark. However, she exited isolation prior to the team's quarter-final match against Austria, but had lost her starting spot to captain Popp. The day before the final, Popp suffered a "slight [muscular] strain" according to Germany national team director Oliver Bierhoff, but wanted to wait until the pre-match warm-up to see if she was fit; this information was not announced prior to the match.

Both teams initially named unchanged sides from their respective semi-final victories and maintained the same formations: a 4–2–3–1 for England and a 4–3–3 for Germany. For England, this meant that manager Sarina Wiegman had named the same starting line-up in all six matches of the competition, a first in the history of the women's or men's European Championship. Minutes prior to kick-off, Popp, the joint-leading scorer in the tournament, who had scored in all five matches, withdrew from the starting line-up injured due to her muscular issue resurfacing during the warm-up. She was replaced by Schüller, the top scorer of the 2021–22 Frauen-Bundesliga who had been named Women's Footballer of the Year in Germany hours earlier by Kicker. Svenja Huth was named as captain in place of Popp, who sat on the team bench but was not available as a substitute.

=== Closing ceremony ===
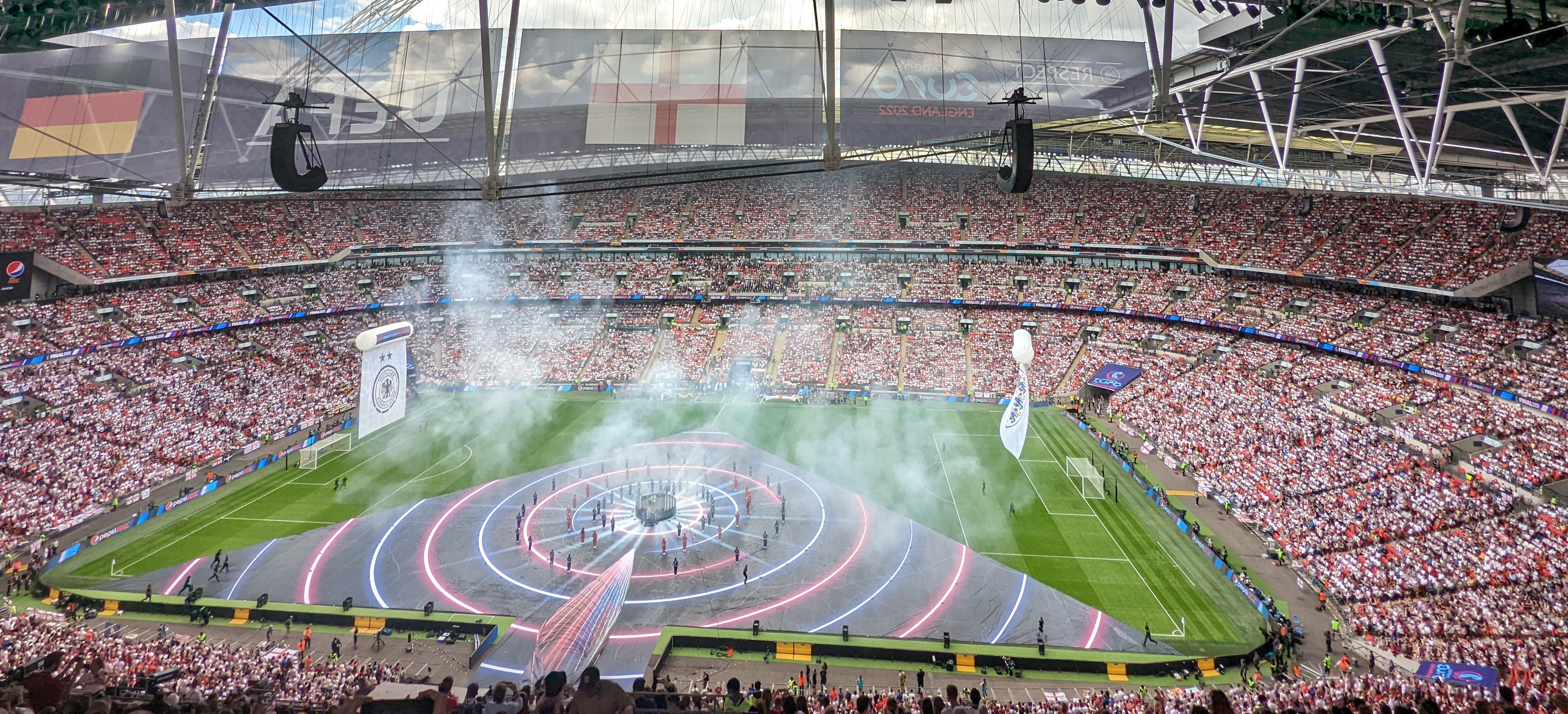
Closing ceremony of Euro 2022

British singer Becky Hill performed at the closing ceremony before the start of the match. She performed her songs "Crazy What Love Can Do", "My Heart Goes (La Di Da)" and "Remember", before inviting Ultra Naté on stage to perform a rendition of Naté's song "Free" along with Stefflon Don.

A flypast over Wembley performed by an all-female Royal Air Force team took place before the kick-off.

== Match ==
=== Summary ===
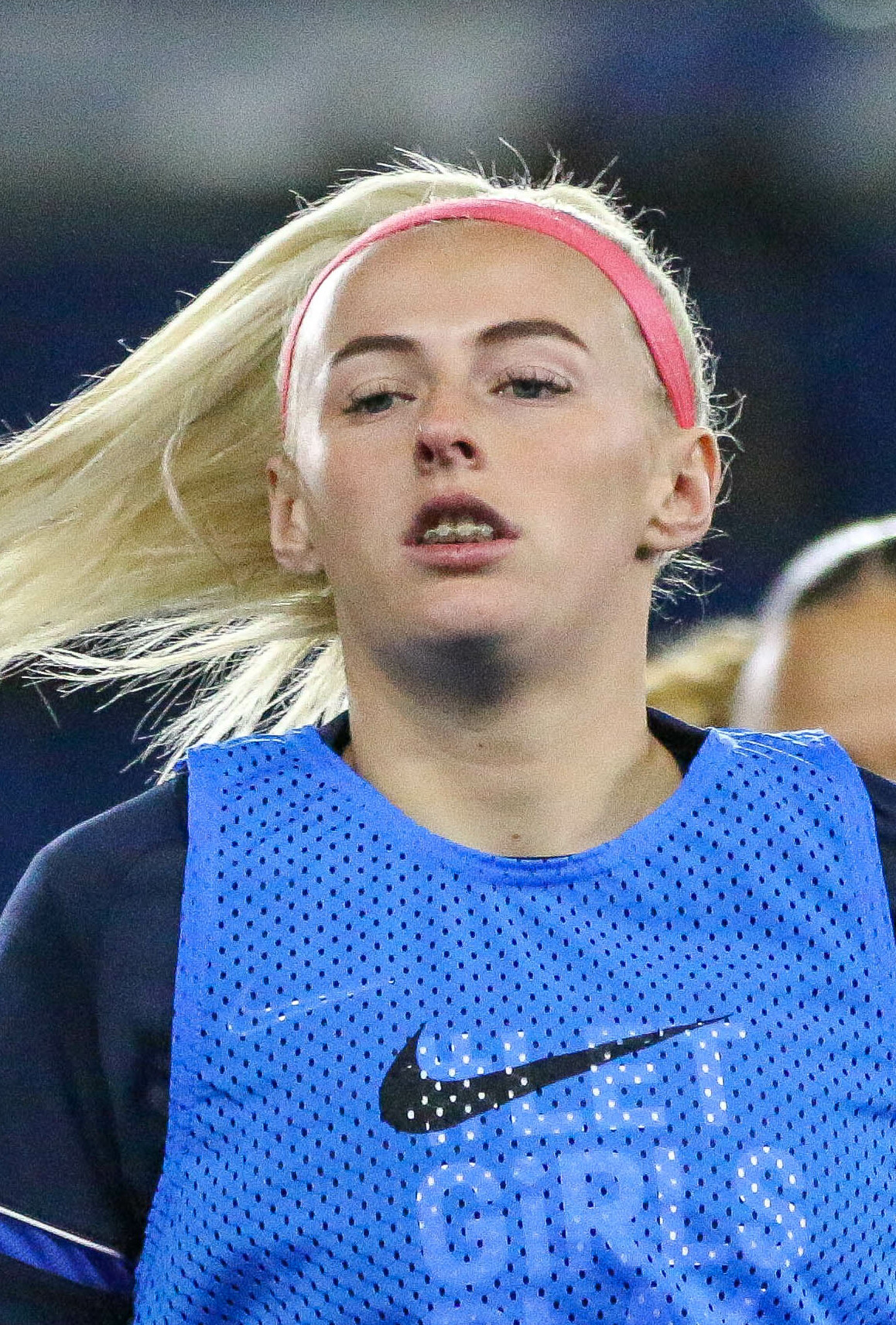
Chloe Kelly scored the decisive goal for England in extra time.

The match kicked off at 17:00 local time (BST) in front of 87,192 spectators. This set an attendance record both for a women's international fixture in Europe and for a match in the final tournament of a UEFA women's or men's national team competition. Ellen White had an early chance for England, but headed straight at German goalkeeper Frohms; White then picked up an early yellow card, as did teammate Stanway. In the 25th minute a goalmouth scramble nearly resulted in a goal for Germany, before England goalkeeper Mary Earps gathered the ball. An appeal for a penalty because the ball had struck England captain Leah Williamson's arm was turned down; moments later at the other end of the pitch there were similar appeals for a penalty after the ball struck German forward Schüller's arm, which was also denied. White missed another chance just before half-time, sending the ball over the bar, with the first half ending goalless. Germany made a substitution at half-time, replacing Brand with Tabea Waßmuth.

Five minutes into the second half, Lina Magull missed a chance for Germany, sending the ball just wide of the post. In the 55th minute, England made two substitutions, replacing Fran Kirby and White with Toone and Russo. Toone gave England the lead seven minutes later: a long ball from Keira Walsh sent Toone clear of the defence and she chipped the ball over Frohms. The tournament's top goalscorer, England's Beth Mead, had been injured and taken off just before the goal, being replaced by Chloe Kelly after it was scored. Germany nearly equalised almost straight away when Magull hit a close shot, deflected by Earps' fingertips onto the bar and away, with Earps also saving the follow-up attempt from Schüller. Magull then brought the match level after 79 minutes, flicking the ball into the goal after receiving a cross from Waßmuth. This took the match to extra time with the score at 1–1.

There were few chances of note in the first half of extra time. In the second period, England took the lead, scoring in the 110th minute of the match. A corner by Lauren Hemp bounced off Lucy Bronze into the path of Kelly, who stabbed the ball in at the second attempt. England then managed the game well for the remaining 11 minutes, performing what The Athletic described as a "masterclass of time-wasting": keeping possession efficiently and using the corner to give the Germans no chance to equalise. Extra time ended 2–1 to give England their first major international trophy. It was the second consecutive Euros win for manager Wiegman, who won the previous Euros managing her native Netherlands.

=== Details ===
31 July 2022
17:00 BST

England	2–1 (a.e.t.)	Germany
Toone 62'; Kelly 110'	Report	Magull 79'

Wembley Stadium, London
Attendance: 87,192
Referee: Kateryna Monzul (Ukraine)

England	Germany

GK	1	Mary Earps
RB	2	Lucy Bronze
CB	6	Millie Bright
CB	8	Leah Williamson (c)
LB	3	Rachel Daly		(substituted off) 88'
CM	10	Georgia Stanway	(yellow card) 23'	(substituted off) 88'
CM	4	Keira Walsh
RW	7	Beth Mead		(substituted off) 63'
AM	14	Fran Kirby		(substituted off) 55'
LW	11	Lauren Hemp		(substituted off) 120'
CF	9	Ellen White	(yellow card) 24'	(substituted off) 55'
Substitutions:
MF	20	Ella Toone		(substituted on) 55'
FW	23	Alessia Russo	(yellow card) 100'	(substituted on) 55'
FW	18	Chloe Kelly	(yellow card) 111'	(substituted on) 63'
DF	5	Alex Greenwood		(substituted on) 88'
MF	16	Jill Scott		(substituted on) 88'
FW	17	Nikita Parris		(substituted on) 120'
Manager:
(Netherlands) Sarina Wiegman

GK	1	Merle Frohms
RB	15	Giulia Gwinn
CB	3	Kathrin Hendrich
CB	5	Marina Hegering		(substituted off) 103'
LB	17	Felicitas Rauch	(yellow card) 40'	(substituted off) 113'
CM	20	Lina Magull		(substituted off) 91'
CM	6	Lena Oberdorf	(yellow card) 57'
CM	13	Sara Däbritz		(substituted off) 73'
RF	9	Svenja Huth (c)
CF	7	Lea Schüller	(yellow card) 57'	(substituted off) 67'
LF	22	Jule Brand		(substituted off) 46'
Substitutions:
FW	18	Tabea Waßmuth		(substituted on) 46'
FW	14	Nicole Anyomi		(substituted on) 67'
MF	8	Sydney Lohmann		(substituted on) 73'
MF	16	Linda Dallmann		(substituted on) 91'
DF	23	Sara Doorsoun		(substituted on) 103'
MF	4	Lena Lattwein		(substituted on) 113'
Manager:
Martina Voss-Tecklenburg

Player of the Match:
Keira Walsh (England)

Assistant referees:
Maryna Striletska (Ukraine)
Paulina Baranowska (Poland)
Fourth official:
Stéphanie Frappart (France)
Reserve assistant referee:
Karolin Kaivoja (Estonia)
Video assistant referee:
Paolo Valeri (Italy)
Assistant video assistant referees:
Maurizio Mariani (Italy)
Pol van Boekel (Netherlands)

Match rules

- 90 minutes
- 30 minutes of extra time if necessary
- Penalty shoot-out if scores still level
- Maximum of twelve named substitutes
- Maximum of five substitutions, with a sixth allowed in extra time (Note: Each team was given only three opportunities to make substitutions, with a fourth opportunity in extra time, excluding substitutions made at half-time, before the start of extra time and at half-time in extra time.)

=== Statistics ===
First half
Statistic	England	Germany
Goals scored	0	0
Total shots	6	4
Shots on target	3	0
Saves	0	3
Ball possession	48%	52%
Corner kicks	5	2
Fouls committed	6	8
Offsides	2	1
Yellow cards	2	1
Red cards	0	0

Second half
Statistic	England	Germany
Goals scored	1	1
Total shots	2	9
Shots on target	2	3
Saves	2	1
Ball possession	52%	48%
Corner kicks	0	3
Fouls committed	7	9
Offsides	0	0
Yellow cards	0	2
Red cards	0	0

Extra time
Statistic	England	Germany
Goals scored	1	0
Total shots	5	3
Shots on target	3	1
Saves	1	2
Ball possession	56%	44%
Corner kicks	3	2
Fouls committed	7	5
Offsides	0	0
Yellow cards	2	0
Red cards	0	0

Overall
Statistic	England	Germany
Goals scored	2	1
Total shots	13	16
Shots on target	8	4
Saves	3	6
Ball possession	52%	48%
Corner kicks	8	7
Fouls committed	20	22
Offsides	2	1
Yellow cards	4	3
Red cards	0	0

== Post-match ==
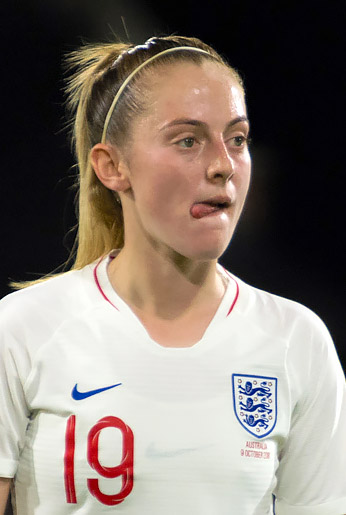
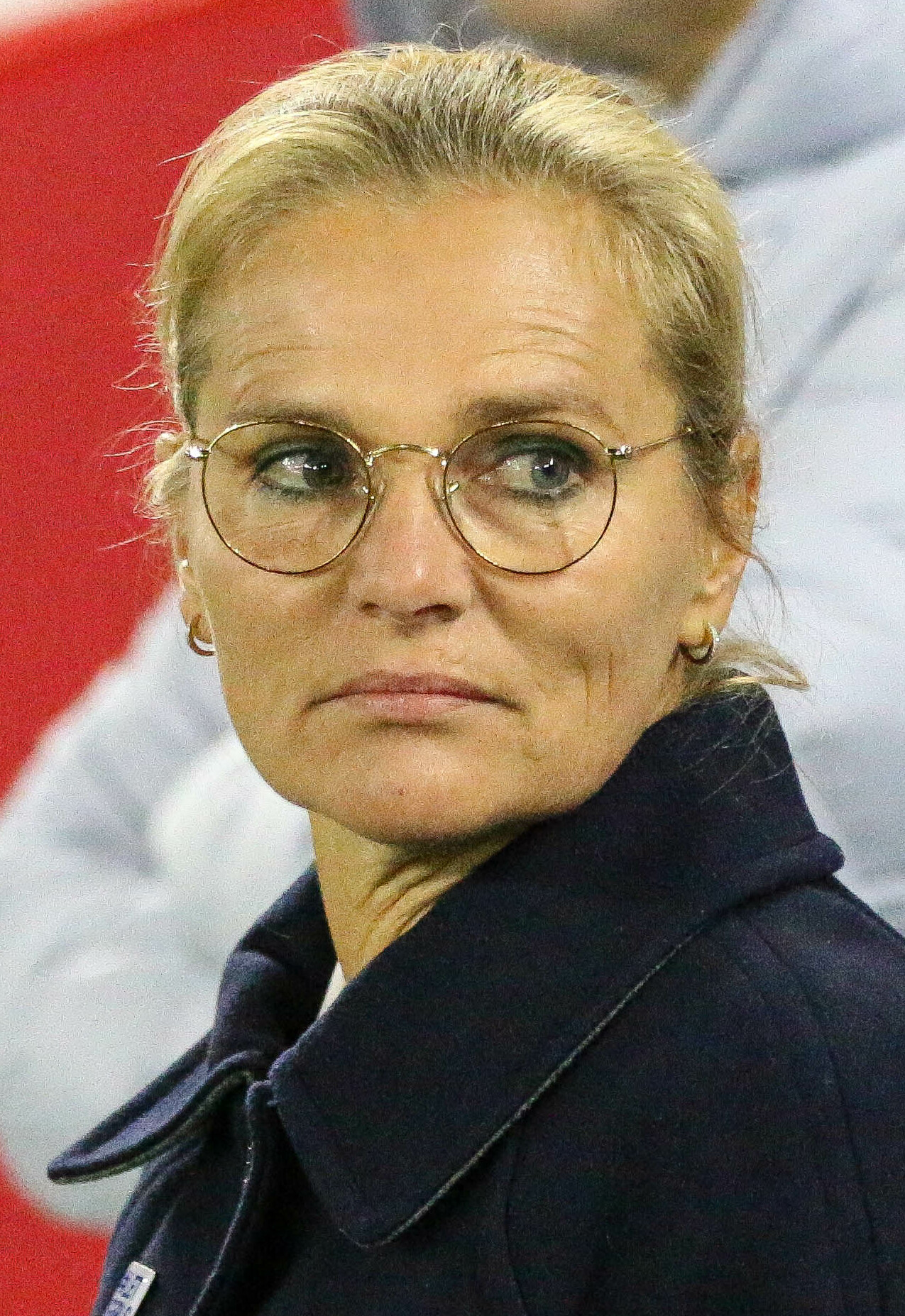
England's Keira Walsh (left) was named as the player of the match for the final. England manager Sarina Wiegman (right) won a second consecutive UEFA Women's Championship, the first to do so with two different countries.

=== Records ===
After the England men's team lost in the UEFA Euro 2020 final a year earlier, the success of the women's team brought England their first Euro victory, as well as their first major international honour since 1966. It is the England women's first Euro title after two previous defeats in the final. The crowd at Wembley totalled 87,192, a record attendance for a women's international fixture in Europe and for a European Championship finals match, women's or men's.

Bronze became the first English player to achieve an international title at both junior and senior level, having won the Euro under-19 title in 2009. (Note: At the 2009 U19 tournament, Bronze was listed as Lucia Bronze. Demi Stokes was a substitute in the 2009 U19 team and was an unused member of the team at Euro 2022.) England manager Sarina Wiegman became the first manager to win the Women's or Men's Euro with two different countries, having led her native Netherlands to the title in 2017.

For Germany, this became their first loss in a Women's Euro final, having won all eight titles in their eight previous grand final appearances.

With England's two goals in the final, they overtook Germany as the highest-scoring women's team in a single tournament, with 22 goals at Euro 2022 against Germany's 21 at Euro 2009.

=== Honours ===
English midfielder Keira Walsh was named the player of the match for the final. Teammate Beth Mead was named the player of the tournament by UEFA's technical observers and became the tournament's top scorer with six goals; Germany's Alexandra Popp also scored six goals, but had no assists compared to Mead's five. German midfielder Lena Oberdorf won the inaugural young player of the tournament award, open to players born on or after 1 January 1999. Walsh, Mead, Popp and Oberdorf were among the players named to the Team of the Tournament; largely comprising England and Germany players, of those who played in the final, goalkeeper Mary Earps and defenders Giulia Gwinn, Leah Williamson, and Marina Hegering, were also included. England's first goal in the final, scored by Ella Toone with an assist from Walsh, was named the #10 goal of the tournament by UEFA's technical panel; it was voted the #2 goal of the tournament by fans.

On 1 August, the day following the final, the England team celebrated their victory with thousands of supporters at Trafalgar Square, with the players "looking commendably the worse for wear". The German team were celebrated as runners-up at the Römer in Frankfurt on the same day.

At Trafalgar Square, presenter and former player Alex Scott interviewed members of the England team, who then sang "Three Lions", "Sweet Caroline", "Freed from Desire" and "River Deep – Mountain High". Lord Mayor of London Vincent Keaveny and Edward Lord of the City of London Corporation announced during the celebration that they would give all 23 members of the team and Wiegman the Freedom of the City of London. Various players were honoured by being offered the freedom of their home districts, including the three involved in the winning goal, captain Williamson and player of the match Walsh. (Note: Hemp was given the freedom of North Walsham; Northumberland County Council said it would offer Lucy Bronze the Freedom of Northumberland; Ealing council announced that they would offer Chloe Kelly the freedom of the borough; Williamson was given the freedom of the city of Milton Keynes, the first person to receive the honour; Walsh was given the freedom of the borough of Rochdale.) The Freedom of the City (or county; borough; town) in England is a traditional honour that, since the 1970s, is given at a council's discretion to "persons of distinction and persons who have, in the opinion of the council, rendered eminent services" to the area. Buses operating in the hometowns of many of the Lionesses were named after them. (Note: Arriva buses in Milton Keynes (Williamson), Aylesbury (White), Whitby (Mead), Sunderland (Jill Scott), Ashington (Bronze), Maidstone (Russo), Liverpool (Greenwood and Parris), Rochdale (Walsh) and Wigan and Leigh (Toone); a Rosso bus in Rochdale (Walsh); a Coastliner bus in Yorkshire (Mead); and a Harrogate Bus Company bus in Harrogate (Daly).)

In December at the BBC Sports Personality of the Year awards ceremony, Mead became the first female footballer to win the Sports Personality of the Year Award, with the team as a whole winning the Team of the Year Award and Wiegman becoming the first woman to win the Sports Personality of the Year Coach Award. For the 2022 The Best FIFA Football Awards (held in February 2023), Wiegman won The Best FIFA Women's Coach for the third time, while Earps became the first Englishwoman to win The Best FIFA Women's Goalkeeper. England was the most-represented national team in the FIFPro Women's World 11, with Williamson, Bronze, Walsh and Mead all included.

In the 2023 New Year Honours, captain Williamson was made an OBE; player of the tournament and top goalscorer Mead was made an MBE, as were Bronze and Ellen White for their careers; and manager Wiegman, under the Foreign Office with the permission of the Netherlands, was made an honorary CBE, all for services to football. The Honours Committee acknowledged the discrepancy of not including all members of the squad in the Order, explaining that they were left out as the European Championship was not a World Cup and only the extraordinary contributions at the Euro were being recognised. The British media noted that this was unlike other British and English international title-winning squads, who had previously all been honoured. (Note: For example in The Telegraph, and for BBC News and BBC Sport.)

In February 2024, Transport for London announced as part of the renaming of the London Overground lines that the Watford DC line from Watford Junction to Euston, which includes Wembley Central, would be renamed the Lioness line to reflect England's win and the increasing popularity of women's football.

=== Impact on women's football ===
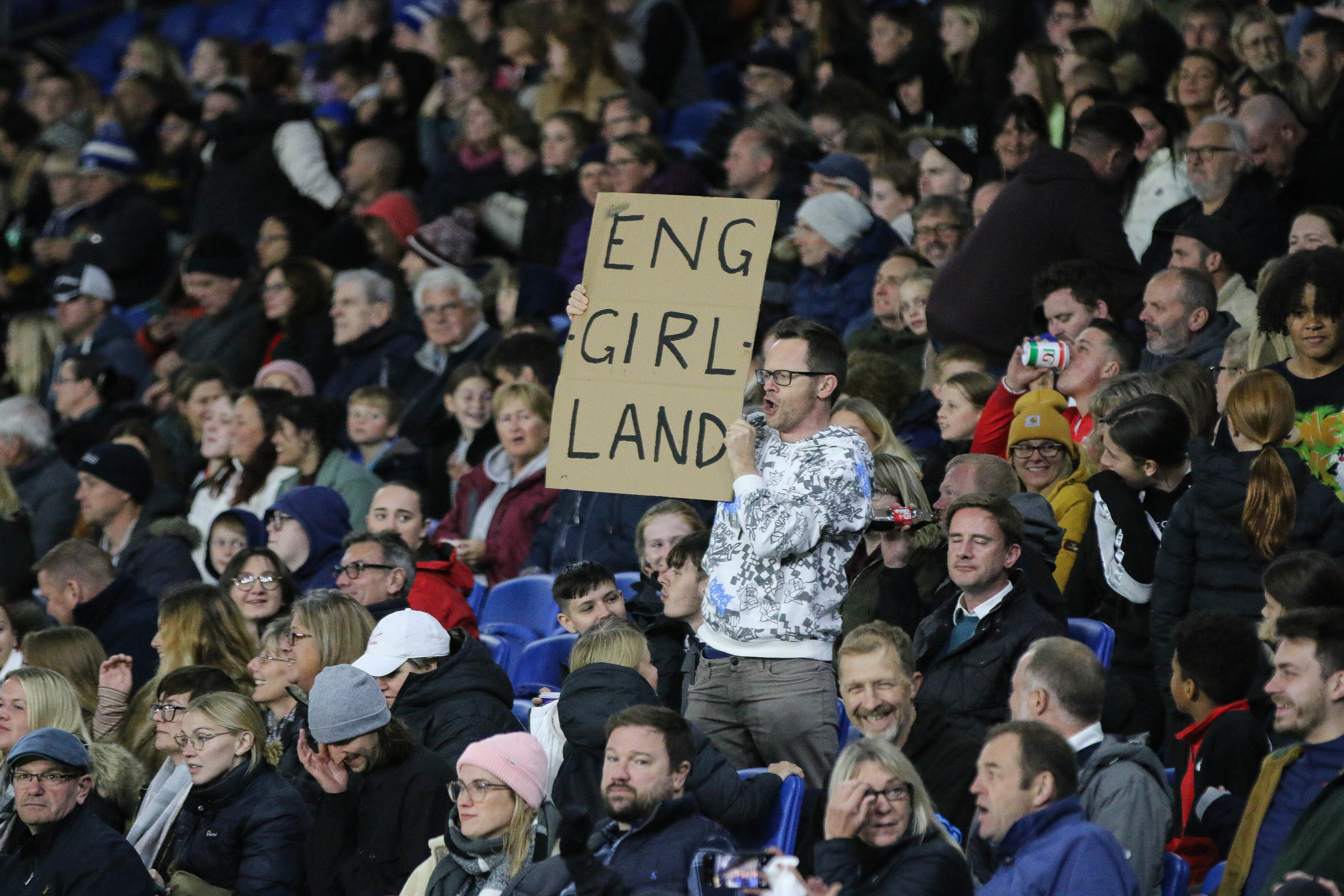
Support for women's football within the wider football culture grew. A member of the crowd at an England women's match in October 2022 is holding a sign reading "Eng-Girl-Land", a play on the popular "Eng-Ger-Land" football chant.

==== Popularity and attendance ====
The live UK television audience for the Euro final peaked at 17.4 million people on BBC One, making it the most-watched women's football game in the country's history. The game was also the most-watched programme in the UK in 2022 at the time. There were also 5.9 million BBC iPlayer viewers on the day, with the total live BBC audience compared to "some of the biggest men's games at major tournaments". The UK and Germany recorded their highest viewership figures for a women's Euro match, and the highest football viewership since Euro 2020. Global live audiences of the final totalled 50 million people. Season tickets to Women's Super League (WSL) club games saw large sale increases. Viewership and attendances of women's football matches grew significantly following the Euro final in Germany, as well; by the end of 2022, the Frauen-Bundesliga saw attendance figures 277% increased on 2021; the WSL had a 227% increase for the same period. The second-division English Women's Championship was also up 86%. A friendly between England and world champions the United States, announced shortly after the win, sold out in 24 hours, the fastest-selling women's match ever and the fastest sell-out of Wembley.

==== Image ====
Journalists, both in the immediate aftermath and in year-end retrospective, wrote that the profile of the 2022 Euro (and its winners) would be a landmark moment that changed women's football history forever. Women's football journalist Asif Burhan noted that "the women's game has reclaimed its position in the mainstream", a century after it was banned in England by the Football Association (FA). The England victory monopolised the front and back covers of British newspapers on 1 August, with the celebrations prominent in headlines of some major newspapers the day after. Williamson, speaking at Trafalgar Square after the match, said:

The legacy of the tournament was made before that final game. What we've done for women and girls who can look up and aspire to be us. I think we've hosted an incredible tournament but we wanted to make our legacy about winning and that's what we did.

— Leah Williamson, 1 August 2022

The friendly against the United States had been promptly organised after the US coach, Vlatko Andonovski, attended the Euro and said that the atmosphere "took the women's soccer game to the next level and raised standards around the world". He pushed for the friendly, and for it to be held at Wembley, so that his team could experience the environment.

Deutsche Welle (DW) reflected that while the growth of the WSL would likely be predicated on increased spending, which the Euro win prompted, it would also need the reputation of the women's game in England to be sustained, and that this may be hard to achieve during a period of transition. They also quoted Williamson saying that WSL teams should be competing in the UEFA Women's Champions League, with DW assessing that English football would be judged based on its teams' European success and not just by the international reputation boost of the national team.

The image of Chloe Kelly ripping off her shirt to celebrate the goal which won the tournament for the hosts, has become symbolic of how the women's game has thrown off the shackles of the restraints imposed upon it by society ever since the ban in 1921.

— Asif Burhan, Forbes, December 2022

After the Euro final, the goal celebration by Chloe Kelly – removing her shirt to reveal a sports bra and then swinging her shirt around her head – was praised as uniting and empowering women, as it showed a topless woman not as a sexual object but as an image of joy and of the power of female bodies and what women can achieve, as well as for showing the sports bra. Kelly received a yellow card for the move, as the rules outline, later describing it as "the best yellow card I've ever received". It was also congratulated by former US women's player Brandi Chastain, to whose iconic celebration Kelly's had been compared; Chastain had, like Kelly, removed her jersey to reveal her sports bra when she scored the decisive penalty for the United States in the 1999 Women's World Cup Final shootout. The team's photographer said that Kelly's "sports bra celebration" would be discussed for decades and that it was a privilege to capture the moment. Kelly and Chastain later swapped shirts after the England–United States friendly at Wembley in October 2022.

Queen Elizabeth II released a statement addressed to the team, saying:

The Championships and your performance in them have rightly won praise. However, your success goes far beyond the trophy you have so deservedly earned. You have all set an example that will be an inspiration for girls and women today and for future generations. It is my hope that you will be as proud of the impact you have had on your sport as you are of the result today.

— Elizabeth II, 31 July 2022

When Elizabeth II died on 8 September 2022, members of the squad shared condolences. Wiegman issued a long tribute, quoting back the Queen's message to the football team: "In that letter she called us an 'inspiration for girls and women'. It is you, your Majesty, who was the inspiration with your unrelenting work ethic, leadership, dignity and kindness."

==== Finance ====
Prior to the tournament, the Lionesses had brokered a deal with the FA, to see each player receive £55,000 if they won, on top of a reported £2,000 per match fee. PR experts explained that, following the win, female footballers would see more merchandising and sponsorship deals like their male counterparts. Advocates and managers of women's teams were hopeful that the high profile of the championship win would also lead investors to be less concerned about immediate profitability and so fund grassroots level women's football for the long term.

Winning the Euro made the England women's team not only more prominent players, but also more desirable ones at club level. When player of the match Walsh transferred in September 2022 from Manchester City to Barcelona for a world record fee, The Athletic wrote that the fee, which they described as increased because of the recent Euro win, would change the market of the women's game by setting a precedent to see more money invested and a competitive market emerge. The next transfer window, precipitated by Walsh's move, saw more players moving for paid transfers, and player prices "rocket up and up."

A Forbes article said that between the newfound popularity; record attendances of Champions League matches for Barcelona in the spring of 2022; and the paid transfer market growing, more clubs in England and Europe were recognising a financial imperative to play matches at bigger stadiums. However, it also feared that the sudden profile boost of women's football leading to such economic growth in the Champions League would not allow clubs in poorer nations the time to inject money into their domestic game, leaving them behind as Western European nations continue to develop at an increased rate.

=== Impact on other women's sports ===
In the days following the final, England's Rugby Football Union reported a 100% rise in tickets sales for the September internationals of the England women's national rugby union team (the Red Roses) against the United States and Wales. With the Red Roses among the favourites to win the 2021 Rugby World Cup (held in October and November 2022), the increased visibility of women's sport due to the Lionesses, paired with the success of the women's rugby team, was predicted to significantly increase the popularity of women's rugby union in England.

Television viewership of women's sports in the UK doubled from 2021 figures. The team that had prescribed fitted sports bras to the England women used the visibility from Kelly's celebration to give recommendations for finding better sports bras that could help make exercising more efficient and comfortable.

=== England–Germany rivalry ===
The English and German national teams have a long-standing rivalry. Prior to this final, England had never beaten Germany in a European final, while England's only prior international title was won by the men's team when they defeated West Germany in the final of the 1966 FIFA World Cup. In the women's game, the England–Germany rivalry had seen the Lionesses defeat Germany only twice. The England women's most recent European final in 2009 was lost to Germany. It was the nineteenth consecutive match that England lost to Germany at the time. In the 2015 FIFA Women's World Cup, England and Germany met in the third place play-off, with England winning for the women's first victory over Germany in the 31 years since their first meeting.

England player Georgia Stanway, who moved to play for Bayern Munich in Germany when the 2022 Euro concluded, said that "[an] England vs Germany [final] was something we wanted from the start, the Bayern girls were even cheering me on"; besides mutual hope for a match between the teams, Stanway also noted that the players on both sides have a lot of respect for each other. After defeating them in the final, Stanway was encouraged by her German club teammates to sing "Sweet Caroline" as her initiation song upon arriving in Munich.

German tabloid Bild accused the final of being rigged, comparing it to the 1966 Men's World Cup by saying that both times Wembley was used to guarantee England victory.

=== Aftermath ===
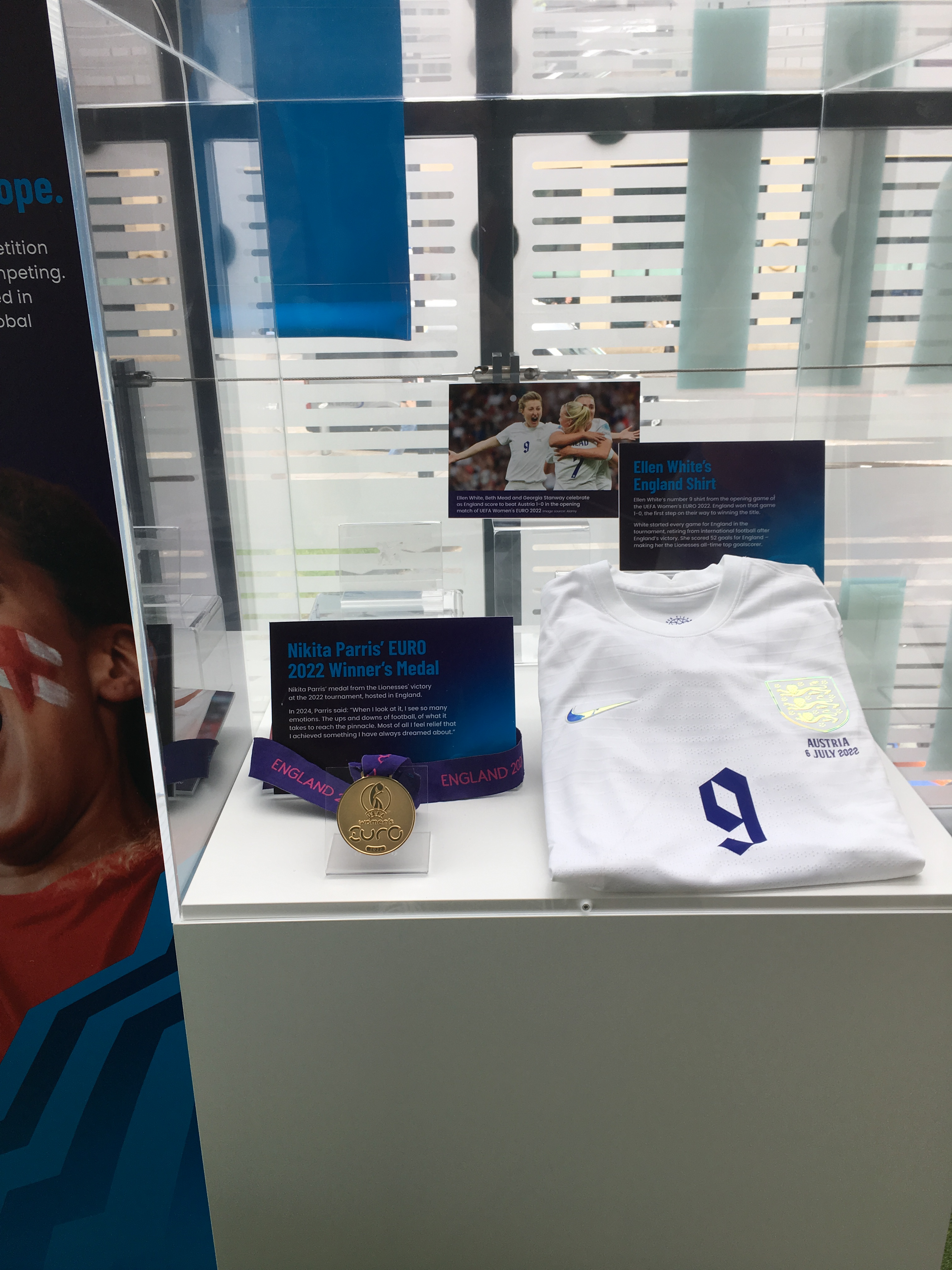
White's shirt and Parris' winners medal on display at the National Football Museum

Rishi Sunak and Liz Truss, the two candidates who were campaigning to become Prime Minister at the time of the final following the government crisis in July, both said they would endorse a bid for England to host a FIFA Women's World Cup on the morning after the final.

On 3 August, inspired by player Lotte Wubben-Moy, the England team published an open letter addressed to the prime ministerial candidates. The letter asked that whichever candidate won they would ensure access to physical education, and particularly football, for young and teenage girls. Though both responded, neither candidate pledged to meet the request. Truss won the July leadership contest, and subsequently met with the England women's team on 10 October 2022 to discuss improving access to football for girls; this was also the first prime ministerial meeting for the Lionesses since winning the Euro, as Truss's predecessor Boris Johnson had chosen not to attend the final and neglected to invite them for a winners' reception at 10 Downing Street. Truss, who did attend the final, would resign ten days later.

Following the final, Wiegman's post-match press conference was interrupted by the England players dancing into the room and singing the chorus of "Three Lions"; part of the audio and video of the moment was used in the music video for a remix version of the song, "Three Lions (It's Coming Home for Christmas)", in the lyrics of which the Lionesses' win is also mentioned.

As winners of the Women's Euro, England qualified for the inaugural edition of the UEFA–CONMEBOL Women's Finalissima, a one-off match in which they faced Brazil, winners of the equivalent South American championship, the 2022 Copa América Femenina. The match is part of a renewed partnership between CONMEBOL and UEFA. The Finalissima took place at Wembley on 6 April 2023, which was also won by England after beating Brazil in a penalty shootout.
