= 1989 European Competition for Women's Football final =

- Event: 1989 European Competition for Women's Football
Germany	Norway
(Germany)	(Norway)
4	1
- Venue: Stadion an der Bremer Brücke, Osnabrück
- Referee: Carlos Silva Valente (Portugal)
- Attendance: 22,000

The 1989 European Competition for Women's Football final was an association football match on 2 July 1989 at Fritz-Walter-Stadion in Osnabrück, West Germany, to determine the winner of 1989 European Competition for Women's Football.

== Background ==
=== Germany ===
Germany defeated Italy via a penalty shootout in the semi-finals to reach the final.

== Match ==
=== Summary ===
Germany (then known as West Germany) won against Norway 4-1.

== Final ==
2 July 1989

West Germany	4–1	Norway
Lohn 22', 36'; Mohr 45'; Fehrmann 73'	Report; DFB Report (in German); NFF Report (in Norwegian); Report	Grude 54'

Stadion an der Bremer Brücke, Osnabrück
Attendance: 22,000
Referee: Carlos Silva Valente (Portugal)
