= UEFA Women's Euro 1991 final =

- Event: UEFA Women's Euro 1991
Germany	Norway
(Germany)	(Norway)
3	1
- Date: 14 July 1991
- Venue: Aalborg Stadion, Aalborg, Denmark
- Referee: James McCluskey (Scotland)

The UEFA Women's Euro 1991 final was an association football match on 14 July 1991 at Aalborg Stadion, Aalborg, to determine the winner of UEFA Women's Euro 1991.

== Background ==
=== Germany ===
Germany defeated Italy in the semi-finals 3–0.

=== Norway ===
Norway faced Denmark in the semi-finals it ended 0-0 and ended with a penalty shootout win for Norway.

== Final ==
14 July 1991

Germany	3–1 (a.e.t.)	Norway
Mohr 62', 100'; Neid 110'	DFB Report (in German); NFF Report (in Norwegian); Report	Hegstad 54'

Aalborg Stadion, Aalborg
Attendance: 6,000
Referee: James McCluskey (Scotland)
