= Tina Theune =

German football manager

Personal information
- Full name: Christina Theune
- Date of birth: 4 November 1953 (age 73)
- Place of birth: Kleve, West Germany
- Height: 1.69 m (5 ft 7 in)
- Position: Midfielder

Senior career*
Years	Team	Apps	(Gls)
1974–1986	Grün-Weiß Brauweiler		

Managerial career
- 1996–2005: Germany
- * Club domestic league appearances and goals

Christina Theune (formerly Theune-Meyer; born 4 November 1953) is a German former football manager, and the former national coach of the German women's national team.

== Biography ==
Theune was born into a sporting family. Her father was a track and field athlete, and her mother played handball.

== Career ==
She played from 1974 until 1986 for Grün-Weiß Brauweiler, where she was also later player-manager.

After she completed her teacher training, she became the first woman in Germany to acquire the DFB Fußball-Lehrer (coach) licence in 1985, which is equivalent to the UEFA Pro license.

In 1986 she became assistant coach to the women's national team, and succeeded Gero Bisanz as national coach on 1 August 1996 after the Summer Olympics in Atlanta. In total she won six European championships, three as an assistant to Gero Bisanz, three as national coach, and led the German women's team to victory in the 2003 Women's World Cup. After winning the UEFA Women's Championship in 2005, she retired from the position of national coach, as had already been announced, handing over to her assistant Silvia Neid.

== Personal life ==
Theune married Thomas Meyer, who coached her as a player. After marriage, she adopted the surname "Theune-Meyer" until her divorce in 2008.

== Honours ==
=== Manager ===
Germany

- Summer Olympic Games: bronze medal 2000, bronze medal 2004
- FIFA Women's World Cup: 2003
- UEFA Women's Championship: 1997, 2001, 2005

Orders

- Bundesverdienstkreuz am Bande: 2002
