= 1987 European Competition for Women's Football final =

- Event: 1987 European Competition for Women's Football
Norway	Sweden
(Norway)	(Sweden)
2	1
- Date: 14 June 1987
- Venue: Ullevaal Stadion, Oslo, Norway
- Referee: Eero Aho (Finland)

The 1987 European Competition for Women's Football final was an association football match on 14 June 1987 at the Ullevaal Stadion in Oslo to determine the winner of 1987 European Competition for Women's Football.

== Final ==
14 June 1987

Norway	2–1	Sweden
Stendal 28', 72'	NFF Report (in Norwegian); SvFF Report (in Swedish); Report	Videkull 73'

Ullevaal Stadion, Oslo
Attendance: 8,408
Referee: Eero Aho (Finland)
