= UEFA Women's Euro 1995 final =

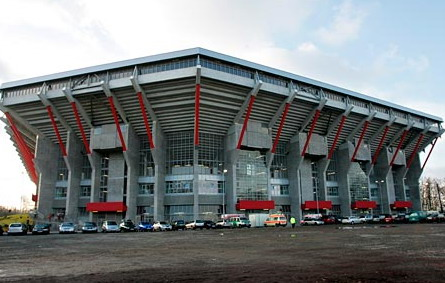
- The outside of Fritz-Walter-Stadion, Kaiserslautern, Germany, where the final was held (pictured here in 2006)
- Event: UEFA Women's Euro 1995
Germany	Sweden
(Germany)	(Sweden)
3	2
- Date: 26 March 1995
- Venue: Fritz-Walter-Stadion, Kaiserslautern
- Referee: Ilkka Koho (Finland)
- Attendance: 8,500

The final of UEFA Women's Euro 1995 was held on 26 March 1995 at Fritz-Walter-Stadion in Kaiserslautern, Germany. Germany won, beating Sweden 3-2.

== Background ==
=== Germany ===
Germany defeated England over 2-legged tie to reach the final.

=== Sweden ===
Sweden defeated Norway over 2-legged tie to reach the final.

== Match ==
=== Summary ===
Germany won a closely contested match against Sweden 3-2.

== Final ==
26 March 1995

Germany	3–2	Sweden
Meinert 33'; Prinz 64'; Wiegmann 85'	DFB Report (in German); SvFF Report (in Swedish); Report	Andersson 6'; Andelén 89'

Fritz-Walter-Stadion, Kaiserslautern
Attendance: 8,500
Referee: Ilkka Koho (Finland)
