= UEFA Women's Euro 2009 final =

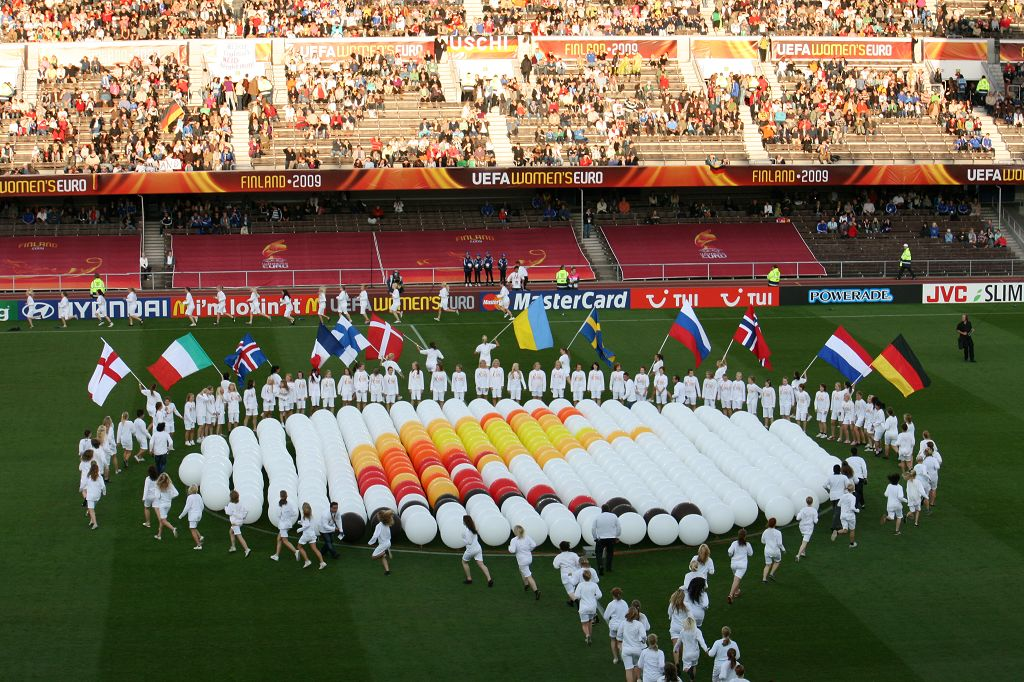
- Just before the start of the final in Helsinki Olympic Stadium, Finland
- Event: UEFA Women's Euro 2009
England	Germany
(England)	(Germany)
2	6
- Date: 10 September 2009
- Venue: Olympic Stadium, Helsinki, Finland
- Referee: Dagmar Damková (Czech Republic)
- Attendance: 15,877

The final of UEFA Women's Euro 2009 was held on 10 September 2009 at the Olympic Stadium in Helsinki, Finland. The match was won by the defending champions Germany, who earned their fifth consecutive European title – and seventh in total – with a 6–2 win over England.

== Background ==
=== England ===
England leading up to the tournament had only lost just once in their 11 matches and were quietly optimistic about reaching the final.

They were placed in Group C, along with Sweden, Italy and Russia. Initially England had a rocky start losing to Italy 2–1. Results slowly improved starting with a win against Russia. The following match was a tie with Sweden which was enough to put England into the quarter-finals.

In the quarter-finals a Eniola Aluko brace was enough to defeat the hosts Finland. In the semi-finals England defeated the Netherlands in extra time thanks to a Jill Scott header.

=== Germany ===
Germany were placed in Group B with Norway, France and Iceland. Germany started in the group in dominant fashion with a 4–0 victory over Norway. The second group game was followed by a 5–1 victory over France. Germany won its final match 1–0 against Iceland.

Germany defeated Italy in the quarter-finals in a close fought match 2–1. In the semi-finals Germany comfortably beat Norway 3–1. Germany reached the final as overwhelming favourites.

== Match ==
=== Summary ===
Germany dominated England and took a 2–0 after 21 minutes when Birgit Prinz and then Melanie Behringer scored.

England regrouped and Karen Carney halved the deficit after just two minutes from Behringer's goal.

Germany extended their lead after six minutes in the second half when a shot by Simone Laudehr was saved from the post with the ball ending up on the feet of Kim Kulig, who scored in an empty net.

England fought valiantly and attacked again four minutes later, when Carney received a pass from Kelly Smith, who turned around and scored leaving the game at 2–3.

England pushed forward in search of a goal but conceded further goals in the last half hour of from Inka Grings and Prinz making the score 6–2.

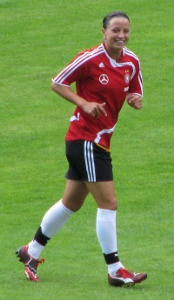
Inka Grings, winner of the Golden boot for the second consecutive edition

== Match details ==
10 September 2009
19:00

England	2–6	Germany
Carney 24'; K. Smith 55'	Report	Prinz 20', 76'; Behringer 22'; Kulig 50'; Grings 62', 73'

Olympic Stadium, Helsinki
Attendance: 15,877
Referee: Dagmar Damková (Czech Republic)

England	Germany

GK	1	Rachel Brown
RB	2	Alex Scott
CB	6	Anita Asante
CB	14	Faye White (c)
LB	3	Casey Stoney	(yellow card) 44'
CM	8	Katie Chapman		(substituted off) 86'
CM	4	Fara Williams
CM	12	Jill Scott
AM	7	Karen Carney
CF	9	Eniola Aluko		(substituted off) 81'
CF	10	Kelly Smith
Substitutions:
FW	17	Lianne Sanderson		(substituted on) 81'
MF	18	Emily Westwood		(substituted on) 86'
Manager:
Hope Powell

GK	1	Nadine Angerer
RB	4	Babett Peter
CB	3	Saskia Bartusiak
CB	5	Annike Krahn
LB	10	Linda Bresonik
CM	6	Simone Laudehr
CM	7	Melanie Behringer	(substituted off) 60'
CM	14	Kim Kulig
RF	8	Inka Grings
CF	9	Birgit Prinz (c)
LF	18	Kerstin Garefrekes	(substituted off) 83'
Substitutions:
FW	13	Célia Okoyino da Mbabi	(substituted on) 60'
MF	19	Fatmire Bajramaj	(substituted on) 83'
Manager:
Silvia Neid

Assistant referees:
Romina Santuari (Italy)
Lada Rojc (Croatia)
Fourth official:
Kirsi Heikkinen (Finland)

Match rules

- 90 minutes
- 30 minutes of extra time if scores level
- Penalty shoot-out if scores still level
- Maximum of three substitutes allowed

== Aftermath ==
Germany's victory marked the fifth title in a row as well as 19 games against England without defeat. Faye White stated "We can hold our heads high".

England manager Hope Powell stated she was not disappointed after losing the final. Jill Scott was a member of the squad that lost in the 2009 final; she would win the title in 2022 by defeating Germany in the final. In 2022 Kelly Smith describes the disappointing performance as one her great regrets in her career.
