= 2008–09 Arsenal L.F.C. season =

English women's football club season

Arsenal Ladies
2008–09 season
- Chairman: Peter Hill-Wood
- Manager: Vic Akers
- Stadium: Meadow Park
- Premier League: Champions
- FA Cup: Winners
- Premier League Cup: Winners
- UEFA Cup: Quarter-finals
- Community Shield: Winners
- London County Cup: Winners
- Top goalscorer: League: Kelly Smith (25); All: Kelly Smith (32)
- Biggest win: 11–2 (vs Liverpool (A), Premier League, 24 August 2008)
- Biggest defeat: 0–6 (vs Umeå (A), UEFA Cup, 12 November 2008)
Home colours	Away colours	Third colours

The 2008–09 season was Arsenal Ladies Football Club's 22nd season since forming in 1987. The club participated in the National Division of the FA Women's Premier League, winning the title for a 6th consecutive season, this time on goal difference, defeating second-placed Everton on the final day at Widnes. However, they saw their five-year, 108-match unbeaten league run come to an end, after losing 3–0 at home to Everton. They completed a domestic treble by winning Premier League Cup and FA Women's Cup, defeating Doncaster Rovers Belles and Sunderland in the Finals respectively. They also competed in the UEFA Women's Cup, but lost at the quarter-final stage to Umeå, the side they had defeated in the Final two seasons ago.

This was Arsenal's final season under the management of Vic Akers, who stood down at the end of the season to take up the position of general manager at the club. He ended his time the club having won 32 major honours, including the UEFA Cup, making him the most successful Arsenal Manager of all time.

== Squad information & statistics ==
=== First team squad ===
Squad statistics correct as of May 2009

Squad No.	Name	Date of Birth (Age)	Since	Signed From
Goalkeepers
1	(Republic of Ireland) Emma Byrne	14 June 1979 (aged 30)	2000	(Denmark) Fortuna Hjørring
13	(Jamaica) Becky Spencer	22 February 1991 (aged 18)	2005	(England) Arsenal Academy
24	(England) Sarah Quantrill	21 July 1990 (aged 18)	2007	(England) Arsenal Academy
Defenders
2	(England) Alex Scott	14 October 1984 (aged 24)	2005	(England) Birmingham City
3	(Republic of Ireland) Yvonne Tracy	27 February 1981 (aged 28)	2000	(Republic of Ireland) St Patrick's Athletic
6	(England) Faye White (c)	2 February 1978 (aged 31)	1996	(England) Three Bridges
5	(England) Gilly Flaherty	24 August 1991 (aged 17)	2006	(England) Arsenal Academy
15	(England) Laura Bassett	2 August 1983 (aged 25)	2008	(England) Birmingham City
19	(Republic of Ireland) Niamh Fahey	13 October 1987 (aged 21)	2008	(Republic of Ireland) Salthill Devon
21	(Saint Lucia) Eartha Pond	4 September 1983 (aged 25)	2008	(England) Leeds United
27	(Republic of Ireland) Seana Cooke	6 July 1989 (aged 19)	2006	(England) Arsenal Academy
	(England) Sahara Osborne–Ricketts	20 March 1991 (aged 18)	2008	(England) Arsenal Academy
	(England) Cally Rowell	14 January 1991 (aged 18)	2007	(England) Arsenal Academy
	(England) Rachel Pitman	6 December 1991 (aged 17)	2008	(England) Arsenal Academy
	(England) Carly Bray		2008	(England) Arsenal Academy
	(England) Lauren Williams		2008	(England) Arsenal Academy
	(England) Christie Turner		2008	(England) Arsenal Academy
Midfielders
4	(Wales) Jayne Ludlow	7 January 1979 (aged 30)	2000	(England) Southampton Saints
7	(Republic of Ireland) Ciara Grant	17 May 1978 (aged 31)	1998	(Republic of Ireland) St Patrick's Athletic
8	(England) Kelly Smith	29 October 1978 (aged 30)	2005	(United States) New Jersey Wildcats
16	(Scotland) Kim Little	26 September 1990 (aged 18)	2008	(Scotland) Hibernian
17	(England) Katie Chapman	15 June 1982 (aged 27)	2006	(England) Charlton Athletic
18	(Scotland) Natalie Ross	14 September 1989 (aged 19)	2008	(Scotland) Hibernian
22	(England) Laura Coombs	29 January 1991 (aged 18)	2007	(England) Arsenal Academy
23	(England) Abbie Prosser	4 September 1991 (aged 17)	2008	(England) Arsenal Academy
	(England) Lauren Walker	12 March 1989 (aged 20)	2006	(England) Wolverhampton Wanderers
Forwards
9	(Scotland) Suzanne Grant	17 April 1984 (aged 25)	2009	(Scotland) Hibernian
10	(Scotland) Julie Fleeting	18 December 1980 (aged 28)	2004	(Scotland) Ross County
11	(England) Rachel Yankey	1 November 1979 (aged 29)	2005	(United States) New Jersey Wildcats
12	(England) Gemma Davison	17 April 1987 (aged 22)	2001	(England) Watford
14	(England) Karen Carney	1 August 1987 (aged 21)	2006	(England) Birmingham City
20	(England) Danielle Bird	22 February 1987 (aged 22)	2008	(England) Birmingham City
20	(Wales) Helen Lander	26 April 1986 (aged 23)	2009	(England) Watford
25	(England) Lauren Bruton	22 November 1992 (aged 16)	2008	(England) Arsenal Academy
	(Republic of Ireland) Lillie Bilson	19 July 1991 (aged 17)	2008	(England) Arsenal Academy
	(Republic of Ireland) Jadine Madden		2008	(England) Arsenal Academy

=== Appearances and goals ===
No.	Name	PLND		FA Cup		PL Cup		LC Cup		Comm Shield		UEFA Cup		Total	
No.	Name	Apps	Goals	Apps	Goals	Apps	Goals	Apps	Goals	Apps	Goals	Apps	Goals	Apps	Goals
Goalkeepers
1	(Republic of Ireland) Emma Byrne	19	0	5	0	4	0	3	0	1	0	5	0	37+3	0
13	(Jamaica) Rebecca Spencer	3+1	0	1	0	0	0	0	0	0	0	0	0	4+1	0
24	(England) Sarah Quantrill	0	0	0	0	0	0	0	0	0	0	0	0	0	0
Defenders
2	(England) Alex Scott	12+1	1	1	0	4+1	1	0	0	1	0	5	0	23+2	2
3	(Republic of Ireland) Yvonne Tracy	8	1	0	0	0	0	0	0	1	0	4	1	13	2
6	(England) Faye White (c)	5	1	2+1	0	2	0	1	0	0	0	3+1	0	13+2	1
5	(England) Gilly Flaherty	16	0	3+1	1	1+1	1	3	2	1	0	0+1	0	24+3	4
15	(England) Laura Bassett	19+1	0	4+1	1	4+1	0	2	0	1	0	0	0	30+3	1
19	(Republic of Ireland) Niamh Fahey	15+3	2	5	0	4	0	2	0	0	0	5	0	31+3	2
21	(Saint Lucia) Eartha Pond	2+5	0	0+1	0	1	0	1+1	0	0	0	0	0	4+7	0
27	(Republic of Ireland) Seana Cooke	0	0	0	0	0	0	0	0	0	0	0	0	0	0
	(England) Sahara Osborne–Ricketts	0	0	0	0	0	0	1	0	0	0	0	0	1	0
	(England) Cally Rowell	0	0	0	0	0	0	1	0	0	0	0	0	1	0
	(England) Rachel Pitman	0	0	0	0	0	0	1	0	0	0	0	0	1	0
	(England) Carly Bray	0	0	0	0	0	0	1	0	0	0	0	0	1	0
	(England) Lauren Williams	0	0	0	0	0	0	1	0	0	0	0	0	1	0
	(England) Christie Turner	0	0	0	0	0	0	0+1	0	0	0	0	0	0+1	0
Midfielders
4	(Wales) Jayne Ludlow	20+1	7	5	2	4+1	1	1+1	0	1	0	4+1	3	35+4	13
7	(Republic of Ireland) Ciara Grant	17	1	5	0	3	1	3	0	1	0	3+1	0	32+1	2
8	(England) Kelly Smith	12	25	1	0	4	4	0	0	1	1	4	1	22	31
16	(Scotland) Kim Little	20+1	10	5	5	4+1	4	2	1	0+1	0	5	5	36+3	25
17	(England) Katie Chapman	16+4	6	5	3	5	0	1	0	0	0	5	0	32+5	9
18	(Scotland) Natalie Ross	2+3	0	0+2	0	1	0	1	1	0	0	0+1	0	4+6	1
22	(England) Laura Coombs	0	0	0	0	0+1	0	0+1	0	0	0	0	0	0+2	0
23	(England) Abbie Prosser	0+2	0	0	0	0	0	1	1	0	0	0	0	1+2	1
	(England) Lauren Walker	0	0	0	0	0	0	0	0	0	0	0	0	0	0
Forwards
9	(Scotland) Suzanne Grant	3+5	3	1+1	0	0+1	1	2	4	0	0	0	0	6+7	8
10	(Scotland) Julie Fleeting	5+2	7	0	0	3	5	0	0	0	0	2+2	2	10+4	14
11	(England) Rachel Yankey	10+7	4	5	1	3+1	4	0	0	1	0	0+4	0	19+12	9
12	(England) Gemma Davison	19+3	7	5	1	4+1	0	3	1	1	0	5	2	37+4	11
14	(England) Karen Carney	13	8	0+1	1	2	1	0	0	1	0	5	2	21+1	12
20	(England) Danielle Bird	0+4	3	0	0	0	0	0	0	0	0	0+1	0	0+5	3
20	(Wales) Helen Lander	6+4	1	3+1	3	0	0	2	3	0	0	0	0	11+5	7
25	(England) Lauren Bruton	0+1	0	0	0	0+1	0	0	0	0	0	0	0	0+2	0
	(Republic of Ireland) Lillie Bilson	0	0	0	0	0	0	0+1	0	0	0	0	0	0+1	0
	(Republic of Ireland) Jadine Madden	0	0	0	0	0	0	1	0	0	0	0	0	0	0

=== Goalscorers ===
Rank	No.	Position	Name	PLND	FA Cup	PL Cup	LC Cup	Comm Shield	UEFA Cup	Total
1	8	MF	(England) Kelly Smith	25	0	4	0	1	1	31
2	16	MF	(Scotland) Kim Little	10	5	4	1	0	5	25
3	10	FW	(Scotland) Julie Fleeting	7	0	5	0	0	2	14
4	4	MF	(Wales) Jayne Ludlow	7	2	1	0	0	3	13
5	14	FW	(England) Karen Carney	8	1	1	0	0	2	12
6	12	FW	(England) Gemma Davison	7	1	0	1	0	2	11
7	17	MF	(England) Katie Chapman	6	3	0	0	0	0	9
7	11	FW	(England) Rachel Yankey	4	1	4	0	0	0	9
9	9	FW	(Scotland) Suzanne Grant	3	0	1	4	0	0	8
10	20	FW	(Wales) Helen Lander	1	3	0	3	0	0	7
11	5	DF	(England) Gilly Flaherty	0	1	1	2	0	0	4
12	20	FW	(England) Danielle Bird	3	0	0	0	0	0	3
13	2	DF	(England) Alex Scott	1	0	1	0	0	0	2
13	3	DF	(Republic of Ireland) Yvonne Tracy	1	0	0	0	0	1	2
13	19	DF	(Republic of Ireland) Niamh Fahey	2	0	0	0	0	0	2
13	7	MF	(Republic of Ireland) Ciara Grant	1	0	1	0	0	0	2
17	6	DF	(England) Faye White	1	0	0	0	0	0	1
17	18	MF	(Scotland) Natalie Ross	0	0	0	1	0	0	1
17	23	MF	(England) Abbie Prosser	0	0	0	1	0	0	1
17	15	DF	(England) Laura Bassett	0	1	0	0	0	0	1
Total				87	18	23	13	1	16	158

=== Clean sheets ===
Rank	No.	Name	PLND	FA Cup	PL Cup	LC Cup	Comm Shield	UEFA Cup	Total
1	1	(Republic of Ireland) Emma Byrne	11	2	3	2	1	1	20
2	13	(Jamaica) Becky Spencer	1	0	0	0	0	0	1
Total			12	2	3	2	1	1	21

== Transfers, loans and other signings ==
=== Transfers in ===
Announcement date	No.	Position	Player	From club
6 August 2008	15	DF	(England) Laura Bassett	(England) Birmingham City
6 August 2008	20	FW	(England) Danielle Bird	(England) Birmingham City
28 July 2008	19	DF	(Republic of Ireland) Niamh Fahey	(Republic of Ireland) Salthill Devon
28 July 2008	18	MF	(Scotland) Natalie Ross	(Scotland) Hibernian
1 August 2008	21	DF	(Saint Lucia) Eartha Pond	(England) Leeds United
3 January 2009	20	FW	(Wales) Helen Lander	(England) Watford
20 February 2009	9	FW	(Scotland) Suzanne Grant	(Scotland) Hibernian

=== Transfers out ===
Announcement date	No.	Position	Player	To club
3 July 2008	18	DF	(England) Anita Asante	(England) Chelsea
3 July 2008	9	FW	(England) Lianne Sanderson	(England) Chelsea
4 July 2008	23	DF	(England) Mary Phillip	(England) Chelsea
July 2008		FW	(Wales) Sarah Wiltshire	(England) Watford
2008	19	DF	(Netherlands) Felicienne Minnaar	(Netherlands) FC Twente
October 2008	20	FW	(England) Danielle Bird	(England) Birmingham City
6 February 2009	2	DF	(England) Alex Scott	(United States) Boston Breakers
18 February 2009	8	MF	(England) Kelly Smith	(United States) Boston Breakers
28 January 2009	14	FW	(England) Karen Carney	(United States) Chicago Red Stars

== Club ==
=== Kit ===
Supplier: Nike / Sponsor: Fly Emirates

Home	Away	Third

== Competitions ==
=== Overall record ===
Competition	First match	Last match	Starting round	Final position	Record							
Competition	First match	Last match	Starting round	Final position	Pld	W	D	L	GF	GA	GD	Win %
FA Women's Premier League National Division	17 August 2008	10 May 2009	Matchday 1	Winners	18	16	1	1	89	14	+75	88.89
FA Women's Cup	11 January 2009	4 May 2009	Fourth round	Winners	5	5	0	0	19	3	+16	100.00
FA Women's Premier League Cup	14 September 2008	25 February 2009	First round	Winners	5	5	0	0	25	3	+22	100.00
UEFA Women's Cup	9 October 2008	12 November 2008	Second qualifying round	Quarter-finals	5	3	0	2	16	13	+3	60.00
FA Women's Community Shield	7 August 2008		Final	Winners	1	1	0	0	1	0	+1	100.00
London County Cup	4 March 2009	28 April 2009	Quarter-finals	Winners	3	3	0	0	13	2	+11	100.00
Total					37	33	1	3	163	35	+128	89.19

Last updated: 24 May 2026
Source: FA WPL

=== FA Women's Community Shield ===
7 August 2008 Final	Arsenal	1–0	Everton	Macclesfield
19:45 (BST)	Smith 72'	Report		Stadium: Moss Rose; Attendance: 1,494; Referee: Saša Ihringová

=== FA Women's Premier League National Division ===
==== Partial league table ====
Pos	Team	Pld	W	D	L	GF	GA	GD	Pts	Qualification or relegation
1	Arsenal (C)	22	20	1	1	89	14	+75	61	Qualification for the Champions League knockout phase
2	Everton	22	20	1	1	68	10	+58	61	Qualification for the Champions League qualifying round
3	Chelsea	22	16	2	4	55	23	+32	50	
4	Doncaster Rovers Belles	22	9	6	7	43	36	+7	33	
5	Birmingham City	22	10	3	9	39	43	−4	33	

Source: FA WPL
(C) Champions

==== Results summary ====
Overall								Home						Away					
Pld	W	D	L	GF	GA	GD	Pts	W	D	L	GF	GA	GD	W	D	L	GF	GA	GD
22	20	1	1	89	14	+75	61	10	0	1	42	6	+36	10	1	0	47	8	+39

==== Results by matchday ====
Matchday	1	2	3	4	5	6	7	8	9	10	11	12	13	14	15	16	17	18	19	20	21	22
Ground	H	A	H	A	H	A	H	H	H	H	A	H	H	A	A	A	H	A	H	A	A	A
Result	W	W	W	W	W	W	W	W	W	W	W	W	W	W	W	W	L	W	W	D	W	W
Position	1	1	1	1	1	1	1	1	1	1	1	1	1	1	1	1	1	1	1	1	1	1

Source: FA WPL
W = Win; D = Draw; L = Loss

==== Matches ====
17 August 2008 1	Arsenal	4–0	Blackburn Rovers	Borehamwood
13:00 BST	Smith 7', 17', 56'; Ludlow 44'	Report		Stadium: Meadow Park; Attendance: 276

24 August 2008 2	Liverpool	2–11	Arsenal	Skelmersdale
14:00 BST	Foster 45', 37'	Report	Smith 12', 14', 16', 32', 87'; Carney 25', 80'; Ludlow 42', 49'; Bird 75', 82'	Stadium: Skelmersdale Ormskirk Stadium

28 August 2008 3	Arsenal	6–1	Watford	Borehamwood
19:45 BST	Little 13', 45'; Daniels 31' (o.g.); Ludlow 47'; Smith 77', 79'	Report	Lander 83'	Stadium: Meadow Park; Attendance: 334

31 August 2008 4	Leeds Carnegie	1–6	Arsenal	Tadcaster
14:00 BST	Moore 7'; Culvin (red card) 22'	Report	Smith 2', 5' (red card) 22'; Carney 18', 57' (pen.); Davison 40'; Chapman 75'	Stadium: Ings Lane

7 September 2008 5	Arsenal	6–1	Doncaster Rovers Belles	Borehamwood
14:00 BST	Little 2'; Carney 17', 21'; Smith 43', 81'; Ludlow 79'	Report	Hansen 74'	Stadium: Meadow Park

18 September 2008 6	Nottingham Forest	1–5	Arsenal	Gedling
19:45 BST	Bell 40'	Report	Smith 10', 46'; Davison 30'; Chapman 68'; Bird 80'	Stadium: Bill Stokeld Stadium; Attendance: 677

21 September 2008 7	Arsenal	6–2	Birmingham City	Borehamwood
14:00 BST	Ludlow 15'; Davison 48', 90+5'; Fleeting 61', 90+1'; Little 90+3'	Report	Hall 46'; McCann 59'	Stadium: Meadow Park

19 October 2008 8	Arsenal	4–0	Leeds Carnegie	Borehamwood
14:00 BST	Chapman 5'; Fahey 19'; Fleeting 65'; Tracy 88'	Report		Stadium: Meadow Park

16 November 2008 9	Arsenal	5–0	Nottingham Forest	Borehamwood
14:00 GMT	Yankey 8'; Smith 33', 41'; Chapman 57'; Fleeting 87'	Report		Stadium: Meadow Park

23 November 2008 10	Arsenal	2–0	Liverpool	Borehamwood
14:00 GMT	Smith 52'; Yankey 68'	Report		Stadium: Meadow Park

30 November 2008 11	Bristol Academy	1–4	Arsenal	Almondsbury
14:00 GMT	McCatty 30'	Report	F. White 56'; Fleeting 42', 69', 77'	Stadium: Oaklands Park

18 December 2008 12	Arsenal	7–0	Fulham	Borehamwood
19:45 GMT	Chapman 9'; Little 34', 75'; Smith 57', 60', 89'; Davison 65'	Report		Stadium: Meadow Park

18 January 2009 13	Arsenal	4–1	Chelsea	Borehamwood
14:00 GMT	Smith 27'; Carney 30'; Chamberlain 52' (o.g.); A. Scott 84'	Report	Susi 61'	Stadium: Meadow Park

15 February 2009 14	Blackburn Rovers	0–4	Arsenal	Clitheroe
13:00 GMT		Report	Fahey 30'; Smith 38', 68'; Carney 56'	Stadium: Shawbride

19 March 2009 15	Fulham	0–5	Arsenal	Burnham
19:45 GMT		Report	Lander 10'; Ludlow 47'; Yankey 67'; S. Grant 75' (pen.); Davison 80'	Stadium: The Gore

26 March 2009 16	Watford	0–1	Arsenal	Northwood
19:30 GMT		Report	Yankey 27'	Stadium: The Skyline Stadium

29 March 2009 17	Arsenal	0–3	Everton	Borehamwood
14:00 GMT		Report	Williams 10'; Hinnigan 13'; J. Scott 53'	Stadium: Meadow Park

2 April 2009 18	Birmingham City	1–3	Arsenal	Redditch
19:45 BST	Hall 48'	Report	Little 18', 29'; C. Grant 73'	Stadium: Valley Stadium

5 April 2009 19	Arsenal	3–0	Bristol Academy	Borehamwood
14:00 BST	Little 10' (pen.); Chapman 45'; S. Grant 85' (pen.)	Report		Stadium: Meadow Park

12 April 2009 20	Doncaster Rovers Belles	0–0	Arsenal	Doncaster
14:00 BST		Report		Stadium: Keepmoat Stadium

30 April 2009 21	Chelsea	0–2	Arsenal	East Molesey
19:30 BST		Report	Davison 70'; Little 80'	Stadium: Imber Court; Referee: I. Crouch

10 May 2009 22	Everton	0–1	Arsenal	Widnes
14:00 BST		Report	S. Grant 13'	Stadium: Halton Stadium; Attendance: 2,135

=== FA Women's Cup ===
11 January 2009 Fourth round	Arsenal	7–0	Colchester United	Borehamwood
14:00 GMT	Chapman 38', 42'; Little 49', 55', 78'; Lander 63'; Bassett 83'	Report		Stadium: Meadow Park

25 January 2009 Fifth round	Middlesbrough	0–4	Arsenal	Stokesley
12:00 GMT		Report	Lander 54', 66'; Little 57'; Carney 84'	Stadium: Bishopton Road West

22 February 2009 Quarter-finals	Arsenal	3–1	Leeds Carnegie	Borehamwood
14:00 GMT	Telford 15' (o.g.); Ludlow 21'; Davison 77'	Report	Moore 26'	Stadium: Meadow Park

22 March 2009 Semi-finals	Arsenal	3–1	Everton	Bishop's Stortford
14:00 GMT	Yankey 21'; Ludlow 31' (yellow card); Flaherty 45+2' (yellow card); Chapman (yellow card)	Report	Dowie 54'	Stadium: Woodside Park; Attendance: 902; Referee: Stephen Daly

4 May 2009 Final	Arsenal	2–1	Sunderland	Derby
14:00 BST	Chapman 32'; Little 90+2'	Report	McDougall 90+7'; Greenwell (yellow card) 88'	Stadium: Pride Park Stadium; Attendance: 23,291; Referee: Saša Ihringová

=== FA Women's Premier League Cup ===
14 September 2008 First round	Arsenal	6–2	Charlton Athletic	Borehamwood
14:00 BST	Yankey 1', 82', 84'; Flaherty 13'; Little 32'; Smith 39'	Report	Dixson 70'; Webb	Stadium: Meadow Park; Referee: C Henry

5 October 2008 Second round	Arsenal	3–1	Everton	Borehamwood
14:00 BST	Carney 38' (pen.); Little 43', 48'	Report	Williams 78'	Stadium: Meadow Park

2 November 2008 Quarter-finals	Leicester City	0–7	Arsenal	Leicester
14:00 GMT		Report	Yankey 15'; Smith 37' (pen.); Fleeting 40', 62', 74'; Impey 50' (o.g.); C. Grant 83'	Stadium: Leicestershire Scouts HQ

7 December 2008 Semi-finals	Chelsea	0–4	Arsenal	East Molesey
14:00 GMT		Report	Perry 19' (o.g.); Fleeting 56', 88'; Ludlow 79'	Stadium: Imber Court

25 February 2009 Final	Doncaster Rovers Belles	0–5	Arsenal	Scunthorpe
14:00 GMT		Report	Smith 6', 33', 58'; A. Scott 66'; S. Grant 89'; Ludlow (yellow card) 90+2'	Stadium: Glanford Park; Attendance: 2,753; Referee: Steve Rowntree

=== London County Cup ===
04 March 2009 Quarter-finals	Arsenal	3–0	West Ham United	Colney Heath
19:45 GMT	Prosser 44'; Davison 62'; Flaherty 87' (pen.)	Report		Stadium: Recreation Ground

15 March 2009 Semi-finals	Arsenal	7–0	Crystal Palace	Potters Bar
14:00 GMT	Flaherty 30'; Lander 31', 52', 60'; S. Grant 51', 71'; Little 56'	Report		Stadium: The Lantern Stadium

28 April 2009 Final	Millwall Lionesses	2–3	Arsenal	Finchley
19:30 BST	Heatherson	Report	S. Grant 15', 90'; Ross 40'	Stadium: Harry Abrahams Stadium

=== UEFA Women's Cup ===
==== Second qualifying round ====
Pos	Team	Pld	W	D	L	GF	GA	GD	Pts	Qualification	LYO	ARS	NEU	ZUR
1	(France) Lyon (H)	3	3	0	0	18	1	+17	9	Advance to quarter-finals	—	3–0	8–0	–
2	(England) Arsenal	3	2	0	1	13	5	+8	6	Advance to quarter-finals	–	—	6–0	7–2
3	(Austria) Neulengbach	3	1	0	2	5	17	−12	3		–	–	—	5–3
4	(Switzerland) Zürich	3	0	0	3	6	19	−13	0		1–7	–	–	—

Source: RSSSF
(H) Hosts

9 October 2008 1	Arsenal (England)	7–2	(Switzerland) Zürich	Limonest
18:00 BST	Davison 9'; Chapman (yellow card) 20'; Smith 37'; Little 39', 57', 90+1' (pen.); Ludlow 52', 56'	Report	Lendenmann 19'; Fahey 66' (o.g.); Kehl (yellow card) 75'	Stadium: Stade Honneur; Referee: Natalia Avdonchenko (Russia)

11 October 2008 2	Arsenal (England)	6–0	(Austria) Neulengbach	Limonest
17:00 BST	Fleeting 21'; Little 33'; Carney 55', 74'; Fahey (yellow card) 60'; Tracy 85'; Davison 88'	Report	Brancao-Ribeiro (yellow card) 40'; Gumpenberger (yellow card) 67'; Mônica (yellow card) 68'	Stadium: Stade Honneur; Referee: Kirsi Heikkinen (Finland)

14 October 2008 3	Lyon (France)	3–0	(England) Arsenal	Lyon
18:00 BST	Schelin 27', 80'; Abily 76'	Report	Fleeting (yellow card) 19'; C. Grant (yellow card) 83'; A. Scott (yellow card) 86'	Stadium: Stade de Gerland; Referee: Natalia Avdonchenko (Russia)

==== Knockout phase ====
===== Quarter-finals =====
6 November 2008 First leg	Arsenal (England)	3–2	(Sweden) Umeå	Borehamwood
20:00 GMT	Ludlow 2' (yellow card) 90+1'; Fleeting 77'; Little 79'; Smith (yellow card) 84'	Report	Yamaguchi 13'; Östberg (yellow card) 53'; Bachmann (yellow card) 56'; Östberg 71'	Stadium: Meadow Park; Attendance: 454; Referee: Floarea Cristina Ionescu (Romania)

12 November 2008 Second leg	Umeå (Sweden)	6–0 (8–3 agg.)	(England) Arsenal	Umeå
18:00 GMT	Marta 1', 44', 46', 59' (yellow card) 80'; Ljungberg 48'; Rönnlund 73' (pen.)	Report	Yankey (yellow card) 62'; White (yellow card) 72'	Stadium: Gammliavallen; Attendance: 2,493; Referee: Christine Beck (Germany)

== See also ==
- List of Arsenal W.F.C. seasons
- 2008–09 in English football
