= 2009 FA Women's Premier League Cup final =

2009 football tournament season finals

- Event: 2009 FA Women's Premier League Cup
Doncaster Rovers Belles	Arsenal
0	5
- Date: 26 February 2009
- Venue: Glanford Park, Scunthorpe
- Player of the Match: Kelly Smith (Arsenal)
- Referee: Steve Rowntree
- Attendance: 2,753

The 2009 FA Women's Premier League Cup final was the 18th final of the FA Women's Premier League Cup, England's main women's league cup competition before it was replaced by the FA WSL Cup in 2011. Arsenal defeated Doncaster Rovers Belles 5–0 at Glanford Park, Scunthorpe.

== Match ==
=== Team news ===
Belles manager John Buckley, already without his injured Canadian top-goalscorer Liz Hansen, regretted the scheduling of the match which ruled key midfielder Precious Hamilton out with suspension. It also meant that Arsenal's Alex Scott and Kelly Smith were still available, having not yet joined Boston Breakers of Women's Professional Soccer.

Vic Akers – in his final season as Arsenal manager – could call on Scott and Smith for a final time, but Karen Carney had already taken up her transfer to Chicago Red Stars. He was also without Faye White and Yvonne Tracy (long-term knee injuries), Julie Fleeting (pregnant), and recent signing Helen Lander, who was cup-tied having played for Watford in an earlier round. New signing from Hibernian Suzanne Grant was named as a substitute. Emma Byrne remained in goal having rejected her own transfer offer from Boston Breakers.

Akers named a 4–2–1–3 formation with Gemma Davison coming in for Carney on the right wing to start her first Cup final for Arsenal. Rachel Yankey was on the other flank, with youngster Kim Little playing behind Smith in attack. Strong midfielders Jayne Ludlow and Katie Chapman played in front of a back four in which the experience of Laura Bassett was preferred to the youthful talents of Gilly Flaherty. John Buckley aimed for containment, naming a 4–1–4–1 setup with Amy Turner sweeping in front of the back four and Rachel Williams leading the line as a makeshift centre-forward.

=== Summary ===
26 February 2009
19:00 GMT (UTC+00:00)

Doncaster Rovers Belles	0–5	Arsenal
	The Guardian; Arsenal F.C. The FA	Smith 6', 33', 58'; Scott 66'; S. Grant 89'

Glanford Park, Scunthorpe
Attendance: 2,753
Referee: Steve Rowntree

Doncaster Rovers Belles	Arsenal

GK	1	(England) Nicola Hobbs
RB	2	(England) Chelsea Weston
CB	5	(England) Claire Utley
CB	12	(England) Natasha Hughes
LB	3	(England) Vanessa Leat
DM	6	(England) Amy Turner
RM	14	(England) Emma Johnson	(substituted off) 88'
CM	8	(England) Vicky Exley (c)
CM	10	(England) Vikki Stevens	(substituted off) 77'
LM	7	(England) Emily Heckler
CF	4	(England) Rachel Williams
Substitutes:
GK	13	(England) Clare Farrow
DF	15	(England) Natalie Shaw	(substituted on) 77'
DF	16	(England) Naomi Chadwick	(substituted on) 88'
FW	17	(England) Sarah Owen
FW	9	(England) Suzanne Davies
Manager:
(Scotland) John Buckley

GK	1	(Republic of Ireland) Emma Byrne
RB	2	(England) Alex Scott
CB	7	(Republic of Ireland) Ciara Grant
CB	15	(England) Laura Bassett		(substituted off) 81'
LB	19	(Republic of Ireland) Niamh Fahey
CM	4	(Wales) Jayne Ludlow (c)	(yellow card) 90+2'
CM	17	(England) Katie Chapman
AM	16	(Scotland) Kim Little
RW	12	(England) Gemma Davison		(substituted off) 77'
CF	8	(England) Kelly Smith		(substituted off) 88'
LW	11	(England) Rachel Yankey
Substitutes:
GK	24	(England) Sarah Quantrill
DF	5	(England) Gilly Flaherty		(substituted on) 81'
MF	18	(Scotland) Natalie Ross
FW	26	(England) Lauren Bruton		(substituted on) 88'
FW	9	(Scotland) Suzanne Grant		(substituted on) 77'
Manager:
(England) Vic Akers

Player of the Match:

Kelly Smith (Arsenal)

Match rules
- 90 minutes
- 30 minutes of extra time if necessary
- Penalty shoot-out if scores still level
- Five named substitutes.
