= 2008 FA Women's Community Shield =

Annual football match

2008 Women's FA Community Shield
Arsenal	Everton
1	0
- Date: 7 August 2008
- Venue: Moss Rose, Macclesfield
- Referee: Saša Ihringová

The 2008 Women's FA Community Shield was the eighth Women's FA Community Shield, as with its male equivalent, the Community Shield is an annual football match played between the winners of the previous season's league and the previous season's Women's FA Cup. The final was contested between Arsenal and Everton on 7 August 2008 at Moss Rose, then home ground of Macclesfield Town. Kelly Smith scored the winner for Arsenal.

== Match ==
=== Details ===
7 August 2008
19:45 (BST)

Arsenal	1–0	Everton
Smith 72'	Report

Moss Rose, Macclesfield
Attendance: 1,494
Referee: Saša Ihringová

Arsenal	Everton

GK	1	(Republic of Ireland) Emma Byrne
DF	2	(England) Alex Scott
DF	3	(Republic of Ireland) Yvonne Tracy
DF	5	(England) Gilly Flaherty
DF	15	(England) Laura Bassett
MF	7	(Republic of Ireland) Ciara Grant
MF	8	(England) Kelly Smith	(substituted off) 75'
MF	4	(Wales) Jayne Ludlow
FW	11	(England) Rachel Yankey
FW	12	(England) Gemma Davison
FW	14	(England) Karen Carney
Substitutes:
GK	13	(Jamaica) Rebecca Spencer
DF	6	(England) Faye White
MF	16	(Scotland) Kim Little	(substituted on) 75'
MF	18	(Scotland) Natalie Ross
FW	20	(England) Danielle Bird
Manager:
(England) Vic Akers

GK	1	(England) Rachel Brown
DF	2	(England) Becky Easton
DF	3	(England) Rachel Unitt
DF	6	(England) Lindsay Johnson
MF	4	(England) Fara Williams
MF	5	(England) Emily Westwood	(substituted off) 81'
MF	8	(England) Jill Scott
MF	10	(England) Jo Potter	(substituted off) 64'
FW	7	(England) Toni Duggan	(substituted off) 90'
FW	9	(England) Natasha Dowie
FW	11	(England) Michelle Evans
Substitutes:
GK	13	(England) Danielle Hill
MF	15	(England) Amy Kane
MF	14	(England) Michelle Hinnigan	(substituted on) 81'
MF	16	(England) Isobel Christiansen	(substituted on) 90'
FW	18	(England) Karen Boyle	(substituted on) 64'
Manager:
(England) Mo Marley
