= 2008–09 FA Women's Cup =

Tournament details
- Country: England; Wales
- Teams: 307

Final positions
- Champions: Arsenal
- Runners-up: Sunderland
- Penalty shoot-outs do not count towards the total number of goals.

The 2008–09 FA Women's Cup was an association football knockout tournament for women's teams, held between 7 September 2008 and 4 May 2009. It was the 39th season of the FA Women's Cup and was won by Arsenal, who defeated Sunderland in the final. The tournament consisted of a preliminary round, four qualifying rounds and eight rounds of competition proper.

The competition began on 7 September 2008 when the 118 lowest–ranked teams in the tournament took part in the preliminary round.

All match results and dates from the Women's FA Cup Website.

== Preliminary round ==
All games were played on 7, 14 and 21 September 2008

Tie	Home team (tier)	Score	Away team (tier)	Att.
1	Abbey Rangers	0–18	Shanklin	
2	Alphington	1–7	Frome Town	
3	Arlesey Town	8–2	Daventry Town	
4	Braintree Town	2–0	Tring Athletic	
5	Cambridge University	1–0	Histon Hornets	
6	Cheltenham Town	5–0	Newbury	
7	Chichester City	4–2	Merstham	
8	Crawley Wasps	1–3	Crowborough Athletic	
9	East Preston	1–3	Wandgas	
10	Eastleigh	0–5	Aldershot Town	
11	Fairfield Villa	0–3	Stoke City	
12	Ferndale	2–5	Leamington Lions	
13	Friar Lane & Epworth	9–0	Huncote Sports & Social	
14	Great Berry	5–7	Royston Town	
15	Guiseley AFC Vixens	3–2	Sheffield United Community	
16	Harlow Athletic	A–W	Sawbridgeworth Town	
W/O for Sawbridgeworth Town
17	Haverhill Rovers	0–5	West Lynn	
18	Heather St.Johns	1–0	Oadby & Wigston	
19	Hemel Hempstead Town	5–2	Billericay Town	
20	Hereford Phoenix	14–0	Tipton Town	
21	Hitchin Hearts	6–0	Runwell Hospital	
22	Hoddesdon Owls	0–2	Dagenham & Redbridge	
23	Horley Town	3–2	Bisley	
24	Hutton	1–2	Hawkwell Athletic	
25	Keighley AFC	4–1	Brighouse Town	
26	Kettering Town	11–0	Woodford United	
27	Lancaster City	1–10	Wigan Athletic	
28	Leighton Linslade	0–6	Bedford	
29	Leighton United Vixens	6–2	Cogenhoe & Kingsthorpe	
30	London Corinthians	4–0	Aylesford	

Tie	Home team (tier)	Score	Away team (tier)	Att.
31	Long Eaton United	0–4	Loughborough Foxes	
32	Maidenhead United	5–1	Chalfont St Peter	
33	Market Warsop	14–1	Marlborough Rovers	
34	MK Wanderers	3–1	Salisbury City	
35	Newcastle Medics	1–4	Prudhoe Town	
36	Oadby Town	1–6	Clifton	
37	Old Actonians	7–0	The Comets	
38	Panthers	5–3 (a.e.t.)	Denham United	
39	Peterborough Sports	2–2 (6–5 p)	Peterborough Azure	
40	Poole Town	0–5	Weymouth	
41	St Francis 2000	9–0	RACA Tynedale	
42	Ramsgate	0–4	Deal Town	
43	Raunds Town	3–1	Flitwick	
44	Reading Girls	4–0	Brize Norton	
45	Redcar Town	2–4	East Durham United	
46	Rottingdean Village	0–1	Eastbourne Town	
47	Saffron Walden Town	H–W	Stevenage Borough Vixens	
W/O for Saffron Walden Town
48	Sandy	5–0	Brackley Sports	
49	Seahaven Harriers	0–2	Haywards Heath Town	
50	Sheffield	1–3	Barnsley	
51	St Martins	4–3	AFC Kempston Rovers	
52	Stoke Lane Athletic	4–3	Swindon Supermarine	
53	Swanton United	0–5	Hethersett Athletic	
54	Tempest	2–2 (?–? p)	Runwell & Rayleigh Raiders	
55	West Bergholt	1–2	Barking	
56	West Bridgford	2–4	Bridgford	
57	Wigan	4–1	Morecambe	
58	Woodbridge Town	7–0	Thorpe United	
59	Worcester City	2–3	Pegasus	

== First round qualifying ==
All games were played on 28 September 2008.

Tie	Home team (tier)	Score	Away team (tier)	Att.
1	Accrington Girls & Ladies	0–5	Middleton Athletic	
2	AFC Wimbledon	5–0	Joybabe	
3	Andover New Street	3–1	Wandgas	
4	Aylesbury United	0–11	Maidenhead United	
5	Banbury United	4–0	Newent Town	
6	Barking	2–1	London Colney	
7	Barnsley	5–0	Keighley AFC	
8	Battersea & Wandsworth	0–2	Panthers	
9	Birmingham Athletic	9–0	Wednesfield	
10	Braintree Town	2–5	Brentwood Town	
11	Brandon United	4–1	North Shields	
12	Brentford	21–0	One Wish	
13	Bury Girls & Ladies	4–1	Whitehaven	
14	Buxton	4–0	Bridgford	
15	Cambridge United	1–2	West Lynn	
16	Chichester City	1–5	Aldershot Town	
17	Chinnor	H–W	Carterton	
W/O for Chinnor
18	Chippenham Town	1–0	Henley Town	
19	Clifton	5–0	Harborough Town 2007	
20	Corby Stewarts & Lloyds	4–2	Raunds Town	
21	Cullompton Rangers	1–2	Frome Town	
22	Dagenham & Redbridge	3–3 (4–3 p)	Hemel Hempstead Town	
23	Darlington Railway Athletic	5–3	Birtley Town	
24	Deal Town	4–3	Crowborough Athletic	
25	Ebbsfleet United	3–2	Eastbourne Town	
26	Forest Hall	2–1	Gateshead Cleveland Hall	
27	Garston	12–0	Runwell & Rayleigh Raiders	
28	Hampstead	3–4 (a.e.t.)	Tower Hamlets	
29	Hawkwell Athletic	2–6	Royston Town	
30	Haywards Heath Town	1–2	London Corinthians	
31	Heather St.Johns	2–4	Gedling Town	
32	Hinckley United	2–7	Friar Lane & Epworth	
33	Hitchin Hearts	2–4	West	
34	Huntingdon Town	5–0	March Town United	
35	Ilminster Town	5–2	Purbeck	
36	Kettering Town	0–1	Bedford	
37	Larkhall Athletic	4–0	Keynsham Town Development	
38	Launceston	2–2 (3–1 p)	Weymouth	
39	Leighton United Vixens	1–5	Arlesey Town	
40	Linby CW	0–10	Sandiacre Town	
41	Liverpool Feds	2–1	Chester City	
42	Lumley	2–2 (3–2 p)	East Durham United	

Tie	Home team (tier)	Score	Away team (tier)	Att.
43	Maidstone Town	2–1	Canterbury City	
44	Manford Way	H–W	London United	
W/O for Manford Way
45	Mansfield Town	4–2 (a.e.t.)	Loughborough Foxes	
46	Market Warsop	H–W	St Patricks	
W/O for Market Warsop
47	Marlow	1–7	Bracknell Town	
48	Norton & Stockton Ancients	H–W	Stokesley	
W/O for Norton & Stockton Ancients
49	Old Actonians	6–0	Hampton	
50	Oldland Abbotonians	0–1	Wycombe Wanderers	
51	Ossett Albion	4–1	Dearne & District	
52	Oxford United	0–1	Swindon Spitfires	
53	Pegasus	0–3	Lichfield Diamonds	
54	Penrith AFC	3–1	Wirral	
55	Peterborough Sports	1–0	Hethersett Athletic	
56	Prudhoe Town	0–5	Blyth Spartans	
57	Reading Girls	2–6	MK Wanderers	
58	Regents Park Rangers	2–1	Wingate & Finchley	
59	Sandy	1–2	St Martins	
60	Sawbridgeworth Town	2–4	C&K Basildon	
61	Shanklin	1–1 (2–3 p)	Horley Town	
62	Sheffield United Junior Blades	0–1	Huddersfield Town	
63	Shepshed Dynamo	1–2	Rolls Royce Leisure	
64	Sherrardswood	1–7	Saffron Walden Town	
65	Southampton Saints	0–2	Havant & Waterlooville	
66	St Francis 2000	1–3	York City	
67	Stafford Town	6–2	Redditch United	
68	Stoke City	4–0	Bourne United	
69	Stoke Lane Athletic	3–6	Cheltenham Town	
70	Stony Stratford Town	0–4	Launton	
71	Stratford Town	0–3	Dudley United	
72	Studley	2–1	Hereford Phoenix	
73	Tamworth Lionesses	5–3	Stourport Swifts	
74	Tetbury Town	3–2	Bitton	
75	Uxbridge United	0–15	Haringey Borough	
76	Walsall	0–4	Leamington Lions	
77	Warrington Town	3–3 (3–4 p)	Sefton Peronni	
78	Whitley Bay	12–0	Boldon	
79	Wigan	6–1	Bolton Wanderers	
80	Windscale	1–6	Wigan Athletic	
81	Winsford	3–4	Preston Rangers	
82	Winterton Rangers	2–12	Guiseley AFC Vixens	
83	Woodbridge Town	9–0	Cambridge University	
84	Woodley Saints	2–1 (a.e.t.)	Beaconsfield SYCOB	

== Second round qualifying ==
All games were played on 12 October 2008.

Tie	Home team (tier)	Score	Away team (tier)	Att.
1	AFC Wimbledon	7–0	Manford Way	
2	Andover New Street	1–6	Havant & Waterlooville	
3	Arlesey Town	1–4	Bedford	
4	Barnsley	2–3	Guiseley AFC Vixens	
5	Blyth Spartans	11–0	Forest Hall	
6	Bracknell Town	4–0	Chippenham Town	
7	Brentford	0–5	Tower Hamlets	
8	Bury Girls & Ladies	9–2	Preston Rangers	
9	Buxton	1–4	Rolls Royce Leisure	
10	C&K Basildon	2–5	Dagenham & Redbridge	
11	Cheltenham Town	3–1	Launton	
12	Chinnor	3–1	Banbury United	
13	Darlington Railway Athletic	8–1	Brandon United	
14	Deal Town	2–4	London Corinthians	
15	Dudley United	3–1	Tamworth Lionesses	
16	Ebbsfleet United	1–0	Maidstone Town	
17	Gedling Town	2–5	Mansfield Town	
18	Hannakins	0–3	Garston	
19	Horley Town	5–1	Aldershot Town	
20	Huddersfield Town	2–4	Ossett Albion	
21	Ilminster Town	3–6 (a.e.t.)	Larkhall Athletic	

Tie	Home team (tier)	Score	Away team (tier)	Att.
22	Launceston	1–4	Frome Town	
23	Lichfield Diamonds	1–0	Leamington Lions	
24	Maidenhead United	6–0	Tetbury Town	
25	Market Warsop	3–5	Friar Lane & Epworth	
26	Old Actonians	1–4	Haringey Borough	
27	Penrith AFC	2–1	Middleton Athletic	
28	Peterborough Sports	2–2 (?–? p)	Woodbridge Town	
29	Regents Park Rangers	0–3	Panthers	
30	Royston Town	1–2	Barking	
31	Saffron Walden Town	1–4	Brentwood Town	
32	Sandiacre Town	3–2 (a.e.t.)	Clifton	
33	Sefton Peronni	0–1 (a.e.t.)	Wigan Athletic	
34	St Martins	1–2	Corby Stewarts & Lloyds	
35	Stafford Town	5–2	Birmingham Athletic	
36	Stoke City	3–0	Studley	
37	Swindon Spitfires	3–2	MK Wanderers	
38	West Lynn	7–0	Huntingdon Town	
39	Whitley Bay	3–0	Norton & Stockton Ancients	
40	Wigan	1–7	Liverpool Feds	
41	Woodley Saints	0–4	Wycombe Wanderers	
42	York City	4–0	Lumley	

== Third round qualifying ==
All games were played on 26 October, 2 and 9 November 2008

Tie	Home team (tier)	Score	Away team (tier)	Att.
1	Bedford	4–0	Corby Stewarts & Lloyds	
2	Blyth Spartans	6–10 (a.e.t.)	Darlington Railway Athletic	
3	Brentwood Town	0–1	Dagenham & Redbridge	
4	Bury Girls & Ladies	3–1	Wigan Athletic	
5	Frome Town	1–0	Larkhall Athletic	
6	Garston	0–2	Barking	
7	Guiseley AFC Vixens	4–2 (a.e.t.)	Ossett Albion	
8	AFC Wimbledon	3–2	Haringey Borough	
9	Horley Town	0–5	Havant & Waterlooville	
10	Lichfield Diamonds	1–1 (4–3 p)	Dudley United	
11	Liverpool Feds	4–0	Penrith AFC	

Tie	Home team (tier)	Score	Away team (tier)	Att.
12	London Corinthians	1–3	Ebbsfleet United	
13	Maidenhead United	7–3	Chinnor	
14	Mansfield Town	2–1 (a.e.t.)	Rolls Royce Leisure	
15	Peterborough Sports	4–1	West Lynn	
16	Sandiacre Town	7–0	Friar Lane & Epworth	
17	Stafford Town	1–3	Stoke City	
18	Swindon Spitfires	0–8	Bracknell Town	
19	Tower Hamlets	2–1	Panthers	
20	Whitley Bay	0–2	York City	
21	Wycombe Wanderers	3–3 (3–4 p)	Cheltenham Town	

== First round proper ==
All games were scheduled for 9 and 16 November 2008.

Tie	Home team (tier)	Score	Away team (tier)	Att.
1	AFC Team Bath	2–0	Winscombe	
2	Bedford Town Bells	2–0	Reading Town	
3	Bury Girls & Ladies	3–5	Rochdale	
4	Cambridge United	0–4	Wolverhampton Wanderers	
5	Coventry United	3–2 (a.e.t.)	Copsewood Coventry	
6	Dagenham & Redbridge	2–3	Luton Town	
7	Derby County	4–0	Mansfield Town	
8	Ebbsfleet United	1–3	Wellingborough Diamonds	
9	Enfield Town	3–0	Queens Park Rangers	
10	Frome Town	2–4	Forest Green Rovers	
11	Guiseley AFC Vixens	4–1	Peterlee RA	
12	Havant & Waterlooville	2–0	Barking	
13	Leafield Athletic	3–3 (5–3 p)	West Bromwich Albion	
14	Leeds City Vixens	4–0	Crewe Alexandra	
15	Lewes	9–0	Tower Hamlets	

Tie	Home team (tier)	Score	Away team (tier)	Att.
16	Lichfield Diamonds	3–4	Leicester City Ladies	
17	Liverpool Feds	4–2 (a.e.t.)	Salford	
18	Loughborough Students	3–2	Sandiacre Town	
19	Maidenhead United	0–1	Swindon Town	
20	Northampton Town	4–1	Bedford	
21	Norwich City	1–0	AFC Wimbledon	
22	Scunthorpe United	1–2	Darlington Railway Athletic	
23	Stockport County	0–1	Bradford City	
24	Stoke City	6–2	Peterborough Sports	
25	The New Saints & Shrewsbury Town	5–0	Brackwell Town	
26	Tottenham Hotspur	3–1	Oxford City	
27	Wakefield & Morley Spurs	2–4	Blackpool Wren Rovers	
28	Welwyn Garden City	0–2	Chesham United	
29	West Auckland Town	0–2	Middlesbrough	
30	Yeovil Town	2–8	Plymouth Argyle	

== Second round proper ==
All games were originally scheduled for 23 and 30 November and 7 December 2008.

Tie	Home team (tier)	Score	Away team (tier)	Att.
1	AFC Team Bath	0–6	Plymouth Argyle	
2	Blackpool Wren Rovers	3–1	Rochdale	
3	Enfield Town	1–0	Norwich City	
4	Forest Green Rovers	2–0	Cheltenham Town	
5	Guiseley AFC Vixens	0–2	Derby County	
6	Havant & Waterlooville	1–2	Chesham United	
7	Leafield Athletic	0–3	Wolverhampton Wanderers	
8	Leeds City Vixens	6–3	Bradford City	
9	Bedford Town Bells	0–6	Lewes	
10	Middlesbrough	3–2	Darlington Railway Athletic	
11	Stoke City	1–2	Loughborough Students	
12	Swindon Town	2–6	Luton Town	
13	The New Saints & Shrewsbury Town	2–2 (1–4 p)	Coventry City	
14	Tottenham Hotspur	1–4	Northampton Town	
15	Wellingborough Diamonds	6–1	Leicester City Ladies	
16	York City	2–1 (a.e.t.)	Liverpool Feds	

== Third round proper ==
All games were originally scheduled for 14 and 21 December 2008 and 4 January 2009.

Tie	Home team (tier)	Score	Away team (tier)	Att.
1	Aston Villa	4–1	Wolverhampton Wanderers	
2	Brighton & Hove Albion	0–1	Luton Town	
3	Cardiff City	1–1 (4–3 p)	Keynsham Town	
4	Charlton Athletic	2–1	Ipswich Town	
5	Crystal Palace	4–3	Reading	
6	Curzon Ashton	5–0	Blackpool Wren Rovers	
7	Enfield Town	0–1	Colchester United	
8	Leeds City Vixens	1–6	Sunderland	
9	Leicester City	3–1	Coventry United	
10	Lewes	3–3 (3–2 p)	Chesham United	

Tie	Home team (tier)	Score	Away team (tier)	Att.
11	Loughborough Students	0–2	OOH Lincoln	
12	Newcastle United	3–3 (8–7 p)	Manchester City	
13	Millwall Lionesses	2–0	West Ham United	
14	Newquay	0–4	Portsmouth	
15	Northampton Town	0–5	Barnet	
16	Plymouth Argyle	0–2	Forest Green Rovers	
17	Rotherham United	2–1	York City	
18	Sheffield Wednesday	3–3 (4–5 p)	Preston North End	
19	Tranmere Rovers	1–3	Middlesbrough	
20	Wellingborough Diamonds	1–5	Derby County	

== Fourth round proper ==
All games were originally scheduled for 4, 11 and 18 January 2009.

4 January 2009	Doncaster Rovers Belles (1)	0–1	Millwall Lionesses (2)	Doncaster
		Report	Whitter 15'	Stadium: Keepmoat Stadium

4 January 2009	Chelsea (1)	9–1	Rotherham United (2)	Molesey
	Chaplen 3'; Stoney 8', 13'; Aluko 16', 27', 40'; Susi 22'; Hanson 60' (o.g.); Spence 88'	Report	Lynskey	Stadium: Imber Court; Referee: F Griffiths

4 January 2009	Nottingham Forest (1)	0–1	Liverpool (1)
		Report	Forster
Note: Tie awarded to Nottingham Forest - Liverpool removed for fielding an ineligible player.

4 January 2009	Sunderland (2)	4–1	Cardiff City (2)	Hetton-le-Hole
	Gutteridge; S. Williams; Devine	Report	Atkins	Stadium: The Hetton Centre

4 January 2009	Leicester City (2)	2–4	Middlesbrough (3)	Blaby
	H. Smith; Allen	Report	Close; Duckling	Stadium: Leicestershire Scout HQ

4 January 2009	OOH Lincoln (2)	0–1	Curzon Ashton (2)
		Report	Lambourne 83'
Note: Tie awarded to OOH Lincoln Ladies - Curzon Ashton removed for fielding an ineligible player.

4 January 2009	Derby County (3)	3–3 (a.e.t.) (4–3 p)	Lewes (3)	Derby
	Wayne; Pashley; Jeffrey	Report	Trafford; Whitten	Stadium: Moor Farm
	Penalties
	Penalty missed Penalty scored		Penalty scored Penalty missed

11 January 2009	Arsenal (1)	7–0	Colchester United (2)	Borehamwood
	Chapman 38', 42'; Little 49', 55', 78'; Lander 63'; Bassett 83'	Report		Stadium: Meadow Park

11 January 2009	Leeds Carnegie (1)	7–0	Forest Green Rovers (3)
	Houghton; S. Smith; Moore; Sutcliffe; Ward	Report

11 January 2009	Manchester City (2)	4–3 (a.e.t.)	Preston North End (2)	Flixton
	Penney; Johnson	Report	Catterkey; Cadwallader; Watson	Stadium: Valley Road Stadium

18 January 2009	Everton (1)	4–0	Fulham (1)	Crosby
	Duggan; Dowie; Scott; Easton	Report		Stadium: Rossett Park

18 January 2009	Watford (1)	1–3	Bristol Academy (1)	Northwood
	Burrows	Report	Bartlett; Lorton	Stadium: Skyline Roofing Stadium

18 January 2009	Blackburn Rovers (1)	3–0	Luton Town (3)	Clitheroe
	Burke; Anderton; McDougall	Report		Stadium: Shawbridge

18 January 2009	Charlton Athletic (2)	0–6	Birmingham City (1)	Dartford
		Report	Hall; Potter; Bird; Foster; Torkildsen	Stadium: Princes Park

18 January 2009	Crystal Palace (2)	1–2 (a.e.t.)	Aston Villa (2)	Whyteleafe
	Longville	Report	Davies; Clarke	Stadium: Church Road

18 January 2009	Barnet (2)	2–1	Portsmouth (2)	Perivale
	Sandlow; C. Williams	Report	Ritchie	Stadium: Reynolds Field; Referee: Ashley Hyne

== Fifth round proper ==
All games were played on 25 January and 1 February 2009.

25 January 2009	Middlesbrough (3)	0–4	Arsenal (1)	Stokesley
		Report	Lander 54', 66'; Little 57'; Carney 84'	Stadium: Bishopton Road West

25 January 2009	Aston Villa (2)	0–3	Leeds Carnegie (1)	Sutton Coldfield
		Report	Cantrell 11', 75'; Clarke 74'	Stadium: Central Ground

25 January 2009	Manchester City (2)	0–4	Everton (1)	Flixton
		Report	Scott; Duggan; Evans	Stadium: Valley Road Stadium

25 January 2009	OOH Lincoln (2)	3–1	Nottingham Forest (1)	Collingham
	Barker; Michalska; Cook	Report	Bell	Stadium: Station Road

25 January 2009	Sunderland (2)	5–0	Barnet (2)	Hetton-le-Hole
	McDougall; Gutteridge; S. Williams; Nobbs; Devine	Report		Stadium: The Hetton Centre

1 February 2009	Derby County	0–2	Chelsea (1)	Mickleover
		Report	Sanderson 24' (pen.), 50' (pen.)	Stadium: Station Road

1 February 2009	Millwall Lionesses (2)	0–1	Blackburn Rovers (1)	East Dulwich
		Report	Preston	Stadium: Champion Hill

1 February 2009	Bristol Academy (1)	2–2 (a.e.t.) (4–3 p)	Birmingham City (1)	Almondsbury
	Bartlett	Report	Hall; Bird	Stadium: Scott Park
	Penalties
	Bartlett (penalty scored)		Penalty missed Penalty scored

== Quarter–finals ==
All games were played on 22 February 2009.

22 February 2009	Arsenal (1)	3–1	Leeds Carnegie (1)	Borehamwood
14:00 GMT	Telford 15' (o.g.); Ludlow 21'; Davison 77'	Report	Moore 26'	Stadium: Meadow Park

22 February 2009	Blackburn Rovers (1)	0–2	Everton (1)	Clitheroe
		Report	F. Williams 20'; Dowie 22'	Stadium: Shawbridge

22 February 2009	Chelsea (1)	3–1	OOH Lincoln (2)	East Molesey
	Aluko 44', 58'; Susi 48'	Report	Michalska 4'	Stadium: Imber Court

22 February 2009	Sunderland (2)	4–2 (a.e.t.)	Bristol Academy (1)	Cleadon
	Stokes 66'; S. Williams 68', 112'; Bronze 120'	Report	Harries 23', 31'	Stadium: Academy of Light

== Semi–finals ==
All games were played on 22 March 2009.

22 March 2009	Arsenal (1)	3–1	Everton (1)	Bishop's Stortford
14:00 GMT	Yankey 21'; Ludlow 31'; Flaherty 45'	Report	Dowie 54'	Stadium: Woodside Park; Attendance: 902; Referee: Stephen Daly

22 March 2009	Sunderland (2)	3–0	Chelsea (1)	Sunderland
13:00 BST	Gutteridge 72'; S. Williams 81', 90'	Report		Stadium: Stadium of Light; Attendance: 1,080; Referee: Natalie Walker

== Final ==
4 May 2009
13:00 BST

Arsenal	2–1	Sunderland
Chapman 32'; Little 90+2'	Report	McDougall 90+7'

Pride Park Stadium, Derby
Attendance: 23,291
Referee: Saša Ihringová (Shropshire)
