= 2008–09 FA Women's Premier League Cup =

18th English women's top-flight 2nd-tier cup competition

Tournament details
- Country: England

Final positions
- Champions: Arsenal
- Runners-up: Doncaster Rovers Belles

The 2008–09 FA Women's Premier League Cup was the 18th staging of the FA Women's Premier League Cup, a knockout competition for England's top 36 women's football clubs.

The tournament was won by Arsenal, who beat Doncaster Rovers Belles 5–0 in the final; this was Arsenal's tenth title.

== Results ==
=== Preliminary round ===
All played on 31 August 2008.

31 August 2008	Colchester United (S)	5–6	Portsmouth (S)
	Bass	Report	Crewe; Hillier; Langrish; Rutherford; Thorp; Ritchie

31 August 2008	Newcastle United (NO)	1–2	Preston North End (NO)
	Reay	Report	Cafferkey; Cadwallader

31 August 2008	Reading (S)	0–2	Barnet (S)
		Report	Sandow; Sowden

31 August 2008	Sunderland (NO)	4–1	Sheffield Wednesday (NO)
	Danby; Gutteridge; Stokes; O'Brien	Report	Skeemer

=== First round ===
All played 14 September, except Tranmere Rovers vs. Doncaster Rovers Belles on 21 September.

14 September 2008	Arsenal (NA)	6–2	Charlton Athletic (S)	Borehamwood
14:00	Yankey 1', 82', 84'; Flaherty 13'; Little 39'; K. Smith 39'	Report	Dixson 70'; Webb	Stadium: Meadow Park

14 September 2008	Brighton & Hove Albion (S)	3–2	Truro City (S)
	Parkinson; Stenning; Waine	Report	Dennett; Lapham

14 September 2008	Bristol Academy (NA)	3–0	Keynsham Town (S)
	Green; Green	Report

14 September 2008	Cardiff City (S)	1–2	Fulham (NA)
	Harding	Report	Fraser; Lloyd

14 September 2008	Millwall Lionesses (S)	7–1	Ipswich Town (S)
	Eagles; Gurr; Whitter	Report	Harwood

14 September 2008	Watford (NA)	3–0	Crystal Palace (S)
	Clarke; Lander; Wiltshire	Report

14 September 2008	Blackburn Rovers (NA)	7–2	Rotherham United (NO)
	Anderton; Harding; McDougall; Preston	Report	Longstone; Needham

14 September 2008	Everton (NA)	2–1	Birmingham City (NA)
	J. Scott; Westwood 65'	Report	McCann 46'

14 September 2008	Leeds Carnegie (NA)	1–0	Manchester City (NO)
	Clarke	Report

14 September 2008	Leicester City (NO)	6–2	Aston Villa (NO)
	Allen; Jones; H. Smith; Fellows	Report	Davies; Farrow

14 September 2008	Nottingham Forest (NA)	4–2	Liverpool (NA)
	Bell; Clarke; Lawson	Report	Edwards; Formston

14 September 2008	West Ham United (S)	1–2	Portsmouth (S)
	Morgan	Report	Langrish; Murphy

14 September 2008	Chelsea (NA)	4–0	Barnet (S)
	Rafferty; Sanderson; Susi	Report

14 September 2008	Preston North End (NO)	5–3	Curzon Ashton (NO)
	Berry; Bateman; Cafferkey; Cadwallader	Report	Dean; Goodwin; Stebbings

14 September 2008	OOH Lincoln (NO)	3–1	Sunderland (NO)
	Barr; Michalska; Wallis	Report	Danby

21 September 2008	Tranmere Rovers (NO)	1–6	Doncaster Rovers Belles (NA)
	Cartmel	Report	Holmes; Rich; R. Williams; Hansen

=== Second round ===
All played 5 October, except the games at Nottingham Forest, Fulham and Millwall: all played on 12 October.

5 October 2008	OOH Lincoln	2–3	Watford
	Little; Ward	Report	Nicholson; Hincks; Clarke 88'

5 October 2008	Blackburn Rovers (NA)	4–4 (a.e.t.) (3–4 p)	Portsmouth (S)
	Anderton 70'; Preston	Report	Ritchie 120'; Langrish

5 October 2008	Arsenal (NA)	3–1	Everton (NA)	Borehamwood
14:00	Carney 38' (pen.); Little 43', 48'	Report	F. Williams 78'	Stadium: Meadow Park

5 October 2008	Preston North End (NO)	1–0	Brighton & Hove Albion (S)
	Cafferkey	Report

5 October 2008	Chelsea (NA)	3–2 (a.e.t.)	Leeds Carnegie (NA)
	Bradley (o.g.); Chaplen; Aluko 94'	Report	Cantrell; S. Smith

12 October 2008	Nottingham Forest (NO)	0–4	Doncaster Rovers Belles (NA)
		Report	Exley; R. Williams; Hansen

12 October 2008	Fulham (NA)	2–2 (a.e.t.) (4–2 p)	Bristol Academy (NA)
	Phillips; Burns	Report	Manley; Yorston
	Penalties
	Penalty scored		Penalty scored Penalty missed

12 October 2008	Millwall Lionesses (S)	1–3	Leicester City (NO)
	Eagles	Report	Fellows; Allen

=== Quarter–finals ===
All played 2 November, except Leicester City vs. Arsenal on 9 November.

2 November 2008	Portsmouth (S)	0–1	Preston North End (NO)
		Report	Watson 50'

2 November 2008	Doncaster Rovers Belles (NA)	3–0	Watford (NA)
	Heckler; Exley; R. Williams 67'	Report

2 November 2008	Chelsea (NA)	3–0	Fulham (NA)
	Rafferty 19'; Owen 66'; Sanderson 90'	Report

9 November 2008	Leicester City (NO)	0–7	Arsenal (NA)	Leicester
14:00		Report	Yankey 15'; K. Smith 37' (pen.); Fleeting 40', 62', 74'; Impey 50' (o.g.); C. Grant 83'	Stadium: Leicestershire Scouts HQ

=== Semi–finals ===
Both played 7 December.

7 December 2008	Doncaster Rovers Belles (NA)	3–1	Preston North End (NO)
	R. Williams 6'; Heckley 7'; Davies 46'	Report	Bateman 39'

7 December 2008	Chelsea (NA)	0–4	Arsenal (NA)	East Molesey
14:00		Report	Perry 19' (o.g.); Fleeting 56', 88'; Ludlow 79'	Stadium: Imber Court

=== Final ===
25 February 2009
14:00

Doncaster Rovers Belles	0–5	Arsenal
	Report	K. Smith 6', 31', 58'; A. Scott 66'; S. Grant 88'

Glanford Park, Scunthorpe
Attendance: 2,753
Referee: Steve Rowntree

== See also ==
- 2008–09 FA Women's Premier League
- 2009 FA Women's Cup final
