= 2009 FA Women's Cup final =

English football cup final

2009 FA Women's Cup Final
- The match programme cover
- Event: 2008–09 FA Women's Cup
Arsenal	Sunderland
2	1
- Date: 4 May 2009
- Venue: Pride Park Stadium, Derby
- Player of the Match: Lucy Bronze (Sunderland)
- Referee: Saša Ihringová (Shropshire)
- Attendance: 23,291

The 2009 FA Women's Cup Final was the 39th final of the FA Women's Cup, England's primary cup competition for women's football teams. It was the 16th final to be held under the direct control of the Football Association (FA). The final was contested between Arsenal and Sunderland at Pride Park Stadium in Derby on 4 May 2009. Arsenal won the game 2–1 to secure their fourth successive FA Cup triumph and their tenth in total. The match was attended by a crowd of 23,291.

== Match ==
=== Summary ===
Arsenal, managed by Vic Akers, reached their fourth FA Women's Cup final in succession after a 3–1 victory against Everton in the semi-finals, while Premier League Northern Division side Sunderland, managed by Mick Mulhern, reached their first ever final in the competition after beating Chelsea 3–0 at the Stadium of Light, becoming the first team from outside the top flight to do so since Fulham in 2002.

Arsenal, who came into the game as favourites, dominated the vast majority of the match, with Gemma Davison and Kim Little creating several chances in the opening minutes. Sunderland created their first half chance as Sophie Williams chased a long ball down the left and crossed, but Niamh Fahey's challenge was enough to prevent Jordan Nobbs getting in a clean shot on goal. Arsenal hit back with Little striking over from distance and Davison drawing a save from Sunderland goalkeeper Helen Alderson after cutting in from the left. An angled shot from Suzanne Grant slid underneath Alderson, but Lucy Bronze managed to prevent Rachel Yankey from scoring with a last-ditch clearance. Arsenal took the lead just after the half hour, when Alderson failed to hold Davison's shot and Katie Chapman followed up to score from the rebound. The Gunners had a chance to double their lead two minutes ahead of the break, when Little slotted a good ball through to Grant, but her shot went wide of the far post.

Arsenal had most of the possession in the second half, but their second goal came in injury time, when Chapman chipped the ball into the path of Little, who got round Alderson before tucking the ball into the empty net. Kelly McDougall pulled one back for Sunderland in the seventh minute of stoppage time, whose length was dictated by Sophie Williams having to receive more than five minutes of treatment after suffering a seizure.

=== Details ===
4 May 2009
13:00 BST

Arsenal	2–1	Sunderland
Chapman 32'; Little 90+2'	Report	McDougall 90+7'

Pride Park Stadium, Derby
Attendance: 23,291
Referee: Saša Ihringová (Shropshire)

Arsenal	Sunderland

GK	1	(Republic of Ireland) Emma Byrne
DF	15	(England) Laura Bassett	(substituted off) 90+4'
DF	7	(Republic of Ireland) Ciara Grant
DF	5	(England) Gilly Flaherty
DF	19	(Republic of Ireland) Niamh Fahey
MF	17	(England) Katie Chapman
MF	4	(Wales) Jayne Ludlow (c)
MF	12	(England) Gemma Davison	(substituted off) 82'
MF	11	(England) Rachel Yankey
FW	16	(Scotland) Kim Little
FW	9	(Scotland) Suzanne Grant	(substituted off) 58'
Substitutes:
DF	6	(England) Faye White	(substituted on) 90+4'
FW	20	(Wales) Helen Lander	(substituted on) 58'
MF	18	(Scotland) Natalie Ross	(substituted on) 82'
GK	13	(Jamaica) Becky Spencer
DF	21	(Saint Lucia) Eartha Pond
Manager:
(England) Vic Akers

GK	1	(England) Helen Alderson
DF	2	(England) Lucy Bronze
DF	5	(England) Stephanie Bannon (c)
DF	6	(England) Victoria Greenwell	(yellow card) 88'
DF	3	(England) Sophie Halliday
MF	7	(England) Lucy Staniforth
MF	4	(England) Jordan Nobbs
MF	8	(England) Kelly McDougall
FW	9	(England) Sophie Williams		(substituted off) 58'
FW	10	(United States) Natalia Gutteridge		(substituted off) 84'
FW	11	(England) Demi Stokes
Substitutes:
FW	12	(England) Nicola Devine		(substituted on) 58'
MF	14	(England) Sarah Danby		(substituted on) 84'
GK		(England) Rachael Laws
MF		(England) Steph O'Brien
DF		(England) Abbey Holmes
Manager:
(England) Mick Mulhern

Player of the match
Lucy Bronze (Sunderland)

Assistant referees:
Emma Everson
Sarah Garratt
Fourth official:
Sian Massey-Ellis

Match rules

- 90 minutes.
- 30 minutes of extra-time if necessary.
- Penalty shoot-out if scores still level.
- Five named substitutes.
- Maximum of three substitutions.
