= 2009 FA Cup =

2009 FA Cup may refer to:

- 2008–09 FA Cup
  - 2009 FA Cup final
- 2008–09 FA Women's Cup
  - 2009 FA Women's Cup final
- 2009–10 FA Cup
- 2009–10 FA Women's Cup
