= Helen Alderson (footballer) =

Retired English footballer

Personal information
- Date of birth: 7 May 1989 (age 37)
- Height: 1.68 m (5 ft 6 in)
- Position: Goalkeeper

International career
Years	Team	Apps	(Gls)
2008	England U23		

Helen Alderson (born 7 May 1989) is a retired English footballer who played for Sunderland A.F.C.

== Early life and education ==
Alderson was born on 7 May 1989. She attended Loughborough University.

== Career ==
In 2008, at 18 years old, Alderson was selected to play for England's national under-23 women's football team to play in the Five Nations La Manga Tournament. The following year, her team played in the finals for the Women's FA Cup.

Alderson also played for Sunderland Ladies, as well as for the Lady Black Cats in the Women's Super League.

"Aldo" is a cult-hero at her last club, Durham WFC, where she wore the number 1 shirt from 2015 to 2018 making 60 appearances.

In 2021, Alderson helped launch the "Helen Aldo GK all-female goalkeeping camp, which is the first of its kind in the North East."

== Honours ==
- Women's FA Cup runner-up: 2009
