= Abbie Prosser =

English footballer

Personal information
- Full name: Abbie Prosser
- Date of birth: 4 September 1991 (age 35)
- Place of birth: England
- Height: 1.72 m (5 ft 8 in)
- Position: Midfielder

Youth career
- 2001–2008: Arsenal

Senior career*
Years	Team	Apps	(Gls)
2008–2010	Arsenal	2	(0)
2010–2011	Barnet		
2011	Doncaster Rovers Belles	7	(0)
2011–2013	Barnet		

International career
2009–2010	England under 19	18	(1)
- * Club domestic league appearances and goals

Abbie Prosser (born 4 September 1991) is an English former association football midfielder, who played for Arsenal, Barnet and Doncaster Rovers Belles. Prosser has represented the England women's national football team at under-19 level.

== Club career ==
Prosser started off playing for Arsenal Ladies from the age of nine in 2001, and made her first team debut in a 5–0 FA Women's Premier League win at Fulham on 19 March 2009.

She signed for Barnet in summer 2010, winning the 2010–11 FA Women's Premier League Cup, before moving to play for Doncaster Rovers Belles in May 2011, where she made seven Women's Super League appearances.

== International career ==
For the England women's national under-19 football team, Prosser played 18 matches, scoring one goal. Prosser was in the England 2010 FIFA U-20 Women's World Cup squad in Germany.

== Family ==
Prosser is the sister of Luke Prosser, who is also a footballer. Luke revealed in 2019 that Abbie had stopped playing after falling out of love with football.
