= Sarah Quantrill =

English football goalkeeper

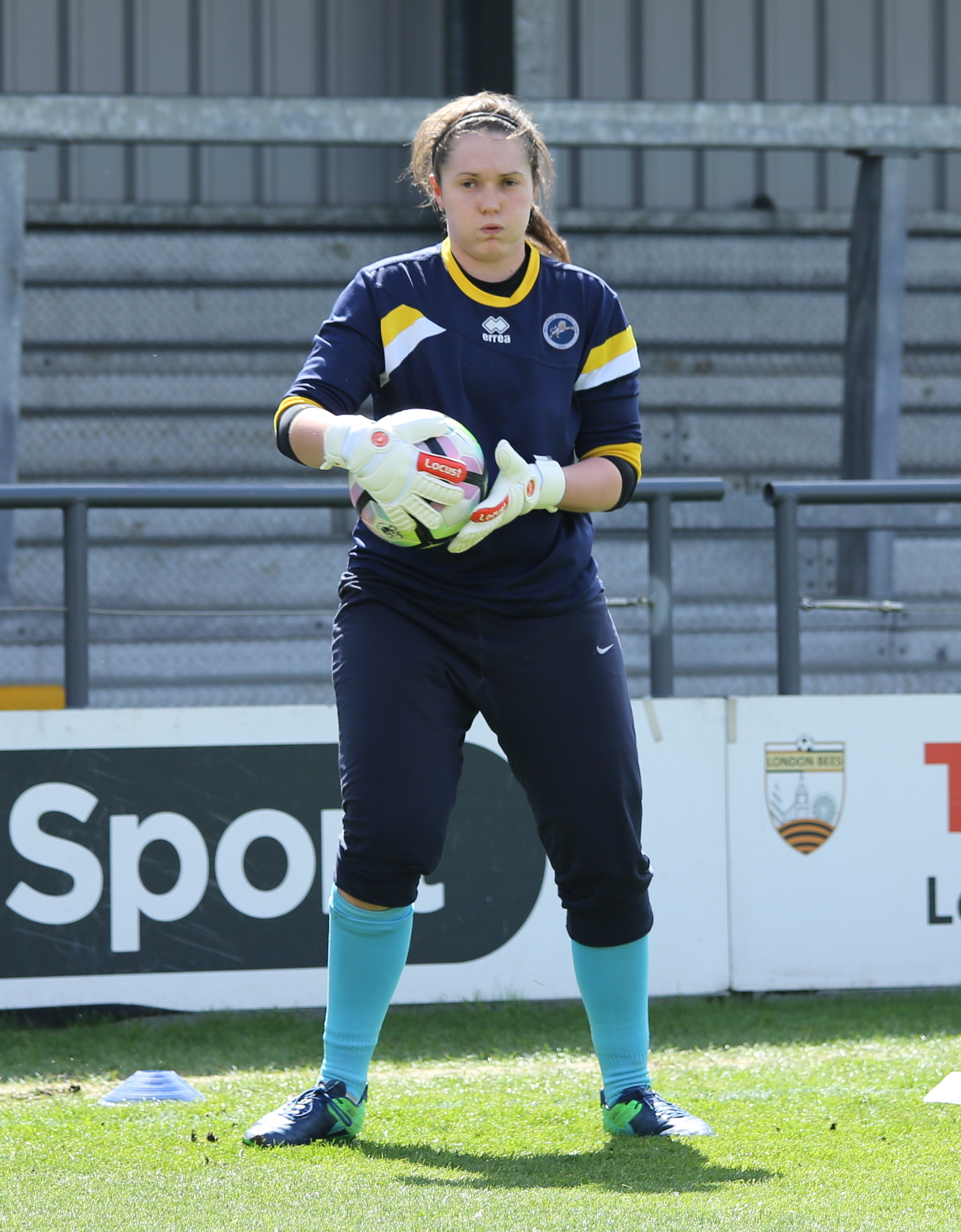
- Sarah Quantrill training with Millwall Lionesses in 2017

Personal information
- Date of birth: 21 July 1990 (age 36)
- Height: 1.70 m (5 ft 7 in)
- Position: Goalkeeper

Sarah Quantrill (born 21 July 1990) is an English football goalkeeper who last played for Norwich City.

== Club career ==
Quantrill began her career at Norwich City, later playing for Arsenal and Chelsea before joining Liverpool in 2012.

She later played for Millwall Lionesses before signing with London Bees in 2018 under manager Luke Swindlehurst, who previously coached her at Liverpool. After a stint with rivals Ipswich Town, Quantrill returned to her childhood club, Norwich City, in 2023.

Quantrill left Norwich in June 2026, shortly after helping the club win promotion to the third tier through the playoffs.

== Honours ==
Arsenal

- FA Women's Premier League Cup

2008–09
