= Emma McDougall =

English footballer

Personal information
- Date of birth: 6 March 1991
- Place of birth: Droylsden, Manchester, England
- Date of death: 20 February 2013 (aged 21)
- Place of death: Ashton-under-Lyne, Manchester, England
- Position: Winger

Youth career
- –2008: Fletcher Moss Rangers

Senior career*
Years	Team	Apps	(Gls)
2008–2013	Blackburn Rovers Ladies	30	(5)
- * Club domestic league appearances and goals

Emma McDougall (born Emma Burnley; 6 March 1991 – 20 February 2013) was an English female football winger who played for Blackburn Rovers Ladies. Her married name was Emma Mincher, but she used her maiden name in her playing career. She was born in Droylsden, Manchester.

== Club career ==
McDougall joined Blackburn from Fletcher Moss Rangers in January 2008, and made her first-team debut in a 17–0 Lancashire Cup win the following month. She appeared as a substitute in three of Rovers' final Premier League games that season and, after a formal promotion to the senior side, played more regularly in the 2008–09 season.

Her first Blackburn goals came in September 2008, scoring twice as Rovers beat Rotherham United Ladies 7–2 in the first round of the Women's Premier League Cup. McDougall made thirty appearances for Blackburn, scoring five goals for the club before her illness forced her to stop playing.

McDougall was known for her skill and pace, earning the nickname 'The Roadrunner' among fans.

== Later years ==
McDougall was diagnosed with ovarian cancer in 2009, the day before her 18th birthday. Despite being told she would never have children, she and her partner welcomed their first child in 2011, and their second the following year. Not long after her second daughter's birth, McDougall was rediagnosed with cancer for the second time. She got married in July 2012 to her long-term partner Stefan; both lifelong Manchester City fans, the couple held their wedding reception at the Etihad Stadium.

McDougall died on 20 February 2013 at age 21. She is survived by her husband and two daughters, Lilly-Mae and Molly-Rae Mincher. After her death, her husband Stefan launched the Emma Mincher Foundation to raise awareness of ovarian cancer and money for related charities.

== Statistics ==
Club	Season	League		WFA Cup		Premier League Cup		County Cup		Other		Total	
Club	Season	Apps	Goals	Apps	Goals	Apps	Goals	Apps	Goals	Apps	Goals	Apps	Goals
Blackburn Rovers Ladies	2007–08	3	0	0	0	0	0	1	0	0	0	4	0
Blackburn Rovers Ladies	2008–09	17	0	3	1	2	2	4	2	0	0	26	5
Blackburn Rovers Ladies	2009–10	0	0	0	0	0	0	0	0	0	0	0	0
Career total		20	0	3	1	2	2	5	2	0	0	30	5
