= Colchester United W.F.C. =

English football club

Colchester United Women's Football Club
- Full name: Colchester United Women's Football Club
- Nickname: The U's
- Founded: July 2023
- Ground: Colchester Garrison B Ground, Circular Road North, Colchester, CO2 7SZ
- Head Coach: Milly Morgan
- League: Eastern Region Women's Football League
- Website: www.cu-fc.com
| Home colours | Away colours |

Colchester United Women's Football Club, commonly referred to as The U's unless distinguishing themselves from the men's team, is an English women's association football club based in the city of Colchester, Essex, England formed in July 2023. The club plays in the Division One South of the Eastern Region Women's Football League, step 6 of the English women's football league system.

== History ==
After a ten-year absence of a women's football team at Colchester United, following the folding of Colchester United L.F.C. in 2013, the Colchester United Community Foundation unveiled plans to reform the women's team in time for the 2023–24 season. The foundation held open trials for prospective players at Shrub End Community Sports Centre over three consecutive weeks beginning on 21 June 2023, with successful players being informed of their position that July. The founding of Colchester United Women F.C was confirmed at Colchester United's annual open day held at the Colchester Community Stadium on Sunday 16 July, along with the appointment of Luke Worley as head coach.

Pre-season friendlies for the inaugural season took place during August 2023. The team's first match of the league season took place against Chelmsford City Reserves on Sunday 10 September, with Colchester winning 11–0.

Coach Luke Worley stepped down from the role of head coach in December 2023, with assistant coach Millie Morgan and goalkeeping coach Carl Oliver taking an interim role before the club announced that Simon King had been appointed as head coach in February 2024

On 19 May 2024, Colchester contested the Essex Women's League Cup Final, defeating Southminster United Ladies First 6-0 having beaten Premier Division team Chelmsford City Women in the semi-final. Since Colchester had also gone the entire league season without defeat, the team were able to secure the league and cup double in their first season. The team were promoted to the Essex County Women's Football League Premier Division for the 2024–25 season.

On 26 February the club announced through its Instagram page that Simon King had stepped down as head coach due to personal reasons after one year in charge. King had led the team to promotion and a League Cup victory in their first-ever season. Milly Morgan was appointed as interim head coach until the end of the season. On 1 June the club announced that Morgan had been given the role permanently.

Colchester ended the season in second place and were promoted to the Eastern Region Women's Football League at step 6 on the pyramid for the 2025/26 season.

== Colours and crest ==
The team uses the same kit worn at all levels of football at Colchester United. Colchester United traditionally used the same colours of their predecessors Colchester Town who played in blue and white striped shirts combined with white shorts.

== Stadium ==
Despite originally planning to host matches at their Shrub End training ground, it was announced on 12 September 2023 that their new home ground would be at Colchester Garrison, with full access to the covered seating area and clubhouse before and after matches.

== Players ==
=== First-team squad ===
For 2026/27 season

Note: Flags indicate national team as defined under FIFA eligibility rules; some limited exceptions apply. Players may hold more than one non-FIFA nationality.

| No. | Pos. | Nation | Player |
|---|---|---|---|
| 1 | GK | ENG | Izzy Eagland |
| 2 | DF | ENG | Georgia Young |
| 3 | DF | ENG | Layla Russell |
| 4 | DF | ENG | Jac Craddock-Ball |
| 5 | DF | ENG | Niamh Gamble |
| 6 | MF | ENG | Cassie Craddock-Ball (Captain) |
| 7 | MF | ENG | Aofie McGinley |
| 8 | FW | ENG | Lindsey Morgan |
| 9 | FW | ENG | Keisha Amoah |
| 10 | MF | ENG | Brooke Wright |
| 11 | FW | ENG | Emily Ager |
| 12 | MF | ENG | Belle Fermor |
| 13 | GK | ENG | Lottie Behan |
| 14 | DF | ENG | Karys Paton |
| 15 | MF | ENG | Gracie-Jayne Angus |
| 16 | DF | ENG | Bethany Mills |
| 17 | MF | ENG | Kezia Holdaway |
| 18 | FW | ENG | Lily Tilyard |
| 19 | FW | ENG | Evie-Mai Harding |
| 20 | MF | ENG | Billie-Jo Williams |
| 21 | DF | ENG | Lucy Yewman |
| 22 | FW | ENG | Tori St Rose |
| 23 | DF | ENG | Amelie Brooke |
| — | | | |

== Coaching staff ==
- Head Coach: Milly Morgan
- Assistant Coach: Tony Russell
- Assistant Coach: Dan Prior

== Honours ==
League

- Essex County Women's Football League Premier Division
  - Runners up: 2024/25 (Promotion)
- Essex County Women's Football League Division Two
  - Champions: 2023/24 (Double promotion)

Cup

- Essex Women’s Trophy
  - Winners: 2025/26
- Essex Women's League Cup
  - Winners: 2023/24

== League Positions ==
| Season | League | Position | Notes |
| 2023/24 | Essex County Women's Football League Division Two | 1st | Champions & double promotion |
| 2024/25 | Essex County Women's Football League Premier Division | 2nd | Promoted |
| 2025/26 | Eastern Region Women's Football League Divison One South | 7th | |
| 2026/27 | Eastern Region Women's Football League Divison One South | TBC | |
