= Yvonne Tracy =

Irish association footballer (born 1981)

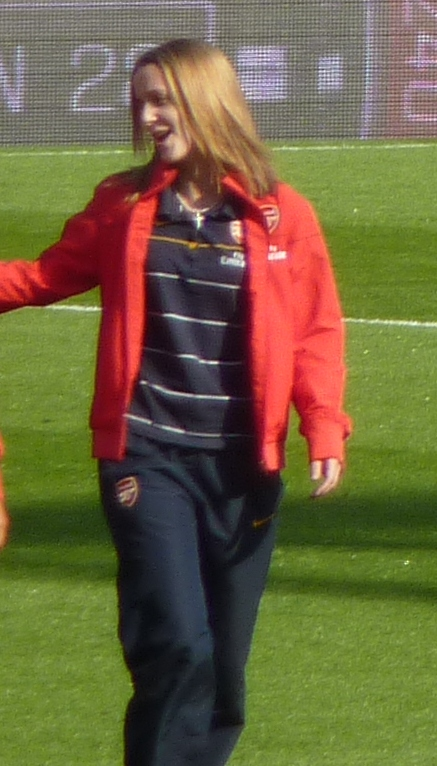

Personal information
- Date of birth: 27 February 1981 (age 45)
- Place of birth: Limerick, Ireland
- Height: 1.68 m (5 ft 6 in)
- Position: Defender

Senior career*
Years	Team	Apps	(Gls)
- Lifford
- St Patrick's Athletic Ladies
2000–2014	Arsenal		

International career
- Republic of Ireland
- * Club domestic league appearances and goals

Yvonne Tracy (born 27 February 1981) is an Irish female international football defender. She is a well known player at the club and international level, competing in youth cups beginning at age 16.

== Club career ==
Tracy began her career with Lifford in County Clare. She joined Arsenal Ladies in August 2000 with compatriots Susan Heapes and Caroline Thorpe, and at the same time as Jayne Ludlow. One of seven Irish players then in the Arsenal squad, Tracy was employed in the club's laundry. She won the domestic treble in her first season, and was an unused substitute as Arsenal beat Fulham in the 2001 FA Women's Cup final.

During a league match in 2006 Tracy suffered an anterior cruciate ligament injury which kept her out of action for over a year. Republic of Ireland manager Noel King praised Tracy's "incredible spirit" in coming back. However, an injury to the same knee curtailed her appearances in season 2008–09.

Tracy left Arsenal in February 2014.

== International career ==
Tracy began playing for the national U16 and U18 teams in 1997, alongside Lifford Ladies teammates Aoife Healy and Áine Greene. While still playing for Lifford, Tracy impressed as captain of the Irish U18 team who topped their qualifying group in 1999. Her performances earned her a starting place in the senior team for a match against Croatia, though she had already featured against the Czech Republic in a 1–1 away draw. After becoming a regular at full international level Tracy was nominated for the International Player of the Year in 2000.

Tracy has since won over 40 senior caps for Ireland and was Irish International Player of the Year in 2002. In October 2009 she came on as a substitute for the injured Stef Curtis and scored the winner in Kazakhstan in a 2011 FIFA Women's World Cup qualification - UEFA Group 6 game. Tracy said: "It has been a long, long road to recovery, but it is exciting to return to the pitch and a match-winning goal is a fantastic boost."
