= Alex Scott (footballer, born 1984) =

English footballer and sports commentator (born 1984)

Alex Scott MBE
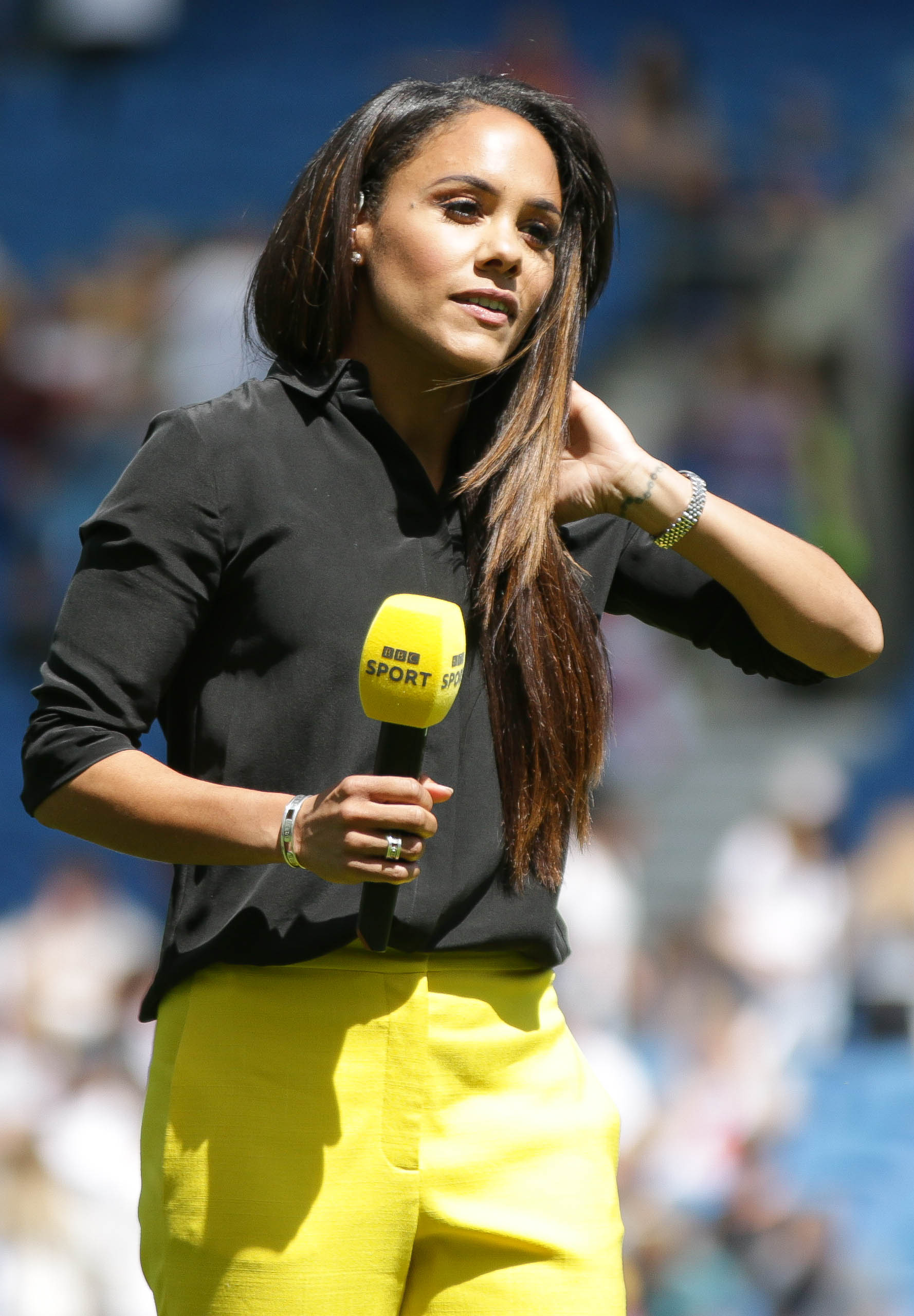
- Scott in 2019

Personal information
- Full name: Alexandra Virina Scott
- Date of birth: 14 October 1984 (age 42)
- Place of birth: London, England
- Height: 5 ft 4 in (1.63 m)
- Position: Right-back

Youth career
- 1992–1999: Arsenal

Senior career*
Years	Team	Apps	(Gls)
2002–2004	Arsenal		
2004–2005	Birmingham City	15	(2)
2005–2009	Arsenal	72	(6)
2009–2011	Boston Breakers	55	(1)
2012–2018	Arsenal	76	(6)
Total		218	(15)

International career
2004–2017	England	140	(12)
2012	Great Britain	5	(0)
Medal record
Women's football
Representing England
FIFA Women's World Cup
Third place	2015 Canada
UEFA Women's Championship
Runner-up	2009 Finland
- * Club domestic league appearances and goals

Alexandra Virina Scott MBE (born 14 October 1984) is an English sports presenter, pundit and former professional footballer who played as a right-back. She has been the presenter for the British Broadcasting Corporation (BBC) since her retirement.

At club level, Scott has had three separate spells with Arsenal, punctuated with a season at Birmingham City in the 2004–05 season and three years in the American Women's Professional Soccer (WPS) with the Boston Breakers. She scored the winning goal for Arsenal in the 2007 UEFA Women's Cup final. At international level, she made 140 appearances for the England national team and represented Great Britain at the 2012 Summer Olympics. Scott was inducted to the English Football Hall of Fame in 2019, and was inducted to the WSL Hall of Fame in 2024.

After retirement, Scott went into punditry, simultaneously working for BBC Sport and Sky Sports. In this role, she covered the 2018 FIFA World Cup and 2019 FIFA Women's World Cup. Scott also began co-presenting shows such as The One Show and Goals on Sunday, before primarily working for the BBC, where she became co-host of the annual Sports Personality of the Year ceremony and presented coverage of the Summer Olympics. In 2021, she was named the main presenter of Football Focus, succeeding Dan Walker, and becoming the show's final presenter until its closure in May 2026.

== Early life ==
Alexandra Virina Scott was born on 14 October 1984 in Poplar, London, to an English mother and a Jamaican father. Her maternal grandfather came to England from Northern Ireland, and her maternal grandmother was of Lithuanian-Jewish heritage. During the filming of the BBC's Who Do You Think You Are? in 2021, she discovered that her Jewish maternal great-grandfather had opposed fascism in East London, taking part in the Battle of Cable Street, and that her four times great-grandfather was a black man who owned twenty-six slaves.

Scott attended Langdon Park School which has been granted Sports College status.

In 2022, Scott revealed in her autobiography that she had been a victim of domestic abuse from her father during her childhood; she pledged that all proceeds from her book would go to help women affected by similar abuse.

== Club career ==
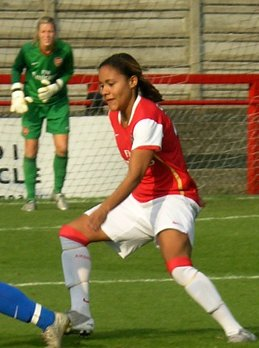
Scott playing for Arsenal in 2006, with Emma Byrne looking on

=== Start in England ===
Scott signed on with Arsenal in 1992, at the age of eight. After breaking into the first team as a striker or right winger, she was later converted to full-back. Scott remained with Arsenal until the 2004–05 season, after which she moved to Birmingham City. With the addition of Scott, the club finished fourth in the FA Women's Premier League National Division. However, due to Birmingham's financial difficulties, she returned to Arsenal for the 2005–06 season.

Upon rejoining Arsenal, Scott helped the club to a domestic double of the FA Women's Premier League and FA Women's Cup. She was also a key figure in Arsenal's historic "Quadruple" season in which they won all of their trophy competitions, including the 2006–07 UEFA Women's Cup. Arsenal were the first ever British side to win the competition, with Scott scoring the only goal in the two-legged tie with Umeå IK. She appeared in 22 Premier League games, scoring two goals. In all competitions, she made 40 appearances and scored four goals.

The 2007–08 season saw Scott appear in 21 games, scoring once. In all competitions, she made 35 appearances, scoring three goals. In the 2008–09 season, Scott scored once in 13 games. In all competitions, she made 24 appearances, adding two goals.

=== Move to the United States ===
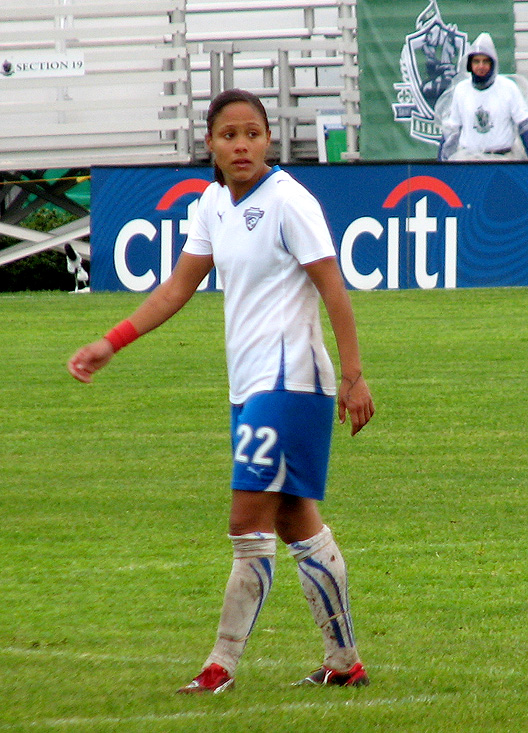
Scott playing for the Boston Breakers in the WPS in 2010

Upon the creation of a new women's league in the United States, Women's Professional Soccer, it was announced on 25 September 2008 that her WPS playing rights had been assigned to the Chicago Red Stars, whose head coach was former Arsenal assistant Emma Hayes. Her rights were traded on 15 January 2009 to the Boston Breakers and it was announced on 6 February 2009 that she would be leaving Arsenal to join up with her new team.

In the inaugural 2009 Women's Professional Soccer season, Scott played in 17 games for the Breakers. She scored one goal and added one assist. In 2010, Scott featured in 21 games and registered two assists. She started 14 of her 15 matches in 2011. In December 2011, Scott returned to Arsenal on loan for the duration of a three-match pre-season tour of Japan.

=== Back to England ===
When the WPS collapsed ahead of the 2012 campaign, Scott returned for a third spell at Arsenal. She was joined by Boston Breakers teammate Kelly Smith. Scott was named captain for the 2014–15 season. She did not take part in the 2015 FA WSL Cup final, where Arsenal beat Notts County. In the following season, Scott helped take Arsenal to the 2016 FA Women's Cup final against Chelsea, which the Gunners won 1–0. Scott played her last game on 12 May 2018 against Manchester City, which Arsenal won 2–1.

== International career ==
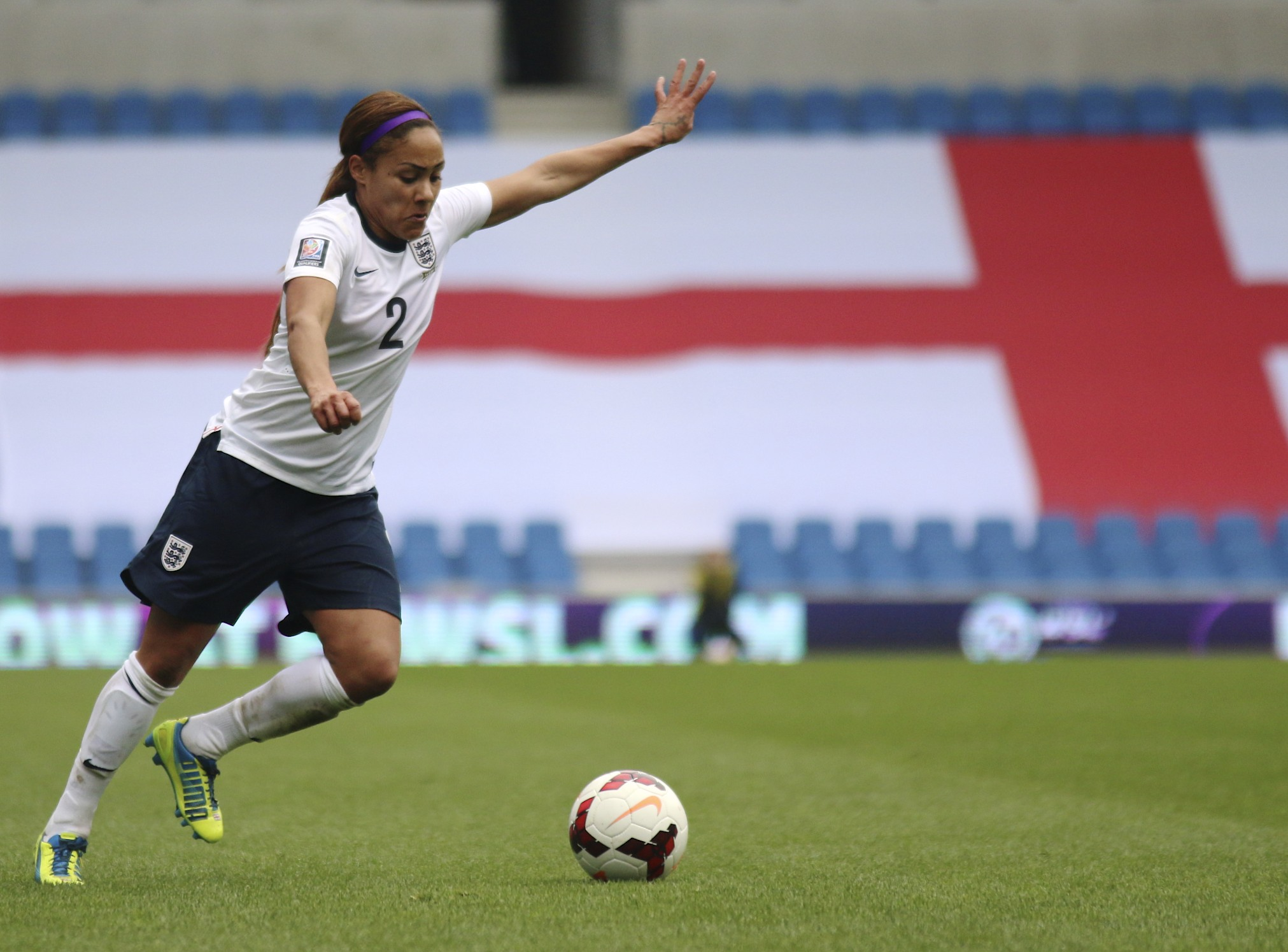
Scott playing for England in 2014

=== England ===
Scott competed at the U19 and U21 levels for England, including at the 2002 FIFA U-19 Women's World Championship in Canada.

Scott made her full debut against the Netherlands on 18 September 2004. She played in the 2005, 2009, 2013 and 2017 editions of the UEFA Women's Championship, as well as the 2007, 2011 and 2015 FIFA Women's World Cups. She won silver at the 2009 UEFA Women's Euros and bronze at the 2015 FIFA Women's World Cup.

In November 2014, Scott headed powerfully past her own goalkeeper to give Germany the lead in England's crushing 3–0 defeat at Wembley Stadium.

On 2 September 2017, Scott retired from international football. On the date of retirement, she ended up as the second most capped England player with 140 appearances.

Scott was allotted 155 when the FA announced their legacy numbers scheme to honour the 50th anniversary of England's inaugural international.

=== Great Britain ===
In June 2012, Scott was named in the 18-player Great Britain squad for the 2012 Summer Olympics, where the British team finished 5th.

== Media career ==
Scott began her media career while still playing football, appearing on programmes such as Soccer AM, with other minor roles at BBC Sport, BT Sport, and Sky Sports. She wrote a weekly women's football column in the Morning Star newspaper, and a column in The Independent during the 2014 FIFA World Cup.

In 2016, she appeared in Bear Grylls' ITV show, Mission Survive, which she won.

Following her retirement in 2017, Scott turned her focus full-time to television broadcasting, co-presenting on Match of the Day Kickabout. She became well known to a wider audience when she covered the 2018 FIFA World Cup, becoming the first female football pundit at a World Cup for the BBC. After the tournament, she continued to provide insight on the Premier League, and in August 2018, became the first female pundit on Sky Sports, joining the Super Sunday team. She covered the 2019 FIFA Women's World Cup for the BBC. In August 2019, Scott was announced as the new co-host of Sky Sports' Goals on Sunday, alongside Chris Kamara. Since 2020, Scott has been a regular co-host on the annual BBC Sports Personality of the Year ceremony. Scott is also a relief guest presenter on The One Show.

In September 2019, Scott was a contestant on the 17th series of Strictly Come Dancing, paired with professional dancer Neil Jones. She was the first woman footballer to take part in the show. The couple were eliminated in week 11, coming fifth.

Week No.	Dance/Song	Judges' score				Total	Result
Week No.	Dance/Song	Horwood	Mabuse	Ballas	Tonioli	Total	Result
1	Quickstep/ "I Get a Kick Out of You"	5	5	5	6	21	No Elimination
2	Cha cha cha / "What I Did for Love"	4	6	6	6	22	Safe
3	Rumba/ "How Far I'll Go"	5	6	6	6	23	Safe
4	Tango/ "Go Your Own Way"	4	6	6	7	23 (Note: Red number indicates Alex and Neil were at the bottom of the leaderboard)	Safe
5	Charleston / "Pump Up the Jam"	8	8	8	9 (Note: Score awarded by guest judge Alfonso Ribeiro)	33	Safe
6	Street / "Ghostbusters" (Note: Neil was injured during week 6 rehearsals, so Kevin Clifton danced in his place)	7	9	9	9	34	Safe
7	American Smooth / "Ain't No Mountain High Enough"	7	8	8	8	31	Safe
8	Jive / "Let's Twist Again"	7	8	8	8	31	Safe
9	Paso Doble / "Run the World (Girls)"	8	8	9	9	34	Safe
10	Argentine Tango / "Never Tear Us Apart"	4	7	7	8	26	Safe
11	Samba / "Joyful Joyful"	6	7	7	7	27	Eliminated

Scott has spoken out repeatedly about the sexist abuse she frequently receives on social media because of her role as a football pundit.

In May 2021, Scott was announced as the new presenter of Football Focus, after Dan Walker's decision to step down. In July 2021, Scott was announced as the host of a new BBC daytime quiz show, The Tournament, which began airing in November. That same month (July), Scott was announced as a commentator for the EA Sports game FIFA 22. She was a main presenter for the BBC's coverage of the 2020 Summer Olympics, alongside Clare Balding, presenting coverage of the opening and closing ceremonies and a nightly highlights show.

Scott participated in the eighteenth series of the ancestry research programme Who Do You Think You Are?; her episode aired on 26 October 2021.

Shortly after seven European national football associations announced that they were asking their captains not to wear the pro-LGBTQ+ OneLove armband at the 2022 FIFA World Cup, due to a threat of sporting sanctions from FIFA, Scott wore the armband while reporting on the England–Iran match on 21 November.

On 10 March 2023, following the suspension of Gary Lineker as the host of Match of the Day for allegedly breaching BBC impartiality rules by criticising the government's asylum policy on Twitter, Scott sent a Bernie Sanders meme titled "nah not me" to indicate she would not present the following episode of the show in solidarity with Lineker.

In June 2023, Scott was featured in the national ad for messaging platform WhatsApp. In the campaign titled A Private Message, Scott starred opposite Ted Lasso actor Karen Johal. WhatsApp used Scott to help promote their new secure messaging services.

In November 2025, it was confirmed that Scott would be participating in series 25 of I'm a Celebrity...Get Me Out of Here!. On 28 November, she was the first celebrity to be eliminated from the jungle.

== Personal life ==
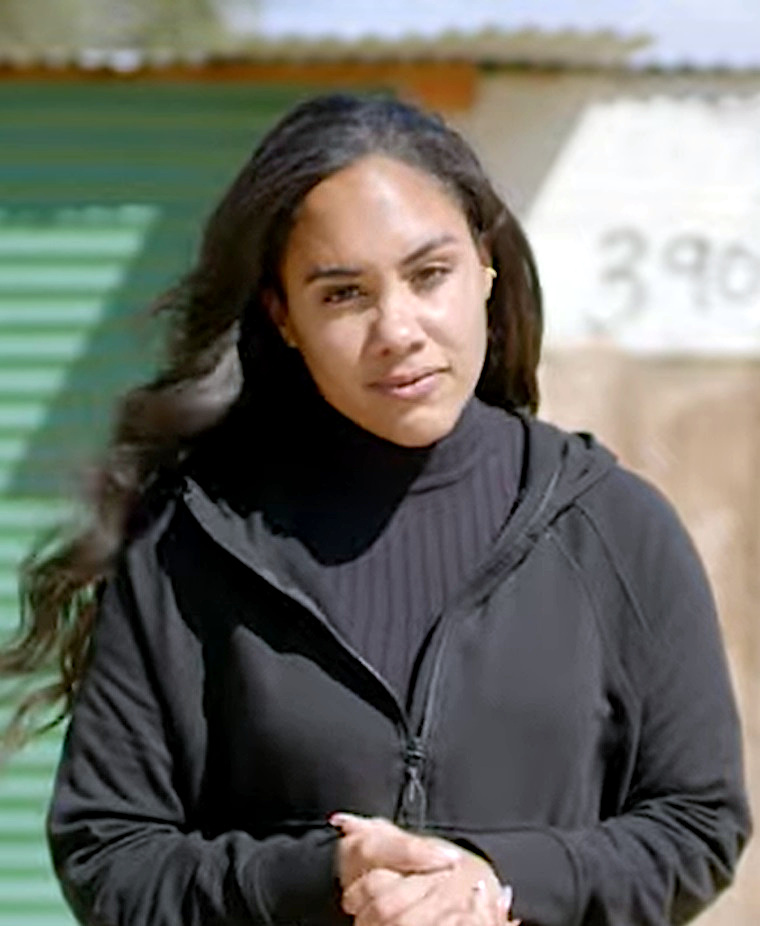
Scott at Soccer Aid for UNICEF, 2024

In 2011, Scott founded the Alex Scott Academy in partnership with Kingston College and Puma, for female footballers aged 16–19 years. This represented the first such academy in the UK and was intended to highlight the growth of the women's game.

While playing for Arsenal, Scott completed a degree in Professional Sports Writing and Broadcasting at Staffordshire University. She received an honorary doctorate from the University of Hertfordshire in 2021, and an honorary fellowship from the Queen Mary University of London.

Scott was appointed Member of the Order of the British Empire (MBE) in the 2017 New Year Honours for services to football, she invited her mother, grandmother and niece to her investiture at Buckingham Palace and surprised her family with afternoon tea at The Ritz. Her memoir How (Not) To Be Strong was published on 29 September 2022.

Scott and former partner and teammate Kelly Smith shared a house in Hertfordshire. The pair were teammates in America while both played for the Boston Breakers. Both returned to England to play for Arsenal together in 2012, after the collapse of their American league. In her memoir, Scott confirmed that she and Smith were a couple from 2005 to 2013. While she says she fell "madly and deeply in love" with Smith, Scott has not explicitly labelled her sexuality and has said she has been in relationships with both men and women. Scott has been in a relationship with singer Jess Glynne since the summer of 2023.

== Career statistics ==
=== International ===
Scores and results list England's goal tally first, score column indicates score after each Scott goal.

List of international goals scored by Alex Scott
No.	Date	Venue	Opponent	Score	Result	Competition
1	27 October 2005	Tapolca Stadium, Tapolca, Hungary	Hungary	4–0	13–0	2007 FIFA World Cup qualification
2	27 October 2005	Tapolca Stadium, Tapolca, Hungary	Hungary	6–0	13–0	2007 FIFA World Cup qualification
3	11 May 2006	St. Mary's, Southampton, England	Hungary	2–0	2–0	2007 FIFA World Cup qualification
4	25 October 2006	Waldstadion, Ahlen, Germany	Germany	1–0	1–5	Friendly
5	8 March 2007	National Hockey Stadium, Milton Keynes, England	Russia	1–0	6–0	Friendly
6	28 January 2007	Guangdong Olympic Stadium, Guangzhou, China	United States	1–1	1–1	2007 Four Nations Tournament
7	27 October 2007	Bescot Stadium, Walsall, England	Belarus	1–0	4–0	2009 UEFA Championship qualification
8	27 October 2007	Bescot Stadium, Walsall, England	Belarus	4–0	4–0	2009 UEFA Championship qualification
9	26 November 2009	Buca Arena, İzmir, Turkey	Turkey	1–0	3–0	2011 FIFA World Cup qualification
10	1 March 2010	GSP Stadium, Nicosia, Cyprus	Italy	1–0	3–2	2010 Cyprus Cup
11	1 March 2010	GSP Stadium, Nicosia, Cyprus	Italy	2–0	3–2	2010 Cyprus Cup
12	21 August 2010	Sepp-Doll-Stadion, Krems, Austria	Austria	3–0	4–0	2011 FIFA World Cup qualification

== Honours ==
Arsenal

- FA WSL: 2012
- FA WSL Cup: 2012, 2013, 2015, 2018
- FA Women's Premier League: 2003–04, 2005–06, 2006–07, 2007–08, 2008–09
- FA Cup: 2003–04, 2005–06, 2006–07, 2007–08, 2012–13, 2013–14, 2015–16
- FA Women's Premier League Cup: 2006–07, 2008–09
- Women's FA Community Shield: 2006, 2008
- UEFA Women's Cup: 2006–07

England

- FIFA Women's World Cup third place: 2015
- UEFA Women's Championship runner-up: 2009
- Cyprus Cup: 2009, 2013, 2015

Individual

- Women's Super League Hall of Fame: 2024

Orders and special awards

- 2017: Member of the Order of the British Empire (MBE) 2017 New Year Honours
- 2023: The Sport Award

== See also ==
- List of England women's international footballers
- List of football personalities with British honours
- List of Strictly Come Dancing contestants
- List of women's footballers with 100 or more international caps
