= Danielle Bird =

English footballer (born 1987)

Personal information
- Date of birth: 22 February 1987 (age 39)
- Position: Midfielder

Senior career*
Years	Team	Apps	(Gls)
- Fulham
- Arsenal
- Chelsea
- * Club domestic league appearances and goals

Danielle Bird (born 22 February 1987) is an English retired footballer who played as a midfielder for Arsenal, Chelsea and Fulham.

== International career ==
Bird represented the England at youth level.
