= Saša Ihringová =

Slovak football referee (born 1975)

- Full name: Alexandra Ihringová
- Born: 29 January 1975 (age 51); Czechoslovakia

International
- Years: League
- 2001–: FIFA

Alexandra "Saša" Ihringová (born 29 January 1975) is a Slovak-born football referee, based in Shropshire, who officiates in the role of assistant referee in the Football League.

In addition she has refereed several major women's football matches at domestic and international level. These include the FA Women's Cup final, the UEFA Women's Champions League final, the UEFA Women's Championship final and the FIFA U-20 Women's World Cup final.

Ihringová is 5 ft 9 in (1.75 m) tall and, as well as her native Slovak, can speak English, German, Russian and Spanish.

== Career ==
=== Early career ===
"I am always happy to admit that if I was a good player, I would still be playing! It is indefinitely more fun."

— Ihringová on her playing days

Ihringová grew up in a sporting family in Bratislava. As a player, Ihringová was a national champion three times from 1991 to 1994 with her club Filozof Bratislava. She attended a course for women officials in 1995. Her move into refereeing was inspired by Ihringová's uncle, Karol Ihring, a FIFA official named the best referee in Slovakia three times.

Ihringová quickly progressed through the ranks and in 2002 became the first, and at the time, only, woman to referee in the second tier of men's football in Slovakia.

=== England ===
In 2006 Ihringová emigrated to England, and was "adopted" by the Football Association. She oversaw two consecutive FA Women's Cup finals in 2008 and 2009. Ihringová considered that the move to England, and particularly her involvement at Football League level, assisted in her overall development as a referee.

Ihringová took charge of the second–leg of the 2008 UEFA Women's Cup Final between 1. FFC Frankfurt and Umeå IK, before 27,000 spectators at Commerzbank-Arena.

In April 2011 she refereed the first game of the new FA WSL, as Arsenal beat Chelsea 1–0.

=== International career ===
Ihringová was appointed to the FIFA list in 2001 and took charge of her first women's international, a World Cup qualifier between Germany and Spain, in October of that year. She also participated at the 2002 edition of the UEFA Women's Under-19 Championship in Sweden. At the 2004 FIFA U-19 Women's World Championship, Ihringová was awarded the semi–final between Brazil and China.

In June 2005 Ihringová was selected to referee the final of UEFA Women's Euro 2005, as Germany defeated Norway at Ewood Park. After switching her allegiance to England, Ihringová refereed the United States' victory over North Korea at Estadio Bicentenario de La Florida, in the final of the 2008 FIFA U-20 Women's World Cup.

== See also ==
- List of football referees
- Amy Rayner, first female Football League referee
- Wendy Toms, first female Football League and Premier League assistant referee

Preceded by (Switzerland) Nicole Petignat	2005 UEFA Women's Euro Final (Slovakia) Saša Ihringová	Succeeded by (Czech Republic) Dagmar Damková
