= Suzanne Grant =

Scottish footballer (born 1984)

Suzanne Winters
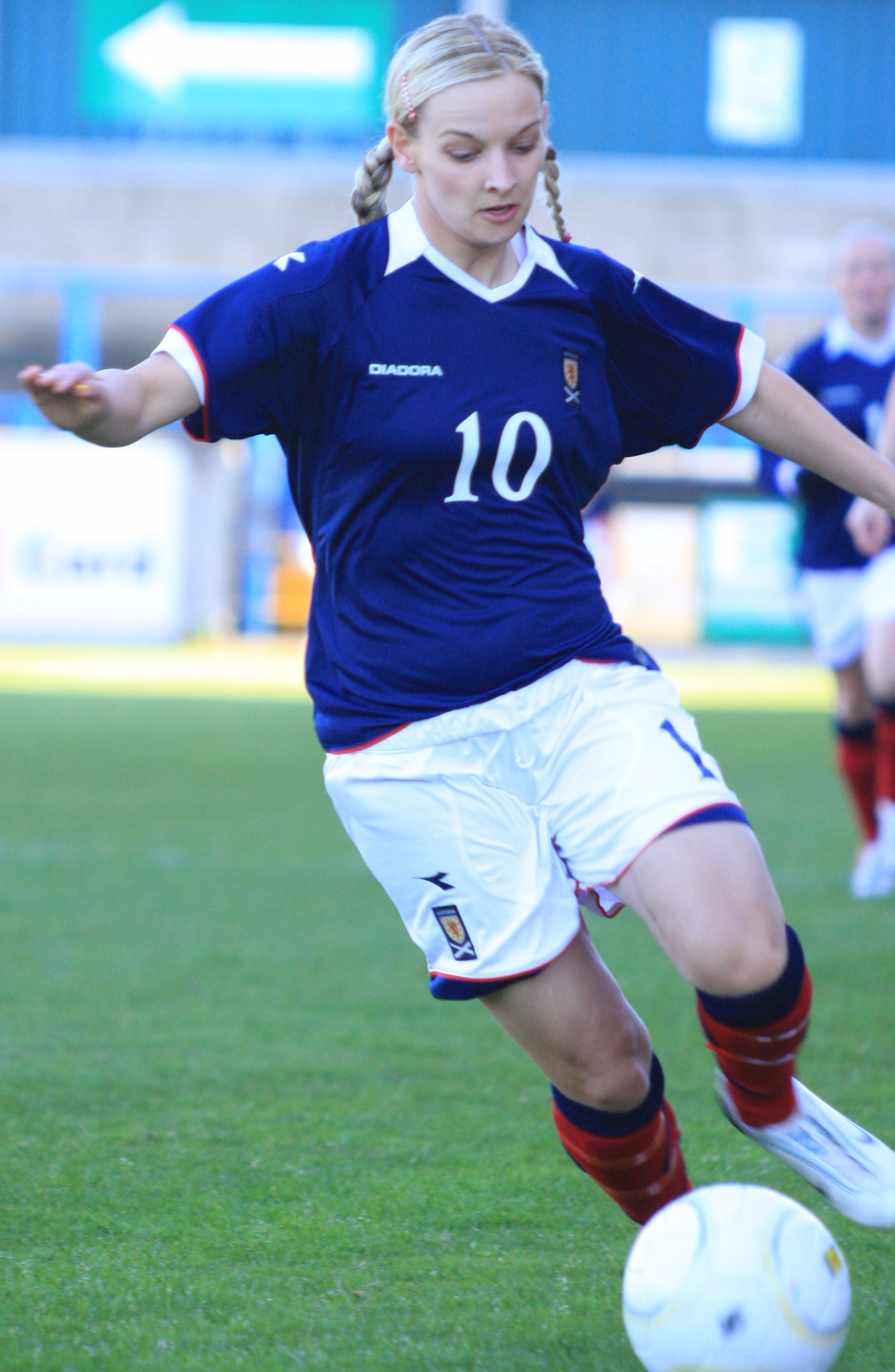
- Suzanne Grant in May 2009

Personal information
- Date of birth: 17 April 1984 (age 42)
- Place of birth: Inverness, Scotland
- Position: Forward

Senior career*
Years	Team	Apps	(Gls)
2004–2006	Glasgow City		
2006–2009	Hibernian		
2009	Arsenal	8	(3)
2009–2015	Celtic		
2010	→ Keynsham Town (loan)		
2011–2012	→ Keynsham Town (loan)		
2015–2017	Motherwell		

International career
2000–2013	Scotland	105	(13)
- * Club domestic league appearances and goals

Suzanne Winters (née Grant) (born 17 April 1984) is a former Scottish footballer, who played as striker. She made 105 appearances for the Scotland national team between 2000 and 2013, making her international debut aged 16 despite not playing for a senior women's team. Her twin sister, Shelley Grant, has also played for Scotland.

Grant played in the Scottish Women's Premier League (SWPL) for Glasgow City, Hibernian, Celtic and Motherwell and in the FA Women's Premier League (FA WPL) for Arsenal and Keynsham Town. She won domestic trebles with both Hibernian and Arsenal, and scored eleven goals on her debut for Motherwell. She retired from playing in 2017.

== Club career ==
=== Early career ===
During her youth career, Grant played for Ross County and Inverness Caledonian Thistle. She also enjoyed a spell with Glasgow City, which included a Scottish Women's Cup Final hat-trick in 2006, as Glasgow City disposed of Aberdeen 5–1. Shortly afterwards, she joined Hibernian Ladies in 2006, and in 2007 won the domestic treble of the SWPL title, the Scottish Women's Cup (and again in 2008) and the SWPL Cup with the club.

=== Arsenal (2009) ===
Grant left Hibernian Ladies to join Arsenal Ladies on 20 February 2009. Highlights of her time with Arsenal included; scoring on her debut six days after signing, as a substitute in the FA Women's Premier League Cup Final victory. She also played in the FA Women's Cup winning side and in May 2009 she scored the only goal of the game against Everton Ladies that clinched the Premier League title for Arsenal. Grant described it as "the best week of my life.".

On as a 77th-minute substitute in the 2009 FA Women's Premier League Cup Final, Grant scored on what was her debut, in a 5–0 win over Doncaster Rovers Belles on 26 February 2009. She scored with a penalty, on her Premier League debut, in a 5–0 win at Fulham on 19 March 2009. Grant made her first start one week later, in a 1–0 league win at Watford. Her next goal, came from the penalty spot again, in a 3–0 home league win against Bristol Academy on 5 April 2009. She played the first 62 minutes in the 2009 FA Women's Cup Final, in a 2–1 defeat of Sunderland on 4 May 2009. Grant also played in the semi-final win against Everton. In her last match for Arsenal, Grant scored the decisive goal in the final league match of the season, in a 1–0 win at Everton to secure the Premier League title and the domestic treble for Arsenal. Grant had made four other league appearances during the season. She also won the London FA Women's County Cup with Arsenal, netting twice in both the semi-final and the Final. Grant finished her time at Arsenal, with four goals from 11 appearances in all competitions, but not including County Cup matches.

=== Return to Scotland and loans (2009–2017) ===
Having had to commute to London from Glasgow for each of Arsenal's games, Grant joined Celtic Ladies in the 2009 close season and scored over 100 goals for Celtic wearing the number 99 shirt. She won the 2010 SWPL Cup with Celtic, as they beat Spartans 4–0 in the Final at Ainslie Park. As well as assisting the fourth goal in the Final, Grant scored a hat-trick in the semi-finals.

Grant signed for Keynsham Town Ladies for extra games when the Scottish season ended. In December 2010 she put her own football career on hold to join fiancé David Winters in Vietnam, where Winters was playing for a second division Vietnamese club. She then travelled to the 2011 Cyprus Cup with Scotland and was back with Celtic for the new Scottish season, being named as an unused substitute (due to injury) for The Hoops' 8–0 humbling by rivals Glasgow City on 13 March 2011.

At the end of the Scottish season Grant returned to Keynsham Town, scoring in an FA Women's Premier League Cup defeat to Reading and twice in an FA Women's Cup victory over Gillingham. Grant was back at Celtic in time for the start of the new Scottish season.

On 10 July 2015, Grant signed for ambitious SWFL Second Division side Motherwell, saying: "I am very happy to be at Motherwell FC, who are extremely ambitious, and I am looking forward to be back playing and hopefully help the club achieve its aim of progressing to the top league and winning trophies." She scored 11 goals on her début in a 21–0 win against Edinburgh South on 2 August 2015, also providing numerous assists. Her performance prompted Sky News to wonder if she had made the "best début in history".

She retired from professional football in November 2017, as a result of a knee injury sustained playing for Motherwell against Hearts the previous month.

== International career ==
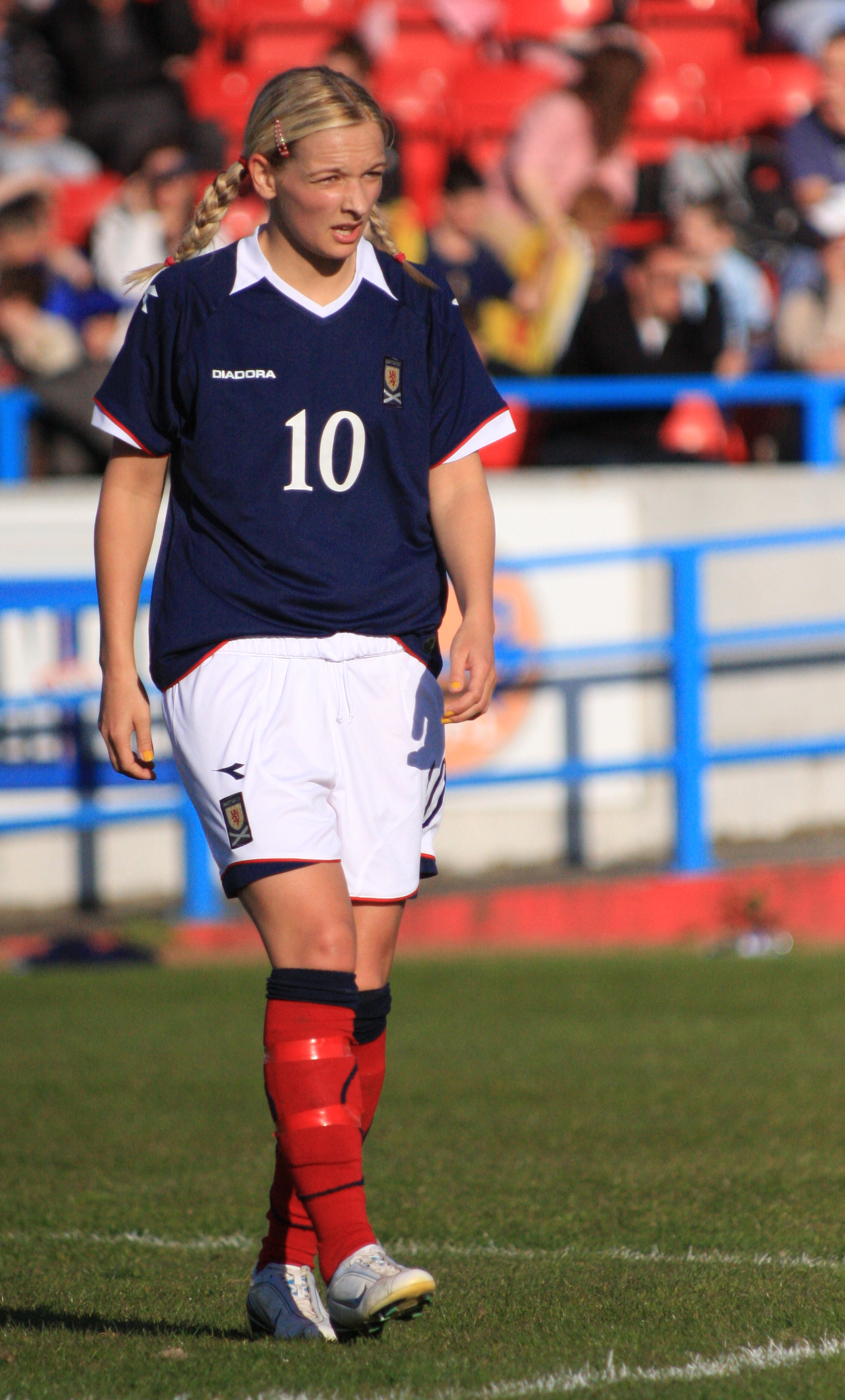

Grant made her senior Scotland debut as a 16-year-old, scoring twice against Northern Ireland. She had been called up for the national side despite not playing for an organised women's team at the time, just her school and a local boys' club. Grant won her 50th cap for the senior side in April 2008, playing in the game against Belgium.

Although primarily a forward, Grant played much of her football for Scotland in midfield. Her 75th international appearance came against Bulgaria in April 2010.

In December 2011 Grant was among four Celtic women's team players to be approached about playing for Team GB at the 2012 Olympics.

Grant earned her 100th cap against the United States in February 2013. In June 2013 it was announced that Grant was pregnant with her first child and would not play again for the remainder of the year.

=== International goals ===
Grant's goal against Portugal in 2004 is not included in her official SFA profile.

Scores and results list Scotland's goal tally first.

#	Date	Venue	Opponent	Result	Competition	Scored
2	29 November 2000	David Keswick Centre, Dumfries	Northern Ireland	?–?	Friendly	2
3	23 May 2004	Almondvale Stadium, Livingston	Portugal	2–1	2005 UEFA Women's Championship Qual.	1
4	5 March 2008	Paralimni Stadium, Cyprus	United States	1–2	Cyprus Cup	1
5	28 September 2008	McDiarmid Park, Perth	Slovakia	6–0	2009 UEFA Women's Championship Qual.	1
6	12 March 2009	GSP Stadium, Nicosia	Russia	2–1	2009 Cyprus Cup	1
7	15 October 2009	The Oval, Belfast	Northern Ireland	3–0	Friendly	1
9	26 October 2009	Tynecastle Stadium, Edinburgh	Georgia	3–1	2011 FIFA Women's World Cup qual.	2
10	24 February 2010	GSP Stadium, Nicosia	Netherlands	1–4	2010 Cyprus Cup	1
11	1 April 2010	Falkirk Stadium, Falkirk	Bulgaria	8–1	2011 FIFA Women's World Cup qual.	1
12	21 August 2010	Strathclyde Homes Stadium, Dumbarton	Greece	4–1	2011 FIFA Women's World Cup qual.	1
13	13 February 2013	LP Field, Nashville	United States	1–3	Friendly	1

== Honours ==
Glasgow City

- Scottish Women's Cup: 2005–06

Hibernian

- Scottish Women's Premier League: 2006–07
- Scottish Women's Cup: 2006–07, 2007–08
- Scottish Women's Premier League Cup: 2006–07

Arsenal

- FA Women's Premier League National Division: 2008–09
- FA Women's Cup: 2008–09
- FA Women's Premier League Cup: 2008–09
- London FA Women's County Cup: 2009

Celtic

- Scottish Women's Premier League Cup: 2010

== Personal life ==
Grant grew up in Grantown-on-Spey, in the Scottish Highlands. She has a twin sister, Shelley, who also previously played for Glasgow City and Scotland. Both twins were awarded the Freedom of Grantown in 2016. Shelley is married to Scotland international footballer Don Cowie.

Grant has been in a relationship with professional footballer David Winters since 2003 and lives with him in East Kilbride. They had their first child, a son called Oscar, in November 2013 and second son Theo in June 2018. Grant trained throughout her pregnancy and returned to playing within five weeks of giving birth. Grant and Winters married in 2017, shortly before her retirement from playing; she now uses her married name.

== See also ==
- List of women's footballers with 100 or more caps
- Scottish FA Women's International Roll of Honour
