= Gemma Davison =

English footballer

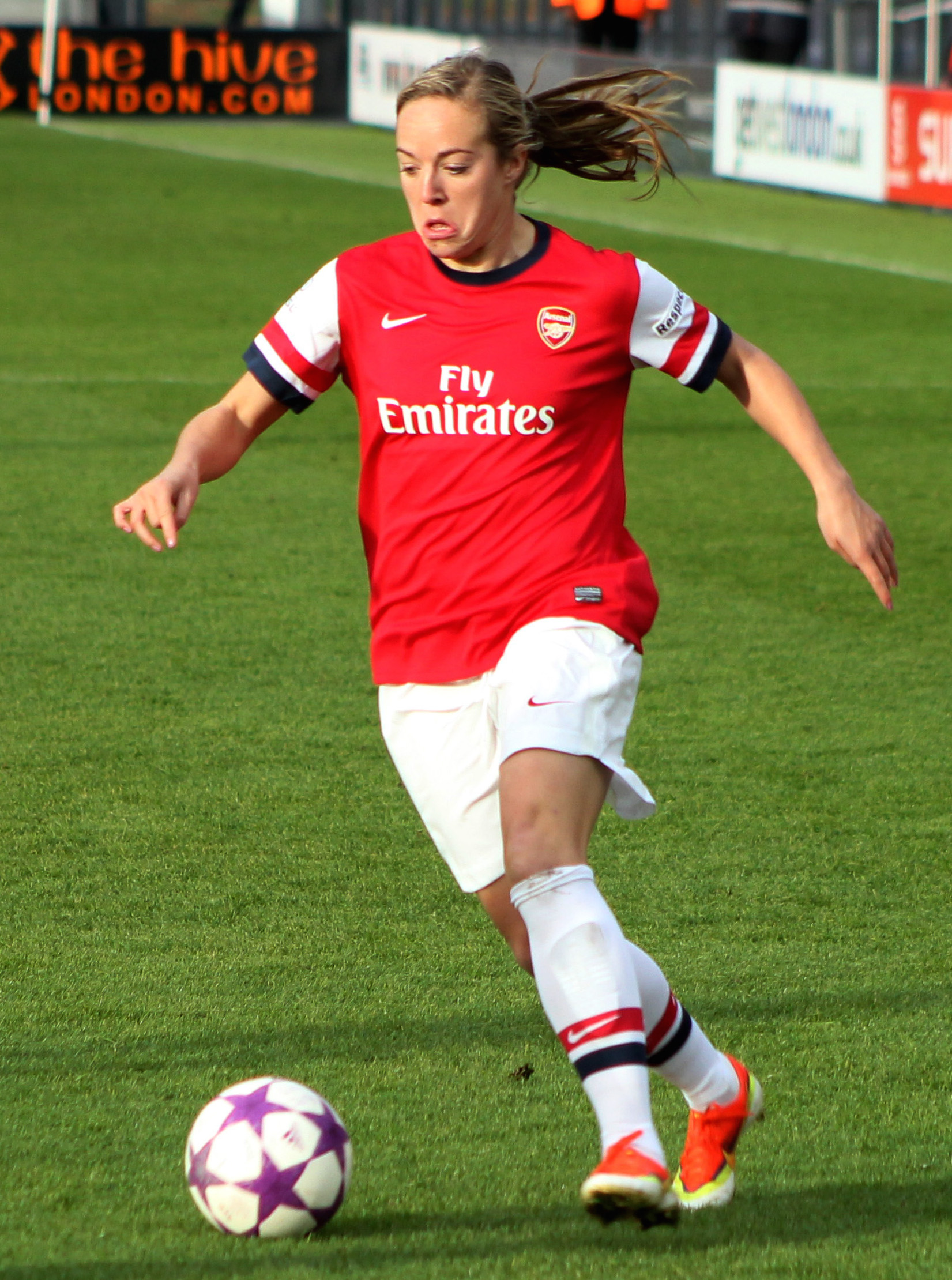
- Davison playing for Arsenal in 2013

Personal information
- Full name: Gemma Suzanne Davison
- Date of birth: 17 April 1987 (age 39)
- Place of birth: Barnet, England
- Height: 5 ft 6 in (1.68 m)
- Position: Forward

Youth career
- Watford
- 2001–2005: Arsenal

Senior career*
Years	Team	Apps	(Gls)
2005–2008	Arsenal		
2008	New York Magic		
2008–2009	Arsenal	22	(7)
2009	Chicago Red Eleven		
2009–2010	Arsenal	22	(12)
2010	Buffalo Flash	5	(1)
2011	Western New York Flash	12	(1)
2012	Sky Blue FC	0	(0)
2012–2013	Arsenal	28	(4)
2013–2014	Liverpool	14	(4)
2015–2018	Chelsea	49	(11)
2018–2019	Reading	13	(2)
2019–2021	Tottenham Hotspur	28	(1)
2021–2022	Aston Villa	3	(0)
2022–2025	Watford	17+	(1+)

International career
2013	England U23	1	(0)
2009–2017	England	17	(2)

Managerial career
- 2023–: Chelsea (assistant)
- * Club domestic league appearances and goals as of 2 May 2022

Gemma Suzanne Davison (born 17 April 1987) is an English professional football coach and former forward, currently serving as a coach for Chelsea F.C. Women. She has previously played for Aston Villa, Tottenham Hotspur and Reading whom she joined from Chelsea in 2018. After joining Arsenal at youth team level from Watford Ladies, Davison became a regular player and won several trophies. She also spent time in the United States playing for various American clubs in three separate spells. Davison is a full senior international player for the England women's national football team.

== Club career ==
Davison began her career with Watford Ladies before joining the youth set up at Arsenal Ladies. She progressed through the youth system to establish herself as regular in the Arsenal Squad. She spent the summer of 2008 playing in the United States for New York Magic, before returning to Arsenal and playing every game of the 2008–09 season, scoring seven times. In 2009, she signed for Chicago Red Eleven for their inaugural season.

=== Buffalo Flash 2010–11 ===
In 2010 Davison joined Chelsea Ladies pair Eartha Pond and Ann-Marie Heatherson at professional USL W-League club Buffalo Flash. 23 year old Davison was part of the Buffalo Flash squad that won the 2010 USL W-League Championship. Having played just five games in 2010 she proved influential in the final, scoring a goal in Buffalo's 3–1 win over the Vancouver Whitecaps. In January 2011, after the Flash joined the WPS and renamed themselves Western New York Flash, Davison left Arsenal to re-sign for the club. In 2011, she registered one goal and two assists in 12 appearances helping Western New York Flash to a championship title.

=== Sky Blue FC 2012 ===
Davison signed for Sky Blue FC in time for the 2012 season. Before she could play for her new club, the WPS was suspended. She returns to Arsenal Ladies for a fourth spell, having first joined the club's Centre of Excellence as a teenager.

=== Arsenal 2012–13 ===
Davison rejoined Arsenal in March 2012 along with new signings Kelly Smith and Alex Scott. She joined an Arsenal team that had won the treble the previous season. In 2012 Arsenal retained the FA WSL 1 league title. The 2013 season saw Davison play a key role in win the FA Women's Cup and the FA WSL Cup whilst finishing third in the league. The 2013 season saw Davison selected for the PFA WSL Team of the Year along with fellow Arsenal teammates Jordan Nobbs and Danielle Carter.

=== Liverpool 2013–14 ===
On 17 December 2013 Davison signed with current WSL 1 champions Liverpool Ladies. Davison played 14 times and scored 4 goals helping Liverpool to retain the WSL 1 title in 2014.

=== Chelsea 2015–18 ===
Davison signed a two-year deal with Chelsea L.F.C. on 24 November 2014 ready for the 2015 season. She made her debut scoring twice in a win against Notts County Ladies. Davison went on to provide six more goals in 26 appearances helping Chelsea lift their first FA WSL 1 title beating Manchester City W.F.C by two points. Chelsea also went on to do the double by winning their first FA Women's Cup. The 2015 Women's FA Cup was the first to be held at Wembley Stadium and saw a 39-minute goal from Ji So-Yun secure a 1–0 victory over Notts County Ladies in front of 30,710. Davison was integral throughout, often from a position wide on the right as she linked up to devastating effect. Chelsea faced Glasgow City in the first round of the UEFA Women's Champions League beating city 1–0 at home and 3–0 in the away fixture. Chelsea advance through to the round of 16 facing two-time winners VFL Wolfsburg. Chelsea would go on to lose both home and away ending their Champions League run.

In September 2016, it was announced that Davison had signed a new contract until the summer of 2018. In the 2016 season, Davison played in 22 games scoring 3 times as Chelsea finished second in the WSL 1 five points behind Manchester City W.F.C. Chelsea faced Manchester City in the semi-final of the women's FA Cup. Davison played the full game as Chelsea scored a winning goal in extra time sending them to final to face Arsenal Ladies. Chelsea had the opportunity to retain their title against Arsenal but failed to score after an early goal from Danielle Carter at Wembley Stadium in front of 32,912 fans. Chelsea Ladies drew VfL Wolfsburg in the first round of the UEFA Women's Champions League after they knocked Chelsea out the previous year. Wolfsburg defeated Chelsea 3–0 in their first game played at Stamford Bridge. The second leg in Germany finished a 1–1 draw and resulted in Chelsea being knocked out of the competition.

=== Reading 2018–19 ===
On 8 July 2018 Reading manager Kelly Chambers signed Davison from Chelsea.

=== Tottenham Hotspur 2019–21 ===
On 25 May 2020 Tottenham released Davison at the end of her contract.

=== Aston Villa 2021–22 ===
On 3 September 2021 it was announced that Davison had joined Aston Villa on a short-term contract. It was announced on 4 January 2022 that Davison had left Aston Villa at the end of her contract.

== International career ==
Davison played for England regularly at Under-19, Under-21 and Under-23 level. In April 2009 she received her first call-up to the England senior squad. Her England debut came in July 2009 when she came on as a substitute for Jessica Clarke in the 2–0 defeat at home to Iceland.

Subsequently, out of favour with England coach Hope Powell, in December 2013 Davison was named in the first senior squad by Powell's successor Mark Sampson. She was named on the standby list for the 2015 FIFA Women's World Cup in Canada.

On 7 June 2016 Davison opened her account for England in her 12th appearance in a 7–0 euro qualifying win over Serbia. Having scored her first goal she secured her second international goal just five minutes later, in the opening minutes of the second half, helping England seal qualification to the 2017 European Championship in the Netherlands.

Davison was allotted 172 when the FA announced their legacy numbers scheme to honour the 50th anniversary of England's inaugural international.

== Coaching career ==
In October 2023, Davison rejoined her former club Chelsea in a coaching role, seemingly replacing outgoing coach Tanya Oxtoby who was appointed manager of the Northern Ireland women's national team.

== Statistics ==
Club	Season	League		Europe		WFA Cup		Premier League Cup		Other		Total	
Club	Season	Apps	Goals	Apps	Goals	Apps	Goals	Apps	Goals	Apps	Goals	Apps	Goals
Arsenal Ladies	2006–07	21	4	7	1	5	4	4	1	–	–	37	10
Arsenal Ladies	2007–08	18	1	2	0	5	2	4	0	2	1	31	4
New York Magic	2008												
Arsenal Ladies	2008–09	22	7	5	2	5	1	5	0	3	1	40	11
Chicago Red Eleven	2009												
Arsenal Ladies	2009–10	22	12	6	1	5	0	4	0	3	0	40	13
Buffalo Flash	2010												

=== International goals ===
Scores and results list England's goal tally first.

Goal	Date	Venue	Opponent	Score	Result	Competition
1.	7 June 2016	Sports Center of FA of Serbia, Stara Pazova, Serbia	Serbia	3–0	7–0	Euro 2017 qualifying
2.	7 June 2016	Sports Center of FA of Serbia, Stara Pazova, Serbia	Serbia	4–0	7–0	Euro 2017 qualifying

== Honours ==
=== Club ===
Buffalo Flash

- USL W-League Championship: 2010

Western New York Flash

- WPS Championship: 2011

Arsenal Ladies

- FA Women's Super League 1: 2012
- FA Women's Cup: 2013
- FA WSL Cup: 2013

Liverpool Ladies

- FA Women's Super League 1: 2014

Chelsea Ladies

- FA Women's Super League 1: 2015, 2017-18
- FA Women's Cup: 2015

=== Individual ===
- PFA WSL 1 Team of the Year (1): 2013
