= Laura Bassett =

English footballer

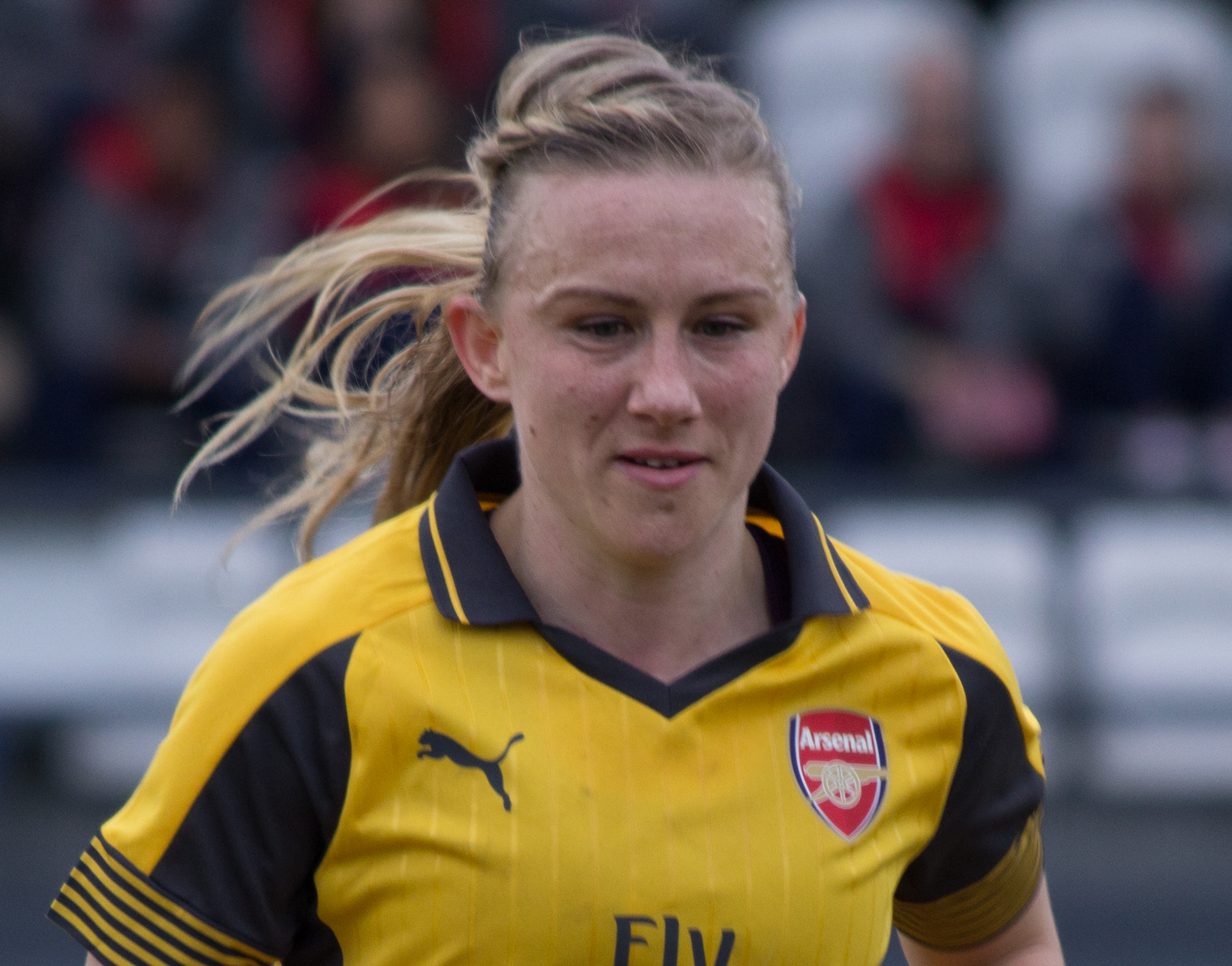
- Bassett in 2017

Personal information
- Full name: Laura Bassett
- Date of birth: 2 August 1983 (age 43)
- Place of birth: Nuneaton, Warwickshire, England
- Height: 1.65 m (5 ft 5 in)
- Position: Defender

Youth career
- 1993–1997: Bedworth Girls

Senior career*
Years	Team	Apps	(Gls)
1997–2000	Coventry City		
2000–2008	Birmingham City		
2006	→ New York Magic (loan)		
2008–2009	Arsenal	17	(0)
2009–2010	Leeds United	16	(0)
2010–2013	Birmingham City	39	(0)
2014	Chelsea	13	(0)
2015–2017	Notts County	29	(0)
2017–2018	Canberra United	12	(1)

International career
2003–2017	England	63	(2)
Medal record
Women's football
Representing England
FIFA Women's World Cup
Bronze medal – third place	2015 Canada
- * Club domestic league appearances and goals as of 21 February 2018

Laura Bassett (born 2 August 1983) is an English former football defender who represented England internationally. She played for FA WSL club Notts County, Birmingham City (two separate spells), Arsenal, Leeds Carnegie, Chelsea, and Australian W-League club Canberra United.

Bassett acquired over 60 caps for the national team between 2003 and 2017, being part of the squad at UEFA Women's Euro 2009, the 2011 FIFA Women's World Cup, UEFA Women's Euro 2013, the 2015 FIFA Women's World Cup and UEFA Women's Euro 2017.

== Club career ==
Bassett grew up in Bulkington and joined Bedworth girls as a nine-year-old. At 14 she joined Coventry City and played in the FA Women's Premier League Northern Division while still a pupil at North Warwickshire and Hinckley College. She then moved to Birmingham City and became captain, while on a scholarship at the FA Player Development Centre at Loughborough University. She spent summer 2006 playing in the W-League with New York Magic.

Bassett left Birmingham for Arsenal in 2008. She signed for Leeds Carnegie in October 2009 and helped the Yorkshire club win the Premier League Cup in February 2010.

After Leeds' funding and FA WSL bid collapsed, Bassett spent a period without a club. In October 2010 it was revealed that she had re-signed for Birmingham City. In April 2012 Bassett was appointed as one of eight digital media ambassadors, one from each team, who wear their Twitter account name on their shirt sleeves to raise the profile of the WSL. At the end of the 2013 season, club captain Bassett rejected Birmingham's offer of a new contract and joined Chelsea.

With Bassett Chelsea finished as runners-up in the 2014 FA WSL, but she signed a three-year contract with Notts County ahead of the 2015 campaign.

Following Notts County's folding in April 2017, Bassett became a free agent. She joined Australian club Canberra United for the 2017–18 Australian W-League season.

Bassett sat out the 2018–19 season to give birth to her daughter Saede. On 3 June 2019 she announced her retirement.

Bassett was part of the BBC's commentary team for the 2019 FIFA Women's World Cup.

== International career ==
Bassett represented England at youth level, including at the 2002 FIFA U-19 Women's World Championship. When she made her senior debut against Italy in February 2003, she became the first Birmingham City Ladies player to play for England at full international level.

In May 2009, Bassett was one of the first 17 female players to be given central contracts by The Football Association. She made her FIFA Women's World Cup debut in July 2011, replacing Ellen White for the final minute of England's 2–0 group B win over Japan.

Bassett scored a last-minute equaliser in England's opening UEFA Women's Euro 2013 match against Spain, but Karen Bardsley's injury time own goal gave the Spanish a 3–2 win.

Under new coach Mark Sampson, Bassett started England's first game at the 2015 FIFA Women's World Cup, a 1–0 defeat by France. She sustained a black eye after being elbowed in the face by Camille Abily, but the French player controversially escaped any punishment. During added time in the semi-final match against Japan, Bassett lobbed the ball into England's goal while trying to clear it to prevent Japan from taking an open shot, resulting in a 2–1 defeat.

She captained England for their UEFA Women's Euro 2017 first phase match against Portugal, her last appearance for England.

She was allotted 146 when the FA announced their legacy numbers scheme to honour the 50th anniversary of England’s inaugural international.

=== International goals ===
Scores and results list England's goal tally first.

Goal	Date	Venue	Opponent	Score	Result	Competition
1.	12 July 2013	Arena Linköping, Linköping, Sweden	Spain	2–2	2–3	Euro 2013
2.	21 August 2014	Cardiff City Stadium, Cardiff	Wales	4–0	4–0	2015 FIFA World Cup qualification

== Personal life ==
Bassett is in a long-term relationship with former Manchester United Women manager Marc Skinner, having met while both coaching for Birmingham's U-14s team. Their daughter, Saede, was born in December 2018. Their second child was born in March 2024.

== Honours ==
Birmingham City

- FA Women's Cup: 2011–12

England

- UEFA Women's Championship runner-up: 2009
- FIFA Women's World Cup third place: 2015
- Cyprus Cup: 2013, 2015
