= 2004 FA Women's Community Shield =

Annual football match

2004 Women's FA Community Shield
Arsenal	Charlton Athletic
0	1
- Date: 11 August 2004
- Venue: Broadhall Way, Stevenage
- Referee: Mr S J Long
- Attendance: 1,487

The 2004 Women's FA Community Shield was the fifth Women's FA Community Shield, as with its male equivalent, the Community Shield is an annual football match played between the winners of the previous season's league and the previous season's Women's FA Cup. The match was contested between Charlton Athletic and Arsenal, with Charlton Athletic winning 1–0.

== Match ==
=== Details ===
11 August 2004
19:45 BST

Arsenal	0–1	Charlton Athletic
	Report	Heatherson 41'

Broadhall Way, Stevenage
Attendance: 1,487
Referee: Mr S J Long

Arsenal	Charlton Athletic

GK	13	(Republic of Ireland) Emma Byrne
DF	2	(England) Kirsty Pealling
DF	5	(England) Leanne Champ
DF	23	(England) Mary Phillip
DF	17	(England) Hayley Kemp
MF	12	(Republic of Ireland) Elaine O'Connor		(substituted off) 45'
MF	4	(Wales) Jayne Ludlow (c)	(yellow card) 59'
MF	7	(Republic of Ireland) Ciara Grant
FW	11	(England) Clare Wheatley		(substituted off) 85'
FW	9	(England) Lianne Sanderson		(substituted off) 90'
FW	10	(Scotland) Julie Fleeting
Substitutes:
GK	24	(England) Jasmine Cripps
MF	21	(England) Lisa Burrows
FW	14	(England) Justine Lorton		(substituted on) 45'
FW	22	(England) Dunia Susi		(substituted on) 85'
FW	24	(England) Gemma Davison		(substituted on) 90'
Manager:
(England) Vic Akers

GK	1	(England) Pauline Cope
DF	7	(England) Danielle Murphy
DF	2	(England) Casey Stoney (c)
DF	5	(England) Karen Hills
DF	3	(England) Eartha Pond	(yellow card) 87'
MF	11	(England) Eni Aluko		(substituted off) 66'
MF	4	(England) Jessica Smith
MF	6	(England) Katie Chapman
FW	10	(England) Joanne Broadhurst
FW	12	(England) Ann-Marie Heatherson		(substituted off) 72'
FW	9	(England) Carmaine Walker
Substitutes:
	17	(England) Jade Wilson
	16	(England) Nicky Morris
MF	14	(England) Susan Rea
MF	15	(England) Danielle Farmer		(substituted on) 66'
MF	8	(England) Alexa Hunn		(substituted on) 72'
Manager:
(England) Keith Boanas
