= 2005 FA Women's Community Shield =

Annual football match

2005 Women's FA Community Shield
Arsenal	Charlton Athletic
4	0
- Date: 4 August 2005
- Venue: National Hockey Stadium, Milton Keynes
- Player of the Match: Jayne Ludlow
- Referee: Amy Rayner
- Attendance: 2,613

The 2005 Women's FA Community Shield was the sixth Women's FA Community Shield, as with its male equivalent, the Community Shield is an annual football match played between the winners of the previous season's league and the previous season's Women's FA Cup. Arsenal won 4–0.

== Match ==
=== Details ===
4 August 2005
19:45 BST

Arsenal	4–0	Charlton Athletic
Grant 13'; Ludlow 15', 90+3'; Sanderson 60'	Report

National Hockey Stadium, Milton Keynes
Attendance: 2,613
Referee: Amy Rayner

Arsenal	Charlton Athletic

GK	13	(Republic of Ireland) Emma Byrne
DF	3	(Republic of Ireland) Yvonne Tracy
DF	6	(England) Faye White
DF	23	(England) Mary Phillip
DF	5	(England) Leanne Champ
MF	18	(England) Anita Asante
MF	11	(England) Rachel McArthur	(yellow card) 74'
MF	7	(Republic of Ireland) Ciara Grant
MF	2	(England) Kirsty Pealling		(substituted off) 32'
FW	4	(Wales) Jayne Ludlow	(yellow card) 81'
FW	9	(England) Lianne Sanderson
Substitutes:
GK	13	(Wales) Lauren Wells
DF	15	(England) Cori Daniels
MF	8	(England) Kelly Smith
MF	21	(England) Lisa Burrows
FW	20	(England) Gemma Davison		(substituted on) 32'
Manager:
(England) Vic Akers

GK	1	(England) Pauline Cope		(substituted off) 45'
DF	5	(England) Karen Hills
DF	2	(England) Casey Stoney
DF	4	(England) Sarah Wooliscroft		(substituted off) 45'
DF	3	(England) Dominique Sinclair-Chambers	(yellow card) 33'
MF	8	(England) Alexa Hunn
MF	10	(England) Sian Williams		(substituted off) 45'
MF	6	(England) Katie Chapman	(yellow card) 13'
MF	7	(England) Danielle Murphy
MF	11	(England) Gemma Ritchie
FW	9	(England) Eniola Aluko
Substitutes:
GK	13	(England) Ebony Cabey-Gooden		(substituted on) 45'
DF	15	(England) Maria Bertelli		(substituted on) 45'
MF	12	(England) Emma Coss		(substituted on) 45'
MF	16	(England) Kim Dixson
FW	14	(England) Carmaine Walker
Manager:
(England) Keith Boanas
