= 2005 FA Women's Cup final =

2005 FA Women's Cup Final
- The match programme cover
- Event: 2004–05 FA Women's Cup
Charlton Athletic	Everton
1	0
- Date: 2 May 2005
- Venue: Boleyn Ground, London
- Player of the Match: Eni Aluko (Charlton Athletic)
- Referee: Mike Jones (Cheshire)
- Attendance: 8,567

The 2005 FA Women's Cup Final was the 35th final of the FA Women's Cup, England's primary cup competition for women's football teams. It was the 12th final to be held under the direct control of the Football Association (FA) and was known as the FA Women's Cup Final in partnership with Nationwide for sponsorship reasons. The final was contested between Charlton Athletic and Everton on 2 May 2005.

Charlton Athletic entered their third consecutive final having lost the previous two. Everton reached the final for the first time, although an earlier incarnation of the club, known as Leasowe Pacific, had lost the 1988 final and won in 1989.

As top-flight FA Women's Premier League clubs, both Charlton Athletic and Everton entered the competition at the fourth round stage. Charlton Athletic beat Wolverhampton Wanderers, West Ham United, Sunderland and Bristol Rovers to reach the final. Everton faced Bristol City, Leafield Athletic, Chelsea and Arsenal before reaching the final.

Charlton Athletic won the game 1–0, with a 58th-minute goal by Eniola Aluko.

== Media ==
=== Match programme ===
The match programme cover was designed by 15-year-old Gillian Prescott, whose illustration won a competition in the Sunday Express newspaper. From a family of noted women's football supporters in the North West, Sheila Parker was her godmother. Prescott, who had cerebral palsy, died in January 2010.

=== Details ===
2 May 2005
13:00 BST

Charlton Athletic	1–0	Everton
Aluko 58'	Report

Boleyn Ground, London
Attendance: 8,567
Referee: Mike Jones (Cheshire)

Charlton Athletic	Everton

GK	1	(England) Pauline Cope
RB	5	(England) Karen Hills
RCB	4	(England) Emma Coss
LCB	2	(England) Casey Stoney (c)
LB	19	(England) Dominique Sinclair-Chambers
RW	7	(England) Danielle Murphy
RCM	14	(England) Jessica Smith
LCM	15	(England) Sian Williams
LW	10	(England) Jo Broadhurst
FW	12	(England) Ann-Marie Heatherson	(substituted off) 69'
FW	11	(England) Eni Aluko
Substitutes:
GK	?	(England) Ebony Cabey-Gooden
FW	16	(England) Jodian Clarke	(substituted on) 69'
MF	8	(England) Alexa Hunn
DF	18	(England) Leanne Reidy
FW	22	(England) Sarah Snare
Manager:
(England) Keith Boanas

GK	1	(England) Danielle Hill
RB	2	(England) Becky Easton
RCB	5	(England) Samantha Britton
LCB	6	(England) Lindsay Johnson
LB	3	(England) Rachel Unitt
RW	7	(England) Jody Handley
RCM	4	(England) Fara Williams
LCM	8	(England) Leanne Duffy (c)		(substituted off) 66'
LW	11	(England) Amy Kane		(substituted off) 86'
MF	10	(England) Kelly McDougall
FW	9	(England) Chantelle Parry	(yellow card) 24'
Substitutes:
MF	16	(England) Michelle Evans		(substituted on) 66'
FW	14	(England) Jenny Jones		(substituted off) 86'
DF	?	(England) Jayne Eadie
DF	?	(England) Cathy Jones
MF	?	(England) Tammy Byrne
Manager:
(England) Mo Marley

Player of the match
Eni Aluko (Charlton Athletic)

Assistant referees:
Wayne Grunnill (East Riding)
Oliver Langford (West Midlands)
Fourth official:
Bob Desmond (Gloucestershire)

Match rules

- 90 minutes.
- 30 minutes of extra-time if necessary.
- Penalty shoot-out if scores still level.
- Five named substitutes.
- Maximum of three substitutions.
