= The FA Women's Football Awards =

Women's football awards in England

- Description: Annual awards recognizing excellence in English women's football
- Country: England
- Presented by: The Football Association (The FA)
- First award: 1999
- Final award: 2019
- Website: https://www.thefa.com/women

The FA Women's Football Awards was an award ceremony hosted by The Football Association in England. The inaugural edition took place in 1999.

== Top Goalscorer ==
Below is a list of all the recipients of this award:

Year		Name	Club	League	Ref.
1999	(England)	Marieanne Spacey	Arsenal	FA WPL National Division	
2001	(England)	Angela Banks	Arsenal	FA WPL National Division	
2001	(England)	Kelly Dean	Oldham Curzon	FA WPL Northern Division	
2001	(England)	Kristy Moore	Barnet	FA WPL Southern Division	
2002	(England)	Marieanne Spacey	Arsenal	FA WPL National Division	
2002	(England)	Katy Ward	Birmingham City	FA WPL Northern Division	
2002	(Norway)	Marianne Pettersen	Fulham	FA WPL Southern Division	
2003	(England)	Amanda Barr	Charlton Athletic	FA WPL National Division	
2003	(England)	Kelly Dean	Oldham Curzon	FA WPL Northern Division	
2003	(England)	Melanie Reay	Sunderland	FA WPL Northern Division	
2003	(England)	Trudy Williams	Bristol Rovers	FA WPL Southern Division	
2005	(England)	Trudy Williams	Bristol Rovers	FA WPL National Division	
2005	(Northern Ireland)	Amy McCann	Wolverhampton Wanderers	FA WPL Northern Division	
2005	(England)	Emma Mead	Brighton & Hove Albion	FA WPL Southern Division	
2006	(England)	Kelly Smith	Arsenal	FA WPL National Division	
2006	(England)	Vicky Abbott	Tranmere Rovers	FA WPL Northern Division	
2006	(Wales)	Helen Ward	Watford	FA WPL Southern Division	
2007	(England)	Lianne Sanderson	Arsenal	FA WPL National Division	
2007	(England)	Jodie Michalska	Lincoln	FA WPL Northern Division	
2007	(Wales)	Helen Ward	Watford	FA WPL Southern Division	
2008	(England)	Lianne Sanderson	Arsenal	FA WPL National Division	
2008	(England)	Ann-Marie Heatherson	Fulham	FA WPL Northern Division	
2008	(England)	Melanie Reay	Newcastle United	FA WPL Southern Division	
2009	(England)	Kelly Smith	Arsenal	FA WPL National Division	
2009	(England)	Jodie Michalska	Lincoln	FA WPL Northern Division	
2009	(England)	Sam Pittuck	West Ham United	FA WPL Southern Division	
2010	(Scotland)	Kim Little	Arsenal	FA WPL National Division	
2010	(Wales)	Cheryl Foster	Liverpool	FA WPL Northern Division	
2010	(England)	Stacey Sowden	Barnet	FA WPL Southern Division	
2011	(England)	Rachel Williams	Birmingham City	FA WSL	
2011	(England)	Gemma Bryan	Charlton Athletic	FA WPL	
2012	(Scotland)	Kim Little	Arsenal	FA WSL	
2012	(England)	Beth Mead	Sunderland	FA WPL National Division	
2012	(England)	Jodie Michalska	Sheffield	FA WPL Northern Division	
2012	(England)	Tash Knapman	Plymouth Argyle	FA WPL Southern Division	
2013	(England)	Natasha Dowie	Liverpool	FA WSL	
2013	(England)	Beth Mead	Sunderland	FA WPL National Division	
2013	(England)	Jodie Michalska	Sheffield	FA WPL Northern Division	
2013	(England)	Fran Kirby	Reading	FA WPL Southern Division	
2014	(England)	Karen Carney	Birmingham City	FA WSL	
2014	(England)	Fran Kirby	Reading	FA WSL 2	
2014	(England)	Natasha Baptiste	Aston Villa	FA WSL Development League	
2014	(England)	Jodie Michalska	Sheffield	FA WPL Northern Division	
2014	(England)	Charlotte Gurr	Gillingham	FA WPL Southern Division	
2015	(England)	Beth Mead	Sunderland	FA WSL 1	
2015	(England)	Courtney Sweetman-Kirk	Doncaster Rovers Belles	FA WSL 2	
2015	(England)	Kit Graham	Charlton Athletic	FA WPL Northern Division	
2015	(England)	Jodie Michalska	Sheffield	FA WPL Southern Division	
2015	(England)	Tanya Rich		FA WPL Northern Division One	
2015	(England)	Natalie Shaw		FA WPL Midlands Division One	
2015	(England)	Sara Sinclair		FA WPL South East Division One	
2015	(England)	Tash Knapman	Plymouth Argyle	FA WPL South West Division One	
2016	(England)	Eni Aluko	Chelsea	FA WSL	
2017	(England)	Fran Kirby	Chelsea	FA WSL 1	
2017	(England)	Courtney Sweetman-Kirk	Doncaster Rovers Belles	FA WSL 2	
2017	(England)	Bianca Owens		FA WPL Northern Division	
2017	(England)	Gemma Bryan		FA WPL Southern Division	
2017	(England)	Nikki Berko		FA WPL Northern Division One	
2017	(England)	Cara Newton		FA WPL Midlands Division One	
2017	(England)	Felicity Gibbons		FA WPL South East Division One	
2017	(England)	Tash Knapman	Plymouth Argyle	FA WPL South West Division One	
2018	(England)	Ellen White	Birmingham City	FA WSL 1	
2018	(England)	Jessica Sigsworth	Doncaster Rovers Belles	FA WSL 2	
2018	(England)	Rosie Axten	Leicester City	FA WPL Northern Division	
2018	(England)	Kit Graham	Charlton Athletic	FA WPL Southern Division	
2018	(England)	Jodie Redgrave	Brighouse Town	FA WPL Northern Division One	
2018	(England)	Yasmine Swarbrick	Hull City, Morecambe	FA WPL Northern Division One	
2018	(England)	Jordan Atkin	Burton Albion	FA WPL Midlands Division One	
2018	(Italy)	Alessandra Barreca	Actonians	FA WPL South East Division One	
2018	(England)	Natasha Knapman	Plymouth Argyle	FA WPL South West Division One	
2019	(Netherlands)	Vivianne Miedema	Arsenal	FA Women's Super League	
2019	(England)	Jessica Sigsworth	Manchester United	FA Women's Championship	
2019	(England)	Saffron Jordan	Blackburn Rovers	FA WNL Northern Premier Division	
2019	(England)	Emily Allen	Oxford United	FA WNL Southern Premier Division	
2019	(England)	Kerry Bartlett	Keynsham Town	FA WNL Division One South West	
2019	(England)	Jade Cross	Wolverhampton Wanderers	FA WNL Division One Midlands	
2019	(Italy)	Alessandra Barreca	Actonians	FA WNL Division One South East	
2019	(England)	Bianca Owens	Norton & Stockton Ancients	FA WNL Division One North	

== Players' Player of the Year ==
Below is a list of all the recipients of this award:

Year	Name	Club	League	Ref.
1999	Sue Smith	Tranmere Rovers	FA WPL National Division	
1999	Kelly Biney	Sheffield Wednesday	FA WPL Northern Division	
1999	Angela Banks	Whitehawk	FA WPL Southern Division	
2000	Karen Walker	Doncaster Belles	FA WPL National Division	
2000	Rachel Mander	Sheffield Wednesday	FA WPL Northern Division	
2000	Trudy Williams	Barry Town	FA WPL Southern Division	
2001	Jayne Ludlow	Arsenal	FA WPL National Division	
2001	Stacey Daniel	Leeds United	FA WPL Northern Division	
2001	Kristy Moore	Barnet	FA WPL Southern Division	
2002	Marieanne Spacey	Arsenal	FA WPL National Division	
2002	Anne Blackham	Wolverhampton Wanderers	FA WPL Northern Division	
2002	Marianne Pettersen	Fulham	FA WPL Southern Division	
2003	Jayne Ludlow	Arsenal	FA WPL National Division	
2004	Jayne Ludlow	Arsenal	FA WPL National Division	
2005	Julie Fleeting	Arsenal	FA WPL National Division	
2006	Kelly Smith	Arsenal	FA WPL National Division	
2007	Kelly Smith	Arsenal	FA WPL National Division	
2008	Jill Scott	Everton	FA WPL National Division	
2009	Fara Williams	Everton	FA WPL National Division	
2010	Kim Little	Arsenal	FA WPL National Division	
2011	Rachel Williams	Birmingham	FA WSL	
2012	Jess Fishlock	Bristol Academy	FA WSL	
2013	Natasha Dowie	Liverpool	FA WSL	
2014	Ji So-yun	Chelsea	FA WSL	
2014	Fran Kirby	Reading	FA WSL 2	
2014	Carla Humphrey	Arsenal	FA WSL Development League	
2014	Natasha Baptiste	Aston Villa	FA WSL Development League	
2014	Jodie Michalska	Sheffield	FA WPL Northern Division	
2014	Sam Pittuck	Charlton Athletic	FA WPL Southern Division	
2015	Beth Mead	Sunderland	FA WSL	
2016	Lucy Bronze	Manchester City	FA WSL	
2016	Ini-Abasi Umotong	Oxford United	FA WSL 2	
2016	Lynda Shepherd	Blackburn Rovers	FA WPL Premier Division	
2016	Gemma Woodford	Shanklin	FA WPL Division One	
2017	Jordan Nobbs	Arsenal	FA WSL	
2017	Michelle Hinnigan	Everton	FA WSL 2	
2017	Nikki Berko	Blackpool	FA WPL Premier Division	
2017	Kate Mallin	Huddersfield Town	FA WPL Division One	
2018	Jill Scott	Manchester City	FA WSL 1	
2018	Ann-Katrin Berger	Birmingham City	FA WSL 1	
2018	Zoe Ness	Durham	FA WSL 2	
2018	Leigh Dugmore	Leicester City	FA WPL Premier Division	
2018	Nicola O'Connell	Larkhall Athletic	FA WPL Division One	
2019	Sophie Baggaley	Bristol City	FA Women's Super League	
2019	Kit Graham	Charlton Athletic	FA Women's Championship	
2019	Keira Ramshaw	Sunderland	FA WNL Premier Division	
2019	Leah Embley	Burnley	FA WNL Division One	

== International Young Player of the Year ==
Below is a list of all the recipients of this award:

Year	Name	Club	Age (at the time of award)	Ref.
1999	Katie Chapman	Millwall Lionesses	16 years, 318 days	
2000	Carly Hunt	Charlton Athletic	18 years, 78 days	
2001	Katie Chapman	Fulham	18 years, 351 days	
2002	Fara Williams	Charlton Athletic	18 years, 119 days	
2003	Eni Aluko	Birmingham City	16 years, 97 days	
2004	Ann-Marie Heatherson	Charlton Athletic	20 years, 44 days	
2005	Karen Carney	Birmingham City	17 years, 282 days	
2006	Karen Carney	Birmingham City	18 years, 302 days	
2007	Steph Houghton	Sunderland	19 years, 30 days	
2008	Fern Whelan	Everton	19 years, 170 days	
2009	Toni Duggan	Everton	17 years, 311 days	
2010	Jordan Nobbs	Sunderland	17 years, 204 days	
2011	Jemma Rose	Bristol Academy	19 years, 121 days	
2012	Alex Greenwood	Everton	19 years, 56 days	
2013	Award not presented			
2014	Leah Williamson	Arsenal	17 years, 230 days	
2015	Beth Mead	Sunderland	19 years, 209 days	
2016	Millie Bright	Chelsea	23 years, 89 days	
2017	Lauren Hemp	Bristol City	17 years, 32 days	
2018	Beth Mead	Arsenal	23 years, 23 days	

== International Player of the Year ==
Below is a list of all the recipients of this award:

Year	Name	Club	Ref.
1999	Sue Smith	Tranmere Rovers	
2000	Becky Easton	Everton	
2001	Sue Smith	Tranmere Rovers	
2002	Katie Chapman	Fulham	
2003	Karen Walker	Doncaster Rovers Belles	
2004	Rachel Unitt	Fulham	
2005	Rachel Yankey	Birmingham City	
2006	Rachel Unitt	Everton	
2007	Fara Williams	Everton	
2008	Casey Stoney	Chelsea	
2009	Fara Williams	Everton	
2010	Katie Chapman	Arsenal	
2011	Ellen White	Birmingham City	
2012	Casey Stoney	Lincoln	
2013	Steph Houghton	Arsenal	
2014	Toni Duggan	Manchester City	
2015	Lucy Bronze	Manchester City	
2016	Jordan Nobbs	Arsenal	
2017	Jodie Taylor	Arsenal	
2018	Ellen White	Birmingham City	

Note: this category became a part of the England Player of the Year Awards from 2019 onwards.

== Manager of the Year ==
Below is a list of all the recipients of this award:

Year	Name	Club	League	Ref.
2000	Julie Chipchase	Doncaster Belles	FA WPL National Division	
2001	Vic Akers	Arsenal	FA WPL National Division	
2002	Mark Hodgson	Leeds United	FA WPL National Division	
2003	Marcus Bignot	Birmingham City	FA WPL National Division	
2004	Keith Boanas	Charlton Athletic	FA WPL National Division	
2005	Vic Akers	Arsenal	FA WPL National Division	
2006	Andrew McNally	Blackburn Rovers	FA WPL Northern Division	
2007	Vic Akers	Arsenal	FA WPL National Division	
2008	Mark Saunderson	Fulham	FA WPL Southern Division	
2009	Mick Mulhern	Sunderland	FA WPL Southern Division	
2010	Rick Passmoor	Leeds Carnegie	FA WPL National Division	
2010	Robbie Johnson	Liverpool	FA WPL Northern Division	
2010	Tracey Kevins	Barnet	FA WPL Southern Division	
2011	Laura Harvey	Arsenal	FA WSL	
2011	Mick Mulhern	Sunderland	FA WPL	
2012	Mark Sampson	Bristol Academy	FA WSL	
2012	John Saloman	Watford	FA WPL	
2013	Matt Beard	Liverpool	FA WSL	
2013	Mick Mulhern	Sunderland	FA WPL	
2014	David Parker	Birmingham City	FA WSL	
2014	Helen Mitchell	Sheffield	FA WPL	
2015	Emma Hayes	Chelsea	FA WSL	
2015	Helen Mitchell	Sheffield	FA WPL	
2016	Nick Cushing	Manchester City	FA WSL	
2016	Lindsey Stephenson	Middlesbrough	FA WPL	
2017	Andy Spence	Everton	FA WSL	
2017	Karen Hills	Tottenham Hotspur	FA WPL	
2018	Emma Hayes	Chelsea	FA WSL	
2018	Riteesh Mishra	Charlton Athletic	FA WPL	

== Club of the Year ==
Below is a list of all the recipients of this award:

Year	Club	League	Ref.
2002	Birmingham City	FA WPL Northern Division	
2005	Everton	FA WPL National Division	
2006	Newcastle United	FA WPL Northern Division	
2007	Arsenal	FA WPL National Division	
2008	Nottingham Forest	FA WPL Northern Division	
2009	Arsenal	FA WPL National Division	
2010	Arsenal	FA WPL National Division	
2011	Bristol Academy	FA WSL	
2012	Birmingham City	FA WSL	
2013	Bristol Academy	FA WSL	
2014	Liverpool	FA WSL 1	
2014	Yeovil Town	FA WSL 2	
2014	Sheffield	FA WPL	
2015	Sunderland	FA WSL 1	
2015	Doncaster Rovers Belles	FA WSL 2	
2015	Derby County	FA WPL	
2016	Manchester City	FA WSL 1	
2016	Yeovil Town	FA WSL 2	
2016	Brighton & Hove Albion	FA WPL	
2017	Manchester City	FA WSL 1	
2017	Durham	FA WSL 2	
2017	Tottenham Hotspur	FA WPL	
2018	Chelsea	FA WSL	
2018	Derby County	FA WPL	
2019	Manchester City	FA Women's Super League	
2019	Manchester United	FA Women's Championship	
2019	Coventry United	FA Women's National League	

== Goal of the Year ==
Below is a list of all the recipients of this award:

Year	Name	Club	Ref.
2011	Jemma Rose	Bristol Academy	
2012	Megan Harris	Lincoln	
2013	Steph Houghton	Arsenal	
2014	Toni Duggan	Manchester City	
2015	Ji So-yun	Chelsea	
2016	Claire Emslie	Bristol City	
2019	Beth Mead	Arsenal	

== Save of the Year ==
Below is a list of all the recipients of this award:

Year	Name	Club	Ref.
2011	Siobhan Chamberlain	Bristol Academy	
2018	Sophie Baggaley	Bristol City	
2019	Megan Walsh	Yeovil Town	

== Goalkeeper of the Year ==
Below is a list of all the recipients of this award:

Year	Name	Club	Ref.
2012	Nicola Davies	Liverpool	

== Special Achievement Award ==
Below is a list of all the recipients of this award:

Year	Name	Ref.
2001	Mo Marley	
2010	Sue Prior	
2011	Fay Glover	
2012	Trevor Clifton	
2013	Dawn Barnard	
2014	Sheila Rollinson	
2015	Dave Coyle	
2017	Dick, Kerr Ladies F.C.	
2018	Tony Leighton	
2018	Sue Lopez	
2019	Patricia Gregory	
2019	Peter Hough	

== Fan of the Year ==
Below is a list of all the recipients of this award:

Year	Name	Ref.
2011	Lisa Paterson-Sleep, Sam Paterson-Sleep	

== Participation Award ==
Below is a list of all the recipients of this award:

Year	Name	Ref.
2014	Merseyrail	
2015	Albion in the Community	
2017	Pay & Play	
2017	Mums and Recreational Football	
2018	Future Fives	

== Unsung Hero Award ==
Below is a list of all the recipients of this award:

Year	Name	Ref.
2017	Harriet Miller	
2018	Jackie Batten-Lincoln	
2019	Sue Henson Green	
2019	Steve Shipway	

== FA WSL All Star Team ==
Below is a list of all the recipients of this award:

Year		Name	Club	Position	Ref.
2011	(England)	Siobhan Chamberlain	Bristol Academy	Goalkeeper	
2011	(England)	Sophie Bradley	Lincoln	Defender	
2011	(England)	Casey Stoney	Lincoln	Defender	
2011	(England)	Kerys Harrop	Birmingham City	Defender	
2011	(England)	Laura Bassett	Birmingham City	Defender	
2011	(England)	Jo Potter	Birmingham City	Midfielder	
2011	(England)	Katie Chapman	Arsenal	Midfielder	
2011	(Scotland)	Kim Little	Arsenal	Midfielder	
2011	(Wales)	Jess Fishlock	Bristol Academy	Midfielder	
2011	(England)	Rachel Williams	Birmingham City	Forward	
2011	(England)	Natasha Dowie	Everton	Forward	

== See also ==
- List of sports awards honoring women
- FA WSL Golden Boot
