= 2007 FA Women's Cup final =

English football cup final

2007 FA Women's Cup Final
- The match programme cover
- Event: 2006–07 FA Women's Cup
Arsenal	Charlton Athletic
4	1
- Date: 7 May 2007
- Venue: City Ground, Nottingham
- Player of the Match: Jayne Ludlow (Arsenal)
- Referee: Anthony Bates (Staffordshire)
- Attendance: 24,529

The 2007 FA Women's Cup Final was the 37th final of the FA Women's Cup, England's primary cup competition for women's football teams. It was the 14th final to be held under the direct control of the Football Association (FA). The final was contested between Arsenal and Charlton Athletic at the City Ground on 7 May 2007. Arsenal won the game 4–1 to secure their second successive FA Cup triumph and their eight in total. The match was attended by a crowd of 24,529 and was broadcast live on BBC One.

== Match ==
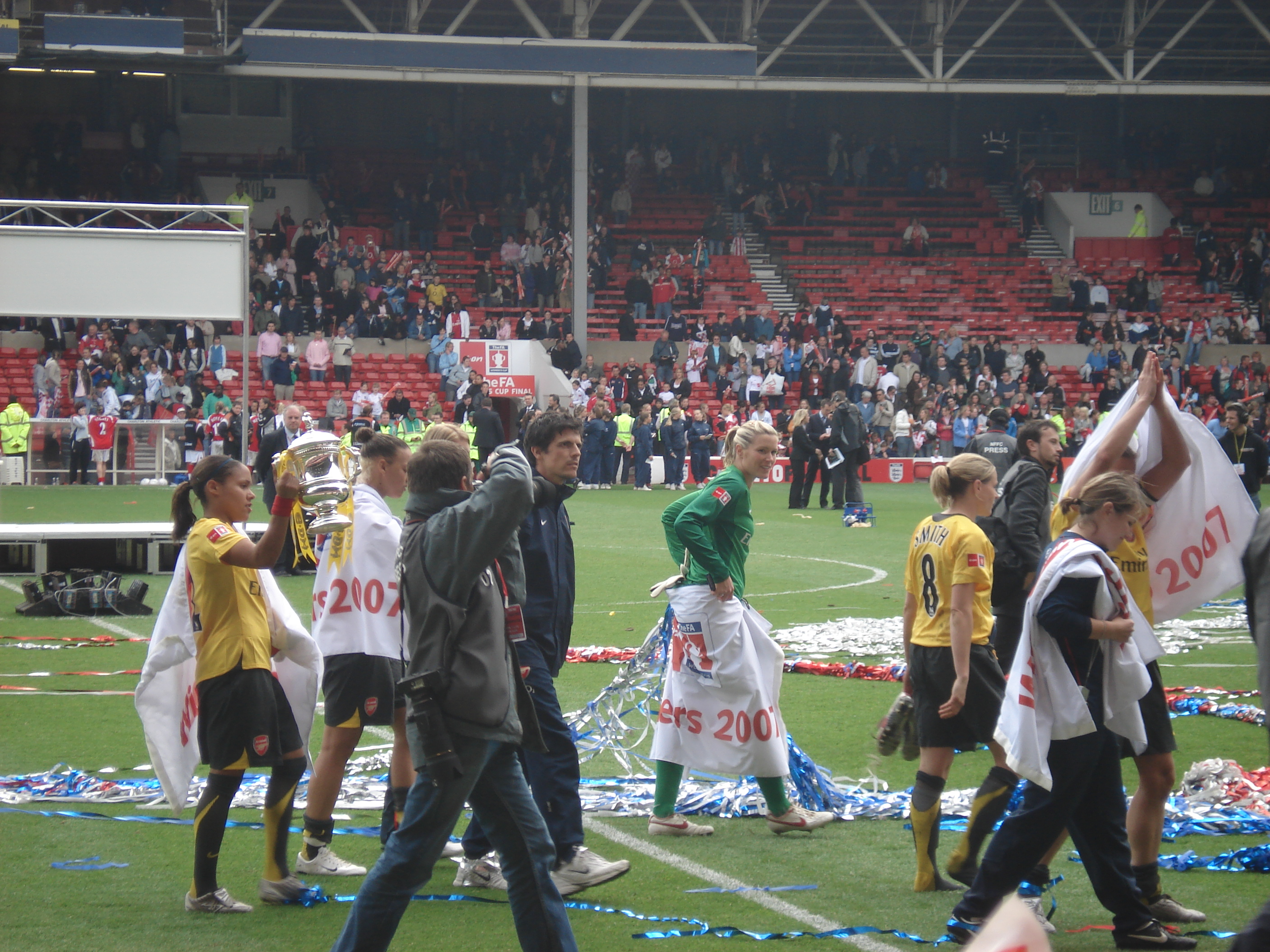
Arsenal parade the trophy

=== Summary ===
Already winners of the UEFA Women's Cup, FA Women's Premier League National Division and the FA Women's Premier League Cup, Arsenal, managed by Vic Akers, came into the game as favourites. Meanwhile Charlton Athletic, managed by Keith Boanas, came through a hard fought semi-final against Blackburn Rovers, with Natasha Dowie scoring the only goal, to make it to their second final.

Charlton Athletic were given the dream start after just two minutes of play, as Eniola Aluko's low cross was slotted in at the far post by Katie Holtham. Arsenal were level within five minutes, as Kelly Smith curled home a 25-yard free-kick after being hacked down by Charlton's right-back Maria Bertelli. The Gunners were in front by the quarter hour after winning a free kick near the corner flag: Jayne Ludlow was the quickest to get to Lianne Sanderson's near post cross and she steered her shot underneath goalkeeper Toni-Anne Wayne. Ludlow then claimed her second goal in first-half stoppage-time with a 30-yard strike which flew into the top corner of the net.

Charlton's best chance of the second half came when Aluko broke away and shot through Emma Byrne's legs, but the shot was diverted wide of the post by the goalkeeper's leg. Meanwhile, the Gunners had plenty of chances to further their lead, but the fourth goal came when Smith curled in a shot nine minutes from time, wrapping up a record-equalling eighth FA Cup win.

=== Details ===
7 May 2007

Arsenal	4–1	Charlton Athletic
K. Smith 7', 80'; Ludlow 15', 45+1'	Report	Holtham 2'

City Ground, Nottingham
Attendance: 24,529
Referee: Anthony Bates (Staffordshire)

Arsenal	Charlton Athletic

GK	1	(Republic of Ireland) Emma Byrne
DF	12	(England) Alex Scott
DF	7	(Republic of Ireland) Ciara Grant
DF	18	(England) Anita Asante
DF	23	(England) Mary Phillip
MF	17	(England) Katie Chapman
MF	4	(Wales) Jayne Ludlow (c)
MF	8	(England) Kelly Smith
FW	9	(England) Lianne Sanderson	(substituted off) 63'
FW	10	(Scotland) Julie Fleeting	(substituted off) 76'
FW	11	(England) Rachel Yankey
Substitutes:
MF	14	(England) Karen Carney	(substituted on) 63'
MF	20	(England) Gemma Davison	(substituted on) 76'
DF	6	(England) Faye White
MF	16	(England) Sian Larkin
GK	24	(Jamaica) Becky Spencer
Manager:
(England) Vic Akers

GK	13	(England) Toni-Anne Wayne
DF	2	(England) Casey Stoney (c)
DF	5	(England) Karen Hills
DF	17	(England) Sinead Boyer
DF	7	(England) Danielle Murphy
DF	6	(England) Maria Bertelli	(yellow card) 7'
MF	14	(England) Jessica Smith		(substituted off) 70'
MF	4	(England) Katie Holtham		(substituted off) 83'
MF	11	(England) Josanne Potter
FW	10	(England) Natasha Dowie		(substituted off) 83'
FW	9	(England) Eni Aluko
Substitutes:
FW	8	(England) Ashlee Hincks		(substituted on) 70'
DF	15	(England) Natasha Hughes		(substituted on) 83'
FW	12	(England) Ann-Marie Heatherson		(substituted on) 83'
DF	3	(England) Michelle Hickmott
GK	1	(England) Pauline Cope
Manager:
(England) Keith Boanas

Player of the match
Jayne Ludlow (Arsenal)

Assistant referees:
Graham Scott
John Stokes
Fourth official:
Shaun Proctor-Green

Match rules

- 90 minutes.
- 30 minutes of extra-time if necessary.
- Penalty shoot-out if scores still level.
- Five named substitutes.
- Maximum of three substitutions.
