= 2004–05 FA Women's Cup =

Tournament details
- Country: England; Wales
- Teams: 210

Final positions
- Champions: Charlton Athletic
- Runners-up: Everton

The 2004–05 FA Women's Cup was the 35th edition of the FA Women's Cup, a knockout cup competition for women's football teams in England. It was sponsored by Nationwide, and known as The FA Women's Cup in partnership with Nationwide for sponsorship purposes. 210 clubs were accepted into the tournament.

National Division side Arsenal were the defending champions, but they were eliminated by Everton in the semi-finals. Charlton Athletic won their first FA Women's Cup title after a 1–0 win over Everton in the final.

== Teams ==
Round	Clubs remaining	Clubs involved	Winners from previous round	New entries this round	Leagues entering at this round
First round proper	114	80	36	44	Midland Combination; Northern Combination; South East Combination; South West Combination
Second round proper	74	40	40	none	none
Third round proper	54	44	20	24	FA WPL Northern Division; FA WPL Southern Division
Fourth round proper	32	32	22	10	FA WPL National Division
Fifth round proper	16	16	16	none	none
Quarter-finals	8	8	8	none	none
Semi-finals	4	4	4	none	none
Final	2	2	2	none	none

== Prize money ==
Round	No. of Clubs receive fund	Prize fund per club
First round qualifying winners	60	£100
Second round qualifying winners	36	£150
First round proper winners	40	£250
Second round proper winners	20	£350
Third round proper winners	22	£500
Fourth round proper winners	16	£600
Fifth round proper winners	8	£750
Quarter-final winners	4	£1,250
Semi-final winners	2	£2,500
Final runners-up	1	£1,000
Final winner	1	£5,000
Total		£71,000

== First round qualifying ==
The matches were played on Sunday 5 September 2004, the only exception being Luton Town Belles v Brentford, which took place on Monday 6 September 2004.

Tie	Home team (tier)	Score	Away team (tier)	Att.
1	Stockport Celtic	A–W	Gateshead Cleveland Hall	
Walkover for Gateshead Cleveland Hall.
2	Wigan Athletic	4–1	York City	
3	Windscale	1–5	Leeds City Vixens	
4	Blyth Spartans	1–3	Huddersfield Town	
5	Morley Spurs	6–1	Darwen	
6	Bolton Wanderers	9–0	Ossett Albion	
7	Liverpool Manweb Feds	11–0	Chew Moor Brook	
8	Garswood Saints	4–2	Killingworth YPC	
9	Cleator Moor Celtic	1–1 (1–4 p)	Durham City	
10	Bradford City	5–2	Penrith Sapphires	
11	Macclesfield Town	2–3	Lumley	
12	Blyth Town	4–2	Thorpe United	
13	South Durham Royals	4–2	Crook Town	
14	Kirklees	2–1	Hopwood	
15	Loughborough Dynamo	2–7	Kirkley	
16	Stoke City	12–0	Heelands Rangers	
17	Cosford	3–2 (a.e.t.)	Rea Valley	
18	Derby County	8–0	Barwell	
19	Belper Town	0–11	Leicester City	
20	Colchester Town	0–8	Buxton	
21	Valiant	0–10	Peterborough Azure	
22	Cambridge United	21–0	Bradwell Belles	
23	Solihull Glades	1–5	A.F.C. Telford United	
24	Southam United	4–1	Birmingham University	
25	The New Saints	7–1	Birstall United	
26	Colchester United	13–0	Rushcliffe Eagles	
27	Dudley United	0–5	Stratford Town	
28	Dynamo North London	2–2 (5–2 p)	Slough	
29	Dagenham & Redbridge	H–W	Maidstone Mavrix	
Walkover for Dagenham & Redbridge.
30	AEI Gravesend	7–0	Wycombe Wanderers	

Tie	Home team (tier)	Score	Away team (tier)	Att.
31	Ashdown Rovers	11–2	Southampton Women	
32	Brentwood Town	3–2 (a.e.t.)	Haywards Heath Town	
33	Hampton & Richmond Borough	15–0	FC London	
34	Haringey Borough	1–7	Chelmsford City	
35	London Women	9–0	Hoddesdon Owls	
36	Carterton	1–5	Clapton Orient	
37	Panthers	2–1	Woodbridge Town	
38	Redhill	4–0	Hitchin Town	
39	Redbridge	A–W	Henley Town	
Walkover for Henley Town.
40	Thatcham Town	6–2	Eastbourne Town	
41	Luton Borough	A–W	Hastings United	
Walkover for Hastings United.
42	Woking	7–1	Hendon	
43	Tottenham Hotspur	1–0	Banbury United	
44	Leighton Linslade	0–1	Billericay	
45	MK Wanderers	2–4	Viking	
46	AFC Newbury	7–2	Morden United	
47	Woodstock	1–3	Royston Town	
48	Bowers & Pitsea	3–4 (a.e.t.)	Dover Athletic	
49	Saffron Walden Town	2–6	Crowborough Athletic	
50	Aylesbury United	8–3	Abbey Rangers	
51	Lewes	H–W	Basildon Town	
Walkover for Lewes.
52	CEFI	3–3 (3–1 p)	Haywood United	
53	Yeovil Town	9–2	Swindon Spitfires	
54	Ross Town	4–3	Penzance	
55	Madron	H–W	Reading Girls	
Walkover for Madron.
56	Bath City	7–1	Launceston	
57	Alphington	0–3	Isca Vikings	
58	Team Bath	1–2 (a.e.t.)	Newquay AFC	
59	Aldershot Town	3–1	St Peter's	
60	Luton Town Belles	5–6	Brentford	

== Second round qualifying ==
All matches were played on Sunday 26 September 2004.

Tie	Home team (tier)	Score	Away team (tier)	Att.
1	Bolton Wanderers	2–1	Lumley	
2	Leeds City Vixens	3–0	Huddersfield Town	
3	Liverpool Manweb Feds	3–4	Garswood Saints	
4	Bury	1–1 (4–1 p)	Barnsley	
5	Gateshead Cleveland Hall	0–5	Darlington RA	
6	Wigan Athletic	5–3	Blyth Town	
7	Kirklees	0–1	South Durham Royals	
8	Durham City	0–6	Morley Spurs	
9	Bradford City	10–0	Bolton Ambassadors	
10	AFC Telford United	2–5 (a.e.t.)	Derby County	
11	Buxton	2–0	Kettering Town	
12	Stoke City	4–3	Cosford	
13	Cambridge United	7–0	Kirkley	
14	Whittington	0–14	The New Saints	
15	Walsall	2–7	Colchester United	
16	Peterborough Azure	2–1	Southam United	
17	Stratford Town	2–7	Leicester City	
18	CEFI	4–3 (a.e.t.)	Woking	

Tie	Home team (tier)	Score	Away team (tier)	Att.
19	Crowborough Athletic	1–3	London Women	
20	Lordswood	3–1	Chelmsford City	
21	AFC Newbury	2–4	Brentford	
22	Dagenham & Redbridge	3–0	Royston Town	
23	Panthers	4–0	Brentwood Town	
24	Lewes	3–1	Viking	
25	Henley Town	7–2	Billericay	
26	Dover Athletic	0–2	AEI Gravesend	
27	Thatcham Town	2–1	Aylesbury United	
28	Hastings United	1–3	Tottenham Hotspur	
29	Redhill	5–2	Hampton & Richmond Borough	
30	Dynamo North London	2–1	Clapton Orient	
31	Yeovil Town	7–0	Buckfastleigh Rangers	
32	Exeter City	1–7	Newquay AFC	
33	Ross Town	8–0	Madron	
34	AFC Bournemouth	6–2	Gloucester City	
35	Isca Vikings	3–6 (a.e.t.)	Bath City	
36	Ashdown Rovers	3–2	Aldershot Town	

== First round proper ==
The draw took place on Monday 27 September 2004. The matches were scheduled to be played on Sunday 24 October 2004. Fourteen matches (Bath City v Swindon Town, Bolton Wanderers v Doncaster Parklands Rovers, Buxton v Ilkeston Town, Cardiff City Bluebirds v AFC Bournemouth, CEFI v Reading, Crewe Alexandra v Scunthorpe United, Garswood Saints v Bradford City, Lewes v Brentford, Plymouth Argyle v Ashdown Rovers, Preston North End v Bury, Redhill v Chesham United, Shrewsbury Town v Leicester City Ladies, Wembley v Thatcham Town and Wigan Athletic v Blackpool Wren Rovers) were postponed and rescheduled for the following Sunday (31 October 2004). One match (Newton Abbot v Forest Green Rovers) was played on Monday 8 November 2004.

Tie	Home team (tier)	Score	Away team (tier)	Att.
1	Barnet (3)	3–1	Tottenham Hotspur (4)	
2	Bedford Town Bells (3)	4–1	Stoke City (4)	
3	Cambridge City (4)	0–2	Nottingham Forest (3)	
4	Chester City (3)	2–0	Darlington RA (4)	
5	Chester-le-Street (3)	0–1	Newcastle United (3)	
6	Colchester United (4)	2–1	The New Saints (4)	
7	Dagenham & Redbridge (4)	1–1 (2–4 p)	Gillingham (3)	
8	Keynsham Town (3)	5–2	Newquay (4)	
9	Launton (3)	2–1	AEI Gravesend (4)	
10	Leafield Athletic (3)	2–0	Derby County (4)	
11	Leicester City (4)	7–0	Stafford Rangers (3)	
12	Leyton Orient (3)	0–1	Queens Park Rangers (3)	
13	Lichfield Diamonds (3)	3–4	Chesterfield (3)	
14	London Women (4)	1–3 (a.e.t.)	Sophtlogic (3)	
15	Lordswood (6)	3–0	Barking (3)	
16	Morley Spurs (4)	1–3	Leeds City Vixens (4)	
17	Northampton Town (3)	3–1	Loughborough Students (3)	
18	Oxford City (3)	H–W	Henley Town (4)	
Walkover for Oxford City.
19	Peterborough Azure (n)	2–4	Norwich City (3)	
20	Reading Royals (3)	10–1	Panthers (7)	

Tie	Home team (tier)	Score	Away team (tier)	Att.
21	Rushden & Diamonds (3)	2–3	Long Eaton Villa (3)	
22	South Durham Royals (5)	2–1	Manchester United (3)	
23	West Ham United (3)	3–0	Dynamo North London (7)	
24	Yeovil Town (5)	1–2	Cleveden Town (3)	
25	Bath City (4)	0–4	Swindon Town (3)	
26	Bolton Wanderers (4)	2–3	Doncaster Parklands Rovers (3)	
27	Buxton (7)	2–2 (0–3 p)	Ilkeston Town (3)	
28	Cardiff City Bluebirds (3)	5–1	AFC Bournemouth (4)	
29	CEFI (5)	6–2	Reading (3)	
30	Crewe Alexandra (3)	4–0	Scunthorpe United (3)	
31	Garswood Saints (4)	3–3 (4–2 p)	Bradford City (4)	
32	Lewes (4)	3–2	Brentford (4)	
33	Plymouth Argyle (3)	9–1	Ashdown Rovers (5)	
34	Preston North End (3)	3–0	Bury (5)	
35	Redhill (4)	0–5	Chesham United (3)	
36	Shrewsbury Town (3)	0–5	Leicester City Ladies (3)	
37	Wembley (3)	1–3 (a.e.t.)	Thatcham Town (5)	
38	Wigan Athletic (5)	0–8	Blackpool Wren Rovers (3)	
39	Newton Abbot (3)	1–1 (5–4 p)	Forest Green Rovers (3)	
BYE: Ross Town (4)

== Second round proper ==
The matches were played on Sunday 14 November 2004, the only exception being Norwich City v Colchester United, which took place on Sunday 21 November 2004.

Tie	Home team (tier)	Score	Away team (tier)	Att.
1	Barnet (3)	9–3	Launton (3)	
2	Cardiff City Bluebirds (3)	8–1	Ross Town (4)	
3	Chesterfield (3)	2–1	Garswood Saints (4)	
4	CEFI (5)	1–3	Lordswood (6)	
5	Crewe Alexandra (3)	2–3 (a.e.t.)	Leeds City Vixens (4)	
6	Doncaster Parklands Rovers (3)	2–4	Newcastle United (3)	
7	Gillingham (3)	0–3	Reading Royals (3)	
8	Ilkeston Town (3)	0–9	Northampton Town (3)	
9	Leafield Athletic (3)	1–0	Bedford Town Bells (3)	
10	Long Eaton Villa (3)	0–1	Leicester City Ladies (3)	

Tie	Home team (tier)	Score	Away team (tier)	Att.
11	Newton Abbot (3)	1–4	Keynsham Town (3)	
12	Nottingham Forest (3)	6–0	Leicester City (4)	
13	Oxford City (3)	2–3	Plymouth Argyle (3)	
14	Preston North End (3)	3–3 (2–4 p)	Blackpool Wren Rovers (3)	
15	Sophtlogic (3)	2–1	Lewes (4)	
16	South Durham Royals (5)	2–3	Chester City (3)	
17	Swindon Town (3)	2–1	Cleveden Town (3)	
18	Thatcham Town (5)	0–4	Queens Park Rangers (3)	
19	West Ham United (3)	4–2	Chesham United (3)	
20	Norwich City (3)	4–3	Colchester United (4)	

== Third round proper ==
The draw was held on Monday 15 November 2004. All matches were played on Sunday 5 December 2004.

Watford won 5–2 against Cardiff City. However, Watford played an ineligible player and the match was awarded to Cardiff City.

Tie	Home team (tier)	Score	Away team (tier)	Att.
1	AFC Wimbledon (2)	2–0	Norwich City (3)	
2	Blackburn Rovers (2)	6–0	Newcastle United (3)	
3	Blackpool Wren Rovers (3)	0–1	Middlesbrough (2)	
4	Cardiff City Bluebirds (3)	6–1	Plymouth Argyle (3)	
5	Chelsea (2)	1–0	Barnet (3)	
6	Leafield Athletic (3)	3–2	Chesterfield (3)	
7	Lordswood (6)	1–6	Ipswich Town (2)	
8	Manchester City (2)	1–2 (a.e.t.)	Sunderland (2)	
9	Millwall Lionesses (2)	1–1 (5–4 p)	Keynsham Town (3)	
10	Nottingham Forest (3)	0–2	Leicester City Ladies (3)	
11	Oldham Curzon (2)	7–1	Leeds City Vixens (4)	

Tie	Home team (tier)	Score	Away team (tier)	Att.
12	Queens Park Rangers (3)	4–1	Enfield Town (2)	
13	Reading Royals (3)	3–1	Brighton & Hove Albion (2)	
14	Sheffield Wednesday (2)	7–1	Lincoln City (2)	
15	Sophtlogic (3)	0–4	Northampton Town (3)	
16	Southampton Saints (2)	0–5	Portsmouth (2)	
17	Stockport County] (2)	2–0	Chester City (3)	
18	Swindon Town (3)	1–2	Langford (2)	
19	Tranmere Rovers (2)	3–1	Aston Villa (2)	
20	Watford (2)	A–W	Cardiff City (2)	
Cardiff City go through. Watford fielded an ineligible player.
21	West Ham United (3)	1–0	Crystal Palace (2)	
22	Wolverhampton Wanderers (2)	5–0	Coventry City (2)	

== Fourth round proper ==
The draw was held on Monday 6 December 2004. All matches were played on Sunday 9 January 2005.

9 January 2005	Arsenal (1)	2–0	AFC Wimbledon (2)	Borehamwood
	Ludlow 67', 72'	Report		Stadium: Meadow Park; Attendance: 110

9 January 2005	Blackburn Rovers (2)	1–4	Leeds United (1)	Brockhall Village
	Goal	Report	Goal	Stadium: Blackburn Rovers Academy

9 January 2005	Bristol City (1)	0–6	Everton (1)	Almondsbury
		Report	Duffy; F. Williams; McDougall; Handley; Evans; Boyle	Stadium: Oaklands Park

9 January 2005	Bristol Rovers (1)	4–0	Stockport County (2)	Mangotsfield
	Goal	Report		Stadium: Cossham Street

9 January 2005	Cardiff City (2)	3–4	Chelsea (2)
	Goal	Report	Langrish 25', 44', 75' (pen.); S. Jones 89'

9 January 2005	Cardiff City Bluebirds (3)	4–5	Millwall Lionesses (2)	Llanrumney
	Goal	Report	Goal	Stadium: Cardiff University of Wales Playing Fields; Referee: R. Tanner

9 January 2005	Charlton Athletic (1)	4–1	Wolverhampton Wanderers (2)	Northfleet
	Broadhurst 2'; Aluko 21'; Heatherson 57'	Report	McCann 43' (pen.)	Stadium: Stonebridge Road

9 January 2005	Doncaster Rovers Belles (1)	1–9	Birmingham City (1)
	Goal	Report	Goal

9 January 2005	Leafield Athletic (3)	1–1 (a.e.t.) (5–4 p)	Northampton Town (3)	Kings Norton
	Goal	Report	Goal	Stadium: Triplex Sports & Social Club
	Penalties
	Penalty scored		Penalty scored Penalty missed

9 January 2005	Leicester City Ladies (3)	0–1	West Ham United (3)	Leicester
		Report	Goal	Stadium: Saffron Lane

9 January 2005	Middlesbrough (2)	0–2	Sheffield Wednesday (2)	Stockton-on-Tees
		Report	Goal	Stadium: Bishopton Road West

9 January 2005	Oldham Curzon (2)	0–1	Fulham (1)	Hyde
		Report	Goal	Stadium: Ewen Fields

9 January 2005	Portsmouth (2)	2–3	Liverpool (1)	Fareham
	Goal	Report	Goal	Stadium: Cams Alders Stadium

9 January 2005	Queens Park Rangers (3)	1–3	Sunderland	Hayes
	Goal	Report	Goal	Stadium: Farm Park; Referee: Mr I Crouch

9 January 2005	Reading Royals (3)	2–1	Ipswich Town (2)
	Goal	Report	Goal

9 January 2005	Tranmere Rovers	3–1	Langford	Heswall
	Goal	Report	Goal	Stadium: Gayton Park; Referee: R Byrne

== Fifth round proper ==
The draw was held on Monday 10 January 2005. All matches were played on Sunday 30 January 2005.

30 January 2005	Bristol Rovers (1)	6–0	Sheffield Wednesday (2)
13:00	T. Williams 2', 37', 78', 84'; Curtis 42'; Holtham 70'	Report

30 January 2005	Charlton Athletic (1)	5–0	West Ham United (3)	Northfleet
13:00	Murphy 13'; Heatherson 20'; Chapman 29'; Smith 71'; Coss 72'	Report		Stadium: Stonebridge Road

30 January 2005	Fulham (1)	1–5	Birmingham City (1)
13:00	Anderson 86'	Report	A. Scott 23', 80'; Carney 67'; Potter 77'; Barr 82'

30 January 2005	Leafield Athletic (3)	0–2	Everton (1)
13:00		Report	F. Williams 20'; Boyle 25'

30 January 2005	Leeds United (1)	1–3	Arsenal (1)	Garforth
13:00	Ward 70'	Report	Fleeting 30'; White 50'; Sanderson 80'	Stadium: Wheatley Park

30 January 2005	Millwall Lionesses (2)	1–3	Tranmere Rovers (2)
13:00	Buckley 57'	Report	Campbell 42'; Mason 64' (o.g.); Kenwright 85'

30 January 2005	Reading Royals (3)	1–3	Chelsea (2)
13:00	C. Williams 54' (pen.)	Report	Langrish 60', 66'; S. Jones 80'

30 January 2005	Sunderland (2)	2–0	Liverpool (1)
13:00	J. Scott 7'; Houghton 21'	Report

== Quarter-finals ==
The draw was held on Monday 31 January 2005. The matches were played on Sunday 13 February 2005, the only exception being Birmingham City v Arsenal, which took place on Sunday 20 February 2005.

13 February 2005	Charlton Athletic (1)	4–1	Sunderland (2)
14:00	Heatherson 7'; Broadhurst 13'; Aluko 89'; Chapman 90'	Report	Stoney 22' (o.g.)

13 February 2005	Chelsea (2)	0–1 (a.e.t.)	Everton (1)	Hampton
14:00		Report	Handley 110'	Stadium: Beveree

13 February 2005	Tranmere Rovers (2)	1–7	Bristol Rovers (1)	Heswall
14:00	K. Jones 75'	Report	Murphy 3', 38'; Holtham 17', 36'; Kveton 20'; Trafford 85'; Hall 88'	Stadium: Gayton Park; Referee: Mr P Tierney

20 February 2005	Birmingham City (1)	0–3	Arsenal (1)	Solihull
14:00		Report	Fleeting 22', 85'; Lacey 39' (o.g.)	Stadium: Damson Park

== Semi-finals ==
All matches were played on Sunday 20 March 2005.

20 March 2005	Everton (1)	3–0	Arsenal (1)	Southport
14:00	F. Williams 44'; Handley 79'; McDougall 85' (pen.)	Report		Stadium: Haig Avenue

20 March 2005	Charlton Athletic (1)	1–0	Bristol Rovers (1)	Dagenham
14:00	Coss 32'	Report		Stadium: Victoria Road

== Final ==
2 May 2005
13:00

Charlton Athletic	1–0	Everton
Aluko 58'	Report

Boleyn Ground, Upton Park
Attendance: 8,567
