= 2007 FA Cup =

2007 FA Cup may refer to:

- 2006–07 FA Cup
  - 2007 FA Cup final
- 2006–07 FA Women's Cup
  - 2007 FA Women's Cup final
- 2007–08 FA Cup
- 2007–08 FA Women's Cup
