= Maria Bertelli =

British footballer and volleyball player (born 1977)

Personal information
- Full name: Maria Catherine Bertelli
- Born: 6 October 1977 (age 49) Ashton-under-Lyne, England
- Height: 171 cm (5 ft 7 in)

Volleyball information
- Position: Setter / Libero

Career
- Years: Team
- 2000–2001 2001–2002: Euphony Tongeren; Asterix Kieldrecht; London Malory; Volley Köniz

National team
- Years: Team
- 1996– 2007–: England; Great Britain
Association football career
- Position: Defender
Youth career
- Stockport
Senior career*
Years	Team	Apps	(Gls)
2002–2005	Wimbledon		
2005–2007	Charlton Athletic		
- * Club domestic league appearances and goals

Maria Catherine Bertelli (born 6 October 1977) is a British former volleyball player and footballer, and volleyball coach. She competed for the Great Britain volleyball team at the 2012 Summer Olympics.

== Football career ==
Bertelli played football for Wimbledon and Charlton Athletic in the FA Women's Premier League. In 2005, she was signed by Charlton coach Keith Boanas. That season she played in Charlton's 2–1 Premier League Cup final win over Arsenal. In 2006–07 Charlton were beaten 4–1 by quadruple-winning Arsenal in the FA Women's Cup final, before a record crowd of 24,529 at the City Ground in Nottingham. Bertelli was booked for an early foul on Kelly Smith.

When Charlton Athletic men's team were relegated in 2007 they disbanded their women's team. Bertelli made public her disappointment: "To call it upsetting is an understatement."

== Volleyball career ==
Bertelli started playing volleyball at the age of 13. After graduating from Loughborough University, Bartelli played volleyball professionally in Belgium, but soon returned to England, despite having to pay to play for the national team at the time.

After the disbandment of Charlton Athletic's women's team, Bartelli decided to focus on volleyball, joining Great Britain's national training programme in Sheffield in preparation for the 2012 London Olympics. The team relied on support from family, friends, and supporters to make it to the Olympics after their lottery funding was cut.

Bartelli went on to become a volleyball coach, directing teams including Darkstar Derbyshire before being appointed head coach of England's senior women's team in 2018.
