= 2003 FA Women's Community Shield =

Annual football match

2003 Women's FA Community Shield
Doncaster Rovers Belles	Fulham
0	1
- Date: 6 August 2003
- Venue: Field Mill, Mansfield
- Player of the Match: Layla Young (Doncaster Rovers Belles)
- Referee: Mr P Cottam
- Attendance: 1,642

The 2003 Women's FA Community Shield was the fourth Women's FA Community Shield, as with its male equivalent, the Community Shield is an annual football match played between the winners of the previous season's league and the previous season's Women's FA Cup. The match was contested between Fulham and Doncaster Rovers Belles. Fulham won 1–0.

== Match ==
=== Details ===
6 August 2003
19:45 BST

Doncaster Rovers Belles	0–1	Fulham
	Report	Unitt 80'

Field Mill, Mansfield
Attendance: 1,642
Referee: Mr P Cottam

Doncaster Rovers Belles	Fulham

GK	(England) Layla Young
DF	(England) Carly Hunt
DF	(England) Mandy Lowe
DF	(England) Claire Utley
DF	Gemma McCool
MF	(England) Gail Borman	(substituted off) 54'
MF	(England) Becky Easton
MF	(England) Vicky Exley
MF	(England) Gemma Hunt
FW	(England) Jody Handley
FW	(England) Karen Walker
Substitutes:
GK	Samantha Newton
DF	Sarah Slater
DF	Nicola Devine
	Suzanne Smith	(substituted on) 54'
	B. Drewery
Manager:
(Scotland) John Buckley

GK	(England) Siobhan Chamberlain
DF	(England) Kim Jerry-Silver
DF	(England) Mary Phillip
DF	(England) Corrine Yorston
DF	(England) Rachel Unitt
MF	(England) Gemma Ritchie
MF	(England) Rachel McArthur
MF	(England) Katie Chapman
MF	(England) Michelle Hickmott	(substituted off) 72'
FW	(England) Tammy Waine
FW	(England) Rachel Yankey
Substitutes:
GK	(England) Holly Cox
DF	(England) Jessica Wright	(substituted on) 72'
MF	(England) Sancia Duncan
FW	(England) Chantelle White
FW	(England) Danielle Bird
Manager:
(England) Marieanne Spacey
