= Karen Hills (footballer) =

English footballer

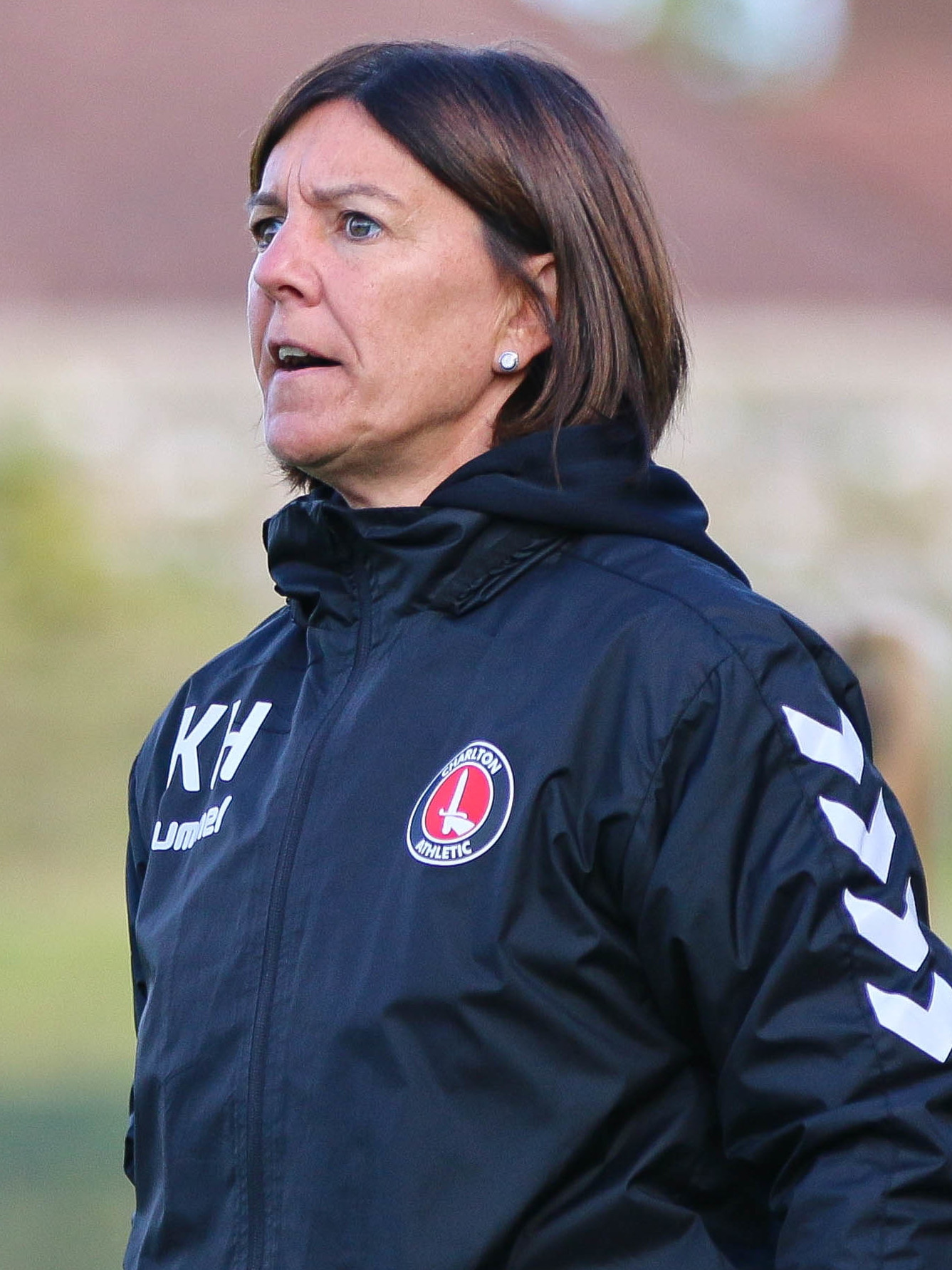
- With Charlton Athletic in October 2021

Personal information
- Date of birth: 5 May 1975 (age 51)
- Height: 1.62 m (5 ft 4 in)
- Position: Defender

Team information
- Current team: Charlton Athletic

Senior career*
Years	Team	Apps	(Gls)
- Watford
- Wembley Mill Hill
2001–2007	Charlton Athletic		

Managerial career
- 2009–2020: Tottenham Hotspur
- 2021–: Charlton Athletic
- * Club domestic league appearances and goals

Karen Hills (born 5 May 1975) is an English football manager and former player who currently manages Women's Super League club Charlton Athletic.

== Playing career ==
After playing at primary school, Hills drifted away from football until she joined a leisure centre at 18 years old and was persuaded to play for Watford who scouted her at an informal "kickabout". She was deployed as a forward and scored a hat-trick on her debut, before moving back into midfield and eventually into defence. She later moved to Wembley Mill Hill, where she served as captain.

In January 2000 Hills and Mill Hill team mate Laura Burns tested positive for cannabis in a random drug test carried out by The Football Association. Both received six-month suspensions.

Hills joined top-flight Charlton Athletic for the 2001–02 FA Women's Premier League season. Keith Boanas named her his Manager's Player of the Season in her debut campaign, as she came to be seen as an "experienced and quick centre-back who reads the game well".

With Charlton Athletic Hills reached the FA Women's Cup final four times in five years, winning once when they beat Everton in 2005. They lost to Fulham in 2003 and to Arsenal in 2004 and 2007. She also collected FA Women's Premier League Cup and FA Women's Community Shield winner's medals in 2004.

== Coaching career ==
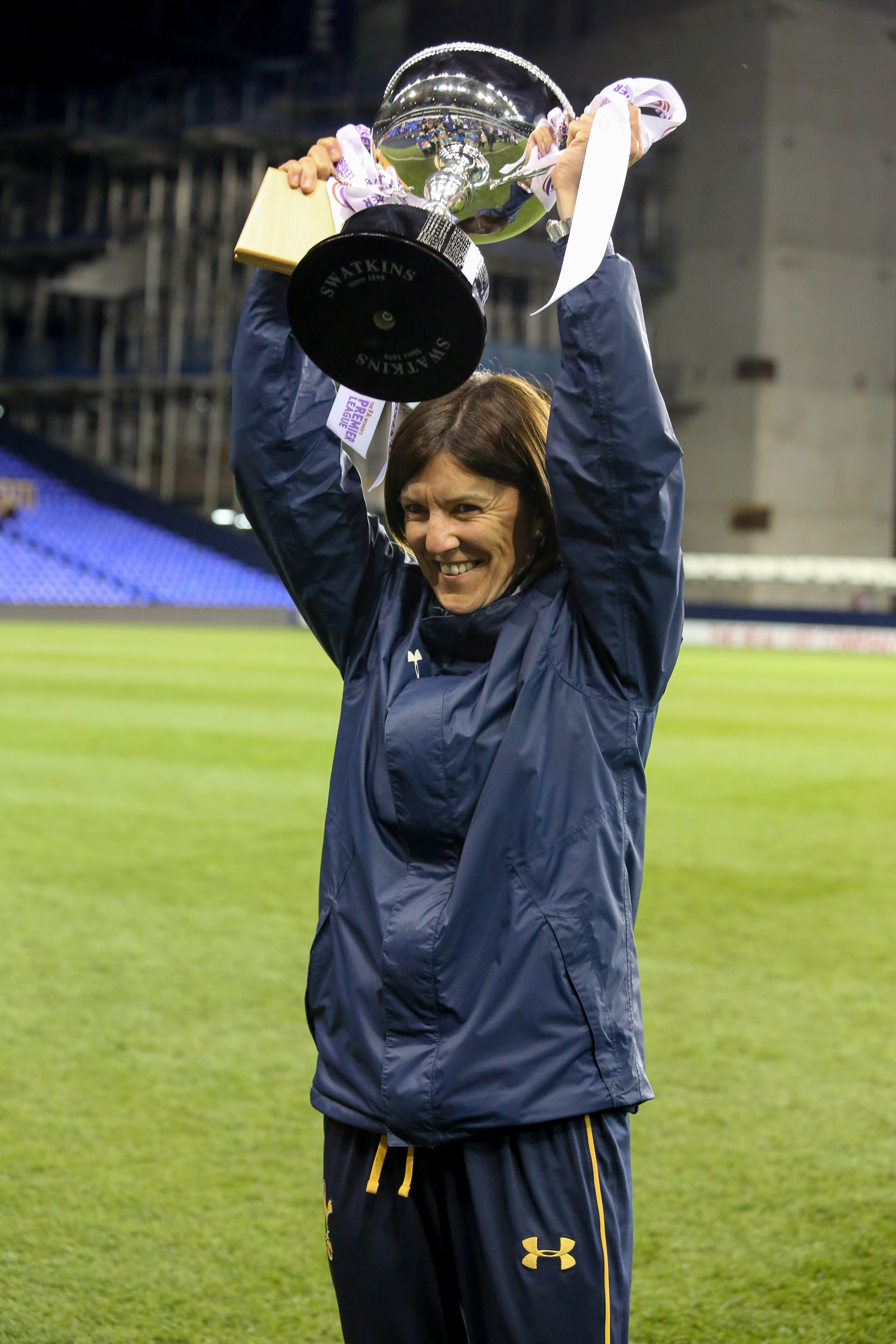
At White Hart Lane in April 2017

Hills served as assistant coach to her friend Tracey Kevins at Barnet for two seasons.

In August 2009 she was appointed first team manager at Tottenham Hotspur, where she was already working as the club's women's and girls' development officer. Over the following decade, Hills presided over a series of promotions as the club developed from a completely amateur South East Combination Women's Football League team to a full-time professional FA Women's Super League outfit, playing in front of record-breaking crowds. On 19 November 2020 Hills and joint head coach Juan Carlos Amorós were sacked.

On 16 March 2021, Hills was appointed manager of FA Women's Championship side Charlton Athletic, taking over from Riteesh Mishra who remained at the club in a coaching capacity. On 22 August 2023, she signed a new two year contract with the club. On 8 December 2023, Hills was named Barclays Women's Championship Manager of the Month for November. On 9 February 2024, she was named Barclays Women's Championship Manager of the Month for January. On 11 October 2024, Hills was named the BWC Manager of the Month for September 2024. On 13 August 2025, she signed a contract extension with the club.

== Coaching honours ==
Tottenham Hotspur

- FA Women's Premier League: Championship play-off: 2016–17
- FA Women's Premier League Southern Division: 2016–17
- FA South-East Combination: 2010–11
- Ryman's Women's Cup: 2015–16, 2016–17
- FA Women's Premier League Cup: 2015–16, 2016–17

Charlton Athletic

- Women's Super League 2 play-off: 2025–26

Individual

- Women's Super League Manager of the Month: September 2019
- FA Women's Championship Manager of the Month: September 2018, January 2019, January 2024, September 2024
- Women's Super League 2 Manager of the Month: January 2025, November 2025
- Women's Super League 2 Manager of the Year: 2025–26
