= Denise Campbell (footballer) =

English footballer

Personal information
- Date of birth: 15 October 1979 (age 47)
- Place of birth: Liverpool, England
- Position: Midfielder

Youth career
- Tranmere Rovers Ladies

Senior career*
Years	Team	Apps	(Gls)
1994–2006	Tranmere Rovers Ladies		
2006–2012	Blackburn Rovers Ladies		
2015–2017	Tranmere Rovers Ladies		
- * Club domestic league appearances and goals as of 15:15, 17 February 2019 (UTC)

Denise Campbell (born 15 October 1979) is an English footballer. She played as a midfielder in the FA Women's Premier League National Division for Tranmere Rovers Ladies and Blackburn Rovers Ladies. She was born in Liverpool.

== Club career ==
Campbell captained Tranmere Rovers Ladies before leaving to join Blackburn in the 2006 close season. She scored on her home debut with a free-kick from 35 yards out as Rovers drew 1–1 at home to Leeds United Ladies. In August 2015 Campbell agreed to rejoin Tranmere Rovers.

== Blackburn statistics ==
To 28 October 2009

Club	Season	League		WFA Cup		Premier League Cup		County Cup		Other		Total	
Club	Season	Apps	Goals	Apps	Goals	Apps	Goals	Apps	Goals	Apps	Goals	Apps	Goals
Blackburn Rovers Ladies	2006–07	19	1	4	0	2	0	2	0	0	0	27	1
Blackburn Rovers Ladies	2007–08	21	1	3	1	2	0	4	2	0	0	30	4
Blackburn Rovers Ladies	2008–09	17	0	2	0	2	0	3	1	0	0	24	1
Blackburn Rovers Ladies	2009–10	4	0	0	0	1	0	0	0	0	0	5	0
Career total		61	2	9	1	6	0	9	3	0	0	86	6
