= Eni Aluko =

British-Nigerian footballer (born 1987)

Eniola Aluko MBE
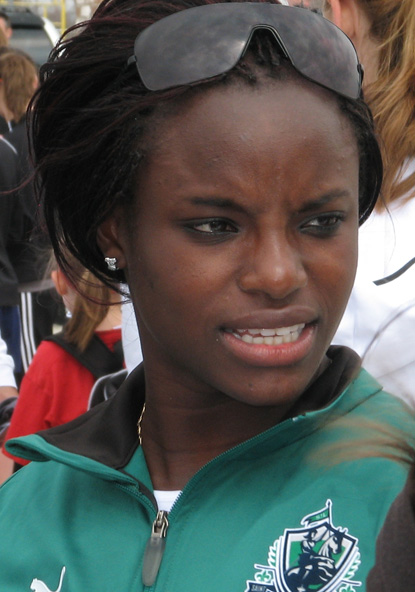
- Aluko with Saint Louis Athletica in 2009

Personal information
- Date of birth: 21 February 1987 (age 39)
- Place of birth: Lagos, Nigeria
- Height: 5 ft 3 in (1.59 m)
- Position: Forward

Youth career
- Leafield Athletic

Senior career*
Years	Team	Apps	(Gls)
2001–2004	Birmingham City		
2004–2007	Charlton Athletic		
2008–2009	Chelsea	28	(15)
2009–2010	Saint Louis Athletica	25	(10)
2010	Atlanta Beat	14	(5)
2011	Sky Blue FC	15	(4)
2012	Birmingham City	13	(4)
2012–2018	Chelsea	73	(32)
2018–2019	Juventus	27	(15)

International career
2004–2016	England	102	(33)
2012	Great Britain	5	(0)
Medal record
Women's football
Representing England
FIFA Women's World Cup
Bronze medal – third place	2015
- * Club domestic league appearances and goals

Eniola "Eni" Aluko MBE (born 21 February 1987) is a British-Nigerian football executive, football broadcaster and former professional player, who played as a winger and striker. She was the first sporting director for Angel City FC of the National Women's Soccer League (NWSL) and was sporting director at Women's Super League (WSL) club Aston Villa from January 2020 to June 2021.

Born in Lagos, Nigeria, Aluko moved to Birmingham in England at 6 months old and made 102 appearances for the England national team from 2004 to 2016. She competed at the 2007 FIFA Women's World Cup in China, UEFA Women's Euro 2009, 2011 FIFA Women's World Cup in Germany, UEFA Women's Euro 2013, and 2015 FIFA Women's World Cup in Canada. At the 2012 Summer Olympics in London, she represented Great Britain for team GB women's football.

Aluko played for Birmingham City, Charlton Athletic, and Chelsea in England's FA Women's Premier League. She played for Saint Louis Athletica, Atlanta Beat, and Sky Blue FC in the American Women's Professional Soccer (WPS) from 2009 to 2011. After a short stint with Birmingham in England's new top division, the FA WSL, she signed with Chelsea, where she played from 2012 to 2018. Before retiring in January 2020, Aluko last played for Juventus.

Since 2014, she has also provided television commentary on football, including FIFA men's and women's World Cups. Aluko has been a broadcaster for live football on ITV, BT Sport, Amazon Prime and Fox Sports in the U.S., including men's Premier League and WSL matches. She was the first female footballer to make an appearance on Match of the Day. In 2023, she joined multi-club ownership group Mercury/13 as a founding investor and advisor.

== Early life ==
Born in Lagos, Nigeria, to Yoruba parents Gbenga and Sileola Aluko, Aluko moved with her family to Birmingham in the West Midlands region of England at the age of six months. She grew up playing football with her brother Sone Aluko and his friends. She also played other sports, including tennis. Growing up, Aluko supported Manchester United.

Aluko started her career at Leafield Athletic Ladies and subsequently played for Birmingham City Ladies' youth team under manager Marcus Bignot with England. She scored on her Birmingham team debut against Leeds United, aged 14.

== Club career ==
=== Birmingham City, 2001–2004 ===
On 7 April 2002, 15-year-old Aluko played for Birmingham City Ladies in the FA Women's Premier League Cup final at Adams Park, as the young Birmingham team lost 7–1 to professional Fulham. City did win promotion as Northern Division champions to the Premier League National Division in 2001–02. Her goalscoring during the following 2002–03 Premier League season led Bignot and the media to declare her "the Wayne Rooney of women's football".

Aluko was named Young Player of the Year at The FA Women's Football Awards in 2003.

=== Charlton Athletic, 2004–2007 ===
Aluko left Birmingham to join Charlton Athletic in January 2004. She helped Charlton defeat Fulham 1–0 to win the FA Women's Premier League Cup at Underhill Stadium in March 2004.

During the 2003–04 season, Aluko appeared as a second-half substitute when Charlton lost the FA Women's Cup final to Arsenal, 3–0 at Loftus Road in May. Charlton also lost the Premier League National Division title to Arsenal on the last day of the season, having led the way for most of the season.

Aluko lifted the FA Women's Community Shield with Charlton in August 2004 after helping the team win. Her 41st minute set-up for Ann-Marie Heatherson provided the winner in a 1–0 victory over Arsenal at Broadhall Way.

Pace was considered one of her attributes and this was evident when she sprinted onto a through ball from Emma Coss to score the winning goal in the 2005 FA Women's Cup final at Upton Park. Charlton beat Everton 1–0 in the final. Aluko scored two goals in the first half of Charlton's 2–1 victory over Arsenal in the 2006 FA Women's Premier League Cup final at Adams Park.

Aluko also played in the 2005 FA Women's Community Shield (4–0 defeat at the National Hockey Stadium), the 2005 FA Women's Premier League Cup final (3–0 defeat at Griffin Park), and the 2007 FA Women's Cup final (4–1 defeat at the City Ground), All three defeats were inflicted by Arsenal. Her assist to Katie Holtham in the second minute of the match gave Charlton the lead in the 2007 FA Women's Cup final. She also won the London FA Women's Cup with Charlton twice, in 2005 and 2006.

=== Chelsea, 2007–2009 ===
Following the withdrawal of support for the Charlton women's team by the parent club, Aluko joined Chelsea Ladies in July 2007.

=== WPS, 2009–2011 ===
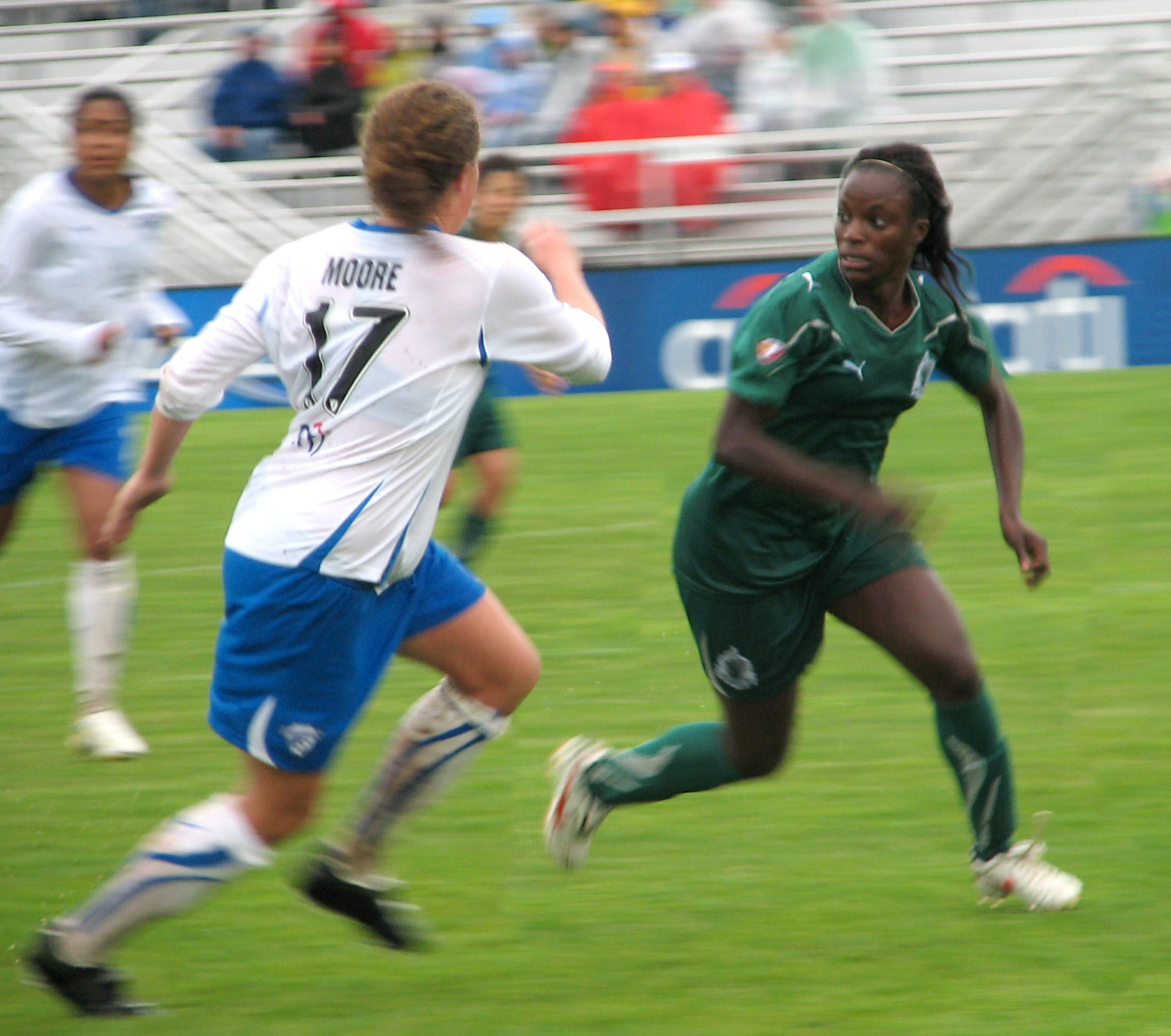
Aluko playing against the Boston Breakers

In October 2008, Aluko's playing rights were obtained by St. Louis Athletica who named her as a post-draft discovery player. She was the team's leading goal scorer during the league's inaugural season with six goals, and also led in assists with four, making her one of the main reasons Athletica was able to climb from a last place in the first two months of the season to a commanding second by the end. She missed the playoffs and the All-Star match due to national team duty.

When Saint Louis Athletica folded part way through the 2010 season, Aluko signed with Atlanta Beat. She was later traded to Sky Blue FC in December 2010.

=== Birmingham City, 2012 ===
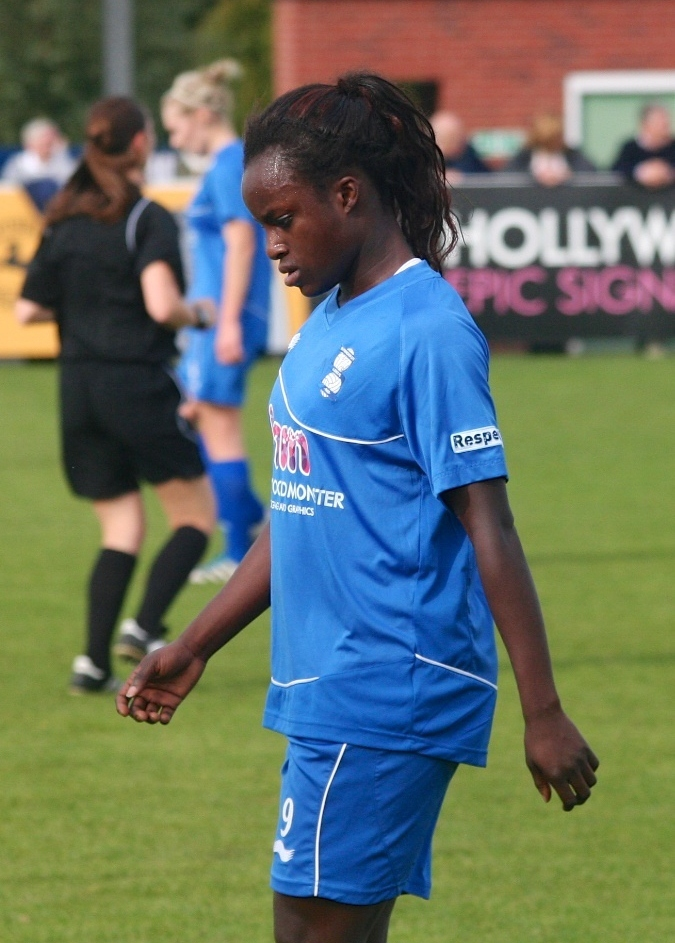
Aluko with Birmingham City in October 2012

When the WPS went into abeyance for the 2012 season, Aluko had already decided to return to England. She signed for Birmingham City, describing them as "more stable".

In 2012, Aluko registered five goals and two assists in 17 FA WSL League and Cup appearances, as Birmingham finished runners up to Arsenal in both competitions. City lost the 2012 FA WSL Cup Final to Arsenal 1–0 at Underhill Stadium on 10 October 2012. Birmingham did defeat Chelsea 3–2 on penalties, after it was 2–2 at the end of extra time, in the 2012 FA Women's Cup final on 26 May 2012 at Ashton Gate to win the club's first major honour in its 44-year history. Aluko was introduced as a 63rd-minute substitute.

=== Chelsea, 2012–2018 ===
After a single season at Birmingham, she re-signed for Chelsea in December 2012. In her first season with the club, Aluko contributed six goals and three assists in 17 FA WSL League and Cup matches. Having had a poor season domestically, Chelsea reached the final of the invitational 2013 International Women's Club Championship, but lost 4–2 to INAC Kobe Leonessa. Aluko registered an assist in the Final and scored in the semi-final win against Sydney FC.

In 2014, Aluko scored seven times and provided one assist in 20 FA WSL League and Cup appearances. Aluko's Chelsea began the last day of the 2014 FA WSL season top of the league, two points ahead of Birmingham City and three points ahead of Liverpool, but a 2–1 defeat at Manchester City cost Chelsea the Super League title on goal difference.

Aluko was one of six nominations for the 2014–15 PFA Women's Players' Player of the Year, but lost out to her Chelsea teammate Ji So-yun. She did win Chelsea Ladies' Player of the Year for the 2014–15 season and was selected in the 2015 PFA WSL Team of the Year.

In 2015, Aluko played in the first FA Women's Cup final held at Wembley Stadium on 1 August 2015 in front of a record attendance of 30,710. Her Chelsea team defeated Notts County 1–0 to win the club's first major trophy in its history. Individually, Aluko was at the heart of Chelsea's win as she put in a Player-of-the-Match performance and provided the assist for Ji's 39th-minute winner. That same year she and Chelsea also went on to win their first WSL title.

It was announced on 16 May 2018 that Aluko would receive a free transfer from Chelsea when the 2017–18 season ended four days later. She marked her final appearance by scoring and had made occasional appearances, predominantly as a late substitute, in the side which remained unbeaten throughout the whole league season.

=== Juventus, 2018–2019 ===
Aluko signed for Serie A club Juventus on 6 June 2018. Aluko finished as the top scorer for Juventus in her first season in Italy, winning the Coppa Italia title and the league title.

In November 2019, Aluko announced that she would be leaving Juventus after 18 months at the club, stating her time at the club had been one of "great success and lots of learning." She returned to Britain in December, having also won the Supercoppa Italiana the previous month. However, she spoke about negative experiences in the city, calling it "decades behind" and saying she had been made to feel like Pablo Escobar on occasions at Turin airport. On 15 January 2020, Aluko announced her retirement from professional football.

== International career ==
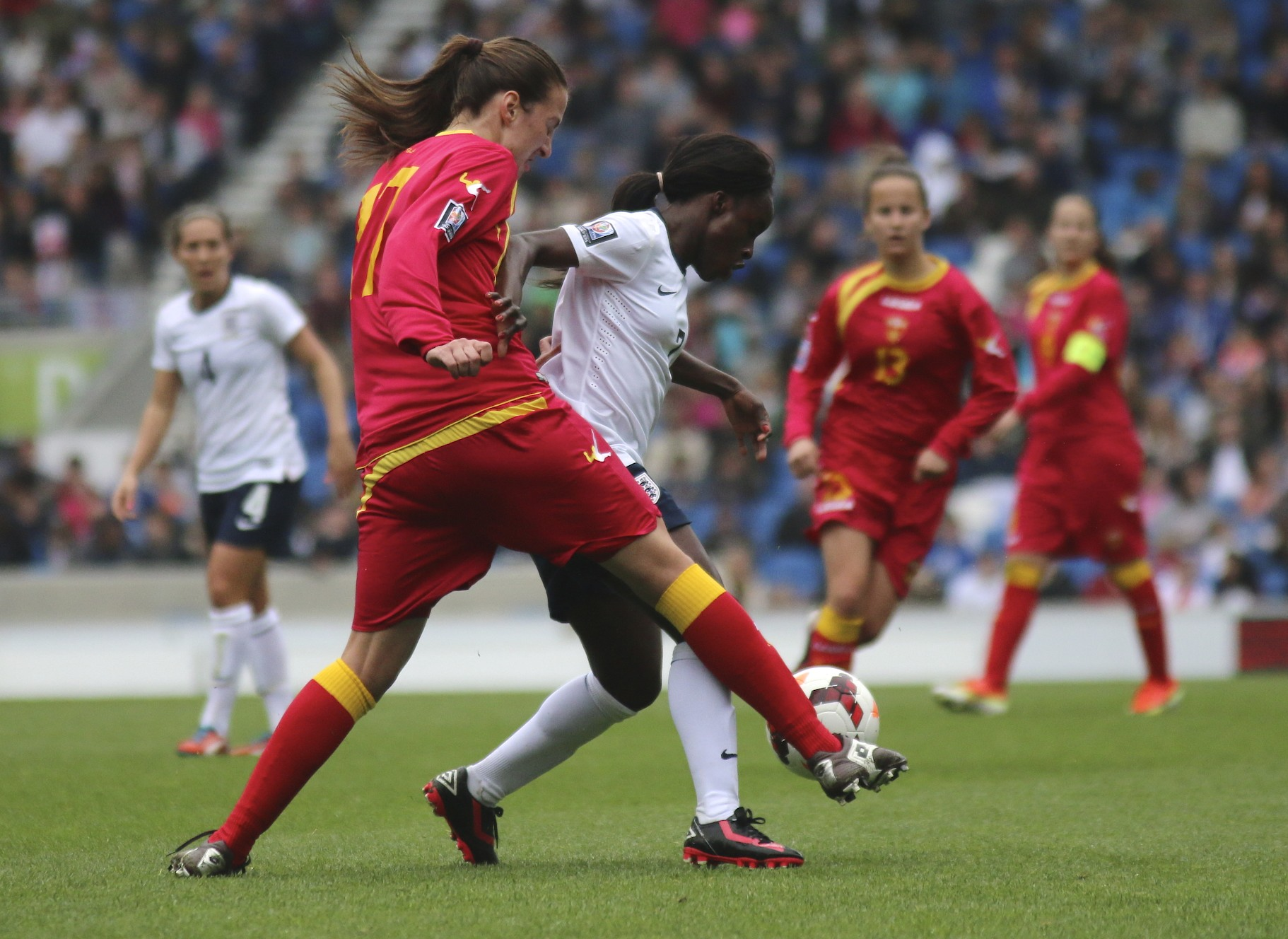
Aluko playing against Montenegro, April 2014

=== England ===
Aluko was called into the England set-up as a 14-year-old. She chose to remain loyal to the English coaches who had given her the opportunity to play international football, but said: "The main thing for me is for people to understand that choosing to play for England doesn't mean that I don't support Nigeria. I'm as much Nigerian as I'm British. Of course Nigeria means a lot to me, it's part of me, but I've been brought up by English coaches."

Having represented England at Under-17 level, Aluko scored on her debut at Under-19 level and appeared in the UEFA Under-19 European Championship Finals in Germany in July 2003 while aged only 16 years. She later played at Under-21 level, before making her senior debut, aged 17, against the Netherlands in September 2004. Her first senior goal came against the Czech Republic at Walsall in May 2005, and she added two more in the 13–0 away win against Hungary that October.

Aluko played in UEFA Women's Euro 2005, despite a clash with her A-Level studies. She sat a history exam on the morning of England's 2–1 defeat to Denmark. In the final group game against Sweden, Aluko almost scored a bizarre equaliser, but was left disappointed as hosts England lost 1–0 and exited the competition.

At the 2007 FIFA Women's World Cup, Aluko featured in group matches against Japan and Argentina, as well as the 3–0 quarter-final defeat by the United States. After the tournament, she was critical of The Football Association and the level of financial support provided to England's top female players. Aluko featured much more prominently at UEFA Women's Euro 2009, scoring in the group match win over Russia and adding two more in the quarter-final victory over hosts Finland. She also provided an assist for Kelly Smith's opening goal in the semi-final against the Netherlands. In the final, Aluko played on the left-wing as England were mauled 6–2 by Germany in Helsinki.

Aluko scored against Switzerland in September 2010 as England qualified for the 2011 FIFA Women's World Cup. During the final tournament, Aluko responded to public criticism of her performance in the 1–1 draw with Mexico, in which she failed to convert multiple goalscoring opportunities. She was substituted at half–time in the following group match against New Zealand, and dropped to the bench for the final group match with Japan, playing the last half an hour of England's 2–0 win. Aluko was an unused substitute as England were eliminated by France at the quarter final stage.

As England qualified for the 2015 FIFA Women's World Cup, Aluko finished as the joint-top scorer in qualifying with 13 goals, which included her first hat-trick in a 10–0 thumping of Montenegro, and braces against Turkey and Ukraine. At the tournament, Aluko started both of England's first two group matches, a 1–0 defeat by France and a 2–1 win over Mexico. Having missed the last group match and the knockout stages, Aluko reappeared as a 61st-minute substitute in the third-place play-off with Germany. England defeated Germany for the very first time, 1–0 after extra time to win bronze medals.

Aluko was not called up to the national team after May 2016, following a confidential review of England team culture where she raised issues of racist statements by Mark Sampson made to her and England teammate Drew Spence. According to a report in The Times from 2017, Aluko had been dropped after a report found she had repeatedly engaged in "disruptive" behaviour. She was paid around £60,000 by the Football Association in an employment tribunal settlement for loss of future earnings. The Football Association later publicly apologised to Aluko at the select committee hearing of the Department of Culture, Media and Sport (with some DCMS MPs calling for relevant FA officials to resign over their handling of the case), after the same barrister found racist remarks were made to her and Spence, following a third investigation. Sampson later apologised to Aluko over the comments, which were characterised by the inquiry as "ill-judged attempts at humour".

When England's entire team—led by black forward Nikita Parris—pointedly ran to celebrate with Sampson after scoring in their next match against Russia, Aluko publicly criticised her former team-mates, accusing them of selfishness, lacking respect and requiring diversity training. Parris later apologised to Aluko in an open letter in June 2020 admitting that the celebration with Sampson was a "thoughtless action" that showed a lack of empathy, understanding and ignorance given that Sampson was under investigation for making racially discriminatory remarks to Aluko and Spence for which the FA later apologised.

In an interview with The Daily Telegraph, England right-back Lucy Bronze questioned whether Aluko was now good enough to be in England's squad. Aluko remained surprised and disappointed at a perceived lack of support for her position from England's current players. Sampson's successor as England coach, Phil Neville, did not select Aluko either.

Aluko was given number 154 when the FA announced their legacy numbers scheme to honour the 50th anniversary of England's inaugural international.

==== International goals for England ====
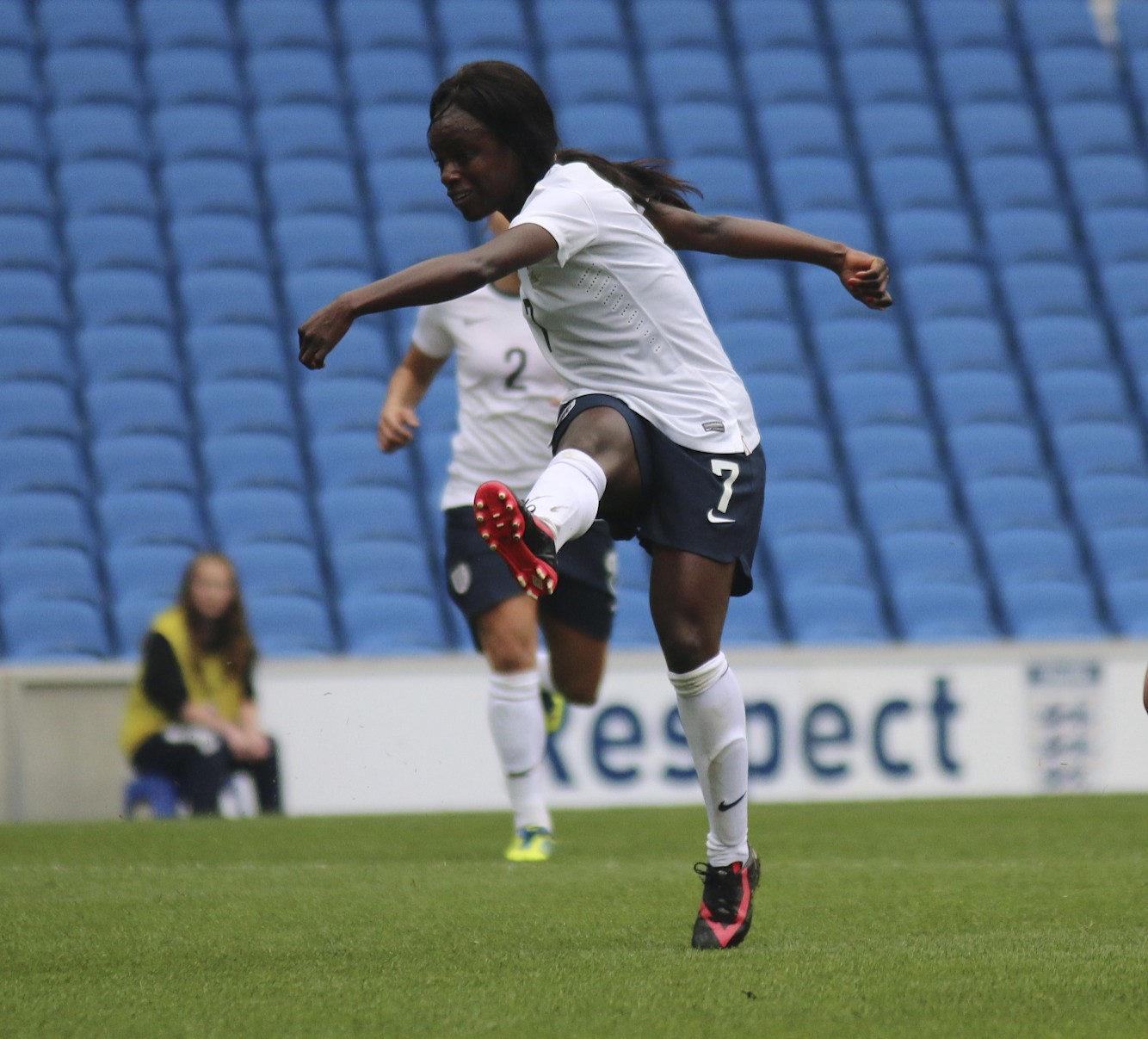
Aluko in 2014

Scores and results list England's goal tally first.

#	Date	Venue	Opponent	Result	Competition	Scored
1	26 May 2005	Bescot Stadium, Walsall	Czech Republic	4–1	Friendly	1
3	27 October 2005	Tapolcia Stadium, Tapolca	Hungary	13–0	2007 FIFA World Cup qualifying	2
4	8 March 2007	National Hockey Stadium, Milton Keynes	Russia	6–0	Friendly	1
5	27 October 2007	Bescot Stadium, Walsall	Belarus	4–0	UEFA Women's Euro 2009 qualifying	1
6	10 March 2009	GSZ Stadium, Larnaca	Scotland	3–0	2009 Cyprus Cup	1
7	28 August 2009	Finnair Stadium, Helsinki	Russia	3–2	UEFA Women's Euro 2009	1
9	3 September 2009	Veritas Stadion, Turku	Finland	3–2	UEFA Women's Euro 2009	2
10	22 March 2010	Loftus Road, London	Austria	3–0	2011 FIFA World Cup qualifying	1
11	16 September 2010	Stadion Niedermatten, Wohlen	Switzerland	3–2	2011 FIFA World Cup qualifying	1
12	19 September 2012	Bescot Stadium, Walsall	Croatia	3–0	UEFA Women's Euro 2013 qualifying	1
13	11 March 2013	GSZ Stadium, Larnaca	New Zealand	3–1	2013 Cyprus Cup	1
14	26 June 2013	Pirelli Stadium, Burton	Japan	1–1	Friendly	1
15	12 July 2013	Arena Linköping, Linköping	Spain	2–3	UEFA Women's Euro 2013	1
16	21 September 2013	Dean Court, Bournemouth	Belarus	6–0	2015 FIFA World Cup qualifying	1
18	26 September 2013	Fratton Park, Portsmouth	Turkey	8–0	2015 FIFA World Cup qualifying	2
19	31 October 2013	5 Ocak Stadium, Adana	Turkey	4–0	2015 FIFA World Cup qualifying	1
20	17 January 2014	La Manga Stadium, La Manga Club	Norway	1–1	Friendly	1
21	2 March 2014	GSZ Stadium, Larnaca	Finland	3–0	2014 Cyprus Cup	1
22	5 April 2014	Falmer Stadium, Brighton and Hove	Montenegro	9–0	2015 FIFA World Cup qualifying	1
24	8 May 2014	Greenhous Meadow, Shrewsbury	Ukraine	4–0	2015 FIFA World Cup qualifying	2
25	14 June 2014	Traktar Stadium, Minsk	Belarus	3–0	2015 FIFA World Cup qualifying	1
26	19 June 2014	Arena Lviv, Lviv	Ukraine	2–1	2015 FIFA World Cup qualifying	1
27	21 August 2014	Cardiff City Stadium, Cardiff	Wales	4–0	2015 FIFA World Cup qualifying	1
30	17 September 2014	Stadion Pod Malim Brdom, Petrovac	Montenegro	10–0	2015 FIFA World Cup qualifying	3
31	4 March 2015	GSZ Stadium, Larnaca	Finland	3–1	2015 Cyprus Cup	1
32	9 March 2015	GSP Stadium, Nicosia	Netherlands	1–1	2015 Cyprus Cup	1
33	23 October 2015	Yongchuan Sports Center, Chongqing	China	1–2	Dewellbon Cup	1

=== Great Britain ===
==== 2012 Olympics ====
In June 2012, Aluko was named in the 18-player Great Britain squad for the 2012 London Olympics. She made her Great Britain debut, in its first ever official fixture, in a friendly goalless draw with Sweden at the Riverside Stadium, Middlesbrough on 20 July 2012, starting and playing the entire match.

At the Olympic football tournament, Aluko started all three groups matches, which included wins over New Zealand, Cameroon and in front of over 70,000 at Wembley, twice Olympic silver-medalists Brazil. Aluko won a penalty in the Brazil match, which Kelly Smith missed. Britain advanced to the quarter-finals as group winners. Aluko also started as Britain lost 2–0 to Canada in the quarter-finals, courtesy of two early goals, and ended hopes of at least reaching a match for an opportunity at a medal. Aluko had a strong appeal for a second-half penalty dismissed.

==== 2016 Olympics ====
Despite England's third-place finish at the 2015 FIFA Women's World Cup, which Aluko was a part of, earning Great Britain one of the three available European slots for the 2016 Rio Olympics, it was already decided Great Britain would not send a women's team to the event. It meant Aluko did not add to her tally of five Great Britain caps, with participation at the 2020 Tokyo Olympics the next earliest available opportunity.

== Executive career ==
In January 2020, Aluko was appointed Aston Villa Women's first sporting director shortly after retiring from professional football. In the role, she oversaw the club's women's football operations following their promotion ambitions and subsequent development within the English women's game.

In May 2021, Aluko was appointed the inaugural sporting director of Angel City FC, a National Women's Soccer League expansion club based in Los Angeles. She joined the club after leaving Aston Villa and was tasked with helping establish the team's football operations ahead of its debut NWSL season.

In April 2024, Aluko made history by becoming the first African woman to make the board of Italy's female top-flight football club FC Como Women as part of Mercury 13, an investment group focused on the development of women's football clubs.

In July 2024, Aluko launched a £60,000 scholarship in conjunction with Brunel University of London (BUL), supporting the next generation of lawyers and sports people in their studies and career development. The scholarship will be spread across two years and contribute towards the tuition fees, travel expenses and competitions for five law students and 10 sports students. Aluko has also partnered with Adidas for recipients to receive sponsored kit from the sportswear brand.

== Personal life ==
While playing for England during UEFA Women's Euro 2005, Aluko took her A-Levels at Cadbury College, Birmingham. She subsequently went to study law at Brunel University, where she graduated with a first class degree in 2008. In July 2009 it was announced that Aluko would spend the 2009–10 US off-season studying for the New York bar exam before taking a similar exam in England, her aim being to have an entertainment law practice in both England and the United States.

While completing an accelerated Legal Practice Course at the University of Law, Aluko had traineeships at Lee & Thompson LLP and Onside Law. She announced her intention to "step back" from her legal career in March 2015 to focus on playing professional football. In 2016, The Football Association informed Aluko that her paid consultancy role with a sports agency breached their rules and was under investigation by the Association's integrity unit. Aluko alleged that the investigation by the Football Association was retaliatory because it was raised at the same time as her request for the racism of the England coach Mark Sampson to be investigated by the Football Association. She began working as an associate consultant for Slaughter and May, before resigning when she moved to Italy to play for Juventus.

Her younger brother Sone is a retired footballer who is a first-team coach at Ipswich Town and was an England youth international, but in May 2009 accepted a call-up to represent Nigeria. Her father is a former MP in Nigeria.

Aluko voted for the Conservative Party in the 2019 general elections but has publicly stated that she is a liberal that has no staunch allegiance to any political party. Her Christianity was strengthened under the influence of born again former footballer Linvoy Primus. Aluko was also listed in the 2020 Powerlist, recognition as being one of the 100 most influential Black Britons.

Aluko stated that structural barriers affected pathways for women in coaching, noting the under-representation of women in coaching positions within professional football. In 2024, FIFA introduced a requirement for national women's teams to include at least one female coach as part of their coaching staff.

In May 2020, Aluko published a series of tweets that appeared to criticise people placed on the UK government's furlough scheme introduced in response to the pandemic of COVID-19, subsequently deleting most of the messages, apologising and stating her support for the furlough scheme.

In October 2022, Aluko was one of the first women inducted into the WSL Hall of Fame by the Football Association.

Aluko was appointed Member of the Order of the British Empire (MBE) in the 2023 Birthday Honours for services to association football and charity.

== In popular culture ==
In September 2014, Aluko appeared on the BBC's football programme Match of the Day, the first woman to appear as a pundit on the show. At UEFA Women's Euro 2017, Aluko worked as a pundit for Channel 4. She provided commentary for ITV's coverage of the 2018 FIFA World Cup and for Fox Sports' coverage of the 2019 FIFA Women's World Cup. In 2015, Aluko posed nude in a photoshoot for Sport magazine in celebration of her athletic body.

She was featured along with her national teammates in the EA Sports' FIFA video game series starting in FIFA 16, the first time women players were included in the game.

In August 2016, she signed a multi-year endorsement deal with Under Armour, the first UK woman athlete to do so. In January 2020 Aluko became an Adidas ambassador on a multi-year deal.

Aluko released her autobiography They don't teach this – Lessons in the game of life in August 2019.

In 2021, Aluko appeared in Season 2 of Ted Lasso as a character called Georgia.

In March 2023, Aluko appeared on Soccer AM alongside professional boxer and former Love Island contestant Tommy Fury for the "Pro AM" challenge; despite Fury’s limited footballing background, he converted one of his attempts, while Aluko did not score during the segment.

== Controversies and legal disputes ==
In 2023, Aluko was criticised for her suggestion that Arsenal manager Mikel Arteta and Manchester City manager Pep Guardiola would have communicated about the transfer bids for Declan Rice. Aluko claimed such communication between Arteta and Guardiola as close friends and colleagues who have repeatedly admitted their private communications would have been inevitable and is part of transfer tactics and business communications between rival clubs.

Aluko has made repeated attacks on the football commentator Ian Wright since 2025, accusing him of not supporting her, and criticising his placement as a pundit of women's football, arguing that women should have priority in commentating the women's game. Aluko originally apologised for her initial comments, which Wright refused to accept.

In November 2025, Joey Barton was found guilty at Liverpool Crown Court of sending grossly offensive electronic communications with intent to cause distress or anxiety to Aluko. The case related to a series of posts made on X between January and March 2024, which included derogatory comparisons and remarks about Aluko and broadcaster Lucy Ward. Barton was subsequently given a suspended sentence.

In March 2026, Aluko successfully brought a libel claim against Barton, with the court awarding £339,000 in damages and legal costs. The case concerned posts in which Barton made allegations about Aluko's conduct and motives, which were found to be defamatory. Aluko stated that her legal action was intended to address online abuse and accountability on social media platforms.

== Honours ==
Birmingham City

- FA WPL Cup runner-up: 2001–02
- FA WPL Northern Division: 2001–02
- FA Women's Young Player of the Year: 2002–03
- FA Women's Cup: 2011–12

Charlton Athletic

- FA WPL National Division runner-up: 2003–04, 2004–05
- FA Women's Cup: 2004–05
- FA WPL Cup: 2005–06
- FA Women's Community Shield: 2004

Saint Louis Athletica

- Women's Professional Soccer regular season runner-up: 2009

Chelsea

- FA WSL: 2015, 2017, 2017–18
- FA Women's Cup: 2014–15, 2017–18
- International Women's Club Championship runner-up: 2013

Juventus

- Serie A: 2018–19
- Coppa Italia: 2018–19
- Supercoppa Italiana: 2019

England

- UEFA Women's Championship runner-up: 2009
- Cyprus Cup: 2009, 2013, 2015
- FIFA Women's World Cup third place: 2015

Individual

- Chelsea Ladies Player of the Year: 2014–15
- PFA WSL Team of the Year: 2015, 2017
- FA WSL top scorer: 2016
- Women's Super League Hall of Fame: 2022
- English Football Hall of Fame: 2025

== See also ==
- List of women's footballers with 100 or more international caps
- List of England women's international footballers
- List of sportswomen
- List of association football families
