= Riteesh Mishra =

English association football manager

Personal information
- Place of birth: England

Team information
- Current team: Nottingham Forest (assistant)

Youth career
- Years: Team
- 2010: Nottingham Forest

Managerial career
- 2016–2021: Charlton Athletic
- 2021–2025: Charlton Athletic (assistant)
- 2025–: Nottingham Forest (assistant)

Riteesh Mishra is an English football coach and former player who is currently assistant coach of Women's Super League 2 club Nottingham Forest. He is one of very few elite coaches within professional football from South Asian heritage.

== Playing career ==
As a youth player, Mishra joined the youth academy of English side Nottingham Forest. After graduating from the academy, he trialled with Scottish teams before ending his career at aged 20 due to a career ending injury. After that, he started his managerial career.

== Managerial career ==
In 2016, Mishra was appointed manager of English women's third tier side Charlton Athletic, helping them earn promotion to the English women's second tier. While managing Charlton Athletic, he also worked as a Deloitte talent manager. He holds a UEFA A coaching license. After leading Charlton to promotion in to the 2nd division (then Women's Championship), he led he club to a 3rd place finish just short of back to back promotions. His time at Charlton Athletic then was as Assistant Head Coach, and he continued with the club until 2025 when he made the move to Nottingham Forest.

Riteesh also spent 18 months supporting the England Lionesses pathway teams (U18's and U19's) between 2022-2023.

== Personal life ==
Mishra's father played football at county level.
