= Women's FA Community Shield =

- Founded: 2000; 26 years ago
- Region: England
- Current champions: Chelsea (1st title)
- Most championships: Arsenal (5 titles)

The Women's FA Community Shield was an association football competition in England. It was a national super cup, and the equivalent of the FA Community Shield in male football. It was the first competitive match of the football season. The match was contested between the champions of the FA Women's Premier League (FA Women's Super League in the 2020 edition) and the winners of the Women's FA Cup. When the league champions also won the FA Cup, the cup runners-up played the match.

The first Community Shield was contested in 2000, and lasted for eight years until 2008. In 2020, the competition was briefly revived for one edition and then ceased to exist again.

== Inauguration ==
The Football Association (The FA) held the first charity match in 2000, when Double winners Charlton drew against Arsenal at Craven Cottage and the teams shared the trophy. All proceeds were donated to the Breakthrough Breast Cancer charity. The Charity Shield (renamed the Community Shield in 2002) has been sponsored by Nationwide since its inauguration.

The competition lasted until 2008 and was not contested for eleven years, before being revived by the FA in 2020. The match was billed as a double header after being scheduled at Wembley Stadium on the same day as the men's competition for the first time in the competition's history.

== List of finals ==
The competition was introduced in 2000 and was held annually at different venues until it was discontinued in 2009. It returned in 2020 when it became a double-header with the men's equivalent, hosted on the same day at Wembley Stadium.

Key
&	Title was shared after match finished in a draw
†	Match decided by a penalty shootout after full-time

Women's FA Community Shield
Year	Winners	Score	Runners-up	Venue
2000	Arsenal Charlton Athletic	1–1^{&}	—	Craven Cottage, Fulham
2001	Arsenal	5–2	Doncaster Rovers	Kingsmeadow, Kingston upon Thames
2002	Fulham	2–2^{†}	Arsenal	Brisbane Road, Leyton
2003	Fulham	1–0	Doncaster Rovers	Field Mill, Mansfield
2004	Charlton Athletic	1–0	Arsenal	Broadhall Way, Stevenage
2005	Arsenal	4–0	Charlton Athletic	National Hockey Stadium, Milton Keynes
2006	Arsenal	3–0	Everton	Alexandra Stadium, Crewe
2007	Not held (Note: Not held due to an overlap with the 2007 FIFA Women's World Cup schedule.)			
2008	Arsenal	1–0	Everton	Moss Rose, Macclesfield
The competition was scrapped between 2009 and 2019
2020	Chelsea	2–0	Manchester City	Wembley Stadium, London

=== Performance by club ===
Club	Winners	Runners-up	Winning years
Arsenal	5	2	2000, 2001, 2005, 2006, 2008
Charlton Athletic	2	1	2000, 2004
Fulham	2	—	2002, 2003
Chelsea	1	—	2020
Doncaster Rovers	—	2	—
Everton	—	2	—
Manchester City	—	1	—

== See also ==
- FA Women's Super League
- FA Women's League Cup
- Women's FA Cup
