= Ann-Marie Heatherson =

English footballer

Annie Heatherson
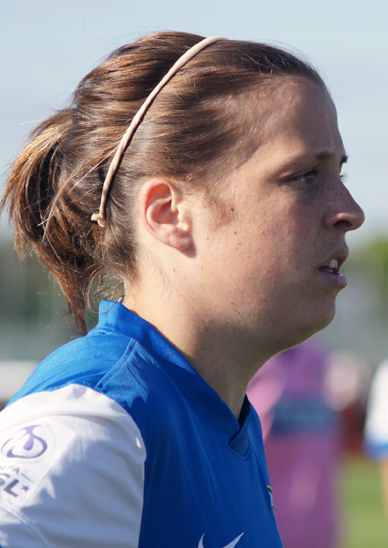
- Heatherson playing for Bristol Academy in 2013

Personal information
- Full name: Ann-Marie Heatherson
- Date of birth: 27 March 1984 (age 42)
- Place of birth: Hackney, England
- Height: 5 ft 2 1/2 in (1.59 m)
- Position: Striker

Youth career
- Charlton Athletic

Senior career*
Years	Team	Apps	(Gls)
2001–2007	Charlton Athletic		
2007	Stjarnan	4	(2)
2007–2008	Fulham		
2008–2010	Millwall Lionesses		
2010	Chelsea		
2010	Buffalo Flash	9	(7)
2010–2014	Bristol Academy	36	(6)
2015–2019	Yeovil Town	57	(15)
- * Club domestic league appearances and goals as of 06:41, 22 May 2018 (UTC)

Ann-Marie "Annie" Heatherson (born 27 March 1984) is an English former footballer who most recently played as a forward and captain for Yeovil Town of the FA Women's National League. She began her career with Charlton Athletic and played for rival London clubs Fulham, Millwall Lionesses and Chelsea Ladies after Charlton folded their women's team in 2007. Heatherson also enjoyed short spells in Iceland and the United States before joining Bristol Academy ahead of the inaugural 2011 FA WSL season, where she was also employed by the club as an ambassador. Heatherson represented England up to Under-21 level and was named in senior squads but never capped. She was named the FA Women's Young Player of the Year in 2004.

== Club career ==
Heatherson progressed through the Charlton Athletic centre of excellence and was the reserves' top-scorer in 2001–02. On her full league debut in November 2003 she scored a hat-trick against Aston Villa, and finished the season with 12 goals from 12 starts. She was named FA Young Player of the Year in 2003–04 and won the League Cup. She played as Charlton lost the 2004 FA Women's Cup final 3–0 to rivals Arsenal, for whom Julie Fleeting scored a hat-trick.

The next season she got a measure of revenge by scoring in Charlton's 1–0 FA Women's Community Shield win over Arsenal, then helping the club beat Everton 1–0 to win the 2005 FA Women's Cup.

After suffering with injuries, Heatherson appeared as an 85th-minute substitute as Charlton lost the 2007 FA Women's Cup final to quadruple-winning Arsenal. When Charlton Athletic withdrew their women's club's funding that summer, Heatherson joined the player exodus and turned out for the Icelandic club Stjarnan.

She then joined Southern Division WFC Fulham ahead of 2007–08, scoring 16 goals in four pre-season friendlies. Heatherson finished as the Southern Division top-scorer but broke her shin towards the end of the season. After Fulham's promotion, Heatherson rejected the chance to play with them in the top flight. She preferred to stay in the Southern Division with Millwall Lionesses, who were managed by her former Charlton Athletic manager, Keith Boanas.

Heatherson's 20 goals in 20 games helped Millwall to promotion in 2008–09. Towards the end of the following season she signed for Chelsea, who had lost Lianne Sanderson to Women's Professional Soccer in the United States.

Heatherson spent the 2010 summer season playing professionally with American W-League club Buffalo Flash. She scored seven goals in nine matches as the Flash stayed unbeaten and won the league.

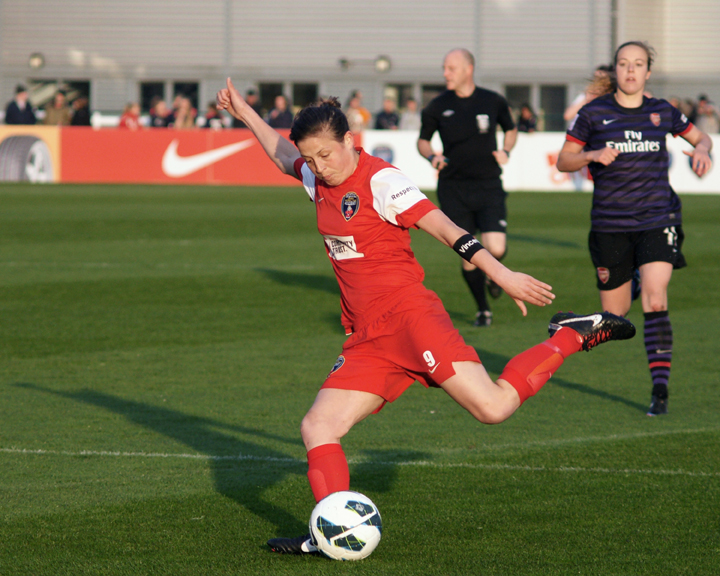
Playing against Arsenal in May 2013

In October 2010 Mark Sampson signed Heatherson for Bristol Academy ahead of their inaugural FA WSL campaign. She started both the 2011 and 2013 FA Women's Cup finals as Bristol lost 2–0 and 3–0, respectively, to Arsenal. The league restructure caused by the FA WSL's foundation meant Bristol qualified for the 2011–12 UEFA Women's Champions League as FA Women's Cup runners-up. Heatherson overcame her fear of flying to score in the away leg of the tie with Russians Energy Voronezh, but Bristol succumbed 5–3 on aggregate.

In the 2013 FA WSL, Heatherson scored as Bristol recovered from 3–0 down at half-time to beat Doncaster Belles 4–3 and force a title decider against Liverpool on the final day of the season. Heatherson played as Bristol were beaten 2–0 at Liverpool, but they consoled themselves with another UEFA Women's Champions League qualification.

Heatherson was released by Bristol Academy in June 2014, after falling out of favour. She retired from football, but was persuaded into a comeback with FA WSL 2 club Yeovil Town in December 2014.

== International career ==
Heatherson was called into the England U21 squad, the first to be organised by the Football Association, in June 2004.

She had earlier been called up to the full England squad for a game against Denmark on 19 February 2004. National coach Hope Powell likened Heatherson to Alan Shearer. She was an unused substitute in the 2–0 win at Fratton Park. Heatherson was also drafted into the squad for the next game against Nigeria in November 2004, when Jo Potter withdrew with a back injury.
