= Charlton Athletic W.F.C. =

English women's association football team

Charlton Athletic Women
- Full name: Charlton Athletic Women's Football Club
- Nickname: The Addicks
- Founded: 1991 as Bromley Borough; 1994 as Croydon W.F.C. 2000 as Charlton Athletic W.F.C.
- Ground: The Valley
- Capacity: 27,111
- Coordinates: 51°29′11″N 0°2′11″E
- Manager: Karen Hills
- League: Women's Super League
- 2025–26: WSL 2, 3rd of 12 (promoted via play-offs)
- Website: charltonafc.com
Home colours	Away colours	Third colours

Charlton Athletic Women's Football Club (CAWFC) is an English professional women's football club based in Charlton, south-east London, England. The club play in the Women's Super League (WSL), the highest tier of English women's football. Since 2024, CAWFC have played all of their home matches at The Valley.

Founded in 1991 as Bromley Borough, the club was also formerly known as Croydon Women's F.C. (1994–2000) before being taken over by Charlton Athletic in 2000. During this period, it became one of the most successful women's teams in England, winning the FA Cup in 2005 and the League Cup in 2004 and 2006. In the early to mid-2000s, the team was considered part of the "top three" in English women's football, alongside Arsenal and Fulham. Following the parent club's relegation from the Premier League, the women's team was controversially disbanded in the summer of 2007, causing almost all of the senior squad to depart. A rescue sponsorship package was subsequently arranged, allowing the women's setup to continue, initially under the management of the Charlton Athletic Community Trust.

CAWFC won the FA Women's Premier League Southern Division title in 2017–18. On 27 May 2018, they beat Northern Division champions Blackburn Rovers Ladies 2–1 in the play-off final at Bramall Lane, Sheffield, and gained promotion to the FA Women's Championship for the 2018–19 season. The club were promoted in the 2025–26 season to the WSL, after defeating Leicester City on penalties in the promotion play-off.

== History ==
=== Bromley Borough ===
The team was formed in 1991 as Bromley Borough by disaffected members of Millwall Lionesses' WFA Cup winning squad. The team broke up in the aftermath of that success and Hope Powell moved with team mate Sue Law to form a new club. They were initially led by Richard Hall with the support of Dan "Le Phyz" Kane. Beginning in the South East Counties League, the club quickly progressed through the divisions. After adding England player Brenda Sempare in 1992, Bromley Borough won all 16 matches in the South East Counties League Division One, scoring 142 goals in the process. The team also reached the semi-final of the Women's FA Cup, where they lost 2–0 to treble-winning Arsenal. In 1993–94 Bromley Borough won the National League Division One South by ten points, securing promotion into the top flight of English women's football. Although they were handed a chastening 10–1 defeat by Doncaster Belles in the fifth round of the FA Women's Cup. Following a swift rise through the divisions, the club won promotion into the National Premier League.

=== Croydon ===
The club entered the top-flight as Croydon, having tied up with Croydon F.C., and Debbie Bampton was appointed player-manager in the 1994 close season. She built a strong team which supplied six of England's squad for the 1995 FIFA Women's World Cup including Kerry Davis as well as Bampton, Powell and Sempare. After securing a fourth-placed finish in 1994–95, in 1995–96 Bampton led the team to a domestic double. After losing both domestic Cup finals to Arsenal Ladies in 1998, the club recaptured the League title in 1999. Another League and FA Women's Cup double followed in 2000.

==== Takeover (2000) ====
Some of Croydon's players were reportedly unhappy with the club's facilities, and playing for the team was costing the players themselves money. In light of this, Crystal Palace approached Croydon regarding a takeover. The bid was discovered by Mick Everett (Charlton Athletic's general manager) and Keith Boanas (head of Charlton's girls' Centre of Excellence), who believed Charlton could offer better facilities than Palace and proposed a "marriage" between Charlton and Croydon. Croydon's chairman Ken Jarvie was interested initially but became concerned about losing control of the club and rejected the offer. Despite Jarvie's opposition to the takeover, at Croydon's AGM on 9 June 2000, the club's players voted to accept a hostile takeover from Charlton, and Bampton resigned as manager.

=== Charlton Athletic ===
The club's first silverware under the new name came in the same year when the Charity Shield was shared with Arsenal, after the match resulted in a draw. Charlton reached the 2003 FA Cup final but lost 3–0 to Fulham. In the following season (2003–04) Charlton finished runners-up in the Premier League, just one point behind winners Arsenal, and again reached the FA Cup final which they lost to Arsenal. The season did bring success to the club, though, with a 1–0 victory over Fulham in the final of the League Cup. In 2004–05, Charlton won both the Community Shield, beating Arsenal 1–0, and the FA Cup, beating Everton 1–0 in the final, and once more finished runners up in the league to Arsenal. In 2005–06, Charlton regained the League Cup, beating Arsenal in the final. However, in this season, and also the 2006–07 season, Charlton finished third in the league, meaning the club missed the opportunity to participate in the UEFA Cup. In May 2007, Charlton were again runners up in the FA Cup, losing to Arsenal in the final. During these successful years under manager Keith Boanas and assistant Matt Beard, the team included several current and former England internationals, notably club captain Casey Stoney, goalkeeper Pauline Cope, Joanne Broadhurst, Eniola Aluko and Katie Chapman. Aluko and Chapman went on to play professionally in the United States.

==== Controversial disbandment (2007) ====
The same day as the 2007 FA Cup final, Charlton Athletic's men's team was relegated from the Premier League. It became evident that, in order to ensure the club's financial survival, a number of budget cuts would have to be enacted. On 23 June 2007, it was announced that the disbandment of Charlton's women's set up would form part of this. This decision was criticised by, among others, several of the club's players at the time, including Casey Stoney and Danielle Murphy. Charlton's chief executive, Peter Varney, defended the decision and pointed to the lack of exposure in the media and lack of funding given to the women's game from the Football Association as reasons for undertaking the decision.

==== Resurrection (2007–2011) ====
On 22 August 2007, it was announced sponsorship had been secured by Charlton for the women's set up, allowing a senior side to continue to compete under Charlton's name. The women's team, now controlled by the Charlton Athletic Community Trust, the organisation which operates Charlton's community programmes, appointed former Charlton player Paul Mortimer as the women's team's new coach. However, due to the exodus of players after the original closure announcement, only two players from the previous squad remained by the time the club's rescue was in place although a few more returned as the season progressed. The reconstituted team finished bottom of the FA Women's Premier League National Division at the end of the 2007–08 season, thereby relegating them to the League's Southern Division. The team stabilised at this level and a reserve team was successfully re-established, twice winning the Kent Women's Cup in 2008–09 and 2010–11. The first team were promoted back to the National Division at the end of the 2010–11 season as Southern Division champions.

==== Rehabilitation (2011–2021) ====
The club finished their first season back in the National Division in fifth place. In the following season they were unable to improve, finishing in a disappointing seventh place after Mortimer stepped down. The club made an application to enter the new breakaway Women's Super League in 2013, although it was unsuccessful as an FA requirement at the time of the bid was that applicant clubs were to be a separate legal entity. This led to the formation of Charlton Athletic Women's Football Club Limited on 9 February 2013. The club remained affiliated with Charlton Athletic and the Community Trust. The majority shareholder was Charlton fan and local businessman Stephen King, CEO of PHSC plc. CAWFC won the FA Women's Premier League Cup in 2015, beating Sheffield F.C. 4–2 on penalties after it was 0–0 at the end of extra time in the final held at Nuneaton Borough F.C.'s ground. The club made the final again in 2017 but were defeated by Tottenham Hotspur Ladies 4–3 on penalties after a scoreless match and extra time. In the 2017–18 FA Women's Premier League, Charlton were champions of the FA Women's National League South and defeated Northern champions Blackburn Rovers 2–1 in the Championship play-off, to win promotion to the FA Women's Championship.

==== Turning professional (2021–present) ====
In February 2021, Charlton Athletic men's team owner Thomas Sandgaard agreed terms to also take over Charlton Athletic Women from Stephen King. This deal brought both clubs under the same ownership for the first time since 2007. Former Charlton player Karen Hills was appointed as manager in March 2021, and the club went full time in July of that year. Sandgaard attempted to change the name of the team to "Charlton Ladies", but the move received backlash from players and fans, and was rejected by the FA in July 2022. In July 2023, both clubs were sold by Sandgaard to SE7 Partners, a UK-based subsidiary of Global Football Partners. In April 2024, the club began playing all of their home matches at The Valley, the same stadium as the men's team. During the 2025–26 Women's Super League 2, Charlton led the table for most of the season, including a run of 27 league matches unbeaten, a streak that had begun in the previous season. On the final day, Charlton remained in top spot, only to eventually finish in third place, narrowly missing out on automatic promotion. In front of a record crowd for the women's team at The Valley, Charlton defeated Leicester City on penalties after a 0–0 draw in the promotion play-off, to gain promotion to the Women's Super League. Charlton goalkeeper Sophie Whitehouse made four saves in the penalty shoot-out, while also winning the WSL2 Golden Glove award with 8 clean sheets, and Karen Hills won the WSL2 Manager of the Year award.

== Players ==
=== Current squad ===
As of 5 September 2026

Note: Flags indicate national team as defined under FIFA eligibility rules; some limited exceptions apply. Players may hold more than one non-FIFA nationality.

No.	Pos.	Nation	Player
1	GK	IRL	Sophie Whitehouse
2	DF	NIR	Ellie Mason
3	DF	SCO	Charlotte Newsham
4	DF	AUS	Grace Johnston
5	DF	ENG	Elisha N'Dow
6	MF	AUS	Leah Davidson
7	FW	ESP	Paula Partido (on loan from London City Lionesses)
8	MF	ENG	Carla Humphrey
9	FW	FRA	Lorena Azzaro (on loan from Paris FC)
10	MF	USA	Gillian Kenney
11	MF	ENG	Lucy Fitzgerald
12	MF	ENG	Jodie Hutton
13	FW	ISL	Linda Líf Boama

No.	Pos.	Nation	Player
14	MF	ENG	Keira Flannery
15	FW	ENG	Katie Lockwood
16	FW	SWE	Cassandra Korhonen
17	DF	ENG	Kiera Skeels (captain)
18	FW	HUN	Gloria Siber
19	DF	FRA	Hawa Cissoko
20	FW	WAL	Mary McAteer
21	GK	ENG	Anna Pederson
22	MF	AUS	Emily van Egmond
23	DF	IRL	Lucia Lobato
24	GK	FIN	Anna Koivunen
25	DF	ENG	Lizzie Waldie
29	DF	ENG	Ashleigh Neville

=== Out on loan ===
Note: Flags indicate national team as defined under FIFA eligibility rules; some limited exceptions apply. Players may hold more than one non-FIFA nationality.

No.	Pos.	Nation	Player

== Coaching staff ==
As of 8 August 2026

- Head Coach: Karen Hills
- Goalkeeping Coach: Neil Moore
- First Team Assistant Coach: Joe Sheehan
- First Team Assistant Coach: Rosi Webb
- Lead Analyst: Sejin Yoo
- Athletic Performance Lead: Matthew Walson
- Assistant Performance Coach: Emily Pritty
- Performance and Wellbeing Lead: Kellsey King
- Head of Women's Football: Jemma White
- Sports Therapist: Adrienne Lee
- Doctor: James Stronge

== Managerial history ==
Name	Tenure	Refs
(Northern Ireland) Gill Wylie (player-manager)	August 2000 – November 2000	
(England) Keith Boanas	November 2000 – June 2007	
(England) Paul Mortimer	August 2007 – September 2012	
(England) Bill Long (caretaker)	September 2012 – June 2013	
(England) Stuart Weston	June 2013 – February 2015	
(England) Jeremy Parsons	February 2015 – January 2016	
(England) Riteesh Mishra	January 2016 – March 2021	
(England) Karen Hills	March 2021 – present	

== Honours ==
=== League ===
- FA Women's Premier League National Division (level 1)
  - Runners-up (2): 2003–04, 2004–05
- Women's Championship / Women's Super League 2 (level 2)
  - Promotion play-off winners (1): 2025–26
  - Runners-up (1): 2023–24
- FA Women's National League Southern Division (level 3)
  - Champions (2): 2010–11, 2017–18
  - Play-off winners (1): 2017–18
  - Runners-up (1): 2015–16

=== Cup ===
- FA Cup
  - Winners (1): 2004–05
  - Runners-up (3): 2002–03, 2003–04, 2006–07
- FA Women's Premier League Cup
  - Winners (2): 2003–04, 2005–06
  - Runners-up (1): 2004–05
- FA Women's Community Shield
  - Winners (2): 2000, 2004
  - Runners-up (1): 2005
- Premier League Cup
  - Winners (1): 2014–15
  - Runners-up (1): 2016–17
- London Cup
  - Winners (4): 2003, 2005, 2006, 2013
- Capital Women's Senior Cup
  - Winners (5): 2014, 2015, 2016, 2017, 2018
- London Capital Intermediate Cup
  - Winners (1): 2016
- Isthmian Cup
  - Winners (1): 2015
  - Runners-up (3): 2016, 2017, 2018
- Kent County Cup
  - Winners (3): 2003, 2009, 2011
