= Pauline Cope =

English footballer

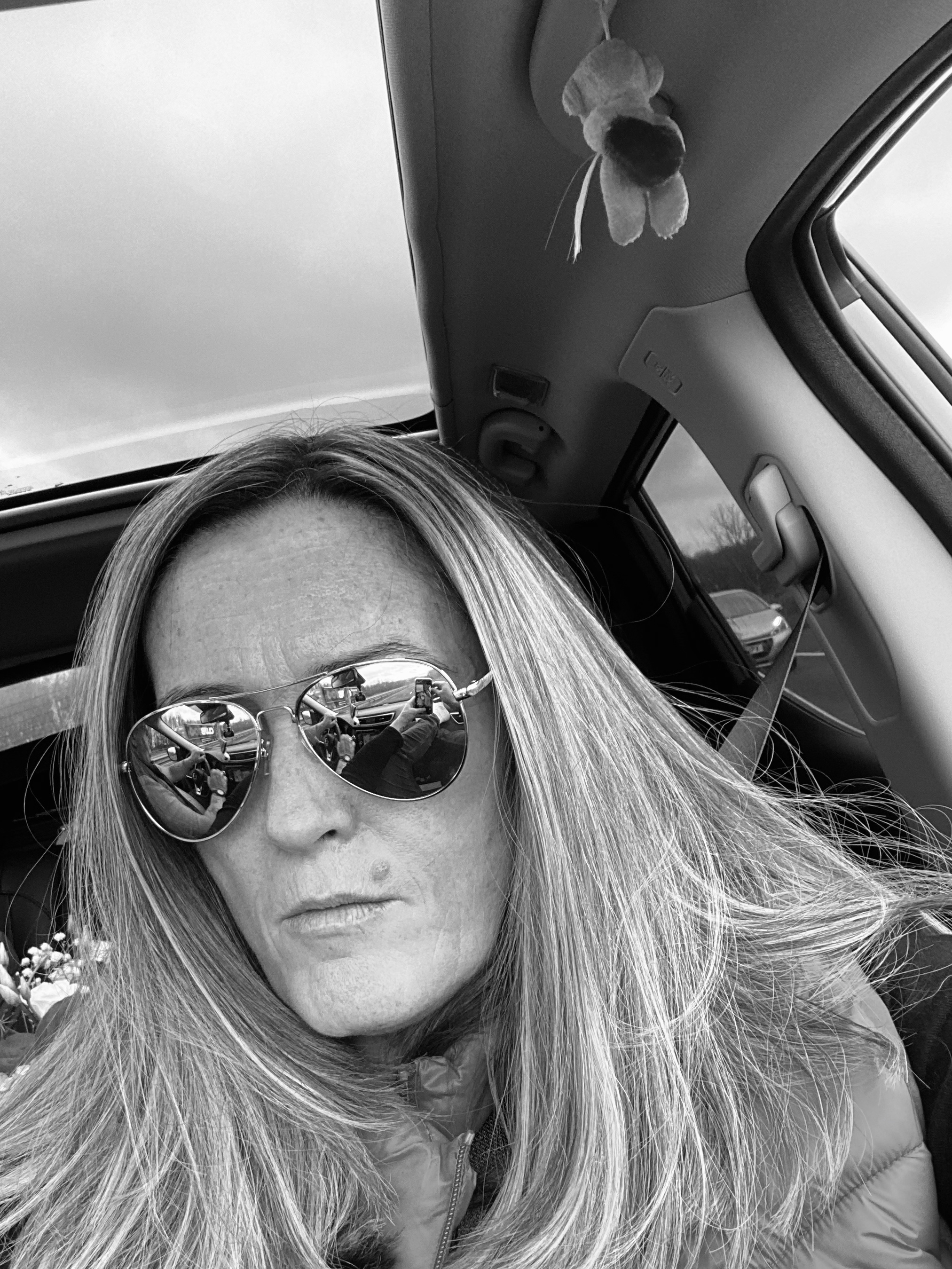

Personal information
- Full name: Pauline Cope-Boanas
- Date of birth: 16 February 1969 (age 57)
- Place of birth: Lambeth, England
- Height: 5 ft 11 in (1.80 m)
- Position: Goalkeeper

Senior career*
Years	Team	Apps	(Gls)
1982–1990	Millwall Lionesses		
1990–1991	Arsenal Ladies		
1991–1993	Millwall Lionesses		
1994–1995	Arsenal Ladies		
1995–1998	Millwall Lionesses		
1998–2000	Croydon		
2000–2006	Charlton Athletic		

International career
1995–2004	England	60	(0)
- * Club domestic league appearances and goals

Pauline Cope (born 16 February 1969), whose married name is Pauline Cope-Boanas, is an English former football goalkeeper. She won 60 caps for the England women's national football team between her debut in 1995 and retirement from international football in 2004. Cope was England's first choice goalkeeper at the 1995 FIFA Women's World Cup and UEFA Women's Euro 2001. Ted Copeland, England's coach at the former competition, described Cope as the best female goalkeeper in the world.

Having started playing with Millwall Lionesses in her native South London, Cope remained until 1998. Her time at the club was interspersed with two separate spells with Arsenal and a season out of football in 1993–94. She moved on to Croydon, who came under the auspices of Charlton Athletic in 2000. Cope finished her club career playing for Charlton under the management of partner and future husband Keith Boanas, retiring in 2006. A League champion on three occasions, Cope won the FA Women's Cup four times and was a losing finalist twice.

== Club career ==
At club level Cope won the FA Women's Cup with, Arsenal, Millwall Lionesses and Croydon. Her first success came in the 1995 final when Arsenal beat Liverpool 3-2 and her second came in 1997 when Millwall beat Wembley 1-0 with Cope as captain in her second triumph.

In the 2000 FA Women's Cup Final at Bramall Lane, Cope saved a penalty kick from her England teammate Karen Walker as Croydon beat Doncaster Belles 2–1. As Croydon celebrated their win, Cope revealed a T-shirt bearing the legend: "I love my Keith." The following week Croydon beat Aston Villa 6–0 to win the league and clinch a domestic double.

In 2003 Cope was employed as a full-time girls' development officer with Charlton Athletic. The position allowed her to improve the way she trained: "I'm in the best position in women's football in Europe. Maybe even the world, because I get to train day-in day-out with Dean Kiely, who's one of the best keepers around." She played in Charlton's 3–0 defeat to full-time professional Fulham in the 2003 FA Women's Cup Final.

In May 2004 Cope played in goal for Charlton in their 3–0 final defeat against Arsenal. She won her fourth Women's FA Cup in 2005 when Charlton beat Everton 1-0 at the Boleyn Ground.

A fortnight after helping Charlton beat Arsenal 2–1 in the 2006 Premier League Cup final, 37-year-old Cope produced a vintage performance in the FA Women's Cup semi final but Charlton lost 2–1 to the same opponents. Having watched his side score a late winner in extra time, Arsenal manager Vic Akers declared: "Pauline Cope was absolutely outstanding." Cope then retired from club football at the end of the 2005–06 season. After her final game, a 1–0 defeat at Everton which consigned Charlton to third place in the table, club captain Casey Stoney said of Cope: "If I'm honest I don't think she can be replaced. She's the best goalkeeper I've ever seen."

== International career ==
Cope played 60 times for the senior England women's national football team, making her debut in a 1–1 friendly draw with Italy in Florence on 26 January 1995. By the time of the 1995 FIFA Women's World Cup, held in Sweden during June 1995, she had displaced former Millwall teammate Lesley Higgs as England's first choice goalkeeper. At the tournament it was reported that Cope's performances in comprehensive defeats by Norway and Germany had averted "hideous embarrassment" for the outmatched English team. National coach Ted Copeland described her as "the best keeper in the world."

In October 2000, goalkeeping understudy Rachel Brown played in the UEFA Women's Euro 2001 qualification play-off in Ukraine when Cope was struck down with a stomach complaint on the morning of the game. Cope was restored to the team for the final tournament and played in all three games as England went out in the group stage.

In April 2004 Cope unexpectedly retired from international football. In 2008, she was inducted into the English Football Hall of Fame.

She was allotted 106 when the FA announced their legacy numbers scheme to honour the 50th anniversary of England’s inaugural international.

== Coaching career ==
In September 2015 Cope joined Gillingham Ladies as a goalkeeper coach.

== Personal life ==
Cope is married to former Estonia women's team coach Keith Boanas and stepmother to Sonny and Kari Boanas. Despite her long association with Millwall's female section, Cope remains a West Ham United supporter.

== Honours ==
- FA Women's Premier League National Division: 3

1994–95, 1998–99, 1999–00

- FA Women's Cup: 4

1994–95, 1996–97, 1999–00, 2004–05

- Women's League Cup: 4

1993–94, 1996–97, 2003–04, 2005–06
