= Danielle Murphy =

English footballer

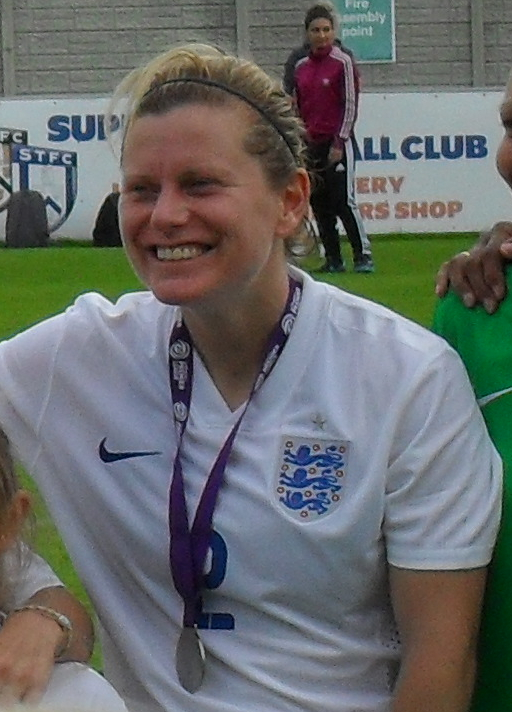
- Danielle Murphy in August 2018

Personal information
- Full name: Danielle Murphy
- Date of birth: 4 June 1981 (age 45)
- Place of birth: Sidcup, England
- Height: 5 ft 6 in (1.68 m)
- Positions: Defender; midfielder

College career
Years	Team	Apps	(Gls)
1999–2002	Florida Gators		

Senior career*
Years	Team	Apps	(Gls)
1996–1999	Millwall Lionesses		
2003–2007	Charlton Athletic		
2007–2008	Watford		
2008–2013	Barnet		

International career^{‡}
1997–2001	England	25	(0)
- * Club domestic league appearances and goals as of 00:05, 17 February 2019 (UTC) ‡ National team caps and goals as of 00:05, 17 February 2019 (UTC)

Danielle Murphy (born 4 June 1981) is an English former footballer who played as a defender or midfielder for Millwall Lionesses, Charlton Athletic, Watford and Barnet. She won 25 caps for England at senior international level.

== Club career ==
Murphy joined Millwall Lionesses as a 14-year-old after a chance meeting with Pauline Cope. She made her Premier League debut at 14 and won the 1997 FA Women's Cup, playing alongside fellow 15-year-old Katie Chapman. In 1999 Murphy went to the University of Florida on a soccer scholarship. During her four years in the United States, she played for the Florida Gators women's soccer team in National Collegiate Athletic Association (NCAA) competition and was named to the 2001 All-American team. While playing for Florida she was a teammate of Abby Wambach.

When Murphy returned to England in July 2003, she signed for Charlton Athletic Ladies. In four successful years Charlton won the 2005 FA Women's Cup and the Premier League Cup in 2004 and 2006. Murphy was then an outspoken critic of relegated Charlton Athletic's decision to axe the women's team in 2007.

Murphy was one of seven players to join Watford Ladies from Charlton in August 2007. She moved to Barnet Ladies in February 2008.

== International career ==
Murphy was the captain of England U-18s when she made her senior debut, aged 16, in a match against Scotland. She was England's youngest ever player since the Football Association took over the team in 1993.

She won 25 caps and was named in the Euro 2001 squad. After participating in 2003 FIFA Women's World Cup qualification, Murphy retired from international football to concentrate on her studies in America.

Murphy was allotted 127 when the FA announced their legacy numbers scheme to honour the 50th anniversary of England’s inaugural international.

== Personal life ==
Murphy attended Beaverwood School for Girls and graduated with a degree in sociology from the University of Florida. She works as a Firefighter in the London Fire Brigade, and ran the London Marathon in 2006. She has two beautiful children.

== Honours ==
- FA Women's Cup: 2

1996–97, 2004–05

- FA Women's Premier League Cup: 4

1996–97, 2003–04, 2005–06, 2010–11

== See also ==
- List of Florida Gators soccer players
- List of University of Florida alumni
