= Keith Boanas =

English football manager (born 1959)

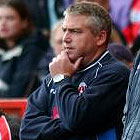

Personal information
- Full name: Keith Robert Boanas
- Date of birth: 22 April 1959 (age 67)
- Place of birth: Hitchin, England
- Position: Defender

Senior career*
Years	Team	Apps	(Gls)
1998–1999	Tooting & Mitcham United		

Managerial career
- 1998–2001: Tooting & Mitcham United
- 2000–2007: Charlton Athletic Women
- 2008–2009: Millwall Lionesses
- 2009–2016: Estonia Women
- 2017: Watford Ladies
- 2024: Chatham Town Women
- * Club domestic league appearances and goals

Keith Robert Boanas (born 22 April 1959) is an English football manager and former player who played as a defender.

Boanas has worked with and assisted in the development of many senior England women internationals such as former captain Casey Stoney and Eni Aluko. He also assisted his wife, Pauline Cope-Boanas and Marieanne Spacey, the former assistant England national coach whom he tutored for the English FA Level 2, UEFA B. Boanas also worked with many figures from the men's game, including Chris Powell, former Charlton Athletic player, head coach, and PFA president. His career has included working with former Premier league goalkeeper Dean Kiely, and Simon McMenemy, who was a national manager of the Philippines national team, and in player development, Leroy Lita who played for Swansea City, and Jason Euell who played for Charlton Athletic.

== Playing career ==
Boanas has played and coached on the semi-professional circuit. Boanas made three substitute appearances for Tooting & Mitcham United after being appointed manager in 1998–99.

== Coaching career ==
=== Early career ===
Prior to taking the Tooting & Mitcham United head coach position in 1998, he had become The County Coach in England's Surrey County Football Association. He also served as director of Margate FC's centre of excellence.

=== Charlton Athletic ===
In November 2000, Boanas took over as manager of Charlton Athletic Ladies, while still managing Tooting & Mitcham United FC. In August 2001, Boanas furthered his role with Charlton Athletic Ladies, resigning from his role at Tooting & Mitcham. With Charlton Ladies, Boanas alongside his assistant Matt Beard reached three successive FA Women's Cup finals, winning the 2005 trophy after defeats to Fulham in 2003 and Arsenal in 2004. He reached the final once again in 2007. He also guided Charlton Ladies to further cup success in the FA Women's Premier League Cup in 2004 and 2006. Despite the success of Charlton Ladies team, 2007 saw the Charlton Athletic men's team relegated from the Premier League and they scrapped their entire women's section as a result of budgetary constraints.

Boanas continued his work with the Surrey FA as The County Coach, and was then approached for the position of assistant director of the David Beckham Academy.

Boanas returned to the women's game in June 2008, being appointed manager of Millwall Lionesses.

=== Estonia ===
In January 2009, he left Millwall to be appointed as manager of the Estonia women's national football team and further tasked with re-structuring youth development and coach education in a developing football nation. Boanas said at the time that he was disappointed not to have been considered by the FA to be England women's manager. In November 2012, Boanas reportedly agreed a three-year contract to take over as manager of Lincoln Ladies, to begin in January 2013. However Boanas decided not to take up the position offered at Lincoln and continued his career in Estonia. Boanas spent seven years as Estonia manager. He would later state in 2025, "Charlton and Estonia were the massive parts of my career ... I know that my work with the national team impacted positively on the women’s game over there. That was important to me, to leave a legacy."

=== Later career ===
Boanas was named head coach of Watford F.C. Ladies on 7 February 2017, before leaving in December 2017.

Boanas then became head coach of Barking Abbey Girls' Football Academy at Barking Abbey School in January 2018.

In 2024, he took over as manager of Women's National League side Chatham Town F.C. Women.

== Personal life ==
Boanas is married to former England and Charlton Athletic goalkeeper Pauline Cope and has two children named Sonny and Kari Boanas. In September 2012 after achieving all his senior coaching qualifications in the UK, Boanas elected to achieve his UEFA Pro Licence in Europe, under Dutch tutor Arno Pijpers. Boanas is the author of three youth development manuals for coaches and delivers coach education courses and clinics worldwide and also academy training workshops for Surrey coaches with Fulham academy players.

== Honours ==
=== Manager ===
Tooting & Mitcham United

- Ryman League Division Two: 2000–01

Charlton Athletic W.F.C

- FA Women's Cup: 2004–05
- FA Women's Premier League Cup: 2003–04, 2005–06

Estonia

- Women's Baltic Cup: 2009, 2010, 2012, 2013
- Women's Under-19 Baltic Cup: 2009, 2012
- Women's Under-17 Baltic Cup: 2010, 2012, 2013
- Seniors UEFA Mini Tournament Armenia: 2010

Individual

- Nationwide Coach of the Year: 2003–04
- Ryman League Coach of the Year: 2004–05
- Estonian FA JALKA Magazine Coach of the Year: 2010

Sporting positions
Preceded by Juri Saar	Estonia women's national football team manager 2009–2016	Succeeded by Jarmo Matikainen
