= 2006–07 Arsenal L.F.C. season =

Arsenal Ladies
2006–07 season
- Chairman: Peter Hill-Wood
- Manager: Vic Akers
- Stadium: Meadow Park
- Premier League: Champions
- FA Cup: Winners
- Premier League Cup: Winners
- UEFA Cup: Winners
- Community Shield: Winners
- London County Cup: Winners
- Top goalscorer: League: Lianne Sanderson (30); All: Lianne Sanderson (41)
- Biggest win: 14–0 (vs Fulham (H), Premier League, 27 August 2006)
- Biggest defeat: N/A
Home colours	Away colours	Third colours

The 2006–07 season was Arsenal Ladies Football Club's 20th season since forming in 1987. The club participated in the National Division of the FA Women's Premier League, winning the title for a 4th consecutive season, winning every single match. In May, the team played their first ever game at Emirates Stadium, defeating Everton 3–2. They completed a domestic treble by also winning the Premier League Cup and the FA Women's Cup, defeating Leeds United and Charlton Athletic in the finals respectively. That treble became a quadruple when they won the UEFA Women's Cup, defeating Umeå over two legs, Alex Scott's last-gasp long range effort in Sweden proving to be the difference between the two sides.

This was Arsenal Ladies' first ever European Trophy, the first for the club as whole since the 1994 European Cup Winner's Cup, and they remain the sole English club to win a Women's European Trophy. Combined with the FA Women's Community Shield and The London County Cup, Arsenal won a clean sweep of six titles, a feat that has never been repeated in the English game.

== Squad information & statistics ==
=== First team squad ===
Squad statistics correct as of May 2007

Squad No.	Name	Date of birth (age)	Since	Signed from
Goalkeepers
1	(Republic of Ireland) Emma Byrne	14 June 1979 (aged 28)	2000	(Denmark) Fortuna Hjørring
13	(England) Amy Pearce		2006	(England) Arsenal Academy
24	(Jamaica) Becky Spencer	22 February 1991 (aged 16)	2005	(England) Arsenal Academy
Defenders
3	(Republic of Ireland) Yvonne Tracy	27 February 1981 (aged 26)	2000	(Republic of Ireland) St Patrick's Athletic
5	(England) Leanne Champ	10 August 1983 (aged 23)	2001	(England) Millwall Lionesses
6	(England) Faye White (c)	2 February 1978 (aged 29)	1996	(England) Three Bridges
12	(England) Alex Scott	14 October 1984 (aged 22)	2005	(England) Birmingham City
15	(England) Cori Daniels	4 June 1986 (aged 21)	2002	(England) Charlton Athletic
18	(England) Anita Asante	27 April 1985 (aged 22)	1998	(England) Arsenal Academy
23	(England) Mary Phillip	14 March 1977 (aged 30)	2004	(England) Fulham
26	(England) Gilly Flaherty	24 August 1991 (aged 15)	2006	(England) Arsenal Academy
27	(Republic of Ireland) Seana Cooke	6 July 1989 (aged 17)	2006	(England) Arsenal Academy
	(England) Meghan McKeag	12 August 1989 (aged 17)	2006	(England) Arsenal Academy
	(Netherlands) Félicienne Minnaar	31 January 1989 (aged 18)	2006	(England) Arsenal Academy
	(England) Faye Marsh		2005	(England) Arsenal Academy
	Emma Ford		2006	(England) Arsenal Academy
Midfielders
4	(Wales) Jayne Ludlow	7 January 1979 (aged 28)	2000	(England) Southampton Saints
7	(Republic of Ireland) Ciara Grant	17 May 1978 (aged 29)	1998	(Republic of Ireland) St Patrick's Athletic
8	(England) Kelly Smith	29 October 1978 (aged 28)	2005	(United States) New Jersey Wildcats
16	(England) Sian Larkin	10 August 1988 (aged 18)	2003	(England) Arsenal Academy
17	(England) Katie Chapman	15 June 1982 (aged 25)	2006	(England) Charlton Athletic
19	(England) Charlotte Gurr	16 August 1989 (aged 17)	2004	(England) Arsenal Academy
21	(England) Elizabeth Wicks	13 October 1989 (aged 17)	2006	(England) Arsenal Academy
22	(England) Danielle Buet	31 October 1988 (aged 18)	2005	(England) Arsenal Academy
	(England) Lauren Walker	12 March 1989 (aged 18)	2006	(England) Wolverhampton Wanderers
	(Netherlands) Renée Slegers	5 February 1989 (aged 18)	2006	(England) Arsenal Academy
	(England) Danielle Saulter		2004	(England) Arsenal Academy
	(Japan) Yuko Tukahashi		2006	(England) Arsenal Academy
Forwards
9	(England) Lianne Sanderson	3 February 1988 (aged 19)	2003	(England) Arsenal Academy
10	(Scotland) Julie Fleeting	18 December 1980 (aged 26)	2004	(Scotland) Ross County
11	(England) Rachel Yankey	1 November 1979 (aged 27)	2005	(United States) New Jersey Wildcats
14	(England) Karen Carney	1 August 1987 (aged 19)	2006	(England) Birmingham City
20	(England) Gemma Davison	17 April 1987 (aged 20)	2001	(England) Watford
25	(England) Stacey Sowden		2006	(England) Arsenal Academy
	(England) Sarah Wiltshire	7 July 1991 (aged 15)	2007	(England) Arsenal Academy
	Beth Lloyd		2005	(England) Arsenal Academy

=== Appearances and goals ===
No.	Name	PLND		FA Cup		PL Cup		LC Cup		Comm Shield		UEFA Cup		Total	
No.	Name	Apps	Goals	Apps	Goals	Apps	Goals	Apps	Goals	Apps	Goals	Apps	Goals	Apps	Goals
Goalkeepers
1	(Republic of Ireland) Emma Byrne	22	0	5	0	5	0	1	0	1	0	9	0	43	0
13	(England) Amy Pearce	0	0	0	0	0	0	0	0	0	0	0	0	0	0
24	(Jamaica) Rebecca Spencer	0	0	0+1	0	0	0	1	0	0	0	0	0	1+1	0
Defenders
3	(Republic of Ireland) Yvonne Tracy	0	0	0	0	0	0	0	0	0	0	0	0	0	0
5	(England) Leanne Champ	0+2	0	0	0	0	0	1	0	1	0	0	0	2+2	0
6	(England) Faye White (c)	3+2	1	0	0	0	0	1	0	0	0	0+1	0	4+3	1
12	(England) Alex Scott	22	2	4	1	5	0	0	0	1	0	9	1	41	4
15	(England) Cori Daniels	0+1	0	0	0	0	0	1	2	0	0	0+1	0	1+2	2
18	(England) Anita Asante	22	1	5	1	5	0	0	0	1	0	9	0	42	2
23	(England) Mary Phillip	20	0	4	0	5	0	0	0	1	0	9	0	39	0
26	(England) Gilly Flaherty	2+8	0	1+1	1	0+1	0	1	0	0	0	0	0	4+10	1
27	(Republic of Ireland) Seana Cooke	0	0	0	0	0	0	+1	0	0	0	0	0	0+1	0
	(England) Meghan McKeag	0	0	0	0	0	0	2	0	0	0	0	0	2	0
	(Netherlands) Félicienne Minnaar	0	0	0	0	0	0	1+1	0	0	0	0	0	1+1	0
	(England) Faye Marsh	0	0	0	0	0	0	0	0	0	0	0	0	0	0
	Emma Ford	0	0	0	0	0	0	0	0	0	0	0	0	0	0
Midfielders
4	(Wales) Jayne Ludlow	17+1	14	5	7	4	1	1	0	1	0	10	2	38+1	24
7	(Republic of Ireland) Ciara Grant	21	0	5	0	5	1	1	0	0+1	0	7+1	0	39+2	1
8	(England) Kelly Smith	18+2	19	4+1	4	3+2	2	1	2	1	1	5	5	32+5	33
16	(England) Sian Larkin	3+11	1	0+4	01	2+2	1	2	0	0+1	0	2+3	0	9+21	3
17	(England) Katie Chapman	21	14	5	3	4	2	0	00	1	1	8	1	39	21
19	(England) Charlotte Gurr	0+1	0	0	0	0+1	0	2	1	0+0	0	0+2	0	2+4	1
21	(England) Elizabeth Wicks	0	0	0	0	0	0	1	0	0	0	0	0	1	0
22	(England) Danielle Buet	0	0	0	0	0	0	0	1	0	0	0	0	0	1
	(England) Lauren Walker	0	0	0	0	0	0	0	0	0	0	0	0	0	0
	(England) Danielle Saulter	0	0	0	0	0	0	1+1	0	0	0	0	0	1+1	0
	(Netherlands) Renée Slegers	0	0	0	0	0	0	0+2	0	0	0	0	0	0+2	0
	(Japan) Yuko Tukahashi	0	0	0	0	0	0	0+1	0	0	0	0	0	0+1	0
Forwards
9	(England) Lianne Sanderson	20+2	30	5	6	5	3	0	0	1	0	9	2	40+2	41
10	(Scotland) Julie Fleeting	6+2	12	3	0	3+1	8	0	0	0	0	9	9	21+3	29
11	(England) Rachel Yankey	20+1	11	4+1	1	5	2	0	0	1	0	8+1	3	38+3	17
14	(England) Karen Carney	19+2	9	3+2	1	2	0	0	0	1	0	4+3	2	29+7	12
20	(England) Gemma Davison	6+15	4	1+4	4	2+2	1	2	0	0+1	01	1+6	1	12+28	11
25	(England) Stacey Sowden	0	0	0	0	0	0	0	0	0	0	0	0	0	0
	(England) Sarah Wiltshire	0+1	0	0	0	0	0	0	0	0	0	0	0	0+1	0
	Beth Lloyd	0	0	0	0	0	0	0	0	0	0	0	0	1+2	0

=== Goalscorers ===
Rank	No.	Position	Name	PLND	FA Cup	PL Cup	LC Cup	Comm Shield	UEFA Cup	Total
1	9	FW	(England) Lianne Sanderson	30	6	3	0	0	2	41
2	8	MF	(England) Kelly Smith	19	4	2	2	1	5	33
3	10	FW	(Scotland) Julie Fleeting	12	0	8	0	0	9	29
4	4	MF	(Wales) Jayne Ludlow	14	7	1	0	0	2	24
5	17	MF	(England) Katie Chapman	14	3	2	0	1	1	21
6	11	FW	(England) Rachel Yankey	11	1	2	0	0	3	17
7	14	FW	(England) Karen Carney	9	1	0	0	0	2	12
8	20	FW	(England) Gemma Davison	4	4	1	0	1	1	11
9	12	DF	(England) Alex Scott	2	1	0	0	0	1	4
10	16	MF	(England) Sian Larkin	1	1	1	0	0	0	3
11	18	DF	(England) Anita Asante	1	1	0	0	0	0	2
11	15	DF	(England) Cori Daniels	0	0	0	2	0	0	2
13	22	MF	(England) Danielle Buet	0	0	0	1	0	0	1
13	7	MF	(Republic of Ireland) Ciara Grant	0	0	1	0	0	0	1
13	6	DF	(England) Faye White	1	0	0	0	0	0	1
13	26	DF	(England) Gilly Flaherty	0	1	0	0	0	0	1
13	19	MF	(England) Charlotte Gurr	0	0	0	1	0	0	1
Own goal				1	0	0	0	0	1	2
Total				119	30	21	6	3	27	206

=== Clean sheets ===
Rank	No.	Name	PLND	FA Cup	PL Cup	LC Cup	Comm Shield	UEFA Cup	Total
1	1	(Republic of Ireland) Emma Byrne	14	2	3	1	1	6	27
2	24	(Jamaica) Rebecca Spencer	0	0	0	1	0	0	1
Total			14	2	3	2	1	6	28

== Transfers, loans and other signings ==
=== Transfers in ===
Announcement date	No.	Position	Player	From club
13 July 2006	14	FW	(England) Karen Carney	(England) Birmingham City
19 July 2006	17	MF	(England) Katie Chapman	(England) Charlton Athletic
2006		MF	(England) Lauren Walker	(England) Wolverhampton Wanderers

=== Transfers out ===
Announcement date	No.	Position	Player	To club
2006	21	MF	(England) Lisa Burrows	(England) Watford
2006	11	MF	(England) Rachel McArthur	(England) Leeds United
2006	2	DF	(England) Kirsty Pealing	Retired
2006	24	MF	(England) Karen Ray	(United States) Hartford Hawks
2006	17	DF	(England) Hayley Kemp	
2006		DF	(England) Vaila Barsley	(United States) St. John's Red Storm
2006		FW	(Republic of Ireland) Sarah McGrath	(United States) St. John's Red Storm
2006		DF	(Northern Ireland) Ashley Hutton	

=== Loans out ===
Announcement date	No.	Position	Player	To club
2006	10	FW	(Scotland) Julie Fleeting	(Iceland) Valur

== Club ==
=== Kit ===
Supplier: Nike / Sponsor: Fly Emirates

Home	Away	Third

== Pre-season ==
29 July 2006	SC 07 Bad Neuenahr	0–5	Arsenal	Willstätt
15:30 CET		Report	Sanderson 11', 22'; Grant 23'; Ludlow 31'; Carney 48'	Stadium: Adams Arena

30 July 2006	SC Sand	1–2	Arsenal	Willstätt
11:00 CET	Renner 60'	Report	Grant 44'; Larkin 80'	Stadium: Adams Arena

03 August 2006	Crystal Palace Reserves	0–4	Arsenal	Hatfield
		Report	Grant; Marsh; Davison; Gallagher	Stadium: Queenswood

10 August 2006	Arsenal	3–0	Musashigaoka	Hatfield
	Sanderson 1'; Ludlow 35'; Kerr 72'	Report		Stadium: Queenswood

13 August 2006	Arsenal	6–0	Millwall Lionesses	Hatfield
14:00 BST	Davison; Buet; Yankey; Ludlow; Sanderson	Report		Stadium: Queenswood

17 August 2006	Nottingham Forest	0–7	Arsenal	Mapperley
19:00 BST		Report	Smith 4', 42', 50', 60' (pen.); Chapman 30'; Davison 75'; Ludlow 88'	Stadium: Plains Road

== Competitions ==
=== Overall record ===
Competition	First match	Last match	Starting round	Final position	Record							
Competition	First match	Last match	Starting round	Final position	Pld	W	D	L	GF	GA	GD	Win %
FA Women's Premier League National Division	20 August 2006	20 May 2007	Matchday 1	Winners	22	22	0	0	119	10	+109	100.00
FA Women's Cup	7 January 2007	7 May 2007	Fourth round	Winners	5	5	0	0	30	3	+27	100.00
FA Women's Premier League Cup	8 October 2006	4 March 2007	First round	Winners	5	5	0	0	21	2	+19	100.00
UEFA Women's Cup	12 September 2006	29 April 2007	Second qualifying round	Winners	9	7	2	0	27	7	+20	77.78
FA Women's Community Shield	2 August 2006		Final	Winners	1	1	0	0	3	0	+3	100.00
London County Cup	24 January 2007	16 April 2007	Quarter-finals	Winners	3	3	0	0	6	0	+6	100.00
Total					45	43	2	0	206	22	+184	95.56

Last updated: 24 May 2026
Source: FA WPL

=== FA Women's Community Shield ===
2 August 2006	Arsenal	3–0	Everton	Crewe
20:05 BST	Smith 23'; Chapman 31'; Davison 90+3'	Report	Easton (yellow card) 44'	Stadium: Gresty Road; Attendance: 2,604; Referee: Saša Ihringová

=== FA Women's Premier League National Division ===
==== Partial league table ====
Pos	Team	Pld	W	D	L	GF	GA	GD	Pts	Qualification or relegation
1	Arsenal (C)	22	22	0	0	119	10	+109	66	Qualification for the UEFA Cup qualifying round (Note: Because Arsenal won the 2006-07 European Cup, Everton qualified as League runner-up.)
2	Everton	22	17	1	4	56	15	+41	52	Qualification for the UEFA Cup qualifying round
3	Charlton Athletic	22	16	2	4	63	32	+31	50	
4	Bristol Academy	22	13	1	8	53	41	+12	40	
5	Leeds United	22	12	1	9	50	44	+6	37	

Source: FA WPL
(C) Champions

==== Results Summary ====
Overall								Home						Away					
Pld	W	D	L	GF	GA	GD	Pts	W	D	L	GF	GA	GD	W	D	L	GF	GA	GD
22	22	0	0	119	10	+109	66	11	0	0	55	4	+51	11	0	0	64	6	+58

==== Results by matchday ====
Matchday	1	2	3	4	5	6	7	8	9	10	11	12	13	14	15	16	17	18	19	20	21	22
Ground	A	H	A	A	A	H	H	H	A	A	H	A	H	A	H	A	A	H	A	H	H	H
Result	W	W	W	W	W	W	W	W	W	W	W	W	W	W	W	W	W	W	W	W	W	W
Position	1	1	1	1	1	1	3	1	1	1	1	1	1	1	1	1	1	1	1	1	1	1

Source: FA WPL
W = Win; D = Draw; L = Loss

==== Matches ====
20 August 2006 1	Blackburn Rovers	0–3	Arsenal	Brockhall Village
14:00 BST		Report	Smith 30', 66'; Fleeting 78'	Stadium: Blackburn Rovers Training Ground

27 August 2006 2	Arsenal	14–0	Fulham	Borehamwood
14:00 BST	Sanderson 2', 45', 60', 73', 89'; Carney 15', 58'; Smith 21', 27', 61'; Chapman 32', 51', 53'; Asante 63'	Report		Stadium: Meadow Park; Attendance: 271

3 September 2006 3	Bristol Academy	0–6	Arsenal	Kenn
14:00 BST		Report	Ludlow; Sanderson; Smith; Fleeting	Stadium: Hand Stadium

4 October 2006 4	Fulham	0–9	Arsenal	Burnham
19:45 BST		Report	Davison 5', 47'; Chapman 30'; Sanderson 35'; Yankey 42'; Ludlow 60', 80'; Carney 75', 83'	Stadium: The 1878 Stadium

22 October 2006 5	Everton	1–4	Arsenal	Crosby
14:00 BST	Williams 82' (pen.)	Report	Fleeting 4', 62'; Smith 42'; Sanderson 90' (pen.)	Stadium: Rossett Park

29 October 2006 6	Arsenal	6–0	Sunderland	Borehamwood
14:00 BST	Yankey 2', 22'; Sanderson 20', 37', 67'; Carney 62'	Report		Stadium: Meadow Park; Attendance: 350

17 December 2006 7	Arsenal	4–0	Blackburn Rovers	Borehamwood
14:00 GMT	Ludlow 17', 24', 75'; Fleeting 52'	Report		Stadium: Meadow Park

11 January 2007 8	Arsenal	1–0	Birmingham City	Borehamwood
14:00 GMT	Bassett 52' (o.g.)	Report		Stadium: Meadow Park

14 January 2007 9	Sunderland	0–9	Arsenal	Washington
14:00 GMT		Report	Smith 1'; Ludlow 10', 87', 89'; Chapman 40'; Carney 45'; A. Scott 52'; Sanderson 63'; Davison 76'	Stadium: Albany Park

21 January 2007 10	Cardiff City	1–6	Arsenal	Cardiff
14:00 GMT	Harries 30'	Report	Smith 15' (pen.); Sanderson 20', 50'; Chapman 45', 55'; Yankey 85'	Stadium: Cardiff Athletic Stadium

25 February 2007 11	Arsenal	4–0	Cardiff City	Hoddesdon
14:00 GMT	Carney 14'; Smith 49'; Chapman 50'; A. Scott 72'	Report		Stadium: Stewart Edward Stadium
Note: The game took place at Hoddesdon Town FC due to unplayable conditions at Boreham Wood

28 February 2007 12	Doncaster Rovers Belles	0–4	Arsenal	Doncaster
19:30 GMT		Report	Yankey; Smith; Sanderson	Stadium: Keepmoat Stadium

22 March 2007 13	Arsenal	4–1	Bristol Academy	Borehamwood
19:45 GMT	Sanderson 1', 82'; Chapman 5'; Yankey 11'	Report	Yorston 41' (pen.)	Stadium: Meadow Park

25 March 2007 14	Leeds United	1–8	Arsenal	Garforth
14:00 GMT	Clarke 20'	Report	A. Scott 5'; Sanderson 9', 33', 41' (pen.); Carney 12'; Smith 15'; Yankey 56', 80'	Stadium: Wheatley Park

29 March 2007 15	Arsenal	3–0	Charlton Athletic	Borehamwood
19:45 GMT	Sanderson 56'; Fleeting 75'; Ludlow 90' (yellow card)	Report	Murphy (yellow card) 29'; Stoney (yellow card) 67'	Stadium: Meadow Park; Referee: Carl Henry

5 April 2007 16	Charlton Athletic	2–9	Arsenal	Gravesend
19:45 BST	Dowie 16', 20'; Sinclair-Chambers (yellow card) 28' (yellow-red card) 85'	Report	Sanderson 23'; Chapman 34', 56'; Smith 38', 80'; Yankey 69'; Fleeting 81', 88'; Larkin 86'	Stadium: Stonebridge Road

8 April 2007 17	Birmingham City	0–1	Arsenal	Redditch
14:00 BST		Report	Ludlow 85'	Stadium: Valley Stadium

15 April 2007 18	Arsenal	7–0	Doncaster Rovers Belles	Borehamwood
14:00 BST	Carney 10'; Fleeting 18', 25', 75', 89'; Sanderson 50'; Ludlow 73'	Report		Stadium: Meadow Park

24 April 2007 19	Chelsea	1–5	Arsenal	East Molesey
19:30 BST	Clarke 42'	Report	Sanderson 2', 62'; Yankey 4'; Chapman 25', 80'	Stadium: Imber Court

2 May 2007 20	Arsenal	3–1	Chelsea	Borehamwood
19:30 BST	Sanderson 2', 40'; White 34'	Report	Edwards 78'	Stadium: Meadow Park

9 May 2007 21	Arsenal	3–2	Everton	Holloway, London
13:30 BST	Sanderson 7'; Smith 53', 85'	Report	Unitt 31'; 69' (o.g.)	Stadium: Emirates Stadium

20 May 2007 22	Arsenal	6–0	Leeds United	London Colney
13:00 BST	Smith 1', 58', 77'; Ludlow 30'; Sanderson 50'; Davison 75'	Report		Stadium: Arsenal Training Centre

=== FA Women's Cup ===
7 January 2007 Fourth round	Stockport County	1–4	Arsenal	Stockport
13:00 GMT	Johnston 56' (yellow card) (yellow-red card) 75'	Report	Chapman 40'; Smith 64', 82' (pen.); A. Scott 78'	Stadium: Neil Rourke Memorial Stadium

4 February 2007 Fifth round	Arsenal	14–1	Reading Royals	Borehamwood
13:00 GMT	Sanderson 6'; Davison; Ludlow; Asante; Flaherty; Yankey; Larkin	Report	Caswell 86'	Stadium: Meadow Park

11 February 2007 Quarter-finals	Arsenal	6–0	Birmingham City	Borehamwood
12:00 GMT	Ludlow 6', 34'; Carney 10'; Chapman 64'; Sanderson 71', 82'	Report		Stadium: Meadow Park

18 March 2007 Semi-finals	Bristol Academy	0–2	Arsenal	Bristol
15:00 GMT		Report	Chapman 27'; Ludlow 36'	Stadium: Memorial Ground; Attendance: 1,212

7 May 2007 Final	Arsenal	4–1	Charlton Athletic	Nottingham
13:00 BST	Smith 7', 80'; Ludlow 15', 45+1'	Report	Holtham 2'; Bertelli (yellow card) 7'	Stadium: City Ground; Attendance: 24,529; Referee: Anthony Bates

=== FA Women's Premier League Cup ===
8 October 2006 First round	Arsenal	4–1	Doncaster Rovers Belles	Borehamwood
14:00 GMT	Fleeting 1', 5', 87'; Yankey 48'	Report	Exley 25' (pen.)	Stadium: Meadow Park

15 October 2006 Second round	Arsenal	3–0	Birmingham City	Borehamwood
14:00 GMT	Davison 21'; Fleeting 50', 90'	Report		Stadium: Meadow Park

19 November 2006 Quarter-finals	Arsenal	9–0	Nottingham Forest	Borehamwood
14:00 GMT	Sanderson 4'; Chapman 9', 59'; Smith 29'; Yankey; Larkin	Report		Stadium: Meadow Park

10 December 2006 Semi-finals	Arsenal	4–1	Chelsea	Borehamwood
12:00 BST	Fleeting 5', 13', 65'; Grant 60'	Report	E. White 75'	Stadium: Meadow Park; Attendance: 266

4 March 2007 Final	Leeds United	0–1	Arsenal	Scunthorpe
14:30 GMT		Report	Ludlow 90+2'	Stadium: Glanford Park; Attendance: 3,688; Referee: D Roberts

=== London County Cup ===
24 January 2007 Quarter-finals	Arsenal	4–0	West Ham United	Potters Bar
14:00 GMT	Daniels; Gurr; Buet	Report		Stadium: The Lantern Stadium

18 February 2007 Semi-finals	Arsenal	w/o	AFC Wimbledon	Potters Bar
14:00 GMT		Report		Stadium: Lantern Community Stadium
Note: Game was never played. Arsenal given a w/o

16 April 2007 Final	Millwall Lionesses	0–2	Arsenal	Dagenham
19:30 BST		Report	Smith	Stadium: Victoria Road

=== UEFA Women's Cup ===
==== Second round qualifying ====
Pos	Team	Pld	W	D	L	GF	GA	GD	Pts	Qualification	ARS	BRØ	ROS	FEM
1	(England) Arsenal	3	3	0	0	12	4	+8	9	Advance to quarter-finals	—	1–0	5–4	–
2	(Denmark) Brøndby	3	2	0	1	7	3	+4	6	Advance to quarter-finals	–	—	2–1	5–1
3	(Russia) Rossiyanka (H)	3	1	0	2	9	9	0	3		–	–	—	4–2
4	(Hungary) Femina	3	0	0	3	3	15	−12	0		0–6	–	–	—

Source: RSSSF
(H) Hosts

12 September 2006 1	Arsenal (England)	5–4	(Russia) Rossiyanka	Krasnoarmeysk
14:00 BST	Fleeting 1', 21', 42', 49', 64'	Report	Morozova 4'; Barbashina 51'; Poryadina (yellow card) 62'; Verezubova 68'; Letyushova 85'	Stadium: Stadion Rossiyanka

14 September 2006 2	Femina (Hungary)	0–6	(England) Arsenal	Krasnoarmeysk
13:00 BST	Benkö (yellow card) 63'; Kovesi (red card) 78'	Report	Paraoanu 21' (o.g.); Ludlow 22', 72'; A. Scott (yellow card) 58'; Chapman 61'; Yankey (yellow card) 59' (goal) 67'; Sanderson (penalty missed) 78'; Davison 79'	Stadium: Stadion Rossiyanka

17 September 2006 3	Arsenal (England)	1–0	(Denmark) Brøndby	Shchyolkovo
12:00 BST	Sanderson 48'	Report		Stadium: Podmoskovie Stadium

==== Knockout Phase ====
===== Quarter-finals =====
12 October 2006 First leg	Breiðablik (Iceland)	0–5	(England) Arsenal	Kópavogur
16:00 BST	Helgadóttir (yellow card) 79'	Report	Smith 32', 67'; Sanderson 70'; Fleeting 75', 79'	Stadium: Kópavogsvöllur; Attendance: 942; Referee: Floarea Cristina Ionescu (Romania)

19 October 2006 Second leg	Arsenal (England)	4–1 (9–1 agg.)	(Iceland) Breiðablik	Borehamwood
19:30 BST	Fleeting 7'; Smith 24'; Carney 85'; Yankey 89'	Report	Bjornsdottir 68'; Magnúsdóttir (yellow card) 74'	Stadium: Meadow Park; Referee: Jenny Palmqvist (Sweden)

===== Semi-finals =====
4 November 2006 First leg	Brøndby (Denmark)	2–2	(England) Arsenal	Brøndby
13:00 GMT	Pape 16'; L. Jensen 59'; Werming (yellow card) 69'	Report	Smith 9', 51' (yellow card) 79' (yellow-red card) 79'	Stadium: Brøndby Stadium; Attendance: 628; Referee: Claudine Brohet (Belgium)

11 November 2006 Second leg	Arsenal (England)	3–0 (5–2 agg.)	(Denmark) Brøndby	Borehamwood
15:00 GMT	Yankey (yellow card) 33' (goal) 33'; Carney 53'; Fleeting (yellow card) 44' (goal) 90'	Report	Paaske Sørensen (yellow card) 8'; Falk (yellow card) 56'	Stadium: Meadow Park; Referee: Natalia Avdonchenko (Russia)

===== Final =====
21 April 2007 First leg	Umeå (Sweden)	0–1	(England) Arsenal	Umeå
14:00 BST		Report	Ludlow (yellow card) 15'; A. Scott 90+1'	Stadium: Gammliavallen; Attendance: 6,265; Referee: Christine Beck (Germany)

29 April 2007 Second leg	Arsenal (England)	0–0 (1–0 agg.)	(Sweden) Umeå	Borehamwood
14:00 BST	Phillip (yellow card) 77'; Ludlow (yellow card) 87'	Report		Stadium: Meadow Park; Attendance: 3,467; Referee: Nicole Petignat (Switzerland)

== See also ==
- List of Arsenal W.F.C. seasons
- 2006–07 in English football
