= 2006–07 FA Women's Cup =

Tournament details
- Country: England; Wales
- Teams: 242

Final positions
- Champions: Arsenal
- Runners-up: Charlton Athletic
- Penalty shoot-outs do not count towards the total number of goals.

The 2006–07 FA Women's Cup was an association football knockout tournament for women's teams, held between 10 September 2006 and 7 May 2007. It was the 37th season of the FA Women's Cup and was won by Arsenal, who defeated Charlton Athletic in the final. The tournament consisted of a preliminary round, four qualifying rounds and eight rounds of competition proper.

The competition began on 10 September 2006 when the 134 lowest–ranked teams in the tournament took part in the preliminary round.

All match results and dates from the Women's FA Cup Website.

== Preliminary round ==
All games were played on 10 September 2006

Tie	Home team (tier)	Score	Away team (tier)	Att.
1	Acton Sports Club	4–2	Hemel Hempstead Town	
2	AFC Telford United	0–2	Shrewsbury Town	
3	Aldershot Town	3–2	Salisbury City	
4	Barking	1–3	Sawbridgeworth Town	
5	Bedford	3–1	Arlesey Town	
6	Bexhill United	2–4	Horley Town	
7	Bilton Ajax	0–4	Stoke City	
8	Bolton Ambassadors	1–7	Bradford City	
9	Braintree Town	5–1	Havant & Waterlooville	
10	Brentford	5–1	Chinnor	
11	Brighouse Town	2–8	York City	
12	Burnham	12–2	Brize Norton	
13	Buxton	1–3	Liverpool Manweb Feds	
14	C&K Basildon	1–8	London Colney	
15	Cambridge University	8–2	Sophtlogic	
16	Carterton	0–1	Aylesbury United	
17	Christchurch	2–8	Woking	
18	Colchester Town	1–6	Chelmsford City	
19	Cottenham United	6–1	Leighton Linslade	
20	Darwen	4–3	Mossley Hill	
21	Dover Athletic	6–1	Upper Beeding	
22	Dudley United	2–3	Walsall	
23	Eastbourne Borough	4–2	Kent Magpies	
24	Eastbourne Town	2–0	Tooting & Mitcham United	
25	Gravesend & Northfleet	3–0	Abbey Rangers	
26	Great Berry	4–3	Hoddesdon Owls	
27	Hampton	4–5	Newport Pagnell Town	
28	Haringey Borough	5–6 (a.e.t.)	Tower Hamlets	
29	Harlow Athletic	3–4	Saffron Walden Town	
30	Hassocks	3–6	London Women	
31	Haverhill Rovers	5–1	Woodbridge Town	
32	Haywards Heath Town	0–3	Crowborough Athletic	
33	Kingsthorpe	1–8	Corby Stewarts & Lloyds	
34	Lewes	13–0	Corinthian Casuals	

Tie	Home team (tier)	Score	Away team (tier)	Att.
35	Lloyds S&S	3–2	Crystal Palace	
36	London Corinthians	1–3	The Comets	
37	Lordswood	1–4 (a.e.t.)	Sheerness East	
38	Loughborough Foxes	1–5	Friar Lane & Epworth	
39	Macclesfield Town	0–5	Sheffield	
40	Maldon Town	2–3	Royston Town	
41	Mansfield Road	0–3	Beaconsfield SYCOB	
42	Mansfield Town	1–6	Solihull	
43	MK Wanderers	5–3	Banbury United	
44	Morley Spurs	2–1	Barnsley	
45	Newfield	4–5 (a.e.t.)	Glendale	
46	Oadby Town	0–1	Worcester City	
47	Oxford United	1–6	Wycombe Wanderers	
48	Reading	6–1	Battersea & Wandsworth	
49	Rothwell Town	4–3	Cambridge Rangers	
50	Rushcliffe Eagles	2–4	Linby CW	
51	Sandiacre Town	2–0	Birmingham Athletic	
52	Shepshed Dynamo	2–1	Stratford Town	
53	Southam United	0–11	Leicester City	
54	St Blazey	4–6	Alphington	
55	Staines Town	2–1	Riverside Strikers	
56	Steel City Wanderers	4–0	Denton Town	
57	Stevenage	2–1 (a.e.t.)	Met	
58	AFC Team Bath	0–5	Bath City	
59	Thurrock & Tilbury	2–1	Billericay Town	
60	Tottenham Hotspur	2–5 (a.e.t.)	Garston	
61	Tring Athletic	5–2	Dynamo North London	
62	UKP	2–4	Ashford	
63	Wigan	7–0	Bury Girls & Ladies	
64	Windscale	5–0	Redcar Town	
65	Wingate & Finchley	11–0	Runwell Hospital	
66	Wyrley	1–1 (?–? p)	Bourne United	
67	Yeovil Town	1–3	Gloucester City	

== First round qualifying ==
All games were played on 24 September and 1 October 2006.

Tie	Home team (tier)	Score	Away team (tier)	Att.
1	AFC Kempston Rovers	0–8	Peterborough Azure	
2	Alphington	3–1	Ilminster Town	
3	Aylesbury United	0–2	Wycombe Wanderers	
4	Barnstaple Town	2–3	Poole Town	
5	Blyth Spartans	4–1	Glendale	
6	Bourne United	1–4	Friar Lane & Epworth	
7	Bradford City	3–2 (a.e.t.)	Wigan	
8	Brentford	0–3	Reading	
9	Brentwood Town	1–7	Chelmsford City	
10	Burnham	0–4	Beaconsfield SYCOB	
11	Chichester City	1–0	Staines Town	
12	Corby Stewarts & Lloyds	2–3 (a.e.t.)	Bedford	
13	Crowborough Athletic	1–5	London Women	
14	Durham City	2–3	Penrith AFC	
15	Eastbourne Town	2–1	Ashford	
16	Forest Hall	5–0	Gateshead Cleveland Hall	
17	Garston	4–1	Stevenage	
18	Gloucester City	10–0	Launceston	
19	Godmanchester Rovers	1–3	Cottenham United	
20	Great Berry	0–4	Acton Sports Club	
21	Haverhill Rovers	4–3	Cambridge University	
22	Horley Town	1–3	Sheerness East	
23	Kings Sports Luton	0–2	Peterborough Sports	
24	Laverstock & Ford	0–5	Andover New Street	
25	Leicester City	15–0	Linby CW	

Tie	Home team (tier)	Score	Away team (tier)	Att.
26	Lewes	9–1	Eastbourne Borough	
27	Lloyds S&S	3–1	Dover Athletic	
28	London Colney	4–2	Tower Hamlets	
29	Lumley	5–2	Brandon United	
30	MK Wanderers	4–1	Newport Pagnell Town	
31	Morley Spurs	5–2	Liverpool Manweb Feds	
32	Newbury	2–4	Havant & Waterlooville	
33	Penzance	7–1	Tetbury Town	
34	Rothwell Town	2–5	Kettering Town	
35	Royston Town	7–1	Saffron Walden Town	
36	Saltash United	0–3	Holway United	
37	Sandiacre Town	2–6	Copsewood Coventry	
38	Sawbridgeworth Town	1–0	Thurrock & Tilbury	
39	Sheffield	0–2 (a.e.t.)	Darwen	
40	Shepshed Dynamo	4–3	Worcester City	
41	St Ives Town	1–13	Bath City	
42	Stoke City	3–1	Shrewsbury Town	
43	The Comets	1–5	Gravesend & Northfleet	
44	Tring Athletic	5–1	Braintree Town	
45	Walsall	2–0	Solihull	
46	Whitley Bay	4–1	Darlington Railway Athletic	
47	Windscale	9–0	Consett	
48	Wingate & Finchley	0–1	Dagenham & Redbridge	
49	Woking	0–6	Aldershot Town	
50	York City	2–2 (?–? p)	Steel City Wanderers	

== Second round qualifying ==
All games were played on 8 October 2006.

Tie	Home team (tier)	Score	Away team (tier)	Att.
1	Acton Sports Club	5–1	Royston Town	
2	Aldershot Town	7–2	Andover New Street	
3	Beaconsfield SYCOB	1–1 (?–? p)	Wycombe Wanderers	
4	Chichester City	4–2	Havant & Waterlooville	
5	Cottenham United	0–8	Kettering Town	
6	Dagenham & Redbridge	3–0 (?–? p)	Sawbridgeworth Town	
7	Darwen	2–2	Bradford City	
8	Forest Hall	2–4	Penrith AFC	
9	Friar Lane & Epworth	2–1	Shepshed Dynamo	
10	Garston	6–0	Chelmsford City	
11	Gloucester City	4–0	Bath City	
12	Haverhill Rovers	2–1	Bedford	

Tie	Home team (tier)	Score	Away team (tier)	Att.
13	Holway United	1–2 (a.e.t.)	Penzance	
14	Leicester City	3–1	Copsewood Coventry	
15	Lewes	11–0	Eastbourne Town	
16	London Colney	4–3 (a.e.t.)	Tring Athletic	
17	London Women	7–2	Lloyds S&S	
18	Peterborough Sports	0–1	Peterborough Azure	
19	Poole Town	2–1	Alphington	
20	Reading	8–1	MK Wanderers	
21	Sheerness East	0–9	Gravesend & Northfleet	
22	Stoke City	1–2	Walsall	
23	Whitley Bay	1–1 (5–4 p)	Lumley	
24	Windscale	2–1	Blyth Spartans	
25	York City	3–2	Morley Spurs	

== First round proper ==
All games were scheduled for 29 October 2006.

Tie	Home team (tier)	Score	Away team (tier)	Att.
1	Acton Sports Club	3–1 (a.e.t.)	Chesham United	
2	AFC Bournemouth	0–3	Plymouth Argyle	
3	Blackpool Wren Rovers	1–4	Scunthorpe United	
4	Bradford City	0–6	Rotherham United	
5	Chester City	2–3	Salford	
6	Chesterfield	2–3	Penrith AFC	
7	Chichester City	3–0	Aldershot Town	
8	Coventry City	3–1 (a.e.t.)	Lichfield Diamonds	
9	Dagenham & Redbridge	3–4	Leyton Orient	
10	Derby County	5–1	Walsall	
11	Enfield Town	2–0	Reading	
12	Friar Lane & Epworth	0–3	Norwich City	
13	Frome Town	6–1	Poole Town	
14	Garston	2–1	London Women	
15	Gloucester City	2–4 (a.e.t.)	Newquay	
16	Gravesend & Northfleet	2–3	Gillingham	

Tie	Home team (tier)	Score	Away team (tier)	Att.
17	Ipswich Town	5–0	Haverhill Rovers	
18	Kettering Town	0–5	Rushden & Diamonds	
19	Leicester City	5–1	Alfreton Town	
20	Lewes	2–3	Queens Park Rangers	
21	Luton Town	4–0	London Colney	
22	Oxford City	1–6	Colchester United	
23	Penzance	4–2 (a.e.t.)	Swindon Town	
24	Peterborough Azure	1–1 (?–? p)	Northampton Town	
25	South Durham Royals	3–2	Hull City	
26	The New Saints & Shrewsbury Town	1–6	Leafield Athletic	
27	Whitehawk	1–2	Langford	
28	Whitley Bay	3–0	Peterlee RA	
29	Windscale	0–5	Leeds City Vixens	
30	Winscombe	1–2	Forest Green Rovers	
31	Wycombe Wanderers	0–5	Bedford Town Bells	
32	York City	0–4	Sheffield Wednesday	

== Second round proper ==
All games were originally scheduled for 12 November 2006.

Tie	Home team (tier)	Score	Away team (tier)	Att.
1	Bedford Town Bells	3–2	Acton Sports Club	
2	Colchester United	7–2	Gillingham	
3	Coventry City	1–0	Rushden & Diamonds	
4	Forest Green Rovers	3–1	Penzance	
5	Frome Town	3–1	Chichester City	
6	Leeds City Vixens	4–0	South Durham Royals	
7	Leicester City	4–4 (?–? p)	Ipswich Town	
8	Leyton Orient	0–2	Langford	
9	Luton Town	1–3 (a.e.t.)	Enfield Town	
10	Newquay	4–0	Plymouth Argyle	
11	Norwich City	1–2	Leafield Athletic	
12	Peterborough Azure	2–2 (3–4 p)	Derby County	
13	Queens Park Rangers	5–0	Garston	
14	Rotherham United	4–2	Salford	
15	Scunthorpe United	1–3	Sheffield Wednesday	
16	Whitley Bay	2–0	Penrith AFC	

== Third round proper ==
All games were originally scheduled for 3, 10 and 17 December 2006.

Tie	Home team (tier)	Score	Away team (tier)	Att.
1	AFC Wimbledon	2–1	Crystal Palace	
2	Aston Villa	3–1	Ipswich Town	
3	Brighton & Hove Albion	1–2	Millwall Lionesses	
4	Bristol City	2–1	Keynsham Town	
5	Colchester United	3–2 (a.e.t.)	Bedford Town Bells	
6	Coventry City	0–2	Wolverhampton Wanderers	
7	Crewe Alexandra	1–3 (a.e.t.)	Tranmere Rovers	
8	Derby County	0–2	Lincoln City	
9	Enfield Town	2–3	Langford	
10	Frome Town	2–1	Newquay	

Tie	Home team (tier)	Score	Away team (tier)	Att.
11	Liverpool	2–0	Leeds City Vixens	
12	Nottingham Forest	5–0	Leafield Athletic	
13	Portsmouth	0–2	Reading Royals	
14	Preston North End	1–3	Newcastle United	
15	Queens Park Rangers	0–1	West Ham United	
16	Sheffield Wednesday	3–5 (a.e.t.)	Manchester City	
17	Southampton Saints	2–0	Forest Green Rovers	
18	Stockport County	3–0	Curzon Ashton	
19	Watford	4–2	Barnet	
20	Whitley Bay	2–1 (a.e.t.)	Rotherham United	

== Fourth round proper ==
All games were originally scheduled for 7 and 14 and 28 January 2007.

7 January 2007	Blackburn Rovers (1)	3–0	AFC Wimbledon (2)	Clitheroe
	Anderton 47'; Bell 56', 78'	Report		Stadium: EcoGiants Stadium; Attendance: 95; Referee: E Everson (Leeds)

7 January 2007	Chelsea (1)	2–1	Doncaster Rovers Belles (1)	East Molesey
	Clarke 21'; White 63'	Report	Exley 36'	Stadium: Imber Court

7 January 2007	Frome Town (3)	3–7	Nottingham Forest (2)	Frome
	Goal	Report	Goal	Stadium: Badgers Hill; Referee: J Kingwell (Exeter)

7 January 2007	Langford (3)	2–1 (a.e.t.)	Southampton Saints (2)	Welwyn Garden City
	Goal	Report	Goal	Stadium: Herns Way

7 January 2007	Newcastle United (2)	0–4	Watford (2)	Newcastle upon Tyne
		Report	Goal	Stadium: Scotswood

7 January 2007	Reading Royals (2)	3–2	Lincoln City (2)	Sandhurst
	Goal	Report	Goal	Stadium: Bottom Meadow

7 January 2007	Stockport County (3)	1–4	Arsenal (1)	Stockport
	Johnston 56'	Report	Chapman 40'; K. Smith 64', 82' (pen.); A. Scott 78'	Stadium: Neil Rourke Memorial Stadium

7 January 2007	Sunderland (1)	1–3	Leeds United (1)	Houghton-le-Spring
	Redhead 15'	Report	Wright 40'; McArthur 44'; Ward 48'	Stadium: Houghton-Le-Spring Cricket Club

7 January 2007	Whitley Bay (3)	1–2 (a.e.t.)	Tranmere Rovers (2)	Whitley Bay
	Goal	Report	115'	Stadium: Hillheads Park

7 January 2007	Wolverhampton Wanderers (2)	2–3	Liverpool (2)	Bilston
	Goal	Report	Goal	Stadium: Queen Street Stadium

14 January 2007	Aston Villa (1)	0–1	Colchester United (3)	Sutton Coldfield
		Report	Porter 63'	Stadium: Central Ground

14 January 2007	Birmingham City (1)	3–1	Manchester City (2)	Redditch
	Ward; Bird; Gauntlett	Report	Belcher	Stadium: Valley Stadium

14 January 2007	Charlton Athletic (1)	8–0	West Ham United (2)	Northfleet
	Holtham 3', 6'; Hickmott 25'; Stoney 40'; Potter 68'; Murphy 75'; Ritchie 77'; Heatherson 79'	Report		Stadium: Stonebridge Road

14 January 2007	Millwall Lionesses (2)	0–6	Everton (1)	Carshalton
		Report	Westwood; Evans; J. Scott; F. Williams (pen.); Handley; McDougall (pen.)	Stadium: War Memorial Sports Ground

14 January 2007	Fulham (1)	1–2	Cardiff City (1)	Burnham
	C. Williams	Report	Harries; Fishlock	Stadium: The 1878 Stadium

28 January 2007	Bristol Academy (1)	3–1 (a.e.t.)	Bristol City (2)	Almondsbury
	Yorsten 71'; Bartlett 97'; Green 112'	Report	Miles 50'	Stadium: Oaklands Park

== Fifth round proper ==
All games were played on 28 January and 4 February 2007.

28 January 2007	Colchester United (3)	0–5	Birmingham City (1)	Heybridge
		Report	Bird; McCann; Bassett; Scheuber	Stadium: Scraley Road

28 January 2007	Blackburn Rovers (1)	3–2	Chelsea (1)	Clitheroe
	Bell; Anderton	Report	Eadie 1' (o.g.); Brewer 5' (o.g.)	Stadium: Shawbridge; Referee: G Etchells (Cheshire)

28 January 2007	Liverpool (2)	3–0	Watford (2)	Prescot
	Byrne; Parry; James	Report		Stadium: Valerie Park

4 February 2007	Arsenal (1)	14–1	Reading Royals (2)	Borehamwood
	Sanderson; Davison; Ludlow; Asante; Flaherty; Yankey; Larkin	Report	Caswell 86'	Stadium: Meadow Park

4 February 2007	Cardiff City (1)	1–2	Leeds United (1)	Cardiff
	Harries	Report	Emmanuel; S. Smith	Stadium: Cardiff Athletics Stadium

4 February 2007	Nottingham Forest (2)	0–4	Charlton Athletic (1)	Nottingham
		Report	Aluko 29'; Ritchie 45', 60'; Potter 62'	Stadium: Ron Steel Sports Ground

4 February 2007	Langford (3)	0–4	Everton (1)	Welwyn Garden City
		Report	McDougall 40'; Handley; F. Williams	Stadium: Herns Lane

4 February 2007	Bristol Academy (1)	3–1	Tranmere Rovers (2)	Clevedon
	Curtis; Jones; Green	Report	Kenwright	Stadium: Hand Stadium

== Quarter–finals ==
All games were played on 11 and 18 February 2007.

11 February 2007	Arsenal (1)	6–0	Birmingham City (1)	Borehamwood
	Ludlow 6', 34'; Carney 10'; Chapman 64'; Sanderson 71', 82'	Report		Stadium: Meadow Park

11 February 2007	Blackburn Rovers (1)	2–1	Leeds United (1)	Clitheroe
	Anderton 55', 60'	Report	McArthur 20'	Stadium: Shawbridge

11 February 2007	Charlton Athletic (1)	1–0	Everton (1)	Northfleet
	Dowie 47'	Report		Stadium: Stonebridge Road

18 February 2007	Liverpool (2)	0–1	Bristol Academy (1)	Prescot
		Report	Jones 59'	Stadium: Valerie Park

== Semi–finals ==
All games were played on 18 March 2007.

18 March 2007	Blackburn Rovers (1)	0–1	Charlton Athletic (1)	Accrington
		Report	Dowie 53'	Stadium: Crown Ground; Attendance: 758

18 March 2007	Bristol Academy (1)	0–2	Arsenal (1)	Bristol
15:00 GMT		Report	Chapman 27'; Ludlow 36'	Stadium: Memorial Ground; Attendance: 1,212

== Final ==
7 May 2007

Arsenal	4–1	Charlton Athletic
K. Smith 7', 80'; Ludlow 15', 45'	Report	Holtham 2'

City Ground, Nottingham
Attendance: 24,529
Referee: Anthony Bates (Staffordshire)
