= 2007 FA Women's Premier League Cup final =

English football cup final

Leeds United	Arsenal
0	1
- Date: 4 March 2007
- Venue: Glanford Park, Scunthorpe
- Player of the Match: Sophie Bradley
- Referee: D Roberts
- Attendance: 3,688

The 2007 FA Women's Premier League Cup final was the 16th final of the FA Women's Premier League Cup, England's main women's league cup competition before it was replaced by the FA WSL Cup in 2011. It took place on 4th March 2007. The finalists were Arsenal who defeated Chelsea 4–1 in their semi-final, against Leeds United who beat Charlton Athletic 4–3 on penalties after a 2–2 draw.

Arsenal won the match 1–0 after Jayne Ludlow scored the winner in stoppage time, and Leeds's Sophie Bradley was named Player of the Match.

The final was played at Glanford Park, Scunthorpe, for the first time. Glanford Park would go on to host the 2009 final as well, also featuring Arsenal.

== Road to the final ==
Both teams faced four clubs in their route to the final.

=== Leeds United ===
Round	Leeds United	
Round	Opposition	Score
1st	Cardiff City (H)	4–0
2nd	Barnet (H)	2–0
3rd	Millwall Lionesses (H)	2–1
4th	Charlton Athletic (A)	2–2 (4–3 p)
Key: (H) = Home venue; (A) = Away venue

Leeds United were first handed a home tie against Cardiff City, where they walked away comfortable 4–0 victors with a brace from Karen Burke as well as a goal each for Susan Smith and Jessica Wright.

A second round home tie against Barnet saw Karen Burke repeat her brace to give Leeds a 2–0 victory.

The ensuing home quarter-final against Millwall proved somewhat more difficult, but goals from Karen Burke and Susan Smith saw Leeds walk away 2–1 victors.

Leeds faced Charlton Athletic away in the semi-final and took the lead through a Lucy Ward header, before the hosts drew level before half-time courtesy of Gemma Ritchie. Charlton took the lead in the 56th minute with a strike from Natasha Dowie before Leeds drew level in the 75th minute through Nicole Emmanuel. The game progressed to extra time but saw no more goals, leading to a penalty shootout. Emmanuel scored the winning penalty for Leeds to finish their route to the final.

=== Arsenal ===
Round	Arsenal	
Round	Opposition	Score
1st	Doncaster Rovers Belles (H)	4–1
2nd	Birmingham City (H)	3–0
3rd	Nottingham Forest (H)	9–0
4th	Chelsea (H)	4–1
Key: (H) = Home venue; (A) = Away venue

Arsenal first faced Doncaster Rovers at home, and ran out comfortable 4–1 victors courtesy of a hat-trick from Julie Fleeting and a goal from Rachel Yankey to overcome Doncaster's only goal from Vicky Exley.

Arsenal faced a second round home tie against Birmingham City, running out 3–0 victors by way of a Julie Fleeting brace and a goal from Gemma Davison.

The quarter-final saw Arsenal face Nottingham Forest at home, where they ran out 9–0 victors from a Lianne Sanderson hat-trick, two goals apiece from Katie Chapman and Kelly Smith, as well as a goal each from Sian Larkin and Rachel Yankey.

Facing London rivals Chelsea in the semi-final at home, Julie Fleeting scored twice in the opening 17 minutes, before Ciara Grant scored Arsenal's third, with Julie Fleeting completing her hat-trick in the 65th minute, to give Arsenal a 4–1 victory, overcoming Chelsea's only goal from former Arsenal youth player Ellen White in the 75th minute to send themselves to the final.

== Match ==
=== Team selection ===
Arsenal captain Faye White missed the game with injury, passing the captain's armband to Jayne Ludlow.

=== Summary ===
The match kicked off at 14:30 in front of a crowd of 3,688. Leeds took an early upper hand in a relatively even first half, but neither Leeds's Rachel McArthur or Arsenal's Jayne Ludlow could finish early chances. Ludlow struck the bar twice, and McArthur was unable to pounce on a poor clearance from Emma Byrne. Leeds substitute Jessica Clarke nearly provided Arsenal's Anita Asante a chance for goal with a misplaced backheel before both Kelly Smith and Karen Carney saw efforts cleared off the line. Arsenal eventually found the winning goal in the second minute of stoppage time, after a corner from Carney found Ludlow for a late volley to secure Arsenal's 9th competition victory.

=== Details ===
4 March 2007
14:30 GMT (UTC+00:00)

Leeds United	0–1	Arsenal
	Report	Ludlow 90+2'

Glanford Park, Scunthorpe
Attendance: 3,688
Referee: D Roberts

Leeds United	Arsenal

GK	(Scotland) Gemma Fay
DF	(England) Sophie Bradley
DF	(England) Alex Culvin
DF	(England) Jess Wright
DF	(England) Nicole Emmanuel
MF	(England) Rachel McArthur
MF	(England) Natalie Preston (c)
MF	(England) Sophie Walton
MF	(England) Karen Burke	(substituted off) 74'
FW	(England) Sue Smith
FW	(England) Lucy Ward	(substituted off) 64'
Substitutes:
DF	(England) Julie Grundy
MF	(England) Melissa Sutcliffe	(substituted on) 74'
MF	(England) Carla Tomkins
FW	(England) Sarah Owen
FW	(England) Jessica Clarke	(substituted on) 64'
Manager:
(England) Julie Chipchase

GK	1	(Republic of Ireland) Emma Byrne
DF	12	(England) Alex Scott
DF	23	(England) Mary Phillip
DF	18	(England) Anita Asante
MF	4	(Wales) Jayne Ludlow (c)
MF	17	(England) Katie Chapman
MF	7	(Republic of Ireland) Ciara Grant
MF	14	(England) Karen Carney
FW	8	(England) Kelly Smith
FW	9	(England) Lianne Sanderson	(substituted off) 66'
FW	11	(England) Rachel Yankey
Substitutes:
GK	24	(Jamaica) Rebecca Spencer
DF	26	(England) Gilly Flaherty
MF	20	(England) Gemma Davison
MF	16	(England) Sian Larkin
FW	10	(Scotland) Julie Fleeting	(substituted on) 66'
Manager:
(England) Vic Akers

Player of the Match:

Sophie Bradley (Leeds United)

Match rules
- 90 minutes
- 30 minutes of extra time if necessary
- Penalty shoot-out if scores still level
- Five named substitutes.
