= Mursell =

Mursell is an English surname. Notable people with this surname include the following:

- Rt Revd Gordon Mursell (born 1949), former bishop of Stafford in England
- James Mursell (1893–1963), American musicologist
- James C. Mursell (1860–1948), British philatelist
- Tom Mursell, English media spokesperson and youth entrepreneur

== See also ==
- George Garrett (composer) (full name George Mursell Garrett) (1834–1897), English organist and composer
- Revd James Phillippo (full name James Mursell Phillippo) (1798–1879), English Baptist missionary and abolitionist active in Jamaica
