= Yeardot =

Television series

- Genre: Documentary / Reality web-series
- Country of origin: United Kingdom
- No. of episodes: 15 (one year-long project)

Yeardot is a television and web production for Channel 4 by So Television and Holler. It began on 30 June 2008, and follows the lives of fifteen young people from across the United Kingdom as they go through a pivotal year in each of their lives. The project ended after 12 months at the end of June 2009.

== Introduction ==
The project took place both online at the Yeardot website as well as in a series of TV programmes on Channel 4 as part of their educational schedule. The fifteen participants set goals for themselves that they hoped to achieve over the following twelve months.

== Participants ==
Participants in the show are young people who are attempting to succeed in their chosen vocation or else are attempting to overcome some challenge. Included are Jamel Haynes, an ex-homeless man, who wants to stay off the streets; and Simon Jenkins, who hopes to progress as a comedian. Josh Muggleton has Asperger syndrome and hopes to complete a successful first year at the University of St Andrews. Also partaking are Isobella Hatwell, who hopes to stage her play Wasted; Gilly Flaherty, who plays defense premier league football for Arsenal L.F.C. and also plays for England; Claire Hazelgrove, who is a prospective Labour Party candidate for election, one of the youngest to do so; and Chloe Spiteri, an 18-year-old with severe learning difficulties who hopes to progress as a wrestler after winning the English junior championships in March 2008 as well as other young people (see list below).

=== List of participants ===
Participants in Yeardot
Name	Age	Occupation^{*}/Dream^{**}
Aaron Augustus	20	Dancer^{*}/Open Company^{**}
Nicolette Ester	16	Leaving home for boarding school^{*}
Gilly Flaherty	16	Plays football for Arsenal ladies^{*}and England
Isobella Hatwell	17	Playwright^{**}
Jamal Haynes	19	Stay off streets^{**}
Claire Hazelgrove	20	Labour Candidate^{*} for MP for Skipton and Ripon
Jade Heusen	18	Classical ballerina^{*} with major company^{**}
Simon Jenkins	20	Comedian^{*}
Sheila Lord	17	Singer/songwriter^{**}
Joshua Muggleton	19	Student and Autism speaker, writer and consultant^{*}
Tom Mursell	19	Entrepreneur^{*}
Akilah Russell	19	Print journalist^{**}
Chloe Spiteri	18	Olympic Wrestler^{**}
Deborah Stevenson	17	Poet^{*}

== Participant profiles ==
=== Claire Hazelgrove ===
Claire Ruth Hazelgrove (born 16 July 1988) was the prospective Labour candidate for parliamentary election for Skipton and Ripon. At time of selection she was the second youngest Parliamentary Candidate in party history, Emily Benn being the youngest. Hazelgrove studies Politics at the University of York and has volunteered for three years for Sally Keeble MP. If elected, she could have become the youngest ever MP since the Reform Act 1832. The current record holder is Esmond Harmsworth, elected on 15 November 1919 from Isle of Thanet, aged 21 years 170 days. The youngest female MP was, until 2015, Bernadette Devlin, elected on 17 April 1969 from Mid Ulster, aged 21 years 359 days. On 7 May 2015, Mhairi Black became the youngest ever female MP, and youngest MP since the Reform Act 1832, aged 20 years and 237 days old.

=== Josh Muggleton ===
Joshua Thomas Bailey Muggleton (born 1989, Surrey) is currently studying Psychology at the University of St Andrews in Scotland. Josh was diagnosed with Asperger syndrome, an autism spectrum disorder, in 2004, and is the youngest ever elected councillor of the National Autistic Society. He talks and lectures widely to parents, teachers and others professionals about living with autism, and has been interviewed by TV, radio and national newspapers.
