= Wally McArthur (footballer) =

English footballer

Personal information
- Full name: Walter J. McArthur
- Date of birth: 21 March 1912
- Place of birth: Denaby, England
- Date of death: 10 September 1980 (aged 68)
- Place of death: Bristol, England
- Height: 5 ft 10 in (1.78 m)
- Position: Wing half

Senior career*
Years	Team	Apps	(Gls)
1930–????	Denaby United		
????–1933	Goldthorpe United		
1933–1950	Bristol Rovers	261	(14)
- * Club domestic league appearances and goals

Walter J. McArthur (21 March 1912 – 10 September 1980) was a professional footballer who played in The Football League for Bristol Rovers as a wing half.

McArthur started his footballing career at his home town club Denaby United in 1930, and after a spell at Goldthorpe United he signed for Bristol Rovers in February 1933. He remained at Rovers for seventeen years, although this period was interrupted by the Second World War, and made 261 League appearances, scoring fourteen goals in the process.

On retiring from playing in 1950 McArthur became assistant trainer at Bristol Rovers, and he was appointed as their trainer in 1962. He lived in the Fishponds area of Bristol until his death in 1980.

His granddaughter Rachel Stowell (née McArthur) played for the England women's national football team.

== Sources ==
- Jay, Mike; Byrne, Stephen (1994). Pirates in Profile: A Who's Who of Bristol Rovers Players. Bristol: Potten, Baber & Murray. p. 157. ISBN 0-9524835-0-5.
