= WSL Hall of Fame =

Professional sports hall of fame

Women's Super League Hall of Fame
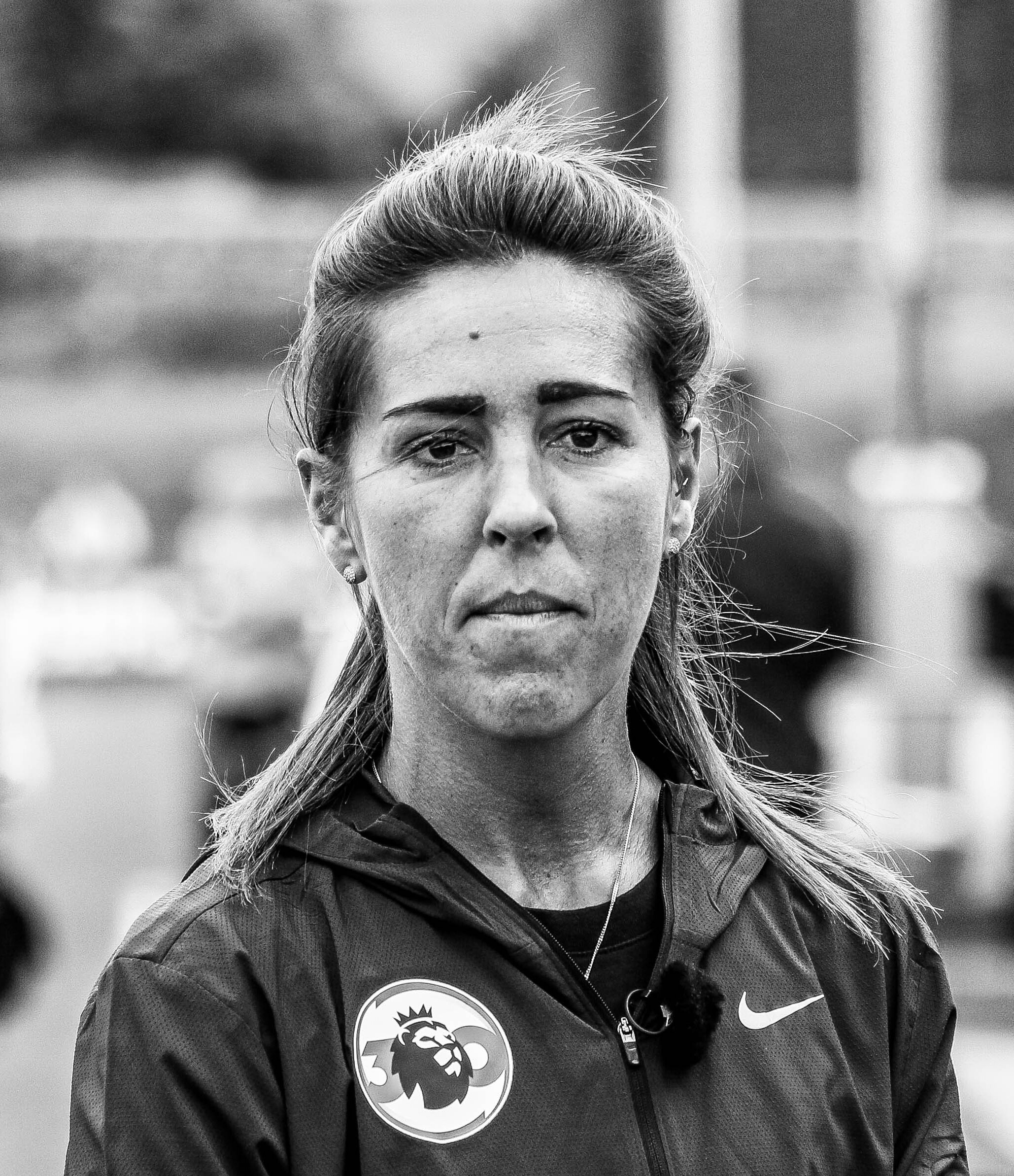
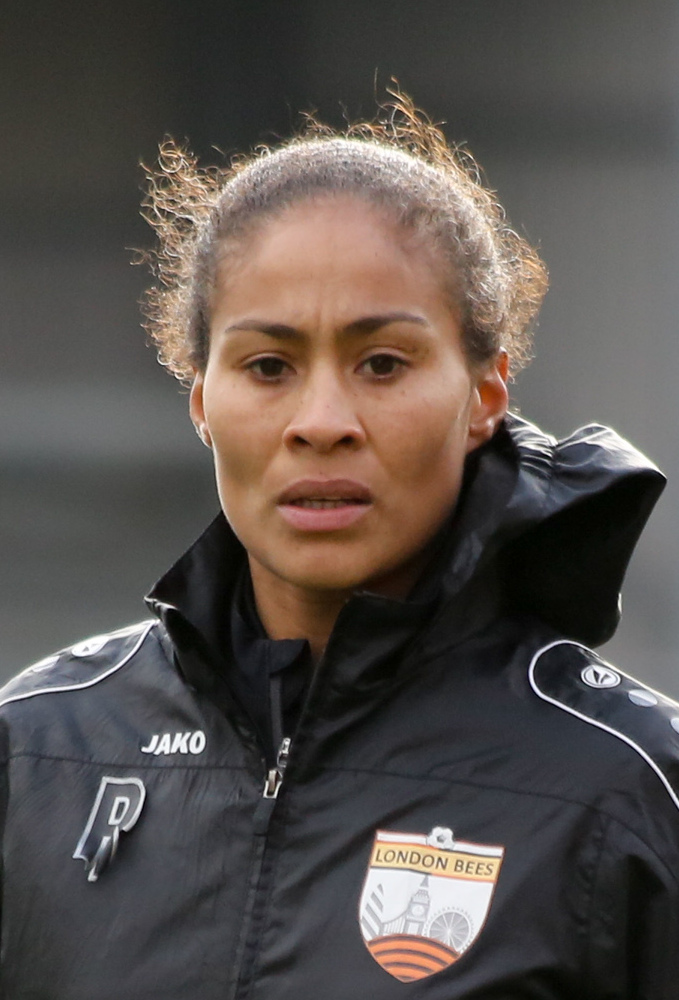
- Fara Williams and Rachel Yankey, the first players to be inducted
- Established: 2021
- Type: Professional sports hall of fame
- President: Kelly Simmons
- Website: Official website

The Women's Super League Hall of Fame (WSL Hall of Fame) honours the leading association football players and coaches that have played or managed in the Women's Super League (previously known as the FA WSL; FA Women's Super League), the top level of the English football league system. Inaugurated in 2021, the Hall of Fame, was launched to coincide with the 10th anniversary of the league following its inception in April 2011. It is intended to recognise and honour players and individuals that who have contributed to the growth of the women's game in England and the WSL since its founding.

In September 2021, as part of the inaugural class of 2021, three players were inducted; Fara Williams, Rachel Yankey, Kelly Smith and one manager, Emma Hayes. In subsequent years, a further three players were inducted, until 2024 when the first referee Rebecca Welch was included.

== Eligibility requirements ==
Those eligible for induction into the FA WSL Hall of Fame, include retired players, both active and retired coaches and active or retired match officials. The one thing they must all have "in common, is the positive impact and legacy" they have left on the league since the inception of the FA WSL in 2011. Their selection is only judged on their domestic performances in the FA WSL with no other competitions considered.

To assist the selection panel in selecting their inductee nominations, the following standards have been established:

- Players - Players must have participated in the Women's Super League (WSL) for at least three years and have made a major contribution to the league, whether as a champion, a team leader, or an exceptional individual player (or via her individual performances / individual accolades).
- Coaches - Coaches must have won a league championship or coached in the league for at least three years. The individual must have had a huge impact on the league, whether it was through winning the competition or nurturing new talent (youth development).
- Officials - Officials must have contributed significantly to the league during their tenure as officials and to have upheld a high standard of refereeing to support the Women's Super League's standards, integrity, and professionalism.

== Inductees ==
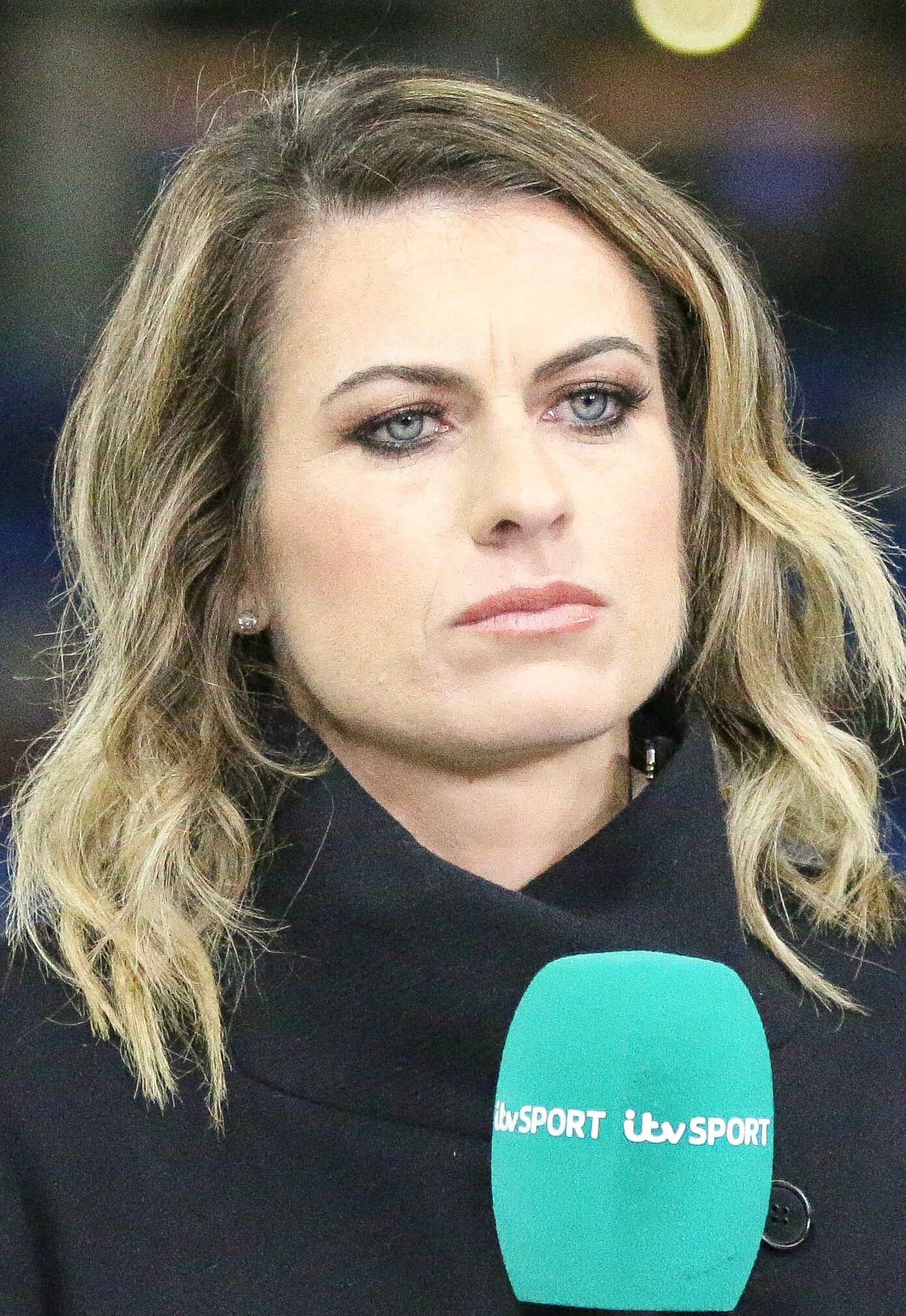
Karen Carney, inducted in 2022

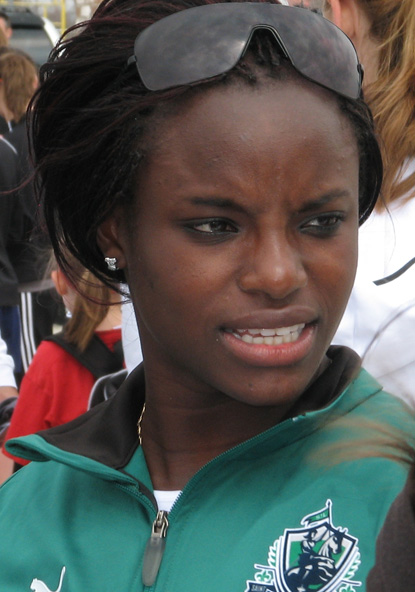
Eniola Aluko, inducted in 2022

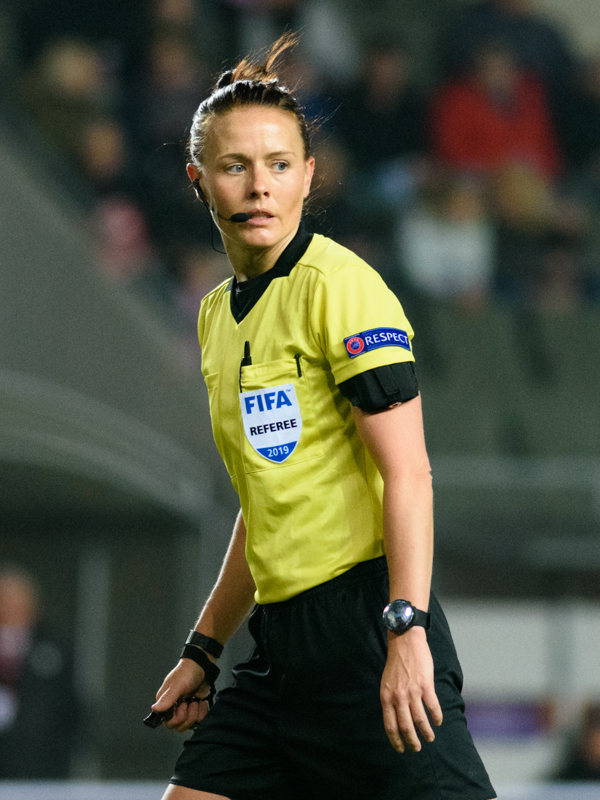
Rebecca Welch became the first official to be inducted.

Year	Player	Pos.	Years	Clubs	Achievements	Ref.
2021	(England) Fara Williams	MF	2011–2021	Everton; Liverpool; Arsenal	2× Champion	
2021	(England) Rachel Yankey	FW	2011–2017	Arsenal; Notts County Ladies	2× Champion	
2021	(England) Kelly Smith	MF	2012–2017	Arsenal		
2021	(England) Emma Hayes	Manager	2012–2024	Chelsea	7× Champion; 6× Manager of the Season	
2022	(England) Karen Carney	MF	2011–2019	Birmingham City; Chelsea	1× Golden Boot	
2022	(England) Katie Chapman	MF	2011–2018	Arsenal; Chelsea	4× Champion	
2022	(England) Eniola Aluko	FW	2012–2018	Birmingham City; Chelsea	3× Champion; 1× Golden Boot	
2023	(England) Jill Scott	MF	2011–2022	Everton; Manchester City; Aston Villa	1× Champion	
2023	(England) Ellen White	FW	2011–2022	Arsenal; Notts County Ladies; Birmingham City; Manchester City	2× Champion; 1× Golden Boot	
2023	(England) Anita Asante	DF	2018–2022	Chelsea; Aston Villa		
2024	(England) Alex Scott	DF	2012–2018	Arsenal	1× Champion	
2024	(England) Steph Houghton	DF	2011–2024	Arsenal; Manchester City	3× Champion	
2024	(England) Gilly Flaherty	DF	2011–2023	Arsenal; Chelsea; West Ham United; Liverpool	4× Champion	
2024	(England) Rebecca Welch	Referee	2011–2024	—N/a	—N/a	
2026	(England) Kerys Harrop	DF	2011–2023	Birmingham City; Tottenham Hotspur		
2026	(England) Casey Stoney	DF	2011–2018	Lincoln; Arsenal; Liverpool		
2026	(England) Matt Beard	Manager	2012–2015; 2018–2025	Liverpool; West Ham United; Bristol City	2× Champion; 2× Manager of the Season	

== Players by nationality ==
As of April 2026 award

Nationality	Players
England	14
