= Tom Mursell =

British careers advisor

Tom Mursell is a young entrepreneur, media spokesperson and speaker in the area of careers advice and jobs. He was a participant in the Channel 4 documentary Yeardot which followed 15 young people over the period of 12 months.

== Projects ==
Tom founded the school leaver website notgoingtouni.co.uk which is "dedicated to helping young people make informed decisions about their future by showing the opportunities that exist outside of university." The website has won awards including 'Best Young Persons Website' and the website has won Tom a place as one of the 'Future 100 Young Entrepreneurs'.

== Media ==
Mursell is frequently featured on TV, radio and print, commenting on topics such as youth unemployment, career advice and education. Tom was featured as a participant in the Channel 4 Yeardot television and web project by SO Television (founded by Graham Norton) which followed Mursell and fourteen other participants over the course of 12 months, logging their achievements and milestones.

Tom is often used to comment in the media, recent credits include a jobs panel for BBC Radio 1 alongside Online Dragons' Den 'dragon' Shaf Rasul, BBC Breakfast news, and The Times.
