= Lauren Walker =

English footballer

Personal information
- Date of birth: 12 March 1989 (age 37)
- Place of birth: Stoke-on-Trent, England
- Height: 5 ft 6 in (1.68 m)
- Positions: Defender; midfielder

Youth career
- Port Vale
- Stoke City

Senior career*
Years	Team	Apps	(Gls)
- Stoke City
- Wolverhampton Wanderers
2006–2009	Arsenal	0	(0)
2009–2010	Blackburn Rovers		
- Wolverhampton Wanderers
- * Club domestic league appearances and goals as of 14:31, 17 February 2019 (UTC)

Lauren Walker (born 12 March 1989) is an English footballer who usually plays at either left-back or left midfield. She previously represented Blackburn Rovers Ladies in the FA Women's Premier League National Division. She hails from Birches Head, Staffordshire.

== Club career ==
Walker played as a junior for Port Vale Girls and Stoke City Girls and as a senior for Wolverhampton Wanderers in the Northern Premiership before joining Arsenal' reserve side. She left Arsenal to join Blackburn Rovers in July 2009. Her first goal for Rovers came in their 4–2 Women's FA Cup first round win at home to Manchester City.

== International career ==
Walker was selected as a member of the Great Britain women's football squad for the World University Games in Belgrade in 2009. She played in each of the side's previous three games, but was an unused substitute as Britain lost on penalties to Japan in the semi-final. The side eventually won the Bronze Medal after beating France in the third-place play-off match.

== Personal life ==
Walker was a Sports and Exercise Science student at the University of Hertfordshire. Following her retirement, she became a biology teacher at Derby Grammar School.

== Statistics ==
To 28 October 2009

Club	Season	League		WFA Cup		Premier League Cup		County Cup		Other		Total	
Club	Season	Apps	Goals	Apps	Goals	Apps	Goals	Apps	Goals	Apps	Goals	Apps	Goals
Blackburn Rovers Ladies	2009–10	5	0	0	0	1	1	1	2	0	0	7	4
Club Total		5	0	0	0	1	1	1	2	0	0	7	4
