= 2006 FA Women's Community Shield =

Annual football match

2006 Women's FA Community Shield
Arsenal	Everton
3	0
- Venue: Gresty Road, Crewe
- Player of the Match: Anita Asante
- Referee: Saša Ihringová
- Attendance: 2,604

The 2006 Women's FA Community Shield was the seventh Women's FA Community Shield, as with its male equivalent, the Community Shield is an annual football match played between the winners of the previous season's league and the previous season's Women's FA Cup. The final was contested between Arsenal and Everton. Arsenal won 3–0.

== Match ==
=== Details ===
2 August 2006
20:05 BST

Arsenal	3–0	Everton
Smith 23'; Chapman 31'; Davison 90+3'	Report

Gresty Road, Crewe
Attendance: 2,604
Referee: Saša Ihringová

Arsenal	Everton

GK	1	(Republic of Ireland) Emma Byrne
DF	12	(England) Alex Scott
DF	3	(Republic of Ireland) Yvonne Tracy
DF	5	(England) Leanne Champ	(substituted off) 89'
DF	18	(England) Anita Asante
MF	4	(Wales) Jayne Ludlow
MF	8	(England) Kelly Smith
MF	17	(England) Katie Chapman	(substituted off) 67'
FW	9	(England) Lianne Sanderson
FW	11	(England) Rachel Yankey
FW	14	(England) Karen Carney	(substituted off) 82'
Substitutes:
GK	24	(Jamaica) Rebecca Spencer
DF	15	(England) Cori Daniels
MF	7	(Republic of Ireland) Ciara Grant	(substituted on) 67'
MF	16	(England) Sian Larkin	(substituted on) 89'
FW	20	(England) Gemma Davison	(substituted on) 82'
Manager:
(England) Vic Akers

GK	1	(England) Danielle Hill
DF	2	(England) Becky Easton	(yellow card) 44'
DF	5	(England) Fern Whelan
DF	6	(England) Lindsay Johnson
DF	3	(England) Rachel Unitt
MF	8	(England) Jill Scott		(substituted off) 83'
MF	4	(England) Leanne Duffy
MF	10	(England) Kelly McDougall		(substituted off) 56'
FW	7	(England) Amy Kane
FW	9	(England) Jody Handley
FW	11	(England) Michelle Evans		(substituted off) 67'
Substitutes:
GK		(England) Rachel Brown
DF		(England) Jayne Eadie
MF		(England) Fara Williams		(substituted on) 56'
MF		(England) Emily Westwood		(substituted on) 67'
FW		(England) Nicki Harding		(substituted on) 83'
Manager:
(England) Mo Marley
