= Gilly Flaherty =

English footballer (born 1991)

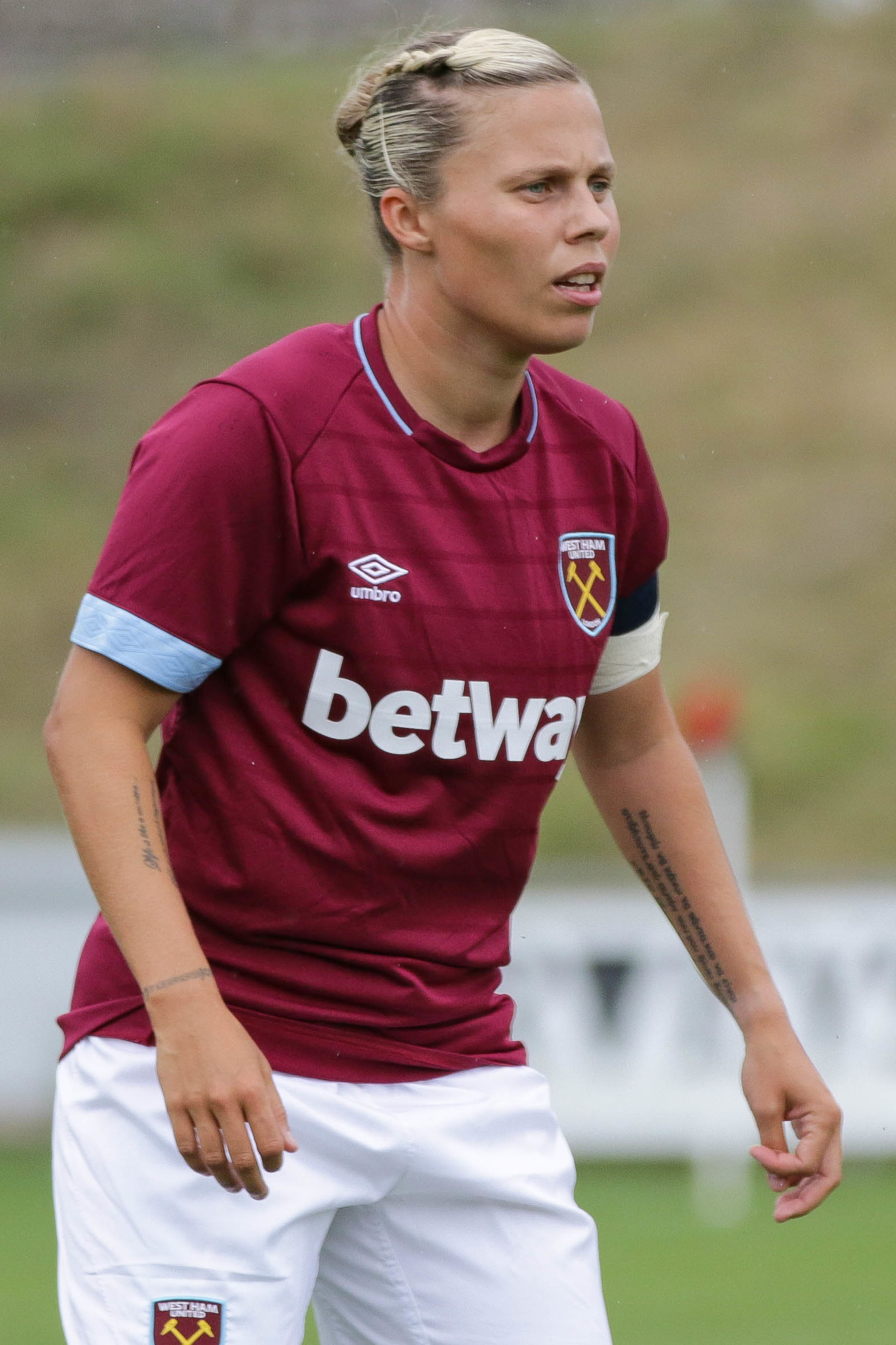
- Flaherty playing for West Ham United Women in 2018

Personal information
- Full name: Gilly Louise Scarlett Flaherty
- Date of birth: 24 August 1991 (age 35)
- Place of birth: London, England
- Height: 1.69 m (5 ft 7 in)
- Position: Centre-back

Youth career
- 2000–2003: Millwall Lionesses
- 2003–2006: Arsenal

Senior career*
| Years | Team | Apps | (Gls) |
| 2006–2013 | Arsenal | 76 | (4) |
| 2014–2018 | Chelsea | 57 | (8) |
| 2018–2022 | West Ham United | 63 | (1) |
| 2022–2023 | Liverpool | 8 | (0) |

International career^{‡}
| 2015–2017 | England | 9 | (0) |
- * Club domestic league appearances and goals as of 21:00, 21 January 2021 (UTC) ‡ National team caps and goals as of 18:33, 9 June 2017 (UTC+1)

Gilly Louise Scarlett Flaherty (born 24 August 1991) is an English former footballer and who played as a centre-back.

Flaherty began her career in the youth teams of Millwall Lionesses and Arsenal, and made her debut for the Arsenal Ladies senior team in 2006. She later played in the Women's Super League for Chelsea Women, West Ham United Ladies and Liverpool Women. Flaherty represented England at youth level before making her senior debut in October 2015.

Flaherty previously held the record for the most appearances in the Women's Super League, playing in her record-breaking 176th game in November 2022 to overtake previous holder Jill Scott. She announced her retirement from football halfway through the 2022–23 WSL season.

== Early life ==
Born in Rotherhithe / Bermondsey, Flaherty grew up in the London Borough of Southwark, located directly south of the River Thames. She was educated at Addey and Stanhope School, a secondary school located in New Cross, London, where she was a Head Girl.

In September 2007, Flaherty joined the Arsenal Ladies Academy, which combines academic studies with football coaching. The Academy is based at Oaklands Colleges Smallford Campus, St Albans, Hertfordshire. She gained a BTEC National Sport and Exercise Science qualification on successfully attaining a pass in the course.

== Club career ==
Flaherty started playing football with her father as a nine-year-old. She joined her first club, Millwall Lionesses, where she played for the youth teams until the age of thirteen.

=== Arsenal Ladies ===
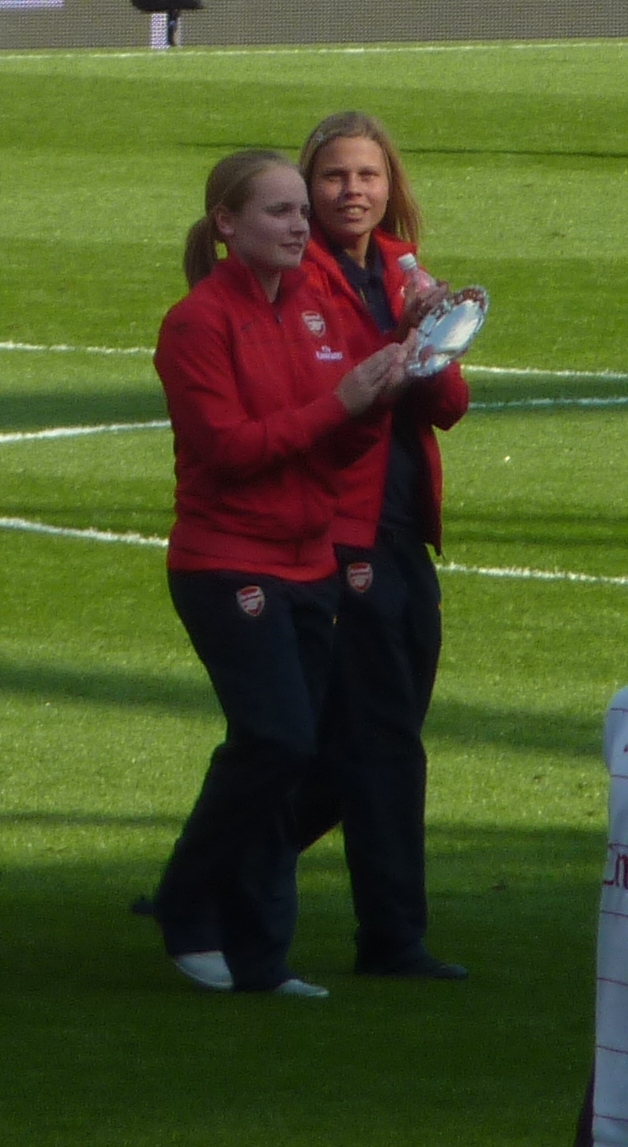
Flaherty (right) with Kim Little, May 2009

Flaherty joined Arsenal Ladies, following a successful trial with the club in 2003. She was part of its youth programme, playing for the Under-14s team. Flaherty worked her way through the club, coming off the bench to make her senior debut in October 2006 against Birmingham City, in a Premier League Cup match, when only 15 years old.

Flaherty was part of the Arsenal squad that won a quadruple in the 2006–07 season; comprising the UEFA Women's Cup, FA Women's National Premier League, FA Women's Cup and the FA Women's Premier League Cup. She was part of the Arsenal squad that made history by being the first team outside Germany or Scandinavia to win the UEFA Women's Cup. She was also in the team that won the 2006–07 season London County FA Women's Cup.

In April 2011, Flaherty scored the first ever goal in the FA WSL – the winner in an away match at Chelsea, in front of 2,510 supporters.

=== Chelsea Ladies ===
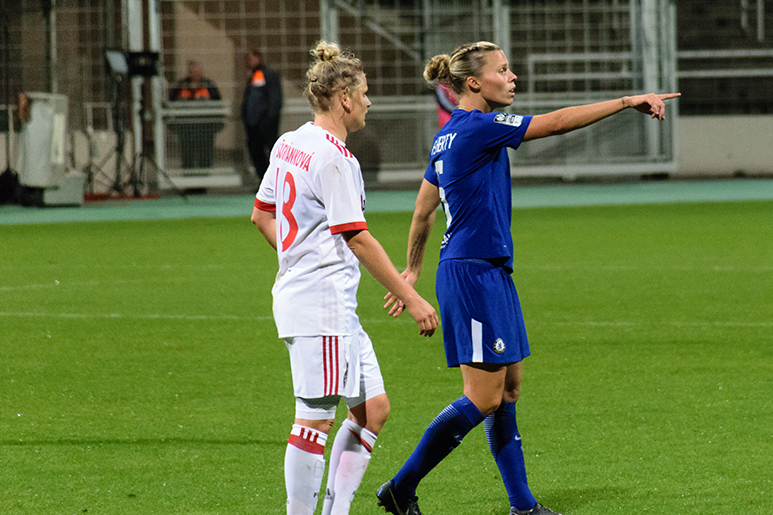
Flaherty (right) playing for Chelsea in 2017

In January 2014, Chelsea Ladies announced the double transfer of Flaherty and Katie Chapman from Arsenal. The move reunited both players with coach Emma Hayes, who previously worked at Arsenal. Hayes said of Flaherty: "Gilly is the best uncapped player in the country. She will become a bedrock for club and country as she has all the hallmarks of a top class player." Flaherty's first season with the team ended in disappointment, as they lost the league title to Liverpool on the final day of the campaign. 2015 proved much more successful, yielding the club's first ever major trophy – won at Wembley Stadium in the 2015 FA Women's Cup final. In October 2015, Chelsea's 4–0 win over Sunderland secured the FA WSL title and a League and Cup "double".

=== West Ham United Ladies ===
In June 2018, Flaherty joined West Ham United Ladies, who had successfully applied to join the FA WSL for the 2018–19 season. She followed former Chelsea teammates Rebecca Spencer and Claire Rafferty, both of whom had moved to the east London club during the close-season.

=== Liverpool Women ===
In July 2022, Flaherty signed for Liverpool Women. On 12 January 2023, Flaherty announced her retirement from football citing family reasons, following the death of her father in late 2022.

== International career ==
Flaherty is a former England under-19 and under-20 international. She has previously represented her country at under-15 and under-17 levels and made her debut for the under-23 team against Germany in September 2010.

Not favoured by England coach Hope Powell, in December 2013, Flaherty was named in the first senior squad to be named by Powell's successor Mark Sampson. She won her first senior cap in October 2015, starting England's 2–1 defeat by China in Yongchuan. In total, she made nine appearances for England.

Flaherty was given number 191 when the FA announced their legacy numbers scheme to honour the 50th anniversary of England’s inaugural international.

== Media appearances ==
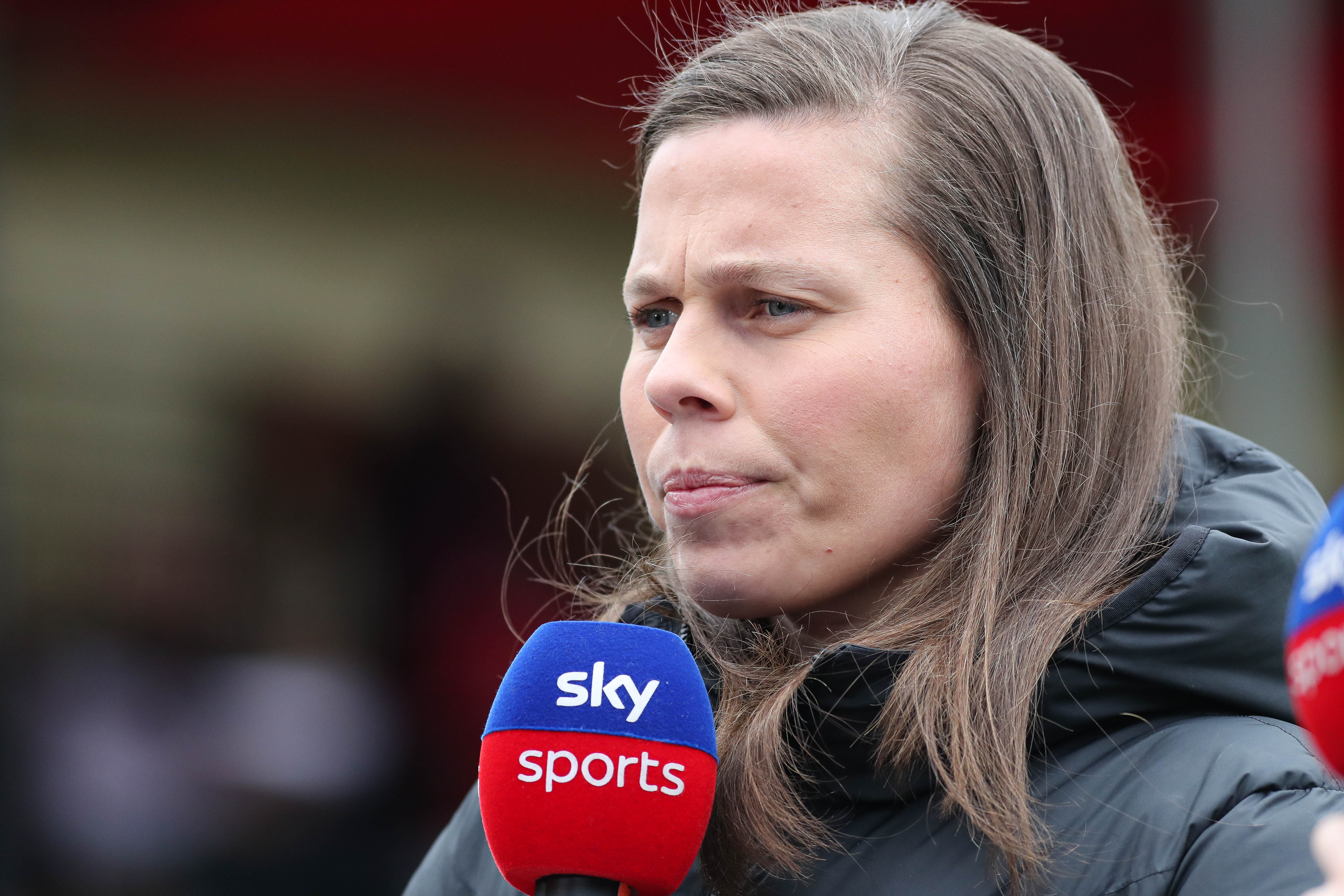
Flaherty covering a match for Sky Sports in 2023

In 2008 and 2009, Flaherty appeared on the Channel 4 television programme Yeardot. In 2023, Flaherty made numerous appearances as a football commentator including for the BBC and contributor to the football podcast Counter Pressed.

In 2023, Flaherty began appearing on the BBC's The Women's Football Show, and in 2025, was named their main co-commentator alongside former goalkeeper Rachel Brown-Finnis.

== Personal life ==
Flaherty was a P.E. teacher at John Donne primary school sporadically throughout her career.

In December 2018, Flaherty revealed that she is a lesbian and living with her partner Lily. In an interview in February 2020, Flaherty disclosed that she attempted suicide when she was 17 years old, due to mental health issues. She is a supporter of the Time to Talk day campaign, run by Time to Change.

Flaherty took part in a white-collar boxing match in August 2013, to raise money for Millwall's Girls' Centre of Excellence. She was stopped halfway through the second round.

== Honours ==
Arsenal

- UEFA Women's Cup: 2007
- FA Women's Cup: 2007, 2008, 2009, 2011, 2013
- FA WSL: 2011, 2012
- FA Women's National Premier League: 2007, 2008, 2009, 2010
- FA Women's Premier League Cup: 2007
- London County FA Women's Cup: 2007, 2008
- FA Women's Community Shield: 2006, 2008

Chelsea

- FA Women's Cup: 2015, 2018
- FA WSL: 2015, 2018
- FA WSL Spring Series: 2017

West Ham United

- FA Women's Cup: 2019; runners-up

Individual

- Women's Super League Hall of Fame: 2024
