= Félicienne Minnaar =

Dutch football player (born 1989)

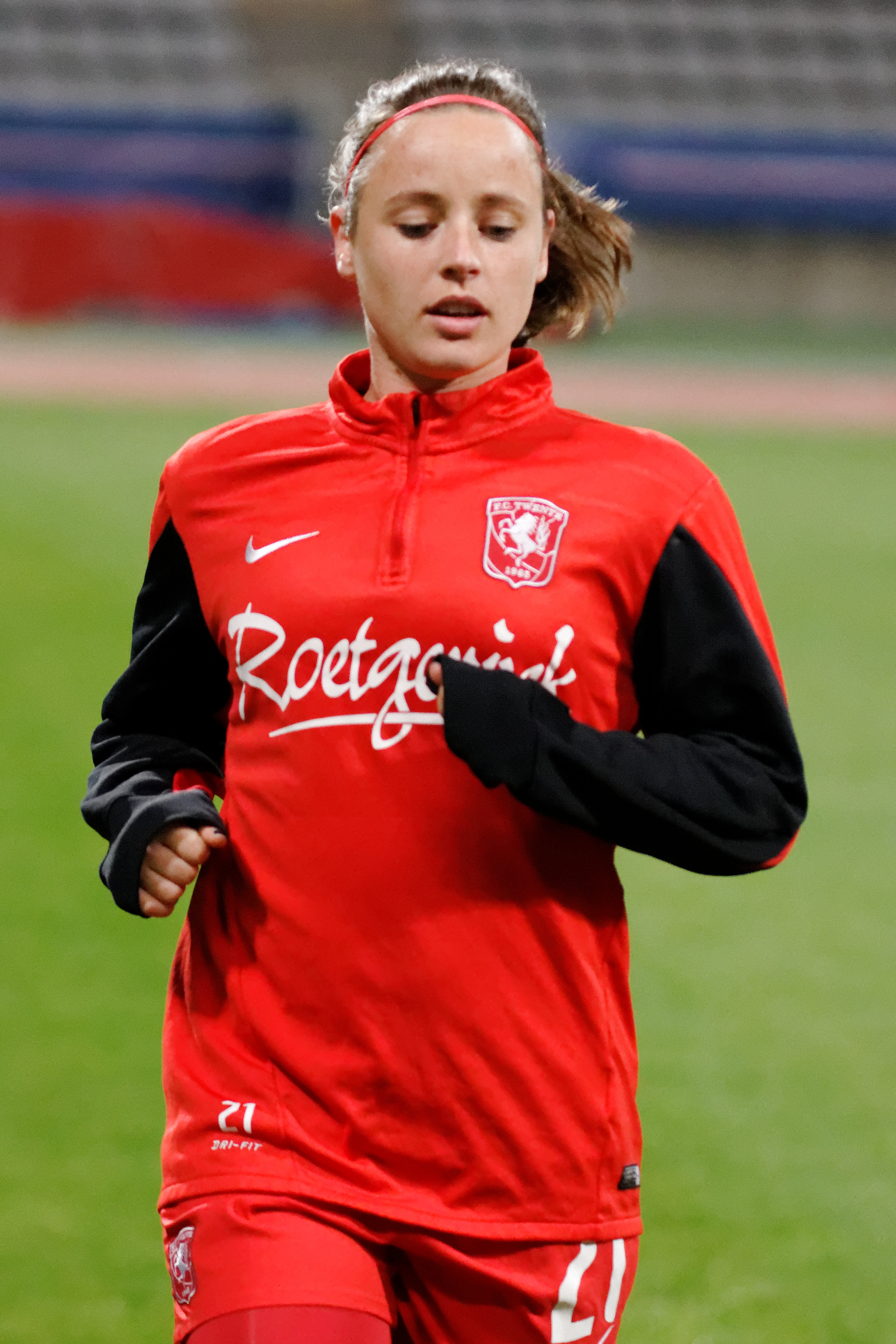

Personal information
- Date of birth: 31 January 1989 (age 37)
- Place of birth: The Hague, Netherlands
- Height: 1.71 m (5 ft 7 in)
- Position: Defender

Team information
- Current team: FC Twente

Félicienne Minnaar (born 31 January 1989) is a Dutch footballer who plays for FC Twente.
