= James C. Mursell =

British philatelist

The Reverend James Cuthbert Mursell (12 September 1860 – 28 February 1948) was a British philatelist, resident in Queensland since 1939, who was added to the Roll of Distinguished Philatelists in 1946.

Mursell was a specialist in the stamps of South Australia for which he won the Tilleard Medal in 1936. He was a regular contributor to the Australian Stamp Journal.
