= 2006–07 FA Women's Premier League Cup =

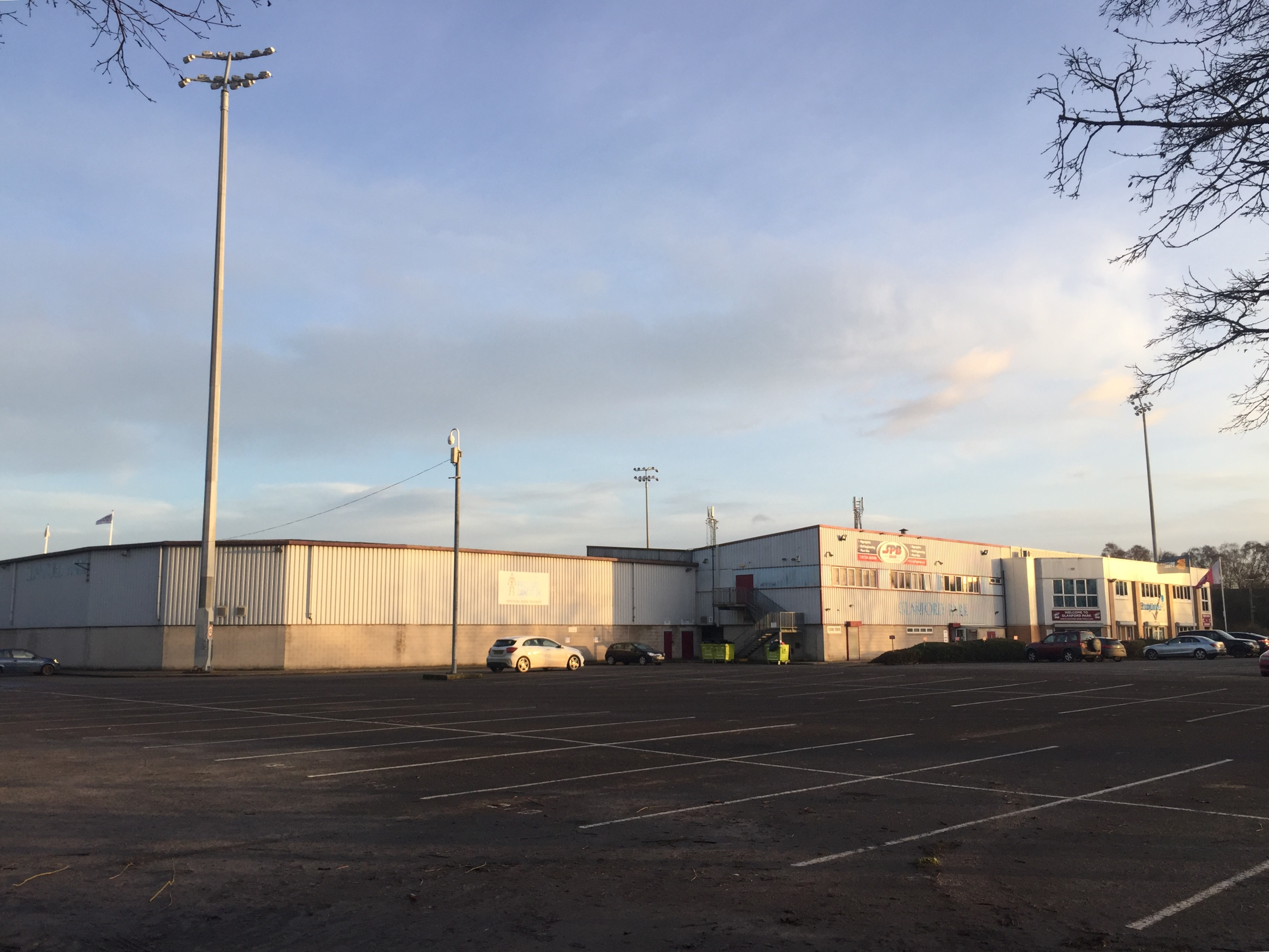
- Glanford Park hosted the final.

Tournament details
- Country: England
- Dates: 27 August 2006 – 25 March 2007
- Teams: 36

Final positions
- Champions: Arsenal
- Runners-up: Leeds United

Tournament statistics
- Matches played: 35
- Goals scored: 158 (4.51 per match)

The 2006–07 FA Women's Premier League Cup was the 16th staging of the FA Women's Premier League Cup, a knockout competition for England's top 36 women's football clubs.

The competition started on 27 August 2006, and concluded on 25 March 2007 with the final at Glanford Park, Scunthorpe, the first final to be held there.

The tournament was won by Arsenal, who beat Leeds United 1–0 in the final, with Jayne Ludlow scoring the winner in the second minute of stoppage time.

== Results ==
=== Preliminary round ===
Matches were played on 27 and 30 August

27 August 2006	Crystal Palace (S)	3–3 (4–2 p)	Portsmouth (S)
14:00	Dunmall; Poole	Report	Goal
	Penalties
	Penalty scored		Penalty scored Penalty missed

27 August 2006	Barnet (S)	3–2	Reading (S)
14:00	Curtis; D. Smith; Stevens	Report	Goal

27 August 2006	Aston Villa (NO)	1–4	Wolverhampton Wanderers (NO)
14:00	Packer	Report	Gutteridge; Roberts; H. Smith

30 August 2006	Curzon Ashton (NO)	3–1	Manchester City (NO)
14:00	Goal	Report	Goal

=== First round ===
Matches were played on 10 September.

10 September 2006	West Ham United (S)	2–0	Newcastle United (NO)
14:00	Barling; Pittuck	Report

10 September 2006	Southampton Saints (S)	1–3	Barnet (S)
14:00	Bell	Report	Curtis; Harvey

10 September 2006	Lincoln City (NO)	2–1	Sunderland (NO)
14:00	Michalska	Report	Hutchinson

10 September 2006	Millwall Lionesses (NO)	4–4 (a.e.t.) (4–1 p)	Fulham (NA)
14:00	C. Williams; Bennett	Report	McIntyre; Farmer; Gooden 87'
	Penalties
	Penalty scored		Penalty scored Penalty missed

10 September 2006	Leeds United (NA)	4–0	Cardiff City (NA)
14:00	Burke (pen.) (pen.); Wright; S. Smith	Report

10 September 2006	AFC Fylde (NO)	1–3 (a.e.t.)	Liverpool (NO)
14:00	Cafferkey	Report	Edwards; Hart

10 September 2006	Everton (NA)	4–0	Crystal Palace (S)
14:00	East 7' (o.g.); F. Williams; Westwood; Handley	Report

10 September 2006	Curzon Ashton (NO)	0–2	Nottingham Forest (NO)
14:00		Report	Creswell; Kennaugh

10 September 2006	Crewe Alexandra (NO)	5–3	Tranmere Rovers (NO)
14:00	Gurney; Penny; Price; Ragdale; Sloane	Report	L. Smith; Bagley; Rigby

10 September 2006	Chelsea (NA)	5–1	Watford (S)
14:00	Clarke; E. White; Edwards	Report	Hedgecock

10 September 2006	Bristol Academy (NA)	8–1	AFC Wimbledon (S)
14:00	Bartlett; Lorton; Greening; Cox	Report	Shorter

10 September 2006	Brighton & Hove Albion (S)	0–5	Charlton Athletic (NA)	Southwick
14:00		Report	Holtham 52'; Dowie 53'; Potter 71'; Aluko 78', 86'	Stadium: Old Barn Way

10 September 2006	Blackburn Rovers (NA)	6–0	Wolverhampton Wanderers (NO)
14:00	McCrea; Anderton; Twohig; Bailey	Report

10 September 2006	Birmingham City (NA)	2–1	Stockport County (NO)
14:00	Ballard; Hamilton	Report	Howden 59' (pen.)

10 September 2006	AFC Team Bath (S)	3–2	Keynsham Town (S)
14:00	Munro; Poole; Tinson	Report	Rocha; Suommen

8 October 2006	Arsenal (NA)	4–1	Doncaster Rovers Belles (NA)	Borehamwood
14:00	Fleeting 1', 5', 87'; Yankey 48'	Report	Exley 25' (pen.)	Stadium: Meadow Park

=== Second round ===
Matches were played on 8 October.

8 October 2006	Lincoln City (NO)	2–2 (a.e.t.) (5–4 p)	Liverpool (NO)
14:00	Moore	Report	Hart 41'; Parry
	Penalties
	Penalty scored		Penalty scored Penalty missed

8 October 2006	Nottingham Forest (NO)	0–1	West Ham United (S)
14:00		Report	Grafton 84'
Note: Records show Nottingham Forest progressed to the next round, despite West Ham United winning 1-0

8 October 2006	Leeds United (NA)	2–0	Barnet (S)
14:00	Burke 11' (pen.), 32'	Report

8 October 2006	Everton (NA)	2–0	Bristol Academy (S)
14:00	Handley 10', 65'	Report

8 October 2006	Crewe Alexandra (NO)	1–5	Charlton Athletic (NA)
14:00	Lambourne 20'	Report	Dowie 14'; Ritchie 26'; Roberts 44' (o.g.); Aluko 88', 89'

8 October 2006	Blackburn Rovers (NA)	3–6 (a.e.t.)	Chelsea (NA)
14:00	Anderton; Barr; (o.g.)	Report	Howell; Susi; Clarke; E. White

8 October 2006	AFC Team Bath (S)	1–1 (0–3 p)	Millwall Lionesses (S)
14:00	Campbell 65'	Report	Adie 30'
	Penalties
	Penalty missed		Penalty scored

15 October 2006	Arsenal (NA)	3–0	Birmingham City (NA)	Borehamwood
14:00	Davison 21'; Fleeting 50', 90'	Report		Stadium: Meadow Park

=== Quarter–finals ===
Matches were played on 5 and 19 November.

5 November 2006	Lincoln City (S)	0–6	Charlton Athletic (NA)	Collingham
14:00		Report	Dowie 37', 76', 79', 90'; Aluko 39', 66'	Stadium: Station Road

5 November 2006	Leeds United (NA)	2–1	Millwall Lionesses (S)
14:00	Burke; S. Smith	Report	Goal

5 November 2006	Everton (NA)	1–2	Chelsea (NA)
14:00	F. Williams	Report	E. White 13'; Clarke

19 November 2006	Arsenal (NA)	9–0	Nottingham Forest (NO)	Borehamwood
14:00	Sanderson 4'; Chapman 9', 59'; K. Smith 29'; Yankey; Larkin	Report		Stadium: Meadow Park

=== Semi–finals ===
Matches were played on 10 December.

10 December 2006	Charlton Athletic (NA)	2–2 (a.e.t.) (2–4 p)	Leeds United (NA)
14:00	Ritchie 45'; Dowie 56'	Report	Ward 12'; Emmanuel 75'
	Penalties
	Stoney (penalty scored); Aluko (penalty scored); Hills (penalty missed); Ritchie (penalty missed)		(penalty scored) Emmanuel

10 December 2006	Arsenal (NA)	4–1	Chelsea (NA)	Borehamwood
12:00	Fleeting 5', 13', 65'; Grant 60'	Report	E. White 75'	Stadium: Meadow Park

=== Final ===
25 March 2007
14:30

Leeds United	0–1	Arsenal
	Report	Ludlow 90+2'

Glanford Park, Scunthorpe
Attendance: 3,688
Referee: D Roberts
