= Heather Scheuber =

English footballer (born 1988)

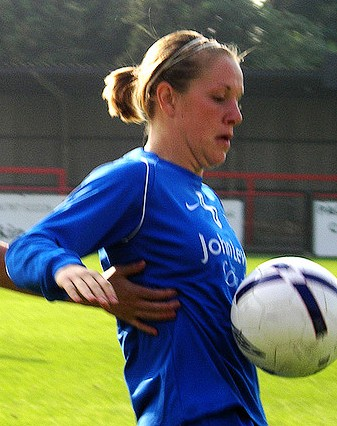

Personal information
- Date of birth: 20 January 1988 (age 38)
- Place of birth: Harlow, England
- Position: Midfielder

Youth career
- Tranmere Rovers

Senior career*
Years	Team	Apps	(Gls)
–2004	Tranmere Rovers		
2004–2011	Birmingham City		

International career^{‡}
- England U-17; England U-19
- * Club domestic league appearances and goals as of 5 May 2010 (UTC) ‡ National team caps and goals as of 5 May 2010 (UTC)

Heather Scheuber (born 20 January 1988) is an English footballer who played for Birmingham City Ladies Football Club in the FA WSL.

== Club career ==
In summer 2004 a 16-year-old Scheuber signed for Birmingham City from Tranmere Rovers. She was confirmed as a member of Birmingham City's FA WSL squad in December 2010.

== International career ==
Scheuber represented England at U-17 and U-19 level. In 2007, she fell into dispute with national team bosses after perceiving that her commitment had been questioned.

Scheuber was left out of the squad for the 2007 UEFA Women's Under-19 Championship in Iceland, and later indicated a willingness to switch her international allegiance to Wales.

== Coaching career ==
Since 2008, Scheuber has been the manager of Boughton Athletic FC, a local men's football team who play in Chester and District Division Three.

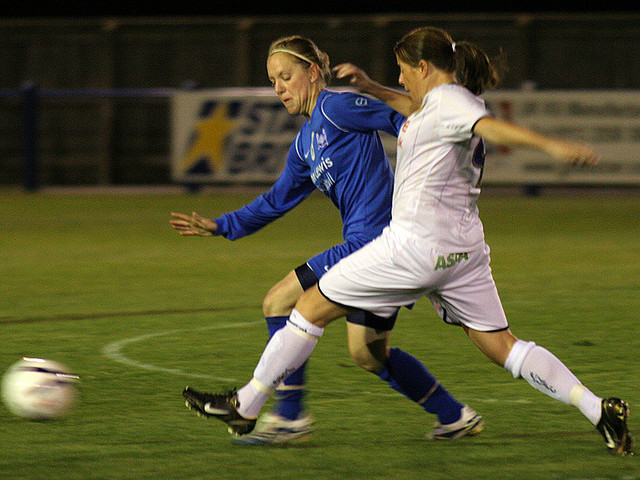
Scheuber (in blue) tackles Rachel Stowell of Leeds United
