= Katie Chapman =

English footballer (born 1982)

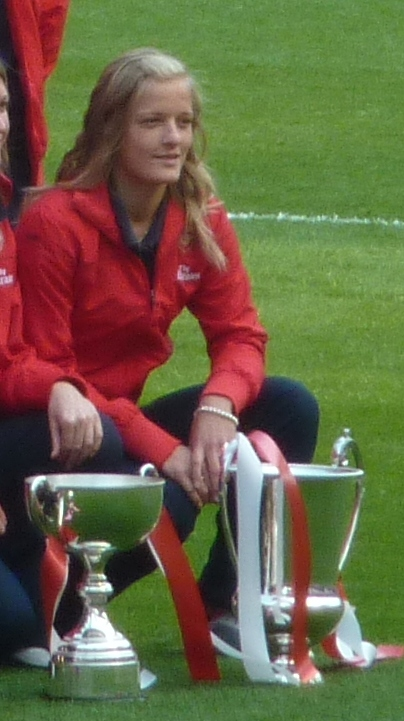
- Chapman with Arsenal in 2009

Personal information
- Full name: Katie Sarah Chapman
- Date of birth: 15 June 1982 (age 44)
- Place of birth: Bermondsey, London, England
- Height: 5 ft 7 in (1.71 m)
- Position: Midfielder

Youth career
- 1992–1996: Millwall Lionesses

Senior career*
Years	Team	Apps	(Gls)
1996–2000	Millwall Lionesses		
2000–2004	Fulham		
2004–2006	Charlton Athletic		
2006–2010	Arsenal	58	(30)
2010	Chicago Red Stars	21	(0)
2010–2013	Arsenal	37	(5)
2014–2018	Chelsea	61	(7)

International career
2000–2016	England	94	(8)
Medal record
Women's football
Representing England
FIFA Women's World Cup
Bronze medal – third place	2015 Canada
- * Club domestic league appearances and goals

Katie Sarah Chapman (born 15 June 1982) is an English former professional footballer. She primarily played as a central midfielder, although she was also deployed in central defence while playing for the England women's national team. Chapman was described as "a physical player who handles a brunt of the dirty work in the middle of the pitch." Her playing ability, profile and influence have drawn comparisons to former England captain David Beckham.

Chapman began her football career playing at primary school in her hometown of Bermondsey. At ten years old, she joined leading women's club Millwall Lionesses. In the 1996–97 season, Chapman made her senior team debut at the age of 14. She became a regular starter in the team and also participated in the 1997 FA Women's Premier League Cup and FA Women's Cup final wins. In the 1998–99 season, Chapman won FA Young Player of the Year award. Already a full England international, she left Millwall in 2000 to sign a professional contract with Fulham. She played on the teams that won back-to-back promotions, as well as the 2001–02 Premier League Cup and 2002 FA Women's Cup. In June 2001, Chapman was again named FA Young Player of the Year. After two years with Charlton Athletic from 2004, Chapman joined Arsenal and reached prominence with the team in her first season, winning a domestic treble as well as the UEFA Women's Cup. She had missed significant sections of the 2002–03 and 2007–08 seasons through pregnancy, and spent a single season in the United States with Women's Professional Soccer team Chicago Red Stars in 2010, before returning to Arsenal. After another pregnancy truncated her 2013 season, Chapman moved across London to sign for Chelsea in January 2014.

Chapman is a former England U–18 captain. She made her senior international debut aged 17 years in May 2000 in a 2001 UEFA Women's Championship qualification match against Switzerland. The following month, she made her first start against Norway. In March 2002, she netted her first senior international goal in a 4–1 2003 FIFA Women's World Cup qualification against the Netherlands. In her first spell with the national team, Chapman represented England at four major international tournaments; UEFA Euro 2001, UEFA Euro 2005, 2007 FIFA World Cup and UEFA Euro 2009. A two-time winner of the FA International Player of the Year in 2002 and 2010, Chapman took a break from the national team in March 2011 with a total of 82 caps and eight goals. She was recalled to the England squad in February 2014 by new manager Mark Sampson and helped them finish third at the 2015 FIFA World Cup.

== Club career ==
=== Millwall ===
Chapman joined Millwall Lionesses as a ten-year-old, and made her first team debut at 14 in the 1996–97 season. That season, she helped the Lionesses win an FA Women's Cup and Premier League Cup double. Lou Waller, who scored Millwall's winning goal in the FA Women's Cup final victory over Wembley, had been Chapman's coach in the club's youth teams. In the 1998–99 season, Chapman was named Young Player of the Year in the first ever FA Women's Football Awards.

=== Fulham ===
In June 2000, Chapman signed a contract with newly professional Fulham to become one of the first full-time professional female players in England. It was reported that Chapman was one of the most highly paid players in the team, on an annual salary of about £20,000. In her first season with the Cottagers, Chapman won the South West Combination Women's Football League, the third level of women's football, and was again named FA Young Player of the Year. She also played in Fulham's 1–0 FA Women's Cup final defeat to Arsenal.

In the 2001–02 season, Chapman helped Fulham win the FA Women's Premier League Southern Division and promotion to the top flight. She also scored two goals in the 7–1 Premier League Cup final win over Birmingham City, after which Fulham's manager Gaute Haugenes claimed Chapman was good enough to play in any national side in the world. Chapman then scored the winning goal in the 2–1 FA Women's Cup final victory over Doncaster Belles, a volley from 20 yards. In conclusion to the 2001–02 season, Chapman went on to be awarded the Ladies Player of the Season, as well as, winning the Nationwide International Player of the Year award.

Chapman sat out most of the following season due to pregnancy, as Fulham won a treble of FA Women's Premier League National Division, FA Women's Cup and Premier League Cup. She made the announcement during half-time of a match against Tranmere Rovers, and was promptly substituted by Haugenes – who quipped that he was not permitted to have 12 players on the pitch at once. When Chapman returned to action, in the FA Women's Community Shield in August 2003, Fulham were no longer a professional outfit. She represented Fulham in that season's UEFA Women's Cup campaign. In March 2004, Chapman played in Fulham's Premier League Cup final defeat to Charlton Athletic.

=== Charlton Athletic ===
July 2004 saw Chapman depart Fulham to sign for Charlton Athletic, making her debut in a 1–0 Community Shield win over Arsenal at Broadhall Way. She played in the Addicks' 3–0 defeat to Arsenal in the Premier League Cup final in March 2005. She then missed the conclusion of the 2004–05 season, including Charlton's FA Women's Cup win, with a broken hand sustained on international duty. In March 2006, Chapman played in her third successive Premier League Cup final, as Charlton beat Arsenal 2–1.

=== Arsenal ===
Chapman signed for league champions Arsenal in July 2006. She marked her Gunners debut with the opening goal in a 3–0 Community Shield win over Everton at Gresty Road. In Chapman's first season at the club, Arsenal claimed an unprecedented quadruple, winning the FA Premier League Cup, FA Women's Cup, FA Women's Premier League and the UEFA Women's Cup. Arsenal's assistant coach Emma Hayes described Chapman as "a rock that makes everything around her better. She was the engine and heartbeat of the successful quadruple-winning team." Midway through the 2007–08 season, Chapman's second pregnancy ruled her out of the rest of the campaign.

During the 2008–09 season, Chapman returned to help Arsenal retain the league title; she also scored the opening goal in the 2009 FA Women's Cup final at Pride Park against Sunderland, in a game which ended 2–1 to Arsenal. She had also featured in Arsenal's 5–0 Premier League Cup final win over Doncaster Rovers Belles.

=== Chicago Red Stars ===
In December 2009, WPS club Chicago Red Stars signed Chapman, who cited the need for a new challenge. The Red Stars announced that Chapman would join the club in time for the 2010 WPS season, joining up with former Arsenal coach Emma Hayes and England team-mate Karen Carney. After making 21 appearances during the campaign, Chapman negotiated a mutual release from her contract and returned to Arsenal. It was reported that Chapman's husband had difficulty finding employment in the United States, so she returned home for the sake of her family.

=== Back to Arsenal ===
Chapman rejoined Arsenal in October 2010, with the club on domestic hiatus before the launch of the FA WSL. She was praised by manager Laura Harvey after scoring late, decisive goals against Rayo Vallecano Femenino and Linköpings FC which helped to take Arsenal through to a UEFA Women's Champions League semi-final against eventual winners Lyon. In May 2011, following injuries to Faye White and Jayne Ludlow, Chapman captained the Arsenal team which beat Bristol Academy 2–0 at the Ricoh Arena to reclaim the FA Women's Cup.

Arsenal and Chapman won the first two editions of the FA WSL in 2011 and 2012. In March 2013, Arsenal announced that Chapman was seven months pregnant and would miss the first half of the 2013 campaign. She returned to the team in a friendly win over Coventry City in July 2013, following the birth of her third child.

On 3 August 2013, Chapman made a substitute appearance in Arsenal's 3–0 FA WSL win over Liverpool. The FA decreed she had not been properly registered and Arsenal were deducted three points. The blunder meant that Arsenal – champions for the last nine consecutive seasons – could not finish higher than third and would not qualify for the 2014–15 UEFA Women's Champions League, unless they won the 2013–14 competition.

=== Chelsea ===
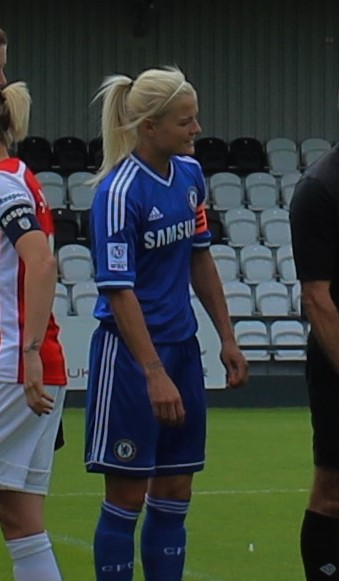
Chapman captaining Chelsea in July 2014

In January 2014, Chelsea announced the double transfer of Chapman and Gilly Flaherty from Arsenal. The move reunited Chapman with Emma Hayes, her coach from Arsenal and Chicago. She hoped that training more regularly with Chelsea would kick start her international career. In August 2015, Chapman captained Chelsea in their FA Women's Cup final against Notts County, the first time the event had been staged at Wembley Stadium. She described the experience as "overwhelming". Chelsea's 1–0 win before a Cup final record 30,710 crowd secured the club's first major trophy. It was the ninth FA Women's Cup winner's medal of Chapman's career. In October 2015 she played in Chelsea's 4–0 win over Sunderland which secured the club's first FA WSL title and a League and Cup "double".

At the 2018 FA Women's Cup final, Chapman secured a record 10th winner's medal as Chelsea beat Arsenal 3–1 at Wembley. Five days later, she announced that she was retiring from football at the end of the 2017–18 season.

== International career ==
As a 16-year-old, Chapman was called into the England U–18 team, and captained her country at that level. Chapman made her senior debut for England at 17, during the 2001 UEFA Women's Championship qualification tournament, replacing Samantha Britton after 73 minutes of a 1–0 win over Switzerland in Bristol on 13 May 2000. Chapman's first senior start came in an 8–0 reverse to Norway in June 2000. Despite the heavy defeat she was praised for her performance by national coach Hope Powell. England qualified for the final tournament with Chapman named Player of the Match in the away leg of the play-off win over Ukraine.

At UEFA Women's Euro 2001, Chapman played in all three of England's games and was praised for her performances by UEFA and the victorious German coach Tina Theune-Meyer.

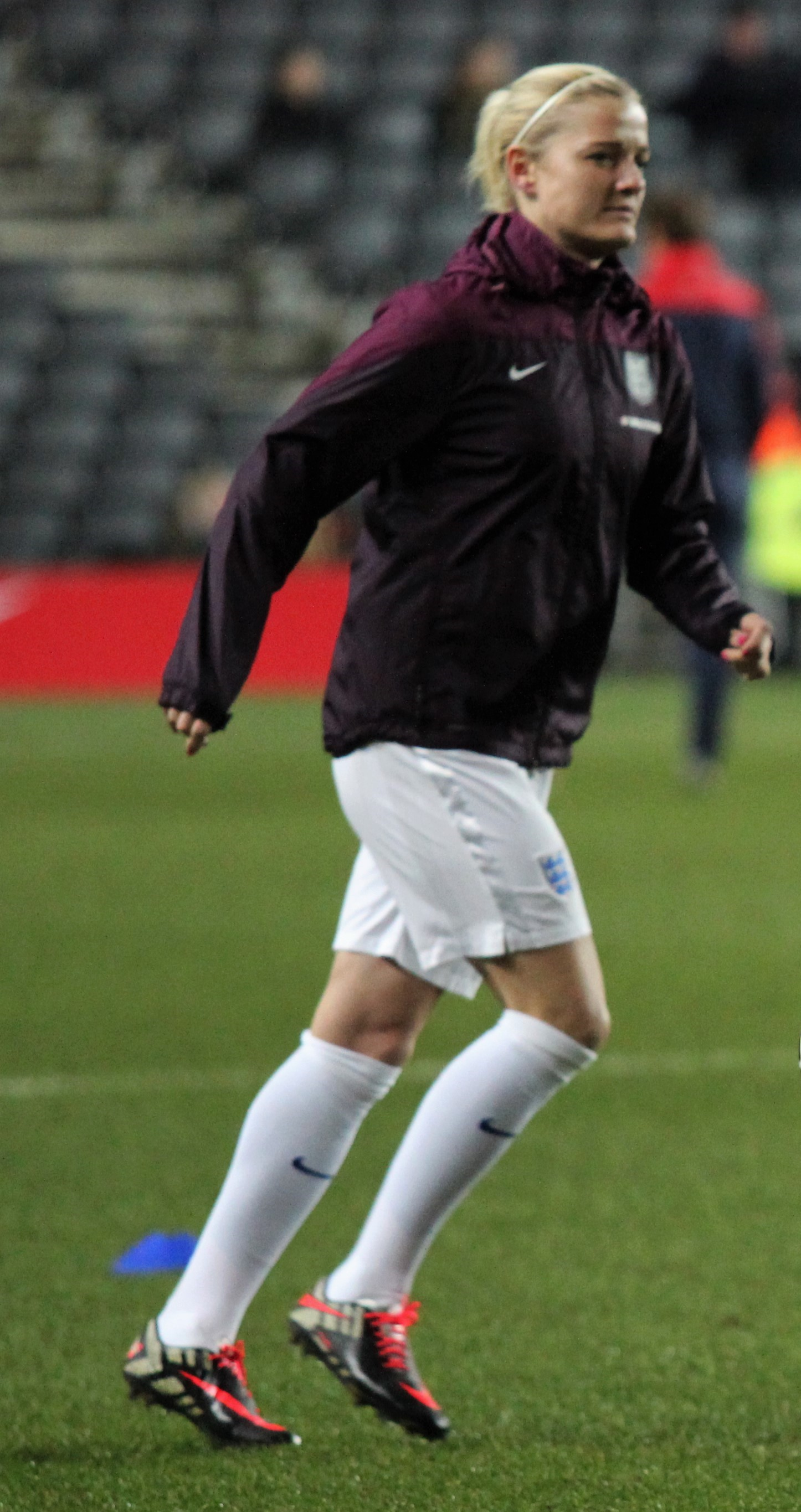
Chapham training with England in 2015

In March 2002, Chapman headed her first goal for England in a 4–1 2003 FIFA Women's World Cup qualification win in the Netherlands. She was named FA International Player of the Year for 2002. Without Chapman – pregnant with her first child – England eventually failed to reach the 2003 FIFA Women's World Cup after a play-off defeat to France.

Despite a hand injury, Chapman also played every minute of all three games for England at UEFA Women's Euro 2005, now featuring in midfield as she did at club level. Her initial appearances for the national team had come in central defence. At the 2007 FIFA Women's World Cup, Chapman started three matches, missing the group game against Argentina after picking up her second booking of the tournament during an impressive performance against Germany.

On Chapman's return to the team she scored two goals in a Cyprus Cup win over South Africa in March 2009. It was her first appearance for England since October 2007, due to the birth of her second child. In May 2009, Chapman was one of the first 17 female players to be given central contracts by The Football Association. She was an ever-present in midfield during England's run to the final of UEFA Women's Euro 2009. In 2010, Chapman was named FA International Player of the Year for the second time.

Ahead of a March 2011 friendly against the United States, Chapman unexpectedly withdrew from the England squad and quit international football. The decision, related to Chapman's family commitments, was reported to have left England's World Cup preparations in disarray. Powell praised Chapman as "a wonderful servant to England over the years". Chapman later confirmed she had been unhappy about a perceived lack of support with childcare costs and arrangements while on international duty. At the 2011 World Cup, Powell stressed that the FA had tried hard to accommodate Chapman's requirements: "Katie was away with us in 2009 when we paid for her family to come along but at the end of the day there is not a bottomless pit of money in the women's game."

In September 2013, after Powell had been sacked, Chapman gave an interview to BBC Radio 5 Live in which she lamented her treatment. Chapman recalled that she asked for time off to look after her children in a brief conversation with Powell, only to receive an e-mail cancelling her central contract three hours later. She clarified that she had never retired from international football and that she still wanted to return and win 100 caps.

Powell's successor Mark Sampson eventually recalled Chapman to the national team squad in February 2015, for a friendly against the United States in Milton Keynes. In May 2015, Sampson confirmed Chapman in his final squad for the 2015 FIFA Women's World Cup, to be hosted in Canada. During the tournament, Chapman celebrated her 33rd birthday and her husband and children flew out for a surprise visit. Despite her selection she made further public criticisms of the FA's ongoing lack of childcare arrangements. England eventually finished in third place after Chapman, starting her fifth match of the tournament, helped them beat Germany 1–0 in the bronze medal play-off.

Chapman's final appearance for England came in April 2016. In September 2017, she accused Sampson of leaving her out of the national team because she was getting divorced.

She was allotted 132 when the FA announced their legacy numbers scheme to honour the 50th anniversary of England's inaugural international.

=== Great Britain Olympic ===
In June 2012, Chapman was not included in the final 18-player Great Britain squad for the 2012 London Olympics. She had made the 35-player longlist but was hurt and disappointed to be overlooked for the event in her home city. Chapman felt that her decision to withdraw from the England squad had caused Hope Powell – who managed Great Britain as well as England – to leave her out.

== Personal life ==
Chapman has three children with former husband Mark Wilkinson, a construction worker she met while he coached at Millwall Lionesses. In the 2002–03 season, Chapman sat out Fulham's treble winning season while pregnant with her first child, but returned in August 2003 and played in the FA Women's Community Shield win over Doncaster Belles.

In January 2008, Chapman announced she was pregnant with her second child, and as a result played no further part in Arsenal's 2007–08 season. Chapman returned to Arsenal for the 2008–09 season and assisted in their 5–1 victory over Nottingham Forest, in Carlton, on 18 September. She divorced Wilkinson in 2016.

Chapman is a lifelong supporter of Millwall, and has trained as a beautician. She has a twin, Sophie, who she played alongside at Millwall Lionesses.

== Career statistics ==
Scores and results list England's goal tally first.

#	Date	Venue	Opponent	Score	Result	Competition
1.	23 March 2002	Zuiderpark Stadion, The Hague, Netherlands	Netherlands	1–0	4–1	2003 World Cup qualifier
2.	27 October 2005	Tapolca Stadium, Tapolca, Hungary	Hungary	5–0	13–0	2007 World Cup qualifier
3.	13 May 2007	Priestfield Stadium, Gillingham, England	Northern Ireland	3–0	4–0	Euro 2009 qualifier
4.	17 May 2007	Roots Hall, Southend-on-Sea, England	Iceland	2–0	4–0	Friendly
5.	17 May 2007	Roots Hall, Southend-on-Sea, England	Iceland	4–0	4–0	Friendly
6.	5 March 2009	GSZ Stadium, Larnaca, Cyprus	South Africa	5–0	6–0	2009 Cyprus Cup
7.	5 March 2009	GSZ Stadium, Larnaca, Cyprus	South Africa	6–0	6–0	2009 Cyprus Cup
8.	1 April 2010	New Den, London, England	Spain	1–0	1–0	2011 World Cup qualifier

== Honours ==
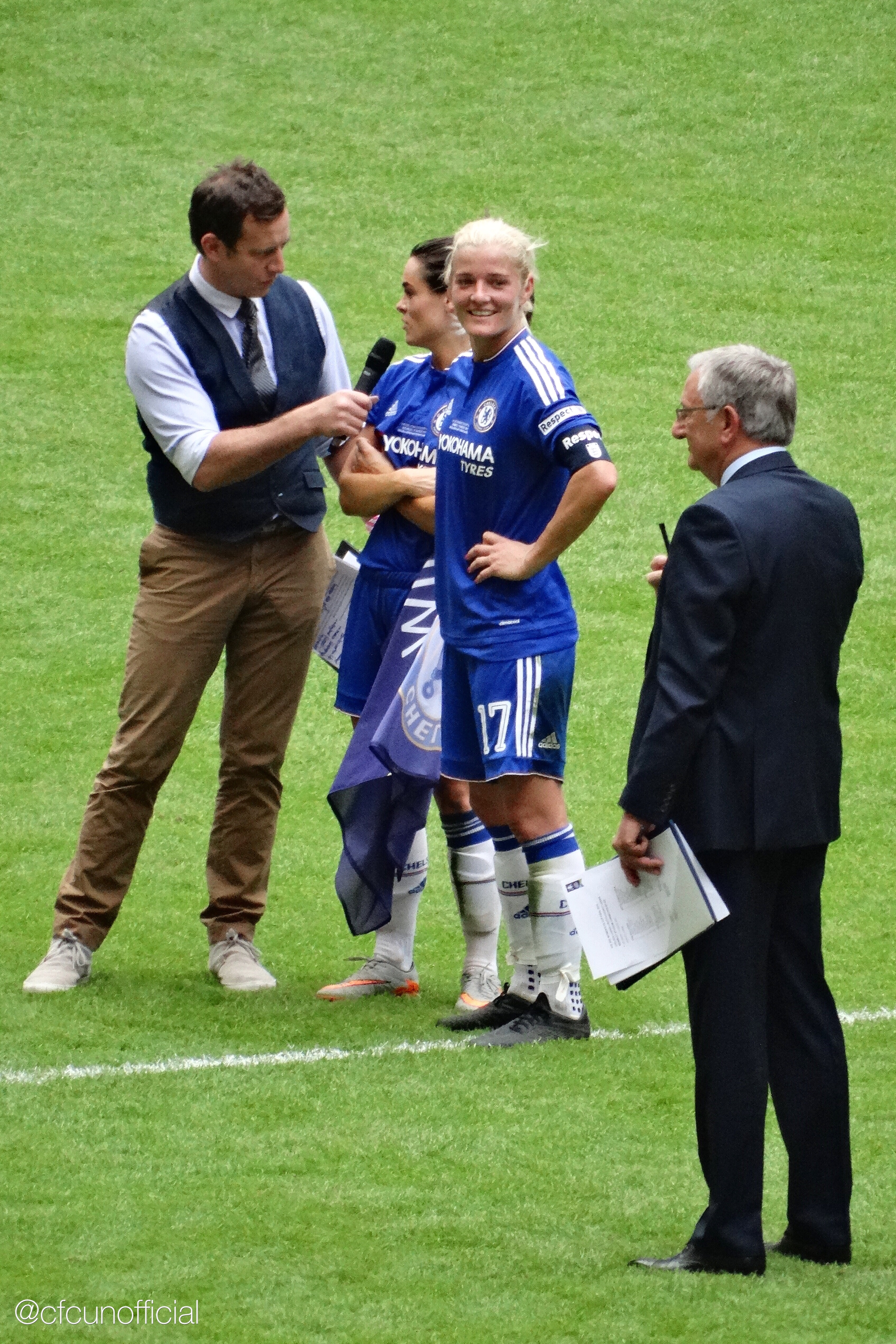
Chapman waiting to be interviewed on the pitch at Wembley Stadium, August 2015

Millwall Lionesses

- FA Women's Cup: 1996–97
- FA Women's Premier League Cup: 1996–97

Fulham

- FA Women's Premier League National Division: 2002–03
- FA Women's Premier League Southern Division: 2001–02
- South East Combination Women's Football League: 2000–01
- FA Women's Cup: 2001–02, 2002–03
- FA Women's Premier League Cup: 2001–02, 2002–03

Charlton Athletic

- FA Women's Cup: 2004–05
- FA Women's Premier League Cup: 2005–06

Arsenal

- FA WSL: 2011, 2012
- FA Women's Premier League National Division: 2006–07, 2007–08, 2008–09
- UEFA Women's Cup: 2006–07
- FA Women's Cup: 2006–07, 2007–08, 2008–09, 2010–11
- FA Women's Premier League Cup: 2006–07, 2008–09
- FA WSL Cup: 2011
- FA Women's Community Shield: 2006

Chelsea

- FA WSL: 2015
- FA Women's Cup: 2014–15, 2017–18

England

- Cyprus Women's Cup: 2009, 2015
- UEFA Women's Championship runner-up: 2009
- FIFA Women's World Cup third place: 2015

Individual

- FA Women's Young Player of the Year: 1998–99, 2000–01
- FA Women's International Player of the Year: 2001–02, 2009–10
- Women's Super League Hall of Fame: 2022
