= Rachel Stowell =

English footballer

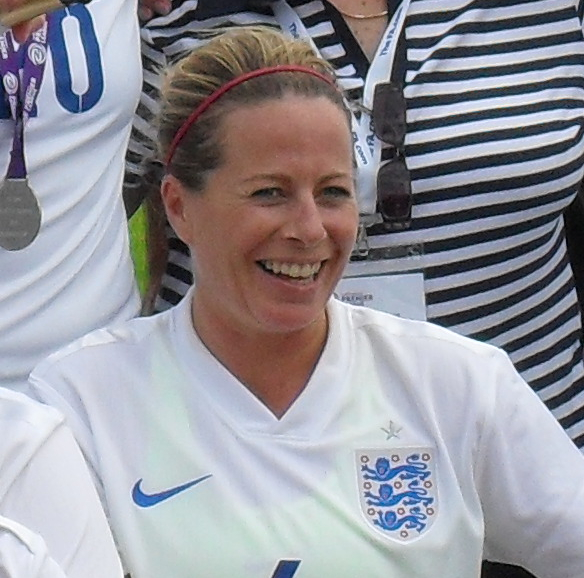
- Stowell in 2015

Personal information
- Date of birth: 27 July 1977 (age 49)
- Place of birth: Bristol, England
- Position: Midfielder

Youth career
- Bristol City

Senior career*
Years	Team	Apps	(Gls)
1989–1996	Bristol City		
1996–2000	Southampton Saints		
2000–2004	Fulham		
2004–2005	Bristol City		
2005–2006	Arsenal		
2006–2008	Leeds United		
2009–2010	Leicester City		

International career^{‡}
2002–2005	England	14	(1)
- * Club domestic league appearances and goals as of 14:08, 31 December 2010 (UTC) ‡ National team caps and goals as of 14:08, 27 January 2025 (UTC)

Rachel "Macca" Stowell (née McArthur; born 27 July 1977) is a former English football player, who played as a central midfielder. She finished her career with Leicester City Women after season 2009–10, and is a former member of the England squad.

== Club career ==
Stowell joined her local club Bristol City aged 12 and played there for seven years before moving to Southampton Saints. With Southampton, Stowell played in the 1999 FA Women's Cup final. She joined Fulham when the club went professional in 2000 and played for the club from 2000 until 2003.

In 2004, Stowell returned to newly promoted Bristol City. She then went on to play for Arsenal and Leeds United. Stowell joined Leicester City after a period of inactivity after childbirth and an ACL injury. She captained Leicester to third place in the 2009–10 FA Women's Premier League Northern Division, then retired at the end of the season.

== International career ==
Stowell has England legacy number 141. The FA announced their legacy numbers scheme to honour the 50th anniversary of England’s inaugural international.

=== International goals ===
Scores and results list England's goal tally first, score column indicates score after each Stowell goal

#	Date	Venue	Opponent	Score	Result	Competition	Ref.
1	9 March 2005	Paderne, Portugal	Northern Ireland	3–0	4–0	Algarve Cup	

== Personal life ==
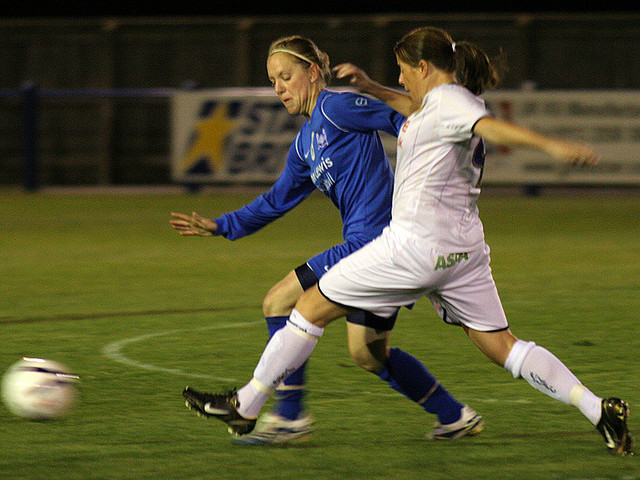
Stowell (right) tackles Heather Scheuber of Birmingham City

Stowell's grandfather Wally McArthur played for Bristol Rovers from 1933 until 1950.

She married former Wolves goalkeeper Mike Stowell in June 2009, following the birth of their daughter in April of the previous year. The two married whilst Rachel was playing for Leicester City Women and Mike was the goalkeeping coach at Leicester City FC. The couple's daughter Ella is a goalkeeper who plays for Plymouth Argyle and has been called up for England at youth level.
