= Jayne Ludlow =

Welsh footballer and coach

Jayne Ludlow MBE
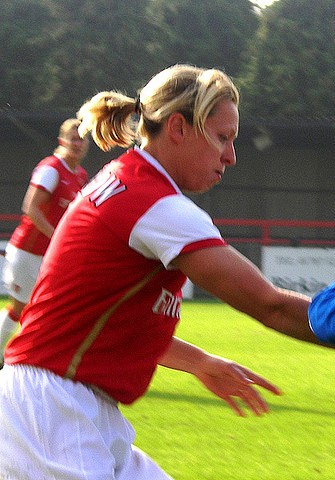
- Ludlow in October 2006

Personal information
- Full name: Jayne Louise Ludlow
- Date of birth: 7 January 1979 (age 47)
- Place of birth: Llwynypia, Wales
- Height: 1.73 m (5 ft 8 in)
- Position: Midfielder

Senior career*
Years	Team	Apps	(Gls)
- Barry Town Ladies
- Millwall Lionesses
- Southampton Saints
2000–2013	Arsenal Ladies	356	(211)
2005	→ New York Magic (loan)	6	(3)

International career
1996–2012	Wales	61	(19)

Managerial career
- 2013–2014: Reading
- 2014–2021: Wales
- * Club domestic league appearances and goals

Jayne Louise Ludlow MBE (born 7 January 1979) is a Welsh football coach and former player. A midfielder, Ludlow played at Arsenal for 13 years, whom she also captained and was the club's all-time top goalscorer when she retired. She represented the Wales national team from 1996 to 2012, and had been captain until her international retirement.

Ludlow later moved into management and led the Wales national team and its youth teams.

== Early life ==
Ludlow's father had been a professional football player, and she began her own football career early, playing with a boys' team before having to stop aged 12. Ludlow enjoyed a promising junior career in athletics, being the British record holder in the triple jump at Under-17 level and also representing the UK at the Under-20s level. She also represented Wales at netball and basketball. Ludlow decided to focus on football, but had to travel to Barry Town to play since there were no girls' teams in the South Wales Valleys.

== Club career ==
Ludlow won a scholarship to the University of Pennsylvania, but left months into the four-year course due to dissatisfaction with the standard of football. She then moved to London and played for Millwall Lionesses and Southampton Saints, while completing a physiotherapy degree at King's College, London.

Joining Arsenal in 2000, Ludlow scored 28 goals from midfield as she helped the Gunners to a domestic treble in her first season. At the time, manager Vic Akers described her as "the best box-to-box player in the women's game". She was voted Players' Player of the Year in 2001, an achievement she repeated in 2003 and 2004. In 2007, Ludlow was a key part of the side which won an unprecedented quadruple, scoring 24 goals, including a volley from 30 yards in Arsenal's 4–1 win over Charlton Athletic in the 2007 FA Cup final. In the 2005 off-season, she returned to the United States to play for New York Magic.

She stayed loyal to Arsenal to become vice-captain and later, captain of the side.

During Arsenal's 1–0 league win at Everton in April 2010, Ludlow was red carded for an "aggressive outburst" at opponent Fara Williams. This meant that club captain Ludlow was suspended for the 2010 FA Women's Cup final, in which Arsenal were beaten by Everton.

In July 2013, after a succession of injuries, Ludlow announced her retirement from playing, indicating a desire to focus on her role as an academy coach with Arsenal and Wales. Altogether with Arsenal, Ludlow won nine league titles, six FA Cups, and a UEFA Women's Cup. Ludlow is Arsenal's all-time highest goal scorer.

== International career ==
Ludlow won her first senior Wales cap at the age of 17, against the Republic of Ireland in February 1996.

In November 2010, she returned to the fold following the appointment of new coach Jarmo Matikainen. Ludlow then won her 50th cap, and scored her 18th goal, in captaining Wales to an 8–1 win over Bulgaria.

When Ludlow retired from international football in October 2012, she was described by Matikainen as "the most successful player that Wales has ever had".

== Coaching career ==
In August 2013, Ludlow accepted a position as manager and director of Reading, who had successfully bid for a place in the FA WSL 2. She stepped down from the role at the end of the 2014 FA WSL season, after being appointed manager of the Wales women's national football team on 2 October 2014. Ludlow was the technical director of Manchester City Girls' Academy from April 2021 to January 2024.

== Playing style ==
At first, Ludlow sought to mimic Pelé's playing style. She went on to model her game upon players such as Roy Keane to become a more orthodox midfielder. Ludlow has also often been compared with fellow Gunner Freddie Ljungberg, to her delight.

== Personal life ==
Ludlow is a supporter of Arsenal. She was appointed Member of the Order of the British Empire (MBE) in the 2019 Birthday Honours for services to women's football in Wales.

Ludlow married former Arsenal teammate Ciara Grant.

== Managerial statistics ==
As of 1 December 2020

Team	From	To	Record				
Team	From	To	G	W	D	L	Win %
Reading	30 August 2013	2 October 2014	22	14	3	5	63.64
Wales	2 October 2014	19 January 2021	53	21	14	18	39.62
Total			75	35	17	23	46.67

== Honours ==
Arsenal

- UEFA Women's Cup: 2006–07
- FA Women's Premier League National Division: 2000–01, 2001–02, 2003–04, 2004–05, 2005–06, 2006–07, 2007–08, 2008–09, 2009–10
- FA WSL: 2011, 2012
- FA WSL Cup: 2011, 2012
- FA Women's Cup: 2000–01, 2003–04, 2005–06, 2006–07, 2007–08, 2008–09
- Women's League Cup: 2000–01, 2004–05, 2006–07, 2008–09

=== Individual ===
- FA Players' Player of the Year Award: 2000–01, 2002–03, 2003–04
- Welsh Sports Hall of Fame Roll of Honour: 2018
