= 2006–07 UEFA Women's Cup qualifying round =

Tournament details
- Dates: 8 August–17 September 2006
- Teams: 43

The 2006–07 UEFA Women's Champions League qualifying round was played on 8, 10, 13 August 2006 and 12, 14 and 17 September 2006. A total of 43 teams competed in the qualifying round to decide the 8 places in the knockout phase of the 2006–07 UEFA Women's Cup.

== First qualifying round ==
=== Group A1 ===
Matches were played in Zagreb, Croatia.

| Pos | Team | Pld | W | D | L | GF | GA | GD | Pts | Qualification | SAE | CAR | MAK | DUN |
|---|---|---|---|---|---|---|---|---|---|---|---|---|---|---|
| 1 | (Netherlands) Saestum | 3 | 3 | 0 | 0 | 15 | 1 | +14 | 9 | Advance to second qualifying round | — | – | 7–0 | 6–1 |
| 2 | (Wales) Cardiff City | 3 | 2 | 0 | 1 | 5 | 4 | +1 | 6 | | 0–2 | — | – | 2–0 |
| 3 | (Croatia) Maksimir (H) | 3 | 1 | 0 | 2 | 10 | 10 | 0 | 3 | | – | 2–3 | — | – |
| 4 | (Republic of Ireland) Dundalk | 3 | 0 | 0 | 3 | 1 | 16 | −15 | 0 | | – | – | 0–8 | — |

Source: RSSSF
(H) Hosts
8 August 2006

| Saestum (Netherlands) | 7–0 | (Croatia) Maksimir |
|---|---|---|
| Vermeulen 12', 29', 40'; Louwaars 46', 54'; van Eyck 51'; Bijl 80' | Report |

Hitrec-Kacijan, Zagreb
8 August 2006

| Cardiff City (Wales) | 2–0 | (Republic of Ireland) Dundalk |
|---|---|---|
| Dykes 37'; Harries 64' | Report |

Hitrec-Kacijan, Zagreb

10 August 2006

| Saestum (Netherlands) | 6–1 | (Republic of Ireland) Dundalk |
|---|---|---|
| van Eyck 1'; Vugts 15', 27'; Louwaars 59' (pen.); Hoogendijk 69'; Bijl 86' | Report | English 8' |

Hitrec-Kacijan, Zagreb
10 August 2006

| Maksimir (Croatia) | 2–3 | (Wales) Cardiff City |
|---|---|---|
| Glavač 32', 65' | Report | Beddows 18'; Barrow 33'; Miller 50' |

Hitrec-Kacijan, Zagreb

13 August 2006

| Cardiff City (Wales) | 0–2 | (Netherlands) Saestum |
|---|---|---|
| Cheedy 14' (o.g.); Vermeulen 43' | Report |

Hitrec-Kacijan, Zagreb
13 August 2006

| Dundalk (Republic of Ireland) | 0–8 | (Croatia) Maksimir |
|---|---|---|
| | Report | Jakšić 14', 33'; Glavač 22', 46', 64'; Pehić 52'; Landeka 88' (pen.); Koljenik 90+1' |

Stadion Maksimir, Zagreb

=== Group A2 ===
Matches were played in Livingston, Scotland.

| Pos | Team | Pld | W | D | L | GF | GA | GD | Pts | Qualification | ESP | JUV | HIB | KIK |
|---|---|---|---|---|---|---|---|---|---|---|---|---|---|---|
| 1 | (Spain) Espanyol | 3 | 3 | 0 | 0 | 12 | 1 | +11 | 9 | Advance to second qualifying round | — | – | – | 7–0 |
| 2 | (France) Juvisy | 3 | 2 | 0 | 1 | 12 | 1 | +11 | 6 | | 0–1 | — | – | 6–0 |
| 3 | (Scotland) Hibernian (H) | 3 | 1 | 0 | 2 | 3 | 11 | −8 | 3 | | 1–4 | 0–6 | — | – |
| 4 | (Faroe Islands) KÍ Klaksvík | 3 | 0 | 0 | 3 | 1 | 15 | −14 | 0 | | – | – | 1–2 | — |

Source: RSSSF
(H) Hosts
8 August 2006

| Juvisy (France) | 6–0 | (Faroe Islands) KÍ Klaksvík |
|---|---|---|
| Tonazzi 12'; Pichon 35', 42'; Lacroix 59'; Moresco 86'; Butel 89' | Report |

Almondvale Stadium, Livingston
8 August 2006

| Hibernian (Scotland) | 1–4 | (Spain) Espanyol |
|---|---|---|
| James 65' | Report | Cubí 10'; Serna 50'; Martín 78', 80' |

Almondvale Stadium, Livingston

10 August 2006

| Juvisy (France) | 0–1 | (Spain) Espanyol |
|---|---|---|
| | Report | Rubio 13' |

Almondvale Stadium, Livingston
10 August 2006

| KÍ Klaksvík (Faroe Islands) | 1–2 | (Scotland) Hibernian |
|---|---|---|
| Murray 41' (o.g.) | Report | Ross 73'; McBride 90+1' |

Almondvale Stadium, Livingston

13 August 2006

| Hibernian (Scotland) | 0–6 | (France) Juvisy |
|---|---|---|
| | Report | Tonazzi 8', 43', 56'; Pichon 67', 90'; Lacroix 86' |

Almondvale Stadium, Livingston
13 August 2006

| Espanyol (Spain) | 7–0 | (Faroe Islands) KÍ Klaksvík |
|---|---|---|
| Diéguez 20'; Cubí 27', 37', 58', 83'; Martín 63', 68' | Report |

Prestonfield, Linlithgow

=== Group A3 ===
Matches were played in Neulengbach, Austria.

| Pos | Team | Pld | W | D | L | GF | GA | GD | Pts | Qualification | BRE | NEU | DEZ | NEW |
|---|---|---|---|---|---|---|---|---|---|---|---|---|---|---|
| 1 | (Iceland) Breiðablik | 3 | 3 | 0 | 0 | 14 | 0 | +14 | 9 | Advance to second qualifying round | — | – | – | 7–0 |
| 2 | (Austria) Neulengbach (H) | 3 | 2 | 0 | 1 | 8 | 4 | +4 | 6 | | 0–3 | — | – | 5–1 |
| 3 | (Portugal) 1.º de Dezembro | 3 | 1 | 0 | 2 | 7 | 8 | −1 | 3 | | 0–4 | 0–3 | — | – |
| 4 | (Northern Ireland) Newtownabbey Strikers | 3 | 0 | 0 | 3 | 2 | 19 | −17 | 0 | | – | – | 1–7 | — |

Source: RSSSF
(H) Hosts
8 August 2006

| 1.º de Dezembro (Portugal) | 0–4 | (Iceland) Breiðablik |
|---|---|---|
| | Report | Sigurðardóttir 13', 29'; De Oliveira Reis 84' (o.g.); Steinarsdóttir 89' |

Wienerwaldstadion, Neulengbach
Referee: Eva Oedlund (Sweden)
8 August 2006

| Neulengbach (Austria) | 5–1 | (Northern Ireland) Newtownabbey Strikers |
|---|---|---|
| Liése Ribeiro 10'; Burger 31', 36'; Celouch 49'; Rosana 77' | Report | Clarke 75' |

Wienerwaldstadion, Neulengbach
Referee: Knarik Grigoryan (Armenia)

10 August 2006

| Newtownabbey Strikers (Northern Ireland) | 1–7 | (Portugal) 1.º de Dezembro |
|---|---|---|
| McKenna 86' | Report | Fernandes 32', 88'; Pinto 38', 42', 54', 58', 77' |

Wienerwaldstadion, Neulengbach
Referee: Carla De Boeck (Belgium)
10 August 2006

| Neulengbach (Austria) | 0–3 | (Iceland) Breiðablik |
|---|---|---|
| | Report | Samúelsdóttir 33', 47'; Sigurðardóttir 40' |

Wienerwaldstadion, Neulengbach

13 August 2006

| 1.º de Dezembro (Portugal) | 0–3 | (Austria) Neulengbach |
|---|---|---|
| | Report | Rosana 33' (pen.), 38'; Burger 82' |

Wienerwaldstadion, Neulengbach
Referee: Carla De Boeck (Belgium)
13 August 2006

| Breiðablik (Iceland) | 7–0 | (Northern Ireland) Newtownabbey Strikers |
|---|---|---|
| Friðriksdóttir 21', 61'; Sigurðardóttir 39', 84'; Magnúsdóttir 67', 70'; Samúelsdóttir 77' | Report |

Wienerwaldstadion, Neulengbach
Referee: Knarik Grigoryan (Armenia)

=== Group A4 ===
Matches were played in Strumica, North Macedonia.

| Pos | Team | Pld | W | D | L | GF | GA | GD | Pts | Qualification | HJK | WRO | ZUC | SKI |
|---|---|---|---|---|---|---|---|---|---|---|---|---|---|---|
| 1 | (Finland) HJK | 3 | 3 | 0 | 0 | 10 | 0 | +10 | 9 | Advance to second qualifying round | — | – | – | 7–0 |
| 2 | (Poland) AZS Wrocław | 3 | 1 | 1 | 1 | 6 | 4 | +2 | 4 | | 0–1 | — | – | 4–1 |
| 3 | (Switzerland) Zuchwil | 3 | 1 | 1 | 1 | 5 | 5 | 0 | 4 | | 0–2 | 2–2 | — | – |
| 4 | (North Macedonia) Skiponjat (H) | 3 | 0 | 0 | 3 | 2 | 14 | −12 | 0 | | – | – | 1–3 | — |

Source: RSSSF
(H) Hosts
8 August 2006

| AZS Wrocław (Poland) | 4–1 | (North Macedonia) Skiponjat |
|---|---|---|
| Okrasa 11'; Pożerska 13', 60', 89' | Report | Berisa 82' |

Stadion Blagoj Istatov, Strumica
8 August 2006

| Zuchwil (Switzerland) | 0–2 | (Finland) HJK |
|---|---|---|
| | Report | Sarapää 71'; Puranen 87' |

Stadion Kukuš, Strumica

10 August 2006

| AZS Wrocław (Poland) | 0–1 | (Finland) HJK |
|---|---|---|
| | Report | Ahonen 81' |

Stadion Blagoj Istatov, Strumica
10 August 2006

| Skiponjat (North Macedonia) | 1–3 | (Switzerland) Zuchwil |
|---|---|---|
| Salihi 37' | Report | Šundov 3'; Gaillard 46', 58' |

Stadion Kukuš, Strumica

12 August 2006

| Zuchwil (Switzerland) | 2–2 | (Poland) AZS Wrocław |
|---|---|---|
| Šundov 23', 60' | Report | Pożerska 9'; Bochra 90+1' |

Stadion Blagoj Istatov, Strumica
12 August 2006

| HJK (Finland) | 7–0 | (North Macedonia) Skiponjat |
|---|---|---|
| Puranen 29'; Ruutu 33', 60', 61'; Salmén 69'; Åman 79'; Hartikainen 82' | Report |

Stadion Kukuš, Strumica

=== Group A5 ===
Matches were played in Šiauliai, Lithuania.

| Pos | Team | Pld | W | D | L | GF | GA | GD | Pts | Qualification | UVI | FIA | SAR | GUN |
|---|---|---|---|---|---|---|---|---|---|---|---|---|---|---|
| 1 | (Belarus) Universitet Vitebsk | 3 | 2 | 0 | 1 | 2 | 1 | +1 | 6 | Advance to second qualifying round | — | 1–0 | – | 1–0 |
| 2 | (Italy) Fiammamonza | 3 | 2 | 0 | 1 | 4 | 1 | +3 | 6 | | – | — | – | 3–0 |
| 3 | (Bosnia and Herzegovina) SFK Sarajevo | 3 | 1 | 1 | 1 | 2 | 2 | 0 | 4 | | 1–0 | 0–1 | — | – |
| 4 | (Lithuania) Gintra-Universitetas (H) | 3 | 0 | 1 | 2 | 1 | 5 | −4 | 1 | | – | – | 1–1 | — |

Source: RSSSF
(H) Hosts
8 August 2006

| SFK Sarajevo (Bosnia and Herzegovina) | 0–1 | (Italy) Fiammamonza |
|---|---|---|
| | Report | Gazzoli 15' |

Savivaldybė Stadium, Šiauliai
8 August 2006

| Universitet Vitebsk (Belarus) | 1–0 | (Lithuania) Gintra-Universitetas |
|---|---|---|
| Ryzhova 34' | Report |

Savivaldybė Stadium, Šiauliai

10 August 2006

| Universitet Vitebsk (Belarus) | 1–0 | (Italy) Fiammamonza |
|---|---|---|
| Luchonak 23' | Report |

Savivaldybė Stadium, Šiauliai
10 August 2006

| Gintra-Universitetas (Lithuania) | 1–1 | (Bosnia and Herzegovina) SFK Sarajevo |
|---|---|---|
| Burokaitė 39' | Report | Đordić 26' |

Savivaldybė Stadium, Šiauliai

13 August 2006

| SFK Sarajevo (Bosnia and Herzegovina) | 1–0 | (Belarus) Universitet Vitebsk |
|---|---|---|
| Đordić 50' | Report |

Pakruojis Stadium, Pakruojis
13 August 2006

| Fiammamonza (Italy) | 3–0 | (Lithuania) Gintra-Universitetas |
|---|---|---|
| Balconi 26'; Ramera 35', 88' | Report |

Savivaldybė Stadium, Šiauliai

=== Group A6 ===
Matches were played in Lendava, Slovenia.

| Pos | Team | Pld | W | D | L | GF | GA | GD | Pts | Qualification | WEZ | MCN | POM | PAR |
|---|---|---|---|---|---|---|---|---|---|---|---|---|---|---|
| 1 | (Belgium) Rapide Wezemaal | 3 | 3 | 0 | 0 | 18 | 1 | +17 | 9 | Advance to second qualifying round | — | 6–1 | 5–0 | – |
| 2 | (Serbia) Mašinac Classic Niš | 3 | 2 | 0 | 1 | 10 | 9 | +1 | 6 | | – | — | 3–2 | 6–1 |
| 3 | (Slovenia) Pomurje (H) | 3 | 1 | 0 | 2 | 9 | 9 | 0 | 3 | | – | – | — | 7–1 |
| 4 | (Estonia) Pärnu JK | 3 | 0 | 0 | 3 | 2 | 20 | −18 | 0 | | 0–7 | – | – | — |

Source: RSSSF
(H) Hosts
8 August 2006

| Mašinac Classic Niš (Serbia) | 6–1 | (Estonia) Pärnu JK |
|---|---|---|
| Dobrosavljević 20'; Sretenović 36'; Pesić 37'; Jovanović 43'; Krstić 59'; Trajković 72' | Report | Skljarenko 10' |

Fazanerija City Stadium, Murska Sobota
Referee: Ivana Kosturova (Slovakia)
8 August 2006

| Rapide Wezemaal (Belgium) | 5–0 | (Slovenia) Pomurje |
|---|---|---|
| Meeus 23'; Maes 30', 75'; Verelst 39'; Van de Goor 50' | Report |

Lendava Sports Park, Lendava
Referee: Bibiana Steinhaus (Germany)

10 August 2006

| Pärnu JK (Estonia) | 0–7 | (Belgium) Rapide Wezemaal |
|---|---|---|
| | Report | Verelst 15', 31'; Maes 19'; Heiremans 60'; Courtois 65'; Meeus 77'; Torreele 90' |

Lendava Sports Park, Lendava
Referee: Bibiana Steinhaus (Germany)
10 August 2006

| Mašinac Classic Niš (Serbia) | 3–2 | (Slovenia) Pomurje |
|---|---|---|
| Pesić 38'; Nikolić 67'; Sretenović 82' | Report | Nikl 29'; Zver 52' |

Fazanerija City Stadium, Murska Sobota
Referee: Martina Blahova (Czech Republic)

13 August 2006

| Rapide Wezemaal (Belgium) | 6–1 | (Serbia) Mašinac Classic Niš |
|---|---|---|
| Meeus 2', 67'; Maes 16', 19'; Verelst 47', 76' | Report | Jovanović 22' |

Fazanerija City Stadium, Murska Sobota
Referee: Ivana Kosturova (Slovakia)
13 August 2006

| Pomurje (Slovenia) | 7–1 | (Estonia) Pärnu JK |
|---|---|---|
| Govek 18', 43'; Zver 30', 48', 90+1'; Nikl 68', 83' | Report | Zsuiko 10' |

Lendava Sports Park, Lendava
Referee: Martina Blahova (Czech Republic)

=== Group A7 ===
Matches were played in Močenok, Slovakia.

| Pos | Team | Pld | W | D | L | GF | GA | GD | Pts | Qualification | ROS | ALM | SDŠ | CLU |
|---|---|---|---|---|---|---|---|---|---|---|---|---|---|---|
| 1 | (Russia) Rossiyanka | 3 | 3 | 0 | 0 | 18 | 3 | +15 | 9 | Advance to second qualifying round | — | – | – | 7–0 |
| 2 | (Kazakhstan) Alma | 3 | 2 | 0 | 1 | 11 | 9 | +2 | 6 | | 2–5 | — | 5–2 | – |
| 3 | (Slovakia) Slovan Šaľa (H) | 3 | 1 | 0 | 2 | 4 | 11 | −7 | 3 | | 1–6 | – | — | – |
| 4 | (Romania) Clujana Cluj-Napoca | 3 | 0 | 0 | 3 | 2 | 12 | −10 | 0 | | – | 2–4 | 0–1 | — |

Source: RSSSF
(H) Hosts
8 August 2006

| Alma (Kazakhstan) | 2–5 | (Russia) Rossiyanka |
|---|---|---|
| Li 66'; Kostova 69' | Report | Egorova 7'; Mokshanova 16'; Letyushova 56'; Verezubova 60'; Kremleva 74' |

ŠK Eldus Močenok Stadium, Močenok
8 August 2006

| Clujana Cluj-Napoca (Romania) | 0–1 | (Slovakia) Slovan Šaľa |
|---|---|---|
| | Report | Dugovičová 53' |

Šaľa Stadium, Šaľa

10 August 2006

| Rossiyanka (Russia) | 7–0 | (Romania) Clujana Cluj-Napoca |
|---|---|---|
| Skotnikova 18'; Letyushova 40' (pen.), 44'; Egorova 48'; Kremleva 75', 76', 84' | Report |

ŠK Eldus Močenok Stadium, Močenok
10 August 2006

| Alma (Kazakhstan) | 5–2 | (Slovakia) Slovan Šaľa |
|---|---|---|
| Mereshenok 11', 90+1'; Kostova 33', 77'; Aniskovtseva 85' | Report | Javorová 20'; Dugovičová 32' (pen.) |

Šaľa Stadium, Šaľa

13 August 2006

| Clujana Cluj-Napoca (Romania) | 2–4 | (Kazakhstan) Alma |
|---|---|---|
| Striblea 52'; Spânu 85' | Report | Ilinca 61' (o.g.); Mereshenok 69', 71'; Svetlitskaya 83' |

ŠK Eldus Močenok Stadium, Močenok
13 August 2006

| Slovan Šaľa (Slovakia) | 1–6 | (Russia) Rossiyanka |
|---|---|---|
| Javorová 75' | Report | Barbashina 1'; Tsydikova 26'; Mokshanova 36'; Shmachkova 60'; Skotnikova 77'; Letyushova 90' |

Šaľa Stadium, Šaľa

=== Group A8 ===
Matches were played at imeni Yuriya Gagarina and Tekstylnyk stadium, Chernihiv, Ukraine.

| Pos | Team | Pld | W | D | L | GF | GA | GD | Pts | Qualification | LCH | MHO | PAOK | KOK |
|---|---|---|---|---|---|---|---|---|---|---|---|---|---|---|
| 1 | (Ukraine) Lehenda (H) | 3 | 3 | 0 | 0 | 12 | 0 | +12 | 9 | Advance to second qualifying round | — | – | 5–0 | 4–0 |
| 2 | (Israel) Maccabi Holon | 3 | 1 | 1 | 1 | 6 | 4 | +2 | 4 | | 0–3 | — | 1–1 | – |
| 3 | (Greece) PAOK | 3 | 1 | 1 | 1 | 6 | 8 | −2 | 4 | | – | – | — | 5–2 |
| 4 | (Cyprus) AEK Kokkinochorion | 3 | 0 | 0 | 3 | 2 | 14 | −12 | 0 | | – | 0–5 | – | — |

Source: RSSSF
(H) Hosts
8 August 2006

| Lehenda (Ukraine) | 4–0 | (Cyprus) AEK Kokkinochorion |
|---|---|---|
| Bondarenko 3', 32'; Sokolenko 66'; Zhdanova 89' | Report |

Chernihiv Stadium, Chernihiv
8 August 2006

| Maccabi Holon (Israel) | 1–1 | (Greece) PAOK |
|---|---|---|
| Jan 52' | Report | Panteliadou 57' |

Tekstylnyk stadium, Chernihiv

10 August 2006

| AEK Kokkinochorion (Cyprus) | 0–5 | (Israel) Maccabi Holon |
|---|---|---|
| | Report | Fahima 10', 30'; Jan 19', 58', 87' |

Tekstylnyk stadium, Chernihiv
10 August 2006

| Lehenda (Ukraine) | 5–0 | (Greece) PAOK |
|---|---|---|
| Lyshafay 18'; Kornievets 34', 60'; Bondarenko 46'; Andrushchak 84' | Report |

Chernihiv Stadium, Chernihiv

13 August 2006

| Maccabi Holon (Israel) | 0–3 | (Ukraine) Lehenda |
|---|---|---|
| | Report | Sokolenko 23'; Krylova 36' (pen.); Kornievets 78' |

Chernihiv Stadium, Chernihiv
13 August 2006

| PAOK (Greece) | 5–2 | (Cyprus) AEK Kokkinochorion |
|---|---|---|
| Tsiapanou 30'; Kynossidou 51'; Blatsas 58'; Panteliadou 60', 63' | Report | Peletidou 64' (o.g.); Alexi 77' |

Tekstylnyk stadium, Chernihiv

=== Group A9 ===
Matches were played in Pravets, Bulgaria.

| Pos | Team | Pld | W | D | L | GF | GA | GD | Pts | Qualification | FEM | NSA | NCH | GBA |
|---|---|---|---|---|---|---|---|---|---|---|---|---|---|---|
| 1 | (Hungary) Femina | 3 | 3 | 0 | 0 | 15 | 1 | +14 | 9 | Advance to second qualifying round | — | – | 7–0 | – |
| 2 | (Bulgaria) NSA Sofia (H) | 3 | 2 | 0 | 1 | 10 | 2 | +8 | 6 | | 0–1 | — | – | 7–0 |
| 3 | (Moldova) Narta Chişinău | 3 | 1 | 0 | 2 | 3 | 11 | −8 | 3 | | – | 1–3 | — | – |
| 4 | (Azerbaijan) Gömrükçü Baku | 3 | 0 | 0 | 3 | 2 | 16 | −14 | 0 | | 1–7 | – | 1–2 | — |

Source: RSSSF
(H) Hosts
8 August 2006

| Gömrükçü Baku (Azerbaijan) | 1–7 | (Hungary) Femina |
|---|---|---|
| Guliyeva 5' | Report | Sümegi 16', 90+4'; Dombai-Nagy 41', 46', 65'; Pádár 58'; Fog 90+2' |

Pravets Sports Complex, Pravets
8 August 2006

| Narta Chişinău (Moldova) | 1–3 | (Bulgaria) NSA Sofia |
|---|---|---|
| Smidt 77' | Report | Boyanova 37'; Zhekova 45+1'; Pavlova 76' |

Pravets Sports Complex, Pravets

10 August 2006

| Gömrükçü Baku (Azerbaijan) | 1–2 | (Moldova) Narta Chişinău |
|---|---|---|
| Osmanova 83' | Report | Ninicu 31'; Dominges 62' (o.g.) |

Pravets Sports Complex, Pravets
10 August 2006

| NSA Sofia (Bulgaria) | 0–1 | (Hungary) Femina |
|---|---|---|
| | Report | Pádár 17' |

Pravets Sports Complex, Pravets

13 August 2006

| NSA Sofia (Bulgaria) | 7–0 | (Azerbaijan) Gömrükçü Baku |
|---|---|---|
| Petrakieva 37'; Traykova 39'; Davidova 61'; Boyanova 64', 76'; Pavlova 85'; Gospodinova 90' | Report |

Pravets Sports Complex, Pravets
13 August 2006

| Femina (Hungary) | 7–0 | (Moldova) Narta Chişinău |
|---|---|---|
| Sebestyén 44', 62'; Dombai-Nagy 49' (pen.), 66'; Fogl 56'; Benkő 70'; Pádár 81' | Report |

Pravets Sports Complex, Pravets

== Second qualifying round ==
=== Group B1 ===
Matches were played in Helsinki, Finland.

| Pos | Team | Pld | W | D | L | GF | GA | GD | Pts | Qualification | FRA | BRE | HJK | UVI |
|---|---|---|---|---|---|---|---|---|---|---|---|---|---|---|
| 1 | (Germany) Frankfurt | 3 | 3 | 0 | 0 | 12 | 0 | +12 | 9 | Advance to quarter-finals | — | 5–0 | – | 5–0 |
| 2 | (Iceland) Breiðablik | 3 | 2 | 0 | 1 | 3 | 6 | −3 | 6 | Advance to quarter-finals | – | — | – | 1–0 |
| 3 | (Finland) HJK (H) | 3 | 0 | 1 | 2 | 1 | 4 | −3 | 1 | | 0–2 | 1–2 | — | – |
| 4 | (Belarus) Universitet Vitebsk | 3 | 0 | 1 | 2 | 0 | 6 | −6 | 1 | | – | – | 0–0 | — |

Source: RSSSF
(H) Hosts
12 September 2006

| HJK (Finland) | 1–2 | (Iceland) Breiðablik |
|---|---|---|
| Puranen 69' | Report | Viðarsdóttir 56'; Samúelsdóttir 90+2' |

Helsinki Olympic Stadium, Helsinki
12 September 2006

| Frankfurt (Germany) | 5–0 | (Belarus) Universitet Vitebsk |
|---|---|---|
| Smisek 25'; Prinz 44'; Lingor 55'; Bartusiak 64'; Hansen 90' | Report |

Helsinki Olympic Stadium, Helsinki

14 September 2006

| Frankfurt (Germany) | 5–0 | (Iceland) Breiðablik |
|---|---|---|
| Lingor 25', 84'; Garefrekes 51', 68'; Wimbersky 77' | Report |

Helsinki Olympic Stadium, Helsinki
14 September 2006

| Universitet Vitebsk (Belarus) | 0–0 | (Finland) HJK |
|---|---|---|
| | Report |

Helsinki Olympic Stadium, Helsinki

17 September 2006

| HJK (Finland) | 0–2 | (Germany) Frankfurt |
|---|---|---|
| | Report | Affeld 41'; Garefrekes 54' |

Helsinki Olympic Stadium, Helsinki
17 September 2006

| Breiðablik (Iceland) | 1–0 | (Belarus) Universitet Vitebsk |
|---|---|---|
| Samúelsdóttir 89' | Report |

Töölön Pallokenttä, Helsinki

=== Group B2 ===
Matches were played at Sofiemyr stadion, Sofiemyr and Askim stadion, Askim, Norway.

| Pos | Team | Pld | W | D | L | GF | GA | GD | Pts | Qualification | UME | KOL | ESP | LCH |
|---|---|---|---|---|---|---|---|---|---|---|---|---|---|---|
| 1 | (Sweden) Umeå | 3 | 3 | 0 | 0 | 7 | 1 | +6 | 9 | Advance to quarter-finals | — | – | 3–0 | 2–0 |
| 2 | (Norway) Kolbotn (H) | 3 | 2 | 0 | 1 | 7 | 5 | +2 | 6 | Advance to quarter-finals | 1–2 | — | 4–2 | – |
| 3 | (Spain) Espanyol | 3 | 1 | 0 | 2 | 7 | 7 | 0 | 3 | | – | – | — | 5–0 |
| 4 | (Ukraine) Lehenda | 3 | 0 | 0 | 3 | 1 | 9 | −8 | 0 | | – | 1–2 | – | — |

Source: RSSSF
(H) Hosts
12 September 2006

| Kolbotn (Norway) | 4–2 | (Spain) Espanyol |
|---|---|---|
| Schjelderup 18'; Gulbrandsen 43'; Hansen 56', 76' | Report | Martín 58'; Lindblom 85' (o.g.) |

Sofiemyr stadion, Kolbotn
12 September 2006

| Umeå (Sweden) | 2–0 | (Ukraine) Lehenda |
|---|---|---|
| Marta 15'; Elaine 56' | Report |

Askim kunstgress, Askim

14 September 2006

| Umeå (Sweden) | 3–0 | (Spain) Espanyol |
|---|---|---|
| Ljungberg 3'; Klaveness 27'; Moström 90+3' | Report |

Sofiemyr stadion, Kolbotn
14 September 2006

| Lehenda (Ukraine) | 1–2 | (Norway) Kolbotn |
|---|---|---|
| Lyshafay 87' | Report | Rønning 39'; Huse 45' |

Askim kunstgress, Askim

17 September 2006

| Kolbotn (Norway) | 1–2 | (Sweden) Umeå |
|---|---|---|
| Blystad-Bjerke 83' | Report | Klaveness 4'; Stensland 89' |

Sofiemyr stadion, Kolbotn
17 September 2006

| Espanyol (Spain) | 5–0 | (Ukraine) Lehenda |
|---|---|---|
| Serna 14', 45'; Martín 21'; Rubio 58'; Cubí 87' | Report |

Askim kunstgress, Askim

=== Group B3 ===
Matches were played in Zeist, Netherlands.

| Pos | Team | Pld | W | D | L | GF | GA | GD | Pts | Qualification | TPO | SAE | WEZ | SPR |
|---|---|---|---|---|---|---|---|---|---|---|---|---|---|---|
| 1 | (Germany) Turbine Potsdam | 3 | 2 | 1 | 0 | 7 | 2 | +5 | 7 | Advance to quarter-finals | — | 2–2 | 1–0 | – |
| 2 | (Netherlands) Saestum (H) | 3 | 2 | 1 | 0 | 7 | 3 | +4 | 7 | Advance to quarter-finals | – | — | 2–0 | – |
| 3 | (Belgium) Rapide Wezemaal | 3 | 1 | 0 | 2 | 4 | 5 | −1 | 3 | | – | – | — | 4–2 |
| 4 | (Czech Republic) Sparta Prague | 3 | 0 | 0 | 3 | 3 | 11 | −8 | 0 | | 0–4 | 1–3 | – | — |

Source: RSSSF
(H) Hosts
12 September 2006

| Turbine Potsdam (Germany) | 1–0 | (Belgium) Rapide Wezemaal |
|---|---|---|
| Pohlers 79' | Report |

Sportpark Saestum, Zeist
12 September 2006

| Sparta Prague (Czech Republic) | 1–3 | (Netherlands) Saestum |
|---|---|---|
| Došková 11' | Report | Smith 6'; Hoogendijk 17'; Louwaars 90+2' |

Sportpark Saestum, Zeist

14 September 2006

| Rapide Wezemaal (Belgium) | 4–2 | (Czech Republic) Sparta Prague |
|---|---|---|
| Maes 26'; Timmermans 68'; Van de Goor 82'; Meeus 89' | Report | Bertholdová 4'; Mocová 9' |

Sportpark Saestum, Zeist
14 September 2006

| Turbine Potsdam (Germany) | 2–2 | (Netherlands) Saestum |
|---|---|---|
| Pohlers 24', 43' | Report | Louwaars 22'; Van den Boogaard 37' |

Sportpark Saestum, Zeist

17 September 2006

| Sparta Prague (Czech Republic) | 0–4 | (Germany) Turbine Potsdam |
|---|---|---|
| | Report | Kerschowski 6'; Hingst 17'; Pohlers 33'; Kameraj 87' |

Sportpark de Woerd, Driebergen-Rijsenburg
17 September 2006

| Saestum (Netherlands) | 2–0 | (Belgium) Rapide Wezemaal |
|---|---|---|
| Louwaars 52' (pen.); Hoogendijk 85' | Report |

Sportpark Saestum, Zeist

=== Group B4 ===
Matches were played in Krasnoarmeysk, Russia.

| Pos | Team | Pld | W | D | L | GF | GA | GD | Pts | Qualification | ARS | BRØ | ROS | FEM |
|---|---|---|---|---|---|---|---|---|---|---|---|---|---|---|
| 1 | (England) Arsenal | 3 | 3 | 0 | 0 | 12 | 4 | +8 | 9 | Advance to quarter-finals | — | 1–0 | 5–4 | – |
| 2 | (Denmark) Brøndby | 3 | 2 | 0 | 1 | 7 | 3 | +4 | 6 | Advance to quarter-finals | – | — | 2–1 | 5–1 |
| 3 | (Russia) Rossiyanka (H) | 3 | 1 | 0 | 2 | 9 | 9 | 0 | 3 | | – | – | — | 4–2 |
| 4 | (Hungary) Femina | 3 | 0 | 0 | 3 | 3 | 15 | −12 | 0 | | 0–6 | – | – | — |

Source: RSSSF
(H) Hosts
12 September 2006

| Brøndby (Denmark) | 5–1 | (Hungary) Femina |
|---|---|---|
| Paaske Sørensen 6', 9', 26'; Bukh 67'; Konge 83' | Report | Dombai-Nagy 44' |

Stadion Rossiyanka, Krasnoarmeysk
12 September 2006

| Arsenal (England) | 5–4 | (Russia) Rossiyanka |
|---|---|---|
| Fleeting 1', 21', 42', 49', 64' | Report | Morozova 4'; Barbashina 51'; Verezubova 68'; Letyushova 85' |

Stadion Rossiyanka, Krasnoarmeysk
Referee: Cristina Dorcioman (Romania)

14 September 2006

| Femina (Hungary) | 0–6 | (England) Arsenal |
|---|---|---|
| | Report | Paraoanu 21' (o.g.); Ludlow 22', 72'; Chapman 61'; Yankey 67'; Davison 79' |

Stadion Rossiyanka, Krasnoarmeysk
Referee: Gordana Kuzmanovic (Socialist Federal Republic of Yugoslavia)
14 September 2006

| Brøndby (Denmark) | 2–1 | (Russia) Rossiyanka |
|---|---|---|
| Eggers 40'; Nielsen 43' | Report | Verezubova 14' |

Stadion Rossiyanka, Krasnoarmeysk

17 September 2006

| Arsenal (England) | 1–0 | (Denmark) Brøndby |
|---|---|---|
| Sanderson 48' | Report |

Podmoskovie Stadium, Shchyolkovo
17 September 2006

| Rossiyanka (Russia) | 4–2 | (Hungary) Femina |
|---|---|---|
| Tsybutovich 8'; Morozova 19'; Mokshanova 22'; Sergaeva 26' | Report | Dombai-Nagy 38', 41' |

Stadion Rossiyanka, Krasnoarmeysk
