= 2006 in Norwegian football =

Football in Norway
- Season: 2006

Men's football
- Tippeligaen: Rosenborg
- 1. divisjon: Strømsgodset
- 2. divisjon: Notodden (Group 1); Skeid (Group 2); Mandalskameratene (Group 3); Raufoss (Group 4)
- Cupen: Fredrikstad

Women's football
- Toppserien: Kolbotn
- 1. divisjon: Asker
- Cupen: Røa

The 2006 season was the 101st season of competitive football in Norway.

== Men's football ==
=== League season ===
==== Promotion and relegation ====
League	Promoted to league	Relegated from league
Tippeligaen	Stabæk; Sandefjord	Aalesund; Bodø/Glimt
1. divisjon	Sarpsborg Sparta; Manglerud Star; Haugesund; Tromsdalen	Mandalskameratene; Skeid; Tønsberg; Alta
2. divisjon	Korsvoll; Vålerenga 2; HamKam 2; Åmot; Stabæk 2; Start 2; Kopervik; Askøy; Kristiansund; KIL/Hemne; Steigen; Hammerfest	Mercantile; Kvik Halden; Fram Larvik; Træff; Frigg; FF Lillehammer; Egersund; Hovding; Brann 2; Lyngen/Karnes; Lofoten; Innstranden

==== Tippeligaen ====
Pos	Team	Pld	W	D	L	GF	GA	GD	Pts	Qualification or relegation
1	Rosenborg (C)	26	15	8	3	47	24	+23	53	Qualification for the Champions League second qualifying round
2	Brann	26	14	4	8	39	36	+3	46	Qualification for the UEFA Cup first qualifying round (Note: Lillestrøm qualified for the UEFA Cup first qualifying round through the UEFA Fair Play ranking award.)
3	Vålerenga	26	13	5	8	43	28	+15	44	Qualification for the UEFA Cup first qualifying round
4	Lillestrøm	26	12	8	6	44	33	+11	44	Qualification for the UEFA Cup first qualifying round
5	Stabæk	26	10	9	7	53	36	+17	39	
6	Start	26	10	7	9	29	32	−3	37	
7	Lyn	26	10	5	11	33	36	−3	35	
8	Fredrikstad	26	8	8	10	38	46	−8	32	Qualification for the UEFA Cup second qualifying round (Note: Fredrikstad qualified for the UEFA Cup second qualifying round after winning the Norwegian Cup.)
9	Sandefjord	26	9	5	12	37	47	−10	32	
10	Tromsø	26	8	5	13	33	39	−6	29	
11	Viking	26	8	5	13	31	37	−6	29	
12	Odd Grenland (O)	26	7	8	11	30	38	−8	29	Qualification for the relegation play-offs
13	Ham-Kam (R)	26	7	7	12	35	39	−4	28	Relegation to First Division
14	Molde (R)	26	7	4	15	29	50	−21	25	Relegation to First Division

Source: fotball.no
Rules for classification: 1) points; 2) goal difference; 3) number of goals scored.
(C) Champions; (O) Play-off winners; (R) Relegated

==== 1. divisjon ====
Pos	Team	Pld	W	D	L	GF	GA	GD	Pts	Promotion or relegation
1	Strømsgodset (C, P)	30	20	5	5	68	36	+32	65	Promotion to Tippeligaen
2	Aalesund (P)	30	17	9	4	71	35	+36	60	Promotion to Tippeligaen
3	Bryne	30	14	10	6	52	44	+8	52	Qualification for the promotion play-offs (Note: The third-placed team in the first division and the 12th-placed team in Tippeligaen meet in a playoff at the end of the season.)
4	Hønefoss	30	15	6	9	64	47	+17	51	
5	Bodø/Glimt	30	14	7	9	65	49	+16	49	
6	Sogndal	30	11	11	8	43	41	+2	44	
7	Kongsvinger	30	11	10	9	39	42	−3	43	
8	Moss	30	11	7	12	61	46	+15	40	
9	Haugesund	30	11	5	14	40	37	+3	38	
10	Sparta Sarpsborg	30	11	6	13	44	56	−12	37 (Note: Sparta Sarpsborg have been deducted 2 points.)	
11	Løv-Ham	30	8	11	11	38	40	−2	35	
12	Tromsdalen	30	8	11	11	48	52	−4	35	
13	Pors Grenland (R)	30	10	5	15	51	65	−14	35	Relegation to Second Division
14	Manglerud Star (R)	30	7	7	16	47	79	−32	28	Relegation to Second Division
15	Follo (R)	30	6	7	17	46	76	−30	25	Relegation to Second Division
16	Hødd (R)	30	4	7	19	29	61	−32	19	Relegation to Second Division

Source: nifs.no
(C) Champions; (P) Promoted; (R) Relegated

==== 2. divisjon ====
===== Group 1 =====
Pos	Team	Pld	W	D	L	GF	GA	GD	Pts	Promotion or relegation
1	Notodden (P)	26	16	10	0	66	26	+40	58	Promotion to First Division
2	Bærum	26	17	5	4	60	28	+32	56	
3	Lørenskog	26	17	3	6	78	36	+42	54	
4	FK Tønsberg	26	14	8	4	61	26	+35	50	
5	Sprint/Jeløy	26	12	7	7	50	40	+10	43	
6	Drøbak/Frogn	26	10	6	10	59	47	+12	36	
7	Stabæk 2	26	9	5	12	48	39	+9	32	
8	Sarpsborg	26	9	4	13	45	61	−16	31	
9	Odd Grenland 2	26	9	3	14	46	64	−18	30	
10	Vålerenga 2	26	8	4	14	44	61	−17	28	
11	Åmot	26	8	3	15	33	59	−26	27	
12	Tollnes (R)	26	7	5	14	31	59	−28	26	Relegation to Third Division
13	Ørn-Horten (R)	26	5	6	15	33	77	−44	21	Relegation to Third Division
14	Årdal (R)	26	5	3	18	38	69	−31	18	Relegation to Third Division

(P) Promoted; (R) Relegated

===== Group 2 =====
Pos	Team	Pld	W	D	L	GF	GA	GD	Pts	Promotion or relegation
1	Skeid (P)	26	20	3	3	67	23	+44	63	Promotion to First Division
2	Groruddalen	26	16	7	3	73	39	+34	55	
3	Ranheim	26	13	6	7	63	40	+23	45	
4	Rosenborg 2	26	13	3	10	60	47	+13	42	
5	Strindheim	26	12	4	10	53	48	+5	40	
6	Byåsen	26	12	2	12	65	48	+17	38	
7	Kristiansund	26	11	5	10	44	33	+11	38	
8	Korsvoll	26	11	3	12	58	59	−1	36	
9	Steinkjer	26	11	3	12	56	59	−3	36	
10	Kjelsås	26	10	3	13	36	55	−19	33	
11	Molde 2 (R)	26	10	1	15	42	65	−23	31	Relegation to Third Division
12	Levanger	26	7	8	11	48	50	−2	29	
13	Kolstad (R)	26	6	3	17	47	84	−37	21	Relegation to Third Division
14	KIL/Hemne (R)	26	3	3	20	29	91	−62	12	Relegation to Third Division

(P) Promoted; (R) Relegated

===== Group 3 =====
Pos	Team	Pld	W	D	L	GF	GA	GD	Pts	Promotion or relegation
1	Mandalskameratene (P)	26	20	3	3	75	24	+51	63	Promotion to First Division
2	Sandnes Ulf	26	15	7	4	50	32	+18	52	
3	Vard Haugesund	26	14	4	8	62	39	+23	46	
4	Fyllingen	26	13	6	7	46	38	+8	45	
5	Start 2	26	12	5	9	59	50	+9	41	
6	Ålgård	26	11	5	10	48	51	−3	38	
7	Flekkerøy	26	11	4	11	50	45	+5	37	
8	Fana	26	11	3	12	54	57	−3	36	
9	Viking 2	26	11	2	13	46	54	−8	35	
10	Åsane	26	8	3	15	37	47	−10	27	
11	Askøy	26	8	3	15	36	62	−26	27	
12	Kopervik (R)	26	6	6	14	42	54	−12	24	Relegation to Third Division
13	Stord Sunnhordland (Note: Stord Sunnhordland was docked two points for using two non-eligible players.) (R)	26	7	4	15	33	55	−22	23	Relegation to Third Division
14	Klepp (R)	26	4	7	15	20	50	−30	19	Relegation to Third Division

(P) Promoted; (R) Relegated

===== Group 4 =====
Pos	Team	Pld	W	D	L	GF	GA	GD	Pts	Promotion or relegation
1	Raufoss (P)	26	17	6	3	72	38	+34	57	Promotion to First Division
2	Alta	26	16	6	4	75	36	+39	54	
3	Nybergsund	26	15	8	3	63	30	+33	53	
4	Eidsvold Turn	26	14	6	6	55	33	+22	48	
5	Mo	26	12	3	11	60	48	+12	39	
6	Ullensaker/Kisa	26	10	9	7	45	43	+2	39	
7	Harstad	26	10	3	13	47	54	−7	33	
8	Lillestrøm 2	26	9	5	12	47	48	−1	32	
9	Ham-Kam 2 (R)	26	10	2	14	40	49	−9	32	Relegation to Third Division
10	Gjøvik-Lyn	26	9	4	13	55	69	−14	31	
11	Hammerfest	26	8	5	13	35	50	−15	29	
12	Skarp	26	9	2	15	46	73	−27	29	
13	Brumunddal (R)	26	7	5	14	45	58	−13	26	Relegation to Third Division
14	Steigen (R)	26	3	2	21	33	89	−56	11	Relegation to Third Division

(P) Promoted; (R) Relegated

=== Norwegian Cup ===
==== Final ====
12 November 2006
13:15 CET (UTC+1)

Fredrikstad	3–0	Sandefjord
Ramberg 5'; Piiroja 37', 43'	Report

Ullevaal Stadion, Oslo
Attendance: 25,102
Referee: Tom Henning Øvrebø (Nordstrand)

== Women's football ==
=== League season ===
==== Promotion and relegation ====
League	Promoted to league	Relegated from league
Toppserien	Arna-Bjørnar; Amazon Grimstad	Asker; Kattem
1. divisjon	Haugar; Manglerud Star	Byåsen; Kaupanger

==== Toppserien ====
Pos	Team	Pld	W	D	L	GF	GA	GD	Pts	Qualification or relegation
1	Kolbotn (C)	18	13	3	2	76	17	+59	42	Qualification for the UEFA Women's Cup second qualifying round
2	Trondheims-Ørn	18	13	3	2	47	10	+37	42	
3	Røa	18	12	3	3	69	24	+45	39	
4	Team Strømmen	18	12	2	4	47	25	+22	38	
5	Arna-Bjørnar	18	11	2	5	60	26	+34	35	
6	Amazon Grimstad	18	7	2	9	42	32	+10	23	
7	Fløya	18	4	2	12	24	57	−33	14	
8	Sandviken	18	4	1	13	25	63	−38	13	
9	Klepp (O)	18	3	2	13	17	61	−44	11	Qualification for the relegation play-offs
10	Liungen (R)	18	1	0	17	10	102	−92	3	Qualification for the relegation play-offs

Source: NIFS
Rules for classification: 1) points; 2) goal difference; 3) number of goals scored.
(C) Champions; (O) Play-off winners; (R) Relegated

=== Norwegian Women's Cup ===
==== Final ====
- Røa 3–2 Asker

== Men's UEFA competitions ==
=== Champions League ===
==== Qualifying rounds ====
===== Second qualifying round =====
Team 1	Agg.	Team 2	1st leg	2nd leg
Mladá Boleslav (Czech Republic)	5–3	(Norway) Vålerenga	3–1	2–2

=== UEFA Cup ===
==== Qualifying rounds ====
===== First qualifying round =====
Team 1	Agg.	Team 2	1st leg	2nd leg
Glentoran (Northern Ireland)	0–2	(Norway) Brann	0–1	0–1
Skála (Faroe Islands)	0–4	(Norway) Start	0–1	0–3
Lyn Oslo (Norway)	1–1 (a)	(Estonia) Flora Tallinn	1–1	0–0

===== Second qualifying round =====
Team 1	Agg.	Team 2	1st leg	2nd leg
Start (Norway)	1–1 (11–10 p)	(Republic of Ireland) Drogheda United	1–0	0–1 (a.e.t.)
Brann (Norway)	4–4 (a)	(Sweden) Åtvidaberg	3–3	1–1
Molde (Norway)	2–1	(Latvia) Skonto	0–0	2–1

==== First round ====
Team 1	Agg.	Team 2	1st leg	2nd leg
Molde (Norway)	0–2	(Scotland) Rangers	0–0	0–2
Start (Norway)	2–9	(Netherlands) Ajax	2–5	0–4

=== Intertoto Cup ===
==== Second round ====
Team 1	Agg.	Team 2	1st leg	2nd leg
Lillestrøm (Norway)	6–3	(Iceland) Keflavík	4–1	2–2

==== Third round ====
Team 1	Agg.	Team 2	1st leg	2nd leg
Newcastle United (England)	4–1	(Norway) Lillestrøm	1–1	3–0

== UEFA Women's Cup ==
=== Second qualifying round ===
==== Group 2 ====
Pos	Team	Pld	W	D	L	GF	GA	GD	Pts	Qualification	UME	KOL	ESP	LCH
1	(Sweden) Umeå	3	3	0	0	7	1	+6	9	Advance to quarter-finals	—	–	3–0	2–0
2	(Norway) Kolbotn (H)	3	2	0	1	7	5	+2	6	Advance to quarter-finals	1–2	—	4–2	–
3	(Spain) Espanyol	3	1	0	2	7	7	0	3		–	–	—	5–0
4	(Ukraine) Lehenda	3	0	0	3	1	9	−8	0		–	1–2	–	—

Source: RSSSF
(H) Hosts

Matches

Kolbotn 4–2 RCD Espanyol
Lehenda-Cheksil Chernihiv 1–2 Kolbotn
Kolbotn 1–2 Umeå IK

== National teams ==
=== Norway men's national football team ===
==== UEFA Euro 2008 qualifying ====
===== Group C =====
Pos	Team	Pld	W	D	L	GF	GA	GD	Pts	Qualification	(Greece)	(Turkey)	(Norway)	(Bosnia and Herzegovina)	(Moldova)	(Hungary)	(Malta)
1	Greece	12	10	1	1	25	10	+15	31	Qualify for final tournament	—	1–4	1–0	3–2	2–1	2–0	5–0
2	Turkey	12	7	3	2	25	11	+14	24	Qualify for final tournament	0–1	—	2–2	1–0	5–0	3–0	2–0
3	Norway	12	7	2	3	27	11	+16	23		2–2	1–2	—	1–2	2–0	4–0	4–0
4	Bosnia and Herzegovina	12	4	1	7	16	22	−6	13		0–4	3–2	0–2	—	0–1	1–3	1–0
5	Moldova	12	3	3	6	12	19	−7	12 (Note: Tied on head-to-head points (3). Head-to-head goal difference: Moldova +1, Hungary −1.)		0–1	1–1	0–1	2–2	—	3–0	1–1
6	Hungary	12	4	0	8	11	22	−11	12		1–2	0–1	1–4	1–0	2–0	—	2–0
7	Malta	12	1	2	9	10	31	−21	5		0–1	2–2	1–4	2–5	2–3	2–1	—

Source: UEFA
Rules for classification: Qualification tiebreakers

==== Fixtures and results ====
Date	Venue	Opponents	Score	Competition	Norway scorers
25 January	Monster Park, San Francisco (A)	Mexico	1–2; Report	Friendly	Ole Martin Årst
29 January	Home Depot Center, Carson (A)	United States	0–5; Report	Friendly	
1 March	Stade Leopold Senghor, Dakar (A)	Senegal	1–2; Report	Friendly	Erik Hagen
24 May	Ullevaal Stadion, Oslo (H)	Paraguay	2–2; Report	Friendly	Frode Johnsen (2)
1 June	Ullevaal Stadion, Oslo (H)	South Korea	0–0; Report	Friendly	
16 August	Ullevaal Stadion, Oslo (H)	Brazil	1–1; Report	Friendly	Morten Gamst Pedersen
2 September	Szusza Ferenc Stadium, Budapest (A)	Hungary	4–1; Report	Euro Qualifier	Ole Gunnar Solskjær (2); Fredrik Strømstad; Morten Gamst Pedersen
6 September	Ullevaal Stadion, Oslo (H)	Moldova	2–0; Report	Euro Qualifier	Fredrik Strømstad; Steffen Iversen
7 October	Karaiskakis Stadium, Athens (A)	Greece	0–1; Report	Euro Qualifier	
15 November	Stadion Crvena Zvezda, Belgrade (A)	Serbia	1–1; Report	Friendly	John Carew

Key

- H = Home match
- A = Away match
- N = Neutral site match
