= 2006–07 UEFA Women's Cup knockout phase =

Tournament details
- Dates: 11 October 2006 – 29 April 2007
- Teams: 8

The 2006–07 UEFA Women's Cup knockout phase began on 11 October 2006 and concluded on 21 and 29 April 2007 with the two legged tie at the Gammliavallen in Umeå, Sweden and Meadow Park in Borehamwood, England to decide the champions of the 2006–07 UEFA Women's Cup. A total of 8 teams competed in the knockout phase.

== Bracket ==
Quarter-finals
(Norway) Kolbotn (a)	2	2	4
(Germany) Frankfurt	1	3	4
(Netherlands) Saestum	1	2	3
(Sweden) Umeå	6	5	11
(Denmark) Brøndby	3	1	4
(Germany) Turbine Potsdam	0	2	2
(Iceland) Breiðablik	0	1	1
(England) Arsenal	5	4	9

Semi-finals
(Norway) Kolbotn	1	0	1
(Sweden) Umeå	5	6	11
(Denmark) Brøndby	2	0	2
(England) Arsenal	2	3	5

Final
(Sweden) Umeå	0	0	0
(England) Arsenal	1	0	1

== Quarter-finals ==
The first legs were played on October 11 and 12 2006, with the second legs on October 18 and 19.

Team 1	Agg.	Team 2	1st leg	2nd leg
Kolbotn (Norway)	4–4 (a)	(Germany) Frankfurt	2–1	2–3
Saestum (Netherlands)	3–11	(Sweden) Umeå	1–6	2–5
Brøndby (Denmark)	4–2	(Germany) Turbine Potsdam	3–0	1–2
Breiðablik (Iceland)	1–9	(England) Arsenal	0–5	1–4

11 October 2006
16:00 (CET)

Kolbotn (Norway)	2–1	(Germany) Frankfurt
Gulbrandsen 48', 51'	Report	Smisek 74'

Sofiemyr, Oslo
Attendance: 326
Referee: Claudine Brohet (Belgium)
19 October 2006
15:30 (CET)

Frankfurt (Germany)	3–2	(Norway) Kolbotn
Smisek 8', 57'; Wimbersky 49'	Report	Gulbrandsen 66'; Herlovsen 67'

Stadion am Brentanobad, Frankfurt
Attendance: 2,480
Referee: Natalia Avdonchenko (Russia)

4–4 on aggregate. Kolbotn won on away goals.

12 October 2006
19:30 (CET)

Saestum (Netherlands)	1–6	(Sweden) Umeå
Smith 85'	Report	Ljungberg 9', 62', 64'; Marta 43', 63'; Sjöström 69'

Sportpark Noordweg, Zeist
Attendance: 1,129
Referee: Cristina Dorcioman (Romania)
19 October 2006
20:00 (CET)

Umeå (Sweden)	5–2	(Netherlands) Saestum
Moström 12', 23'; Klaveness 21', 46', 75'	Report	Vermeulen 43'; Frisk 64' (o.g.)

Gammliavallen, Umeå
Attendance: 2,052
Referee: Gyöngyi Gaál (Hungary)

Umeå won 11–3 on aggregate.

11 October 2006
18:00 (CET)

Brøndby (Denmark)	3–0	(Germany) Turbine Potsdam
Sorensen 7'; Kjær Jensen 55'; Nielsen 85'	Report

Brøndby Stadium, Brøndby
Attendance: 697
Referee: Alexandra Ihringova (Slovakia)
18 October 2006
18:00 (CET)

Turbine Potsdam (Germany)	2–1	(Denmark) Brøndby
Hingst 48'; Carlson 90'	Report	Falk 45'

Karl-Liebknecht-Stadion, Potsdam
Attendance: 1,156
Referee: Eva Oedlund (Sweden)

Brøndby won 4–2 on aggregate.

12 October 2006
17:00 (CET)

Breiðablik (Iceland)	0–5	(England) Arsenal
	Report	Smith 32', 67'; Sanderson 70'; Fleeting 75', 79'

Kópavogsvöllur, Kópavogur
Attendance: 642
Referee: Floarea Cristina Ionescu (Romania)
19 October 2006
20:30 (CET)

Arsenal (England)	4–1	(Iceland) Breiðablik
Fleeting 7'; Smith 24'; Carney 85'; Yankey 89'	Report	Bjornsdottir 68'

Meadow Park, Borehamwood
Referee: Jenny Palmqvist (Sweden)

Arsenal won 9–1 on aggregate.

== Semi-finals ==
The first legs were played on November 4, 2006, with the second legs on November 11 and 12.

Team 1	Agg.	Team 2	1st leg	2nd leg
Kolbotn (Norway)	1–11	(Sweden) Umeå	1–5	0–6
Brøndby (Denmark)	2–5	(England) Arsenal	2–2	0–3

4 November 2006
14:00 (CET)

Kolbotn (Norway)	1–5	(Sweden) Umeå
Rønning 35'	Report	Ljungberg 2', 77'; Klaveness 54'; Marta 68', 89'

Sofiemyr, Oslo
Attendance: 762
Referee: Wendy Toms (England)
12 November 2006
14:00 (CET)

Umeå (Sweden)	6–0	(Norway) Kolbotn
Marta 12', 77'; Ljungberg 24', 90+2'; Mäkinen 48'; Moström 55'	Report

Gammliavallen, Umeå
Attendance: 732
Referee: Nicole Petignat (Switzerland)

Umeå won 11–1 on aggregate.

4 November 2006
13:00 (CET)

Brøndby (Denmark)	2–2	(England) Arsenal
Pape 16'; L. Jensen 59'	Report	Smith 9', 51'

Brøndby Stadium, Brøndby
Referee: Claudine Brohet (Belgium)
11 November 2006
15:00 (CET)

Arsenal (England)	3–0	(Denmark) Brøndby
Yankey 33'; Carney 53'; Fleeting 90'	Report

Meadow Park, Borehamwood
Referee: Natalia Avdonchenko (Russia)

Arsenal won 5–2 on aggregate.

== Final ==
The first leg was played on 21 April 2007, and the second leg was played on 29 April 2007.

Team 1	Agg.	Team 2	1st leg	2nd leg
Umeå (Sweden)	0–1	(England) Arsenal	0–1	0–0

21 April 2007
14:00 (CET)

Umeå (Sweden)	0–1	(England) Arsenal
	Report	Scott 90+1'

Gammliavallen, Umeå
Attendance: 6,265
Referee: Christine Beck (Germany)
29 April 2007
13:00 (CET)

Arsenal (England)	0–0	(Sweden) Umeå
	Report

Meadow Park, Borehamwood
Attendance: 3,467
Referee: Nicole Petignat (Switzerland)

Arsenal won 1–0 on aggregate.

UEFA Women's Cup
2006-07 winners

First title
