= Tekstylnyk stadium (Chernihiv) =

Football stadium in Chernihiv, Ukraine

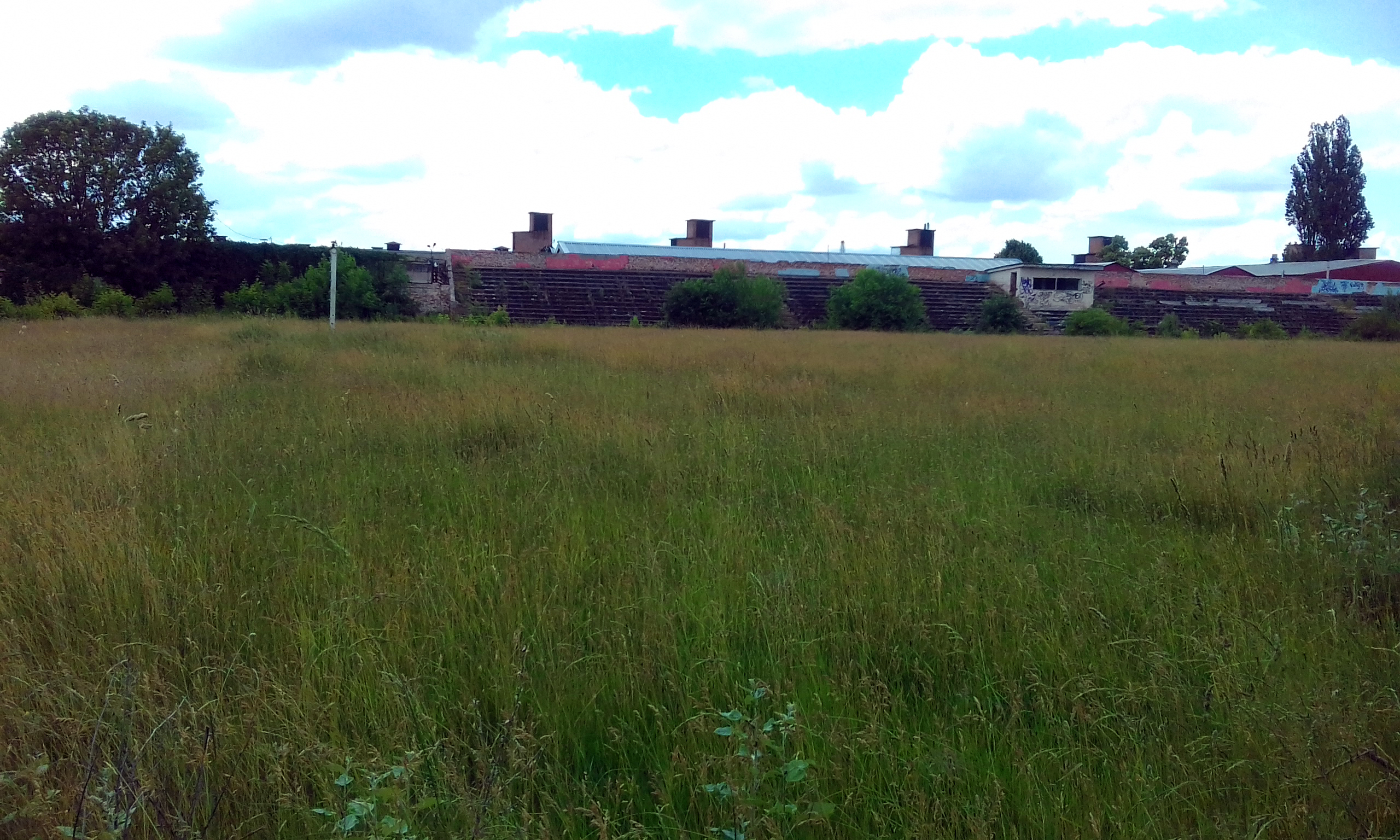
- Interactive map of Tekstylnyk stadium
- Location: vul. Ivana Mazepy, 66, Chernihiv, Ukraine, 16624
- Coordinates: 51°28′10″N 31°16′9″E
- Owner: Cheksil
- Operator: Lehenda Chernihiv (Defunct); Cheksyl Chernihiv (Defunct)
- Capacity: 3000
- Surface: Natural Grass
- Field size: 102×65 meters

Construction
- Opened: 1987

Tenants
- Lehenda Chernihiv From 1987 until 2018; Cheksyl Chernihiv From 1983 until 1997

Tekstylnyk stadium or Cheksil stadium (Ukrainian: Текстильник Cтадіон) is a football stadium in Chernihiv, Ukraine. The stadium was built nearby the Khimik Sports Complex. It was formerly the home arena of the female football club WFC Lehenda-ShVSM Chernihiv. Designed for 2,000 spectators, the field is 102 × 65 m.

== Basic information ==
From 1987 until 2018, it became the home arena of the female football club WFC Lehenda-ShVSM Chernihiv. Despite the fact that Tekstilnik did not meet the UEFA standards, matches of the group stage of the female League of Champions were held at the earliest of the 2010s.

== History ==
=== Origin ===
The stadium was built in 1987 and used by Lehenda Chernihiv. Due to lack of funding, the stadium was in a state of disrepair and it was rebuilt at the zanedbanny camp. Since 2018, no individual plastic seats have been installed on it, and most of the wooden bench seats have been broken. The concrete structures of the stadium are also partially damaged.

=== New tenants ===
The defunct men's football team Cheksyl Chernihiv, who won the Chernihiv Oblast Football Cup as well as the Chernihiv Oblast Football Championship in 1997, used the stadium occasionally.

=== UEFA Women's Cup ===
In 2003, the stadium was brought up to UEFA standards and hosted group stage matches of the Women's Champions League twice in 2003–04 UEFA Women's Cup and 2006–07 UEFA Women's Cup.

=== Russo–Ukrainian war ===
The stadium suffered during the battles for Chernihiv in February–April 2022. In particular, the running tracks of the stadium and the stands were damaged.

== Usage ==
The stadium was used for WFC Lehenda-ShVSM Chernihiv the female teams in Chernihiv. The stadium was used also by the men's football team Cheksyl Chernihiv. In 2012, the stadium, along with the Chernihiv Stadium, Yunist Stadium, and Yunist Stadium, was one of the city's main sports facilities, hosting physical education and sports activities.

== Important matches ==
=== UEFA Women's Cup ===
The stadium was used for some UEFA Women's Cup matches.

Date	Team #1	Result	Team #2	Round	Attendance	Source
21 August 2003	(Ukraine) Lehenda Chernihiv	4–0	(Israel) Maccabi Holon	2003–04 UEFA Women's Cup		
23 August 2003	(Finland) United	0–2	(Ukraine) Lehenda Chernihiv	2003–04 UEFA Women's Cup		
25 August 2003	(Ukraine) Lehenda Chernihiv	0–3	(Sweden) Malmö	2003–04 UEFA Women's Cup		
8 August 2006	(Israel) Maccabi Holon	1–1	(Greece) PAOK	2006–07 UEFA Women's Cup		
10 August 2006	(Cyprus) AEK Kokkinochorion	0–5	(Israel) Maccabi Holon	2006–07 UEFA Women's Cup		
10 August 2006	(Greece) PAOK	5–2	(Cyprus) AEK Kokkinochorion	2006–07 UEFA Women's Cup		

=== Ukrainian Women's Cup ===
The stadium was also used for some Ukrainian Women's Cup matches.

Date	Team #1	Result	Team #2	Round	Attendance	Source
30 June 2016	(Ukraine) Lehenda Chernihiv	7–0	(Ukraine) Ateks Kyiv	2016 Ukrainian Women's Cup	200	

== Gallery ==
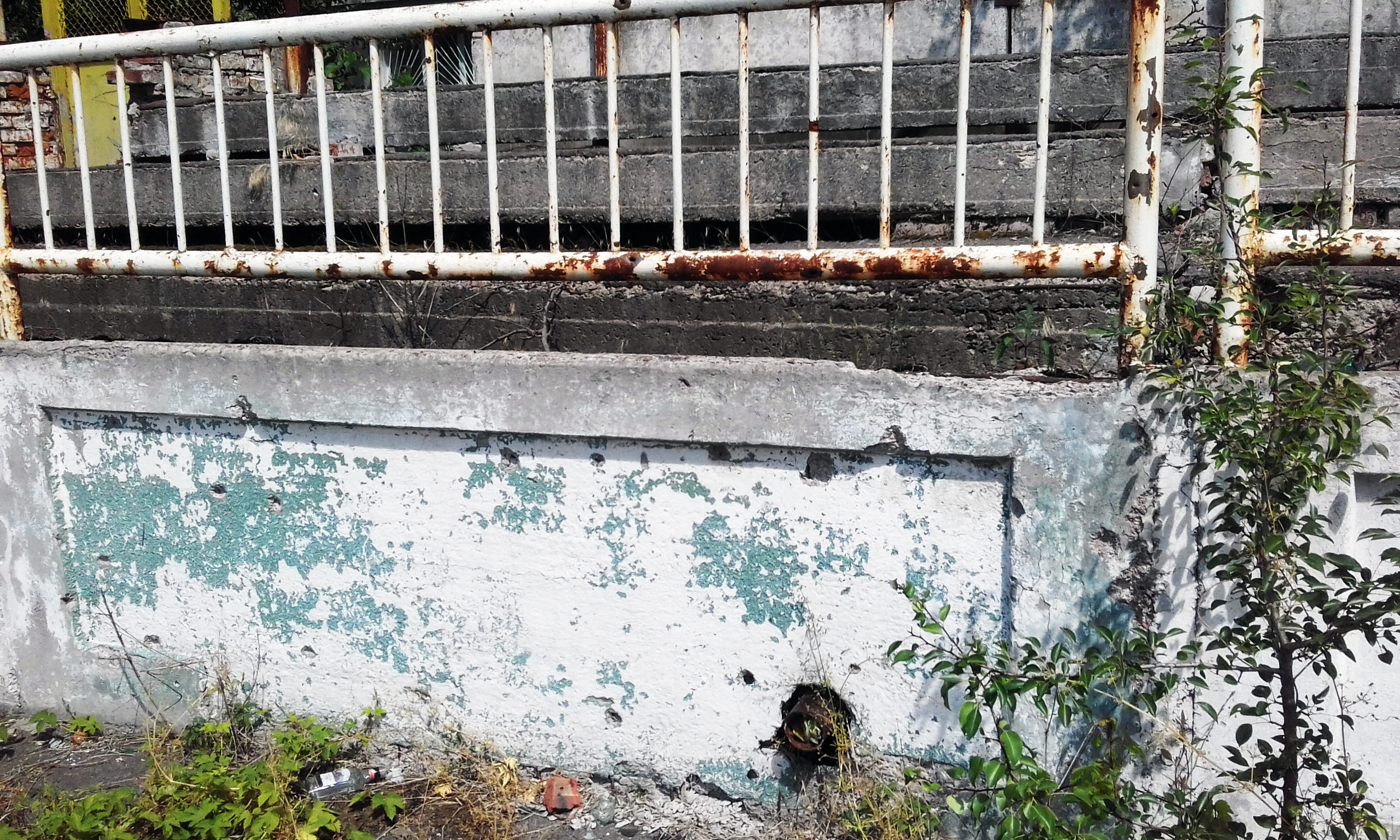
The stands of the Tekstilnyk stadium after Russian shells hit them. Chernihiv

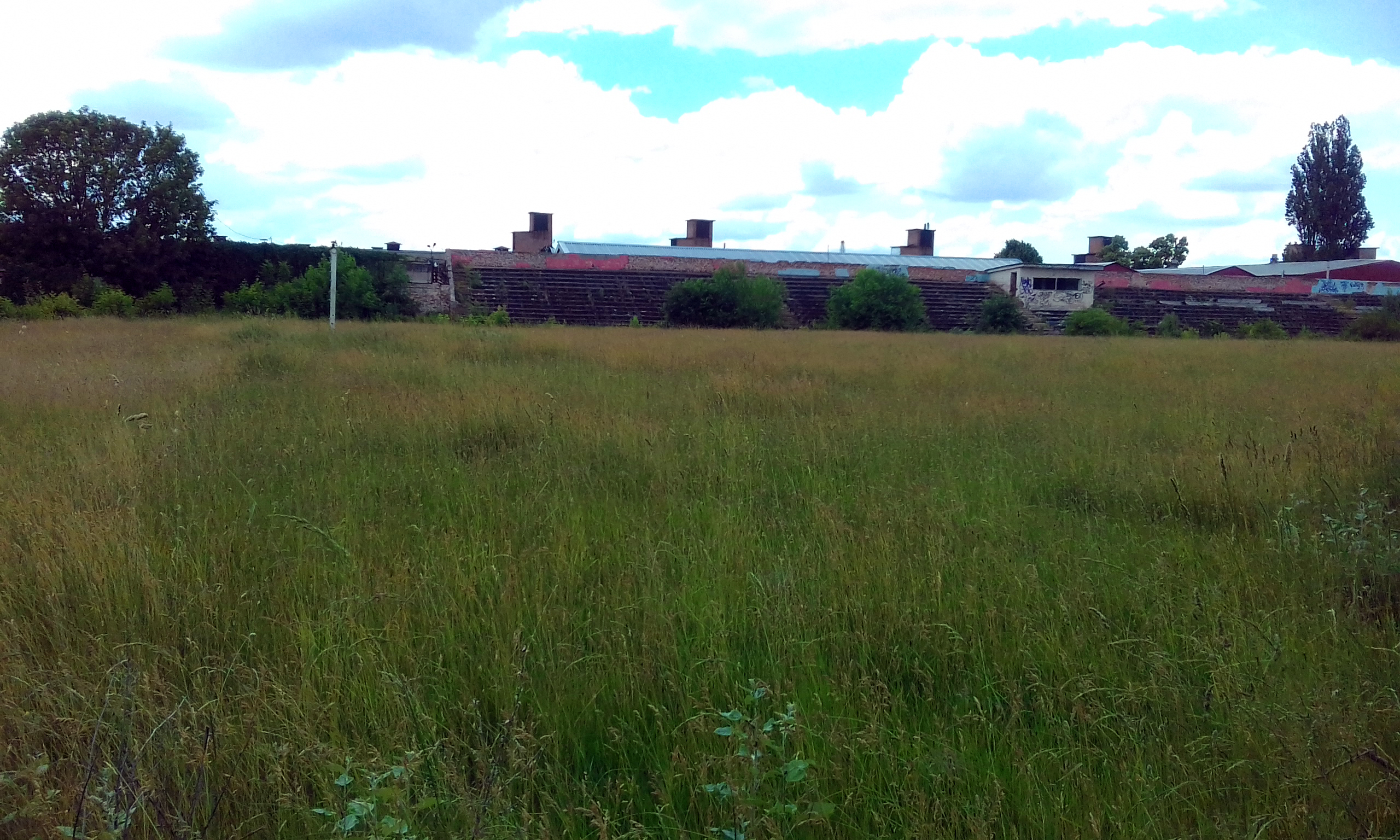
View of the Stadium Tekstilnyk in Chernihiv

== See also ==
- List of sports venues in Chernihiv
- Lehenda Chernihiv
- Cheksyl Chernihiv
