= The Well Spa =

- Location within Norway

General information
- Type: Spa
- Location: Sofiemyr
- Coordinates: 59°47′32″N 10°49′12″E

Website
- https://thewell.no/

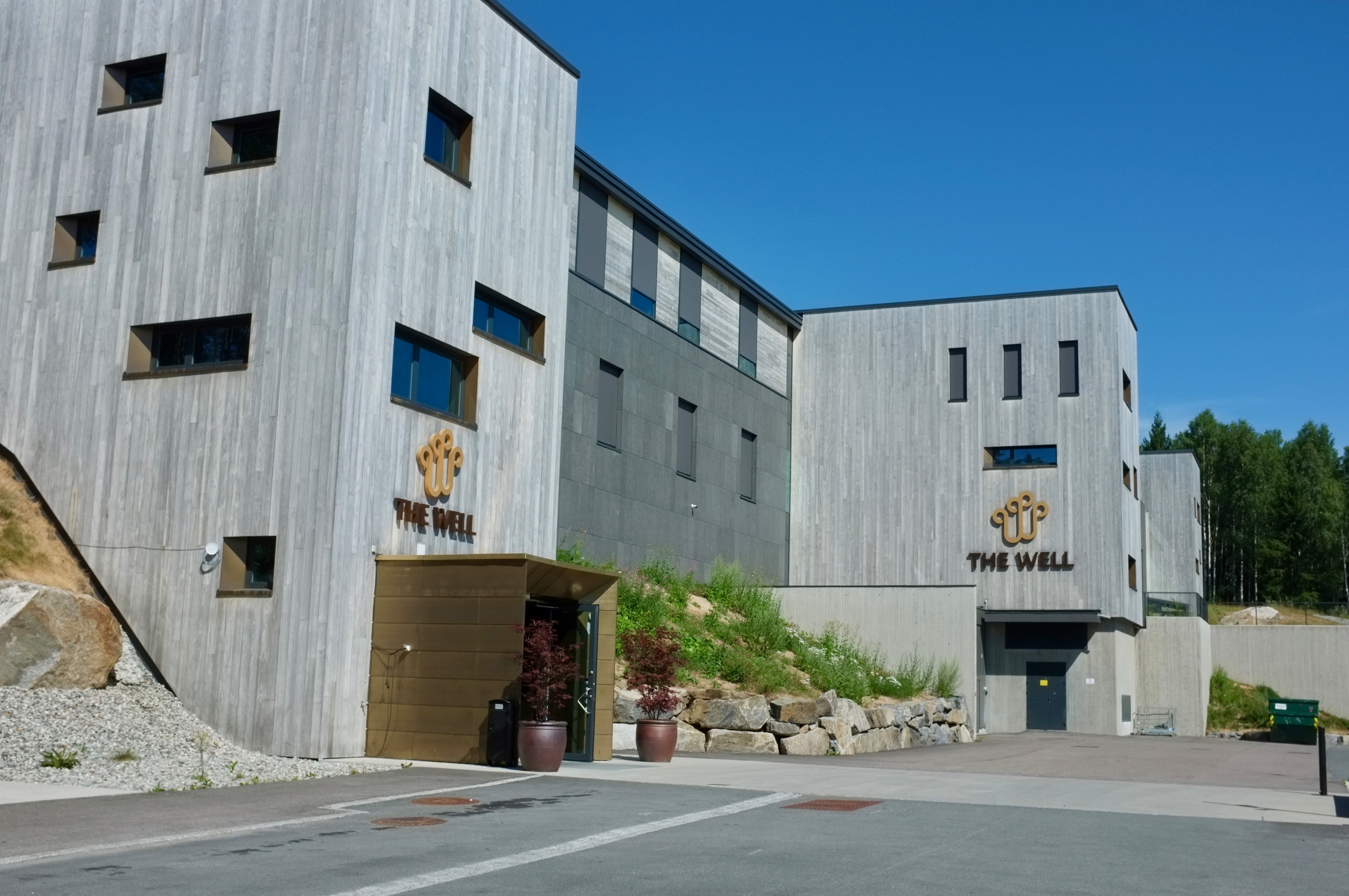
The Well, July 2018.

The Well is an adult-only spa and wellness center at Kolbotn in Oppegård municipality in Akershus county, Norway. Situated 13 kilometers south of downtown Oslo, the center opened in December 2015 with 160 employees. Construction began in January 2014.

The Well is the most expensive spa center ever to be built in Norway. With an original price tag of NOK 150 million, costs had escalated to more than NOK 275 million (US$30 million) by the time the spa and wellness center was completed. The Well is designed by architects Halvorsen & Reine and constructed by entrepreneur Hent.

The Well interior and exterior lighting are designed by ÅF Lighting, Norway.

In November 2016, ÅF Lighting revived the Norwegian lighting award for "best interior lighting", for the interior lighting design of The Well.

The jury presented the award with the following statement: "The lighting concept is based on a metaphor of uneven wavelengths and wave heights where each room and zone has its own identity through lighting design that moves and affects the users in various ways through the facilities. Given the complexity and size of the project they have used an unusual control system with more than 70 diverse luminaires to create great variation through the entire facility. All luminaries are controllable, which is impressive knowing the size and volume of the project".

The Well's stated ambition is to be the premier Nordic spa and wellness center, aiming to attract 100 000 guests annually. The three floor, 10,500 square meter building houses many different regions' spa traditions under one roof, including a full range of outdoor and indoor spa and swimming amenities - such as cave showers, a Turkish hamam, a Japanese garden, a Northern Light Sauna and a Jungle Sauna. There are 15 saunas, 25 treatment rooms, and a total of 11 pools. In accordance with continental spa culture, guests are allowed to use only towels or a peshtemal rather than traditional swim-wear in the pool and sauna areas, though it is possible to wear The Well's own swimwear (in the pools, not in the saunas, except on Tuesdays, when swimwear is optional in the saunas). The Well can seat 250 guests in its restaurant and large outdoor serving area.

The Well saw several name changes before opening. Originally launched as "Aqua Vitae Spa og Badehus", it later changed its name to Aquarius before settling on its present name.

The Well is fully held by Kongeveien Eiendom AS, and is operated and rented by Kongeveien Drift. Both companies are fully held by Canica AS.
