= Cheksil =

Ukrainian textile company

KSK Cheksil
- Interactive map of KSK Cheksil
- Location: vul. Ivana Mazepy, 66, Chernihiv, Ukraine, 16624
- Coordinates: 51°28′10″N 31°15′25″E
- Opened: 1963, Chernihiv
- Owner: Mirko Vangi
- Website: ksk.com.ua

KSK Cheksil (Chernihiv Worsted and Cloth Mill, Chernihivvovna) is one of the largest enterprises in the textile industry in Ukraine, based in Chernihiv. The first stage of the plant was put into operation in 1963. The company is just beside Tekstylschyk stadium and the Chernihiv Ovruch railway.

In 2013, the company's net income amounted to UAH 99.86 million (the level of the previous year), net loss decreased by 45.3% to UAH 8.75 million. “Cheksyl” was awarded a Woolmark international certificate from the International Wool Secretariat based in Düsseldorf for 14 articles of wool-worsted fabrics

In 2020 the company signed a contract to supply textiles to Lithuania for the supply of products to Lithuania for EUR 200,000.

== Company Product ==
- Pure wool worsted fabrics
- wool/polyester fabrics
- Viscose/Polyester fabrics
- 100%Polyester fabrics
- 100% Modacrylic fabrics
- Pure wool woolen fabric
- Carded Wool blend fabrics
