= Stadio Gino Alfonso Sada =

Stadium in Monza, Italy

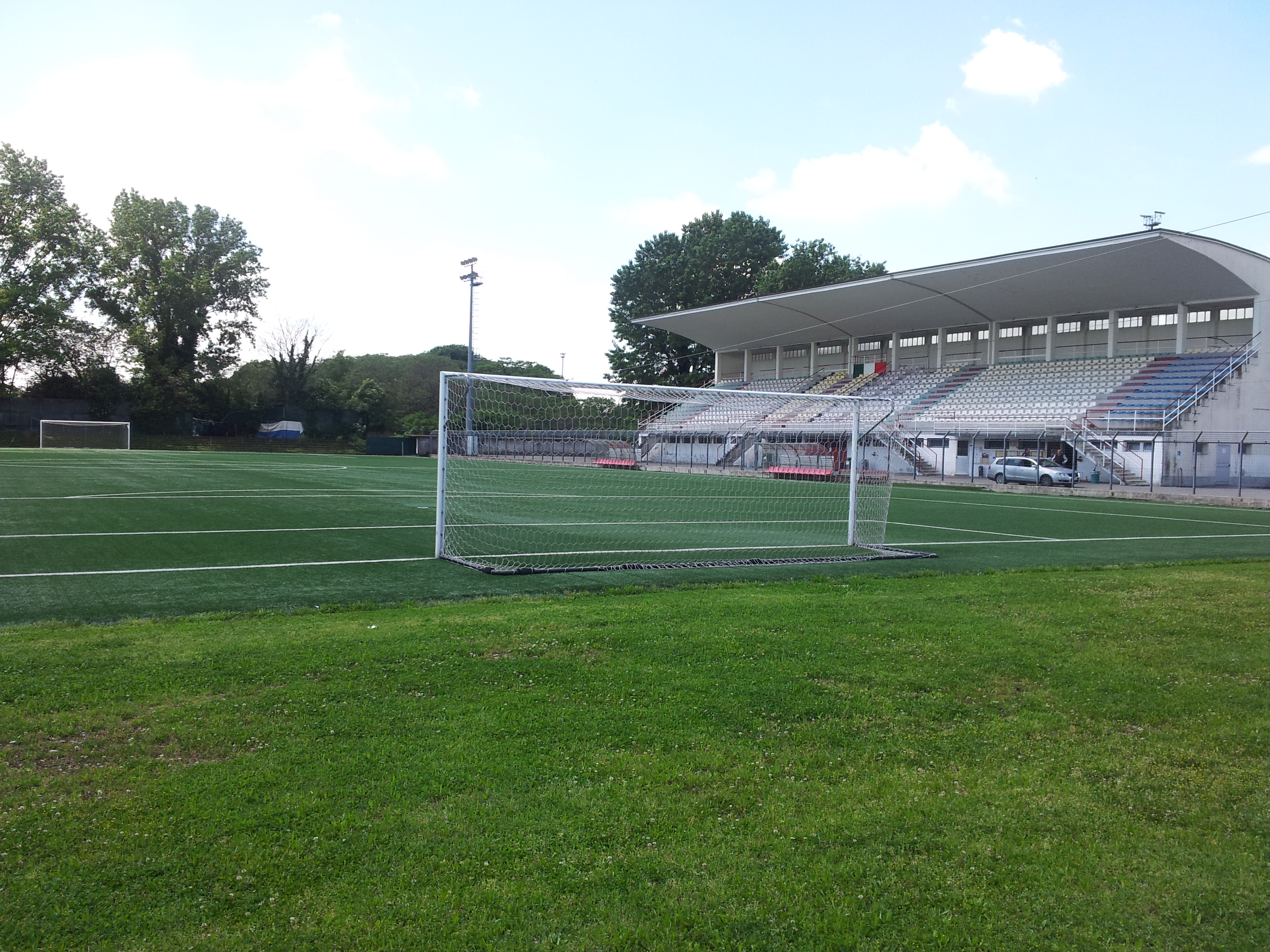
- The stadium in 2013
- Interactive map of Stadio Gino Alfonso Sada
- Former names: San Gregorio (1945–1965); Stadio Città di Monza (1951–1965)
- Address: Via Guarenti, 20900
- Location: Monza, Italy
- Coordinates: 45°34′35″N 9°16′27″E
- Owner: Municipality of Monza
- Capacity: 2,000
- Surface: Artificial grass
- Field size: 105 m × 68 m (344 ft × 223 ft)

Construction
- Groundbreaking: 1945
- Opened: 1945

Tenants
- Monza (1945–1988); Fiammamonza; A.S.D. Juvenilia

The Stadio Gino Alfonso Sada is a multi-purpose stadium in Monza, Italy, and the home of Fiammamonza. Mostly used for football matches, the stadium was built in 1945 and has a capacity of 2,000.

== History ==
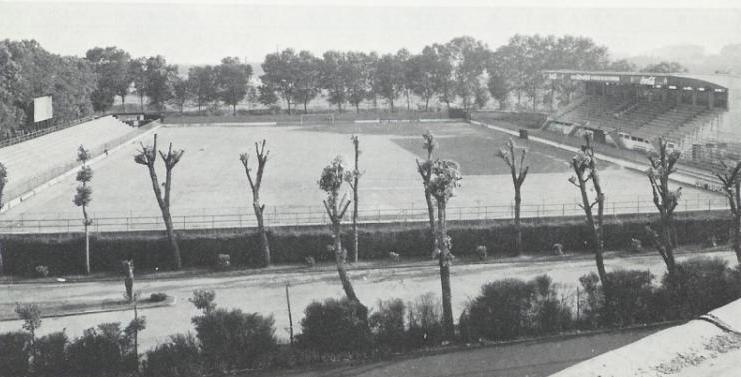
The Stadio Gino Alfonso Sada (1970) hosted Monza's games between 1945 and 1988.

In 1945, following World War II, the "San Gregorio" field was built on the parade ground of the former Gioventù Italiana del Littorio (GIL),. It was inaugurated on 21 October, with Monza's 2–0 friendly win over Pavia. Following Monza's promotion to the Serie B in 1951, a grandstand and stands were built, and the stadium was promptly renamed "Stadio Città di Monza"; the supporters, however, continued calling it with its traditional name.

In 1965, the stadium was renamed "Stadio Gino Alfonso Sada", in honour of the deceased former president of Monza. The club's last game at the "Sada" was played on 11 June 1988, in the away game of the 1987–88 Coppa Italia Serie C final against Palermo, which Monza won 2–1.

== Bibliography ==
- Camesasca, Enrico (July–August 1962). "sulla "corte" in camicia azzurra nasceva 50 anni fa il calcio monzese". la città di Monza (in Italian). No. 22.
- Rocca, Lino; Vegetti, Giorgio (1977). Bianco su rosso: la storia del calcio monza (in Italian). Monza: Officina Grafica Brasca.
- Dutto, Massimo; Vegetti, Giorgio (1992). 80 anni di Monza (in Italian). Monza: Grafica Sipiel.
