= ASD Fiammamonza 1970 =

Italian football club

Fiammamonza
- Full name: Associazione Sportiva Dilettantistica Fiammamonza 1970
- Nicknames: Biancorosse (White and reds); Fiammette (Small flames)
- Founded: 1970; 56 years ago, as S.S. Fiamma Ceraso
- Ground: Stadio Gino Alfonso Sada
- Capacity: 2,000
- President: Carlo Milva
- Head coach: Danilo Brambilla
- League: Serie C
- 2019–20: Eccellenza, 8th of 14
- Website: www.juveniliafiammamonza.it
Home colours	Away colours

Associazione Sportiva Dilettantistica Fiammamonza 1970, better known as Fiammamonza, is a women's football team based in Monza, Lombardy, Italy. They play their games at the 2,000-capacity Stadio Gino Alfonso Sada.

== History ==
Fiammamonza won the Serie A in 2005–06 and, for a short time (1991–1995), also had a men's team in the Terza Categoria, the only example in Italy of the period. The fiammette represented Italy in the UEFA Women's Cup in 2006–07, failing to progress past the first qualifying stage.

== Honours ==
- Serie A
  - Winners (1): 2005–06
- Supercoppa Italiana
  - Winners (1): 2006
- Serie B
  - Winners (2): 1979, 1999–2000
- Coppa Italia
  - Runners-up (2): 1990–91, 1991–92
- Serie A2
  - Runners-up (1): 2011–12

== European record ==
Season	Competition	Round	Opposition	Result	Scorers
2006–07	UEFA Cup	Qualifying stage	(Bosnia and Herzegovina) Sarajevo	1–0	Gazzoli
2006–07	UEFA Cup	Qualifying stage	(Belarus) Universitet Vitebsk	0–1	
2006–07	UEFA Cup	Qualifying stage	(Lithuania) Gintra Universitetas	3–0	Ramera (2), Balconi

== See also ==
- Category:ASD Fiammamonza 1970 players
