= Leena Puranen =

Finnish footballer (born 1986)

Personal information
- Full name: Leena Puranen Skogman
- Date of birth: 18 October 1986 (age 40)
- Place of birth: Tampere, Finland
- Height: 1.75 m (5 ft 9 in)
- Positions: Forward; winger

Team information
- Current team: Varbergs BoIS

Youth career
- TPV

Senior career*
Years	Team	Apps	(Gls)
- Ilves
- Pietarsaari
2006–2007	HJK		
2008	Örebro	21	(3)
2009–2011	Hammarby	45	(7)
2012–2013	Jitex	41	(2)
2014–2015	Kungsbacka DFF	35	(11)
2017	Valinge IF	14	(2)
- Varbergs BoIS

International career^{‡}
2007–2013	Finland	55	(6)
- * Club domestic league appearances and goals as of 14:23, 31 August 2014 (UTC) ‡ National team caps and goals as of 14:23, 31 August 2014 (UTC)

Leena Puranen Skogman (born 18 October 1986) is a Finnish football forward who plays for Swedish lower division team Varbergs BoIS. In 2012 and 2013 she played for Jitex BK in Sweden's Damallsvenskan. She previously played for FC Ilves, United Pietarsaari and HJK in the Naisten Liiga, and KIF Örebro and Hammarby IF in the Swedish league.

Puranen made her senior Finland women's national football team debut in a 4–0 friendly defeat by the United States in Carson, California, on 25 August 2007. In May 2009 Puranen suffered an anterior cruciate ligament injury, which ruled her out of UEFA Women's Euro 2009 in Finland.

National coach Andrée Jeglertz selected Puranen in Finland's squad for UEFA Women's Euro 2013, but she did not play in any of their three games at the tournament.

When Jitex let several players go for financial reasons after the 2013 season, Puranen moved to Division 1 Kungsbacka DFF. By the mid season break she had scored 16 goals at the lower level.
