= Yulia Kornievets =

Ukrainian footballer

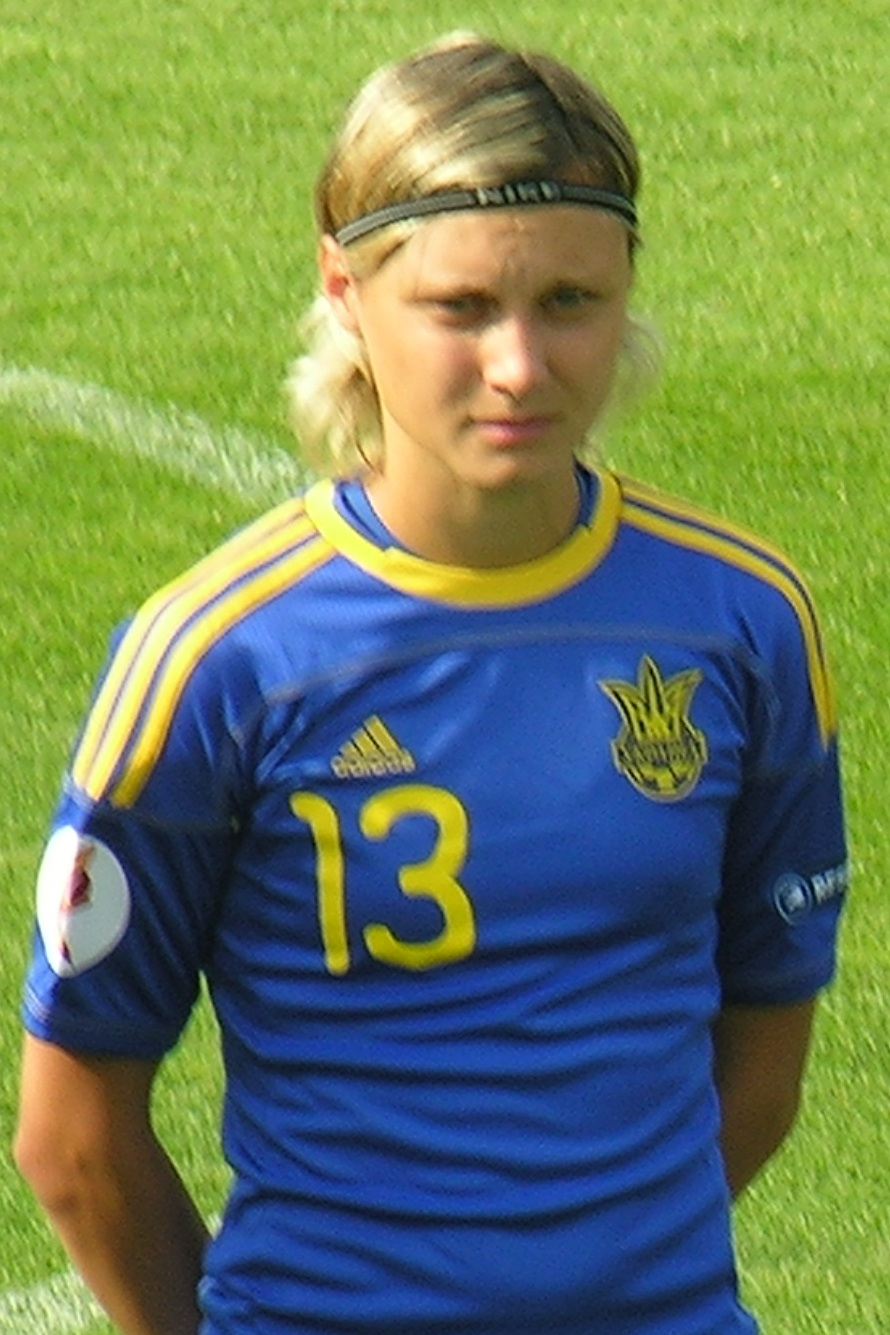

Personal information
- Full name: Yulia Kornievets
- Date of birth: 31 August 1986 (age 40)
- Place of birth: Chernihiv Ukrainian SSR, Soviet Union
- Position: Striker

Senior career*
Years	Team	Apps	(Gls)
2010–2012	Lehenda Chernihiv	113	(126)
2012–2014	Mordovochka Saransk	47	(13)
2015	Zorky Krasnogorsk	6	(0)
2015–2017	Zvezda Perm	18	(5)
2017–2018	Yednist' Plysky	18	(3)
2018–2019	Sporting de Huelva	19	(2)

International career
2010-	Ukraine		
- * Club domestic league appearances and goals

Yulia Kornievets is a Ukrainian footballer who plays as a striker. She previously played in Russia for Zorky Krasnogorsk and Mordovochka Saransk, and in Ukraine for Lehenda Chernihiv, with which she has also played the European Cup. She is a member of the Ukrainian national team.

== Club career ==
Kornievets played in the Spanish Primera División for Sporting de Huelva between 2018 and 2019.
