= Gilanne Louwaars =

Dutch footballer

Personal information
- Full name: Gilanne Louwaars
- Date of birth: 26 May 1979 (age 47)
- Place of birth: Nieuwegein
- Position: Midfielder

Senior career*
Years	Team	Apps	(Gls)
- Saestum
2007–2009	Utrecht		

International career
1997–2006	Netherlands	79	(9)
- * Club domestic league appearances and goals

Gilanne Louwaars is a Dutch former football midfielder who played for SV Saestum in the Hoofdklasse and FC Utrecht in the Eredivisie. She also played the European Cup with Saestum, and she was a member of the Dutch national team. She scored three goals in the 2007 World Cup qualifying including a winner over Austria.

== International goals ==
Scores and results list the Netherlands goal tally first.

Goal	Date	Venue	Opponent	Score	Result	Competition
1.	11 August 2000	Sportpark Berestein, Hilversum, Netherlands	Scotland	2–2	3–2	Friendly
2.	13 August 2001	Fortuna Wormerveer, Wormerveer, Netherlands	Finland	1–1	2–1	Friendly
3.	26 September 2001	Sportpark Bentinckspark, Hoogeveen, Netherlands	France	1–3	1–3	Friendly
4.	10 March 2004	Sportpark Kikkerpolder, Leiden, Netherlands	Republic of Ireland	4–0	6–0	Friendly
5.	12 October 2005	Oosterenkstadion, Zwolle, Netherlands	Switzerland	1–0	6–0	Friendly
6.	29 October 2005	Franz Fekete Stadium, Kapfenberg, Austria	Austria	1–0	1–0	2007 FIFA Women's World Cup qualification
7.	5 February 2006	Estadio Municipal de Maspalomas, Maspalomas, Spain	Finland	1–0	1–0	Friendly
8.	25 March 2006	Andráshida, Zalaegerszeg, Hungary	Hungary	1–0	5–0	2007 FIFA Women's World Cup qualification
9.	25 March 2006	Andráshida, Zalaegerszeg, Hungary	Hungary	5–0	5–0	2007 FIFA Women's World Cup qualification
