= Greta Mjöll Samúelsdóttir =

Icelandic singer and footballer

Personal information
- Full name: Greta Mjöll Samúelsdóttir
- Date of birth: 5 September 1987 (age 39)
- Place of birth: Reykjavík, Iceland
- Position: Midfielder

Youth career
- Breiðablik

Senior career*
| Years | Team | Apps | (Gls) |
| 2003–2013 | Breiðablik | 108 | (56) |

International career
| 2002–2004 | Iceland U-17 | 13 | (5) |
| 2003–2006 | Iceland U-19 | 14 | (14) |
| 2005–2006 | Iceland U-21 | 7 | (1) |
| 2005–2012 | Iceland | 28 | (3) |
- * Club domestic league appearances and goals

Greta Mjöll Samúelsdóttir (born 5 September 1987) is an Icelandic singer and a retired international footballer. Greta represented Breiðablik in the Úrvalsdeild her entire career, excepting university stints in the United States.

== Sports career ==
Club

She played with Breiðablik her entire senior career, but had many stints playing at university level in the USA while she studied there. She won the league with Breiðablik in 2005 and the Icelandic Women's Cup in 2005 and 2013. She was forced to retire after the 2013 season due to a persisting knee injury.

International

Greta played 28 games and scored three goals for Iceland during her career.

International performance

Iceland national team
| Year | Apps | Goals |
|---|---|---|
| 2005 | 1 | 0 |
| 2006 | 8 | 1 |
| 2007 | 7 | 2 |
| 2008 | 5 | 0 |
| 2011 | 3 | 0 |
| 2012 | 4 | 0 |
| Total | 28 | 3 |

International goals

| # | Date | Location | Opponent | Score | Result | Competition |
|---|---|---|---|---|---|---|
| 1. | June 18, 2006 | Reykjavík, Iceland | Portugal | 2–0 | 3–0 | 2007 Fifa World Cup Qual. |
| 2. | March 14, 2007 | Albufeira, Portugal | Chile | 2–0 | 4–1 | 2007 Algarve Cup |
| 3. | May 31, 2007 | Kaisariani, Greece | Greece | 3–0 | 3–0 | UEFA Euro 2009 Qual. |

Honours

- Icelandic champion: 2005
- Icelandic Women's Cup: 2005, 2013

== Music career ==
Greta Mjöll participated in Söngvakeppnin, the Icelandic qualifiers for the Eurovision Song Contest 2014, performing the song "Eftir eitt lag". She managed to proceed from the semi-finals to the finals, held on 15 February 2014. She did not qualify to the superfinal.

== Discography ==
=== Singles ===
- 2014: "Eftir eitt lag"
