= Heidi Ahonen =

Finnish footballer (born 1984)

Personal information
- Date of birth: 25 March 1984 (age 42)
- Place of birth: Kerava, Finland
- Position: Midfielder

International career
Years	Team	Apps	(Gls)
	Finland	13	(0)

Heidi Ahonen (born 25 March 1984) is a retired Finnish footballer. Ahonen was capped 13 times for Finland.

== International career ==
Ahonen was also part of the Finnish team at the 2005 European Championships.
