= Erna Björk Sigurðardóttir =

Icelandic footballer

Erna B. Sigurðardóttir
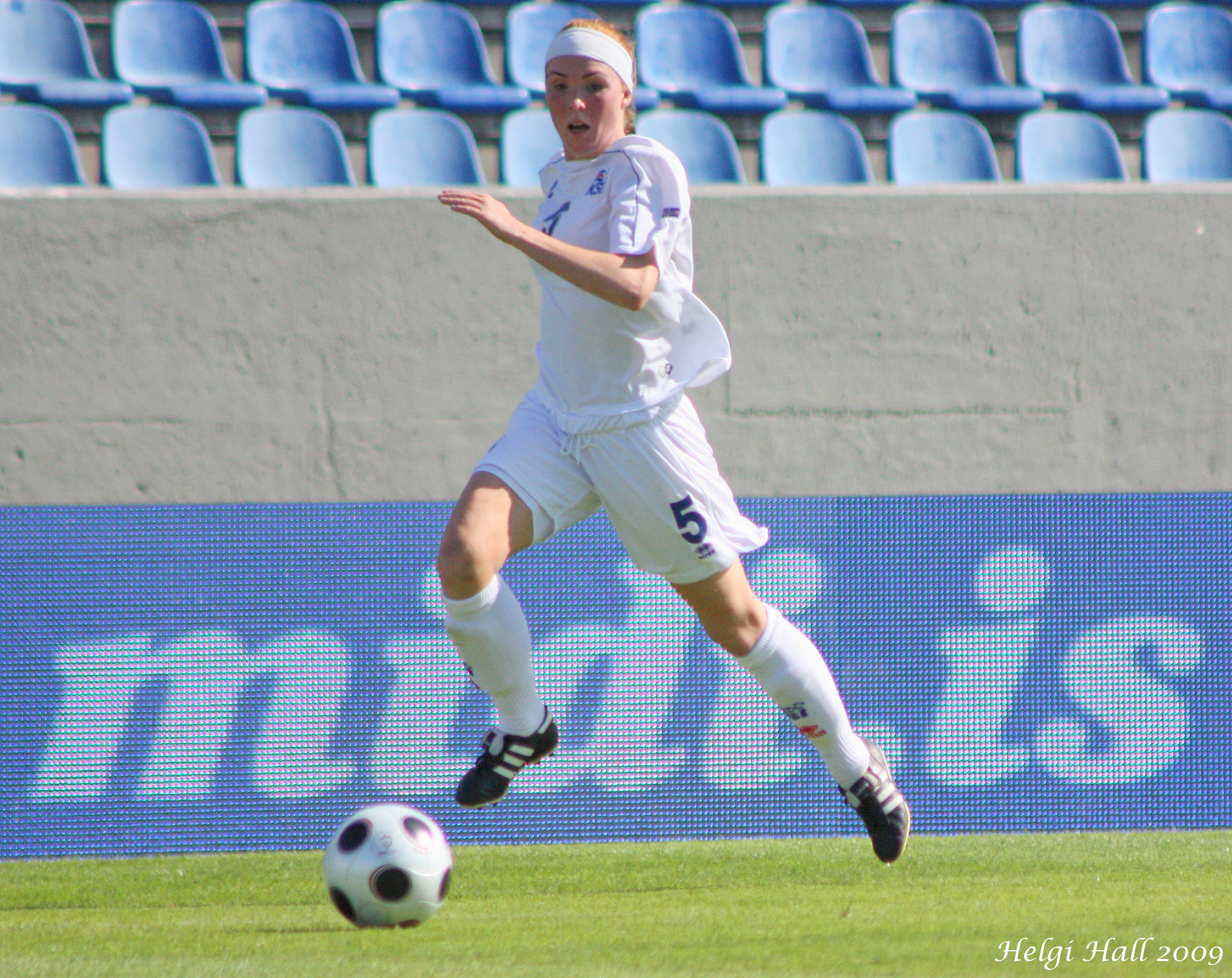
- Erna playing for Iceland in 2009

Personal information
- Full name: Erna Björk Sigurðardóttir
- Date of birth: 30 December 1982 (age 43)
- Place of birth: Iceland
- Position: Defender

Senior career*
Years	Team	Apps	(Gls)
1998–2009	Breiðablik	135	(51)

International career^{‡}
1998–1999	Iceland U-17	8	(0)
1999–2000	Iceland U-19	8	(3)
2000–2004	Iceland U-21	14	(2)
2003–2010	Iceland	36	(0)
- * Club domestic league appearances and goals as of 27 September 2009 ‡ National team caps and goals as of 3 March 2010

Erna Björk Sigurðardóttir (born 30 December 1982) is an Icelandic former footballer who played as a defender. She was part of Iceland's national team and competed in UEFA Women's Euro 2009. Erna captained Breiðablik. She retired after the 2009 season but her last match was with the national team against Portugal in the 2010 Algarve Cup.

== Achievements ==
- Three times Icelandic champion with Breiðablik, 2000, 2001 and 2005.
- Three times Icelandic cup winner with Breiðablik, 1998, 2000 and 2005.

== Honours ==
- Chosen Player of the Year in Breiðablik in 2003 and 2006.
