= Sofiemyr =

- Village
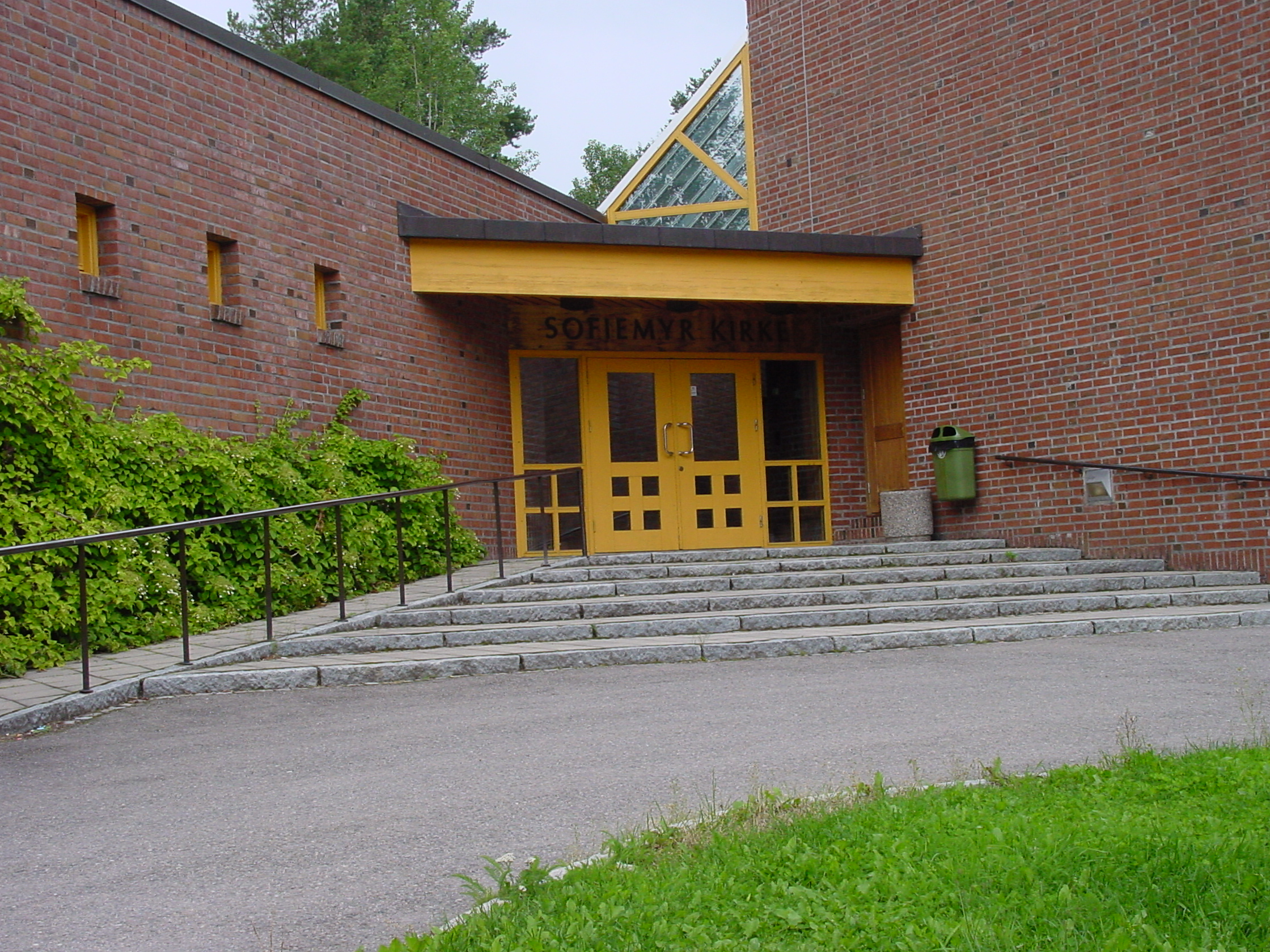
- The main entrance to the church of sofiemyr

- Location in Akershus
- Coordinates: 59°47′50″N 10°49′02″E
- Country: Norway
- Region: Østlandet
- County: Akershus
- District: Follo
- Municipality: Nordre Follo
- Time zone: UTC+01:00 (CET)
  - Summer (DST): UTC+02:00 (CEST)
- Post Code: NO-1412

Sofiemyr is a village located in Nordre Follo, Akershus, Norway.

The Well Spa is located in the village.
