= 2006–07 UEFA Women's Cup =

Tournament details
- Dates: 8 August 2006 – 29 April 2007
- Teams: 43

Final positions
- Champions: (England) Arsenal (1st title)
- Runners-up: (Sweden) Umeå

Tournament statistics
- Top scorer(s): (Scotland) Julie Fleeting; 9 goals

The UEFA Women's Cup 2006–07 was the sixth edition of the UEFA Women's Cup football club tournament (since rebranded as the UEFA Women's Champions League). 43 teams from 42 football associations took part, starting with the first qualifying round played on 8 and 18 August 2006. The tournament ended with Arsenal of England emerging out as the winners in the final after a 1–0 aggregate win over Umeå of Sweden; this was the first time a British club had claimed the trophy and the last until Arsenal won again in 2025.

== Teams ==
Second qualifying round
(Germany) Frankfurt (TH)	(Germany) Turbine Potsdam (CH)	(England) Arsenal (CH)	(Sweden) Umeå (CH)
(Denmark) Brøndby (CH)	(Norway) Kolbotn (CH)	(Czech Republic) Sparta Praha (CH)	
First qualifying round
(Spain) Espanyol (CH)	(Iceland) Breiðablik (CH)	(Belgium) Rapide Wezemaal (CH)	(Russia) Rossiyanka (CH)
(Austria) Neulengbach (CH)	(France) Juvisy (CH)	(Kazakhstan) Alma (CH)	(Belarus) Universitet Vitebsk (CH)
(Switzerland) Zuchwil (CH)	(Italy) Fiammamonza (CH)	(Israel) Maccabi Holon (CH)	(Netherlands) Saestum (CH)
(Bosnia and Herzegovina) ZNK-SFK 2000 (CH)	(Hungary) Femina (CH)	(Poland) AZS Wrocław (CH)	(Portugal) 1° Dezembro (CH)
(Bulgaria) NSA Sofia (CH)	(Ukraine) Lehenda (CH)	(Scotland) Hibernian Ladies (CH)	(Wales) Cardiff City (CW)
(Greece) PAOK (CH)	(Lithuania) Gintra Universitetas (CH)	(Slovenia) Pomurje (CH)	(Romania) CFF Clujana (CH)
(Finland) HJK (CH)	(Slovakia) Slovan Duslo Sala (CH)	(Serbia) Mašinac Classic Niš (CH)	(Moldova) Narta Chişinău (CH)
(Faroe Islands) KÍ Klaksvík (CH)	(North Macedonia) Skiponjat (CH)	(Azerbaijan) Gömrükçü Baku (CH)	(Republic of Ireland) Dundalk (CW)
(Croatia) Maksimir (CH)	(Estonia) Pärnu JK (CH)	(Northern Ireland) Newtownabbey Strikers (CH)	(Cyprus) AEK Kokkinochorion (CH)

== Qualifying round ==
=== First qualifying round ===
==== Group A1 ====
Pos	Team	Pld	W	D	L	GF	GA	GD	Pts	Qualification	SAE	CAR	MAK	DUN
1	(Netherlands) Saestum	3	3	0	0	15	1	+14	9	Advance to second qualifying round	—	–	7–0	6–1
2	(Wales) Cardiff City	3	2	0	1	5	4	+1	6		0–2	—	–	2–0
3	(Croatia) Maksimir (H)	3	1	0	2	10	10	0	3		–	2–3	—	–
4	(Republic of Ireland) Dundalk	3	0	0	3	1	16	−15	0		–	–	0–8	—

Source: RSSSF
(H) Hosts

==== Group A2 ====
Pos	Team	Pld	W	D	L	GF	GA	GD	Pts	Qualification	ESP	JUV	HIB	KIK
1	(Spain) Espanyol	3	3	0	0	12	1	+11	9	Advance to second qualifying round	—	–	–	7–0
2	(France) Juvisy	3	2	0	1	12	1	+11	6		0–1	—	–	6–0
3	(Scotland) Hibernian (H)	3	1	0	2	3	11	−8	3		1–4	0–6	—	–
4	(Faroe Islands) KÍ Klaksvík	3	0	0	3	1	15	−14	0		–	–	1–2	—

Source: RSSSF
(H) Hosts

==== Group A3 ====
Pos	Team	Pld	W	D	L	GF	GA	GD	Pts	Qualification	BRE	NEU	DEZ	NEW
1	(Iceland) Breiðablik	3	3	0	0	14	0	+14	9	Advance to second qualifying round	—	–	–	7–0
2	(Austria) Neulengbach (H)	3	2	0	1	8	4	+4	6		0–3	—	–	5–1
3	(Portugal) 1.º de Dezembro	3	1	0	2	7	8	−1	3		0–4	0–3	—	–
4	(Northern Ireland) Newtownabbey Strikers	3	0	0	3	2	19	−17	0		–	–	1–7	—

Source: RSSSF
(H) Hosts

==== Group A4 ====
Pos	Team	Pld	W	D	L	GF	GA	GD	Pts	Qualification	HJK	WRO	ZUC	SKI
1	(Finland) HJK	3	3	0	0	10	0	+10	9	Advance to second qualifying round	—	–	–	7–0
2	(Poland) AZS Wrocław	3	1	1	1	6	4	+2	4		0–1	—	–	4–1
3	(Switzerland) Zuchwil	3	1	1	1	5	5	0	4		0–2	2–2	—	–
4	(North Macedonia) Skiponjat (H)	3	0	0	3	2	14	−12	0		–	–	1–3	—

Source: RSSSF
(H) Hosts

==== Group A5 ====
Pos	Team	Pld	W	D	L	GF	GA	GD	Pts	Qualification	UVI	FIA	SAR	GUN
1	(Belarus) Universitet Vitebsk	3	2	0	1	2	1	+1	6	Advance to second qualifying round	—	1–0	–	1–0
2	(Italy) Fiammamonza	3	2	0	1	4	1	+3	6		–	—	–	3–0
3	(Bosnia and Herzegovina) SFK Sarajevo	3	1	1	1	2	2	0	4		1–0	0–1	—	–
4	(Lithuania) Gintra-Universitetas (H)	3	0	1	2	1	5	−4	1		–	–	1–1	—

Source: RSSSF
(H) Hosts

==== Group A6 ====
Pos	Team	Pld	W	D	L	GF	GA	GD	Pts	Qualification	WEZ	MCN	POM	PAR
1	(Belgium) Rapide Wezemaal	3	3	0	0	18	1	+17	9	Advance to second qualifying round	—	6–1	5–0	–
2	(Serbia) Mašinac Classic Niš	3	2	0	1	10	9	+1	6		–	—	3–2	6–1
3	(Slovenia) Pomurje (H)	3	1	0	2	9	9	0	3		–	–	—	7–1
4	(Estonia) Pärnu JK	3	0	0	3	2	20	−18	0		0–7	–	–	—

Source: RSSSF
(H) Hosts

==== Group A7 ====
Pos	Team	Pld	W	D	L	GF	GA	GD	Pts	Qualification	ROS	ALM	SDŠ	CLU
1	(Russia) Rossiyanka	3	3	0	0	18	3	+15	9	Advance to second qualifying round	—	–	–	7–0
2	(Kazakhstan) Alma	3	2	0	1	11	9	+2	6		2–5	—	5–2	–
3	(Slovakia) Slovan Šaľa (H)	3	1	0	2	4	11	−7	3		1–6	–	—	–
4	(Romania) Clujana Cluj-Napoca	3	0	0	3	2	12	−10	0		–	2–4	0–1	—

Source: RSSSF
(H) Hosts

==== Group A8 ====
Pos	Team	Pld	W	D	L	GF	GA	GD	Pts	Qualification	LCH	MHO	PAOK	KOK
1	(Ukraine) Lehenda (H)	3	3	0	0	12	0	+12	9	Advance to second qualifying round	—	–	5–0	4–0
2	(Israel) Maccabi Holon	3	1	1	1	6	4	+2	4		0–3	—	1–1	–
3	(Greece) PAOK	3	1	1	1	6	8	−2	4		–	–	—	5–2
4	(Cyprus) AEK Kokkinochorion	3	0	0	3	2	14	−12	0		–	0–5	–	—

Source: RSSSF
(H) Hosts

==== Group A9 ====
Pos	Team	Pld	W	D	L	GF	GA	GD	Pts	Qualification	FEM	NSA	NCH	GBA
1	(Hungary) Femina	3	3	0	0	15	1	+14	9	Advance to second qualifying round	—	–	7–0	–
2	(Bulgaria) NSA Sofia (H)	3	2	0	1	10	2	+8	6		0–1	—	–	7–0
3	(Moldova) Narta Chişinău	3	1	0	2	3	11	−8	3		–	1–3	—	–
4	(Azerbaijan) Gömrükçü Baku	3	0	0	3	2	16	−14	0		1–7	–	1–2	—

Source: RSSSF
(H) Hosts

=== Second qualifying round ===
==== Group B1 ====
Pos	Team	Pld	W	D	L	GF	GA	GD	Pts	Qualification	FRA	BRE	HJK	UVI
1	(Germany) Frankfurt	3	3	0	0	12	0	+12	9	Advance to quarter-finals	—	5–0	–	5–0
2	(Iceland) Breiðablik	3	2	0	1	3	6	−3	6	Advance to quarter-finals	–	—	–	1–0
3	(Finland) HJK (H)	3	0	1	2	1	4	−3	1		0–2	1–2	—	–
4	(Belarus) Universitet Vitebsk	3	0	1	2	0	6	−6	1		–	–	0–0	—

Source: RSSSF
(H) Hosts

==== Group B2 ====
Pos	Team	Pld	W	D	L	GF	GA	GD	Pts	Qualification	UME	KOL	ESP	LCH
1	(Sweden) Umeå	3	3	0	0	7	1	+6	9	Advance to quarter-finals	—	–	3–0	2–0
2	(Norway) Kolbotn (H)	3	2	0	1	7	5	+2	6	Advance to quarter-finals	1–2	—	4–2	–
3	(Spain) Espanyol	3	1	0	2	7	7	0	3		–	–	—	5–0
4	(Ukraine) Lehenda	3	0	0	3	1	9	−8	0		–	1–2	–	—

Source: RSSSF
(H) Hosts

==== Group B3 ====
Pos	Team	Pld	W	D	L	GF	GA	GD	Pts	Qualification	TPO	SAE	WEZ	SPR
1	(Germany) Turbine Potsdam	3	2	1	0	7	2	+5	7	Advance to quarter-finals	—	2–2	1–0	–
2	(Netherlands) Saestum (H)	3	2	1	0	7	3	+4	7	Advance to quarter-finals	–	—	2–0	–
3	(Belgium) Rapide Wezemaal	3	1	0	2	4	5	−1	3		–	–	—	4–2
4	(Czech Republic) Sparta Prague	3	0	0	3	3	11	−8	0		0–4	1–3	–	—

Source: RSSSF
(H) Hosts

==== Group B4 ====
Pos	Team	Pld	W	D	L	GF	GA	GD	Pts	Qualification	ARS	BRØ	ROS	FEM
1	(England) Arsenal	3	3	0	0	12	4	+8	9	Advance to quarter-finals	—	1–0	5–4	–
2	(Denmark) Brøndby	3	2	0	1	7	3	+4	6	Advance to quarter-finals	–	—	2–1	5–1
3	(Russia) Rossiyanka (H)	3	1	0	2	9	9	0	3		–	–	—	4–2
4	(Hungary) Femina	3	0	0	3	3	15	−12	0		0–6	–	–	—

Source: RSSSF
(H) Hosts

== Knockout phase ==
=== Bracket ===
Quarter-finals
(Norway) Kolbotn (a)	2	2	4
(Germany) Frankfurt	1	3	4
(Netherlands) Saestum	1	2	3
(Sweden) Umeå	6	5	11
(Denmark) Brøndby	3	1	4
(Germany) Turbine Potsdam	0	2	2
(Iceland) Breiðablik	0	1	1
(England) Arsenal	5	4	9

Semi-finals
(Norway) Kolbotn	1	0	1
(Sweden) Umeå	5	6	11
(Denmark) Brøndby	2	0	2
(England) Arsenal	2	3	5

Final
(Sweden) Umeå	0	0	0
(England) Arsenal	1	0	1

=== Quarter-finals ===
The first legs were played on October 11 and 12 2006, with the second legs on October 18 and 19.

Team 1	Agg.	Team 2	1st leg	2nd leg
Kolbotn (Norway)	4–4 (a)	(Germany) Frankfurt	2–1	2–3
Saestum (Netherlands)	3–11	(Sweden) Umeå	1–6	2–5
Brøndby (Denmark)	4–2	(Germany) Turbine Potsdam	3–0	1–2
Breiðablik (Iceland)	1–9	(England) Arsenal	0–5	1–4

=== Semi-finals ===
The first legs were played on November 4, 2006, with the second legs on November 11 and 12.

Team 1	Agg.	Team 2	1st leg	2nd leg
Kolbotn (Norway)	1–11	(Sweden) Umeå	1–5	0–6
Brøndby (Denmark)	2–5	(England) Arsenal	2–2	0–3

=== Final ===
The first leg was played on 21 April 2007, and the second leg was played on 29 April 2007.

Team 1	Agg.	Team 2	1st leg	2nd leg
Umeå (Sweden)	0–1	(England) Arsenal	0–1	0–0

21 April 2007
14:00 (CET)

Umeå (Sweden)	0–1	(England) Arsenal
	Report	Scott 90+1'

Gammliavallen, Umeå
Attendance: 6,265
Referee: Christine Beck (Germany)
29 April 2007
13:00 (CET)

Arsenal (England)	0–0	(Sweden) Umeå
	Report

Meadow Park, Borehamwood
Attendance: 3,467
Referee: Nicole Petignat (Switzerland)

Arsenal won 1–0 on aggregate.

UEFA Women's Cup
2006-07 winners

First title

== Top goalscorers ==
(excluding qualifying rounds)

Rank	Player	Team	Goals
1	(Sweden) Hanna Ljungberg	Umeå	7
2	(Brazil) Marta	Umeå	6
3	(England) Kelly Smith	Arsenal	5
