= List of Women's Super League managers =

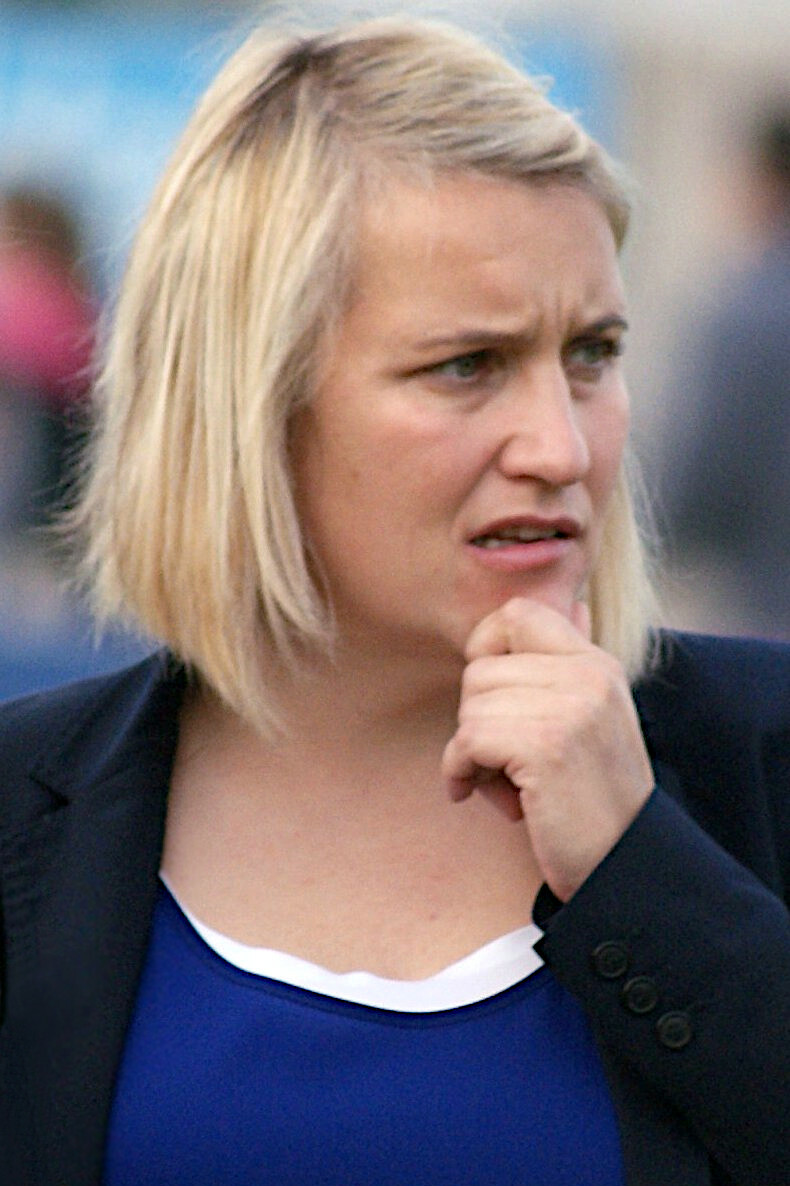
Former Chelsea manager Emma Hayes has managed more WSL games (212) and won more titles (7) than any other manager.

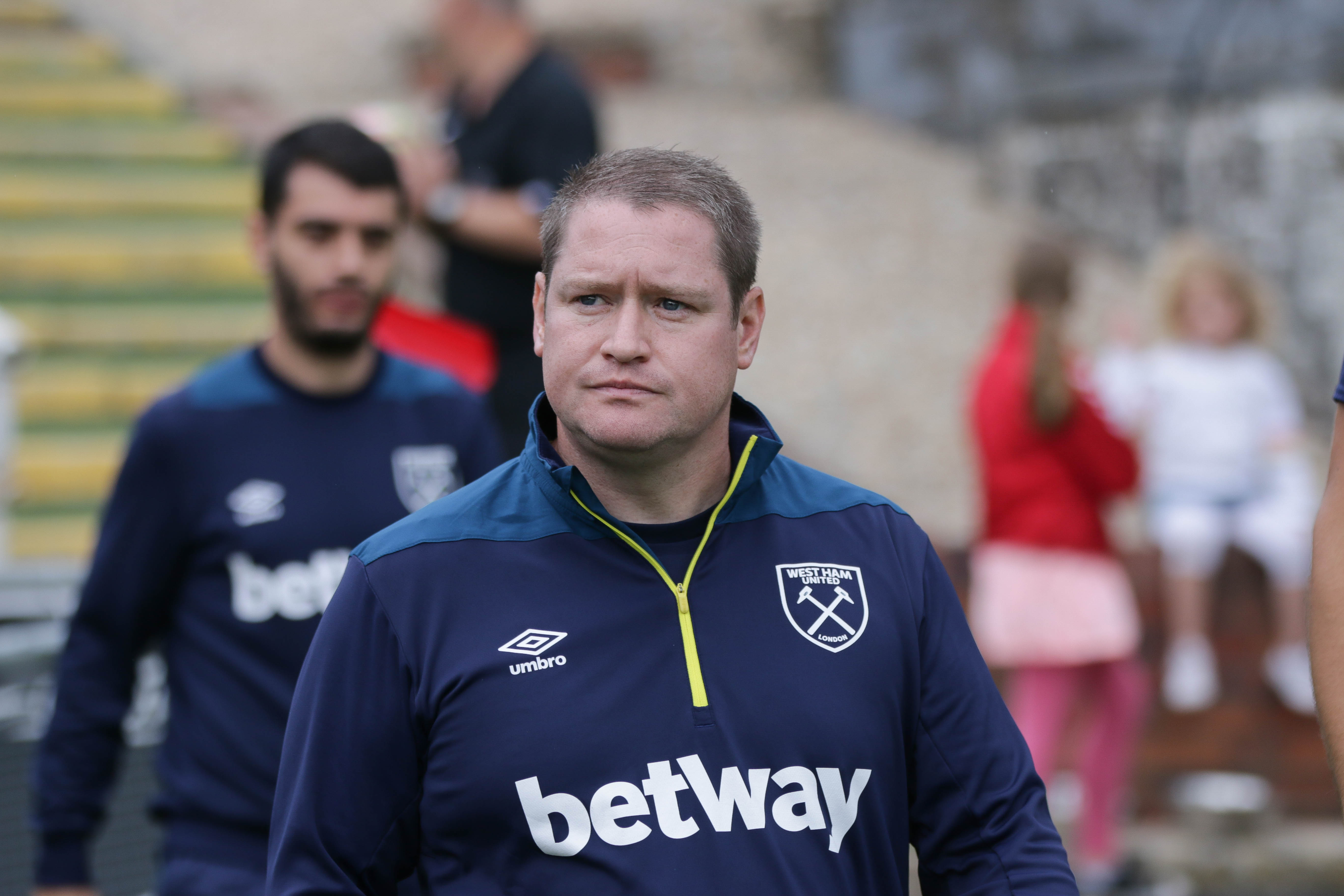
Matt Beard has managed more WSL clubs than any other manager (4).

The Women's Super League is the top tier of women's football in England. The league began in 1998, supplanting the FA Women's Premier League National Division as the highest level of women's football in England.

As of the end of the 2024–25 Women's Super League season, Emma Hayes holds the record for most games managed in the WSL with 212, all with Chelsea, which she managed from 14 August 2012 to 18 May 2024. The most successful manager in the WSL is Emma Hayes, who won seven league titles with Chelsea between 2015 and 2024. Matt Beard has managed the most teams in the WSL, having taken charge of four different clubs: Chelsea, Liverpool, West Ham United and Bristol City across five different spells.

== Current Women's Super League managers ==
| Name | Nationality | Age | Club | Since | Duration |
|---|---|---|---|---|---|
| Karen Hills | England | 51 | Charlton Athletic | 16 March 2021 | 5 years, 225 days |
| Amy Merricks | England | 33 | Birmingham City | 16 April 2024 | 2 years, 194 days |
| Sonia Bompastor | France | 46 | Chelsea | 29 May 2024 | 2 years, 151 days |
| Renée Slegers | Netherlands | 37 | Arsenal | 15 October 2024 | 2 years, 12 days |
| Jo Potter | England | 41 | Crystal Palace | 24 June 2025 | 1 year, 125 days |
| Andrée Jeglertz | Sweden | 54 | Manchester City | 3 July 2025 | 1 year, 116 days |
| Martin Ho | England | 36 | Tottenham Hotspur | 4 July 2025 | 1 year, 115 days |
| Gareth Taylor | Wales | 53 | Liverpool | 8 August 2025 | 1 year, 80 days |
| Rita Guarino | Italy | 55 | West Ham United | 22 December 2025 | 309 days |
| Eder Maestre | Spain | 40 | London City Lionesses | 2 January 2026 | 298 days |
| Scott Phelan | England | 38 | Everton | 4 February 2026 | 265 days |
| Eva Olid | Spain | 41 | Manchester United | 5 August 2026 | 83 days |
| Arturo Ruiz | Spain | 29 | Brighton & Hove Albion | 28 August 2026 | 60 days |
| Brian Sørensen | Denmark | 46 | Aston Villa | 22 January 2025 | 29 days |

== List of all-time managerial appointments ==
The list of managers includes everyone who has managed a club while they were in the WSL, whether in a permanent or temporary role. Interim managers are listed only when they managed the team for at least one match in that period.

Key
| † | Incumbent manager |
| ‡ | Caretaker manager |
| § | Incumbent but no longer in WSL |

| Name | Nationality | Club | From | Until | Duration | Years in League | Ref. |
|---|---|---|---|---|---|---|---|
| Laura Harvey | England | Arsenal | 11 February 2010 | 22 December 2012 | 2 years, 315 days | 2010–12 | |
| Shelley Kerr | Scotland | Arsenal | 1 February 2013 | 25 May 2014 | 1 year, 113 days | 2013–14 | |
| John Bayer ‡ | England | Arsenal | 25 May 2014 | 29 August 2014 | 0 years, 96 days | 2014 | |
| Pedro Martínez Losa | Spain | Arsenal | 29 August 2014 | 25 October 2017 | 3 years, 57 days | 2014–17 | |
| Ismael García ‡ | Spain | Arsenal | 25 October 2017 | 7 November 2017 | 0 years, 13 days | 2017 | |
| Joe Montemurro | Australia | Arsenal | 7 November 2017 | 16 May 2021 | 3 years, 190 days | 2017–21 | |
| Jonas Eidevall | Sweden | Arsenal | 28 June 2021 | 15 October 2024 | 3 years, 109 days | 2021–24 | |
| Renée Slegers † | Netherlands | Arsenal | 15 October 2024 | Present | 2 years, 12 days | 2024– | |
| Gemma Davies | England | Aston Villa | 19 June 2018 | 25 January 2021 | 2 years, 220 days | 2020–21 | |
| Marcus Bignot ‡ | England | Aston Villa | 25 January 2021 | 10 May 2021 | 0 years, 105 days | 2021 | |
| Carla Ward | England | Aston Villa | 20 May 2021 | 18 May 2024 | 2 years, 364 days | 2021–24 | |
| Robert de Pauw | Netherlands | Aston Villa | 29 June 2024 | 11 December 2024 | 0 years, 157 days | 2024 | |
| Shaun Goater ‡ | Bermuda | Aston Villa | 11 December 2024 | 22 January 2025 | 0 years, 42 days | 2024–25 | |
| Natalia Arroyo | Spain | Aston Villa | 22 January 2025 | 28 September 2026 | 1 year, 249 days | 2025–26 | |
| Brian Sørensen ‡ | Denmark | Aston Villa | 28 September 2026 | Present | 0 years, 42 days | 2024–25 | |
| David Parker | England | Birmingham City | 14 January 2011 | 12 December 2016 | 5 years, 333 days | 2011–16 | |
| Marc Skinner | England | Birmingham City | 14 December 2016 | 13 January 2019 | 2 years, 30 days | 2016–19 | |
| Marta Tejedor | Spain | Birmingham City | 21 January 2019 | 3 March 2020 | 1 year, 42 days | 2019–20 | |
| Carla Ward | England | Birmingham City | 13 August 2020 | 16 May 2021 | 0 years, 276 days | 2020–21 | |
| Scott Booth | Scotland | Birmingham City | 30 June 2021 | 18 November 2021 | 0 years, 141 days | 2021 | |
| Tony Elliott ‡ | England | Birmingham City | 18 November 2021 | 21 November 2021 | 0 years, 3 days | 2021 | |
| Darren Carter | England | Birmingham City | 21 November 2021 | 11 April 2024 | 2 years, 142 days | 2021–22 | |
| Amy Merricks † | England | Birmingham City | 16 April 2024 | Present | 2 years, 194 days | 2024– | |
| Hope Powell | England | Brighton & Hove Albion | 19 July 2017 | 31 October 2022 | 5 years, 104 days | 2018–22 | |
| Amy Merricks ‡ | England | Brighton & Hove Albion | 31 October 2022 | 28 December 2022 | 0 years, 58 days | 2022 | |
| Jens Scheuer | Germany | Brighton & Hove Albion | 28 December 2022 | 6 March 2023 | 0 years, 65 days | 2022–23 | |
| Amy Merricks ‡ | England | Brighton & Hove Albion | 6 March 2023 | 7 April 2023 | 0 years, 32 days | 2023 | |
| Melissa Phillips | United States | Brighton & Hove Albion | 7 April 2023 | 1 February 2024 | 0 years, 300 days | 2023–24 | |
| Mikey Harris ‡ | England | Brighton & Hove Albion | 1 February 2024 | 10 July 2024 | 0 years, 160 days | 2024 | |
| Dario Vidošić | Australia | Brighton & Hove Albion | 10 July 2024 | 28 August 2026 | 2 years, 49 days | 2024–26 | |
| Arturo Ruiz † | Spain | Brighton & Hove Albion | 28 August 2026 | Present | 0 years, 60 days | 2026– | |
| Mark Sampson | Wales | Bristol Academy | 1 May 2010 | 6 December 2013 | 3 years, 219 days | 2011–13 | |
| Dave Edmondson | England | Bristol Academy | 22 January 2014 | 23 April 2015 | 1 year, 91 days | 2014–15 | |
| Lauren Smith ‡ | Wales | Bristol Academy | 23 April 2015 | 28 April 2015 | 0 years, 5 days | 2015 | |
| Willie Kirk | Scotland | Bristol City (Note: Originally managed as Bristol Academy, renamed Bristol City in 2016.) | 28 April 2015 | 29 May 2018 | 3 years, 31 days | 2015; 2017–18 | |
| Tanya Oxtoby | Australia | Bristol City | 4 July 2018 | 16 August 2021 | 3 years, 43 days | 2018–21 | |
| Matt Beard (Note: Maternity cover for incumbent manager Tanya Oxtoby.) ‡ | England | Bristol City | 15 January 2021 | 13 May 2021 | 0 years, 117 days | 2021 | |
| Lauren Smith | Wales | Bristol City | 21 June 2021 | 27 August 2024 | 3 years, 67 days | 2023–24 | |
| Karen Hills † | England | Charlton Athletic | 16 March 2021 | Present | 5 years, 225 days | 2021– | |
| Matt Beard | England | Chelsea | 1 June 2009 | 6 July 2012 | 3 years, 35 days | 2011–12 | |
| Emma Hayes | England | Chelsea | 14 August 2012 | 18 May 2024 | 11 years, 278 days | 2012–24 | |
| Sonia Bompastor † | France | Chelsea | 29 May 2024 | Present | 2 years, 151 days | 2024– | |
| Laura Kaminski | England | Crystal Palace | 14 July 2023 | 28 February 2025 | 1 year, 229 days | 2024–25 | |
| Leif Smerud | Norway | Crystal Palace | 1 March 2025 | 11 May 2025 | 0 years, 71 days | 2025 | |
| Jo Potter † | England | Crystal Palace | 24 June 2025 | Present | 1 year, 125 days | 2024– | |
| John Buckley | Scotland | Doncaster Rovers Belles | 19 June 2003 | 30 September 2013 | 10 years, 103 days | 2011–13 | |
| Glen Harris | England | Doncaster Rovers Belles | 8 December 2014 | 19 June 2016 | 1 year, 194 days | 2016 | |
| Emma Coates | England | Doncaster Rovers Belles | 22 June 2016 | 30 October 2017 | 1 year, 130 days | 2016 | |
| Mo Marley | England | Everton | 29 July 2002 | 13 October 2012 | 10 years, 76 days | 2011–12 | |
| Andy Spence | England | Everton | 14 November 2012 | 10 June 2015 | 2 years, 208 days | 2012–14 | |
| Andy Spence | England | Everton | 1 January 2016 | 7 November 2018 | 2 years, 310 days | 2017–18 | |
| Jennifer Herst ‡ | England | Everton | 7 November 2018 | 1 December 2018 | 0 years, 24 days | 2018 | |
| Willie Kirk | Scotland | Everton | 1 December 2018 | 16 October 2021 | 2 years, 319 days | 2018–21 | |
| Jean-Luc Vasseur | France | Everton | 29 October 2021 | 2 February 2022 | 0 years, 96 days | 2021–22 | |
| Chris Roberts ‡ | England | Everton | 2 February 2022 | 8 May 2022 | 0 years, 95 days | 2022 | |
| Brian Sørensen | Denmark | Everton | 5 June 2022 | 4 February 2026 | 3 years, 244 days | 2022–26 | |
| Scott Phelan † | England | Everton | 4 February 2026 | Present | 265 days | 2026– | |
| Jonathan Morgan | England | Leicester City | 30 June 2014 | 25 November 2021 | 7 years, 148 days | 2021 | |
| Lydia Bedford | England | Leicester City | 6 December 2021 | 3 November 2022 | 0 years, 332 days | 2021–22 | |
| Willie Kirk | Scotland | Leicester City | 3 November 2022 | 8 March 2024 | 1 year, 126 days | 2022–24 | |
| Jennifer Foster ‡ | England | Leicester City | 8 March 2024 | 15 July 2024 | 0 years, 129 days | 2024 | |
| Amandine Miquel | France | Leicester City | 15 July 2024 | 28 August 2025 | 1 year, 44 days | 2024–25 | |
| Rick Passmoor † | England | Leicester City | 4 September 2025 | Present | 1 year, 53 days | 2025– | |
| Rod Wilson | England | Lincoln | 8 November 2004 | 24 September 2011 | 6 years, 320 days | 2011 | |
| Glen Harris | England | Lincoln | 24 September 2011 | 11 October 2012 | 1 year, 17 days | 2011–12 | |
| Robbie Johnson | England | Liverpool | 8 July 2008 | 29 June 2012 | 3 years, 354 days | 2011–12 | |
| Andy Williams ‡ | England | Liverpool | 29 June 2012 | 6 August 2012 | 0 years, 38 days | 2012 | |
| Matt Beard | England | Liverpool | 6 August 2012 | 5 October 2015 | 3 years, 60 days | 2012–15 | |
| Scott Rogers | England | Liverpool | 22 October 2015 | 8 June 2018 | 2 years, 229 days | 2015–18 | |
| Neil Redfearn | England | Liverpool | 12 June 2018 | 14 September 2018 | 0 years, 94 days | 2018 | |
| Chris Kirkland ‡ | England | Liverpool | 14 September 2018 | 26 October 2018 | 0 years, 42 days | 2018 | |
| Vicky Jepson | England | Liverpool | 26 October 2018 | 12 January 2021 | 2 years, 78 days | 2018–20 | |
| Matt Beard | England | Liverpool | 13 May 2021 | 27 February 2025 | 3 years, 290 days | 2021–25 | |
| Amber Whiteley ‡ | England | Liverpool | 27 February 2025 | 10 May 2025 | 0 years, 72 days | 2025–25 | |
| Gareth Taylor † | Wales | Liverpool | 8 August 2025 | Present | 1 year, 80 days | 2025– | |
| Jocelyn Prêcheur | France | London City Lionesses | 27 June 2024 | 21 December 2025 | 1 year, 177 days | 2024–25 | |
| Eder Maestre † | Spain | London City Lionesses | 2 January 2026 | Present | 298 days | 2026– | |
| Nick Cushing | England | Manchester City | 3 November 2013 | 3 February 2020 | 6 years, 92 days | 2013–20 | |
| Alan Mahon ‡ | Ireland | Manchester City | 3 February 2020 | 28 May 2020 | 0 years, 115 days | 2020 | |
| Gareth Taylor | Wales | Manchester City | 28 May 2020 | 10 March 2025 | 4 years, 286 days | 2020–25 | |
| Nick Cushing ‡ | England | Manchester City | 10 March 2025 | 10 May 2025 | 0 years, 61 days | 2025–25 | |
| Andrée Jeglertz † | Sweden | Manchester City | 3 July 2025 | Present | 1 year, 116 days | 2025– | |
| Casey Stoney | England | Manchester United | 8 June 2018 | 31 May 2021 | 2 years, 357 days | 2019–21 | |
| Marc Skinner | England | Manchester United | 29 July 2021 | 3 August 2026 | 5 years, 5 days | 2021–26 | |
| Eva Olid | Spain | Manchester United | 5 August 2026 | Present | 83 days | 2026– | |
| Rick Passmoor | England | Notts County (Note: Originally managed as Lincoln, team relocated in 2014.) | 1 February 2013 | 21 April 2017 | 4 years, 79 days | 2013–16 | |
| Kelly Chambers | England | Reading | 1 August 2012 | 20 June 2023 | 10 years, 323 days | 2012–23 | |
| Carlton Fairweather | England | Sunderland | 29 December 2014 | 16 March 2017 | 2 years, 77 days | 2015–17 | |
| Melanie Reay § | England | Sunderland | 16 March 2017 | Present | 9 years, 225 days | 2017–18 | |
| Karen Hills (Note: Part of a joint managerial team.) | England | Tottenham Hotspur | 16 August 2009 | 19 November 2020 | 11 years, 95 days | 2019–20 | |
| Juan Carlos Amoros | Spain | Tottenham Hotspur | 15 February 2011 | 19 November 2020 | 9 years, 278 days | 2019–20 | |
| Rehanne Skinner | England | Tottenham Hotspur | 19 November 2020 | 13 March 2023 | 2 years, 114 days | 2020–23 | |
| Vicky Jepson ‡ | England | Tottenham Hotspur | 13 March 2023 | 7 July 2023 | 0 years, 116 days | 2023 | |
| Robert Vilahamn | Sweden | Tottenham Hotspur | 7 July 2023 | 8 June 2025 | 1 year, 336 days | 2023–25 | |
| Martin Ho † | England | Tottenham Hotspur | 4 July 2025 | Present | 1 year, 115 days | 2025– | |
| Matt Beard | England | West Ham United | 7 June 2018 | 19 November 2020 | 2 years, 165 days | 2018–20 | |
| Billy Stewart ‡ | England | West Ham United | 19 November 2020 | 23 December 2020 | 0 years, 34 days | 2020 | |
| Olli Harder | New Zealand | West Ham United | 23 December 2020 | 8 May 2022 | 1 year, 136 days | 2020–22 | |
| Paul Konchesky | England | West Ham United | 8 May 2022 | 28 May 2023 | 1 year, 20 days | 2022–23 | |
| Rehanne Skinner | England | West Ham United | 20 July 2023 | 18 December 2025 | 2 years, 151 days | 2023–25 | |
| Rita Guarino † | Italy | West Ham United | 22 December 2025 | Present | 309 days | 2025– | |
| Jamie Sherwood | England | Yeovil Town | 22 September 2014 | 21 May 2018 | 3 years, 241 days | 2017–18 | |
| Lee Burch | England | Yeovil Town | 14 June 2018 | 19 June 2019 | 1 year, 5 days | 2018–19 | |

=== By club ===
| Club | Total |
|---|---|
| Arsenal | 8 |
| Aston Villa | 6 |
| Birmingham City | 8 |
| Brighton & Hove Albion | 7 |
| Bristol City | 7 |
| Charlton Athletic | 1 |
| Chelsea | 3 |
| Crystal Palace | 3 |
| Doncaster Rovers Belles | 3 |
| Everton | 9 |
| Leicester City | 6 |
| Lincoln | 2 |
| Liverpool | 10 |
| London City Lionesses | 2 |
| Manchester City | 5 |
| Manchester United | 2 |
| Notts County | 1 |
| Reading | 1 |
| Sunderland | 2 |
| Tottenham Hotspur | 6 |
| West Ham United | 6 |
| Yeovil Town | 2 |

=== By nationality ===
| Country | Total appointments | Total individuals |
|---|---|---|
| England | 63 | 48 |
| Scotland | 6 | 4 |
| Spain | 6 | 6 |
| Wales | 5 | 3 |
| France | 4 | 4 |
| Australia | 3 | 3 |
| Sweden | 3 | 3 |
| Netherlands | 2 | 2 |
| Bermuda | 1 | 1 |
| Denmark | 1 | 1 |
| Germany | 1 | 1 |
| Ireland | 1 | 1 |
| Italy | 1 | 1 |
| New Zealand | 1 | 1 |
| Norway | 1 | 1 |
| United States | 1 | 1 |

== Records ==
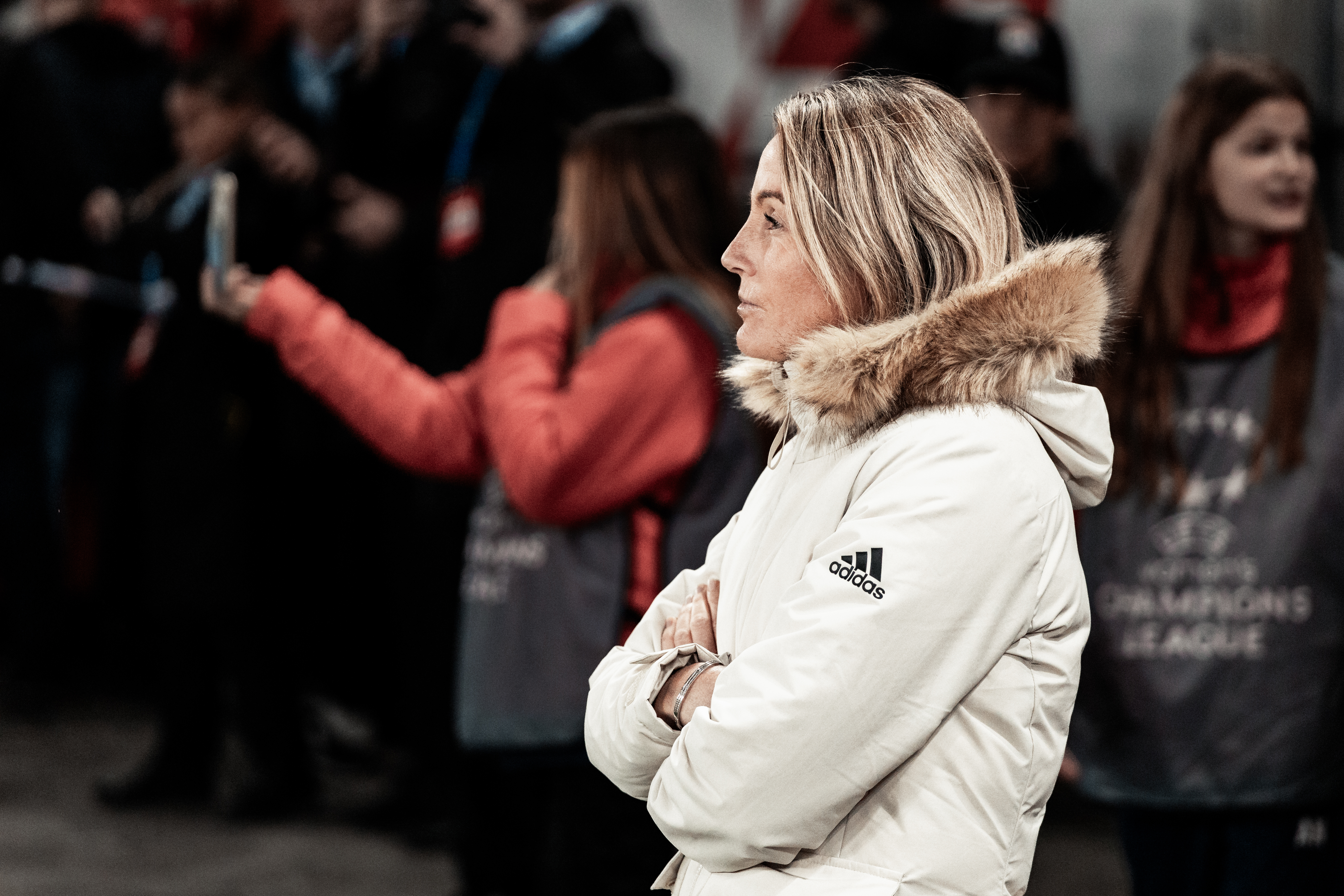
Sonia Bompastor has the highest win percentage of any manager and became the first to go undeated in a season.

As of the end of the 2024–25 season.

Managers listed in bold are currently managing in the WSL. Does not include caretaker/interim managers who never took on a permanent role.

=== Most games ===
| Rank | Manager | Games | Club(s) |
|---|---|---|---|
| 1 | (England) Emma Hayes | 212 | Chelsea (212) |
| 2 | (England) Matt Beard | 182 | Liverpool (106); West Ham United (41); Chelsea (23); Bristol City (12) |
| 3 | (England) Kelly Chambers | 142 | Reading (142) |
| 4 | (England) Marc Skinner | 127 | Manchester United (88); Birmingham City (39) |
| 5 | (Scotland) Willie Kirk | 120 | Everton (53); Bristol City (36); Leicester City (31) |
| 6 | (England) **Nick Cushing** | 110 | **Manchester City** (110) |
| 7 | (Wales) Gareth Taylor | 104 | Manchester City (104) |
| 8 | (England) **Rehanne Skinner** | 95 | Tottenham Hotspur (51); **West Ham United** (44) |
| 9 | (England) Carla Ward | 88 | Aston Villa (66); Birmingham City (22) |
| 10 | (England) David Parker | 86 | Birmingham City (86) |

=== Most wins ===
| Rank | Manager | Wins | Club(s) |
|---|---|---|---|
| 1 | (England) Emma Hayes | 151 | Chelsea (151) |
| 2 | (England) **Nick Cushing** | 75 | **Manchester City** (75) |
| 2 | (Wales) Gareth Taylor | 75 | Manchester City (75) |
| 4 | (England) **Marc Skinner** | 71 | **Manchester United** (53); Birmingham City (18) |
| 5 | (England) Matt Beard | 67 | Liverpool (45); West Ham United (13); Chelsea (7); Bristol City (2) |
| 6 | (Australia) Joe Montemurro | 53 | Arsenal (53) |
| 7 | (Sweden) Jonas Eidevall | 49 | Arsenal (49) |
| 8 | (England) Kelly Chambers | 41 | Reading (41) |
| 9 | (England) David Parker | 37 | Birmingham City (37) |
| 9 | (Scotland) Willie Kirk | 37 | Everton (20); Leicester City (9); Bristol City (8) |

=== Highest win percentage ===
| Rank | Manager | Wins (games) | Club(s) | Win % |
|---|---|---|---|---|
| 1 | (France) **Sonia Bompastor** | 19 (22) | **Chelsea** (2024–present) | 86.36 |
| 2 | (Netherlands) **Renée Slegers** | 14 (18) | **Arsenal** (2024–present) | 77.78 |
| 3 | (Australia) Joe Montemurro | 53 (70) | Arsenal (2017–21) | 75.71 |
| 4 | (Wales) Gareth Taylor | 75 (104) | Manchester City (2020–25) | 72.12 |
| 5 | (England) Laura Harvey | 20 (28) | Arsenal (2010–12) | 71.43 |
| 6 | (England) Emma Hayes | 151 (212) | Chelsea (2012–24) | 71.23 |
| 7 | (Sweden) Jonas Eidevall | 49 (70) | Arsenal (2021–24) | 70 |
| 8 | (England) **Nick Cushing** | 75 (110) | **Manchester City** (2013–20, 2025–present) | 68.18 |
| 9 | (England) Casey Stoney | 22 (36) | Manchester United (2018–21) | 61.11 |
| 10 | (Spain) Pedro Martínez Losa | 27 (46) | Arsenal (2014–17) | 58.7 |

=== Lowest win percentage ===
| Rank | Manager | Wins (games) | Club(s) | Win % |
|---|---|---|---|---|
| 1 | (England) Jamie Sherwood | 0 (26) | Yeovil Town (2014–18) | 0 |
| 1 | (England) Jonathan Morgan | 0 (8) | Leicester City (2014–21) | 0 |
| 1 | (Scotland) Scott Booth | 0 (7) | Birmingham City (2021) | 0 |
| 1 | (Germany) Jens Scheuer | 0 (3) | Brighton & Hove Albion (2022–23) | 0 |
| 1 | (England) Neil Redfearn | 0 (1) | Liverpool (2018) | 0 |
| 6 | (Wales) Lauren Smith | 1 (23) | Bristol City (2015, 2023–24) | 4.35 |
| 7 | (England) Laura Kaminski | 1 (14) | Crystal Palace (2024–25) | 7.14 |
| 8 | (England) Emma Coates | 1 (13) | Doncaster Rovers (2016–17) | 7.69 |
| 9 | (England) Lee Burch | 2 (20) | Yeovil Town (2018–19) | 10 |
| 9 | (England) Robbie Johnson | 2 (20) | Liverpool (2008–12) | 10 |

== Achievements ==
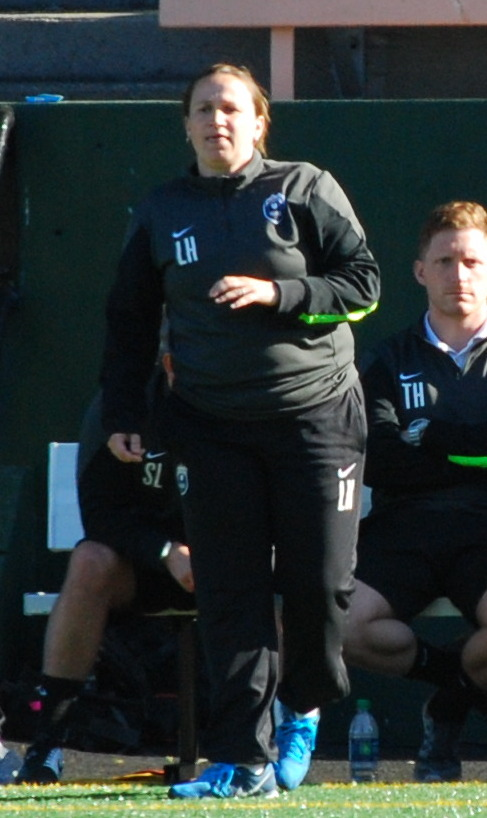
Laura Harvey won the first two WSL seasons managing Arsenal.

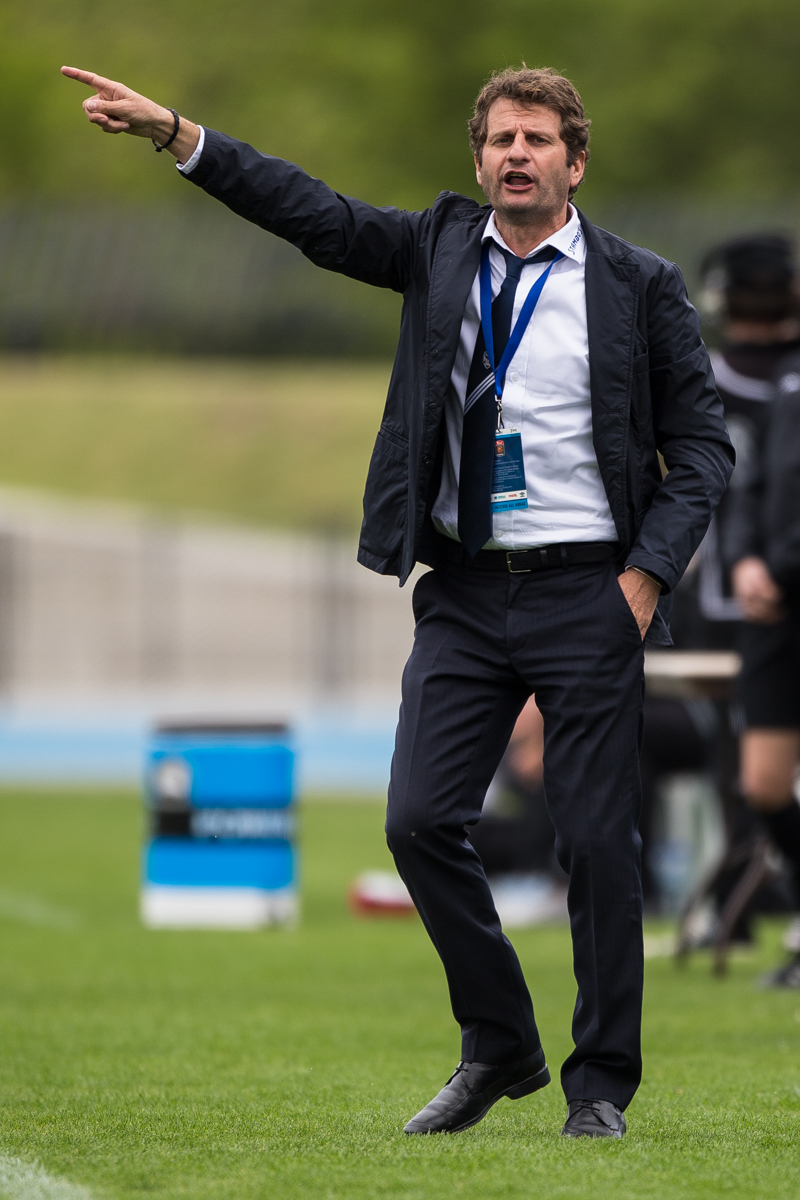
Joe Montemurro was the first non-British manager to win the WSL.

=== Title winning managers ===
By season

| Season | Name | Club | Ref. |
|---|---|---|---|
| 2011 | (England) Laura Harvey | Arsenal | |
| 2012 | (England) Laura Harvey | Arsenal | |
| 2013 | (England) Matt Beard | Liverpool | |
| 2014 | (England) Matt Beard | Liverpool | |
| 2015 | (England) Emma Hayes | Chelsea | |
| 2016 | (England) Nick Cushing | Manchester City | |
| 2017–18 | (England) Emma Hayes | Chelsea | |
| 2018–19 | (Australia) Joe Montemurro | Arsenal | |
| 2019–20 | (England) Emma Hayes | Chelsea | |
| 2020–21 | (England) Emma Hayes | Chelsea | |
| 2021–22 | (England) Emma Hayes | Chelsea | |
| 2022–23 | (England) Emma Hayes | Chelsea | |
| 2023–24 | (England) Emma Hayes | Chelsea | |
| 2024–25 | (France) Sonia Bompastor | Chelsea | |

By manager

| Rank | Name | Titles | Club(s) | Seasons |
|---|---|---|---|---|
| 1 | (England) Emma Hayes | 7 | Chelsea | 2015, 2017–18, 2019–20, 2020–21, 2021–22, 2022–23, 2023–24 |
| 2 | (England) Laura Harvey | 2 | Arsenal | 2011, 2012 |
| 2 | (England) Matt Beard | 2 | Liverpool | 2013, 2014 |
| 4 | (France) Sonia Bompastor | 1 | Chelsea | 2024–25 |
| 4 | (England) Nick Cushing | 1 | Manchester City | 2016 |
| 4 | (Australia) Joe Montemurro | 1 | Arsenal | 2018–19 |

== See also ==
- Women's Super League Manager of the Season
