= Women's Super League Manager of the Season =

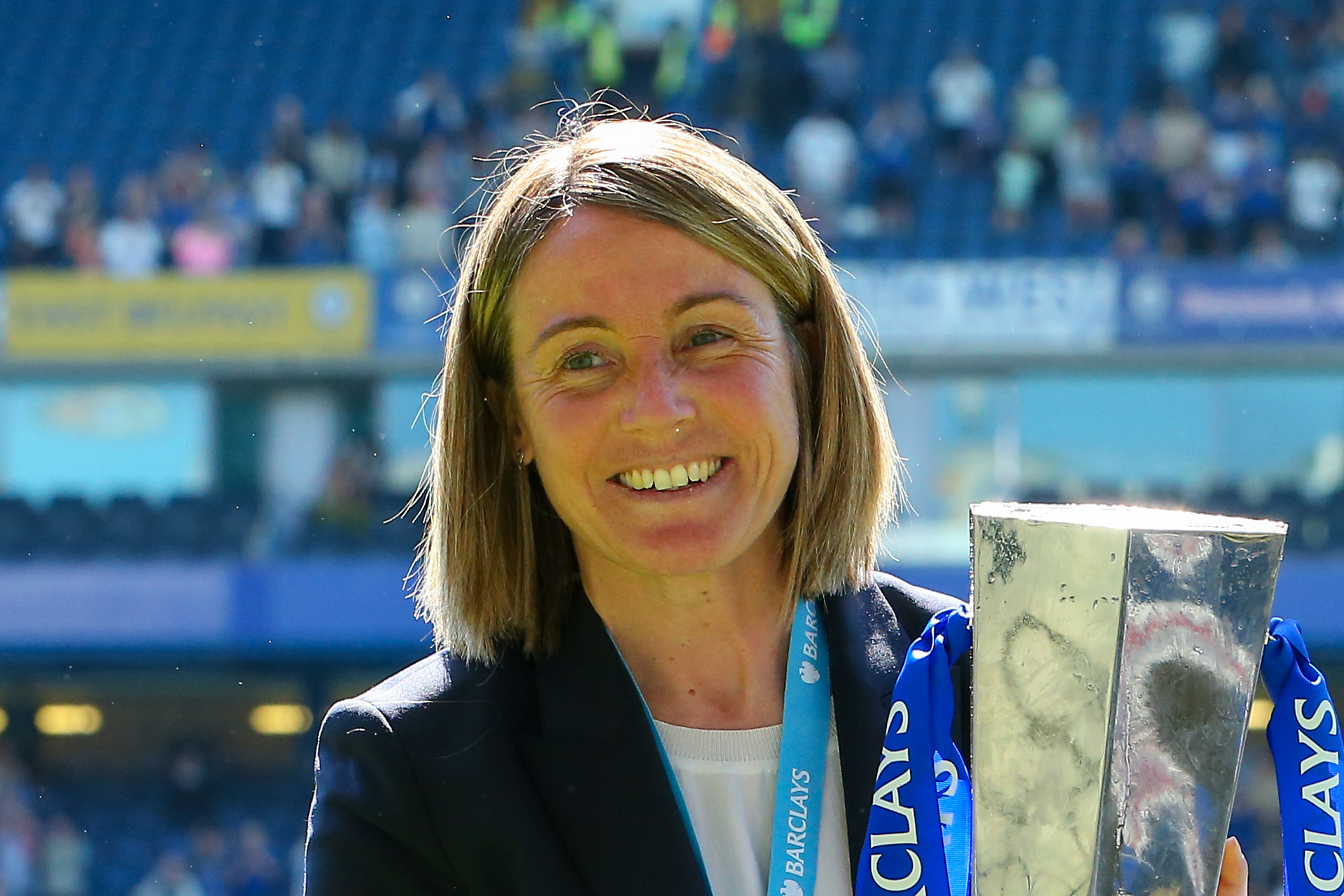
- Sonia Bompastor is the current holder of the award.
- Awarded for: The most outstanding manager in each given Women's Super League season
- Sponsored by: Barclays
- Country: England
- Presented by: Women's Super League

Highlights
- Most awards: Emma Hayes (6)
- Most team wins: Chelsea (7)

The Women's Super League Manager of the Season is an annual association football award presented to managers in England. It recognises the most outstanding manager in the Women's Super League each season. Below is a list of all the recipients named as WSL manager of the year either at The FA Women's Football Awards (2011–18), by the League Managers Association (2019) or Women's Super League awards (2020–present):

== Winners ==
Key
†	Denotes the club was not WSL champion in same season

Number of wins in brackets.

Year	Name	Club	Ref.
2011	(England) Laura Harvey	Arsenal	
2012	(Wales) Mark Sampson	Bristol Academy †	
2013	(England) Matt Beard	Liverpool	
2014	(England) David Parker	Birmingham City †	
2015	(England) Emma Hayes	Chelsea	
2016	(England) Nick Cushing	Manchester City	
2017 (Spring Series)	(England) Andy Spence	Everton †	
2017–18	(England) Emma Hayes (2)	Chelsea	
2018–19	(Australia) Joe Montemurro	Arsenal	
2019–20	(England) Emma Hayes (3)	Chelsea	
2020–21	(England) Emma Hayes (4)	Chelsea	
2021–22	(England) Emma Hayes (5)	Chelsea	
2022–23	(England) Emma Hayes (6)	Chelsea	
2023–24	(England) Matt Beard (2)	Liverpool †	
2024–25	(France) Sonia Bompastor	Chelsea	

== Multiple awards won by managers ==
The following table lists the number of awards won by managers who have won the Manager of the Season awards.

Managers in bold are still active in the Women's Super League.

Awards	Manager	Club(s)	Year(s)
6	(England) Emma Hayes	Chelsea	2015, 2018, 2020, 2021, 2022, 2023
2	(England) Matt Beard	Liverpool	2013, 2024
1	(England) Laura Harvey	Arsenal	2011
1	(Wales) Mark Sampson	Bristol Academy	2012
1	(England) David Parker	Birmingham City	2014
1	(England) Nick Cushing	Manchester City	2016
1	(England) Andy Spence	Everton	2017
1	(Australia) Joe Montemurro	Arsenal	2019
1	(France) **Sonia Bompastor**	Chelsea	2025

== Awards won by nationality ==
Country	Managers	Total
England	6	12
Australia	1	1
Wales	1	1
France	1	1

== Awards won by club ==
Club	Managers	Total
Chelsea	2	7
Liverpool	1	2
Arsenal	2	2
Birmingham City	1	1
Bristol Academy	1	1
Everton	1	1
Manchester City	1	1

== See also ==
- List of Women's Super League managers
- Women's Super League Player of the Season
- Women's Super League Golden Boot
- Women's Super League Golden Glove
- The FA Women's Football Awards
