= 2020–21 FA WSL =

Tenth season of the top English women's association football league

FA WSL
- Season: 2020–21
- Dates: 5 September 2020 – 9 May 2021
- Champions: Chelsea; 4th title
- Relegated: Bristol City
- Champions League: Chelsea; Manchester City; Arsenal
- Matches: 132
- Goals: 413 (3.13 per match)
- Top goalscorer: Sam Kerr (21 goals)
- Biggest home win: Chelsea 9–0 Bristol City]br>(13 September 2020)
- Biggest away win: West Ham United 1–9 Arsenal (12 September 2020)
- Highest scoring: West Ham United 1–9 Arsenal (12 September 2020)
- Longest winning run: 12 matches Manchester City
- Longest unbeaten run: 16 matches Manchester City
- Longest winless run: 13 matches Birmingham City
- Longest losing run: 5 matches Bristol City

The 2020–21 FA WSL season (also known as the Barclays FA Women's Super League for sponsorship reasons) was the tenth edition of the FA Women's Super League (WSL) since it was formed in 2010. It was the third season after the rebranding of the four highest levels in English women's football.

From the 2020–21 season, the FA WSL was given three Champions League places per season, increased from the previous two.

Chelsea were the defending champions, having been awarded the 2019–20 title on a points-per-game basis following the curtailment of the season due to COVID-19 pandemic in England. They became the first team since Liverpool in 2014 to defend a WSL title.

== Teams ==
Twelve teams contested the FA WSL this season. At the end of the previous season, Liverpool were relegated while Aston Villa were promoted.

Locations of the 2020–21 FA WSL teams

Team	Location	Ground	Capacity	2019–20 season
Arsenal	Borehamwood	Meadow Park	4,502	3rd
Aston Villa	Walsall	Bescot Stadium	11,000	WC, 1st
Birmingham City	Solihull	Damson Park	3,050	11th
Brighton & Hove Albion	Crawley	Broadfield Stadium	6,134	9th
Bristol City	Bath	Twerton Park	3,528	10th
Chelsea	Kingston upon Thames	Kingsmeadow	4,850	1st
Everton	Liverpool	Walton Hall Park	2,200	6th
Manchester City	Manchester	Academy Stadium	7,000	2nd
Manchester United	Leigh	Leigh Sports Village	12,000	4th
Reading	Reading	Madejski Stadium	24,161	5th
Tottenham Hotspur	Canons Park	The Hive Stadium	6,500	7th
West Ham United	Dagenham	Victoria Road	6,078	8th

=== Stadium changes ===
Four teams changed home ground prior to the start of the season: Reading relocated from Adams Park in High Wycombe to the Madejski Stadium, home of the team's male affiliate since it was constructed in 1998. Newly-promoted Aston Villa signed a two-year deal with Walsall to play their home games at Bescot Stadium, moving from the Trevor Brown Memorial Ground and West Ham United signed a one-year deal with Dagenham & Redbridge F.C. to play at Victoria Road for the season having previously played at the club's Rush Green training ground stadium. In a bid to enable increased attendances amid COVID-19 restrictions and social distancing measures, Bristol City announced they were moving from the 1,500 capacity Stoke Gifford Stadium in Filton which had been purpose-built by the club in 2011 ahead of the first WSL season, to Twerton Park, an 3,528 capacity stadium home to Bath City.

=== Personnel and kits ===
Team	Manager	Captain	Kit manufacturer	Shirt sponsor
Arsenal	(Australia) Joe Montemurro	(Scotland) Kim Little	Adidas	Fly Emirates
Aston Villa	(England) Marcus Bignot (interim)	(Germany) Marisa Ewers	Kappa	Cazoo
Birmingham City	(England) Carla Ward	(Scotland) Christie Murray	Nike	Biffa
Brighton & Hove Albion	(England) Hope Powell	(England) Danielle Buet	Nike	American Express
Bristol City	(England) Matt Beard (maternity cover)	(England) Jasmine Matthews	Hummel	Yeo Valley
Chelsea	(England) Emma Hayes	(Sweden) Magdalena Eriksson	Nike	Three
Everton	(Scotland) Willie Kirk	(Scotland) Lucy Graham	Hummel	MegaFon
Manchester City	(Wales) Gareth Taylor	(England) Steph Houghton	Puma	Etihad Airways
Manchester United	(England) Casey Stoney	(England) Katie Zelem	Adidas	Chevrolet
Reading	(England) Kelly Chambers	(Wales) Natasha Harding	Macron	YLD
Tottenham Hotspur	(England) Rehanne Skinner	(Wales) Josie Green	Nike	AIA
West Ham United	(New Zealand) Olli Harder	(England) Gilly Flaherty	Umbro	Betway

=== Managerial changes ===
Team	Outgoing manager	Manner of departure	Date of vacancy	Position in table	Incoming manager	Date of appointment
Manchester City	(Republic of Ireland) Alan Mahon (interim)	End of interim period	2 February 2020	Pre-season	(Wales) Gareth Taylor	28 May 2020
Birmingham City	(England) Charlie Baxter (interim)	End of interim period	3 March 2020	Pre-season	(England) Carla Ward	13 August 2020
West Ham United	(England) Matt Beard	Mutual consent	19 November 2020	9th	(England) Billy Stewart (interim)	19 November 2020
Tottenham Hotspur	(England) Karen Hills (Spain) Juan Carlos Amorós	Sacked	19 November 2020	11th	(England) Rehanne Skinner	19 November 2020
West Ham United	(England) Billy Stewart (interim)	End of interim period	23 December 2020	10th	(New Zealand) Olli Harder	23 December 2020
Bristol City	(Australia) Tanya Oxtoby	Maternity leave	15 January 2021	12th	(England) Matt Beard (interim)	15 January 2021
Aston Villa	(England) Gemma Davies	Retained head coach role	25 January 2021	11th	(England) Marcus Bignot (interim)	25 January 2021

== League table ==
Pos	Team	Pld	W	D	L	GF	GA	GD	Pts	Qualification or relegation
1	Chelsea (C)	22	18	3	1	69	10	+59	57	Qualification for the Champions League group stage
2	Manchester City	22	17	4	1	65	13	+52	55	Qualification for the Champions League second round
3	Arsenal	22	15	3	4	63	15	+48	48	Qualification for the Champions League first round
4	Manchester United	22	15	2	5	44	20	+24	47	
5	Everton	22	9	5	8	39	30	+9	32	
6	Brighton & Hove Albion	22	8	3	11	21	41	−20	27	
7	Reading	22	5	9	8	25	41	−16	24	
8	Tottenham Hotspur	22	5	5	12	18	41	−23	20	
9	West Ham United	22	3	6	13	21	39	−18	15	
10	Aston Villa	22	3	6	13	15	47	−32	15	
11	Birmingham City	22	3	6	13	15	44	−29	14 (Note: On 7 May 2021, Birmingham City were deducted one point for fielding an ineligible player in a draw against Reading on 25 April 2021.)	
12	Bristol City (R)	22	2	6	14	18	72	−54	12	Relegation to the Championship

Source: FA WSL
Rules for classification: 1) Points; 2) Goal difference; 3) Number of goals scored.
(C) Champions; (R) Relegated

== Results ==
Home \ Away	ARS	ASV	BIR	BHA	BRI	CHE	EVE	MCI	MNU	REA	TOT	WHU
Arsenal	—	0–0	3–0	2–0	3–1	1–1	4–0	1–2	2–0	6–1	6–1	2–0
Aston Villa	0–4	—	0–1	0–2	2–2	0–4	0–6	0–2	0–2	2–2	1–0	0–0
Birmingham City	0–4	1–1	—	0–0	1–1	0–1	0–4	0–4	2–5	1–1	0–1	1–2
Brighton & Hove Albion	0–5	0–2	2–0	—	3–1	0–1	0–5	1–7	1–0	1–3	2–0	1–0
Bristol City	0–4	0–4	0–4	3–0	—	0–5	0–4	0–3	0–1	3–2	2–2	0–4
Chelsea	3–0	2–0	6–0	1–2	9–0	—	4–0	3–1	2–1	5–0	4–0	3–2
Everton	1–2	3–1	1–1	2–2	4–0	0–3	—	0–3	0–2	1–1	1–0	3–1
Manchester City	2–1	7–0	4–0	0–0	8–1	2–2	1–0	—	3–0	1–0	4–1	4–0
Manchester United	1–0	3–0	2–0	3–0	6–1	1–1	2–0	2–2	—	0–2	4–1	2–0
Reading	1–1	3–1	0–1	3–2	1–1	0–5	1–1	1–1	1–2	—	0–0	0–5
Tottenham Hotspur	0–3	3–1	W.O. (Note: Independent tribunal awarded three points to Tottenham after Birmingham failed to fulfil the fixture due to a player shortage. No scoreline was specified.)	3–1	1–1	0–2	2–3	0–3	0–1	1–1	—	1–1
West Ham United	1–9	0–0	2–2	0–1	1–1	0–2	0–0	0–1	2–4	0–1	0–1	—

Source: The FA
Legend: Blue = home team win; Yellow = draw; Red = away team win.

== Season statistics ==
=== Top scorers ===
Rank	Player	Club	Goals
1	(Australia) Sam Kerr	Chelsea	21
2	(Netherlands) Vivianne Miedema	Arsenal	18
3	(England) Fran Kirby	Chelsea	16
4	(Australia) Caitlin Foord	Arsenal	10
4	(England) Chloe Kelly	Manchester City	10
4	(England) Ellen White	Manchester City	10
7	(Denmark) Pernille Harder	Chelsea	9
7	(England) Ella Toone	Manchester United	9
9	(Scotland) Caroline Weir	Manchester City	8
9	(Netherlands) Inessa Kaagman	Brighton & Hove Albion	8

=== Clean sheets ===
Rank	Player	Club	Clean sheets
1	(Germany) Ann-Katrin Berger	Chelsea	12
2	(England) Ellie Roebuck	Manchester City	11
3	(England) Mary Earps	Manchester United	10
4	(Australia) Lydia Williams	Arsenal	7
5	(Scotland) Sandy MacIver	Everton	6
5	(Republic of Ireland) Megan Walsh	Brighton & Hove Albion	6
5	(Germany) Lisa Weiß	Aston Villa	6
8	(England) Hannah Hampton	Birmingham City	4
8	(Austria) Manuela Zinsberger	Arsenal	4
10	(Republic of Ireland) Courtney Brosnan	West Ham United	3
10	(Republic of Ireland) Grace Moloney	Reading	3

== Awards ==
=== Monthly awards ===
Month	Manager of the Month		Player of the Month		Ref.
Month	Manager	Club	Player	Club	Ref.
September	(England) Hope Powell	Brighton & Hove Albion	(Netherlands) Jill Roord	Arsenal	
October	(England) Carla Ward	Birmingham City	(Netherlands) Vivianne Miedema	Arsenal	
November	(England) Casey Stoney	Manchester United	(United States) Tobin Heath	Manchester United	
December	(England) Casey Stoney	Manchester United	(England) Leah Galton	Manchester United	
January	(England) Emma Hayes	Chelsea	(England) Fran Kirby	Chelsea	
February	(England) Hope Powell	Brighton & Hove Albion	(England) Lucy Bronze	Manchester City	
March	(Australia) Joe Montemurro	Arsenal	(England) Lotte Wubben-Moy	Arsenal	
April	(Australia) Joe Montemurro	Arsenal	(Australia) Sam Kerr	Chelsea	

=== Annual awards ===
Award	Winner	Club
Barclays FA WSL Player of the Season	(England) Fran Kirby	Chelsea
Barclays FA WSL Manager of the Season	(England) Emma Hayes	Chelsea
PFA Players' Player of the Year	(England) Fran Kirby	Chelsea
PFA Young Player of the Year	(England) Lauren Hemp	Manchester City
FWA Footballer of the Year	(England) Fran Kirby	Chelsea

PFA Team of the Year
Goalkeeper	(Germany) Ann-Katrin Berger (Chelsea)			
Defenders	(Norway) Maren Mjelde (Chelsea)	(England) Leah Williamson (Arsenal)	(Sweden) Magdalena Eriksson (Chelsea)	(Republic of Ireland) Katie McCabe (Arsenal)
Midfielders	(Scotland) Caroline Weir (Manchester City)		(United States) Sam Mewis (Manchester City)	
Forwards	(England) Chloe Kelly (Manchester City)	(England) Fran Kirby (Chelsea)	(England) Lauren Hemp (Manchester City)	(Australia) Sam Kerr (Chelsea)

== See also ==
- 2020–21 FA Women's League Cup
- 2020–21 FA Women's Championship (tier 2)
- 2020–21 FA Women's National League (tier 3)
