= Sonia Bompastor =

French footballer and manager (born 1980)

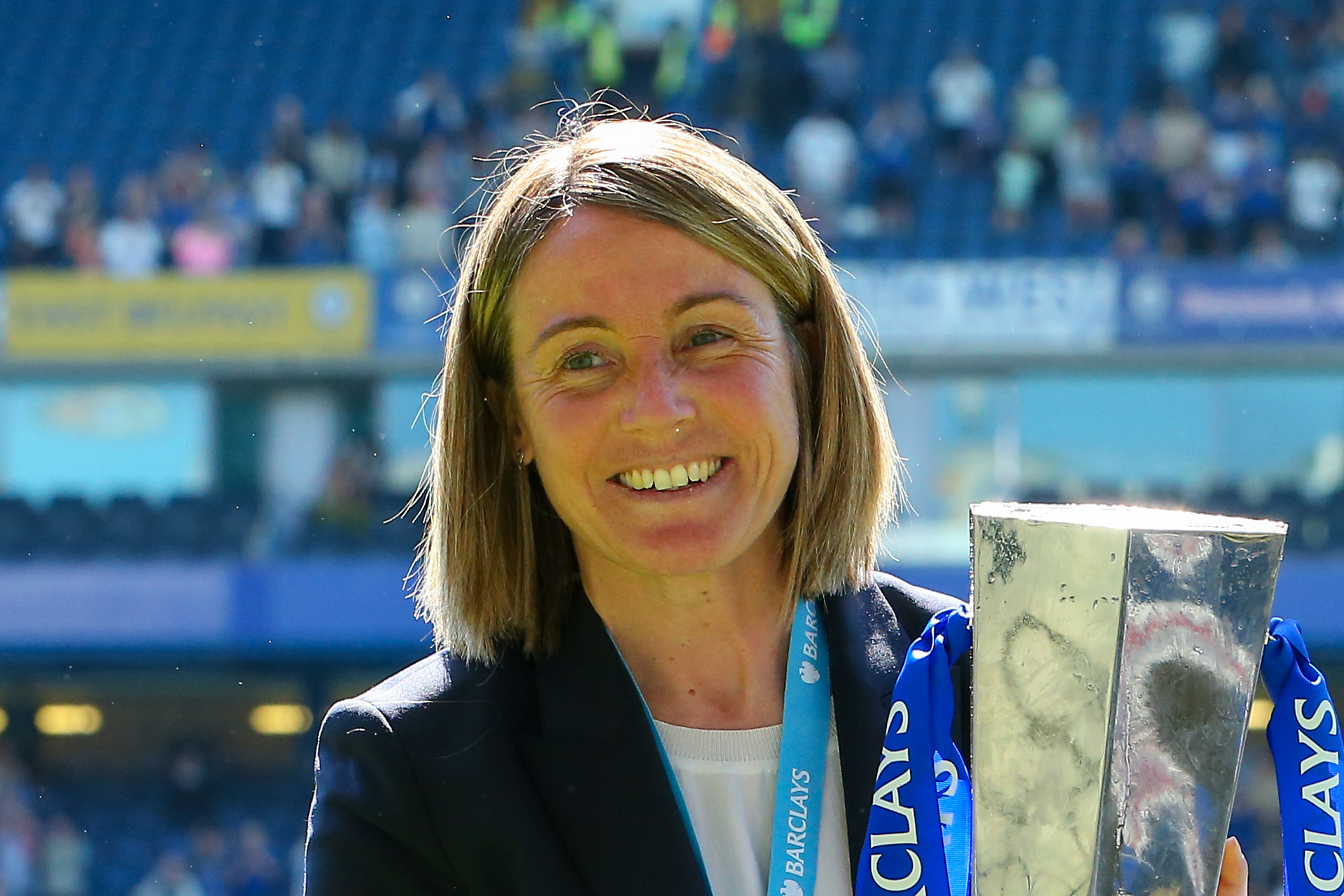
- Bompastor in 2025

Personal information
- Full name: Sonia Bompastor
- Date of birth: 8 June 1980 (age 46)
- Place of birth: Blois, Loir-et-Cher, France
- Height: 1.62 m (5 ft 4 in)
- Position: Midfielder

Team information
- Current team: Chelsea (manager)

Youth career
- 1988–1994: US Mer
- 1994–1997: US Thoury
- 1997–2000: Tours EC

Senior career*
Years	Team	Apps	(Gls)
2000–2002	La Roche-sur-Yon		
2002–2006	Montpellier	83	(36)
2006–2009	Lyon	54	(15)
2009–2010	Washington Freedom	41	(6)
2009–2010	→ Paris Saint-Germain (loan)	13	(10)
2010–2013	Lyon	59	(4)

International career
1997–1998	France U18	3	(0)
2000–2013	France	156	(19)

Managerial career
- 2013–2021: Lyon Academy
- 2021–2024: Lyon
- 2024–: Chelsea
- * Club domestic league appearances and goals

Sonia Bompastor (French: [sɔnja bɔ̃pastɔʁ], European Portuguese: [ˈsɔnjɐ βõpɐʃˈtoɾ]; born 8 June 1980) is a French football manager and former player who manages Chelsea of the English Women's Super League. She is the first person to win the UEFA Women's Champions League as both a player and a manager, and is widely considered to be one of the best women's players in French history.

Bompastor was a midfielder, preferably on the left side; she also played at left back. She was a two-time winner of the National Union of Professional Footballers (UNFP) Female Player of the Year, and following a move to the Women's Professional Soccer (WPS) league in the United States, earned Player of the Month and All-Star honors.

Bompastor began her football career joining US Mer in 1988. In 1992, she joined US Thoury. In the same year, she earned selection to nationally recognized Clairefontaine academy joining alongside a select group of female players. After her stint at Clairefontaine, she joined Tours EC, now the women's section of professional club Tours FC. In 2000, she joined Division 1 Féminine club ESOF Vendée La Roche-sur-Yon and performed well enough to earn a move to Montpellier. At Montpellier, Bompastor earned domestic and individual honors, which resulted in a move to champions Lyon. In 2008, she joined the new United States-based women's soccer league, Women's Professional Soccer, after her American playing rights were chosen by Washington Freedom in the 2008 WPS International Draft. After helping the Freedom reached the playoffs, Bompastor returned to France where she played for Paris Saint-Germain on loan. In 2010, she announced that she would be returned to Lyon for the 2010–11 season and, subsequently, was a part of the team that won the 2010–11 UEFA Women's Champions League.

Bompastor is also a French international. Prior to playing for the senior team, she played at youth level representing the under-18 team at the 1998 UEFA Women's Under-18 Championship. She made her senior international debut in February 2000 in a friendly match against Scotland. From 2004 to 2006, she served as the national team's captain. Bompastor has played in numerous tournaments for her nation beginning with UEFA Women's Euro 2001.

In June 2013, Bompastor chose to end her career after the French Women's Cup final. She became the academy director of Olympique Lyonnais Féminin after retirement. In April 2021, she took over as manager of Lyon's first team, where she managed the team for four seasons. In 2024, Bompastor was appointed by English club Chelsea, from which she managed to win the domestic treble in her first season.

== Club career ==
=== Early career ===
Bompastor was born in Blois, Loir-et-Cher, and began playing football at an early age. Of Portuguese origin, both of her parents are from Póvoa de Varzim and most of her family still lives in the area. Bompastor told Ma Chaîne Sport that she always goes to Póvoa when she has the opportunity to do so. She was drawn to football through her father, who was a referee. He took her to many of the games he refereed on the weekends and Bompastor quickly developed an attraction towards the game.

Bompastor began her football career in 1988 at US Mer, a local club in a neighboring commune, playing with the club's mixed team. In 1992, she joined US Thoury. That same year, she earned selection to an exclusive female team that was given clearance to train at the Clairefontaine academy by the French Football Federation. The academy had quickly become a high-level training facility for male football players and supporters of women's football wanted younger women to be afforded the same benefits from the facilities as young men. Following vocational training at Clairefontaine, Bompastor moved to amateur team Tours EC. She spent four years at the club before joining ESOF Vendée La Roche-sur-Yon of the Division 1 Féminine in 2000.

=== Professional career ===
Bompastor's professional career began with ESOF Vendée La Roche-sur-Yon in 2000. She scored seven goals over her two years with the club before moving to Montpellier HSC in 2002.

At Montpellier, Bompastor blossomed and scored 38 goals over four seasons while helping the club win league titles in 2004 and 2005, as well as the 2006 Challenge de France (women's version of the Coupe de France). In that 2005-06 campaign, Montpellier also reached the UEFA Women's Cup semi-finals.

Bompastor playing for Washington Freedom in 2009

Lyon was the next destination for Bompastor, for whom she joined in the summer of 2006. She became an important part of the side that won back-to-back league titles in 2006-07 and 2007-08, also winning the Challenge de France in 2008 to complete a domestic double. This gave her six titles in a span of four years, equal to teammates Camille Abily and Élodie Thomis, who were also a part of the same Montpellier team Bompastor had previously played for.

On 24 September 2008, Bompastor was selected to join the new United States-based women's soccer league, Women's Professional Soccer, after her American playing rights were chosen by Washington Freedom in the 2008 WPS International Draft. Her Lyon teammate Louisa Nécib was also chosen by the Freedom. In the 2009 Women's Professional Soccer season, Bompastor appeared in 19 games (all starts, 1709 total minutes) and scored four goals with six assists. She was included in the league's all-star team in each of her two seasons with Washington Freedom.

Following the conclusion of the season, she returned to France with a loan move to D1 Féminine side Paris Saint-Germain, for whom she scored an impressive ten goals in 13 league games. In 2010, Bompastor confirmed she would re-join Lyon ahead of the 2010-11 season, where she reunited with former Montpellier coach Patrice Lair.

In her first season back, Bompastor captained Lyon to the French league title and she also won the first UEFA Women's Champions League of her career, with Les Fenottes beating German outfit Turbine Potsdam 2-0 in the final at Craven Cottage. Bompastor was at the heart of a successful Lyon team that repeated their league and Champions League successes in the next season, also adding the Coupe de France to complete the first treble in Lyon's history. In the 2012 UWCL final, they beat Frankfurt 2-0 in front of over 50,000 fans at the Olympiastadion in Munich, claimed by UEFA to be a European record for women's club football.

Bompastor again led Lyon to the D1 Féminine title in 2012-13 but her side were beaten 1-0 by Wolfsburg in the 2013 Champions League final. In June 2013, the defender announced that she will retire from football after that month's Coupe de France Féminine final against AS Saint-Étienne. "I figured it was a good time (to stop)," she said. "In terms of career and track record, I've won all that I could win. As a woman, I have other goals such as starting a family."

In her last match before retirement, she played 81 minutes and provided a set-piece assist for Eugenie Le Sommer as Lyon beat Saint-Étienne 3-1 in the 2013 Coupe de France final. This triumph completed the third domestic double of Bompastor's career. Across the three seasons of her second spell with Lyon, Bompastor made 94 appearances, scored nine goals, lifted seven trophies and solidified her legacy as one of the world's best women's players of her generation.

== International career ==
Bompastor made her international debut for the Bleues on 26 February 2000 in a match against Scotland. She was a member of the squads that participated in the 2001 (her first tournament with France), 2005, and 2009 editions of the UEFA Women's Championship. She also represented France at the 2003 FIFA Women's World Cup and the 2011 FIFA Women's World Cup. Bompastor's strong displays in the 2011 edition, where France finished fourth, saw her named in FIFA's All-Star Team of the Tournament.

On 27 September 2008, Bompastor picked up her 100th cap in a crucial UEFA Women's Euro 2009 qualifying match against Iceland, which France won 2–1. She finished her international career with 156 appearances and 19 goals to her name, making her France's eighth most capped player of all time (as of February 2025).

== Managerial career ==
=== Lyon ===
After retiring from playing football in 2013, Bompastor moved into a coaching role at Lyon's academy. She managed at the club's academy for eight years.

In April 2021, Bompastor was appointed manager of Lyon's first team, making her the first woman to ever take charge of Les Fenottes. During the 2021-22 campaign, her first full season in charge, she impressively led Lyon to a double: Division 1 and UEFA Women's Champions League success. The UWCL triumph in May 2022, where her side beat Barcelona 3-1 in the final, meant Bompastor became the first person to win Europe's top competition as both a player and a head coach.

Bompastor won three consecutive Division 1 titles in the 2021–22, 2022–23 and 2023–24 seasons respectively. In the 2022–23 UWCL, Bompastor's Lyon team reached the quarter-final, where they fell 3-2 on aggregate to Chelsea. The following year, in the 2023–24 UWCL, she led them to the final of the competition for a second time, but they ultimately lost 2–0 to the quadruple-winning Barcelona. In total, she lifted seven trophies overall during her managerial spell at Lyon.

=== Chelsea ===
On 29 May 2024, Bompastor was appointed manager of Chelsea, on a four-year deal. She replaced Emma Hayes, who had been in charge for 12 years.

She managed her first match with Chelsea on 20 September 2024 in a 1–0 win over Aston Villa. On 12 October 2024, she led Chelsea to the club's first ever win at the Emirates Stadium and the club's first away win to Arsenal since 2020 when they won the match 2–1.

On 16 November 2024, Chelsea beat Manchester City 2–0 to go to the top of the WSL table after winning each of their seven league matches with Bompastor in charge (ten wins out of ten matches in all competitions). It was the best ever start for any manager in the league’s fourteen-year history.

On 15 March 2025, Bompastor won her first trophy with Chelsea after beating Manchester City 2–1 at Pride Park in the 2024–25 FA Women's League Cup final. It was the club's first success in the competition since 2021 after they had lost the previous three finals in a row.

On 30 April 2025, Bompastor's Chelsea beat Manchester United 1–0 at Leigh Sports Village to seal a sixth consecutive WSL title and a ninth league title overall for the club. In doing so, Bompastor became the first manager since Laura Harvey to win the WSL title in her first season in charge. After ending the WSL campaign at Stamford Bridge with a 1-0 win over Liverpool, it meant that Bompastor led to Chelsea becoming the first team in the competition's history to finish a 22-game season unbeaten while also setting a new record of 60 points which is the best points tally ever by a single team in the competition's history.

On 18 May 2025, Chelsea beat Manchester United 3-0 in the 2024–25 Women's FA Cup final in front of a crowd of 74,412 at Wembley Stadium to complete a historic unbeaten domestic treble. In doing so, Chelsea became the first English women's team since Arsenal in 2000–01 to win the domestic treble unbeaten and Bompastor is just the third manager to win a domestic treble in the WSL era after Laura Harvey for Arsenal in 2011 and Emma Hayes for Chelsea in 2021.

On 6 February 2026, it was announced that Bompastor had signed a contract extension to keep her with Chelsea until 2030. Having been 12 points behind Manchester City in the league table in early February 2026 and faced criticism of her managerial tenure at Chelsea, she spoke to the media following a 2–0 victory over Tottenham on 8 February 2026, which reduced the gap behind the league leaders to 9 points, defending herself by saying "I know who I am, I don't need people outside my environment to tell me who I am. I will always make sure I give my best. I know I have the competence, I know I have the knowledge, I know the women's game and I do my best for Chelsea."

On 15 March 2026, amid better performances, Bompastor won her fourth trophy with Chelsea after beating Manchester United 2–0 at Ashton Gate in the 2025-26 FA Women's League Cup final. It meant that the club had defended the trophy that they won last season and have won the competition in back to back seasons for the first time since 2021.

On 19 September 2026, Bompastor managed the 200th match of her managerial career in a 2-0 win over Birmingham City as Chelsea manager. It meant that she had won 164 of those matches combined that she had managed at Lyon and Chelsea with an 82% win rate.

== Personal life ==
In February 2025, Bompastor and her former teammate Camille Abily announced that they have been in a relationship for 13 years and that they have four children together. Abily was Lyon's assistant coach before Bompastor took over at the club, and she has been Bompastor's assistant both at Lyon and Chelsea.

== Career statistics ==
=== Club ===
As of 18 September 2016

Appearances and goals by club, season and competition
Club	Season	League		Cup		Continental		Total	
Club	Season	Apps	Goals	Apps	Goals	Apps	Goals	Apps	Goals
La Roche-sur-Yon	2000–01								
La Roche-sur-Yon	2001–02								
La Roche-sur-Yon	Total								
Montpellier	2002–03	22	12	2	1	0	0	24	13
Montpellier	2003–04	22	7	3	1	0	0	25	8
Montpellier	2004–05	18	5	0	0	9	2	27	7
Montpellier	2005–06	21	12	0	0	5	1	26	13
Montpellier	Total	83	36	5	2	14	3	102	41
Lyon	2006–07	20	9	0	0	0	0	20	9
Lyon	2007–08	21	5	5	3	9	2	35	10
Lyon	2008–09	13	1	0	0	5	1	18	2
Lyon	Total	54	15	5	3	14	3	73	21
Washington Freedom	2009	19	4					19	4
Washington Freedom	2010	22	2					22	2
Washington Freedom	Total	41	6					41	6
Paris Saint-Germain	2009–10	13	10	0	0	0	0	13	10
Lyon	2010–11	19	2	3	0	6	1	28	3
Lyon	2011–12	22	2	4	0	8	2	34	4
Lyon	2012–13	18	0	5	0	9	2	32	2
Lyon	Total	59	4	12	0	51	5	94	9
Career total		250	71	22	5	37	11	309	87

=== International ===
Appearances and goals by national team and year
National team	Year	Apps	Goals
France	1999–2000	3	0
France	2000–01	14	0
France	2001–02	10	0
France	2002–03	13	1
France	2003–04	15	5
France	2004–05	10	0
France	2005–06	13	2
France	2006–07	13	1
France	2007–08	8	1
France	2008–09	5	1
France	2009–10	12	4
France	2010–11	17	2
France	2011–12	23	2
Total		156	19

Goal	Date	Venue	Opponent	Score	Result	Competition
1	23 August 2002	Stade Félix-Bollaert, Lens, France	Denmark	2–0	2–0	2003 FIFA Women's World Cup qualification
2	21 February 2004	Stade de la Mosson, Montpellier, France	Scotland	1–1	6–3	Friendly
3	21 February 2004	Stade de La Mosson, Montpellier, France	Scotland	5–3	6–3	Friendly
4	14 March 2004	Estádio da Nora, Ferreiras, Portugal	United States	5–1	5–1	2004 Algarve Cup
5	16 March 2004	Estádio Municipal, Quarteira, Portugal	Sweden	0–3	0–3	2004 Algarve Cup
6	21 February 2004	Stade Auguste Delaune, Reims, France	Hungary	2–0	6–0	2005 UEFA Women's Championship qualification
7	21 February 2004	Stade Fernand Sastre, Sens, France	Republic of Ireland	3–0	6–0	Friendly
8	22 April 2006	Stadion Eszperantó Út, Dunaújváros, Hungary	Hungary	0–2	0–5	2007 FIFA Women's World Cup qualification
9	22 November 2006	Stade de la Libération, Boulogne-sur-Mer, France	Belgium	4–0	6–0	Friendly
10	23 April 2008	Yiannis Pathiakakis Stadium, Akratitos, Greece	Greece	0–3	0–5	UEFA Women's Euro 2009 qualifying
11	25 April 2009	Colmar Stadium, Colmar, France	Switzerland	1–0	1–0	Friendly
12	24 August 2009	Ratina Stadion, Tampere, Finland	Iceland	1–2	1–3	UEFA Women's Euro 2009
13	25 February 2010	Richman Park, Dublin, Ireland	Republic of Ireland	0–1	1–2	Friendly
14	27 March 2010	Stade de la Libération, Boulogne-sur-Mer, France	Northern Ireland	2–0	6–0	2011 FIFA Women's World Cup qualification
15	31 March 2010	Windsor Park, Belfast, Northern Ireland	Northern Ireland	0–1	0–4	2011 FIFA Women's World Cup qualification
16	15 September 2010	Stadio Pietro Barbetti, Gubbio, Italy	Italy	1–3	2–3	2011 FIFA Women's World Cup qualification
17	13 July 2011	Borussia-Park, Mönchengladbach, Germany	United States	1–1	1–3	2011 FIFA Women's World Cup
18	26 October 2011	Stade de l'Aube, Troyes, France	Israel	2–0	5–0	UEFA Women's Euro 2013 qualifying
19	28 February 2012	GSP Stadium, Nicosia, Cyprus	Switzerland	3–0	3–0	2012 Cyprus Cup

== Managerial statistics ==
As of matches played 21 November 2026

Managerial record by team and tenure
Team	From	To	Record								Ref
Team	From	To	G	W	D	L	GF	GA	GD	Win %	Ref
Lyon (women)	27 April 2021	25 May 2024	118	100	10	8	381	71	+310	84.75	
Chelsea (women)	29 May 2024	present	95	73	14	8	231	71	+160	76.84	
Total			213	173	24	16	612	142	+470	81.22	

== Honours ==
=== Player ===
Montpellier

- Division 1 Féminine: 2003–04, 2004–05
- Coupe de France Féminine: 2005–06

Lyon

- Division 1 Féminine: 2006–07, 2007–08, 2008–09, 2010–11, 2011–12, 2012–13
- Coupe de France Féminine: 2007–08, 2011–12, 2012–13
- UEFA Women's Champions League: 2010–11, 2011–12, runner up: 2012–13

France

- Cyprus Cup: 2012

Individual

- UNFP Female Player of the Year: 2003–04, 2007–08
- WPS Player of the Month: May 2009
- WPS All-Star: 2009, 2010
- FIFA Women's World Cup All-Star Team: 2011

=== Manager ===
Lyon

- Division 1 Féminine: 2021–22, 2022–23, 2023–24
- Coupe de France féminine: 2022–23
- Trophée des Championnes: 2022, 2023
- UEFA Women's Champions League: 2021–22, runner up: 2023–24

Chelsea

- Women's Super League: 2024–25
- Women's FA Cup: 2024–25
- FA Women's League Cup: 2024–25, 2025–26

Individual

- Women's Super League Manager of the Season: 2024–25
- WSL Manager of the Month: September 2024, November 2024, January 2025, September 2025, October 2026

=== Other ===
Orders

- Knight of the National Order of Merit: 2014
