= Laura Kaminski =

English football manager

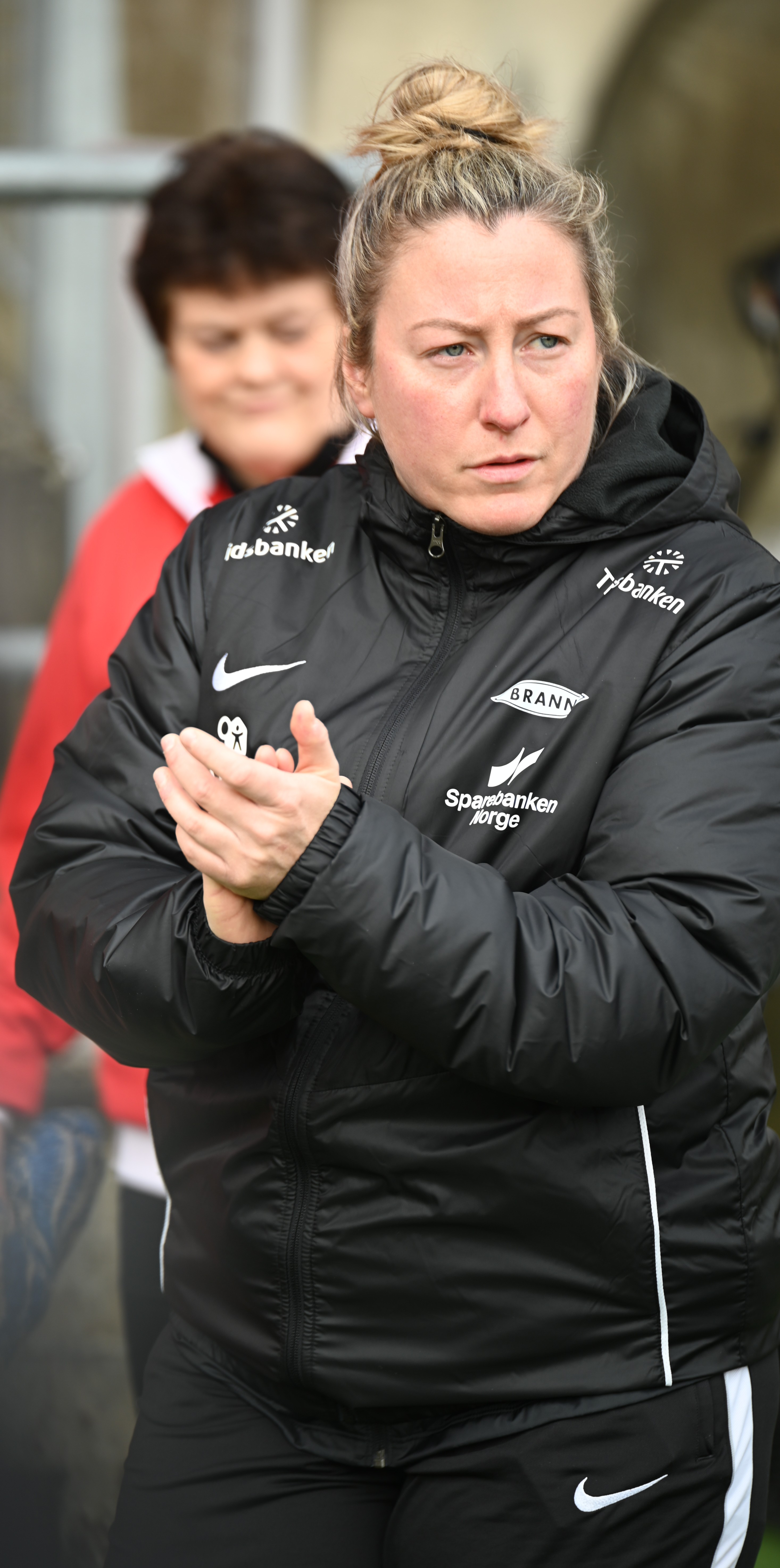

Managerial career
- Years: Team
- 2018–2021: Tottenham Hotspur U21
- 2018–2021: Tottenham Hotspur (assistant)
- 2021–2023: Charlton Athletic (assistant)
- 2023–2025: Crystal Palace
- 2026–: SK Brann

Laura Kaminski is an English football manager who is the current manager of Toppserien club SK Brann.

== Managerial career ==
Kaminski has worked as an assistant manager with women's football clubs for over 15 years, and acquired her UEFA Pro Licence in May 2018.

She spent three seasons with Tottenham Hotspur Women, where she helped Spurs gain promotion to the WSL in the 2018–19 season, and spent five years with the England women's under-19 team. She has also worked as an assistant for Charlton Athletic, Arsenal, Chelsea, Watford, Brighton & Hove Albion, and QPR.

In July 2023, Kaminski was appointed head coach of Crystal Palace, winning promotion to the Women's Super League having won the Women's Championship in the 2023–24 season, with the team scoring 55 goals in 22 matches. On 28 February 2025, Kaminski was sacked with the club sitting bottom of the table with six points from their first fourteen matches.

In January 2026, Kaminski was appointed head coach of SK Brann.

== Managing style ==
Under Kaminski’s leadership, [Crystal Palace] has shown tactical adaptability and moments of promise, combining a solid defensive structure with occasional offensive creativity.

— The Cut Back, December 2024

According to The Cut Back, Kaminski played Palace in a straightforward 3–5–2 formation, allowing the number 10 supporting striker Annabel Blanchard to roam freely around the number 9 area, and score goals with great effective. The team's build up play remained simple, usually involving a long ball from the defensive back line, and otherwise utilised more than other teams in the WSL based on league data.

== Honours ==
Crystal Palace Women

- Women's Championship: 2023–24

Individual

- Women's Championship Manager of the Month: September 2023, February 2024
- League Managers Association Awards Women's Championship Manager of the Season: 2023–24
