= Kelly Cousins =

English football manager (born 1986)

Personal information
- Birth name: Kelly Chambers
- Date of birth: 11 January 1986 (age 40)
- Place of birth: Reading, Berkshire, England

Team information
- Current team: Utah Royals (sporting director)

Youth career
- Reading

Senior career*
Years	Team	Apps	(Gls)
2007–2012	Reading		

Managerial career
- 2015–2023: Reading
- * Club domestic league appearances and goals

Kelly Cousins (née Chambers; born 11 January 1986) is an English women's football manager and former player who serves as sporting director for American club Utah Royals FC of the National Women's Soccer League (NWSL). She previously managed English club Reading of the Women's Super League (WSL) and was also its director of football.

== Playing career ==
Cousins captained Reading in the lower leagues. However, her playing career ended after an anterior cruciate ligament injury in 2012.

== Managerial career ==
During her playing career, Reading appointed Cousins as its director of women's and girls football, and she remained in this role until her departure in 2023.

Originally, Cousins became manager of Reading whilst in the third tier of English football, succeeding Phil Cousins. After gaining promotion to the WSL 2, now known as the Women's Championship, in 2014, the club appointed Jayne Ludlow as manager.

Ludlow guided Reading to a third-place finish in the 2014 WSL 2 season but stepped down at the end of the season to manage the Wales women's national team. Cousins served as manager from that point until her departure in 2023.

Cousins won the 2015 WSL 2 division, earning Reading a promotion to the top flight. Cousins' Reading finished the season, level on points with Doncaster Rovers Belles who also got promoted, but with a goal difference of +46 - four higher than Doncaster who had +42. What made the title victory so impressive, was that it was with a group of players who also had part-time jobs.

Her first season in the WSL, Cousins managed to avoid relegation. Despite only winning one game all season, Reading managed to finish above Doncaster who were relegated.

The 2017–18 WSL season was Reading's highest finish in club history. Cousins secured a fourth-place finish, with a total of 32 points in 18 games.

Cousins failed to recreate the success of that season. Her following two seasons in 2018–19 and 2019–20 both resulted in a fifth-place finish.

In December 2018, Cousins won the November 2018 League Managers Association (LMA) Manager of the Month Award. Victories against Bristol City, Brighton and Hove Albion and Everton, saw Cousins' side take maximum points in November and jump two places in the table.

On 20 June 2023, following the club's relegation out of the Women's Super League, Reading announced that Cousins would leave the club. American club Utah Royals announced that it had hired her to be the club's first sporting director nearly a month later on 18 July.

== Personal life ==
Cousins has a daughter, and as of 20 June 2023 was pregnant with a second child. Her children's father is Phil Cousins, who was Kelly Cousins's predecessor as Reading manager and became the team's head coach during her own tenure as manager. Phil Cousins also resigned from Reading on 26 June 2023. She also attended Whiteknights primary school in Shinfield.

== Managerial statistics ==
As of matches played 27 May 2023

Managerial record by team and tenure
Team	From	To	Record				
Team	From	To	P	W	D	L	Win %
Reading	2015	20 June 2023	195	65	41	89	33.33
Total			195	65	41	89	33.33
