= David Parker (football manager) =

English football manager (born 1984)

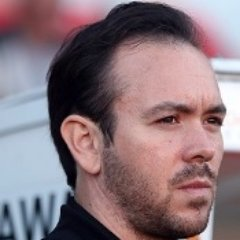

Personal information
- Date of birth: 27 April 1984 (age 42)
- Place of birth: Sutton Coldfield, England
- Height: 1.74 m (5 ft 8 1/2 in)

Team information
- Current team: Birmingham City Ladies

Managerial career
- Years: Team
- 2006–2007: Chicago Fire (Youth)
- 2008–2009: New York Red Bulls (Youth)
- 2009–2017: Birmingham City Ladies (Centre of Excellence)
- 2010–2017: Birmingham City Ladies Reserves
- 2011–2017: Birmingham City Ladies

David Parker (born 27 April 1984) is an English football manager. He was the manager of Birmingham City Ladies in the FA Women's Super League from 2011 to 2017. Aged 26 he became the youngest manager in English football and one of the youngest ever to hold the FA – UEFA A Licence.

== Coaching career ==
Parker completed his UEFA B Licence and published two articles on the football industry; his first explored the motivational techniques of Brian Clough, (2005), "A Report on the Motivational Theories of Brian Clough (1935–2004)", and the second a report investigating football finances, (2005), "Human Resource Accounting in Football Clubs: Comparative Study of Accounting Practices". After returning from a spell coaching in the MLS, he took up a position with Amisco (Prozone) as the Head Performance Analyst.

=== Birmingham City Ladies ===
At the start of the 2011 FA WSL season, Parker was appointed as the Manager after a successful 2010–11 season with the Reserve team, where he led them to the FA Premier League Reserves League Title in his first season in charge.

In 2011 Birmingham City Ladies finished in 2nd-place, qualifiying for a place in the 2012–13 UEFA Women's Champions League round of 32 for the first time in their history.

In May 2012 the Birmingham City Ladies won their first FA Women's Cup, beating Chelsea on penalties in the final at Ashton Gate in Bristol. Also in 2012, for the second consecutive year, the club finished 2nd in the FA WSL and were runners-up in the Continental Cup Final, both to Arsenal. The 2nd-place finish in the league qualified Birmingham for the 2013–14 UEFA Women's Champions League round of 32 for the 2nd season running.

Still competing the UEFA Champions League in 2013/14 season Birmingham qualified for the Quarter Finals for the first time in their history.

In the spring of 2014 Birmingham beat Arsenal 3–0 on aggregate to progress to the Semi Finals of the Champions League and faced Swedish side Tyresö.

Birmingham continued this run in the FAWSL by again almost winning the league for the third time in four seasons.

The 2015 FAWSL season saw a drop of from the previous 4 seasons success, but the team finished 6th.

== Honours and achievements ==
=== Managerial ===
Birmingham City Ladies (2011–2017)

- FA Women's Super League - Manager of the Year: 2014
- UEFA Women's Champions League – Semi Finalists: 2014
- Women's FA Cup – Winner (1): 2012
- FA Women's Super League – Runners Up (2): 2011, 2012
- FA Women's Super League – Top 4 Finish (5): 2011, 2012, 2013, 2014, 2016
- FA WSL Continental Cup – Runners Up (3): 2011, 2012, 2016

Birmingham City Ladies Reserves / Development Squad (2010–2016)

- FA Women's Premier League – Reserve League (1): 2010–11
- FA Women's Super League Development Cup (1): 2014-15

== Managerial statistics ==
As of 3 Jan 2017

Team	From	To	Record						
Team	From	To	G	W	D	L	GF	GA	Win %
Birmingham City Ladies Reserves	27 July 2010	15 May 2011	24	16	1	7	69	38	66.67
Birmingham City Ladies	14 January 2011	12 January 2017	136	71	31	34	219	143	52.21
Total			160	87	32	41	288	181	54.38

=== Individual records ===
- FA WSL 1 Manager of the Year - 2014
- Longest Serving FA WSL 1 Manager
- Record Points Amassed by a Head Coach in FA WSL 1
- Led Birmingham City Ladies to the Highest Ranked British Team in Europe (2014, 2015, 2016)
