= Reading F.C. Women =

Reading FC Women
- Full name: Reading Football Club Women
- Nicknames: The Royals, RFCW
- Founded: 2006; 20 years ago
- Ground: Madejski Stadium, Reading
- Capacity: 2,000
- Owners: Redwood Holdings Limited
- First-team manager: Ed Jackson-Norris
- League: Southern Region Women's Football League Premier Division
- 2025–26: Southern Region Women's Football League Premier Division, 5th of 11
- Website: https://www.readingfc.co.uk/teams/women/
Home colours	Away colours

Reading Football Club Women is an English women's football club affiliated with Reading FC. The club most recently played in the Women's Championship, the second tier of English women's football. Reading F.C. Women previously played in the FA Women's Premier League National Division after being promoted from the FA Women's Premier League Southern Division, which they were relegated to at the end of the 2011–12 season. They had previously won promotion to the National Division from the Southern Division in 2009–10. They gained entry to an expanded FA WSL in 2014.

== History ==
Reading F.C. began an association with women's football when it affiliated with Reading Royals LFC (previously Twyford Comets) in 1988.

In May 2006, Reading ended this affiliation and started their own women's team, Reading F.C. Women. In their first season they achieved a Southern Region Women's Football League and Cup double and were promoted to the South West Combination Women's Football League. They followed this with an unbeaten 2007–08 League season to gain promotion to the Premier League Northern Division (in which they competed due to an overload at the Southern).

After finishing sixth in the Northern Division, Reading were transferred to the Southern Division for the 2009–10 season. In 2010 they won their last four games of the season to finish runners–up to Barnet and secure promotion to the FA Women's Premier League National Division.

On 3 April 2011 Reading successfully defended the Berks and Bucks County Cup trophy, cruising past Milton Keynes Dons 3–0 in the final.

Their first season in the FA Women's Premier League National Division (the second highest league, following the formation of the Women's Super League) saw Reading finish third. In March 2012 Reading lost top goalscorer Nikki Watts to WSL club Bristol Academy. They finished 9th in the National Division in the 2011–12 season, resulting in their relegation back to the Southern Division for 2012–13.

In 2012–13 Reading FC Women won the FA Premier League Southern Division by eight points and a goal difference of 41, while both the first and reserve team retained the County Cup.

Reading's top scorer in 2012–13, Fran Kirby, was rewarded for her campaign by being named as Player of the Season – as well as receiving a call up to play for Great Britain in the World University Games in Kazan, Russia. Striker Kirby surpassed the 30-goal mark this season and was also selected for an England under-23s Camp.

Reading were granted a licence to play in the FA Women's Super League 2 from 2014. They won the division in the 2015 season and were promoted to the FA WSL. On 10 December 2015 it was announced that Reading would play their home games at Adams Park, the home of Wycombe Wanderers F.C., for the next two seasons.

Reading finished the 2017–18 season in 4th place and 5th in both 2018–19 and 2019–20, reaching the Semi-Final of the FA Women's Cup in 2018–19. The side finished 7th in the 2020–21 season, continuing the steady decline to 8th in 2021–22.

Reading were relegated from the WSL on the final day of the 2022–23 season, losing to Chelsea. Following their relegation, Reading switched to operation on a part-time basis in the 2023–24 Women's Championship.. The following year they lost the support of the parent Reading FC during a period of intense financial pressure under the ownership of Dai Yongge. They were evicted from the mens' Bearwood training ground and Majeski stadium with home matches played at Arbour Park stadium in Slough. The club were adopted by the Reading FC Supporters Trust and after negotiations with the FA, withdrew from the FA Women's Championship and re-entered the league in the fifth tier in the Southern Region Women’s Football League, Premier Div.

On 11 June 2026, Reading returned to the Reading F.C. umbrella ahead of the 2026/27 season, with the first teaming returning to train at Bearwood Park, and play selected games at the Madejski Stadium.

== Stadium ==
In August 2024, following their demotion to the Southern Region Women's Football League, Reading announced that they would now be playing their home games at Slough Town's Arbour Park, having previously played at the Madejski Stadium (rebranded as the Select Car Leasing Stadium from 2021) from the start of the 2020–21 FA WSL season. Before then, they played at Rushmoor Community Stadium in Farnborough, Hampshire before moving to Adams Park in High Wycombe, Buckinghamshire. The club moved there after they gained promotion to the FA WSL in 2015. As of the 2026/27 season, it was announced that Reading Women would return to playing their home fixtures at the Select Car Leasing Stadium.

== Management ==
From 2015, Reading F.C. Women Director of Women's and Girls' Football and First Team Manager was former captain of Reading F.C. Women, Kelly Chambers. Chambers took over from former manager Jayne Ludlow who stepped down to manage Wales. She was assisted by Head Coach Phil Cousins. Both Chambers and Cousins left their respective roles in June 2023.

On 18 August 2023, Reading announced Liam Gilbert as their new First Team Manager. The first team finished 10th in the Championship in the 2023-24 season, one place (six points) above the relegation zone. In June 2024, before the start of the following season and after a failed takeover bid for the club, Reading asked to withdraw from the Women’s Championship due to continuing financial difficulties. Sell Before We Dai, a fan group calling for an owner change at Reading, described the withdrawal from the Women’s Championship as "an absolute disgrace".

On 14 August 2024, Reading announced Pedro Bruno as their new First Team Manager. On 24 June 2025, Reading announced that Pedro Bruno and assistant manager Shelley Strange had left the club. On 4 July 2025, Reading announced the appointment of Ed Jackson-Norris as their new First Team Manager.

=== History ===
Dates	Name
2013–2014	(Wales) Jayne Ludlow
2015–2023	(England) Kelly Chambers
2023–2024	(England) Liam Gilbert
2024–2025	Pedro Bruno
2025–	(England) Ed Jackson-Norris

== Players ==
=== Current squad ===
As of 9 October 2026

Note: Flags indicate national team as defined under FIFA eligibility rules; some limited exceptions apply. Players may hold more than one non-FIFA nationality.

No.	Pos.	Nation	Player
1	GK	ENG	Sophie Butler
2	DF	ENG	Poppy Whitburn
3	DF	ENG	Bethan Poole
4	DF	TAN	Keziah Banduka
5	DF	ENG	Sarah Thompson
6	DF	ENG	Lara Moore
7	FW	ENG	Sophie Bishop
8	MF	ENG	Freya Morgan
9	FW	ENG	Natalie Cowell (Player/Coach)
10	MF	ENG	Ellie Szekeres
11	MF	ENG	Mia Parker (captain)
12	MF	ENG	Ellie Luscombe
13	GK	ENG	Scarlett Bowcott

No.	Pos.	Nation	Player
14	FW	TAN	Keren Banduka
15	FW	ENG	Alice Curr
16	MF	ENG	Martha Riley
17	FW	ENG	Ava Broke-Smith
18	FW	ENG	Tia Johnson
19	FW	ENG	Leah Why
20	FW	HUN	Bogi Tramontini
21	FW	ENG	Georgia Hayes
22	MF	ENG	Jazz King
23	DF	ENG	Ellie Manners
24	MF	ENG	Tarran Williams
25	FW	ENG	Macey-Nikiah Walters

== Honours ==
- FA WSL 2:
  - Winners (1): 2015
- South West Combination Women's Football League:
  - Winners (1): 2007–08
- FA Women's Premier League Southern Division:
  - Winners (1): 2012–13
