= Emma Hayes =

English football manager (born 1976)

Emma Hayes OBE
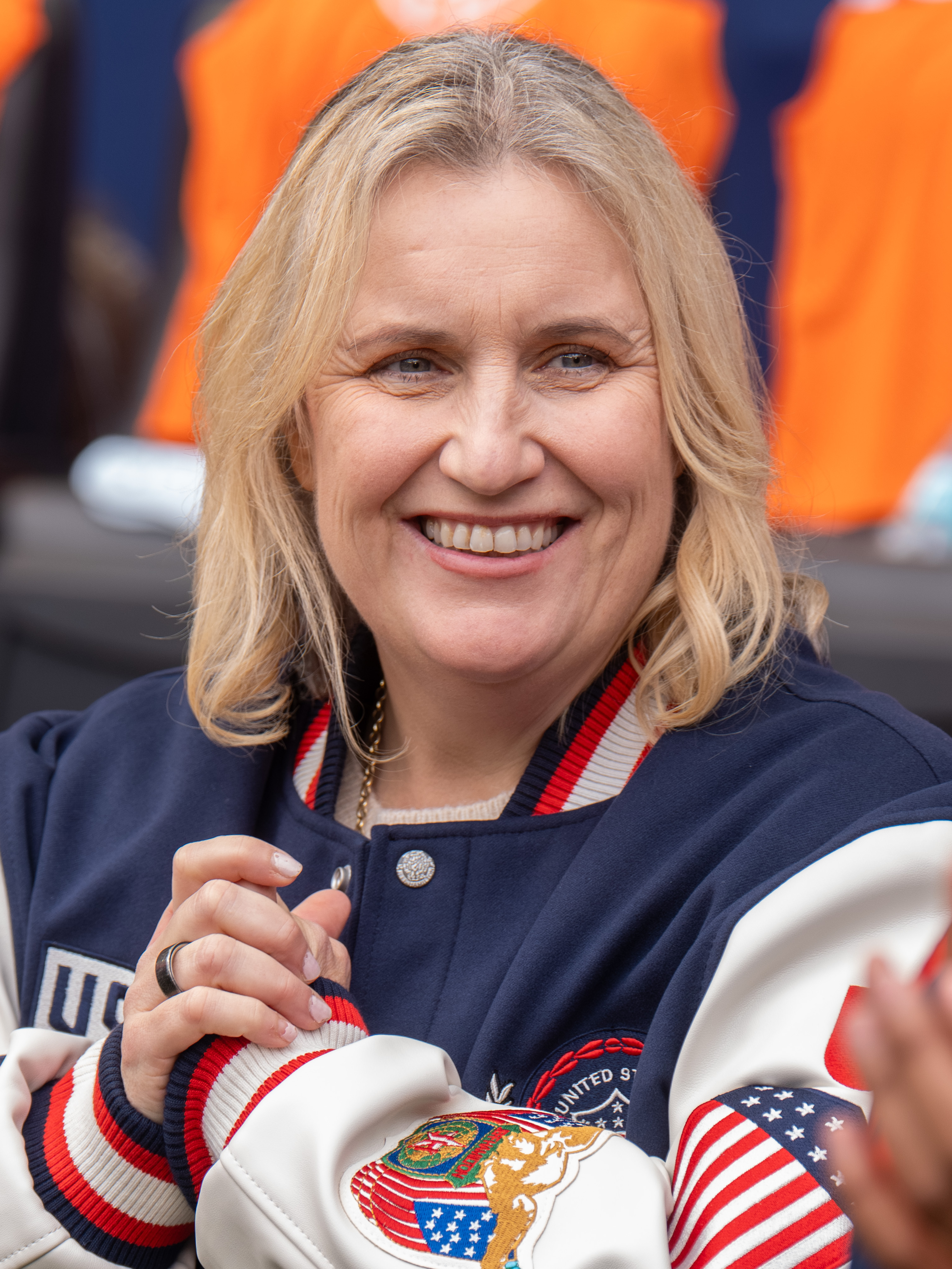
- Hayes with United States in 2026

Personal information
- Full name: Emma Carol Hayes
- Date of birth: 18 October 1976 (age 50)
- Place of birth: Camden, London, England
- Position: Midfielder

Team information
- Current team: United States (head coach)

Youth career
- Years: Team
- 1988–1996: Arsenal

Managerial career
- 2002: Long Island Lady Riders
- 2003–2005: Iona Gaels
- 2005–2008: Arsenal (assistant)
- 2008–2010: Chicago Red Stars
- 2012–2024: Chelsea
- 2024–: United States
Medal record
Women's football
Representing United States (as manager)
Summer Olympics
Winner	2024 Paris

Emma Carol Hayes OBE (born 18 October 1976) is an English professional football manager who is the head coach of the United States women's national team. She was previously manager of Chelsea Women from 2012 to 2024, winning seven Women's Super League titles, including five consecutively from 2020 to 2024. In 2024, she led the United States to a gold medal at the Paris Olympics. She was awarded the inaugural Women's Johan Cruyff Trophy that year as the best coach in the women's game.

== Early life ==
Hayes was born in Camden, London, and attended Parliament Hill School. She played for Arsenal's academy as a midfielder from 1988 to 1996, but an ankle injury while on a ski trip when she was 17 ultimately ended her playing career. With football ruled out, Hayes studied European studies, Spanish, and sociology at Liverpool Hope University College and later read for a master's degree in intelligence and international affairs.

== Career ==
While at Liverpool Hope, Hayes coached the women's football team from 1997 to 1999. In 1999, she moved back to London, helping develop youth players at Croydon and Crystal Palace. In 2002, she became the manager of the Long Island Lady Riders on Long Island, New York, becoming the youngest coach in the league. In the USL W-League, she led the team to finish first in the Northeast Division of the Eastern Conference, and was named as the league's coach of the season. The team won their conference semi-final match 3–1 against the New York Magic, before losing 4–2 in the conference championship against the Boston Renegades. She was appointed as the head coach for the Iona Gaels women's team, of Iona College in New Rochelle, New York, on 22 January 2003, where she remained until the end of the 2005 season.

She returned to England to become the assistant first team coach for Arsenal Ladies over 3 seasons between 2005 and 2008, during which time the team won 11 major trophies including three Women's Premier League titles, three FA Women's Cups and the UEFA Women's Cup. At the same time, she was also the club's Academy director, overseeing the development of young players.

Hayes joined the Chicago Red Stars of Women's Professional Soccer as a manager on 15 May 2008. After she was sacked in 2010, she took up a technical director role at Western New York Flash and advised them on transfers, helping to create a team that won the 2011 Women's Professional Soccer championship. After another stint as a consultant for Washington Freedom, Hayes returned to London and worked for the family business, Covent Garden FX, a currency exchange.

=== Chelsea ===
During the mid-season 2012 Summer Olympics break on 14 August 2012, Chelsea hired Hayes as manager for the remainder of the 2012 season following the resignation of Matt Beard to become manager at Liverpool. Hayes managed her first match with Chelsea on 18 August 2012 in a 1–0 win at Doncaster Rovers Belles.

==== 2015 season ====
After narrowly missing out on the 2014 FA WSL 1 title on the final day, Hayes oversaw a huge squad overhaul that bore witness to the addition of several arrivals. Swedish shot-stopper Hedvig Lindahl and promising England centre-half Millie Bright were among the new recruits. Marija Banusic, Gemma Davison and Niamh Fahey also joined Chelsea, signing from Kristianstads, Liverpool Ladies and Arsenal Ladies respectively. Later on in the season, Hayes won the race for Reading and England forward Fran Kirby for a British record fee. With the agonising memories of final-day defeat still fresh in memory, Hayes guided her side to a historic league and cup double, edging the FA Cup Final thanks to a lone strike from Ji So-yun late on in the first half. Later on in the season, they avenged themselves by winning the FA WSL 1 title, after hammering Sunderland at home 4–0 to secure the trophy.

In the Women's Champions League, Hayes's side reached the last 16 after defeating Glasgow City. After their 2–1 home defeat by VfL Wolfsburg, Hayes criticised The Football Association for poor fixture scheduling, insisting that the competition is "geared to French, German and Swedish teams, and until we change that or listen to clubs like Chelsea we are always going to get knocked out in the early rounds."

==== 2016–17 season ====
"[Hayes] built everything at Chelsea – from having the kit washed to having food, to having our own building, to having our own training and pitches. Now, it’s an absolute professional setup but everything's been a fight over the years to do that."

— Katie Chapman, who played under Hayes at three different clubs, credits her with building Chelsea from the ground-up.

Hayes' side finished second in The FA WSL 1, five points adrift of Champions Manchester City. The Blues also reached the FA Cup Final for the second consecutive year, losing 1–0 to a strong Arsenal side. Chelsea however won the FA WSL Spring Series, an interim edition of the FA WSL. Hayes led the side to first place, finishing on the same points as Manchester City but beating them on goal difference.

==== 2017–18 season ====
Aided with the addition of new players including Ramona Bachmann, Maren Mjelde, Erin Cuthbert and Crystal Dunn, Emma Hayes guided her side to finish top, in a reorganised FA WSL1, on goal difference.

The team also played the FA Cup competitions and reached the semi-final but were knocked out by Birmingham City in a penalty shoot-out.

==== 2019–20 and 2020–21 seasons ====
I enjoy representing a club I absolutely adore. To be in a position where we can continue to win on behalf of Chelsea is something I think I was born for.

— Hayes, reflecting on her success at Chelsea.

Hayes sought to rebuild the team at the conclusion of the 2017–18 season around new recruits Sam Kerr, Pernille Harder, Melanie Leupolz, Magda Eriksson, and Ann Katrin Berger, having moved on some key first-team players. The 2019–20 and 2020–21 season saw her team win back-to-back WSL titles in what were record breaking years, following a trophy-less 2018–19 campaign. Given Chelsea's dominance in the 2020–21 season in both Europe and England, some observers hailed them as one of the best teams ever. Hayes became the first woman manager to reach the Champions League final in 12 years. On 16 May, her Chelsea team, also playing their first-ever Champions League final, lost 4–0 to Barcelona Femeni.

Hayes won the 2020–21 FA WSL Manager of the Season award. Two months later, she signed a new long-term contract with Chelsea. In the same year, Hayes was inducted into the FA WSL Hall of Fame. Based on the 2020–21 season, on 17 January 2022, she was adjudged The Best FIFA Football Coach, beating off competition from Lluís Cortés and Sarina Wiegman.

==== 2023–24 season ====
On 4 November 2023, Chelsea officially announced Hayes would depart after the ongoing season to “pursue a new opportunity outside of the WSL and club football.” Reports in the United States indicated that Hayes was in advanced talks to become the new manager of the United States women's national team. On 14 November 2023, Hayes was named Head Coach of the United States women's national team starting at the conclusion of the WSL season. On 21 January 2024, Hayes became the first woman to win the Football Writers Association Tribute Award in its 42 year history.

Chelsea lost to Arsenal 1–0 after extra time at the FA Women's League Cup final. After the match, Hayes was seen to have shoved Arsenal head coach Jonas Eidevall as they shook hands. Hayes claimed it was due to Eidevall's "unacceptable male aggression" on the touchline after an altercation with Erin Cuthbert during the match. Chelsea went on to crash out of the Women's FA Cup and UEFA Women's Champions League in the semi-final stages but ultimately won a fifth WSL title in a row to send Hayes out on a high.

=== United States ===
In November 2023, Hayes was named head coach of the United States women's national team (USWNT) starting at the conclusion of the WSL season. She began her tenure in May 2024 with only two months to prepare for the Olympics. On 1 June, in the team's debut under Hayes and the first of four friendlies before the Olympics, the United States won 4–0 against South Korea. Despite the short time she had with the team, she took them through an undefeated Olympics run, winning the gold medal game 1–0 against Brazil on 10 August. The team went 6–0 and scored its opponents 12–2 at the tournament. On 28 October, she was awarded the inaugural Women's Johan Cruyff Trophy as the best coach in the women's game.

Before the next major tournament cycle, Hayes introduced the "WNT Way", a plan to develop the women's game in the United States through a unique "female lens". Hayes saw her first loss with the USWNT on 26 February 2025, dropping 2–1 to Japan at the 2025 SheBelieves Cup. She has broadened the USWNT player pool during her tenure, giving 17 players their USWNT debuts in her first 20 games, the most by a new manager since the early days of the program.

== Personal life ==
In 2018, Hayes was pregnant with twins, but lost one of them 28 weeks in. She gave birth to the surviving twin on 17 May 2018.

Hayes credits Vic Akers, former Arsenal W.F.C. manager under whom she was part of the backroom staff when they won an unprecedented quadruple in the 2006–07 season, for being a "massive" influence on her career. Speaking of her experience coaching in the United States she said though she was born in England, she was "definitely made in America." In 2023, Hayes co-wrote a book, Kill The Unicorn, which discusses high-performance management and argues that the perception of a single great leader is a myth.

Chelsea forward Fran Kirby, who suffered from severe depression after the loss of her mother early in her life and from a career-threatening illness in her late 20s, is particularly close to Hayes. Speaking of Hayes's positive influence in her life she said, "Emma's been incredible. She's been my rock; the person who made sure I was protected from everything." Former Chelsea and England player, Karen Carney, also praised Hayes for being there when she felt the most vulnerable and isolated.

Hayes was appointed Member of the Order of the British Empire (MBE) in the 2016 Birthday Honours, and was appointed Officer of the Order of the British Empire (OBE) in the 2022 New Year Honours, both for services to association football.

She is a Tottenham Hotspur fan.

== Managerial statistics ==
As of 13 October 2026

All competitive league, cup and international games are counted.

Managerial record by team and tenure
Team	From	To	Record					Ref
Team	From	To	G	W	D	L	Win %	Ref
Long Island Lady Riders	November 2001	22 January 2003	16	12	0	4	75.00	
Iona Gaels	22 January 2003	28 October 2005	57	22	6	29	38.60	
Chicago Red Stars	15 May 2008	24 May 2010	26	6	6	14	23.08	
Chelsea (Note: Statistics include the 2013 International Women's Club Championship, which was organised as an official competition by the Japan Football Association and Nadeshiko League.)	4 August 2012	18 May 2024	367	261	42	64	71.12	
United States	18 May 2024	Present	42	33	3	6	78.57	
Career total			508	334	57	117	65.75	

== Honours ==
Chelsea Women

- FA Women's Super League: 2015, 2017–18, 2019–20, 2020–21, 2021–22, 2022–23, 2023–24
- FA WSL Spring Series: 2017
- Women's FA Cup: 2014–15, 2017–18, 2020–21, 2021–22, 2022–23
- FA Women's League Cup: 2019–20, 2020–21
- Women's FA Community Shield: 2020
- UEFA Women's Champions League runner up: 2020–21

United States

- Summer Olympic Games gold medal: 2024

Individual

- FA WSL Manager of the Season: 2015, 2018, 2020, 2021, 2022, 2023
- LMA WSL Manager of the Season: 2017–18, 2019–20, 2020–21, 2021–22, 2022–23
- FA WSL Manager of the Month: October 2019, January 2020, February 2020, January 2021, March 2022, November 2022, January 2024
- Women's Super League Hall of Fame: 2021
- The Best FIFA Football Coach: 2021
- FWA Tribute Award: 2024
- Women's Johan Cruyff Trophy: 2024
- IFFHS World's Best Woman National Coach: 2024
- PFA Merit Award: 2025
- English Football Hall of Fame: 2025

Orders

- Officer of the Order of the British Empire (OBE): 2022
- Member of the Order of the British Empire (MBE): 2016
