= 2019–20 FA WSL =

Ninth season of the top English women's association football league

FA WSL
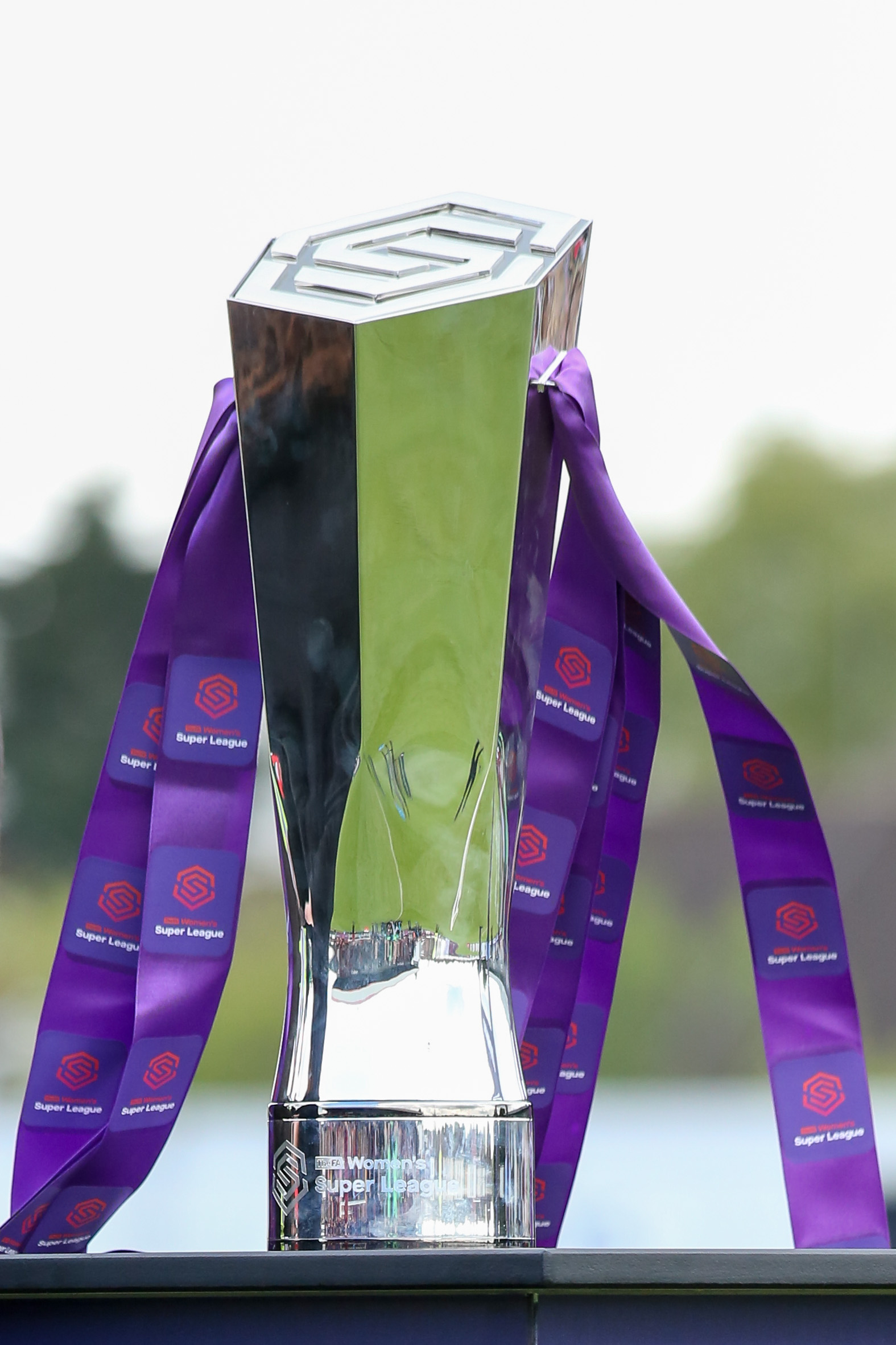
- FA WSL trophy
- Season: 2019–20
- Dates: 7 September 2019 – 5 June 2020
- Champions: Chelsea; 3rd title
- Relegated: Liverpool
- Champions League: Chelsea; Manchester City
- Matches: 87
- Goals: 259 (2.98 per match)
- Top goalscorer: Vivianne Miedema (16 goals)
- Biggest home win: Arsenal 11–1 Bristol City (1 December 2019)
- Biggest away win: Birmingham City 0–6 Chelsea (24 November 2019)
- Highest scoring: Arsenal 11–1 Bristol City (1 December 2019)
- Highest attendance: 38,262 – Tottenham Hotspur 0–2 Arsenal (17 November 2019)

The 2019–20 FA WSL season (also known as the Barclays FA Women's Super League for sponsorship reasons) was the ninth edition of the FA Women's Super League (WSL) since it was formed in 2010. It was the second season after the rebranding of the four highest levels in English women's football and the twelve teams contesting the season was the greatest number in the league's history to date, following a steady increase from the original eight. It is the first under the new Barclays title sponsorship following a landmark multi-million pound investment.

On 13 March 2020, in line with the FA's response to the coronavirus pandemic, it was announced the season was initially suspended until at least 3 April 2020. After further postponements, the season was ultimately ended prematurely on 25 May 2020 with immediate effect. On 5 June 2020, Chelsea were named as champions, moving them up one place ahead of Manchester City on sporting merit after The FA Board's decision to award places on a points-per-game basis. Manchester City were awarded the second Champions League place and Liverpool were relegated using the same method.

This result also confirmed the two teams for the 2020 Women's Community Shield. However, Manchester City were allowed to enter as the current holders of the Women's FA Cup (the 2020 final didn't happen until October) rather than the league runners up.

== Teams ==
After the WSL's restructure going into the 2018–19 season, membership of the league returned solely to performance in the previous season, though the league expanded from eleven teams to twelve as Manchester United and Tottenham Hotspur were both promoted after finishing first and second respectively in the Championship during the 2018–19 season, while only Yeovil Town were relegated.

Locations of the 2019–20 FA WSL teams

Team	Location	Ground	Capacity	2018–19 season
Arsenal	Borehamwood	Meadow Park	4,502	1st
Birmingham City	Solihull	Damson Park	3,050	4th
Brighton & Hove Albion	Crawley	Broadfield Stadium (Note: Match v Birmingham City moved to Falmer Stadium)	6,134	9th
Bristol City	Filton	Stoke Gifford Stadium (Note: Opening weekend match v Brighton & Hove Albion held at Ashton Gate)	1,500	6th
Chelsea	Kingston upon Thames	Kingsmeadow (Note: Match v Tottenham Hotspur held at Stamford Bridge)	4,850	3rd
Everton	Liverpool	Walton Hall Park (Note: Opening six home fixtures played at Haig Avenue)	2,200	10th
Liverpool	Birkenhead	Prenton Park (Note: Merseyside derby held at Anfield)	16,587	8th
Manchester City	Manchester	Academy Stadium (Note: Manchester derby held at City of Manchester Stadium)	7,000	2nd
Manchester United	Leigh	Leigh Sports Village	12,000	WC, 1st
Reading	High Wycombe	Adams Park (Note: Match v Bristol City moved to Madjeski Stadium)	9,617	5th
Tottenham Hotspur	Canons Park	The Hive Stadium (Note: North London derby held at Tottenham Hotspur Stadium)	6,500	WC, 2nd
West Ham United	Romford	Rush Green Stadium (Note: Match v Tottenham Hotspur moved to London Stadium)	3,000	7th

=== Stadium changes ===
In response to the record viewing figures during the 2019 FIFA Women's World Cup, three select fixtures were initially moved to Premier League grounds: The Manchester derby at the City of Manchester Stadium, Chelsea v Tottenham at Stamford Bridge and the North London derby at Tottenham Hotspur Stadium. In total, eight of the twelve teams have moved FA WSL fixtures to the larger grounds of their men's affiliate teams: Bristol City later announced their opening game would be played at Ashton Gate, Reading moved one of their league fixtures (as well as all three League Cup games) to the Madjeski Stadium and West Ham announced they would host Spurs at the London Stadium. Brighton & Hove Albion moved their match against Birmingham to the Falmer Stadium to coincide with the FA's Women's Football Weekend, held during a men's international break. Liverpool later moved their Merseyside derby, held on the same weekend, to Anfield and Everton scheduled the reverse fixture in February at Goodison Park (the match was ultimately left unplayed when the season was suspended and then cancelled).

After originally planning to permanently relocate to their new Walton Hall Park stadium in October 2019 following their opening two home games, delays meant Everton had to postpone the move until February 2020 and eventually scheduled six of their 11 home league games at Haig Avenue in Southport.

=== Personnel and kits ===
As of 23 February 2020

Team	Manager	Captain	Kit manufacturer	Shirt sponsor
Arsenal	(Australia) Joe Montemurro	(Scotland) Kim Little	Adidas	Fly Emirates
Birmingham City	(England) Charlie Baxter (interim)	(England) Kerys Harrop	Adidas	Maple from Canada
Brighton & Hove Albion	(England) Hope Powell	(England) Danielle Buet	Nike	American Express
Bristol City	(Australia) Tanya Oxtoby	(Wales) Loren Dykes	Bristol Sport	Yeo Valley
Chelsea	(England) Emma Hayes	(Sweden) Magdalena Eriksson	Nike	Yokohama Tyres
Everton	(Scotland) Willie Kirk	(England) Danielle Turner	Umbro	SportPesa
Liverpool	(England) Vicky Jepson	(England) Sophie Bradley-Auckland	New Balance	BetVictor
Manchester City	(Republic of Ireland) Alan Mahon (interim)	(England) Steph Houghton	Puma	Etihad Airways
Manchester United	(England) Casey Stoney	(England) Katie Zelem	Adidas	Chevrolet
Reading	(England) Kelly Chambers	(Wales) Natasha Harding	Macron	YLD
Tottenham Hotspur	(England) Karen Hills (Spain) Juan Carlos Amorós	(England) Jenna Schillaci	Nike	AIA
West Ham United	(England) Matt Beard	(England) Gilly Flaherty	Umbro	Betway

=== Managerial changes ===
Team	Outgoing manager	Manner of departure	Date of vacancy	Position in table	Incoming manager	Date of appointment
Manchester City	(England) Nick Cushing	Signed with New York City FC	2 February 2020	1st	(Republic of Ireland) Alan Mahon (interim)	3 February 2020
Birmingham City	(Spain) Marta Tejedor	Mutual separation	3 March 2020	11th	(England) Charlie Baxter (interim)	3 March 2020

== League table ==
Pos	Team	Pld	W	D	L	GF	GA	GD	Pts	PPG	Qualification
1	Chelsea (C)	15	12	3	0	47	11	+36	39	2.60	Qualification for the Champions League knockout phase
2	Manchester City	16	13	1	2	39	9	+30	40	2.50	Qualification for the Champions League knockout phase
3	Arsenal	15	12	0	3	40	13	+27	36	2.40	
4	Manchester United	14	7	2	5	24	12	+12	23	1.64	
5	Reading	14	6	3	5	21	24	−3	21	1.50	
6	Everton	14	6	1	7	21	21	0	19	1.36	
7	Tottenham Hotspur	15	6	2	7	15	24	−9	20	1.33	
8	West Ham United	14	5	1	8	19	34	−15	16	1.14	
9	Brighton & Hove Albion	16	3	4	9	11	30	−19	13	0.81	
10	Bristol City	14	2	3	9	9	38	−29	9	0.64	
11	Birmingham City	13	2	1	10	5	23	−18	7	0.54	
12	Liverpool (R)	14	1	3	10	8	20	−12	6	0.43	Relegation to the Championship

Source: FA WSL, BBC
Rules for classification: Initially: 1) Points; 2) Goal difference; 3) Number of goals scored. After abandonment of season: 1) Points per game
(C) Champions; (R) Relegated

== Results ==
Home \ Away	ARS	BIR	BHA	BRI	CHE	EVE	LIV	MCI	MNU	REA	TOT	WHU
Arsenal	—	2–0	4–0	11–1	1–4	–	1–0	1–0	–	–	–	2–1
Birmingham City	–	—	–	0–1	0–6	0–1	2–0	0–2	–	–	1–1	–
Brighton & Hove Albion	0–4	3–0	—	–	1–1	1–0	1–0	–	1–1	2–2	0–1	1–3
Bristol City	–	0–2	0–0	—	0–4	–	0–1	0–5	–	–	1–2	–
Chelsea	2–1	2–0	–	6–1	—	–	–	2–1	1–0	3–1	1–0	8–0
Everton	1–3	–	2–0	2–0	–	—	–	0–1	2–3	3–1	3–1	–
Liverpool	2–3	–	–	1–1	1–1	0–1	—	–	–	0–1	–	1–1
Manchester City	2–1	3–0	5–0	1–0	3–3	3–1	1–0	—	1–0	–	–	5–0
Manchester United	0–1	–	4–0	0–1	–	3–1	2–0	–	—	2–0	3–0	–
Reading	0–3	1–0	–	3–3	–	3–2	–	0–2	1–1	—	3–1	2–0
Tottenham Hotspur	0–2	–	1–0	–	–	2–2	1–0	1–4	0–3	–	—	2–1
West Ham United	–	1–0	2–1	–	1–3	–	4–2	–	3–2	2–3	0–2	—

Source: The FA
Legend: Blue = home team win; Yellow = draw; Red = away team win.

== Season statistics ==
As of 23 February 2020

=== Top scorers ===
Rank	Player	Club	Goals
1	(Netherlands) Vivianne Miedema	Arsenal	16
2	Bethany England	Chelsea	14
3	(Germany) Pauline Bremer	Manchester City	10
4	(England) Chloe Kelly	Everton	9
5	(England) Lauren James	Manchester United	6
5	(South Korea) Ji So-Yun	Chelsea	6
5	(England) Ellen White	Manchester City	6
8	(Netherlands) Daniëlle van de Donk	Arsenal	5
8	(Northern Ireland) Rachel Furness	Liverpool	5
8	(England) Lauren Hemp	Manchester City	5
8	(Canada) Adriana Leon	West Ham United	5
8	(Scotland) Kim Little	Arsenal	5
8	(England) Jordan Nobbs	Arsenal	5
8	(Norway) Guro Reiten	Chelsea	5
8	(England) Ebony Salmon	Bristol City	5
8	(England) Aileen Whelan	Brighton & Hove Albion	5
8	(England) Fara Williams	Reading	5
8	(England) Katie Zelem	Manchester United	5

=== Clean sheets ===
Rank	Player	Club	Clean sheets
1	(England) Ellie Roebuck	Manchester City	10
2	(Austria) Manuela Zinsberger	Arsenal	6
3	(England) Mary Earps	Manchester United	5
4	(Germany) Ann-Katrin Berger	Chelsea	4
4	(Finland) Tinja-Riikka Korpela	Everton	4
4	(Jamaica) Becky Spencer	Tottenham Hotspur	4
4	(Republic of Ireland) Megan Walsh	Brighton & Hove Albion	4
8	(England) Sophie Baggaley	Bristol City	3
9	(England) Hannah Hampton	Birmingham City	2
9	(England) Rachael Laws	Reading	2
9	(France) Pauline Peyraud-Magnin	Arsenal	2
9	(England) Carly Telford	Chelsea	2

=== Records ===
The match between Arsenal and Bristol City on 1 December 2019 ended 11–1, setting a new WSL record scoreline, surpassing the 9–0 win of Liverpool Ladies over Doncaster Rovers Belles in 2013.

== Awards ==
=== Monthly awards ===
Month	Manager of the Month		Player of the Month		Ref.
Month	Manager	Club	Player	Club	Ref.
September	(England) Karen Hills (Spain) Juan Amorós	Tottenham Hotspur	(England) Chloe Kelly	Everton	
October	(England) Emma Hayes	Chelsea	(Scotland) Kirsty Hanson	Manchester United	
November	(Scotland) Willie Kirk	Everton	(England) Millie Bright	Chelsea	
December	(Australia) Joe Montemurro	Arsenal	(Netherlands) Vivianne Miedema	Arsenal	
January	(England) Emma Hayes	Chelsea	Bethany England	Chelsea	
February	(England) Emma Hayes	Chelsea	Bethany England	Chelsea	

=== Annual awards ===
Award	Winner	Club
Barclays FA WSL Player of the Season	Bethany England	Chelsea
Barclays FA WSL Manager of the Season	(England) Emma Hayes	Chelsea
PFA Players' Player of the Year	Bethany England	Chelsea
PFA Young Player of the Year	(England) Lauren Hemp	Manchester City
FWA Footballer of the Year	(Netherlands) Vivianne Miedema	Arsenal

PFA Team of the Year
Goalkeeper	(Germany) Ann-Katrin Berger (Chelsea)			
Defenders	(Norway) Maren Mjelde (Chelsea)	(England) Leah Williamson (Arsenal)	(England) Millie Bright (Chelsea)	(Sweden) Magdalena Eriksson (Chelsea)
Midfielders	(Scotland) Caroline Weir (Manchester City)		(Scotland) Kim Little (Arsenal)	(South Korea) Ji So-yun (Chelsea)
Forwards	Bethany England (Chelsea)		(Netherlands) Vivianne Miedema (Arsenal)	(England) Chloe Kelly (Everton)

== Prize money ==
An FA WSL prize fund was put in place for the first time, following the new Barclay's sponsorship deal, with the entire pot totaling £500,000. The money was awarded in decreasing increments with the champions winning £100,000 and the last placed team being awarded £6,000.

Finish	Prize money
1st	£100,000
2nd	£67,000
3rd	£60,000
4th	£55,000
5th	£49,000
6th	£43,000
7th	£36,000
8th	£30,000
9th	£24,000
10th	£18,000
11th	£12,000
12th	£6,000

== See also ==
- 2019–20 FA Women's League Cup
- 2019–20 FA Women's Championship (tier 2)
- 2019–20 FA Women's National League (tier 3 & 4)
