= Nick Cushing =

English football manager

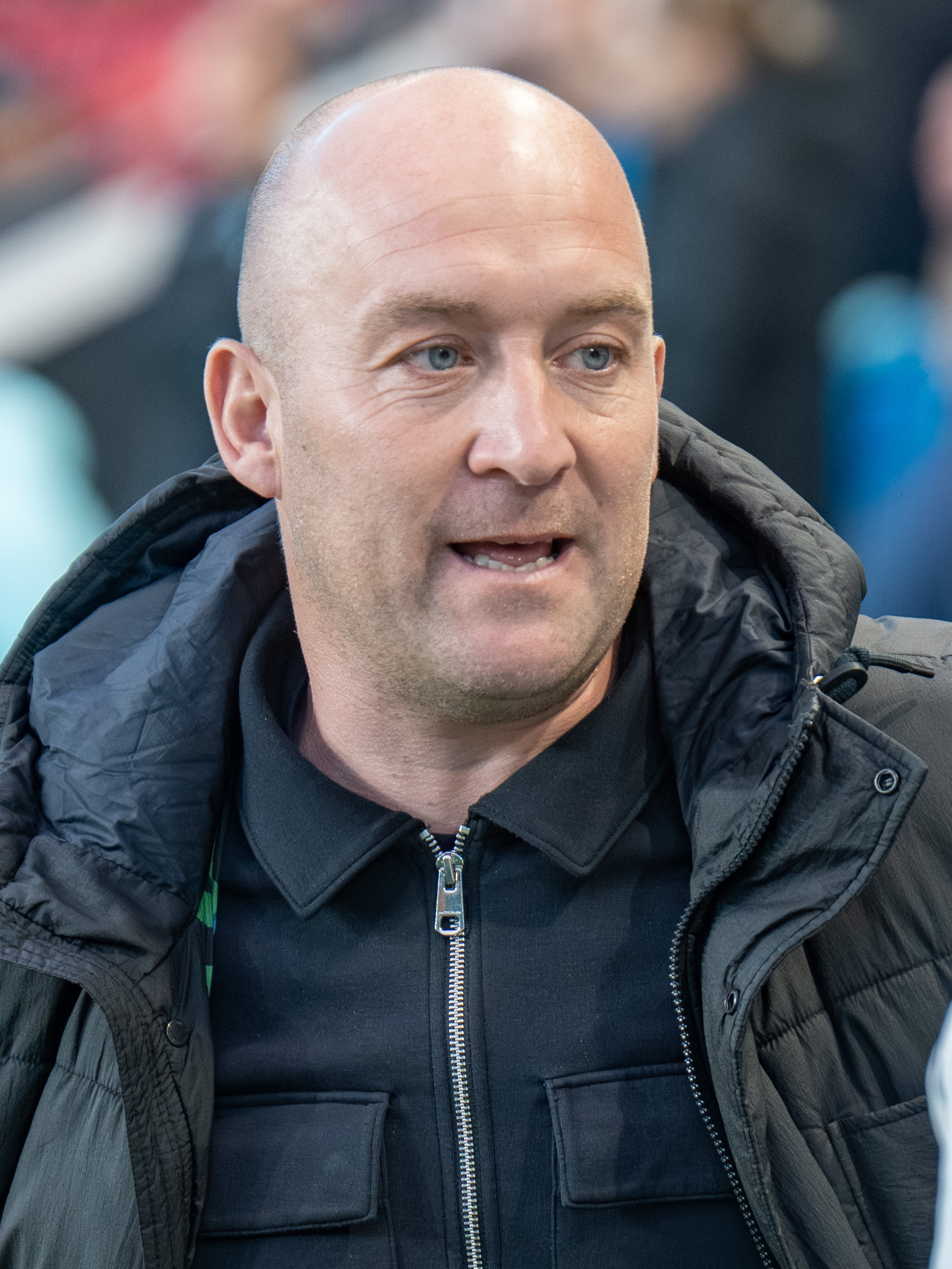
- Cushing with the Denver Summit in 2026

Personal information
- Full name: Nicholas Cushing
- Date of birth: 9 November 1984 (age 41)
- Place of birth: Chester, England

Managerial career
- Years: Team
- 2013–2020: Manchester City Women
- 2022–2024: New York City FC
- 2025: Manchester City Women (interim)
- 2026–: Denver Summit

Nicholas Cushing (/ˈkʊʃɪŋ/ KUUSH-ing; born 9 November 1984) is an English football manager who is currently the head coach of Denver Summit FC of the National Women's Soccer League (NWSL).

== Career ==
=== Manchester City Women ===
Originally joining the club in a junior role in 2008, Cushing worked his way through a succession of coaching positions starting as a schools coach and progressing to the academy setup before transitioning into the club's women's team. In 2013, as the Manchester City Women began their preparations for their first season in the newly expanded WSL, Cushing was offered his first senior role when he was promoted to the women's team's managerial position, trading places with incumbent manager Leigh Wood, who left the club shortly afterwards.

In his first season Cushing's City started slowly as they adjusted to their new first division status, finishing fifth of eight teams and registering only six victories from their 14 matches, although the season was salvaged to some extent when Manchester City became the first team in four seasons to beat Arsenal to the FA WSL Cup trophy. Their lacklustre form continued at the start of the 2015 season as they took five points from their opening five league games before the season was interrupted for two months by the 2015 Women's World Cup, in which England finished third. Returning from the break, England's performance seemingly brought Cushing's City team to life as he managed them to a run of 12 wins in 13 matches.

Although his side had ended 2015 trophyless, they entered the following season in rampant form, going unbeaten in the league with an unprecedented defensive record of only four goals conceded in 16 games to win a first league title. Cushing then added to his trophy haul with a second WSL Cup triumph in a match which was equally notable for his decision to remain through extra time to the final whistle despite being called to attend his wife going into labour with his third child. Nick also added to his honours with a personal gong, winning Manager of the Year at the FA's Women's Football Awards. While his City team disappointed somewhat as they failed to defend their title in the Spring Series, Cushing was at least able to complete his clean sweep of the domestic trophies, winning the FA Women's Cup with a comprehensive defeat of Birmingham City in May 2017.

=== New York City FC ===
On 9 January 2020, it was announced that Cushing would move to become assistant coach to Ronny Deila at MLS side New York City FC, with his last match in charge of Manchester City Women being against Arsenal on 2 February 2020. On 13 June 2022, Cushing became interim head coach for the club after head coach Ronny Deila departed for Belgian club Standard Liège. On 10 November 2022, Cushing was promoted to head coach ahead of the 2023 season. On 26 November 2024, Cushing was sacked after two seasons as the permanent manager of New York City.

=== Return to Manchester City ===
Following the sacking of Gareth Taylor on 10 March 2025, Cushing returned to Manchester City Women as interim head coach until the end of the 2024–25 season.

=== Denver Summit FC ===
On 6 August 2025, Cushing was appointed first-ever head coach for National Women's Soccer League club Denver Summit. The club began league play in 2026.

== Managerial statistics ==
As of match played 18 July 2026

Managerial record by team and tenure
| Team | Nat | From | To | Record | | | | | | | |
| Team | Nat | From | To | G | W | D | L | GF | GA | GD | Win % |
|---|---|---|---|---|---|---|---|---|---|---|---|
| Manchester City Women | (England) | 11 March 2013 | 8 January 2020 | 186 | 135 | 21 | 30 | 407 | 127 | +280 | 72.58 |
| New York City FC | (United States) | 13 June 2022 | 26 November 2024 | 105 | 36 | 31 | 38 | 142 | 137 | +5 | 34.29 |
| Manchester City Women (interim) | (England) | 10 March 2025 | 4 July 2025 | 10 | 4 | 2 | 4 | 15 | 15 | +0 | 40.00 |
| Denver Summit | (United States) | 6 August 2026 | Present | 14 | 5 | 4 | 5 | 21 | 19 | +2 | 35.71 |
| Total | | | | 315 | 180 | 58 | 77 | 585 | 298 | +287 | 57.14 |

== Honours ==
Manchester City Women

- Women's Super League: 2016
- FA Women's Cup: 2016–17
- FA Women's League Cup: 2014, 2016, 2018–19

Individual

- FA Women's Manager of the Year: 2016
