= Matt Beard =

English football manager (1978–2025)

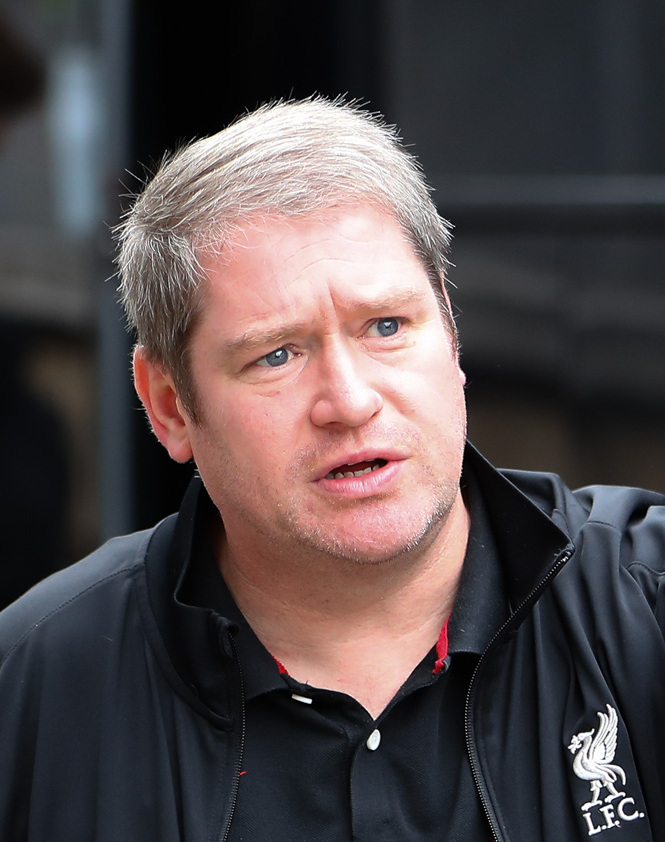
- Beard with Liverpool Women in 2024

Personal information
- Full name: Matthew Beard
- Date of birth: 9 January 1978
- Place of birth: Roehampton, England
- Date of death: 20 September 2025 (aged 47)
- Place of death: Chester, England

Managerial career
- Years: Team
- 2008–2009: Millwall Lionesses
- 2009–2012: Chelsea Ladies
- 2012–2015: Liverpool Women
- 2016–2017: Boston Breakers
- 2018–2020: West Ham United Women
- 2021: Bristol City Women (interim)
- 2021–2025: Liverpool Women
- 2025: Burnley Women

Matthew Beard (9 January 1978 – 20 September 2025) was an English professional football coach. Active primarily in women's football, he managed Millwall, Chelsea, Liverpool, Boston Breakers, West Ham United, Bristol City, and Burnley.

In April 2026, it was announced that Beard had been posthumously named to the WSL Hall of Fame.

== Career ==
=== Early career and Millwall Lionesses ===
Beard had his first coaching job as reserve team manager at non-league Kingstonian. He then had coaching stints at Tooting & Mitcham, Hampton & Richmond Borough, and Charlton Athletic Ladies. After Keith Boanas moved to Millwall Lionesses in June 2008, Beard went too and succeeded in the Lionesses job when Boanas quit after six months. In Beard's first fledgling steps in management, he guided the team to the FA Women's Premier League Southern Division title and promotion to the top tier in the 2008–09 season.

=== Chelsea Ladies ===
Beard was named first-team manager of Chelsea Ladies for the 2009–10 season on the recommendation of team captain and former player-manager Casey Stoney, who had played for Beard when he was an assistant at Charlton. He remained until 2012, having guided the club to the 2012 FA Women's Cup final, the FA Premier League Cup semi-finals in 2009, and a third-place finish in the FA Women's Premier League National Division at the end of the 2009–10 season.

=== Liverpool Women and Boston Breakers ===
Beard then took a position with Liverpool Women for the 2013 and 2014 seasons, and was named FA Women's Super League Manager of the Year in 2013 and 2014. On 22 September 2015, it was announced that he was leaving Liverpool, and had accepted a head coaching position with the Boston Breakers.

=== West Ham United Women ===
On 7 June 2018, Beard was appointed manager of West Ham United Women. In May 2019, he took the club to the FA Cup final, where they lost 3–0 to Manchester City at Wembley. On 19 November 2020, Beard and West Ham agreed on his departure from the club by mutual consent.

=== Return to Liverpool Women ===
On 13 May 2021, it was announced Beard was re-appointed manager of Liverpool Women, and would return six years after he left. He won the FA Women's Championship with them by the end of the season.

On 27 February 2025, it was announced that Beard had departed Liverpool with immediate effect.

=== Burnley Women ===
On 19 June 2025, it was announced that Beard had taken over as head coach of Burnley Women. On 27 August 2025, after two months in the role, Burnley announced that he had resigned with immediate effect, as he wanted to pursue other opportunities.

== Personal life and death ==
Beard was born in Roehampton on 9 January 1978. He and his wife, Debbie, had two children. Beard also had a stepson from his wife's first marriage, who was a youth coach for Chelsea for over 10 years. Beard's older brother Mark Beard played professionally for Millwall, Sheffield United and Southend United.

Beard died on 20 September 2025, at the age of 47. At a coroner's court hearing into his death held on 29 September the court was informed that Beard had been found hanged in his home in Deeside, Flintshire, and that he had died in hospital in Chester later the same day. The inquest concluded that Beard had taken his own life.

== Managerial statistics ==
As of 16 February 2025

All competitive games (league, domestic and continental cups) are included.

Managerial record by team and tenure
Club	Nat.	From	To	Record				
Club	Nat.	From	To	P	W	D	L	Win %
Millwall	(England)	2009	2009	16	12	2	2	75.00
Chelsea	(England)	2009	2012	61	33	8	20	54.10
Liverpool	(England)	2013	2016	58	32	7	19	55.17
Boston Breakers	(United States)	2016	2017	44	7	9	28	15.91
West Ham United	(England)	2018	2020	70	24	10	36	34.29
Bristol City	(England)	2021	2021	15	3	4	8	20.00
Liverpool	(England)	2021	2025	103	50	19	34	48.54
Total				367	161	59	147	43.87

== Honours ==
Liverpool Women

- FA Women's Super League: 2012–13, 2013–14
- FA Women's Championship: 2021–22
- WSL Hall of Fame: inducted April 2026

Individual

- FA WSL Manager of the Season: 2013, 2023–24
- LMA FA Women's Championship Manager of the Year: 2022
