= 2013 FA WSL =

English women's football league

FA WSL
- Season: 2013
- Champions: Liverpool (1st title)
- Matches: 56
- Goals: 177 (3.16 per match)
- Top goalscorer: Natasha Dowie
- Biggest home win: Arsenal 5–0 Everton
- Biggest away win: Doncaster Rovers Belles 0–9 Liverpool
- Highest scoring: Doncaster Rovers Belles 0–9 Liverpool

The 2013 FA WSL was the third season of the FA WSL, the top-level women's football league of England. The season began on 14 April and ended on 29 September.

Arsenal were the defending champions, having won their ninth consecutive English title last season. The top two teams qualified for the 2014–15 UEFA Women's Champions League.

The season was the last before the creation of a second division of the WSL. All teams had to reapply for a place in WSL 1 in the next season. Doncaster Belles were the only current WSL team not granted a WSL 1 place, thus they played in the WSL 2 the following season. This decision had already been taken before Doncaster finished the season bottom of the WSL with the lowest points tally, as no relegation to the WSL 2 based on points was scheduled until the WSL 2 had completed its inaugural season to produce a corresponding promotion team. The reason for Doncaster's relegation from WSL 1 was a failed reapplication based on financial criteria, which is an aspect of the WSL the FA monitors very closely since it funds the participating teams and the teams must regularly prove they can match the FA funding. The Belles' place in the top flight the following season was taken by the Manchester City Ladies team from the FA Women's Premier League National Division, but now re-branded as Manchester City Women. Likewise, Lincoln retained their place in WSL 1 but relocated and re-branded as Notts County Ladies for the following season.

== Teams ==
The same teams as last season returned, as there was no relegation system in place.

Liverpool, who finished bottom in 2011 and 2012, relocated from Skelmersdale to the Halton Stadium in Widnes prior to the 2013 season as part of an ambitious programme of investment. Lincoln left Ashby Avenue to return full-time to Sincil Bank.

Team	Location	Ground	2012 WSL finish
Arsenal	Borehamwood	Meadow Park	1st
Birmingham City	Stratford-upon-Avon	The DCS Stadium	2nd
Bristol Academy	Filton	Stoke Gifford Stadium	4th
Chelsea	Staines	Wheatsheaf Park	6th
Doncaster Rovers Belles	Doncaster	Keepmoat Stadium	7th
Everton	Crosby	The Arriva Stadium	3rd
Lincoln	Lincoln	Sincil Bank	5th
Liverpool	Widnes	Halton Stadium	8th

Locations of the 2013 Super League teams

== League table ==
Pos	Team	Pld	W	D	L	GF	GA	GD	Pts	Qualification or relegation
1	Liverpool (C)	14	12	0	2	46	19	+27	36	Qualification for the Champions League knockout phase
2	Bristol Academy	14	10	1	3	30	20	+10	31	Qualification for the Champions League knockout phase
3	Arsenal (Note: Arsenal were deducted 3 points for fielding an unregistered player)	14	10	3	1	31	11	+20	30	
4	Birmingham City	14	5	3	6	16	21	−5	18	
5	Everton	14	4	3	7	23	30	−7	15	
6	Lincoln	14	2	4	8	10	15	−5	10	
7	Chelsea	14	3	1	10	20	27	−7	10	
8	Doncaster Rovers Belles (Note: Doncaster Rovers Belles relegated to the Super League Second Division on financial grounds.)	14	1	3	10	9	42	−33	6	Relegation to the FA WSL 2

Source: FA WSL
Rules for classification: 1) Points; 2) Goal difference; 3) Number of goals scored
(C) Champions

== Results ==
Home \ Away	ARS	BIR	BRI	CHE	DON	EVE	LIV	LIN
Arsenal		2–0	0–0	2–1	3–1	5–0	0–4	0–0
Birmingham City	1–3		0–2	2–1	1–0	2–1	2–4	1–1
Bristol Academy	2–3	1–0		2–0	3–1	4–3	3–4	2–1
Chelsea	0–1	1–1	1–3		4–0	1–4	2–1	0–2
Doncaster Rovers Belles	0–6	0–3	3–4	0–4		1–1	0–9	1–0
Everton	1–2	0–0	2–3	3–2	2–2		1–4	1–0
Liverpool	0–3	4–1	2–0	4–3	2–0	4–2		3–2
Lincoln	1–1	1–2	0–1	2–0	0–0	0–2	0–1	

Updated to match(es) played on 15 September. Source: FA WSL results
Legend: Blue = home team win; Yellow = draw; Red = away team win.

== Top scorers ==
Rank	Scorer	Club	Goals
1	(England) Natasha Dowie	Liverpool	13
2	(Germany) Nicole Rolser	Liverpool	10
3	(Spain) Natalia Pablos	Bristol Academy	9
4	(Sweden) Louise Fors	Liverpool	7
5	(England) Danielle Carter	Arsenal	6
5	(England) Jordan Nobbs	Arsenal	6
5	(England) Nikita Parris	Everton	6
5	(England) Toni Duggan	Everton	6
5	(Sweden) Sofia Jakobsson	Chelsea	6
5	(England) Eniola Aluko	Chelsea	6
