= Beth Mead =

English footballer (born 1995)

Beth Mead MBE
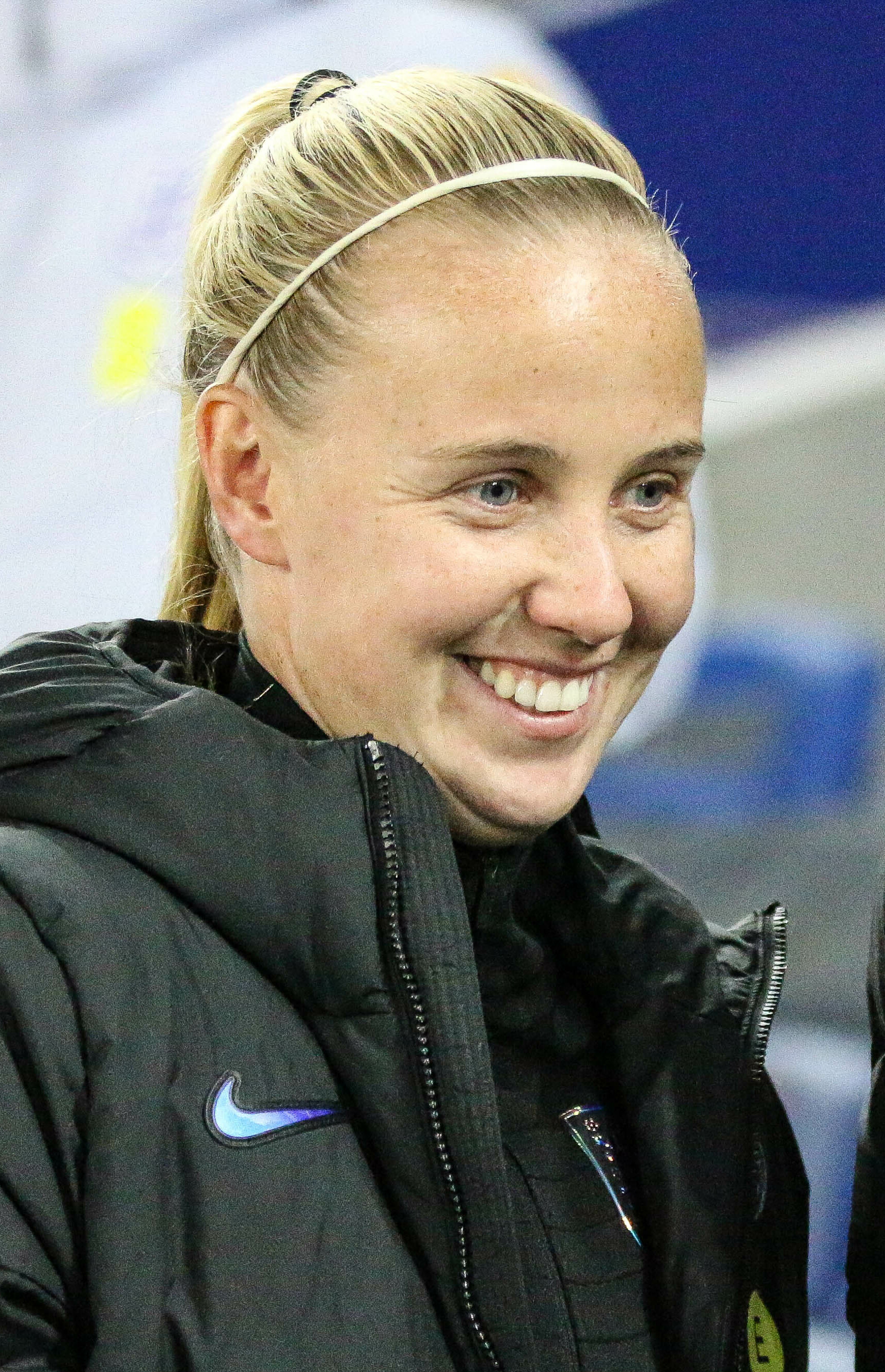
- Mead in 2022

Personal information
- Full name: Bethany Jane Mead
- Date of birth: 9 May 1995 (age 31)
- Place of birth: Hinderwell, nr Whitby, North Yorkshire, England
- Height: 5 ft 4 in (1.63 m)
- Positions: Attacking midfielder; winger

Team information
- Current team: Manchester City
- Number: 7

Youth career
- 2005–2011: Middlesbrough

Senior career*
| Years | Team | Apps | (Gls) |
| 2011–2016 | Sunderland | 82 | (66) |
| 2017–2026 | Arsenal | 167 | (54) |
| 2026– | Manchester City | 7 | (0) |

International career^{‡}
| 2010 | England U15 | 2 | (2) |
| 2010 | England U17 | 3 | (2) |
| 2012–2014 | England U19 | 15 | (5) |
| 2014 | England U20 | 3 | (1) |
| 2015–2017 | England U23 | 5 | (2) |
| 2018– | England | 83 | (40) |
Medal record
Women's football
Representing England
UEFA Women's Championship
| Winner | 2022 England |
| Winner | 2025 Switzerland |
UEFA Women's Under-19 Championship
| Runner-up | 2013 Wales |
- * Club domestic league appearances and goals as of 22 November 2026 ‡ National team caps and goals as of 13 October 2026

Bethany Jane Mead (born 9 May 1995) is an English professional footballer who plays as a forward for the Women's Super League club Manchester City and the England national team. She has previously played for Sunderland and Arsenal.

A creative and prolific forward, she has all-time most assists and all-time second-most goal contributions in the WSL. At Euro 2022, she became the Golden Boot winner, Player of the Tournament, and top assist provider, leading England to win a major tournament for the first time. Later that year, she was named BBC Sports Personality of the Year, becoming the first women's footballer to win the prestigious award; and finished runner-up for the Ballon d'Or and UEFA Player of the Year. She was part of the England squad which won Euro 2025, having her penalty saved in the shootout of the tournament's final.

In 2015, Mead won the WSL Golden Boot and the WSL Player of the Year award, becoming the youngest WSL Golden Boot winner at the age of 20. It was only a season after leading her then-club Sunderland's promotion and WSL 2 title win. Having scored 81 goals in 109 games, she is regarded as one of the greatest players to have ever played for Sunderland.

Converted to a winger at Arsenal, Mead holds numerous WSL records in playmaking, including all-time most assists, most assists in a season, most chances created in a season, and most chances created from open play in a season. She was the WSL top assist provider in the 2018–19 and 2021–22 seasons. In the 2021–22 season, she was nominated for WSL Player of the Season. She won the 2018–19 WSL title with Arsenal, as well as the 2024–25 Champions League.

Mead helped England reach the semi-final at the 2019 Women's World Cup, providing second-most assists in the tournament. In 2022, she broke Jimmy Greaves' 61-year-old record of the most goals scored in a season by an England player of either gender and was named BBC Women's Footballer of the Year and World Soccer World Player of the Year. She was appointed a Member of the Order of the British Empire (MBE) in the 2023 New Year Honours for her services to football.

Mead and her alma mater Teesside University launched the Beth Mead Scholarship in February 2022. Her autobiography, Lioness: My Journey to Glory, was published in November 2022 and became a Sunday Times bestseller.

== Early life ==
Bethany Jane Mead was born on 9 May 1995 to parents June and Richard. She has a brother, Ben. Mead grew up in Hinderwell, a small village near Whitby, which she has described as ‘‘a fishing town in the middle of nowhere.’’ Mead attended Oakridge Community Primary School in Hinderwell where she played with the boys' football team and was the only girl. She was captain of the primary school team, and has stated that made other girls feel more comfortable to join. The team won the local primary school cup for boys' teams with four girls in the team.

Mead started playing football when she was six years old. Her mother took her to a Saturday morning football session on a village field to encourage her to expend energy. Initially concerned that Mead would be the only girl in the session, the coach later remarked that Mead was rougher than most of the boys.

Mead took part in many sports, including cross-country running, netball, cricket, and field hockey, but ‘‘football always hit [her] different.’’ She has described football as her ‘‘one true love.’’ Mead joined in with her local senior men's cricket team and caught two balls from her brother's bowling; she states that the local newspaper described it as the ‘Mead Show.’

== Youth career ==
Age nine, Mead began her youth career at California Boys FC and the Middlesbrough centre of excellence. During her time playing in Middlesbrough, her mother picked up a second job to help cover the cost of petrol.

While playing in the boys' league with California Boys, Mead states that other team's players and parents would laugh when they saw her turn up because she was a girl. Her teammates used to tell the other team to laugh ahead of kick-off because they knew that as soon as the game started, she would be running rings around them. Mead's father advised her to not engage as ‘‘[her] football [would] do the talking.’’ Mead states that she ultimately earned a lot of respect from teams and their parents.

As a teenager, Mead scored a hat-trick in six or seven minutes for Middlesbrough against Sunderland, considered to be one of the best teams in England at the time. When she turned 16, Mick Mulhern, Sunderland's then-manager, met Mead and her parents to sign her up for the team. According to Mulhern, his determination to sign her came as he ‘‘knew [what] she would become.’’

== Club career ==
=== Sunderland, 2011–16 ===
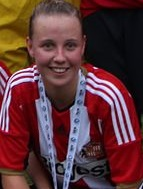
Mead celebrating Sunderland's promotion to WSL1 in 2014

==== 2011–13: Back-to-back WPL titles and Golden Boot awards ====
In 2011–12, her first season in the FA Women's Premier League (WPL), Mead scored 23 goals in 23 games. Sunderland won the league, in part due to Mead's winning goal against Leeds United. Sunderland also won their first FA Women's Premier League Cup, completing a domestic double. Mead won the WPL Golden Boot, was jointly named Sunderland Player of the Year award alongside captain Stephanie Bannon, and won the Mavis Clayton Memorial Trophy for Outstanding Achievement. Bannon acted as a mentor for Mead.

In the 2012–13 season, Mead recorded 30 goals in 28 matches. She again won the FA WPL Golden Boot and Sunderland Player of the Year award. She was also named Top Female Achiever at the Scarborough and District Sports Awards.

==== 2014: Leading Sunderland's promotion ====
In 2014, Sunderland won the FA WSL 2 and gained promotion to the WSL. Mead was the team's top-scorer with 15 goals across all competition. She was nominated for WSL 2 Player of the Year, and named SportsByte Sports Person of the Year, Top Female Achiever at the Scarborough and District Sports Awards, and Sunderland Supporters' Young Player of the Year.

Although Mead turned professional upon Sunderland's league promotion, she resolved to finish her final year at Teesside University; as part of the ‘Where Greatness Is Made’ campaign, a plaque honouring Mead was installed at the university. She also kept working at her local pub; the landlord had sponsored her during her early career, and Mead repaid the support by working behind the bar.

==== 2015–16: The youngest WSL Golden Boot winner ====
In her first match in the WSL, Mead scored in Sunderland's shock 2–1 win over reigning champions Liverpool. On 19 July 2015, Mead scored a hat-trick against league leaders Chelsea, making her the league-leading scorer with eight goals. Earlier that week, Mead rolled her car three times while trying to avoid a deer, but avoided injury. The following week, she scored twice in a 4–1 win against Bristol, sending Sunderland to the top of the WSL's league table. Her 11 goals in ten games became the league record for most goals in the first ten appearances for a club.

Mead ended the 2015 season as the leading goalscorer in the WSL with 12 goals in 14 appearances. At the age of 20, she became the youngest WSL Golden Boot winner ever. Sunderland finished in fourth place.

During this period, Mead was mentored by Jermain Defoe. Defoe had watched Mead's goals and asked ‘‘What were you thinking when you did that?’’ Mead states that they have stayed in touch. In 2022, Defoe wrote an afterword to Mead's autobiography.

Alongside the WSL Golden Boot, Mead was named WSL Player's Player of the Year, PFA Young Player of the Year, England Young Player of the Year, North East Football Writers' Association (FWA) Ladies Player of the Year, Sunderland Player of the Year, Sunderland Supporters' Player of the Year, SportsByte Sports Person of the Year, and Top Female Achiever at Scarborough and District Sports Awards. She was nominated for PFA Players' Player of the Year and was selected for the PFA Team of the Year.

Mead is regarded as one of Sunderland's best-ever players. Roker Report said: ‘‘Long standing fans of the Lasses had never quite seen anything like it, she was almost unplayable at times.’’ In 2019l Mead was named Sunderland Forward of the Decade and was selected in Sunderland Team of the Decade.

=== Arsenal, 2017–2026 ===
==== 2017–18 ====
On 24 January 2017, it was announced that Arsenal had signed Mead to a contract with an undisclosed length. She had resisted several offers from Arsenal since 2015 to finish her university degree. At Arsenal, Vivianne Miedema soon occupied the centre-forward role, so Mead began to play as a winger instead.

Arsenal won the 2017–18 FA Women's League Cup with Mead scoring in the knockout rounds against her former club Sunderland. Mead finished the 2017–18 season as Arsenal's top goalscorer in the league with eight goals. Mead was named England Young Player of the Year for the second time, Football Supporters' Association (FSA) Player of the Year, and selected in the PFA Team of the Year.

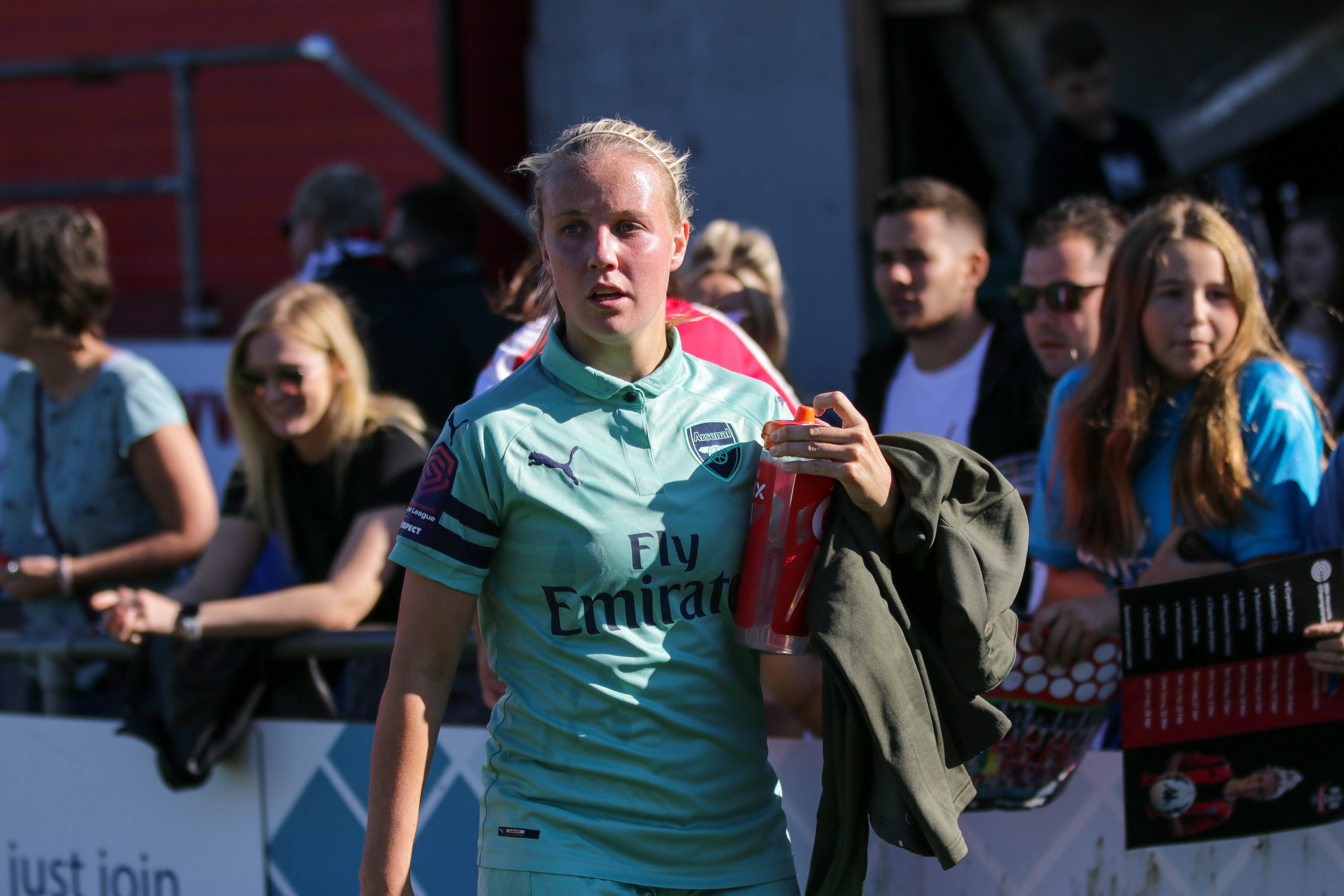
Mead with Arsenal in 2018

==== 2018–19: WSL title and most assists in a season record ====
By the 2018–19 season, Mead grew a lot under Joe Montemurro.She topped various creative statistics in the league, registering the highest assists per 90 (0.71), most carries into penalty area (42), highest xG assisted (6.6), most crosses into penalty area (19), and most shot-creating actions (96).

On 28 April 2019, Mead scored the third goal in Arsenal's 4–0 title-clinching win over Brighton & Hove Albion.The goal won the WSL Goal of the Season award. Mead was nominated for the 2019 FSA Player of the Year. In addition, she was named WSL Player of the Month in March 2019 and April 2019.

==== 2019–20 ====
On 28 November 2019, Mead signed a new long-term contract with Arsenal. She suffered an injury during a 3–2 league win against Liverpool on 13 February 2020. A week later, Arsenal announced that she had injured her medial collateral ligament. The 2019–20 WSL season ended prematurely on 13 March 2020, due to the coronavirus pandemic.

Arsenal was the only WSL club to proceed to the 2019–20 UEFA Women's Champions League quarter-final but, despite a goal from Mead, were defeated 1–2 by Paris Saint-Germain.

==== 2020–21 ====
On 15 November 2020, Mead scored in the 86th minute of a 1–1 draw against league champions Chelsea. During the 2020–21 season, Mead provided the second-most assists in the WSL.

==== 2021–22: WSL all-time assists leader and Arsenal Player of the Season ====
In the 2021–22 season, Mead was the top assist provider (8) and scored the third-most goals (11) in the WSL, helping Arsenal push in a title race that went down to the final day. Arsenal finished the season in second place, only a point behind champions Chelsea. Arsenal were the only WSL team to proceed to the knockout stage in the 2021–22 UEFA Women's Champions League.

Mead set several WSL playmaking records in the season: she became the WSL all-time assists leader, broke the record for most chances created in a season (72), and most chances created from open play in a season (54+). She again led the majority of creative statistics in the league.

With 14 goals and 19 assists in 34 starts, Mead's total goal contributions in the season came to 33. During the league opener against defending champions Chelsea, Mead scored a brace to defeat Chelsea 3–2. She was named Player of the Match. On 27 January 2022, Arsenal was behind Brighton & Hope Albion 0–1 after the first half. Mead assisted the equalling goal and scored the second. She was named Player of the Match. On 24 April 2022, Mead not only became the WSL all-time assist leader, but also scored her 50th WSL goal. Additionally, she assisted Jordan Nobbs' 50th WSL goal. She was named the Player of the Match.

Mead established herself as the centrepiece of the pressing and counter-pressing system under new manager Jonas Eidevall. She topped the charts for pressing and defensive actions in the final third. On her counterpressing ability, Eidevall said: ‘‘I have never coached a player who is as fast at it (counterpressing) as Beth Mead.’’

Mead was named the FSA Player of the Year and nominated for both the WSL Player of the Season and PFA Fan's Player of the Year. She won both the Arsenal Player of the Season award and Arsenal Women Supporters Club Player of the Season awards. Her other accolades included: GiveMeSportW Fans' WSL Player of the Season nominee, On Her Side WSL Player of the Season runner-up, The Athletic WSL Team of the Year, WSL Player of the Month (September 2021), (tie) for Most Player of the Month awards (3), PFA WSL Fan's Player of the Month (November 2021), and Arsenal Goal of the Month in January 2022.

In October 2022, Mead revealed it was her mother's diagnosis of terminal ovarian cancer in summer 2021 that fuelled her performance in the 2021–22 season. She said it had ‘‘made [her] look at life a lot differently’’, and that she had spent all year ‘‘trying to put a smile on [her] mum's face.’’

==== 2022: WSL all-time second-most goal contributions and ACL injury ====
Mead became the WSL's second all-time goal contributor (with 54 goals and 39 assists) on 16 September 2022. She was named PFA Fan's Player of the Month and Arsenal Player of the Month for September 2022 after scoring three goals and recording two assists in two games. On 19 October 2022, she was named Player of the Match in Arsenal's historic 5–1 win over Champions League holders Lyon. She scored two goals and assisted a further one. It marked the first time Lyon had lost by more than a single goal in the Champions League since 2009 and was their second defeat in 83 home games.

On 19 November 2022, Mead suffered a ruptured anterior cruciate ligament (ACL). She called for more research into ACL injuries in women's football as 25% of 2022 Ballon d'Or nominees — including champion Alexia Putellas — were facing the injury. On 16 December 2022, Mead signed a new contract with Arsenal.

Despite her injury, Mead created the second-most chances of any player in a single calendar year in WSL history. Furthermore, she was the joint-top scorer in all women's UEFA competition for club and country in 2022, tied with Aitana Bonmatí. She finished second for the IFFHS World's Best International Goalscorer, and runner-up for the ATA Football WSL Player of the Year 2022. On 21 December, she was named BBC Sports Personality of the Year ahead of Ben Stokes and Eve Muirhead. She was also named BBC Women's Footballer of the Year.

==== 2023–24: Return from ACL injury ====
On 15 October 2023, Mead made her return after an 11-month period on the sidelines, coming on as a substitute for Noelle Maritz. Arsenal were down 0–1 to Aston Villa, but found the net twice in stoppage time to seal an all-important first win of the season, with Mead assisting Alessia Russo's match-winning goal. On 26 November, Mead scored a first-half brace in a 3–0 win against West Ham, her first (and second) goal since returning from injury. She hence became the second player to reach 100 goals and assists in the WSL.

==== 2024–25 ====
In the opening game of the 2024–25 Women's Super League season, Mead scored against Manchester City (and former teammate, and partner, Vivianne Miedema). Following Arsenal's Champions League quarter-final against Real Madrid, Mead publicly stated that players are owed better quality pitches. On 30 March 2025, Mead scored her 50th WSL goal for Arsenal. On 24 May, during the 2025 Champions League final, Mead assisted the winning goal after being introduced as a 68th-minute substitute, securing Arsenal their second European title.

==== 2025–26 ====
On 6 September 2025, in the WSL season opener against London City Lionesses, Mead recorded two assists, making her the first person to amass 50 WSL assists. On 1 February 2026, she was part of the squad which won the 2026 FIFA Women's Champions Cup after a 3–2 victory over Corinthians in the final.

In February 2026, Mead suffered a fractured shin playing against Manchester City, meaning she would be sidelined for a period of time. On 11 May 2026, it was announced that she would leave Arsenal at the end of the season.

=== Manchester City ===
On 12 June 2026, Beth Mead joined 2025–26 WSL champions Manchester City, signing a contract until 2029. She took the number 7 shirt following the retirement of Laura Coombs.

== International career ==
=== Youth ===
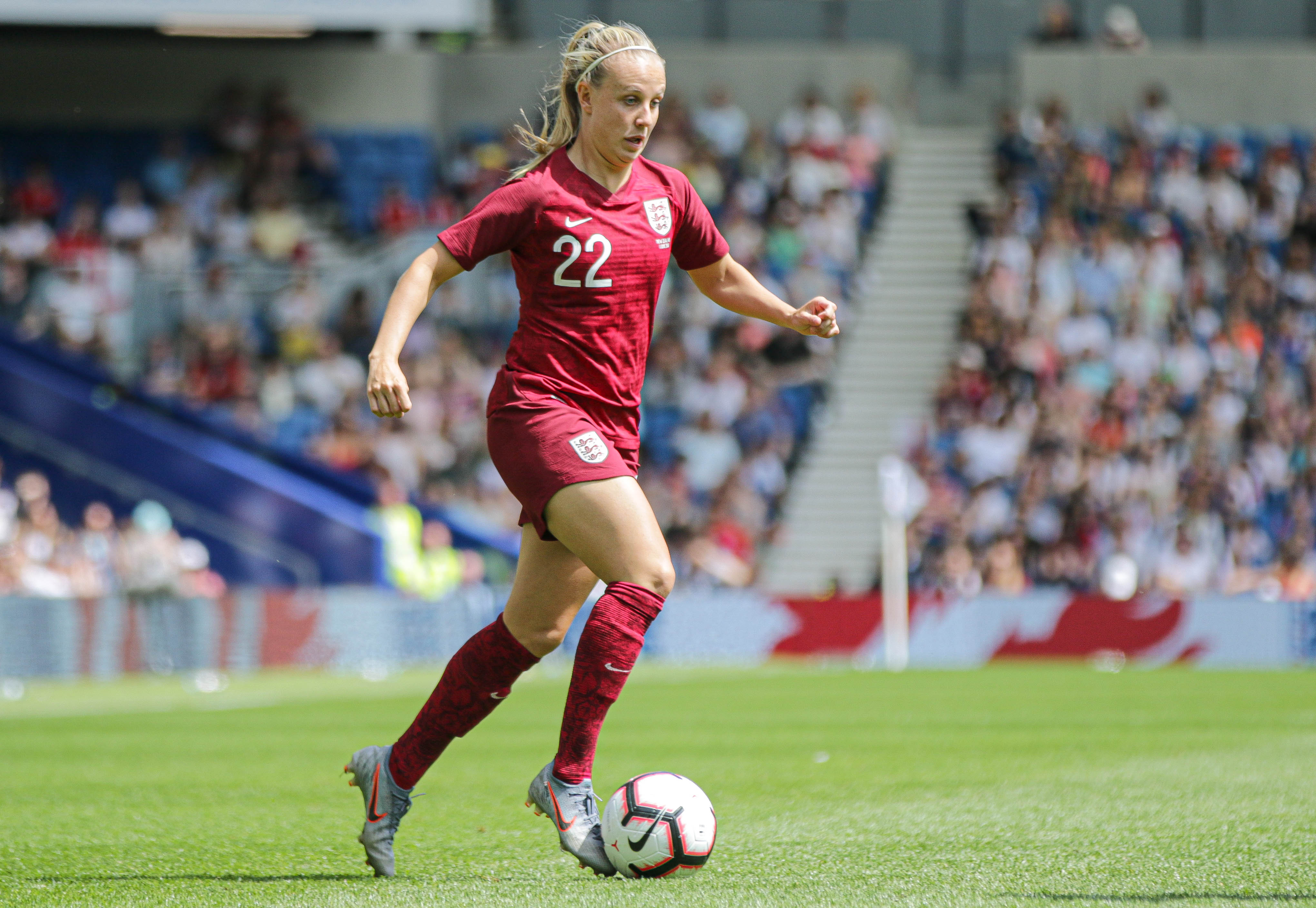
Mead playing for England in 2019

Mead has represented England at every age level from under-15.

Mead was a part of the England under-19 team that won the silver at the 2013 Under-19 Championship. She scored a brace in the semifinal, and won the silver ball.

Mead played in all three matches for England under-20 at the 2014 U-20 Women's World Cup, and scored a long-range goal against Mexico. The goal was voted as the third-best of the tournament.

=== Senior ===
==== 2018: Debut ====
In April 2018, Mead made her debut for the senior England side in a 0–0 draw against Wales during 2019 Women's World Cup qualification. Mead started her first match in September 2018, scoring twice in England's 6–0 win over Kazakhstan in Pavlodar.

==== 2019–20: World Cup and England Player of the Year finalist ====
Mead scored two goals as England won the 2019 SheBelieves Cup. During the opening game, she scored a "stunning" match-winning goal against Brazil. The finish was later affectionately named ‘‘crot’’ (cross-shot) and has been declared her signature. A few days later, she scored in the team's 3–0 victory against Japan. On 9 April 2019, Mead scored the opening goal in a 2–1 victory over Spain.

Mead started in the first two matches of the 2019 Women's World Cup in France. She provided the assist to Jodie Taylor's goal in the Lionesses' 1–0 group stage win over Argentina. After finishing first in Group D and defeating Cameroon 3–0 in the Round of 16, England faced Norway in the quarter-finals. In the match, Mead assisted Lucy Bronze's goal as England recorded another 3–0 win. In the semi-final against defending champions the United States, Mead assisted Ellen White's equaliser in the first half although England were ultimately defeated 2–1. The semi-final match ended up being the most watched programme on UK television in 2019 with 11.7 million viewers. Due to her performance at the World Cup, Mead was shortlisted for 2019 England Player of the Year and named Yorkshire Post's Sports Hero of 2019.

In October 2019, Mead scored England's game-winning goal against Portugal. She won the Player of the Match Award. Later that month, she created more chances than any other player during a 2–1 loss to Brazil in front of a record-breaking 29,238 fans at Riverside Stadium in Middlesbrough.

In February 2020, Mead was left off the squad for the 2020 SheBelieves Cup due to injury.

==== 2021–22: Goal scoring form and Euro 2022 ====
On 23 October 2021, Mead scored her first international hat-trick in a 4–0 win against Northern Ireland in the 2023 World Cup qualification phase. Her hat-trick was recorded within fourteen minutes. She became the first woman to score a hat-trick for England at Wembley.

On 30 November 2021, Mead scored her second international hat-trick, as well as a hat-trick of assists, as England defeated Latvia 20–0 in a further World Cup qualification. As of August 2026, the match is England's biggest-ever win. On 8 April 2022, Mead scored a further four goals in a 10–0 victory over North Macedonia.

On 24 June 2022, Mead, a half-time substitute, scored a brace against reigning European champions and World Cup finalists the Netherlands. Her first goal came only 54 seconds after the Dutch missed a decisive penalty. She added her second (England's fifth goal of the night) in the final minute of regulation time. She won England's Player of the Match award. Her goals took her to 14 in the season for England, surpassing Jimmy Greaves' record of 13 from the 1960–61 season.

At the home Euro 2022, Mead scored the tournament's opening goal in a 1–0 win over Austria. Against Norway, she scored her fourth career international hat-trick and assisted a goal. Naming her the Player of the Match, the UEFA Technical Observer said Mead showed ‘‘a real will to score.’’ Her second goal of the match was selected as one of the top ten goals of the tournament. Against Northern Ireland, she scored a goal and assisted two to complete a run of scoring in every group stage match. In the semi-final against Sweden, Mead scored the first goal of the match against the run of play and provided 2 assists. She was again named the Player of the Match.

In the final, Mead was substituted in the second-half due to injury. It was her replacement Chloe Kelly who would score the 110th-minute match winner. With six goals and five assists, Mead won the Golden Boot and was named Player of the Tournament, as England won the tournament. It was the Lionesses' first major trophy and the first win by any England senior-level team since 1966. She became the first English player of either gender to win both the Golden Boot and Player of the Tournament award at a Euro or World Cup. Her six goals tied the record for most goals ever scored in a single edition of the Women's Euro and most goals at a single major tournament by an England player of either gender. She was directly involved in half of England's goals at the tournament.

Across the 2021–22 season, Mead scored 20 goals and assisted in 16 of England's 19 matches.

==== 2022–23: Acclaim and injury ====
Following her impressive performance at the Euro 2022, Mead was named BBC Women's Footballer of the Year, World Soccer World Player of the Year, England Player of the Year, and FSA Player of the Year; and finished runner-up for the Ballon d'Or, UEFA Player of the Year, IFFHS World's Best Player, and The Guardian 100 Best Footballers in the World. She became only the second English footballer of either gender (after Michael Owen in 2001) to win the World Soccer World Player of the Year award.The Daily Telegraph named her the best player in Europe in 2022. She was voted third in Fans' Footballer of the Year, ahead of prominent Premier League players such as Bukayo Saka, Erling Haaland, Kevin De Bruyne, and Harry Kane. She was the first women's footballer on the shortlist in the history of the award. Mead made the final three-woman shortlist for Globe Soccer Awards Player of the Year and was voted fourth in Goal 50 for the best female players in the world. She was selected in the IFFHS World Team 2022 and ATA Football World Team of the Year.

Mead was named BBC Sports Personality of the Year, by a landslide victory. She was the first female footballer to win the award, and it marked the first time that a female footballer has appeared in the top three of the voting. Additionally, Mead was only the sixth footballer to receive the accolade, and the first since 2009. She was the first Arsenal and former or current Sunderland player of either gender to win the award. She was the second out LGBTQ+ player to win the award, after John Curry in 1976. The Lionesses won Team of the Year, while coach Sarina Wiegman became the first woman to win the award for Coach of the Year. Mead's back-to-back win with 2021 winner Emma Raducanu made them the first consecutive female winners since 1971–72. Mead, who was at the time recovering from an ACL injury and unable to play, was celebrated by Arsenal teammates on the team bus after their win against FC Zurich in the 2022–23 Champions League and congratulated via FaceTime.

Mead was named Sports Journalists' Association (SJA) Sportswoman of the Year. She was the first footballer to win the award. She finished runner-up for the European Sportswoman of the Year awarded by the International Sports Press Association (AIPS). L'Équipe, a French sport newspaper, voted her ninth in L'Équipe Champion of Champions. She was the only Brit in the top 10. Sky Sports named her one of Sporting Superstars of 2022 alongside international stars such as Lionel Messi and Stephen Curry. She was named Yorkshire Sports Performer of 2022 and Yorkshire Young Achievers Personality of the Year. She was nominated for Sunday Times Sportswomen of the Year and BT Sport Action Woman of the Year.

On August 2022, it was announced that Mead was to be appointed a Member of the Order of the British Empire (MBE) in the 2023 New Year Honours for her services to football.

Mead earned her 50th cap against Japan on 11 November 2022. She was the joint-top scorer with Aitana Bonmatí in all women's UEFA competition for club and country in 2022. She finished second for the IFFHS World's Best International Goalscorer.

Mead was allotted 204 when the FA announced their legacy numbers scheme to honour the 50th anniversary of England's inaugural international.

Mead was left out of the England team for the World Cup due to her an anterior cruciate ligament injury.

==== 2023–25: Return to the squad and Euro 2025 ====
In November 2023, Mead was selected for England for the first time since her injury and made her return on 1 December in the UEFA Women's Nations League group stages. Coming on at half time when the team were down by two goals, ESPN considered Mead a big part in the Lionesses eventual 3–2 win.

In February 2025, after originally being selected for England's upcoming Nations League matches, Mead withdrew due to sustaining an injury, and was replaced by Chloe Kelly. Mead returned to the squad in March 2025, ahead of their Nations League matches against Belgium.

On 5 June 2025, Mead was named in the squad for the Euro 2025 in Switzerland. She scored a goal in the Lionesses' 6–1 group stage victory over Wales. On 27 July 2025, Mead came on as a substitute in the tournament's final; her shot in the penalty shootout was saved by Cata Coll after Mead had to retake her kick. England defeated Spain 1–1 (3–1 on penalties) to retain their European title.

== Off the pitch ==
=== In culture and the media ===
In 2015, Mead won the inaugural Yorkshire Open Egg Throwing Championships in her village, Hinderwell.

Mead has spoken openly about her sexuality. She was nominated for British LGBT Awards in 2020 and 2022. While playing for Sunderland, Mead graduated from Teesside University with a degree in Sports Development. In February 2022, Mead and Teesside launched the Beth Mead Scholarship to support dual-career students who have the potential to reach professional, national or international level within women's football. As of 2022, Beth Mead scholars received a bursary of £1,200, as well as bespoke sport science support. This included strength and conditioning, physiotherapy, sport nutrition, sport psychology, biomechanical analysis and sport physiology support from a team of experts at the university. In addition, scholars also received one-to-one and group mentoring with Mead during their studies, as well as branded sports kits and gym membership.

On August 2022, it was announced that Mead was to be appointed a Member of the Order of the British Empire (MBE) in the 2023 New Year Honours for her services to football. In November 2022, Mead published her autobiography Lioness: My Journey to Glory (ISBN 9781399611671), with a foreword by Ian Wright and an afterword by Jermain Defoe. It became a Sunday Times bestseller and won the Sunday Times award for autobiography of the year in May 2023. In June 2023, Mead published a children's book titled Roar: A Football Hero's Guide to Dreaming Big and Playing the Game You Love (ISBN 9781526365866).

=== Advocacy ===
==== Women's football ====
In February 2020, Mead joined #WePlayStrong, a social media campaign fronted by UEFA. The campaign aimed to shift perceptions of women's football and increase participation levels among 13–17-year-old girls. The series followed the daily lives of female professional footballers. In August 2022, Mead was the face of Trainline's ‘Tenner off Match Day Travel’ campaign, offering fans traveling to WSL fixtures £10 off rail travel. In September 2022, Mead became an ambassador of McDonald's Fun Football, a programme aiming to provide equal opportunity to free football. Soon after the Euro 2022, England's Lionesses wrote an open letter to Conservative Party leadership election candidates Rishi Sunak and Liz Truss, in which they declared their ‘‘legacy and goal was to inspire a nation.’’ The letter urged the candidates to support opportunities for girls to play football in schools. In October 2022, Mead was nominated for the European Diversity Awards Media Diversity Champion of the Year for her work surrounding women's football.

==== Ovarian Cancer Action ====
In December 2022, Mead partnered with Ovarian Cancer Action on a limited edition Christmas card. Her mother, June, had been diagnosed with ovarian cancer in 2021, and died of the condition in January 2023. Shortly after, Mead became an ambassador for Ovarian Cancer Action and lead a fundraising campaign in honour of her mother. In February 2023, she announced her captaincy for Walk in Her Name, an initiative for Ovarian Cancer Awareness Month. In 2024, Mead completed the walk alongside a number of her Arsenal teammates.

==== Other ====
Mead has advocated for Battersea Dogs & Cats Home, an animal rescue centre for dogs and cats. Battersea was featured in Sky Sports' Inside the WSL: Beth Mead Special in September 2022. In October 2022, she appeared in Battersea's Wear Blue for Rescue promotion video.

=== Personal life ===
In 2021, Mead's mother, June, was diagnosed with terminal ovarian cancer diagnosis. Mead has stated that the diagnosis motivated her during the 2021–22 league season and England's Euro 2022 success. June Mead died on 7 January 2023.

Mead has previously been in relationships with Rachael Laws and former Arsenal teammate Daniëlle van de Donk. As of 2022, Mead is in a relationship with former Arsenal and current Manchester City teammate Vivianne Miedema. In late 2022, Mead and Miedema suffered ACL injuries within four weeks of each other; their recovery was captured in a five-part documentary titled Step by Step. They have a working cocker spaniel named Myle.

Mead is good friends with former Arsenal and England teammate Jordan Nobbs. Mead states that she used to look up to Nobbs, who had played at Middlesbrough Centre of Excellence in the age group above her. Since the pair had similar career pathways, Mead has joked that she followed Nobbs.

== Career statistics ==
=== Club ===
As of match played 22 November 2026

Appearances and goals by club, season and competition
| Club | Season | League | | | FA Cup (Note: Includes the Women's FA Cup) | | League Cup (Note: Includes the WSL Players Cup/Women's League Cup) | | Europe (Note: Includes the UEFA Women's Champions League) | | Other | | Total | |
| Club | Season | Division | Apps | Goals | Apps | Goals | Apps | Goals | Apps | Goals | Apps | Goals | Apps | Goals |
|---|---|---|---|---|---|---|---|---|---|---|---|---|---|---|
| Sunderland | 2011–12 | WNL Northern | 19 | 18 | 0 | 0 | 4 | 5 | — | | — | | 23 | 23 |
| Sunderland | 2012–13 | WNL Northern | 18 | 17 | 4 | 5 | 6 | 8 | — | | — | | 28 | 30 |
| Sunderland | 2014 | Women's Championship | 15 | 13 | 0 | 0 | 5 | 2 | — | | — | | 20 | 15 |
| Sunderland | 2015 | WSL 1 | 14 | 12 | 0 | 0 | 5 | 2 | — | | — | | 19 | 14 |
| Sunderland | 2016 | WSL 1 | 16 | 6 | 3 | 1 | 0 | 0 | — | | — | | 19 | 7 |
| Sunderland | Total | | 82 | 66 | 7 | 6 | 20 | 17 | — | | — | | 109 | 89 |
| Arsenal | 2017 | WSL 1 | 5 | 1 | 1 | 1 | 0 | 0 | — | | — | | 6 | 2 |
| Arsenal | 2017–18 | WSL 1 | 17 | 8 | 5 | 2 | 7 | 6 | — | | — | | 29 | 16 |
| Arsenal | 2018–19 | WSL | 19 | 7 | 1 | 0 | 6 | 1 | — | | — | | 26 | 8 |
| Arsenal | 2019–20 | WSL | 14 | 3 | 1 | 0 | 7 | 5 | 5 | 1 | — | | 27 | 9 |
| Arsenal | 2020–21 | WSL | 21 | 4 | 1 | 2 | 2 | 0 | — | | — | | 24 | 6 |
| Arsenal | 2021–22 | WSL | 22 | 11 | 3 | 1 | 1 | 0 | 11 | 1 | — | | 37 | 13 |
| Arsenal | 2022–23 | WSL | 7 | 3 | 0 | 0 | 0 | 0 | 4 | 2 | — | | 11 | 5 |
| Arsenal | 2023–24 | WSL | 20 | 8 | 2 | 0 | 6 | 1 | 0 | 0 | — | | 28 | 9 |
| Arsenal | 2024–25 | WSL | 21 | 7 | 2 | 2 | 1 | 0 | 13 | 1 | — | | 37 | 10 |
| Arsenal | 2025–26 | WSL | 21 | 2 | 2 | 0 | 2 | 0 | 8 | 3 | 2 (Note: Appearances in FIFA Women's Champions Cup) | 0 | 35 | 5 |
| Arsenal | Total | | 167 | 54 | 18 | 8 | 32 | 13 | 41 | 8 | 2 | 0 | 260 | 83 |
| Manchester City | 2026–27 | WSL | 7 | 0 | 0 | 0 | — | | 3 | 1 | — | | 10 | 1 |
| Career total | | | 256 | 120 | 25 | 14 | 52 | 30 | 44 | 9 | 2 | 0 | 379 | 173 |

=== International ===
As of match played 13 October 2026

Appearances and goals by national team and year
| National team | Year | Apps | Goals |
|---|---|---|---|
| England | 2018 | 7 | 2 |
| England | 2019 | 18 | 6 |
| England | 2021 | 7 | 8 |
| England | 2022 | 18 | 13 |
| England | 2023 | 2 | 1 |
| England | 2024 | 11 | 3 |
| England | 2025 | 15 | 6 |
| England | 2026 | 5 | 1 |
| Total | | 83 | 40 |

As of match played 9 June 2026
Scores and results list England's goal tally first, score column indicates score after each Mead goal.

List of international goals scored by Beth Mead
| No. | Date | Venue | Opponent | Score | Result | Competition | Ref. |
|---|---|---|---|---|---|---|---|
| 1 | 4 September 2018 | Ortalik Stadion, Pavlodar, Kazakhstan | Kazakhstan | 1–0 | 6–0 | 2019 FIFA World Cup qualification | |
| 2 | 4 September 2018 | Ortalik Stadion, Pavlodar, Kazakhstan | Kazakhstan | 5–0 | 6–0 | 2019 FIFA World Cup qualification | |
| 3 | 27 February 2019 | Talen Energy Stadium, Chester, United States | Brazil | 2–1 | 2–1 | 2019 SheBelieves Cup | |
| 4 | 5 March 2019 | Raymond James Stadium, Tampa, United States | Japan | 3–0 | 3–0 | 2019 SheBelieves Cup | |
| 5 | 9 April 2019 | County Ground, Swindon, England | Spain | 1–0 | 2–1 | Friendly | |
| 6 | 29 August 2019 | Den Dreef, Leuven, Belgium | Belgium | 2–0 | 3–3 | Friendly | |
| 7 | 8 October 2019 | Estádio do Bonfim, Setúbal, Portugal | Portugal | 1–0 | 1–0 | Friendly | |
| 8 | 12 November 2019 | Stadion Střelecký ostrov, České Budějovice, Czech Republic | Czech Republic | 2–1 | 3–2 | Friendly | |
| 9 | 17 September 2021 | St Mary's Stadium, Southampton, England | North Macedonia | 8–0 | 8–0 | 2023 FIFA World Cup qualification | |
| 10 | 23 October 2021 | Wembley Stadium, London, England | Northern Ireland | 1–0 | 4–0 | 2023 FIFA World Cup qualification | |
| 11 | 23 October 2021 | Wembley Stadium, London, England | Northern Ireland | 3–0 | 4–0 | 2023 FIFA World Cup qualification | |
| 12 | 23 October 2021 | Wembley Stadium, London, England | Northern Ireland | 4–0 | 4–0 | 2023 FIFA World Cup qualification | |
| 13 | 26 October 2021 | Daugava Stadium, Liepāja, Latvia | Latvia | 5–0 | 10–0 | 2023 FIFA World Cup qualification | |
| 14 | 30 November 2021 | Keepmoat Stadium, Doncaster, England | Latvia | 1–0 | 20–0 | 2023 FIFA World Cup qualification | |
| 15 | 30 November 2021 | Keepmoat Stadium, Doncaster, England | Latvia | 4–0 | 20–0 | 2023 FIFA World Cup qualification | |
| 16 | 30 November 2021 | Keepmoat Stadium, Doncaster, England | Latvia | 6–0 | 20–0 | 2023 FIFA World Cup qualification | |
| 17 | 8 April 2022 | Toše Proeski Arena, Skopje, North Macedonia | North Macedonia | 1–0 | 10–0 | 2023 FIFA World Cup qualification | |
| 18 | 8 April 2022 | Toše Proeski Arena, Skopje, North Macedonia | North Macedonia | 2–0 | 10–0 | 2023 FIFA World Cup qualification | |
| 19 | 8 April 2022 | Toše Proeski Arena, Skopje, North Macedonia | North Macedonia | 6–0 | 10–0 | 2023 FIFA World Cup qualification | |
| 20 | 8 April 2022 | Toše Proeski Arena, Skopje, North Macedonia | North Macedonia | 7–0 | 10–0 | 2023 FIFA World Cup qualification | |
| 21 | 24 June 2022 | Elland Road, Leeds, England | Netherlands | 2–1 | 5–1 | Friendly | |
| 22 | 24 June 2022 | Elland Road, Leeds, England | Netherlands | 5–1 | 5–1 | Friendly | |
| 23 | 6 July 2022 | Old Trafford, Manchester, England | Austria | 1–0 | 1–0 | UEFA Euro 2022 | |
| 24 | 11 July 2022 | Falmer Stadium, Brighton and Hove, England | Norway | 4–0 | 8–0 | UEFA Euro 2022 | |
| 25 | 11 July 2022 | Falmer Stadium, Brighton and Hove, England | Norway | 5–0 | 8–0 | UEFA Euro 2022 | |
| 26 | 11 July 2022 | Falmer Stadium, Brighton and Hove, England | Norway | 8–0 | 8–0 | UEFA Euro 2022 | |
| 27 | 15 July 2022 | St Mary's Stadium, Southampton, England | Northern Ireland | 2–0 | 5–0 | UEFA Euro 2022 | |
| 28 | 26 July 2022 | Bramall Lane, Sheffield, England | Sweden | 1–0 | 4–0 | UEFA Euro 2022 | |
| 29 | 6 September 2022 | Bet365 Stadium, Stoke-on-Trent, England | Luxembourg | 5–0 | 10–0 | 2023 FIFA World Cup qualification | |
| 30 | 5 December 2023 | Hampden Park, Glasgow, Scotland | Scotland | 4–0 | 6–0 | 2023–24 UEFA Nations League A | |
| 31 | 23 February 2024 | Estadio Nuevo Mirador, Algeciras, Spain | Austria | 3–1 | 7–2 | Friendly | |
| 32 | 23 February 2024 | Estadio Nuevo Mirador, Algeciras, Spain | Austria | 6–2 | 7–2 | Friendly | |
| 33 | 31 May 2024 | St James' Park, Newcastle, England | France | 1–0 | 1–2 | UEFA Euro 2025 qualification | |
| 34 | 8 April 2025 | Den Dreef, Leuven, Belgium | Belgium | 1–3 | 2–3 | 2025 UEFA Nations League A | |
| 35 | 30 May 2025 | Wembley Stadium, London, England | Portugal | 4–0 | 6–0 | 2025 UEFA Nations League A | |
| 36 | 29 June 2025 | King Power Stadium, Leicester, England | Jamaica | 7–0 | 7–0 | Friendly | |
| 37 | 13 July 2025 | Kybunpark, St. Gallen, Switzerland | Wales | 5–0 | 6–1 | UEFA Euro 2025 | |
| 38 | 29 November 2025 | Wembley Stadium, London, England | China | 1–0 | 8–0 | Friendly | |
| 39 | 29 November 2025 | Wembley Stadium, London, England | China | 2–0 | 8–0 | Friendly | |
| 40 | 9 June 2026 | Hill Dickinson Stadium, Liverpool, England | Ukraine | 3–0 | 3–0 | 2027 FIFA World Cup qualification | |

== Honours ==
Sunderland

- Women's Super League 2: 2014
- Women's Premier League: 2011–12, 2012–13 (Note: From 2010 to 2013 the Women's Premier League was demoted to level 2 of english women's football below the Women's Super League meaning at this time it was no longer the top tier championship.)
- Women's Premier League Cup: 2011–12

Arsenal

- Women's Super League: 2018–19
- Women's FA Cup runners-up: 2017–18, 2020–21
- Women's League Cup: 2017–18, 2022–23, 2023–24; runners-up: 2018–19, 2019–20
- UEFA Women's Champions League: 2024–25
- FIFA Women's Champions Cup: 2026

England

- UEFA Women's Championship: 2022, 2025
- Arnold Clark Cup: 2022
- SheBelieves Cup: 2019

England U19

- UEFA Women's Under-19 Championship runner-up: 2013

Individual

- WPL Golden Boot: 2011–12, 2012–13
- Sunderland Forward of the Decade: 2011–2020
- Sunderland Team of the Decade: 2011–2020
- Sunderland Player of the Year: 2011–12, 2012–13, 2015–16
- UEFA Women's Under-19 Championship Silver Boot: 2013
- England Young Player of the Year: 2015, 2018
- North East FWA Player of the Year: 2015
- WSL Player of the Season: 2015
- WSL Golden Boot: 2015
- PFA Young Player of the Year: 2015–16
- PFA Team of the Year: 2015–16, 2017–18
- WSL Top Assist Provider: 2018–19, 2021–22
- WSL Goal of the Season: 2018–19
- FSA Player of the Year: 2018, 2022
- WSL Player of the Month: March 2019, April 2019, September 2021
- Ballon d'Or Féminin runner-up: 2021–22
- UEFA Player of the Year runner-up: 2021–22
- England Player of the Year: 2021–22
- Arsenal Player of the Season: 2021–22
- Arsenal Supporters Club Player of the Season: 2021–22
- PFA Fan's Player of the Month: November 2021, September 2022
- BBC Women's Footballer of the Year: 2022
- World Soccer World Player of the Year: 2022
- The Guardian 100 Best Footballers in the World runner-up: 2022
- IFFHS World's Best Player runner-up: 2022
- FIFA FIFPRO Women's World 11: 2022
- IFFHS World Team: 2022
- UEFA Women's Championship Player of the Tournament: 2022
- UEFA Women's Championship Golden Boot: 2022
- UEFA Women's Championship Top Assist Provider: 2022
- UEFA Women's Championship Team of the Tournament: 2022
- Arsenal Player of the Month: September 2022

Media

- BBC Sports Personality of the Year: 2022
- AIPS European Sportswoman of the Year runner-up: 2022
- SJA Sportswoman of the Year: 2022
- Yorkshire Young Achievers Personality of the Year: 2022
- Yorkshire Sports Performer of the Year: 2022
- Yorkshire Post Sports Hero of the Year: 2019
- Scarborough and District Sports Awards
  - Special Achievement Award: 2023
  - Top Female Achiever: 2013, 2014, 2015
  - Mavis Clayton Memorial Trophy for Outstanding Achievement: 2012
- SportsByte Sports Person of the Year: 2014, 2015

State and civic honours

- Member of the Order of the British Empire (MBE) for services to association football: 2023 New Year Honours
- Freedom of the Borough of Scarborough: 2023
- Freedom of the City of London: 2022

Records

As of 14 March 2026

Continental

- Most goals in a single edition of the UEFA Women's Championship: 6 (2022)

England

- Most goals for England in a season by either gender: 20 (2021–22)
- First English player of either gender to win both the Golden Boot and Player of the Tournament at the Euros or World Cup (UEFA Women's Euro 2022)
- Most goals at a single major tournament by an England player of either gender: 6 (UEFA Women's Euro 2022)
- First woman to score a hat-trick at Wembley for England (23 October 2021 vs Northern Ireland)

Women's Super League

- All-time most assists: 54
- All-time second-most goal contributions: 125
- Most assists in a season: 12 (2018–19)
- Most chances created in a season: 72 (2021–22)
- Most chances created from open play in a season: 54+ (2021–22)
- First player to create 50 open play chances in a single season (2021–22)
- Second-most chances created in a calendar year: 46 (2022)
- Youngest Golden Boot winner: 20 (2015)
- Most goals in the first ten games for a club: 11 (2015)
- Most Player of the Month awards: 3 (March 2019, April 2019, September 2021)
- Second-fastest hat-trick: 18 minutes (18 July 2015 vs Chelsea)
- Most combined goals between two players: 22 (with Vivianne Miedema)

Other

- First women's footballer to win the BBC Sports Personality of the Year Award (2022)
- First Arsenal and former or current Sunderland player of either gender to win the BBC Sports Personality of the Year Award (2022)
- Second out LGBTQ+ player to win the BBC Sports Personality of the Year Award (2022)
- Second English footballer of either gender to win the World Soccer World Player of the Year award. (2022)
- First footballer to win the SJA Sportswoman of the Year award (2022)
- First women's footballer to be shortlisted in Fans' Footballer of the Year (2022)

== See also ==
- List of FA WSL hat-tricks
- FA WSL records and statistics
- List of England women's international footballers
