= Women's Super League records and statistics =

Records of Women's Super League

As of end of 2024–25 season.

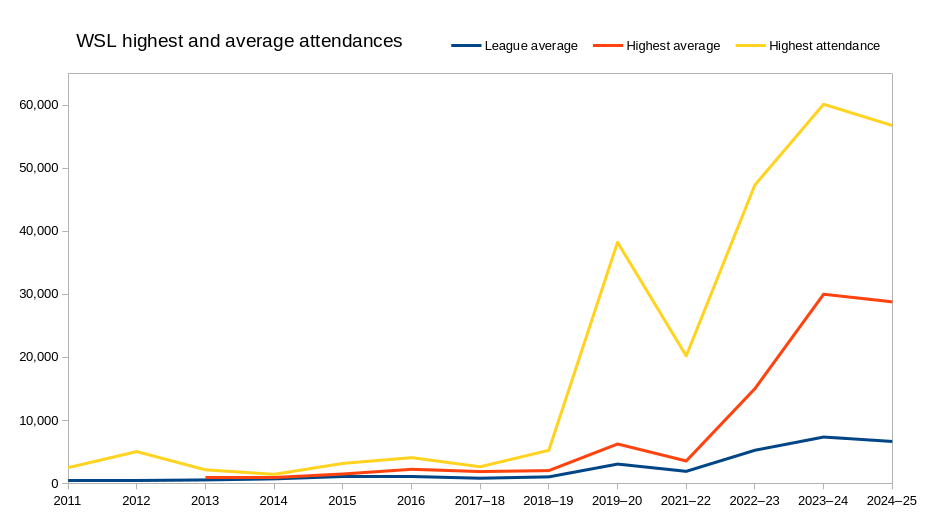
WSL highest and average attendances 2011–2025

The following is a list of records and statistics of the Women's Super League (WSL) — the highest level of women's football in England — since its inception in 2011. Barring total appearances, all statistics exclude the 2017 FA WSL Spring Series, which bridged the gap between the 2016 and 2017–18 season, featuring only 8 games for each team. Many league record team statistics only cover 22 and 14 game seasons, (Note: Such as those related to points, goals, wins and losses) as they have been featured in the league at least more than once.

Chelsea have won the most titles with 8 alongside the most consecutive wins, biggest title-winning margin, most points and most goals in a season. Since the 2022–23 season, Arsenal have held the record for the highest average attendance per season and highest attendance game, breaking the record three more times during the 2023–24 season. The club has the top three highest attendances in the WSL, all made at the Emirates Stadium, with the highest league attendance now set at 60,160 after the February 2024 match against Manchester United. Arsenal previously held the attendance record from 2012 until 2019 in a match against Chelsea with a crowd of 5,052. The club also holds the match record for the biggest win and highest scoring match with 11–1 against Bristol City in the 2019–20 season. Bristol City have experienced the most defeats in a season with 18 and Reading the most draws with 9.

Vivianne Miedema holds numerous player records including the most WSL goals and goal contributions, most goals scored in a season with 22 (shared with Rachel Daly), and quickest to reach 50 and 100 goals in the league. Further achievements include most goals scored in a single match with 6, most goal involvements in a game with 10, most assists in a match with 4, and most hat-tricks in a season with 3. Only Khadija Shaw, who has also won two golden boots, has more WSL hat-tricks than Miedema with 6. Beth Mead has provided the most assists and the most assists in a single season with 12, Jordan Nobbs has made the most WSL appearances with 210, and Mary Earps has the most cleansheets with 56. Millie Bright has won the most titles as a player with 8, all of which were with Chelsea, and Emma Hayes as a manager has won the most titles with 7, also with Chelsea.

== List of seasons ==
The following lists the season lengths of all seasons of the WSL thus far:

- 22-game seasons: 2020–21, 2021–22, 2022–23, 2023–24, 2024–25
- 15-game season: 2019–20; this season was cut short due to the COVID-19 pandemic
- 20-game season: 2018–19
- 18-game season: 2017–18
- 16-game season: 2016
- 14-game season: 2011, 2012, 2013, 2014, 2015

== League records ==
=== Titles ===
- Most titles: 8, Chelsea (2015, 2017–18, 2019–20, 2020–21, 2021–22, 2022–23, 2023–24, 2024–25)
- Most consecutive title wins: 6, Chelsea (2019–20, 2020–21, 2021–22, 2022–23, 2023–24, 2024–25)
- Biggest title-winning margin: 12 points, Chelsea (2024–25)
- Smallest title-winning margin: 0 points, +2 goal difference (2014); Liverpool (+9) over Chelsea (+7). Both finished on 26 points, but Liverpool won the title on goal difference. Excluding the 2017 FA WSL Spring Series, it is the only time the WSL has been decided on goal difference.
- Winning a title with most remaining games: 2, Chelsea (2024–25)

=== Points ===
- Most points in a season:
  - In a 22-game season: 60, Chelsea (2024–25)
  - In a 14-game season: 36, Liverpool (2013)
- Most home points in a season:
  - In a 22-game season: 33, Arsenal (2021–22) and Chelsea (2021–22, 2022–23)
  - In a 14-game season: 19, Arsenal (2012)
- Most away points in a season:
  - In a 22-game season: 29, Chelsea (2024–25)
  - In a 14-game season: 19, Arsenal (2013)
- Most points without winning the league:
  - In a 22-game season: 56, Manchester United (2022–23)
  - In a 14-game season: 31, Bristol Academy (2013)
- Fewest points in a season:
  - In a 22-game season: 6, Bristol City (2023–24)
  - In a 14-game season: 4, Everton (2014)
- Fewest home points in a season:
  - In a 22-game season: 0, Bristol City (2023–24)
  - In a 14-game season: 3, Everton (2014)
- Fewest away points in a season:
  - In a 22-game season: 0, Reading (2022–23)
  - In a 14-game season: 1, Everton (2014)
- Fewest points in a season while winning the league:
  - In a 22-game season: 55, Chelsea (2023–24)
  - In a 14-game season: 26, Liverpool (2014)
- Most points in a season while being relegated:
  - Performance-based relegation:
    - In a 22-game season: 12, Bristol City (2020–21)
    - In a 14-game season: 8, Bristol Academy (2015)
  - Relegated due to failure to obtain WSL licence: 16, Notts County (2016) — Notts County folded 2 days before the FA WSL Spring Series began.
- Fewest points in a season while avoiding relegation:
  - In a 22-game season: 13, Leicester City (2021–22)
  - In a 14-game season: 10, Chelsea, Lincoln Ladies (2013)
- Most points in a season by a team promoted in the previous season: 23, West Ham United (2018–19), Manchester United (2019–20) and Liverpool (2022–23)

=== Wins ===
- Most wins in a season:
  - In a 22-game season: 19, Chelsea (2022–23, 2024–25)
  - In a 14-game season: 12, Liverpool (2013)
- Most home wins in a season:
  - In a 22-game season: 11, Arsenal (2021–22) and Chelsea (2021–22, 2022–23)
  - In a 14-game season: 6, Arsenal (2011, 2012) and Liverpool (2013)
- Most away wins in a season:
  - In a 22-game season: 9, Arsenal (2018–19), Manchester United (2022–23) and Chelsea (2024–25)
  - In a 14-game season: 6, Arsenal (2013) and Liverpool (2013)
- Fewest wins in a season:
  - In a 22-game season: 1, Bristol City (2023–24)
  - In a 14-game season: 0, Everton (2014)
- Fewest home wins in a season:
  - In a 22-game season: 0, West Ham United (2020–21) and Birmingham City (2020–21) Bristol City (2023–24)
  - In a 14-game season: 0, Liverpool (2011, 2012) and Everton (2014)
- Fewest away wins in a season:
  - In a 22-game season: 0, Bristol City (2020–21), Liverpool (2022–23) and Reading (2022–23)
  - In a 14-game season: 0, Doncaster Rovers Belles (2013) and Everton (2014)
- Most consecutive wins: 14, Arsenal (2 March 2022 – 6 November 2022) and Manchester City (19 November 2023 – 28 April 2024)
- Most consecutive games without a win: 32, Yeovil Town (May 2017 – November 2018)
- Most consecutive wins within a season: 14, Manchester City (2023–24)
- Most consecutive wins from the start of a season: 9, Arsenal (2018–19) and Chelsea (2024–25)
- Most consecutive wins to the end of a season: 9, Chelsea (2021–22) and Manchester City (2021–22)
- Most consecutive home wins: 15, Chelsea (13 March 2022 – 21 May 2023)
- Most consecutive away wins: 12, Manchester City (4 July 2016 – 28 January 2018)
- Most consecutive games without a win from the start of a season: 18, Yeovil Town (2017–18)
- Fastest team to reach 100 wins: Manchester City (2014 – 23 March 2022)

=== Defeats ===
- Most defeats in a season:
  - In a 22-game season: 18, Bristol City (2023–24)
  - In a 14-game season: 11, Liverpool (2012)
- Most home defeats in a season:
  - In a 22-game season: 11, Bristol City (2023–24)
  - In a 14-game season: 7, Liverpool (2012)
- Most away defeats in a season:
  - In a 22-game season: 11, Reading (2022–23)
  - In a 14-game season: 6, Chelsea (2013) and Everton (2014)
- Fewest defeats in a season:
  - In a 22-game season: 0, Chelsea (2024–25)
  - In a 14-game season: 0, Arsenal (2012)
- Fewest home defeats in a season:
  - In a 22-game season: 0, Manchester City (2020–21, 2022–23), Arsenal (2021–22) and Chelsea (2021–22, 2022–23, 2024–25)
  - In a 14-game season: 0, Arsenal (2012), Everton (2012) and Chelsea (2014)
- Fewest away defeats in a season:
  - In a 22-game season: 0, Chelsea (2020–21, 2024–25)
  - In a 14-game season: 0, Birmingham City (2011) and Arsenal (2012, 2013, 2015)
- Most consecutive games undefeated: 33, Chelsea (10 February 2019 – 31 January 2021)
- Most consecutive home games undefeated: 33, Manchester City (1 April 2018 – 2 May 2021) and Chelsea (10 February 2021 – 4 February 2024)
- Most consecutive away games undefeated: 39, Chelsea (31 May 2017 – 5 May 2021)
- Most consecutive defeats: 12, Yeovil Town (24 August 2017 – 13 April 2018)

=== Draws ===
- Most draws in a season:
  - In a 22-game season: 9, Reading (2020–21)
  - In a 14-game season: 6, Bristol Academy (2012) and Notts County (2014)
- Most home draws in a season:
  - In a 22-game season: 5, Reading (2020–21)
  - In a 14-game season: 4, Birmingham City (2015)
- Most away draws in a season:
  - In a 22-game season: 5, Liverpool (2022–23)
  - In a 14-game season: 4, Bristol City (2012) and Liverpool (2014)
- Fewest draws in a season:
  - In a 22-game season: 1, Leicester City (2021–22, 2022–23), Chelsea (2022–23, 2023–24) and Manchester City (2023–24)
  - In a 14-game season: 0, Liverpool (2013)
- Fewest home draws in a season:
  - In a 22-game season: 0, Brighton & Hove Albion and Chelsea (2020–21, 2022–23, 2023–24), Bristol City (2023–24) and Tottenham Hotspur (2024–25)
  - In a 14-game season: 0, Arsenal (2011, 2015), Liverpool (2012, 2013, 2015), Bristol City (2013, 2014), Manchester City (2014)
- Fewest away draws in a season:
  - In a 22-game season: 0, Manchester United (2020–21), Leicester City (2021–22), Brighton & Hove Albion (2021–22) and Reading (2022–23)
  - In a 14-game season: 0, Chelsea (2012, 2013, 2014), Lincoln Ladies (2012) Liverpool (2013) and Birmingham City (2015)
- Most consecutive draws: 5, Birmingham City (30 August 2012 – 15 May 2013)
- Most consecutive games without a draw: 46, Arsenal (21 April 2018 – 8 November 2020)

=== Goals ===
- Most goals scored in a season:
  - In a 22-game season: 71, Chelsea (2023–24)
  - In a 14-game season: 46, Liverpool (2013)
- Fewest goals scored in a season:
  - In a 22-game season: 13, Aston Villa (2021–22)
  - In a 14-game season: 7, Birmingham City (2015)
- Most goals conceded in a season:
  - In a 22-game season: 72, Bristol City (2020–21)
  - In a 14-game season: 42, Doncaster Rovers Bells (2013)
- Fewest goals conceded in a season:
  - In a 22-game season: 10, Chelsea (2020–21), Arsenal (2021–22)
  - In a 14-game season: 8, Notts County (2014)
- Best goal difference in a season:
  - In a 22-game season: +59, Chelsea (2020–21)
  - In a 14-game season: +27, Liverpool (2013)
- Worst goal difference in a season:
  - In a 22-game season: −54, Bristol City (2020–21)
  - In a 14-game season: −33, Doncaster Rovers Bells (2013)
- Highest finish with a negative goal difference:
  - In a 22-game season: 5th, Brighton & Hove Albion (2024–25)
  - In a 14-game season: 4th, Birmingham City (2013)
- Lowest finish with a positive goal difference:
  - In a 22-game season: 5th, Everton (2020–21), Tottenham Hotspur (2021–22), Aston Villa (2022–23) and Manchester United W.F.C. (2023–24)
  - In a 14-game season: 6th, Notts County (2014)
- Most goals scored in a season by a relegated team:
  - In a 22-game season: 23, Reading (2022–23)
  - In a 14-game season: 12, Bristol City (2015)
- Most goals scored at home in a season:
  - In a 22-game season: 42, Chelsea (2020–21)
  - In a 14-game season: 20, Arsenal (2014)
- Fewest goals scored at home in a season:
  - In a 22-game season: 5, Aston Villa (2020–21), Birmingham City (2021–22), Aston Villa (2021–22)
  - In a 14-game season: 2, Birmingham City (2015)
- Most goals conceded at home in a season:
  - In a 22-game season: 33, Bristol City (2021–22), Brighton & Hove Albion (2022–23)
  - In a 14-game season: 27, Doncaster Rovers Bells (2013)
- Fewest goals conceded at home in a season:
  - In a 22-game season: 3, Manchester United (2024–25)
  - In a 14-game season: 2, Arsenal (2011)
- Most goals scored away in a season:
  - In a 22-game season: 33, Chelsea (2023–24)
  - In a 14-game season: 27, Liverpool (2013)
- Fewest goals scored away in a season:
  - In a 22-game season: 4, Leicester City (2021–22, 2022–23)
  - In a 14-game season: 4, Doncaster Rovers Bells (2011, 2012)
- Most goals conceded away in a season:
  - In a 22-game season: 39, Bristol City (2020–21, 2023–24)
  - In a 14-game season: 17, Everton (2013)
- Fewest goals conceded away in a season:
  - In a 22-game season: 4, Chelsea (2020–21)
  - In a 14-game season: 5, Arsenal (2013), Notts County (2014)
- Most consecutive matches scored in: 59, Chelsea (28 October 2018 – 21 November 2021)
- Most different individual goal scorers in one match by a single team: 9, Chelsea (against Bristol City, 2020–21)
- Longest consecutive run of matches without conceding a goal: 10, (Arsenal, 13 March 2021 – 23 October 2022)
- Matches played with 6 or more goals scored in the second half: Arsenal 11–1 Bristol City (2019–20), Brighton & Hove Albion 0–6 Manchester City (2021–22) Crystal Palace F.C. 0-7 Chelsea F.C.
- Most shots on target in a match: 22, Chelsea (against Yeovil Town, April 2017)
- First team to score 3 goals in the opening 10 minutes of a game: Chelsea (against Leicester City, March 2022)

=== Disciplinary ===
- Most yellow cards in a season: 43, Brighton & Hove Albion (2024–25)
- Most red cards in a season: 4, Manchester City (2023–24)
- Most penalties awarded to a team in a season: 6, Manchester City (2017–18)
- Most penalties conceded by a team in a season: 7, Yeovil Town (2017–18)

=== Attendances ===
- Highest attendance, single game: 60,160, Arsenal 3–1 Manchester United (at Emirates Stadium, 17 February 2024)
- Lowest attendance, single game: 105, Liverpool 1–4 Bristol Academy (at West Lancashire College Stadium, 8 April 2012)
- Highest season league average attendance: 7,363 (2023–24 WSL)

Top attendances

	Date	Fixture	Results	Venue	Attendance	Season	Ref
1st place, gold medalist(s)	17 February 2024	Arsenal vs Manchester United	3–1	Emirates Stadium	60,160	2023–24	
2nd place, silver medalist(s)	3 March 2024	Arsenal vs Tottenham Hotspur	1–0	Emirates Stadium	60,050	2023–24	
3rd place, bronze medalist(s)	10 December 2023	Arsenal vs Chelsea	4–1	Emirates Stadium	59,042	2023–24	

Record progression

Date	Fixture	Results	Venue	Attendance	Season	Held for (Note: How long the record attendance was held for)	Ref
13 April 2011	Chelsea vs Arsenal	0–1	Imperial Fields	2,510 (Note: Inaugural game of the Women's Super League)	2011	1 year and 13 days	
26 April 2012	Arsenal vs Chelsea	3–1	Emirates Stadium	5,052	2012	7 years and 3 days	
29 April 2019	Brighton & Hove Albion vs Arsenal	0–4	Amex Stadium	5,265	2018–19	4 months and 9 days	
7 September 2019	Manchester City vs Manchester United	1–0	City of Manchester Stadium	31,213	2019–20	2 months and 10 days	
17 November 2019	Tottenham Hotspur vs Arsenal	0–2	Tottenham Hotspur Stadium	38,262	2019–20	2 years, 10 months and 7 days	
24 September 2022	Arsenal vs Tottenham Hotspur	4–0	Emirates Stadium	47,367	2022-23	1 year and 7 days	
1 October 2023	Arsenal vs Liverpool	0–1	Emirates Stadium	54,115	2023–24	2 months and 9 days	
10 December 2023	Arsenal vs Chelsea	4–1	Emirates Stadium	59,042	2023–24	2 months and 7 days	
17 February 2024	Arsenal vs Manchester United	3–1	Emirates Stadium	60,160	2023–24	2 years and 9 months	

Average attendances

Attendance broke the previous WSL record
Attendance broke the previous club record

Season	League average	Highest average		Highest attendance game	
Season	League average	Club	Attendance	Game	Attendance
2011	550			Chelsea vs Arsenal	2,510
2012	550			Arsenal vs Chelsea	5,052
2013	562	Bristol City	911	Liverpool vs Bristol City	2,165
2014	728	Manchester City	949	Birmingham City vs Notts County	1,448
2015	1,076	Manchester City	1,500	Manchester City vs Notts County	3,180
2016	1,128	Manchester City	2,249	Manchester City vs Chelsea	4,096
2017–18	828	Chelsea	1,884	Chelsea vs Manchester City	2,648
2018–19	1,047	Chelsea	2,040	Brighton & Hove Albion vs Arsenal	5,265
2019–20 (Note: Due to the COVID-19 pandemic, the season was ended prematurely.)	3,072	Tottenham Hotspur	6,258	Tottenham Hotspur vs Arsenal	38,262
2020–21	No attendances because of COVID-19 pandemic				
2021–22	1,924	Manchester United	3,567	Manchester United vs Everton	20,241
2022–23	5,272	Arsenal	15,046	Arsenal vs Tottenham Hotspur	47,367
2023–24	7,363	Arsenal	30,017	Arsenal vs Manchester United	60,160
2024–25	6,662	Arsenal	28,808	Arsenal vs Tottenham Hotspur	56,784
2025–26	6,911	Arsenal	33,808	Arsenal vs Chelsea	56,537

== Player records ==
=== Appearances ===
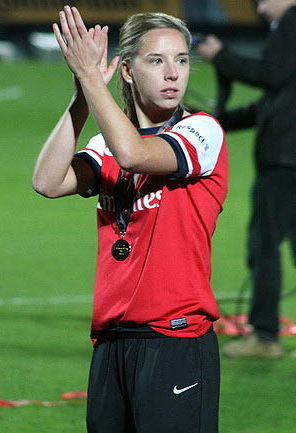
Record league appearance maker Jordan Nobbs played in the WSL from the inaugural 2011 season until the 2024–25 season.

- Most WSL appearances: 219, Drew Spence
- Most WSL appearances as a teenager: 54, Maya Le Tissier
- Most different clubs played for in WSL: 7, Lucy Staniforth (for Lincoln, Bristol Academy, Liverpool, Sunderland, Birmingham City, Manchester United, Aston Villa)
- Oldest player appearance: 41 years and 134 days, Becky Easton (Liverpool, 2015)
- Youngest player appearance: 16 years and 30 days, Lauren James (Arsenal, 2017–18)
- Most seasons appeared in: 17, Drew Spence (2011 to present)
- Most wins within first 50 games: 39, Vivianne Miedema, Lia Wälti, Guro Reiten
- Most consecutive WSL starts for a single club: 82, Maya Le Tissier

=== Goals ===
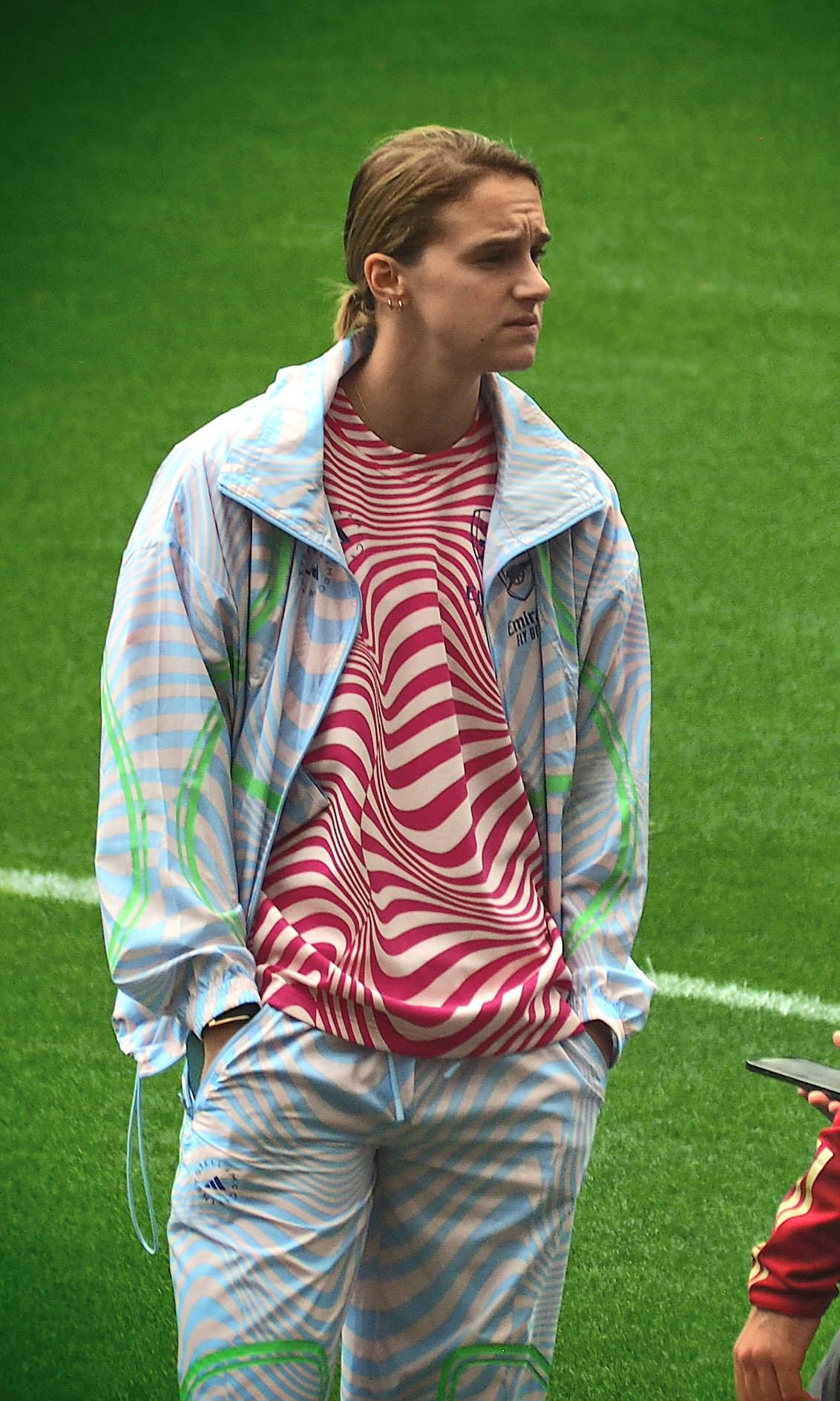
All-time leading league goal scorer Vivianne Miedema holds the joint-record most goals in a season with 22.

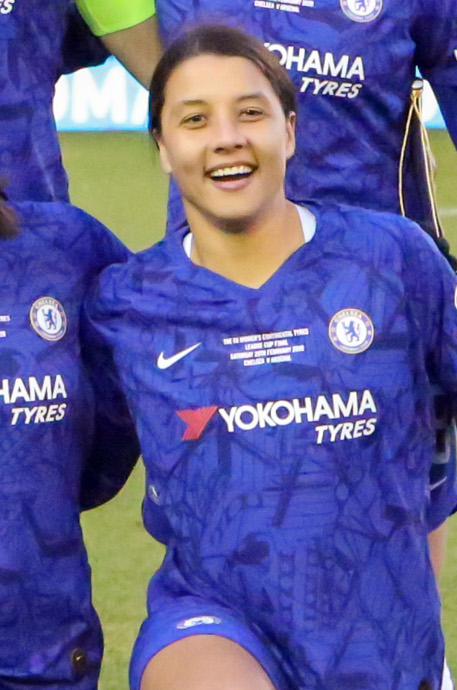
Sam Kerr is the only player to have scored at least 20 goals in consecutive seasons. In the 2021–22 season, Kerr scored against the most teams and scored the most headers.

- First WSL goal: Gilly Flaherty (for Arsenal v. Chelsea, 13 April 2011)
- Fastest WSL goal: 12 seconds, Jane Ross (for Manchester City v. Doncaster Rovers Bells, 11 August 2016)
- Youngest goal scorer: 16 years and 180 days, Issy Hobson
- Oldest goal scorer: 41 years and 87 days, Becky Easton
- Most WSL goals: 97, Vivianne Miedema
- Most WSL goals at one club: 80, Vivianne Miedema (for Arsenal)
- Most goal contributions: 136, Vivianne Miedema
- Most goals in a season: 22, Vivianne Miedema (2017–18) and Rachel Daly (2022–23)
- Most goals in WSL full season debut: 21, Sam Kerr (2020–21)
- Most goals in a calendar year: 23, Sam Kerr (2021)
- Quickest to reach 50 goals: Vivianne Miedema (in 50 games)
- Quickest to reach 100 goal involvements: Vivianne Miedema (in 83 games)
- Most teams scored against in a season: 10, Sam Kerr (2021–22)
- Most consecutive games scoring against the same opposition: 7, Vivianne Miedema (for Arsenal v. Reading)
- Most different clubs to score for in WSL: 6, Lucy Staniforth (for Lincoln, Bristol Academy, Sunderland, Birmingham City, Manchester United, Aston Villa)
- Most consecutive games scored in: 9, Bethany England (29 November 2019 to 23 February 2020)
- Most consecutive seasons to score at least 10 goals: 4, Vivianne Miedema (2018–19 to 2021–22)
- Most consecutive seasons to score at least 15 goals: 3, Vivianne Miedema (2018–19 to 2020–21)
- Most consecutive seasons to score at least 20 goals: 2, Sam Kerr (2020–21 to 2021–22)
- Most goals in a calendar month: 10, Vivianne Miedema (December 2019)
- Most penalties scored: 17, Kim Little
- Most combined goals between two players: 22, Beth Mead and Vivianne Miedema (2017–18 to 2022–23)
- Most combined goals between two players in a season: 12, Fran Kirby and Sam Kerr (2020–21)
- Most goals scored as headers: 17, Bethany England
- Most goals scored as a headers in one season: 9, Sam Kerr (2020–21)
- Players who have scored against every team they have faced: Sam Kerr, Vivianne Miedema, Bethany England

==== Hat tricks & multiple goal records ====
Most Hat-tricks

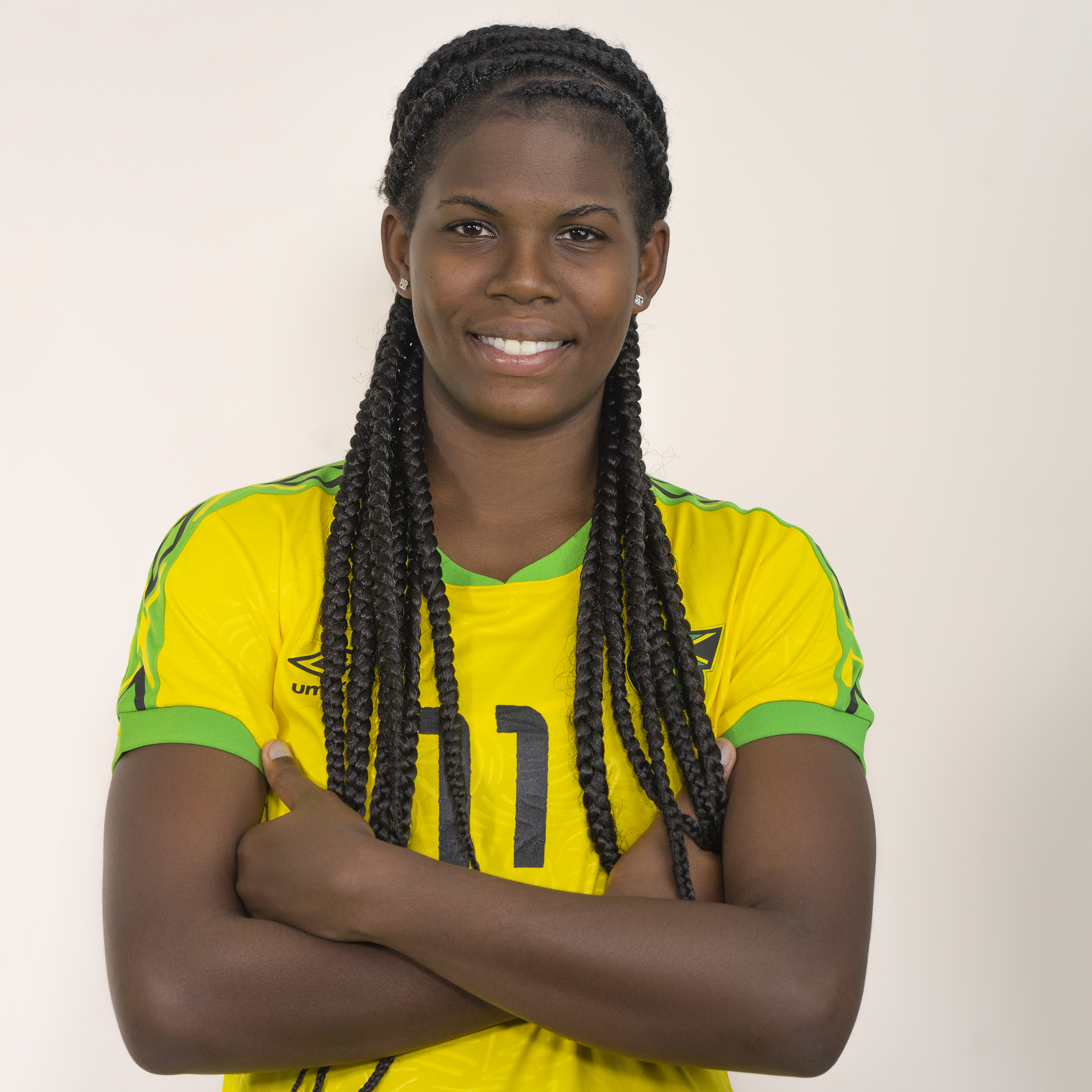
Three-time WSL Golden Boot winner Khadija Shaw holds the record for the most hat-tricks in the league.

Rank	Player	Club(s)	Hat-tricks
1	(Jamaica) Khadija Shaw	Manchester City	9
2	(Netherlands) Vivianne Miedema	Arsenal	5
3	Bethany England	Liverpool, Chelsea	3
3	(Australia) Sam Kerr	Chelsea	3
3	(England) Fran Kirby	Chelsea	3
6	(England) Rachel Daly	Aston Villa	2
6	(England) Natasha Dowie	Liverpool	2
6	(England) Toni Duggan	Everton, Manchester City	2
6	(England) Chloe Kelly	Everton, Arsenal	2
6	(England) Lauren James	Chelsea	2
6	(England) Nikita Parris	Manchester City	2
6	(Netherlands) Jill Roord	Arsenal	2
6	(England) Alessia Russo	Manchester United, Arsenal	2
6	(England) Georgia Stanway	Manchester City	2
6	(Scotland) Martha Thomas	West Ham United, Tottenham Hotspur	2
6	(England) Rachel Williams	Birmingham City	2

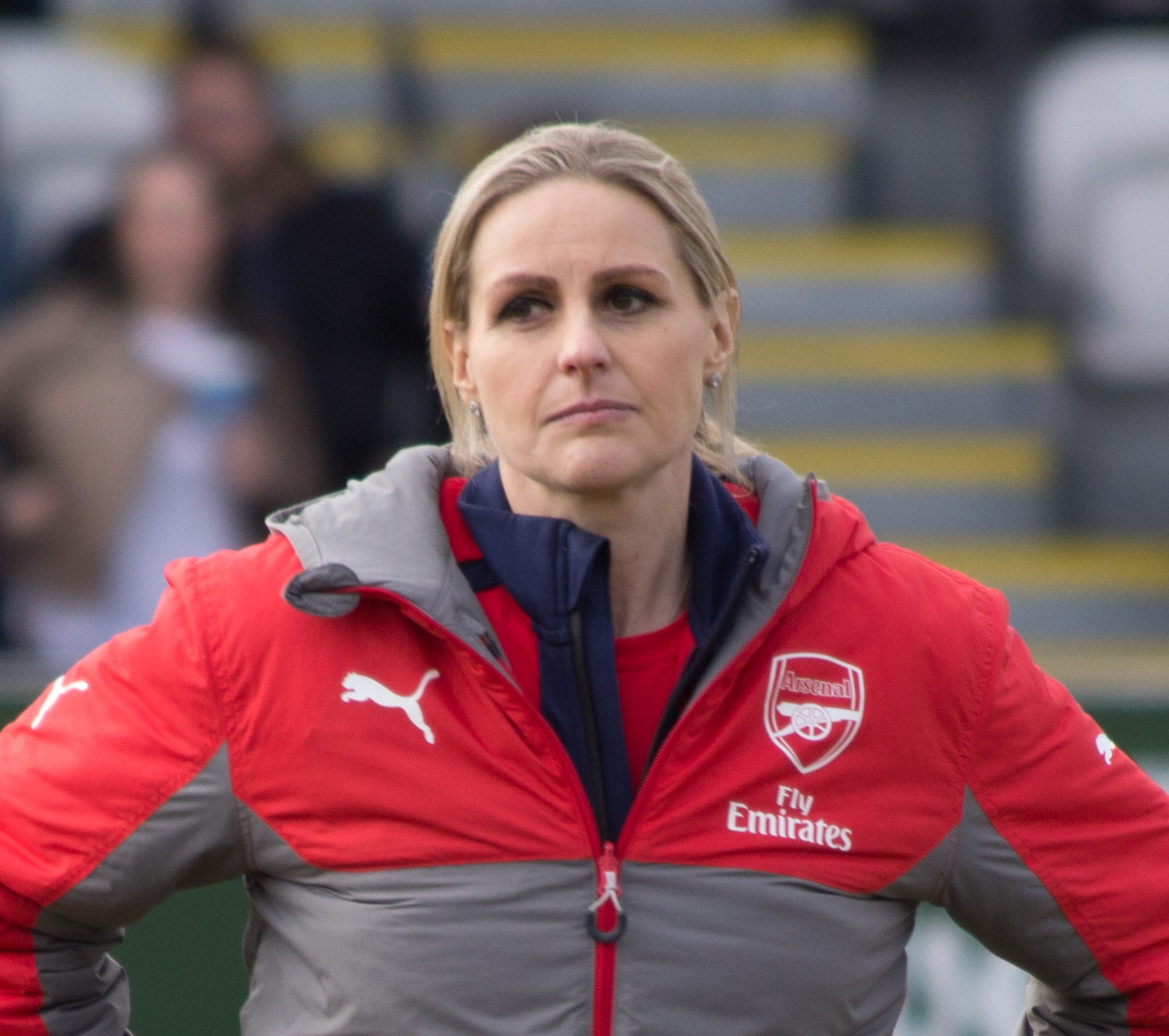
Former Arsenal forward Kelly Smith has held the record for the fastest hat-trick (16 minutes) from 2014 to 2026.

Fastest Hat-tricks
Minutes	Player	Match	Date	Ref.
13	(Jamaica) Khadija Shaw	Manchester City v Tottenham Hotspur	21 March 2026	
16	(England) Kelly Smith	Bristol Academy v Arsenal	20 September 2014	
18	(England) Beth Mead	Sunderland v Chelsea	18 July 2015	
18	(England) Toni Duggan	Bristol Academy v Manchester City	9 May 2017	
19	(England) Natasha Dowie	Doncaster Rovers Bells v Liverpool	15 September 2013	
21	(England) Kirsty Linnet	Sunderland v Birmingham City	6 November 2016	
21	(Netherlands) Vivianne Miedema	Arsenal v Bristol City	1 December 2019	
23	(Australia) Sam Kerr	Chelsea v Birmingham City	4 April 2021	
24	(Denmark) Olivia Holdt	Crystal Palace v Tottenham Hotspur	20 September 2026	
25	(Germany) Nicole Rolser	Liverpool v Birmingham City	1 September 2013	
26	(Australia) Sam Kerr	Chelsea v Birmingham City	21 November 2021	
26	Bethany England	Yeovil Town v Liverpool	6 January 2018	

Most 'perfect' hat-tricks
Rank	Player	For	Against	Date	Ref.
1	(Jamaica) Khadija Shaw	Manchester City	Tottenham Hotspur	5 March 2023	
1	(Jamaica) Khadija Shaw	Manchester City	Everton	17 December 2023	
1	(Jamaica) Khadija Shaw	Manchester City	West Ham United	7 November 2026	
2	(Netherlands) Vivianne Miedema	Arsenal	Liverpool	9 September 2018	
2	Bethany England	Chelsea	Yeovil Town	7 May 2019	
2	(England) Fran Kirby	Chelsea	Reading	10 January 2021	
2	(Australia) Hayley Raso	Everton	Brighton & Hove Albion	28 March 2021	

Other goal records

- Most goals scored in a match: 6, Vivianne Miedema (in Arsenal 11–1 Bristol City, 1 December 2019)
- Most goal involvements in a single game: 10, Vivianne Miedema (in Arsenal 11–1 Bristol City, 1 December 2019)
- Most WSL hat-tricks in a season: 3, Vivianne Miedema (2018–19)
- Most first half hat-tricks: 2, Vivianne Miedema (v. Bristol City and Tottenham Hotspur), Sam Kerr (v. Birmingham City (2))
- Most hat-tricks against a single club: 4
  - Khadija Shaw vs Tottenham (5 March 2023, 26 November 2023, 8 November 2024, and 21 March 2026)

=== Assists ===
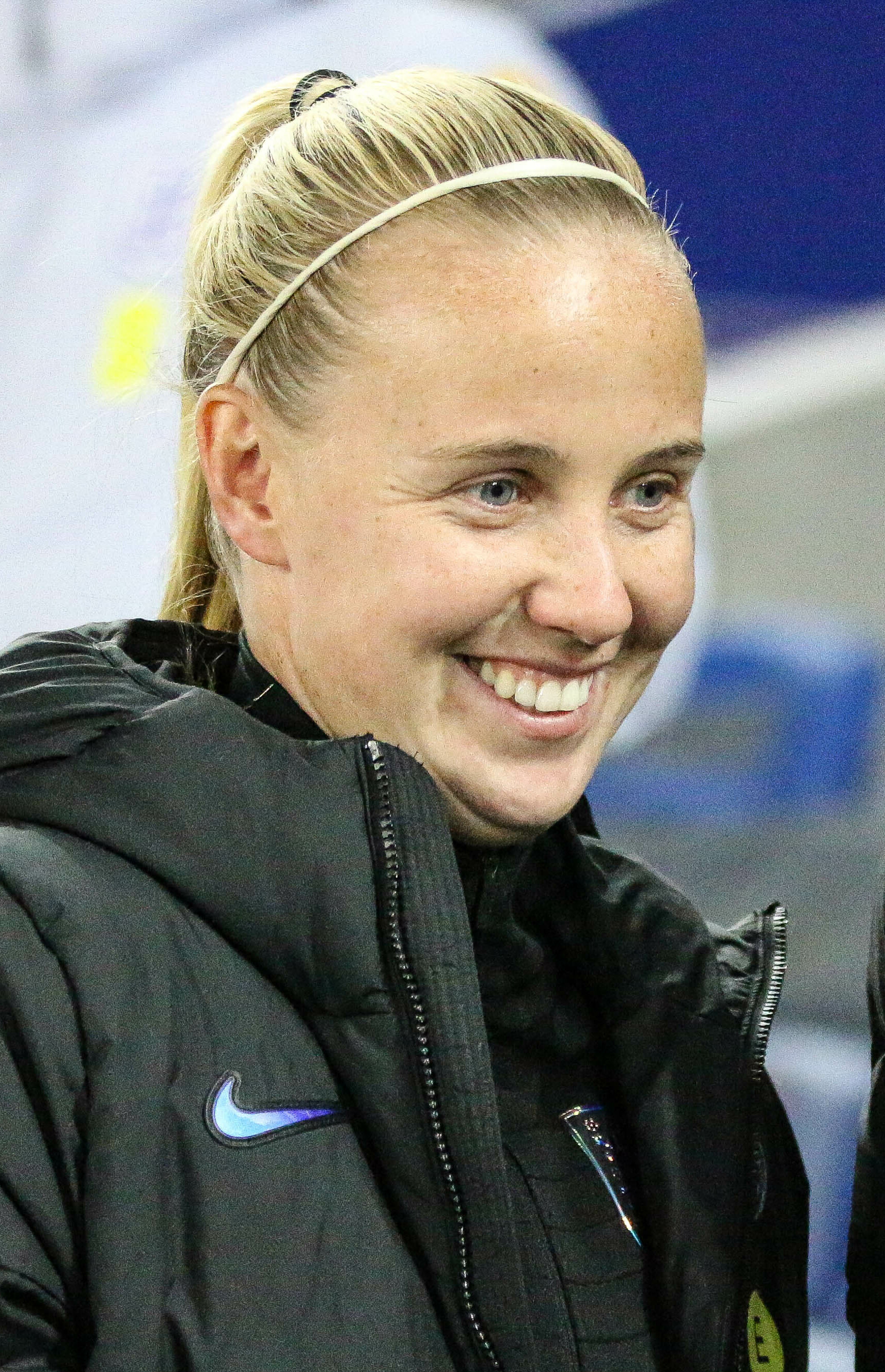
Beth Mead holds the record for most assists in the league and most assists in a single season.

- Most WSL assists: 54, Beth Mead
- Most WSL assists in a season: 12, Beth Mead (2018–19)
- Most assists in a single WSL match: 4, Vivianne Miedema (vs Bristol City),

=== Goalkeepers ===
- Most clean sheets: 56, Mary Earps
- Most clean sheets in one season: 14, Mary Earps (2022–23)
- Longest consecutive run without conceding a goal: 10, Manuela Zinsberger (13 March 2022 to 23 October 2022)

=== Disciplinary ===
- Most red cards: 4, Hawa Cissoko
- Most red cards in a single season: 2, Hawa Cissoko (2021–22)
- Most yellow cards: 37, Katie McCabe (2016–2025)
- Most yellow cards in a single season: 8, Katie McCabe (2021–22, 2023–24)

=== Awards ===
- Most WSL titles: 8,
  - Millie Bright (2015, 2017–18, 2019–20, 2020–21, 2021–22, 2022–23, 2023–24, 2024–25)
- Most WSL Player of the Month Awards: 4,
  - Alessia Russo (March 2022, April 2024, December 2024, March 2026)

== Match records ==
- Biggest win: Arsenal 11–1 Bristol City (2019–20)
- Biggest home win: Arsenal 11–1 Bristol City (2019–20)
- Biggest away win: Doncaster Rovers Belles 0–9 Liverpool (2013) & Leicester City 0–9 Chelsea (2021–22)
- Biggest aggregate win: Arsenal 15–1 Bristol City (Bristol City 0–4 Arsenal, Arsenal 11–1 Bristol City) (2019–20)
- Biggest loss by reigning champions: Chelsea 0–5 Arsenal (2018–19)
- Highest scoring: Arsenal 11–1 Bristol City (2019–20)

== All-time Women's Super League table ==
The all-time FA Women's Super League table is a cumulative record of all match results, points and goals of every team that has played in the FA WSL since its inception in 2011. The table that follows is accurate as of the end of the 2025–26 season (data does not include the 2017 FA WSL Spring Series). Numbers in bold are the record (highest either positive or negative) numbers in each column.

Pos.	Club	Seasons	Pld	Win	Draw	Loss	GF	GA	GD	Pts	1st	2nd	3rd	4th	Relegated	Best Pos.
1	Arsenal	**15**	**271**	**188**	41	42	**670**	231	**+439**	**602**	3	3	**8**	1		**1**
2	Chelsea	**15**	**271**	186	39	46	654	237	+417	597	**8**	2	2			**1**
3	Manchester City	12	226	163	29	38	564	196	+368	518	2	**6**	1	2		**1**
4	Manchester United	7	146	86	29	31	290	136	+154	287		1	1	**4**		2
5	Liverpool	13	226	78	40	108	294	360	−66	274	2			1	1	1
6	Everton	13	240	73	**47**	**120**	286	391	−105	266			2		1	3
7	Birmingham City	11	181	67	40	74	215	246	−31	240		2	1	**3**	1	2
8	Tottenham Hotspur	7	147	49	30	68	180	253	−73	177						5
9	Brighton & Hove Albion	8	168	47	30	91	186	327	−141	171						6
10	West Ham United	8	166	42	33	91	187	318	−131	159						6
11	Bristol City	10	166	42	31	93	168	**379**	−211	157		1		1	**3**	2
12	Reading	7	134	39	32	63	178	236	−58	149				1	1	4
13	Aston Villa	6	132	39	25	68	162	259	−97	142						5
14	Notts County	6	86	25	23	38	100	111	−11	98				1		4
15	Leicester City	5	110	20	16	74	87	235	−148	76					1	10
16	Sunderland	3	48	13	7	28	56	105	−49	46				1	1	4
17	Doncaster Rovers Belles	4	58	7	8	43	40	144	−104	29					2	7
18	London City Lionesses	1	22	8	3	11	28	35	−7	27						6
19	Crystal Palace	1	22	2	4	16	20	65	−45	10					1	12
20	Yeovil Town	2	38	2	3	33	13	114	−101	−1					1	10

- **Arsenal were deducted 3 points for fielding an unregistered player on 16 September 2013.**
- **Yeovil Town were deducted 10 points for entering administration on 28 March 2019.**
- **Birmingham City were deducted 1 point for fielding an ineligible player on 7 May 2021.**

League or status at 2026−2027:

League	level
2025–26 Women's Super League teams	1st
2025–26 Women's Super League 2 teams	2nd
2025–26 FA Women's National League Premier Division teams	3rd
2025–26 FA Women's National League Division One teams	4th
2025−26 FA Women's Regional Football Leagues and Below	5th-6th
Defunct teams	

== Managers ==
- Most WSL titles: 7, Emma Hayes (Chelsea — 2015, 2017–18, 2019–20, 2020–21, 2021–22, 2022–23, 2023–24)
- Most WSL Manager of the Month awards: 7, Emma Hayes (October 2019, January 2020, February 2020, January 2021, March 2022, November 2022, January 2024)
- Most WSL Manager of the Month awards in a single season: 3, Emma Hayes (Chelsea — 2019–20), Marc Skinner (Manchester United — 2022–23)
- Most wins as manager with a single WSL club: 151, Emma Hayes (Chelsea — 14 August 2012 to 18 May 2024)
- Most promotions to the WSL: 1,
  - Lauren Smith (Bristol City — 2022–23)
  - Matt Beard (Liverpool — 2021–22)
  - Jonathan Morgan (Leicester City — 2020–21)
  - Gemma Davies (Aston Villa — 2019–20)
  - Karen Hills & Juan Amaros (Tottenham Hotspur — 2018–19)
  - Casey Stoney (Manchester United — 2018–19)
  - Hope Powell (Brighton & Hove Albion — 2017–18)
  - Andy Spence (Everton — 2017)
  - Willie Kirk (Bristol City — 2016)
  - Jamie Sherwood (Yeovil Town — 2016)
  - Glen Harris (Doncaster Rovers Belles — 2015)
- Most relegations from the WSL: 1,
  - Darren Carter (Birmingham City — 2021–22)
  - Matthew Beard (Bristol City — 2020–21)
  - Vicky Jepson (Liverpool — 2019–20)
  - Lee Burch (Yeovil Town — 2018–19)
  - Emma Coates (Doncaster Rovers Belles — 2016)
  - Willie Kirk (Bristol Academy — 2015)
  - Andy Spence (Everton — 2014)
  - John Buckley (Doncaster Rovers Belles — 2013)
- Most clubs managed (excluding interim managers): 3, Matt Beard (Chelsea, Liverpool, West Ham United)
- Most games managed: 190, Emma Hayes (Chelsea — 14 August 2012 to 27 May 2024)
