= Esmeralda Negron =

Puerto Rican-American footballer, coach, and business executive

Esmeralda Negrón
Personal information
- Date of birth: 15 January 1983 (age 43)
- Place of birth: Harrington Park, New Jersey, United States
- Height: 1.68 m (5 ft 6 in)
- Position: Forward

College career
Years	Team	Apps	(Gls)
2001–2004	Princeton Tigers		

Senior career*
Years	Team	Apps	(Gls)
2002–2012	New Jersey Wildcats		
2005–2006	USCCO Compiegne		
2006–2007	FFC Brauweiler Pulheim		

International career^{‡}
- United States U-21
- United States U-23
2010	Puerto Rico	9	(6)
- * Club domestic league appearances and goals ‡ National team caps and goals as of 1 August 2010

Esmeralda Negrón (born 15 January 1983) is an American-born Puerto Rican retired footballer and current coach. She has been a member of the Puerto Rico women's national team. She was voted the second greatest Princeton University female athlete of the decade (2000–2010) for her time leading Princeton University women's soccer team.

== Early life ==
A native of Harrington Park, New Jersey, Negrón attended Northern Valley Regional High School at Old Tappan.

== College career ==
Princeton made the NCAA tournament in all four seasons Negrón was on the team, advancing to the second round in her freshman season of 2001. During her days at Princeton, Negrón scored 47 goals as part of her 112 career points, both Princeton records for both the men's and women's programs. The unforgettable season of 2004 saw Negrón score 20 goals with 12 assists for a total of 52 points, all Princeton single-season records, leading the Tigers to the NCAA Division I Women's Soccer Championship semifinals. She was a 2004 first-team All-America, a 2003 third-team All-America, a two-time Ivy League Player of the Year and a three-time first-team All-Ivy League selection. She won the von Kiensbusch Award her senior year as Princeton's top senior sportswoman.

Her Princeton career concluded with a record-breaking run to the NCAA Final Four in 2004 with then freshman teammate Diana Matheson, a member of the Canadian National Team. No other any Ivy League team has ever reached the NCAA Final Four of a 64-team tournament.

== Club career ==
Negrón played professionally for the New Jersey Lady Stallions and New Jersey Wildcats of the USL W-League.

== International career ==
During the summer of 2004, Negrón played internationally with the United States U-21 team in Iceland and was a member of the pool for the full U.S. National Soccer Team. However, in 2010, she played officially for Puerto Rico at senior level.

=== International goals ===
Scores and results list Puerto Rico's goal tally first

No.	Date	Venue	Opponent	Score	Result	Competition
1	19 March 2010	Juan Ramón Loubriel Stadium, Bayamón, Puerto Rico	Saint Kitts and Nevis	2–0	7–0	2010 CONCACAF Women's World Cup Qualifying qualification
2	19 March 2010	Juan Ramón Loubriel Stadium, Bayamón, Puerto Rico	Saint Kitts and Nevis	6–0	7–0	2010 CONCACAF Women's World Cup Qualifying qualification
3	19 March 2010	Juan Ramón Loubriel Stadium, Bayamón, Puerto Rico	Saint Kitts and Nevis	7–0	7–0	2010 CONCACAF Women's World Cup Qualifying qualification
4	13 May 2010	Manny Ramjohn Stadium, Marabella, Trinidad and Tobago	Antigua and Barbuda	3–0	8–0	2010 CONCACAF Women's World Cup Qualifying qualification
5	13 May 2010	Manny Ramjohn Stadium, Marabella, Trinidad and Tobago	Antigua and Barbuda	6–0	8–0	2010 CONCACAF Women's World Cup Qualifying qualification

== Coaching career ==
Negrón served as Assistant Coach for Seton Hall University and Princeton University women's soccer programs. After serving as Assistant Coach during Princeton's second Ivy League perfect season and second-best NCAA appearance of reaching the Round of 32, Negrón founded her own soccer training academy, Champions League Soccer Academy.

== Business ventures ==
In September 2020, Negron, along with sports media executive Hannah Brown, launched ata football, a streaming platform focused on women's football. It was acquired by DAZN Group on August 15, 2023.
