= 2022 BBC Sports Personality of the Year Award =

Sports award in the UK

BBC Sports Personality of the Year 2022
- Date: 21 December 2022
- Location: dock10 studios, Salford
- Country: United Kingdom
- Presented by: BBC
- Hosted by: Gary Lineker; Clare Balding; Gabby Logan; Alex Scott
- Winner: Beth Mead
- Website: BBC Sports Personality

Television/radio coverage
- Network: BBC One; BBC One HD

The 2022 BBC Sports Personality of the Year took place on 21 December 2022 at the dock10 studios in Salford. Co-hosted by Gary Lineker, Clare Balding, Gabby Logan, and Alex Scott, the event was broadcast live on BBC One. It paid tribute to Queen Elizabeth II and her interest in sport following her death in September of that year.

Beth Mead won the 2022 BBC Sports Personality of the Year Award, becoming the first female footballer to do so. 2019 Winner and England Cricket Test captain Ben Stokes was the runner-up, while curler Eve Muirhead finished third. The BBC do not release the actual voting statistics.

== Nominees ==
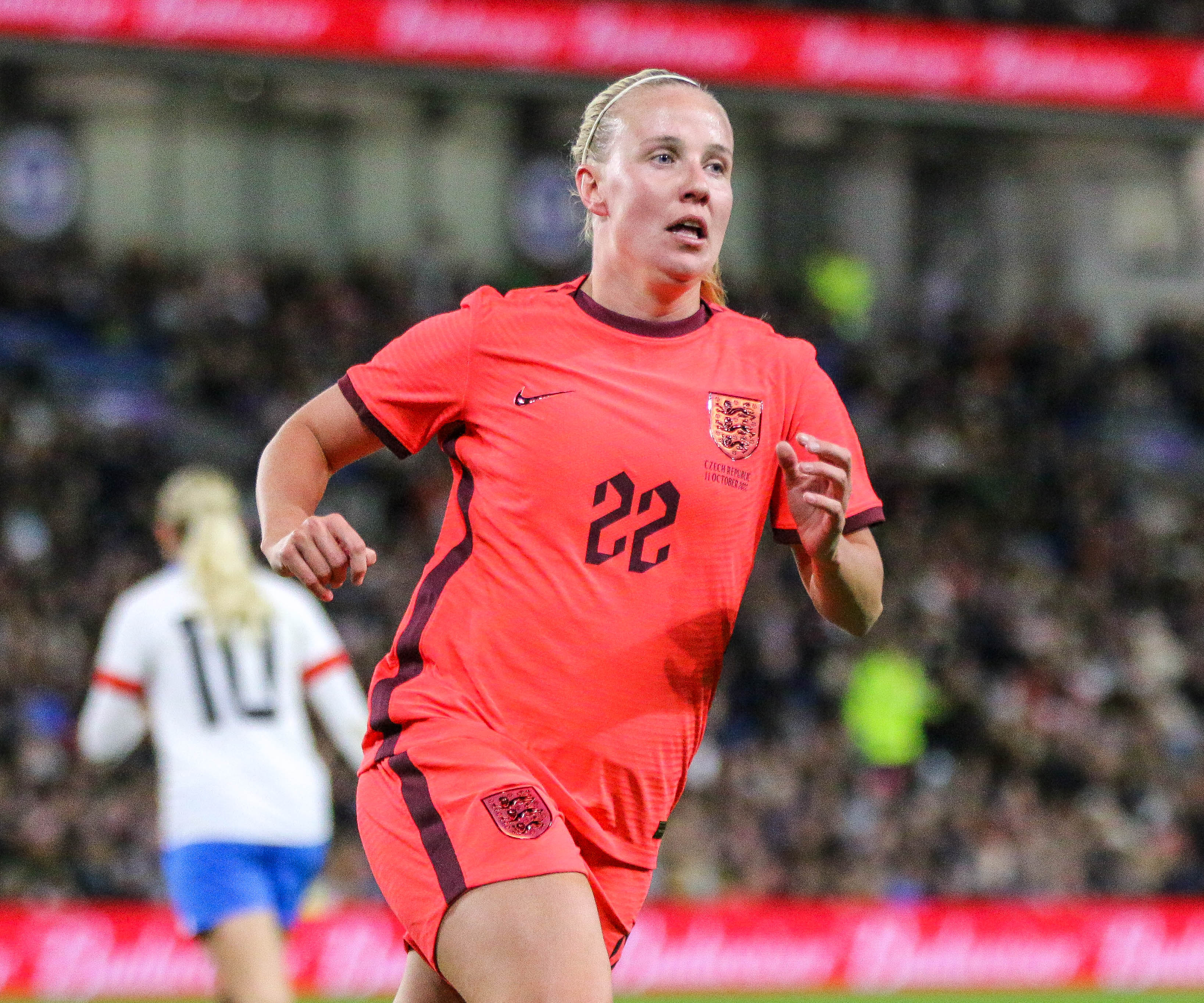
Beth Mead, the first female footballer to win the main award

The nominees for the award were revealed on 20 December 2022. The judging panel included athletes Denise Lewis, Kelly Gallagher, and Stephen Hendry, sports journalists Nancy Gillen, Jack Fox, and Tumaini Carayol, S4C's Head of Sports Sue Butler, UK Sport CEO Sally Munday, and from the BBC Barbara Slater, Philip Bernie, and Gabby Cook.

Beth Mead won the award, becoming the first female footballer, and the first footballer since Ryan Giggs in 2009, to win the award. She became the sixth footballer to win the award. Fellow footballer Jordan Henderson was the last to break into the top three, when he was runner-up in 2020. Cricketer Ben Stokes finished as runner-up behind Mead. He had previously won the award in 2019. Eve Muirhead finished in third place, becoming the first curler to finish in the top three, and the first participant from a winter sport in the top three since Torvill and Dean won in 1984. She was also the first Scot since Sir Andy Murray, who last won in 2016, to finish in the top three.

Baroness Grey-Thompson, who came third in the competition in 2000, announced the winner, whilst Sir Chris Hoy, who won in 2008, presented the awards.

Nominee	Sport	2022 Achievements
Beth Mead	Football	Was part of the England team win at the Euros, the first major trophy for the nation since 1966. Won the Golden Boot and Player of the Tournament Award at the tournament. Also broke a 61-year-old record for the most England goals in a season.
Ben Stokes	Cricket	Took over the captaincy of the England Test team, developing a new style of cricket, which led to series victories over New Zealand and South Africa at home and victory in Pakistan. Also part of the team which claimed victory in the T20 World Cup.
Eve Muirhead	Curling	At her fourth attempt, won gold at the Winter Olympics in the team event, in which she was the skip. It was Team GB's only gold of the games, and was won on the final day of events. Also won gold at the World Mixed Doubles Championship, securing a full set of major titles.
Jessica Gadirova	Gymnastics	Became World Champion on the floor at the World Championships, only the second British woman, and youngest ever Brit to do so. Took bronze in the all-around competition at the event. Also retained her European title on the floor at the European Championships.
Ronnie O'Sullivan	Snooker	Won the World Championships for a seventh time, equalling Stephen Hendry's record. In doing so, was the eldest World Champion and set a new record 74 wins at the Crucible.
Jake Wightman	Athletics	Won gold at the World Championships in the 1500m with a personal best. Followed it up with a bronze in the same event at the Commonwealth Games and a silver in the 800m at the European Championships.

== Other awards ==
=== Young Sports Personality of the Year ===
The Young Sports Personality of the Year had a shortlist of three, which was whittled down from ten, which also included cricketers Rehan Ahmed and Alice Capsey, wheelchair tennis player Ben Bartram, goalball player Chelsea Hudson, footballer Rico Lewis, netball player Jayda Pechova, and sports climber Toby Roberts. The judging panel consisted of athletes Ellen White, Max Whitlock, and Ellie Robinson, as well as representatives of Blue Peter, BBC Sport, and the Youth Sport Trust.

Jessica Gadirova had also been nominated for the main award of the evening. Sky Brown had won the award the previous year.

2008 winner Ellie Simmonds presented the award.

Winner and Nominees of the 2022 BBC Young Sports Personality of the Year Award
Nominee	Sport	2022 Achievement
Jessica Gadirova	Gymnastics	Became the first British female all-around medallist at the World Championships, where she also won a gold on the floor and a silver with the team.
Sky Brown	Skateboarding	Defended her title at the X Games, and secured the title weeks later at the Dew Tour.
Andrea Spendolini-Sirieix	Diving	Secured bronze in the team event at the World Championships, followed by two golds and a silver at the Commonwealth Games, and then two more golds and a bronze at the European Championships.

=== Lifetime Achievement Award ===
On 15 December 2022, it was announced that the Lifetime Achievement Award would be awarded to sprinter Usain Bolt for his glittering career.

Bolt was not present to receive the award, instead speaking in a pre-recorded video.

=== Unsung Hero Award ===
The Unsung Hero Award rewards volunteers for their contribution to grassroots sports in their local community. The eight nominees were announced on 9 December 2022.

Football volunteer Mike Alden from Bristol won the award for his work in deprived areas and encouragement for people of all ages and abilities to play the game. Denise Lewis and Jonnie Peacock presented the award.

=== Helen Rollason Award and Special Award ===
The Helen Rollason Award for outstanding achievement in the face of adversity was awarded to rugby league player Rob Burrow for raising awareness of and fundraising for motor neuron diseases, whilst battling the illness himself. His friend and teammate Kevin Sinfield also received a Special Award for a series of fundraising efforts, which had been in aid of funding further MND research. They were joined on stage by Rob's wife, Lindsey, his family, former teammates, and members of the MND community. Sinfield presented Burrow with the award, whilst Sinfield was presented with his award by Doddie Weir's son Hamish. Weir, a former winner of this award, also suffered from MND, and died just weeks before the show.

=== World Sport Star Award ===
On 19 December 2022, it was announced that footballer Lionel Messi had been awarded the World Sport Star of the Year Award. Messi had led Argentina to victory at the World Cup, where he won the Golden Boot. Messi was not present at the ceremony.

=== Team of the Year and Coach of the Year ===
The Team of the Year Award and Coach of the Year Award were presented together. The England women's football team won the Team of the Year Award, whilst the team's manager Sarina Wiegman won the Coach of the Year Award. This was in recognition for the team's victory on home soil at the European Championships, which was the first major trophy for an England team since 1966.

Dame Jessica Ennis-Hill announced the winners, whilst Max Whitlock presented the trophies to the team.

== In Memoriam ==
- Doddie Weir
- Billy Bingham
- Gordon Lee
- Terry Neill
- Colin Grainger
- Davie Wilson
- Maurice Norman
- Des Drummond
- Johnny Whiteley
- Maurice Lindsay
- Phil Jackson
- Kevin Beardmore
- David Stephenson
- Val Robinson
- Sheila Hill
- Jim Parks
- Ray Illingworth
- Andrew Symonds
- Rod Marsh
- Ronnie Radford
- John Madden
- Tom Weiskopf
- Nick Bollettieri
- Bernard Atha
- John Landy
- Robbie Brightwell
- Alan Ash
- Tom Kiernan
- Mike Davis
- Brian Robinson
- Rab Wardell
- John Paul
- David Johnson
- John Hughes
- Andy Goram
- Tom Smith
- Phil Bennett
- Ken Jones
- Gian Piero Ventrone
- Wim Jansen
- David Moores
- Frank O'Farrell
- Bobby Hope
- David Armstrong
- Tony Brooks
- Chrissy Rouse
- Keith Farmer
- Anneli Drummond-Hay
- Va'aiga Tuigamala
- Eddie Butler
- Betty Codona
- AJ Rosen
- Tony Nash
- Brenda Fisher
- Brian Dickinson
- Paul Anderson
- Jane Wykeham-Musgrave
- Lester Piggott
- Jimmy Lindley
- Harry Gration
- John Hanmer
- Brent Pope
- Paul McNaughton
- Damian Casey
- Peter Butler
- Shane Warne
