= BBC Women's Footballer of the Year =

Annual award

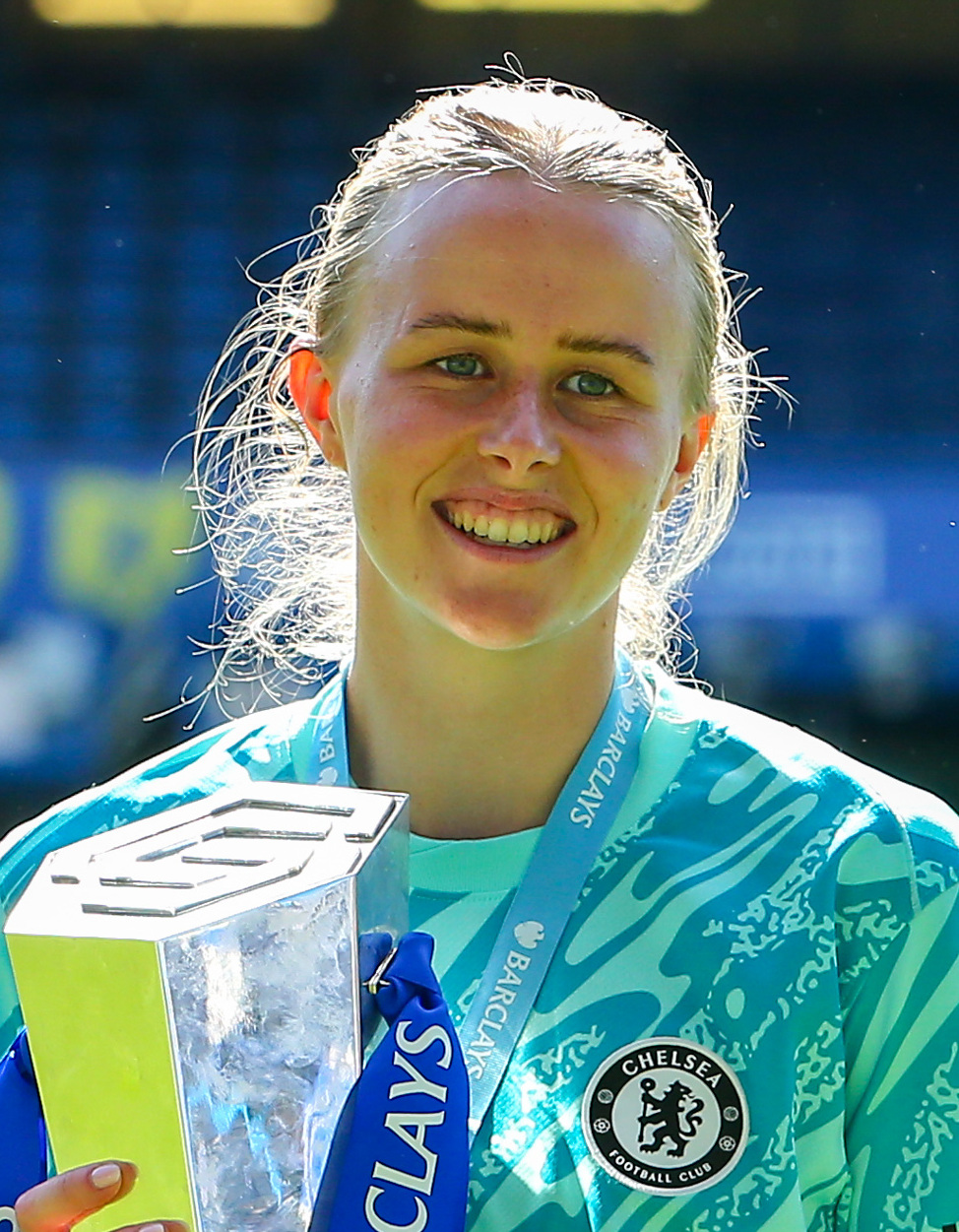
- 2025 winner Hannah Hampton
- Sport: Women's association football
- Presented by: BBC World Service

History
- First award: 2015
- Editions: 11 (as of 2025)
- First winner: Asisat Oshoala
- Most wins: Lucy Bronze; Ada Hegerberg (2 wins)
- Most recent: Hannah Hampton (2025)

The BBC Women's Footballer of the Year is an annual award given to the best women's footballer of the year. Finalists are shortlisted by an expert panel made up of current and former professional players, coaches, administrators, journalists, and experts. The winner is decided by fan voting from all around the world.

== Winners ==
Year	Winner	Shortlist	Ref.
2015	Asisat Oshoala; Nigeria and (England) Liverpool	Verónica Boquete, Spain and (Germany) 1. FFC Frankfurt; Nadine Keßler, Germany and VfL Wolfsburg; Kim Little, Scotland and (United States) Seattle Reign FC; Marta, Brazil and (Sweden) FC Rosengård	
2016	Kim Little; Scotland and (United States) Seattle Reign FC	Gaëlle Enganamouit, Cameroon and (Sweden) FC Rosengård; Amandine Henry, France and Lyon; Carli Lloyd, United States and Houston Dash; Becky Sauerbrunn, United States and FC Kansas City	
2017	Ada Hegerberg; Norway and (France) Lyon	Melanie Behringer, Germany and FC Bayern Munich; Hedvig Lindahl, Sweden and (England) Chelsea; Marta, Brazil and (United States) Orlando Pride; Christine Sinclair, Canada and (United States) Portland Thorns FC	
2018	Lucy Bronze; England and (France) Lyon	Pernille Harder, Denmark and (Germany) VfL Wolfsburg; Sam Kerr, Australia, (United States) Chicago Red Stars and Perth Glory; Dzsenifer Marozsán, Germany and (France) Lyon; Lieke Martens, Netherlands and (Spain) FC Barcelona	
2019	Ada Hegerberg (France) Lyon	Pernille Harder, Denmark and (Germany) VfL Wolfsburg; Lindsey Horan, United States and Portland Thorns FC; Sam Kerr, Australia, (United States) Chicago Red Stars and Perth Glory; Saki Kumagai, Japan and (France) Lyon	
2020	Lucy Bronze; England and (France) Lyon	Julie Ertz, United States and Chicago Red Stars; Sam Kerr, Australia and (England) Chelsea; Vivianne Miedema, Netherlands and (England) Arsenal; Megan Rapinoe, United States and Reign FC	
2021	Vivianne Miedema; Netherlands and (England) Arsenal	Caroline Graham Hansen, Norway and (Spain) Barcelona; Sam Kerr, Australia and (England) Chelsea; Ashley Lawrence, Canada and (France) Paris Saint-Germain; Alexia Putellas, Spain and Barcelona	
2022	Beth Mead; England and Arsenal	Sam Kerr, Australia and (England) Chelsea; Alexandra Popp, Germany and VfL Wolfsburg; Alexia Putellas, Spain and Barcelona; Wendie Renard, France and Lyon	
2023	Mary Earps; England and Manchester United	Aitana Bonmatí, Spain and Barcelona; Sam Kerr, Australia and (England) Chelsea; Alexandra Popp, Germany and VfL Wolfsburg; Fridolina Rolfö, Sweden and (Spain) Barcelona	
2024	Barbra Banda; Zambia and (United States) Orlando Pride	Aitana Bonmatí, Spain and Barcelona; Naomi Girma, United States and San Diego Wave; Caroline Graham Hansen, Norway and (Spain) Barcelona; Sophia Smith, United States and Portland Thorns	
2025	Hannah Hampton; England and Chelsea F.C. Women	Aitana Bonmatí, Spain and Barcelona; Mariona Caldentey, Spain and Arsenal; Alessia Russo, England and Arsenal; Patri Guijarro, Spain and Barcelona	

== Records ==
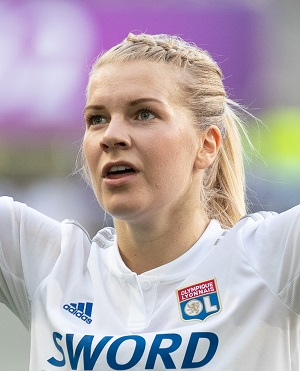
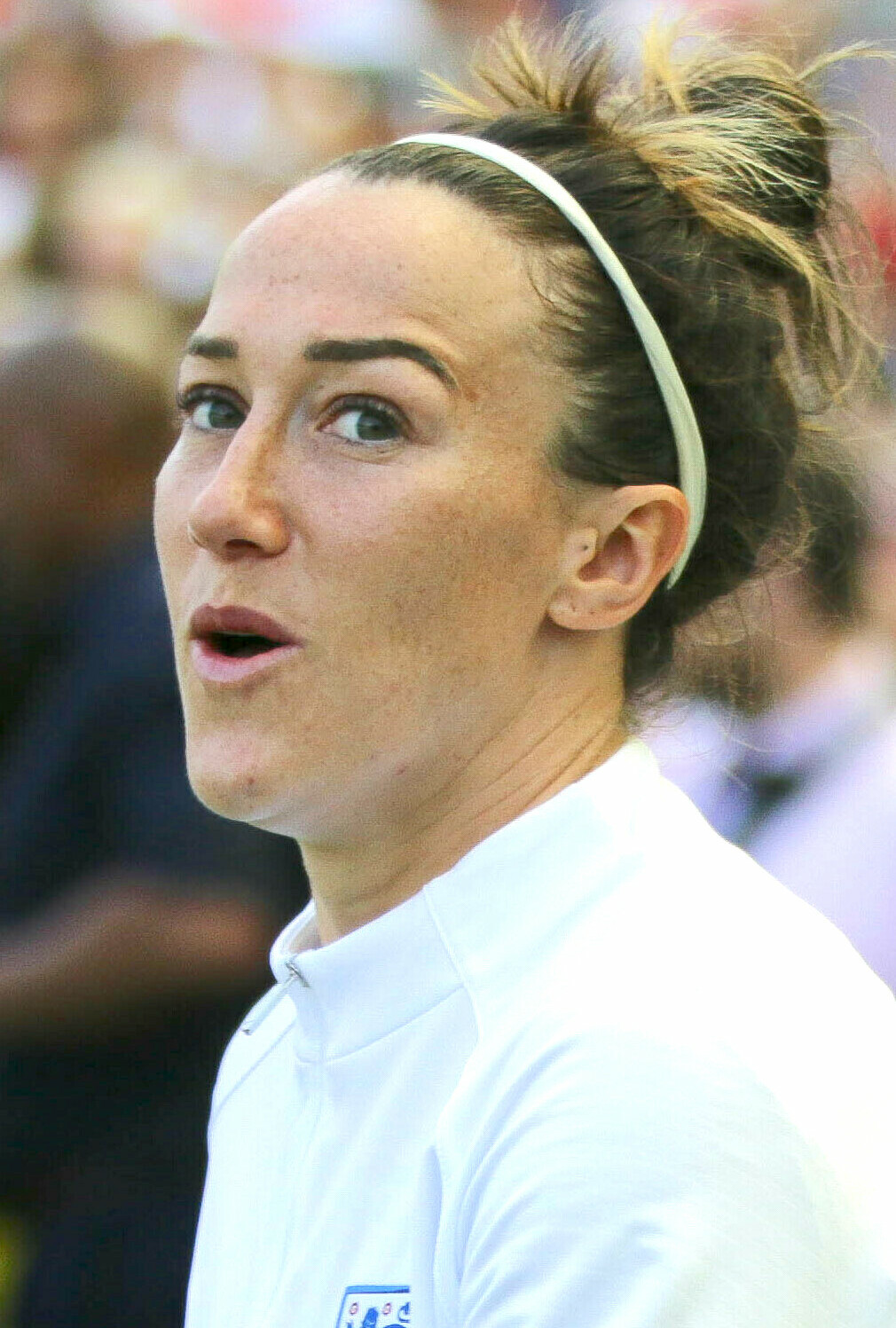
Ada Hegerberg and Lucy Bronze with two wins have jointly won the most BBC Women's Footballer of the Year awards.

Only those with multiple wins will be listed.

=== Wins by player ===
Rank	Player	Wins
1	(England) Lucy Bronze	2 (2018, 2020)
1	(Norway) Ada Hegerberg	2 (2017, 2019)

=== Wins by club ===
Rank	Club	Wins
1	(France) Lyon	4 (2017, 2018, 2019, 2020)
2	(England) Arsenal	2 (2021, 2022)

=== Wins by nationality ===
Rank	Nation	Wins
1	England	4 (2018, 2020, 2022, 2023)
2	Norway	2 (2017, 2019)

== See also ==
- List of sports awards honoring women
