= Ovarian Cancer Action =

Ovarian Cancer Action is a charity based in the United Kingdom that funds scientific research both nationally and internationally. Nationally, the organisation funds the Ovarian Cancer Action Research Centre, based in the Institute of Reproductive and Developmental Biology (IRDB) on the Hammersmith Campus, and is one of the largest clusters of ovarian cancer research in Europe. International funding is made available through competitive research funding calls.

The charity also promotes public awareness of ovarian cancer. On 8 May 2019 the charity carried out a symptoms awareness campaign for World Ovarian Cancer Day, which saw volunteers distributing 33,000 white roses with symptoms tags attached in locations throughout the United Kingdom. Cross-party MPs, including Theresa May and Jeremy Corbyn, also wore a white rose to PMQs to show their support for the campaign.

The charity's headquarters are located in London. The Ovarian Cancer Action Research Centre is located at Hammersmith Hospital, London. The organisation is funded through donations and fundraising events.

== History ==
John Harris established the Helene Harris Memorial Trust (HHMT) in 1985 in memory of his wife who died from ovarian cancer. In 2005 John and Helene’s daughter, Allyson Kaye, developed the HHMT Trust into a charity called Ovarian Cancer Action.

A year later in 2006, Ovarian Cancer Action funded the creation of the Ovarian Cancer Action Research Centre at Hammersmith Hospital.

In 2015 and 2016 the charity funded research and carried out a survey about women's health.

== HHMT Conference ==
Every four years Ovarian Cancer Action hosts and funds the HMMT International Forum which brings together international ovarian cancer scientists and clinicians to present recent advances and discuss future directions in ovarian cancer.

In 2011 the 12th HMMT International Forum produced the paper, Rethinking Ovarian Cancer: Recommendations for Improving Outcomes, in the journal Nature Reviews Cancer.
