= ATA Football =

American sports streaming platform

ata football
- Screenshot Screenshot of the DAZN app
- Available in: English, French
- Founded: 2019 in United States
- Area served: United States, UK, Italy, Germany, Ireland, Canada
- Owner: DAZN Group
- Key people: Esmeralda Negron (co-founder), Hannah Brown (co-founder)
- Industry: Internet television, Sports broadcasting
- Website: www.atafootball.com

ata football is an American over-the-top sports streaming service. The service carries live and on-demand streaming of women's football (soccer) events from various properties. Ata Football was first launched in September 2020.

== Overview ==
The service was originally established in late 2019 by Atalanta Media, a sports media company founded by Esmeralda Negron and Hannah Brown. Negron is a former professional footballer and sports executive and Brown is a former Sky Sports rights executive.

On August 15, 2023, ata football announced that it had been acquired by the over-the-top sports streaming service, DAZN.

== Sports rights ==
Noted sports rights held by ata football include:

- FA Women's Super League (FA WSL) - broadcast on NBC Sports in the US and DAZN in Italy and Germany as well as the atafootball.com website
- Division 1 Feminine (D1F) - broadcast on atafootball.com website in the United States, UK, Italy and Germany; DAZN in Italy and Germany; ESPN+ and Fanatiz in the United States

== See also ==
- NBC Sports
- ESPN+
