= 2021–22 FA WSL =

Eleventh season of the top English women's association football league

FA WSL
- Season: 2021–22
- Dates: 3 September 2021 – 8 May 2022
- Champions: Chelsea; 5th title
- Relegated: Birmingham City
- Champions League: Chelsea; Arsenal; Manchester City
- Matches: 132
- Goals: 384 (2.91 per match)
- Top goalscorer: Sam Kerr (20 goals)
- Biggest home win: Arsenal 7–0 Aston Villa; 1 May 2022
- Biggest away win: Leicester City 0–9 Chelsea; 27 March 2022
- Highest scoring: Leicester City 0–9 Chelsea; 27 March 2022; Manchester City 7–2 Brighton & Hove Albion; 30 April 2022
- Longest winning run: 9 matches Chelsea; Manchester City
- Longest unbeaten run: 13 matches Chelsea
- Longest winless run: 10 matches Birmingham City; Reading
- Longest losing run: 9 matches Leicester City
- Highest attendance: 20,241; Manchester United 3–1 Everton (27 March 2022)
- Lowest attendance: 298; Birmingham City 0–3 Reading (7 November 2021)

The 2021–22 FA WSL season (also known as the Barclays FA Women's Super League for sponsorship reasons) was the eleventh season of the FA Women's Super League (WSL) since it was formed in 2010. It was the fourth season after the rebranding of the four highest levels in English women's football.

On 4 May 2022, Birmingham City were relegated following a 6–0 defeat away at Manchester City with one game remaining. Members of the WSL since it was founded in 2011, it ended Birmingham's twenty-year stint as a top-flight club having last been promoted as the 2001–02 FA Women's Premier League Northern Division champions.

Chelsea successfully defended the title by beating Manchester United 4–2 in the final matchday, winning their third consecutive and fifth overall WSL title.

== Teams ==
Twelve teams contested the 2021–22 FA WSL season. At the end of the previous season, Bristol City were relegated after four seasons in the WSL while Leicester City were promoted for the first time.

Locations of the 2021–22 FA WSL teams

Team	Location	Ground	Capacity	2020–21 season
Arsenal	Borehamwood	Meadow Park	4,502	3rd
Aston Villa	Walsall	Bescot Stadium	11,300	10th
Birmingham City	Birmingham	St Andrew's	29,902	11th
Brighton & Hove Albion	Crawley	Broadfield Stadium	5,800	6th
Chelsea	Kingston upon Thames	Kingsmeadow	4,850	1st
Everton	Liverpool	Walton Hall Park	2,200	5th
Leicester City	Leicester	King Power Stadium	32,212	WC, 1st
Manchester City	Manchester	Academy Stadium	7,000	2nd
Manchester United	Leigh	Leigh Sports Village	12,000	4th
Reading	Reading	Madejski Stadium	24,161	7th
Tottenham Hotspur	Canons Park	The Hive Stadium	5,419	8th
West Ham United	Dagenham	Victoria Road	6,078	9th

=== Stadium changes ===
Two teams changed home ground prior to the start of the season: Birmingham City relocated from Damson Park to St Andrew's, home of the team's male affiliate since 1906. Leicester City prepared for their maiden WSL season by moving to their parent club's main stadium, King Power Stadium, with Burton Albion's Pirelli Stadium serving as backup when fixtures clash with Leicester's men's side.

=== Personnel and kits ===
Team	Manager	Captain	Kit manufacturer	Shirt sponsor
Arsenal	(Sweden) Jonas Eidevall	(Scotland) Kim Little	Adidas	Fly Emirates
Aston Villa	(England) Carla Ward	(Germany) Marisa Ewers	Kappa	Cazoo
Birmingham City	(England) Darren Carter (interim)	(Republic of Ireland) Louise Quinn	Nike	SmartMeds
Brighton & Hove Albion	(England) Hope Powell	(England) Danielle Bowman	Nike	American Express
Chelsea	(England) Emma Hayes	(Sweden) Magdalena Eriksson	Nike	Three
Everton	(England) Chris Roberts (interim)	(Scotland) Lucy Graham	Hummel	MegaFon (Note: On 2 March 2022, Everton suspended the sponsorship deal with MegaFon and removed the logos from their shirts in response to the 2022 Russian invasion of Ukraine due to Alisher Usmanov's close ties to Vladimir Putin.)
Leicester City	(England) Lydia Bedford	(England) Sophie Barker	Adidas	FBS
Manchester City	(Wales) Gareth Taylor	(England) Steph Houghton	Puma	Etihad Airways
Manchester United	(England) Marc Skinner	(England) Katie Zelem	Adidas	TeamViewer
Reading	(England) Kelly Chambers	(Wales) Natasha Harding	Macron	YLD
Tottenham Hotspur	(England) Rehanne Skinner	(Canada) Shelina Zadorsky	Nike	AIA
West Ham United	(New Zealand) Olli Harder	(England) Gilly Flaherty	Umbro	Betway

=== Managerial changes ===
Team	Outgoing manager	Manner of departure	Date of vacancy	Position in table	Incoming manager	Date of appointment
Aston Villa	(England) Marcus Bignot (interim)	End of interim period	10 May 2021	End of season (10th)	(England) Carla Ward	20 May 2021
Birmingham City	(England) Carla Ward	Resigned	16 May 2021	End of season (11th)	(Scotland) Scott Booth	30 June 2021
Arsenal	(Australia) Joe Montemurro	Resigned	16 May 2021	End of season (3rd)	(Sweden) Jonas Eidevall	28 June 2021
Manchester United	(England) Casey Stoney	Resigned	16 May 2021	End of season (4th)	(England) Marc Skinner	29 July 2021
Everton	(Scotland) Willie Kirk	Sacked	16 October 2021	8th	(France) Jean-Luc Vasseur	29 October 2021
Birmingham City	(Scotland) Scott Booth	Sacked	18 November 2021	11th	(England) Tony Elliott (interim)	18 November 2021
Birmingham City	(England) Tony Elliott (interim)	End of interim period	21 November 2021	11th	(England) Darren Carter (Note: Carter was initially appointed as interim manager, but the move was made permanent on 30 May 2022.)	21 November 2021
Leicester City	(England) Jonathan Morgan	Sacked	25 November 2021	12th	(England) Emile Heskey (interim)	25 November 2021
Leicester City	(England) Emile Heskey (interim)	End of interim period	6 December 2021	12th	(England) Lydia Bedford	6 December 2021
Everton	(France) Jean-Luc Vasseur	Sacked	2 February 2022	10th	(England) Chris Roberts (interim)	2 February 2022

== League table ==
Pos	Team	Pld	W	D	L	GF	GA	GD	Pts	Qualification or relegation
1	Chelsea (C)	22	18	2	2	62	11	+51	56	Qualification for the Champions League group stage
2	Arsenal	22	17	4	1	65	10	+55	55	Qualification for the Champions League second round
3	Manchester City	22	15	2	5	60	22	+38	47	Qualification for the Champions League first round
4	Manchester United	22	12	6	4	45	22	+23	42	
5	Tottenham Hotspur	22	9	5	8	24	23	+1	32	
6	West Ham United	22	7	6	9	23	33	−10	27	
7	Brighton & Hove Albion	22	8	2	12	24	38	−14	26	
8	Reading	22	7	4	11	21	40	−19	25	
9	Aston Villa	22	6	3	13	13	40	−27	21	
10	Everton	22	5	5	12	18	41	−23	20	
11	Leicester City	22	4	1	17	14	53	−39	13	
12	Birmingham City (R)	22	3	2	17	15	51	−36	11	Relegation to the Championship

Source: FA WSL
Rules for classification: 1) Points; 2) Goal difference; 3) Number of goals scored.
(C) Champions; (R) Relegated

== Results ==
Home \ Away	ARS	ASV	BIR	BHA	CHE	EVE	LEI	MCI	MNU	REA	TOT	WHU
Arsenal	—	7–0	4–2	2–1	3–2	3–0	4–0	5–0	1–1	4–0	3–0	4–0
Aston Villa	0–4	—	0–1	0–1	0–1	0–1	2–1	0–3	0–0	1–1	1–2	1–2
Birmingham City	2–0	0–1	—	0–5	0–1	0–0	1–2	2–3	0–2	0–3	0–2	0–1
Brighton & Hove Albion	0–3	0–1	1–3	—	0–0	1–1	1–0	0–6	0–2	4–1	2–1	2–0
Chelsea	0–0	1–0	5–0	3–1	—	4–0	2–0	1–0	4–2	5–0	2–1	2–0
Everton	0–3	0–2	3–1	0–1	0–3	—	3–2	0–4	1–1	1–2	2–2	1–1
Leicester City	0–5	1–2	2–0	1–0	0–9	0–1	—	1–4	1–3	0–0	0–2	3–0
Manchester City	1–1	5–0	6–0	7–2	0–4	4–0	4–0	—	1–0	2–0	1–2	0–2
Manchester United	0–2	5–0	5–0	1–0	1–6	3–1	4–0	2–2	—	2–0	3–0	3–0
Reading	0–4	3–0	3–2	2–0	1–0	0–3	1–0	0–4	1–3	—	0–0	1–2
Tottenham Hotspur	1–1	0–1	1–0	4–0	1–3	1–0	1–0	0–1	1–1	1–0	—	1–1
West Ham United	0–2	1–1	1–1	0–2	1–4	3–0	4–0	0–2	1–1	2–2	1–0	—

Source: The FA
Legend: Blue = home team win; Yellow = draw; Red = away team win.

=== Positions by round ===
The table lists the positions of teams after each week of matches. In order to preserve chronological progress, any postponed matches are not included in the round at which they were originally scheduled, but added to the full round they were played immediately afterwards. For example, if a match is scheduled for round 13, but then postponed and played between rounds 16 and 17, it will be added to the standings for round 16.

Team ╲ Round	1	2	3	4	5	6	7	8	9	10	11	12	13	14	15	16	17	18	19	20	21	22
Chelsea	7	6	4	3	2	2	2	2	2	2	2	2	2	2	2	2	2	1	1	1	1	1
Arsenal	4	2	1	1	1	1	1	1	1	1	1	1	1	1	1	1	1	2	2	2	2	2
Manchester City	1	7	8	9	9	7	9	7	6	6	5	5	5	6	5	5	4	4	4	4	3	3
Manchester United	3	3	6	4	4	5	5	6	5	4	4	3	3	3	4	3	3	3	3	3	4	4
Tottenham Hotspur	6	4	2	2	3	3	4	4	3	3	3	4	4	4	3	4	5	5	5	5	5	5
West Ham United	10	8	7	5	6	6	7	5	7	7	8	8	7	7	7	8	6	7	7	6	6	6
Brighton & Hove Albion	2	1	5	7	5	4	3	3	4	5	7	7	8	8	8	7	8	6	6	7	7	7
Reading	11	11	11	12	10	9	8	8	8	8	6	6	6	5	6	6	7	8	8	8	8	8
Aston Villa	5	5	3	6	7	8	6	10	10	10	10	10	9	9	9	9	10	10	9	9	9	9
Everton	12	12	9	8	8	10	10	9	9	9	9	9	10	10	10	10	9	9	10	10	10	10
Leicester City	8	9	10	10	12	12	12	12	12	11	12	11	11	11	11	11	11	11	11	11	11	11
Birmingham City	9	10	12	11	11	11	11	11	11	12	11	12	12	12	12	12	12	12	12	12	12	12

Leader and Champions League group stage
Champions League second round
Champions League first round
Relegation to Championship

Source: FA WSL

=== Results by round ===
Team ╲ Round	1	2	3	4	5	6	7	8	9	10	11	12	13	14	15	16	17	18	19	20	21	22
Arsenal	W	W	W	W	W	W	D	W	W	L	D	W	D	D	W	W	W	W	W	W	W	W
Aston Villa	W	D	W	L	L	L	W	L	L	L	L	W	L	W	L	L	L	D	W	D	L	L
Birmingham City	L	L	L	L	D	L	L	L	L	L	W	L	L	L	L	L	L	D	W	L	L	W
Brighton & Hove Albion	W	W	L	L	W	W	W	L	L	L	L	D	L	L	W	W	L	W	L	L	L	D
Chelsea	L	W	W	W	W	W	W	W	L	D	W	W	D	W	W	W	W	W	W	W	W	W
Everton	L	L	W	W	L	L	D	W	D	L	L	L	L	W	W	L	L	L	D	L	D	D
Leicester City	L	L	L	L	L	L	L	L	L	W	L	W	L	W	W	L	L	L	L	L	D	L
Manchester City	W	L	L	L	D	W	L	W	W	W	W	D	L	W	W	W	W	W	W	W	W	W
Manchester United	W	W	L	W	D	D	D	L	W	W	W	W	D	L	W	W	D	W	W	D	W	L
Reading	L	L	L	L	W	W	D	W	W	W	W	W	L	L	D	L	L	D	L	L	D	L
Tottenham Hotspur	W	W	W	W	L	D	D	L	W	W	D	L	W	W	D	L	L	L	L	D	L	W
West Ham United	L	D	W	W	D	L	D	W	D	D	W	L	W	L	L	W	D	W	L	W	L	L

Source: The FA
W = Win; D = Draw; L = Lose

== Season statistics ==
=== Top scorers ===
Rank	Player	Club	Goals
1	(Australia) Sam Kerr	Chelsea	20
2	(Netherlands) Vivianne Miedema	Arsenal	14
3	(England) Beth Mead	Arsenal	11
4	(England) Lauren Hemp	Manchester City	10
5	(England) Alessia Russo	Manchester United	9
5	(Jamaica) Khadija Shaw	Manchester City	9
7	Bethany England	Chelsea	8
7	(England) Leah Galton	Manchester United	8
7	(England) Georgia Stanway	Manchester City	8
10	(England) Ella Toone	Manchester United	7
10	(Norway) Guro Reiten	Chelsea	7

=== Clean sheets ===
Rank	Player	Club	Clean sheets
1	(Austria) Manuela Zinsberger	Arsenal	13
2	(England) Mary Earps	Manchester United	10
3	(Germany) Ann-Katrin Berger	Chelsea	9
4	(England) Ellie Roebuck	Manchester City	8
5	(Republic of Ireland) Grace Moloney	Reading	7
5	(Sweden) Zećira Mušović	Chelsea	7
7	(Republic of Ireland) Megan Walsh	Brighton & Hove Albion	6
8	(Jamaica) Rebecca Spencer	Tottenham Hotspur	5
9	(England) Hannah Hampton	Aston Villa	4
9	(England) Demi Lambourne	Leicester City	4
9	(Scotland) Sandy MacIver	Everton	4

=== Hat-tricks ===
Player	For	Against	Result	Date	Ref.
(Australia) Sam Kerr	Chelsea	Birmingham City	5–0 (H)	21 November 2021	
(Jamaica) Khadija Shaw (4)	Manchester City	Brighton & Hove Albion	7–2 (H)	30 April 2022	

=== Discipline ===
	Most yellow cards	Total	Most red cards	Total	Ref.
Player	(France) Maéva Clemaron (Tottenham Hotspur) (Republic of Ireland) Katie McCabe (Arsenal)	7	(France) Hawa Cissoko (West Ham United)	2	
Club	Tottenham Hotspur	39	West Ham United	2	

== Awards ==
=== Monthly awards ===
Month	Manager of the Month		Player of the Month		Goal of the Month		Ref.
Month	Manager	Club	Player	Club	Player	Club	Ref.
September	(Sweden) Jonas Eidevall	Arsenal	(England) Beth Mead	Arsenal	(Denmark) Pernille Harder (vs Manchester United)	Chelsea	
October	(Sweden) Jonas Eidevall	Arsenal	(Republic of Ireland) Katie McCabe	Arsenal	(Republic of Ireland) Katie McCabe (vs Aston Villa)	Arsenal	
November	(England) Kelly Chambers	Reading	(Canada) Jessie Fleming	Chelsea	(England) Alessia Russo (vs Tottenham Hotspur)	Manchester United	
December	(England) Marc Skinner	Manchester United	(England) Ella Toone	Manchester United	(England) Georgia Stanway (vs Birmingham City)	Manchester City	
January	(England) Marc Skinner	Manchester United	(England) Leah Galton	Manchester United	(England) Natasha Dowie (vs Leicester City)	Reading	
February	(England) Lydia Bedford	Leicester City	(England) Ashleigh Neville	Tottenham Hotspur	(Scotland) Caroline Weir (vs Manchester United)	Manchester City	
March	(England) Emma Hayes	Chelsea	(England) Alessia Russo	Manchester United	(England) Katie Zelem (vs Leicester City)	Manchester United	
April	(England) Darren Carter	Birmingham City	(Australia) Sam Kerr	Chelsea	(Japan) Yui Hasegawa (vs Reading)	West Ham United	

=== Annual awards ===
Award	Winner	Club
Barclays FA WSL Player of the Season	(Australia) Sam Kerr	Chelsea
Barclays FA WSL Manager of the Season	(England) Emma Hayes	Chelsea
PFA Players' Player of the Year	(Australia) Sam Kerr	Chelsea
PFA Young Player of the Year	(England) Lauren Hemp	Manchester City
FWA Footballer of the Year	(Australia) Sam Kerr	Chelsea

PFA Team of the Year
Goalkeeper	(Germany) Ann-Katrin Berger (Chelsea)			
Defenders	(Spain) Ona Batlle (Manchester United)	(England) Millie Bright (Chelsea)	(England) Leah Williamson (Arsenal)	(England) Alex Greenwood (Manchester City)
Midfielders	(Norway) Guro Reiten (Chelsea)		(Scotland) Caroline Weir (Manchester City)	(Scotland) Kim Little (Arsenal)
Forwards	(Netherlands) Vivianne Miedema (Arsenal)		(Australia) Sam Kerr (Chelsea)	(England) Lauren Hemp (Manchester City)
