= 2018–19 Arsenal W.F.C. season =

English women's football club season

Arsenal Women
2018–19 season
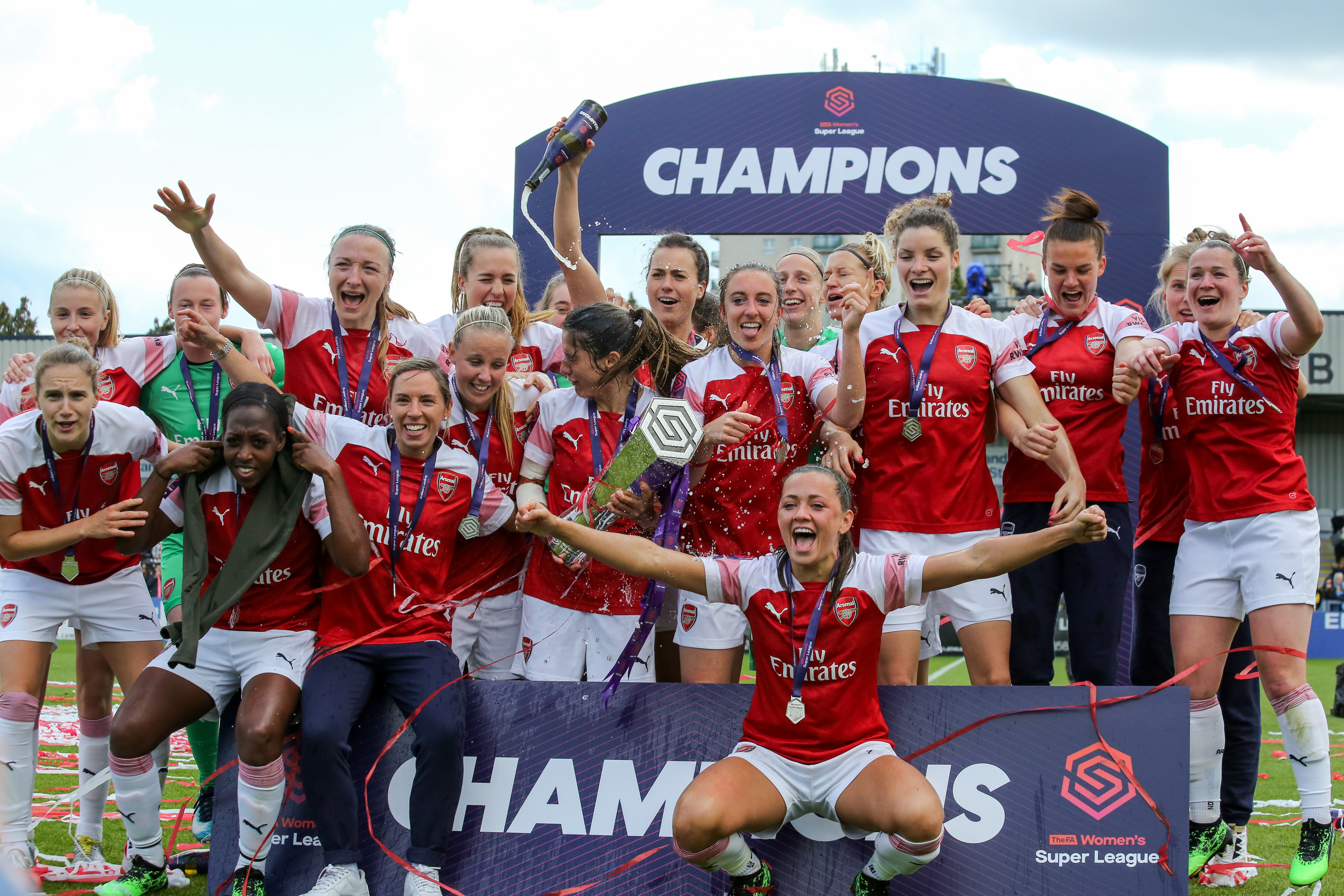
- Team celebrating with the FA WSL trophy
- Chairman: Sir Chips Keswick
- Manager: Joe Montemurro
- Stadium: Meadow Park
- WSL: Champions
- FA Cup: Fifth round
- League Cup: Runners-up
- Top goalscorer: League: Vivianne Miedema (22); All: Vivianne Miedema (31)
- Highest home attendance: 3,019 (vs Chelsea, 13 January 2019)
- Lowest home attendance: 450 (vs West Ham United, 19 August 2018)
- Average home league attendance: 1,586
- Biggest win: 9–0 (vs Lewes (A), WSL Cup, 16 September 2018)
- Biggest defeat: 0–3 (vs Chelsea (A), FA Cup, 17 February 2019)
Home colours	Away colours	Third colours
- All statistics correct as of 19 May 2019.

The 2018–19 season was Arsenal Women's Football Club's 32nd season of competitive football. The club participated in the WSL, the FA Cup and the League Cup. This was the first full season of the club under Australian coach Joe Montemurro.

The club qualified for the Champions League by securing a top two spot in the league with three games to go. In the penultimate game of the season, Arsenal secured the top spot of the league and was English champions once more after a seven-year wait. The Gunners finished runners-up in the League Cup and lost in the fifth round of the FA Cup.

== Review ==
=== Pre-season ===
Before the first friendlies in pre-season, the squad saw some changes. Midfielders Viktoria Schnaderbeck, Lia Wälti, defender Tabea Kemme (coming from the German Bundesliga) and goalkeeper Pauline Peyraud-Magnin (from the French Division 1) joined the squad, while Arsenal legend Alex Scott retired to focus on her media career, Heather O'Reilly moved back to the States and Anna Moorhouse and Lauren James switched to different English clubs.

The pre-season friendlies consisted of the 5–0 won homegame against Italian Serie A champions Juventus on 5 August, in which Vivianne Miedema scored four goals – Kim Little scored the other one. Arsenal participated in the Toulouse International Ladies Cup in France, where it competed against Montpellier HSC (won 2–1 with goals from Miedema and Daniëlle van de Donk) and Paris Saint-Germain (2–2 draw, with a goal from Beth Mead and a last-minute penalty by Little). The tournament was won by Arsenal, ahead of the aforementioned teams and Bayern Munich (who Arsenal didn't play).

=== August ===
After the friendlies, the only game in August was the League Cup tie against West Ham United. The game was won 3–1, with two goals from McCabe and one from Emma Mitchell. It also was the first appearance of Lia Wälti in a competitive match for Arsenal.

=== September ===
September saw the club play four games, three for the league and one for the League Cup. Arsenal got off to a great start in the league, by firing five past Liverpool in their 5–0 match on 9 September (home). Miedema scored her first hattrick of the season and a goal a piece for Lisa Evans and Little. Liverpool was unable to score in the goal behind Pauline Peyraud-Magnin who made her first appearance in the Arsenal shirt. The subsequent League Cup tie against Championship club Lewes on the 16th displayed the big class difference, Arsenal scored nine goals, with hattricks by Miedema and Little, with Van de Donk, McCabe and Evans each adding another goal to the scoreline, Lewes was unable to get a goal in leaving the score at 0–9. The thumping didn't stop there, Yeovil Town saw seven goals ending in the back of their net on 19 September (away), with Jordan Nobbs scoring a brace and Mead, McCabe, Miedema, Dominique Bloodworth and Little all scoring a goal. The team who held them to a season-defining 0–0 draw in the previous season was unable to respond to this firepower, ending the game in 0–7.

Greatest opposition came from West Ham United on the 23rd (home), who were able to go ahead on two occasions via goals by Kate Longhurst in a game that saw some sloppy defending and goalkeeping. A hattrick from Van de Donk and a goal from Little saw them come back, before Claire Rafferty scored from a free-kick leaving it up to Arsenal to keep the one goal advantage in the last few minutes of the game. The Gunners succeeded in that, the game ended in a 4–3 win.

=== October ===
After the match against West Ham, Arsenal faced Chelsea on 14 October, the champions of the previous season, in an away match. After the first 20 minutes, Arsenal took the lead when Little scored from the penalty spot following a challenge by Adelina Engman on Mitchell inside the penalty area. Before half-time, Miedema scored the second goal. After the break, Nobbs scored from a cross, Miedema added another goal after a rebound from Mead’s attempt, and Nobbs scored the fifth goal. The match ended 0–5 in favor of Arsenal. In the second half, a tackle by Drew Spence brought down Little, who was unable to continue and was later diagnosed with a broken leg that kept her out of play for up to 10 weeks. Spence received a yellow card for the challenge.

On the subsequent Sundays, Arsenal won both matches against Reading (6–0 at home, 21 October) and Bristol City (0–4 away, 28th). The Reading game saw another hattrick from Miedema, her third of the season (second in the league) and goals from Nobbs, Mead and Van de Donk. Bristol City saw four goals end up in their net, with Miedema scoring twice and Nobbs and Van de Donk claiming the other two goals. Bristol made it hard on Arsenal and the scoreline did not fully reflect the game, with two late goals (88' and 90') taking the score up to four, which did not seem fully deserved. Sophie Baggaley (Bristol goalkeeper) played a good game and held a lot of good shots. The two goals took Miedema up to 11 goals in just 6 games, making her the topscorer and well surpassing her four goals from the entire 2017–2018 season.

=== November ===
Birmingham City visited the Gunners at home on 4 November for what was predicted as the next big test after the game against Chelsea. The game started evenly with both teams unable to score a goal in the first half. The second half saw Nobbs score the first goal of the evening, but Arsenal was caught sleeping in the aftermath: Birmingham instantly responded with their goal, just a minute later. Not much later, Evans got to ground in the penalty area after being held on to by a Birmingham defender. Van de Donk converted the subsequent spot-kick. In the dying moments of the match, Nobbs scored the third goal - ending the game in 3–1.

After the international break, Arsenal visited Everton, who are at the bottom of the league at this point. The first half frustrated the Gunners, as they had a lot of chances, but were unable to put them past the Everton goalkeeper. It was Van de Donk who was able to find the back of the net in the end of the first half. The second half saw a quick start, Nobbs scored the second before Miedema scored another two. A comfortable 0–4 win, but a big blow to the team when Nobbs went down with a few minutes to play and had to be stretchered off the pitch. Later it was confirmed that she had sustained an ACL injury, side-lining her for the rest of the season.

With both Little and Nobbs out of the squad, the team welcomed Brighton & Hove Albion on 25 November. The Gunners saw themselves go behind in the ninth minute when a defensive mix-up let through Iniabasi Umotong, slotting in her shot past Van Veenendaal. It took some time for the team to get up to steam, as they were saved a second goal against not much later. They then picked up the pace and saw the three Dutch players, Miedema, Bloodworth and Van de Donk all fire a goal past the Brighton goalkeeper in the first half. The second half saw a lone goal from Mead to finish the game on 4–1, extending their winning streak to 9 league games.

=== December ===
2 December saw the team travelling to Manchester to play second-placed Manchester City. The injuries clearly had hit hard on the team, with just nine fit senior outfield players, giving Paige Bailey-Gayle her first start for the team. It proved a frustrating afternoon for the Gunners, who saw Georgia Stanway fire two goals past Peyraud-Magnin, leaving Arsenal no chances. The 2–0 loss ended their winning run of 9 league games, but left them still on top of the league with three points clear.

After the league defeat against City, Arsenal played the two remaining games in the groupstage of the League Cup. The first one on 6 December saw them when 5–0 at home against Charlton Athletic, with both Miedema and McCabe scoring a brace, complemented by a Charlton own goal. A week later on the 12th, the Gunners traveled to Kent to play against the Millwall Lionesses. Millwall went ahead in the first half, in a match that saw three academy players in the starting eleven. In the second half, three Arsenal goals came in quick succession: first Miedema scored and a minute later Ruby Grant scored her first goal for the senior team. Williamson scored her first goal of the season some minutes later to get a comfortable 1–3 win.

The League Cup results secured the top spot in the group and advancement to the play-offs stage. Because of the 11-team league, Arsenal did not play in the league whilst the other teams did. City went level on points but Arsenal had a game in hand and a better goal difference.

=== Winter Transfer Window ===
During the winter transfer window, the club made signings to strengthen the squad: Danish defender Janni Arnth (from Linköpings FC) and midfielder Katrine Veje (from Montpellier HSC).

=== January ===
The first game of 2019 was on 6 January away at West Ham United. It saw a slow start from Arsenal, who went behind after a goal from Jane Ross. Williamson and Arnth both scored a header from a corner by Mead, making it the first league goal for Williamson this season and Arnth scoring on her debut in an Arsenal shirt. Ross leveled just before half time, but two goals from Van de Donk made sure the Gunners won the match 2–4. The match also saw the return of captain Little, after having suffered a broken leg in the match against Chelsea. Later that afternoon, title rivals Manchester City drew against Bristol City, giving Arsenal a two-point lead and a game in hand at the top of the league table.

In the midweek on the 10th, Arsenal welcomed Birmingham City for the quarter-final of the League Cup. There were obvious signs of fatigue following the match against West Ham in the weekend. The first half saw no goals, but a good penalty stop from Van Veenendaal to deny Birmingham the lead. In the second half, a defensive mix-up led to the 0–1 lead for the visitors. The game however saw a nail-biting ending, when Van de Donk scored from a Miedema cross with six minutes left on the clock. In stoppage time, Miedema turned from provider to scorer when she sent home the pass from McCabe to make sure the game was won 2–1 in the 90 minutes and sending the Gunners into the semi-final. The game saw the first appearance of winter signing Katrine Veje.

The last game before the January international break, on the 13th saw London rivals Chelsea come to Borehamwood. It would prove to be a hard match for the Gunners, with Erin Cuthbert scoring on both sides of half time to go 0–2 ahead. Miedema scored in the 80th minute to make 1–2. It would prove to make an exciting last ten minutes of the match, but in the end not enough to get a point out of the match. This meant that Manchester City would go top of the league and leave Arsenal in second place, one point behind City but with a game in hand.

After the international break, Arsenal visited Reading on the 27th in Adams Park with good memories from last season's Continental Cup final win there. The team came out of the gates blazing with Miedema scoring her 16th league goal of the season, surpassing the record set for most league goals in a season by Ellen White in the previous season. A controversially given penalty used by Little and a last minute goal by McCabe, assisted with the first touches of just subbed on academy player Melisa Filis ended the game in a 0–3 win. A win of fourth placed Birmingham City over third placed Chelsea might mean that the title could be decided between Arsenal and Manchester City, who are now 5 and 6 points clear of Birmingham City and Chelsea. The Gunners still have their game in hand over Manchester City, whilst just being one point down on them.

=== February ===
On the 3rd, Arsenal visited Crawley Wasps, a fourth tier team for the fourth round proper of the FA Cup. The game was played with an heavily rotated team, with six academy players in the game. It was Little who scored first, after which the academy player and just 16-year-old Grant scored a hat-trick to make the final score 0–4.

Continuing in the cups, the newly formed Manchester United visited the Gunners in Borehamwood in the semi-final of the WSL Cup on the 7th. The Championship side provided a good battle but it was Arsenal who struck first: Miedema scored on both sides of half-time to net her 24th and 25th goals of the season. United scored through Mollie Green in the 83rd minute leaving a nervy last 10 minutes. Although the game finished 2–1, the score suggests a more even tie than it was, Arsenal were clearly on top against the Championship side.

The injuries were not to be forgotten however and the Gunners were painfully reminded when they were outplayed by Chelsea away on the 17th. The two top three sides met for the fifth round of the FA Cup, in which Arsenal were unable to respond to the game played by Chelsea. Chelsea won the match 3–0 with a brace from Bethany England and a goal by Jonna Andersson, booting Arsenal out of the FA Cup.

The mid-week game (20 February) against Yeovil Town was supposed to be a routine win against bottom of the table, but the Gunners only found the back of the net in the second half. Two goals from Little (one of which a penalty) and a strike by Mead saw Arsenal win 3–0 leaving them still in contention for the league title with a two-point deficit on City but with two games in hand.

23 February saw the League Cup final against Manchester City at Bramall Lane. This third game in a week saw Arsenal topscorer Miedema starting from the bench due to tiredness. The game was fairly even, both teams had chances but none went in the back of the net. After the regular 90 minutes and the extra time, it all came down to penalties. The game and previous games had taken a toll on the players, with both Williamson (who had a very good game) and Van de Donk both missing their penalties. City won 2–4 in the end.

=== March ===
After the February/March international period, Arsenal returned to league action when they were visited by Bristol City on 14 March. The game saw a quick opening goal by Miedema in the 11th minute making the Gunners' intention clear. The team had to wait until the second half however to see the ball end in the back of the net again: two goals by Miedema and one by McCabe. These goals went unanswered by the Vixens, resulting in a convincing 4–0 victory. The three goals by Miedema was her fourth (third in the league) hat-trick of the season.

24 March saw Arsenal travel to Liverpool for their rescheduled match. Having won the reverse fixture 5–0 at the start of the season and Liverpool's recent poor form made the Gunners heavy favourites for the game. Little opened the scoring after 20 minutes before Mead found the back of the net two minutes later. The second half saw a further strike from Mead and one by Bloodworth (however classified as an own goal by Sophie Bradley-Auckland). Courtney Sweetman-Kirk got one back via a penalty when Veje brought down a Liverpool player inside the box. The game ended after a goal by Miedema, her 20th league goal of the season, in 1–5.

The last game before the April international break saw Arsenal go to Birmingham City in a bid to wrap up Champions League football for the next season. A win would see them secure second place in the league, which means qualification. Arsenal started the first half well and had several opportunities to go ahead but was unable to find a way past Hannah Hampton who had a very good game keeping for the Blues. Birmingham had a few chances on goal as well, notably Ellen White requiring a diving save from Peyraud-Magnin. The second half started with much of the same: Arsenal had the upperhand but got sloppier and were unable to keep possession for very long. Of all the moments in the match, that was when McCabe shot the ball in the bottom-right corner of the Birmingham goal, just out of reach of Hampton. The match finished 0–1, securing Champions League football for the first time in five years.

=== April ===
After the April international break, the Gunners returned to London Colney to prepare for the match against Everton at home on 21 April. Everton held the second-to-last spot in the league rankings and it was expected that the team would be able to brush them aside with relative ease. It turned out to be more difficult than expected, though the match started well with a goal from a corner in the fourth minute (scored either by Quinn or an own goal). Miedema followed suit, with a goal halfway through the first half. The second half saw a tackle on Mead, which was only punished with a yellow card by the referee. Arsenal players argued with the referee about this, with Van de Donk even shoving her - earning a yellow card as well. Both the cards could have been straight reds as well. Some time after this incident, Van Veenendaal was unlucky or distracted and picked up a backpass from Williamson earning the Toffees an indirect free kick which went into the back of the net. It made for an anxious last half hour of the game, but the Gunners were able to see the game out: ending it with a 2–1 win.

The stage was set for a possible title-winning game when Arsenal went to Brighton & Hove Albion on 28 April. After other European clubs had record attendances in their matches, Brighton moved the match to the Falmer Stadium in an attempt to boost the match attendance. The match set a new WSL record with 5,265 spectators, some way away from attendances in Europe but still a significant increase and a possible step up towards the future. Arsenal quickly got out of the blocks with Miedema scoring a great goal from range in the sixth minute, setting the scene of the match that was to follow. The Brighton goalkeeper was able to tip Miedema's shot to the crossbar, but it went back down into the goal. Miedema turned to provider to give a great through-ball to McCabe who slotted home the second goal after half an hour. The second half would see two further strikes: after 70 minutes, a great strike from distance by Mead leaving the keeper with no chance of saving it. A further six minutes later, Van de Donk scored the fourth goal ending the score with 0–4. This meant Arsenal could not be passed in the league table anymore by second-placed Manchester City, making the Gunners the 2018-19 WSL champions after a seven-year wait since their last league title.

=== May ===
The only game left for the Gunners was on 11 May against runners-up Manchester City, who visited Arsenal at Meadow Park. The game didn't have any significance to the league standings, as both teams had already qualified for the Champions League and Arsenal could not be passed for first place anymore. City could've gone the whole season unbeaten domestically, had it not been for an 88th-minute strike by Mitchell fired in from outside the area past several City players and goalkeeper Ellie Roebuck. The defender had to deal with her share of injuries during the season and had only returned from injury this last game of the season.

== Squad information & statistics ==
Last updated on 14 May 2019

=== First team squad ===
No.	Name	Date of birth (age)	Since	Last contract	Signed from
Goalkeepers
1	(Netherlands) Sari van Veenendaal	3 April 1990 (aged 29)	2015	April 2016	(Netherlands) FC Twente
18	(France) Pauline Peyraud-Magnin	17 March 1992 (aged 27)	2018	July 2018	(France) Lyon
34	(England) Libby Harper	20 April 2001 (aged 18)	2018		(England) Arsenal Academy
Defenders
2	(Denmark) Katrine Veje	19 June 1991 (aged 28)	2019	January 2019	(France) Montpellier
3	(Scotland) Emma Mitchell	19 September 1992 (aged 26)	2013	April 2018	(Germany) SGS Essen
4	(Denmark) Janni Arnth	15 October 1986 (aged 32)	2018	November 2018	(Sweden) Linköping FC
6	(England) Leah Williamson	29 March 1997 (aged 22)	2014	March 2018	(England) Arsenal Academy
12	(Sweden) Jessica Samuelsson	30 January 1992 (aged 27)	2017	August 2017	(Sweden) Linköping FC
16	(Republic of Ireland) Louise Quinn	17 June 1990 (aged 29)	2017	June 2018	(England) Notts County
21	(Germany) Tabea Kemme	14 December 1991 (aged 27)	2018	July 2018	(Germany) Turbine Potsdam
22	(Austria) Viktoria Schnaderbeck	4 January 1991 (aged 28)	2018	May 2018	(Germany) Bayern Munich
Midfielders
7	(Netherlands) Daniëlle van de Donk	5 August 1991 (aged 27)	2015	October 2016	(Sweden) Kopparbergs/Göteborg FC
8	(England) Jordan Nobbs	8 December 1992 (aged 26)	2010	May 2018	(England) Sunderland
10	(Scotland) Kim Little (c)	29 June 1990 (aged 29)	2016	October 2016	(United States) Seattle Reign
19	(Switzerland) Lia Wälti	19 April 1993 (aged 26)	2018	July 2018	(Germany) Turbine Potsdam
20	(Netherlands) Dominique Bloodworth	17 January 1995 (aged 24)	2015	April 2016	(Germany) SGS Essen
24	(England) Ava Kuyken	15 June 2001 (aged 18)	2017		(England) Arsenal Academy
27	(England) Ruby Grant	15 April 2002 (aged 17)	2018		(England) Arsenal Academy
30	(England) Mel Filis	30 July 2002 (aged 16)	2018		(England) Arsenal Academy
31	(England) Hannah Dawbarn		2018		(England) Arsenal Academy
33	(Portugal) Ana Albuquerque	3 July 2002 (aged 16)	2018		(England) Arsenal Academy
Forwards
9	(England) Danielle Carter	18 May 1993 (aged 26)	2009	August 2017	(England) Sunderland
11	(Netherlands) Vivianne Miedema	15 July 1996 (aged 22)	2017	December 2018	(Germany) Bayern Munich
15	(Republic of Ireland) Katie McCabe	21 September 1995 (aged 23)	2015	June 2018	(Republic of Ireland) Shelbourne
17	(Scotland) Lisa Evans	21 May 1992 (aged 27)	2017	December 2018	(Germany) Bayern Munich
23	(England) Beth Mead	9 May 1995 (aged 24)	2017	January 2017	(England) Sunderland
28	(England) Paige Bailey-Gayle	12 November 2001 (aged 17)	2018		(England) Arsenal Academy
29	(England) Amelia Hazard	22 October 2000 (aged 18)	2018		(England) Arsenal Academy
32	(England) Lachante Paul	6 August 2002 (aged 16)	2018		(England) Arsenal Academy

=== Appearances and goals ===
No.	Name	WSL		FA Cup		League Cup		Total	
No.	Name	Apps	Goals	Apps	Goals	Apps	Goals	Apps	Goals
Goalkeepers
1	(Netherlands) Sari van Veenendaal	7	0	1	0	5	0	13	0
18	(France) Pauline Peyraud-Magnin	13	0	1	0	2	0	16	0
34	(England) Libby Harper	0	0	0	0	0	0	0	0
Defenders
2	(Denmark) Katrine Veje	8	0	2	0	3	0	13	0
3	(Scotland) Emma Mitchell	11	1	1	0	3	0	15	1
4	(Denmark) Janni Arnth	6	1	2	0	3	0	11	1
6	(England) Leah Williamson	19	1	2	0	6	1	27	2
12	(Sweden) Jessica Samuelsson	8	0	0	0	2	0	10	0
16	(Republic of Ireland) Louise Quinn	19	1	2	0	6	0	27	1
21	(Germany) Tabea Kemme	3	0	0	0	0	0	3	0
22	(Austria) Viktoria Schnaderbeck	5	0	0	0	0	0	5	0
Midfielders
7	(Netherlands) Daniëlle van de Donk	19	11	2	0	6	2	28	13
8	(England) Jordan Nobbs	8	9	0	0	2	0	10	9
10	(Scotland) Kim Little (c)	14	8	2	1	5	3	21	12
19	(Switzerland) Lia Wälti	12	0	0	0	5	0	17	0
20	(Netherlands) Dominique Bloodworth	19	3	1	0	5	0	25	3
24	(England) Ava Kuyken	7	0	2	0	3	0	12	0
27	(England) Ruby Grant	2	0	1	3	2	1	5	4
30	(England) Melisa Filis	1	0	1	0	2	0	4	0
31	(England) Hannah Dawbarn	0	0	1	0	2	0	3	0
33	(Portugal) Ana Albuquerque	0	0	1	0	1	0	2	0
Forwards
9	(England) Danielle Carter	6	0	0	0	0	0	6	0
11	(Netherlands) Vivianne Miedema	20	22	1	0	7	9	28	31
15	(Republic of Ireland) Katie McCabe	20	5	2	0	7	5	29	10
17	(Scotland) Lisa Evans	18	1	1	0	6	1	25	2
23	(England) Beth Mead	19	7	1	0	6	1	27	8
28	(England) Paige Bailey-Gayle	3	0	0	0	1	0	4	0
29	(England) Amelia Hazard	2	0	1	0	2	0	5	0
32	(England) Lachante Paul	0	0	0	0	1	0	1	0

=== Goalscorers ===
Rank	No.	Position	Name	WSL	FA Cup	League Cup	Total
1	11	FW	(Netherlands) Vivianne Miedema	22	0	9	31
2	7	MF	(Netherlands) Daniëlle van de Donk	11	0	2	13
3	10	MF	(Scotland) Kim Little	8	1	3	12
4	15	FW	(Republic of Ireland) Katie McCabe	5	0	5	10
5	8	MF	(England) Jordan Nobbs	9	0	0	9
6	23	FW	(England) Beth Mead	7	0	1	8
7	27	MF	(England) Ruby Grant	0	3	1	4
8	20	MF	(Netherlands) Dominique Bloodworth	3	0	0	3
9	17	FW	(Scotland) Lisa Evans	1	0	1	2
9	6	DF	(England) Leah Williamson	1	0	1	2
11	3	DF	(Scotland) Emma Mitchell	1	0	0	1
11	4	MF	(Denmark) Janni Arnth	1	0	0	1
11	16	MF	(Republic of Ireland) Louise Quinn	1	0	0	1
Total				70	4	23	98

=== Disciplinary record ===
Rank	No.	Position	Name	WSL		FA Cup		League Cup		Total	
Rank	No.	Position	Name	Booked	Sent off (straight red)	Booked	Sent off (straight red)	Booked	Sent off (straight red)	Booked	Sent off (straight red)
1	7	MF	(Netherlands) Daniëlle van de Donk	3	0	0	0	0	0	3	0
2	23	FW	(England) Beth Mead	2	0	0	0	0	0	2	0
2	15	FW	(Republic of Ireland) Katie McCabe	2	0	0	0	0	0	2	0
2	3	DF	(England) Emma Mitchell	2	0	0	0	0	0	2	0
2	11	FW	(Netherlands) Vivianne Miedema	2	0	0	0	0	0	2	0
6	19	MF	(Switzerland) Lia Wälti	1	0	0	0	0	0	1	0
6	6	DF	(England) Leah Williamson	1	0	0	0	0	0	1	0
6	2	FW	(Denmark) Katrine Veje	1	0	0	0	0	0	1	0
6	22	DF	(Austria) Viktoria Schnaderbeck	1	0	0	0	0	0	1	0
6	20	MF	(Netherlands) Dominique Bloodworth	0	0	0	0	1	0	1	0
Total				14	0	0	0	1	0	15	0

=== Clean sheets ===
Rank	No.	Name	WSL	FA Cup	League Cup	Total
1	18	(France) Pauline Peyraud-Magnin	7	0	1	8
2	1	(Netherlands) Sari van Veenendaal	5	1	1	7
Total			12	1	2	15

== Transfers, loans and other signings ==
=== Transfers in ===
Announcement date	No.	Position	Player	From club
24 May 2018	22	MF	(Austria) Viktoria Schnaderbeck	(Germany) Bayern Munich
2 July 2018	19	MF	(Switzerland) Lia Wälti	(Germany) Turbine Potsdam
4 July 2018	21	DF	(Germany) Tabea Kemme	(Germany) Turbine Potsdam
12 July 2018	18	GK	(France) Pauline Peyraud-Magnin	(France) Lyon
12 November 2018	4	DF	(Denmark) Janni Arnth	(Sweden) Linköping FC
2 January 2019	2	MF	(Denmark) Katrine Veje	(France) Montpellier HSC

=== Contract extensions ===
Announcement date	No.	Position	Player	At Arsenal since
16 May 2018	8	MF	(England) Jordan Nobbs	2010
25 May 2018	1	GK	(Netherlands) Sari van Veenendaal	2015
25 May 2018	7	MF	(Netherlands) Daniëlle van de Donk	2015
25 May 2018	20	MF	(Netherlands) Dominique Bloodworth	2015
14 June 2018	15	FW	(Republic of Ireland) Katie McCabe	2015
14 June 2018	16	DF	(Republic of Ireland) Louise Quinn	2017
17 October 2018	Coach		(Australia) Joe Montemurro	2017
18 December 2018	17	FW	(Scotland) Lisa Evans	2017
20 December 2018	11	FW	(Netherlands) Vivianne Miedema	2015
26 March 2019	15	FW	(Republic of Ireland) Katie McCabe	2015
29 March 2019	7	MF	(Netherlands) Daniëlle van de Donk	2015

=== Transfers out ===
Announcement date	No.	Position	Player	To club
2018	28	FW	(England) Jessica Ngunga	(England) Tottenham Hotspur
14 May 2018	22	DF	(England) Alex Scott	Retired
23 May 2018	17	MF	(United States) Heather O'Reilly	(United States) North Carolina Courage
1 July 2018		FW	(England) Brooke Nunn	(England) London Bees
4 July 2018	5	DF	(Germany) Josephine Henning	Retired
6 July 2018	13	GK	(England) Anna Moorhouse	(England) West Ham United
14 July 2018	22	FW	(England) Lauren James	(England) Manchester United
23 July 2018	31	GK	(England) Lucy Thomas	(England) Oxford United
27 March 2019	12	DF	(Sweden) Jessica Samuelsson	(Sweden) FC Rosengård

== Current injuries ==
Position	No.	Player	Injury	Last game	Estimated return
MF	8	(England) Jordan Nobbs	Knee (ACL)	vs. Everton, 18 November 2018	Next season
MF	19	(Switzerland) Lia Wälti	Knee (LCL)	vs. Chelsea, 13 January 2019	Next season
GK	18	(France) Pauline Peyraud-Magnin	Knee	vs. Birmingham City, 31 March 2019	Unknown

== Club ==
=== Kits ===
Supplier: Puma / Sponsor: Fly Emirates

Home	Home alt.1	Third	Goalkeeper 1	Goalkeeper 3

==== Kit usage ====
Kit	Combination	Usage	
Home	Red body; White sleeves; White shorts; White socks	WSL	Liverpool (H); Yeovil Town (A); West Ham United (H); Reading (H); Birmingham City (H); Brighton & Hove Albion (H); Manchester City (A); Chelsea (H), Reading (H); Yeovil Town (H); Bristol City (H); Birmingham City (A); Everton (H); Brighton & Hove Albion (A); Manchester City (H)
Home	Red body; White sleeves; White shorts; White socks	FA Cup	Crawley Wasps (A)
Home	Red body; White sleeves; White shorts; White socks	League Cup	West Ham United (H); Charlton Athletic (H); Millwall Lionesses (A); Birmingham City (H); Manchester United (H); Manchester City (N)
Home alt. 1	Red body; White sleeves; White shorts; Red socks	WSL	Chelsea (A)
Home alt. 1	Red body; White sleeves; White shorts; Red socks	FA Cup	Chelsea (A)
Third	Mint body; Mint sleeves; Mint shorts; Mint socks	WSL	Bristol City (A); Everton (A); West Ham United (A); Liverpool (A)
Third	Mint body; Mint sleeves; Mint shorts; Mint socks	League Cup	Lewes (A)

==== Goalkeeper kit usage ====
Kit	Combination	Usage	
Goalkeeper 1	Green body; Green sleeves; Green shorts; Green socks	WSL	Liverpool (H); West Ham United (H); Reading (H); Birmingham City (H); Manchester City (A); Chelsea (H); Reading (H); Bristol City (H); Everton (A); Brighton & Hove Albion (A); Manchester City (H)
Goalkeeper 1	Green body; Green sleeves; Green shorts; Green socks	League Cup	West Ham United (H); Charlton Athletic (H); Millwall Lionesses (A); Birmingham City (H); Manchester United (H); Manchester City (N)
Goalkeeper 3	Purple body; Purple sleeves; Purple shorts; Purple socks	WSL	Yeovil Town (A); Chelsea (A); Bristol City (A); Everton (A); Brighton & Hove Albion (H); West Ham United (A); Yeovil Town (H); Liverpool (A); Birmingham City (A)
Goalkeeper 3	Purple body; Purple sleeves; Purple shorts; Purple socks	FA Cup	Crawley Wasps (A); Chelsea (A)
Goalkeeper 3	Purple body; Purple sleeves; Purple shorts; Purple socks	League Cup	Lewes (A)

== Non-competitive ==
=== Pre-season ===
==== Friendly ====
5 August 2018 Friendly	(England) Arsenal	5–0	(Italy) Juventus	Borehamwood, Hertfordshire
14:00 BST	Miedema 4', 45', 51', 69'; Little 66'			Stadium: Meadow Park

10 August 2018 Toulouse International Ladies Cup	(France) Montpellier	1–2	(England) Arsenal	Toulouse, France
19:30 BST	Blackstenius 22'		Miedema 45' van de Donk 75'	Stadium: Stade Ernest Wallon

12 August 2018 Toulouse International Ladies Cup	(France) Paris Saint-Germain	2–2	(England) Arsenal	Toulouse, France
15:30 BST	Lahmari 77'; Pekel 90'		Mead 20'; Little 90' (pen.)	Stadium: Stade Ernest Wallon

== Competitions ==
=== Overall record ===
Competition	First match	Last match	Starting round	Final position	Record							
Competition	First match	Last match	Starting round	Final position	Pld	W	D	L	GF	GA	GD	Win %
FA WSL	9 September 2018	11 May 2019	Matchday 1	Winners	20	18	0	2	70	13	+57	90.00
Women's FA Cup	3 February 2019	17 February 2019	Fourth round	Fifth round	2	1	0	1	4	3	+1	50.00
FA Women's League Cup	19 August 2018	23 February 2019	Group stage	Runners-up	7	6	0	1	24	4	+20	85.71
Total					29	25	0	4	98	20	+78	86.21

Source: FA WSL

=== FA WSL ===
==== League table ====
Pos	Team	Pld	W	D	L	GF	GA	GD	Pts	Qualification
1	Arsenal (C)	20	18	0	2	70	13	+57	54	Qualification for the Champions League knockout phase
2	Manchester City	20	14	5	1	53	17	+36	47	Qualification for the Champions League knockout phase
3	Chelsea	20	12	6	2	46	14	+32	42	
4	Birmingham City	20	13	1	6	29	17	+12	40	
5	Reading	20	8	3	9	33	30	+3	27	

Source: FA WSL
Rules for classification: 1) Points; 2) Goal difference; 3) Number of goals scored
(C) Champions

==== Results summary ====
Overall								Home						Away					
Pld	W	D	L	GF	GA	GD	Pts	W	D	L	GF	GA	GD	W	D	L	GF	GA	GD
20	18	0	2	70	13	+57	54	9	0	1	33	8	+25	9	0	1	37	5	+32

Last updated: 14 May 2019.
Source: FA WSL

==== Results by matchday ====
Matchday	1	2	3	4	5	6	7	8	9	10	11	12	13	14	15	16	17	18	19	20
Ground	H	A	H	A	H	A	H	A	H	A	A	H	A	H	H	A	A	H	A	H
Result	W	W	W	W	W	W	W	W	W	L	W	L	W	W	W	W	W	W	W	W
Position	1	1	1	1	1	1	1	1	1	1	1	2	2	2	2	1	1	1	1	1

Updated to match(es) played on 11 May 2019. Source: FA WSL
W = Win; D = Draw; L = Loss

==== Matches ====
9 September 2018 1	Arsenal	5–0	Liverpool	Borehamwood
12:30 BST	Miedema 6', 39', 89'; Evans 14'; Little 35'	Report	Fahey (yellow card) 80'	Stadium: Meadow Park; Attendance: 1,173; Referee: Jason Richardson
Note: Game televised on BBC Red Button

19 September 2018 2	Yeovil Town	0–7	Arsenal	Dorchester
19:45 BST		Report	Nobbs 5', 76'; Mead 20'; Miedema (yellow card) 34' (goal) 54'; McCabe 52'; Bloodworth 80'; Little 89'	Stadium: The Avenue Stadium; Attendance: 1,101; Referee: Scott Jackson

23 September 2018 3	Arsenal	4–3	West Ham United	Borehamwood
19:45 BST	Van de Donk 12', 41', 62'; Little 73'	Report	Longhurst 9', 17'; Rafferty 86'	Stadium: Meadow Park; Attendance: 1,081; Referee: Paul Howard
Note: Game streamed on FA WSL Facebook

14 October 2018 4	Chelsea	0–5	Arsenal	Kingston upon Thames
14:00BST	Spence (yellow card) 63'	Report	Little 21' (pen.); Miedema 38', 57'; Nobbs 52', 67'	Stadium: Kingsmeadow; Attendance: 2.020; Referee: Sam Purkiss
Note: Game televised on BT Sport

21 October 2018 5	Arsenal	6–0	Reading	Borehamwood
14:00 BST	Miedema 3', 49', 85'; Nobbs 7'; Mead 45'; Van de Donk 76'	Report	McGee (yellow card) 8'; Furness (yellow card) 45'	Stadium: Meadow Park; Attendance: 1.586; Referee: Abby Marriott
Note: Game televised on BBC Red Button

28 October 2018 6	Bristol City	0–4	Arsenal	Filton
15:00 GMT		Report	Nobbs 13'; Miedema 41', 88'; Van de Donk 90'	Stadium: Stoke Gifford Stadium; Attendance: 658; Referee: Daniel Lamport
Note: Game streamed on FA WSL Facebook

4 November 2018 7	Arsenal	3–1	Birmingham City	Borehamwood
12:30 GMT	Nobbs 59', 90+4'; Van de Donk 67' (pen.)	Report	Follis 60'; Mannion (yellow card) 67'; Staniforth (yellow card) 83'	Stadium: Meadow Park; Attendance: 1,431; Referee: Rebecca Welch
Note: Game televised on BBC Red Button

18 November 2018 8	Everton	0–4	Arsenal	Southport
12:30 GMT	Kelly (yellow card) 63'	Report	Van de Donk 44'; Nobbs 49'; Miedema 51', 65'	Stadium: Haig Avenue; Attendance: 370; Referee: Lucy Oliver
Note: Game televised on BBC Red Button

25 November 2018 9	Arsenal	4–1	Brighton & Hove Albion	Borehamwood
12:30 GMT	Miedema 24'; Bloodworth 33'; Van de Donk 39'; Mead 80'	Report	Umotong 9'	Stadium: Meadow Park; Attendance: 1,237; Referee: Rob Whitton
Note: Game televised on BBC Red Button

2 December 2018 10	Manchester City	2–0	Arsenal	Manchester
12:30 GMT	Stanway 18', 64'	Report	Mead (yellow card) 30'; Van de Donk (yellow card) 52'; Williamson (yellow card) 56'; McCabe (yellow card) 74'; Walti (yellow card) 89'	Stadium: Academy Stadium; Attendance: 2,149; Referee: Abby Marriott
Note: Game televised on BBC Red Button

6 January 2019 11	West Ham United	2–4	Arsenal	Romford
12:30 GMT	Ross 11', 43'; Lehmann (yellow card) 80'	Report	Williamson 26'; Arnth 31'; Van de Donk 59', 65' (yellow card) 77'	Stadium: The Rush Green Stadium; Attendance: 913; Referee: Will Finnie
Note: Game televised on BBC Red Button

13 January 2019 12	Arsenal	1–2	Chelsea	Borehamwood
12:30 GMT	Miedema 80'	Report	Cuthbert 26', 63'; Carney (yellow card) 38'; Ingle (yellow card) 80'	Stadium: Meadow Park; Attendance: 3,019; Referee: Rebecca Welch
Note: Game televised on BT Sport

27 January 2019 13	Reading	0–3	Arsenal	High Wycombe
12:30 GMT	Harding (yellow card) 60'; Allen (yellow card) 76'; Moore (yellow card) 80'	Report	Miedema 2'; Mitchell (yellow card) 23'; McCabe (yellow card) 37' (goal) 90+4'; Mead (yellow card) 74'; Little 80' (pen.)	Stadium: Adams Park; Attendance: 1,269; Referee: Lucy May
Note: Game televised on BBC Red Button

20 February 2019 14	Arsenal	3–0	Yeovil Town	Borehamwood
19:30 GMT	Little 59', 73' (pen.); Mead 71'	Report	Heatherson (yellow card) 38'; Short (yellow card) 64'; Cousins (yellow card) 73'	Stadium: Meadow Park; Attendance: 1,107; Referee: Kirsty Dowle

14 March 2019 15	Arsenal	4–0	Bristol City	Borehamwood
19:30 GMT	Miedema 11', 59', 78'; McCabe 76'	Report	Dykes (yellow card) 25'	Stadium: Meadow Park; Attendance: 1,019; Referee: Rob Whitton
Note: Game streamed on FA WSL Facebook

24 March 2019 16	Liverpool	1–5	Arsenal	Birkenhead
12:30 GMT	Sweetman-Kirk 76' (pen.); Linnett (yellow card) 78'	Report	Little 20'; Mead 22', 65'; Bloodworth 67'; Miedema 85'	Stadium: Prenton Park; Attendance: 506; Referee: Rebecca Welch
Note: Game televised on BT Sport

31 March 2019 17	Birmingham City	0–1	Arsenal	Solihull
12:30 BST	Mannion (yellow card) 2'; Harrop (yellow card) 32'; Ladd (yellow card) 64'	Report	Veje (yellow card) 70'; McCabe 79'	Stadium: Damson Park; Attendance: 1,520; Referee: Rebecca Welch
Note: Game televised on BBC Red Button

21 April 2019 18	Arsenal	2–1	Everton	Borehamwood
12:30 BST	Quinn 4'; Miedema 28'; Van de Donk (yellow card) 56'	Report	Stringer (yellow card) 56'; Boye-Hlorkah 61'; Finnigan (yellow card) 64'	Stadium: Meadow Park; Attendance: 2,003; Referee: Stacey Pearson
Note: Game televised on BBC Red Button

28 April 2019 19	Brighton & Hove Albion	0–4	Arsenal	Falmer
12:15 BST	Williams (yellow card) 40'	Report	Miedema 6'; McCabe 31'; Mead 70'; Van de Donk 76'; Schnaderbeck (yellow card) 90+1'	Stadium: AMEX Community Stadium; Attendance: 5,265; Referee: Lucy Oliver
Note: Game televised on BT Sport

11 May 2019 20	Arsenal	1–0	Manchester City	Borehamwood
12:30 BST	Miedema (yellow card) 86'; Mitchell 88'	Report	Hemp (yellow card) 77'; Campbell (yellow card) 90+4'	Stadium: Meadow Park; Attendance: 2,200; Referee: Rebecca Welch
Note: Game televised on BT Sport

=== FA Cup ===
3 February 2019 Fourth round	Crawley Wasps	0–4	Arsenal	Crawley
15:00 GMT		Report	Little 17'; Grant 43', 75', 86'	Stadium: Tinsley Lane; Attendance: 1,550

17 February 2019 Fifth round	Chelsea	3–0	Arsenal	Kingston upon Thames
14:00 GMT	England 4', 58'; Andersson 39'	Report	Mitchell (yellow card)	Stadium: Kingsmeadow; Attendance: 2,232; Referee: Paul Howard
Note: Game streamed on FA Cup Facebook

=== FA Women's League Cup ===
==== Group stage ====
Pos	Team	Pld	W	WPEN	LPEN	L	GF	GA	GD	Pts	Qualification	ARS	WHU	LEW	CHA	MIL
1	Arsenal	4	4	0	0	0	20	2	+18	12	Advance to knock-out stage	—	3–1	—	5–0	—
2	West Ham United	4	3	0	0	1	11	4	+7	9	Advance to knock-out stage	—	—	4–1	—	4–0
3	Lewes	4	2	0	0	2	8	13	−5	6		0–9	—	—	5–0	—
4	Charlton Athletic	4	1	0	0	3	4	14	−10	3		—	0–2	—	—	4–2
5	Millwall Lionesses	4	0	0	0	4	3	13	−10	0		1–3	—	0–2	—	—

Source: thefa.com
Rules for classification: 1) Points; 2) Goal difference; 3) Number of goals scored

19 August 2018 1	Arsenal	3–1	West Ham United	Borehamwood
14:00 BST	McCabe 12', 80'; Mead 44'	Report	Visalli 48'	Stadium: Meadow Park; Attendance: 450; Referee: Stephen Bates

16 September 2018 2	Lewes	0–9	Arsenal	Lewes
14:00 BST		Report	Van de Donk 6'; Miedema 21', 27', 60'; McCabe 26'; Little 37' (pen.), 45' (pen.), 68'; Evans 59'	Stadium: The Dripping Pan; Attendance: 945; Referee: Alex Blake

5 December 2018 3	Arsenal	5–0	Charlton Athletic	Borehamwood
19:45 GMT	Miedema 6', 76'; McCabe 30', 81'; Ritchie 59' (og.)	Report	Clifford (yellow card) 21'; Agg (yellow card) 26'	Stadium: Meadow Park; Referee: Lee Brennan

12 December 2018 4	Millwall Lionesses	1–3	Arsenal	Dartford
19:30 GMT	Bailes (yellow card) 22'; Ravenscroft 32'	Report	Miedema 55'; Grant 56'; Williamson 60'	Stadium: Princes Park; Attendance: 463; Referee: Dean Skipper

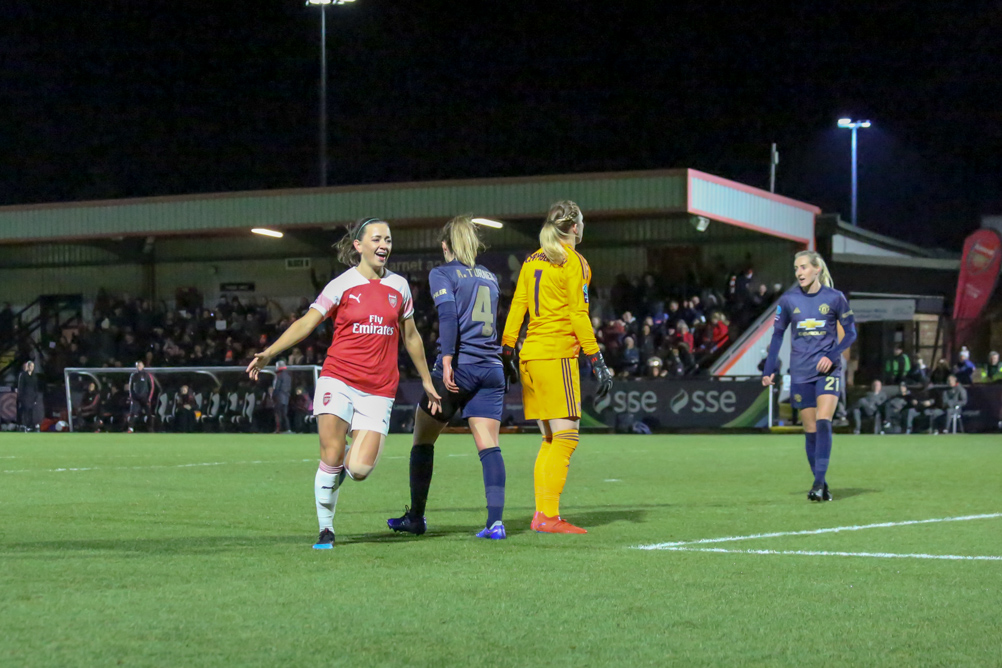
Katie McCabe celebrating after the team's first goal in the semi-final against Manchester United

==== Knockout rounds ====
9 January 2019 Quarter-finals	Arsenal	2–1	Birmingham City	Borehamwood
19:30 GMT	McCabe (yellow card) 42'; Van de Donk 84'; Miedema 90'	Report	Quinn 64' (yellow card) 90'	Stadium: Meadow Park; Referee: Wayne Cartmel

7 February 2019 Semi-finals	Arsenal	2–1	Manchester United	Borehamwood
19:30 GMT	Miedema 18', 60'	Report	Green 83'	Stadium: Meadow Park; Attendance: 1,836; Referee: Amy Fearn

23 February 2019 Final	Arsenal	0–0 (a.e.t.) (2–4 p)	Manchester City	Sheffield
12:15 GMT	Bloodworth (yellow card) 58'	Report	Stanway (yellow card) 40'; Parris (yellow card) 82'; Bardsley (yellow card) 120+5'	Stadium: Bramall Lane; Attendance: 2,424; Referee: Lucy Oliver
	Penalties
	Little (penalty scored); Williamson (penalty missed); van de Donk (penalty missed); Bloodworth (penalty scored)		(penalty scored) Stanway; (penalty missed) Hemp; (penalty scored) Emslie; (penalty scored) Houghton; (penalty scored) Beckie

== Personal awards ==
=== Professional Footballers' Association Players' Player of the Year ===
- Vivianne Miedema

=== Professional Footballers' Association Team of the Year ===
- Lia Wälti
- Kim Little
- Vivianne Miedema

=== London Football Awards Player of the Year ===
- Vivianne Miedema

=== Football Supporters' Federation Player of the Year ===
- Beth Mead

=== League Managers Association Manager of the Year ===
- Joe Montemurro

=== Monthly awards ===
==== FA Women's Super League Player of the Month ====
- Beth Mead, April 2019
- Beth Mead, March 2019
- Daniëlle van de Donk, November 2018
- Vivianne Miedema, October 2018

==== Professional Footballers' Association Fans' Player of the Month ====
- Jordan Nobbs, October 2018

==== League Managers Association Manager of the Month ====
- Joe Montemurro, March 2019
- Joe Montemurro, October 2018

== See also ==
- List of Arsenal W.F.C. seasons
- 2018–19 in English football
