= Mel Filis =

Irish footballer (born 2002)

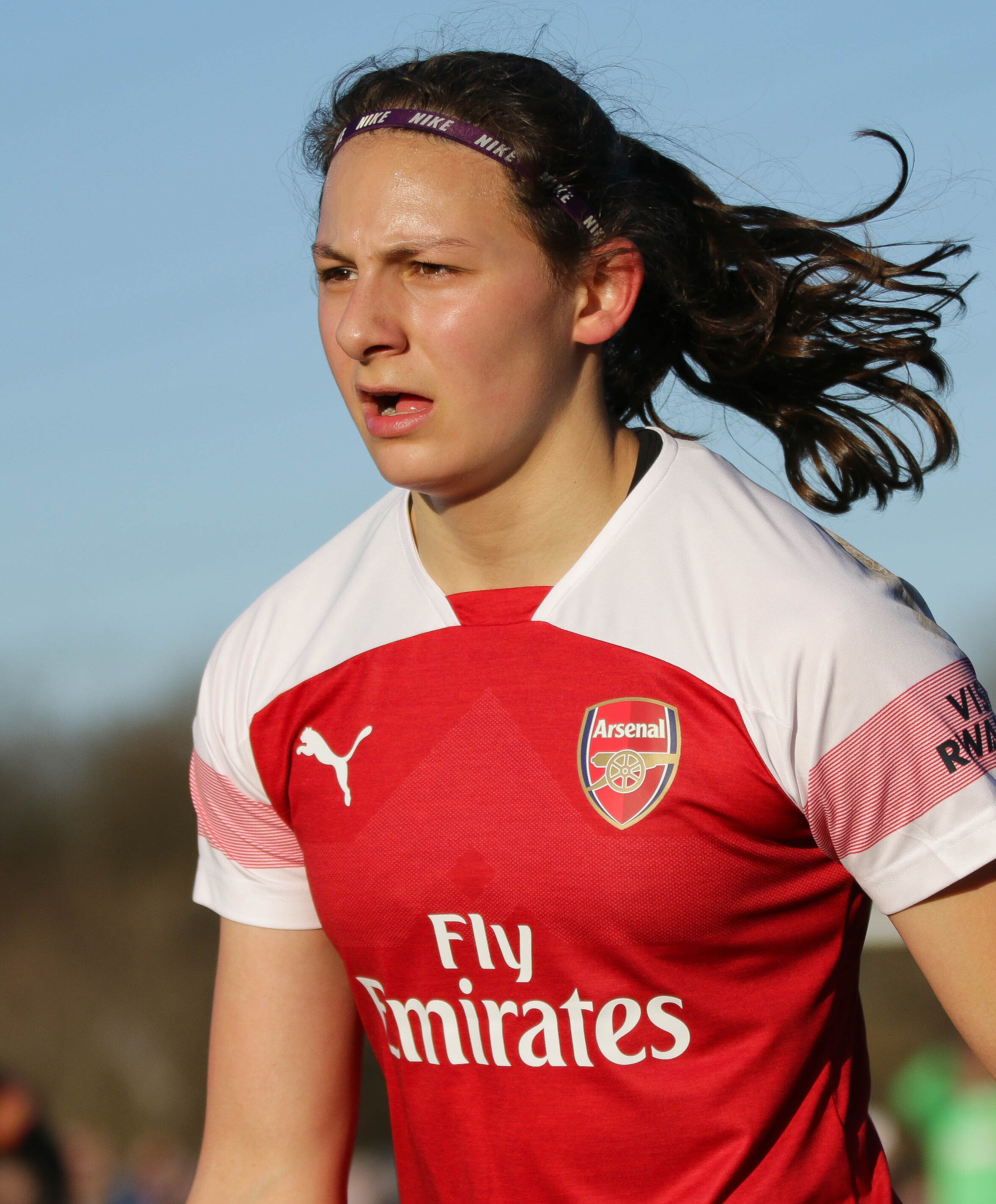
- Filis with Arsenal in 2019

Personal information
- Full name: Melisa Katie Filis
- Date of birth: 30 July 2002 (age 24)
- Place of birth: Essex, England
- Height: 1.74 m (5 ft 9 in)
- Position: Midfielder

Team information
- Current team: Wolverhampton Wanderers
- Number: 10

Youth career
- Arsenal

Senior career*
| Years | Team | Apps | (Gls) |
| 2018–2020 | Arsenal | 2 | (0) |
| 2020–2021 | London Bees | 20 | (2) |
| 2021–2024 | West Ham United | 37 | (0) |
| 2024 | → Charlton Athletic (loan) | 10 | (3) |
| 2024–2025 | Charlton Athletic | 17 | (1) |
| 2025–2026 | Sassuolo | 4 | (0) |
| 2026– | Wolverhampton Wanderers | 0 | (0) |

International career^{‡}
| 2018–2019 | England U17 | 15 | (16) |
| 2020 | England U19 | 2 | (0) |
| 2022–2023 | England U23 | 5 | (0) |
| 2025– | Republic of Ireland | 0 | (0) |
- * Club domestic league appearances and goals as of 18:33, 21 December 2025 (UTC) ‡ National team caps and goals as of 11 February 2025

Melisa Katie Filis (born 30 July 2002) is a professional footballer who plays as a midfielder for WSL 2 club Wolverhampton Wanderers. Born in England, she has opted to play for the Ireland national team.

== Club career ==
Coming through the Arsenal academy, Filis made her senior debut for the Gunners on 6 December 2018 as an 82nd-minute substitute during a 5–0 win over Charlton Athletic in the 2018–19 League Cup group stage. She made her FA WSL debut on 27 January 2019 against Reading Women at Adams Park, entering as a 93rd-minute substitute and providing an assist for Katie McCabe 22 seconds later to seal a 3–0 victory. Filis' only Arsenal goals came when she scored a hat-trick during a 9–0 win over London Bees in the 2019–20 League Cup group stage.

On 4 September 2020, Filis signed for FA Women's Championship side London Bees.

On 2 July 2021, Filis signed for West Ham United.

On 10 January 2024, Filis signed for Charlton Athletic on loan until the end of the 2023–24 season.

On 12 July 2024, Filis was announced at Charlton Athletic on a two-year contract. On 1 June 2025, it was announced that Filis would depart Charlton, having reached a mutual agreement with the club to leave a year before the expiry of her contract.

Filis was announced at Italian club Sassuolo on 25 July 2025.

On 7 July 2026, Filis was announced at WSL 2 club Wolverhampton Wanderers.

== International career ==
Born in England, Filis is of Turkish descent through her father, and of Irish descent through her mother. She holds dual British-Irish citizenship. She is a youth international for England, having played up to the England U19s. Filis was call up to the Ireland squad in February 2025 for Nations League games against Slovenia & Turkiye.

== Career statistics ==
=== Club ===
As of match played 17 December 2023

Appearances and goals by club, season and competition
| Club | Season | League | | | FA Cup | | League Cup | | Total | |
| Club | Season | Division | Apps | Goals | Apps | Goals | Apps | Goals | Apps | Goals |
|---|---|---|---|---|---|---|---|---|---|---|
| Arsenal | 2018–19 | Women's Super League | 1 | 0 | 1 | 0 | 2 | 0 | 4 | 0 |
| Arsenal | 2019–20 | Women's Super League | 1 | 0 | 1 | 0 | 2 | 3 | 4 | 3 |
| Arsenal | Total | | 2 | 0 | 2 | 0 | 4 | 3 | 8 | 3 |
| London Bees | 2020–21 | Championship | 20 | 2 | 0 | 0 | 3 | 0 | 23 | 2 |
| West Ham United | 2021–22 | Women's Super League | 19 | 0 | 2 | 1 | 4 | 1 | 25 | 2 |
| West Ham United | 2022–23 | Women's Super League | 9 | 0 | 2 | 0 | 5 | 0 | 16 | 0 |
| West Ham United | 2023–24 | Women's Super League | 9 | 0 | 0 | 0 | 2 | 0 | 11 | 0 |
| West Ham United | Total | | 37 | 0 | 4 | 1 | 9 | 1 | 52 | 2 |
| Career total | | | 59 | 2 | 6 | 1 | 16 | 4 | 83 | 7 |

== Honours ==
Arsenal

- Women's Super League: 2018–19
