= 2018–19 Brighton & Hove Albion W.F.C. season =

Brighton & Hove Albion
2018–19 season
- Chairman: Tony Bloom
- Manager: Hope Powell
- Stadium: Broadfield Stadium, Crawley
- WSL: 9th
- FA Cup: Fourth round
- League Cup: Quarter-final
Home colours	Away colours	Third colours

The 2018–19 Brighton & Hove Albion W.F.C season was the club's 28th season in existence and their second in the FA Women's Super League, the highest level of the football pyramid. Along with competing in the WSL, the club also contested the women's FA Cup and women's League Cup.

== Background ==
The 2018–19 season was a historic milstone not just for Brighton, but for English women's football, as it marked the first season the Women's Super League (WSL) was operated as a fully professional league. The Football Association implemented strict new criteria for clubs, including minimum contractual hours for players and financial investments.

== League standings ==
The club finished the season in ninth place.
