= Lia Wälti =

Swiss footballer (born 1993)

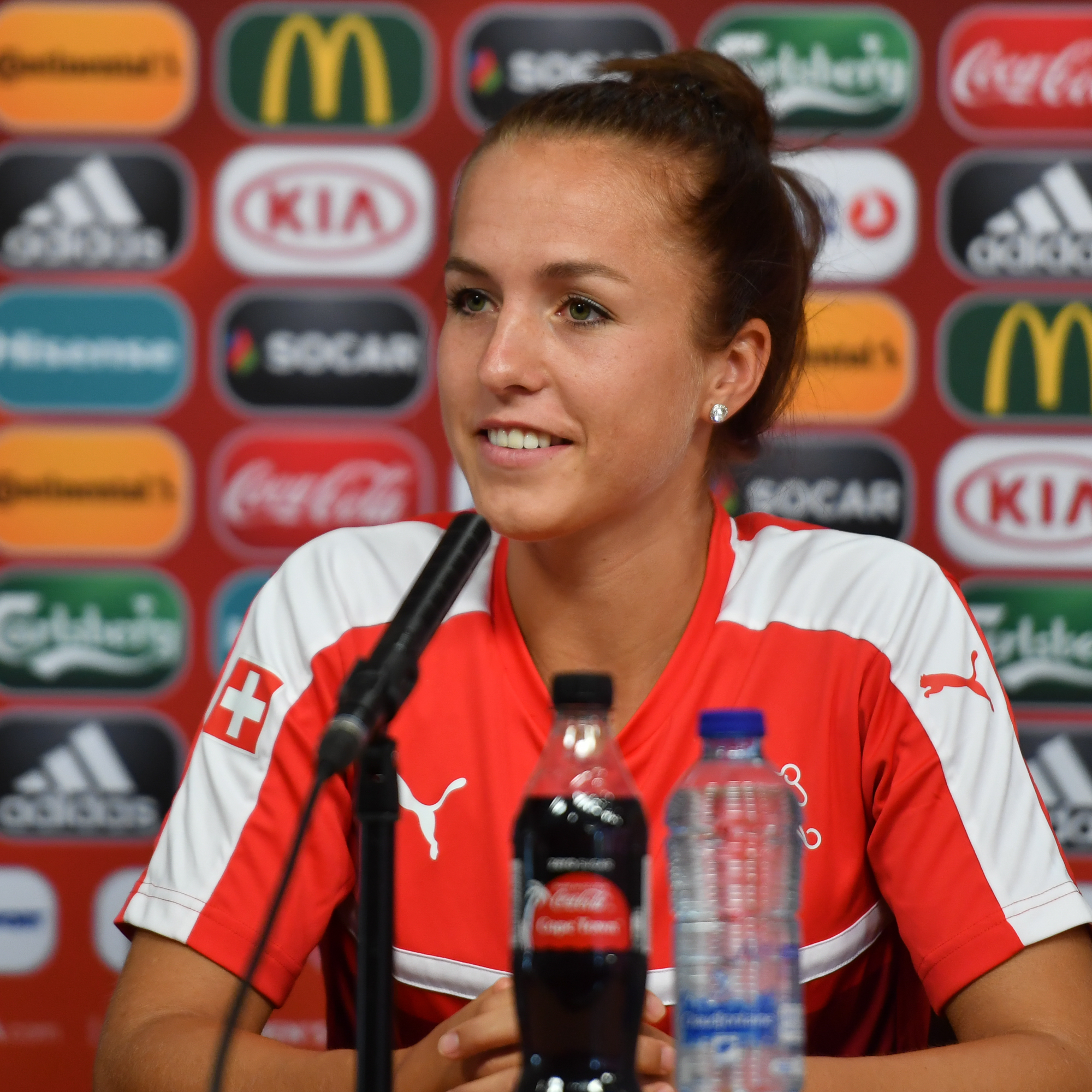
- Wälti during a press conference with Switzerland in 2017

Personal information
- Full name: Lia Joëlle Wälti
- Date of birth: 19 April 1993 (age 33)
- Place of birth: Langnau im Emmental, Bern, Switzerland
- Height: 1.67 m (5 ft 6 in)
- Position: Midfielder

Team information
- Current team: Brighton & Hove Albion
- Number: 13

Senior career*
Years	Team	Apps	(Gls)
2008–2009	Köniz		
2009–2013	YB Frauen		
2013–2018	Turbine Potsdam	97	(7)
2018–2025	Arsenal	183	(2)
2025–2026	Juventus	16	(0)
2026–	Brighton & Hove Albion	7	(0)

International career^{‡}
2011–	Switzerland	142	(5)
- * Club domestic league appearances and goals as of 22 November 2026 ‡ National team caps and goals as of 14 October 2026

Lia Joëlle Wälti (Swiss Standard German: [ˈliːa joˈɛlə ˈvɛlti]; born 19 April 1993) is a Swiss professional footballer who plays as a midfielder for Women's Super League club Brighton & Hove Albion and captains the Switzerland national team. Before signing for Arsenal in July 2018, she played for Nationalliga A club YB Frauen from 2009 until 2013 and for Bundesliga club Turbine Potsdam from 2013 until 2018.

She has been a member of the Switzerland national team since August 2011. As an Under-19 international she played the 2009 U-19 European Championship and the 2010 U-20 World Cup. In 2025, she captained Switzerland to their home European Championship, where they reached the quarter-finals.

In March 2026, Wälti co-founded the company WNXT Agency, a sports marketing agency specifically for female athletes.

== Club career ==
=== Early career ===
In her childhood, Wälti played ice hockey as well as football. In 2002, at the age of 8, she started playing for FC Langnau, a boys football team coached by her father. In 2007 she was admitted to the Huttwill Training Centre and, half a year later, she joined Team Bern West. In 2009 she moved to BSC Young Boys, where she played for a year in the U16 boys' team.

=== FC Köniz ===
At the same time she played for Team Bern West, Wälti joined FC Köniz of the Swiss Challenge League.

=== BSC YB Frauen ===
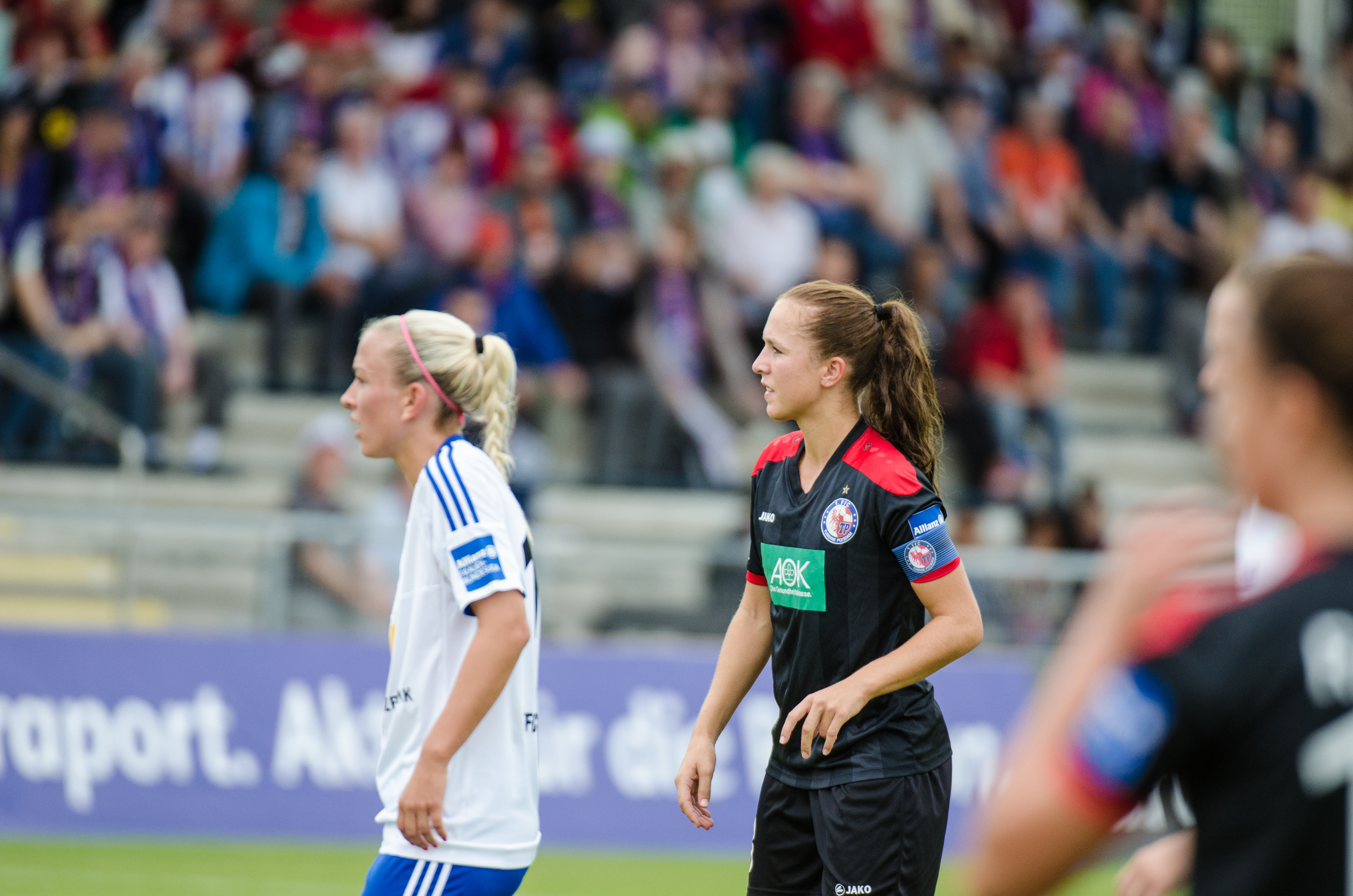
Lia Wälti for Turbine Potsdam

In 2009, Wälti joined BSC YB Frauen, where, in 2011, she won the Nationalliga A. In the same year, she debuted in the UEFA Women's Champions League.

=== Turbine Potsdam ===
In 2013, Wälti signed a contract with 1. FFC Turbine Potsdam of the Frauen-Bundesliga. She was named captain in her second season and played 110 games between 2013 and 2018.

=== Arsenal ===
After 110 appearances with the German team, Wälti signed a contract with Arsenal in July 2018. Wälti was instrumental in Arsenal's 2018–2019 WSL league winning season although only played half of the season after she suffered a LCL injury which kept her out of football for 9 months In April 2019. She was included in the 2018–2019 PFA Team of the Year. On 13 December 2019, Wälti signed a long-term contract with the club.

She later managed to achieve the 2024–25 UEFA Women's Champions League with the club. In September 2025, after 7 years and 183 appearances for Arsenal, Wälti announced her departure from the club.

=== Juventus ===
On 4 September 2025, Wälti joined Serie A side Juventus by signing a contract until 2027.

=== Brighton & Hove Albion ===
On 4 July 2026, Wälti returned to the Women's Super League by joining Brighton & Hove Albion for undisclosed terms.

== International career ==
=== Youth ===
Wälti played in the 2008 U-17 European Championship. She also played for the Switzerland U19 team in 2008 and 2009. She reached the semifinals in the 2009 U-19 European Championship. The next year, she joined the U20 team at the 2010 U-20 World Cup.

=== Senior ===
On 21 August 2011, Wälti made her debut for the Switzerland senior team in a match against Scotland. In 2015, she played at the World Cup. In 2019 after the retirement of Lara Dickenmann, she was named captain.

On 23 June 2025, Wälti was called up to the Switzerland squad for the UEFA Euro 2025.

== Personal life ==
Wälti carries her mother's surname, a former national handball player, while her father, Andreas Aebi, played football in the first division.

As a child Wälti played numerous sports outside of Football including Handball, Volleyball and Athletics. She stated that when she grew up she wanted to be either a kindergarten teacher or an ice hockey player. She used to attend SCL Tigers home matches as a child.

== Career statistics ==
=== Club ===
As of match played 22 November 2026

Appearances and goals by club, season and competition
Club	Season	League			National cup (Note: Includes DFB-Pokal Frauen, Coppa Italia)		League cup (Note: Includes League Cup)		Continental (Note: Includes Women's Champions League)		Other		Total	
Club	Season	Division	Apps	Goals	Apps	Goals	Apps	Goals	Apps	Goals	Apps	Goals	Apps	Goals
Turbine Potsdam	2013–14	Frauen-Bundesliga	19	0	1	0	—		6	2	—		26	2
Turbine Potsdam	2014–15	Frauen-Bundesliga	20	2	5	0	—		—		—		25	2
Turbine Potsdam	2015–16	Frauen-Bundesliga	22	3	3	0	—		—		—		25	3
Turbine Potsdam	2016–17	Frauen-Bundesliga	15	2	—		—		—		—		15	2
Turbine Potsdam	2017–18	Frauen-Bundesliga	21	0	3	0	—		—		—		24	0
Turbine Potsdam	Total		97	7	12	0	0	0	6	2	0	0	115	9
Arsenal	2018–19	WSL	12	0	0	0	5	0	—		—		17	0
Arsenal	2019–20	WSL	10	0	2	1	6	0	4	0	—		22	1
Arsenal	2020–21	WSL	20	0	1	0	3	0	—		—		24	0
Arsenal	2021–22	WSL	20	0	3	0	0	0	8	0	—		31	0
Arsenal	2022–23	WSL	18	1	1	0	1	0	11	0	—		31	1
Arsenal	2023–24	WSL	15	0	2	1	3	0	2	0	—		22	1
Arsenal	2024–25	WSL	18	0	3	0	2	0	10	1	—		33	1
Arsenal	Total		113	1	12	2	20	0	35	1	0	0	180	4
Juventus	2025–26	Serie A	16	0	5	0	0	0	7	0	1 (Note: Appearance in Supercoppa Italiana)	0	29	0
Brighton & Hove Albion	2026–27	WSL	7	0	0	0	4	0	—		—		11	0
Career total			233	8	29	2	24	0	48	3	1	0	335	13

=== International ===
Scores and results list Switzerland's goal tally first, score column indicates score after each Wälti goal.

List of international goals scored by Lia Wälti
No.	Date	Venue	Opponent	Score	Result	Competition
1	24 November 2011	Stadion Brügglifeld, Switzerland	Kazakhstan	4–0	8–1	UEFA Women's Euro 2013 qualifying
2	21 September 2013	Colovray Sports Centre, Switzerland	Serbia	4–0	9–0	2015 FIFA Women's World Cup qualification
3	11 March 2015	Estádio Municipal de Albufeira, Portugal	Brazil	1–2	1–4	2015 Algarve Cup
4	6 March 2017	Antonis Papadopoulos Stadium, Cyprus	Italy	3–0	6–0	2017 Cyprus Women's Cup
5	24 November 2017	LIPO Park, Schaffhausen, Switzerland	Belarus	2–0	3–0	2019 FIFA Women's World Cup qualification

== Honours ==
BSC YB Frauen

- Nationalliga A: 2010–11

Turbine Potsdam

- DFB-Pokal Frauen runners-up: 2014–15

Arsenal

- FA WSL: 2018–19
- FA Women's League Cup: 2022–23; runners-up: 2018–19, 2019–20
- UEFA Women's Champions League: 2024–25

Juventus

- Serie A Women's Cup: 2025
- Supercoppa Italiana: 2025

Individual

- PFA Team of the Year: 2018–19
- Swiss Female National Player: 2021, 2023
- Arsenal Player of the Month: January 2024
