= Ruby Grant =

English footballer (born 2002)

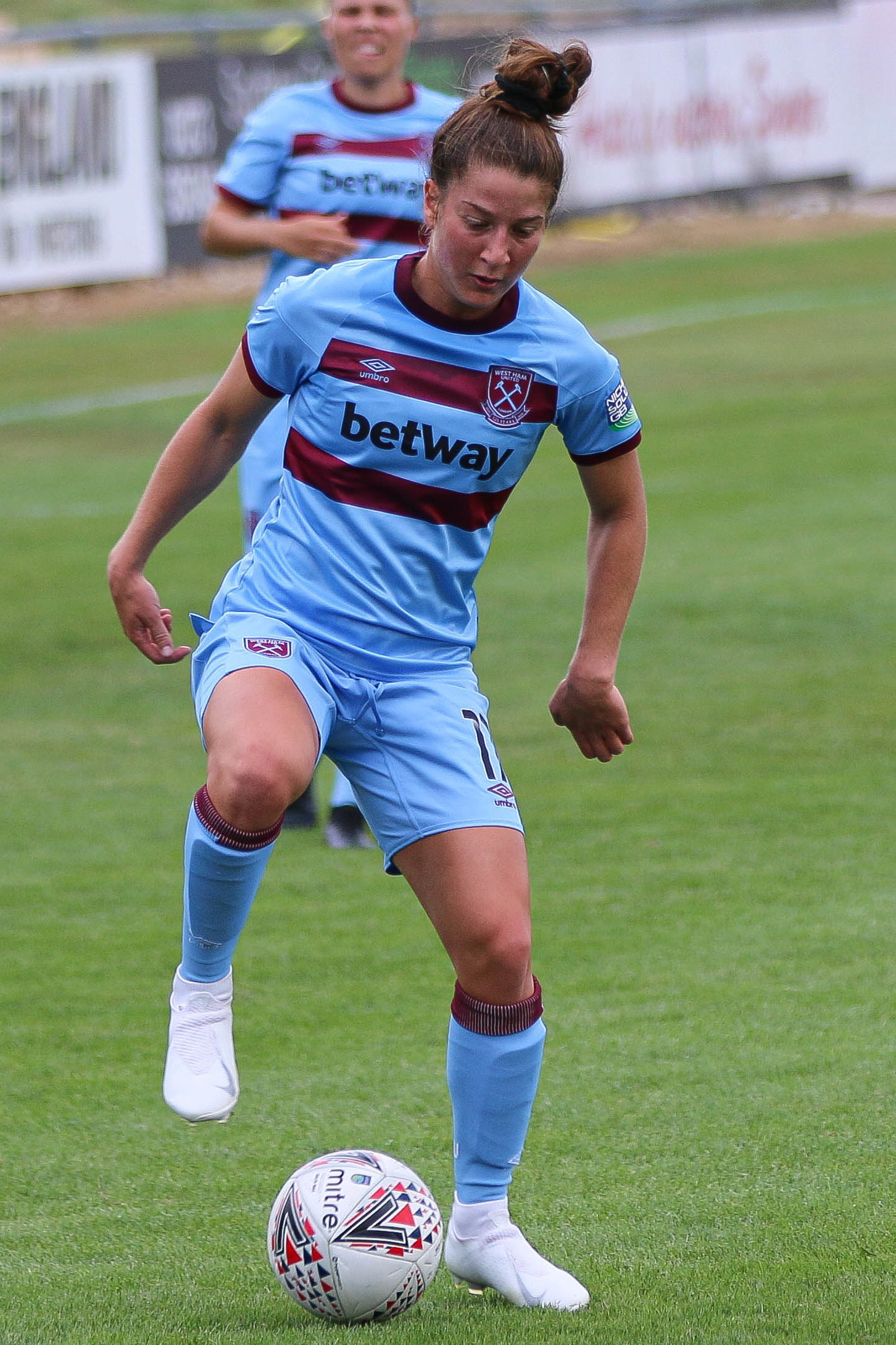
- Grant playing for West Ham in August 2020

Personal information
- Full name: Ruby Jayne Grant
- Date of birth: 15 April 2002 (age 24)
- Place of birth: London, England
- Height: 1.63 m (5 ft 4 in)
- Position: Midfielder

Team information
- Current team: Sporting CP
- Number: 8

Youth career
- 2011–2018: Arsenal

College career
Years	Team	Apps	(Gls)
2021–2022	North Carolina Tar Heels	37	(6)

Senior career*
Years	Team	Apps	(Gls)
2018–2020	Arsenal	2	(0)
2020–2021	West Ham United	6	(0)
2023–2025	BK Häcken	37	(3)
2025–2026	Bayer Leverkusen	33	(1)
2026–	Sporting CP	6	(0)

International career^{‡}
2018–2019	England U17	15	(6)
2020–2021	England U19	2	(0)
2022–	England U23	12	(1)
- * Club domestic league appearances and goals as of 22 November 2026 ‡ National team caps and goals as of 22:57, 3 April 2025 (UTC)

Ruby Jayne Grant (born 15 April 2002) is an English professional footballer who plays as a midfielder for Campeonato Nacional Feminino club Sporting CP and the England under-23s. Grant has represented England since under-17 level and previously played for Bayer Leverkusen in Germany, BK Häcken in Sweden, the North Carolina Tar Heels in the United States college soccer system, as well as Women's Super League clubs West Ham United and Arsenal in England.

== Early life ==
Grant attended Livingstone Primary School, in Barnet, London. In 2013, aged 10, she captained the Year Six girls first team, scoring 35 of the team’s 47 goals. She also featured in the school's mixed team. Grant is otherwise a product of the Arsenal Academy, having won the FA Youth Cup in 2017.

== Club career ==
Grant made her first-team debut for Women's Super League club Arsenal during the 2018–19 season in a 4–0 away win against Everton in the FA WSL, appearing as an 82nd minute substitute for Jordan Nobbs. In February 2019, Grant scored a hat trick in a 4–0 FA Cup win against Crawley Wasps in the fourth round proper, her debut in the competition.

Having agreed to join US college team North Carolina Tar Heels, Grant signed a short-term deal with West Ham United ahead of the 2020–21 season after training with the team during the COVID-19 pandemic. She left West Ham in January 2021 at the conclusion of her contract, with eight appearances in all competitions, including two league starts.

Grant joined NCAA Division I side North Carolina Tar Heels in January 2021 for Spring 2021 season, after the conclusion of the 2020 season was delayed by the COVID-19 pandemic. She made her college debut in a 5–0 win over Delaware on 20 March 2021, and opened her scoring for the Tar Heels with three goals in a 7–0 win against Tennessee on 27 March 2021.

In March 2023, Grant joined Damallsvenskan side Häcken on a three-year deal. Having appeared twice in the Svenska Cupen Damer, she made her league debut on 26 March, appearing as a substitute in a 1–0 defeat to Djurgården.

On 12 January 2025, Grant signed for Frauen-Bundesliga club Bayer Leverkusen until June 2027. She scored once across 36 matches across all competitions in her one-and-a-half-year stint in Germany.

In September 2026, Grant moved to Sporting CP of the Portuguese Campeonato Nacional Feminino.

== International career ==
Grant has previously represented England at under-17 and under-19 level. For 2019 U19 Championship qualification with the under-17s, Grant scored goals against Moldova and Azerbaijan in September 2018, followed by another goal against Greece in the elite qualifying round in March 2019.

In March 2023, Grant was called up to the under-23 side for fixtures against Portugal and Belgium.

== Career statistics ==
=== Club ===
As of 1 November 2026

Appearances and goals by club, season and competition
Club	Season	League			National cup (Note: Includes Women's FA Cup, Svenska Cupen, DFB-Pokal Frauen)		League Cup		Continental		Total	
Club	Season	Division	Apps	Goals	Apps	Goals	Apps	Goals	Apps	Goals	Apps	Goals
Arsenal	2018–19	FA WSL	2	0	1	3	2	1	—		5	4
Arsenal	2019–20	FA WSL	0	0	0	0	2	0	0	0	2	0
Arsenal	Total		2	0	1	3	4	1	0	0	7	4
West Ham United	2020–21	FA WSL	6	0	0	0	2	0	—		8	0
West Ham United	Total		6	0	0	0	2	0	—		8	0
BK Häcken	2023	Damallsvenskan	25	1	3	0	—		6 (Note: Appearances in UEFA Women's Champions League)	0	34	1
BK Häcken	2024	Damallsvenskan	22	2	4	0	—		1 (Note: Appearances in UEFA Women's Champions League qualifying)	0	27	2
BK Häcken	Total		47	3	7	0	0	0	7	0	61	3
Bayer Leverkusen	2024–25	Frauen-Bundesliga	11	0	1	0	—		—		12	0
Bayer Leverkusen	2025–26	Frauen-Bundesliga	22	1	2	0	—		—		24	1
Bayer Leverkusen	Total		33	1	3	0	0	0	0	0	36	1
Sporting CP	2026–27	Campeonato Nacional Feminino	6	0	0	0	1	0	2	0 (Note: appearances in UEFA Women's Europa Cup)	9	0
Career total			94	4	11	3	7	1	9	0	121	8

== Honours ==
Arsenal

- Women's Super League: 2018–19
