= Joe Montemurro =

Australian soccer player and manager

Joseph Adrian Montemurro
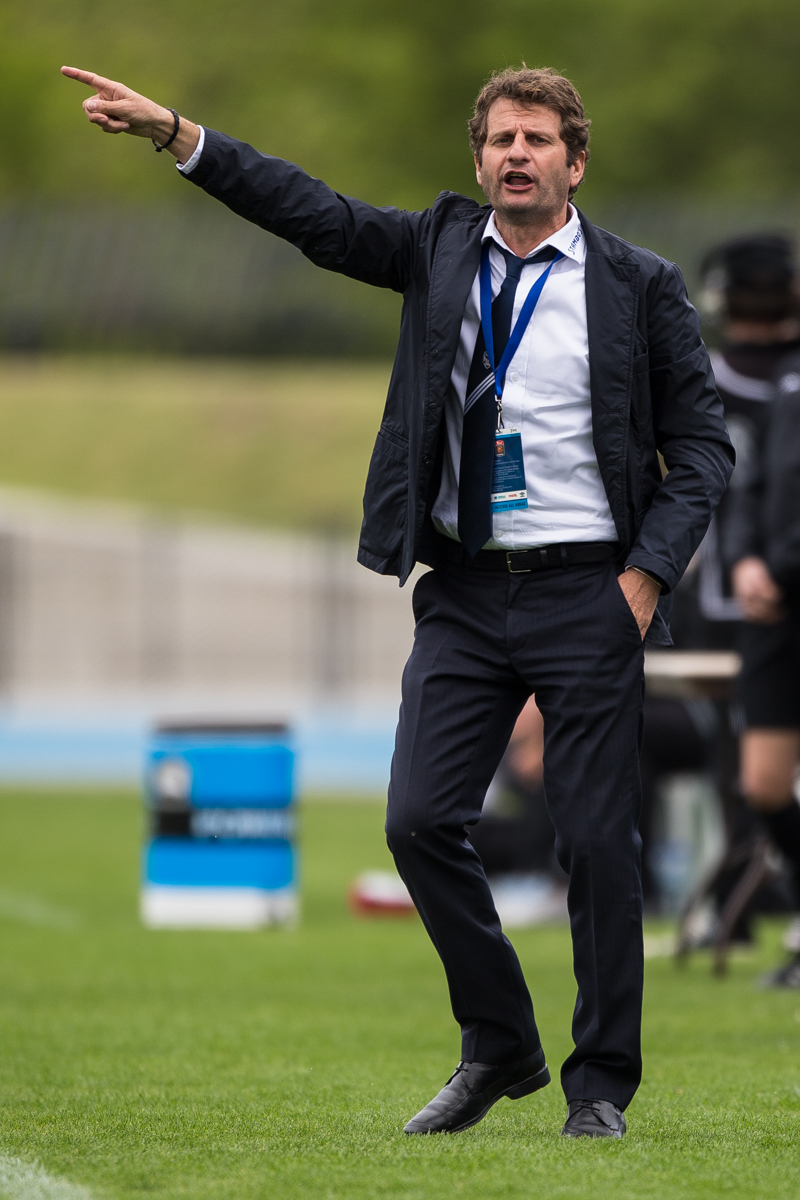
- Montemurro as head coach of Melbourne Victory Women in 2014

Personal information
- Full name: Joseph Adrian Montemurro
- Birth name: Joseph Adrian Montemurro
- Date of birth: 13 September 1969 (age 57)
- Place of birth: Melbourne, Australia
- Height: 1.78 m (5 ft 10 in)
- Position: Midfielder

Team information
- Current team: Australia Women (head coach)

Youth career
- 1979–1986: Brunswick Juventus
- 1987: Neuchâtel Xamax
- 1988: Potenza

Senior career*
Years	Team	Apps	(Gls)
1989-91	Brunswick Juventus	22	(0)
1991–1994	US Opitergina	58	(3)

Managerial career
- 2006–2007: Sunshine George Cross
- 2008–2009: Coburg United
- 2013–2014: Melbourne Victory Women
- 2014–2017: Melbourne City Women
- 2017–2021: Arsenal Women
- 2021–2024: Juventus Women
- 2024–2025: Lyon Women
- 2025–: Australia Women
- * Club domestic league appearances and goals

Joseph Adrian Montemurro (born 13 September 1969), nicknamed Pepe, is an Australian soccer coach and former player who has been the head coach of the Australian women's national team since June 2025.

Montemurro had played as a midfielder, mainly in Italy in the 1990s, before returning to Australia to play for Victorian State League teams. He began coaching in youth football for various Victorian clubs in 2002 and was promoted to men's teams by 2006. From 2014 to 2017, he managed the women's sides of Melbourne Victory and then Melbourne City. He replaced Pedro Martínez Losa in 2017 as manager of Arsenal Women, where he won the league title in his second season. In 2021, Montemurro moved to Italy to manage Juventus Women, and in 2024, he became coach of the French side, Olympique Lyonnais Féminin the first non-French coach in the club's history. He won league titles at all three European clubs.

== Playing career ==
Montemurro spent his entire junior playing career at Brunswick Juventus and made his first senior appearance for the club in 1986 in the National Soccer League as a 16-year-old. He was also a member of the Victorian State Youth team between 1986 and 1988, which won two national titles.

In 1987 he declined a scholarship at the Australian Institute of Sport, to remain at Brunswick Juventus. In 1988, he was spotted by Swiss club Neuchâtel Xamax youth team and accepted the opportunity to play in Europe in the following year. After two years back at Brunswick, he transferred to Italian Serie C2 club Potenza before spending five years at Opitergina (1992–1996), in the Italian non-professional Leagues.

Montemurro returned to Australia in 1996 and resumed playing in the Victorian State league teams while continuing his coaching education. He has UEFA A and UEFA Pro Licences, which he attained in Florence, Italy, alongside a Master of Sports Coaching from Queensland University.

== Managerial career ==
=== Early years coaching in Victoria ===
Montemurro retired from playing at age 28. His first coaching position commenced at his former junior club Brunswick Juventus. His first major role was as youth coach (U21) in the Victorian Premier league with Green Gully, which he took to the runner-up position in his first year.

In the 2002–2003 season he took over the youth team at Melbourne Knights in the National Soccer League, which he guided to a Southern Division Championship. The team lost the playoff for National Youth Champions. The demise of the National League occurred and the club offered Montemurro the senior position in the Victorian Premier League. He opted to continue his youth coaching with local rivals South Melbourne, which he guided to the runner-up position in 2005.

In mid-2006, Montemurro was approached by Sunshine George Cross to take over their firsts team and save it from relegation. He succeeded and continued his position until mid-2007. His next role was head coach of Coburg United in Victorian State League 1, which he guided to their first ever promotion to top flight football in the club's 30-year history.

In 2010, he returned to South Melbourne as a youth coach and guided that team to a historic undefeated season as champions. He was promoted to assistant senior coach at South, in which VPL finals appearances and the quarter finals of the Singapore Cup were achieved during his tenure. During 2013, he took over new franchise club FC Port Moresby in the Papua New Guinea National Soccer League. The club finished third in the league, qualifying for the championship playoffs, where they reached the final, only to lose 3–0 to Hekari United.

=== Melbourne Victory and Melbourne City ===
In 2014, Montemurro returned to Melbourne and was appointed National Training Centre head coach for women's football in Victoria. He became head coach of the Melbourne Victory FC W-League on 16 May 2014, and guided it to the runner-up position after the home and away fixture, the highest finish in the club's history. The team lost the semi-final playoff on penalties to Canberra United.

After the 2014 season, Montemurro left Victory to join local rivals Melbourne City taking up a position as the manager of their youth side. Following City joining the W-League (renamed in 2021 as A-League Women) in 2015, Montemurro was appointed as head coach of their inaugural women's side. In its maiden season, the City women were crowned 2015–16 W-League Premiers. On 31 January 2016, City completed the double by defeating Sydney 4–1 in the grand final of the W-League Women's Championship. W-League history was created as the team went the entire season winning every game, amassing 42 goals and conceding 5.

In June 2016, Montemurro's role at City was expanded to include assisting John van 't Schip with the senior men's team. His responsibilities changed in January 2017, becoming City's chief assistant coach under new manager Michael Valkanis, while relinquishing his W-League coaching role.

=== Arsenal Women ===
In November 2017, Montemurro left Melbourne City to join Arsenal Women as manager, after Pedro Martínez Losa was sacked following a poor start to the season. On 14 March 2018, he won his first major trophy with Arsenal by beating Manchester City 1–0 to win the FA Women's League Cup. On 15 May 2018, he led Arsenal to the Women's FA Cup final in front of a record attendance of 45,423 at Wembley Stadium, in which they lost 3–1 to Chelsea.

In August 2018, in his first full preseason in charge of Arsenal Women, the team were crowned champions of the Toulouse International Ladies Cup, beating UEFA Women's Champions League quarter-finalists Montpellier and holding Paris Saint Germain to a 2–2 draw.

In the 2018–19 season, Arsenal became the first FA WSL team to win 9 games straight, amassing 42 goals and conceding five. The winning streak came to an end when an injury stricken squad lost away to Manchester City. The attacking style and fluidity of possession instilled by Montemurro won many accolades. On 7 February 2019, the team reached its second consecutive Continental Cup League final, beating Manchester United 2–1 at Meadow Park. After a scoreless draw in the final at Sheffield's Bramall Lane, the team was defeated 4–2 in a penalty shootout against Manchester City. In the same month, Montemurro was nominated for Manager of the Year at the London Football Awards, alongside Maurizio Sarri and Mauricio Pochettino; he was the first coach from the WSL to be nominated for the Awards. On 31 March, Arsenal qualified for the UEFA Women's Champions League after a five-year absence, with a 1–0 win over Birmingham City. In front of a record WSL crowd against Brighton & Hove Albion at the Falmer Stadium, goals from Vivianne Miedema, Katie McCabe, Beth Mead and Daniëlle van de Donk, secured the WSL title with a round in advance; it was Arsenal's first title since 2012. The season was also capped off with Montemurro winning the WSL League Managers Association (LMA) Coach of the Year.

In July 2019, Montemurro was nominated as FIFA World Women's Coach of the year. The 2019–20 season saw Arsenal continue in the same fashion as the previous season, having qualified for the quarter-finals of the UEFA Champions League. The team was also part of a record-breaking WSL attendance, when 38,200 spectators came to watch the first ever North London derby at Tottenham Stadium; Arsenal won the match 2–0. Another record was broken on 1 December 2019, when they beat Bristol 11–1 at Meadow Park, the highest winning margin in the WSL. In March 2021, it was announced that Montemurro was to leave the club at the end of the 2020–21 season. Despite retaining the support of the Arsenal board, Montemurro decided to leave the club in order to take a break and spend more time with his family. He left the club having qualified for the 2021–22 UEFA Women's Champions League.

=== Juventus Women ===
On 8 June 2021, Montemurro was appointed head coach of Italian Serie A side Juventus Women. Montemurro's first official match as Juventus' manager came on 18 August, in a 12–0 win against Macedonian Women's Football Championship side Kamenica Sasa in the semi-finals of the first round of UEFA Women's Champions League. Montemurro's first trophy as Juventus coach came, the Supercoppa Italiana on 8 January 2022 after a 2–1 win against AC Milan. The team went on to win the Serie A and Italian Cup completing the club's first ever treble winning season. The biggest achievement for the team in the 21/22 season was qualification to the quarter finals stage of the UEFA Women's Champions League. Grouped with Chelsea, Wolfburg and Servette, the team's 2–0 win Germany and the 0–0 draw in London earned the team second spot in group A and effectively knocking out Chelsea. The team won the first leg of the quarter final v Lyon 2–1 at the Allianz stadium in Turin but lost 3–1 at the Groupama Stadium in Lyon. The team came Runners up in the league in the 22/23 season yet winning the Coppa Italia for a second season in succession. The 2023/24 season saw the team win the Supercoppa beating AS Roma 2–1 in Cremona. On 6 March 2024, Montemurro left the club by mutual agreement with two more seasons to run on his contract.

While a free agent in May 2024, he managed the A-League All Stars Women in their friendly match against his former club, Arsenal Women's, at Docklands Stadium, Melbourne. Arsenal Women's won 0–1, with the goal scored by Alessia Russo.

=== Olympique Lyonnais Féminin ===
On 19 June 2024, it was announced that Montemurro would become manager of Olympique Lyonnais (OL) Féminin, succeeding Sonia Bompastor. The team advanced to the semi-final stage of the UEFA Women's Champions League, winning all group stage games and both quarter-final games. They were ultimately eliminated on aggregate by Arsenal, losing the second leg of the semi-final. Montemurro won the Première Ligue in his first season with OL, securing their 18th title.

OL announced the departure of Montemurro on 1 June 2025, with one year to go on his contract. With Lyon winning Première Ligue, the coach has won three different league titles with three different European teams.

=== Australia Women ===
On 2 June 2025, Football Australia unveiled Montemurro as the permanent head coach of the Matildas, replacing interim coach Tom Sermanni. He officially began managing the team on 16 June ahead of a set of two home games each against Slovenia (26 and 29 June) and Panama (5 and 8 July). Under his management the Matildas adopted a possession-based strategy, in preparation for Australia hosting the 2026 Asian Cup in March.

On 21 March 2026, Montemurro led the Matildas to the final of the 2026 AFC Women's Asian Cup on home soil. After defeating China 2–1 in the semi-final, Australia faced Japan in the final at Stadium Australia. The match ended in a 1–0 defeat following a 17th-minute goal by Maika Hamano.

== Personal life ==
Montemurro was born in 1969 in Melbourne, the youngest of three children, to Paolo Giuseppe (1934–2016) and Maria Montemurro (1933–2018). He is of Italian descent; his parents had separately emigrated from southern Italy to settle in Melbourne, following World War II. Montemurro became an Arsenal supporter at the age of seven, when his oldest brother Anthony returned home with a replica kit. The 1979 FA Cup Final, in which Arsenal beat Manchester United 3–2, served as an inspiration for Montemurro to pursue a career in football. He attended St Anthony's Primary School, Fairfield, and completed secondary education at Parade College in 1987.

Montemurro completed the Master of Sports Coaching degree at the University of Queensland, and later undertook a PhD at the University of Loughborough with a focus on sports psychology performance.

In 2010, he completed his UEFA A licence at Coverciano, via the Italian Football Federation (FIGC). He also completed his UEFA Pro Licence at Coverciano in July 2014, and is a member of the Italian Coaches Association. He holds an AFC/FFA A Licence.

Montemurro married Linda, and they have two children.

== Career statistics ==
=== Manager ===
As of match played 13 October 2026

Managerial record by team and tenure
Team	From	To	Record								Ref
Team	From	To	G	W	D	L	GF	GA	GD	Win %	Ref
Melbourne Victory Women	14 May 2014	March 2015	14	6	3	5	26	20	+6	42.86	
Melbourne City Women	1 July 2015	4 January 2017	27	20	3	4	62	19	+43	74.07	
Arsenal Women	November 2017	16 May 2021	76	58	6	12	223	55	+168	76.32	
Juventus Women	8 June 2021	6 March 2024	41	33	5	3	109	31	+78	80.49	
Lyon (women)	19 June 2024	1 June 2025	43	37	4	2	151	23	+128	86.05	
Australia (women)	16 June 2025	present	20	13	2	5	44	21	+23	65.00	
Total			221	167	23	31	615	169	+446	75.57	

== Honours ==
=== Manager ===
Melbourne City Women

- W-League Premier: 2015–16
- W-League Champion: 2015–16, 2016–17

Arsenal Women

- FA Women's Super League: Champion 2018–19, Runner Up 2019–20. 2020–21.
- FA Women's League Cup: Champion 2017–18; Runner Up: 2018–19; 2019–20
- FA Women's Cup : Runner Up: 2017–18; 2020–21

Juventus Women

- Serie A: Champion 2021–22 : Runner Up 2022–23. 2023–24.
- Coppa Italia: Champions 2021–22, 2022–23
- Supercoppa Italiana Champions : 2021–22; 2023–24 : Runner Up 2022–23

Olympique Lyonnais Féminin Women

- Première Ligue: Champion 2024–25

Australia Women

- AFC Women's Asian Cup: Runners-up: 2026

Individual

- LMA Manager of the Month (WSL): October 2018, March 2019 December 2019, October 2020, March 2021, April 2021
- League Managers Association Manager of the Year 2018\2019
- The Best FIFA Football Coach nominee: 2019
- UEFA Women's Coach of the Year nominee: 2019–20
- London Football Awards Manager of the Year nominee: 2019, 2020
- FIGC "Panchina Doro" Serie A Femminile Manager of the Year: 2021–22
