= Janni Arnth =

Danish footballer (born 1986)

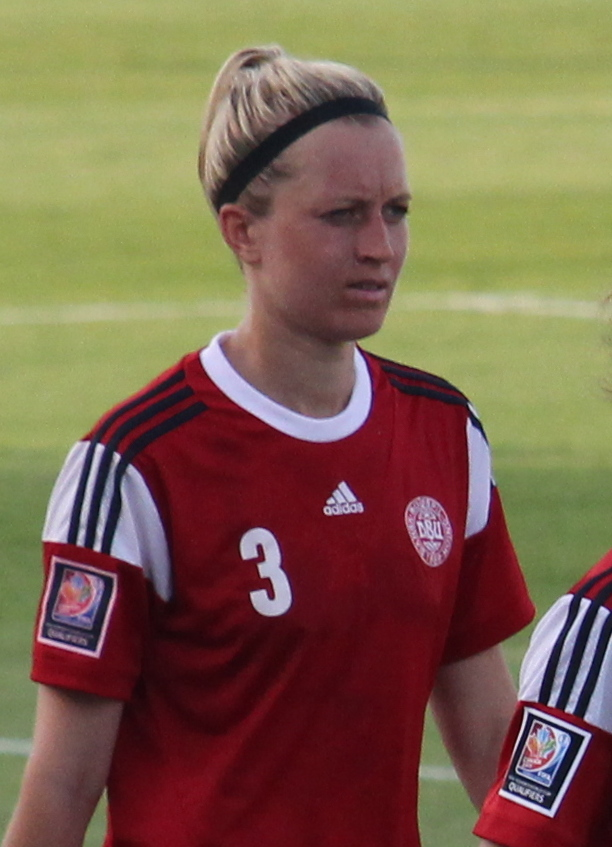
- Arnth in 2014

Personal information
- Full name: Janni Arnth Jensen
- Date of birth: 15 October 1986 (age 40)
- Place of birth: Outrup, Denmark
- Height: 1.74 m (5 ft 9 in)
- Position: Defender

Youth career
- 1992–2002: Outrup BK

Senior career*
Years	Team	Apps	(Gls)
2002–2006	Varde IF	121	
2007–2014	Fortuna Hjørring	215	
2014–18	Linköpings FC	126	(6)
2019	Arsenal	12	(1)
2019–2021	Fiorentina	24	(1)
2021–2022	Rangers	11	(1)

International career^{‡}
2003	Denmark U-17	11	(0)
2004–2005	Denmark U-19	16	(0)
2009	Denmark U-23	1	(0)
2010–2019	Denmark	93	(2)
Medal record
Women's football
Representing Denmark
UEFA Women's Championship
Silver medal – second place	2017 Netherlands	Team
- * Club domestic league appearances and goals as of Retirement ‡ National team caps and goals as of 25 October 2019

Janni Arnth Jensen (born 15 October 1986) is a Danish former footballer who played as a defender. She played for Danish A-Liga club Fortuna Hjørring, Swedish Damallsvenskan club Linköpings FC, English Women's Super League club Arsenal, in Italy with Fiorentina, and with Rangers in the Scottish Women's Premier League. She was the vice-captain for the Danish national team.

== Club career ==
She played for Fortuna Hjørring after joining in January 2007, following spells at Outrup BK and Varde IF.

In August 2014, Arnth Jensen signed for Linköpings FC and made her debut for the club in the 2014 Svenska Cupen (English: Swedish Cup) final, where Linköpings came from behind to defeat Kristianstads DFF 2–1. She won the 2016 Damallsvenskan title with Linköpings and signed a new two-year contract with the club in November 2016. Following Magdalena Eriksson's departure mid-season in 2017, Arnth was named the new captain of Linköpings FC.

In November 2018 Arnth signed to play with English WSL club Arsenal and became WSL champion the summer of 2019

After a spell with Italian club Fiorentina, Arnth signed for Scottish club Rangers in September 2021. On 27 September 2022, she announced her retirement from football.

== International career ==
At the girls' football tournament at the 2003 European Youth Olympic Festival, Arnth Jensen played in the final as Denmark beat Switzerland on penalties after a 1–1 draw at Stade Sébastien Charléty in Paris.

Arnth Jensen made her senior international debut in January 2010, in a 2–1 win over Chile. She was named in national coach Kenneth Heiner-Møller's Denmark squad for UEFA Women's Euro 2013.

Janni Arnth represented Denmark 93 times and for a number of years as vice captain. She scored the decisive penalty against France UEFA Women's Euro 2013 which gave Denmark a spot in the Semifinals and was also part of the team that reached the Final in UEFA Women's Euro 2017.

== Honours ==
=== Club ===
Fortuna Hjørring

Winner

- Elitedivisionen: 2008–2009, 2009–10, 2013–2014

Winner

- Danish Women's Cup: 2007–2008

Runner-up

- Elitedivisionen: 2011–12, 2012–13
- Danish Women's Cup: 2012–13

Linköpings FC

Winner

- Damallsvenskan: 2016, 2017
- Swedish Women's Cup: 2013–14

Arsenal

Winner

- WSL: 2018–19

Rangers

Winner

- Scottish Women's Premier League: 2021-22,
