= Amelia Ritchie =

Welsh footballer (born 1999)

Personal information
- Date of birth: 9 May 1999 (age 27)
- Position: Defender

Senior career*
Years	Team	Apps	(Gls)
2017–2018	Brighton & Hove Albion	5	(0)
2018–2019	Charlton Athletic	15	(1)

International career^{‡}
2015	Wales U17	3	(0)
2017–2018	Wales U19	6	(0)
2015	Wales	2	(0)
- * Club domestic league appearances and goals as of 11 May 2019 ‡ National team caps and goals as of 8 April 2018

Amelia Ritchie (born 9 May 1999) is a Welsh footballer who plays as a defender. She has been a member of the Wales women's national team.
