= 2018–19 FA Women's League Cup =

Tournament details
- Country: England
- Dates: 18 August 2018 – 23 February 2019
- Teams: 22

Final positions
- Champions: Manchester City
- Runners-up: Arsenal

Tournament statistics
- Matches played: 57
- Goals scored: 218 (3.82 per match)
- Attendance: 32,012 (562 per match)
- Top goal scorer: (Netherlands) Vivianne Miedema Arsenal (9 Goals)

The 2018–19 FA Women's League Cup was the eighth edition of the FA Women's Super League and FA Women's Championship's league cup competition. It was sponsored by Continental AG, who sponsored the competition from its creation, and was officially known as the FA Continental Tyres League Cup. All 22 teams of the FA Women's Super League and FA Women's Championship contest the competition - the largest field in its history.

Arsenal were the defending champions; only they and Manchester City had won the cup in the previous seven seasons it was contested in.

== Format changes ==
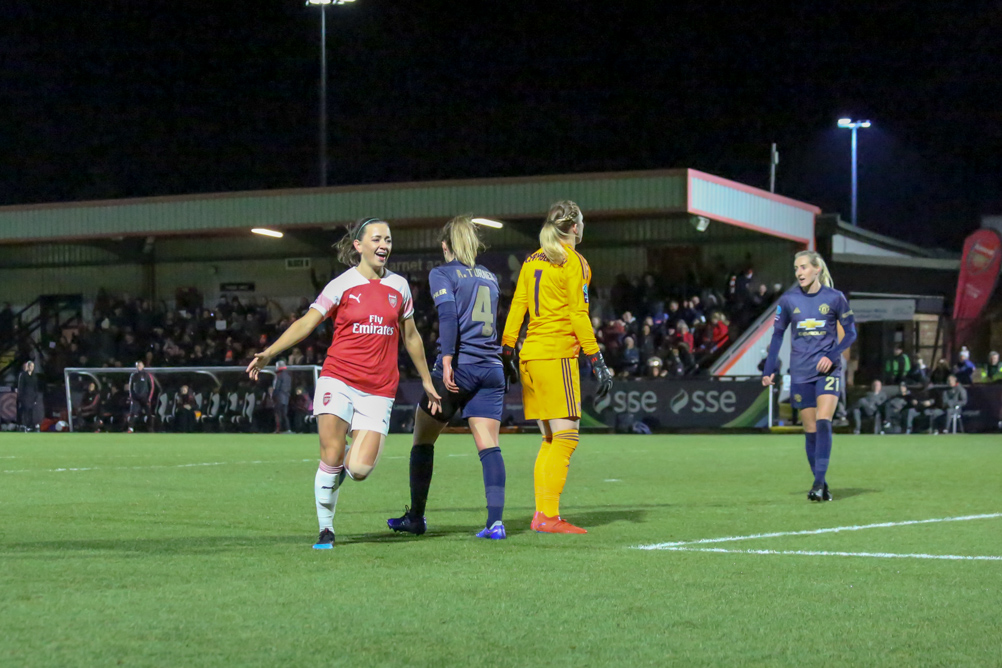
Katie McCabe of Arsenal celebrating after the first goal in their semi-final victory against Manchester United.

Following the previous season's reversion to a group format in the initial stage, the 2018–19 WSL Cup kept the same format but expanded to accommodate the increase in teams in the top two divisions of women's football to 22. As a result, two of the four groups contained six teams while the others remained at five, with only the top two going through to the quarter-finals from each.

== Group stage ==
=== Group One North ===
Pos	Team	Pld	W	WPEN	LPEN	L	GF	GA	GD	Pts	Qualification	MCI	BIR	BRI	SHU	AST	LEI
1	Manchester City	5	4	1	0	0	17	0	+17	14	Advance to knock-out stage	—	—	—	6–0	—	4–0
2	Birmingham City	5	3	0	2	0	10	0	+10	11	Advance to knock-out stage	0–0	—	0–0	—	2–0	—
3	Bristol City	5	2	1	1	1	10	8	+2	9		0–3	—	—	3–1	5–2	—
4	Sheffield United	5	2	0	0	3	6	13	−7	6		—	0–2	—	—	—	3–1
5	Aston Villa	5	1	0	0	4	4	13	−9	3		0–4	—	—	1–2	—	—
6	Leicester City	5	0	1	0	4	3	16	−13	2		—	0–6	2–2	—	0–1	—

Source: thefa.com
Rules for classification: 1) Points; 2) Goal difference; 3) Number of goals scored
18 August 2018
19:00

Aston Villa	1–2	Sheffield United
Hanssen 54'	Report	Cox 40'; Marsden 85'

Trevor Brown Memorial Ground, Boldmere
Attendance: 194
19 August 2018
14:00 BST (UTC+01:00)

Birmingham City	0–0	Manchester City
	Report
Penalties
Mannion (penalty scored); Staniforth (penalty missed); Harrop (penalty scored); Quinn (penalty scored); White (penalty scored); Mayling (penalty missed); Ladd (penalty missed)	4–5	(penalty scored) Parris; (penalty scored) Weir; (penalty scored) Emslie; (penalty scored) Houghton; (penalty missed) McManus; (penalty missed) Walsh; (penalty scored) Beattie

Damson Park, Solihull
Attendance: 572
Referee: Jack Shepherd
19 August 2018

Leicester City	2–2	Bristol City
Johnson 1'; Domingo 77'	Report	Graham 55' (pen.), 86'
Penalties
	4–2

Farley Way Stadium, Quorn
Attendance: 294
Referee: Jamie O’Connor

26 August 2018

Birmingham City	2–0	Aston Villa
Harrop 71'; Wellings	Report

Damson Park, Solihull
Attendance: 638
26 August 2018

Bristol City	3–1	Sheffield United
Graham 26'; Dykes 58'; Woolley 73'	Report	Pennock 12'

Stoke Gifford Stadium, Filton
Referee: Richard Lawrence
26 August 2018

Manchester City	4–0	Leicester City
Wullaert 53', 79'; McCue 71' (o.g.); Nadim 82'

Academy Stadium, Manchester
Attendance: 1,609
Referee: James Bell

16 September 2018

Leicester City	0–1	Aston Villa
	Report	Welsh 19'

Farley Way Stadium, Quorn
Attendance: 312
16 September 2018

Sheffield United	0–2	Birmingham City
	Report	Staniforth 72'; Hayles 84'

Bracken Moor, Stocksbridge
Attendance: 331
Referee: Asaka Matsushita
16 September 2018

Bristol City	0–3	Manchester City
		Emslie 52'; Nadim 65' (pen.); Weir 72'

Stoke Gifford Stadium, Filton
Attendance: 451
Referee: Savvas Yianni

5 December 2018

Manchester City	6–0	Sheffield United
Beckie 8', 25', 49', 79'; Park 14'; Stanway 53' (pen.)

Academy Stadium, Manchester
Referee: Helen Conley
5 December 2018

Bristol City	5–2	Aston Villa
Graham 7', 19'; Kemppi 34', 52'; Robinson 85'	Report	Baptiste 60'; Hanssen 89'

Stoke Gifford Stadium, Filton
Attendance: 218
Referee: Stacey Pearson
5 December 2018

Leicester City	0–6	Birmingham City
	Report	Hayles 3', 60'; Staniforth 22'; Arthur 31'; Wellings 37'; Mannion 73' (pen.)

Farley Way Stadium, Quorn
Attendance: 364
Referee: Abigail Marriott

11 December 2018

Aston Villa	0–4	Manchester City
	Report	Bonner 21'; Beckie 25'; Park 77'; Hemp 84'

Trevor Brown Memorial Ground, Boldmere
Attendance: 458
Referee: Robert Massey Ellis
12 December 2018

Birmingham City	0–0	Bristol City
	Report
Penalties
	1–3

Damson Park, Solihull
Attendance: 363
Referee: Lucy Oliver
12 December 2018

Sheffield United	3–1	Leicester City
Jones 7'; Dixon 8'; Cox 19'	Report	Franklin-Fraiture 33'

Sheffield Olympic Legacy Stadium, Sheffield
Attendance: 234
Referee: Melissa Burgin

=== Group Two North ===
Pos	Team	Pld	W	WPEN	LPEN	L	GF	GA	GD	Pts	Qualification	MNU	REA	EVE	DUR	LIV
1	Manchester United	4	3	0	0	1	5	2	+3	9	Advance to knock-out stage	—	0–2	—	1–0	—
2	Reading	4	2	0	1	1	9	5	+4	7	Advance to knock-out stage	—	—	—	4–1	1–1
3	Everton	4	2	0	0	2	6	7	−1	6		0–3	3–2	—	—	—
4	Durham	4	1	0	1	2	5	8	−3	4		—	—	1–0	—	3–3
5	Liverpool	4	0	2	0	2	5	8	−3	4		0–1	—	1–3	—	—

Source: thefa.com
Rules for classification: 1) Points; 2) Goal difference; 3) Number of goals scored
19 August 2018

Liverpool	0–1	Manchester United
	Report	Arnot 83'

Prenton Park, Birkenhead
Attendance: 829
Referee: Nat Cox
19 August 2018

Reading	4–1	Durham
Pearce 6'; Williams 13', 23', 82'	Report	Hepple 79'

Adams Park, High Wycombe
Attendance: 246
Referee: Alex Rayment

25 August 2018

Manchester United	0–2	Reading
	Report	Chaplen 63'; Davison 90+'

Leigh Sports Village, Leigh
Attendance: 4,835
Referee: Anthony Tankard
26 August 2018

Durham	1–0	Everton
Ness 20'	Report

New Ferens Park, Durham
Attendance: 284
Referee: Lewis Sandoe

16 September 2018

Durham	3–3	Liverpool
Roberts 3', 21'; Cottam 57'	Report	Bradley-Auckland 2'; Babajide 71'; Sweetman-Kirk 86'
Penalties
Hill (penalty scored); Wilson (penalty scored); Hepple (penalty missed); Worthington (penalty scored); Johnson (penalty missed); Atkinson (penalty scored); Christon (penalty missed); Gears (penalty missed)	4 – 5	(penalty missed) Greenwood; (penalty scored) Coombs; (penalty missed) Bonner; (penalty scored) England; (penalty scored) Harding; (penalty scored) Stoney; (penalty missed) Charles; (penalty scored) Weir

New Ferens Park, Durham
Attendance: 352
Referee: Lucy Oliver
16 September 2018

Everton	3–2	Reading
Walker 14', 27'; Kaagman 56'	Report	Finnigan 24' (o.g.); Chaplen 79'

Haig Avenue, Southport
Attendance: 143
Referee: Rebecca Welch

5 December 2018

Manchester United	1–0	Durham
Green 1'	Report

Leigh Sports Village, Leigh
Attendance: 686
Referee: Samuel Barrott

12 December 2018

Reading	1–1	Liverpool
Furness 64'	Report	Sweetman-Kirk 66'
Penalties
Allen (penalty missed)	4–5	Bradley-Auckland (penalty scored)

Adams Park, High Wycombe
Attendance: 323
Referee: Lisa Benn
13 December 2018

Everton	0–3	Manchester United
	Report	James 12'; Galton 17'; Zelem 37'

Haig Avenue, Southport
Attendance: 267
Referee: Rebecca Walsh
16 December 2018

Liverpool	1–3	Everton
Fahey 14'	Report	Boye-Hlorkah 2'; Magill 10'; Hughes

Prenton Park, Birkenhead
Attendance: 207
Referee: Jon Kenny

=== Group One South ===
Pos	Team	Pld	W	WPEN	LPEN	L	GF	GA	GD	Pts	Qualification	CHE	BHA	CRY	TOT	LON	YEO
1	Chelsea	5	5	0	0	0	25	2	+23	15	Advance to knock-out stage	—	3–1	—	—	—	7–0
2	Brighton & Hove Albion	5	3	0	1	1	15	8	+7	10	Advance to knock-out stage	—	—	5–1	—	3–1	—
3	Crystal Palace	5	2	1	0	2	10	12	−2	8		0–4	—	—	1–1	7–2	—
4	Tottenham Hotspur	5	1	1	1	2	9	12	−3	6		0–5	2–2	—	—	—	—
5	London Bees	5	1	1	0	3	9	19	−10	5		1–6	—	—	4–2	—	1–1
6	Yeovil Town	5	0	0	1	4	2	17	−15	1		—	1–4	0–1	0–4	—	—

Source: thefa.com
Rules for classification: 1) Points; 2) Goal difference; 3) Number of goals scored
19 August 2018

Chelsea	3–1	Brighton & Hove Albion
Spence 45'; Kirby 68'; England 87'	Report	Whelan 77'

Kingsmeadow, Kingston Upon Thames
Attendance: 1,095
Referee: Jack Packman
19 August 2018

Crystal Palace	1–1	Tottenham Hotspur
Balfour 64'	Report	Green 37'
Penalties
	5–4

Hayes Lane, Bromley
Attendance: 372
Referee: James Simpson
19 August 2018

London Bees	1–1	Yeovil Town
Wilson 29'	Report	Fergusson 40'
Penalties
	5–3

The Hive Stadium, Canons Park
Attendance: 246
Referee: Ian Stewart

26 August 2018

Tottenham Hotspur	2–2	Brighton & Hove Albion
Dean 7'; Wynne 35'	Report	Williams 51'; Umotong 90+1'
Penalties
	10–9

Theobalds Lane, Cheshunt
Attendance: 144
Referee: Andreas Anastasiou
26 August 2018

London Bees	1–6	Chelsea
Pickett 40'	Report	Bachmann 7', 45'; Spence 9', 36'; Kirby 79'; England 81'

The Hive Stadium, Canons Park
Attendance: 374
Referee: Neil Morrison
26 August 2018

Yeovil Town	0–1	Crystal Palace
	Report	Butler 82'

The Avenue Stadium, Dorchester
Attendance: 301
Referee: Scott Robertson

16 September 2018

Brighton & Hove Albion	3–1	London Bees
Umotong 27'; Brazil 36'; Whelan 88'	Report	Howells 22'

Broadfield Stadium, Crawley
Attendance: 171
Referee: Stacey Pearson
16 September 2018

Crystal Palace	0–4	Chelsea
	Report	Engman 10'; England 56', 64'; Spence 59'

Hayes Lane, Bromley
Attendance: 476
Referee: David Spain
16 September 2018

Yeovil Town	0–4	Tottenham Hotspur
	Report	Wiltshire 7'; Haines 22', 39', 61'

The Avenue Stadium, Dorchester
Attendance: 415
Referee: Matthew Russell

5 December 2018
19:30 GMT

Chelsea	7–0	Yeovil Town
Engman 2', 77'; Spence 17', 63'; England 24'; Cousins 37' (o.g.); Cuthbert 75'	Report

Kingsmeadow, Kingston Upon Thames
Attendance: 916
Referee: Lisa Benn
5 December 2018

Brighton & Hove Albion	5–1	Crystal Palace
Perry 14'; Natkiel 38', 64'; Brett 40'; Gibbons 72'	Report	Burr 85'

Broadfield Stadium, Crawley
Attendance: 204
Referee: Alex Blake
5 December 2018

London Bees	4–2	Tottenham Hotspur
Davy 45', 46'; Wilkinson 60'; Forman 84'	Report	Dean 5'; Wiltshire 40'

The Hive Stadium, Canons Park
Attendance: 146
Referee: Michael Begley

12 December 2018

Tottenham Hotspur	0–5	Chelsea
		Cooper 10'; Riley 18'; Carney 46'; England 60', 72'

Theobalds Lane, Cheshunt
Attendance: 358
Referee: Abigail Marriott
12 December 2018

Yeovil Town	1–4	Brighton & Hove Albion
Syme 37'	Report	Brazil 15'; Buet 45+2'; Green 53'; Roe 83'

The Avenue Stadium, Dorchester
Attendance: 224
Referee: James Robinson
13 December 2018

Crystal Palace	7–2	London Bees
Hincks 12', 24', 45+2' (pen.), 67'; Burr 52', 70'; True 76'	Report	Pickett 15'; Davy 21'

Hayes Lane, Bromley
Attendance: 146
Referee: Chris Myers

=== Group Two South ===
Pos	Team	Pld	W	WPEN	LPEN	L	GF	GA	GD	Pts	Qualification	ARS	WHU	LEW	CHA	MIL
1	Arsenal	4	4	0	0	0	20	2	+18	12	Advance to knock-out stage	—	3–1	—	5–0	—
2	West Ham United	4	3	0	0	1	11	4	+7	9	Advance to knock-out stage	—	—	4–1	—	4–0
3	Lewes	4	2	0	0	2	8	13	−5	6		0–9	—	—	5–0	—
4	Charlton Athletic	4	1	0	0	3	4	14	−10	3		—	0–2	—	—	4–2
5	Millwall Lionesses	4	0	0	0	4	3	13	−10	0		1–3	—	0–2	—	—

Source: thefa.com
Rules for classification: 1) Points; 2) Goal difference; 3) Number of goals scored
19 August 2018

Arsenal	3–1	West Ham United
McCabe 12', 80'; Mead 44'	Report	Visalli 48'

Meadow Park, Borehamwood
Attendance: 834
Referee: Stephen Bates

Lewes	5–0	Charlton Athletic
Bergin 11' (pen.), 43'; Lane 22'; Carter 86', 90+1'	Report

The Dripping Pan, Lewes
Attendance: 205
Referee: Jamie Wells

26 August 2018

Charlton Athletic	4–2	Millwall Lionesses
Graham 11', 48'; Bailes 60'; Bryan 83'	Report	Ravenscroft 39'; Clarke 45'

The Oakwood, Crayford
Attendance: 204
Referee: Isaac Hearle
26 August 2018

West Ham United	4–1	Lewes
Ross 25', 49' (pen.); Kiernan 29'; Simic 32'	Report	Lane 8'

Rush Green Stadium, Romford
Attendance: 255
Referee: Jamie Pope

16 September 2018

Lewes	0–9	Arsenal
	Report	van de Donk 7'; Miedema 21', 47', 62'; McCabe 26'; Little 37' (pen.), 45' (pen.), 68'; Evans 59'

The Dripping Pan, Lewes
Attendance: 945
Referee: Alex Blake
16 September 2018

West Ham United	4–0	Millwall Lionesses
de Graaf 6', 86'; Visalli 9'; Kmita 12'	Report

Rush Green Stadium, Romford
Attendance: 557
Referee: Tom Bishop

5 December 2018

Millwall Lionesses	0–2	Lewes
	Report	Carter 68'; Quayle 78'

Princes Park, Dartford
Attendance: 143
Referee: Kirsty Dowle
6 December 2018

Arsenal	5–0	Charlton Athletic
Miedema 6', 76'; McCabe 30', 81'; Ritchie 59' (o.g.)	Report

Meadow Park, Borehamwood
Referee: Lee Brennan

12 December 2018

Millwall Lionesses	1–3	Arsenal
Ravenscroft 32'	Report	Miedema 55'; Grant 56'; Williamson 60'

Princes Park, Dartford
Attendance: 463
Referee: Dean Skipper
12 December 2018

Charlton Athletic	0–2	West Ham United
	Report	Kmita 46'; Lehmann 56'

The Oakwood, Crayford
Attendance: 202
Referee: Gerry Heron

== Knock-out stage ==
Quarter-finals
Arsenal	2
Birmingham City	1
Manchester United	2
West Ham United	0
Chelsea	4
Reading	0
Manchester City	7
Brighton & Hove Albion	1

Semi-finals
Arsenal	2
Manchester United	1
Chelsea	0
Manchester City	2

Final
Arsenal	0 (2)
Manchester City (pen.)	0 (4)

=== Quarter-finals ===
The draw for this round was made on 18 December 2018.

9 January 2019
19:00 GMT (UTC+00:00)

Manchester United	2–0	West Ham United
Sigsworth 17', 53'	Report Report

Leigh Sports Village, Leigh
Attendance: 1,029

9 January 2019
19:30 GMT (UTC+00:00)

Arsenal	2–1	Birmingham City
van de Donk 83'; Miedema 90+1'	Report Report	Quinn 61'

Meadow Park, Borehamwood

9 January 2019
19:30 GMT (UTC+00:00)

Chelsea	4–0	Reading
Kirby 3', 86'; Asante 37'; Riley 90+1'	Report Report

Kingsmeadow, Kingston upon Thames
Attendance: 973

10 January 2019
19:00 GMT (UTC+00:00)

Manchester City	7–1	Brighton & Hove Albion
Nikita Parris 6'; Hemp 23', 86'; Weir 59'; Emslie 88'; Stanway 90'; Beckie 90+2'	Report Report	Buet 9'

Academy Stadium, Manchester
Attendance: 786

=== Semi-finals ===
The draw for the semi-finals was made on 12 January 2019.

6 February 2019
19:30 GMT (UTC+00:00)

Chelsea	0–2	Manchester City
	Report	Parris 49', 81'

Kingsmeadow, Kingston upon Thames
Attendance: 1,358
Referee: David Rock

7 February 2019
19:30 GMT (UTC+00:00)

Arsenal	2–1	Manchester United
Miedema 18', 60'	Report	Green 83'

Meadow Park, Borehamwood
Attendance: 1,836
Referee: Amy Fearn

=== Final ===
23 February 2019
12:15 GMT (UTC+00:00)

Arsenal	0–0 (a.e.t.)	Manchester City
	Report
Penalties
Little (penalty scored); Williamson (penalty missed); Van de Donk (penalty missed); Bloodworth (penalty scored)	2–4	(penalty scored) Stanway; (penalty missed) Hemp; (penalty scored) Emslie; (penalty scored) Houghton; (penalty scored) Beckie

Bramall Lane, Sheffield
Attendance: 2,424
Referee: Lucy Oliver

== See also ==
- 2018–19 FA WSL
- 2018–19 FA Women's Championship
