= 2018–19 FA WSL =

Eighth season of the top English women's association football league

FA WSL
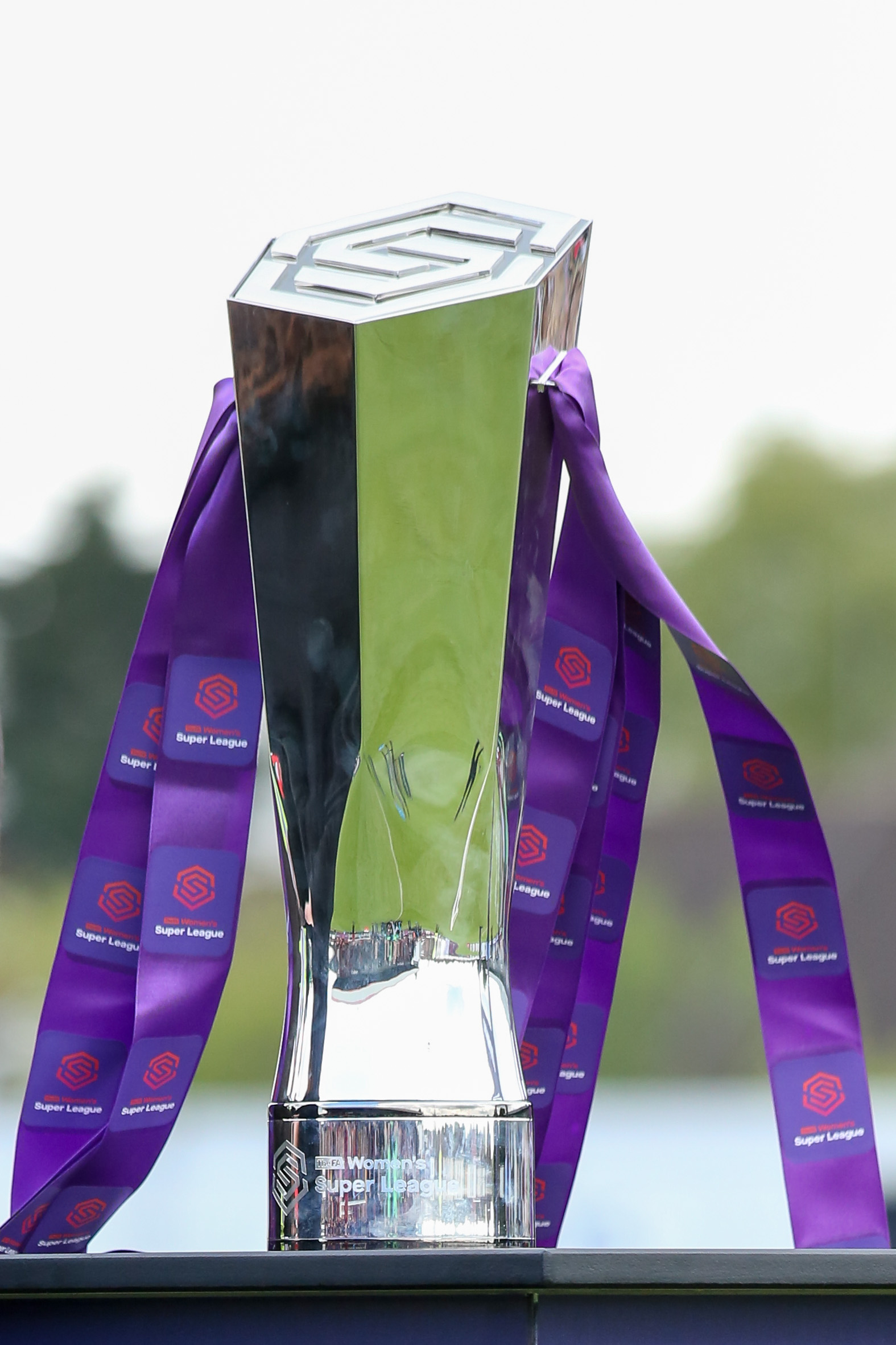
- FA WSL trophy
- Season: 2018–19
- Champions: Arsenal; 3rd WSL title 15th English title
- Relegated: Yeovil Town
- Champions League: Arsenal; Manchester City
- Matches: 110
- Goals: 336 (3.05 per match)
- Top goalscorer: Vivianne Miedema (22 goals)
- Biggest home win: Manchester City 7–1 West Ham United (14 October 2018); Arsenal 6–0 Reading (21 October 2018); Chelsea 6–0 Bristol City (20 February 2019)
- Biggest away win: Yeovil Town 0–8 Chelsea (7 May 2019)
- Highest scoring: Manchester City 7–1 West Ham United (14 October 2018); Yeovil Town 0–8 Chelsea (7 May 2019)
- Average attendance: 1,010

The 2018–19 FA WSL was the eighth edition of the FA Women's Super League (WSL) since it was formed in 2010. It was the first season after a rebranding of the four highest levels in English women's football. The previous FA WSL 2 became the Championship – eleven clubs competed in the 2018–19 FA Women's Championship.

Arsenal won their first WSL since 2012 with a 4–0 victory over Brighton & Hove Albion.

== Teams ==
Following restructuring of the women's game in order to provide for a fully professional Women's Super League (WSL), membership of both the first and second tier is subject to a licence, based on a series of off-the-field criteria. Yeovil Town estimated the budget needed for a WSL season at about £350,000. Existing WSL teams were first offered the opportunity to bid for licences, with all applying FA WSL clubs retaining their place in the first tier, with Brighton & Hove Albion from the WSL2 also offered a place in the WSL. From the first tier, Sunderland were unsuccessful in their license application.

This left up to two places in the WSL and up to five places in the Championship for applying clubs. Fifteen applications were received for both the top two tiers, and West Ham were given a licence in the second stage, so that the league is made up of 11 teams.

Locations of the 2018–19 WSL 1 teams

Team	Location	Ground	Capacity	2017–18 season
Arsenal	Borehamwood	Meadow Park	4,502	3rd
Birmingham City	Solihull	Damson Park	3,050	5th
Brighton & Hove Albion	Crawley	Broadfield Stadium	6,134	2nd, WSL 2
Bristol City	Filton	Stoke Gifford Stadium	1,500	8th
Chelsea	Kingston upon Thames	Kingsmeadow	4,850	1st
Everton	Southport	Haig Avenue	6,008	9th
Liverpool	Birkenhead	Prenton Park	16,587	6th
Manchester City	Manchester	Academy Stadium	7,000	2nd
Reading	High Wycombe	Adams Park	9,617	4th
West Ham United	Romford	Rush Green Training Ground	3,000	7th, WPL South
Yeovil Town	Dorchester	The Avenue Stadium	5,229	10th

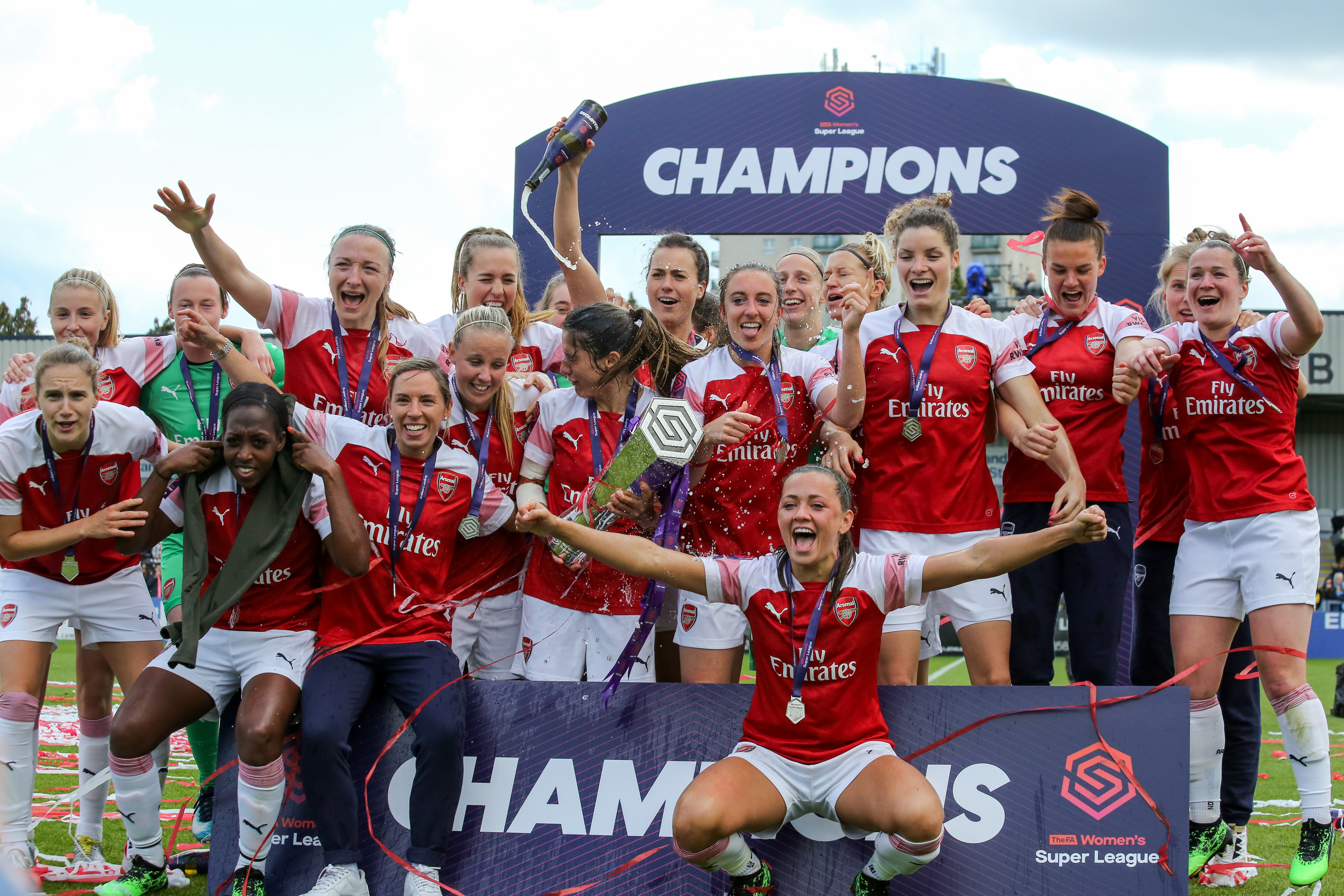
Arsenal celebrates winning the 2018–19 FA WSL season.

=== Managerial changes ===
Team	Outgoing manager	Manner of departure	Date of vacancy	Position in table	Incoming manager	Date of appointment
Bristol City	(Scotland) Willie Kirk	Signed with Manchester United	29 May 2018	End of season (8th)	(Australia) Tanya Oxtoby	4 July 2018
West Ham United	(England) Karen Ray	End of interim period	7 June 2018	Pre-season	(England) Matt Beard	7 June 2018
Liverpool	(England) Scott Rodgers	Sacked	8 June 2018	Pre-season	(England) Neil Redfearn	12 June 2018
Yeovil Town	(England) Jamie Sherwood	Appointed Director of Football	14 June 2018	Pre-season	(England) Lee Burch	14 June 2018
Liverpool	(England) Neil Redfearn	Resigned	14 September 2018	11th	(England) Vicky Jepson	26 October 2018
Everton	(England) Andy Spence	Sacked	7 November 2018	11th	(Scotland) Willie Kirk	1 December 2018
Birmingham City	(England) Marc Skinner	Signed with Orlando Pride	11 January 2019	4th	(Spain) Marta Tejedor	21 January 2019

== League table ==
Pos	Team	Pld	W	D	L	GF	GA	GD	Pts	Qualification
1	Arsenal (C)	20	18	0	2	70	13	+57	54	Qualification for the Champions League knockout phase
2	Manchester City	20	14	5	1	53	17	+36	47	Qualification for the Champions League knockout phase
3	Chelsea	20	12	6	2	46	14	+32	42	
4	Birmingham City	20	13	1	6	29	17	+12	40	
5	Reading	20	8	3	9	33	30	+3	27	
6	Bristol City	20	7	4	9	17	34	−17	25	
7	West Ham United	20	7	2	11	25	37	−12	23	
8	Liverpool	20	7	1	12	21	38	−17	22	
9	Brighton & Hove Albion	20	4	4	12	16	38	−22	16	
10	Everton	20	3	3	14	15	38	−23	12	
11	Yeovil Town (R)	20	2	1	17	11	60	−49	−3 (Note: Yeovil Town deducted 10 points for entering administration.)	Relegation to the Championship

Source: FA WSL
Rules for classification: 1) Points; 2) Goal difference; 3) Number of goals scored
(C) Champions; (R) Relegated

== Results ==
Home \ Away	ARS	BIR	BRH	BRI	CHE	EVE	LIV	MCI	REA	WHU	YEO
Arsenal	—	3–1	4–1	4–0	1–2	2–1	5–0	1–0	6–0	4–3	3–0
Birmingham City	0–1	—	1–0	0–1	0–0	1–0	2–0	2–3	2–1	3–0	2–1
Brighton & Hove Albion	0–4	2–1	—	0–1	0–4	0–0	0–1	0–6	1–4	0–1	2–1
Bristol City	0–4	0–1	0–0	—	0–0	1–0	2–1	1–1	0–1	1–2	2–1
Chelsea	0–5	2–3	2–0	6–0	—	3–0	1–0	0–0	1–0	1–1	5–0
Everton	0–4	1–3	3–3	0–2	0–0	—	2–1	0–4	3–2	1–2	0–1
Liverpool	1–5	0–2	0–2	5–2	0–4	3–1	—	0–3	0–1	1–0	2–1
Manchester City	2–0	1–0	3–0	2–2	2–2	3–1	2–1	—	1–1	7–1	2–1
Reading	0–3	0–1	1–0	3–0	2–3	2–1	2–2	3–4	—	1–2	4–0
West Ham United	2–4	1–2	0–4	2–0	0–2	0–1	0–1	1–3	0–0	—	2–1
Yeovil Town	0–7	0–2	1–1	1–2	0–8	1–0	1–2	0–4	0–5	0–5	—

Updated to match(es) played on 11 May 2019. Source: FA WSL
Legend: Blue = home team win; Yellow = draw; Red = away team win.

== Position by round ==
Team ╲ Round	1	2	3	4	5	6	7	8	9	10	11	12	13	14	15	16	17	18	19	20	21	22
Arsenal	1	1	1	1	1	1	1	1	1	1	1	1	1	2	2	2	2	2	1	1	1	1
Birmingham City	3	2	2	2	2	3	3	3	4	3	3	4	4	4	4	4	4	4	4	4	3	4
Brighton & Hove Albion	9	8	10	10	10	10	9	9	9	9	10	10	9	9	9	9	9	9	9	9	9	9
Bristol City	4	5	4	6	7	5	6	7	6	6	7	7	7	5	5	5	5	5	5	6	6	6
Chelsea	5	6	6	5	5	6	4	4	3	5	4	3	3	3	3	3	3	3	3	3	4	3
Everton	10	9	9	9	9	9	10	11	11	11	9	9	10	10	10	10	10	10	10	10	10	10
Liverpool	7	10	7	8	6	4	5	6	7	8	8	8	8	8	8	8	8	8	8	8	8	8
Manchester City	6	3	3	3	3	2	2	2	2	2	2	2	2	1	1	1	1	1	2	2	2	2
Reading	2	4	5	4	4	7	5	5	5	4	5	5	5	6	6	6	7	7	6	5	5	5
West Ham United	11	7	8	7	8	8	8	8	8	7	6	6	6	7	7	7	6	6	7	7	7	7
Yeovil Town	8	11	11	11	11	11	11	10	10	10	11	11	11	11	11	11	11	11	11	11	11	11

Qualification to Champions League
Relegation to Championship

Updated to match(es) played on 11 May 2019. Source: FA WSL

== Season statistics ==
=== Top scorers ===
Top scorers
Rank	Player	Club	Goals
1	(Netherlands) Vivianne Miedema	Arsenal	22
2	(England) Nikita Parris	Manchester City	19
3	Bethany England	Chelsea	12
3	(England) Fara Williams	Reading	12
5	(England) Georgia Stanway	Manchester City	11
5	(Netherlands) Daniëlle van de Donk	Arsenal	11
7	(England) Courtney Sweetman-Kirk	Liverpool	10
8	(England) Fran Kirby	Chelsea	9
8	(England) Jordan Nobbs	Arsenal	9
10	(Scotland) Erin Cuthbert	Chelsea	8
10	(Scotland) Kim Little	Arsenal	8

== Awards ==
=== Monthly awards ===
Awards by month
Month	Manager of the Month		Player of the Month		Ref
Month	Manager	Club	Player	Club	Ref
September	(Australia) Tanya Oxtoby	Bristol City	(England) Sophie Baggaley	Bristol City	
October	(Australia) Joe Montemurro	Arsenal	(Netherlands) Vivianne Miedema	Arsenal	
November	(England) Kelly Chambers	Reading	(England) Courtney Sweetman-Kirk	Liverpool	
December	(England) Nick Cushing	Manchester City	(England) Georgia Stanway	Manchester City	
January	(Australia) Tanya Oxtoby	Bristol City	(Scotland) Erin Cuthbert	Chelsea	
February	(England) Hope Powell	Brighton & Hove Albion	(England) Sophie Harris	Brighton & Hove Albion	
March	(Australia) Joe Montemurro	Arsenal	(England) Beth Mead	Arsenal	
April	(Spain) Marta Tejedor	Birmingham City	(England) Beth Mead	Arsenal	

=== Annual awards ===
Awards
Award	Winner	Club
FA WFA Players' Player of the Year	(England) Sophie Baggaley	Bristol City
FA WFA Goal of the Year	(England) Beth Mead	Arsenal
FA WFA Save of the Year	(England) Megan Walsh	Yeovil Town
LMA Manager of the Year	(Australia) Joe Montemurro	Arsenal
PFA Players' Player of the Year	(Netherlands) Vivianne Miedema	Arsenal
PFA Young Player of the Year	(England) Georgia Stanway	Manchester City
PFA Merit Award	(England) Steph Houghton	Manchester City
FWA Footballer of the Year	(England) Nikita Parris	Manchester City

PFA Team of the Year
Goalkeeper	(England) Sophie Baggaley (Bristol City)			
Defence	(England) Hannah Blundell (Chelsea)	(England) Aoife Mannion (Birmingham City)	(England) Steph Houghton (Manchester City)	(England) Demi Stokes (Manchester City)
Midfield	(South Korea) Ji So-Yun (Chelsea)		(Scotland) Kim Little (Arsenal)	(Switzerland) Lia Wälti (Arsenal)
Attack	(Netherlands) Vivianne Miedema (Arsenal)		(Scotland) Erin Cuthbert (Chelsea)	(England) Nikita Parris (Manchester City)

== See also ==
- 2018–19 FA WSL Cup
- 2018–19 FA Women's Championship (tier 2)
- 2018–19 FA Women's National League (tier 3 & 4)
