= 2016–17 FC Bayern Munich (women) season =

2016–17 season
- Chairman: Karl-Heinz Rummenigge
- Manager: Thomas Wörle
- Stadium: Grünwalder Stadion
- Bundesliga: 2nd
- DFB-Pokal: Quarter-finals
- Champions League: Quarter-finals
- Top goalscorer: League: Vivianne Miedema (14); All: Vivianne Miedema (26)
Home colours	Away colours	Third colours

The 2016–17 season was the 27th edition of Bayern Munich's women's section since the creation of the Frauen Bundesliga. In it the team tried to defend its second consecutive Frauen Bundesliga title and made its third appearance in the UEFA Women's Champions League.

== Summary ==
Bayern had successfully defended its first Bundesliga title and won the 2015–16 championship too with a 10 points advantage over Wolfsburg – the largest gap between the league's champion and runner-up since the 2001–02 edition. On the other hand, in its return to the UEFA Women's Champions League, where Wolfsburg lost the final on penalties against Olympique Lyonnais, Bayern failed to progress to the later stages and was knocked out by Twente on away goals in the Round of 32. In the DFB-Pokal the team reached the semifinals, where it was eliminated by the sensation of the competition, Sand.

The day after the DFB-Pokal elimination, Bayern announced its first signing for the 2016–17 season, international Verena Faißt from Wolfsburg. Before the end of the Bundesliga another experienced German international was signed, Frankfurt's Simone Laudehr, while Eunice Beckmann left the club for NWSL's Boston Breakers.

Few days after the final Bundesliga game against Hoffenheim Bayern signed midfielder Anna Gerhardt coming from Köln, which had just been relegated. She has followed one month later by Dutch defender Stefanie van der Gragt from Twente and Jacintha Weimar, who replaced Fabienne Weber as Bayern's third goalkeeper. On the other hand, Paris St.-Germain signed Spanish midfielder Vero Boquete, and Laura Feiersinger and Raffaella Manieri, who had played few games in the 2015–16 season, signed for Sand and Brescia respectively.

Bayern failed to win its two first Bundesliga home games, tying 1–1 against Freiburg and losing 1–2 against title contender Wolfsburg. However, the team won all away games in the Bundesliga up to March, chaining six victories until they lost 1–2 against Turbine Potsdam, back to the top positions after a disappointing 2015–16 season, on December 11. Meanwhile, Bayern had easily knocked out the Scottish and Russian runners-up Hibernian and Rossiyanka by wide aggregates (10–1 and 8–0 respectively) in the Champions League and reached the quarterfinals for the first time. Lastly it progressed easily past lower-division teams 1. FC Riegelsberg (0–15) and Arminia Ibbenbüren (0–8) in the DFB-Pokal.

In November, following the end of the 2016 Damallsvenskan, signed Fridolina Rolfö from champion Linköping. One month later Claire Falknor, having played no Bundesliga games in the first half of the season, departed to the NWSL.

On January 9 Melanie Behringer was nominated in the successor of the FIFA Women's World Player, The Best Awards. Bayern was the only team with more than one player in the top 5 positions, as Sara Däbritz ranked fifth. Meanwhile, the team held a training stage in Andalusia during the winter interseason, in which they defeated Arsenal 3–1 in a charitable friendly played in Betis' home ground.

Back into official action, Bayern defeated Freiburg and Jena before facing two crucial games against Wolfsburg in March. They lost both by 0–2 as Wolfsburg knocked them out of the DFB Pokal in the quarterfinals and set course for the title. Next they faced the Champions League's quarterfinals against 2014–15 runner-up Paris St.-Germain. Bayern won the first leg by 1–0 but suffered a 4–0 defeat in the Parc des Princes. Thus the team ended March out of the Champions League and the Pokal and with few options of winning the Bundesliga.

From April Bayern won the next three Bundesliga games before losing 4–2 against Frankfurt. On May 11 it defeated Borussia Mönchengladbach but lost all mathematical options to win the championship with Wolfsburg's 2–1 victory over Essen. Bayern now faced a head-to-head match for the other Champions League spot against Turbine Potsdam. They won it with a remarkable 0–4 scoreline, and sealed their qualification in the last game by defeating Essen by 2–0.

== Transfers ==
Transfers in Transfers out

Transfers
Date	Pos.	Player	Origin / Destination	Notes	References
	GK	(Germany) Fabienne Weber	(Germany) SV Jungingen		
2016–04–04	DF	(Germany) Verena Faisst	(Germany) VfL Wolfsburg		Sport1
2016–05–05	FW	(Germany) Eunice Beckmann	(United States) Boston Breakers		Sport1
2016–05–05	MF	(Germany) Simone Laudehr	(Germany) 1. FFC Frankfurt		Welt
2016–05–20	MF	(Austria) Laura Feiersinger	(Germany) SC Sand		Zeit
2016–05–20	MF	(Germany) Anna Gerhardt	(Germany) 1. FC Köln		Kicker
2016–06–15	DF	(Netherlands) Stefanie van der Gragt	(Netherlands) Twente		RTV Oost
2016–06–15	GK	(Netherlands) Jacintha Weimar	(Netherlands) CTO Eindhoven		VI
2016–07–??	MF	(Germany) Ricarda Walkling	(United States) N.C. State Wolfpack		
2016–07–07	DF	(Italy) Raffaella Manieri	(Italy) Brescia		Giornale di Brescia
2016–07–08	MF	(Spain) Vero Boquete	(France) Paris Saint-Germain		Marca
2016–11–22	FW	(Sweden) Fridolina Rolfö	(Sweden) Linköping		Expressen
2016–12–20	DF	(United States) Claire Falknor	(United States) Houston Dash		Equalizer Soccer

== Results ==
Win Draw Loss Postponed
Numbers in brackets in league games show the team's position in the table following the match

=== Preseason and interseason ===
23 July 2016 Friendly	St. Pölten (Austria)	0–5	(Germany) Bayern Munich
		Report	Faißt 21'; Iwabuchi 45'; Miedema 57'; Lewandowski 72'; Pekel 88'

30 July 2016 Friendly	Bayern Munich (Germany)	4–0	(Switzerland) Zürich	FC Hawangen, Hawangen
	Holstad Berge 3'; Gerhardt 40'; Rolser 78'; Guttenberger 87'	Report

1 February 2017 Friendly	Arsenal (England)	1–3	(Germany) Bayern Munich	Luis del Sol, Sevilla
	Carter 63'	Report	Miedema 18'; Bürki 81', 88'

11 February 2017 Friendly	Bayern Munich (Germany)	3–0	(Czech Republic) Slavia Prague	Sportpark, Aschheim
	Rolser; Evans; Miedema	Report

=== UEFA Women's Champions League ===
5 October 2016 Round of 32 – 1	Hibernian (Scotland)	0–6	(Germany) Bayern Munich	Easter Road, Edinburgh
20:30		Report	van der Gragt 6'; Miedema 26', 57'; Leupolz 38', 63'; Behringer 67' (pen.)	Attendance: 2,551; Referee: (Switzerland) Staubli

12 October 2016 Round of 32 – 2	Bayern Munich (Germany)	4–1	(Scotland) Hibernian	Grünwalder, Munich
18:00	Gerhardt 6', 38'; Evans 33'; Miedema 72'	Report	Harrison 39'	Attendance: 320; Referee: (Norway) Sørø

9 November 2016 Round of 16 – 1	Bayern Munich (Germany)	4–0	(Russia) Rossiyanka	Grünwalder, Munich
18:00	Evans 41'; Rolser 45+2'; Miedema 52', 75'	Report		Attendance: 410; Referee: (Portugal) Braz Bastos

17 November 2016 Round of 16 – 2	Rossiyanka (Russia)	0–4	(Germany) Bayern Munich	Rodina, Khimki
17:00		Report	Miedema 42', 52'; Däbritz 72'; Holstad Berge 90+2'	Attendance: 500; Referee: (France) Frappart

23 March 2017 Quarterfinals – 1	Bayern Munich (Germany)	1–0	(France) Paris St. Germain	Grünwalder, Munich
19:00	Miedema 72'	Report		Attendance: 7,300; Referee: (Sweden) Larsson

29 March 2017 Quarterfinals – 2	Paris St.-Germain (France)	4–0	(Germany) Bayern Munich	Parc des Princes, Paris
20:00	Delie 4'; Cristiane 12', 51'; Cruz 42'	Report		Attendance: 12,000; Referee: (Italy) Vitulano

=== Frauen Bundesliga ===
3 September 2016 1	Bayern Munich	1–1	SC Freiburg	Grünwalder, Munich
16:00	Behringer 50' (pen.)	Report	Kayikçi 79'	Attendance: 1,022; Referee: Hussein

10 September 2016 2	USV Jena	0–1	Bayern Munich	Ernst Abbe, Jena
14:00		Report	Miedema 69'	Attendance: 753; Referee: Baitinger

25 September 2016 3	Bayern Munich	1–2	VfL Wolfsburg	Grünwalder, Munich
14:00	Miedema 69'	Report	Dickenmann 32'; Popp 76'	Attendance: 1,480; Referee: Rafalski

2 October 2016 4	Bayer Leverkusen	0–1	Bayern Munich	BayArena, Leverkusen
14:00		Report	Lewandowski 22'	Attendance: 843; Referee: Müller-Schmäh

16 October 2016 5	SC Sand	0–1	Bayern Munich	Orsay, Willstätt
11:00		Report	Laudehr 43'	Attendance: 1,783; Referee: Heimann

29 October 2016 6	Bayern Munich	3–1	MSV Duisburg	Grünwalder, Munich
14:00	Miedema 43'; Lewandowski 69'; Behringer 86'	Report	Hess 51'	Attendance: 472; Referee: Lohmeyer

5 November 2016 7	1899 Hoffenheim	0–1	Bayern Munich	Dietmar Hopp, Sinsheim
13:00		Report	Miedema 25'	Attendance: 1,650; Referee: Wacker

13 November 2016 8	Bayern Munich	1–0	1. FFC Frankfurt	Grünwalder, Munich
13:00	Rolser 27'	Report		Attendance: 610; Referee: Appelmann

20 November 2016 9	Bayern Munich	1–0	Borussia Mönchengladbach	Grünwalder, Munich
14:00	Miedema 8'	Report		Attendance: 452; Referee: Wozniak

11 December 2016 10	Bayern Munich	1–2	Turbine Potsdam	Grünwalder, Munich
13:00	Elsig 62' (o.g.)	Report	Elsig 48'; Holstad Berge 58'	Attendance: 1,410; Referee: Wacker

18 December 2016 11	SGS Essen	0–3	Bayern Munich	Stadion, Essen
13:00		Report	Rolser 23'; Wenninger 64'; Baunach 90+4'	Attendance: 2,346; Referee: Kunkel

18 February 2017 12	SC Freiburg	2–3	Bayern Munich	Möslestadion, Freiburg
12:00	Simon 32'; Petermann 63'	Report	Behringer 5'; Miedema 50'; Holstad Berge 69'	Attendance: 1,227; Referee: Appelmann

26 February 2017 13	Bayern Munich	2–1	USV Jena	Grünwalder, Munich
14:00	Miedema 65', 70'	Report	Zinsberger 38' (o.g.)	Attendance: 542; Referee: Kunkel

19 March 2017 14	VfL Wolfsburg	2–0	Bayern Munich	AOK, Wolfsburg
17:00	Harder 14'; Kerschowski 83'	Report		Attendance: 2,640; Referee: Rafalski

26 March 2017 15	Bayern Munich	1–0	Bayer Leverkusen	Grünwalder, Munich
14:00	Lotzen 9'	Report		Attendance: 382; Referee: Weigelt

2 April 2017 16	Bayern Munich	1–0	SC Sand	Grünwalder, Munich
17:00	Abbé 81'	Report		Attendance: 460; Referee: Hussein

23 April 2017 17	MSV Duisburg	0–1	Bayern Munich	PCC, Homberg
14:00		Report	Behringer 80' (pen.)	Attendance: 2,640; Referee: Wacker

1 May 2017 18	Bayern Munich	2–0	1899 Hoffenheim	Grünwalder, Munich
13:30	Miedema 5', 43'	Report		Attendance: 522; Referee: Appelmann

7 May 2017 19	1. FFC Frankfurt	4–2	Bayern Munich	Brentanobad, Frankfurt am Main
11:00	Islacker 17' (pen.), 71'; Groenen 20'; Hechler 80'	Report	Abbé 42'; Wenninger 60'	Attendance: 2,120; Referee: Heimann

10 May 2017 20	Borussia Mönchengladbach	0–3	Bayern Munich	Grenzlandstadion, Mönchengladbach
20:00		Report	Bürki 15'; Gerhardt 62'; Miedema 63'	Attendance: 305; Referee: Diekmann

14 May 2017 21	Turbine Potsdam	0–4	Bayern Munich	Karl Liebknecht, Potsdam
14:00		Report	Behringer 2'; Däbritz 35'; Rolser 44'; Miedema 80'	Attendance: 3,421; Referee: Wozniak

21 May 2017 22	Bayern Munich	2–0	SGS Essen	Grünwalder, Munich
14:00	Miedema 85', 90'	Report		Attendance: 960; Referee: Wacker

Final standings
Pos	Team	Pld	W	D	L	GF	GA	GD	Pts	Notes
1	VfL Wolsburg	22	17	3	2	56	14	+42	54	Qualified for next season's Champions League
2	Bayern Munich	22	17	1	4	36	15	+21	52	Qualified for next season's Champions League
3	Turbine Potsdam	22	16	2	4	42	16	+26	50	
4	SC Freiburg	22	14	5	3	45	20	+25	49	
5	1. FFC Frankfurt	22	10	7	5	40	28	+12	37	

=== Frauen DFB-Pokal ===
9 October 2016 Round of 32	1. FC Riegelsberg	0–15	Bayern Munich	Sportpark, Riegelsberg
14:00		Report	Leupolz 14', 83'; Gerhardt 18', 39'; Falknor 30', 34'; Rolser 45+1', 60'; Maier 57', 65'; Miedema 67' van der Gragt 73', 78', 85' (pen.); Pekel 87'	Attendance: 1,934; Referee: Baitinger

3 December 2016 Round of 16	Arminia Ibbenbüren	0–8	Bayern Munich	Schierloh, Ibbenbüren
16:00		Report	Miedema 2', 9', 56'; Däbritz 33', 50'; Baunach 64' (pen.); Laudehr 67'; Wenninger 78' (pen.)	Attendance: 2,632; Referee: Schweinefuss

15 March 2017 Quarterfinals	Bayern Munich	0–2	VfL Wolfsburg	Grünwalder, Munich
19:00		Report	Wullaert 73'; Lewandowski 86' (o.g.)	Attendance: 465; Referee: Wozniak

== Bundesliga statistics ==
Bundesliga squad and statistics
No.	Pos.	Born	FIFA nationality ^{1}	Player	Games		Goals	Disciplinary record		
No.	Pos.	Born	FIFA nationality ^{1}	Player	Pl.	St.	Goals	Booked	(yellow card) (yellow-red card)	Sent off (straight red)
31	Goalkeeper	1995	**Austria**	Manuela Zinsberger	10	10	0	0	0	0
32	Goalkeeper	1986	**Finland**	Tinja-Riikka Korpela	12	12	0	0	0	0
2	Defender	1985	**United States**	Gina Lewandowski	21	21	2	1	0	0
3	Defender	1992	**Netherlands**	Stefanie van der Gragt	9	9	0	2	0	0
5	Defender	1988	**Switzerland**	Caroline Abbé	15	10	2	1	0	0
6	Defender	1989	**Germany**	Katharina Baunach	12	6	1	1	0	0
15	Defender	1987	**Norway**	Nora Holstad Berge	15	13	1	0	0	0
19	Defender	1991	**Austria**	Carina Wenninger	19	14	2	3	0	0
20	Defender	1992	**Germany**	Leonie Maier	17	15	0	2	1	0
22	Defender	1989	**Germany**	Verena Faißt	11	10	0	1	0	0
25	Defender	1991	**Austria**	Viktoria Schnaderbeck	12	12	0	0	0	0
7	Midfielder	1985	**Germany**	Melanie Behringer	20	20	5	6	0	0
8	Midfielder	1994	**Germany**	Melanie Leupolz	10	5	0	0	0	0
9	Midfielder	1986	**Switzerland**	Vanessa Bürki	7	3	1	0	0	0
11	Midfielder	1993	**Germany**	Lena Lotzen	2	1	1	0	0	0
13	Midfielder	1993	**Japan**	Mana Iwabuchi	3	2	0	0	0	0
14	Midfielder	1994	Germany	Sarah Romert	3	0	0	0	0	0
21	Midfielder	1986	**Germany**	Simone Laudehr	7	6	1	2	0	0
27	Midfielder	1998	Germany	Anna Gerhardt	9	2	1	0	0	0
33	Midfielder	1995	**Germany**	Sara Däbritz	22	21	1	2	0	0
35	Midfielder	2000	Germany	Verena Wieder	2	0	0	0	0	0
36	Midfielder	2000	Germany	Sydney Lohmann	3	2	0	0	0	0
10	Forward	1996	**Netherlands**	Vivianne Miedema	22	21	14	2	0	0
18	Forward	1992	**Scotland**	Lisa Evans	15	13	0	0	0	0
29	Forward	1992	Germany	Nicole Rolser	16	10	3	1	0	0
4	Forward	1993	**Sweden**	Fridolina Rolfö	5	3	0	0	0	0
	Forward	1998	**Croatia**	Ivana Slipčević	1	1	0	0	0	0

^{1} Senior internationals in bold
