= Miedema =

Miedema is a surname. Notable people with the surname include:

- Hessel Miedema (1929–2019), Dutch art historian
- Lars Miedema (born 2000), Dutch footballer, brother of Vivianne
- Shannon Miedema (born 1979/80), Canadian politician
- Vivianne Miedema (born 1996), Dutch footballer

== See also ==
- Medema
