= List of international goals scored by Ellen White =

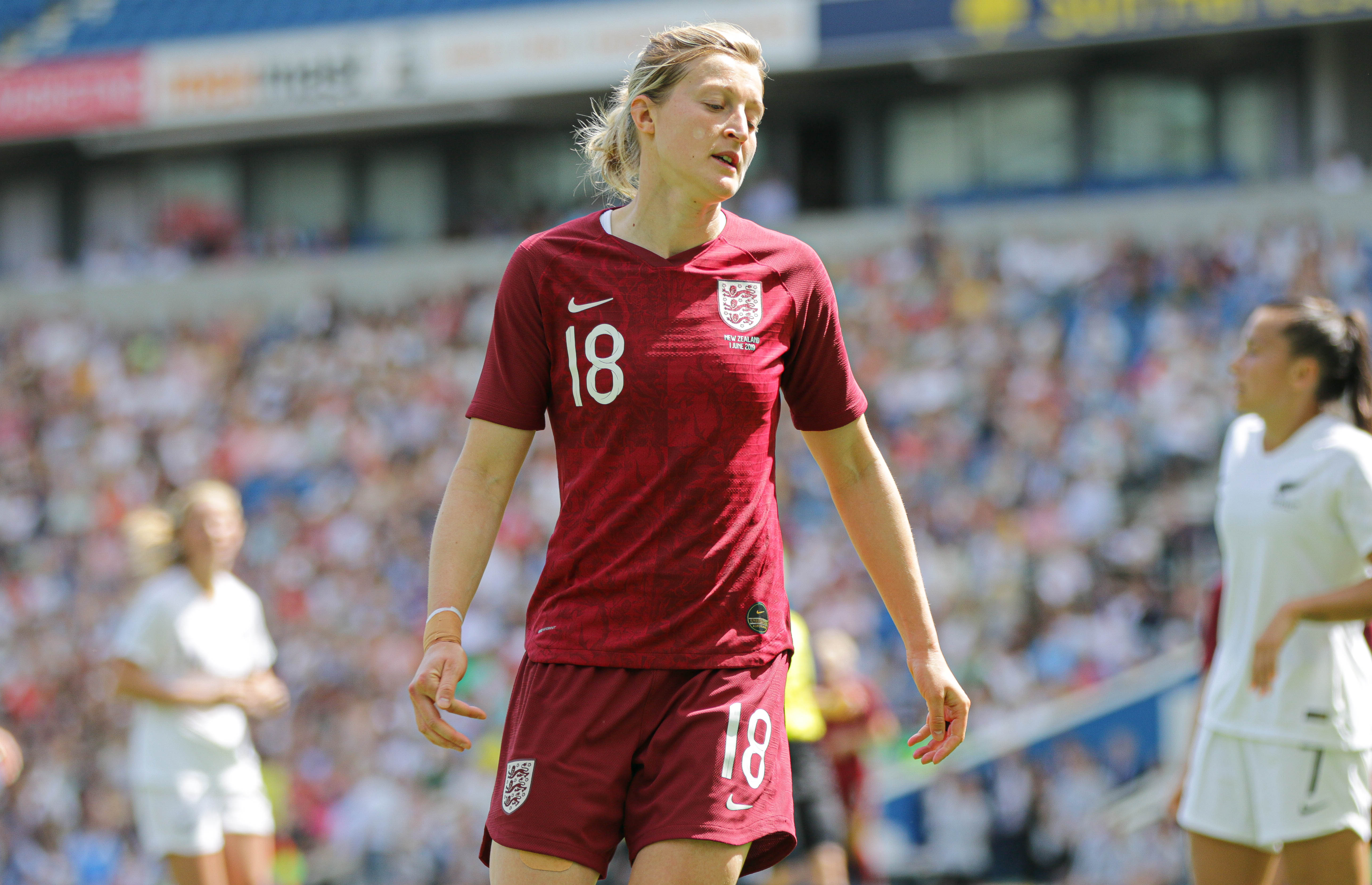
White playing for England in 2019: she played 113 games for England and eight for Great Britain.

Ellen White is an English former professional footballer who played for both England and Great Britain between 2010 and 2022, and scored 58 international goals during that time. For England, White scored 52 goals in 113 international appearances, making her the country's all-time top scorer; she surpassed Kelly Smith's record of 46 goals by scoring the third goal out of 20 against Latvia in a 2023 FIFA Women's World Cup qualifying match, which was part of a record win for any senior England team.

White made her international debut for England on 25 March 2010 in a 3−0 home win over Austria, scoring the third goal in the 2011 FIFA Women's World Cup qualification match. England manager Hope Powell, who gave White her debut, was unsurprised that she scored on her debut, referencing her attitude, hard work and her commitment to being one of the best. A regular during her England career, White won the 2022 UEFA Women's Championship, England's first major women's tournament. She scored her first international hat-trick for England on 23 February 2021 in a home friendly against Northern Ireland, a game which England won 6−0 at St George's Park, Burton upon Trent. She scored a second hat-trick for England against Latvia in November 2021, and a single hat-trick for Great Britain against Australia at the 2020 Summer Olympics. White scored her final goal for England in a 8−0 win over Norway during the group-stage of the 2022 UEFA Women's Championship. She announced her international retirement on 22 August 2022, following the final of the 2022 Euros.

White played for Great Britain at two Summer Olympic tournaments. She made her Olympic debut in a 1−0 win over New Zealand at the 2012 tournament hosted by the United Kingdom. She played all four matches for Great Britain at the tournament before her team was knocked out by Canada in a 2−0 defeat during the quarter-final. At the 2020 Summer Olympics, held during 2021 in Tokyo, Japan, White scored six goals, leaving as the joint-second top goalscorer behind Dutch striker Vivianne Miedema with ten goals. Although she scored a hat-trick, Great Britain left the tournament following a quarter-final defeat against Australia after extra time.

== Goals ==
Scores and results list her team's goal tally first, score column indicates score after each White goal.

Table key
Indicates that her team won the match
Indicates the match ended in a draw
Indicates that her team lost the match

List of international goals scored by Ellen White
No.	Team	Date	Venue	Opponent	Score	Result	Competition	Ref.
1	England	25 March 2010	Loftus Road, London, England	Austria	3–0	3–0	2011 FIFA World Cup qualification	
2	England	20 May 2010	Centenary Stadium, Ta' Qali, Malta	Malta	5–0	6–0	2011 FIFA World Cup qualification	
3	England	29 July 2010	Bescot Stadium, Walsall, England	Turkey	2–0	3–0	2011 FIFA World Cup qualification	
4	England	21 August 2010	Sepp Doll Stadium, Krems, Austria	Austria	4–0	4–0	2011 FIFA World Cup qualification	
5	England	2 March 2011	GSZ Stadium, Larnaca, Cyprus	Italy	1–0	2–0	2011 Cyprus Cup	
6	England	5 July 2011	Impuls Arena, Augsburg, Germany	Japan	1–0	2–0	2011 FIFA World Cup	
7	England	22 September 2011	County Ground, Swindon, England	Slovenia	2–0	4–0	UEFA Euro 2013 qualification	
8	England	23 November 2011	Keepmoat Stadium, Doncaster, England	Serbia	2–0	2–0	UEFA Euro 2013 qualification	
9	England	31 March 2012	Gradski stadion, Nikšić, Montenegro	Croatia	4–0	6–0	UEFA Euro 2013 qualification	
10	England	6 March 2013	GSP Stadium, Strovolos, Cyprus	Italy	4–2	4–2	2013 Cyprus Cup	
11	England	8 March 2013	GSZ Stadium, Larnaca, Cyprus	Scotland	1–1	4–4	2013 Cyprus Cup	
12	England	11 March 2013	GSZ Stadium, Larnaca, Cyprus	New Zealand	1–1	3–1	2013 Cyprus Cup	
13	England	7 April 2013	New York Stadium, Rotherham, England	Canada	1–0	1–0	Friendly	
14	England	4 July 2013	Skarsjövallen, Uddevalla, Sweden	Sweden	1–0	1–4	Friendly	
15	England	21 September 2013	Dean Court, Bournemouth, England	Belarus	2–0	6–0	2015 FIFA World Cup qualification	
16	England	26 September 2013	Fratton Park, Portsmouth, England	Turkey	3–0	8–0	2015 FIFA World Cup qualification	
17	England	26 September 2013	Fratton Park, Portsmouth, England	Turkey	6–0	8–0	2015 FIFA World Cup qualification	
18	England	4 June 2016	Adams Park, High Wycombe, England	Serbia	4–0	7–0	UEFA Euro 2017 qualification	
19	England	7 June 2016	Kuća Fudbala, Stara Pazova, Serbia	Serbia	2–0	7–0	UEFA Euro 2017 qualification	
20	England	4 March 2017	Red Bull Arena, Harrison, United States	United States	1–0	1–0	2017 SheBelieves Cup	
21	England	10 April 2017	Stadium MK, Milton Keynes, England	Austria	1–0	3–0	Friendly	
22	England	1 July 2017	Gladsaxe Stadium, Copenhagen, Denmark	Denmark	1–0	2–1	Friendly	
23	England	1 July 2017	Gladsaxe Stadium, Copenhagen, Denmark	Denmark	2–1	2–1	Friendly	
24	England	19 July 2017	Stadion Galgenwaard, Utrecht, Netherlands	Scotland	3–0	6–0	UEFA Euro 2017	
25	England	4 March 2018	Red Bull Arena, Harrison, United States	Germany	1–1	2–2	2018 SheBelieves Cup	
26	England	4 March 2018	Red Bull Arena, Harrison, United States	Germany	2–2	2–2	2018 SheBelieves Cup	
27	England	27 February 2019	Talen Energy Stadium, Chester, United States	Brazil	1–1	2–1	2019 SheBelieves Cup	
28	England	9 April 2019	County Ground, Swindon, England	Spain	2–0	2–1	Friendly	
29	England	9 June 2019	Allianz Riviera, Nice, France	Scotland	2–0	2–1	2019 FIFA World Cup	
30	England	19 June 2019	Allianz Riviera, Nice, France	Japan	1–0	2–0	2019 FIFA World Cup	
31	England	19 June 2019	Allianz Riviera, Nice, France	Japan	2–0	2–0	2019 FIFA World Cup	
32	England	23 June 2019	Stade du Hainaut, Valenciennes, France	Cameroon	2–0	3–0	2019 FIFA World Cup	
33	England	27 June 2019	Stade Océane, Le Havre, France	Norway	2–0	3–0	2019 FIFA World Cup	
34	England	2 July 2019	Parc Olympique Lyonnais, Lyon, France	United States	1–1	1–2	2019 FIFA World Cup	
35	England	9 November 2019	Wembley Stadium, London, England	Germany	1–1	1–2	Friendly	
36	England	8 March 2020	Red Bull Arena, Harrison, United States	Japan	1–0	1–0	2020 SheBelieves Cup	
37	England	23 February 2021	St George's Park, Burton upon Trent, England	Northern Ireland	1–0	6–0	Friendly	
38	England	23 February 2021	St George's Park, Burton upon Trent, England	Northern Ireland	2–0	6–0	Friendly	
39	England	23 February 2021	St George's Park, Burton upon Trent, England	Northern Ireland	4–0	6–0	Friendly	
40	Great Britain	21 July 2021	Sapporo Dome, Sapporo, Japan	Chile	1–0	2–0	2020 Summer Olympics	
41	Great Britain	21 July 2021	Sapporo Dome, Sapporo, Japan	Chile	2–0	2–0	2020 Summer Olympics	
42	Great Britain	24 July 2021	Sapporo Dome, Sapporo, Japan	Japan	1–0	1–0	2020 Summer Olympics	
43	Great Britain	30 July 2021	Kashima Soccer Stadium, Kashima, Japan	Australia	1–1	3–4 (a.e.t.)	2020 Summer Olympics	
44	Great Britain	30 July 2021	Kashima Soccer Stadium, Kashima, Japan	Australia	2–1	3–4 (a.e.t.)	2020 Summer Olympics	
45	Great Britain	30 July 2021	Kashima Soccer Stadium, Kashima, Japan	Australia	3–4	3–4 (a.e.t.)	2020 Summer Olympics	
46	England	17 September 2021	St Mary's Stadium, Southampton, England	North Macedonia	2–0	8–0	2023 FIFA World Cup qualification	
47	England	17 September 2021	St Mary's Stadium, Southampton, England	North Macedonia	4–0	8–0	2023 FIFA World Cup qualification	
48	England	21 September 2021	Stade de Luxembourg, Luxembourg City, Luxembourg	Luxembourg	1–0	10–0	2023 FIFA World Cup qualification	
49	England	21 September 2021	Stade de Luxembourg, Luxembourg City, Luxembourg	Luxembourg	2–0	10–0	2023 FIFA World Cup qualification	
50	England	26 October 2021	Daugava Stadium, Riga, Latvia	Latvia	3–0	10–0	2023 FIFA World Cup qualification	
51	England	27 November 2021	Stadium of Light, Sunderland, England	Austria	1–0	1–0	2023 FIFA World Cup qualification	
52	England	30 November 2021	Keepmoat Stadium, Doncaster, England	Latvia	2–0	20–0	2023 FIFA World Cup qualification	
53	England	30 November 2021	Keepmoat Stadium, Doncaster, England	Latvia	3–0	20–0	2023 FIFA World Cup qualification	
54	England	30 November 2021	Keepmoat Stadium, Doncaster, England	Latvia	9–0	20–0	2023 FIFA World Cup qualification	
55	England	23 February 2022	Molineux Stadium, Wolverhampton, England	Germany	1–0	3–1	2022 Arnold Clark Cup	
56	England	8 April 2022	Toše Proeski Arena, Skopje, North Macedonia	North Macedonia	4–0	10–0	2023 FIFA World Cup qualification	
57	England	11 July 2022	Falmer Stadium, Brighton and Hove, England	Norway	3–0	8–0	UEFA Euro 2022	
58	England	11 July 2022	Falmer Stadium, Brighton and Hove, England	Norway	6–0	8–0	UEFA Euro 2022	

== Hat-tricks ==
List of international hat-tricks scored by Ellen White
No.	For	Opponent	Goals	Score	Venue	Competition	Date	Ref.
1	England	Northern Ireland	3 – (1–0, 2–0, 4–0)	6–0	St George's Park, Burton upon Trent, England	Friendly	23 February 2021	
2	Great Britain	Australia	3 – (1–1, 2–1, 3–4)	3–4	Kashima Soccer Stadium, Kashima, Japan	2020 Summer Olympics	30 July 2021	
3	England	Latvia	3 – (2–0, 3–0, 9–0)	20–0	Keepmoat Stadium, Doncaster, England	2023 FIFA World Cup qualification	30 November 2021	

== Statistics ==
Goals by year
Year	England		Great Britain	
Year	Apps	Goals	Apps	Goals
2010	8	4	—	
2011	8	4	—	
2012	3	1	4	0
2013	7	8	—	
2014	1	0	—	
2015	9	0	—	
2016	2	2	—	
2017	12	5	—	
2018	6	2	—	
2019	15	9	—	
2020	3	1	—	
2021	9	12	4	6
2022	12	4	—	
Total	113	52	8	6

Goals by competition
Competition	Goals
Olympics	6
FIFA World Cup	7
UEFA European Championship	3
FIFA World Cup qualification	17
UEFA European Championship qualification	5
Friendlies	20
Total	58

Goals by opponent
Opponent	Goals
Japan	5
Austria	4
Germany	4
Latvia	4
Australia	3
North Macedonia	3
Northern Ireland	3
Norway	3
Scotland	3
Serbia	3
Turkey	3
Chile	2
Denmark	2
Italy	2
Luxembourg	2
United States	2
Belarus	1
Brazil	1
Cameroon	1
Canada	1
Croatia	1
Malta	1
New Zealand	1
Slovenia	1
Spain	1
Sweden	1
Total	58

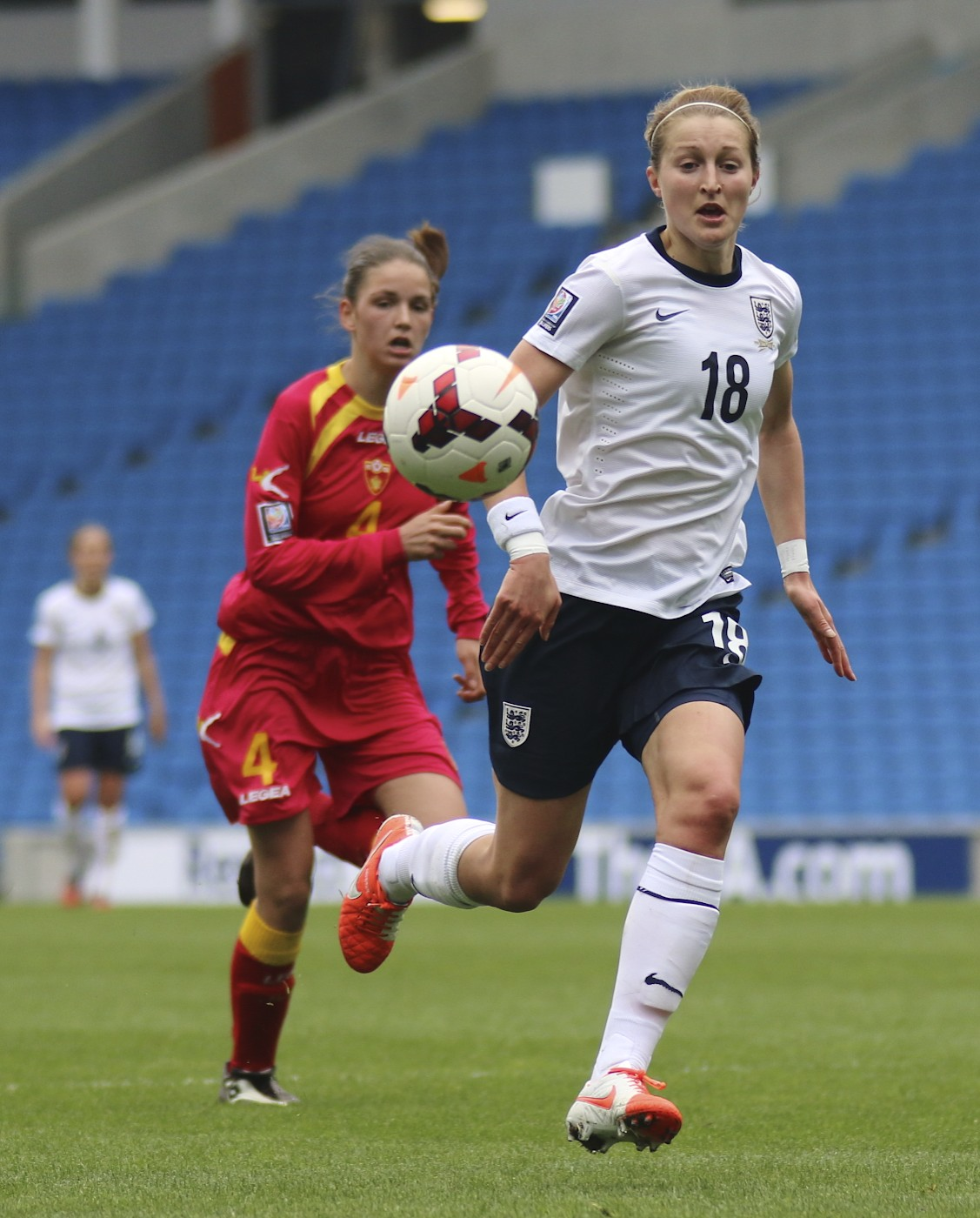
White playing for England against Montenegro in April 2014

== See also ==
- List of women's footballers with 100 or more international caps
- List of top international women's football goal scorers by country
- Lists of hat-tricks
- List of international goals scored by Kelly Smith
