= List of international goals scored by Kelly Smith =

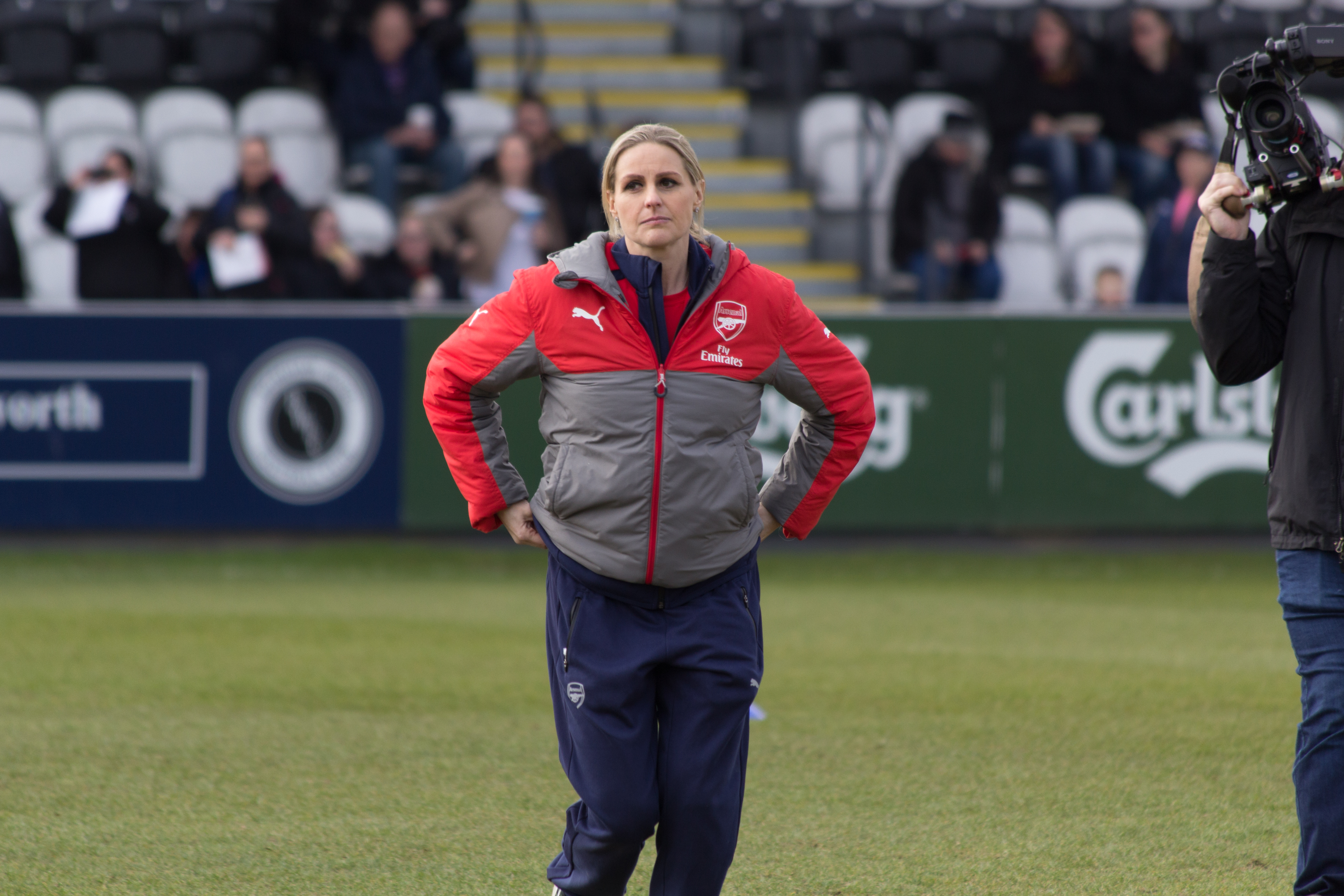
Smith with Arsenal in 2017: she played 117 games for England and four for Great Britain.

Kelly Smith is an English former professional footballer who played for both England and Great Britain between 1995 and 2014, and scored 46 international goals during that time. Smith scored all 46 goals for England in 117 appearances, making her the country's record goalscorer until Ellen White surpassed the record on 30 November 2021. A prolific scorer, former teammate and England captain Steph Houghton declared Smith to be "England's best-ever player" in 2015.

Smith made her international debut for England on 1 November 1995 in a 1−1 home draw with Italy, playing the entire UEFA Women's Euro 1997 qualifying match. At The Valley in London 18 days later, Smith scored her first international goal in a 5−0 win over Croatia, contributing again to England's successful Euro 1997 qualifying campaign. Smith scored her first international hat-trick against Hungary on 27 October 2005 in a 13−0 away win; it was the team's highest winning margin until England defeated Latvia 20−0 on 30 November 2021. In the 2009 Women's Euro final, Smith scored in the 6−2 loss to Germany, a defeat which prolonged England's deprivation of their first major honour. Smith managed 117 caps over a 20-year career with England; she was often considered one of the world's top female players with pundits, coaches and opponents frequently praising her. On 8 March 2013, Smith scored her final goal for England in a 4−4 draw against Scotland in the 2013 Cyprus Cup. She announced her international retirement on 3 February 2015, citing her desire to move into coaching.

With London's successful bid to host the 2012 Summer Olympic Games, the United Kingdom entered a women's team into the football tournament as hosts, despite not traditionally entering. Smith played only four matches for Great Britain. She made her debut in a pre-tournament friendly against Sweden, in preparation for the 2012 Olympics. During the competition, Smith featured in the group matches against Brazil, Cameroon and New Zealand. Great Britain eventually left the tournament following a 2−0 defeat to Canada in the quarter-final, a match in which Smith did not feature. She never scored a goal for Great Britain.

== International goals ==
Scores and results list her team's goal tally first, score column indicates score after each Smith goal. Every international goal scored by Smith was for England.

Table key
Indicates England won the match
Indicates the match ended in a draw
Indicates England lost the match

List of international goals scored by Kelly Smith
No.	Date	Venue	Opponent	Score	Result	Competition	Ref.
1	19 November 1995	The Valley, London, England	Croatia	5–0	5–0	UEFA Euro 1997 qualification	
2	17 March 1996	Stadio San Vito-Gigi Marulla, Cosenza, Italy	Italy	1–0	1–2	UEFA Euro 1997 qualification	
3	18 April 1996	Gradski Vrt Stadium, Osijek, Croatia	Croatia	1−0	2–0	UEFA Euro 1997 qualification	
4	19 May 1996	Griffin Park, London, England	Portugal	2−0	3–0	UEFA Euro 1997 qualification	
5	2 October 2000	Kolos Stadium, Boryspil, Ukraine	Ukraine	1−0	2–1	UEFA Euro 2001 qualification	
6	22 March 2001	Kenilworth Road, Luton, England	Spain	1−1	4–1	Friendly	
7	24 February 2002	Fratton Park, Portsmouth, England	Portugal	2−0	3–0	2003 FIFA World Cup qualification	
8	24 February 2002	Fratton Park, Portsmouth, England	Portugal	3−0	3–0	2003 FIFA World Cup qualification	
9	23 March 2002	Zuiderpark Stadion, The Hague, Netherlands	Netherlands	3−1	4–1	2003 FIFA World Cup qualification	
10	19 February 2004	Fratton Park, Portsmouth, England	Denmark	2–0	2–0	Friendly	
11	26 May 2005	Bescot Stadium, Walsall, England	Czech Republic	2–1	4–1	Friendly	
12	1 September 2005	Ertl Glas Stadion, Amstetten, Austria	Austria	1−1	4–1	2007 FIFA World Cup qualification	
13	27 October 2005	Tapolca Stadium, Tapolca, Hungary	Hungary	1−0	13–0	2007 FIFA World Cup qualification	
14	27 October 2005	Tapolca Stadium, Tapolca, Hungary	Hungary	7−0	13–0	2007 FIFA World Cup qualification	
15	27 October 2005	Tapolca Stadium, Tapolca, Hungary	Hungary	11−0	13–0	2007 FIFA World Cup qualification	
16	31 August 2006	The Valley, London, England	Netherlands	1−0	4–0	2007 FIFA World Cup qualification	
17	31 August 2006	The Valley, London, England	Netherlands	2−0	4–0	2007 FIFA World Cup qualification	
18	31 August 2006	The Valley, London, England	Netherlands	3−0	4–0	2007 FIFA World Cup qualification	
19	8 March 2007	National Hockey Stadium, Milton Keynes, England	Russia	4−0	6–0	Friendly	
20	13 May 2007	Priestfield Stadium, Gillingham, England	Northern Ireland	1−0	4–0	UEFA Euro 2009 qualification	
21	17 May 2007	Roots Hall, Southend-on-Sea, England	Iceland	1−0	4–0	Friendly	
22	11 September 2007	Hongkou Football Stadium, Shanghai, China	Japan	1−1	2–2	2007 FIFA World Cup	
23	11 September 2007	Hongkou Football Stadium, Shanghai, China	Japan	2−1	2–2	2007 FIFA World Cup	
24	17 September 2007	Chengdu Longquanyi Football Stadium, Chengdu, China	Argentina	4−1	6–1	2007 FIFA World Cup	
25	17 September 2007	Chengdu Longquanyi Football Stadium, Chengdu, China	Argentina	5−1	6–1	2007 FIFA World Cup	
26	27 October 2007	Bescot Stadium, Walsall, England	Belarus	2−0	4–0	UEFA Euro 2009 qualification	
27	14 February 2008	GSZ Stadium, Larnaca, Cyprus	Norway	2–1	2–1	Friendly	
28	28 September 2008	Ďolíček, Prague, Czech Republic	Czech Republic	2−1	5–1	UEFA Euro 2009 qualification	
29	28 September 2008	Ďolíček, Prague, Czech Republic	Czech Republic	5−1	5–1	UEFA Euro 2009 qualification	
30	2 October 2008	Estadio Ruta de la Plata, Zamora, Spain	Spain	2–2	2–2	UEFA Euro 2009 qualification	
31	9 February 2009	Alpha Sports Centre, Larnaca, Cyprus	Finland	1−0	2–2	Friendly	
32	11 February 2009	Alpha Sports Centre, Larnaca, Cyprus	Finland	3−1	4–1	Friendly	
33	5 March 2009	GSZ Stadium, Larnaca, Cyprus	South Africa	3−0	6–0	2009 Cyprus Cup	
34	12 March 2009	GSP Stadium, Strovolos, Cyprus	Canada	2−1	3–1	2009 Cyprus Cup	
35	28 August 2009	Finnair Stadium, Helsinki, Finland	Russia	3–2	3–2	UEFA Euro 2009	
36	6 September 2009	Tampere Stadium, Tampere, Finland	Netherlands	2−0	2–1	UEFA Euro 2009	
37	10 September 2009	Helsinki Olympic Stadium, Helsinki, Finland	Germany	2−3	2–6	UEFA Euro 2009 final	
38	20 May 2010	National Stadium, Ta' Qali, Malta	Malta	2−0	4–0	2011 FIFA World Cup qualification	
39	21 August 2010	Sepp-Doll Stadion, Krems, Austria	Austria	1−0	4–0	2011 FIFA World Cup qualification	
40	21 August 2010	Sepp-Doll Stadion, Krems, Austria	Austria	2−0	4–0	2011 FIFA World Cup qualification	
41	12 September 2010	New Meadow, Shrewsbury, England	Switzerland	2–0	2–0	2011 FIFA World Cup qualification	
42	16 September 2010	Stadion Niedermatten, Wohlen, Switzerland	Switzerland	1−0	3–2	2011 FIFA World Cup qualification	
43	2 March 2011	GSZ Stadium, Larnaca, Cyprus	Italy	2–0	2–0	2011 Cyprus Cup	
44	28 February 2012	GSP Stadium, Strovolos, Cyprus	Finland	2−1	3–1	2012 Cyprus Cup	
45	28 February 2012	GSP Stadium, Strovolos, Cyprus	Finland	3−1	3–1	2012 Cyprus Cup	
46	8 March 2013	GSZ Stadium, Larnaca, Cyprus	Scotland	4–3	4–4	2013 Cyprus Cup	

== Hat-tricks ==
List of international hat-tricks scored by Kelly Smith
No.	Opponent	Goals	Score	Venue	Competition	Date	Ref.
1	Hungary	3 – (1–0', 7–0', 11–0')	13–0	Tapolca Stadium, Tapolca, Hungary	2007 FIFA World Cup qualification	27 October 2005	
2	Netherlands	3 – (1–0', 2–0', 3–0')	4–0	The Valley, London, England	2007 FIFA World Cup qualification	31 August 2006	

== Statistics ==
Goals by year
Year	England		Great Britain	
Year	Apps	Goals	Apps	Goals
1995	2	1	—	
1996	6	3	—	
1997	6	0	—	
1998	5	0	—	
1999	0	0	—	
2000	5	1	—	
2001	7 (Note: The Women's Football Archive incorrectly lists Smith's number of England caps as 116; the list of appearances does not include the match against Denmark on 23 August 2001. According to The Football Association, she made 117 appearances for England.)	1	—	
2002	3	3	—	
2003	4	0	—	
2004	3	1	—	
2005	8	5	—	
2006	7	3	—	
2007	14	8	—	
2008	7	4	—	
2009	12	7	—	
2010	10	5	—	
2011	10	1	—	
2012	2	2	4	0
2013	4	1	—	
2014	2	0	—	
Total	117	46	4	0

Goals by competition
Competition	Goals
Olympics	0
FIFA World Cup	4
UEFA European Championship	3
FIFA World Cup qualification	15
UEFA European Championship qualification	11
Friendlies	13
Total	46

Goals by opponent
Opponent	Goals
Netherlands	5
Finland	4
Austria	3
Czech Republic	3
Hungary	3
Portugal	3
Argentina	2
Croatia	2
Italy	2
Japan	2
Russia	2
Spain	2
Switzerland	2
Belarus	1
Canada	1
Denmark	1
Germany	1
Iceland	1
Malta	1
Northern Ireland	1
Norway	1
Scotland	1
South Africa	1
Ukraine	1
Total	46

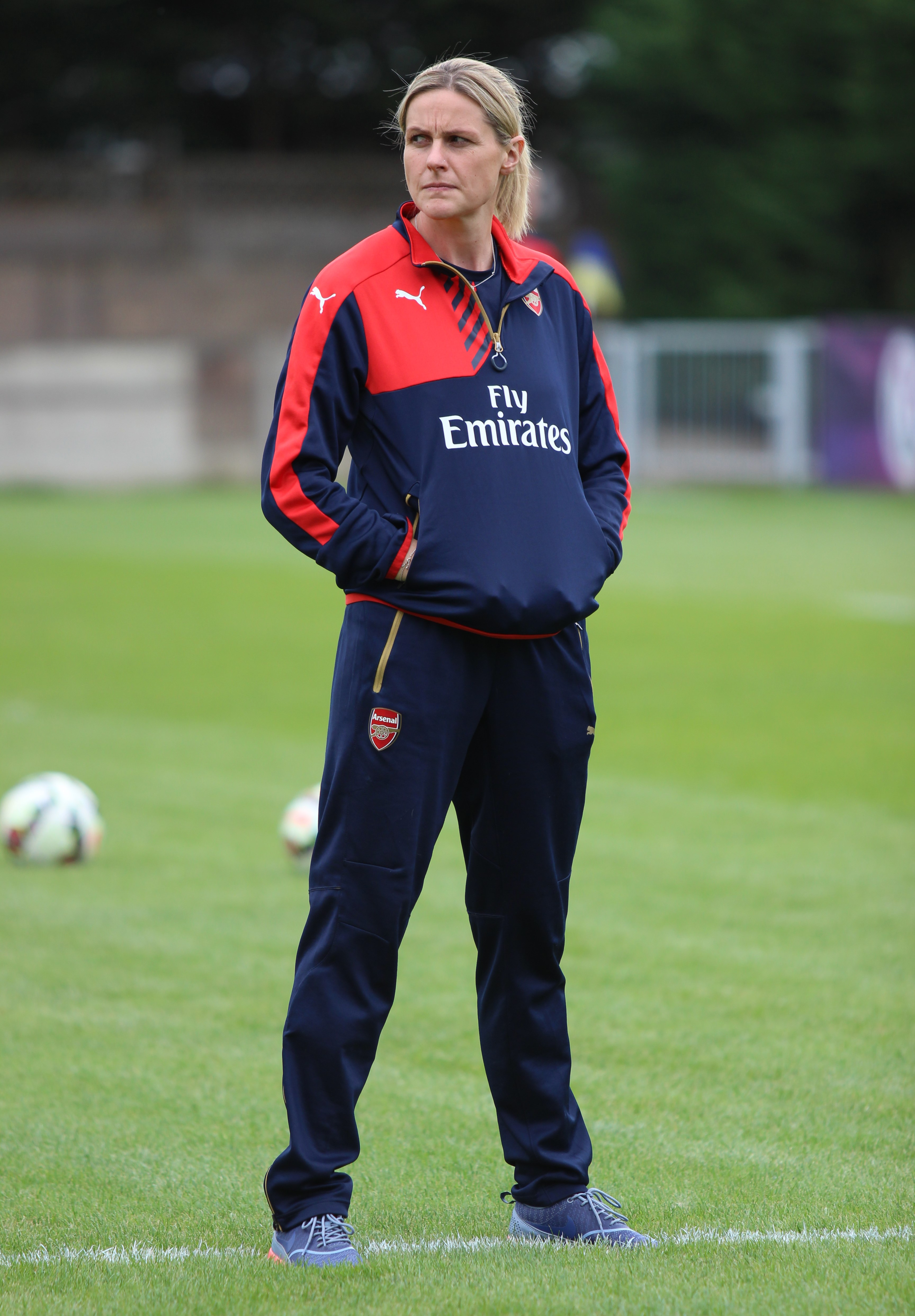
Smith scored five goals against The Netherlands; it was the most goals she scored against a single international opponent.

== See also ==
- List of women's footballers with 100 or more international caps
- Lists of hat-tricks
- List of international goals scored by Ellen White
