= WSL PFA Fans' Player of the Year =

The WSL PFA Fans' Player of the Year award (sometimes called the PFA Fans' Women Player of the Year or simply the Fans' Player of the Year) is an annual award given to a footballer in The Football Association's Women's Super League (FA WSL).

The award is organised by the Professional Footballers' Association (PFA) and sponsored by Bristol Street Motors. It was first given in 2020 for best performance during the 2019–20 season. The shortlist is compiled by the members of the PFA, and then the winner is voted for by the fans of the league.

The 2020 winner was Arsenal's Vivianne Miedema. Other nominees were Bethany England, Guro Reiten, Sophie Ingle, Ellie Roebuck and Chloe Kelly.

== Winners ==
Year	Player	Club	Notes
2019–20	(Netherlands) Vivianne Miedema	Arsenal	
2020–21	(Australia) Sam Kerr	Chelsea	
2021–22	(Australia) Sam Kerr	Chelsea	

== See also ==
- PFA Women's Players' Player of the Year
- PFA Women's Young Player of the Year
