= Anna Gerhardt =

German footballer

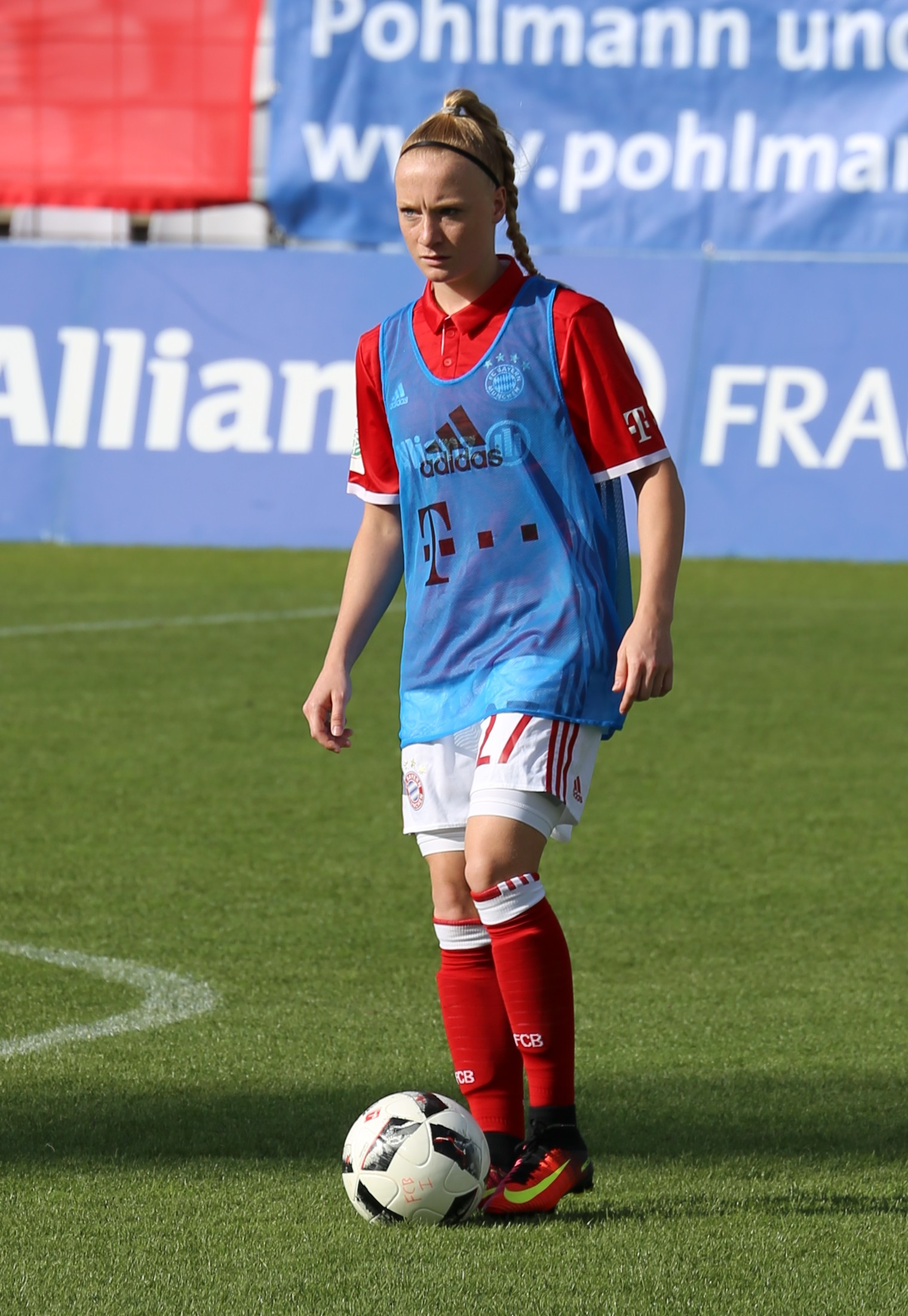
- Gerhardt in 2016

Personal information
- Date of birth: 17 April 1998 (age 28)
- Place of birth: Würselen, Germany
- Height: 1.67 m (5 ft 6 in)
- Position: Defender

Team information
- Current team: 1. FC Köln
- Number: 21

Youth career
- –2009: SC Kreuzau 05
- 2009–2015: 1. FC Köln

Senior career*
Years	Team	Apps	(Gls)
2014–2016	1. FC Köln	41	(10)
2016–2019	Bayern Munich II	8	(0)
2016–2019	Bayern Munich	11	(1)
2019–2023	Turbine Potsdam	60	(0)
2023–	1. FC Köln	63	(3)

International career
2012–2013	Germany U15	5	(0)
2013–2014	Germany U16	7	(0)
2014–2015	Germany U17	13	(2)
2015–2017	Germany U19	18	(2)
2016	Germany U20	5	(0)
- * Club domestic league appearances and goals as of 19 September 2026

Anna Gerhardt (born 17 April 1998) is a German professional footballer who plays as a defender for Frauen-Bundesliga club 1. FC Köln.

== International career ==
She was youth international for Germany on several selection levels.

== Personal life ==
She is the younger sister of Yannick Gerhardt. She is in a relationship with her teammate, a Slovenian football player Sara Agrež.

== Honours ==
1. FC Köln

- 2. Frauen-Bundesliga Süd: 2014–15

Germany U16

- Nordic-Cup-Victress: 2014

=== Individual ===
- Fritz Walter Medal: Silver 2016
