= Nicole Rolser =

German footballer

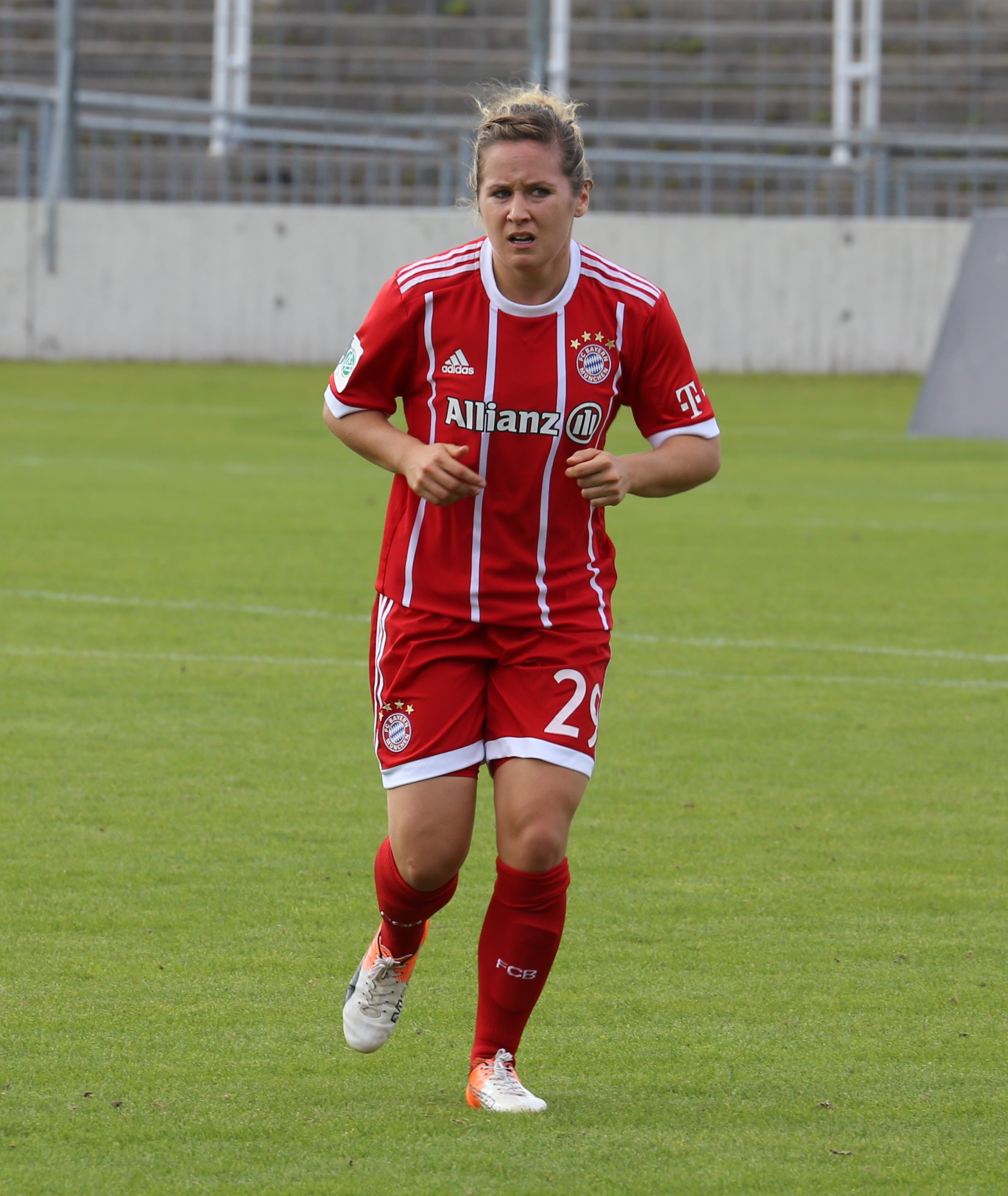
- Rolser with Bayern Munich in 2017

Personal information
- Full name: Nicole Rolser
- Date of birth: 7 February 1992 (age 34)
- Place of birth: Ochsenhausen, Germany
- Position: Midfielder

Team information
- Current team: Bayern Munich
- Number: 29

Youth career
- SV Mietingen
- –2008: VfL Munderkingen

Senior career*
Years	Team	Apps	(Gls)
2009–2010	VfL Sindelfingen	21	(1)
2010–2012	SC 07 Bad Neuenahr	44	(14)
2013–2015	Liverpool Ladies	20	(11)
2015–2020	Bayern Munich	65	(15)

International career^{‡}
2007	Germany U15	5	(3)
2007–2008	Germany U16	8	(9)
2008–2009	Germany U17	11	(9)
2019–2011	Germany U19	18	(4)
2012	Germany U20	9	(3)
2018–	Germany	2	(0)
- * Club domestic league appearances and goals as of 29 December 2017 ‡ National team caps and goals as of 16:04, 6 October 2018 (UTC)

Nicole Rolser (born 7 February 1992) is a German footballer who last played for Bayern Munich.

== Career ==
Rolser started her professional career in 2009–10 at second division VfL Sindelfingen. In their first season she played 21 league matches and scored one goal. For 2010–11, Rolser moved to Bundesliga SC 07 Bad Neuenahr, where she became a regular player straight away and scored ten goals in 21 league games. Her debut was on 15 August 2010 in a 4–3 victory at home to SG Essen-Schönebeck, scoring a goal to put her side 3–2 up in the 63rd Minute.

In December 2012, Rolser signed a contract with the Liverpool Ladies in the English WSL. With the FA WSL side she won two league titles consecutively in 2013 and 2014.

On 2 July 2015 Rolser signed with the German club Bayern Munich on a two-year contract.

== Honours ==
=== Club ===
Liverpool Ladies

- WSL Women's Super League: 2013, 2014

Bayern München

- Bundesliga: 2015–16

=== National team ===
- UEFA Women's Under-17 Championship:
  - Winner: 2009
- UEFA Women's Under-19 Championship:
  - Winner: 2011
- FIFA U-20 Women's World Cup:
  - Runner-up: 2012

=== Individual ===
- Liverpool Women's Players' Player of the Season Award: 2014

== See also ==
- Foreign players in the FA WSL
