= Jacintha Weimar =

Dutch footballer (born 1998)

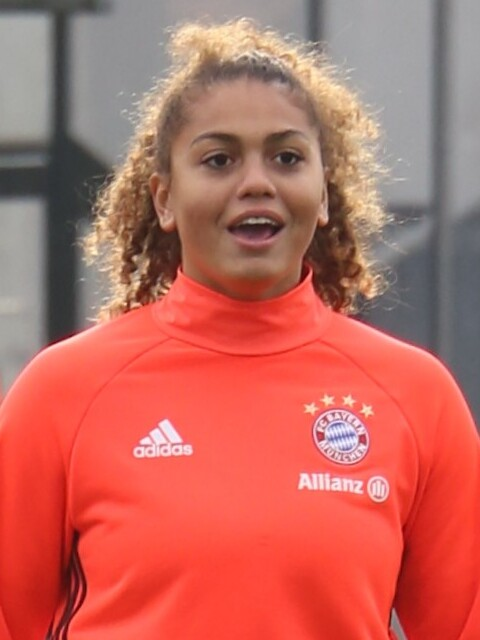
- Weimar in 2016

Personal information
- Full name: Jacintha Anouchka Weimar
- Date of birth: 11 June 1998 (age 28)
- Place of birth: Eindhoven, Netherlands
- Height: 1.79 m (5 ft 10 in)
- Position: Goalkeeper

Team information
- Current team: Servette FC

Youth career
- 2005–2013: Best Vooruit
- 2013–2016: CTO Eindhoven

Senior career*
Years	Team	Apps	(Gls)
2016–2020	Bayern Munich II	18	(0)
2018–2020	Bayern Munich	1	(0)
2020–2021	SC Sand	9	(0)
2021–2026	Feyenoord	94	(0)
2026–	Servette FC	0	(0)

International career^{‡}
2014	Netherlands U16	3	(0)
2014	Netherlands U17	1	(0)
2016–2017	Netherlands U19	9	(0)
2018	Netherlands U20	1	(0)
2024	Netherlands U23	1	(0)
2023–	Netherlands	1	(0)
- * Club domestic league appearances and goals as of 22 May 2026 ‡ National team caps and goals as of 8 April 2024

Jacintha Anouchka Weimar (born 11 June 1998) is a Dutch professional footballer who plays as a goalkeeper for Swiss Super League club Servette FC and the Netherlands national team.

== Club career ==
=== Bayern Munich ===
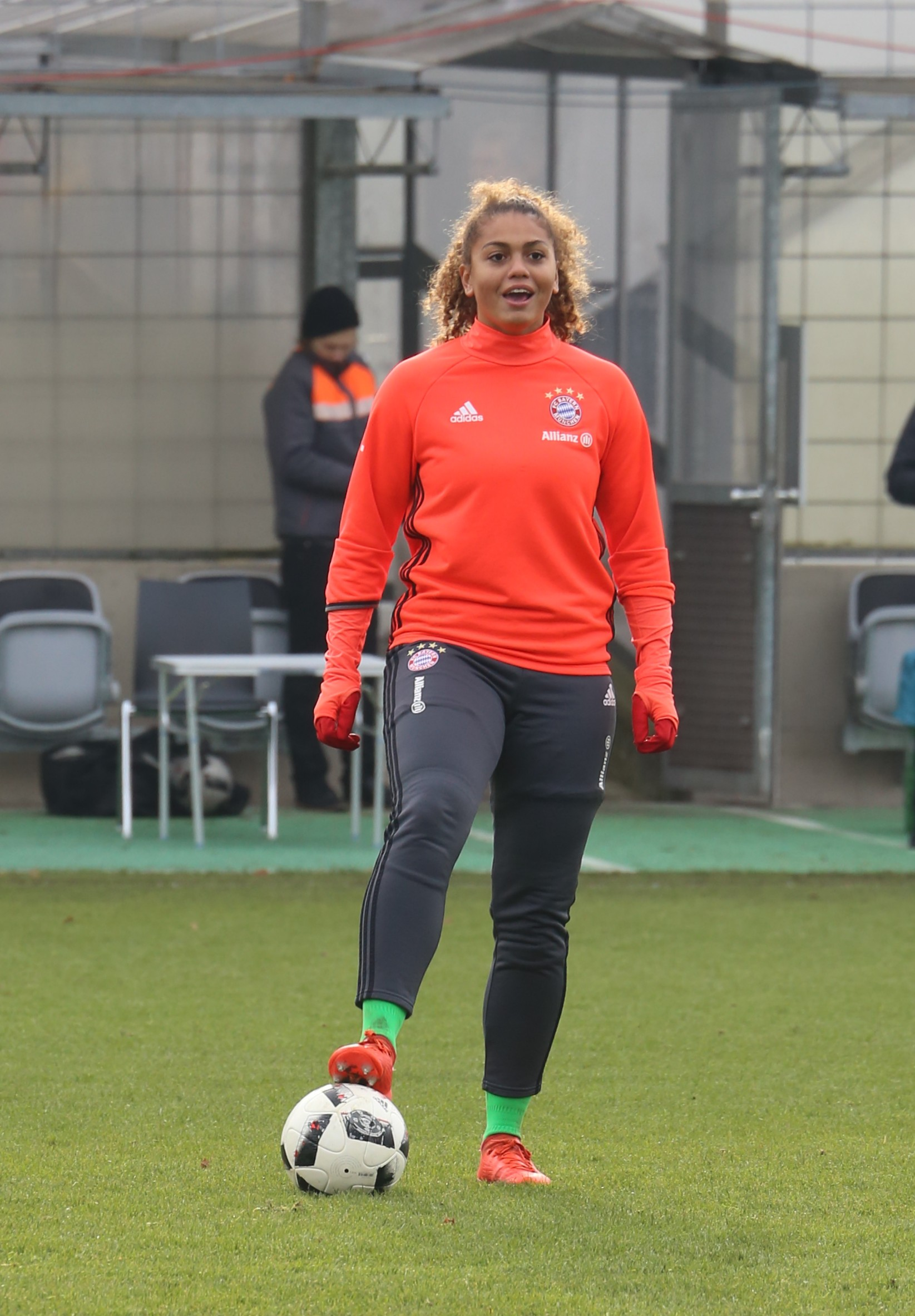
Weimar with Bayern Munich in 2016

A graduate of CTO Eindhoven, Weimar joined Frauen-Bundesliga club Bayern Munich in June 2016. She made her league debut against Borussia Mönchengladbach on 5 December 2018.

Weimar also played for Bayern's II side, making her league debut against Köln on 25 September 2016.

=== SC Sand ===
Weimar made her league debut against Bayern Munich on 6 September 2020.

=== Feyenoord ===
After spending a season at SC Sand, she moved to newly formed Eredivisie club Feyenoord in July 2021. She made her league debut against ADO Den Haag on 29 August 2021.

In April 2022, she signed a two-year contract extension with the club until June 2024.

=== Servette FC ===
On 4 July 2026, it was announced that Weimar joined Swiss Super League club Servette FC for the new season.

== International career ==
Weimar is a former Dutch youth international. She was included in the national team squad for the 2018 FIFA U-20 Women's World Cup.

In April 2022, Weimar was called up to the senior team for the first time. Initially named in the stand-by list for UEFA Women's Euro 2022, she was later added to the 23-player main squad following the injury of Sari van Veenendaal.

On 31 May 2023, she was named as part of the Netherlands provisional squad for the 2023 FIFA Women's World Cup.

== Personal life ==
Weimar was born in the Netherlands to a Dutch father and a Surinamese mother. Besides playing for Feyenoord, she is also a social trainer at the Feyenoord Foundation. She is in relationship with her girlfriend Joyce DeReus since 2019.

== Career statistics ==
=== International ===
As of match played 22 September 2023

Appearances and goals by national team and year
National team	Year	Apps	Goals
Netherlands
Netherlands	2023	1	0
Total		1	0
