= Lars Miedema =

Dutch footballer

Personal information
- Date of birth: 6 March 2000 (age 26)
- Place of birth: De Wolden, Netherlands
- Height: 1.89 m (6 ft 2 1/2 in)
- Position: Forward

Team information
- Current team: Hoogeveen
- Number: 15

Youth career
- –2019: PEC Zwolle

Senior career*
Years	Team	Apps	(Gls)
2019–2021	Den Bosch	13	(0)
2021	Vélez CF	7	(0)
2021–2022	Genemuiden	27	(11)
2022–2023	DVS '33	10	(2)
2023–2024	Berkum		
2024–	Hoogeveen	0	(0)
- * Club domestic league appearances and goals as of 11:35, 9 January 2026 (UTC)

Lars Miedema (born 6 March 2000) is a Dutch footballer who plays as a forward for Derde Divisie club Hoogeveen. He is the brother of Manchester City W.F.C. player Vivianne Miedema.

== Career ==
Born in De Wolden, Miedema grew up in the town of Hoogeveen. After playing for Jong PEC Zwolle, he joined FC Den Bosch in September 2019. He made his debut for the club on 20 September 2019 in a 4–0 win at home to MVV Maastricht.

In January 2021, he signed for Spanish side Vélez CF. However, he only stayed in Spain until the summer, returning to the Netherlands with SC Genemuiden. In 2022, he joined DVS '33, scoring two goals in 10 league games, before joining VV Berkum in January 2023.

== Personal life ==
His sister is fellow footballer Vivianne Miedema, who plays for FA WSL club Manchester City and the Netherlands women's national football team. He and his sister both support Feyenoord.

== Career statistics ==
As of 29 January 2021

Appearances and goals by club, season and competition
Club	Season	League			KNVB Cup		Other		Total	
Club	Season	Division	Apps	Goals	Apps	Goals	Apps	Goals	Apps	Goals
FC Den Bosch	2019–20	Eerste Divisie	8	0	1	0	0	0	9	0
FC Den Bosch	2020–21	Eerste Divisie	5	0	0	0	0	0	5	0
Career total			13	0	1	0	0	0	14	0
