= Verena Schweers =

German footballer (born 1989)

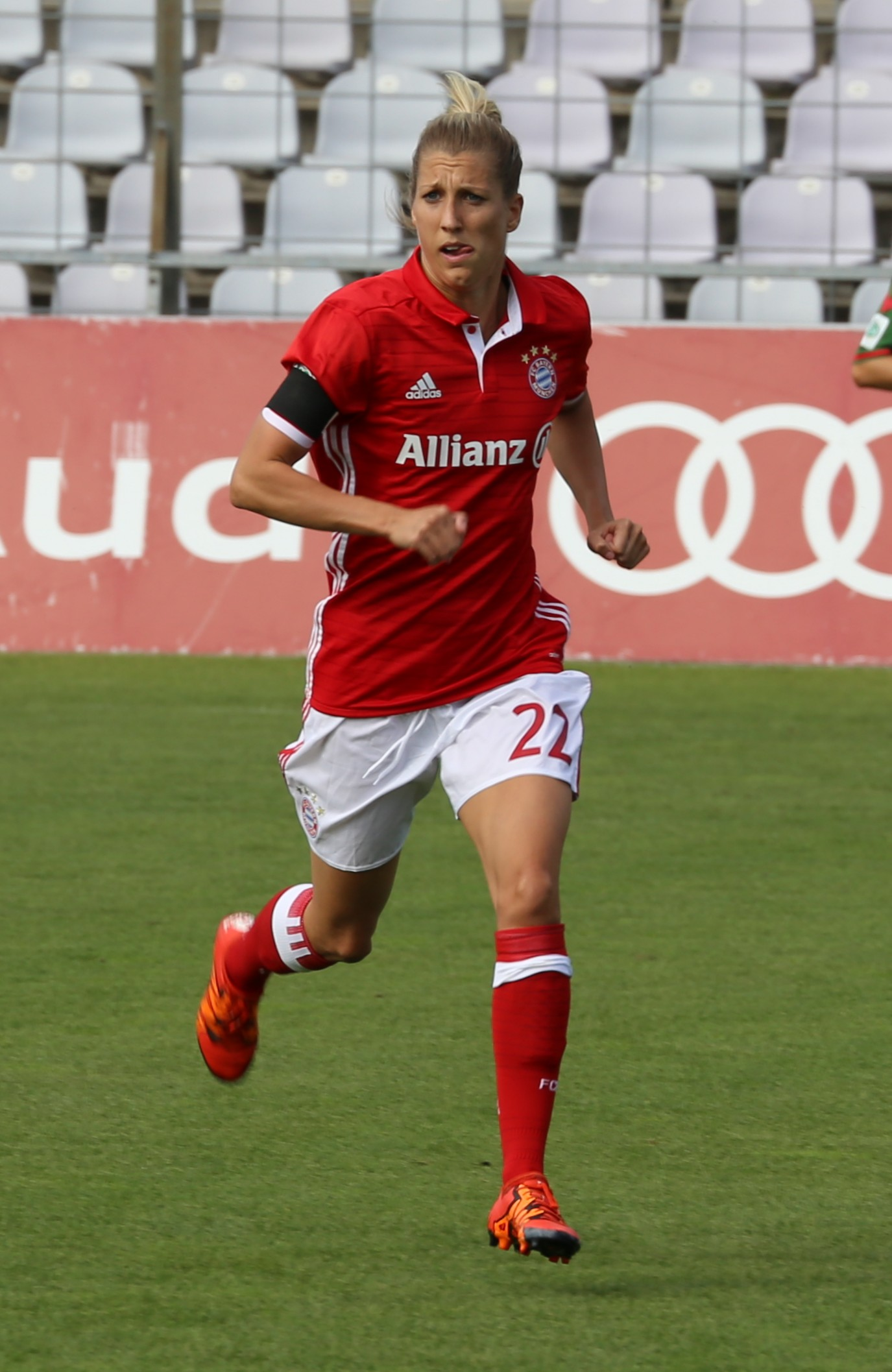
- Schweers with Bayern Munich in 2016

Personal information
- Full name: Verena Schweers
- Birth name: Verena Faißt
- Date of birth: 22 May 1989 (age 37)
- Place of birth: Ettenheim, West Germany
- Height: 1.74 m (5 ft 9 in)
- Position: Defender

Youth career
- 2000–2004: SC Kappel
- 2004–2006: SC Freiburg

Senior career*
Years	Team	Apps	(Gls)
2006–2010	SC Freiburg	81	(3)
2010–2016	VfL Wolfsburg	96	(9)
2016–2020	Bayern Munich	51	(2)
Total		228	(14)

International career
2006–2008	Germany U19	5	(0)
2008–2009	Germany U20	7	(0)
2009–	Germany U23	7	(0)
2010–2019	Germany	47	(3)
- * Club domestic league appearances and goals

Verena Schweers (née Faißt; born 22 May 1989) is a German retired footballer. She played as a defender.

She announced her retirement on 31 July 2020.

== Career ==
=== Club ===
Schweers began her career at SC Kappel in 2000. She moved to SC Freiburg in 2004, where she initially played in the club's youth and second team. For the 2006–07 season, she joined Freiburg's Bundesliga squad and made her first division debut. After seven years at the club, Schweers transferred to VfL Wolfsburg in 2010–11 season. In the 2012–13 season, she won the German League, the German Cup, and the Champion's League with Wolfsburg. In 2014, she won the German League and the Champions League again and in 2015 the German Cup. Schweers transferred to Bayern Munich in the 2016–2017 season, where she signed a two-year contract that will last until 30 June 2018.

=== International ===
At junior level, Schweers represented Germany at the 2008 FIFA U-20 Women's World Cup, reaching third-place. She made her debut for the German senior national team in October 2010 in a friendly match against Australia. Schweers was called up for Germany's 2011 FIFA Women's World Cup squad.

==== International goals ====
Scores and results list Germany's goal tally first:

Schweers – goals for Germany
#	Date	Location	Opponent	Score	Result	Competition
1.	29 November 2012	Halle, Germany	France	1–0	1–1	Friendly
2.	8 March 2013	Parchal, Portugal	Japan	1–0	2–1	2013 Algarve Cup
3.	22 October 2016	Regensburg, Germany	Austria	3–2	4–2	Friendly

== Honours ==
=== Domestic ===
- Bundesliga: Winner 2012–13, 2013–14
- DFB-Pokal: Winner 2012–13, 2014–15, 2015–16

=== International ===
- FIFA U-20 Women's World Cup: Third-place 2008
- UEFA Women's Champions League: Winner 2012–13, 2013–14
