= Vivianne Miedema =

Dutch footballer (born 1996)

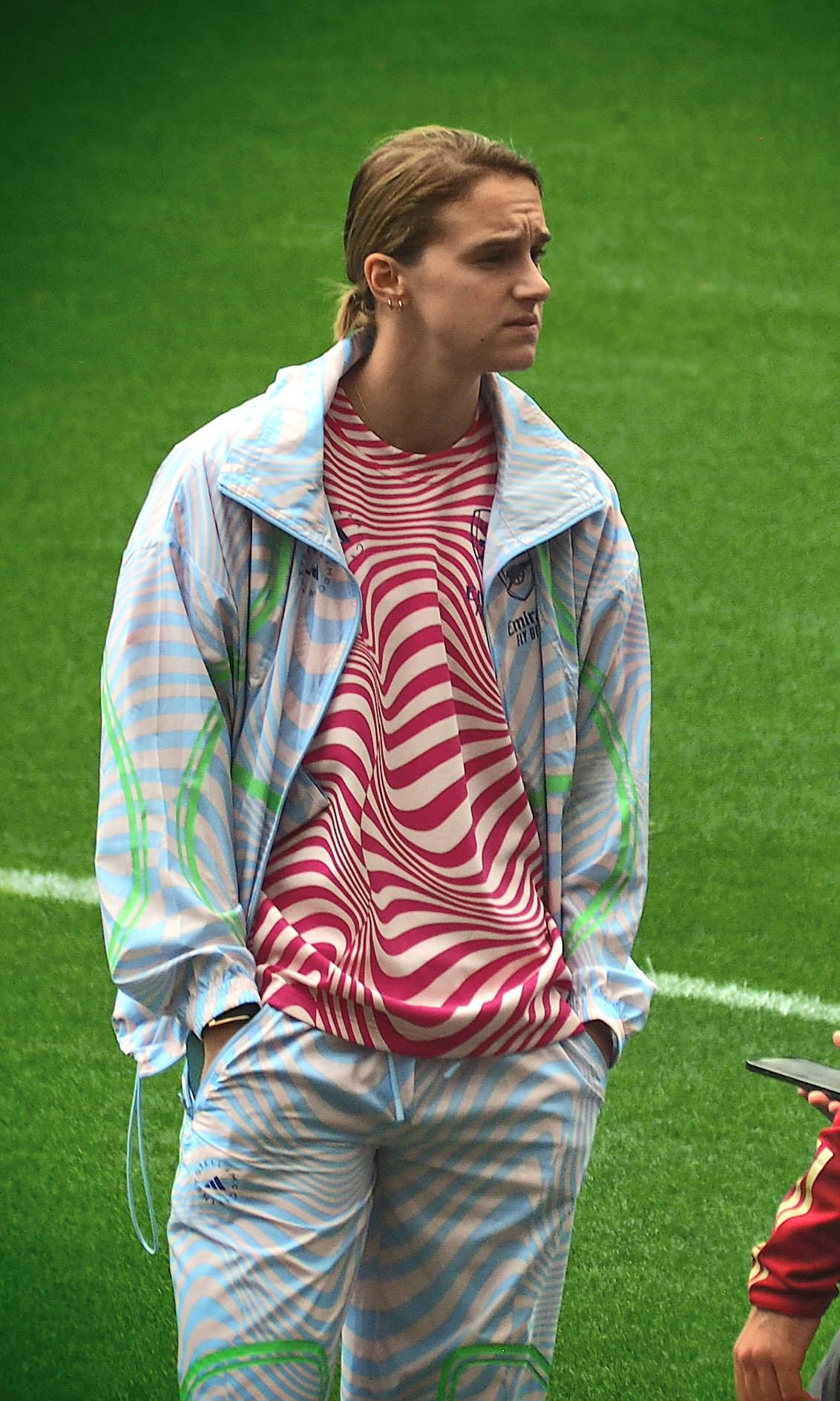
- Miedema in 2023

Personal information
- Full name: Anna Margaretha Marina Astrid Miedema
- Date of birth: 15 July 1996 (age 30)
- Place of birth: Hoogeveen, Netherlands
- Height: 1.77 m (5 ft 10 in)
- Position: Forward

Team information
- Current team: Manchester City
- Number: 10

Youth career
- 2001–2009: HZVV
- 2009–2011: VV de Weide

Senior career*
Years	Team	Apps	(Gls)
2011–2014	SC Heerenveen	69	(78)
2014–2017	Bayern Munich	61	(35)
2017–2024	Arsenal	106	(80)
2024–	Manchester City	32	(17)

International career^{‡}
2010–2011	Netherlands U15	9	(10)
2010–2012	Netherlands U16	11	(4)
2011–2012	Netherlands U17	11	(22)
2013–2014	Netherlands U19	10	(7)
2013–	Netherlands	132	(104)
Medal record
Women's football
Representing the Netherlands
FIFA Women's World Cup
Runner-up	2019 France
UEFA Women's Championship
Winner	2017 Netherlands
- * Club domestic league appearances and goals as of 22:10, 22 November 2026 (UTC) ‡ National team caps and goals as of 7 March 2026

Anna Margaretha Marina Astrid "Vivianne" Miedema (Dutch: [ˈɑnaː mɑrɣaːˈreːtaː maːˈrinaː ˈʔɑstrɪt fiviˈjɑnə ˈmidəmaː]; born 15 July 1996) is a Dutch professional footballer who plays as a striker or attacking midfielder for Women's Super League club Manchester City and the Netherlands national team. She previously played for Arsenal, Bayern Munich, and SC Heerenveen.

Regarded as one of the greatest strikers in women's football history, Miedema is the all-time leading scorer in the Barclays WSL and has scored more goals at the international level for the Netherlands than any other player, across both the women's and men's teams, being the first Dutch player to score one hundred international goals. She won the UEFA Euro in 2017 with the Dutch national team, two consecutive Frauen-Bundesliga titles with Bayern Munich in 2015 and 2016, the 2018–19 FA WSL title with Arsenal and the 2025–26 Women's Super League title with Manchester City. In 2019, she led the Netherlands to a second-place finish at the 2019 FIFA World Cup in France. She has also scored the most goals in a single Women's Olympics tournament with 10 at the Tokyo 2020 Olympics.

Miedema won the BBC Women's Footballer of the Year award in November 2021. In 2020, she was named Women's Player of the Year at the London Football Awards and by England's Football Writers' Association. She was named PFA Women's Players' Player of the Year in 2019. She was shortlisted for the Ballon d'Or in 2019, 2021, 2022, and 2026. She was named to the Top 10 of The Guardian's The 100 Best Female Footballers In The World in 2017, 2019, 2020, 2021, and 2022.

== Early life ==
Born and raised in Hoogeveen, Miedema grew up watching her father play football and at five years old began playing herself for HZVV in her hometown. Her first memory of playing football involves her two front teeth being kicked out by a young goalkeeper at age six. She was a frequent goalscorer from a very young age and played on boys' teams. When opponents laughed when they saw a girl on the pitch, it triggered her to score many goals, which she often did. After several years of playing for HZVV, she joined VV De Weide in 2009 and stayed with them until 2011.

With her father and younger brother Lars, Miedema would often travel 190 kilometres (120 mi) to Rotterdam in order to watch Feyenoord play. At age 14, Miedema was forced to make the decision to continue playing with boys' clubs where she was used to beating them, or to switch to playing for the women's league.

== Club career ==
=== 2011–2014: SC Heerenveen ===
After receiving an offer from SC Heerenveen, Miedema signed her first professional contract as a 14-year-old and found herself playing in the Eredivisie, the top Dutch league, with players much older than herself. She made her senior debut at 15 during a match against FC Utrecht on 2 September 2011, becoming the youngest ever player in the league. In her debut season, the 2011–12 Eredivisie, she scored 10 goals in 17 games for Heerenveen, who finished last of seven teams. Despite being a teenager, she shared the accolades of being the second-highest scorer in the league.

In 2012–13, playing in the new cross-border BeNe League, she improved her tally to 27 goals in 26 games. Her 41 goals in 26 games for Heerenveen in the 2013–14 BeNe League season earned her the top-scorer award at the age of 17. Her goal tally was 15 more than the nearest player.

=== 2014–2017: Bayern Munich ===
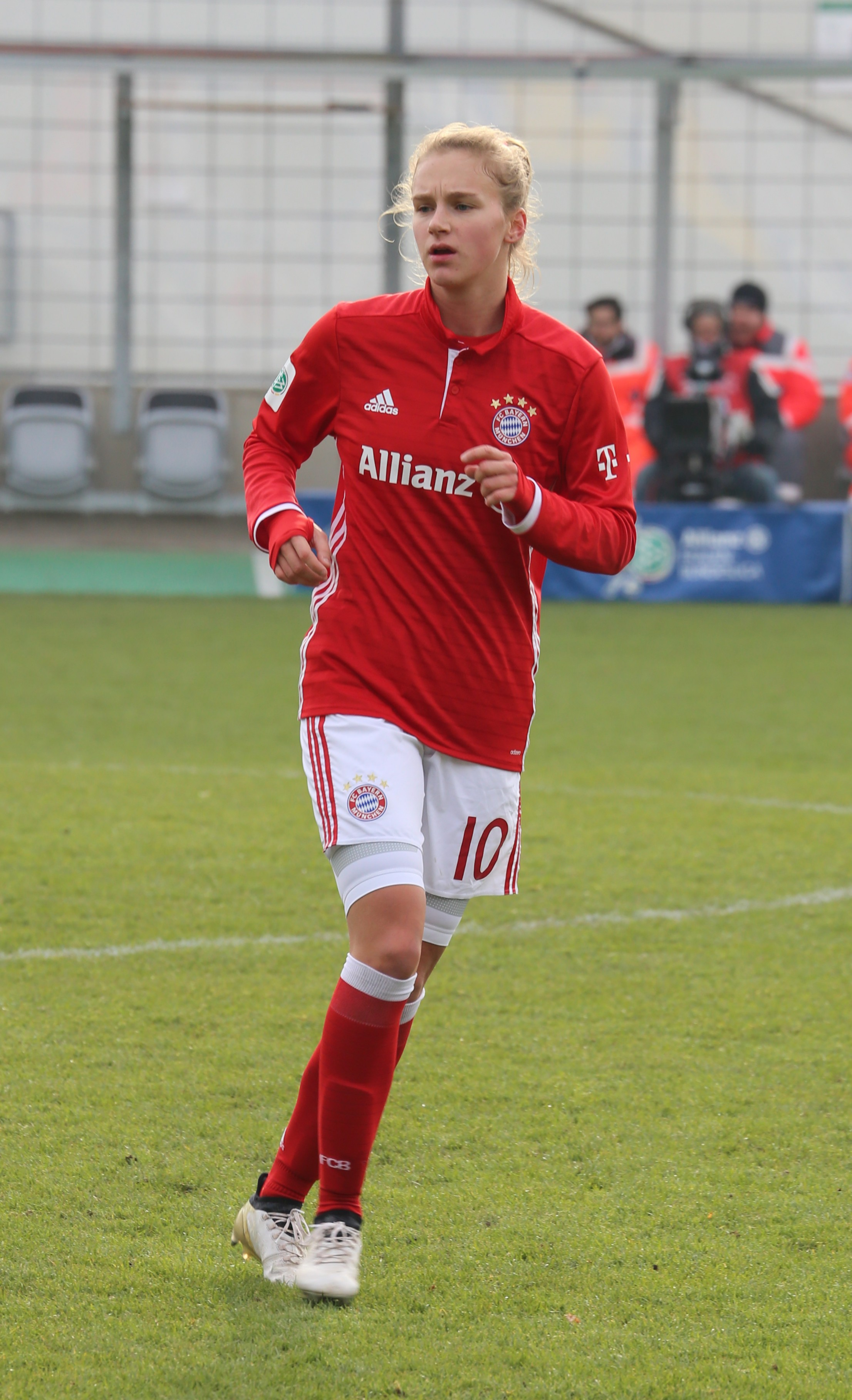
Miedema with Bayern in November 2016

39 different clubs made inquiries about signing Miedema, before she signed a three-year contract with Bayern Munich in the top German league, the Frauen-Bundesliga, in June 2014. During the 2014–15 season, she was part of a Bayern team that remained unbeaten in the Bundesliga and won the title for the first time since 1976. Miedema scored her first league goals in Germany on 5 October 2014 in a match against MSV Duisburg, leading to Bayern's 6–0 win. In the match against SGS Essen on 30 November, Miedema tore the outer band of her ankle resulting in some time away from the pitch. She re-emerged in the German league on 22 February 2015 against VfL Wolfsburg, scoring again in the following match, against Bayer Leverkusen. Miedema finished the season with 7 goals in 17 matches. She helped Bayern Munich defend the title the following season with 14 goals in 22 matches.

Miedema had been unhappy during her first three months in Germany because she could not speak German or English. Although she overcame these difficulties, she later grew dissatisfied with Bayern's long ball tactics. In the 2016–17 Frauen-Bundesliga season, Miedema scored 14 goals in 22 appearances but Bayern were deposed as champions by VfL Wolfsburg. She added eight goals in the 2016–17 UEFA Champions League as Bayern reached the quarter-final, in which they were beaten 4–1 on aggregate by Paris Saint-Germain. Miedema was the top scorer of the Champions League season.

Miedema entered into contract negotiations with other leading clubs in Europe and the United States in 2017. Although Bayern wanted to keep her, they were not prepared to break their pay structure. Despite leading some "tough negotiations" with Miedema, manager Karin Danner was resigned to her departure: "she really wanted to change and we didn't want to break our structure for her in the end." Bayern signed Miedema's compatriots Jill Roord and Lineth Beerensteyn as her replacements.

=== 2017–2024: Arsenal ===
In May 2017, Miedema moved to English club Arsenal. On 29 October, she scored her first goal in the FA Women's Super League (FA WSL) for Arsenal in the match with Everton in the 23rd minute. During a match against Liverpool, she scored the game-opening goal in the 29th minute and provided the assist to Dominique Janssen's goal in the 49th minute lifting Arsenal to a 3–0 win. Miedema finished the 2017–18 season with 4 goals in the 11 matches she played, including 9 starts. Arsenal finished in third place during the regular season with a 11–3–4 record. The club also won the 2017–18 FA WSL Cup, with Miedema scoring the game-winning goal of the final, a 1–0 victory over Manchester City.

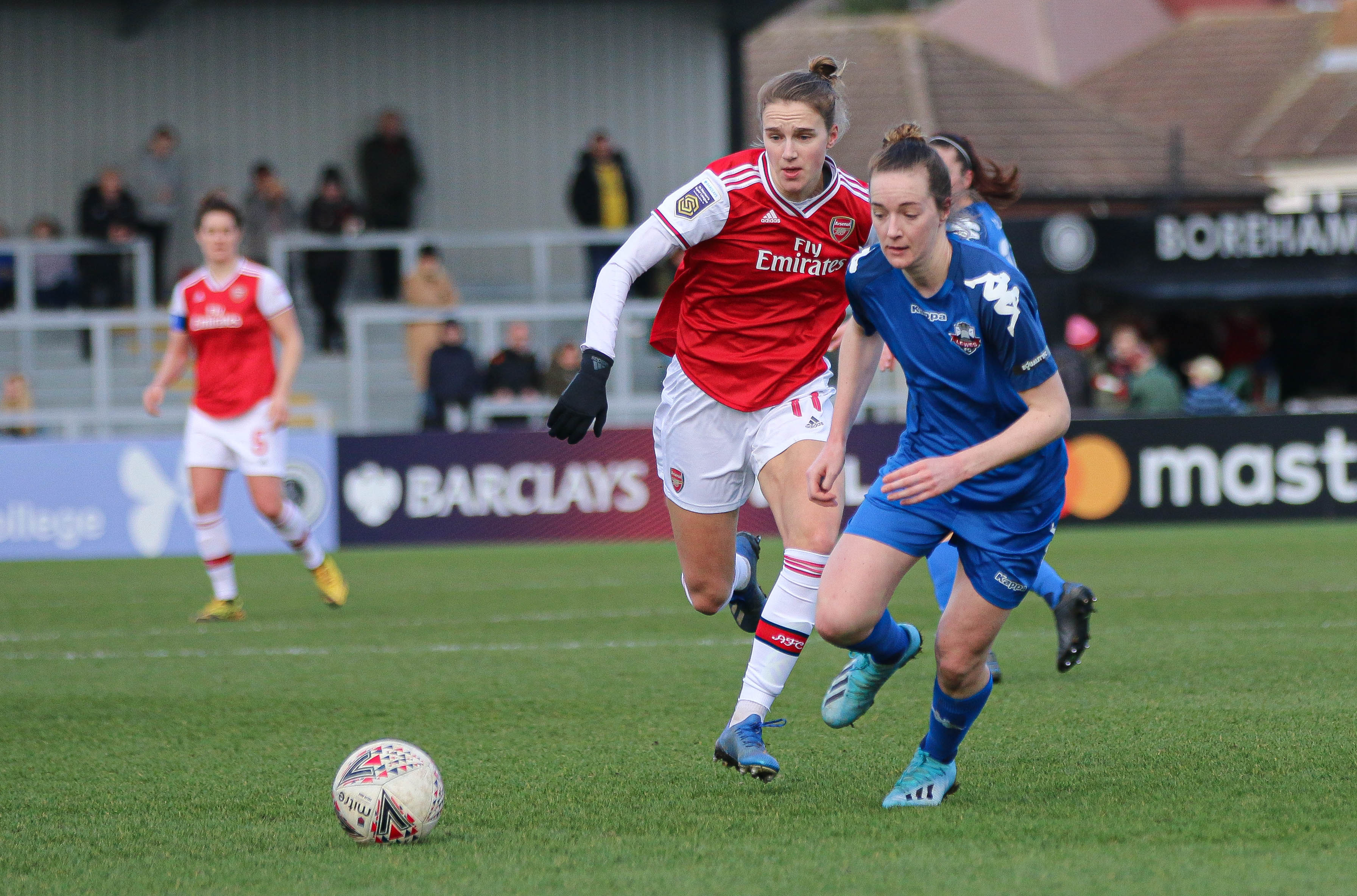
Miedema during a match for Arsenal, February 2020

In the first match of the 2018–19 season, Miedema scored a hat-trick as Arsenal defeated Liverpool 5–0. She brought her goals tally into double-digits with a brace against Bristol City in a 4–0 Arsenal victory. Miedema finished the season as the WSL top scorer with 22 goals and was named PFA Women's Players' Player of the Year. Arsenal finished first in the regular season with a 20–2–0 record, marking the first time the club had clinched the title since 2012.

On 16 October 2019, Miedema scored four goals in Arsenal's 5–2 victory against Slavia Praha in the 2019–20 UEFA Champions League. Five days later, she was shortlisted for the Ballon d'Or for 2019, in which she placed fifth.

During the 2019–20 season, she scored 16 goals in 14 games. Miedema was influential in the largest victory in the history of the WSL on 1 December 2019 – of the 11 goals scored by Arsenal against Bristol City, she scored six and set up four others. The 11th was the only one she was not directly involved in; she was not on the pitch when it was scored. The FA suspended the season because of the COVID-19 pandemic, deciding the competition based on points per game. Arsenal finished in third place with a 12–3–0 record and played in the 2019–20 FA WSL Cup, where they eventually lost 2–1 to Chelsea during the 2020 FA Women's League Cup Final.

On 18 October 2020, Miedema became the first player to score 50 WSL goals, overtaking the all-time league record of 49 (set by Nikita Parris) when she scored a hat-trick in a 6–1 win against Tottenham Hotspur. On 7 February 2021, Manchester City forward Ellen White became the all-time record goal scorer, having scored 55 times to Miedema's 54. On 7 March, Miedema overtook White again, having scored 56 times. Of Miedema's first 52 WSL goals she scored 34 times with her right foot, 14 with her left, and 4 headers. None of the goals came from a penalty. On average she scored once every 83 minutes, compared to Parris' 171 minutes.

On 9 September 2021, Miedema scored her 100th goal for Arsenal, completing a hattrick in a 4–0 win against Slavia Prague in the Champions League qualifier. Miedema required only 110 games in all competitions to reach this milestone. In November 2021 she became the first player in the history of the WSL to score against every team they have faced, after scoring against Manchester United.

On 20 May 2022 Miedema announced she had extended her contract with Arsenal. She had had talks with Barcelona and Paris Saint-Germain who had been interested in signing her. She said that winning titles with Arsenal would mean more to her than joining a team that was winning titles already. The lucrative new contract made her the highest-paid female player in England.

On 15 December 2022, Miedema left a UEFA Champions League match against Lyon at halftime with an injury, which on 19 December was confirmed to be an anterior cruciate ligament tear. She was expected to undergo surgery and miss "an extended period of time". She made her first appearance since the injury on 22 October 2023, coming on as a second-half substitute in a 2–1 win against Bristol City. She scored her first goal back since injury on 28 January 2024 in the 2–0 win against Liverpool. On 1 March it was announced she needed a minor knee surgery that would prevent her from playing for several weeks. She returned on 21 April in the 3–0 victory over Leicester City.

On 13 May 2024, Arsenal confirmed Miedema would leave the club at the end of the 2023–24 season upon the expiry of her contract.

=== 2024–present: Manchester City ===
On 5 July 2024, it was announced that Miedema had signed for Manchester City on a three-year deal and was assigned the number 6 shirt. She scored her first goal for the club during her debut in a 2024–25 UEFA Champions League qualifying match against Paris FC on 18 September.

Miedema had surgery on her left knee on 30 October, having not played since the club's victory over Barcelona on 9 October. The extent of the injury or how long Miedema will be out, has not been revealed by the club. In Manchester City’s official podcast, Miedema admitted that, despite her experience at the highest level by that point, she went through a difficult period when she joined the club: “The move from London to Manchester was still tough, you get into a routine and feel at home in a certain place and then you need to pack up everything and move." When injury struck again, she began to doubt her career: “I’m not sure if I can do this and still want to do this at my age.”

Following a long period of absence following her knee surgery, Miedema returned to play against Ipswich in the FA cup, scoring a goal to contribute to their 3–0 victory.

During the 2024-25 season, she grabbed 11 goals and 4 assists in 19 games across all competitions, including a "phenomenal finish" in the 4–2 victory over Aston Villa that was awarded Barclays Women’s Super League Goal of the Season.

On 5 August 2025, she switched to the number 10 after the departure of teammate and compatriot Jill Roord.

On 9 November 2025, Miedema scored her third league goal of the season, becoming the first player to score 90 career goals in the Women's Super League.

On 1 February 2026, she scored a header and delivered an assist in the match against Chelsea at Etihad Stadium, helping Manchester City secure a magnificent 5–1 victory and consolidate their 11-point lead at the top of the league, extending their winning streak to 13 matches.

On 26 February 2026, it was announced that Manchester City had exercised a clause in Miedema's contract to extend her time with the club until summer 2027. She scored twice in the space of two minutes during a 3–0 derby win over Manchester United in the WSL on 28 March 2026. After this match, she became the first-ever player in WSL history to score 10+ goals in 5 different seasons. She was part of the Manchester City team which won the 2025–26 Women's Super League title. On 31 May 2026, she scored the last of Manchester City's goals in a 4–0 win over Brighton in the 2026 FA Cup final.

On 8 June 2026, Manchester City officially confirmed that Miedema had undergone a successful knee operation. She will work closely with the medical team over the summer, with a view to returning for pre-season ahead of the 2026/27 season.

== International career ==
=== Youth ===
In October 2012 Miedema broke the goalscoring record for the Netherlands under-17 football team, when she scored six goals against Montenegro then eight goals against Kazakhstan in the 2013 UEFA Under-17 Championship qualification mini tournament. The eight goals in the 15–0 win over Kazakhstan also set a competition record for goals in a single match, and four more goals in the next match against Ukraine made her the all-time UEFA Women's Under-17 Championship top scorer. She scored a total of 22 goals for the under-17s, in her 11 appearances between October 2011 and October 2012.

On 6 March 2013, Miedema debuted for the Netherlands under-19 football team, starting a 3–1 defeat by Iceland. At the 2014 UEFA Under-19 Championship, she was vital for the Dutch success, her six goals in the tournament guided the Netherlands to their first-ever title in women's football. She scored a hat-trick in the 4–0 semi final win over the Republic of Ireland, and the only goal in the final win over Spain. She was the tournament top scorer by a margin of four goals and also collected the Golden Player awarded by UEFA to the best player of the tournament. Already a senior national team player, she concluded her under-19 national team career with seven goals from 10 appearances.

=== Senior ===
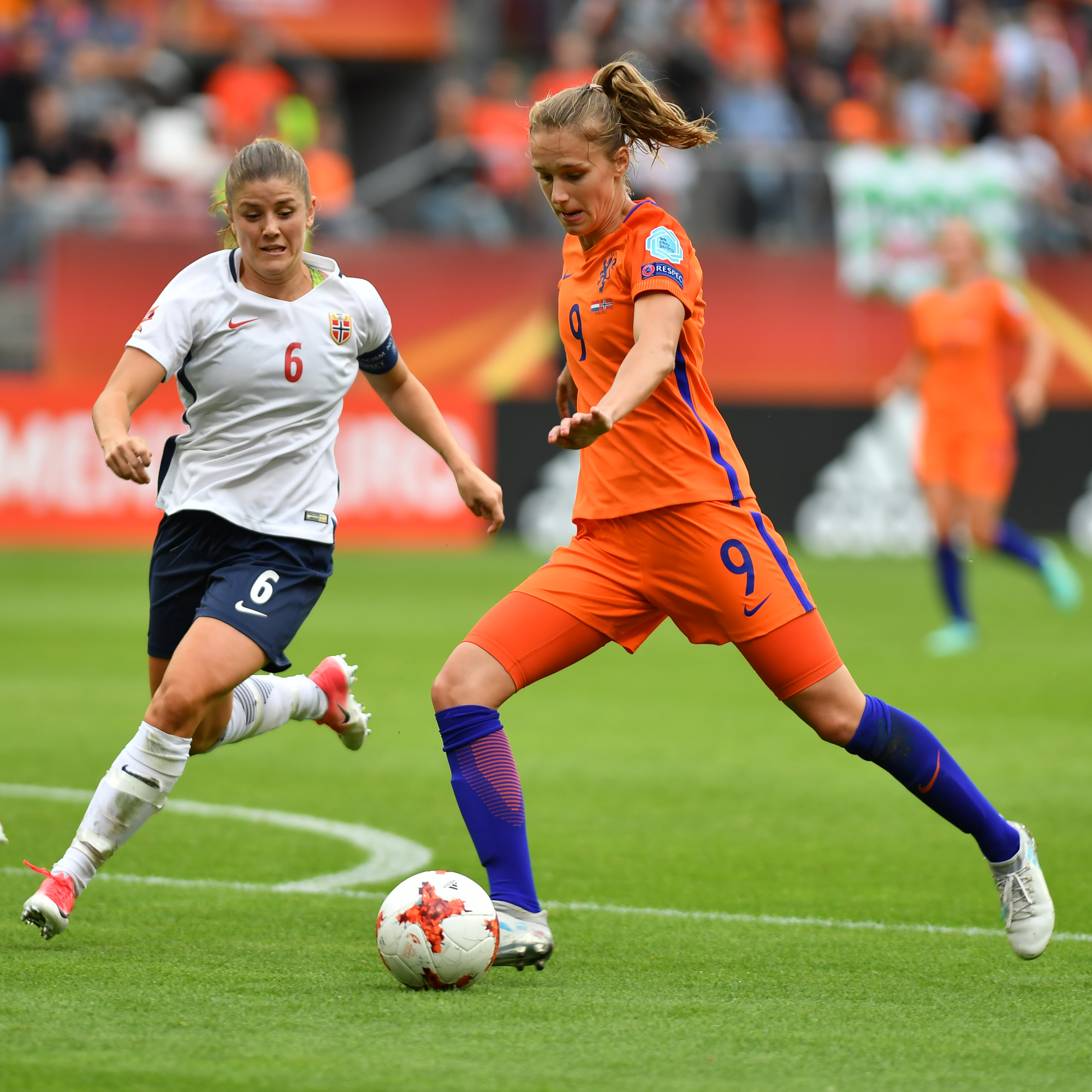
Miedema (right) playing for the Netherlands during the Euro 2017

On 26 September 2013, Miedema made her debut for the Netherlands national team. She was an 84th-minute substitute for Lieke Martens in a 4–0 2015 FIFA World Cup qualification – UEFA Group 5 win over Albania in Tirana. One month later she scored her first goals at the senior international level, a 16-minute hat-trick, in the Netherlands' 7–0 2015 FIFA World Cup qualification – UEFA Group 5 win over Portugal.

In October 2014, Miedema played a key role in the Netherlands' World Cup qualification play-off victory over Scotland. In the first leg at Tynecastle Stadium, her long-range shot was deflected by Scotland goalkeeper Gemma Fay, before Martens converted the rebound. The Dutch were awarded a penalty kick after Miedema was fouled by Frankie Brown inside the box. Manon Melis scored on the penalty kick lifting the Dutch to a 2–1 win ahead of the second leg in Rotterdam.

In the final qualification play-off versus Italy, Miedema scored all of the Dutch goals as the Netherlands won 3–2 on aggregate and advanced to the 2015 FIFA World Cup. She finished as the overall top-scorer in the qualification campaign with 16 goals. Coach Roger Reijners praised Miedema's "killer instinct". Despite being still in her teens, she was widely proclaimed "the most gifted striker in Europe" ahead of the Netherlands' first-ever FIFA Women's World Cup appearance. At the age of 18, her 16 goals during the qualifying tournament matched the previous European record set by Adriana Martín and established Miedema as the seventh-highest goalscorer in the history of UEFA women's national team competitions.

Miedema arrived at the finals in Canada with migraines and an injured foot. Despite the high expectations, a decidedly "off colour" Miedema was unable to replicate her pre-tournament form and failed to score as the Netherlands reached the round of 16 by finishing third in their group, and then lost 2–1 to Japan. She was frustrated by a lack of service which reduced her opportunities to score. Two years later Miedema admitted that the pressure on her at the 2015 World Cup felt "crazy", and she was pleased that other talented Dutch players had emerged afterward to take some of the attention away from her. In 2022 she revealed she nearly quit professional football following the 2015 World Cup finals.

At the 2017 UEFA European Championship she continued to excel under pressure, scoring a goal in the hosts' 3–0 semi-final win over England. Miedema also netted two goals in the final against Denmark, which was enough to secure the first-ever Euro title for the Dutch. After the tournament the whole team was honoured by the Prime Minister Mark Rutte and Minister of Sport Edith Schippers and made Knights of the Order of Orange-Nassau.

On 15 June 2019, Miedema became the all-time top scorer of the Netherlands national team after scoring her 60th goal in a 3–1 win against Cameroon at the 2019 FIFA World Cup in France. She passed the record held by Melis and extended her lead of the men's team's leading scorer, Robin van Persie. In the Netherlands' 2–0 quarter-final victory over Italy, she scored a goal, was named Player of the Match, and led the Dutch team to its first–ever World Cup semi-final. Miedema's performance throughout the tournament was instrumental in leading the Netherlands to the final, where they fell 2–0 to defending champions United States.

At the 2020 Summer Olympics held in Tokyo in 2021, Miedema broke the Olympic record by scoring ten goals in four matches. In the group matches she scored four against Zambia and two each against Brazil and China. In the quarter-final against the United States, her 100th match for the Netherlands, Miedema scored both Dutch goals in the 2–2 draw. In the penalty shoot-out, US goalkeeper Alyssa Naeher saved Miedema's penalty, and the Dutch were eliminated.

In the first match at the 2022 UEFA European Championship in England, against Sweden, Miedema took over the captaincy when Sari van Veenendaal had to leave the pitch injured. Miedema missed the next two group stage matches due to a COVID-19 infection. She wore the captain's armband again in the quarter-final match against France, which the Netherlands lost 1–0.

Miedema was unable to participate at the 2023 FIFA World Cup after sustaining an anterior cruciate ligament tear in December 2022. In the final match of the UEFA Euro 2025 qualifying, against Norway, she levelled the score ten minutes before the final whistle, thus securing the Dutch a place at the Euros. This match also marked Miedema's first full 90-minute game since 7 December 2022, following her anterior cruciate ligament injury.

On 8 April 2025, Miedema suffered a hamstring injury, during their match against Austria, which resulted in her leaving the pitch 15 minutes after being brought on, putting doubt on whether she will be fit in time for the Euros. Following an extended period out, Miedema made her return on 26 June 2025, in a friendly with Finland ahead of the Euro 2025, and scored two goals. On 5 July 2025, she netted her 100th international goal in a 3–0 victory over Wales in the Dutch team's first match of the Euro 2025, becoming the 19th woman to score hundred international goals.

== Style of play ==
Miedema grew up as a Feyenoord supporter and modelled her game on Robin van Persie. As she is Dutch and wore number 10 for Bayern Munich, she has been compared to Arjen Robben. Journalist David Winner, author of a book about Dutch football, sees her style of play as a mix of Marco van Basten and Dennis Bergkamp. Described as intense and a prolific goalscorer, Miedema does not set goalscoring targets for herself. Former Arsenal striker Kelly Smith said of Miedema, "She scores goals with her left and right foot, her head, she sets goals up. For me, she is just the complete striker, and she's the best in the world at the moment. She's always a threat no matter what minute of the game it is. I think her movement is very clever, and her finishing ability is phenomenal. When she's in front of goal it's just this calm, composed approach that she has." Former Swedish international, Nilla Fischer described Miedema as an intelligent and clever player: "She really tries to go on your blind spot and then make a move when you're not ready."

In 2019, Miedema said she plays more like an attacking midfielder: "I know I have my goalscoring qualities, but I like setting people up. I like to drop and pick up the ball and see if I can send someone through on goal." In early 2022 she started playing in midfield rather than in attack. Former Arsenal and England player Ian Wright called her the best striker and the best playmaker in the world at the same time. She is known for not celebrating goals and attributes her modest approach to the down-to-earth nature of her hometown: "I don't like to be the person everyone watches. It's my job. I'm happy if someone else scores. I celebrate more."

== Personal life ==
Since 2022, Miedema has been in a relationship with England footballer, former Arsenal and as of 2026 current Manchester City teammate Beth Mead. Miedema was previously in a relationship with Scottish footballer and ex-Bayern Munich and Arsenal teammate, Lisa Evans, for six years. Miedema picked up a Scottish accent when she dated Evans.

Her younger brother, Lars, is also a footballer, who as of 2020 was playing for FC Den Bosch. Known for her lack of interest in overtly celebrating her goals, she has made the rare exception such as when she became Netherlands' top scorer in 2019 after her brother insisted she mark the achievement, her first WSL goal after returning from her ACL injury in January 2024, or when she scored her 100th goal for the Netherlands (becoming the first Netherlands player to do so) during the Euros 2025.

Miedema is a co-author of Vivianne voetbalt, a series of children's comic books featuring her, written in her native Dutch language.

Miedema has completed the course and got the UEFA-B coaching licence. In 2021, she earned a master's degree in Football Business from the Johan Cruyff Institute.

In 2019, Miedema became an ambassador of War Child, a charity supporting children in war zones. In November 2021, Miedema joined the charity movement Common Goal, committing 1% of her salary to community organisations working with young people. Miedema said "I'm lucky to be living my dream and I feel the responsibility to help others live theirs too. I'm excited to join Common Goal and to be able to really scale the impact I can have off the field." In March 2022 she led Common Goal's emergency response to the help victims of Russia's invasion of Ukraine, together with Juventus player Paulo Dybala. In October 2024 she was one of over a hundred women's footballers to sign an open letter to urge FIFA to stop the Saudi Aramco sponsorship, on the grounds of human rights violations.

In September 2022, Miedema opened a Cruyff Court bearing her name in Hoogeveen, on the location where she used to play as a child.

As of March 2026, Miedema is undergoing the final stages of completing the UEFA-A licence coaching course, including coaching Manchester City's U14 as part of the course training.

== Career statistics ==
=== Club ===
As of match played 22 November 2026

Appearances and goals by club, season and competition
Club	Season	League			National cup (Note: Includes KNVB Women's Cup, DFB-Pokal Frauen, Women's FA Cup)		League cup (Note: Includes FA Women's League Cup)		Continental		Total	
Club	Season	Division	Apps	Goals	Apps	Goals	Apps	Goals	Apps	Goals	Apps	Goals
SC Heerenveen	2011–12	Eredivisie	17	10	2	2	—		—		19	12
SC Heerenveen	2012–13	BeNe League	26	27	2	2	—		—		28	29
SC Heerenveen	2013–14	BeNe League	26	41	1	1	—		—		27	42
SC Heerenveen	Total		69	78	5	5	—		—		74	83
Bayern Munich	2014–15	Frauen-Bundesliga	17	7	2	1	—		—		19	8
Bayern Munich	2015–16	Frauen-Bundesliga	22	14	4	4	—		2 (Note: Appearances in UEFA Women's Champions League)	0	28	18
Bayern Munich	2016–17	Frauen-Bundesliga	22	14	3	4	—		6	8	31	26
Bayern Munich	Total		61	35	9	9	—		8	8	78	52
Arsenal	2017–18	Women's Super League	11	4	3	1	5	3	—		19	8
Arsenal	2018–19	Women's Super League	20	22	1	0	7	9	—		28	31
Arsenal	2019–20	Women's Super League	14	16	4	0	7	3	5	10	30	29
Arsenal	2020–21	Women's Super League	22	18	2	2	3	5	—		27	25
Arsenal	2021–22	Women's Super League	22	14	4	2	1	0	12	7	39	23
Arsenal	2022–23	Women's Super League	8	4	0	0	0	0	7	3	15	7
Arsenal	2023–24	Women's Super League	9	2	1	0	4	0	0	0	14	2
Arsenal	Total		106	80	15	5	27	20	24	20	172	125
Manchester City	2024–25	Women's Super League	11	7	2	1	2	0	4	3	19	11
Manchester City	2025–26	Women's Super League	19	10	2	3	4	1	—		25	14
Manchester City	2026–27	Women's Super League	2	0	0	0	—		0	0	2	0
Manchester City	Total		32	17	4	4	6	1	4	3	46	25
Career total			268	210	33	23	33	21	36	31	370	285

=== International ===
As of match played 7 March 2026

Appearances and goals by national team and year
National team	Year	Apps	Goals
Netherlands	2013	4	7
Netherlands	2014	14	11
Netherlands	2015	12	3
Netherlands	2016	10	8
Netherlands	2017	21	20
Netherlands	2018	7	4
Netherlands	2019	19	16
Netherlands	2020	4	1
Netherlands	2021	13	15
Netherlands	2022	11	10
Netherlands	2023	2	0
Netherlands	2024	3	1
Netherlands	2025	10	8
Netherlands	2026	2	0
Total		132	104

== Honours ==
Bayern Munich

- Frauen-Bundesliga: 2014–15, 2015–16

Arsenal

- Women's Super League: 2018–19;
- FA WSL Cup/FA Women's League Cup: 2017–18, 2022–23, 2023–24; runner-up: 2018–19, 2019–20

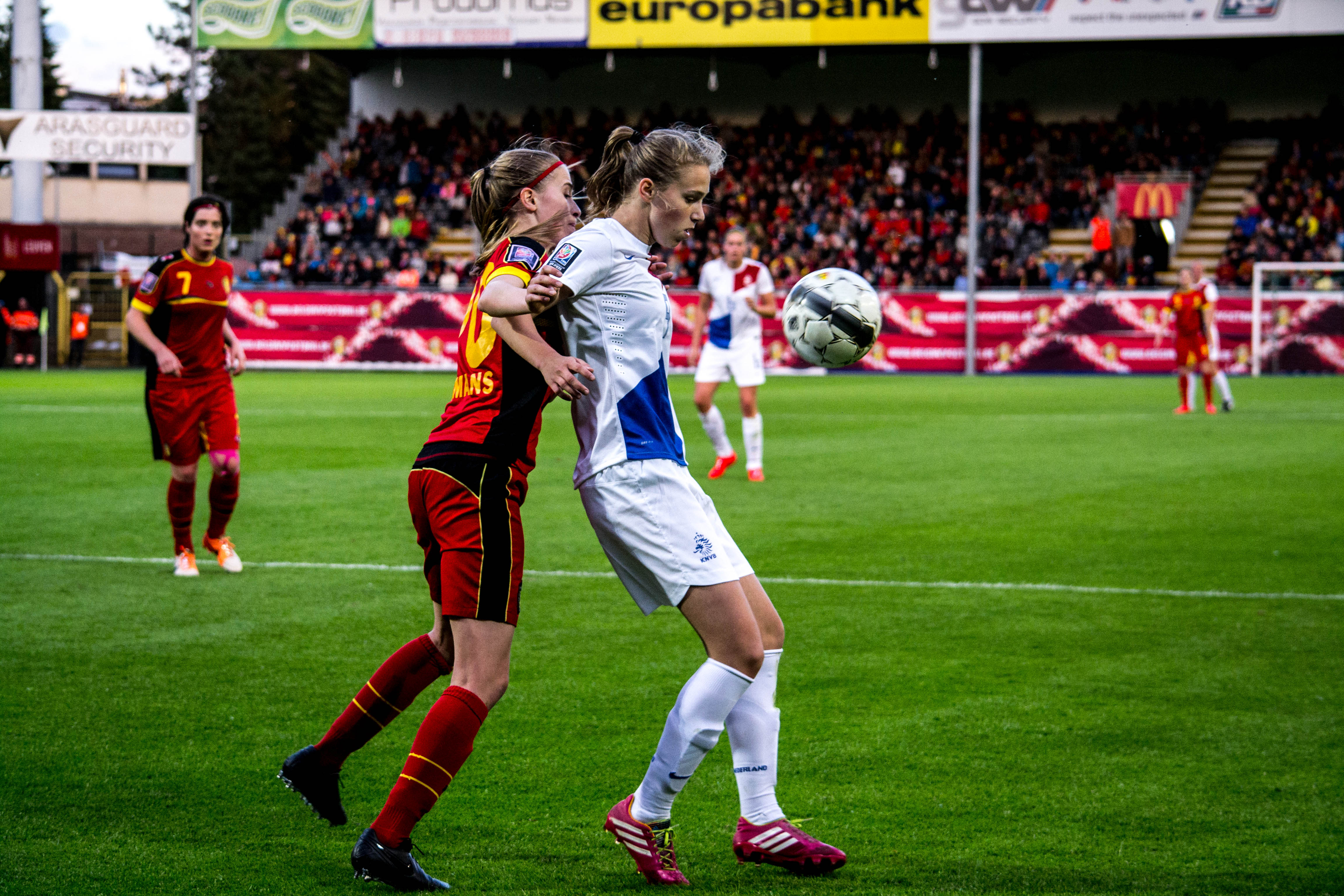
Miedema at age 17 during a match against Belgium in 2014

- FA Women's Cup runner-up: 2017–18, 2020–21

Manchester City

- Women's Super League: 2025–26
- Women's FA Cup: 2025–26

Netherlands U19

- UEFA Women's Under-19 Championship: 2014

Netherlands

- UEFA Women's Championship: 2017
- FIFA Women's World Cup runners-up: 2019
- Tournoi de France: runner-up 2020

Individual

- UEFA Women's Under-19 Championship Golden Player: 2014
- UEFA Women's Under-19 Championship top goalscorer: 2014
- BeNe League top goalscorer: 2013–14
- UEFA Women's Champions League top goalscorer: 2016–17, 2019–20
- UEFA Women's Championship Silver Boot: 2017
- FA Women's Super League Player of the Month: October 2018, December 2019, October 2020
- PFA Women's Players' Player of the Year: 2018–19
- FA Women's Super League Golden Boot: 2018–19, 2019–20
- London Football Awards Women's Player of the Year: 2018–19, 2019–20
- PFA Team of the Year: 2018–19, 2019–20, 2021–22
- FWA Women's Footballer of Year: 2019–20
- Football Supporters' Association Player of the Year: 2019, 2020, 2021
- WSL PFA Fans' Player of the Year: 2019–20
- Arsenal Player of the Season: 2019–20
- FIFA Women's World Cup All-Star Squad: 2019 (Note: The all-star squad in 2019 was named "Players who Dared to Shine".)
- FIFA FIFPro Women's World11: 2020, 2021
- IFFHS Women's World Team: 2020
- BBC Women's Footballer of the Year: 2021
- Her Football Hub Player of the Year: 2020
- FA Women's Super League Goal of the Month: December 2022
- Arsenal Player of the Month: December 2022

Orders

- Knight of the Order of Orange-Nassau: 2017

== Records ==
As of 28 March 2026

Eredivisie

- Youngest player: age 15

WSL

- Most goals scored in league's history: 97
- Most seasons scoring 10+ goals: 5
- Most goal involvements: 138
- Most first-half hat-tricks: 2
- Most goals in a single season: 22
- Most goals in a single game: 6
- Most goal involvements in a single game: 10 (6 goals, 4 assists)
- First player involved in 100 goals
- First player to score against all clubs

Netherlands

- Most goals for the Under-17 team: 14
- Most goals in senior team: 104

Continental

- Most goals in one match for UEFA Under-17 matches: 8
- Most goals in UEFA Under-17 matches: 22
- Most goals in European qualifying matches for a World Cup: 16 (equal with Adriana Martín)

Olympics

- Most goals in a single Olympic tournament: 10

== See also ==
- The 100 Best Female Footballers In The World
- List of foreign FA Women's Super League players
- List of FA WSL hat-tricks
- List of women's footballers with 100 or more international goals
