= BBC Sports Personality of the Year =

British annual awards ceremony

- Current: 2025 BBC Sports Personality of the Year Award
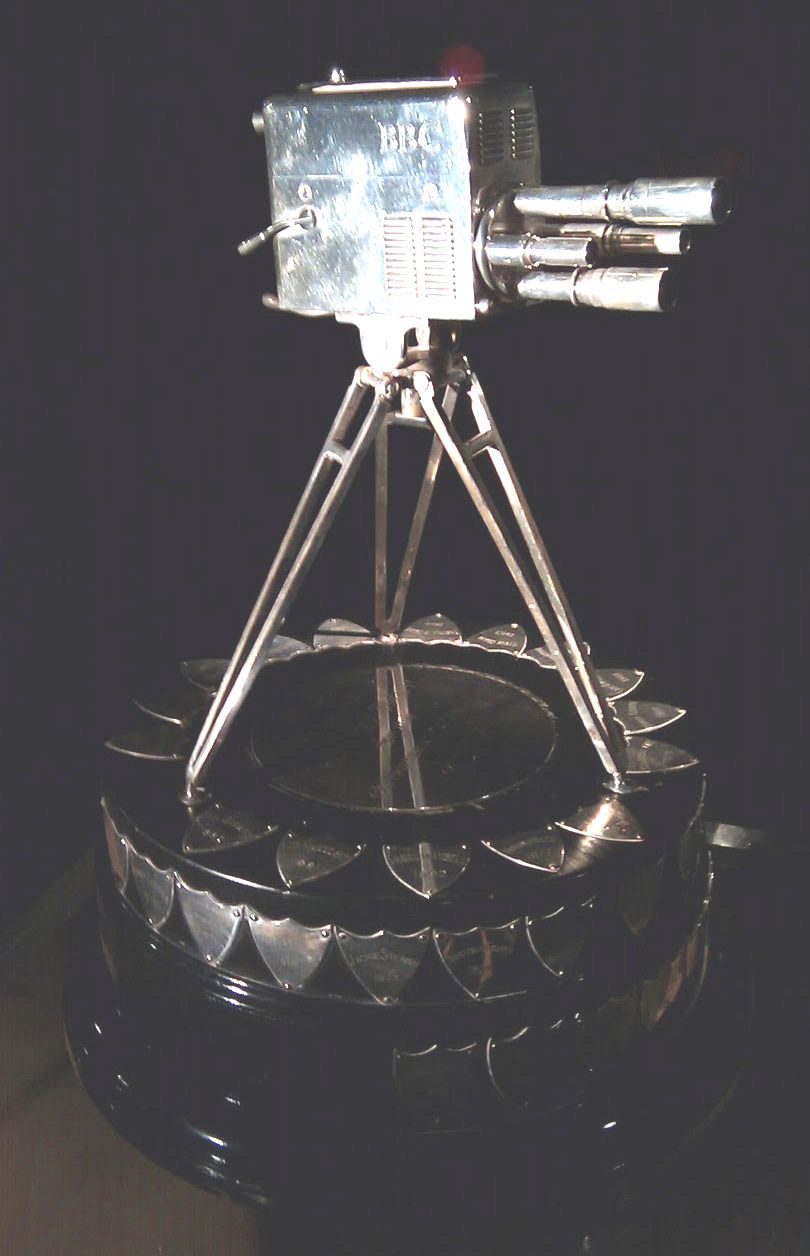
- The trophy for the BBC Sports Personality of the Year Award is a silver four-turret lens camera
- Country: United Kingdom
- Presented by: BBC
- Formerly called: Sports Review of 1954; Sports Review of the Year (1955–1998)
- First award: 1954; 72 years ago
- Website: Official website

The BBC Sports Personality of the Year is an awards ceremony that takes place annually in December. Devised by Paul Fox in 1954, it originally consisted of just a single award of the same name. Several new awards have been introduced, and currently seven awards are presented.

The first awards to be added were the Team of the Year and Overseas Personality awards, which were introduced in 1960. A Lifetime Achievement Award was first given in 1995 and again in 1996, and has been presented annually since 2001. In 1999, three more awards were introduced: the Helen Rollason Award, the Coach Award, and the Newcomer Award, which was renamed to Young Sports Personality of the Year in 2001. The newest is the Unsung Hero Award, presented from 2003 to 2024. In 2003, the 50th anniversary of the show was marked by a five-part series on BBC One called Simply the Best – Sports Personality. It was presented by Gary Lineker and formed part of a public vote to determine a special Golden Sports Personality of the Year. That year Steve Rider and Martyn Smith wrote a book reflecting on the 50-year history of the award and the programme. The event was held outside London for the first time in 2006, when tickets were made available to the public.

The trophy for the main award is a silver-plated four-turret lens camera, and for the other awards smaller imitations of the main trophy are used. All of the BBC local regions hold their own independent award ceremonies, which take place before the main ceremony and are used to compile a shortlist for the BBC Sports Unsung Hero Award.

Other awards have been presented in the past. Special Achievement Awards have been presented on five occasions: to jockey Lester Piggott in 1984 and 1994, disabled marathon runner Dennis Moore in 1981, comedian David Walliams in 2006, and comedian Eddie Izzard in 2009. Sebastian Coe picked up a Special Gold Award in 2005 for his work in helping Britain obtain the right to host the 2012 Olympics.

Five awards have been presented once: Manager of the Year in 1969, a Special Team Award in 1986, Good Sport Awards in 1990, an International Team Award in 1983, and the Sports Personality of the Century Award in 1999. In 2003, to celebrate fifty years of Sports Personality of the Year, two special anniversary awards were created to recognise the best team and Sports Personality from the previous fifty years. Rower Steve Redgrave was voted BBC Golden Sports Personality of the Year and England's 1966 World Cup-winning football team was chosen as Team of the Decades.

BBC Northern Ireland and BBC Wales present a trophy for athletes within their own nations at the same time as the main award, but organised within the region; the Northern Ireland award is conspicuously awarded to athletes whether they represent all of Ireland, Northern Ireland, Great Britain and Northern Ireland or even the Republic of Ireland or Europe (e.g. in golf), so long as they are from Northern Ireland. BBC Scotland ceased presenting their own award in the late 2000s, and England has never had such an award.

== List of given awards ==
Award	Created	Description	Current holder
Sports Personality	1954	Awarded to the sportsperson "whose actions have most captured the public's imagination"	Rory McIlroy
World Sport Star	1960	Awarded to the sportsperson "who has made the greatest impression in the world of sport"	Armand Duplantis
Team	1960	Awarded to the team with the most notable achievement in British sport.	European Ryder Cup team
Lifetime Achievement	1996	Awarded to a sportsperson "who has made a major impact on the world of sport during their lifetime"	Thierry Henry
Coach	1999	Awarded to the coach who is adjudged to have made the most impact on British sport	Sarina Wiegman
Helen Rollason	1999	Awarded to someone who has shown "outstanding achievement in the face of adversity"	Sergio Aguiar; David Stancombe
Young Sports Personality	1999	Awarded to a young sportsperson who has made an outstanding contribution to British sport	Michelle Agyemang
Unsung Hero	2003	Awarded to someone who "has given their time and talents for free to enable others to participate in sport"	Jean Paton

== History ==
Venues
Year(s)	Venue
1954–1956	Savoy Hotel, London
1957–1958	Grosvenor House Hotel, London
1959	BBC Television Theatre, London
1960–1964	BBC Television Centre, London
1965–1976	BBC Television Theatre, London
1977	New London Theatre, London
1978–1987	BBC Television Centre, London
1988–1998	Queen Elizabeth II Conference Centre, London
1999–2005	BBC Television Centre, London
2006–2007	National Exhibition Centre, Birmingham
2008	Echo Arena, Liverpool
2009	Sheffield Arena, Sheffield
2010	LG Arena, Birmingham
2011	dock10 studios, Salford
2012	ExCeL Centre, London
2013	First Direct Arena, Leeds
2014	SSE Hydro, Glasgow
2015	Odyssey Arena, Belfast
2016	Genting Arena, Birmingham
2017	Echo Arena, Liverpool
2018	Resorts World Arena, Birmingham
2019	P&J Live, Aberdeen
2020	dock10 Studios, Salford
2021	dock10 Studios, Salford
2022	dock10 Studios, Salford
2023	dock10 Studios, Salford
2024	dock10 Studios, Salford
2025	dock10 Studios, Salford

Presenters
Presenter	Year(s)
Peter Dimmock	1954–1963
David Coleman	1961–1984
Frank Bough	1964–1982
Harry Carpenter	1968–1985
Jimmy Hill	1970s
Cliff Morgan	1970s
Kenneth Wolstenholme	1970s
Des Lynam	1983–1998
Steve Rider	1986–2004
Sue Barker	1994–2012
Gary Lineker	1999–2023
Clare Balding	1999, 2012–present
John Inverdale	1999
Adrian Chiles	2006–2007
Jake Humphrey	2008–2011
Gabby Logan	2013–present
Alex Scott	2020–present

=== Creation and early years ===
The BBC's Sports Personality of the Year was created by Paul Fox, who came up with the idea while he was editor of the magazine show Sportsview. The first award ceremony took place as part of a special gala edition of Sportsview held at the Savoy Hotel on 30 December 1954. The show lasted 45 minutes and was presented by Peter Dimmock. The ceremony was combined with two other awards, the sportsman and sportswoman of the year, which were determined by votes through the Sporting Record newspaper. The newspaper had presented their sportsman of the year award since 1946, to which they later added a sportswoman of the year award. The award for the 1953 Sporting Record winners had been broadcast on BBC radio in April 1954. Voting for the BBC award was by postcard, and rules presented in a Radio Times article stipulated that nominations were restricted to athletes who had featured on the Sportsview programme since April. For the inaugural BBC Sportsperson of the Year award, 14,517 votes were cast and Christopher Chataway beat fellow athlete Roger Bannister. The following year the show was renamed Sports Review of the Year and given a longer duration of 75 minutes.

The award continued to be held together with the sportsman and sportswoman of the year awards until 1958, by which time the latter awards were being organised by the Daily Express. From 1959 the BBC award ceremony was separated from the sportsman and sportswoman of the year awards.

=== 1960s ===
In 1960 Dimmock presented the show, and introduced two new awards: the Team of the Year award and the Overseas Personality award, won by the Cooper Car Company and athlete Herb Elliott respectively. David Coleman joined the show the following year and remained a co-presenter until 1983. Swimmer Anita Lonsbrough became the first female recipient of the main award in 1962; females won it in the following two years as well. Frank Bough took over as presenter in 1964 and presented Sports Review for 18 years. In 1969, a new Manager of the Year award was given to Don Revie for his achievements with Leeds United, the only occasion it was presented. In the following year boxer Henry Cooper became the first person to win the main award twice, having already won in 1967.

=== 1970s and 1980s ===
During the 1970s Bough and Coleman presided over the ceremony alongside Jimmy Hill, Cliff Morgan, Kenneth Wolstenholme, and Harry Carpenter, who also went on to present the show until 1985. Des Lynam took over as main host from Bough in 1983, and presided over figure skating duo Torvill and Dean's win the following year, when they became the first non-individual winners of the main award. Steve Rider replaced Carpenter as co-host in 1986, at which a Special Team Award was presented to Great Britain men's 4 × 400 m relay team. In the 1980s, Steve Davis finished in the top three on five occasions, including one win in 1988.

=== 1990s ===
In 1991, angler Bob Nudd received the most votes following a campaign in the Angling Times. However, the BBC deemed this to be against the rules and refused to acknowledge his votes, allowing athlete Liz McColgan to win the award. The following year racing driver Nigel Mansell became the second person to win the main award twice, having won his first in 1986. Sue Barker presented the show for the first time in 1994, at which racing driver Damon Hill won the first of his two awards, the second coming two years later. Boxer Frank Bruno was the inaugural winner of the Lifetime Achievement Award in 1996, and as of 2014 there have been 15 recipients of the award.

In 1999 the show was renamed Sports Personality of the Year, and Gary Lineker joined the show as a co-presenter alongside Rider and Barker. They were supported that year by John Inverdale and Clare Balding. The ceremony introduced a further three regular awards: Coach of the Year, Newcomer of the Year, and a Helen Rollason Award for "outstanding courage and achievement in the face of adversity". In a one-off award, boxer Muhammad Ali was voted as the Sports Personality of the Century.

=== 2000s ===
==== 50th anniversary (2003) ====
On 1 November 2003, BBC Books published "BBC Sports Personality of the Year 50th Anniversary" (ISBN 0-563-48747-X), written by Steve Rider and Martyn Smith, to mark the golden anniversary of the show. Leading up to the anniversary show on 14 December 2003, a series of five half-hour special programmes, entitled Simply The Best – Sports Personality, were broadcast. Hosted by Gary Lineker, the episodes were shown on BBC One for five consecutive nights from 8–12 December 2003; each covered one decade of Sports Personality history. At the end of each programme, viewers voted for their favourite Sports Personality winner from the decade covered; the five winners then went onto a shortlist for one of two special 50th Anniversary awards. From this shortlist, rower Steve Redgrave was voted Golden Sports Personality of the Year by the public. The England World Cup-winning team of 1966 won a Team of the Decades award, voted for by representatives from all previous Teams of the Year.

==== 2006–2009 ====
In 2006, for the first time in its 53-year history, the event was held outside London, in Birmingham's National Exhibition Centre (NEC). For the first time, tickets for the event were made available to the public, and 3,000 were sold in the first hour. That year, Adrian Chiles joined the show and co-presented alongside Barker and Lineker for two years. The 2007 ceremony was the first of a two-year sponsorship deal with Britvic's brand Robinsons, and the capacity of the NEC was increased from 5,000 to 8,000. The event sold out, but the sponsorship deal was shortened to one year after complaints by ITV and RadioCentre caused the BBC Trust to rule in June 2008 that "Editorial Guidelines were breached and the editorial integrity of the BBC compromised by giving the impression to licence fee payers via Sports Personality of the Year that part of a BBC service had been sponsored." They decided that the 2008 awards should not be broadcast as a sponsored event, and no new sponsorship deal was negotiated after the Britvic deal expired. In February 2008, the BBC announced that the 2008 Sports Personality of the Year event would be held at the Echo Arena, Liverpool. One reason for the move to Liverpool was to allow greater numbers to view the show live, as the 10,600-seater venue in Liverpool had a bigger capacity than the NEC. That year Jake Humphrey replaced Chiles as co-presenter. The 2009 show was rumoured to be held in either Cardiff or Glasgow. However, it was announced on 30 April 2009 that the show would be staged at the Sheffield Arena, after the city won the hosting rights over Cardiff.

=== 2010s ===
The 2010 ceremony was held in Birmingham's LG Arena with approximately 12,000 guests. The ceremony in 2011 was held at Salford's dock10 Studios within MediaCityUK. The 2012 ceremony took place at ExCeL London, which had been one of the major venues for both the Olympics and Paralympics earlier that year. The 60th ceremony in 2013 was held at the First Direct Arena in Leeds. In 2014, the ceremony was held in Scotland for the first time in its history, at The SSE Hydro in Glasgow, which had served as a host venue during the Commonwealth Games earlier in the year. In 2015, the ceremony was held in Northern Ireland for the first time, at the SSE Arena in Belfast, on 20 December. The event returned to Birmingham and Liverpool in 2016 and 2017 respectively. The 2018 ceremony took place in Birmingham, marking the city's fifth time hosting the event (3rd time at the same venue). In 2018 the BBC Overseas Sports Personality of the Year award was renamed World Sport Star of the Year. Along with the change of name, votes could be cast from outside of the UK for the first time. In addition a new award was announced: Greatest Sporting Moment of the Year. For the main award, the nominees would not be announced until the show itself. The 2019 ceremony took place in The Event Complex in Aberdeen.

=== 2020s ===
The 2020 ceremony took place on 20 December at the dock10 studios in Salford. Despite the national COVID-19 restrictions, the event was broadcast live on BBC One and hosted by Lineker, Balding, Gabby Logan and for the first time, Alex Scott. Boxer Tyson Fury created controversy ahead of the awards by rejecting his nomination and instructing his legal team to force the BBC to exclude him from the shortlist. Despite his protestations, Fury remained on the shortlist for the trophy which was won for the second time by Lewis Hamilton. Also awarded that year was the Expert Panel Special Award, awarded to footballer Marcus Rashford for his campaign against child food poverty.

In May 2024, it was announced that under the BBC's "competitive tender" policy, Whisper North had won the tender to produce the ceremony.

== Trophy ==
The trophy for the main award was created in the 1950s and cost about £1,000. It was first presented to the inaugural winner, Christopher Chataway, in 1954. It is a silver-plated four-turret lens camera, with the name of each winner engraved on individual shields attached to a plinth underneath the camera. The trophy originally had one plinth, but two more were added to create room for more shields. A replica trophy was made in 1981 and sent to India in case Ian Botham won the award while playing cricket there—which he did. The original trophy is still used for the ceremony, and is engraved after the show before being given to the winner, who keeps it for eight or nine months. The trophies for second and third place, and for the other awards, are smaller imitations of the main trophy, but have in the past been silver salvers. For the two special awards celebrating the 50th Anniversary, and for the Sports Personality of the Century award, similar miniature trophies were presented but they were gold in colour.

== Regional and national awards ==
Currently two BBC national regions, BBC Cymru Wales and BBC Northern Ireland, each hold individual sports personality awards. Respectively, they are BBC Cymru Wales Sports Personality of the Year since 1954, and BBC Northern Ireland Sports Personality of the Year since 2003. In 1977, BBC Scotland presented their own equivalent for the first time but this has since been discontinued.

The 12 local BBC English Regions also have their own award ceremonies, which are held locally prior to the national ceremony. Also, fifteen regional winners comprise the nominees for the BBC Sports Unsung Hero Award.

== Intermittent and one-off awards ==
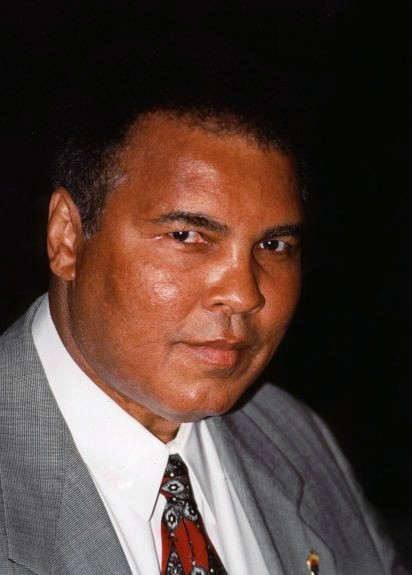
Muhammad Ali was voted Sports Personality of the Century in 1999

=== Manager of the Year ===
In 1969, Don Revie was presented with a Manager of the Year award for his achievements while in charge of Leeds United A.F.C. Leeds became champions of the Football League First Division that season, having lost only two games and scored a record number of points.

Year	Winner	Team	Note
1969	Don Revie	Leeds United A.F.C.	

=== Special Achievement Award ===
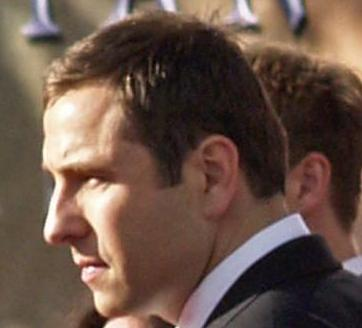
David Walliams won a Special Achievement Award in 2006

In 1981, to recognise the year of the disabled, Dennis Moore received a Special Achievement Award for completing the inaugural London Marathon despite being blind since birth. Lester Piggott won an award in 1984 for his achievements, including winning the St. Leger Stakes on Commanche Run that year, Piggott's record-breaking 28th British classic win. In 1994, Piggott won the award again for his "services to racing". Comedian David Walliams received the award in 2006 "for his outstanding achievement of swimming the English Channel for charity", which raised over £1 million for Sport Relief. Fellow comedian Eddie Izzard was presented with the award in 2009 after running 43 marathons in 51 days for Sport Relief.

Year	Winner	Sport	Note
1981	Dennis Moore	Athletics	
1984	Lester Piggott	Horse racing	
1994	Lester Piggott	Horse racing	
2006	David Walliams	Swimming	
2009	Eddie Izzard	Athletics	

=== International Team Award ===
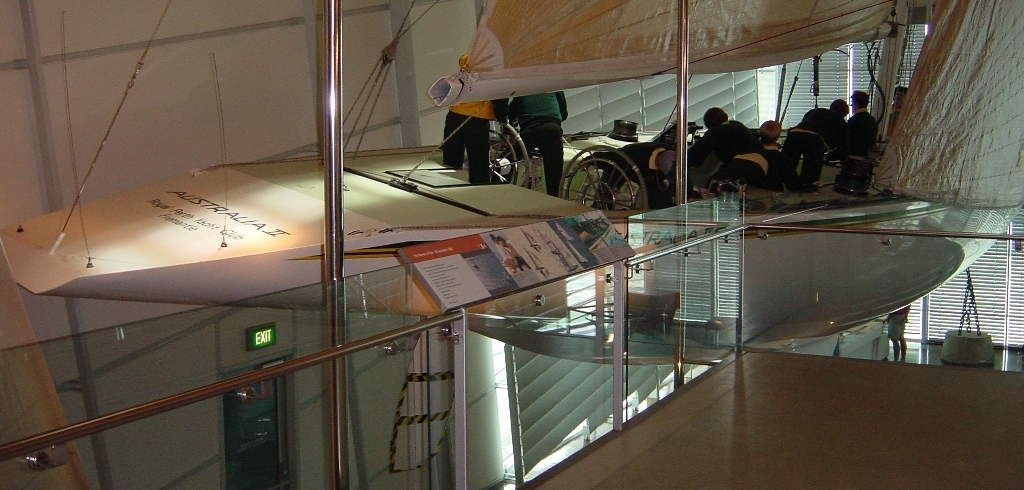
Alan Bond and his crew of Australia II (pictured) received the International Team Award in 1986

In 1983, the team of Australia II received an International Team Award in recognition of their victory in the 1983 America's Cup. The American defender Liberty had taken a 3–1 lead in races, but Australia II came back to win 4–3 and take the America's Cup, ending a 132-year winning streak by the New York Yacht Club. It was the first time the competition had gone to a seventh and final race.

Year	Nat.	Winner	Sport	Note
1983	AUS	Alan Bond and the crew of Australia II	Sailing	

=== Special Team Award ===
In 1986, a Special Team Award was presented to the British 4 × 400 m squad of Derek Redmond, Kriss Akabusi, Brian Whittle, Roger Black, Todd Bennett, and Phil Brown, who won gold at the European Championships. Akabusi, Black, Bennett and Brown also won gold for England in the 4 × 400 m at the Commonwealth Games that year.

Year	Winner	Sport	Note
1986	British Men's 4 × 400 metres relay team	Athletics	

=== Good Sport Awards ===
In 1990, Good Sport Awards were presented for courage and good sportsmanship to Derek Warwick, Martin Donnelly, Louise Aitken-Walker and Tina Thörner, who were all involved in motor racing accidents that year. Warwick survived a high speed crash at Monza; Donnelly crashed during a practice session for the Spanish Grand Prix—the injuries he received ended his Formula One career; Aitken-Walker and co-driver Thörner crashed off a cliff into a lake in Portugal when competing in the women's World Rally Championship, which they went on to win that year.

Year	Winner	Sport	Note
1990	Derek Warwick; Martin Donnelly; Louise Aitken-Walker; Tina Thörner	Motor sport	

=== Sports Personality of the Century Award ===
In 1999, a one-off award voted for by the British public selected a Sports Personality of the Century. Muhammad Ali accumulated more votes from BBC viewers than the combined total of the five other contenders: Pelé, George Best, Donald Bradman, Jack Nicklaus, and Jesse Owens.

=== Special Gold Award ===
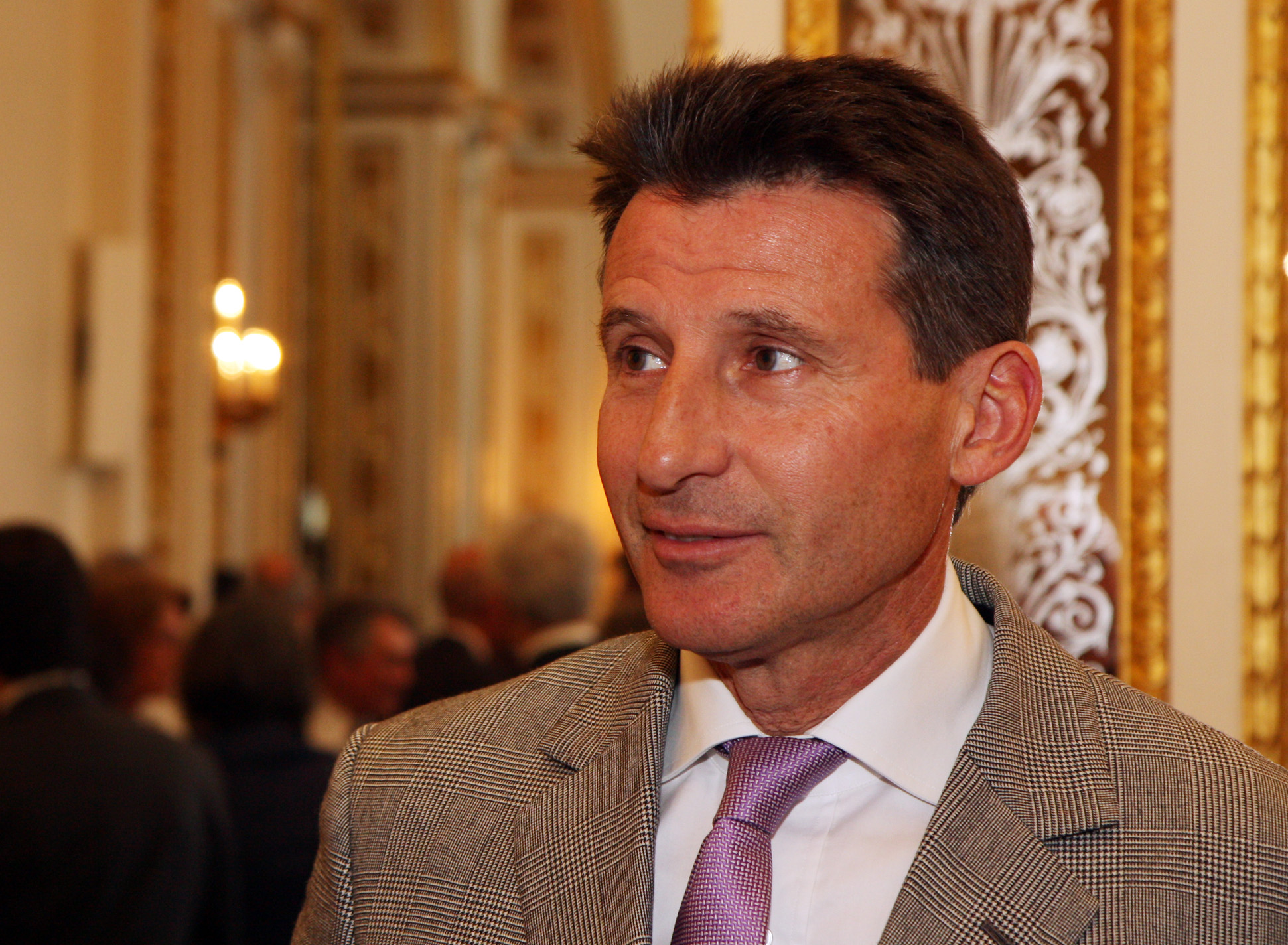
Sebastian Coe won the Special Gold Award in 2005

In 2005, Sebastian Coe received a Special Gold Award for chairing London's winning bid for the 2012 Summer Olympic and Paralympic games.

Year	Winner	Rationale	Note
2005	Sebastian Coe	"in recognition of his role in leading the winning London 2012 Olympic bid"	After the games Coe received the 2012 Lifetime Achievement Award

=== Greatest Sporting Moment of the Year ===
Year	Winner	Rationale	Note
2018	England's historic netball gold	Awarded to the sporting moment that has "most captured the UK public's imagination"	
2019	2019 England Win at the Cricket World Cup Final	Awarded to the sporting moment that has "most captured the UK public's imagination"	

=== Expert Panel Special Award ===
In 2020, Marcus Rashford received an Expert Panel Special Award for his campaign for free school meals during the COVID-19 pandemic and against child food poverty. In 2022, Kevin Sinfield received a Special Award for raising awareness of and fundraising for motor neurone disease.

Year	Winner	Rationale	Note
2020	Marcus Rashford	"for his work to raise awareness of child food poverty in the UK"	
2022	Kevin Sinfield	"for raising awareness of and fundraising for motor neurone disease"	

== 50th Anniversary awards ==
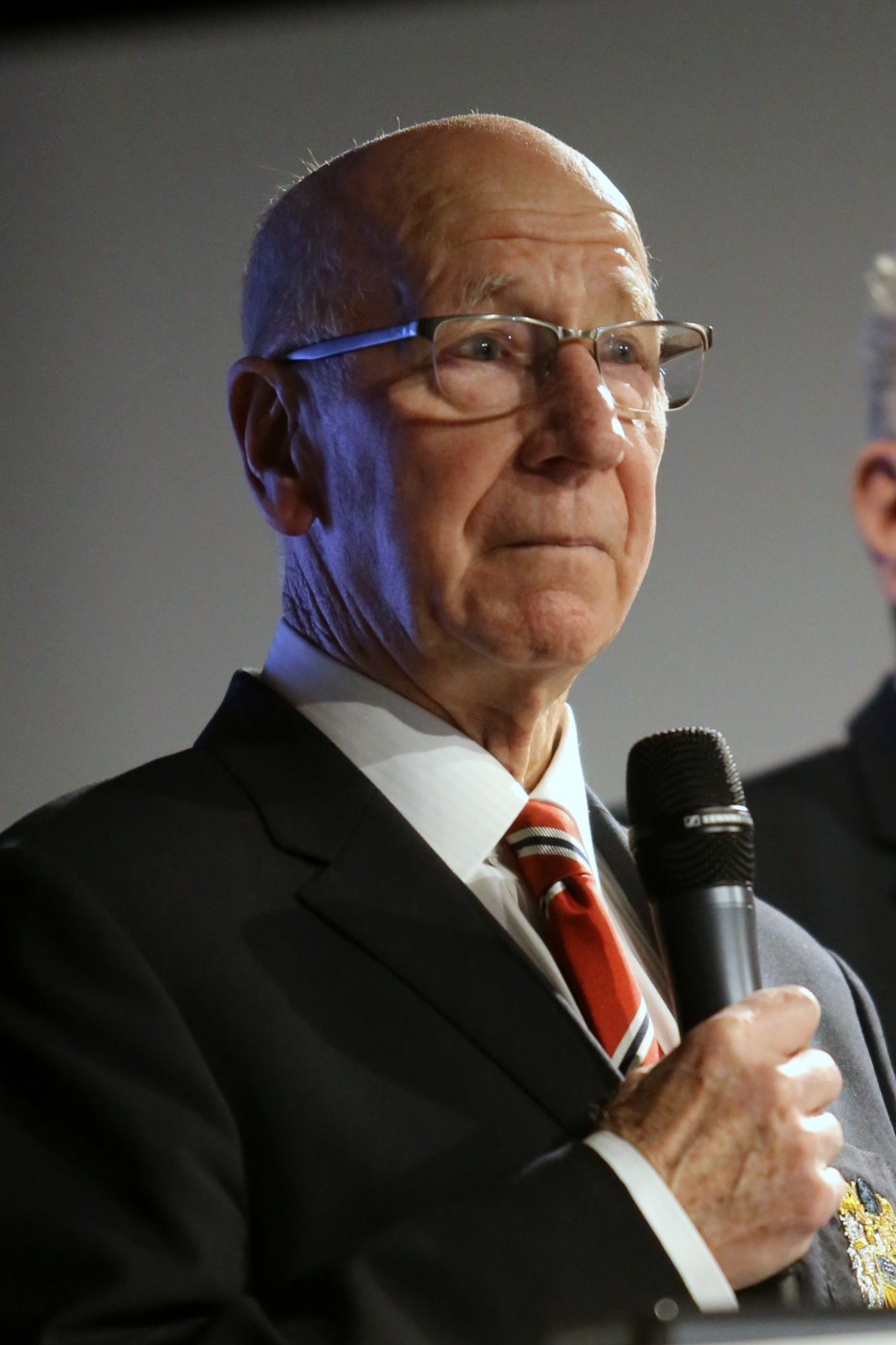
Bobby Charlton, who collected the Team of the Decades award on behalf of England's 1966 World Cup winning football team

As part of the 50th Anniversary of BBC Sports Personality of the Year in 2003, two additional awards were presented. In the lead up to the anniversary show on 14 December 2003, a series of five half-hour special programmes, entitled Simply The Best – Sports Personality, were broadcast. Hosted by Gary Lineker, the episodes were shown on BBC One for five consecutive nights from 8 to 12 December 2003 and each covered one decade of Sports Personality.

=== Golden Sports Personality of the Year ===
To celebrate the golden anniversary of the show, a special award was voted for by the public to recognise an all-time Golden Sports Personality from the previous winners of the last 49 years. A shortlist of five was planned to contain one winner from each decade of the award; however, the actual shortlist contained two winners from the most recent decade—rower Steve Redgrave, who won the award, and footballer David Beckham. The other members of the shortlist were footballer Bobby Moore, cricketer Ian Botham and ice skating duo Torvill and Dean.

Year	Winner	Sport	Note
2003	Steve Redgrave	Rowing	

=== Team of the Decades ===
Alf Ramsey's squad won a poll to select a Team of the Decade for the 50th anniversary show. Representatives from each of the past winners of the Team of the Year award voted for their outstanding team of the last 50 years. Bobby Robson presented the award to Bobby Charlton, who collected the award on behalf of the late Bobby Moore's team.

Year	Winner	Sport	Note
2003	1966 World Cup-winning football team	Football	
