= 2024 BBC Sports Personality of the Year Award =

Sports award in the UK

BBC Sports Personality of the Year 2024
- Date: 17 December 2024
- Location: dock10 studios, Salford
- Country: United Kingdom
- Presented by: BBC
- Hosted by: Clare Balding; Gabby Logan; Alex Scott
- Winner: Keely Hodgkinson
- Website: BBC Sports Personality

Television/radio coverage
- Network: BBC One; BBC One HD

The 2024 BBC Sports Personality of the Year was a sporting awards show which took place on 17 December 2024. Broadcast from Media City in Salford and presented by Clare Balding, Gabby Logan, and Alex Scott, the show was shown live on BBC One.

Gary Lineker, who had presented the annual ceremony since 1999, didn’t return for the 2024 awards. This came following his announcement that he would step down as presenter of Match of the Day.

== Nominees ==
The nominees for the main award, the BBC Sports Personality of the Year Award, were announced on 9 December. Voting took place on 17 December during the show.

The judging panel included athletes Laura Kenny, Iwan Thomas, Ade Adepitan, Nedum Onuoha and Rory Best, broadcaster Eilidh Barbour, The Athletic's Laura Williamson, PA Media's Eleanor Crooks and CEO of Women in Sport, Stephanie Hilborne. From the BBC were Director of Sport, Alex Kay-Jelski, Head of Sport Content, Philip Bernie, and Executive Producer of the Awards, Gabby Cook.

Track and field athlete Keely Hodgkinson won the award, becoming the nineteenth athlete from her sport to win the award. Mo Farah was the last track and field athlete to win back in 2017.

Hodgkinson's followed the wins of Emma Raducanu, Beth Mead and Mary Earps, making this the first time four women had won the prestigious award consecutively.

Luke Littler was the runner-up, a position won by Phil Taylor in 2010, the only other darts player to finish in the top three.

Joe Root finished in third place. His England cricket teammate, Stuart Broad, had finished as runner-up in the previous year.

2023 winner Mary Earps and 2008 winner Sir Chris Hoy presented the awards.

Nominees for the 2024 BBC Sports Personality of the Year Award
Nominee	Sport	2024 Achievement
Keely Hodgkinson	Athletics	At the Olympic Games, Hodgkinson won a gold medal in the 800 metres, Great Britain's first athletics gold since Mo Farah won the 5,000 and 10,000 metres at Rio 2016 and only the tenth British woman to win an Olympic athletics gold. Hodgkinson also retained her gold in the 800 metres at the European Championships.
Luke Littler	Darts	Reaching the final of the PDC World Championship as a 16-year-old qualifier, Littler also won the Premier League Darts, becoming the youngest winner of a major PDC tournament, and the Grand Slam of Darts, his tenth title of the season. He won over £1 million in tournament prize money across the season.
Joe Root	Cricket	In October, Root overtook Alastair Cook to England's leading Test run-scorer. Against Pakistan, Root had a career-best innings of 262 runs and, with Harry Brook, set an England record run partnership of 454 runs. Root is the first player for England to exceed 20,000 runs across all formats, is fifth on the all-time list of Test run scorers and has scored the most Test runs for any country in 2024.
Jude Bellingham	Football	In his debut season, Bellingham scored 23 goals for Real Madrid, winning La Liga and the Champions League. He also scored twice for England at Euro 2024, reaching the final of that tournament. He came third in Ballon d'Or voting, won La Liga Player of the Season, Champions League Young Player of the Season, and Laureus World Sports Award for Breakthrough of the Year.
Sarah Storey	Para-cycling	Storey won the C4-C5 road race and C5 road time trail at the Paralympic Games, bringing her Paralympic gold medal tally to 19 and overall medal tally to 30. She also won the double of C4-C5 road race and C5 road time trail at the Para-cycling Road World Championships for a tenth time, having now won 39 World gold medals in total.
Alex Yee	Triathlon	At the Paris Olympics, Yee won gold in the men's triathlon, overtaking New Zealand's Hayden Wilde in the closing stages, and was part of the Great Britain team which won bronze at the mixed relay. Yee also became World Champion, winning the World Triathlon Championship Series, including event wins in Cagliari and Weihai.

== Other awards ==
=== World Sport Star Award ===
The nominees for the BBC Sports Personality World Sport Star of the Year were announced on 3 December. The public vote opened on the day, and closed on 10 December.

Nominees for the 2024 BBC Sports Personality World Sport Star of the Year
Nationality	Nominee	Sport	2024 Achievement
Sweden	Armand Duplantis	Athletics	Becoming the first man since 1956 to retain an Olympic pole vault title, Duplantis won gold with a world record height. He also won the World Indoor and European titles, as well as winning the Diamond League for a fourth straight year.
United States	Simone Biles	Artistic gymnastics	At the Paris Olympics, Biles won gold in the all-around, team and vault competitions, with a further silver on the floor.
United States	Caitlin Clark	Basketball	In her first year in the Women's National Basketball Association, Clark won Rookie of the Year Award, setting records for points, assists and three pointers in a debut season.
Switzerland	Catherine Debrunner	Para-athletics	The most successful para athletics competitor at the Paris Paralympics, Debrunner won five golds in the 400m T53, 800m T53, 1500m T54, 5000m T54 and marathon T54, with a silver in the 100m T53. Additionally, she won the London Marathon, retained the Berlin Marathon and won the Chicago Marathon in a record time to win a second successive World Marathon Majors.
Netherlands	Sifan Hassan	Athletics	At the Paris Olympics, Hassan won the marathon with a sprint finish, as well as bronzes in both the 5000m and the 10,000m, becoming the first athlete in 72 years to win medals in all three events at the same games.
France	Léon Marchand	Swimming	The poster boy of the Paris Olympics, Marchand won more golds than any other athlete at the games, with golds in the 200m breaststroke, 200m butterfly, 200m individual medley and 400m individual medley.

=== Young Sports Personality of the Year ===
On 5 December 2024, the shortlist of three for the BBC Young Sports Personality of the Year was announced. The shortlist was whittled down from ten athletes, which also contained snowboarder Mia Brookes, cyclist Cat Ferguson, middle-distance runner Phoebe Gill, gymnast Abigail Martin, footballer Ethan Nwaneri, para-table tennis player Bly Twomey and para-swimmer Iona Winnifrith. The judging panel included wheelchair racer Sammi Kinghorn, BMX-er Kieran Reilly, BBC Sport presenter Qasa Alom, Radio 1 presenter Jeremiah Asiamah and representatives from the Youth Sport Trust, Blue Peter and BBC Sport.

Former winner of the award Harry Aikines-Aryeetey was joined by his Gladiators co-star Jodie Ounsley to present the award.

Nominees for the 2024 BBC Young Sports Personality of the Year
Nominee	Sport	2024 Achievements
Luke Littler	Darts	On a fairytale run to the PDC World Darts Championship final, Littler broke a host of records and went on to win the Premier League Darts title and the Grand Slam of Darts, the latter taking him to over ten titles in a single series.
Sky Brown	Skateboarding	Brown became a double Olympic medallist, winning a bronze medal, despite tearing a knee ligament and dislocating a shoulder in the run up to the Paris Olympics.
William Ellard	Para swimming	At the Paris Paralympics, Ellard won golds in the 200m free S14 and mixed 4 × 100 m free relay S14, winning the former in a world record time. In addition, a silver came in the 100m butterfly S14 and he won two golds, a silver and a bronze at the European Championships.

=== Helen Rollason Award ===
The Helen Rollason Award was presented to Mark Prince. The former boxer won the award in recognition for his work at the Kiyan Prince Foundation, a charity he founded in memory of his son, that uses boxing to deter people from getting involved in knife crime.

Boxer and 1985 winner of the BBC Sports Personality of the Year Award Barry McGuigan presented Prince with the award.

=== Team of the Year ===
The Team of the Year Award went to Wigan R.L.F.C. for their domination of the 2024 season, winning every trophy that was available to them including the World Club Challenge, Challenge Cup, League Leader's Shield and the Grand Final. They achieve this feat for the second time, having previously won the quadruple in 1994, a year in which they also won BBC Sports Team of the Year.

Rugby player Martin Offiah and swimmer Ellie Simmonds handed over the trophy.

=== Coach of the Year ===
The Coach of the Year Award was presented to athletics coaches Jenny Meadows and Trevor Painter for guiding Keely Hodgkinson to the 800m gold medal at the 2024 Paris Olympics. Under their direction, she also retained her title at the 2024 European Athletics Championships and became the sixth-fastest woman in history with a new British record of 54.61 seconds. Meadows' and Painter's track club also produced two further medals in Paris, a bronze for Georgia Bell in the 1500m and a bronze for Lewis Davey as part of the men's 4x400m relay team.

The trophy was presented by fellow track and field athletes Dame Jessica Ennis-Hill and Dame Kelly Holmes.

=== Unsung Hero Award ===
The winners from the BBC's twelve English regions, Northern Ireland, Scotland and Wales were announced on 12 December 2024. The overall winner of the BBC Sports Unsung Hero Award was announced on the night. The Unsung Hero Award celebrates the volunteers who "make a positive impact on their community by enabling participation in grassroots sports, bringing people together with a shared passion for sport." The 2024 award went to Jean Patton for her decades of work as a volunteer and instructor at Salterns Sailing Club in Lymington.

Cyclist Dame Laura Kenny and presenter Paddy McGuinness presented the award.

=== Lifetime Achievement Award ===
On 16 December 2024, it was announced that Sir Mark Cavendish had been awarded the Lifetime Achievement Award. This was for his cycling career, where he achieved a record breaking 35 stage wins at the Tour de France alongside 17 at the Giro d'Italia and three at the Vuelta a Espana. He also won the road race at the 2011 World Championship.

Cavendish's fellow cyclist Sir Bradley Wiggins presented him with the trophy.

== In Memoriam ==
- George Baldock
- Sol Bamba
- Kevin Campbell
- Sven-Goran Eriksson
- Franz Beckenbauer
- Andreas Brehme
- Salvatore Schillaci
- Willie Limond
- John Anderson
- Leslie Watson
- Anne Ebbs
- Will Arnott
- James Rawson
- Judy Hashman
- Peter Oosterhuis
- Alan Mills
- Keith Hepworth
- Brian Lockwood
- Lewis Jones
- Malcolm Price
- Courtenay Meredith
- Derrick Grant
- J. P. R. Williams
- Barry John
- Mike Dickson
- Alastair Down
- Bill Arthur
- Tony Green
- Ray Reardon
- Clive Everton
- Terry Griffiths
- Paul Dickenson
- Kelvin Kiptum
- Rebecca Cheptegei
- Raman Subba Row
- Tom Voyce
- Penny Chuter
- Patsy Lovell
- Stan Bowles
- Gary Shaw
- Larry Lloyd
- Ron Yeats
- Peter Cormack
- Ian McMillan
- Craig Shakespeare
- Joe Kinnear
- Chris Nicholl
- David Wilkie
- Claire Lomas
- Lord Ouseley
- Georgie Campbell
- Mark Bradstock
- Mike Procter
- Josh Baker
- Derek Underwood
- Graham Thorpe
- Oscar Fairs
- Willie Mays
- Jerry West
- Leighton James
- Matija Sarkic
- Terry Medwin
- Anthony O’Reilly
- Jack Rowell
- Ronnie Dawson
- Geoff Capes
- Rob Burrow
