= 2011 BBC Sports Personality of the Year Award =

Sports award in the UK

- Date: 22 December 2011
- Location: dock10 studios, Salford
- Country: United Kingdom
- Presented by: British Broadcasting Corporation (BBC)
- Hosted by: Sue Barker; Gary Lineker; Jake Humphrey
- Winner: Mark Cavendish
- Website: BBC Sports Personality

Television/radio coverage
- Network: BBC One; BBC One HD
- Runtime: 120 minutes

The 2011 BBC Sports Personality of the Year Award took place on 22 December 2011 at the dock10 studios in Salford. It was the 58th presentation of the BBC Sports Personality of the Year Award. Awarded annually by the British Broadcasting Corporation (BBC), the main titular award honours an individual's British sporting achievement over the past year, with the winner selected by public vote from a ten-person shortlist. Other awards presented include team, coach, and young personality of the year.

The event, broadcast live on BBC One, was hosted by Sue Barker, Gary Lineker and Jake Humphrey.

Cyclist Mark Cavendish won the main award, with golfer Darren Clarke the runner-up and long-distance runner Mo Farah in third place.

== Award process ==
The shortlist of ten sportspeople, which was drawn up by "a range of sports experts from newspapers and magazines across the UK", was announced on 29 November 2011. The shortlist was widely criticised for its lack of any female competitors. On 14 December, the British Olympic Association said that they were considering a boycott of the award ceremony in protest. The BOA chief executive, Andy Hunt, said that he would have included swimmers Keri-Anne Payne and Rebecca Adlington, rower Katherine Grainger, and England women's cricket captain, Charlotte Edwards, in his top 10. The BBC said that it would review the nomination procedure for the 2012 awards.

The award ceremony was held on Thursday 22 December at the dock10 in Salford, and was broadcast live on BBC One.

== Nominees ==
The ten nominees saw three nominees from the world of golf, two each from the worlds of athletics, and cricket, and one each from boxing, cycling, and tennis.

Mark Cavendish won the award with 49.47% of the vote. Darren Clarke was the runner-up with 12.34%, and Mo Farah took third place with 8.71% of the vote. Cavendish was the third cyclist to win the award after Tom Simpson in 1965, and Chris Hoy in 2008. Additionally, Cavendish became the first winner from the Isle of Man. Clarke had been runner-up in 2006, a feat he managed to repeated this time around. The last golfer to win the award was Nick Faldo in 1989. Farah's fellow athlete Jessica Ennis finished third in the previous two competitions, whilst Dame Kelly Holmes was the last track and field athlete to win the award.

Bobby Charlton and Tanni Grey-Thompson presented the awards.

Nominee	Sport	2011 achievement	BBC Profile	Votes (percentage)
Mark Cavendish	Cycling	Britain's first winner of the points classification in the Tour de France; also won the world road race, the first British male champion to do so for 46 years.		169,152 (49.47%)
Darren Clarke	Golf	Won the 2011 Open Championship at the age of 42, becoming the oldest winner of the event since Roberto De Vicenzo in 1967.		42,188 (12.34%)
Mo Farah	Athletics	Won a gold medal in the 5,000m and a silver medal in the 10,000m at the World Championships.		29,780 (8.71%)
Luke Donald	Golf	Won the BMW PGA Championship at Wentworth and became the world's number one golfer.		23,854 (6.98%)
Andy Murray	Tennis	Won five titles and reached third place in the world rankings.		18,754 (5.48%)
Andrew Strauss	Cricket	Led England to victory in the Ashes on the way to becoming the number one Test team in the world.		17,994 (5.26%)
Alastair Cook	Cricket	Won the Ashes in Australia, as the highest run scorer and whitewashed India, 4–0, to become the number one test nation.		13,038 (3.81%)
Rory McIlroy	Golf	Became the youngest U.S. Open champion since 1923		11,915 (3.48%)
Dai Greene	Athletics	Won a gold medal in the 400m hurdles at the World Championships.		9,022 (2.64%)
Amir Khan	Boxing	Defeated Zab Judah in the light-welterweight unification fight in Las Vegas.		6,262 (1.83%)

== Other awards ==
In addition to the main award as "Sports Personality of the Year", several other awards were also announced:

- Team of the Year: England cricket team
- Coach of the Year: Andy Flower
- Overseas Personality: Novak Djokovic
- Young Personality: Lauren Taylor (Golf)
- Unsung Hero Award: Janice Eaglesham and Ian Mirfin (Athletics coaches)
- Lifetime Achievement: Steve Redgrave
- Helen Rollason Award: Bob Champion

== In Memoriam ==
- Severiano Ballesteros
- Jimmy Adamson
- Peter Roebuck
- Alec Weekes
- Michael Jarvis
- Sócrates
- Betty Callaway
- Alex Hay
- Richard Butcher
- Len Killeen
- Ted Lowe
- Samuel Wanjiru
- Neil Young
- Nat Lofthouse
- Dan Wheldon
- Eddie Turnbull
- Joe Frazier
- Fred Titmus
- Marco Simoncelli
- Gary Mason
- Graham Dilley
- Mike Doyle
- Trevor Bailey
- Ginger McCain
- Grete Waitz
- Martin Webster
- Dean Richards
- Basil D'Oliveira
- Henry Cooper
- Gary Speed
