= 2023 BBC Sports Personality of the Year Award =

Sports award in the UK

BBC Sports Personality of the Year 2023
- Date: 19 December 2023
- Location: dock10 studios, Salford
- Country: United Kingdom
- Presented by: BBC
- Hosted by: Gary Lineker; Clare Balding; Gabby Logan; Alex Scott
- Winner: Mary Earps
- Website: BBC Sports Personality

Television/radio coverage
- Network: BBC One; BBC One HD

The 2023 BBC Sports Personality of the Year was a sporting awards show and took place on 19 December 2023. Broadcast from Media City in Salford and presented by Gary Lineker, Clare Balding, Gabby Logan, and Alex Scott, the show was shown live on BBC One. During the show, seventy years of the awards will be celebrated.

Mary Earps won the BBC Sports Personality of the Year Award, becoming the first football goalkeeper to do so. Cricketer Stuart Broad was runner-up, with heptathlete Katarina Johnson-Thompson in third place. The BBC does not reveal voting statistics for this programme or award.

== Nominees ==
On 12 December, the nominees for the main award were announced live on BBC Breakfast.

The judging panel consisted of athletes Ellen White, Colin Jackson, Ellie Simmonds, Chris Paterson, sports journalists David Coverdale from the Daily Mail, Rob Maul from The Sun, Charlotte Harpur from The Athletic, chair of UK Sport Dame Katherine Grainger, sports broadcaster Holly Hamilton and, from BBC Sport, Director of Sport Barbara Slater, Head of Sport Content Philip Bernie, and Executive Producer of the Awards Gabby Cook.

Mary Earps won the award, becoming the seventh footballer, and the first goalkeeper to win the award. She also became the second female footballer, following in the footsteps of her teammate Beth Mead, who won the award in 2022.

With Emma Raducanu's win in 2021, it also meant that the award was won by three consecutive females, for the first time since the 1960s, when Anita Lonsbrough, Dorothy Hyman and Mary Rand won it in consecutive years.

Stuart Broad's second-place finish followed his teammate Ben Stokes, who had finished in the same position in the previous year.

Katarina Johnson-Thompson was the first track and field athlete to reach the top three since Dina Asher-Smith in 2019, and the first heptathlete since Jessica Ennis-Hill in 2015.

1984 winners Jayne Torvill and Christopher Dean presented the trophies to the winners.

| Nominee | Sport | 2023 Achievements |
|---|---|---|
| Mary Earps | Football | Playing every minute at the World Cup, she won the Golden Glove award for three clean sheets and only conceding four goals across the tournament. She was also integral to England's win in the Finalissima and claimed the WSL Golden Glove for her season with Manchester United. |
| Stuart Broad | Cricket | Scored a six from the last ball he faced in Test cricket, and took the final wicket of the match with his last delivery in Test cricket (his final cricket match), to win the Fifth Test of the Ashes series against Australia. With 22 wickets in the series, he became the highest wicket-taker against Australia, finishing his career with 604 Test wickets, placing him fifth on the record list. |
| Katarina Johnson-Thompson | Athletics | Regained the World Champion title in Budapest. Having started the second day of the competition behind, she secured PBs in the final two events of the javelin and 800m, to secure victory by just 20 points. |
| Frankie Dettori | Horse racing | Won two classics, the 2000 Guineas and the Epsom Oaks. Also won the Gold Cup at Royal Ascot and the Coronation Cup at Epsom. On his final racing day of his career in Britain at Ascot, he won the opening race and finished his career with victory in the Champion Stakes. |
| Alfie Hewett | Wheelchair tennis | Won the Australian Open and US Open, only just missing out on the Wimbledon title. Also won the Wheelchair Masters to finish the year as World Number One. In the doubles, he and Gordon Reid added the Australian, French and Wimbledon titles to their haul. |
| Rory McIlroy | Golf | Won four of his five matches to help Europe regain the Ryder Cup, a fifth victory in the competition for McIlroy. On the PGA Tour, he posted thirteen top ten finishes, including at three majors. He also won the Scottish Open and the Race to Dubai title. |

== Other awards ==
=== Young Sports Personality of the Year ===
On 1 December 2023, the three-person shortlist for the BBC Young Sports Personality of the Year was announced on Blue Peter. The shortlist of three was whittled down from a group of ten, which also included skateboarder Sky Brown, footballer Ben Doak, cyclist Cat Ferguson, gymnast Jack Jacobs, swimmer Poppy Maskill, climber Toby Roberts, and artistic swimmer Ranjuo Tomblin. The judging panel included former winners Theo Walcott, Andrea Spendolini-Sirieix and Harry Aikines-Aryeetey, rower Lauren Rowles, a Blue Peter badge winner, and representatives from BBC Sport, Youth Sports Trust and Blue Peter.

Former winner Ellie Simmonds and footballer Leah Williamson presented the award.

Winner and Nominees of the 2023 BBC Young Sports Personality of the Year Award
| Nominee | Sport | 2023 Achievements |
|---|---|---|
| Mia Brookes | Snowboarding | Became the youngest ever Snowboard World Champion at the Bakuriani World Championships, also becoming the first Brit to win a snowboard slopestyle world title. She also became the first woman to land a Cab 1440 in a competition. |
| Penny Healey | Archery | Spent much of the year as World Number One, in a year which saw her win gold in the World Cup, the European Grand Prix and at the European Games in both the individual and team events. |
| Charlie McIntyre | Wheelchair Basketball | Led GB U22 to undefeated victory in a Home Nations competition, whilst with London Titans, he won the British Premier League and played in the Eurocup, making the 'All-Star5' on three separate occasions. |

=== Unsung Hero Award ===
The Unsung Hero Award rewards volunteers in the local community for their work in sport's grassroots. In 7th December, the fifteen regional winners were announced.

Des Smith, who founded Sheffield Caribbean Sports Club to provide sporting opportunities for ethnic minorities and encourage community cohesion, was the overall winner. Cricketer James Anderson and athlete Dame Denise Lewis presented the award.

=== Helen Rollason Award ===
The Helen Rollason Award was presented to Fatima Whitbread. The javelin champion won the award for her campaigning for children and those in the care system, after she spent the first fourteen years of her life in a children's home. Lady Mary Peters and Colin Jackson presented Whitbread, who received a standing ovation, with the award.

=== World Sport Star Award ===
On 5 December, the six-person shortlist for the BBC Sports Personality World Sport Star of the Year Award was announced. The public vote opened on the same day, closing a week later on 12 December.

Haaland was away playing with Manchester City and so sent a recorded message to accept the award.

Winner and Nominees of the 2023 BBC Sports Personality World Sport Star of the Year
| Nationality | Nominee | Sport | 2023 Achievement |
|---|---|---|---|
| Norway | Erling Haaland | Football | With his goals, Manchester City won the treble, in a season where Haaland won the Premier League Golden Boot and Player of the Season, as well as the UEFA Men's Player of the Year Award and the Gerd Müller Trophy for best goalscorer. |
| United States | Simone Biles | Gymnastics | Returning to competition after a two-year break, Biles won gold on the beam, floor, in the all-around, and as part of the team at the World Artistic Gymnastics Championships. She also won a record eighth US Gymnastics title. |
| Spain | Aitana Bonmatí | Football | At the World Cup, Bonmati scored three times to help Spain to victory, securing her the Player of the Tournament Award. With Barcelona, won Liga F and the Champions League, as well as the Ballon d'Or Féminin and the UEFA Player of the Year Award. |
| Serbia | Novak Djokovic | Tennis | Won the Australian, French and US Opens to become the first man to complete a triple Career Grand Slam and equalling Margaret Court's all-time record of 24 major titles. |
| South Africa | Siya Kolisi | Rugby union | Led his country to a fourth World Cup victory, completing successive victories. Kolisi had just recovered from a knee injury in time to play in the tournament. |
| Netherlands | Max Verstappen | Formula One | Became a triple World Champion, becoming the fifth driver to retain his title. Verstappen broke the record for the most races won in a season, as well as having the largest margin of victory in history. |

=== Lifetime Achievement Award ===
On 17th December, it was announced that Kenny Dalglish had been awarded the Lifetime Achievement Award. This was for his playing and managing career, where he achieved success at Celtic F.C., Liverpool F.C. and Blackburn Rovers F.C., representing Scotland at multiple World Cups, raising money with his wife Marina for a variety of charities and leading the club and the city following the Hillsborough disaster.

Dalglish was greeted on stage by his family and former teammates and players, including Alan Hansen who presented Dalglish with the award.

=== Team of the Year and Coach of the Year ===
Both the Team of the Year Award and Coach of the Year Award marked Manchester City's treble, where they won the FA Cup, Premier League and Champions League. Kyle Walker accepted the award on behalf of the team in a pre-recorded message, whilst Pep Guardiola accepted his award in the same manner because the team were playing away.

== In Memoriam ==
- Bobby Charlton, Football
- John Motson, Broadcasting
- Trevor Francis, Football
- Just Fontaine, Football
- Gianluca Vialli, Football
- Vera Selby, Snooker
- Allan Jay, Fencing
- Tony Doyle, Cycling
- David Watkins, Rugby League & Union
- Peter Dixon, Rugby Union
- Bev Risman, Rugby League & Union
- Craig Brown, Football
- Gordon McQueen, Football
- Ronnie McKinnon, Football
- Anthony Hughes, Disability Sport
- Baroness Masham, Disability Sport
- Gillian Matthews, Disability Sport
- Tori Bowie, Athletics
- John Nuttall, Athletics
- Jim Hines, Athletics
- Dick Fosbury, Athletics
- Clive Rowlands, Rugby Union
- Ken Scotland, Rugby Union
- Brian Price, Rugby Union
- David Duckham, Rugby Union
- Maddy Cusack, Football
- Chris Bart-Williams, Football
- Christian Atsu, Football
- Michael Parkinson, Broadcasting
- Dickie Davies, Broadcasting
- Robert Alun Evans, Broadcasting
- Ann Cutcliffe, Para Equestrian
- Edward Hide, Horse Racing
- Jim Lewis, Horse Racing
- Michael Bonallack, Golf
- Barry Lane, Golf
- Ivor Robson, Golf
- Dale Reid, Golf
- Ken Buchanan, Boxing
- Hugh Russell, Boxing
- Jim Brown, American Football
- Bishan Singh Bedi, Cricket
- David Gold, Football
- Mohamed Al-Fayed, Football
- Bill Kenwright, Football
- Peter Matthews, Broadcasting
- Mat Wayne, Broadcasting
- Jamie Strickland, Journalism
- Helen Smart, Swimming
- Mike McFarlane, Athletics
- Jim Fox, Modern Pentathlon
- Syd Millar, Rugby Union
- Adam Johnson, Ice Hockey
- Bernard Ford, Ice Skating
- Francis Lee, Football
- Ronnie Rees, Football
- John Hollins, Football
- Terry Venables, Football
