= 2019 BBC Sports Personality of the Year Award =

Sports award in the UK

BBC Sports Personality of the Year
- Date: 15 December 2019
- Location: P&J Live, Aberdeen
- Country: United Kingdom
- Presented by: BBC
- Hosted by: Gary Lineker; Clare Balding; Gabby Logan
- Winner: Ben Stokes
- Website: BBC Sports Personality

Television/radio coverage
- Network: BBC One; BBC One HD; BBC Radio 5 Live

The BBC Sports Personality of the Year 2019 took place on 15 December 2019 at the P&J Live in Aberdeen.

The event was broadcast live on BBC One, and hosted by Gary Lineker, Clare Balding and Gabby Logan. Lewis Capaldi performed "Hold Me While You Wait" and "Someone You Loved" during the memorial to those sportspeople who died in the past year and Emeli Sandé performed "Shine" to commemorate the 2019 FIFA Women's World Cup in France.

== Nominees ==
The nominees for the award were revealed on 25 November 2019. On the night of the final, the public were allowed to vote for one of only six contenders pre-selected by "an expert independent panel".

The winner of this award was Ben Stokes with Lewis Hamilton in second and Dina Asher-Smith in third.

Nominee	Sport	2019 Achievement
Ben Stokes	Cricket	Helped England win the Cricket World Cup for the first time with a dramatic super-over victory against New Zealand in the final at Lord's and was named man of the match. Also scored 135 not out to lead England to an unlikely one-wicket win in the third Ashes Test match at Headingley.
Lewis Hamilton	Formula 1	Became just the second driver (after Michael Schumacher) to win a sixth World Drivers' Championship.
Dina Asher-Smith	Athletics	Won 200 metres gold at the World Athletics Championships with a British record, making her the first British woman to win a global sprint title. Also picked up silver medals in the 100 metres (with a British record also) and 4 × 100 metres relay.
Raheem Sterling	Football	Helped Manchester City win the domestic treble of Premier League, FA Cup and League Cup titles. Also named as Football Writers' Association Footballer of the Year.
Alun Wyn Jones	Rugby union	Captained Wales to Grand Slam victory in the Six Nations and was named player of the championship. Also became Wales' most capped international player during the Rugby World Cup.
Katarina Johnson-Thompson	Athletics	Won heptathlon gold at the World Athletics Championships with a British record and the highest championship score since 2007.

== Other awards ==
In addition to the main award as "Sports Personality of the Year", several other awards were also presented:

- Overseas Personality: Eliud Kipchoge
- Team of the Year: England cricket team
- Lifetime Achievement: Tanni Grey-Thompson
- Coach of the Year: John Blackie
- Young Personality: Caroline Dubois
- Unsung Hero Award: Keiren Thompson

== In Memoriam ==
- Gordon Banks
- Billy McNeill Stevie Chalmers
- Peter Snell Harrison Dillard Ken Matthews
- Gordon Brand Jnr Brian Barnes
- Jose Antonio Reyes Justin Edinburgh Fernando Ricksen
- Alfie Linehan Abdul Qadir Malcolm Nash
- Craig Fallon Iona Sclater Con de Lange
- John McCririck Ferdy Murphy
- Pernell Whitaker Saeideh Aletaha Patrick Day
- Emiliano Sala David Ibbotson
- Jordan Dawes Jerry Thompson Kat Lindner
- Micky Steele-Bodger Garfield Owen Austin Rhodes
- Chester Williams
- Niki Lauda
- Anthoine Hubert Charlie Whiting
- Tommy Smith Brian Mawhinney Peter Thompson
- Olly Croft Mike Watterson Paul Hutchins
- Jake Burton Carpenter Stuart Fitzsimmons Matti Nykanen
- Jean Stone Peter Carruthers Marieke Vervoort
- Ron Saunders Bill Slater Jim Smith
- Archie Bruce Peter Fox Natalie Harrowell
- Vikki Orvice Hugh McIlvanney Dianne Oxberry
- Bob Willis
