= Lauren Taylor (golfer) =

English golfer (born 1994)

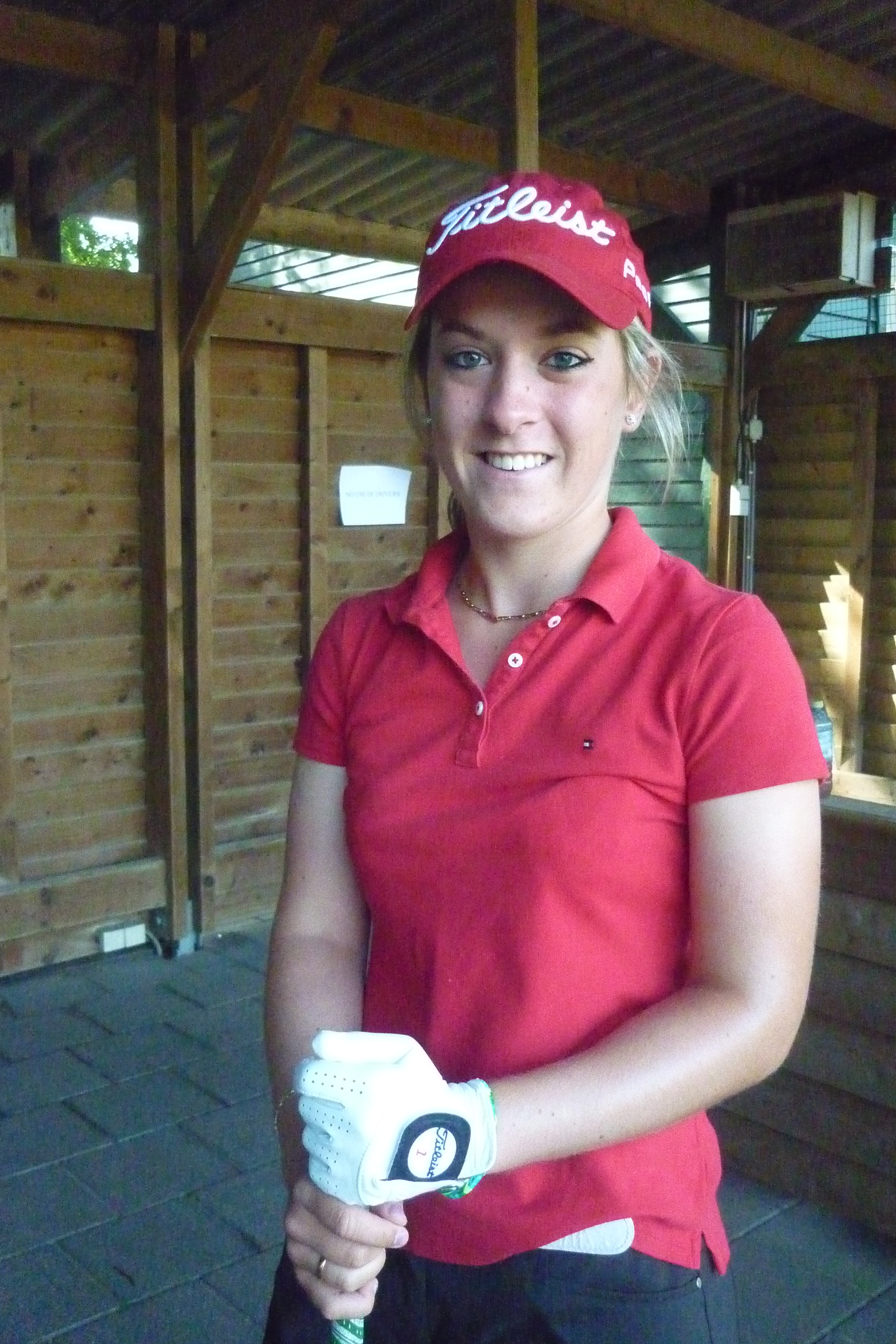

Personal information
- Full name: Lauren Abbie Taylor
- Nickname: Lozza
- Nationality: England
- Born: 26 August 1994 (age 32) Coventry, England
- Height: 5 ft 5 in (1.65 m)

Career
- Sport: Golf
- College: Baylor University
- Turned professional: 2013
- Current tour: Ladies European Tour (joined 2014)
- Former tour: LET Access Series
- Professional wins: 1

Best results in LPGA major championships
- Chevron Championship: DNP
- Women's PGA C'ship: DNP
- U.S. Women's Open: CUT: 2015
- Women's British Open: CUT: 2011, 2014
- Evian Championship: DNP

Achievements and awards
- BBC Young Sports Personality of the Year: 2011

Lauren Abbie Taylor (born 26 August 1994) is an English professional golfer and Ladies European Tour player. She won The Women's Amateur Championship in 2011.

== Early life and amateur career ==
Taylor was born and raised in Rugby. Her younger sister Charlotte also plays golf successfully.

She attended Ashlawn School, won the English Girls Under 15's title in 2008. She won the Dutch Junior Championships 2011 and 2012 and was given a wildcard for the Dutch Ladies Open on both occasions. She received sponsors' invitations to the Ladies European Tour Slovak Ladies Open in 2012, having qualified for the same event in 2011. During the 2011 event, she recorded two consecutive eagles on the par-5 4th hole and par-3 5th hole at Gray Bear Golf Club.

Taylor became the youngest winner of the British Ladies Amateur in 2011, at the age of 16. As a result, she was originally offered a place in the 2012 U.S. Women's Open, but the invitation was later withdrawn in favour of the 2012 British Amateur champion.

Taylor played college golf at Baylor University, having previously played for Woburn Golf Club.

== Professional career ==
Taylor turned professional in September 2013 and won her first tournament as a professional, the Norrporten Ladies Open, on the LET Access Series. In 2014, she joined the Ladies European Tour.

== Awards and honors ==
In 2011, Taylor won the BBC Young Sports Personality of the Year.

== Amateur wins ==
- 2008 English Girls Championship
- 2011 Dutch Junior Championship, British Ladies Amateur
- 2012 Dutch Junior Championship

== Professional wins ==
=== LET Access Series wins (1) ===
No.	Date	Tournament	Winning score	Margin of victory	Runner-up
1	1 Sep 2013	Norrporten Ladies Open	–2 (73-72-72=217)	1 stroke	(Netherlands) Chrisje De Vries

== Team appearances ==
Amateur

- Junior Solheim Cup (representing Europe): 2011
