= Qasa Alom =

British journalist, radio and television presenter

- Born: Birmingham, England
- Education: King Edward VI Aston School
- Occupations: Journalist and presenter
- Employer: BBC

Qasa Alom is a British journalist, radio and television presenter, and documentary film-maker.

== Early life ==
Alom was born in Birmingham to a British-Bangladeshi family. His father is called Saiful, and his mother is called Ratna. He attended King Edward VI Aston School and speaks five languages.

== Career ==
Alom joined the BBC in 2010, starting in local radio. He made a Radio 4 series about Stoke-on-Trent's illegal sex trade for which he won a Frank Gillard Award in 2013. He progressed to be a Midlands Today television newsreader. He made his debut on BBC1 in a half-hour documentary about J. R. R. Tolkien entitled Books That Made Britain: Factories to Middle Earth in 2016, and in 2017 directed a film about Muslim women in Birmingham entitled Crossing Birmingham’s Invisible Borders. For his work on the BBC Asian Network he won the Radio Presenter of the Year Award at the 2020 Asian Media Awards.

Alom has worked for the BBC covering The Boat Race, and the 2022 Commonwealth Games, held in his hometown of Birmingham. In June 2023 he was announced as the new presenter for the BBC's daily flagship tennis highlights programme for the Wimbledon Championships, Today at Wimbledon.
