= Jake Humphrey =

English television presenter and entrepreneur

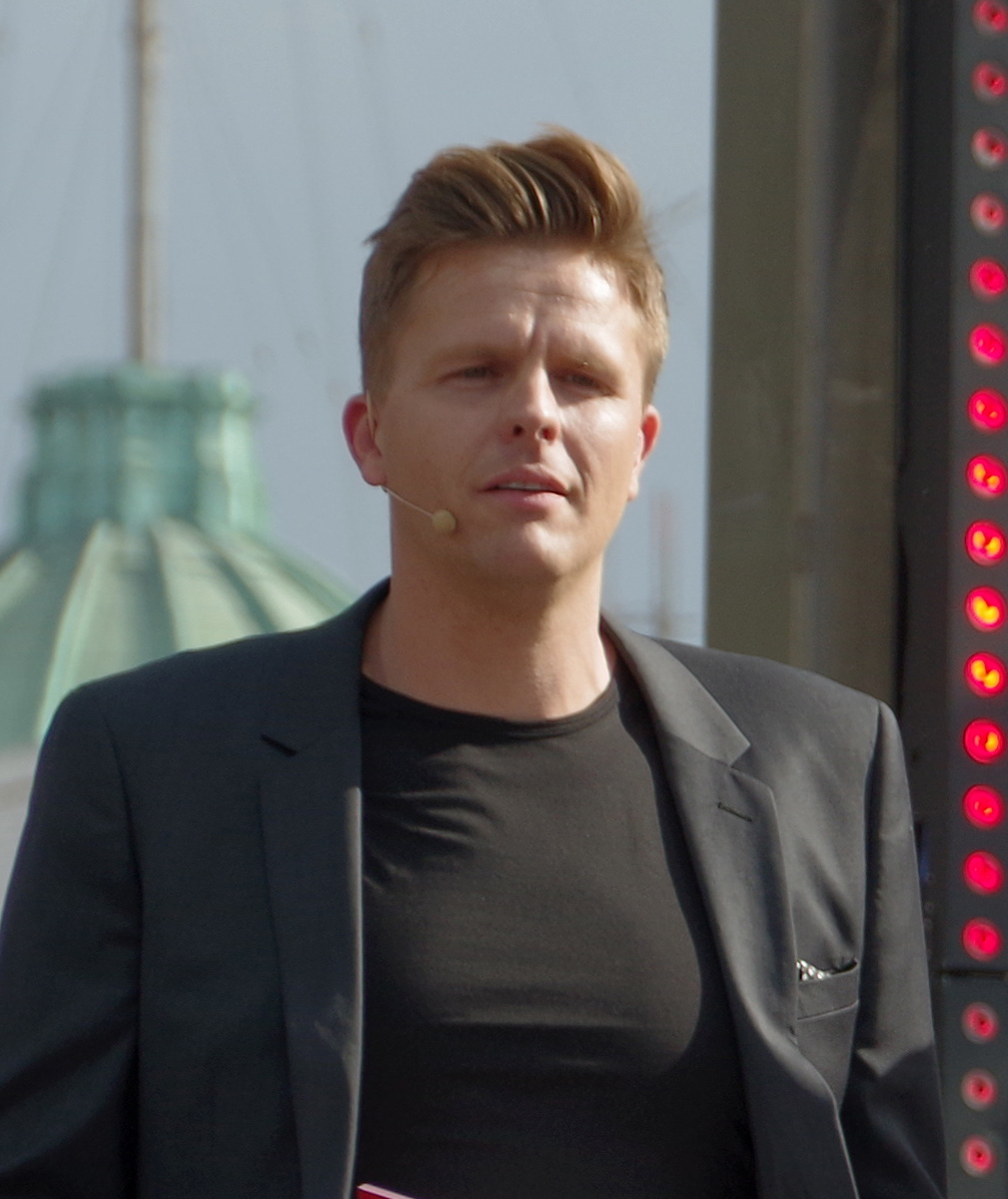
- Humphrey in 2017
- Born: Jacob John Humphrey; 7 October 1978 (age 48); Peterborough, Cambridgeshire, England
- Occupations: Television presenter, journalist, author, entrepreneur
- Years active: 1998–present
- Employer(s): BBC; CBBC; ITV; BT Sport; Whisper Group
- Height: 1.93 m (6 ft 4 in)
- Spouse: Harriet Humphrey (m. 2007)
- Children: 2

Jacob John Humphrey (born 7 October 1978) is an English broadcaster, author and entrepreneur. He is best known for hosting BBC Sport's coverage of Formula One, presenting football coverage for BT Sport, and for his work as co-founder of the television production company Whisper Group.

== Early life ==
Humphrey was born in Peterborough, Cambridgeshire. His family moved to Norwich, Norfolk, when he was nine.

== Career ==
=== Early career ===
Humphrey began his broadcasting career with CBBC, presenting children's programming before moving into sports broadcasting. He later joined BBC Sport, initially presenting football programming before progressing to major live sports coverage.

=== Sports presenting ===
At the 2008 Beijing Olympics, Humphrey presented daytime coverage of events for the BBC. That year he also began presenting BBC Sports Personality of the Year, which he continued to do until 2011. In 2009, he became the main presenter of the BBC's Formula One coverage.

For the Delhi 2010 Commonwealth Games, Humphrey was one of the main presenters of the BBC coverage. At the London 2012 Olympic Games, he presented live from the velodrome and hosted evening coverage on BBC Three. Humphrey left the BBC in 2012 to join BT Sport.

From the 2013–14 football season, Humphrey fronted BT Sport's Premier League programming. His role later expanded to include coverage of the FA Cup, UEFA Champions League and UEFA Europa League. In 2023, it was announced that he would step down from his presenting role at BT Sport after ten years.

Humphrey also briefly hosted coverage of the 2011 Royal Wedding from a Lancaster bomber; however, the broadcast was cut short due to technical issues.

=== Writing ===
Humphrey is the author of several books on performance and personal development, including High Performance: Lessons from the Best on Becoming Your Best, published by Penguin.

== Personal life ==
Humphrey married production manager Harriet in 2007. They have two children and live in Norwich. He is a supporter of Norwich City and received an honorary Doctorate of Civil Law from the University of East Anglia in 2012.
