= Dock10 (television facility) =

Television facility owner and media services company

Coordinates: 53°28′21″N 2°17′58″W

Dock 10 Limited

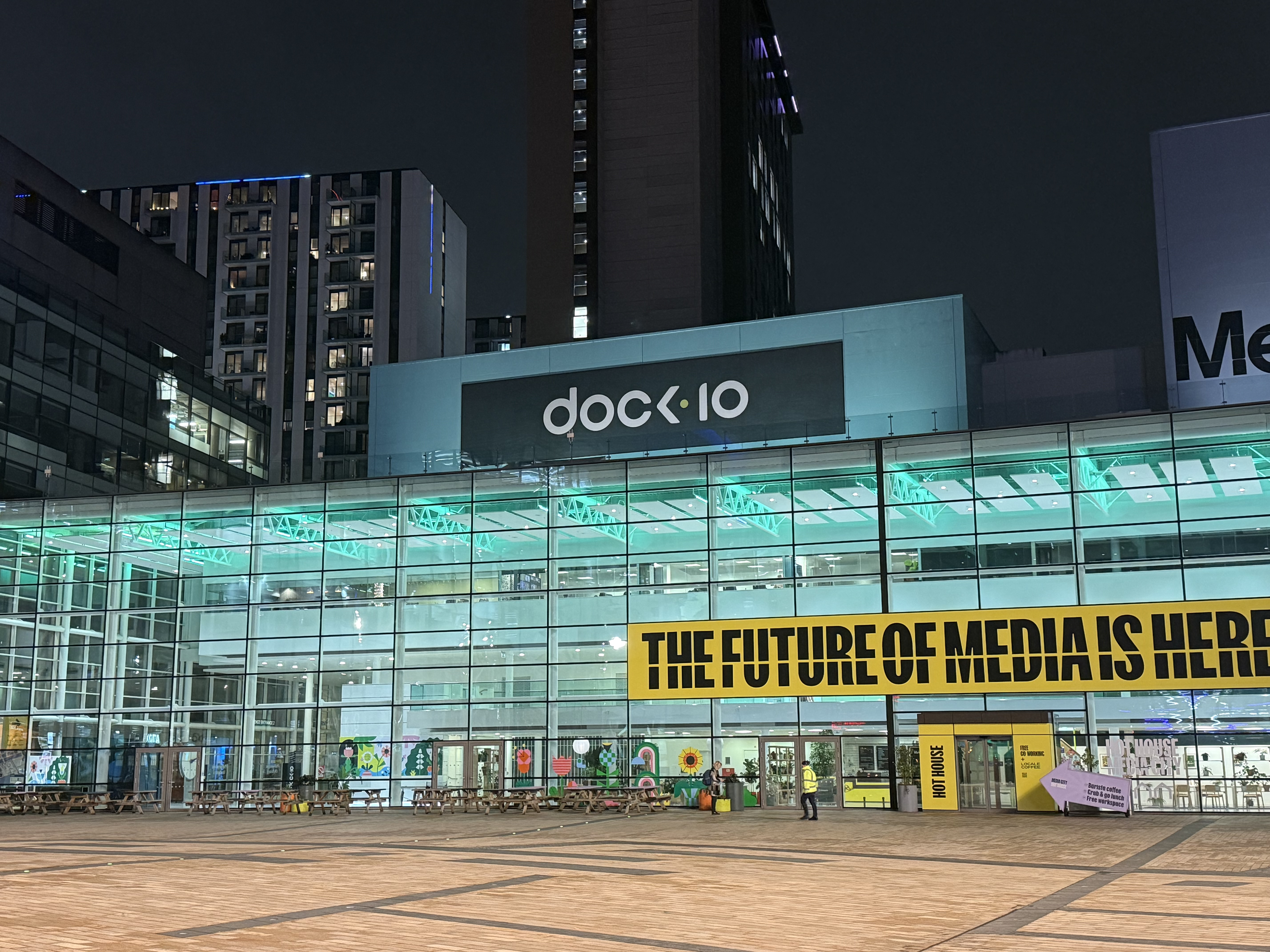
- MediaCity Studios, formerly known as dock10
- Trade name: MediaCity Studios; MediaCity Post
- Type: Private
- Industry: Media & production
- Founded: 18 June 2010; 16 years ago
- Headquarters: MediaCityUK, Salford, Greater Manchester, England, UK
- Key people: Alice Webb (CEO); Mark Senior (chief executive, 2012-2025)
- Services: Television studios; Recording studios; Post-production
- Revenue: £25.5m (2018)
- Net income: £0.8m (2018)
- Total assets: £2.89m (2018)
- Owner: Landsec
- Number of employees: 167 (2018)
- Website: dock10.co.uk

Dock 10 Limited, trading as MediaCity Studios and MediaCity Post (formerly trading as dock10), is a television facility operator and media services company in the City of Salford, Greater Manchester, England. Television studio facilities are provided through MediaCity Studios; post production facilities are provided through MediaCity Post.

Its studio filming facility, often referred to as The Studios, is the best-known part of the company. It was built as a major part of the surrounding MediaCityUK development. The move saw a number of major productions leave London for the first time and head north to Salford. The BBC, ITV and Channel 4 all relocated the filming of various shows to The Studios. This included established British shows Match of the Day, Blue Peter, 8 Out of 10 Cats and Countdown.

== History ==
The idea for MediaCityUK began in 2004 when BBC announced that it was interested in moving hundreds of jobs away from London to another UK city. The Peel Group was involved from the early stages of this move, which resulted in announcing the construction of a 200-acre development in Salford Quays, Greater Manchester. The BBC and The Peel Group announced in 2007 that the construction would begin on the media-based development.

At the heart of the MediaCityUK project was the idea of producing BBC shows outside London. A studio was then proposed at the site, which was constructed in time for the BBC move in 2011. The new £22 million studio was originally known as MediaCityUK studios, before becoming The Studios. The BBC became the first major tenant of The Studios. The Studios and the media infrastructure were rebranded in 2012, and dock10 was formed.

In 2013, dock10 signed its first production deal with ITV. The deal was to use dock10 to record and produce a number of ITV Studios shows, and was extended in 2016 to run until 2018.

By 2016, dock10 had grown into a major production provider to British-based TV shows. In March 2016, dock10 announced that it had acquired Edit 19, a Manchester-based visual effects and editing company. Later that year, it announced that it was expanding its post-production facility, offering many services gained from the acquisition of Edit 19.

In May 2017, dock10 opened a new studio, HQ8, suitable for small sets and green-screen productions. This studio was designed to meet the demands from creative agencies and digital content creators wanting to use professional facilities.

In November 2017, dock10 announced that it had secured a contract with BBC Creative. This would mean certain BBC promos and branding work would be produced outside of London.

Since the 2018 revival of Who Wants to Be a Millionaire?, the show has been filmed at dock10. It was previously filmed at Elstree Studios in Hertfordshire.

In January 2019, ITV Studios announced plans to remain at dock10 until at least 2021. The extended contract meant the company's shows would continue to be filmed and produced on site, which included shows such as Judge Rinder and (as of May 2019, cancelled) The Jeremy Kyle Show.

The post-production facilities at dock10 were expanded in 2019 as part of a wider £5 million investment to meet increased demand. The expansion included a new creative production space called The Second Floor, which provides additional space for production companies. The new facilities include fourteen edit suites, audio tracklay, and dubbing suites.

In May 2019, dock10 announced the launch of a new 4K UHD-ready virtual studio capability using Epic Games' Unreal Engine 4. This technology allows programme makers to create photorealistic output in real time.

In August 2019, dock10 hosted JD Sports inaugural Esports event, JDX, with the semi-finals and finals being hosted at the facility.

For the launch of the 2019–20 football season, BBC Sport announced that its football shows Match of the Day and Match of the Day 2 would be broadcast from a virtual reality studio at dock10. This studio will also be used by other BBC football programs including Final Score and Football Focus.

Channel 4 has commissioned a new peak-time Christmas-themed four-part series Buy It Now, to be hosted by Rylan Clark-Neal. Buy It Now is produced by Studio Lambert North and will be filmed at dock10.

In July 2026, the dock10 studio facilities were renamed to MediaCity Studios, and its post-production houses were renamed to MediaCity Post.

== 2024 LandSec acquisition and 2026 MediaCity Studios rebrand ==
In November 2024, Land Securities Group plc ("Landsec") took full control of the Media City development, following its initial acquisition of a 75% per cent stake of the overall MCUK development in 2021.

As part of the final acquisition phase, Landsec also gained control of the remaining 25% interest in the MCUK development from Peel, as well as Dock10 (LS Studios Limited, formerly Peel Media Studios Limited, of which dock10 is a subsidiary). In mid-2026, Landsec rebranded Dock10 to MediaCity Studios and Post.

== Selection of live and prerecorded shows originated from MediaCity Studios ==
- Countdown
- Catchphrase
- 8 out of 10 Cats (and the Countdown crossover)
- The Jeremy Kyle Show
- Judge Rinder
- Children in Need live broadcast
- Comic Relief live broadcast
- BBC Sports Personality of the Year
- Who Wants to Be a Millionaire?
- Jane McDonald & Friends
- Wheel of Fortune
- Mastermind
- Deal or No Deal (2023 revival)
- Wisdom of the Crowd (pilot)
- Lingo (UK and US formats)
- The Voice
- Match of the Day
