= BBC Young Sports Personality of the Year =

BBC Young Sports Personality of the Year Award
- Country: United Kingdom
- Presented by: BBC Sports Personality of the Year
- Formerly called: BBC Sports Personality of the Year Newcomer Award
- First award: 1999; 27 years ago
- Most recent winner: Michelle Agyemang (2025)

The BBC Young Sports Personality of the Year award is presented at the annual BBC Sports Personality of the Year award ceremony. It is awarded to the sportsperson who is aged 17 or under as of 1 January of that year, who has made the most outstanding contribution to sport in that year.

== Nomination procedure ==
Nominees have to be British citizens or are residents who "play a significant amount of their sport in the UK" with their solo "core achievements" being undertaken in the UK.

As of 2024, nominations are put forward by a judging panel which includes representatives from the BBC, Youth Sport Trust, a Blue Peter presenter, a young Blue Peter "guest" judge and sporting talent who then decide on a ten-person shortlist. The panel later reconvenes to choose the top three, and decides on the winner by secret ballot.

== History ==
The BBC Young Sports Personality of the Year award was preceded by the BBC Sports Personality of the Year Newcomer Award, in which the recipients could be aged up to 25. Decathlete Dean Macey was the inaugural winner of the Newcomer Award in 1999, and racing driver Jenson Button was the second and last winner the following year. In 2001, the award was replaced by the Young Sports Personality of the Year, and sprinter Amy Spencer was the first recipient of that award. The only person to win the award more than once is diver Tom Daley, who won the award three times, in 2007, 2009, and 2010. The most recent award was presented in 2025 to footballer Michelle Agyemang.

== Winners ==
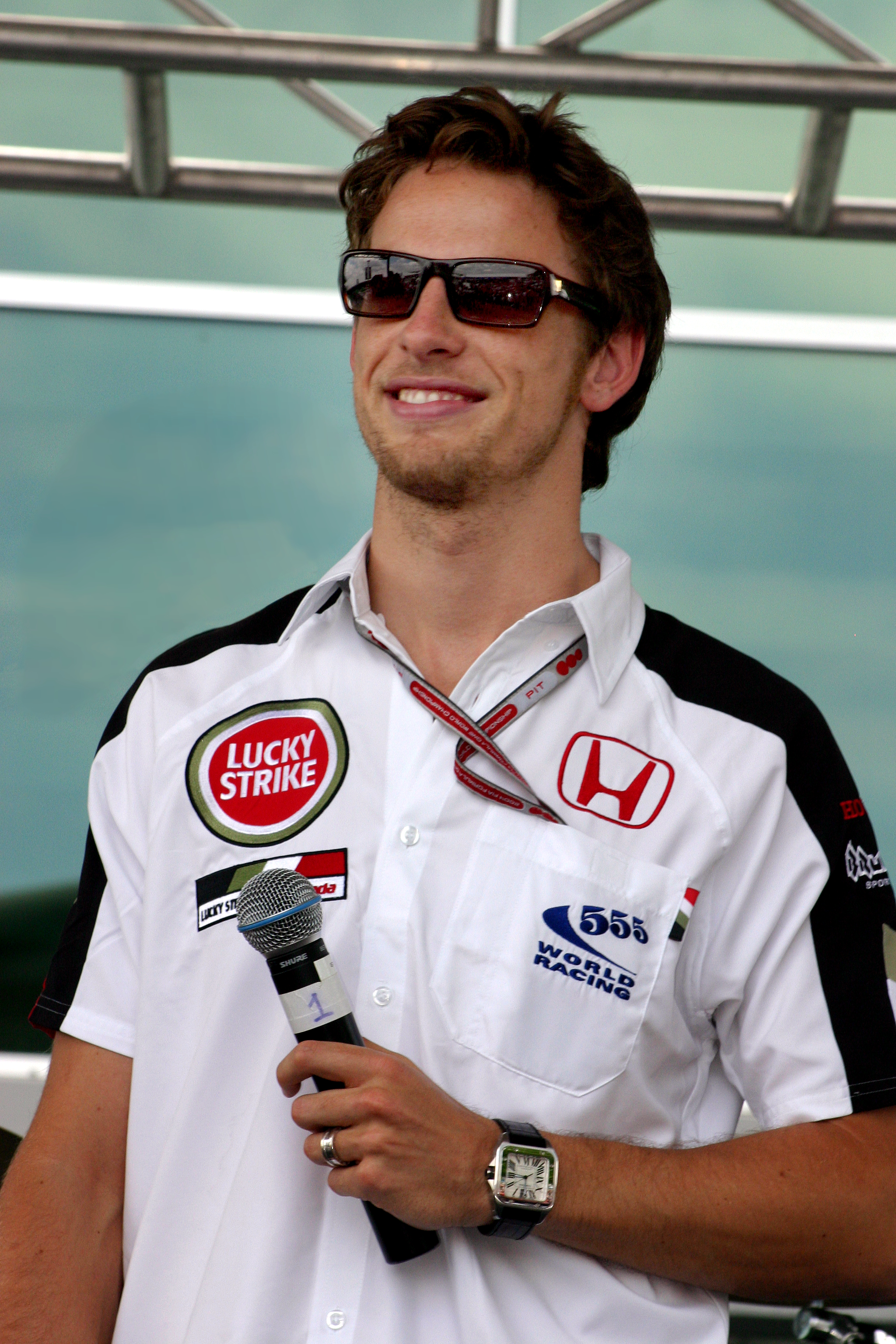
Jenson Button was the last recipient of the Newcomer Award in 2000.

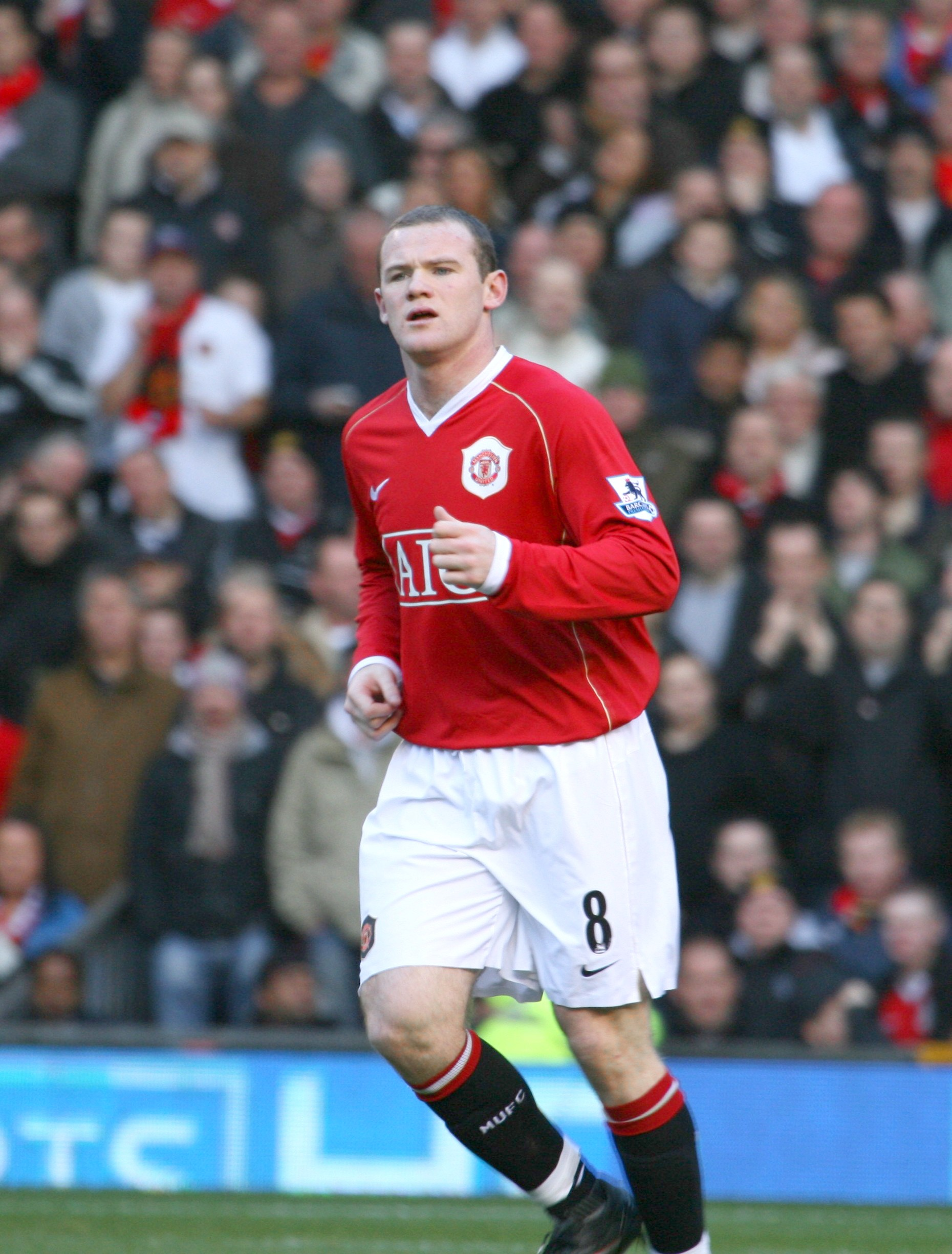
Wayne Rooney won the award in 2002.

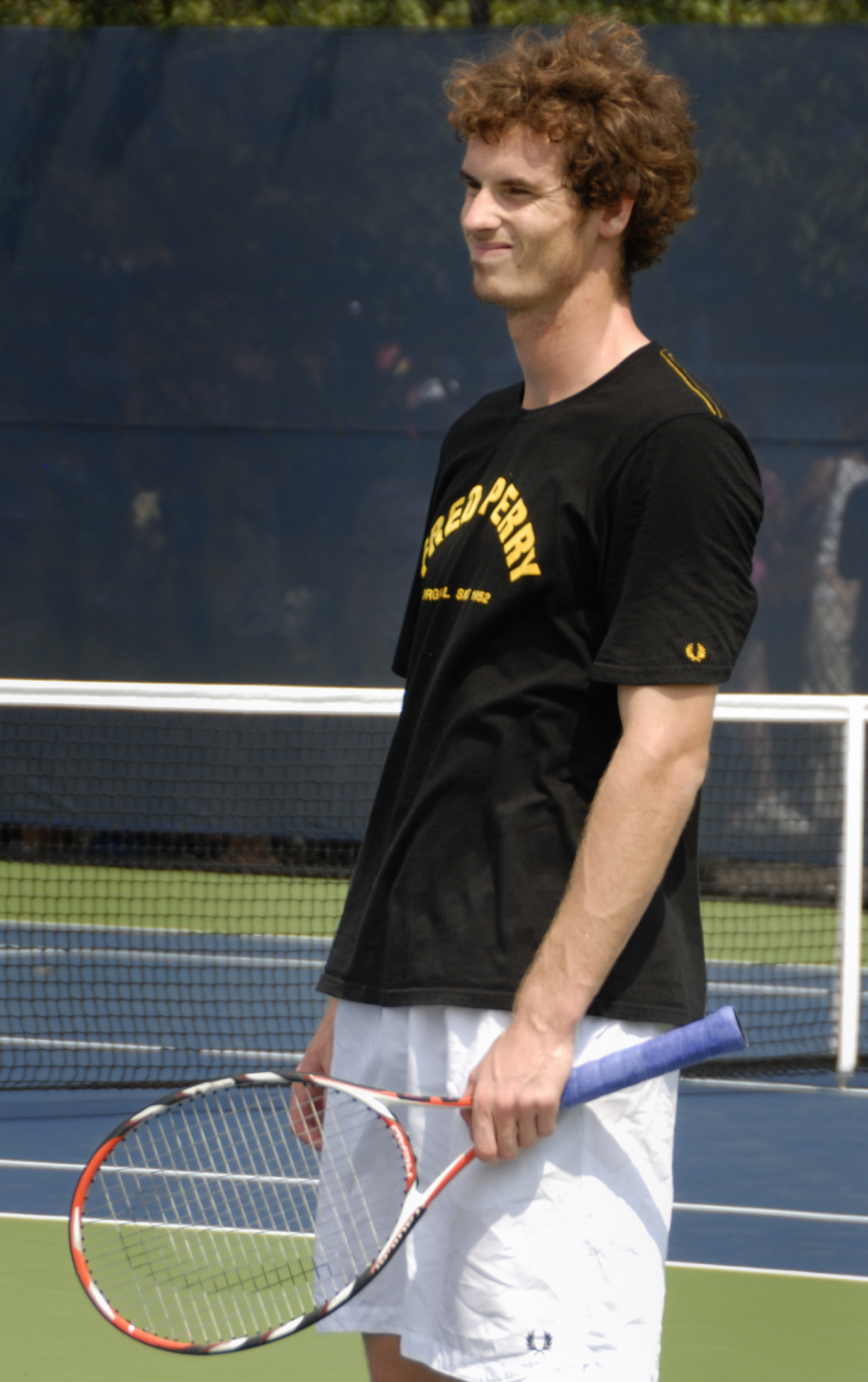
Andy Murray won the award in 2004.

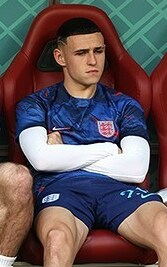
2017 recipient Phil Foden.

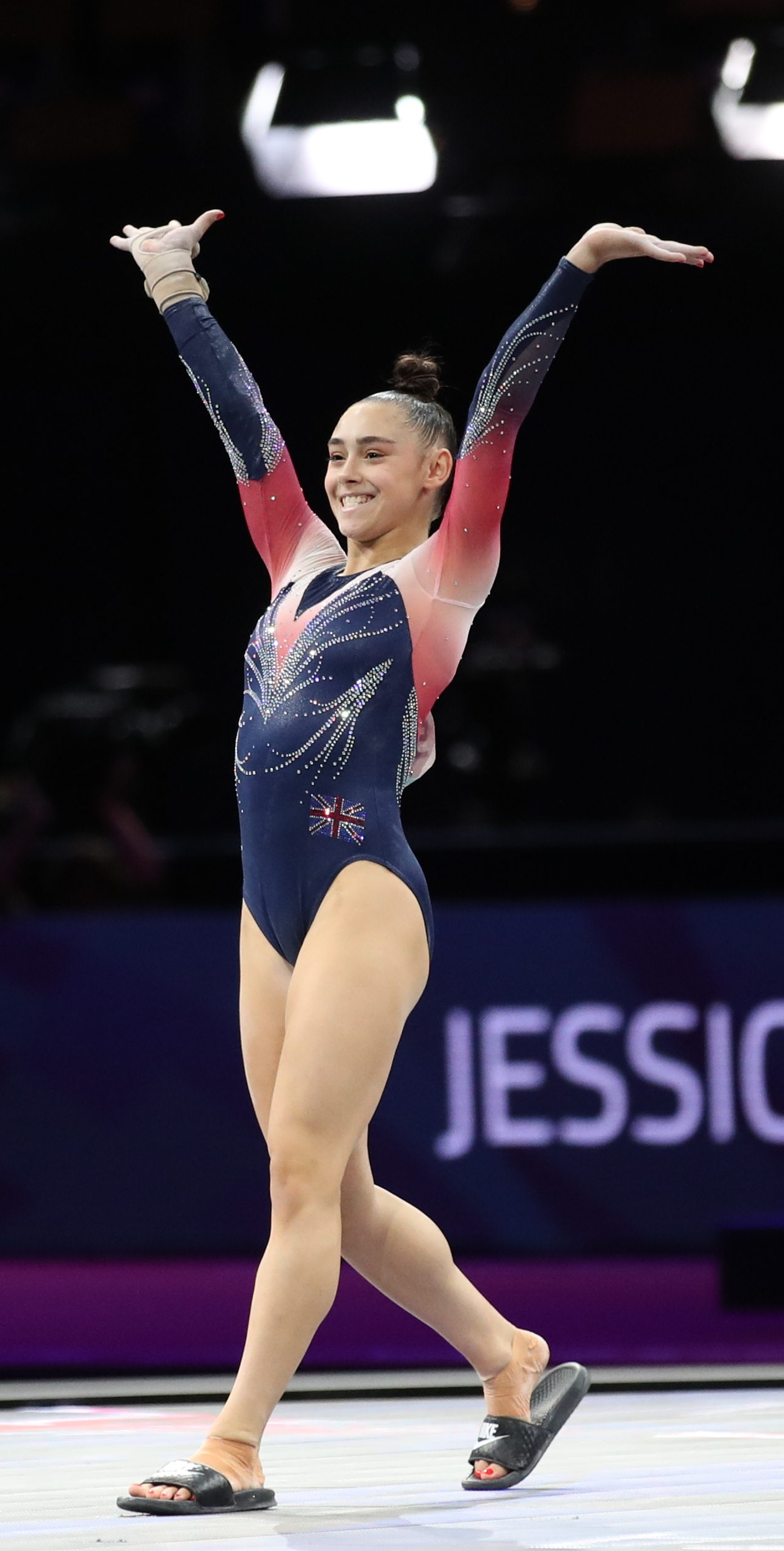
Jessica Gadirova won the award in 2022.

=== Newcomer Award ===
Year	Winner	Age when awarded	Sport	Rationale	Note
1999	Dean Macey	21	Athletics	For "a string of stunning performances in the decathlon" and a "rise to prominence at [the 1999] World Championship"	
2000	Jenson Button	20	Formula One	For finishing "in eighth place in his debut Formula One World Championship season"	

=== Young Personality Award ===
Year	Winner	Age when awarded	Sport	Rationale	Note
2001	Amy Spencer	16	Athletics	For being "world under-18 silver medallist in the 100m and 200m, despite still having two years left in the age group"	
2002	Wayne Rooney	17	Football	For being "touted by many as the most promising English football talent to have surfaced in recent years"	
2003	Kate Haywood	17	Swimming	For becoming the "youngest ever swimmer to represent England at the 2002 Commonwealth Games winning a bronze in the 4x100m medley relay" and for "clinching gold in the 50m breaststroke at the European Junior Championships"	
2004	Andy Murray	17	Tennis	For making "giant strides in the world of tennis in the past 12 months, during which time he won the US Open juniors title"	
2005	Harry Aikines-Aryeetey	17	Athletics	For becoming the "first sprinter in the six-year history of the IAAF World Youth Championships to win gold in both the 100m and 200m"	
2006	Theo Walcott	17	Football	For a "fantastic year in which he transferred to Arsenal and went to the World Cup with England"	
2007	Tom Daley	13	Diving	For "achievements in diving which include becoming the youngest-ever National Men's Platform Champion"	
2008	Eleanor Simmonds	14	Swimming	For becoming "Britain's youngest ever individual Paralympic gold medallist"	
2009	Tom Daley	15	Diving	For winning the men's 10 m platform event at the world championships, and becoming "Britain's youngest world champion in any sport".	
2010	Tom Daley	16	Diving	For winning two gold medals in the 2010 Commonwealth Games	
2011	Lauren Taylor	17	Golf	Youngest-ever winner of the Ladies' British Open Amateur Championship, breaking a 112-year record	
2012	Josef Craig	15	Swimming	Winner of gold medal in the Paralympic 400 metre freestyle S7. Youngest British winner of a gold medal at the 2012 Paralympics.	
2013	Amber Hill	16	Shooting	Youngest winner of a senior World Cup in skeet shooting. Finished the season ranked number one senior in Great Britain and ranked fifth in the world.	
2014	Claudia Fragapane	17	Artistic gymnastics	Won four gold medals to become the most successful English woman at the Commonwealth Games in 84 years, before reaching three individual finals at her first World Championships.	
2015	Ellie Downie	17	Artistic gymnastics	Won a bronze medal to become the first woman to win an all-around senior international medal for Great Britain at the European Championships. Helped Great Britain to an unprecedented bronze medal in the Women's Team competition at the World Championships.	
2016	Eleanor Robinson	15	Swimming	Won a gold medal S6 50m butterfly category with a Games record and a bronze medal in the S6 100m Freestyle category at the 2016 Rio Paralympic Games	
2017	Phil Foden	17	Football	Won the Golden Ball as the best player at the FIFA Under-17 World Cup as England won the tournament.	
2018	Kare Adenegan	17	Wheelchair racing	Broke T34 100m world record, and won European Championships	
2019	Caroline Dubois	18	Boxing	Won 40 consecutive boxing matches	
2020	Andrea Spendolini-Sirieix	16	Diving	Won her first senior international gold medal and the senior British title in the women's 10 m platform event	
2021	Sky Brown	13	Skateboarding	Became the youngest ever British Summer Olympian at the age of 13 by winning the bronze medal at the Women's park Skateboarding competition in the 2020 Summer Olympics	
2022	Jessica Gadirova	18	Artistic gymnastics	Became the fifth individual British world champion gymnast in history and the first British woman to win a world all-around medal. Also won her second European gold.	
2023	Mia Brookes	16	Snowboarding	Became the youngest ever Snowboard World Champion at the Bakuriani World Championships, also becoming the first Brit to win a snowboard slopestyle world title. She also became the first woman to land a Cab 1440 in a competition.	
2024	Luke Littler	17	Darts	Became the youngest PDC World Darts Championship finalist, the youngest winner of both the Premier League Darts and Grand Slam of Darts.	
2025	Michelle Agyemang	19	Football	Scored in the quarter-final and semi-final of Euro 2025 as part of the victorious England side only three months after making her senior international debut	

== Winners by sport ==
Sport	Number of wins
Athletics	4*
Diving	4
Swimming	4
Artistic Gymnastics	3
Football	3
Boxing	1
Darts	1
Formula One	1*
Golf	1
Shooting	1
Skateboarding	1
Snowboarding	1
Tennis	1

* Including a Newcomer of the Year award
