= BBC Sports Personality of the Year Coach Award =

British annual award

- Country: United Kingdom
- Presented by: BBC Sports Personality of the Year
- First award: 1999; 27 years ago
- Currently held by: Sarina Wiegman (2025)

The BBC Sports Personality of the Year Coach Award is an award given annually as part of the BBC Sports Personality of the Year ceremony each December. The award is given to the coach who was considered to have made the most substantive contribution to British sport in that year.

== History ==
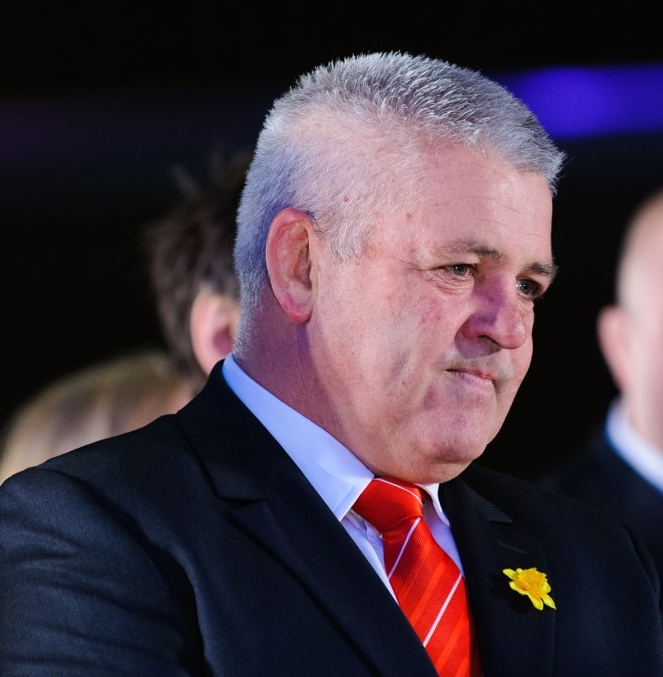
Warren Gatland, the winner in 2013

The first recipient of the award was Manchester United manager Alex Ferguson in 1999. The award has been presented to a football manager on ten occasions. It has been awarded to nine Britons, and eleven of the other fourteen winners were European. Daniel Anderson, the only winner from the Southern Hemisphere, was in his native Australia at the time of the awards, so the then St. Helens captain, Paul Sculthorpe, collected it on his behalf. In 2007, Enzo Calzaghe was the first recipient of the award who had coached an individual and not a team. The most recent award was presented in 2024 to athlete Keely Hodgkinson's coaches Jenny Meadows and Trevor Painter.

== Nomination procedure ==
The award is decided by a panel of over 30 sporting journalists. Each panellist votes for their top two choices; their first preference is awarded two points, and their second preference is awarded one point. The winning coach is the one with the largest points total. In the case of a points tie, the person chosen as first preference by the most panellists is the winner. If this is also a tie the award is shared.

== Winners ==
=== By year ===
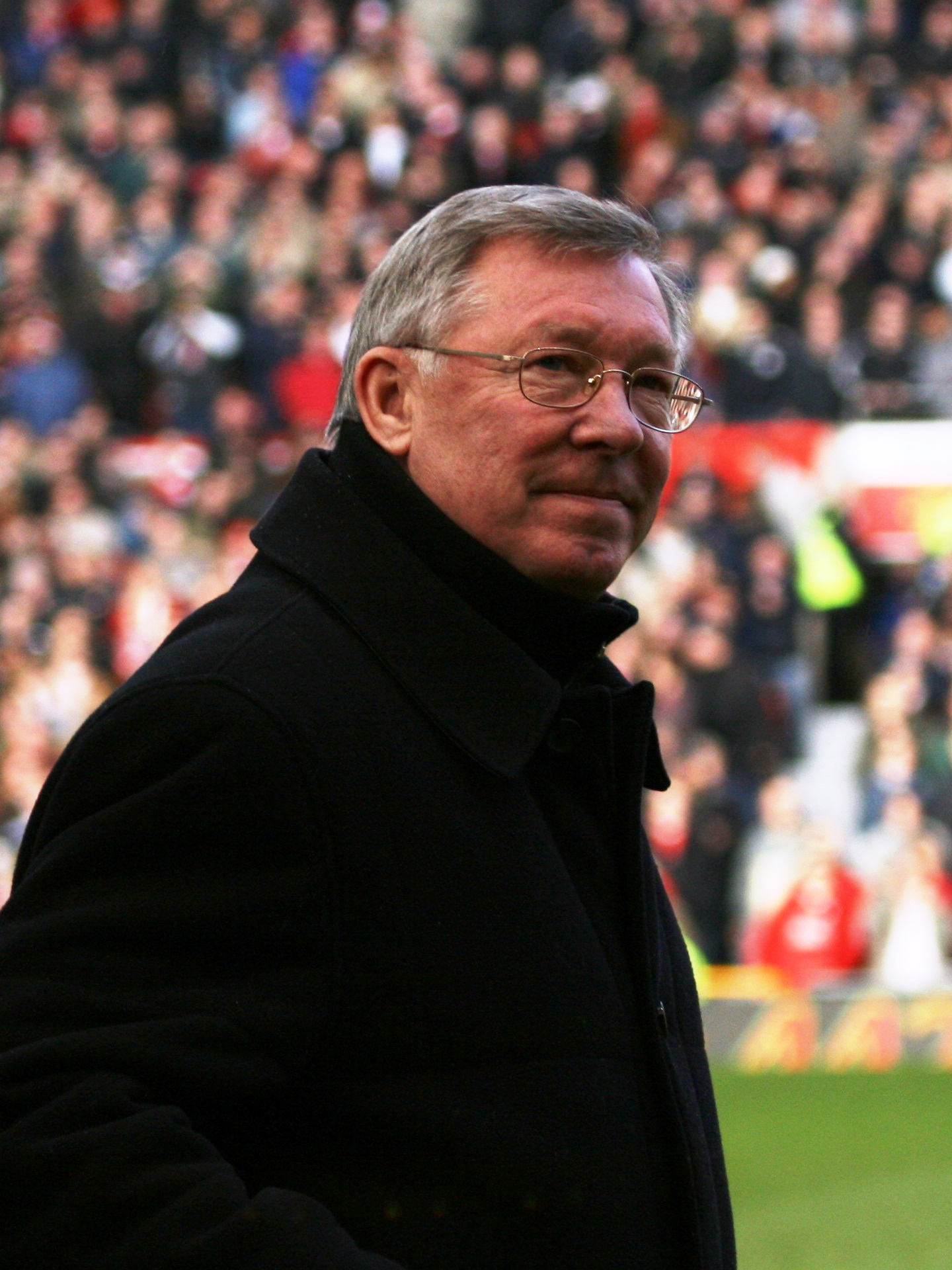
Alex Ferguson, the inaugural winner in 1999.

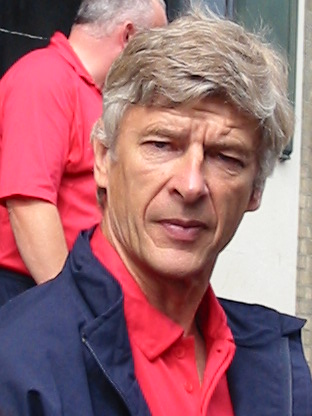
Arsène Wenger, two times winner in 2002 and 2004.

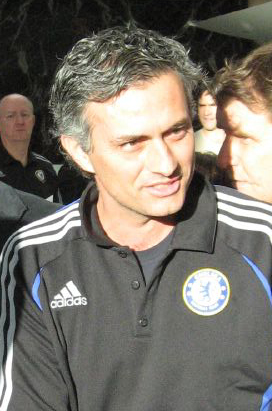
José Mourinho, winner in 2005.

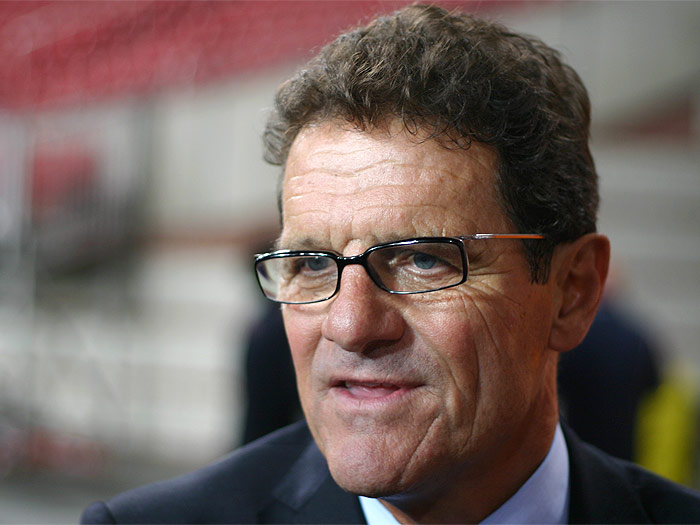
Fabio Capello, the winner in 2009

BBC Sports Personality of the Year Coach Award winners
Year	Nat.	Winner	Sport	Coach of	Rationale	Ref.
1999	SCO	Alex Ferguson	Football	(England) Manchester United	for guiding Manchester United to be "the first side to complete a unique treble" of the Premier League, FA Cup, and Champions League.	
2000	GER	Jürgen Gröbler	Rowing	(United Kingdom) Olympic team	for guiding "Redgrave, Matthew Pinsent, Tim Foster & James Cracknell to their coxless fours gold" at the Olympics.	
2001	SWE	Sven-Göran Eriksson	Football	England	for guiding England through qualification for the World Cup, defeating Germany 5–1 in the process.	
2002	FRA	Arsène Wenger (1/2)	Football	(England) Arsenal	for guiding Arsenal to the Double of the Premiership and FA Cup.	
2003	ENG	Clive Woodward	Rugby Union	England	for guiding "his team to a famous World Cup victory in Australia."	
2004	FRA	Arsène Wenger (2/2)	Football	(England) Arsenal	for guiding Arsenal to a "third Premiership-winning campaign (...) as his side went through the entire season unbeaten."	
2005	POR	José Mourinho	Football	(England) Chelsea	for guiding "Chelsea to their first title for 50 years in his first season in charge."	
2006	AUS	Daniel Anderson	Rugby league	(England) St Helens R.F.C.	"for guiding the team to Challenge Cup, minor Premiership and Grand Final triumph."	
2007	ITA	Enzo Calzaghe	Boxing	(Wales) Joe Calzaghe	for training Joe Calzaghe to 44 undefeated fights and 10 years as world champion.	
2008	WAL	David Brailsford (1/2)	Cycling	(United Kingdom) Olympic team	for guiding the British Olympic cycling team to "14 medals in total in Beijing, including eight golds."	
2009	ITA	Fabio Capello	Football	England	for guiding "England to the 2010 World Cup in South Africa winning an impressive nine out of the 10 qualifiers played".	
2010	SCO	Colin Montgomerie	Golf	(Europe) European Ryder Cup team	for guiding Europe to victory in the 2010 Ryder Cup.	
2011	ZIM	Andy Flower	Cricket	England cricket team	for guiding England to victory in The Ashes and to the top of the ICC Test Ranking	
2012	WAL	David Brailsford (2/2)	Cycling	(United Kingdom) Olympic team/Team Sky	for guiding the British Olympic cycling team to "12 medals in total in London, including eight golds, and for guiding Bradley Wiggins towards winning the Tour de France"	
2013	NZL	Warren Gatland	Rugby Union	(United Kingdom) / (Republic of Ireland) British & Irish Lions	for guiding the British & Irish Lions to a 2–1 series victory over Australia, the first series win since 1997.	
2014	IRL	Paul McGinley	Golf	(Europe) European Ryder Cup team	for guiding Europe to victory in the Ryder Cup.	
2015	NIR	Michael O'Neill	Football	Northern Ireland national football team	for guiding Northern Ireland to qualification for Euro 2016, the country's first major finals in 30 years	
2016	ITA	Claudio Ranieri	Football	(England) Leicester City F.C.	for leading Leicester City to their first Premier League title; the 2015–16 Premier League, despite pre-season odds of 5000–1.	
2017	SWE/NIR/WAL	Benke Blomkvist, Stephen Maguire & Christian Malcolm	Athletics	(United Kingdom) UK Athletics sprint relay teams	for coaching the UK Athletics relay teams. At the 2017 World Athletics championships the UK men's 4x100m relay won Gold and all four relay teams won medals	
2018	ENG	Gareth Southgate (1/2)	Football	England	for leading England Men to the 2018 World Cup semi-finals for the first time in 28 years.	
2019	ENG	John Blackie	Athletics	(England) Dina Asher-Smith	for guiding Dina Asher-Smith to 200m gold at the 2019 World Athletics Championships.	
2020	GER	Jürgen Klopp	Football	(England) Liverpool F.C.	for leading Liverpool to their first top-flight title in 30 years by winning the 2019–20 Premier League.	
2021	ENG	Gareth Southgate (2/2)	Football	England Men	for leading England to the UEFA Euro 2020 final at Wembley, ending the nation's 55-year wait for a major final since the 1966 World Cup.	
2022	NED	Sarina Wiegman	Football	England Women	for guiding England to victory at UEFA Women's Euro 2022, the nation's first major women's football trophy.	
2023	ESP	Pep Guardiola	Football	Manchester City F.C.	for guiding Manchester City to complete the treble of the Premier League, Champions League, and FA Cup.	
2024	ENG	Jenny Meadows and Trevor Painter	Athletics	Keely Hodgkinson; Georgia Bell; Lewis Davey	for guiding Keely Hodgkinson to the 800m gold medal, and Georgia Bell and Lewis Davey to 1500m and 4x400m relay bronze medals at the 2024 Paris Olympics.	
2025	NED	Sarina Wiegman	Football	England Women	for guiding England to victory at UEFA Women's Euro 2025, their second straight European Championship title.	

=== By nationality ===
This table lists the total number of awards won by coaches of each nationality based on the principle of jus soli.

Winners by nationality
Nationality	Number of wins
England	5
Italy	3
Wales	3
France	2
Germany	2
Netherlands	2
Northern Ireland	2
Scotland	2
Sweden	2
Australia	1
Republic of Ireland	1
New Zealand	1
Portugal	1
Zimbabwe	1
Spain	1

=== By sport ===
This table lists the total number of awards won by coaches' sporting profession.

Winners by sport
Sporting profession	Number of wins
Football	12
Athletics	3
Cycling	2
Golf	2
Rugby Union	2
Boxing	1
Cricket	1
Rowing	1
Rugby league	1
