= BBC Sports Personality World Sport Star of the Year =

British television sports award

BBC World Sport Star of the Year
- Country: United Kingdom
- Presented by: BBC Sports Personality of the Year
- Formerly called: BBC Overseas Sports Personality of the Year
- First award: 1960; 66 years ago
- Most recent winner: Armand Duplantis (2025)
- Website: https://www.bbc.com/sport/sports-personality

The BBC World Sport Star of the Year (formerly known as the BBC Overseas Sports Personality of the Year) is an award presented at the annual BBC Sports Personality of the Year award ceremony. The award is presented to a non-British sportsperson considered to have made the most substantial contribution to a sport in that year.

== History ==
The Overseas Personality award was first presented in 1960, six years after the BBC Sports Personality of the Year award was introduced. The first recipient of the award was Australian middle distance runner Herb Elliott. Since then, the award has been presented to 53 sportspersons. Swiss tennis player Roger Federer has won the award four times. American boxer Muhammad Ali and Jamaican sprinter Usain Bolt have both won the award three times. The award has been shared on three occasions—by Ron Clarke and Gary Player in 1965, Eusébio and Garfield Sobers in 1966, and Evander Holyfield and Michael Johnson in 1996. The husband-and-wife skating duo of Oleg Protopopov and Ludmila Belousova are the only pair to have won the award, doing so in 1968. Belousova was the first woman to become Overseas Personality—she was also the oldest, aged 33. George Moore is the oldest recipient of the award, winning in 1967 aged 44. The youngest recipient of the award is Nadia Comăneci, who won in 1976 at age 15. Boris Becker, who was 18 when he won in 1985, is the youngest male to have won.

Twenty-seven countries have been represented by the award winners as of 2024. United States sportspersons have won the award the most times, having had nineteen recipients, two of whom shared the award. Another US-born sportsperson received the award while representing Sweden. Three cricketers have received the award -- Garfield Sobers of Barbados, Brian Lara of Trinidad and Tobago (both of whom played for the West Indies cricket team), and Shane Warne of Australia. Fourteen sporting disciplines have been represented; tennis has the highest representation, with fifteen recipients.

Only one winner has ever been stripped of the award – US cyclist Lance Armstrong, whose 2003 award was rescinded following the UCI's 2012 decision to strip him of his titles and ban him for life from the sport.

In 2018, the award was renamed BBC World Sport Star of the Year. Along with the change of name, votes could be cast from outside of the UK for the first time.

== Nomination procedure ==
The award was decided by a panel of over 30 sporting journalists. Each panellist voted for their top two choices; their first preference was awarded two points, and their second preference was awarded one point. The winning sportsperson had the most total points. In the case of a points tie, the sportsperson chosen as first preference by the most panellists is the winner. If this is also a tie the award is shared. In 2015 the public voted for this award.

== Winners ==
=== By year ===
- † Denotes joint winners.
- ‡ Denotes a winning couple.

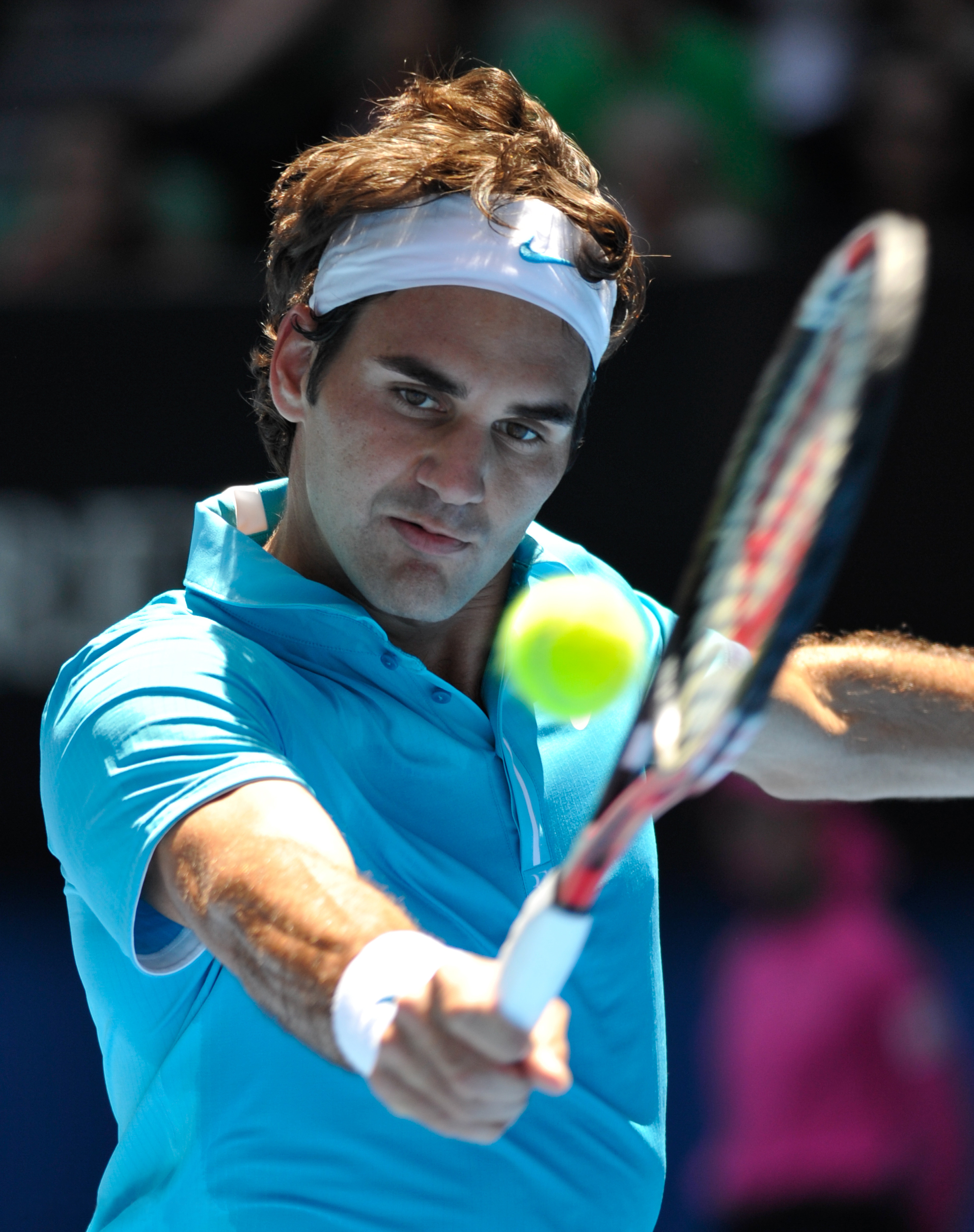
Roger Federer received the award a record four times

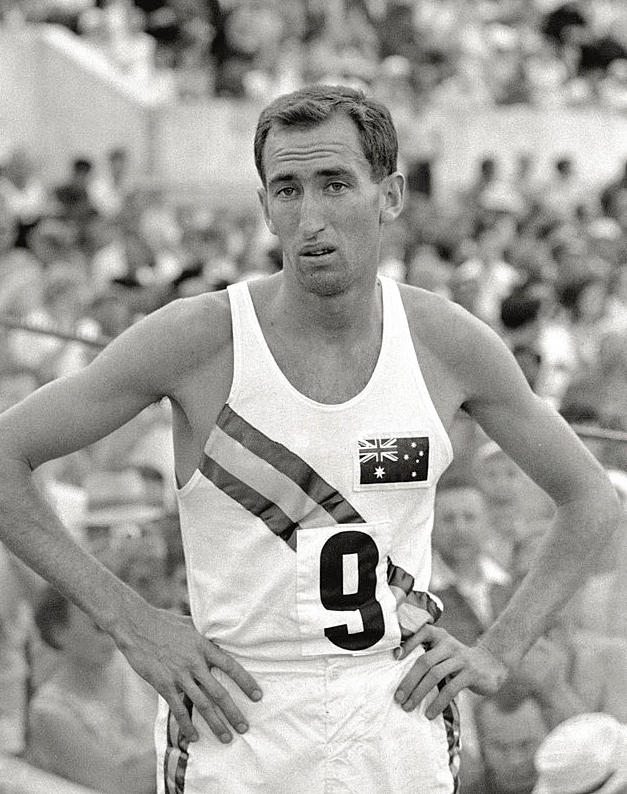
Herb Elliott, the first recipient

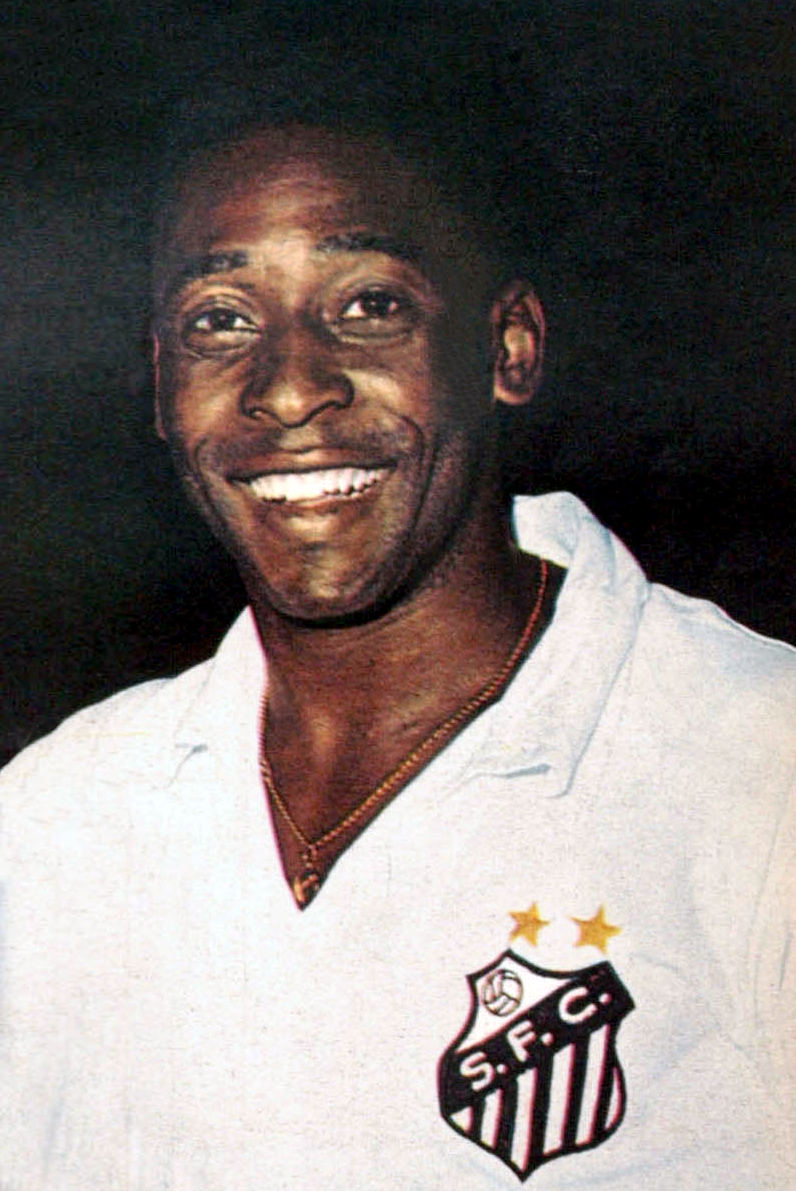
Pelé received the award in 1970 after winning a record third FIFA World Cup

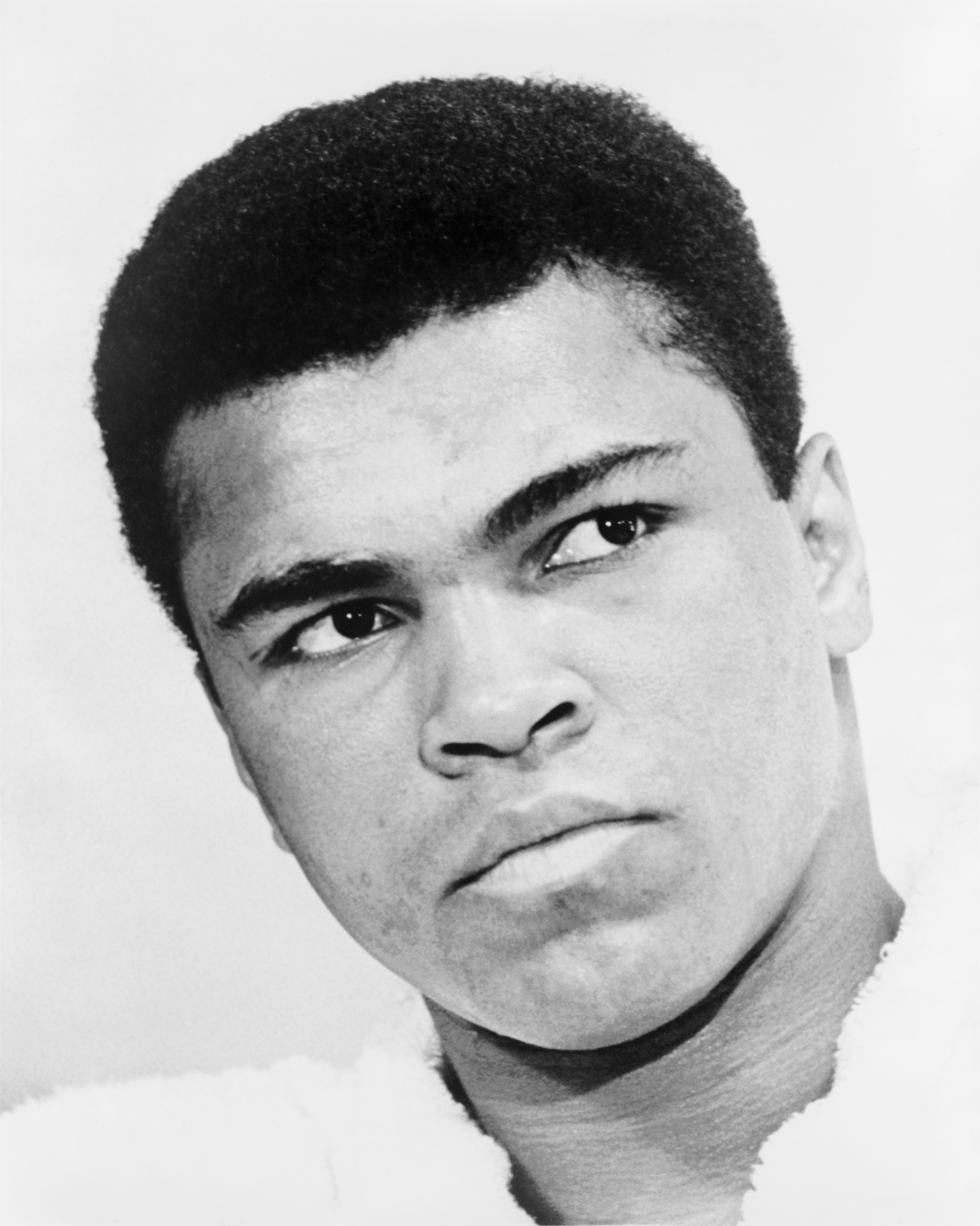

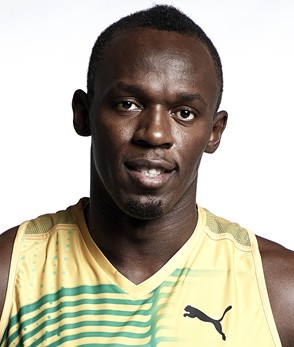
Muhammad Ali (top) and Usain Bolt (bottom) received the award three times.

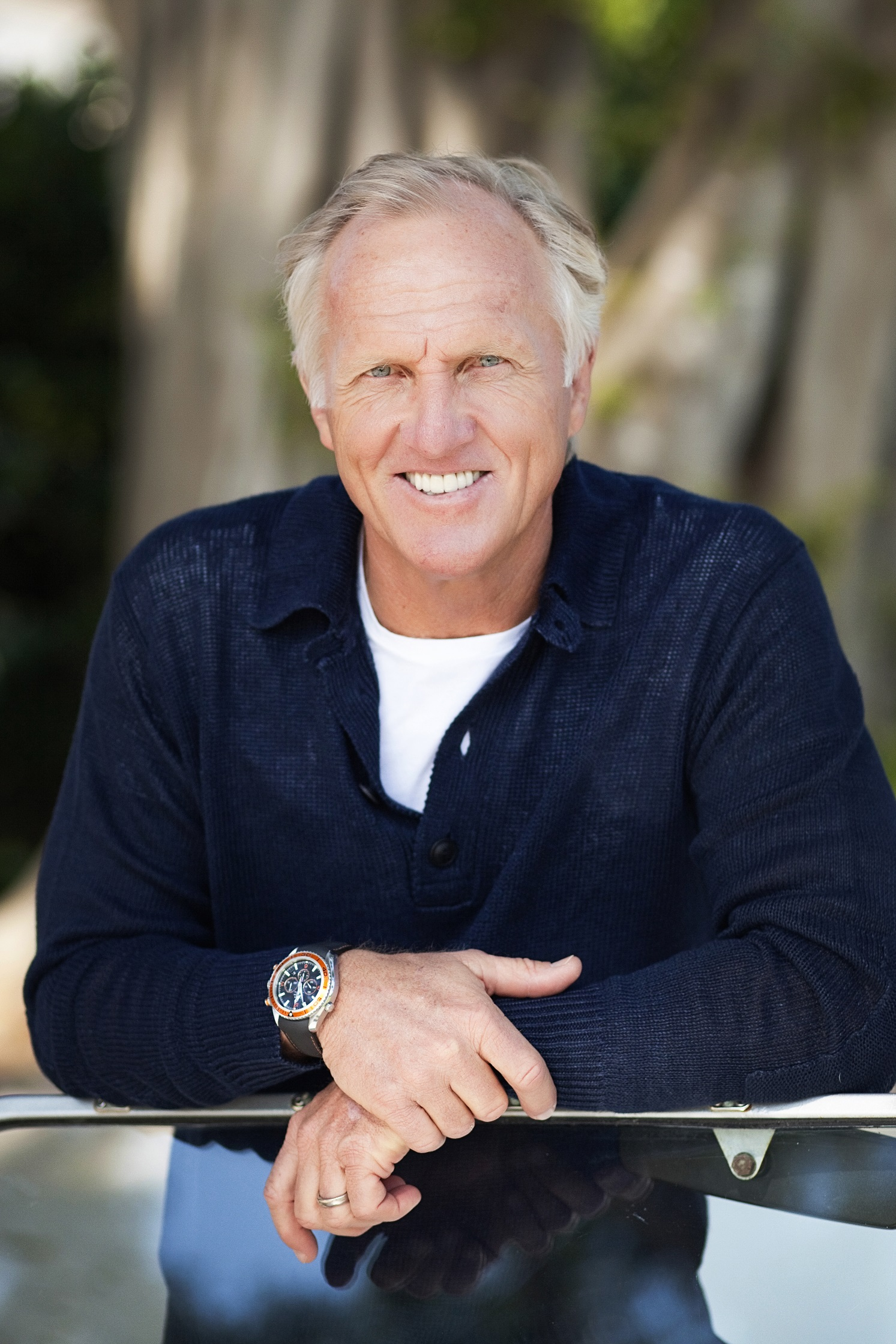
Greg Norman received the award two times

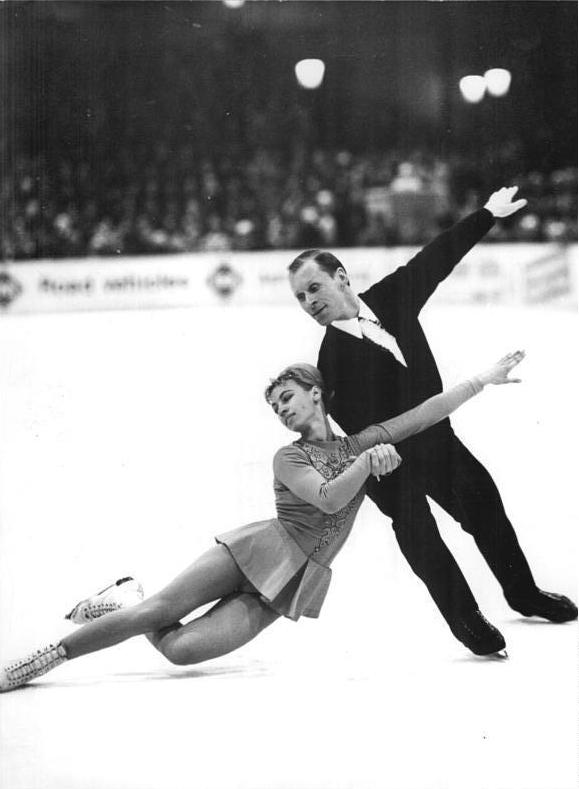
Oleg Protopopov and Ludmila Belousova, joint recipients of the award in 1968, are also husband and wife.

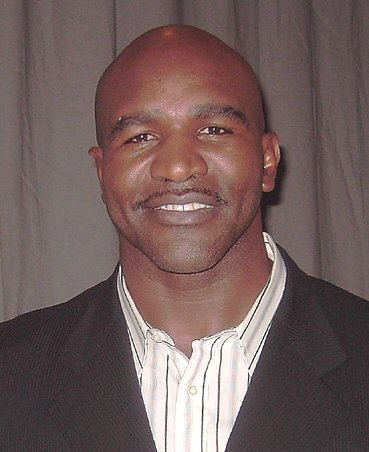
Evander Holyfield, who shared the award with Michael Johnson in 1996

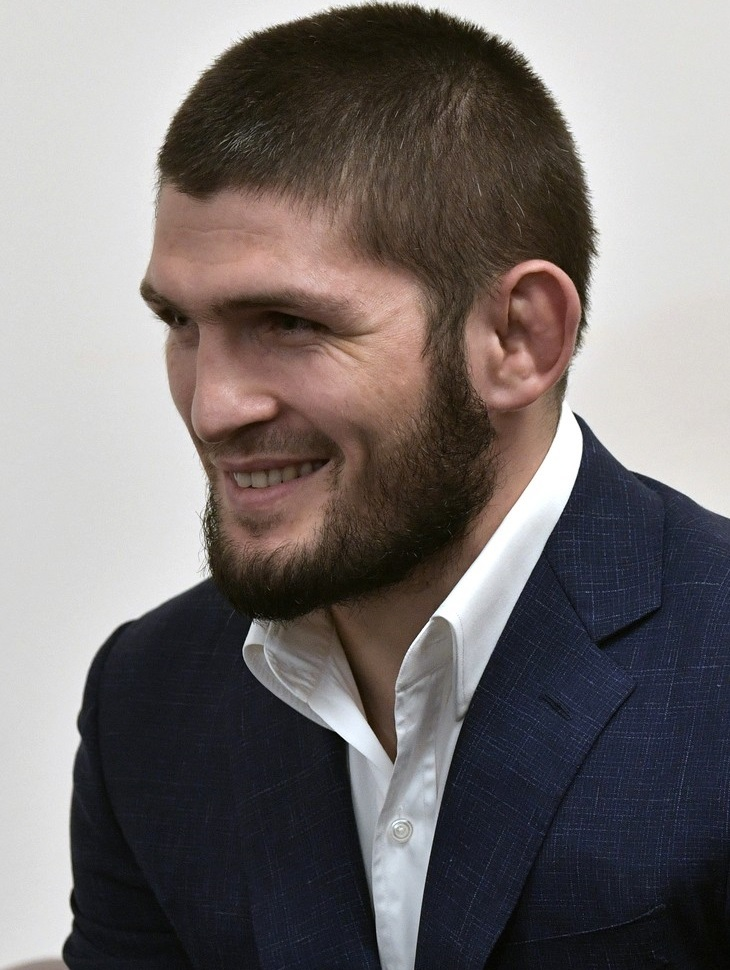
Mixed martial artist Khabib Nurmagomedov won the award in 2020

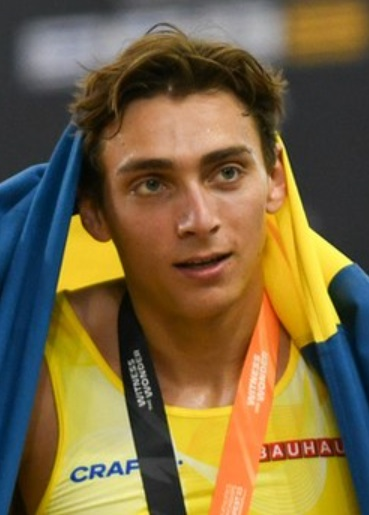
Armand Duplantis is the latest winner of this award (2025).

BBC Overseas Sports Personality of the Year winners
Year	Nationality	Winner	Sport	Note
1960	Australia	Herb Elliott	Athletics	
1961	Soviet Union	Valeriy Brumel	Athletics	
1962	Canada	Donald Jackson	Figure skating	
1963	France	Jacques Anquetil	Cycling	
1964	Ethiopia	Abebe Bikila	Athletics	
1965	Australia	Ron Clarke ^{†}	Athletics	
1965	South Africa	Gary Player ^{†}	Golf	
1966	Portugal	Eusébio ^{†}	Football	
1966	Barbados	Garfield Sobers ^{†}	Cricket	
1967	Australia	George Moore	Horse racing	
1968	Soviet Union	Oleg Protopopov ^{‡}	Figure skating	
1968	Soviet Union	Ludmila Belousova ^{‡}	Figure skating	
1969	Australia	Rod Laver	Tennis	
1970	Brazil	Pelé	Football	
1971	United States	Lee Trevino	Golf	
1972	Soviet Union	Olga Korbut	Gymnastics	
1973	United States	Muhammad Ali (1/3)	Boxing	
1974	United States	Muhammad Ali (2/3)	Boxing	
1975	United States	Arthur Ashe	Tennis	
1976	Romania	Nadia Comăneci	Gymnastics	
1977	Austria	Niki Lauda	Formula One	
1978	United States	Muhammad Ali (3/3)	Boxing	
1979	Sweden	Björn Borg	Tennis	
1980	United States	Jack Nicklaus	Golf	
1981	United States	Chris Evert	Tennis	
1982	United States	Jimmy Connors	Tennis	
1983	United States	Carl Lewis	Athletics	
1984	Spain	Seve Ballesteros	Golf	
1985	West Germany	Boris Becker	Tennis	
1986	Australia	Greg Norman (1/2)	Golf	
1987	United States	Martina Navratilova	Tennis	
1988	West Germany	Steffi Graf	Tennis	
1989	United States	Mike Tyson	Boxing	
1990	Australia	Mal Meninga	Rugby league	
1991	United States	Mike Powell	Athletics	
1992	United States	Andre Agassi	Tennis	
1993	Australia	Greg Norman (2/2)	Golf	
1994	Trinidad and Tobago	Brian Lara	Cricket	
1995	New Zealand	Jonah Lomu	Rugby union	
1996	United States	Evander Holyfield ^{†}	Boxing	
1996	United States	Michael Johnson	Athletics	
1997	Switzerland	Martina Hingis	Tennis	
1998	United States	Mark O'Meara	Golf	
1999	United States	Maurice Greene	Athletics	
2000	United States	Tiger Woods	Golf	
2001	Croatia	Goran Ivanišević	Tennis	
2002	Brazil	Ronaldo	Football	
2003	~~United States~~	~~Lance Armstrong~~	~~Cycling~~	
2004	Switzerland	Roger Federer (1/4)	Tennis	
2005	Australia	Shane Warne	Cricket	
2006	Switzerland	Roger Federer (2/4)	Tennis	
2007	Switzerland	Roger Federer (3/4)	Tennis	
2008	Jamaica	Usain Bolt (1/3)	Athletics	
2009	Jamaica	Usain Bolt (2/3)	Athletics	
2010	Spain	Rafael Nadal	Tennis	
2011	Serbia	Novak Djokovic	Tennis	
2012	Jamaica	Usain Bolt (3/3)	Athletics	
2013	Germany	Sebastian Vettel	Formula One	
2014	Portugal	Cristiano Ronaldo	Football	
2015	New Zealand	Dan Carter	Rugby union	
2016	United States	Simone Biles	Gymnastics	
2017	Switzerland	Roger Federer (4/4)	Tennis	
BBC World Sports Personality of the Year winners
2018	Italy	Francesco Molinari	Golf	
2019	Kenya	Eliud Kipchoge	Athletics	
2020	Russia	Khabib Nurmagomedov	Mixed martial arts	
2021	Ireland	Rachael Blackmore	Horse racing	
2022	Argentina	Lionel Messi	Football	
2023	Norway	Erling Haaland	Football	
2024	Sweden	Armand Duplantis (1/2)	Athletics	
2025	Sweden	Armand Duplantis (2/2)	Athletics	

=== By nationality ===
This table lists the total number of awards won by place of birth.

Nationality	Number of wins^{[a]}
United States	18
Australia	8
Soviet Union	5 (Note: Of the recipients born in the Soviet Union: 1961 recipient Valeriy Brumel, and 1968 recipients Oleg Protopopov and Ludmila Belousova, were born in what is now Russia, and represented the Soviet Union.; 1972 recipient Olga Korbut was born in what is now Belarus, and also represented the Soviet Union.; 2020 recipient Khabib Nurmagomedov was born in what is now Russia. He became a citizen of Russia upon the collapse of the Soviet Union during his early childhood.)
Switzerland	4
Sweden	3
Germany	3
Jamaica	3
Brazil	2
Czechoslovakia	2 (Note: Of the recipients born in the former Czechoslovakia: 1987 recipient Martina Navratilova was born in what is now the Czech Republic. She fled to the US at age 18, and held only United States citizenship at the time of her award.; 1997 recipient Martina Hingis was born in what is now Slovakia. She moved to Switzerland at age 7.)
New Zealand	2
Portugal	2 (Note: One of Portugal's recipients, 1966 co-winner Eusébio, was born in Mozambique while it was still a Portuguese colony. He moved to mainland Portugal in his childhood.)
Spain	2
Yugoslavia	2 (Note: Of the recipients born in the former Yugoslavia: 2001 recipient Goran Ivanišević was born in what is now Croatia, and became a Croatian citizen upon the country's independence from Yugoslavia.; 2011 recipient Novak Djokovic was born in what is now Serbia, which became a completely separate country in the years after the breakup of Yugoslavia.)
Argentina	1
Austria	1
Barbados	1
Canada	1
Ethiopia	1
France	1
Ireland	1
Italy	1
Kenya	1
Romania	1
South Africa	1
Trinidad and Tobago	1
United Kingdom	1 (Note: 2023 recipient Erling Haaland was born in the United Kingdom, where his Norwegian father Alf-Inge Haaland was playing professional football. He holds citizenship in both countries and represents Norway.)

=== By sport ===
This table lists the total number of awards won by recipient's sporting profession.

Sporting profession	Number of wins^{[a]}
Tennis	17
Athletics	13
Golf	9
Football	6
Boxing	5
Cricket	3
Figure skating	3
Gymnastics	3
Formula One	2
Horse racing	2
Rugby union	2
Cycling	1
Rugby league	1
Mixed martial arts	1

=== By gender ===
This table lists the total number of awards won by gender.

Gender	Number of wins^{[a]}
Male	52.5
Female	8.5

== Note ==
- ^{a1} ^{a2} The fractions refer to occasions on which the awarded was shared between more than one person.

== See also ==
- Athlete of the Year
- Laureus World Sports Award for Sportsman of the Year (Laureus World Sports Academy)
- Laureus World Sports Award for Sportswoman of the Year
- L'Équipe Champion of Champions
