= Konnie Huq =

British television presenter and writer (born 1975)

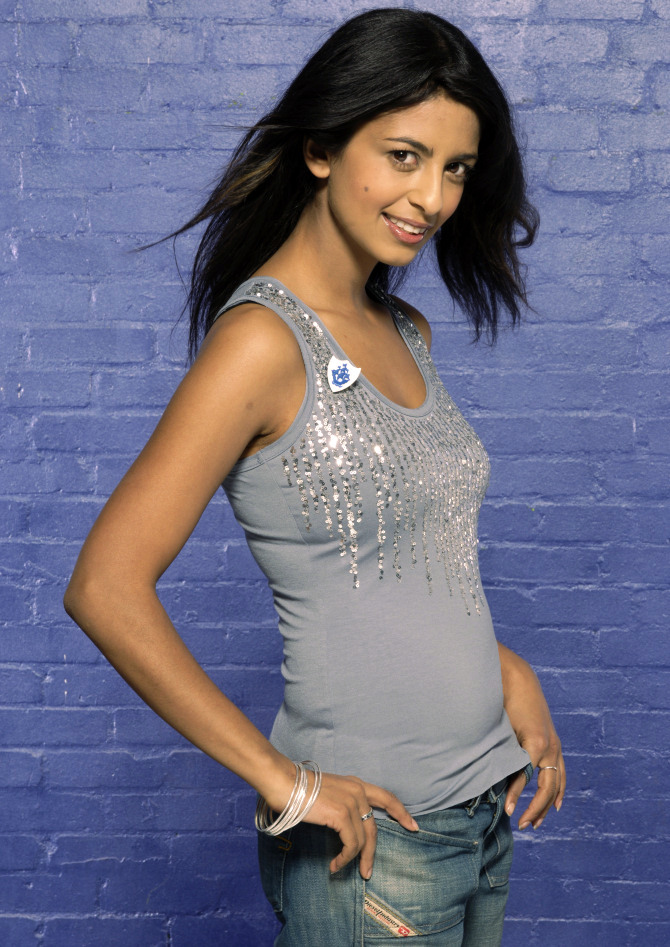
- Huq in 2006
- Born: Kanak Asha Huq; 17 July 1975 (age 51); London, England
- Education: Robinson College, Cambridge
- Occupations: Presenter, screenwriter, author
- Years active: 1991–present
- Spouse: Charlie Brooker (m. 2010)
- Children: 2
- Relatives: Rupa Huq (sister)
- Website: konnie-huq.com

Konnie Huq (born Kanak Asha Huq /ˈhʌk/, 17 July 1975) is a British television and radio presenter, screenwriter and children's author. She became the longest-serving female presenter of the British children's television programme Blue Peter, presenting it from 1997 to 2008. She has been a presenter and guest of shows including the 2010 series of The Xtra Factor on ITV2.

Huq co-wrote the Black Mirror episode "Fifteen Million Merits" with her husband, Charlie Brooker. Her children's book Cookie and the Most Annoying Boy in the World was published in 2019. She published the follow-up, Cookie and the Most Annoying Girl in the World, in 2020 along with her third children's book, Fearless Fairy Tales.

== Early life ==
Kanak Asha Huq was born in the Hammersmith district of London on 17 July 1975, the daughter of Muslim parents who emigrated from Pabna, Bangladesh, in the 1960s. She grew up in the Ealing district of London with her two elder sisters, Nutun, and future Labour Party politician Rupa. She attended Notting Hill & Ealing High School and obtained nine GCSEs, then gained A-levels in chemistry, mathematics, and physics. She went on to study economics at Robinson College, Cambridge, graduating with a 2:1 degree.

== Career ==
=== Early work ===
Huq trained part-time at the National Youth Music Theatre. In 1989, at the age of 14, she appeared with them on Blue Peter and sang a solo. The following year, she appeared alongside Jude Law in Captain Stirrick, a National Youth Music Theatre production.

Before the 1992 general election, Huq interviewed Labour leader Neil Kinnock for the children's programme Newsround, and appeared as a contestant on Blockbusters in the same year. She appeared as an uncredited extra playing a schoolgirl in the BBC1 sitcom 2point4 Children in the Series 2 episode "I'm Going Slightly Mad".

Her presenting debut, at the age of 16, was on the satellite television show TVFM. She then appeared on a GMTV Saturday morning children's quiz show called Eat Your Words between 1994 and 1996. She was assisted by Mark Speight before Simon Parkin took over. In 1997, several months before joining Blue Peter, Huq presented Channel Five's early morning children's programme Milkshake!

=== Blue Peter ===
Huq presented the BBC children's television programme Blue Peter, starting on 1 December 1997. Early in her term as a presenter, she visited the village in Bangladesh where earlier generations of her family lived. In the programme's 2004 Summer Expedition to India, Huq became an extra in the Bollywood film Musafir (2004), and practised dancing alongside its stars. For the programme's 2004 Welcome Home appeal, she visited Angola, hoping to reunite children and their families who had been separated due to war. In 2008, during her last programme, she broke a Guinness World Record by pinning 17 Blue Peter Badges onto fellow presenter Andy Akinwolere's shirt in a minute. In March 2007, she apologised on air on behalf of the programme to viewers, after the result of a competition to identify the celebrity owner of a pair of shoes was faked.

On 31 May 2007, Huq announced she would be leaving Blue Peter. On 22 January 2008, she hosted her final Blue Peter, with a clip show of her highlights through the ten years she had been on the programme. She is the third longest-serving Blue Peter presenter and its longest-serving female host, having passed Valerie Singleton's record on 1 October 2007. She holds the record for working with the most co-presenters while on the show, with a total of 10. These are Stuart Miles, Katy Hill, Romana D'Annunzio, Richard Bacon, Simon Thomas, Matt Baker, Liz Barker, Zoe Salmon, Gethin Jones and Andy Akinwolere.

=== Other work ===
==== Presenting and panel shows ====
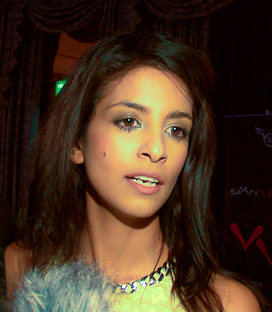
Huq in 2009

Between 2002 and 2004, Huq co-presented the CBBC Channel's UK Top 40 chart show and in early 2003 she was briefly a presenter for Top of the Pops. She presented GMTV's LK today coverage of New York Fashion Week on the week of 10 September 2007. In June 2007 she was a guest panellist on the comedy gameshow 8 out of 10 Cats.

In December 2007, Huq appeared on a celebrity version of Ready Steady Cook with Blue Peter co-presenter Andy Akinwolere. She began presenting the ITV1 London show London Talking, a political debate show, alongside Vanessa Feltz and Nick Ferrari in 2007, and co-presented some of the weekly Your News programmes for BBC News in 2008. Huq was the main presenter for the third series, in 2008, of Channel Five show Zoo Days, a documentary series about the animals and staff at Chester and Colchester Zoos. Huq presented The Red Bull Air Race with Dougie Anderson for Channel 4 in 2008.

Huq appeared with her future husband Charlie Brooker in his satirical review programme Screenwipe in December 2008 on BBC Four. She hosted a mock version of a "mission documentary" entitled Konnie's Great British Wee. She was a guest on political show This Week on 18 December 2008, appearing with M.P. Charles Kennedy.

She presented Guinness World Records Smashed with Steve Jones on Sundays on Sky1 in 2009. On 15 May 2009, Huq began to present entertainment show Hannah-Oke on The Disney Channel with Duncan James. The show was a "Hannah Montana themed karaoke-style game show". Huq presented the seventh series of The Xtra Factor on ITV2, replacing Holly Willoughby who was unable to fulfil the role due to her ongoing commitments at This Morning.

In February 2011, Huq appeared in an episode of the ITV2 documentary programme Under Pressure, where she attempted to learn how to be a rapper. Trailers for the show asked "Will Konnie Huq it up?" She was coached by Akala and performed at indigO2.

For two consecutive years she presented the Royal Shakespeare Company's Live from Stratford upon Avon, a web project aimed at showing theatre productions in schools. In July 2012, the project web-streamed a performance of I, Cinna (The Poet), a play by Tim Crouch about the poet in Shakespeare's play Julius Caesar killed by a mob after being mistaken for a conspirator. In November 2013 a recording of the Globe Theatre production of Richard II was shown in 3,000 schools. The performances were followed by a question-and-answer session hosted by Huq.

In May 2022 the BBC announced that Huq would be one of the guest presenters to take over Richard Osman's role on Pointless.

==== Radio ====
On 15 September 2006, Huq became one of the presenters of The Tube with Tony Wilson, Alex James and Emily Rose on Channel 4 Radio working with production company UKoneFM. The first edition was broadcast on 3 November 2006. Huq made her debut as a news presenter on the BBC Asian Network in September 2007, in a series of documentaries on a radio current affairs programme called the Asian Network Report. She presented an episode of Archive on 4 in 2010, reviewing forty years of Sesame Street. In 2013, she took part in the Radio 4 biographical series Great Lives, where participants select someone who has inspired them, and chose the 19th century English mathematician Ada Lovelace.

==== Cameo appearances ====
She appeared as herself in The Kumars at No 42 in 2001. In 2007, she had minor roles in The Sarah Jane Adventures episode "Invasion of the Bane", and in the CBBC series M.I.High episode "The Big Freeze". She played herself again in the FM episode "Golden Lady" in March 2009. She played a villainous servant (also called Konnie) in the last episode of the second series of Robin Hood.

In 2013, Huq played a presenter of the fictional telethon "Help a Blameless Child" in television comedy series A Touch of Cloth. In 2019, she appeared briefly as a breakfast television presenter of the in-universe show Pam & Sam in Good Omens, which was based on the book of the same name written by Neil Gaiman and Terry Pratchett.

==== Screenwriting and conferences ====
In December 2009, Huq won the Best Rising Star Screenplay Angel award at the Monaco International Film Festival for her screenplay Ahmed and Mildred, a story described as "a superhero themed journey into the imagination of two young infants as they experience love at first sight." In March 2014, Ahmed and Mildred was selected as one of the projects to receive funding from Film London to enable production to take place.

She co-wrote the second episode of the Channel 4 anthology series Black Mirror, "Fifteen Million Merits", which is a satire of entertainment shows, with her husband Charlie Brooker. An installation featuring extracts from the episode was installed at the Barbican Centre as part of the science-fiction themed exhibition "Into the Unknown" in 2017.

On 14 October 2014, Huq was one of the speakers celebrating Ada Lovelace Day at the Royal Institution. On 29 June 2016, Huq hosted VOOM 2016, a pitch competition, for Virgin Media Business.

==== Children's books ====
Her book for children Cookie and the Most Annoying Boy in the World was published in 2019 and is the first of a projected three-book series. The book centres around the fictional character Cookie Haque, a schoolchild who enjoys learning about science, and what happens when her best friend moves away, and a boy that Cookie considers the most annoying boy in the world moves next door. Huq wrote and illustrated the book. The character of Cookie has been described by Huq as "a cross between Wimpy Kid and Bridget Jones." A third book in the series was published in February 2022.

== Philanthropy ==
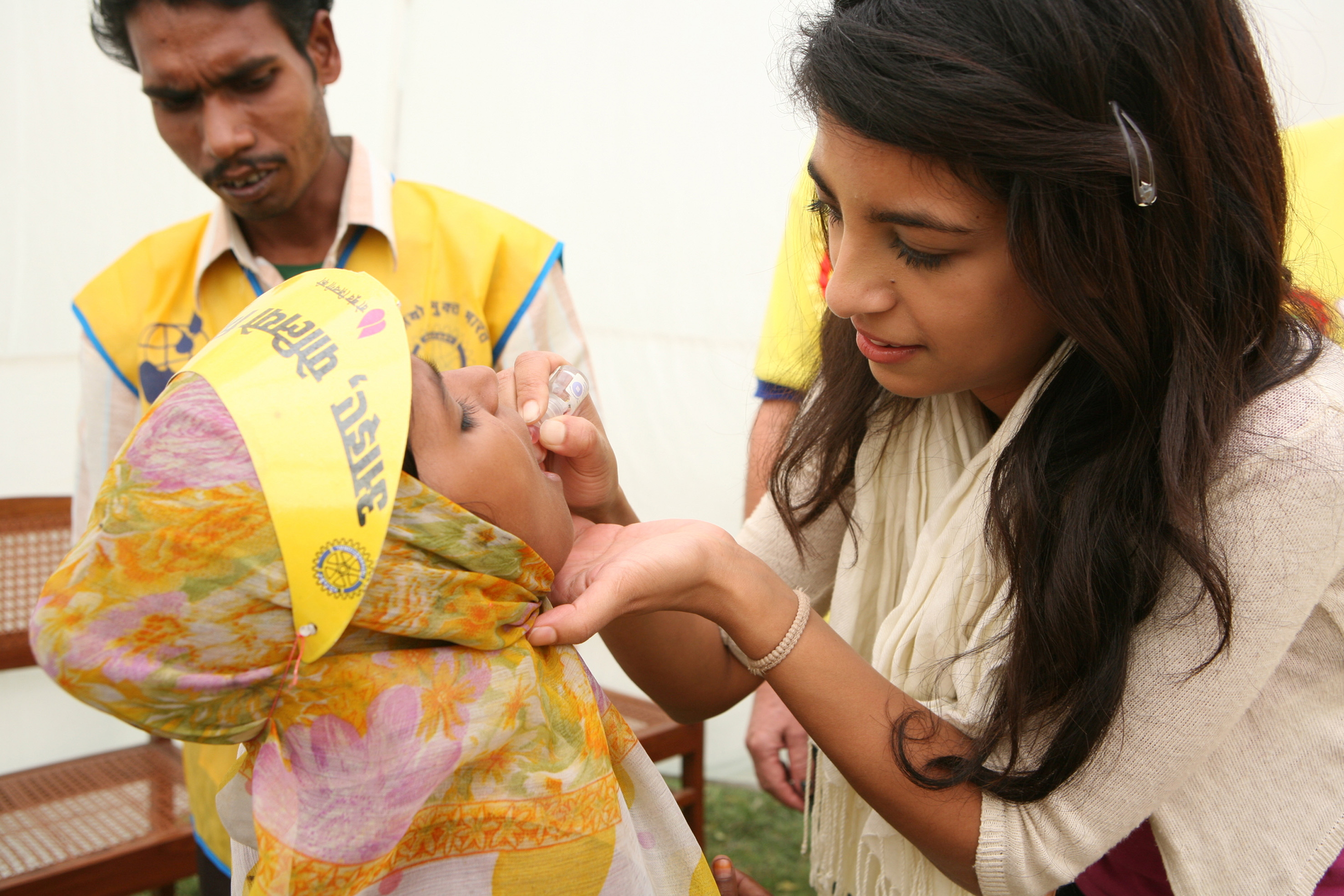
Huq administering a polio vaccine in Lucknow during a campaign to eradicate polio in India in 2009

In 2005, Huq took part in the BBC One fundraising show Comic Relief Does Fame Academy. She was the third contestant to be voted off, after her rendition of Kim Wilde's Kids in America. She travelled to Uganda and met orphaned children on behalf of Comic Relief.

Huq travelled to Afghanistan with the charity Afghanaid to film a BBC Lifelines appeal, which was aired on 21 September 2008, and the following year she travelled to India as part of Rotary International's "Thanks for Life/End Polio Now" campaign. She administered polio vaccine to children as part of the trip.

As a celebrity ambassador for the British Red Cross, Huq appeared in the 2009 video "If I had HIV, would you kiss me?" which was part of a campaign against the stigmatisation of people living with HIV and AIDS. She was an ambassador for Gold Challenge, part of the official mass participation legacy programme for the London 2012 Olympic Games.

== Personal life ==
On 26 July 2010, Huq married writer and satirist Charlie Brooker at the Little White Wedding Chapel in Las Vegas after a nine-month relationship. They have two sons. Huq has said she reduced her television commitments so that she could focus on her children.

Huq supported the Labour Party at the 2010 general election. Her sister, Rupa, was elected as the Labour MP for Ealing Central and Acton at the 2015 general election.

On 6 April 2008, Huq participated in the London leg of the Summer Olympics torch relay as one of 80 torch carriers on the torch's journey to Beijing. In Ladbroke Grove, a protester tried to grab the torch from her as she was about to hand it to the next runner. She was not hurt in the incident, though police wrestled the protester to the ground and arrested him.

== Filmography ==
Year	Title	Role	Ref.
1991	TVFM	Presenter	
1992	Blockbusters	Contestant	
1992	2point4 Children	Extra	
1994	Eat Your Words	Main presenter	
1997	The Mag	Presenter for Channel 5's youth show	
1997	Milkshake!	Main presenter alongside Lucy Alexander	
1997–2008	Blue Peter	Main presenter alongside various co-presenters	
2001	The Kumars at No 42	Herself	
2002–2004	UK Top 40	Main presenter alongside Adrian Dickson	
2005	Comic Relief Does Fame Academy	Contestant (out third)	
2006	The Tube	Main presenter alongside Tony Wilson, Alex James and Emily Rose	
2007	The Sarah Jane Adventures	Cameo appearance in the episode Invasion of the Bane	
2007	M.I.High	Minor character	
2007	8 out of 10 Cats	Panellist	
2007	New York Fashion Week	Main presenter for GMTV coverage	
2007	London Talking	Main presenter alongside Vanessa Feltz and Nick Ferrari	
2007	Robin Hood	A servant called Konnie	
2008	Your News	Main presenter alongside Laura Jones, Manish Bhasin and Adam Parsons	
2008	The Weakest Link	Contestant on Blue Peter special	
2008	UK School Games	Main presenter alongside Nigel Clarke	
2008	When Beauty Goes Wrong	Main presenter	
2008	Charlie Brooker's Screenwipe	Presenter of the mock documentary in Episode 4 "Konnie's Great British Wee"	
2008	Are You Smarter Than A 10 Year Old?	Contestant	
2008–2009	Zoo Days	Presenter of the Colchester edition of the show	
2009	Noel's HQ	Reporter	
2009	Guinness World Records Smashed	Main presenter alongside Steve Jones	
2009	Hannah-Oke	Main presenter alongside Duncan James	
2009	The Wright Stuff	Panellist for the Week	
2009	The Daily Politics	Guest reporter	
2009	Jack Osbourne: Adrenaline Junkie	Celebrity participant	
2010	The Archive Hour: Open Sesame	Guest reporter	
2010	The Xtra Factor	Main presenter from Series 7	
2010	Mind Your Language	Main presenter	
2010	71 Degrees North	Contestant Series 1	
2010	This Week	Guest reporter	
2010	Shocked Britain	Main presenter	
2011	Lonely Planet	Reporter	
2011	Would I Lie to You?	Guest panellist	
2011	Under Pressure	Herself	
2012	The Real Hustle: Celebrity Chancers	Celebrity Hustler	
2012	Pointless Celebrities	Contestant paired with Angellica Bell	
2012	Celebrity Blockbusters	Contestant	
2012	This Week	Guest reporter	
2013	Daybreak	Guest reporter	
2013	A Touch of Cloth Series II	Herself	
2013	Great Lives	Episode 31: Ada Lovelace	
2015	King of the Nerds	Main Presenter	
2015	This Morning	Guest	
2015	Sunday Brunch	Guest	
2016	The One Show	Presenter	
2016	The Penguin Podcast	Podcast interview with James Oswald	
2017	The Penguin Podcast	Podcast interviews with Tom Fletcher, Harriet Harman, Jo Nesbo and Carlo Rovelli	
2019	Good Omens	Pam	
2019	Harry Hill's Alien Fun Capsule	Herself	
2019	Sunday Brunch	Herself	
2020	Great British Menu	Herself	
2020	Charlie Brooker's Antiviral Wipe	Herself (also Autocue Op and Hair and Make-up)	
2021	Sunday Brunch	Herself	
2022	Mandy	Herself, Episode: SpaceMandy	
2023	Pointless	Herself	
2025	The Hack	Mr Apollo 2	
2025	Dexter Proctor: The 10-Year Old Doctor	Ms. Saeed	

== Bibliography ==
Year	Title	Publisher	ISBN
2020	Cookie and the Most Annoying Boy in the World	Piccadilly Press	ISBN 978-1-8481-2809-5
2020	Cookie and the Most Annoying Girl in the World	Piccadilly Press	ISBN 978-1-8481-2893-4
2020	Fearless Fairy Tales	Piccadilly Press	ISBN 978-1-8481-2811-8
2022	Cookie and the Most Mysterious Mystery in the World	Piccadilly Press	ISBN 978-1800782006

== See also ==
- List of British Bangladeshis
