= Ore Oduba =

British television and radio presenter

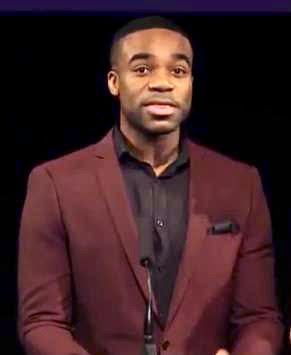
- Oduba in 2018
- Born: 17 November 1985 (age 40); London, England
- Occupation: Presenter
- Notable credit(s): Newsround; BBC Sport; Claimed and Shamed; Match of the Day Kickabout; The One Show; The National Lottery Draws; Strictly Come Dancing; And They're Off! Hardball; Noughts + Crosses
- Spouse: Portia Jett Culmer (m. 2015; div. 2025)
- Children: 2
- Website: http://oreodubaofficial.com

Ore Oduba (born 17 November 1985) is a British television and radio presenter who has also worked as an actor. From 2008 until 2013, he presented the CBBC news programme Newsround. He won the fourteenth series of BBC One's Strictly Come Dancing in 2016. In 2018 he hosted the game show And They're Off! in aid of Sport Relief. In 2019 he began his musical theatre career, starring in the UK tour of Grease. He also appeared alongside Jason Manford in Curtains the Musical. Oduba made his West End debut in January 2020.

== Early life and education ==
Oduba was born on 17 November 1985 in London, to Nigerian parents and was brought up in Wimborne Minster, Dorset, in southwest England, with his brother and two sisters. He often travelled between the UK and Nigeria, where his father is a leading lawyer. He was educated at Dumpton School, then Canford School, a co-educational independent school for both boarding and day pupils in the village of Canford Magna, near to the market town of Wimborne Minster in Dorset.

Oduba was a talented sports player in his youth, he was a rugby prop, a hockey goalkeeper, also played tennis and cricket.

He studied Sports Science and Social Science at Loughborough University and graduated with a degree in 2008.

== Career ==
Oduba had always aimed for a career in sports broadcasting, and initially joined The Network, an Edinburgh television festival scheme.

Oduba joined Newsround in August 2008, following the departure of Lizo Mzimba and Laura Jones. His first role on the programme was as a reporter and breakfast bulletin presenter. He was quickly promoted to deputy presenter in 2009, filling in for main presenter Sonali Shah in her absence. In 2010, he joined Shah to begin presenting the main Newsround bulletin double-headed. This continued until Shah's departure in November 2011. He was later joined by reporters Leah Gooding and Hayley Cutts. As part of his role he also presented spin-off show Sportsround. He became the main presenter in October 2008 when the show relaunched. He presented until its cancellation in 2010. The show was replaced by Match of the Day Kickabout, which Oduba also presents. Oduba left Newsround in 2013.

Oduba formerly presented the sport for BBC Breakfast and BBC Radio 5 Live. He has also presented and reported on British Olympic Dreams along with former Newsround co-presenter Sonali Shah. Oduba began a debut presenting solo on the morning slot for the 2014 Commonwealth Games on BBC One and BBC Sport.

Oduba regularly appeared on CBBC studio presentation following his Newsround shift. He was also a guest on CBBC shows including Sam & Mark's TMi Friday, Hacker Time and All Over the Place.

In the lead up to the 2012 Summer Olympics Oduba presented a programme called Ultimate Sports Day for CBBC. He also co-presents live cinema relays from the Royal Opera House, Covent Garden, with former ballerina Darcey Bussell.

On 2 March 2013, Oduba and Sonali Shah appeared on the BBC's Let's Dance for Comic Relief, dancing to Hey Ya! by Outkast. They were eliminated and did not get through to the final.

He played the role of Nathan in Hacker Time on CBBC. Since 2015, he has guest presented numerous episodes of The One Show.

From 2015 to 2016, he was a presenter on The National Lottery Draws on Saturday evenings and he presented the 2015 New Year Live programme on BBC One.

From 7 March 2016, Oduba took part in a challenge for Sport Relief, called "Hell on High Seas", in which he sailed 1,000 miles from Belfast to London with five other celebrities including Alex Jones and Suzi Perry. In 2016, he also presented Sport Relief: Clash of the Titans with Dan Walker. He presented coverage of the 2016 Summer Olympics on BBC Four throughout August 2016.

Between October 2012 and May 2017 he presented the daytime BBC One insurance fraud documentary programme Claimed and Shamed. In November 2016, Oduba guest-presented an episode of This Morning with Holly Willoughby on ITV. He returned to present a second episode with Willoughby in March 2017 and a third with Davina McCall in February 2018.

In 2016 Oduba participated in the fourteenth series of Strictly Come Dancing, where he was partnered with Joanne Clifton. The couple's American Smooth to "Singin' in the Rain" won praise from Patricia Ward, widow of Gene Kelly. In the fourth week, the couple were awarded a score of 39 points out of 40 for their jive to "Runaway Baby" by Bruno Mars. In the final, on 17 December, after the couple scored the maximum 40 points for their jive, they were announced as the winners.

In 2017, Oduba sat in for Claudia Winkleman and Steve Wright, on their respective BBC Radio 2 shows, on a number of occasions.

In 2018, Oduba presented Saturday-night game show And They're Off! For Sport Relief on BBC One. Subsequently, he co-hosted the main coverage of Sport Relief 2018 live on BBC One. The same year, he co-presented Britain's Favourite Walks: Top 100 alongside Julia Bradbury for ITV. Oduba also hosts the BBC One game show Hardball.

Oduba made his musical theatre debut in 2019, playing the role of Teen Angel in the UK tour of Grease. He shared the role with singer Peter Andre. Following that, Oduba starred as Aaron Fox in Kander and Ebb's Curtains alongside Jason Manford and Carley Stenson. The production later transferred to London's Wyndham's Theatre, where Oduba made his West End debut.

In 2020, Oduba played the role of news anchor Akintola in the BBC One drama Noughts + Crosses, a television adaptation of the novels by author Malorie Blackman.

The following year, he was a contestant in Channel 4's Celebrity SAS: Who Dares Wins, making it to the final. In the same year, he joined the cast of the stage version of The Rocky Horror Show.

== Personal life ==
In November 2015, Oduba married TV researcher Portia Jett Culmer, daughter of Nick "Animal" Culmer, lead singer of punk rock band Anti-Nowhere League. They have two children. In January 2024, Portia revealed that the couple were divorcing.

In July 2017, he received an Honorary Doctorate from Loughborough University. In November that year, he received an Honorary Doctorate of Arts from Bournemouth University. He is an avid supporter of Manchester United.

Oduba was the first winner of the Inspirational Public Figure Award at the inaugural Ethnicity Awards held in 2018. Other nominations included Meghan Markle, Chiwetel Ejiofor and Alesha Dixon.

== Credits ==
=== TV ===
Year	Title	Role	Channel
2008–2010	Sportsround	Presenter	CBBC
2008–2013	Newsround	Presenter	CBBC
2011–2013	Match of the Day Kickabout	Presenter	CBBC
2011-2014	Hacker Time	Guest, various characters	CBBC
2011–2016	BBC Breakfast	Sport presenter	BBC One
2012	Ultimate Sports Day	Presenter	CBBC
2013	Let's Dance for Comic Relief	Contestant	BBC One
2014	All Over the Place Australia	Co-presenter	CBBC
2015	EastEnders: Backstage Live	Co-presenter	BBC One
2015	New Year Live	Presenter	BBC One
2015–2016	The National Lottery Draws	Main presenter	BBC One
2015–2016	Victoria Derbyshire	Sport presenter	BBC Two
2015—	The One Show	Guest presenter	BBC One
2016	Sport Relief: Clash of the Titans	Co-presenter	BBC One
2016	Hell on High Seas	Participant	BBC One
2016	Strictly Come Dancing	Participant	BBC One
2016	Claimed and Shamed	Presenter	BBC One
2016–2018	This Morning	Guest presenter	ITV
2017	London Marathon Highlights	Presenter	BBC Two
2017	BBC Young Dancer	Co-presenter	BBC Two
2017	One Love Manchester	Co-presenter	BBC One
2017	World Athletics Championships 2017	Co-presenter	BBC One/BBC Two
2017	The National Lottery Awards	Presenter	BBC One
2018	And They're Off!	Presenter	BBC One
2018	Britain's Favourite Walks: Top 100	Co-presenter	ITV
2018	Hardball	Presenter	BBC One
2018	The Royal Wedding of Prince Harry and Meghan Markle	Presenter	BBC One
2021	Celebrity SAS: Who Dares Wins	Contestant	Channel 4
2021	The Cube	Contestant	ITV

=== Television guest appearances ===
- Hacker Time (2011)
- The Dog Ate My Homework (2014)
- Celebrity Mastermind (2014)
- Play to the Whistle (2017)
- Extra Gear (2017)
- Weekend (2017)
- Celebrity Juice (2017)
- The Crystal Maze: Celebrity Special (2017)
- Dara O Briain's Go 8 Bit (2017)
- Partners in Rhyme (2017)
- Tim Vine Travels in Time (2017)
- Celebrity Antiques Road Trip (2017)
- Would I Lie to You? (2017)
- Through the Keyhole (2018)
- Celebrity Catchphrase (2018)

=== Radio ===
Year	Title	Role	Station
2017	Claudia on Sunday	Stand-in presenter	BBC Radio 2
2017	Steve Wright in the Afternoon	Stand-in presenter	BBC Radio 2
2018	Drive-time	Stand-in presenter	BBC Radio 2
2019-	Vanessa Feltz	Stand-in presenter	BBC Radio 2

=== Stage ===
Year(s)	Production	Role	Theatre	Location
2017	Strictly Come Dancing the Live Tour	Contestant	—N/a	UK National Tour
2018	Strictly Come Dancing the Live Tour	Host	—N/a	UK National Tour
2019	Strictly Come Dancing the Live Tour	Host	—N/a	UK National Tour
2019	Grease	Teen Angel	—N/a	UK National Tour
2019	Curtains the Musical	Aaron Fox	—N/a	UK National Tour
2019-20	Cinderella	Prince Charming	Fairfield Halls	Croydon
2020	Curtains the Musical	Aaron Fox	Wyndham's Theatre	West End
2021	Rocky Horror Show	Brad Majors	—N/a	UK National Tour
2022	Sleeping Beauty	Prince Orlando	Marlowe Theatre	Canterbury
2023	Pretty Woman	Happy Man/Mr Thompson	—N/a	UK National Tour
2023	Snow White and the Seven Dwarfs	Prince Charming	Royal & Derngate	Northampton
2024	Aladdin	Abanazar	Assembly Hall	Tunbridge Wells
2025	Chitty Chitty Bang Bang	Caractacus Potts	—N/a	UK National Tour
2025	Picture You Dead	Stuart Piper	—N/a	UK National Tour
2025	Young Frankenstein	Frederick Frankenstein	Hope Mill Theatre	Manchester
2025	Snow White and the Seven Dwarfs	Prince Charming	The Hawth	Crawley
