= Cardiff Business School =

British university department

- Welsh: Ysgol Fusnes Caerdydd
- Type: Business school
- Established: 1987
- Parent institution: Cardiff University
- Affiliations: AACSB, AMBA
- Dean: Tim Edwards
- Students: 3,000
- Location: Cardiff, Wales; 51.4877°N 3.1790°W
- Website: Official website

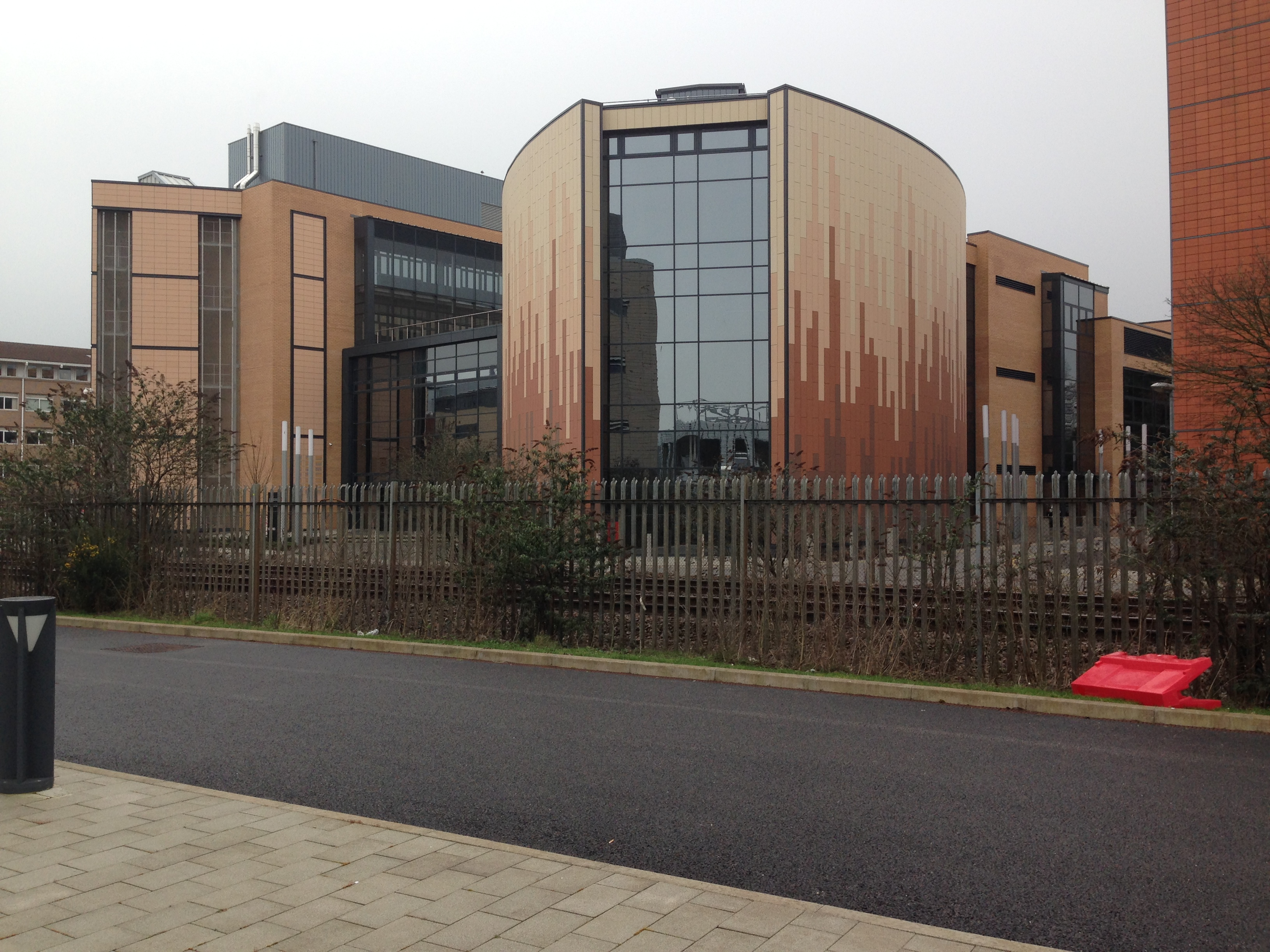
Cardiff Business School.

Cardiff Business School (Welsh: Ysgol Fusnes Caerdydd) is the business school of Cardiff University in Cardiff, Wales. It was created in its current form in 1987 and opened by Queen Elizabeth II. Cardiff Business School currently serves 3,000 students a year, 700 of whom are postgraduate students. The school's research programme is Economic and Social Research Council (ESRC) recognised and has 140 PhD students currently studying within the school. Its research informs organisations such as the Foreign and Commonwealth Office, the United Nations, HM Treasury, the Department for Business, Innovation and Skills and the Department for Communities and Local Government and working on consultation projects for blue-chip, global firms.

Some notable staff include Leighton Andrews, New Keynesian economist Huw Dixon, accounting historian John Richard Edwards and neoclassical economist Patrick Minford.

== History ==
=== Economics at University College Cardiff (1899-1988) ===
Economics is the oldest part of the business school, having been taught at Cardiff since the late 1890s as part of the Political Science department and corresponding degree. The "Department of Economics and Political Science" was set up in 1903 with one lecturer, Henry Jevons (the son of William Stanley Jevons) who was made Professor in his final year 1911. From 1911 to 1946 the head of department was W.J. Roberts. In 1922, he was joined by Stanley Parris. In 1946, professor Brinley Thomas CBE became head of the department and there followed an expansion with the subjects covered to include statistics and accounting. By 1962, there were seven lecturers in the department, and in 1972 Sir Bryan Hopkin became the second professor among 11 lecturers. In 1973, Professor Ken D. George became the head of department and there was further expansion. In 1988, as a result of the merger of UCC with University of Wales Institute of Science and Technology, the economics department at University College Cardiff moved into the recently created Cardiff Business School.

=== Research Assessment Exercise – RAE 2008 ===
Cardiff Business School was ranked fourth in the 2008 Research Assessment Exercise – RAE in 'Business and Management Studies' subject area. 70 per cent of the School's research was judged to be either world-leading or internationally excellent.

=== Research Excellence Framework – REF 2014 ===
Cardiff Business School was ranked sixth across the UK in the 2014 REF category "Business and Management Studies" on the basis of the overall grade point average (GPA). 86 per cent of its research was judged to be either world-leading or internationally excellent.

== Notable alumni and academics ==
- Ambika Anand, anchor, NDTV
- Paul Atherton. Television and Film Producer
- David Blanchflower, academic and former member of the Monetary Policy Committee at the Bank of England
- Spencer Dale, chief economist at the Bank of England
- Sue Owen, Permanent Secretary, Department for Culture, Media and Sport
- Gavin Ramjaun, television presenter and journalist
- David Smith, economics editor of The Sunday Times and author.

== Deans of Cardiff Business School ==
- 1985–2005: Roger Mansfield
- 2005–2010: Robert McNabb
- 2010–2012: George Boyne
- 2012–2018: Martin Kitchener
- 2018–2024: Rachel Ashworth
- 2024-present: Tim Edwards
