= Lizzie Greenwood-Hughes =

British journalist and television presenter

Elizabeth Greenwood-Hughes (née Greenwood) (born January 1973) is an English television presenter working for the BBC. She is currently a regular presenter of sports news on the BBC News Channel and the BBC Weekend News.

== Education ==
She studied film and photography at Salisbury College of Art, which became Wiltshire College.

== Presenting career ==
After working on BBC South Today she presented Newsround, the children's current affairs show on BBC One between 2001 and 2008. She co-presented the show's 30th Anniversary edition with original presenter John Craven. She then went on to present Sportsround on BBC Two from 2005, with co-host Jake Humphrey.

Moving to sports presenting, she was part of the BBC's presenting line-up at the 2006 Melbourne Commonwealth Games, the 2008 Beijing Olympics and Paralympics and the 2006 Turin and 2010 Vancouver Winter Olympics.

She then worked on The Football League Show, a highlights show covering all the lower English leagues on Saturday night.

== Personal life ==
In 2005, Greenwood married Geraint Hughes, a former BBC News Sports Correspondent, who later joined Sky Sports. They have two children. They also have a rescue dog called Schafernaker, named after BBC weather colleague, Tomasz.

She once played for the England mixed hockey team and plays for her local club. She regularly jogs with her dog, and has completed a London Marathon.
