= Children's news program =

News program aimed at children

A children's news program is a type of news program that is specifically aimed at children, usually 6–14 years olds, rather than an adult audience. The programme is usually made by the network's news and current affairs department, rather than the children's department.

As the programme is aimed at a much younger audience from ordinary adults focused news programme, there are significant differences in the style and make-up of the programme. These are for example: the programme has news stories that children would be interested in, usually avoiding deep political and business news and more dealing with popular cultures such as music and television. The programme is presented in with much lighter tone, with the language being much simpler and less complex and has graphics and sounds that are much more colourful.

Usually, the news presenters are much younger than regular news presenters and acting in a much more informal environment than regular newscasters, with casual clothing and either standing or sitting on a chair, rather than behind a desk. Some presenters use the programme in the past as a platform to later work as a formal newscaster or correspondent.

== History ==
No one network is responsible for the creation of a news programme aimed at children. CBS first broadcast a series of news clips aimed at children in 1971 under the title of "In the News". However, in 1972, the first channel to broadcast a new segment for children was by the BBC with John Craven's Newsround. Accounts tended to avoid the political emphasis of adult news and instead sought to build an ‘'interesting'’ agenda. In the same year, Sweden's SVT started broadcasting a weekly news roundup programme called Barnjournalen (Children's Journal). Later the Netherlands' NOS created a children's show Jeugdjournaal (Youth Journal) in 1981.

== List of current and former children's news programs ==
=== Current shows ===
| Country | Program Name | Network | Former networks | First date of broadcast |
|---|---|---|---|---|
| Argentina | Paka Data | Pakapaka | | 2019 |
| Australia | BtN | ABC Me | ABC | 1968–2003; 2005–present |
| Belgium (Dutch) | Karrewiet | Ketnet | | 2002 |
| Belgium (French) | Niouzz | OUFtivi (La Trois) | | 2000 |
| Canada (English) | CBC Kids News | CBC Television | | |
| Canada (French) | MAJ | Ici Radio-Canada Télé | | |
| China | 新闻袋袋裤 | CCTV-14 | CCTV-7 | 2001 |
| Denmark | Ultra Nyt | DR Ultra | | 2013 |
| France | ARTE Journal Junior | Arte | | |
| Germany | logo! | KiKa | ZDF | 1988 |
| Germany | ARTE Junior das Magazine | Arte | | 2014 |
| Ireland | News2day | RTÉ2 | | 2003 |
| Ireland (Irish) | Nuacht Cula4 | Cúla4 TG4 | | 2023 |
| Netherlands | Jeugdjournaal | NPO Zapp | Nederland 1, Nederland 2, Nederland 3, Z@ppelin | 1981 |
| New Zealand | News 2 Me | TVNZ 2 | | 2021 |
| Norway | Supernytt | NRK Super | 2010 | |
| Spain (Catalan) | Info K | X3 | K3 (2001–2009); Canal Super3 (2009–2022) | 2001 |
| Sweden | Lilla Aktuellt | SVT Barn | SVT1 | 1994 |
| United Kingdom (English) | Newsround | CBBC | BBC One | 1972 |
| United Kingdom (Welsh) | Newyddion NI | S4C | | 2023 |
| United States | Nightly News Kids Edition | NBC | | 2020 |

=== Former shows ===
| Country | Program Name | Original Network | Other Networks | Broadcast |
|---|---|---|---|---|
| Australia | Ttn | Network 10 | | 2004-2008 |
| Philippines | RPN NewsWatch Kids Edition | RPN | | 1979–1993 |
| Philippines | Junior Patrol | ABS-CBN | | 1990–1992 |
| Philippines | RPN Jr. NewsWatch | RPN | | 2004–2005 |
| Sweden | Barnjournalen | TV1 | SVT1 | 1972–1991 |
| United Kingdom | Newsround Showbiz | CBBC | | 2001–2005 |
| United Kingdom | Sportsround | CBBC | | 2005–2010 |
| United States | In the News | CBS | | 1971–1986; 1996–1997 |
| United States | 30 Minutes | CBS | | 1978–1982 |
