= Sonali Shah =

British television and radio presenter (born 1980)

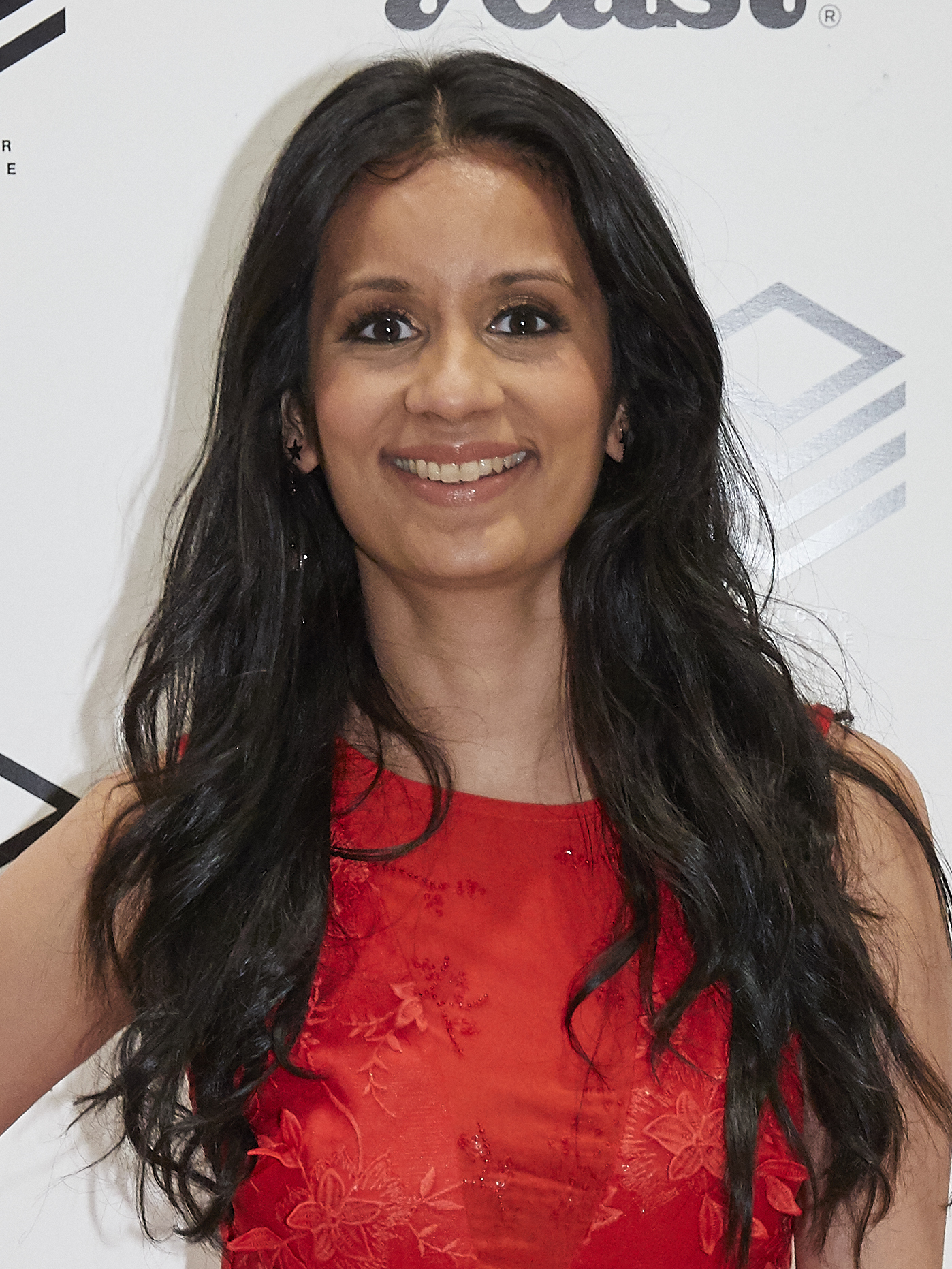
- Shah in 2018
- Born: Sonali Gudka; 26 July 1980 (age 46); Edgware, London, England
- Education: Nottingham Trent University
- Occupations: Journalist and radio and television presenter, reporter
- Notable credit(s): Newsround; Escape to the Country; Watchdog; The National Lottery Draws; Crimewatch

Sonali Shah (born 26 July 1980) is a British television and radio broadcaster who currently presents Sunday Breakfast on Magic Radio as well as BBC television programme Escape to the Country, ITV1's Tonight and had her own segment on Channel 4's Steph's Packed Lunch.

She is well known for presenting the BBC's children's news programme Newsround from July 2006 until November 2011. Some other notable programmes Shah has presented are The National Lottery Draws, Crimewatch and Watchdog.

== Early life ==
Sonali Gudka was born in Edgware, London to immigrant Indian parents, who run a pharmacy. Shah trained as a dancer for over 10 years, studying Indian classical, Indian folk and Streetdance. She attended Longfield First and Middle School, and went on to Nower Hill High School in Harrow. She studied broadcast journalism at the Centre for Broadcasting and Journalism at Nottingham Trent University.

== Career ==
Aiming for a career in medicine, Shah began presenting on the local hospital radio. After university, in early 2002 she joined BBC World Service as a producer, also presenting on World Business Report and The World Today. In 2002, she moved to BBC Radio 5 Live as launch producer for Jeff Randall's Weekend Business, which won a Sony Radio Award. She then began reporting for Weekend Business, as well as Wake Up to Money and 5 live Money.

=== Newsround ===
Shah joined Newsround initially as an afternoon relief presenter. From 2006, as part of a new team replacing Ellie Crisell and Jake Humphrey, she presented breakfast, afternoon and weekend bulletins for the show as well as presenting the main programme from 2008. Shah also reported for Sportsround, and posted an online diary from the 2010 Commonwealth Games for the Newsround website. She made a number of Newsround Specials, including two documentaries from Afghanistan in 2010, which were also shown on the BBC News Channel. In 2011 she guest presented Match of the Day Kickabout on BBC Two, and made guest appearances on Sadie J and Blue Peter.

On 9 November 2011, Shah announced she was leaving Newsround before it moved to its new base at MediaCityUK in Salford.

=== BBC Sport ===
In 2010, Shah went to Delhi, to present coverage of the Commonwealth Games for BBC Sport on BBC One and BBC Two. She was one of the main reporters for the events coverage.

She was one of three BBC presenters, along with Manish Bhasin and Rishi Persad, at the 2011 Cricket World Cup in the Indian sub-continent. Also in 2011, she reported from the University Boat Race. and Wimbledon. She regularly presents a special programme for BBC One called British Olympic Dreams, broadcast since February 2011, that follows the Britain's potential Olympic hopefuls for 2012. She also anchored daytime coverage on BBC Three during the games as well as being stationed at Lords for the archery.

=== BBC News ===
In 2009, Shah made a move to the BBC News Channel's Business News on top of Newsround. She can be seen occasionally broadcasting in the afternoon and evening.

In August 2011, Shah moved to BBC World News. She presented the daytime bulletin on the weekend and remains a relief presenter. In December 2011, she stood in for Rhod Sharp on Up All Night. She focuses on BBC News and BBC Sport.

Shah was among the BBC News team for the Diamond Jubilee of Queen Elizabeth II coverage on BBC One. Shah was a reporter from the crowds at The Mall.

In May 2014, Shah became a sports reporter for Today, the daily morning news programme for BBC Radio 4.

=== Other ===
On 2 March 2013, Sonali Shah and her Newsround co-presenter Ore Oduba appeared on the BBC's Let's Dance for Comic Relief, dancing to "Hey Ya!" by Outkast. They were eliminated, and did not get through to the final.

In 2014, Shah became a presenter of house-buying BBC TV show Escape to the Country. She also presented the spin-off to this programme, "Escape to the Perfect Town" and "I Escaped to the Country".

In August 2016, Shah covered for sports presenter Matt Williams on BBC Radio 2 during Simon Mayo Drivetime 3-week summer break.

In April 2021, Shah began presenting the Sunday Breakfast show on Magic Radio.

She follows the Jain faith. She was one of the seven public figures who entered the Pilgrimage series, in 2024, following the North Wales Pilgrim's Way.

In April 2026, Shah began presenting the Sunday Morning show on Magic Classical replacing Simon Mayo.

== Personal life ==
Shah resides in London with her husband Adarsh and their children, daughter Ariana (born October 2013), and son Rafi (born October 2016). She is 5 ft 1 in (155 cm) tall and "needs heels for interviewing tall sportspeople".
