= Lucy Mathen =

British-Indian doctor and former journalist

- Born: 1953 (age 72–73); India
- Occupation: Ophthalmologist

Lucy Mathen (born 1953) is an Indian-born British ophthalmologist and former journalist. Having initially worked for the BBC, she retrained as a doctor and launched Second Sight – a non-profit organisation aimed at eradicating curable blindness in India's poorest state, Bihar.

== Career ==
Mathen began her career as a print journalist, working for the Surrey Mirror in the mid-1970s. She became the British Broadcasting Corporation's first female British Asian to front a major national television programme in 1976 when she began working for John Craven's Newsround (the BBC's children's news series). She was the programme's first dedicated reporter – others, such as the anchorman John Craven, also appeared in other presenting roles for the BBC. She worked on Newsround from 1976 to 1980. During this period, Samira Ahmed, now a prominent British Asian broadcaster, found Mathen an inspiration.

During the making of a documentary on women in Afghanistan in 1988, a conversation with a local doctor made her reconsider her journalistic role: "I suddenly felt like a bit of a fraud. That's when I vowed that if I were ever in a war zone again, I would be a medic and not a reporter". At the age of 36, she retrained as a doctor at St. George's Hospital Medical School in London. She chose ophthalmology as her specialty. After taking part in a surgical training course in India in 1996, she saw the effects of blindness caused by cataracts. She launched a non-profit organisation – Second Sight – in December 2000 to bring eye surgeons into the rural north India where the problem was most acute. In 2012 she received the inaugural Karen Woo award from the British Medical Journal for the charity's work in Bihar. In 2020, in spite of the Covid pandemic and lockdowns, over 43,000 people had their sight restored by Second Sight working with small community eye hospitals all over the state of Bihar. The total number of blind people who have benefitted from the charity's work is now well over half a million.

Mathen has written about her change of career and the first 10 years of the charity's work in a book called A Runaway Goat: Curing Blindness in Forgotten India. A sequel called Outgrowing the Big: Sight for India's Blind and A New Way of Seeing the World was published in June 2019. Simon Barnes called Outgrowing the Big a "triumph ... humanity is the super-power that has allowed the charity Second Sight to punch way above its weight in 18 years."

Mathen plays football, and has incorporated the encouragement of women's football in India as part of a programme discouraging child marriage. She is also a runner and completed three London Marathons and a half-marathon, and a triathlon raising money for Second Sight in the process.

In 2017, she set up the FAME project, to eliminate vitamin A deficiency and the resulting blindness in children in one of the most deprived areas of rural Bihar. FAME stands for Food, Vitamin A, Measles vaccination, and Education. FAME was a collaboration with local social workers - the Canossian Sisters at Motihari - the people of Basman village, the local government doctor and Second Sight. FAME demonstrated that all arms of the programme had to be meticulously implemented in order to eliminate this leading cause of childhood blindness.

In July 2022, Mathen's medical school, St. George's University of London, conferred on her an honorary degree of Doctor of Medicine for services to Ophthalmology.
