= Gavin Ramjaun =

British journalist

- Born: Gavin Ramjaun; 13 December 1981 (age 44); Worcester, Worcestershire, England
- Education: Cardiff Business School; City University London
- Occupations: Journalist, presenter
- Notable credit(s): Newsround; Sportsround; BBC News; Daybreak

Gavin Ramjaun (born 13 December 1981) is a British journalist known for his work with the BBC, Sky Sports and ITV Breakfast. His parents hail from Mauritius. He was born in Worcester.

== Education ==
Ramjaun was educated at the University of Cardiff's Cardiff Business School, where he obtained two degrees, followed by City University London, where he obtained a Postgraduate Degree in Journalism.

== Broadcasting career ==
Ramjaun joined the Newsround team in 2007 as a replacement for Thalia Pellegrini. Since then he presented a wide variety of reports and the main 5:00pm programme. His role was primarily as a Breakfast and weekend presenter. He also presented items on the Newsround spin-off show Sportsround.

In 2009, Ramjaun left Newsround to join BBC News. He joined the BBC's Breakfast team and regularly made special reports for the show. He also presented sport news on the BBC News Channel. Ramjaun was part of the BBC Sport reporting team at the 2010 Winter Olympics in Vancouver, Canada.

In September 2010, Ramjaun joined ITV's newly launched Daybreak as a news correspondent, on 6 December 2011 he became a sports correspondent, on 31 August 2012 he moved on from the show.

He has since rejoined the BBC Sport, working as a correspondent and working as one of the BBC Breakfast sport presenters.
