= And They're Off! =

BBC game show

- Also known as: And They're Off!... for Sport Relief
- Genre: Game show
- Presented by: Ore Oduba
- Starring: Daryll Neita
- Narrated by: Dave Lamb
- Country of origin: United Kingdom
- Original language: English
- No. of series: 1
- No. of episodes: 6

Production
- Running time: 40 minutes
- Production company: STV Studios

Original release
- Network: BBC One
- Release: 6 January – 17 February 2018

And They're Off! (also known as And They're Off!... for Sport Relief) is a British television programme hosted by Ore Oduba with commentary from Dave Lamb and demonstrations from Daryll Neita and is shown on BBC One, featuring contestants predicting which celebrity will win a physical challenge to raise money for Sport Relief. The show features contestants in the BBC Pacific Quay studio answering questions to bet on which celebrity will win in a physical challenge. If their celebrity loses, they go home. The winner wins a prize donated to Sport Relief, for example: Cirque du Soleil tickets.

== Format ==
There are five contestants. To start, they are given a series of questions. If they answer correctly, they get to choose which celebrity they think will win a physical challenge. If their celebrity loses, both the contestant and the celebrity leave. This repeats with different challenges until the final.

In the final, all 5 celebrities return for a final challenge. The remaining contestant must answer four questions and for every question they get correct, they can choose another celebrity they think will win. If one of the celebrities they choose wins, the contestant wins a prize.

== Episodes ==
Episode	Air date	Celebrities (winner in bold and in order of place finished)
01x01	6 January 2018	**Michael Owen**; Mike Tindall; Ollie Locke; Carrie Grant; Saira Khan
01x02	13 January 2018	**Helen Glover**; Steve Backshall; Yasmin Evans; Charles Venn; Stacey Solomon
01x03	20 January 2018	**Michael Vaughan**; Michelle Ackerley; Mike Bushell; Una Healy; Penny Lancaster
01x04	27 January 2018	**Ben Cohen**; Russell Kane; Martin Offiah; Jenny Powell; Frankie Bridge
01x05	10 February 2018	**Iwan Thomas**; Maggie Alphonsi; Richard Arnold; Rav Wilding; Amber Davies
01x06	17 February 2018	**Sam Quek**; Tyger Drew-Honey; Martin Roberts; Sharron Davies; Zoe Lyons
