= Paul Welsh (journalist) =

Paul Welsh is a British television and radio correspondent and presenter. He was born in England in 1961, but moved frequently because his father was a serving member of the RAF. He studied Physics at the University of Nottingham from 1979 to 1982.

== Career ==
Welsh is best known for coverage of conflicts and disasters; particularly the civil wars in Kosovo, Ivory Coast and Liberia, and the famines in Somalia and Sudan. Roles for the BBC included World Affairs Correspondent, West Africa Correspondent, Defence & Security Correspondent, TV Duty Editor, presenter of the World Service programmes Newshour and The World Today, and reporter/presenter on the television programmes Breakfast and Newsround. Welsh has presented BBC programmes on BBC One, BBC Two, BBC News 24, BBC World Service and BBC World TV. He reported for the BBC on all of those and Radio 1, Radio 2, Radio 4, BBC Three and BBC Four.

A founding member, and former station manager, of University Radio Nottingham he reported freelance for the city's commercial station Radio Trent. Professionally he has worked for Centre Radio in Leicester, Pennine Radio in Bradford, Radio Aire in Leeds and Radio City in Liverpool. He wrote a number of articles for The Independent in the 1990s.

He left full-time work at the BBC in 2006 and now runs a production company called Mosquito Media.

== Awards ==
Welsh won a Royal Television Society award for a documentary on the Somali famine and the Premier Award of the One World Broadcasting Trust for reporting from Sudan.
