= Your News =

British television news programme

Your News is a weekly BBC News television programme that was made from user-generated content sent into the BBC by viewers and the public.

== Broadcast ==
The programme was broadcast every weekend on the BBC News at 3:30 pm and 10:30 pm on Saturday and Sunday. Usually, the current episode could be watched on the BBC News website as well as on BBC iPlayer.

The pilot, filmed in Welwyn Garden City, was first broadcast on 25 November 2006. Every week the programme was shot in different locations around the UK, which included Carlisle, Belfast, Manchester and Barnstaple.

== Presenters ==
Your News was fronted by various BBC presenters including Amanda Davies, Konnie Huq, Laura Jones, James Dagwell, Manish Bhasin, Adam Parsons, Thalia Pellegrini and Alex Stanger. The final Your News was broadcast on the weekend of 20 and 21 December 2008 and was presented by Adam Parsons and Laura Jones.
