= Ambika Anand =

Indian TV anchor and fashion consultant (born 1980)

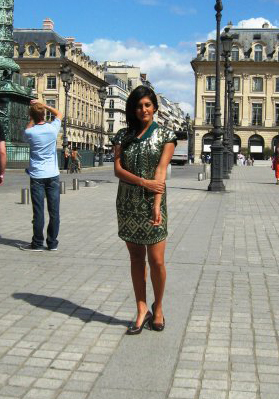
- Born: 15 September 1980 (age 46); Chandigarh, India
- Education: Delhi University; Cardiff Business School
- Occupations: Journalist, News presenter
- Employer: NDTV

Ambika Anand (born 15 September 1980) is an Indian TV anchor and fashion consultant. She has previously anchored shows like Eyes on Style, Band Baajaa Bride Season 7, Big Fat Indian Wedding, I'm Too Sexy For My Shoes, and I'm Too Sexy – All Access. and hosted The Ambika Anand Show on her YouTube channel.

== Early life and career ==
Born in Chandigarh, she is daughter of Anil P Anand and Jayshree Anand, she completed her schooling from Delhi Public School & graduated from Jesus and Mary College, Delhi University. She earned a Diploma Degree in Economics from the Cardiff Business School.

Anand joined NDTV on 8 December 2002 and worked for their show India Business Report, a weekly programme that was produced for the BBC. After close to two years of working with NDTV, she went and worked for the Department of Communication of the International Labour Organization in Geneva.

In December 2005, she rejoined NDTV and worked on several programmes in her capacity as reporter and anchor, including Hot Property, Boss's Day Out and Value for Money. She also anchored live business news on the channel.

Anand turned to fashion and wedding related programming in 2007 and joined NDTV's lifestyle channel, Good Times. She worked on a series of hit programs like Big Fat Indian Wedding, 10 Things To Do Before You Say Bye, Vanity No Apologies, The Inside Story and I Am Too Sexy For My Shoes.

Continuing with her foray in this genre, she began anchoring a new show Band Baja Bride in 2011, a bride makeover show where she performed the part of mentor. She also hosted The Fast and the Gorgeous, a reality show, in the same year.

== Awards and honours ==
- Was on Verve's India's best dressed list in 2009, 2010
- Her show I'm Too Sexy For My Shoes also won the Best Lifestyle & Fashion Show for 2010 at the Indian Telly Awards
- Awarded Cosmopolitan India's Fun Fearless Female TV Personality Award 2011
- 10 Things to do before you say Bye! - London - A show that Anand was a part of, won the award for Outstanding Broadcast Feature at VisitBritain Media Awards 2011
- Band Baajaa Bride, a show that Anand hosted won Best Lifestyle Show at the Indian Telly Awards 2011
- Was on the list of HT City Delhi's Most Stylish 2013
- In 2019, The Colombo Fashion Week show was sent as an entry by NDTV 24x7 for Best Fashion And Lifestyle Show for Indian Television Awards 2019 and won in that category. Ambika had scripted and anchored the show!

== YouTube ==
In 2019, she started her own YouTube channel and launched The Ambika Anand Show.
