= Bridget Christie =

English writer and comedian (born 1971)

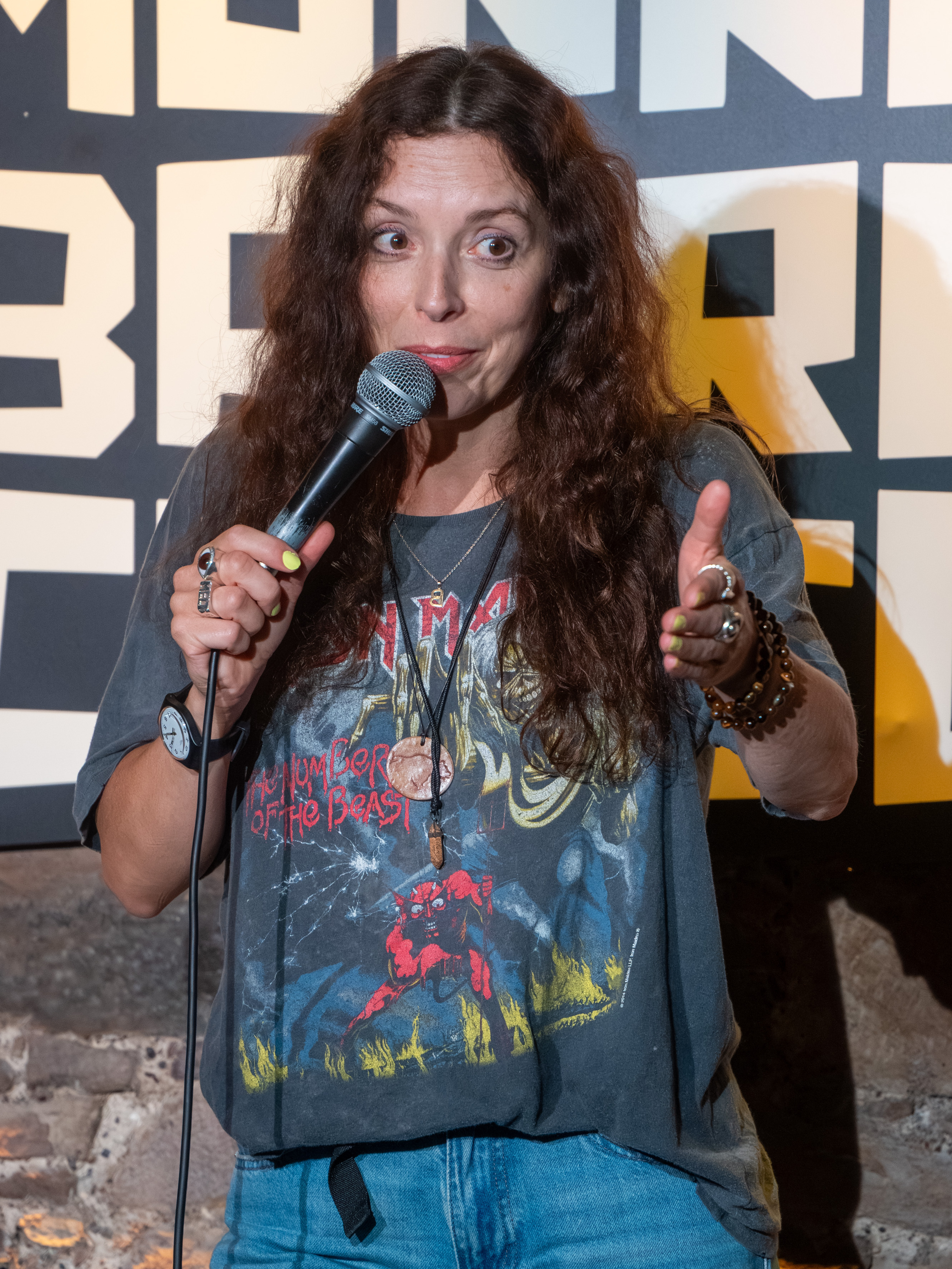
- Christie at the 2025 Edinburgh Festival Fringe
- Born: Bridget Louise Christie; 17 August 1971 (age 55); Gloucester, England
- Education: Academy of Live and Recorded Arts (BA)
- Occupations: Stand-up, actress, writer
- Years active: 2003–present
- Spouse: Stewart Lee (m. 2006; sep. 2021)
- Children: 2
- Website: bridgetchristie.co.uk

Bridget Louise Christie (born 17 August 1971) is an English stand-up comedian, actress and writer. She has written and performed comedy tours, in addition to radio and television work. She has been nominated for a BAFTA.

== Early life and education ==
Christie grew up in Gloucester in the south-west of England, the youngest of nine siblings born to parents from the west of Ireland: her father, Peter Christie, was from Boyle in the north of County Roscommon, while her mother, Mary Anne (née Kelly), was from Manorhamilton in the north of County Leitrim. Her parents had met in London, before moving to Gloucestershire, when her father got a job with the Wall's ice cream company. Two of her siblings later served in the Royal Air Force.

Christie attended St Peter's Roman Catholic High School in Gloucester, leaving at the age of 15 without qualifications. In 1994, she won a three-year scholarship to study drama at the Academy of Live and Recorded Arts (ALRA) in Wandsworth, London.

== Career ==
Christie appeared in theatre productions and adverts before she began stand-up in 2004. She was one of the finalists in the Funny Women Awards that year, won by Zoe Lyons. She was described by the show's founder Lynne Parker as "one of the most influential funny women who has ever entered our competition".

Her debut BBC Radio 4 series, Bridget Christie Minds the Gap, was broadcast in April 2013. A second series was broadcast in January 2015, followed by a third, Bridget Christie's Utopia, in January 2018. The three series were well received and won the Best Radio award at the 2014 Chortle Awards and the 2014 Rose D'Or International Broadcasting Award.

Her debut book, A Book for Her, was published in July 2015 to acclaim from The Daily Telegraph and The List and The Observer. The paperback was released in February 2016 and the Spanish version in Barcelona in March 2017.

Christie has written for The Sunday Times, The Times, The Independent and The Observer. She had a weekly column in Guardian Weekend magazine from October 2015 to March 2016.

In 2015, she won a Red Magazine Women of the Year Award and a Marie Claire Women at the Top Award.

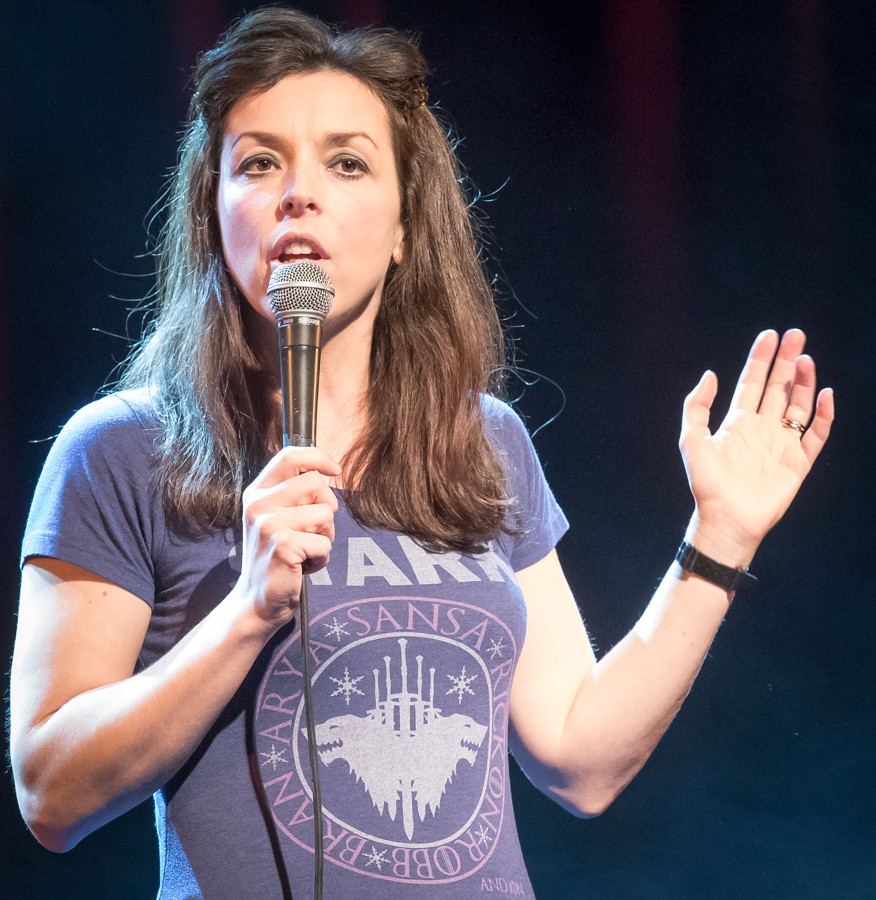
Christie in 2017 (House Stark t-shirt)

In May 2016, Christie recorded her debut screen stand-up special, Stand Up for Her (Live from Hoxton Hall), produced by Baby Cow Productions. It was released direct to Netflix on 31 March 2017.

She has written and performed 13 solo shows. The majority originated at the Edinburgh Festival and include A Bic for Her, An Ungrateful Woman and her Brexit-themed Because You Demanded It, which was The Guardian's No 1 Comedy of the Year 2016.

In 2020, she was a finalist for Best Scripted Comedy (Longform) in the BBC Audio Drama Awards.

=== Television appearances ===
Christie's TV appearances include comedy programmes It's Kevin (BBC Two), QI, The Omid Djalili Show (BBC One), Harry Hill's Little Cracker (Sky), Anna and Katy (Channel 4), The Culture Show (BBC Two), Mel & Sue (ITV), Alan Davies: As Yet Untitled (Dave). and Have I Got News for You (BBC One) for which she was nominated for a 2014 British Comedy Award for Best Female TV Comic, the Alternative Comedy Experience (Comedy Central), Room 101 (BBC One), Cardinal Burns (Channel 4), Celebrity Squares (ITV), This Week (BBC One) and Harry Hill's Alien Fun Capsule (ITV). In 2020, she appeared in BBC1's comedy Ghosts as Annie, a ghost who said four words. She reprised the role in 2022.

Christie was a contestant in series 13 of Taskmaster (Channel 4), which first aired in April 2022. She finished 3rd in the series with a total score of 157 points.

==== The Change ====
Christie's first television series The Change premiered on Channel 4 in June 2023. In the show, Bridget plays Linda, who finds a new lease of life when she learns she is undergoing menopause and heads to the forest on a journey of self-discovery. The Change was produced by Lisa Mitchell and executive-produced by Christie, Nerys Evans and Morwenna Gordon. A second series followed in March 2025. Christie was nominated for the British Academy Television Award for Best Female Comedy Performance for The Change.

=== Radio ===
Work for BBC Radio 4 and others includes Andy Zaltzman's History of the Third Millennium, Miranda Hart's House Party, It's Your Round, Sarah Millican's Support Group, The Fred MacAulay Show, Dan Tetsell's The 21st Century for Time Travellers, The Now Show, Kerry’s List, It's Not What You Know, Dilemma, French and Saunders' Christmas Show, and The Casebook of Max and Ivan. In 2019 she became curator of the museum on the Radio 4 series The Museum of Curiosity.

==== Mortal ====
First broadcast in 2021, her four-part series for BBC Radio 4, Mortal, won the 2022 BBC Audio Drama Award. Mortal was a series about life and death which she recorded herself from home during COVID lockdown.

==== Utopia ====
In her 2018 BBC Radio 4 show Utopia, Christie addressed world events – Kim Jong-un, the melting polar ice caps, the Brexit negotiations and Nick Knowles singing a cover of The Beatles’ “Here Comes The Sun”. It was recorded in front of a studio audience at the BBC Radio Theatre. Christie was joined by special guests Mike Christie, Leyla Hussein, Sister Agatha & Fran Blockley.

==== Bridget Christie Minds The Gap ====
In 2013, Bridget's first BBC radio series was broadcast on Radio 4, covering her personal take on feminism, asking why it became a dirty word and whether women still need it, featuring token man Fred MacAulay. A second series was released in 2015, followed by a Christmas Special, Bridget Christie's Christmas List.

=== Podcasts ===
Christie has appeared on the podcasts Danielle Ward's Do The Right Thing, Richard Herring's Leicester Square Theatre Podcast, Pappy's Flatshare Slamdown, Jarlath Regan's An Irishman Abroad, Stuart Goldsmith’s The Comedian’s Comedian, The Adam Buxton Podcast, The Penguin Podcast with Richard E. Grant, Literary Death Match, Off Menu with Ed Gamble and James Acaster, the Spotify podcast We Need to Talk About, and The Harry Hill Show.

== Solo stand-up shows ==
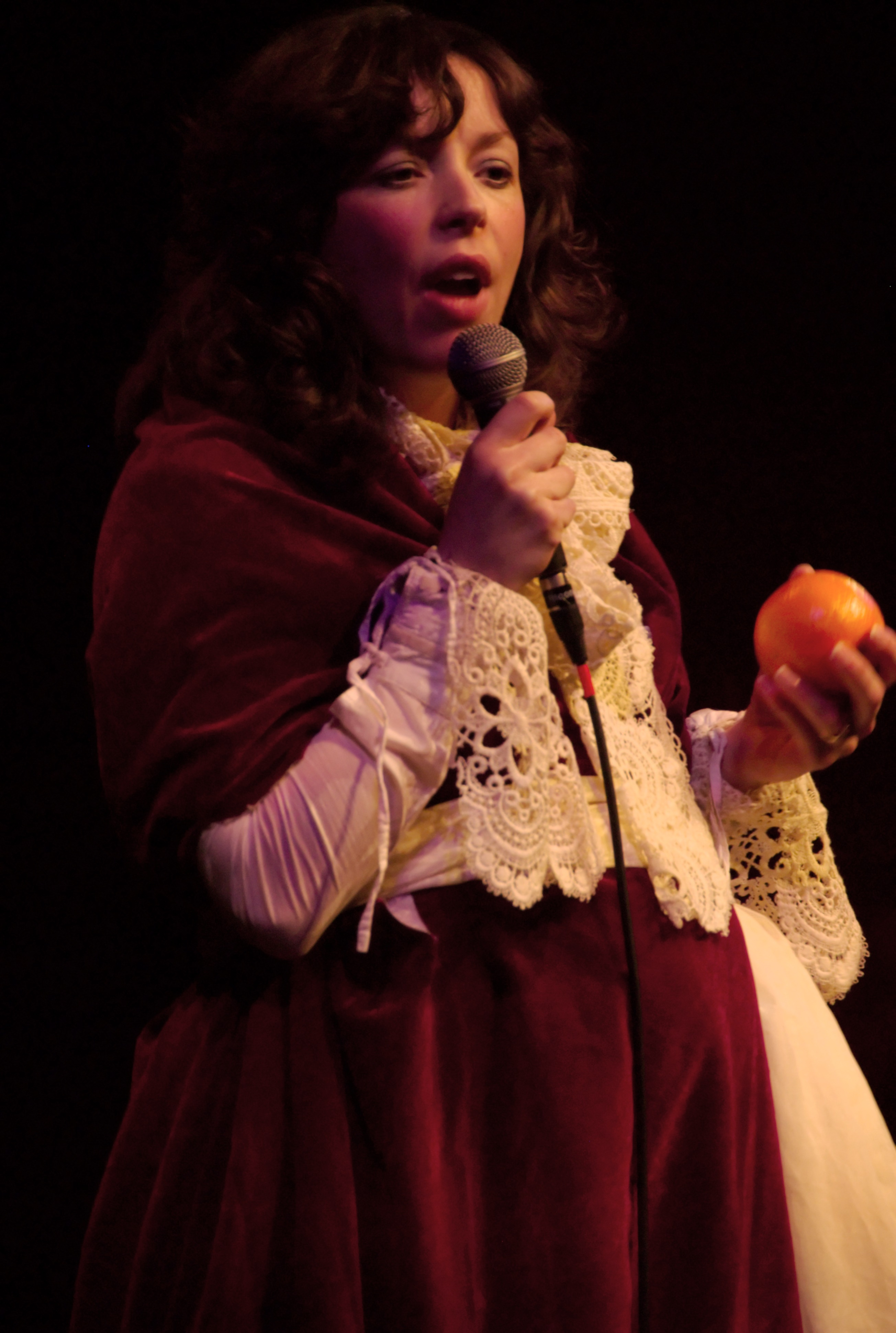
Christie as King Charles II in 2007

- Jacket Potato Pizza (2026)
- Who Am I? (2021/2023)
- What Now? (2018)
- Mortal (2016/2017)
- A Book for Her (2015)
- An Ungrateful Woman (2014)
- A Bic for Her (2013)
- War Donkey (2012)
- Housewife Surrealist (2011)
- Bridget Christie / A Ant (2010)
- My Daily Mail Hell (2009)
- The Court of King Charles II – The Second (2008)
- The Court of King Charles II (2007)
- The Cheese Roll (2006)

== Appearances in other shows ==
- White Rabbit, Red Rabbit, Edinburgh Fringe (2011)
- Celebrity Autobiography, Edinburgh Fringe (2010) and Leicester Square Theatre
- The School for Scandal, Edinburgh Fringe (2009)

== Television appearances ==
- Things You Should Have Done (2025)
- Would I Lie to You? (2024)
- The Change (2023–2025)
- Taskmaster Series 13 (2022)
- Ghosts (2020–2022)
- QI (2018–2024)
- Alan Davies: As Yet Untitled (2016)
- Sky Comedy Christmas Shorts (2015)
- Have I Got News for You (2013–2014)
- It's Kevin (2013)
- Anna & Katy (2013)
- Cardinal Burns (2012)
- Little Crackers (2011)
- The Omid Djalili Show (2009)

== Awards ==
- Marie Claire – Women at the Top Awards 2015 – winner
- Red magazine Women of the Year Awards 2015 (Creative) – winner
- South Bank Sky Arts Award for Best Comedy for A Bic for Her (2014) – winner
- Edinburgh Comedy Award for Best Show with A Bic for Her (2013) – winner
- Funny Women Best Show Fringe Award for The Court of King Charles II (2007) – winner

== Personal life ==
Christie is Catholic. She married comedian Stewart Lee in 2006, and the couple had two children before separating amicably in 2021.
