= Paul Atherton =

English producer

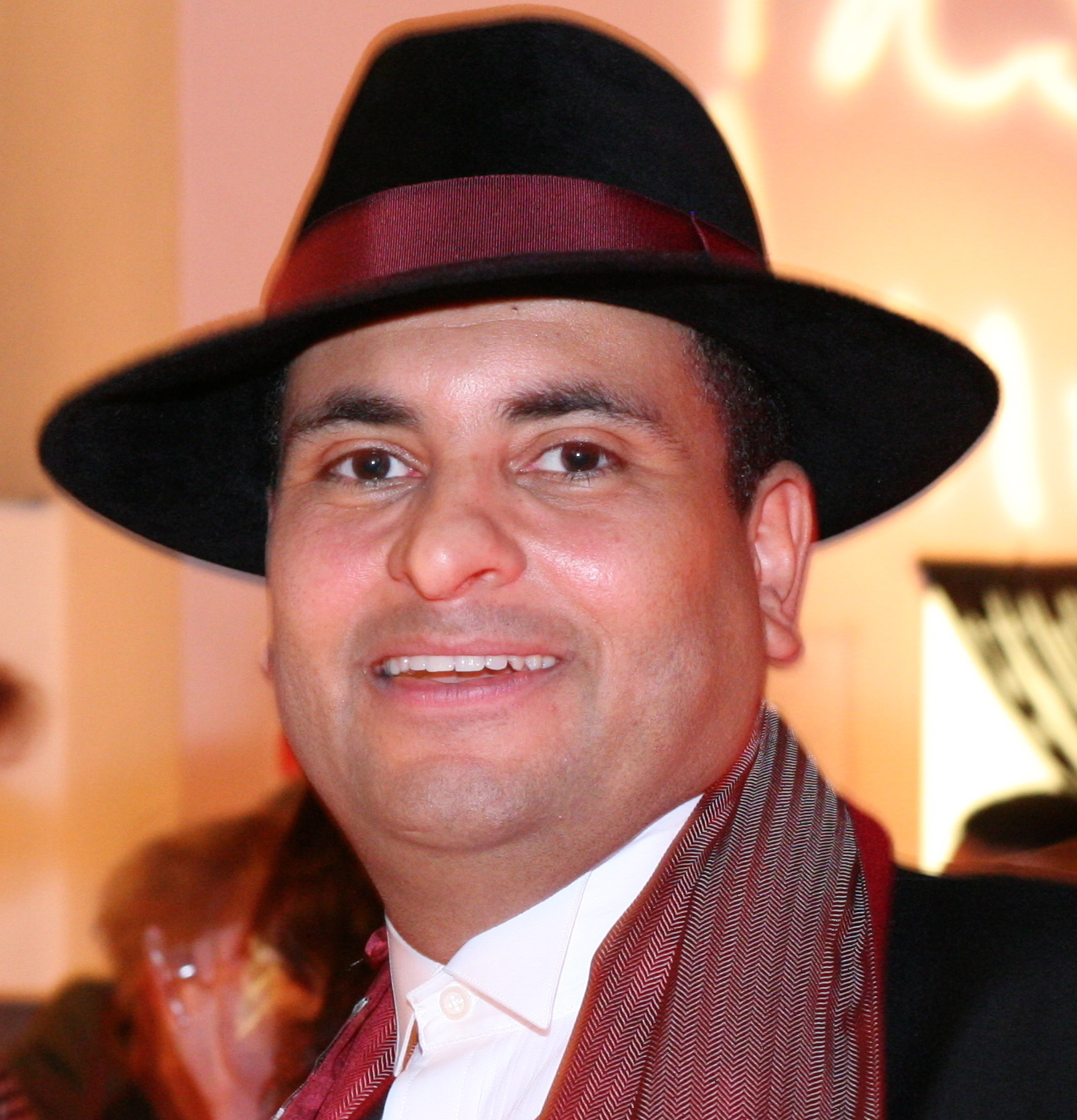
- Paul Atherton, 2008
- Born: 20 March 1968 (age 58); Cardiff, Wales
- Occupation: filmmaker

Paul Atherton (born 20 March 1968) is a London-based filmmaker. He produced and directed The Ballet of Change, a series of four short films that were projected onto London landmarks. His video-diary Our London Lives is in the permanent collection of the Museum of London. In April 2026, he was awarded the Freedom of the City of London.

== Early life ==
Atherton was three months old when he was abandoned in a tent at a disused airport in Cardiff but placed with a white foster family shortly after. Atherton grew up in the village of Ystrad Mynach in South Wales. He left home at 15, when he spent time in children's homes, and at 16 set up home on his own against the wishes of Social Services and started work on a Youth Training Scheme in Howells (department store). He was appointed the Welsh Young Conservatives Press Officer later that year and focused on addressing the issues of homelessness with a programme working with Sixth Forms in schools in Cardiff.

He is a graduate of Cardiff Business School.

== Career ==
In 2002, Atherton got his start in filmmaking with a four-week apprenticeship at British cookery channel UK Food and UK Style. He set up his own production company Simple TV Production in 2004.

Then in 2005, Atherton served as producer of Silent Voices, a television docudrama about domestic violence, which premiered on the Community channel (UK) and was later reissued as a DVD to raise funds for the National Centre for Domestic Violence.

=== The Ballet of Change ===
The Ballet of Change is a series of four films (approximately 4 minutes) produced and directed by Atherton in 2007. Funding was provided by the National Lottery Heritage Fund. Atherton got permission to premiere each films at the landmark in question (Piccadilly Circus, Trafalgar Square, Leicester Square and London Bridge). Music specially written for the films was available for download from a website, and many of the 600 people who watched the screening in Piccadilly Circus brought MP3 players with them for this purpose. Atherton said that his purpose in creating the films was to make available to a wider audience the images hidden in archives, so that more people could engage with London's history. The film about Piccadilly Circus was the first film ever shown on the Piccadilly Circus Coca-Cola billboard.

=== Colour Blind 2009 ===
In 2009 Atherton produced the short film Colour Blind 2009 directed by Amanda Baker which premiered at the British Urban Film Festival the same year. Starring Wil Johnson and Robert Cavanah it explores the issue of skin colour and stereotyping through the eyes of its protagonists.

=== Our London Lives ===
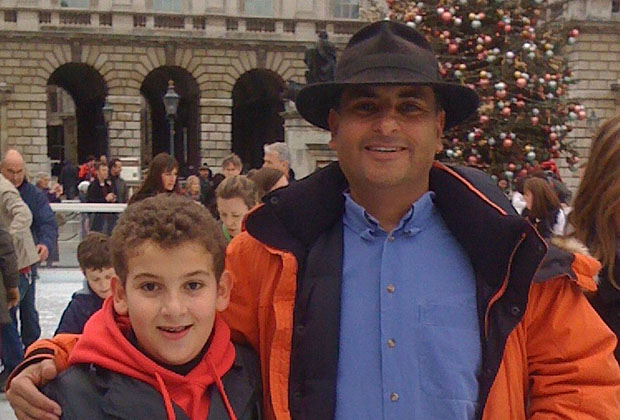
Paul Atherton and his son on the Ice Rink of Somerset House in their video diary Our London Lives

In 2016 Atherton's video-diary, tracking sixteen years of his son's visits from his home in South Wales to see him in London, was edited down from over 300 hours of footage to a 77-minute film. Entitled Our London Lives the film screened as part of the exhibition "Recording A Life" in the Show Space area of the Museum of London. After the exhibition the film was taken into the museum's permanent collection.

== Personal life ==
Atherton has chronic fatigue syndrome, which has required him to use a wheelchair. As of 2023, Atherton was housed in a Central London hotel at the expense of Westminster City Council, which said it had offered him a permanent accommodation elsewhere but been refused by Atherton, who said the hotel suited his disability better. On the 22nd April 2026 he was awarded Freedom of the City of London at The Guildhall, London. Atherton said, "To have this given to me whilst I‘ve got holes in my shoes and I haven’t got a penny to my name, there is no greater honour."
