= Silent Voices (2005 film) =

- Written by: Barbara Gorna
- Starring: Karina Cornell; Vicky Taylor-Roberts; Amanda Wright; Isla Molnar; Sarah Applewood; Robert Cohen; Amy Dodd; Claire Rimell; Damani Richards
- Music by: Damian Coldwell
- Country of origin: United Kingdom

Production
- Producer: Paul Atherton
- Running time: 50 minutes

Original release
- Network: Community Channel (UK)
- Release: 2005 – 2007

Silent Voices is a 2005 docudrama about domestic violence in the United Kingdom written for the Community Channel by Barbara Gorna "based on interviews with over 100 people affected by domestic violence in the UK," according to the British Film catalogue. The film weaves together seven stories presented as monologues by seven actors.

The film was directed by Charles Harris and produced by Paul Atherton. The music was written by Damian Coldwell.

In 2008 Silent Voices was released as a DVD. Part of the proceeds for each sale went to the National Centre for Domestic Violence.

DVD Monthly called the film "an eye-opening experience." Empire Magazine gave it 3 stars of a possible 5, calling it a "stark uncompromising look at the realities of domestic violence."

== See also ==
- Domestic Violence Documentaries
