= Terry Baddoo =

American sports presenter

Terry Baddoo is a television executive and a former TV host. He is half-English and half-Ghanaian, and lives in the United States.

== Biography ==
Baddoo was born in London, England, and earned a bachelor's degree in Education from London University. He began his journalistic career as a features writer with Custom Car magazine in England, and later worked for IPC magazines and on the launch of Britain's first colour newspaper, Today.

In the mid-1980s he worked in BBC Schools television, then hosted the news and current affairs show Black Londoners on Radio London. Later, he joined BBC TV as a reporter and presenter of the BBC children's news programme, Newsround, for which he reported from numerous global events, such as the fall of the Berlin Wall, the end of apartheid in South Africa, and the Barcelona Olympics. He subsequently worked for BBC News as a sports reporter and presenter on BBC Breakfast News and BBC World, and later freelanced for the satellite TV channel Sky as a football reporter and rugby features producer.

From 1995, he was the main U.S-based sports anchor for CNN International's World Sport, writing and presenting live daily news and feature shows on the day's top sports stories from CNN Center in Atlanta, and reporting from the field at many major sporting events. He also provided sports bulletins and commentary for all the CNN International News shows, and was a regular columnist on the CNN World Sport website. In 1999, Baddoo was noted as working at Sports Illustrated.

Baddoo left CNN International in March 2011, doing his final sign-off on March 31. He went on to host the international English language coverage of the London Olympics for Chinese State Television on CCTV News. In 2014 he was recruited by BeIN SPORTS to become Director of Sports Programming for the network's US operation in Miami, Florida.

== Personal and family ==
Baddoo is married with three children. He says interviewing Pele, Franz Beckenbauer, Johan Cruyff, and Sir Alex Ferguson are his fondest football moments along with being bought a drink by the late George Best.

His maternal grandmother appeared in the first television broadcast from London's Alexandra Palace. His father was an actor. His sister, Deborah, earned an OBE for her work as a choreographer and arts director. His brother-in-law is the Grammy-nominated producer, John Saxon.

During his time at Newsround in the 1980s, he lived in Colliers Wood.
