= The Penguin Podcast =

Interview podcast

The penguin podcast

Presentation
- Genre: society and culture podcast, arts podcast

Production
- No. of episodes: 235

Publication
- Ratings: 4.1/5

Related
- Website: https://www.penguin.co.uk/podcasts

The Penguin Podcast is a fortnightly podcast by Penguin Books.

Authors talk about objects that have special meanings.

Initially the host was Richard E. Grant. He stepped down in November 2016 and the series was re-launched with guest hosts conducting the interviews.

The podcasts are hosted in iTunes, Acast and SoundCloud.

The show won "Best Branded Podcast" at the 2020 British Podcast Awards.

== Episode list ==
Episode	Guest	Interviewer	Date
1	Kate Atkinson	Richard E. Grant	15 July 2015
2	Bridget Christie	Richard E. Grant	4 August 2015
3	Pat Barker	Richard E. Grant	25 August 2015
4	Meera Syal	Richard E. Grant	15 September 2015
5	Paula Hawkins	Richard E. Grant	6 October 2015
6	Bill Bryson	Richard E. Grant	27 October 2015
7	Elvis Costello	Richard E. Grant	17 November 2015
8	Neil Gaiman	Richard E. Grant	8 December 2015
9	Michael Acton Smith	Richard E. Grant	29 December 2015
10	Phil Redmond	Richard E. Grant	12 January 2016
11	Louis de Bernières	Richard E. Grant	2 February 2016
12	Howard Jacobson	Richard E. Grant	23 February 2016
13	Colm Tóibín	Richard E. Grant	29 February 2016
14	Shami Chakrabarti	Richard E. Grant	16 March 2016
15	Francesca Martinez	Richard E. Grant	6 April 2016
16	Alain de Botton	Richard E. Grant	27 April 2016
17	Chris Packham	Richard E. Grant	5 May 2016
18	Irvine Welsh	Richard E. Grant	25 May 2016
19	John Finnemore	Richard E. Grant	15 June 2016
20	Emma Kennedy	Richard E. Grant	6 July 2016
21	Shappi Khorsandi	Richard E. Grant	27 July 2016
22	Highlights 1		16 August 2016
23	Highlights 2		7 September 2016
24	Robert Harris	Richard E. Grant	28 September 2016
25	Clare Balding	Richard E. Grant	4 October 2016
26	The Football Ramble		19 October 2016
27	Alexandra Shulman	Richard E. Grant	2 November 2016
28	Johnny Marr	David Baddiel	16 November 2016
29	Zadie Smith	David Baddiel	30 November 2016
30	James Oswald	Konnie Huq	14 December 2016
31	Tom Fletcher	Konnie Huq	26 December 2016
32	Ali Land	Paul Smith	10 January 2017
33	Ruby Wax	David Baddiel	24 January 2017
34	Harriet Harman	Konnie Huq	8 February 2017
35	John Boyne	Paul Smith	22 February 2017
36	David Hepworth	Paul Smith	8 March 2017
37	Elan Mastai	David Baddiel	22 March 2017
38	Brad Stone	David Baddiel	5 April 2017
39	Jon Culshaw	Meera Syal	19 April 2017
40	Jo Nesbø	Konnie Huq	3 May 2017
41	Jane Corry	Paul Smith	31 May 2017
42	Carlo Rovelli	Konnie Huq	13 June 2017
43	Helen Fielding	Konnie Huq	28 June 2017
44	Simon Sebag Montefiore	Paul Smith	11 July 2017
45	Naomi Klein	David Baddiel	26 July 2017
46	Tim Weaver	Paul Smith	9 August 2017
47	Kathy Reichs	Konnie Huq	23 August 2017
48	Simon Sinek	Konnie Huq	30 August 2017
49	Anthony Horowitz	Konnie Huq	6 September 2017
50	Harlan Coben	Konnie Huq	20 September 2017
51	Rachel Botsman	Konnie Huq	4 October 2017
52	Malcolm Gladwell	Paul Smith	17 October 2017
53	Stephen Fry	David Baddiel	31 October 2017
54	No Such Thing as a Fish	Paul Smith	14 November 2017
55	Nina Stibbe	Konnie Huq	28 November 2017
56	Ian Rankin	David Baddiel	13 December 2017
57	Jeff Kinney	Konnie Huq	27 December 2017
