= The Change (TV series) =

2023 British television series

- Genre: Dark comedy Comedy-drama; Surreal humour
- Created by: Bridget Christie
- Written by: Bridget Christie
- Directed by: Al Campbell; Mackenzie Crook
- Starring: Bridget Christie; Monica Dolan; Susan Lynch; Jim Howick; Jerome Flynn; Paul Whitehouse; Liza Tarbuck; Omid Djalili
- Country of origin: United Kingdom
- Original language: English
- No. of series: 2
- No. of episodes: 12

Production
- Executive producers: Bridget Christie; Nerys Evans; Morwenna Gordon
- Producer: Lisa Mitchell
- Production company: Expectation Entertainment

Original release
- Network: Channel 4
- Release: 21 June 2023 – 11 March 2025

The Change is a British comedy drama series starring, written and created by Bridget Christie for Channel 4 and co-directed by Mackenzie Crook. Regular cast members include Susan Lynch, Jim Howick, Jerome Flynn, Paul Whitehouse, Liza Tarbuck and Omid Djalili. A second series was broadcast in March 2025.

The show's end credits music is Hares on the Mountain performed by Shirley Collins and Ian Kearey.

== Synopsis ==
Linda (Christie) has an existential crisis at the age of 50 after being informed she has started menopause. She finds her old Triumph motorcycle and goes on a pilgrimage around her old haunts in the Forest of Dean.

== Cast ==
- Bridget Christie as Linda
- Monica Dolan as Carmel (Season 1)
- Susan Lynch as Agnes
- Jim Howick as The Verderer
- Jerome Flynn as William (Pig Man)
- Paul Whitehouse as Tony
- Liza Tarbuck as Linda's sister Siobhain
- Tanya Moodie as Joy
- Omid Djalili as Linda's husband Steve
- Sonny Charlton as Ryan, a non-binary member of the community
- Laura Checkley as Theresa (Season 2)

== Episodes ==
=== Series 1 (2023) ===
No.	Title	Directed by	Written by	Original release date	U.K. viewers (millions)
1	"Episode 1"	Al Campbell	Bridget Christie	21 June 2023	N/A
After being told she is going through the menopause, Linda heads to the Forest of Dean to find a time capsule she hid in a tree, trying to reconnect with the person she used to be.
2	"Episode 2"	Al Campbell	Bridget Christie	21 June 2023	N/A
Trying to locate the time capsule, Linda runs into Pig Man, who maybe knows about her more than he lets on.
3	"Episode 3"	Al Campbell	Bridget Christie	28 June 2023	N/A
Linda interrupts the town meeting after stumbling upon crucial information.
4	"Episode 4"	Al Campbell	Bridget Christie	28 June 2023	N/A
Linda receives a visit from her sister Siobhain, who is very displeased with Linda's newfound community.
5	"Episode 5"	Al Campbell	Bridget Christie	5 July 2023	N/A
Ahead of the town festival, Linda bonds with the Eel sisters and Joy.
6	"Episode 6"	Al Campbell	Bridget Christie	5 July 2023	N/A
The transformed Eel Festival threatens to disrupt the delicate harmony in the village.

=== Series 2 (2025) ===
The second series was made available prior to linear broadcast on Channel 4 on-demand for subscribers to its paid Channel 4+ tier on 11 March 2025.

No.	Title	Directed by	Written by	Original release date	U.K. viewers (millions)
1	"malleus maleficarum"	Bridget Christie and Mackenzie Crook	Bridget Christie	11 March 2025	N/A
Linda finds herself on trial for lying to the town about her true identity
2	"mycelium"	Bridget Christie and Mackenzie Crook	Bridget Christie	11 March 2025	N/A
The seeds of a revolution are being sown, but Linda’s reluctant to lead the campaign
3	"the mental load"	Bridget Christie and Mackenzie Crook	Bridget Christie	11 March 2025	N/A
Linda begins to realise the power that her ledgers have unleashed in the town's women
4	"psilocybin"	Bridget Christie and Mackenzie Crook	Bridget Christie	11 March 2025	N/A
While the men and women are more divided than ever, Linda’s past comes back to haunt her
5	"the witch trials of england (C15-C18)"	Bridget Christie and Mackenzie Crook	Bridget Christie	11 March 2025	N/A
The Eel Sisters invite Linda to their annual Silent Supper, and The Verderer declares war
6	"truffle"	Bridget Christie and Mackenzie Crook	Bridget Christie	11 March 2025	N/A
The strike is over and there’s a sense of new beginnings for everyone…

== Production ==
In July 2022 the series started filming, and Howick, Djalili, Whitehouse, Tarbuck and Dolan joined the cast. Later, Susan Lynch was revealed to have joined the cast as an Eel sister. Filming took place on location in the Forest of Dean. Christie was brought up in near the Forest of Dean, and had in 2021 experienced some of the symptoms explored in the series.

A second series was confirmed in May 2024 with filming locations including Chepstow in July 2024.

== Broadcast ==
The series began airing on Channel 4 on 21 June 2023. The second series premiered on Channel 4 on 25 March 2025.

== Reception ==
=== Critical reception ===
The Evening Standard awarded the show four stars out of five, calling it "joyful" and observing that "[while] it is cutting both in its humour and its astute social commentary, it is also immensely warm, grounded in familial community and nostalgic in a way that is hard to define." The Guardian also gave four stars out of five, declaring it "like nothing else on TV" and identifying Christie's protagonist as "the role model we've all been waiting for.". Comedy website Chortle also gave it four stars, calling it 'sardonic yet surreal'

Hollie Richardson in The Guardian subsequently reviewed the final episode of the first series as "gorgeous", "life-affirming", and "the most profound finale of the year." Chitra Ramaswamy in The Guardian gave the second series five stars describing it as "ambitious, surreal, moving, and above all hysterically funny".

On review aggregator website Rotten Tomatoes, the first series has a 92% approval rating based on 12 critics' reviews, with an average rating of 8.0/10. The second series has 100% approval from 6 critics, with average rating 8.8/10.

== Accolades ==
In February 2024, the series was nominated at the Broadcast Awards in the Best Comedy Programme category. That month, it was also nominated in the Best TV Show category at the Chortle Awards. Christie was nominated for Best Writer - Comedy at the Royal Television Society Programme Awards. In March 2024, Christie was nominated in the Female performance in a comedy programme category at the 2024 British Academy Television Awards.

In August 2024, Christie won Best Actress - Comedy at the Edinburgh TV Awards at the Edinburgh International Television Festival.
