= Beat the Brain =

2015 British quiz show

- Genre: Quiz show
- Presented by: John Craven
- Voices of: Josie Lawrence (The Brain)
- Country of origin: United Kingdom
- Original language: English
- No. of series: 1
- No. of episodes: 30

Production
- Running time: 30 minutes
- Production companies: Over the Top Productions and Objective Productions

Original release
- Network: BBC Two
- Release: 11 May – 19 June 2015

Beat the Brain is a BBC quiz show that aired on BBC Two from 11 May 2015 to 19 June 2015. It was hosted by John Craven, while Josie Lawrence provided the voice of "The Brain," an image of a disembodied human brain that posed challenges to the contestants and lit up in a variety of neon colours.

== Gameplay ==
A team of four contestants plays each game, with one member designated as captain.

The Brain is divided into six zones, each corresponding to a different category: Logic, Memory, Orientation, Observation, Language, and Multi-Tasking. A zone is chosen at random, and the captain selects one team member to play two challenges related to it. Each challenge consists of a practice question, followed by three more questions; every correct answer on the latter adds three seconds to the team's "Brain Bank" for use in the final. The round ends once all four team members have played a pair of challenges; no zone is used more than once. Some challenges have an overall time limit. The team can accumulate up to 72 seconds in the Brain Bank by answering every question correctly.

In the final, the team attempts to win up to £3,000 cash by answering questions similar to those faced in the individual challenges, but in a random order. The captain decides the order in which the four team members will play. The clock is set to two minutes, plus the total time accumulated in the Brain Bank. Once the team member in control answers two questions correctly, their turn ends, and control passes to the next one in the order. If all four members complete their questions before the clock reaches two minutes, they win the entire jackpot; otherwise, the game continues and the prize begins to decrease by £25 per second. They win the remaining money for completing the round, or nothing at all if time runs out. Winnings are divided equally among all four members.

== Reception ==
Ian Wolf of On The Box described it as "perfectly enjoyable" but at the same time lamented the asininity of the questions being posed by The Brain, further berating its low prize fund of just £750 per person. He also commended the fact that "just about anyone can have a go. Whether you know all the prime ministers or the elements of the periodic table is irrelevant. It is all about mental ability, short-term memory, basic arithmetic, spelling, and so forth".

== Cancellation ==
On 19 June 2015, the BBC had decided not to renew the second series of the gameshow after just one series and 30 episodes.

== International versions ==
Legend: Currently airing Ended Future version

Country	Local title	Host(s)	Network	Premiere	Top Prize	The size of the prize (In British Pounds)
Russia	Человек против мозга Chelovek protiv mozga	Victor Vasilyev	Che	18 January 2016	60,000 р.	£533.92
