= Short Change =

1994-2005 British TV series

- Genre: Consumer affairs
- Presented by: Zoe Ball (1994-1995); Andi Peters (1996); Tim Vincent (1997-1999); Ortis Deley (1999-2005); Alex Leam (2000); Rhodri Owen (2000-2005); Angellica Bell (2001-2004); Thalia Pellegrini (2005)
- Country of origin: United Kingdom
- Original language: English
- No. of series: 13
- No. of episodes: 139

Original release
- Network: BBC One; CBBC
- Release: 20 February 1994 – 12 July 2005

Short Change is a UK consumer affairs programme for children, broadcast on BBC One and later on CBBC. It ran for 13 series from 1994 to 2005.

== Episode guide ==
Series	Episodes	Duration	Presenter(s)
1	6	20 February 1994 – 27 March 1994	Zoe Ball
2	6	19 February 1995 – 26 March 1995	Zoe Ball
3	7	18 February 1996 – 31 March 1996	Andi Peters
Series 3 compilation	1	5 January 1997	Andi Peters
4	8	9 February 1997 – 30 March 1997	Tim Vincent
Fan Clubs Special	1	9 November 1997	Tim Vincent
5	6	11 January 1998 – 15 February 1998	
6	12	7 January 1999 – 25 March 1999	Tim Vincent & Ortis Deley
7	12	6 January 2000 – 23 March 2000	Ortis Deley, Rhodri Owen & Alex Leam
8	12	4 January 2001 – 22 March 2001	Ortis Deley, Rhodri Owen & Angellica Bell
9	14	29 March 2001 – 28 June 2001	Ortis Deley, Rhodri Owen & Angellica Bell
10	13	18 April 2002 – 11 July 2002	Ortis Deley, Rhodri Owen & Angellica Bell
11	13	24 April 2003 – 17 July 2003	Ortis Deley, Rhodri Owen & Angellica Bell
12	15	8 April 2004 – 15 July 2004	Ortis Deley, Rhodri Owen & Angellica Bell
Fat Nation Challenge – The Big Challenge	18	9 September 2004 – 7 November 2004	Matt Allwright
13	15	5 April 2005 – 12 July 2005	Ortis Deley, Rhodri Owen & Thalia Pellegrini

== PriceBusters competition ==
On each programme, viewers were challenged to find the cheapest and most expensive prices for a given product throughout the country: two winners each week (one finding each extreme price) would win a boom-box stereo. Bill Bennett won the competition two weeks running, by finding the most expensive prices for the given products, and including Tesco's grocery delivery charge of £5. This made the cost of a Müller Rice around £5.40, much more expensive than prices found by any other entrant. Following the two consecutive wins, the rules were changed to omit delivery charges from the total cost for a particular product.

== See also ==
- Street Cents, a CBC programme influenced by Short Change
- Watchdog (TV programme)
