= Dumpton School =

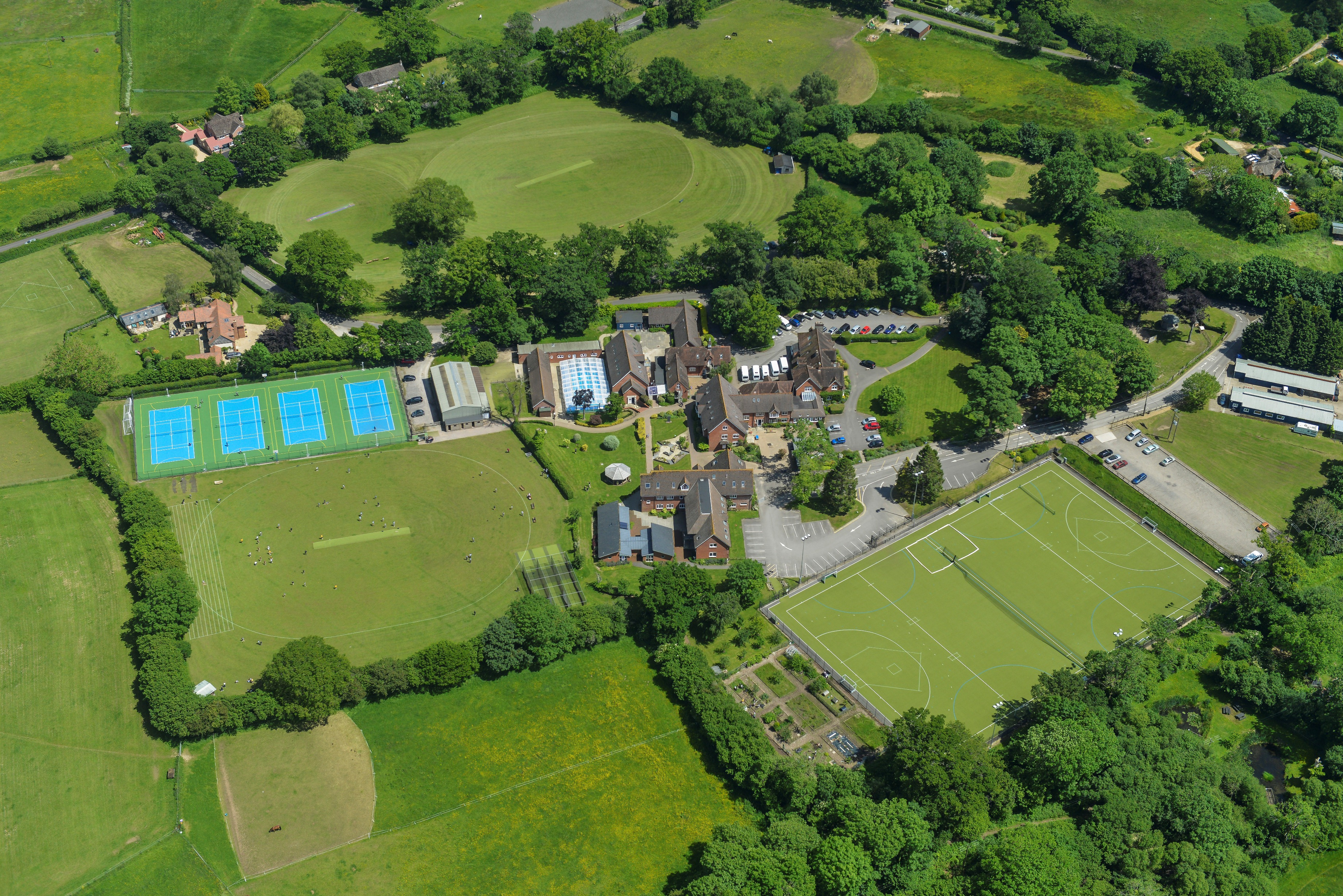
- Aerial view of the 26-acre site of Dumpton School

Location
- Deans Grove House; Wimborne, Dorset, BH21 7AF; England; 50.8131°N 1.97537°W

Information
- Type: Independent Prep School
- Motto: Possunt Quia Posse Videntur (Latin) (You can because you think you can)
- Religious affiliation: Christian
- Established: 1903
- Local authority: Dorset
- Department for Education URN: 113923 Tables
- Head teacher: Christian Saenger
- Gender: Mixed-Coeducational
- Age: 2 to 13
- Website: www.dumpton.com

Dumpton School is an independent day school in Wimborne, Dorset, South West England, for girls and boys aged 2 to 13 years.

== History ==
The school was founded as a boys' preparatory school at Dumpton Park in Kent in 1903 and evacuated to Cranborne Chase in Dorset to avoid bombing raids at the outset of the Second World War, (as were many schools from south-east England).

In 1945, the school moved to Gaunt's House, near Wimborne, and flourished under the Headmastership of Colonel Trevor Card. Unusually, the dormitories were named in memory of former pupils who had died on active service; (these included Cock, Pollard, Brown, York, Dutton and Fanshawe). Trevor Card was succeeded by Messrs Carter and Monkhouse as joint heads in 1958 and subsequently by Major General Frank Thompson.

In 1988 the school moved again to its present site at Dean's Grove House nearer to Wimborne.

== Notable Old Dumptonians ==
- Sidney Boucher, (1899–1963) Royal Naval officer and first-class cricketer
- Admiral Jeremy de Halpert
- Duncan James (born 1978), pop singer (Blue)
- Ore Oduba (born 1986), children's TV presenter (CBBC), 2016 winner of Strictly Come Dancing
