= Matthew Price =

British journalist (born 1972)

- Born: Matthew William Price; 5 June 1972 (age 54); Hampstead, London, England, UK
- Occupation: journalist
- Years active: 1994–present

Matthew William Price (born 5 June 1972 in Hampstead, London) is a British journalist who currently works as Chief Correspondent for the BBC Radio 4 Today programme.

== Education ==
Matthew Price was educated at The Haberdashers' Aske's Boys' School, a day independent school in Elstree in Hertfordshire, followed by St Catharine's College at the University of Cambridge, gaining a First Class degree in Geography.

== Life and career ==
He began his career in 1994 as a trainee local radio reporter. He worked at BBC Radio Lincolnshire and then for the BBC in Newcastle. In 1999 he moved on to report for the BBC's news programme for children, Newsround. In 2000 he was voted the Royal Television Society's Young Journalist of the Year. Following his work for Newsround he went on to work in a number of posts as a BBC television reporter, including Belgrade correspondent, and covering the Iraq War from an aircraft carrier in the Persian Gulf and from Baghdad. Prior to moving to New York, he was stationed in Jerusalem as a Middle East correspondent.

He then lived and worked in Brussels as the BBC's Europe Correspondent often reporting for the BBC News Channel, BBC World News and the flagship BBC One News bulletins, the BBC News at Six and the BBC News at Ten.

In 2010 Price's work with Producer Ian Sherwood and cameraman Chuck Tayman covering Mexico's Drugs Wars was nominated for an Emmy Award. In January 2011 their work as a team was recognised with a dupont-Columbia School of Journalism Award for coverage of the 2010 Haiti earthquake. The coverage of the Haiti earthquake also earned Price, producer Ian Sherwood and cameraman Chuck Tayman and Emmy Nomination in 2011. Price was named News Journalist of the Year at the Sony Radio Awards in 2011 in large part due to his work covering the earthquake in Haiti.

Price is now Chief Correspondent for the BBC Radio 4 Today programme and presents the Beyond Today podcast on BBC Sounds.
