= Lizo Mzimba =

English journalist

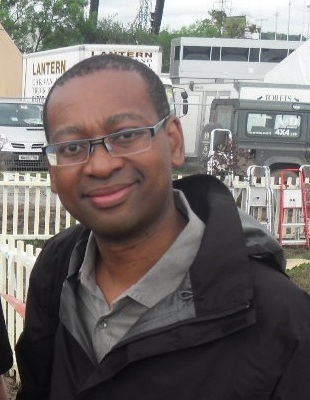
- Mzimba in 2011
- Born: Lizo Mzimba; Solihull, England
- Education: Solihull School, University of Birmingham
- Occupations: Journalist, television presenter
- Notable credit(s): Newsround; BBC News

Lizo Mzimba is an English journalist and television presenter. He was a presenter, reporter, and assistant producer on CBBC's Newsround from 1998 to 2008, becoming one of the programme's longest-serving presenters. In 2008, he became the Entertainment Correspondent for BBC News, reporting for BBC News bulletins and programmes including BBC Breakfast.

== Early life ==
Mzimba attended the independent Solihull School (during which time he was also leader of the Birmingham Schools' Symphony Orchestra) and the University of Birmingham. Whilst at Birmingham he was a member of the student TV station, winning awards at NaSTA (National Student Television Association). By 1991, he was contributing to Sounds magazine.

== Career ==
Mzimba was one of the longest-serving presenters, a reporter and an assistant producer for CBBC's Newsround between 1998 and 2008.

In 2003, Mzimba hosted a televised interview with J. K. Rowling and Steve Kloves about the 2002 film Harry Potter and the Chamber of Secrets.

In 2008, Mzimba became the BBC News Entertainment Correspondent. Along with the traditional BBC News bulletins and the News Channel, he has also appeared on BBC Breakfast. Mzimba has also appeared as himself on The Sarah Jane Adventures. In 2023, during Jai Paul's first-ever live performance, at Coachella, Mzimba's image was used as a part of the visuals of the set.
