= Brinley Thomas =

Welsh economist

Brinley Thomas, CBE, FBA (6 January 1906 – 31 August 1994) was a Welsh economist. He was Professor of Economics and Social Sciences at University College, Cardiff, from 1946 to 1973.

== Early life and education ==
Thomas was born on 6 January 1906 in Pontrhydyfen, where his father was the deputy manager of a mine. He secured scholarships to Port Talbot Grammar School and the University College of Wales at Aberystwyth, graduating from the latter in 1926 with a first-class degree in economics. In 1928, he completed a master's degree there. In the meantime, he was forced to take teaching work in Pembrokeshire to support his family financially. He was awarded a fellowship by the University of Wales and completed a PhD at the London School of Economics (LSE) in 1931.

== Career ==
Thomas was appointed to a lectureship at the LSE the year he received his PhD. He received a travelling scholarship (1932–34) allowing him to study in Germany and Sweden, where he was introduced to the Swedish School of economic thought; on his return, Thomas introduced Knut Wicksell and Gustav Cassel's work to Anglophone audiences. His book, Monetary Policy and Crises: A Study of Swedish Experience was published in 1936. He left LSE in 1939 and served in the Foreign Office during the Second World War.

After hostilities ended, Thomas taught at the LSE for a brief period before he was appointed the Professor of Economics and Social Sciences at University College, Cardiff, in 1946. There, he turned his attention to migration. He wrote Migration and Economic Growth: A Study of Great Britain and the Atlantic Economy (1954). He was appointed an Officer of the Order of the British Empire the next year (OBE). In 1972, he wrote Migration and Urban Development: A Reappraisal of British and American Long Cycles. He retired from his chair in 1973, the same year he was promoted to CBE and elected a fellow of the British Academy. He had also served as chairman of the Welsh Council from 1968 to 1971. His final book was The Industrial Revolution and the Atlantic Economy: Selected Essays (1993). He died on 31 August 1994; he was survived by his wife Cynthia and their daughter.
