= Newsround =

BBC TV children's news programme (since 1972)

- Also known as: John Craven's Newsround
- Created by: Edward Barnes; John Craven
- Presented by: Nina Blissett; Ricky Boleto; Jenny Lawrence; De'Graft Mensah; Shanequa Paris
- Country of origin: United Kingdom
- Original language: English

Production
- Production locations: BBC Television Centre (1972–2011); dock10 studios (2011–present)
- Editor: Lewis James
- Running time: 5–15 minutes
- Production companies: BBC Studios Kids & Family

Original release
- Network: BBC One (1972–2012); CBBC (2002–present); BBC Two (2022–present)
- Release: 4 April 1972 – present

Related
- Sportsround; Ffeil

Newsround (stylised as newsround) is a BBC children's news programme which has run continuously since 4 April 1972. Originally John Craven's Newsround, it was one of the world's first television news magazines aimed specifically at children. Initially commissioned as a short series by BBC Children's Department, who held editorial control, its facilities were provided by BBC News. Broadcast on CBBC, the programme is aimed at 5- to 15-year-olds.

== History ==
Created by Edward Barnes and John Craven and originally titled John Craven's Newsround, it was first presented by Craven from 4 April 1972 to 22 June 1989. Originally, stand-in presenters, such as Richard Whitmore, came from the main BBC News bulletins.

In 1987, the show was renamed Newsround, and was presented by a rotating team including Craven in the dual role of chief presenter and programme editor. The programme gradually developed its own small reporting team, including Helen Rollason, Lucy Mathen, and long-serving space editor Reg Turnill. Other presenters included Juliet Morris, Krishnan Guru-Murthy, Julie Etchingham, Chris Rogers, Kate Gerbeau, Matthew Price and Becky Jago. Regular reporters on the programme, who have also presented it, included Paul Welsh, Lizo Mzimba and Terry Baddoo. Also, for most of its first two decades, Newsround drew upon the BBC's network of national and international correspondents such as John Humphrys, Michael Buerk and Martin Bell.

Newsround was the first British television programme to break the news of the loss of the Space Shuttle Challenger on 28 January 1986. This edition was presented by Roger Finn, who had only recently joined the programme. The programme was also first in Britain to report an assassination attempt on Pope John Paul II in Vatican City in 1981 and provided the first reports from the Windsor Castle fire of November 1992.

In February 2002, Newsround expanded from a sole ten-minute programme on weeknights to through-the-day bulletins seven days a week to tie-in with the launch of the CBBC Channel, and was broadcast across BBC One, BBC Two and the CBBC Channel. With this included a new theme, titles and expanded presenting team. The online and schools' offering were also expanded. In the early 00s Newsround was the most watched programme for children in the UK, and also had the highest AI score (a measure of programme engagement and appreciation) of all CBBC programmes. Following the 9/11 attacks, Newsround launched a guide to help children who were worried by news events. As part of the relocation of the BBC Children's Department, Newsround began broadcasting from new studios at Dock10, MediaCityUK in Salford Quays on Monday 21 November 2011.

Logo from 2019 to 2023

In July 2020, the 16:20 & 08:15 programmes were axed after being on air since 1972. BBC executives concluded that children no longer turn on traditional television channels when they return home from school, and that the focus would shift to Newsround's morning edition often used by teachers in school classrooms, and to more investment in the programme's website. The 7:40am bulletin was moved to 7:45am, and would be eight minutes long. However, in the event of serious breaking news such as a Royal Family member's death, some special editions would air at other points in the day.

Newsround moved out of studio HQ5 for undisclosed reasons on 17 December 2023. All production from HQ5 had ceased by 22 December, and the studio had been emptied by 25 January. Newsround shared space with a temporary set in the CBeebies studio until a permanent one was constructed in the future. On 17 March 2025, Newsround moved into their new permanent studio, with Jenny Lawrence being the first person to present from the new studio.

== Broadcasting times ==
Every day, Newsround is broadcast on CBBC once a day, with an eight-minute bulletin on weekdays and a six-minute bulletin on weekends at around 7:45am. On Saturday morning, it is also broadcast on BBC Two. Like many BBC News TV bulletins, it is available for 24 hours on BBC iPlayer and the Newsround section of the CBBC website.

Newsround has a break at Christmas time for 2 weeks, in line with the Christmas school holidays in the UK.

== Presenters and reporters ==
Newsround has starred a large number of presenters, many of which went on to become further involved around children's television. On occasion, the stand-in presenter (which is Otis Holmes) will appear if required when the then scheduled presenter is cancelled for that bulletin.

The programme also draws on the BBC's global network of correspondents and its sister programme What's New produced by the BBC World Service.

=== Current presenters ===
- Jenny Lawrence (2013–present)
- De'Graft Mensah (2019–present)
- Shanequa Paris (2020–present)
- Nina Blissett (2021–present)
- Otis Holmes (2023–present) ( Previously stand in)

=== Former presenters ===
Year	Presenter	Tenure
1976–1980	Lucy Mathen (and Reporter)	4 years
1979–1985	Paul McDowell (and Reporter)	6 years
1972–1989	John Craven (and Editor)	17 years
1987–1990	Helen Rollason	3 years
1985–1991	Roger Finn	6 years
1991–1992	Paul Welsh (and Reporter)	1 year
1990–1994	Juliet Morris	4 years
1991–1994	Krishnan Guru-Murthy	3 years
1994–1998	Julie Etchingham	4 years
1994–1999	Chris Rogers	5 years
1997–2001	Kate Gerbeau	4 years
1999–2002	Matthew Price (and Reporter)	3 years
May 2002 – October 2002	Adam Smyth (and Reporter)	5 months
2001–2003	Becky Jago	2 years
2002–2006	Rachel Horne	4 years
2003–2007	Thalia Pellegrini	4 years
1998–2008	Lizo Mzimba	10 years
2001–2008	Lizzie Greenwood-Hughes	7 years
2002–2008	Laura Jones	6 years
2003–2008	Ellie Crisell	5 years
2005–2008	Jake Humphrey	3 years
2007–2008	Helen Skelton	1 year
2002–2009	Adam Fleming	7 years
2007–2009	Gavin Ramjaun	2 years
2008–2009	Maddy Savage	1 year
2006–2011	Sonali Shah	5 years
2008–2013	Ore Oduba	5 years
2009–2013	Joe Tidy	4 years
2010–2014	Nel Hedayat	4 years
2013–2018	Ayshah Tull	5 years
2015–2020	Nazia Mogra (Stand-in presenter)	5 years
2009–2021	Leah Boleto	12 years
2013–2022	Martin Dougan (Stand-in presenter)	9 years
2009–2023	Hayley Hassall	14 years
2024–2026	Emma-Louise Amanshia	2 years

== Editors ==
- Edward Barnes (1972)
- Jill Roach (1976)
- John Craven (1986–1989)
- Eric Rowan
- Nick Heathcote (1990–1996)
- Susie Staples (1996–1998)
- Ian Prince (editor twice).
- Roy Milani
- Sinead Rocks
- Owenna Griffiths (2009–)
- Daniel Clark (−2013)
- Lewis James (2013–present)
- Paul Plunkett (2019; parental leave cover for Lewis James)

== Spin-offs ==
=== Newsround Specials ===
A variation on the regular format of Newsround is a series of short (typically 15-minute) documentary films, previously broadcast under the title Newsround Extra but now called "specials", which have been a regular feature since the late 1970s. Two or three series of these documentaries air during the year, which replace the regular bulletins on one day of the week (for Extras it was usually Monday, although sometimes on Fridays, particularly during the 1980s).

Newsround Specials in recent years have included:

- The Wrong Trainers: a series of six animated films dealing with child poverty. The programme won the 2006 Royal award for best children's programme and the 2007 BAFTA children's award for best factual programme.
- The Worst Thing Ever: a dramatised documentary revolving around a child's experience of their parents' divorce.
- Newsround on Knives: an animated look at knife crime from a child's point of view. (Bafta nominated)
- Gone: interviews with four bereaved children. (Bafta nominated)
- Whose Side Are You On?: a drama on the role of bystanders in tackling bullying, featuring Joe Calzaghe, Aston Merrygold, Patsy Palmer, George Sampson and Gemma Hunt (first shown 16 November 2009)
- Living with Alcohol: a special about children's experiences with alcohol, presented by Barney Harwood.
- "Ricky Investigates": a six-part investigative series which began on 28 September 2010
- A one-off Newsround Investigates documentary on arson in schools was broadcast in May 2006.

The most recent Newsround Specials:

Title	About	Presenter	Date
Caught in the Web	A modern-day fairytale exploring the dangers of the internet, combining drama with cautionary real-life tales (BAFTA nominated).	Narrated by David Tennant	9 February 2010
Growing Up in a War Zone	A special about how the lives of children in Afghanistan are affected by the war, presented by Sonali Shah.	Sonali Shah	22 November 2010
Life on the Front Line	A special about why British troops are in Afghanistan and what we are doing, presented by Ore Oduba.	Ore Oduba	28 February 2011
The Real Tracy Beaker	Dani Harmer, who plays Tracy Beaker in the hit CBBC series, presents a Newsround special where she finds out what it's really like to grow up in care.	Dani Harmer	March 2011
Living with Cancer	CBBC actress Dominique Moore takes a personal look at how cancer affects the lives of children and young people.	Dominique Moore	June 2011
Children of the Drought	A special about the impact of the drought to Kenyan children, presented by Ricky Boleto	Ricky Boleto	28 July 2011
Behind the Riots	A special about the riots, what's been going on and why, presented by Sonali Shah	Sonali Shah	12 August 2011
My Autism and Me	A special about what it is like to have autism with 13-year-old Rosie King.	Rosie King	11 November 2011
Welcome to My World	Children from different cultures spend a week in each other's lives, narrated by Leah Boleto	Narrated by Leah Boleto	11 November 2011
Behind Closed Doors	A special about children's experience with domestic violence, presented by Barney Harwood featuring Alesha Dixon	Barney Harwood	19 March 2012
Football and Race	A special about if racism still exists in football, presented by Ore Oduba	Ore Oduba	17 August 2012
Up And Away	14-year-old Rosie King, who has autism, hears the moving, often inspirational stories of kids who, like her, have made the great leap to big school.	Rosie King	7 September 2012
Decision Time USA	Ricky travels to the States to meet people from all walks of life to talk about the election, what they think about the candidates, and how they will vote...	Ricky Boleto	6 November 2012
My Dyslexic Mind	A special about dyslexia, explaining it and what it's like to be a child with it, presented by 12-year-old Ben	Ben Hunter	7 January 2013
Hard Times	A special about children who are finding it tough in the current economic crisis, presented by Ricky Boleto.	Ricky Boleto	March 2013
Generation Inspiration?	A year on from the London 2012 Olympic and Paralympic games, this film explores how far they've got in terms of inspiring a generation of kids to get involved in sport.	Barney Harwood/Martin Dougan	25 July 2013
Surviving The Typhoon	A special about how children coped after one of the most powerful storms ever hit the Philippines, Typhoon Haiyan, presented by Leah Boleto.	Leah Boleto	23 December 2013
Cyberbullying	Reporter Ricky Boleto investigates the world of cyberbullying, speaking to young victims and finding out about their experiences.	Ricky Boleto	11 February 2014
Children of Kabul – An Uncertain Future	Nel Hedayat goes to Afghanistan, the country of her birth, where she meets the child casualties of the war and sees the influence of Western culture.	Nel Hedayat	25 March 2014
Frontline Families	Newsround meets British families who have been changed by war and hears from children who have dealt with years of separation, disabilities and bereavement.	Martin Dougan	26 March 2014
How To Make Friends on Planet Earth	Looking at how children make friends, through the story of a lonely alien who disguises herself as a regular schoolgirl and visits Earth		20 November 2014
America vs Food	A documentary on the issue of obesity and overeating in America, presented by Ricky Boleto	Ricky Boleto	2015
Being Me	A special that explores what UK children think of their body image, featuring popstar Meghan Trainor	Milly Innes	31 March 2015
Growing Up Black in America	A special on life for black people in America after the rise of the Black Lives Matter movement and the events surrounding it.	Ricky Boleto	2 June 2015
Hiroshima: A Newsround Special	A documentary commemorating the 70th anniversary of the bombings of Hiroshima and Nagasaki, talking to a survivor and the youth of Japan about what it means to them.	Leah Boleto	6 August 2015
Bullying – The Newsround Debate	Ricky and Leah talk to children about their experiences of bullying in front of an audience of 100 children. They ask questions about how the problem should be tackled.	Ricky and Leah Boleto	19 November 2015
Brothers and Sisters	Newsround looks at what it takes to be a brother or sister, by meeting children from all over the world and hearing some incredible stories.		17 February 2016
Is Tech Taking Over?	Ricky investigates how important technology is to children, taking some away from a group and then giving another group as much as they want.	Ricky Boleto	22 March 2016
Defending the Rhino	Ayshah looks at the fight that rhino are facing in South Africa.	Ayshah Tull	11 May 2016
Inside My Head: Taking Control of My Anxiety	A boy called Josh has a mental health problem, and originally didn't speak to anyone which made life difficult for him.		27 March 2017
Finding My Family – Partition	Ricky follows the adventure of three girls to India to find out what happened to their families during Indian Partition 70 years ago.	Ricky Boleto	8 August 2017
Finding My Family – Windrush	Maya and Levi head back to the Caribbean islands that their granddads left to see where they grew up and why they decided to start new lives in the UK.	Narrated by Baroness Floella Benjamin, OBE	18 June 2018
Finding My Family – Holocaust	Holocaust survivor Steven Frank takes his teenage granddaughter Maggie on a journey to learn about his experiences during the Holocaust. (BAFTA winner)	Narrated by Anthony Horowitz	27 January 2019
Anne Frank: A Life in Hiding	Nazia explores the story of Anne Frank – a young, Jewish teenager forced to go into hiding with her family during the Holocaust.	Nazia Morga	27 January 2019
"Living with the Wall"	Hayley finds out what life is like living by the US-Mexico border wall.	Hayley Hassall	23 May 2019
"Inside My Head: Taking Control of My Anxiety"	16-year-old Molly sets out on a mission to learn about what she can do to keep her anxiety in check.		6 February 2020
"Thirteen"	Newsround special spending a day in the life of six teenagers who each lead very different lives, to try and find out what life is really like at 13.	Narrated by Karim Zeroual	17 March 2020
"Australia – Life after the fires"	Australia experienced the worst bushfire season ever in 2019–2020 with fires blazing for months in large parts of the country	Maeve O'Sullivan	27 April 2020
"Summer Term in Lockdown"	After months in lockdown during the coronavirus pandemic, NR speaks to children about the past term at home		13 July 2020
"Fiji – On The Climate Change Front Line"	Martin travels to Fiji to witness first-hand the rising sea levels caused by global warming, and talks with the people living there about how climate change is impacting their lives.	Martin Dougan	14 September 2020
"Young, Black and British – Hear Us"	A two-part special; three young black teenagers speak out about what life is really like growing up black in the UK.	Narrated by Tashaneish Kacheri Robinson	22-23 October 2020
"Let's Talk About Periods"	Lauren meets experts, celebrities and children to find out what periods are, people's attitudes towards them and why it's important to open up the conversation.	Lauren Layfield	8 March 2021
"Coronavirus and UK Children"	One year since the UK first went into lockdown because of coronavirus, a Newsround survey finds out how children across the UK are feeling about life in 2021.	Narrated by Shanequa Paris	22 March 2021
"Let's Talk About Sexism"	Lauren meets experts, celebrities and children to find out what people think about sexism.	Lauren Layfield	4 April 2022

=== Newsround Showbiz ===
A light-hearted entertainment news round-up, originally known as Newsround Lite and introduced as part of the CBBC Channel's launch in February 2002. The latter version of the show was hosted by regular Newsround presenters/reporters Lizzie Greenwood-Hughes, Adam Fleming, Rachel Horne and Thalia Pellegrini, and produced by Sinéad Rocks. The programme was axed in 2005.

=== Sportsround ===
A Saturday morning sports magazine show introduced in September 2005 and produced by Sinead Rocks. It was cancelled in December 2010 and replaced by Match of the Day Kickabout, which was cancelled in 2021. In 2010 it was presented by Ore Oduba with reporters Des Clarke and Jon Franks.

=== Newsround Review of the Year ===
Until 2006, a half-hour review of the year special was produced for broadcast during the Christmas/New Year period. The last review aired in 2009, and from 2010 – 2019 the final bulletin of the year was hosted by all presenters.

Since at least the past few years, Newsround has had a break from broadcasting at Christmas time for two weeks during the school Christmas holidays.
