= Sportsround =

Television series

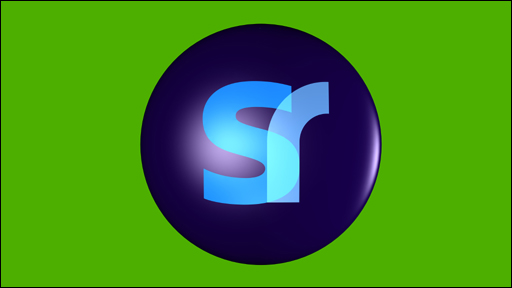
- Logo used from 2006-2010
- Presented by: Ade Adepitan (2005–06); Adam Fleming (2005–07); Jake Humphrey (2005–08); Lizzie Greenwood (2005–08); Helen Skelton (2007); Aidan Power (2008); Gavin Ramjaun (2008–09); Michael Absalom (2008–09); Sonali Shah (2008–09); Des Clarke (2008–10); Ore Oduba (2008–10); Jon Franks (2009–10)
- Country of origin: United Kingdom
- Original language: English

Production
- Producers: Sinead Rocks – Launch Producer & Editor
- Running time: 15 minutes

Original release
- Network: BBC One (2005); BBC Two; CBBC (2008–10)
- Release: 10 September 2005 – 11 December 2010

Related
- Newsround; Newsround Specials; Newsround Showbiz; Match of the Day Kickabout

Sportsround is a spin-off from CBBC children's news programme Newsround. The sports magazine show was broadcast weekly, between 2005 and 2010, on Friday evenings at 6:30pm on CBBC Channel and on Saturday mornings on BBC Two at 7.25am. It was first shown on BBC One on 10th September 2005 at 11.45am.

Sportsround was the only sports television show in the UK that was specifically aimed at children.

First broadcast in 2005, Sportsround was a well-known children's programme, regularly having big names on the show, including David Beckham, Lewis Hamilton, Jenson Button and Frank Lampard.

The final episode aired on 11 December 2010. It was replaced by a new sports show Match of the Day Kickabout, which airs in Sportsround's original BBC Two slot on Saturday mornings.

== Presenters ==
Presenter	Tenure
Ade Adepitan	2005–2006
Adam Fleming	2005–2007
Jake Humphrey	2005–2008
Lizzie Greenwood	2005–2008
Helen Skelton	2007
Aidan Power	2008
Gavin Ramjaun	2008–2009
Michael Absalom	2008–2009
Sonali Shah	2008–2009
Des Clarke	2008–2010
Ore Oduba	2008–2010
Jon Franks	2009–2010

== History ==
- In September 2005, Newsround set up a new spin-off show and launched Sportsround.
- On Saturday 19 May 2007, it was the first to broadcast a full television programme live from inside Wembley stadium, a few hours before the first FA Cup Final.
- In August 2007, it relaunched with new titles and a new set. This included a new sofa with the presenter sitting down rather than standing up.
- In October 2008, it relaunched again, this time the presenter would be out at an event and would be pre-recorded later that day. It featured a new team with new features.
- On Saturday 11 December 2010, Sportsround broadcasts its final show on the CBBC Channel with Ore Oduba and reporters Jon Franks and Des Clarke.

== Format ==
The duration of the programme was fifteen minutes.

Originally, Sportsround aired on BBC Two on Saturday mornings at 11:45am. It continued to air on this time and day for over three years. In October 2008, when it relaunched, it moved to a new slot and channel. It aired on Fridays at 6:10pm on the CBBC Channel and for the first time was repeated on Saturday mornings at 7:25am on BBC Two.

== Interviews ==
Sportsround interviewed many British and world sports stars, including Lewis Hamilton, David Beckham, José Mourinho, Wayne Rooney, Rafael Nadal, Michael Jordan, Steven Gerrard, Dame Kelly Holmes, Martina Hingis, Anna Kournikova, Ian Poulter and Armand Traoré.

== Features ==
- The Rivals- Two fans from two rival sports clubs going head to head in a challenge.
- Chad Von Cheeseburger- An American sports news reader (Ore) showing sporting clips from the internet.
- Des' Sporting Connections- Des connecting various sporting stars.
- Half Time- Halfway through the show, a look ahead to the weekend's sporting action.
- Skills Academy- Sporting skills shown off by the professionals.
- The Insider- Jon helping children work for their favourite club
- TXT Test- A sporting star trying to text 'I love Sportsround' as quickly as possible.
- Weekly Reports- A weekly report on one particular sport.
- Challenge the Presenters- A test of Ore's, Gavin's, Jon's or Sonali's abilities with different sports.
- 3 to See – A look at the top three sporting events to watch this weekend.
- 60 Seconds – A one-minute guide on any subject.
- Boys v Girls- A challenge to see if girls or boys were better at Sport.
- Challenge Gavin- A weekly test of Gavin's sporting abilities in various sports.
- Challenge Helen- A weekly test of Helen's sporting abilities in various sports.
- Gav-lympics- Gavin undertaking 48 Olympic sports in three days.
- Your Sport- Jake or Lizzie investigating a particular sport.
