= Barnjournalen =

- Country of origin: Sweden
- Original language: Swedish

Original release
- Network: SVT
- Release: 1972 – 23 March 1991

Barnjournalen is a children's news show which was broadcast between 3 August 1972 and 1991 on SVT.
