= Mixed hockey =

Field hockey game type

Mixed hockey is collective name for the sport of field hockey that comprises both men and women on one team. A team will contain eleven players: five will be male, five are female and the goalkeeper can be either sex. Mixed hockey is not associated with ice hockey or street hockey and is played on astroturf or grass.

Many countries have extensive club competitions for junior and senior players. Despite the large number of participants—hockey is thought to be the field team sport with the second-largest number of participants worldwide (the first being football)—club hockey is not a large spectator sport and few players play as full-time professionals. Hockey is a sport played internationally by both males and females, however in some countries, such as the United States, it is predominantly played by females. The England Hockey Board (EHB) is the National Governing Body for hockey in England.

== Terminology ==
Player
One of the participants in a team.
Team
A team consists of a maximum of 16 persons composed of a maximum of 11 players on the field and up to five substitutes.
Field player
One of the participants on the field other than the goalkeeper.
Goalkeeper
One of the participants of each team on the field who wears full protective equipment comprising at least headgear, leg guards and kickers and who is also permitted to wear goalkeeping hand protectors and other protective equipment.
Attack (Attacker)
The team (player) which (who) is trying to score a goal.
Defence (Defender)
The team (player) which (who) is trying to prevent a goal being scored.
Back-line
The shorter (55 metres) perimeter line.
Goal-line
The back-line between the goal-posts.
Side-line
The longer (91.40 metres) perimeter line.
Circle
The area enclosed by and including the two quarter circles and the lines joining them at each end of the field opposite the centre of the back-lines.
23 metres area
The area enclosed by and including the line across the field 22.90 metres from each back-line, the relevant part of the side-lines, and the back-line.
Hit
Striking the ball using a swinging movement of the stick towards the ball.
Push
Moving the ball along the ground using a pushing movement of the stick after the stick has been placed close to the ball. When a push is made, both the ball and the head of the stick are in contact with the ground.
Flick
Pushing the ball so that it is raised off the ground.
Drag Flick
Pushing the ball so that it is raised off to ground when attacking a penalty corner.
Scoop
Raising the ball off the ground by placing the head of the stick under the ball and using a lifting movement.
Tackle
An action to stop an opponent retaining possession of the ball.

=== Kit ===
- All players must wear shin pads and gum shields.
- Male players wear shorts and female players often wear skorts
- Hockey sticks range from 28" to 38.5".

=== Field of play ===
The information below provides a simplified description of the field of play.

The field of play is rectangular, 91.40 metres long and 55.00 metres wide.

Side-lines mark the longer perimeters of the field; backlines mark the shorter perimeters of the field.

The goal-lines are the parts of the back-lines between the goal-posts.

A centre-line is marked across the middle of the field.

Lines known as 23 metres lines are marked across the field 22.90 metres from each back-line.

Areas referred to as the circles are marked inside the field around the goals and opposite the centres of the backlines.

Penalty spots 150 mm in diameter are marked in front of the centre of each goal with the centre of each spot 6.40 metres from the inner edge of the goal-line.

All lines are 75 mm wide and are part of the field of play.

Flag-posts between 1.20 and 1.50 metres in height are placed at each corner of the field.

Goals are positioned outside the field of play at the centre of and touching each back-line.

== Specific rules for mixed hockey ==
When taking a short corner a female player must strike the first shot.

A female player must take a penalty flick.

If at any point there are more than 5 outfield players of one gender the umpire can abandon the game and reward a 5-0 victory for the team not breaching the rules.
