= Thalia Pellegrini =

British writer (born 1975)

Thalia Pellegrine
- Born: 16 August 1975 (age 51); London, England
- Occupation: Television presenter

Thalia Pellegrini (born 16 August 1975, in London) is a British television presenter and registered Nutritional Therapist (FdSc DipION BANT CNHC).

She graduated from the University of Cambridge with a degree in English. Between the years of 2003-2010, she presented programmes including CBBC's Newsround, Short Change, Fast Track and has reported for the BBC's Holiday programme. She appeared in half the episodes in the last season of Your News. In 2005 she accepted a place at the renowned Institute of Optimum Nutrition in London. Having transformed her own health by working with a nutritionist in her 20s, she wanted to do the same for other women. She graduated in 2009 as a nutritional therapist.

Thalia is a member of BANT (the British Association of Nutrition and Lifestyle Medicine). They are the professional body for Registered Nutrition Practitioners. She is also a member of the CNCH (the Complementary and Natural Healthcare Council) which is accredited by the Professional Standards Authority, the regulatory body that assures standards of practice in all areas of healthcare. Known as the Knackered Mums Nutritionist, she specialises in women's health with a special interest in maternal health. She works with women in their 30s and 40s to overcome hormonal imbalances, PMS, PCOS, weight loss, and supports exhausted mums through the perimenopause and menopause.

She continues to do both broadcast and corporate work. She was the featured nutritional therapist on two series of Channel 5's Secrets of Your Supermarket Foods in 2019 and 2020.
