= David Henry Smith =

- Born: 1954 (age 71–72); West Bromwich
- Occupation: Economics author
- Employer: The Sunday Times

David Henry Smith (born 1954) is a British economics author. He is known for his book The Dragon and the Elephant and for being the economics editor of The Sunday Times weekly newspaper.

== Biography ==
Smith was born in the West Midlands, and grew up in West Bromwich.

In 1989, Smith became the economics editor of The Sunday Times weekly newspaper.

In 2007, Smith was one of five shortlisted journalists in the finance/business category at the British Press Awards. A year later at the same awards, he was awarded the Highly Commended Feature Writer of the Year.

== Writings ==
- The Rise and Fall of Monetarism - 1991
- From Boom to Bust - Trial and Error in UK Economic Policy - 1992
- North and South - Britain's Economic Divide - 1994
- Will Europe Work - 1999
- The Dragon and The Elephant - 2007
- Free Lunch - Easily Digestible Economics - 2008
- The Age of Instability - 2010

In 2007, reviewer Larry Prusak described The Dragon and The Elephant as "one of the best of breed of such books".
