= Adam Parsons =

English television and radio presenter

Adam Parsons (born 15 July 1970 in London) is an English television and radio presenter. He is Jerusalem Correspondent for Sky News.

== Early life ==
Parsons attended The Haberdashers' Aske's Boys' School in Elstree, and studied Modern History at St Anne's College, Oxford. Parsons started his career at the Watford Observer newspaper.

Before joining the BBC in May 2001, he launched the sports section of the Sunday Business newspaper, and was the paper's sports editor, becoming the youngest sports editor of a British national newspaper. He was previously motor racing correspondent of The Sunday Times and has written widely about Formula One.

== Broadcasting career ==
Parsons was a sports correspondent for BBC News, appearing regularly on BBC One, BBC Radio and BBC News, the BBC's 24-hour rolling news channel. He co-presented Your News, shown on the BBC News Channel at the weekends. His other work for the BBC included a special report for Panorama, the current affairs programme, and he was also a familiar voice across BBC Radio. Whilst the 2012 Olympic bid process was taking place, Parsons worked as the BBC's Olympic bid specialist.

He was nominated for the Sports News Reporter award at the Royal Television Society Sports Awards in 2003, though the award eventually went to Channel 4 News' Sue Turton.

During his time at the BBC, Parsons reported on every major sporting event, including the FIFA World Cup, the Olympic Games, Formula One, Ashes Cricket and England's triumph in the 2003 Rugby World Cup.

After spells with the British Olympic Association and Travelodge, Parsons returned to the BBC in 2011 as a presenter on the BBC News Channel and on BBC World News. He has presented programmes on Radio 5 Live and also presented the business news on the BBC News Channel.

On 7 October 2012, he presented BBC Breakfast with Sally Nugent. From July 2013 until August 2016, he was the main presenter of the daily Radio 5 Live programme Wake Up to Money. He also presented the business and finance news on 5 Live's Breakfast programme.

He moved to the BBC's Newsnight programme in 2016.

In January 2017, he moved to Sky News to take over as the network's business correspondent. He reports on business and economic stories in the UK and abroad. He also reports on major news stories, including the Grenfell Tower fire, the Manchester Arena bombing and the Catalan independence campaign. In August 2019, he switched roles to become Sky's Europe correspondent. He has reported on many major stories, including Brexit, European politics, Covid and the war in Ukraine.

== Other positions ==
Parsons left the BBC in 2009 to take over as the Director of Communications and Public Affairs at the British Olympic Association. During this period, he served as Team GB's press attaché at the 2010 Winter Olympics in Vancouver. He later had a spell as Director of Communications for Travelodge, one of Britain's biggest hotel companies.

== Writing ==
Parsons has written two books on Motor Racing - F1: Through the Eyes of Damon Hill, and Five Days of a Grand Prix.
