= Match of the Day Kickabout =

2011–2021 British children's TV series

- Genre: Children's
- Presented by: Ben Shires (2015–2021)
- Country of origin: United Kingdom
- Original language: English

Production
- Production location: dock10 studios
- Running time: 15 minutes

Original release
- Network: CBBC; BBC Two
- Release: 8 January 2011 – 27 March 2021

Related
- Match of the Day; Match of the Day 2 Match of the Day 3

Match of the Day Kickabout (MOTD/KA) is a British children's television football programme that was broadcast on CBBC. It was previously presented by Ore Oduba and Radzi Chinyanganya. In its later series, it was hosted by Ben Shires, Kenzie Benali, John Farnworth and Liam MacDevitt. It was a spin-off from the long running weekly Match of the Day. It also replaced former Newsround spin-off Sportsround.

== Format ==
The show features special guests, quizzes, and footballers answering questions about their team-mates. It also includes Premier League highlights, the WSL and the SPFL, formats called Rated and Street Five, and child-oriented videos called Your Skills.
