= John Craven =

English journalist and television presenter

John Craven OBE FLS
- Born: John Raymond Craven; 16 August 1940 (age 85); Leeds, West Riding of Yorkshire, England
- Occupations: Journalist and broadcaster
- Employer: BBC
- Known for: Presenting: Newsround; Countryfile; Beat the Brain; Multi-Coloured Swap Shop

John Raymond Craven OBE FLS (born 16 August 1940) is an English journalist and television presenter, best known for presenting the BBC programmes Newsround, Countryfile and Beat the Brain.

== Early life ==
John Raymond Craven was born in Leeds, West Riding of Yorkshire, and educated at Leeds Modern School. Craven's father was held as a prisoner of war in Japan for three years during the Second World War. He left school aged 16, and began an apprenticeship at Yorkshire Copperworks, writing for the company magazine.

== Career ==
Craven began his professional life in print journalism as a junior reporter on a local newspaper, the Harrogate Advertiser, before working for the Yorkshire Post and as a freelance correspondent and writer for national newspapers.

=== Television ===
Craven joined the BBC staff in Newcastle upon Tyne to work on local radio and television, before moving to the BBC in Bristol in 1970. From 1972 until 1989, Craven was the eponymous host of a regular children's news programme, Newsround, originally called John Craven's Newsround. The first such programme ever produced by British television, it drew on the full journalistic resources of the BBC. It featured a number of news scoops, including the Space Shuttle Challenger disaster in 1986, which occurred minutes before the programme went on air.

Craven became associated with children's TV, and presented news items on other children's programmes such as Multi-Coloured Swap Shop and Saturday Superstore. Years later he also became editor of Newsround. Craven left the Newsround programme in 1989, having presented more than 3,000 episodes, and began presenting a countryside news programme, Countryfile, for the BBC.

In 2015, he presented the BBC Two game show series Beat the Brain, which began airing on 11 May.

=== Other work ===
In 2014, Craven took part in Gareth Malone's All Star Choir. They released a cover version of the single "Wake Me Up" in November 2014 to raise money for the BBC's Children in Need charity. The choir were filmed for a two-part documentary called Gareth's All Star Choir. It was shown on 3 and 10 November 2014 on BBC One.

=== Charity ===
Craven is one of nine presidents of the Young People's Trust for the Environment. He is vice-president of the Waterways Trust and Patron of SPANA. On 10 July 2016, he was appointed as President of Radio Horton, the charitable hospital radio station for Banbury's Horton General Hospital.

== Personal life ==
Craven is married and has two daughters. He lives in Oxfordshire. Of his career, he has said he expected he would be retired at some future time rather than give up the work he liked so much.

== Awards and honours ==
In 1996, he was elected a member of the Royal Television Society, and awarded the RTS Baird Medal in 2002. He was awarded the OBE in the 2000 New Year Honours for services to rural and children's broadcasting. He is a fellow of the Linnean Society of London. In November 2011, Craven attended the British Academy Children's Awards to collect a Special Award for Newsround in recognition of its contribution to television.
