= Laura Jones (journalist) =

British television journalist (born 1975)

- Born: 1975 (age 49–50)
- Occupation: journalist

Laura Jones (born 1975) is a British television journalist who is best known for her work on the popular children's television programme Newsround.

She was born in Aberystwyth, Wales, but spent most of her childhood in Lampeter, also in Wales. Laura worked as a journalist for BBC News in Wales before joining Newsround in 2002.

During her career to date Jones has reported from locations across the world, including a visit to New Orleans in 2005 to report on the aftermath of Hurricane Katrina.

She was also a presenter on Your News on BBC News until the programme ended in December 2008.

Since January 2009, Jones can be seen presenting the sports bulletins on the BBC News.

Jones studied Modern Languages at Aston University, Birmingham.
