= 2025 BBC Sports Personality of the Year Award =

Sports award in the UK

BBC Sports Personality of the Year 2025
- Date: 18 December 2025
- Location: dock10 studios, Salford
- Country: United Kingdom
- Presented by: BBC
- Hosted by: Clare Balding; Gabby Logan; Alex Scott
- Winner: Rory McIlroy
- Website: BBC Sports Personality

Television/radio coverage
- Network: BBC One; BBC One HD

The 2025 BBC Sports Personality of the Year was a sporting awards show which took place on 18 December 2025. Broadcast live from MediaCity in Salford on BBC One and BBC iPlayer, it was presented by Clare Balding, Gabby Logan and Alex Scott.

The BBC Sports Personality of the Year Award was won by Rory McIlroy, with Ellie Kildunne in second place and Lando Norris in third.

For the first time since 2003, the BBC Sports Unsung Hero Award was not awarded.

== Nominees ==
The nominees for the main award, the BBC Sports Personality of the Year Award, were announced on 11 December 2025 on BBC Breakfast.

The judging panel included athletes Maggie Alphonsi, Anita Asante, Libby Clegg, Carl Frampton and Ebony Rainford-Brent, broadcasters Josh Denzel and Kelly Cates, Riath Al-Samarrai from the Daily Mail, Molly Hudson from The Times and Alex Kay-Jelski, Philip Bernie and Marc Vesty from BBC Sport.

In a first for the awards, the voting was paused half way through the show, with the six nominees whittled down to three. Voting then reopened before the winner was announced at the end of the show. The BBC did not reveal or make public the voting statistics at any point during the show, or following the broadcast.

Rory McIlroy won the award, becoming only the third golfer to win after Dai Rees in 1957 and Sir Nick Faldo in 1989. McIlroy himself had been runner-up in 2014, the last time a golfer had finished in the top three. McIlroy also became the fourth winner from Northern Ireland after Lady Mary Peters in 1972, Barry McGuigan in 1985 and Sir Tony McCoy in 2010. Jonathan Rea was the last person from Northern Ireland to finish in the top three when he was a runner-up in 2017.

Ellie Kildunne was the runner-up, becoming the first rugby union player to finish in the top three since Leigh Halfpenny was the runner-up in 2013. Kildunne is the first female rugby player to be nominated for the award.

Lando Norris finished in third position. The last Formula One driver to finish in the top three was Sir Lewis Hamilton when he won in 2020.

The reigning holder of the award, Keely Hodgkinson and winner of the Lifetime Achievement Award winner Thierry Henry presented the award.

Nominees for the 2025 BBC Sports Personality of the Year Award
Nominee	Sport	2025 Achievement
Rory McIlroy	Golf	McIlroy completed the Grand Slam after a dramatic play-off win at The Masters. His first Major since 2014, McIlroy became the sixth man in the modern era to achieve such a feat. At the Ryder Cup, he contributed three-and-a-half points as Team Europe won for the first time in the US since 2012. Further victories came at the Players Championships, AT&T Pebble Beach Pro-Am, Irish Open and Race to Dubai.
Ellie Kildunne	Rugby union	At the Rugby World Cup in England, Kildunne scored five tries for England, including a solo try in the final against Canada. She also scored four tries in England's Six Nations title, as well as scoring fourteen tries for Harlequins.
Lando Norris	Formula One	Becoming the eleventh Briton to win the Formula One World Championship, Norris was behind in the championship race until a series of back-to-back wins propelled him into the lead. The season came down to the final race at Abu Dhabi, which secured McLaren their first driver's championship since 2008.
Hannah Hampton	Football	At the European Championships, Hampton saved two penalties to help England win the final and was named Player of the Match. She was also included in the Team of the Tournament and won the Yashin Trophy. She also helped Chelsea win the domestic treble and was the joint winner of the WSL Golden Glove.
Chloe Kelly	Football	Kelly scored the decisive penalty in the final to win the European Championships for England, as well as a penalty in the quarter-final and a late goal in the semi-final, which saw her named in the Team of the Tournament. She also played a key role in Arsenal's Champions League win.
Luke Littler	Darts	Littler began the year with success at the World Championships at only 17, the youngest world champion in the sport's history. He then won at the World Matchplay. He also triumphed at the Grand Slam of Darts, which elevated him to World Number One, the youngest man to achieve such a position.

== Other awards ==
=== The Helen Rollason Award ===
The BBC Sports Personality of the Year Helen Rollason Award was awarded to Sergio Aguiar and David Stancombe, two of the fathers of the three girls who died in the 2024 Southport stabbings: Alice da Silva Aguiar, Elsie Dot Stancombe and Bebe King. Following the attack, they ran the 2025 London Marathon together, raising money for young people in the local community. John Bishop and Robbie Fowler presented them with the award.

=== Lifetime Achievement Award ===
The winner of the BBC Sports Personality of the Year Lifetime Achievement Award was awarded to Thierry Henry, which was announced on 17 December 2025. This was awarded to Henry for his contributions to sport on and off the football pitch. His footballing career saw him become the record goalscorer for both Arsenal and France and lift the 1998 FIFA World Cup and 2000 European Championships. He "redefined the striker role with his blend of prolific goalscoring, pace and flair, inspiring generations of players and fans." Henry has also continued in football as a coach, pundit and ambassador, as well as mentoring young talent, advocating for diversity in sport and championing social causes.

Henry was awarded the trophy on the night, presented with it by his children: Tea, Tatiana, Tia and Gabriel.

=== World Sport Star of the Year ===
On 9 December 2025, the nominees were announced for the BBC Sports Personality World Sport Star of the Year, with the public vote opening on the same day.

Duplantis won the award and recorded a video message, which was shown on the night.

Nominees for the 2025 BBC Sports Personality World Sport Star of the Year
Nationality	Nominee	Sport	2025 Achievement
Swedish	Armand Duplantis	Athletics	At the World Athletics Championships, Duplantis won a third pole vault world title, in doing so setting a new world record of 6.30m. This was his fourth world record of 2025 and fourteenth of his career. He won all sixteen events he entered across the years, becoming the first pole vaulter to go undefeated across two years. He was named the World Athlete of the Year for a third time.
Spanish	Mariona Caldentey	Football	Caldentey was instrumental in Arsenal's Champions League victory over her former club Barcelona. 19 goals in 41 appearances in the WSL saw her crowned PFA Women's Players' Player of the Year and WSL Player of the Year. She also scored for Spain in the European Championships final and was runner up for the Ballon d'Or.
American	Terence Crawford	Boxing	Crawford became the first male boxer to be undisputed champion across three weight divisions in the four-belt era. Going up two weights to face Canelo Álvarez, he secured victory in a unanimous decision. In claiming the WBA (Super), WBC, IBF, WBO and The Ring belts, he extended his record to 42 straight victories, the last 20 being professional fights.
American	Sydney McLaughlin-Levrone	Athletics	Switching from 400 metres hurdles to 400 metres flat, McLaughlin-Levrone became the first athlete to win career world titles in both disciplines. Her time at the World Athletics Championships of 47.78 was the second fastest in history and is now undefeated across both disciplines for two years. She won another gold at the championships in the 4x400m relay and was named World Athlete of the Year.
Japanese	Shohei Ohtani	Baseball	Helping the LA Dodgers to retain their World Series title, Ohtani smashed three home runs and struck ten batters out against the Milwaukee Brewers. This made him the first pitcher to hit three home runs in the same game since 1940. He was named as one of Major League Baseball's Most Valuable Players for a third time running.
Egyptian	Mohamed Salah	Football	Salah scored 29 goals in the Premier League to help Liverpool secure the top flight. He became the first player to win the Golden Boot, Playmaker of the Season and Player of the Season in the same campaign. He was also named PFA Players' Player of the Year and FWA Footballer of the Year. He also surpassed Sergio Agüero's record as highest-scoring overseas player in the Premier League.

=== Coach of the Year ===
The BBC Sports Personality of the Year Coach Award was awarded to Sarina Wiegman by Tommy Fleetwood and Dame Denise Lewis. The nominees were revealed in the show.

Nominees for the 2025 BBC Sports Personality Coach Award
Coach	Team	Sport	2025 Achievement
Sarina Wiegman	England	Football	Wiegman led England to back-to-back European Championships.
Luke Donald	Team Europe	Golf	On American soil, Donald steered Europe to a Ryder Cup victory.
Andy Farrell	British & Irish Lions	Rugby union	Farrell managed the Lions to a defining series win over Australia in the test series.
John Mitchell	England	Rugby union	In an unbeaten year, Mitchell led England to Six Nations and World Cup triumphs.
Renée Slegers	Arsenal	Football	Slegers' coaching took Arsenal to Champions League success.
Andrea Stella	McLaren	Formula One	Under Stella's management, McLaren won both the Constructors and Drivers titles.

=== Young Sports Personality of the Year ===
On 2 December 2025, the nominees for the BBC Young Sports Personality of the Year were announced on Greg James' Radio 1 Breakfast show.

Harry Aikines-Aryeetey, who won this award in 2005, and Lucy Bronze presented the award.

Nominees for the 2025 Young Sports Personality of the Year
Nominee	Sport	2025 Achievement
Michelle Agyemang	Football	Agyemang, months after her debut, was instrumental in England's success at the European Championships, delivering consecutive back-to-back last minute equalisers in the quarter final and semi final. She was named Young Player of the Tournament.
Luke Littler	Darts	Littler became the youngest darts player to become PDC World Darts Champion at just seventeen. He followed that with a series of other tournament successes, including the UK Open, World Matchplay and World Grand Prix, becoming the youngest ever number one.
Davina Perrin	Cricket	Perrin was England's second-highest run scorer in the Under-19 Women's T20 World Cup and was named in the Team of the Tournament. At The Hundred, in the eliminator, she smashed 101 off just 43 balls for Northern Superchargers, which was the fastest century by a woman in the format's history.

=== Team of the Year ===
For the first time the public could vote for the BBC Sports Team of the Year Award, with the nominations announced 15 December 2025.

Sir Tony McCoy and Hannah Cockroft presented the award to Rory McIlroy and Tommy Fleetwood, the members of the team who were present on the night.

2025 BBC Sport Team of the Year Award
Nominee	Sport	2025 Achievement
Team Europe	Golf	For only the fifth time, and first time since 2012, Team Europe triumphed on foreign soil in the Ryder Cup, with Luke Donald's men overcoming hostile crowds. They had a record lead of seven points after dominating in the foursomes and fourballs and held off a resurgent USA on the final day to win the sixth of the last eight Ryder Cups.
England women's football team	Football	England retained the European Championships, becoming the first England team to win a major football tournament on foreign soil. They came from behind in all three of the knockout games and became the only team in Euros history to go to extra time in three different games.
England women's rugby union team	Rugby union	England won the World Cup on home soil in front of a record crowd, lifting the trophy for the first time since 2014, extending their unbeaten record to 33 consecutive matches. They also won a seventh consecutive Six Nations.

== In memoriam ==
Accompanying the tributes to sports stars who had died across the past year was the Bantam of the Opera choir, a choir of Bradford City fans to mark the 40th anniversary of the Bradford City stadium fire and to celebrate Bradford's year as the UK City of Culture.

- Billy Bonds, football
- Tony Book, football
- Thelma Hopkins, athletics, hockey & squash
- Maeve Kyle, athletics & hockey
- Imran Sherwani, hockey
- Tommie Jakes, horse racing
- Geoff Lewis, horse racing
- Peter Easterby, horse racing
- Ray French, rugby league
- Robin Smith, cricket
- David Lawrence, cricket
- Peter Lever, cricket
- Wayne Larkins, cricket
- Gerry Harrison, broadcasting
- John Rowlinson, broadcasting
- Nathan Sweeney, broadcasting
- Uriah Rennie, football
- Billy Vigar, football
- Joe Thompson, football
- Barry Hoban, cycling
- Brian Waites, golf
- Fuzzy Zoeller, golf
- Robin Williams, blind football
- Anne Dunham, para equestrian dressage
- Andrew Cassell, paralympic sailing
- Lenny Wilkens, basketball
- Lusanda Dumke, rugby union
- Boris Spassky, chess
- Owen Jenner, motorsport
- Felix Baumgartner, extreme sport
- Shane Richardson, motorsport
- Dick McTaggart, boxing
- Georgia O'Connor, boxing
- John Cooney, boxing
- Ricky Hatton, boxing
- Denis Law, football
- Dickie Bird, cricket
- Eddie Jordan, motorsport
- Angela Mortimer Barrett, tennis
- André Silva, football
- Diogo Jota, football
- Brian Glanville, journalism
- Colin Hart, journalism
- Patrick Barclay, journalism
- Milan Mandarić, football
- Rod Thomas, football
- George Eastham, football
- Ian McLauchlan, rugby union
- Geoff Wheel, rugby union
- Richard Sharp, rugby union
- Domini Lawrence, equestrian
- Barry Hills, horse racing
- Michael O'Sullivan, horse racing
- Doug Laughton, rugby league
- Derek Whitehead, rugby league
- Mark Jones, rugby league & union
- Joey Jones, football
- John Clark, football
- Peter McParland, football
- Matt Beard, football
- Ethan McLeod, football
- Joe Bugner, boxing
- George Foreman, boxing
