= 2021 BBC Sports Personality of the Year Award =

Sports award in the UK

BBC Sports Personality of the Year
- Date: 19 December 2021
- Location: dock10 studios, Salford
- Country: United Kingdom
- Presented by: BBC
- Hosted by: Gary Lineker; Clare Balding; Gabby Logan; Alex Scott
- Winner: Emma Raducanu
- Website: BBC Sports Personality

Television/radio coverage
- Network: BBC One; BBC One HD
- Runtime: 135 minutes

The BBC Sports Personality of the Year 2021 took place on 19 December 2021 at the dock10 studios in Salford. Gary Lineker, Clare Balding, Gabby Logan, and Alex Scott all returned to present the awards show.

The event was broadcast live on BBC One. Due to the COVID-19 pandemic, there was no studio audience, rather just fifty special guests.

== Nominees ==
The nominees for the award were revealed on 13 December 2021. The panel deciding the shortlist was made up of athletes Jeanette Kwakye, Hannah Miley, and Neil Lennon, sports broadcasters Jason Mohammad and Andy Stevenson, sports journalists Molly Mcelwee, Ben Burrows, and Richard Morgans, and from the BBC Barbara Slater, Philip Bernie, and Gabby Cook.

Emma Raducanu won the award, becoming the fifth different tennis player to win the award, and the first since Andy Murray, who last won it in 2016. Raducanu was also the first woman to win since Zara Phillips, won in 2006. Runner-up Tom Daley, who has won the Young Sports Personality of the Year three times, became the first diver to finish in the top three. Adam Peaty, who finished third was the first swimmer to finish in the top three since Rebecca Adlington's third-place finish in 2008.

Cyclists Jason and Laura Kenny presented the awards. Raducanu was not in the studio but was live over video link to accept the award.

Nominee	Sport	2021 Achievement
Emma Raducanu	Tennis	Made history as the first ever Open Era qualifier to win a Grand Slam title when she became women's singles champion at the US Open, achieving an unprecedented 10 straight-sets victories in what was only the second major she entered. Also the first British woman in 44 years to win a Grand Slam singles title and the youngest champion in 17 years.
Tom Daley	Diving	Crowned Olympic champion in his fourth Games participation when he and partner Matty Lee won gold in the men's synchronized 10 metre platform. Also won bronze in the men's 10 metre platform.
Adam Peaty	Swimming	The first British swimmer to retain an Olympic title by virtue of his winning a second straight gold in the men's 100 metre breaststroke. Was also part of the 4 x 100 metre relay teams that won mixed medley gold (in world record time) and men's medley silver.
Tyson Fury	Boxing	Retained his WBC heavyweight belt after an extraordinary third match with Deontay Wilder, during which both fighters traded multiple knockdowns.
Raheem Sterling	Football	Scored three goals in Euro 2020 as part of an English team that advanced to the final for the first time in their history, and named as part of UEFA's team of the tournament. Also scored 10 goals to help Manchester City win their third Premier League title in four years.
Sarah Storey	Cycling	Successfully defended three Paralympic titles (C4-5 road race and C5 time trial / individual pursuit) to become a 17-time Paralympic champion, making her the most successful British Paralympian of all time.

== Other awards ==
=== Young Sports Personality of the Year ===
On 15 December 2021, the three-person shortlist for the Young Sports Personality of the Year Award was announced. The panel included athletes Ellie Simmonds, Aimee Fuller, and Regan Grace, and representatives from Blue Peter, the Youth Sports Trust, and BBC Sport.

Diver Matty Lee presented the award.

Winner and Nominees of the 2021 BBC Young Sports Personality of the Year Award
Nominee	Sport	2021 Achievements
Sky Brown	Skateboarding	Became Great Britain's youngest ever Olympic medallist, when she won bronze in the park competition at the Olympics. Had won gold in the same event at the X Games.
Jude Bellingham	Football	Became the youngest Englishman to play at a major tournament when appearing at the Euros, which followed a successful first season at Borussia Dortmund.
Ellie Challis	Para swimming	Became Great Britain's youngest medallist at the Paralympics when she won a silver medal in the 50m backstroke at the Paralympics.

=== Helen Rollason Award ===
The Helen Rollason Award was awarded to Jen Beattie, an Arsenal and Scotland footballer, who had been diagnosed with breast cancer in October 2020 but continued to play football, as well as speaking about her illness to encourage others to get screened.

Before the awards show, Arsenal teammate Leah Williamson presented the trophy to Beattie, as they were unable to be there in person due to fixture commitments.

=== Unsung Hero Award ===
The Unsung Hero Award was won by Sam Barlow from Kingston upon Hull for her work encouraging people to get active, delivery of sports programmes in local schools, and using fitness as a way of talking about loss.

Swimmer Rebecca Adlington presented the award.

=== Lifetime Achievement Award ===
On 18 December 2021, gymnast Simone Biles was announced as the recipient of this year's Year Lifetime Achievement Award for her gymnastics career, and for speaking publicly about abuse and her mental health struggles.

=== World Sport Star Award ===
The World Sport Star of the Year was won by Rachael Blackmore after an online public vote. Blackmore could not receive the award in person because she was still at Manchester Airport due to a delayed flight.

Winner and Nominees of the 2021 BBC Sports Personality World Sport Star of the Year
Nationality	Nominee	Sport	2021 Achievement
Ireland	Rachael Blackmore	Horse racing	Became the first female jockey to win the Grand National, and the first female jockey to be the leading jockey at the Cheltenham Festival.
Mexico	Canelo Álvarez	Boxing	Went undefeated in the year to retain his titles and add the WBO and IBF super middleweight titles to his belt, becoming the undisputed championship at that weight.
United States	Tom Brady	American Football	Having started the season injured, Brady came back to have another successful year.
Serbia	Novak Djokovic	Tennis	Won the Australian Open, French Open and Wimbledon to become only the third man to complete the career double Grand Slam.
Jamaica	Elaine Thompson-Herah	Athletics	At the Olympics, became a triple Olympic champion with gold medals in the 100m, 200m, and 4 × 100 m relay.
Netherlands	Max Verstappen	Formula One	Became the Formula One World Drivers' Champions for the first time with victory in the final race of the season.

=== Team of the Year and Coach of the Year ===
The Team of the Year Award and Coach of the Year Award were presented together. The England men's national football team took home the Team of the Year Award for reaching the final of the European Championships. Their manager Gareth Southgate was awarded Coach of the Year for leading the team there.

Hannah Cockroft presented both awards.

== In Memoriam ==
- Ian St John
- Jimmy Greaves
- Ray Kennedy
- Colin Bell
- Ron Flowers
- Barbara Inkpen
- Manolo Santana
- Paul Nihill
- Brian London
- Sebastian Eubank
- Leon Spinks
- Marvelous Marvin Hagler
- Frank Worthington
- Glenn Roeder
- Paul Mariner
- Roger Hunt
- Lloyd Cowan
- Ron Hill
- Dorothy Manley
- Alan Hart
- Kevin Gearey
- Lance Hardy
- Jeanette Altwegg
- David Jenkins
- Simon Terry
- Doug Mountjoy
- Max Mosley
- Bertie Auld
- Lee Elder
- Eileen Ash
- John Edrich
- Ted Dexter
- Walter Smith
- Jim McLean
- Tommy Docherty
- Andy Fordham
- David Heaton
- George Monaghan
- James Muirhead
- Gerd Muller
- Mike Smith
- Dai Davies
- Gillian Sheen
- David Rose
- Jeff Grayshon
- Siobhan Cattigan
- Julie Chipchase
- Peter Lorimer
- Terry Cooper
- Jacques Rogge
- Gerald Sinstadt
- Renton Laidlaw
- Steve Docherty
- Sabine Schmitz
- Lorna Brooke
- Trevor Hemmings
- Joe Mercer
- John Pullin
- Sandy Carmichael
- John Dawes
- Frank Williams
- Murray Walker
