= BBC Sports Personality of the Year Lifetime Achievement Award =

- Country: United Kingdom
- Presented by: BBC Sports Personality of the Year
- First award: 1996; 30 years ago
- Most recent winner: Thierry Henry (2025)

The BBC Sports Personality of the Year Lifetime Achievement Award is an award given annually as part of the BBC Sports Personality of the Year ceremony each December. The award is given to a sportsperson "who has made a major impact on the world of sport during their lifetime". The winner is selected by BBC Sport. When football manager Alex Ferguson won the award in 2001, the BBC described the award as "a new accolade" to be presented annually; however, two people had already received the Lifetime Achievement Award.

== History ==
The inaugural recipient of the award was Frank Bruno in 1996, who won it after his retirement from boxing that year. Bruno was the favourite to win the main award in 1995, but lost to Damon Hill, causing many to criticise his Lifetime Achievement Award as being a consolation award. Spanish golfer Seve Ballesteros won the award the following year, but after that the award was not presented for three years. The award has been presented annually since Ferguson ended the hiatus in 2001. Five of the eleven recipients have been associated with football; tennis and golf are the only other sports to have been represented more than once. Tennis player Martina Navratilova was the first woman to have won the award. The only recipient of the award on multiple occasions is Ballesteros who won in 1997 and again in 2009, for his contribution to golf winning "the Open three times, the Masters twice as well as playing an inspirational role in the Ryder Cup". The most recent winner, in 2025, was footballer Thierry Henry.

== Winners ==
=== By year ===
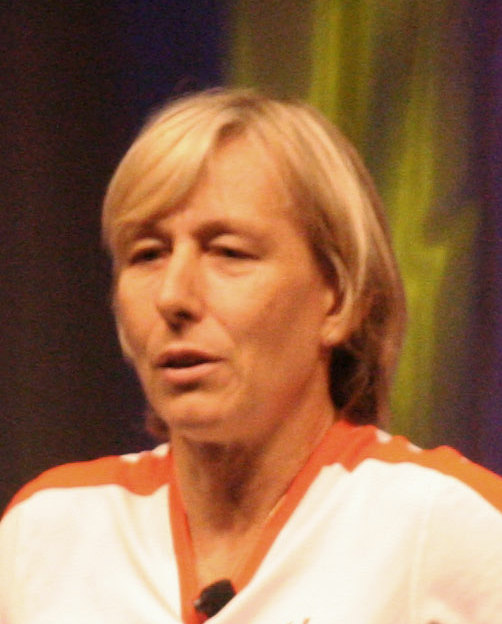
Martina Navratilova, winner in 2003, was the first female recipient of the award

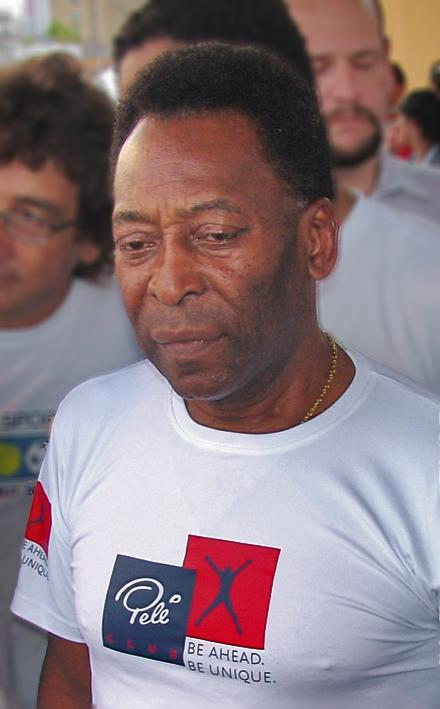
Pelé, the winner in 2005

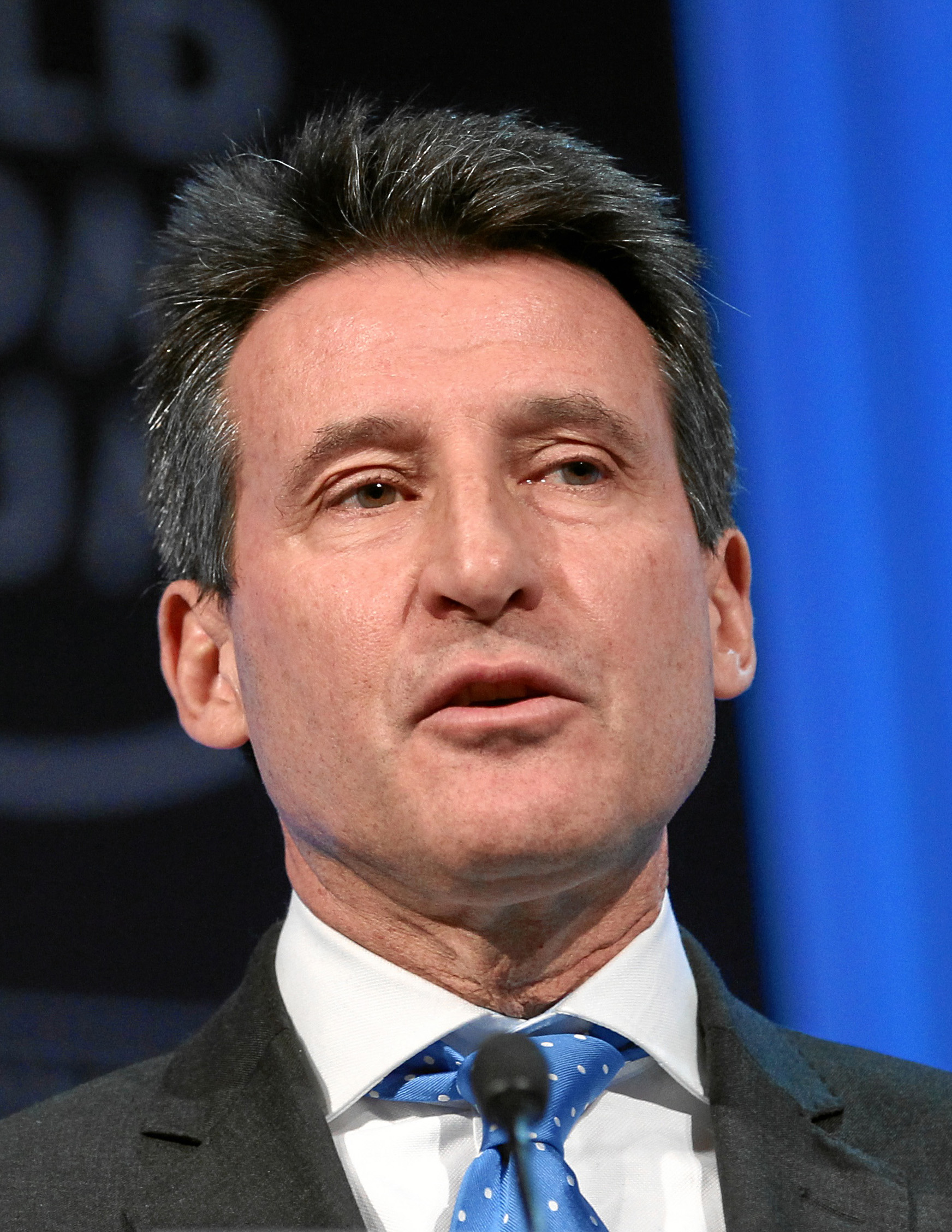
Sebastian Coe, the winner in 2012

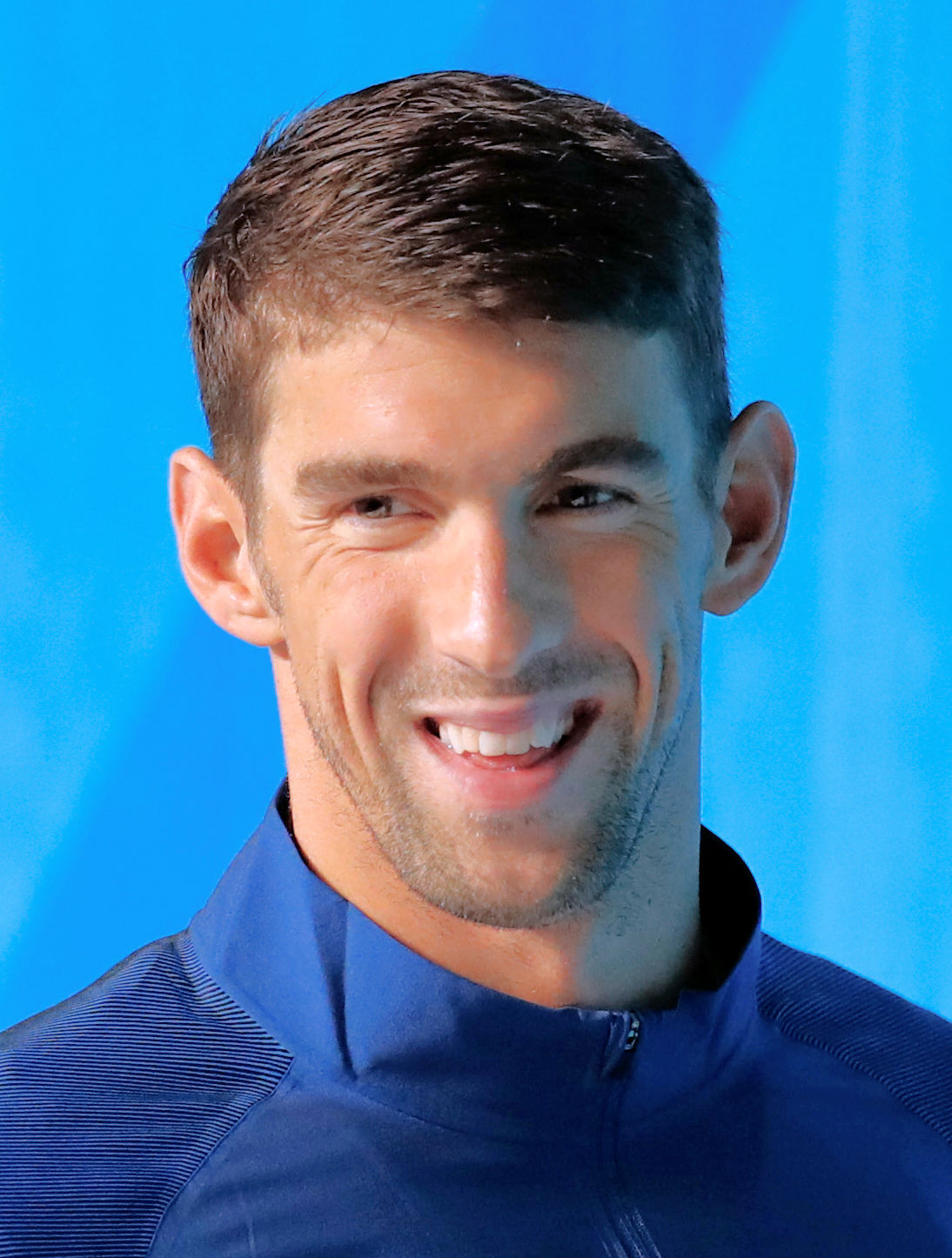
2016 winner Michael Phelps has competed in four Olympic Games

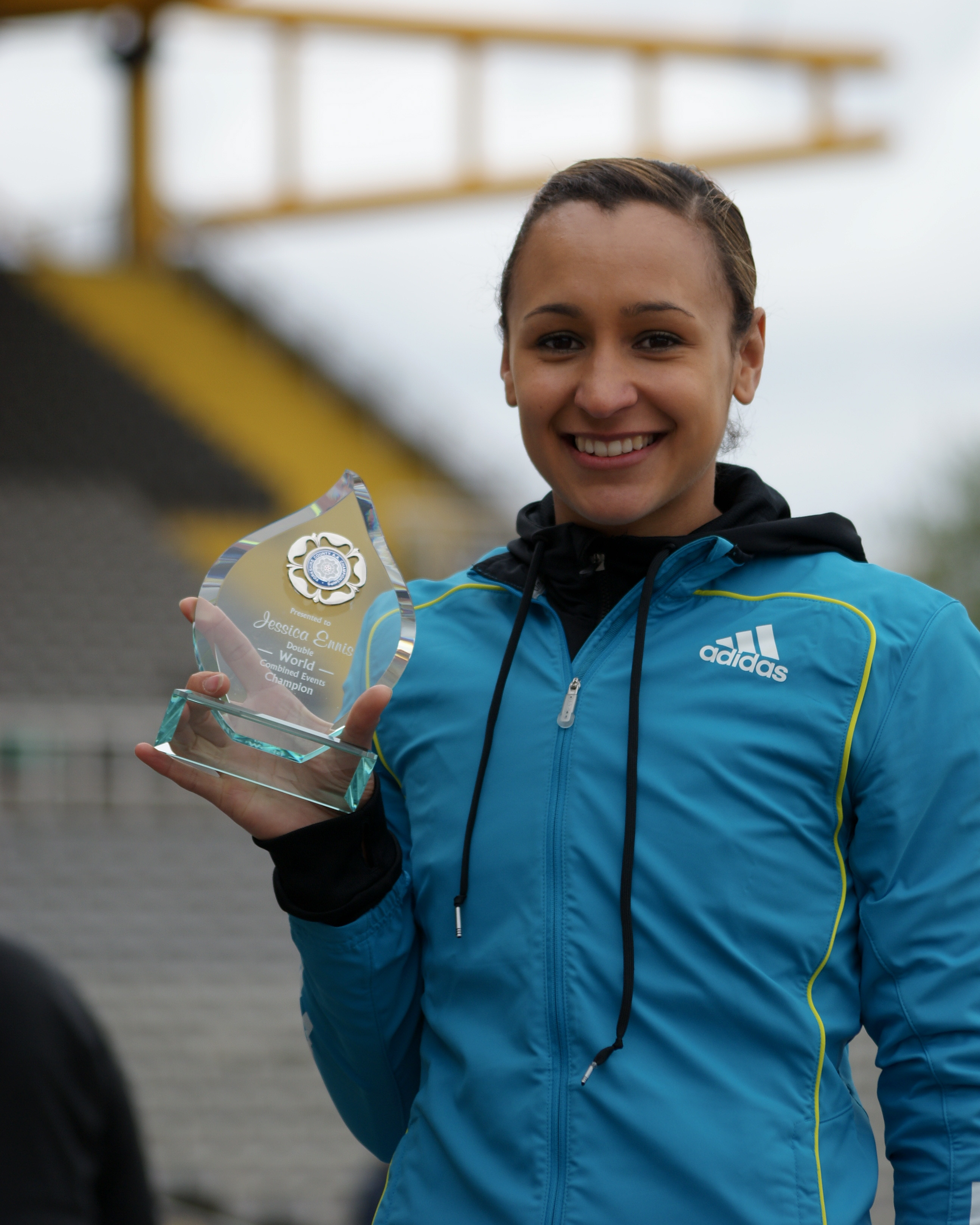
2017 recipient Jessica Ennis-Hill was the first female winner since 2003

BBC Sports Personality of the Year Lifetime Achievement Award winners
Year	Nationality	Winner	Sport	Rationale	Ref.
1996	United Kingdom	Frank Bruno	Boxing	For his contributions to boxing which include winning the WBC heavyweight title.	
1997	Spain	Seve Ballesteros	Golf	"In recognition of his outstanding contribution to European golf over the last 20 years."	
2001	United Kingdom	Alex Ferguson	Football	For a managing career at Manchester United since 1986 which has won seven league titles and "claimed an unprecedented treble of Premiership, FA Cup and European Cup".	
2002	United Kingdom	George Best	Football	"In recognition of his footballing achievements", which include being named "Footballer of the Year and European Player of the Year in 1968", and winning two championship medals and a European Cup with Manchester United.	
2003	United States	Martina Navratilova	Tennis	"For a trophy-laden tennis career spanning 30 years, (...) winning a record 167 singles titles and an astonishing 329 trophies overall, 140 ahead of her nearest rival."	
2004	United Kingdom	Ian Botham	Cricket	"For services to cricket" where he played 102 Tests for England in his 15-year career as an all-rounder. During that time he took 383 wickets, which was the highest number for England until 2015 (currently third on the list) and scored 5,200 runs.	
2005	Brazil	Pelé	Football	For having a professional career in which "he scored 1,280 goals in 1,363 games" and "made 92 appearances for Brazil, scoring 77 goals" and winning three of the four World Cups he played in.	
2006	Sweden	Björn Borg	Tennis	For "dazzl[ing] the world of tennis in the 1970s and 1980s, winning 11 Grand Slam titles" including 5 Wimbledon championships.	
2007	United Kingdom	Bobby Robson	Football	For "his contributions as both player and manager in a career spanning more than half a century"	
2008	United Kingdom	Bobby Charlton	Football	For achievements that include helping "England to World Cup success in 1966 and [leading] Manchester United to European Cup glory in 1968, scoring twice in the final".	
2009	Spain	Seve Ballesteros	Golf	For his contributions to golf which include winning "the Open three times, the Masters twice (and) playing an inspirational role in the Ryder Cup".	
2010	United Kingdom	David Beckham	Football	For his playing career as well as his roles in the London 2012 Olympic bid and his central role in attempting to bring the 2018 World Cup to England	
2011	United Kingdom	Steve Redgrave	Rowing	For "his huge contribution to rowing, his long and extraordinary career, and his ongoing commitment to promoting sport in the UK"	
2012	United Kingdom	Sebastian Coe	Athletics	For his role in both London's bid for, and organisation of the hosting of, the 2012 Summer Olympic and Paralympic games.	
2014	United Kingdom	Chris Hoy	Cycling	For winning six Olympic gold medals, more than any other British sportsperson in history, as well as 11 golds at the UCI Track Cycling World Championships.	
2015	United Kingdom	AP McCoy	Horse racing	For an unprecedented career in horse racing, being Champion Jockey for every season of his 20-year professional career and riding over 4,300 winners – including the Grand National, two Cheltenham Gold Cups, three Champion Hurdles and the Champion Chase.	
2016	United States	Michael Phelps	Swimming	For a career in which he has won 23 Olympic gold medals, 3 silver medals and 2 bronzes across 4 games, including a record breaking eight gold medals at the 2008 Beijing Olympics.	
2017	United Kingdom	Jessica Ennis-Hill	Athletics	For being one of only 12 British women to win an Olympic gold medal in athletics. Ennis-Hill is the 2012 Olympic champion, three-time world champion and 2010 European champion.	
2018	United States	Billie Jean King	Tennis	For changing perceptions of what it meant to be a woman in sport following her historic victory in the Battle of the Sexes and for founding the Women's Tennis Association and the Women's Sports Foundation. Winner of 39 Grand Slam titles.	
2019	United Kingdom	Tanni Grey-Thompson	Para-athletics		
2021	United States	Simone Biles	Gymnastics		
2022	Jamaica	Usain Bolt	Athletics		
2023	United Kingdom	Kenny Dalglish	Football		
2024	United Kingdom	Mark Cavendish	Cycling	For a career that included a record 35 stage wins at the Tour de France over a 16 year period, as well as winning the road race at the world championships in 2011 and winning the madisonworld championship three times in 2005, 2008 and 2016 on the track.	
2025	France	Thierry Henry	Football	For "redefining the striker role with his blend of prolific goalscoring, pace and flair, inspiring generations of players and fans" across a career at Arsenal, Barcelona and France and for mentoring young talent, advocating for diversity in sport and championing social causes.	

=== By nationality ===
Winners by nationality
Nationality	Number of wins
United Kingdom	15
United States	4
Spain	1
Brazil	1
Sweden	1
Jamaica	1
France	1

=== By sport ===
This table lists the total number of awards won by the winners sporting profession.

Winners by sport
Sporting profession	Number of wins
Football	7
Tennis	3
Athletics	3
Cycling	2
Boxing	1
Cricket	1
Golf	1
Gymnastics	1
Horse Racing	1
Rowing	1
Swimming	1
