= 2015 BBC Sports Personality of the Year Award =

Sports award in the UK

- Date: 20 December 2015
- Location: Odyssey Arena, Belfast
- Country: United Kingdom
- Presented by: British Broadcasting Corporation (BBC)
- Hosted by: Gary Lineker; Clare Balding; Gabby Logan
- Winner: Andy Murray
- Website: www.bbc.co.uk/sport/sports-personality

Television/radio coverage
- Network: BBC One; BBC One HD
- Runtime: 140 minutes

The 2015 BBC Sports Personality of the Year Award took place on 20 December 2015 at the Odyssey Arena in Belfast. It was the 62nd presentation of the BBC Sports Personality of the Year Award. Awarded annually by the British Broadcasting Corporation (BBC), the main award honours an individual's British sporting achievement over the past year, with the winner selected by public vote from a twelve-person shortlist.

In addition to the main award, there were seven other awards: Team of the Year, Coach of the Year, Overseas Sports Personality of the Year, Young Sports Personality of the Year, Helen Rollason Award, Lifetime Achievement Award and Unsung Hero.

== Controversy ==
There were calls to remove Tyson Fury from the nominees list, after comments he made were criticised as homophobic and sexist.

== Nominees ==
The nominees were revealed on 30 November 2015.

Nominee	Sport	2015 Achievement	BBC profile	Votes (percentage)
Andy Murray	Tennis	Led Great Britain to victory in the Davis Cup for the first time in 79 years. In doing so, he became only the third player to win 8 singles rubbers (the maximum possible) and the fourth player to win 11 rubbers.		361,446 (35.81%)
Kevin Sinfield	Rugby League	Captained Leeds Rhinos to the treble, winning the Challenge Cup, League Leader's Shield and Super League Grand Final.		278,353 (27.57%)
Jessica Ennis-Hill	Athletics	Won the heptathlon in the IAAF World Championships for the second time, thirteen months after comeback from birth of her first child.		79,898 (7.91%)
Tyson Fury	Boxing	Won three of the four major heavyweight titles (WBA (Super), IBF, and WBO) upon defeating Wladimir Klitschko, who had not been defeated in 12 years prior.		72,330 (7.17%)
Lewis Hamilton	Formula 1	Won the World Drivers' Championship for the third time. Also became the first Briton to successfully defend his title.		48,379 (4.79%)
Chris Froome	Cycling	Won the Tour de France for the second time (the first Briton to do so).		39,007 (3.86%)
Mo Farah	Athletics	Became the first athlete to achieve the long distance "double-double" (5,000 / 10,000 metres) at the IAAF World Championships. Also became the first Briton to win outdoor titles in three World Championships, both consecutively and outright.		31,311 (3.10%)
Max Whitlock	Gymnastics	Won the pommel horse in the World Artistic Gymnastics Championships. Also became the first British male to win a global title, and the first to win three medals in one World Championship.		25,925 (2.57%)
Greg Rutherford	Athletics	Won the long jump in the IAAF World Championships. Also became the fifth Briton to hold Olympic, World, European, and Commonwealth titles simultaneously, and the first to also hold the IAAF Diamond League title.		23,492 (2.33%)
Lizzie Armitstead	Cycling	Successfully defended her title in the UCI Women's Road World Cup (including 3 race victories) and won the road race in the UCI Road World Championships.		22,356 (2.21%)
Adam Peaty	Swimming	Won the 50m/100m breaststroke and the 4 × 100 m mixed medley relay in the FINA World Championships. Set three world records during the season and became the first Briton to claim three world titles in a single championship.		13,738 (1.36%)
Lucy Bronze	Football	Member of the English squad that came third in the FIFA Women's World Cup; she scored 2 goals in the tournament.		13,236 (1.31%)

== Other awards ==
In addition to the main award as "Sports Personality of the Year", several other awards were also announced:

- Overseas Personality: Dan Carter
- Team of the Year: Great Britain Davis Cup team
- Lifetime Achievement: AP McCoy
- Coach of the Year: Michael O'Neill
- Helen Rollason Award: Bailey Matthews
- Young Personality: Ellie Downie
- Unsung Hero Award: Damien Lindsay

== In Memoriam ==
- Howard Kendall
- Jerry Collins Jonah Lomu
- Jules Bianchi Justin Wilson
- Doris Hart Rosalind Rowe
- Bob Appleyard Clive Rice
- Billy Casper Calvin Peete
- Chris Leatherbarrow Derek Turner
- Bobby Campbell Dave Mackay
- Brian Close
- Daniel Topolski
- Ken Graveney Tom Graveney
- Florence Arthaud Camille Muffat Alexis Vastine
- Alan Hodgkinson Ron Springett
- Geoff Duke Dr John Hinds
- Bob Braithwaite Peter Heatly
- Louis Martin Richard Meade
- Richie Benaud
- Peter O'Sullevan
- Yogi Berra Ron Clarke
- Eileen Gray Louise Suggs
- Ernie Lewis Jim Meadowcroft
- Alan Lee Aaron Devlin
- Gerry Byrne Brian Hall
- Marton Fulop
- Pat Eddery
- Geoff Pullar Frank Tyson
- Ayo Falola Sean Kyle
- Raymond Mould Andy King
- Philip Carter Jack Hayward
- Arthur Dorward Jim McCarthy
- Alan Woodward Ralph Milne
- Kirsty Howard Margaret Simons
- Peter Dimmock
- Danny Jones
