= 2010 BBC Sports Personality of the Year Award =

Sports award in the UK

- Date: 19 December 2010
- Location: LG Arena, Birmingham
- Country: United Kingdom
- Presented by: BBC
- Hosted by: Sue Barker; Gary Lineker; Jake Humphrey
- Winner: AP McCoy
- Website: BBC Sports Personality

Television/radio coverage
- Network: BBC One
- Runtime: 125 minutes

The 2010 BBC Sports Personality of the Year Award, held on 19 December, was the 57th presentation of the BBC Sports Personality of the Year Awards. Presented by Sue Barker, Jake Humphrey, and Gary Lineker from the LG Arena in Birmingham, it was broadcast on BBC One. Awarded annually by the BBC, the main titular award honours an individual's British sporting achievement over the past year. The winner is selected by public vote from a 10-person shortlist.

== Award process ==
The ten sportspersons on the award shortlist was drawn up by a "panel of 30 sports editors from national and regional newspapers and magazines", and announced on 29 November 2010. As a preview to the awards, the nominees were interviewed for Sports Personality of the Year: The Contenders, a special edition of BBC One's Inside Sport, presented by Gabby Logan and broadcast on 13 December 2010.

The award ceremony was held on Sunday 19 December at the LG Arena in Birmingham. It was the first time Birmingham had hosted the show since 2007. It was broadcast live on BBC One, with returning presenters Sue Barker, Gary Lineker and Jake Humphrey. The winner was decided by a public telephone vote during the ceremony.

== Winner and nominees ==
The ten nominees featured two from the sport of golf, and one each from athletics, boxing, cricket, cycling, darts, diving, horse racing, and skeleton.

AP McCoy was named the winner, with 41.98% of the vote. McCoy became the first jockey to win the main award of the night, having finished third in 2002. In 1996, Frankie Dettori had also finished in third. McCoy was also only the second person from Northern Ireland to win the award, after Dame Mary Peters. Phil Taylor finished second with 10.33% of the vote, becoming the first darts players to finish in the top three. Jessica Ennis finished in third place, with 9.02% of the vote. Ennis had also finished in third in the previous year.

McCoy was presented the trophy by previous winner Andrew Flintoff and Cesc Fàbregas.

Nominee	Sport	2010 achievement	BBC Profile	Votes (percentage)
AP McCoy	Horse racing	Rode Don't Push It to win the Grand National for the very first time at his 15th attempt, having won more races than any jump jockey in history.		293,152 (41.98%)
Phil Taylor	Darts	Becoming the World Darts Champion for a record 15th time by winning the PDC tournament in January, hitting a double Nine-dart finish in the PDC Premier League Darts and winning a further six major titles during the year.		72,095 (10.33%)
Jessica Ennis	Athletics	Winning the heptathlon gold medal at the European Athletics Championships in Barcelona, as well as winning the pentathlon gold at the World Indoor Championships.		62,953 (9.02%)
Lee Westwood	Golf	Becoming the first European World Number One since 1994, in a season which included victory at the St. Jude Classic, being a runner-up at The Masters and The Open, and key contributions in The Ryder Cup.		58,640 (8.40%)
Graeme McDowell	Golf	Becoming the first European winner of the U.S. Open since 1970 and first person from the UK since 1999 to win a major, scoring 284 at the tournament at Pebble Beach.		52,108 (7.46%)
Tom Daley	Diving	Winning two gold medals in the 10m platform and the synchronized 10m platform at the Commonwealth Games.		50,763 (7.27%)
Mark Cavendish	Cycling	Winning five stages of the Tour de France, followed by taking 3 stages and the Points Jersey in the Vuelta a España		44,170 (6.33%)
Amy Williams	Skeleton	By winning the gold medal in the Women's Skeleton at the Winter Olympics, Williams became the first British individual winter gold medallist in thirty years.		43,056 (6.17%)
Graeme Swann	Cricket	For his spin bowling for England against Bangladesh and Pakistan, and in the World Twenty20 competition, in which Swann was England's leading wicket taker.		13,767 (1.97%)
David Haye	Boxing	Making two successful defences of his WBA World Heavyweight Championship belt, against both John Ruiz and Audley Harrison in an all-British showdown.		7,538 (1.08%)

== Other Awards ==
=== Helen Rollason Award ===
The first award of the night, the Helen Rollason Award, was awarded to Frank Williams, the co-founder and boss of the Williams Formula One team. Since 1986, Williams has been tetraplegic, but despite this the team have won sixteen Formula One World Championships, becoming the third most successful team in the sport's history. Damon Hill presented Williams with the award.

=== Young Sports Personality ===
The shortlist of three for the Young Sports Personality of the Year was whittled down from a longlist of ten, which featured footballer Conor Coady, taekwondo athlete Jade Jones, wheelchair racer Dan Lucker, gymnast Sam Oldham, table tennis player Liam Pitchford, tennis player Laura Robson, and swimmer Emma Saunders. The panel deciding the shortlist was chaired by broadcaster John Inverdale, and also featured BBC Sport presenter Jake Humphrey, Blue Peter's Helen Skelton, Newsround presenter Ore Oduba, and former winners of the award Amy Spencer and Harry Aikines-Aryeetey.

The award was presented by Zara Phillips and Denise Lewis. Tom Daley won the award for the third time, having won it in 2007 and 2009.

Winner and Nominees of the 2010 BBC Young Sports Personality of the Year Award
Nominee	Sport	2010 Achievement
Tom Daley	Diving	Won two golds at the Commonwealth Games to become the second youngest double Commonwealth champion in history.
Zoe Smith	Weightlifting	At the Commonwealth Games, Smith became the first English woman to win a Commonwealth medal, with a bronze in the 58 kg.
Jodie Williams	Athletics	At the World Junior Championships, won gold in the 100m and silver in the 200m. She later recorded a European youth record in the 200m.

=== Unsung Hero Award ===
The Unsung Hero Award was presented to Lance Haggith, a basketball coach. The winner of the BBC East region, Higgins had worked with children and young people of all abilities and disabilities for over thirty years. He had set up two charities to support youngsters in sport, and chaired the Bedfordshire Basketball Association.

=== Team of the Year ===
The Team of the Year Award was awarded to the Europe Ryder Cup Team. Colin Montgomerie collected the award on behalf of the team. The award had previously been awarded to the Ryder Cup team in 1969, 1985, 1987, 1995, and 2002, making this the sixth time it had collected this award.

Winner and Nominees of the 2010 BBC Sports Team of the Year Award
Nominee	Sport	2010 Achievement
Europe Ryder Cup Team	Golf	Behind after two sessions, the Europeans fought back in the Ryder Cup to beat the USA and regain the historic title.
Chelsea F.C.	Football	Won both the Premier League and FA Cup in the same season, the first time the club had achieved such a feat.
England	Cricket	Won the ICC World Twenty20, beating Australia in the final. This was the first time England had won a Cricket World Cup.

=== Overseas Sports Personality ===
The BBC Overseas Sports Personality of the Year was awarded to tennis player Rafael Nadal. After an injury-filled 2009, Nadal won the French Open, Wimbledon, and the US Open, completing his Career Grand Slam. Nadal was only the seventh man to do so in the sport's history. Nadal was the thirteenth tennis player to win the Overseas Sports Personality, the last being three-time winner Roger Federer.

Michael Johnson presented the award.

=== Coach of the Year ===
The BBC Sports Personality of the Year Coach Award had three nominees. Montgomerie was the first golfer to take the award home.

Winner and Nominees of the 2010 BBC Sports Personality of the Year Coach Award
Nominee	Sport	2010 Achievement
Colin Montgomerie	Golf	As captain, Montgomerie masterminded Europe's victory over the USA in the Ryder Cup.
Andy Flower	Cricket	Coached England to victory at the ICC World Twenty20 competition.
Ian Holloway	Football	Guided Blackpool F.C. to the Premier League, ending the club's forty year absence from the top-flight.

=== Lifetime Achievement Award ===
The Lifetime Achievement Award was given to footballer David Beckham. The award was given for Beckham's playing career, which includes being England's most-capped outfield player, winning six Premier Leagues, and playing across the world. It also recognised Beckham's roles in the London 2012 Olympics bid, and in the attempt to bring the 2018 World Cup to England. Beckham had won the main award back in 2001.

Bobby Charlton presented the award to Beckham, who received a standing ovation from the audience.

== In Memoriam ==
- Andy Holmes
- Andy Ripley
- Terry Newton
- Bobby Smith
- Dick Francis
- Malcolm Allison
- Alec Bedser
- Gil Merrick
- Shoya Tomizawa
- Tom Walkinshaw
- Nodar Kumaritashvili
- Laurent Fignon
- Greville Starkey
- Ronnie Clayton
- Garry Purdham
- Alex Higgins
- Paddy Mullins
- Keith Alexander
- Ralph Coates
- Dale Roberts
- Adam Stansfield
- Juan Antonio Samaranch
- Wilf Paish
- Harry Carpenter
- Bill McLaren
