= 2017 BBC Sports Personality of the Year Award =

Sports award in the UK

- Date: 17 December 2017
- Location: Echo Arena, Liverpool
- Country: United Kingdom
- Presented by: British Broadcasting Corporation (BBC)
- Hosted by: Gary Lineker; Clare Balding; Gabby Logan
- Winner: Mo Farah
- Website: www.bbc.co.uk/sport/sports-personality

Television/radio coverage
- Network: BBC One; BBC One HD; BBC Radio 5 Live
- Runtime: 135 minutes

The 2017 BBC Sports Personality of the Year Award took place on 17 December 2017 at the Echo Arena in Liverpool. It was the 64th presentation of the BBC Sports Personality of the Year Award. Awarded annually by the British Broadcasting Corporation (BBC), the main award honours an individual's British sporting achievement over the past year, with the winner selected by public vote from a twelve-person shortlist.

The event, broadcast live on BBC One, was hosted by Gary Lineker, Clare Balding and Gabby Logan.

Noel Gallagher's High Flying Birds opened the ceremony and later performed a cover of "All You Need Is Love" to celebrate camaraderie in sport during 2017. Rebecca Ferguson sang "Halo" in honour of Jessica Ennis-Hill and Rag'n'Bone Man performed Grace during the in memoriam.

== Nominees ==
The nominees for the award were revealed by Gabby Logan on 27 November 2017, during BBC One's The One Show.

Nominee	Sport	2017 Achievement	BBC profile	Votes (percentage)
Sir Mo Farah	Athletics	Won his third consecutive 10,000 metres gold at the IAAF World Championships, along with 5000 metres silver. He is the first athlete to win ten global outdoor long-distance titles on the track and the first Briton to win outdoor titles in four World Championships (both consecutively and outright).		83,524 (15.32%)
Jonathan Rea	Motorcycling	Won the Superbike World Championship for the third time, making him just the third rider to do so (and the first to achieve a consecutive hat-trick). Also broke the record for most points scored in a season (previously held by Colin Edwards).		80,567 (14.78%)
Jonnie Peacock	Athletics	Won his second T44 100 metres gold at the World Para Athletics Championships.		73,429 (13.47%)
Anthony Joshua	Boxing	Added the previously vacant WBA (Super) heavyweight belt to his IBF belt upon defeating Wladimir Klitschko, then retained both upon defeating Carlos Takam.		73,411 (13.47%)
Adam Peaty	Swimming	Successfully defended his 50 and 100 metres breaststroke titles at the FINA World Championships and twice broke his own 50m world record en route, making him the first Briton to win four individual world titles. Also helped secure silver in the 4 x 100 metres medley relay.		63,739 (11.69%)
Lewis Hamilton	Formula 1	Won the World Drivers' Championship for the fourth time, making him the first Briton (and fifth driver overall) to do so. Also succeeded Michael Schumacher as pole position record holder.		60,627 (11.12%)
Chris Froome	Cycling	Won the Tour de France for the fourth time (and third in succession), then went on to win the Vuelta a España. He is the first cyclist to win two Grand Tours within a season since Alberto Contador in 2008, as well as the first Briton to claim either achievement. Also won time trial bronze at the UCI Road World Championships.		47,683 (8.75%)
Harry Kane	Football	Became the Premier League's top scorer for a second consecutive season and as England captain helped secure qualification for the FIFA World Cup.		18,759 (3.44%)
Anya Shrubsole	Cricket	Part of the English squad that won the Women's Cricket World Cup. Produced World Cup final-best bowling figures of 6-46 (including a 19-delivery 5-11 spell) that were instrumental to the match outcome and was consequently named player of the match.		15,237 (2.80%)
Bianca Walkden	Taekwondo	Became the first Briton to successfully defend a world title upon winning heavyweight gold at the World Taekwondo Championships.		13,962 (2.56%)
Johanna Konta	Tennis	Became the first British woman to contest the Wimbledon singles semi-finals since Virginia Wade in 1978, as well as the first to win a Premier Mandatory title (Miami Open).		7,591 (1.39%)
Elise Christie	Speed skating	Became the first ever female British world champion upon winning overall, 1000 and 1500 metres gold at the ISU World Short Track Championships, as well as 3000 metres bronze.		6,504 (1.19%)

== Controversy ==
=== Paradise Papers ===
In November 2017, Hamilton was named in the Paradise Papers. It was reported that Hamilton had avoided paying £3.3 million of Value Added Tax on his private jet worth £16.5 million. The leasing deal set up by advisers was said by the BBC to appear to be artificial and not to comply with an EU and UK ban on refunds for private use. Host of the BBC Sports Personality of the year Gary Lineker was also named in the Paradise Papers in November 2017.

=== Asthma medication ===
On 13 December 2017, the UCI announced that Froome had returned an "Adverse Analytical Finding" for twice his allowed dose of Salbutamol, a medication against asthma. Both the A and B samples proved positive. The test was taken after stage 18 of the Vuelta a España. In a statement, Froome commented: "My asthma got worse at the Vuelta so I followed the team doctor's advice to increase my Salbutamol dosage. As always, I took the greatest care to ensure that I did not use more than the permissible dose." Froome later reiterated these comments during the ceremony.

The UCI officially closed the investigation on 2 July 2018, stating that Froome had supplied sufficient evidence to suggest that his "sample results do not constitute an AAF".

== Other awards ==
In addition to the main award as "Sports Personality of the Year", several other awards will also be presented:

- Overseas Personality: Roger Federer was announced as the winner for the fourth time
- Team of the Year: England Women's Cricket Team
- Lifetime Achievement: Jessica Ennis-Hill
- Coach of the Year: Benke Blomkvist, Stephen Maguire and Christian Malcolm
- Helen Rollason Award: Bradley Lowery
- Young Personality: Phil Foden
- Unsung Hero Award: Denise Larrad

== In Memoriam ==
- Graham Taylor
- Ugo Ehiogu
- Germaine Mason Derek Ibbotson
- Janette Brittin Megan Lowe
- Sharon Laws
- Peter Walwyn Mary Reveley Geoff Wragg
- Tim Gudgin
- Arthur Bunting Colin Hutton
- David Parry-Jones Kevin Cadle Ralph Dellor
- John Hampshire Peter Richardson Doug Insole
- Rachael Heyhoe-Flint
- Jana Novotna
- Roger Becker Alan Little
- Mike Smith Betty Cuthbert Philippa Roles
- Cheick Tiote Freddy Shepherd
- Elli Norkett John Gwilliam
- Dermot Drummy Tommy Gemmell
- Roger Self Dame Di Ellis
- John Jacobs Roberto De Vicenzo
- Jamie Hodson Gavin Lupton Mark Fincham
- Jim Munkley Claire Robertson
- Mick Adams Tom van Vollenhoven
- Caroline Facer Jamie MacDonald
- Colin Meads Dan Vickerman John Graham
- Joost van der Westhuizen
- Ronnie Moran Alex Young
- Ryan McBride Izzy Dezu Billy Simpson
- Michele Scarponi Mike Hall Stephen Wooldridge
- Tommy Carberry John Buckingham Brian Fletcher
- Errol Christie Jake LaMotta Terry Downes
- Daniel Hegarty Nicky Hayden
- John Surtees
