= BBC Sports Personality of the Year Award =

Award for athletes, presented by BBC

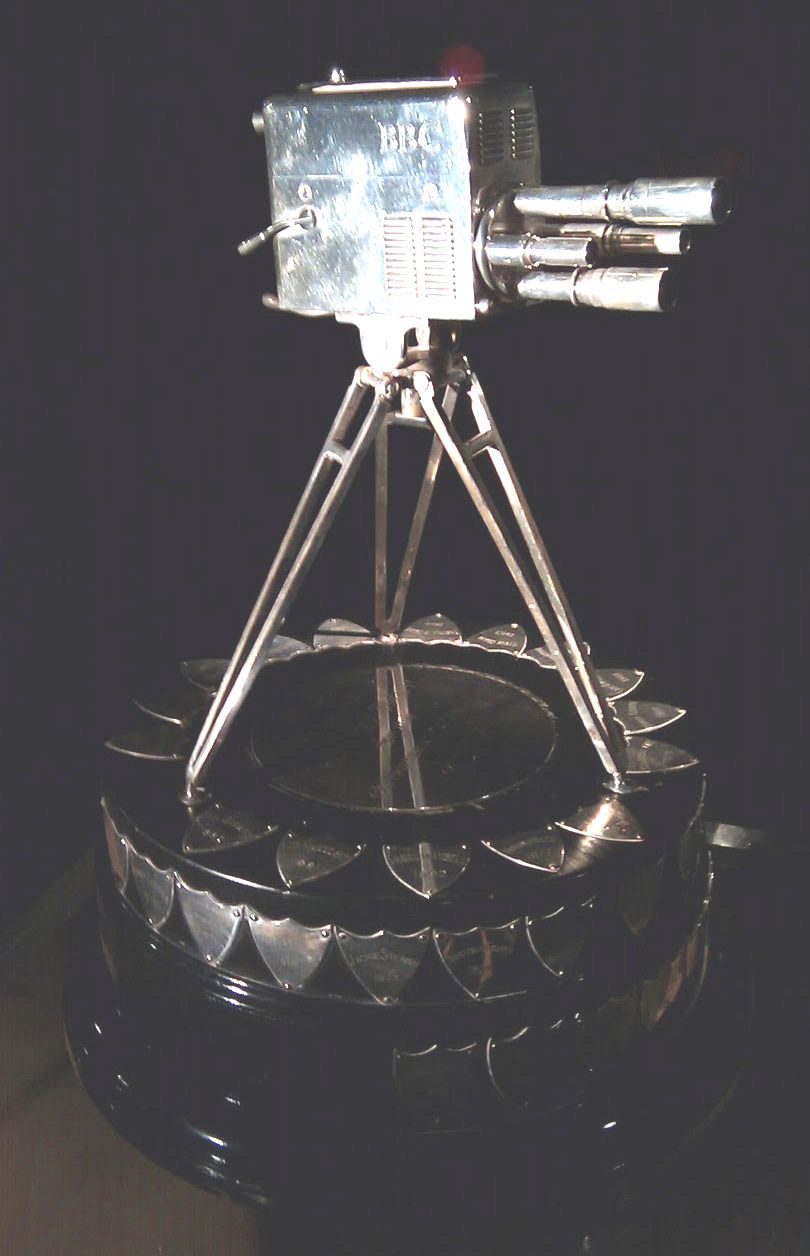
- Awarded for: Excellence in sporting achievement
- Country: United Kingdom
- Presented by: BBC Sport
- Formerly called: Sportsview Personality of the Year
- First award: 30 December 1954; 71 years ago
- Most recent winner: Rory McIlroy (2025; Golf)
- Website: Official website

The BBC Sports Personality of the Year Award is the main award of the BBC Sports Personality of the Year ceremony, which takes place each December. The winner is the sportsperson, judged by a public vote, to have achieved the most that year. The recipient must either be British or reside and play a significant amount of their sport in the United Kingdom. The winner is selected from a predetermined shortlist. The most recent award-winner is golfer Rory McIlroy, who won the 2025 award.

== History ==
Sports Personality of the Year was created by Paul Fox, who thought of the idea while he was editor of the magazine show Sportsview. The first award ceremony took place in 1954 as part of Sportsview, and was presented by Peter Dimmock. For the first show, votes were sent by postcard, and rules presented in a Radio Times article stipulated that nominations were restricted to athletes who had featured on the Sportsview programme since April. Approximately 14,500 votes were cast, and Christopher Chataway beat Roger Bannister to win the inaugural BBC Sportsview's Personality of the Year Award.

== Nomination procedure ==
The shortlist is announced a few weeks before the award ceremony, and the winner is determined on the night by a public telephone and on-line vote. Prior to 2012, a panel of 30 sports journalists each submitted a list of 10 contenders. From these contenders a shortlist of ten nominees was determined. This method was criticized following the selection of an all-male shortlist in 2011. The selection process for contenders was changed for the 2012 and subsequent awards by the introduction of an expert panel. The panel produces a shortlist that reflects UK sporting achievements on the national and/or international stage, represents the breadth and depth of UK sports and takes into account 'impact' within and beyond the sport or sporting achievement in question.

== Winners ==
Five people have won the award more than once: tennis player Andy Murray is the only person to have won three times and the only person to have won in consecutive years, while boxer Henry Cooper and Formula One drivers Nigel Mansell, Lewis Hamilton and Damon Hill have each won twice.

Princess Anne (1971) and her daughter Zara Phillips (2006) are the only award-winners to be members of the same family. The oldest recipient of the award is Dai Rees, who won in 1957 aged 44. Ian Black, who won the following year, aged 17, is the youngest winner. Torvill and Dean, who won in 1984, are the only non-individual winners of the award, so in the 66 years of the award there have been 67 recipients; of these 14 have been female. 17 sporting disciplines have been represented; athletics has the highest representation, with 17 recipients. Counting Torvill and Dean separately, there have been 48 English winners of the award, six Scottish, five Welsh, three Northern Irish, and one Manx.

=== Awards by year ===
BBC Sports Personality of the Year Award winners
Edition	Year	Winner	Sport	Second	Sport	Third	Sport	Ref.
1st	1954	Christopher Chataway (ENG)	Athletics	Roger Bannister (ENG)	Athletics	Pat Smythe (ENG)	Show jumping	
2nd	1955	Gordon Pirie (ENG)	Athletics	No record	—N/a	No record	—N/a	
3rd	1956	Jim Laker (ENG)	Cricket	No record	—N/a	No record	—N/a	
4th	1957	Dai Rees (WAL)	Golf	Stirling Moss (ENG)	Formula One	Derek Ibbotson (ENG)	Athletics	
5th	1958	Ian Black (SCO)	Swimming	Bobby Charlton (ENG)	Football	Nat Lofthouse (ENG)	Football	
6th	1959	John Surtees (ENG)	Motorcycle racing	Bobby Charlton (ENG)	Football	Ian Black (SCO)	Swimming	
7th	1960	David Broome (WAL)	Show jumping	Don Thompson (ENG)	Athletics	Anita Lonsbrough (ENG)	Swimming	
8th	1961	Stirling Moss (ENG)	Formula One	Billy Walker (ENG)	Boxing	Angela Mortimer (ENG)	Tennis	
9th	1962	Anita Lonsbrough (ENG)	Swimming	Dorothy Hyman (ENG)	Athletics	Linda Ludgrove (ENG)	Swimming	
10th	1963	Dorothy Hyman (ENG)	Athletics	Bobby McGregor (SCO)	Swimming	Jim Clark (SCO)	Formula One	
11th	1964	Mary Rand (ENG)	Athletics	Barry Briggs (NZL)	Speedway	Ann Packer (ENG)	Athletics	
12th	1965	Tom Simpson (ENG)	Cycling	Jim Clark (SCO)	Formula One	Marion Coakes (ENG)	Show jumping	
13th	1966	Bobby Moore (ENG)	Football	Barry Briggs (NZL)	Speedway	Geoff Hurst (ENG)	Football	
14th	1967	Henry Cooper (ENG)	Boxing	Beryl Burton (ENG)	Cycling	Harvey Smith (ENG)	Show jumping	
15th	1968	David Hemery (ENG)	Athletics	Graham Hill (ENG)	Formula One	Marion Coakes (ENG)	Show jumping	
16th	1969	Ann Jones (ENG)	Tennis	Tony Jacklin (ENG)	Golf	George Best (NIR)	Football	
17th	1970	Henry Cooper (ENG)	Boxing	Tony Jacklin (ENG)	Golf	Bobby Moore (ENG)	Football	
18th	1971	Princess Anne (ENG)	Eventing	George Best (NIR)	Football	Barry John (WAL)	Rugby union	
19th	1972	Mary Peters (NIR)	Athletics	Gordon Banks (ENG)	Football	Richard Meade (WAL)	Eventing	
20th	1973	Jackie Stewart (SCO)	Formula One	Roger Taylor (ENG)	Tennis	Paddy McMahon (ENG)	Show jumping	
21st	1974	Brendan Foster (ENG)	Athletics	John Conteh (ENG)	Boxing	Willie John McBride (NIR)	Rugby union	
22nd	1975	David Steele (ENG)	Cricket	Alan Pascoe (ENG)	Athletics	David Wilkie (SCO)	Swimming	
23rd	1976	John Curry (ENG)	Figure skating	James Hunt (ENG)	Formula One	David Wilkie (SCO)	Swimming	
24th	1977	Virginia Wade (ENG)	Tennis	Geoffrey Boycott (ENG)	Cricket	Barry Sheene (ENG)	Motorcycle racing	
25th	1978	Steve Ovett (ENG)	Athletics	Daley Thompson (ENG)	Athletics	Ian Botham (ENG)	Cricket	
26th	1979	Sebastian Coe (ENG)	Athletics	Ian Botham (ENG)	Cricket	Kevin Keegan (ENG)	Football	
27th	1980	Robin Cousins (ENG)	Figure skating	Sebastian Coe (ENG)	Athletics	Daley Thompson (ENG)	Athletics	
28th	1981	Ian Botham (ENG)	Cricket	Steve Davis (ENG)	Snooker	Sebastian Coe (ENG)	Athletics	
29th	1982	Daley Thompson (ENG)	Athletics	Alex Higgins (NIR)	Snooker	Steve Cram (ENG)	Athletics	
30th	1983	Steve Cram (ENG)	Athletics	Jayne Torvill and Christopher Dean (Note: Torvill and Dean are the figure skating pair Jayne Torvill and Christopher Dean. For the summary tables they are treated as one winner of the award.) (ENG)	Figure skating	Daley Thompson (ENG)	Athletics	
31st	1984	Jayne Torvill and Christopher Dean (ENG)	Figure skating	Sebastian Coe (ENG)	Athletics	Steve Davis (ENG)	Snooker	
32nd	1985	Barry McGuigan (NIR)	Boxing	Ian Botham (ENG)	Cricket	Steve Cram (ENG)	Athletics	
33rd	1986	Nigel Mansell (ENG)	Formula One	Fatima Whitbread (ENG)	Athletics	Kenny Dalglish (SCO)	Football	
34th	1987	Fatima Whitbread (ENG)	Athletics	Steve Davis (ENG)	Snooker	Ian Woosnam (WAL)	Golf	
35th	1988	Steve Davis (ENG)	Snooker	Adrian Moorhouse (ENG)	Swimming	Sandy Lyle (SCO)	Golf	
36th	1989	Nick Faldo (ENG)	Golf	Frank Bruno (ENG)	Boxing	Steve Davis (ENG)	Snooker	
37th	1990	Paul Gascoigne (ENG)	Football	Stephen Hendry (SCO)	Snooker	Graham Gooch (ENG)	Cricket	
38th	1991 (Note: In 1991 Bob Nudd received the most votes—more than 100,000—following a campaign in the Angling Times. However the BBC deemed an organised vote to be against the rules.)	Liz McColgan (SCO)	Athletics	Will Carling (ENG)	Rugby union	Gary Lineker (ENG)	Football	
39th	1992	Nigel Mansell (ENG)	Formula One	Linford Christie (ENG)	Athletics	Sally Gunnell (ENG)	Athletics	
40th	1993	Linford Christie (ENG)	Athletics	Sally Gunnell (ENG)	Athletics	Nigel Mansell (ENG)	CART	
41st	1994	Damon Hill (ENG)	Formula One	Sally Gunnell (ENG)	Athletics	Colin Jackson (WAL)	Athletics	
42nd	1995	Jonathan Edwards (ENG)	Athletics	Frank Bruno (ENG)	Boxing	Colin McRae (SCO)	Rallying	
43rd	1996 (Note: In 1996, Justin Fashanu received a large number of votes following a campaign in Gay Times. However the BBC deemed this to be against the rules and disqualified him from the award.)	Damon Hill (ENG)	Formula One	Steve Redgrave (ENG)	Rowing	Frankie Dettori (ITA)	Horse racing	
44th	1997	Greg Rusedski (ENG)	Tennis	Tim Henman (ENG)	Tennis	Steve Redgrave (ENG)	Rowing	
45th	1998	Michael Owen (ENG)	Football	Denise Lewis (ENG)	Athletics	Iwan Thomas (WAL)	Athletics	
46th	1999	Lennox Lewis (ENG)	Boxing	David Beckham (ENG)	Football	Colin Jackson (WAL)	Athletics	
47th	2000	Steve Redgrave (ENG)	Rowing	Denise Lewis (ENG)	Athletics	Tanni Grey-Thompson (WAL)	Athletics	
48th	2001	David Beckham (ENG)	Football	Ellen MacArthur (ENG)	Sailing	Michael Owen (ENG)	Football	
49th	2002	Paula Radcliffe (ENG)	Athletics	David Beckham (ENG)	Football	Tony McCoy (NIR)	Horse racing	
50th	2003	Jonny Wilkinson (ENG)	Rugby union	Martin Johnson (ENG)	Rugby union	Paula Radcliffe (ENG)	Athletics	
51st	2004	Kelly Holmes (ENG)	Athletics	Matthew Pinsent (ENG)	Rowing	Andrew Flintoff (ENG)	Cricket	
52nd	2005	Andrew Flintoff (ENG)	Cricket	Ellen MacArthur (ENG)	Sailing	Steven Gerrard (ENG)	Football	
53rd	2006	Zara Phillips (ENG)	Eventing	Darren Clarke (NIR)	Golf	Beth Tweddle (ENG)	Gymnastics	
54th	2007	Joe Calzaghe (WAL)	Boxing	Lewis Hamilton (ENG)	Formula One	Ricky Hatton (ENG)	Boxing	
55th	2008	Chris Hoy (SCO)	Cycling	Lewis Hamilton (ENG)	Formula One	Rebecca Adlington (ENG)	Swimming	
56th	2009	Ryan Giggs (WAL)	Football	Jenson Button (ENG)	Formula One	Jessica Ennis (ENG)	Athletics	
57th	2010	Tony McCoy (NIR)	Horse racing	Phil Taylor (ENG)	Darts	Jessica Ennis (ENG)	Athletics	
58th	2011	Mark Cavendish (IOM)	Cycling	Darren Clarke (NIR)	Golf	Mo Farah (ENG)	Athletics	
59th	2012	Bradley Wiggins (ENG)	Cycling	Jessica Ennis (ENG)	Athletics	Andy Murray (SCO)	Tennis	
60th	2013	Andy Murray (SCO)	Tennis	Leigh Halfpenny (WAL)	Rugby union	Tony McCoy (NIR)	Horse racing	
61st	2014	Lewis Hamilton (ENG)	Formula One	Rory McIlroy (NIR)	Golf	Jo Pavey (ENG)	Athletics	
62nd	2015	Andy Murray (SCO)	Tennis	Kevin Sinfield (ENG)	Rugby league	Jessica Ennis-Hill (ENG)	Athletics	
63rd	2016	Andy Murray (SCO)	Tennis	Alistair Brownlee (ENG)	Triathlon	Nick Skelton (ENG)	Show jumping	
64th	2017	Mo Farah (ENG)	Athletics	Jonathan Rea (NIR)	Motorcycle racing	Jonnie Peacock (ENG)	Athletics	
65th	2018	Geraint Thomas (WAL)	Cycling	Lewis Hamilton (ENG)	Formula One	Harry Kane (ENG)	Football	
66th	2019	Ben Stokes (ENG)	Cricket	Lewis Hamilton (ENG)	Formula One	Dina Asher-Smith (ENG)	Athletics	
67th	2020	Lewis Hamilton (ENG)	Formula One	Jordan Henderson (ENG)	Football	Hollie Doyle (ENG)	Horse racing	
68th	2021	Emma Raducanu (ENG)	Tennis	Tom Daley (ENG)	Diving	Adam Peaty (ENG)	Swimming	
69th	2022	Beth Mead (ENG)	Football	Ben Stokes (ENG)	Cricket	Eve Muirhead (SCO)	Curling	
70th	2023	Mary Earps (ENG)	Football	Stuart Broad (ENG)	Cricket	Katarina Johnson-Thompson (ENG)	Athletics	
71st	2024	Keely Hodgkinson (ENG)	Athletics	Luke Littler (ENG)	Darts	Joe Root (ENG)	Cricket	
72nd	2025	Rory McIlroy (NIR)	Golf	Ellie Kildunne (ENG)	Rugby Union	Lando Norris (ENG)	Formula One	
73rd	2026	TBA	TBA	TBA	TBA	TBA	TBA	

=== By sport ===
This table lists the total number of awards won by the winner's sport.

Accurate up to and including the 2025 award.

Winners by sport
Sport	First place(s)	Second place(s)	Third place(s)	Total placing(s)
Athletics	19	14	21	54
Formula One	8	9	2	19
Football	7	7	10	24
Tennis	7	2	2	11
Cricket	5	5	4	14
Boxing	5	4	1	10
Cycling	5	1	0	6
Golf	3	5	2	10
Figure skating	3	1	0	4
Swimming	2	2	7	11
Eventing	2	0	1	3
Snooker	1	4	2	7
Rugby union	1	4	2	7
Rowing	1	2	1	4
Motorcycle racing	1	1	1	3
Show jumping	1	0	6	7
Horse racing	1	0	4	5
Sailing	0	2	0	2
Darts	0	2	0	2
Speedway	0	2	0	2
Diving	0	1	0	1
Rugby league	0	1	0	1
Triathlon	0	1	0	1
CART	0	0	1	1
Curling	0	0	1	1
Gymnastics	0	0	1	1
Rallying	0	0	1	1
Total	71	69	69	209

=== By number of awards ===
The below table lists all people who have finished in the top three places more than once.

Recipient	First place(s)	Second place(s)	Third place(s)	Total placings(s)
Andy Murray	3	0	1	4
Lewis Hamilton	2	4	0	6
Nigel Mansell	2	0	1	3
Henry Cooper	2	0	0	2
Damon Hill	2	0	0	2
Steve Davis	1	2	2	5
Ian Botham	1	2	1	4
Sebastian Coe	1	2	1	4
David Beckham	1	2	0	3
Daley Thompson	1	1	2	4
Steve Redgrave	1	1	1	3
Linford Christie	1	1	0	2
Dorothy Hyman	1	1	0	2
Stirling Moss	1	1	0	2
Ben Stokes	1	1	0	2
Torvill and Dean	1	1	0	2
Fatima Whitbread	1	1	0	2
Rory McIlroy	1	1	0	2
Steve Cram	1	0	2	3
Tony McCoy	1	0	2	3
Ian Black	1	0	1	2
Mo Farah	1	0	1	2
Andrew Flintoff	1	0	1	2
Anita Lonsbrough	1	0	1	2
Bobby Moore	1	0	1	2
Michael Owen	1	0	1	2
Paula Radcliffe	1	0	1	2
Sally Gunnell	0	2	1	3
Barry Briggs	0	2	0	2
Frank Bruno	0	2	0	2
Darren Clarke	0	2	0	2
Bobby Charlton	0	2	0	2
Tony Jacklin	0	2	0	2
Denise Lewis	0	2	0	2
Ellen MacArthur	0	2	0	2
Jessica Ennis-Hill	0	1	3	4
George Best	0	1	1	2
Jim Clark	0	1	1	2
Marion Coakes	0	0	2	2
Colin Jackson	0	0	2	2
David Wilkie	0	0	2	2

=== By gender ===
This table lists the total number of awards won by the winner's gender. The figure-skating couple Jayne Torvill and Christopher Dean are counted as a single mixed-gender winner.

Accurate up-to and including the 2025 award.

Winners by gender
Gender	First place(s)	Second place(s)	Third place(s)	Total placing(s)
Male	55	58	50	163
Female	16	11	20	47
Mixed	1	1	0	2
Total	72	70	70	212

== See also ==
- History of BBC Sports Personality of the Year
