= 2013 BBC Sports Personality of the Year Award =

Sports award in the UK

- Date: 15 December 2013
- Location: First Direct Arena, Leeds
- Country: United Kingdom
- Presented by: British Broadcasting Corporation (BBC)
- Hosted by: Gary Lineker; Clare Balding; Gabby Logan
- Winner: Andy Murray
- Website: www.bbc.co.uk/sport/sports-personality/2013

Television/radio coverage
- Network: BBC One; BBC One HD
- Runtime: 140 minutes

The 2013 BBC Sports Personality of the Year Award was presented on 15 December from the First Direct Arena in Leeds. It was the 60th presentation of the BBC Sports Personality of the Year Award. Awarded annually by the British Broadcasting Corporation (BBC), the main titular award honours an individual's British sporting achievement over the past year, with the winner selected by public vote from a ten-person shortlist.

The event was presented by Gary Lineker, Clare Balding and Gabby Logan with musical performances from John Newman and Russell Watson. Sue Barker decided to step down as a presenter after 19 years.

The winner of the main award was tennis player Andy Murray. Former Manchester United manager, Sir Alex Ferguson won the special BBC Sports Personality Diamond Award.

== Basis of nominations ==
Prior to 2012, a panel of thirty sports journalists each submit a list of ten contenders. From these contenders a shortlist of ten nominees is determined—currently, in the event of a tie at the end of the nomination process, a panel of six former award winners determined the nominee by a Borda count. The shortlist was announced at the beginning of December, and the winner was determined on the night of the ceremony by a public telephone vote.

In 2011 the shortlist produced only contained male competitors, which caused media uproar. The selection process for contenders was changed for the 2012 (and future) awards as follows:

The BBC introduced an expert panel who were asked to devise a shortlist that reflected UK sporting achievements on the national and/or international stage, represented the breadth and depth of UK sports and took into account "impact" within and beyond the sport or sporting achievement in question.

== Nominees ==
The nominees for the 2013 award and their share of the votes cast were as follows:

Nominee	Sport	2013 achievement	BBC Profile	Votes (percentage)
Andy Murray	Tennis	Became the first British man in the Open Era to win a singles title at Wimbledon (and the first outright since Fred Perry 77 years prior).		401,470 (55.96%)
Leigh Halfpenny	Rugby union	Designated man-of-the-series in the victorious Lions tour of Australia (their first series victory in 16 years) and player of the tournament in the Six Nations.		65,913 (9.19%)
AP McCoy	Horse racing	Became the first jump jockey to ride 4,000 winners.		57,854 (8.06%)
Mo Farah	Athletics	Won the 5,000m and 10,000m events at the IAAF World Championships, thus becoming the first Briton to successfully defend a world title and win three. Also broke the European record in the 1,500m.		51,945 (7.24%)
Sir Ben Ainslie	Sailing	Helped mastermind an unlikely victory for Oracle Team USA (winning 9–8 after being 1–8 down) in the America's Cup.		48,140 (6.71%)
Chris Froome	Cycling	Won the 100th edition of the Tour de France, as well as two other races on the World Tour.		37,343 (5.20%)
Hannah Cockroft	Athletics	Won the T34 sprint double (100 / 200 metres) at the IPC World Championships for the second time in succession.		26,151 (3.64%)
Christine Ohuruogu	Athletics	Won the 400m at the IAAF World Championships for the second time and concurrently broke the British record set by Kathy Smallwood-Cook 29 years prior. Also became the first British woman to win two outdoor world titles.		13,179 (1.84%)
Justin Rose	Golf	Won the U.S. Open, thus becoming the first Englishman to win a major since Nick Faldo 17 years prior.		9,833 (1.37%)
Ian Bell	Cricket	A key figure in England's 3–0 defeat of Australia in the Ashes series. His tally of 562 equalled the English record for the most runs scored in a five-match home Ashes.		5,626 (0.78%)

== Other awards ==
In addition to the main award as "Sports Personality of the Year", several other awards were also announced:

- Overseas Personality: Sebastian Vettel
- Team of the Year: 2013 British & Irish Lions squad
- BBC Diamond Award: Sir Alex Ferguson
- Coach of the Year: Warren Gatland
- Helen Rollason Award: Anne Williams
- Young Personality: Amber Hill
- Unsung Hero Award: Joe and Maggie Forber

== In Memoriam ==
- Acer Nethercott
- Christian Benitez
- Jean Pickering
- Bert Trautmann
- Todd Bennett
- Andrew Simpson
- Tony Gubba
- Graham Murray
- Reg Simpson
- Tony Greig
- Bill Foulkes
- Emmanuel McDonald Bailey
- Jo Pitt
- Bill Hoskyns
- Ron Davies
- Martin Richard Krystle Campbell Lu Lingzi
- Maria De Villota
- Dave Hickson
- Ken Norton
- Cliff Morgan
- Mike Denness
- Helen Elliot
- Dean Powell
- David Oates
- Sean Edwards
- Henry Cecil
- Tommy Morrison
- Brian Greenhoff
- Donna Hartley-Wass
- Christopher Martin-Jenkins
- Dave Thomas
- Phill Nixon
- Steve Prescott
