= 2008 BBC Sports Personality of the Year Award =

Sports award in the UK

- Date: 14 December 2008
- Location: Echo Arena, Liverpool
- Country: United Kingdom
- Presented by: BBC
- Hosted by: Sue Barker; Jake Humphrey; Gary Lineker
- Winner: Chris Hoy
- Website: BBC Sports Personality

Television/radio coverage
- Network: BBC One
- Runtime: 125 minutes

The 2008 BBC Sports Personality of the Year Award, held on 14 December at the Echo Arena in Liverpool, was the 55th presentation of the BBC Sports Personality of the Year Awards. Presented by Sue Barker, Gary Lineker, and, for the first time, Jake Humphrey, the show was broadcast on BBC One. Awarded annually by the BBC, the main titular award honours an individual's British sporting achievement over the past year. The winner was selected by public vote from a 10-person shortlist. Other awards presented include team, coach, and young personality of the year.

Chris Hoy took home the top award of the night, with Lewis Hamilton in second place, and Rebecca Adlington in third.

== Location and presenters ==
In February 2008, the BBC announced that year's Awards would be held in Liverpool's Echo Arena on Sunday 14th December that year. The move from Birmingham's National Exhibition Centre would allow more people to attend the event, the BBC said. The move also coincided with Liverpool becoming the European Capital of Culture.

Sue Barker, who had presented the awards since 1994, returned, as did Gary Lineker to present his ninth edition of the awards. They were joined by Jake Humphrey, who replaced Adrian Chiles as the third presenter. Humphrey had covered the 2008 Beijing Olympics for the BBC, as well as presenting football and American Football for the corporation.

== Winner and nominees ==
The ten nominees featured four from the world of cycling, and one each from athletics, boxing, Formula One, sailing, swimming, and tennis.

Chris Hoy was named the winner at the climax of the show, with 29.48% of the public vote. Lewis Hamilton was the runner-up with 22.81% of the vote, followed by Rebecca Adlington with 20.31% of the vote. Hoy became the second cyclist to win the award, after Tom Simpson won in 1965. Cyclist Beryl Burton was the runner-up in 1967. Hoy was also the fourth Scottish person to win the award, after Ian Black, Jackie Stewart, and Liz McColgan. The last Scottish person to reach the top three was Colin McRae in 1995. Hamilton had finished second in the previous year, whilst Adlington was the first swimmer since Adrian Moorhouse in 1988 to reach the top three.

Hoy was presented the trophy by Steve Redgrave and Michael Johnson.

Winner and nominees of the 2008 BBC Sports Personality of the Year Award
Nominee	Sport	2009 achievement	Votes	%
Chris Hoy	Cycling	Became the first Briton to win three Olympic Gold medals in a single games since 1908. The three golds came in the sprint, the team sprint, and the keirin. Also won the sprint and the keirin at the 2008 UCI Track Cycling World Championships in Manchester.	283,630	39.48
Lewis Hamilton	Formula One	After finishing as runner-up in the 2007 Formula One World Championship, Hamilton did one better in 2008, where he won the title dramatically in the last race of the season. Hamilton became the youngest World Champion in Formula One history, and the first Briton in over a decade.	163,864	22.81
Rebecca Adlington	Swimming	At the Beijing Olympics, Adlington won two golds in the 400m freestyle and 800m freestyle. The second of these titles saw Adlington break the world record. The first British woman to win Olympic swimming gold since 1960, and first Briton in a century to win more than one swimming gold in a single games.	145,924	20.31
Ben Ainslie	Sailing	Won his third Olympic gold in Beijing, with a gold in the Finn class, repeating his win from Athens. Also won the Finn Gold Cup and was named as 2008 World Sailor of the Year.	35,472	4.94
Joe Calzaghe	Boxing	After being crowned Sports Personality of the Year in the previous year, Calzaghe beat Bernard Hopkins and Roy Jones Jr., the latter in a unanimous decision. His record of 46-0 means he remained undefeated in his career.	34,077	4.74
Andy Murray	Tennis	Ending the year ranked fourth in the world, Murray became the first Briton since 1997 to reach a Grand Slam final, with an appearance in the US Open. Murray also won back-to-back Masters series in Cincinnati and Madrid.	19,415	2.70
Nicole Cooke	Cycling	With an Olympic gold in the individual road race, Cooke became the first Welsh woman to win an Olympic gold since 1912. It was also Britain's 200th gold in the Modern Olympic Games. She also became the first cyclist to be Olympic and World Champion in the same year, when she won the road race in Varese.	18,256	2.58
Christine Ohuruogu	Athletics	The reigning World and Commonwealth champion, Ohuruogu added Olympic gold to the list when she won the 400m in Beijing. Ohuruogu was Britain's first female Olympic 400m champion.	7,677	1.09
Bradley Wiggins	Cycling	Wiggins returned to the track to win golds in the team and individual pursuit, bringing his total Olympic medal haul to six medals, a joint record with Steve Redgrave. He also added three more golds to his medal haul at the Track Cycling World Championships.	5,633	0.78
Rebecca Romero	Cycling	Having only started cycling in 2006 after retiring from rowing, Romero became the first Briton to compete at the Olympics in two different sports. She won gold in the individual pursuit, adding two more golds in the Track Cycling World Championships.	4,526	0.63

== Other awards ==
=== Young Sports Personality of the Year ===
The first award of the night, the BBC Young Sports Personality of the Year was presented by Ricky Hatton and former winner Theo Walcott.

The shortlist of three was whittled down from a longlist of ten, which also included canoeist Thomas Brady, taekwondo athlete Aaron Cook, cyclist Sam Harrison, sailor James Peters, motorcyclist Scott Redding, swimmer Lizzie Simmonds, and sprinter Shaunna Thompson. The panel deciding the shortlist was chaired by BBC broadcaster John Inverdale, with presenter Jake Humphrey, former winners Harry Aikines-Aryeetey and Kate Haywood, and representatives from CBBC and the Youth Sports Trust on the panel.

Winner and nominees of the 2008 BBC Young Sports Personality of the Year Award
Nominee	Sport	2008 Achievement
Ellie Simmonds	Swimming	At only thirteen, Simmonds became Britain's youngest ever individual gold medallist when she won gold in 100m and 400m freestyle at the Beijing Paralympics.
Tom Daley	Diving	Daley won gold at the European Aquatics Championships in the 10m platform, becoming the youngest person to win a gold at the event. Daley also competed at the Olympics.
Laura Robson	Tennis	Robson, at fourteen, beat the competition to win the Girls' singles title, the first Briton to win the title since 1984. Robson was also the youngest Briton to join the WTA Tour.

=== Helen Rollason Award ===
The BBC Sports Personality of the Year Helen Rollason Award is given “for outstanding achievement in the face of adversity”. The award was given to Alastair Hignell. He had played rugby union for England and cricket for Gloucestershire before becoming a commentator for the BBC on rugby union. Hignell was diagnosed with multiple sclerosis in 1999 and was heavily involved in fundraising to battle the condition. The award was presented by Clive Woodward, with Lawrence Dallaglio paying tribute on the show.

=== Unsung Hero Award ===
The BBC Sports Unsung Hero Award is given to someone who is unrecognised but gives a valuable contribution to their local community. A winner is chosen by each of the twelve BBC English Regions and three nations - BBC Northern Ireland, BBC Scotland, and BBC Wales. Then the eventual winner is chosen from the fifteen regional winners. The 2008 award was given to Ben Geyser, a seventy year-old boxing coach and fundraiser from Dorchester. Geyser was the BBC South winner and had set up three boxing clubs throughout his career. Phil Neville and Ian Rush presented the award.

=== Lifetime Achievement Award ===
The Lifetime Achievement Award was awarded to Bobby Charlton to recognise his fifty year career in football. Charlton was part of the 1966 World Cup winning squad and led the 1968 Manchester United team to 1968 European Cup glory. He received a standing ovation as he was presented the award by his brother, Jack Charlton.

=== Coach of the Year ===
The BBC Sports Personality of the Year Coach Award had three nominees and was presented by Michael Vaughan and Dame Kelly Holmes.

Winner and Nominees of the 2008 BBC Sports Personality of the Year Coach Award
Nominee	Sport	2008 Achievement
Dave Brailsford	Cycling	Guided the Olympic cycling teamto fourteen medals at the Beijing Olympics, including eight golds. The team also won nine golds at the UCI Track Cycling World Championships.
Alex Ferguson	Football	Led Manchester United to a tenth Premier League title, before beating Chelsea in the final of the Champions League.
Warren Gatland	Rugby Union	Took Wales to their tenth grand slam in the Six Nations. During the successful campaign, Wales won at Twickenham for the first time since 1988.
Harry Redknapp	Football	Guided Portsmouth F.C. to their second FA Cup victory, beating Cardiff City in the final.

=== Team of the Year ===
The BBC Sports Team of the Year Award had four nominees. The award was presented by Alan Hansen and Alan Shearer and was received by Victoria Pendleton.

Winner and Nominees of the 2008 BBC Sports Team of the Year Award
Nominee	Sport	2008 Achievement
Olympic cycling team	Cycling	Won fourteen medals, including eight golds, at the Beijing Olympics.
British Olympic Team	Multi-discipline	Finished the Games fourth in the medal table, with the best Olympics performance for the country in a century.
Manchester United F.C.	Football	Won the Premier League and Champions League in the same season.
Wales Rugby Union Team	Rugby Union	Won the Six Nations Championship with a Grand Slam.

=== Overseas Personality Award ===
The BBC Overseas Sports Personality of the Year Award is given to someone from outside the UK. Three people were nominated for the award, with it being collected over videolink.

Winner and Nominees of the 2008 BBC Overseas Sports Personality of the Year Award
Nation	Nominee	Sport	2008 Achievement
Jamaica	Usain Bolt	Athletics	Won three golds in Beijing in the 100m, 200m and 4 × 100m relay. In the first two Bolt broke the world record.
Ireland	Pádraig Harrington	Golf	Successfully defended his title at the Open Championship and won the PGA Championship, reaching a career high ranking of third in the world.
United States	Michael Phelps	Swimming	Won eight golds at the Olympics to break the all-time record number of gold medals won at a single games. In the process, Phelps broke seven world records.
