= 2016 BBC Sports Personality of the Year Award =

Sports award in the UK

- Date: 18 December 2016
- Location: Genting Arena, Birmingham
- Country: United Kingdom
- Presented by: British Broadcasting Corporation (BBC)
- Hosted by: Gary Lineker; Clare Balding; Gabby Logan
- Winner: Andy Murray
- Website: www.bbc.co.uk/sport/sports-personality

Television/radio coverage
- Network: BBC One; BBC One HD; BBC Radio 5 Live
- Runtime: 140 minutes

The 2016 BBC Sports Personality of the Year Award took place on 18 December 2016 at the Genting Arena in Birmingham. It was the 63rd presentation of the BBC Sports Personality of the Year Award. Awarded annually by the British Broadcasting Corporation (BBC), the main award honours an individual's British sporting achievement over the past year, with the winner selected by public vote from a sixteen-person shortlist. The winner was Tennis player Andy Murray, who became the first person to win the award three times. The event, broadcast live on BBC One, was hosted by Gary Lineker, Clare Balding and Gabby Logan.

== Nominees ==
The nominees were revealed on 28 November 2016, during BBC One's The One Show. To reflect the vast success of the past year, a record 16 sportspeople were named on the shortlist.

Nominee	Sport	2016 Achievement	BBC profile	Votes (percentage)
Andy Murray	Tennis	Won his second singles Wimbledon title, reached the singles finals of both the Australian Open and French Open, defended his singles title at the Olympics (the first player ever to do so), won the year-ending World Tour Finals and became the first ever Briton to top the computerised ATP singles rankings.		247,419 (33.1%)
Alistair Brownlee	Triathlon	Won a second successive Olympic title in the men's triathlon, thus becoming the first competitor (man or woman) in Olympic history to defend the triathlon title.		121,665 (16.3%)
Nick Skelton	Equestrian	Won the Olympic individual show jumping competition at the age of 58, thus becoming the oldest champion in Olympic equestrian history and the oldest British Olympic champion in 108 years.		109,197 (14.6%)
Mo Farah	Athletics	Became the first athlete in 40 years to achieve the long distance "double-double" (5,000 / 10,000 metres) at the Olympics. Also became the first athlete to win nine global outdoor long-distance titles on the track, both consecutively and outright.		54,476 (7.3%)
Sophie Christiansen	Equestrian	Won a clean sweep of three gold medals in para-dressage (team championship and championship / freestyle test grade Ia) at the Paralympics, the second successive Games in which she achieved the feat.		37,284 (5.0%)
Kate Richardson-Walsh	Hockey	Captained the Great Britain team to a first ever gold medal in the women's Olympic field hockey tournament, winning every single match.		34,604 (4.6%)
Max Whitlock	Gymnastics	Became the first ever British Olympic champion in gymnastics, winning two gold medals (floor exercise and pommel horse) within two hours, as well as his country's first individual all-around medal (bronze) in 108 years.		32,858 (4.4%)
Laura Kenny	Cycling	Won two Olympic titles in track cycling (team pursuit and omnium, both of which were successful defenses); in doing so, she became the first female British Olympian and only the second female Olympic cyclist (after Leontien van Moorsel) to win four gold medals. Also won scratch and omnium gold at the UCI Track World Championships.		31,781 (4.3%)
Jamie Vardy	Football	Helped Leicester City win the Premier League title, having been given odds of 5,000/1 to do so at the beginning of the season.		25,020 (3.3%)
Jason Kenny	Cycling	Won three Olympic titles in track cycling (team sprint, sprint and keirin; the first two were also successful defenses); in doing so, he matched Sir Chris Hoy's hat-trick from 2008 and his records for the most gold medals (6) won by a British Olympian and an Olympic cyclist. Also won sprint gold at the UCI Track World Championships.		12,376 (1.7%)
Adam Peaty	Swimming	Won the men's 100 metre breaststroke (and set two world records en route) to become Great Britain's first male Olympic swimming champion since Adrian Moorhouse 28 years prior. Also part of the silver medal-winning team in the 4 x 100 metres medley relay event, the country's highest finish in the event.		11,129 (1.5%)
Gareth Bale	Football	Won the Champions League (for a second time) with Real Madrid and was part of the Wales team that reached the semi-finals of Euro 2016.		10,786 (1.4%)
Nicola Adams	Boxing	Successfully defended her flyweight boxing title at the Olympics, thus becoming the first British boxer in 92 years to do so in any division. She also won flyweight gold in the AIBA Women's World Championships and achieved the career 'grand slam' of Olympic, World, European and Commonwealth titles.		7,812 (1.0%)
Kadeena Cox	Athletics/Cycling	Became the first British Paralympian to win medals in two different sports at a single Games in 28 years, with one gold in cycling (C4-5 500m time trial) as well as a medal of each colour (gold, silver and bronze) in athletics (T38 400m, T35-38 4 × 100 m relay and T38 100m respectively).		5,574 (0.7%)
Dame Sarah Storey	Cycling	Successfully defended three Paralympic titles in cycling (C4-5 road race and C5 time trial / individual pursuit) to become the most successful British Paralympian in the modern era, and the most successful British female Paralympian of all time (with a total of 14 gold medals).		3,580 (0.5%)
Danny Willett	Golf	Won the Masters Tournament, thus becoming only the second English golfer (after Nick Faldo) to achieve such a feat.		2,227 (0.3%)

== Other awards ==
In addition to the main award as "Sports Personality of the Year", several other awards were also announced:

- Overseas Personality: Simone Biles
- Team of the Year: Leicester City F.C.
- Lifetime Achievement: Michael Phelps
- Coach of the Year: Claudio Ranieri
- Helen Rollason Award: Ben Smith
- Young Personality: Ellie Robinson
- Unsung Hero Award: Marcellus Baz

== In Memoriam ==
- Johan Cruyff
- Don Howe Gary Sprake Sylvia Gore
- Stacey Burrows Lucy Pygott
- Dr John Aldridge Mitch Fenner
- Roger Millward Mick Sullivan
- Denys Smith Thomas Cusack
- Malachi Mitchell-Thomas Billy Redmayne
- Tony Mottram JJ Warr
- Hannah Francis Karen Lewis-Archer Sarah Young
- Roddy Evans Grahame Hodgson
- Ken Higgs Hanif Mohammad Ruth Prideaux
- Beryl Crockford Ailish Sheehan Sarah Tait
- Gerald Williams Dave Lanning
- Dickie Jeeps Seb Adeniran-Olule
- Anthony Foley
- Arnold Palmer
- Christy O'Connor Jnr Christy O'Connor Snr
- John Disley Dave Cropper Anne Pashley
- Frans ten Bos Alastair Biggar
- Jack Bannister Martin Crowe
- Ronan Costello Harry Jepson
- Pavel Srnicek Cesare Maldini
- Alan Henry Bob Cass
- Dalian Atkinson Phil Gartside
- Walter Swinburn
- Carlos Alberto
- Walter McGowan Mike Towell Freddie Gilroy
- Tony Cozier Bud Collins
- Isabelle Docherty Martin Barker
- Meadowlark Lemon Bill Johnson Bahman Golbarnezhad
- Mark Farren Zoe Tynan
- Victims of the Chapecoense air disaster
