= 2009 BBC Sports Personality of the Year Award =

Sports award in the UK

- Date: 13 December 2009
- Location: Sheffield Arena, Sheffield
- Country: United Kingdom
- Presented by: BBC
- Hosted by: Sue Barker; Jake Humphrey; Gary Lineker
- Winner: Ryan Giggs
- Website: BBC Sports Personality

Television/radio coverage
- Network: BBC One
- Runtime: 125 minutes

The 2009 BBC Sports Personality of the Year Award, held on 13 December, was the 56th presentation of the BBC Sports Personality of the Year Awards. It was presented by Sue Barker, Jake Humphrey, and Gary Lineker on BBC One. Awarded annually by the BBC, the main titular award honours an individual's British sporting achievement over the past year. The winner is selected by public vote from a 10-person shortlist. Other awards presented include team, coach, and young personality of the year.

Footballer Ryan Giggs took home the main award, with racing driver Jenson Button second and heptathlete Jessica Ennis third.

== Winner and nominees ==
The BBC Sports Personality of the Year is an annual sport award ceremony and the 2009 edition was its 56th staging. It occurred on the evening of 13 December, at the Sheffield Arena, Sheffield. For 2009, the BBC moved the awards from the Echo Arena, Liverpool to Sheffield to try to attract more spectators. It was the first time that the programme was held in Yorkshire, which was broadcast live in the United Kingdom on BBC One, the BBC Sport website and BBC Radio 5 Live. Sue Barker, Jake Humphrey and Gary Lineker presented the ceremony on the main stage, whilst Clare Balding, Matt Dawson, John Inverdale and Stephen Parry served as the backstage radio broadcasters.

Nominations for the award were conducted by a panel of 26 sport experts representing magazines and select national and regional newspapers. They were asked to choose ten nominees not in preference but in alphabetical order. Had there have been a tie after the nominating process, the production team would have asked six members of a panel of former winners for their first three preferences in order. There would be three points for first, two for second and one for third. The tied nominee with the highest number of points would subsequently advance to the final ten; had there been a second tie, another vote would be conducted to move the tied participant with the highest number of first places to the shortlist.

The ten nominees were announced on the BBC One programme The One Show on the evening of 30 November. The list was composed of two athletes from the sport of athletics, and one each from the sports of boxing, cricket, cycling, diving, football, Formula One, gymnastics and tennis. Jenson Button, the 2009 Formula One World Champion, was the bookmakers' initial favourite to win the accolade, followed heptathlete world champion Jessica Ennis and cricketer Andrew Strauss. In the week prior to the ceremony, the bookmakers moved footballer Ryan Giggs into contention and made him the more than likely winner during the programme.

Giggs was announced as the winner with 29.40 per cent of the public vote. Button finished runner-up with 18.74 per cent of the public vote and Ennis was third with a 15.58 per cent vote share. Giggs was the first footballer to be voted the recipient of the BBC Sports Personality of the Year award since David Beckham in 2001 and the fifth in history following Michael Owen in 1998, Paul Gascoigne in 1990 and Bobby Moore in 1966. Giggs was also the third Welsh winner of the award, following 2007 winner Joe Calzaghe and David Broome who won in 1960. Chris Hoy and Andrew Flintoff presented Giggs with the silver television camera and tripod trophy.

Winner and nominees of the 2009 BBC Sports Personality of the Year Award
Nominee	Sport	2009 achievement	Votes	%
Ryan Giggs	Football	The 20-year veteran of Manchester United made his 800th appearance, scored his 150th goal and helped the club reach the Champions League final.	151,842	29.40
Jenson Button	Formula One	Won the World Drivers' Championship to become the tenth British Formula One World Champion.	96,770	18.74
Jessica Ennis	Athletics	Won heptathlon gold at the IAAF World Championships in Berlin.	80,469	15.58
Mark Cavendish	Cycling	Claimed 23 professional victories during the season, including 6 and 3 stages of the Tour de France / Giro d'Italia respectively.	55,960	10.84
Beth Tweddle	Gymnastics	Won floor gold at the World Artistic Gymnastics Championships.	38,907	7.53
Tom Daley	Diving	Became the first British world champion (at 15 years of age) upon winning 10 metre platform gold at the FINA World Championships.	36,929	7.13
Andy Murray	Tennis	Won six tennis tournaments in 2009, including the Miami Masters and the Montreal Masters to reach No. 2 in the world rankings.	19,936	3.86
Andrew Strauss	Cricket	Captained the England cricket team to victory over Australia in the 2009 Ashes.	17,237	3.34
David Haye	Boxing	Defeated Nikolai Valuev in a "David vs. Goliath" match in Nuremberg, Germany to become the sixth WBA Heavyweight Champion in history.	13,916	2.69
Phillips Idowu	Athletics	Won Britain's second gold medal of the IAAF World Championships in Berlin in the triple jump.	4,507	0.87

== Other awards ==
=== Helen Rollason Award ===
The BBC Sports Personality of the Year Helen Rollason Award was presented to an individual "for outstanding achievement in the face of adversity." The winner was chosen by BBC Sport with no public vote and the name of the recipient was revealed on the night of the ceremony. Help for Heroes charity fundraiser Major Phil Packer, who raised money through sporting activities, was named the award's winner. Packer was presented with the accolade by Steve Redgrave.

Winner of the 2009 BBC Sport Personality of the Year Helen Rollason Award
Winner	Sport	Rationale	Ref
Major Phil Packer	— (Note: Packer raised money by rowing across the English Channel, completing the London Marathon and climbing.)	for fundraising over £1.2 million for the Help for Heroes charity, despite being paraplegic since sustaining injuries in the Iraq War.	

=== Young Sports Personality ===
The BBC Young Sports Personality of the Year was presented to the sportsperson under the age of 16 on 1 January 2009 for "outstanding sporting achievements". The panel to decide the nominees and winner was chaired by Humphrey, and included the broadcasters Helen Skelton of Blue Peter, Ore Oduba from Sportsround, two representatives each from the Youth Sport Trust and the Sports Personality of the Year and two previous Young Sports Personality recipients in Harry Aikines-Aryeetey and Kate Haywood. The panel convened on 9 November to determine the first ten nominees from a BBC and Youth Sport Trust compiled list and returned a fortnight later to choose the first three and the recipient with the seven losing nominees informed that they did not make the final shortlist.

Tom Daley, the diver, was named the winner of the award. It was Daley's second win after his first in 2007 and he was the first person to earn the award more than once. He received the accolade from Amir Khan and Ellie Simmonds.

Winner and nominees of the 2009 BBC Young Sports Personality of the Year Award
Nominee	Sport	2009 achievement
Tom Daley	Diving	Became the first British world champion (at 15 years of age) upon winning 10 metre platform gold at the FINA World Championships.
Heather Watson	Tennis	Won the Junior US Open championship, moving her to No. 3 in the junior world rankings.
Jodie Williams	Athletics	Became the first girl in history to win the gold medal in both the 100 and 200 metres at the World Youth Championships.

=== Special Achievement Award ===
The Special Achievement Award is given out intermittently and was given in 2009 to the comedian and actor Eddie Izzard for their epic marathon feats for Sport Relief. He ran forty-three marathons in fifty-one days and raised over £200,000 for charity. David Walliams had been given the same award for similar efforts three years earlier.

=== Unsung Hero Award ===
The BBC Sports Unsung Hero Award recognised "someone who is dedicating their life to promoting sport in their community, taking no reward from it other than the pleasure of helping others to take part and enjoy their sport." UK, Channel Islands and Isle of Man residents aged 16 or over but no previous winners, BBC employees and anybody working with the award or their close relatives was eligible to be nominated for the accolade on select BBC websites. A national panel of judges composed of leading sporting individuals, BBC Sport and BBC Nations and Regions representatives and a former Unsung Hero Award recipient determined the overall winner and two runners-up from all 15 BBC Nations and Regions. The winner of the award was announced during the show. Doreen Adcock, the Milton Keynes-based swimming instructor, was named the recipient; she received the accolade from the swimmer Rebecca Adlington and the snooker player Jimmy White.

2009 BBC Sports Unsung Hero Award winner
Nationality	Winner	Location	BBC Region	Sport	Rationale	Refs
ENG	Doreen Adcock	Milton Keynes, Buckinghamshire	BBC East	Swimming	for teaching over 13,000 people to swim in the town of Milton Keynes over the last 35 years.	

=== Team of the Year ===
The BBC Sports Team of the Year Award was given to "the (British only) team that has achieved the most notable performance in British sport." A 30-strong judging panel made up of sporting experts from select national and regional magazine and newspaper sports editors determined the winner. They voted for the first and second preferences as their first two selections, with two points going for first position and one point for second. The team with the highest number of points was selected to earn the Team of the Year. The team with the highest number of first positions would earn the award had a tiebreak been declared, although the accolade would be shared if a tie was still present.

England's 2009 Ashes winning cricket team was named the winners of the accolade for the second time after its first in 2005. Flintoff accepted the award on behalf of the team by Dame Kelly Holmes and Joe Calzaghe while it was touring South Africa.

Winner and nominees of the 2009 BBC Sports Team of the Year Award
Nation	Nominee	Sport	2009 achievement
England	England cricket team	Cricket	Won the 2009 Ashes series
England	Brawn GP	Formula One	Won the 2009 Formula One World Constructors' Championship
England	England women's cricket team	Cricket	Won the 2009 Women's Cricket World Cup and the 2009 ICC Women's World Twenty20
Ireland	Irish Rugby	Rugby union	Achieved rugby union's Grand Slam for the second time in the history of Ireland

=== Coach of the Year ===
The BBC Sports Personality of the Year Coach Award had three nominees in 2009 and was won by Fabio Capello.

Winner and Nominees of the 2009 BBC Sports Personality of the Year Coach Award
Nominee	Sport	2009 Achievement
Fabio Capello	Football	Guided England through World Cup qualification, only losing a single game in the process.
Andy Flower	Cricket	Coached England to Ashes victory against Australia.
Alex Ferguson	Football	Won the Premier League for the third consecutive time; the first manager to do so twice.

=== Lifetime Achievement Award ===
The BBC Sports Personality of the Year Lifetime Achievement Award is given to sports people who make an impact during their life. The 2009 Award was given to golfer Seve Ballesteros. This was the second time he was honoured with the reward, the first being in 1997. In 1984, Ballesteros also won the Overseas Personality Award. He was honoured for his contribution to golf. During his career he won The Open three times, The Masters twice, and played a significant role in The Ryder Cup. In 2008, Ballesteros was diagnosed with a malignant brain tumour. José María Olazábal presented the award, whilst Colin Montgomerie paid tribute in the studio.

=== Overseas Personality ===
The BBC Overseas Sports Personality of the Year had three nominees in 2009. Michael Johnson presented the award to the winner, Usain Bolt, who became the third person to win the award in consecutive years after Muhammad Ali and Roger Federer.

Winner and Nominees of the 2009 BBC Overseas Sports Personality of the Year
Nation	Nominee	Sport	2009 Achievement
Jamaica	Usain Bolt	Athletics	Won three golds at the World Championships in Berlin, achieving world records in the 100m and the 200m.
Switzerland	Roger Federer	Tennis	Completed a career Grand Slam for the first time, including a first win at the French Open. His win at Wimbledon was a record fifteenth Grand Slam title.
United States	Tiger Woods	Golf	A much anticipated return to the sport after injury saw Woods win the 2009 Presidents Cup.
