= 2014 BBC Sports Personality of the Year Award =

Sports award in the UK

- Date: 14 December 2014
- Location: The SSE Hydro, Glasgow
- Country: United Kingdom
- Presented by: British Broadcasting Corporation (BBC)
- Hosted by: Gary Lineker; Clare Balding; Gabby Logan
- Winner: Lewis Hamilton
- Website: www.bbc.co.uk/sport/sports-personality

Television/radio coverage
- Network: BBC One; BBC One HD
- Runtime: 140 minutes

The 2014 BBC Sports Personality of the Year Award, took place on 14 December at The SSE Hydro in Glasgow. It was the 61st presentation of the BBC Sports Personality of the Year Award. Awarded annually by the British Broadcasting Corporation (BBC), the main award honours an individual's British sporting achievement over the past year, with the winner selected by public vote from a ten-person shortlist. Lewis Hamilton won the main award.

The event was presented by Gary Lineker, Clare Balding and Gabby Logan.

== Basis of nominations ==
For 2014, the BBC introduced an expert panel who were asked to devise a shortlist that reflected UK sporting achievements on the national and/or international stage, represented the breadth and depth of UK sports and took into account "impact" within and beyond the sport or sporting achievement in question. The 2014 panel was announced on 22 October 2014. The panel members were:

- Rebecca Adlington: Olympic gold medal-winning swimmer
- Denise Lewis: Olympic gold medal-winning athlete
- Jason Roberts: former professional footballer
- Dame Tanni Grey-Thompson: Paralympic gold medal-winning athlete
- Mike Dunn: sports editor of The Independent and Evening Standard newspapers
- Howard Wheatcroft: Express Newspapers head of sport
- Alex Butler: sports editor of the Sunday Times newspaper
- Alison Mitchell: freelance sports broadcaster and journalist
- Louise Martin: chair of SportScotland
- Barbara Slater: Director of BBC Sport
- Philip Bernie: head of BBC TV sport
- Carl Doran; executive editor, BBC Sports Personality of the Year

== Nominees ==
The shortlist of ten contenders was announced during BBC One's The One Show on 24 November and on the BBC website. Early favourites for the award included Rory McIlroy and Lewis Hamilton.

Nominee	Sport	2014 achievement	BBC profile	Votes (percentage)
Lewis Hamilton	Formula One	Won the World Drivers' Championship for the second time, including eleven Grand Prix victories.		209,920 (33.81%)
Rory McIlroy	Golf	Won the Open Championship and PGA Championship. Was also part of the Europe team that retained the Ryder Cup.		123,745 (19.93%)
Jo Pavey	Athletics	Won the 10,000 metres at the European Athletics Championships; at 40 years of age, she became the oldest ever female gold medallist in the championships' history.		99,913 (16.09%)
Charlotte Dujardin	Dressage	Won two titles at the World Equestrian Games in special dressage and freestyle dressage.		75,814 (12.21%)
Kelly Gallagher & Charlotte Evans (guide)	Alpine skiing	Won Great Britain's first ever gold medal in a Winter Paralympics upon winning the visually impaired Super-G.		35,871 (5.78%)
Elizabeth Yarnold	Skeleton	Won the Winter Olympic skeleton title (and Great Britain's fourth consecutive medal in the discipline), plus 4 rounds of the World Cup and the overall title.		23,188 (3.73%)
Max Whitlock	Gymnastics	Won four titles in international championships – three at the Commonwealth Games (team, floor exercise and pommel horse) and the pommel horse at the European Artistic Gymnastics Championships.		17,219 (2.77%)
Gareth Bale	Football	Helped Real Madrid win the UEFA Champions League and Copa del Rey.		13,747 (2.21%)
Carl Froch	Boxing	Retained his IBF and WBA (Regular) super-middleweight titles upon defeating George Groves II, after which he retired.		11,616 (1.87%)
Adam Peaty	Swimming	Won six titles in international championships - four at the European Aquatics Championships (50m/100m breaststroke and 4 × 100 m men's/mixed medley relays) and two at the Commonwealth Games (100m breaststroke and 4 × 100 m men's medley relay).		9,899 (1.59%)

== Other awards ==
In addition to the main award as "Sports Personality of the Year", several other awards were also announced:

- Overseas Personality: Cristiano Ronaldo
- Team of the Year: England women's national rugby union team
- Lifetime Achievement: Sir Chris Hoy
- Coach of the Year: Paul McGinley
- Helen Rollason Award: Invictus Games Competitors
- Young Personality: Claudia Fragapane
- Unsung Hero Award: Jill Stidever

== In Memoriam ==
- David Coleman
- Toby Balding
- Jack Brabham
- Arthur Montford
- Luis Aragones Tito Vilanova
- Dorothy Tyler
- Michael Scudamore Dessie Hughes
- Mickey Duff
- Josie Cichockyj Kevan McNicholas
- Graham Miles
- Norman Mair Stuart Gallacher
- Tom Finney
- Julian Wilson
- Terry Biddlecombe
- Ron Noades Malcolm Glazer
- Bob Torrance
- Bert Williams Dylan Tombides
- Eusebio
- James Alexander Gordon
- Lord Richard Attenborough
- Mary Glen Haig Elenor Gordon
- Phillip Hughes
- Hugh McLeod Jack Kyle
- Keri Holdsworth
- Bobby Collins Sandy Jardine
- Senzo Meyiwa
- Christopher Chataway
- Alfredo Di Stefano
- Elena Baltacha
