= John Cooney (boxer) =

Irish boxer (1996–2025)

Personal information
- Nickname: The Kid
- Nationality: Irish
- Born: John Henry Cooney; 2 April 1996 Ealing, London, England
- Died: 8 February 2025 (aged 28) Belfast, Northern Ireland
- Height: 5 ft 6 in (168 cm)
- Weight: Super-featherweight

Boxing career
- Stance: Southpaw

Boxing record
- Total fights: 12
- Wins: 11
- Win by KO: 3
- Losses: 1

John Henry Cooney (2 April 1996 – 8 February 2025), known professionally as The Kid, was an Irish boxer. During his career he held the Celtic super-featherweight title.

== Personal life ==
Cooney was born in Ealing, London, to Irish parents, Hughie Cooney and Tina Cooney. He grew up in Bournemouth, Dorset, and was educated at St Peter's Catholic Comprehensive School, which he attended from 2007 to 2012. He was the brother of Aaron and Conor Cooney, and the fiancée of Emmaleen Maher.

== Career ==
In 2020, Cooney turned professional, making his pro-debut with a unanimous decision win in a four-round bout against Cristian Abata in Alicante, Spain, on 21 November that year.

He won the vacant Celtic super-featherweight title on 25 November 2023, via a first-round stoppage victory over Liam Gaynor at 3Arena in Dublin.

Having suffered a hand injury which required surgery, Cooney returned to the ring at York Hall in London on 26 October 2024, defeating Tampela Maharusi on points in a six-round contest.

== Death ==
On 1 February 2025, during a fight against Nathan Howells at Ulster Hall in Belfast, Cooney suffered brain damage and was hospitalised. His death at the age of 28 was reported on 8 February, due to the brain damage he sustained.
