= BBC Sports Team of the Year Award =

Annual sport award

- Country: United Kingdom
- Presented by: BBC Sports Personality of the Year
- First award: 1960; 66 years ago
- Most recent winner: European Ryder Cup team (2025)

The BBC Sports Team of the Year Award is an award given annually as part of the BBC Sports Personality of the Year ceremony each December. Currently, the award is given "for the team in an individual sport or sporting discipline that has achieved the most notable performance in the calendar year to date. The team should have significant UK interest or involvement".

== Nomination procedure ==
From 2012 the award's recipient is decided by an expert panel selected by the BBC. For some years before 2012 a panel of over 30 sporting journalists, each of whom voted for their top two choices and followed a defined set of voting criteria. Before that, the winner of the Team of the Year Award has been chosen by public vote and picked by listeners of BBC Radio 5 Live.

== History ==
The Team of the Year Award was first presented in 1960, six years after the BBC Sports Personality of the Year award was introduced. The first recipient of the award was the Cooper Formula One Racing team. The England national rugby union team and the Ryder Cup team have won the award the most times; both teams have won five times and have shared the award on one of those occasions. Liverpool F.C. have won the award four times. The award has been shared on two occasions—by the British women's 4 × 400 m relay team and the British Ryder Cup team in 1969, and by the England national rugby union team and the British men's 4 × 400 m relay team in 1991. Teams have varied greatly in size. The smallest winning team has been two members; the figure skating duo of Torvill and Dean in 1982 and 1983, and the Olympic men's coxless rowing pair of Steve Redgrave and Matthew Pinsent in 1992 and 1996. The largest winning team was in 2012; the British representatives at the 2012 Olympic and Paralympic Games.

Six nations have been represented by the award-winning team. Teams representing Great Britain have won the award the most times, having had twenty-three recipients, three of which shared the award. Excluding the 2000 British Olympic and Paralympic teams, which fielded competitors in many Paralympic and Olympic sports, the remainder of the winning teams have represented 15 sporting disciplines. Although dominated by teams from England or representing Great Britain, the award has been won twice by Scottish teams; Celtic in 1967, after they became the first British football club to win the European Cup, and the 1990 Grand Slam winning Scotland rugby union squad.

Football has had the highest representation among the winners, with 15 recipients. The most recent award was presented in 2025 to the England women's national football team.

== By year ==
- † Denotes joint winners.

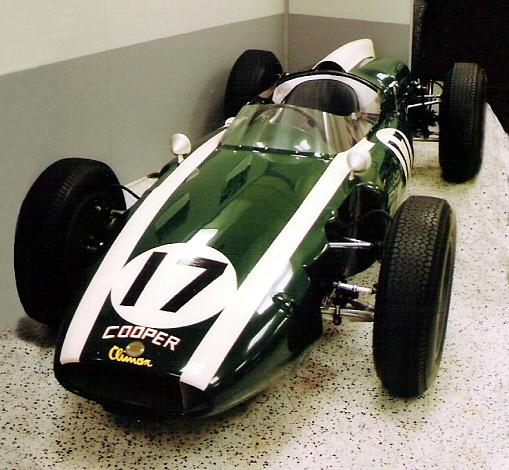
A Cooper T51, similar to the one used by the Cooper Car Company in the 1960 Formula One season

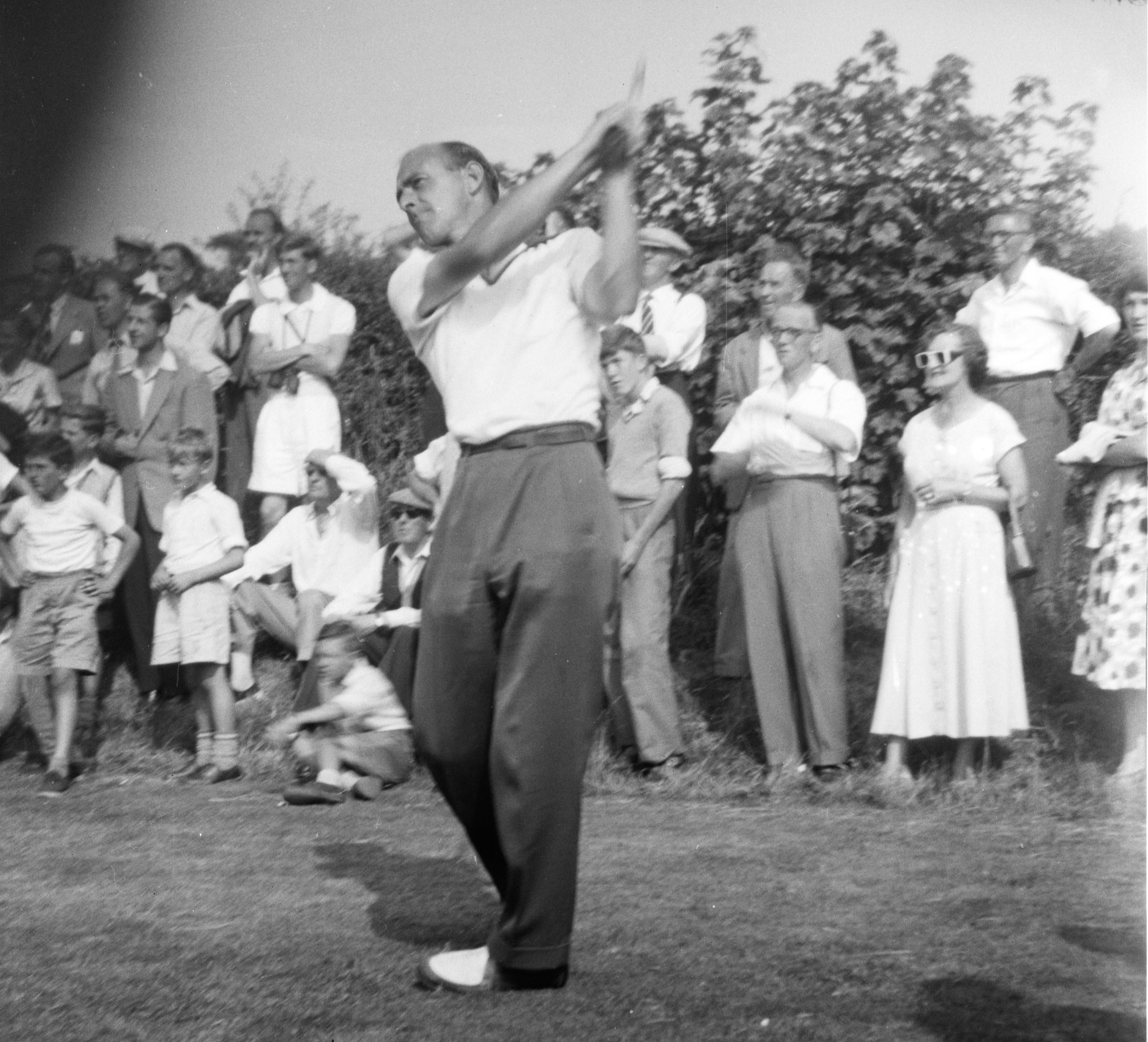
Eric Brown, who captained United Kingdom's 1969 Ryder Cup that won the award that year

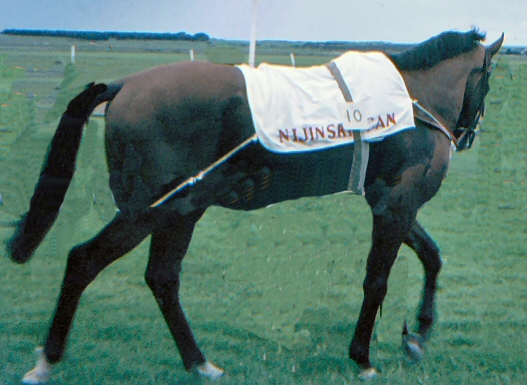
Nijinsky II, whose team took the award in 1970

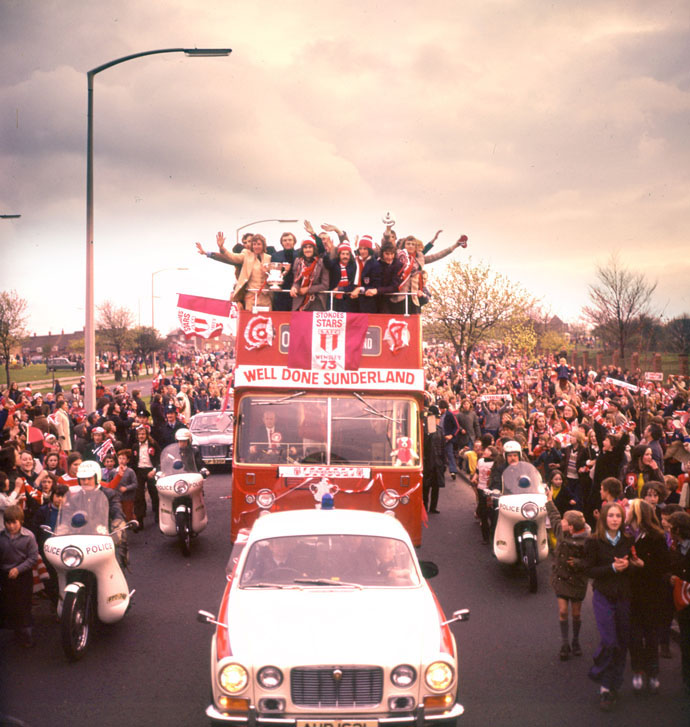
Sunderland, 1973 winners, celebrating their FA Cup win

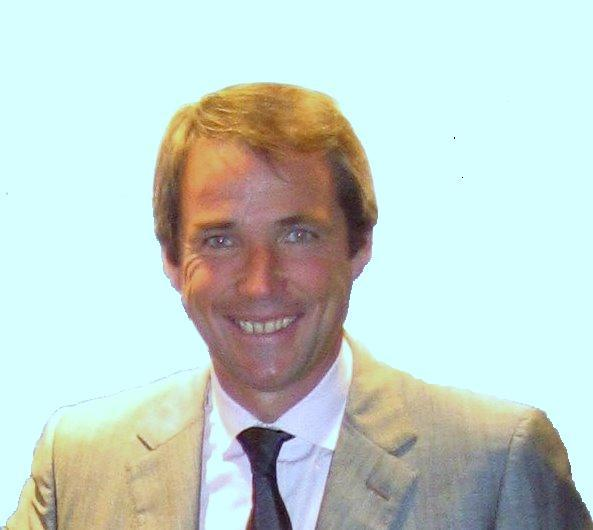
Alan Hansen, who captained the Liverpool F.C. side that won the award in 1986

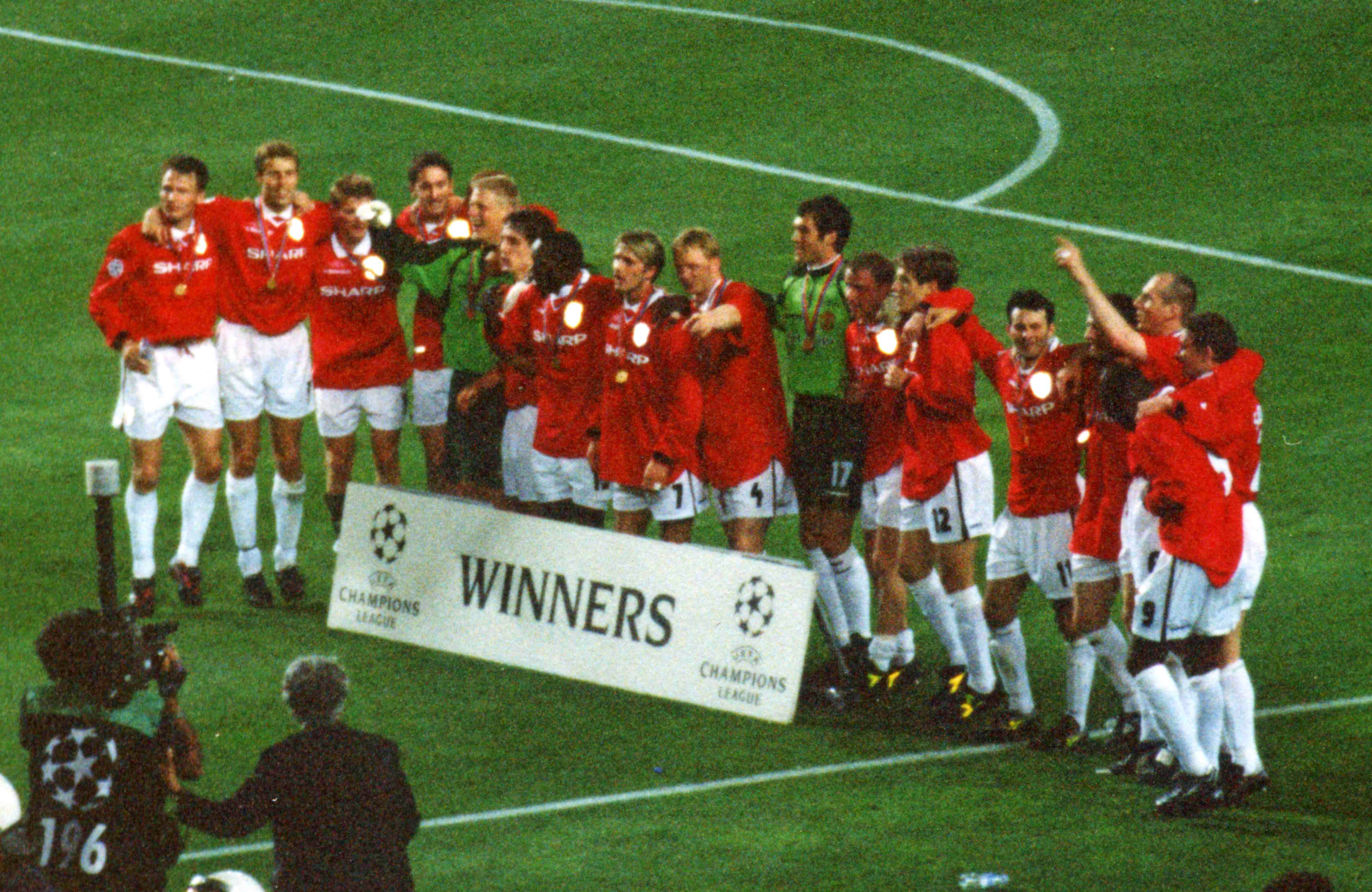
The 1998–99 Manchester United team that won the 1999 award, after becoming the first English team to win the treble

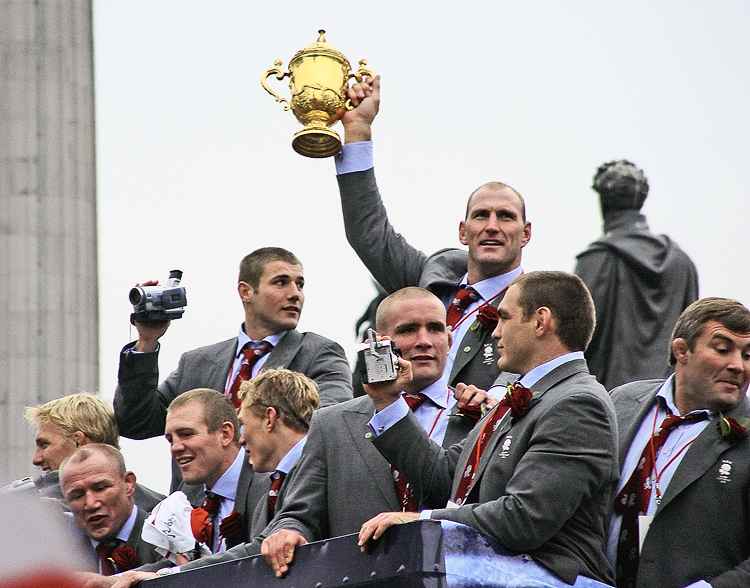
The England rugby union team won the award in 2003 for their victory at the 2003 Rugby World Cup

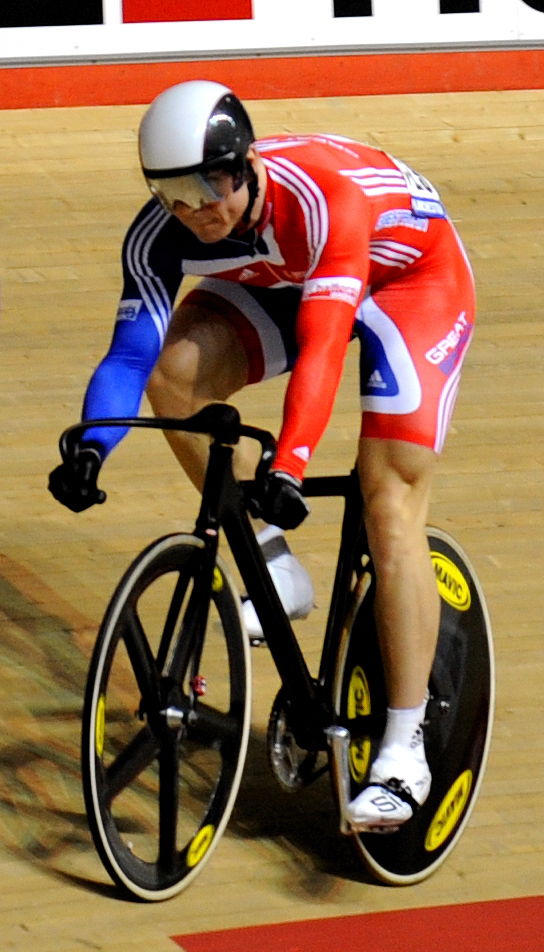
Chris Hoy, a member of the British Olympic Cycling Team that won the award in 2008

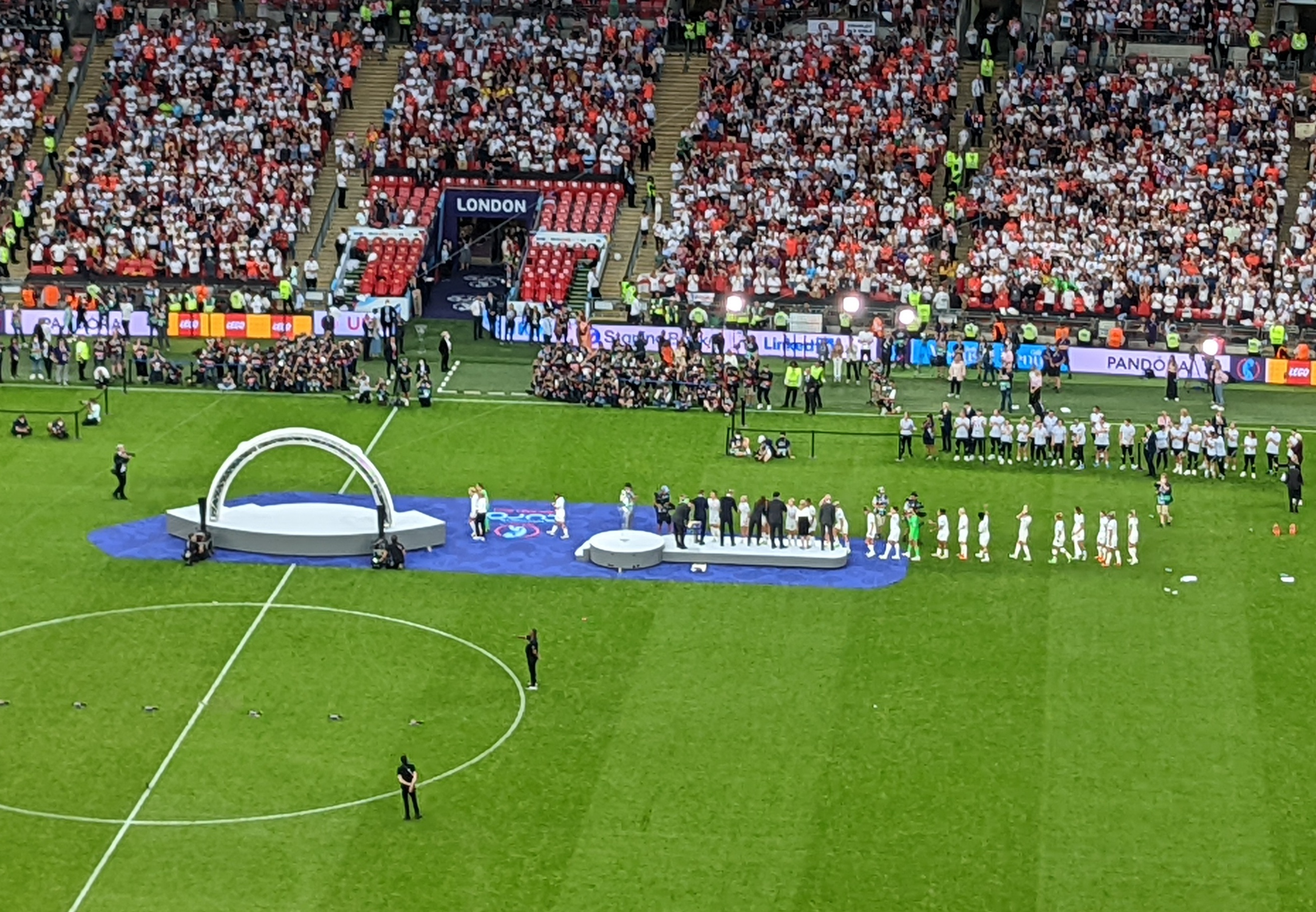
The England women's football team, 2022 award winners, collecting their medal after victory in Euro 2022

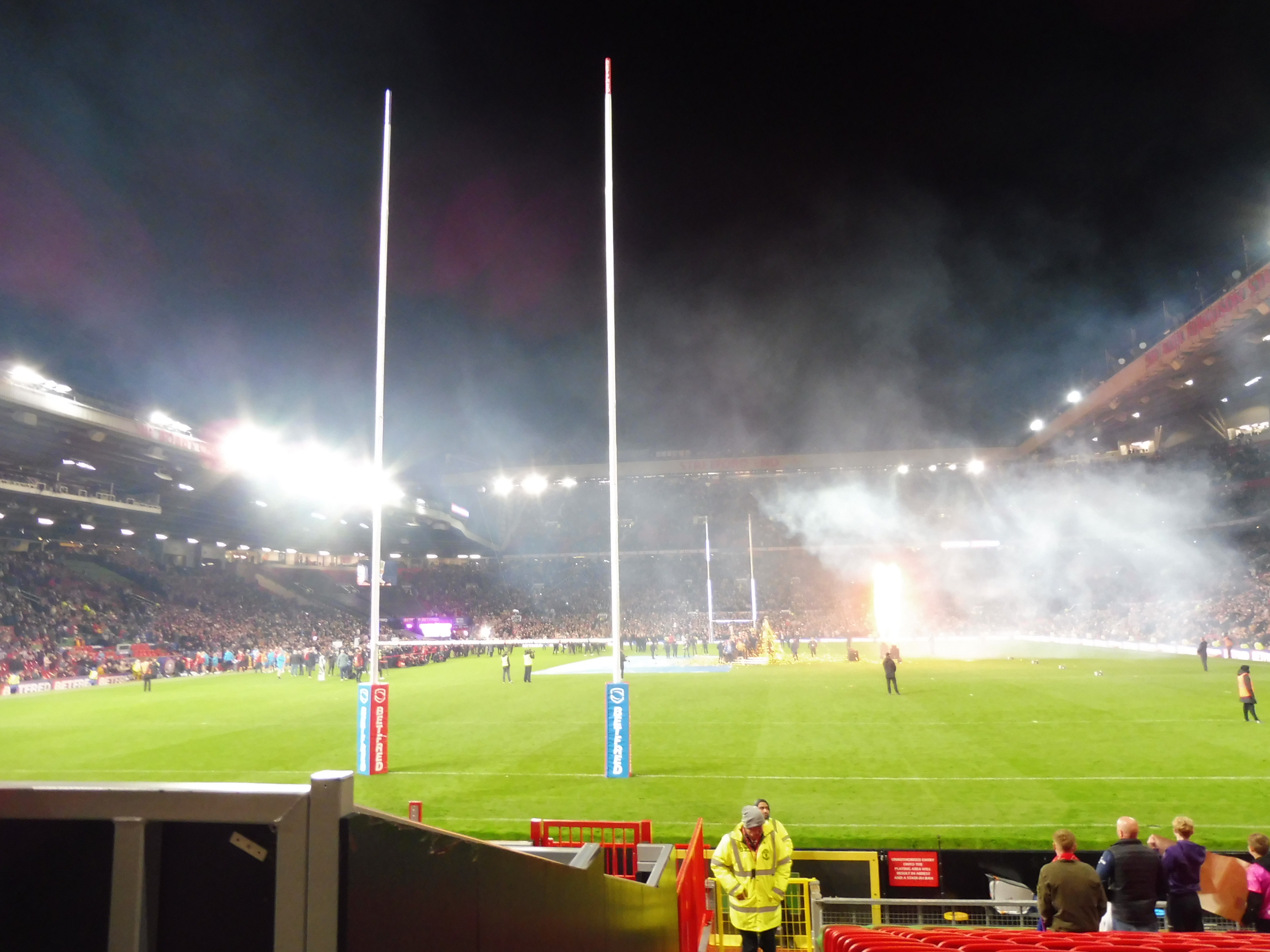
Wigan Warriors, pictured celebrating winning the 2024 Super League Grand Final, won the 2024 award after winning every major trophy available to them, and becoming the only British club to do so twice

BBC Sports Personality Team of the Year Award winners
Year	Nation	Winner	Sport	Note
1960	United Kingdom	Cooper motor racing team	Motor racing	
1961	England	Tottenham Hotspur F.C.	Football	
1962	United Kingdom	BRM motor racing team	Motor racing	
1963	West Indies	West Indies cricket team	Cricket	
1964	England	England under-17 football team	Football	
1965	England	West Ham United F.C.	Football	
1966	England	England football team	Football	
1967	Scotland	Celtic F.C.	Football	
1968	England	Manchester United F.C.	Football	
1969^{†}	United Kingdom	Women's 4 × 400 m relay team	Athletics	
1969^{†}	United Kingdom	Ryder Cup team	Golf	
1970	Canada	Nijinsky horse racing team	Horse racing	
1971	United Kingdom	British Lions rugby union team	Rugby union	
1972	United Kingdom	Olympic three-day event team	Equestrianism	
1973	England	Sunderland A.F.C.	Football	
1974	United Kingdom	British Lions rugby union team	Rugby union	
1975	United Kingdom	Men's Swimming team	Swimming	
1976	United Kingdom	Olympic modern pentathlon team	Modern Pentathlon	
1977	England	Liverpool F.C.	Football	
1978	United Kingdom	Davis and Wightman Cup tennis teams	Tennis	
1979	United Kingdom	Showjumping team	Equestrianism	
1980	England	England rugby union team	Rugby union	
1981	England	Bob Champion and Aldaniti	Horse racing	
1982	United Kingdom	Torvill and Dean	Figure skating	
1983	United Kingdom	Torvill and Dean	Figure skating	(Note: In addition to the Team Award in 1983, an International Team Award was presented to Alan Bond and the rest of Australia II's sailing crew.)
1984	United Kingdom	Olympic Showjumping team	Equestrianism	
1985	Europe	Ryder Cup team	Golf	
1986	England	Liverpool F.C.	Football	(Note: In addition to the Team Award in 1986, a Special Team Award was presented to the Great Britain men's 4 × 400 metres relay team.)
1987	Europe	Ryder Cup team	Golf	
1988	United Kingdom	Olympic hockey team	Hockey	
1989	United Kingdom	Men's athletics squad	Athletics	
1990	Scotland	Scotland rugby union team	Rugby union	
1991^{†}	England	England rugby union team	Rugby union	
1991^{†}	United Kingdom	Men's 4 × 400 m relay team	Athletics	
1992	United Kingdom	Olympic rowing pairs	Rowing	
1993	England	England rugby union team	Rugby union	
1994	England	Wigan R.L.F.C.	Rugby league	
1995	Europe	Ryder Cup team	Golf	
1996	United Kingdom	Olympic rowing pairs	Rowing	
1997	United Kingdom	British Lions rugby union team	Rugby union	
1998	England	Arsenal F.C.	Football	
1999	England	Manchester United F.C.	Football	
2000	United Kingdom	Olympic and Paralympic teams	—	
2001	England	Liverpool F.C.	Football	
2002	Europe	Ryder Cup team	Golf	
2003	England	England rugby union team	Rugby union	
2004	United Kingdom	Olympic men's coxless four	Rowing	
2005	England	England cricket team	Cricket	
2006	England	St Helens R.F.C.	Rugby league	
2007	England	England rugby union team	Rugby union	
2008	United Kingdom	Olympic cycling team	Cycling	
2009	England	England cricket team	Cricket	
2010	Europe	Ryder Cup team	Golf	
2011	England	England cricket team	Cricket	
2012	United Kingdom	Olympic and Paralympic teams	—	
2013	United Kingdom; Republic of Ireland	British & Irish Lions rugby union team	Rugby Union	
2014	England	England women's rugby union team	Rugby union	
2015	United Kingdom	Great Britain Davis Cup team	Tennis	
2016	England	Leicester City F.C.	Football	
2017	England	England women's cricket team	Cricket	
2018	England	England netball team	Netball	
2019	England	England cricket team	Cricket	
2020	England	Liverpool F.C.	Football	
2021	England	England football team	Football	
2022	England	England women's football team	Football	
2023	England	Manchester City F.C.	Football	
2024	England	Wigan R.L.F.C.	Rugby league	
2025	Europe	Ryder Cup team	Golf	

== By nation ==
This table lists the total number of awards won by nations that the teams have represented.

Winners by nation
Nation	Number of wins (Note: The fractions refer to occasions on which the awarded was shared between more than one person. For example, the British & Irish Lions are made up of representatives from both Ireland and the United Kingdom (including when they were called the British Lions).)
England	31
United Kingdom	26
Europe	6
Scotland	2
Republic of Ireland	1
Canada	1
West Indies	1

== By sport ==
This table lists the total number of awards won by the teams sporting discipline.

Winners by sport
Sporting profession	Number of wins (Note: The table excludes the individual Olympic sports that members of the winning 2000 Olympic and Paralympic, and 2012 Olympic and Paralympic teams competed in.)
Football	16
Rugby union	11
Golf	7
Cricket	6
Athletics	4
Equestrianism	3
Rowing	3
Rugby league	3
Figure skating	2
Horse racing	2
Motor racing	2
Tennis	2
Cycling	1
Hockey	1
Netball	1
Swimming	1
