= Robyn Karney =

South African-born British film writer (1940–2017)

Robyn Karney (4 January 1940 – 7 December 2017) was a South African-born London-based film writer and critic.

Karney was born in Cape Town, but raised in Johannesburg. A stage manager for the theatre companies of Brian Brooke and Leonard Schach, she emigrated to London in 1962.

A former critic for the film magazine Empire, Karney edited several books on film including the massive historical works Chronicle of the Cinema (1995) and Cinema Year by Year (2000), both for DK Publishing, and Who's Who in Hollywood (1993). Karney was also the author of biographies of Audrey Hepburn, Charlie Chaplin and Burt Lancaster. With Ronald Bergan (1937–2020), she wrote the Bloomsbury Foreign Film Guide (London: Bloomsbury, 1988, 1991, known as the Holt Foreign Film Guide, then The Faber Companion to Foreign Films in the United States). Her main job, however, was as a literary editor for major publishers.

On 6 January 2009, Karney appeared as expert witness on the BBC Radio 4 series Great Lives with host Matthew Parris and fellow guest Tracy-Ann Oberman in an edition devoted to actress Bette Davis. Karney appeared again on Great Lives, on 12 May 2015, in an edition in which Antonia Quirke championed actor Marlon Brando, with Karney providing a dissenting voice.
