= Great Lives =

British radio series

- Genre: Discussion
- Running time: 28 mins
- Country of origin: Great Britain
- Language: English
- Home station: BBC Radio 4
- Hosted by: Joan Bakewell; Humphrey Carpenter; Francine Stock; Matthew Parris
- Produced by: Chris Ledgard
- Original release: 24 August 2001
- No. of series: 44
- No. of episodes: 282
- Website: Website
- Podcast: Podcast RSS feed

Great Lives is a BBC Radio 4 biography series, produced in Bristol. It has been presented by Joan Bakewell, Humphrey Carpenter, Francine Stock and currently (since April 2006) Matthew Parris. A distinguished guest is asked to nominate the person they feel is truly deserving of the title "Great Life". The presenter and a recognised expert (a biographer, family member or fellow practitioner) are on hand to discuss the person's life. The programmes are 28 minutes long, originally broadcast on Fridays at 23:00, more recently at 16:30 on Tuesday with a repeat at 23:00 on Friday.

== Programmes ==
=== Series 0, August–November 2001 ===
Guest	Nominee	Presenter
Tim Waterstone, founder of bookshop chain	Clement Attlee, former Prime Minister of the United Kingdom	Joan Bakewell
Rosie Boycott, journalist	Sir Ernest Shackleton, polar explorer	Joan Bakewell
Terence Conran, food and design entrepreneur	André and Édouard Michelin, French inventors of the detachable pneumatic tyre and the travel guide	Joan Bakewell
Ralph Steadman, cartoonist and caricaturist	Friedrich Nietzsche, German philosopher	Joan Bakewell
Barbara Castle, Labour politician and former Cabinet Minister	Sylvia Pankhurst, suffragette	Joan Bakewell
Frank Delaney, writer and broadcaster	Henri Matisse, French artist	Joan Bakewell
Jonathan Miller, theatre and opera director, physician	Marshall McLuhan, communication theorist and philosopher	Joan Bakewell
Fay Weldon, writer	H. G. Wells, visionary author	Joan Bakewell
Rabbi Lionel Blue, rabbi and broadcaster	Swami Vivekananda, 19th-century Hindu missionary	Joan Bakewell
Jackie Stewart, racing driver	King Hussein of Jordan	Joan Bakewell
Joan Littlewood, theatre director	Brendan Behan, Irish writer	Joan Bakewell
Lord Tebbit, Conservative politician and former Cabinet Minister	King Alfred the Great, 9th-century King of Wessex	Joan Bakewell

=== Series 1, May–August 2002 ===
Guest	Nominee	Presenter
Ned Sherrin, broadcaster, television producer and stage director	Sir Donald Wolfit, actor-manager	Humphrey Carpenter
Elizabeth Filkin, former Parliamentary Commissioner for Standards	George Eliot, novelist	Humphrey Carpenter
Steven Isserlis, cellist	Franz Schubert, Austrian composer	Humphrey Carpenter
Lord Carrington, Conservative politician and former Foreign Secretary	Field Marshal Viscount Slim, military leader	Humphrey Carpenter
Frederic Raphael, author and screenwriter	Alexander the Great	Humphrey Carpenter
Janet Street-Porter, journalist and media executive	Marquis de Sade, French philosopher, revolutionary politician and libertine	Humphrey Carpenter
Chris Barber, jazz trombonist and bandleader	Louis Armstrong, American jazz trumpeter and singer	Humphrey Carpenter
Sue Limb, writer and broadcaster	Lord Byron, poet	Humphrey Carpenter
Frank Keating, sports writer	Tom Spring, 19th-century bare-knuckle boxer	Humphrey Carpenter
Kirsty Young, broadcaster	Katharine Graham, American newspaper publisher	Humphrey Carpenter

=== Series 2, October–December 2002 ===
Guest	Nominee	Presenter
Bernard Manning, comedian	Mother Teresa of Calcutta, Albanian Roman Catholic nun	Humphrey Carpenter
Sir Paul Nurse, geneticist and cell biologist	Erasmus Darwin, 18th century physician	Humphrey Carpenter
Darcus Howe, writer and broadcaster	C. L. R. James, Caribbean revolutionary and cricket writer	Humphrey Carpenter
Bea Campbell, journalist and author	Rachel Carson, marine biologist and conservationist	Humphrey Carpenter
Muriel Gray, journalist and broadcaster	M. R. James, writer of ghost stories	Humphrey Carpenter
Ahdaf Soueif, novelist and cultural commentator	Umm Kulthum, Egyptian singer, songwriter and actress	Humphrey Carpenter
Professor Sir Harry Kroto, chemist	Spinoza, Portuguese philosopher	Humphrey Carpenter
Steve Bell, political cartoonist	James Gillray, 18th-century caricaturist	Humphrey Carpenter
Tam Dalyell, Labour politician	Richard Crossman, Labour politician and former Cabinet Minister	Humphrey Carpenter
Greg Dyke, media executive	Captain James Cook, explorer	Humphrey Carpenter

=== Series 3, April–June 2003 ===
Guest	Nominee	Presenter
Beryl Bainbridge, novelist	Robert Falcon Scott, polar explorer	Humphrey Carpenter
Leonard Slatkin, conductor and composer	Sergei Rachmaninoff, Russian-American composer	Humphrey Carpenter
John Sergeant, journalist and broadcaster	Arthur Ransome, author and journalist	Humphrey Carpenter
Benjamin Zephaniah, writer and poet	Bob Marley, Jamaican reggae musician	Humphrey Carpenter
Steve Jones, geneticist	James Hogg, poet and novelist	Humphrey Carpenter
Richard Ingrams, journalist and satirist	G. K. Chesterton, writer	Humphrey Carpenter
Stacey Kent, jazz singer,	Powell and Pressburger, film-makers	Humphrey Carpenter
Richard Holmes, military historian	the Man in the Iron Mask, mysterious French prisoner in the Bastille	Humphrey Carpenter
Tanni Grey-Thompson, Welsh athlete and broadcaster,	David Lloyd George, former Prime Minister of the United Kingdom	Humphrey Carpenter
Esther Rantzen, journalist and broadcaster,	Queen Elizabeth I, Queen of England and Ireland	Humphrey Carpenter

=== Series 4, October–December 2003 ===
Guest	Nominee	Presenter
Peter Bazalgette, television executive	Noël Coward, playwright, composer, director, actor and singer	Humphrey Carpenter
Kit Wright, writer	Samuel Johnson, author and lexicographer	Humphrey Carpenter
Kate Adie, war reporter	Flora Sandes, pioneer female soldier	Humphrey Carpenter
Jenny Eclair, comedian	Sarah Bernhardt, French actress	Humphrey Carpenter
Brian Keenan, writer	Bernardo O'Higgins, Chilean independence leader	Humphrey Carpenter
Brenda Dean, trade unionist ad Labour peer	Octavia Hill, co-founder of the National Trust	Humphrey Carpenter
Clement Freud, broadcaster, writer, politician and chef	Tommy Cooper, comedian and magician	Humphrey Carpenter
Armando Iannucci, comedian and writer	Charles Dickens, novelist	Humphrey Carpenter
Linda Smith, comedian	Ian Dury, singer	Humphrey Carpenter
Ann Leslie, journalist	Mary Kingsley, writer and explorer	Humphrey Carpenter

=== Series 5, April–June 2004 ===
Guest	Nominee	Presenter
Lord Alistair McAlpine, Conservative politician	Machiavelli	Humphrey Carpenter
Denis Healey, Labour politician, former Chancellor of the Exchequer	Ernest Bevin, Labour politician, former Foreign Secretary	Humphrey Carpenter
Ruth Lea, economist	Pyotr Tchaikovsky, composer	Humphrey Carpenter
George Monbiot, journalist, environmental activist and writer	Thomas Paine, American author and revolutionary	Humphrey Carpenter
Benedict Allen, explorer	Horatio Nelson, naval hero	Humphrey Carpenter
Charles Wheeler, journalist and broadcaster	Lyndon B. Johnson, 36th President of the United States	Humphrey Carpenter
Kimberley Fortier	Edith Wharton, writer	Humphrey Carpenter
Richard Eyre, theatre director	Anton Chekhov, Russian dramatist	Humphrey Carpenter
Kenneth Clarke, Conservative politician, former Chancellor of the Exchequer	Benjamin Disraeli, 19th century Conservative Prime Minister	Humphrey Carpenter
Lord May, scientist	Joseph Banks, naturalist and botanist	Humphrey Carpenter

=== Series 6, October–December 2004 ===
Guest	Nominee	Presenter
Dillie Keane, actress, singer and comedian	Gilbert & Sullivan, librettist and composer of comic operettas ^{1}	Humphrey Carpenter
Baroness Jay, former Labour Leader of the House of Lords	Vice-Admiral Robert FitzRoy RN, captain of HMS Beagle	Humphrey Carpenter
Christina Gorna, barrister	Vivien Leigh, actress	Humphrey Carpenter
Jilly Goolden, wine expert	Leonard Woolf, writer, publisher and political thinker	Humphrey Carpenter
Gerry Anderson, broadcaster	Burt Lancaster, American actor	Humphrey Carpenter
Tim Marlow, art historian and broadcaster	Marvin Gaye, soul singer	Humphrey Carpenter
Shami Chakrabarti, civil-rights campaigner	George Orwell, author and journalist	Humphrey Carpenter
Marjorie Wallace, writer and charity chief executive	Sir Edward Elgar, composer	Humphrey Carpenter
David Puttnam, film-maker	Michael Collins, Irish nationalist leader (repeat of Programme 1?)	Humphrey Carpenter
Lucinda Lambton, writer and broadcaster	Captain Henry Morgan, privateer	Humphrey Carpenter

- ^{1}The programme originally scheduled was by the guest film-maker David Puttnam (who nominated the Irish nationalist leader Michael Collins). It was withdrawn due to "production quality".

=== Hogmanay Special, 31 December 2004 ===
Guest	Nominee	Presenter
Eddi Reader, Scottish singer-songwriter	Robert Burns, Scottish poet	Humphrey Carpenter^{1}

- Carpenter died on 4 January 2005, this was his last Great Lives programme ^{1}

=== Series 7, April–June 2005 ===
Guest	Nominee	Presenter
Joe Queenan, humorist, critic and author	Genghis Khan, founder of the Mongol Empire	Francine Stock
Mary Kenny, author	George Sand, writer	Francine Stock
Valerie Grove, journalist	Charles M. Schulz, the Peanuts cartoonist	Francine Stock
Douglas Dunn, poet	Robert Louis Stevenson, writer	Francine Stock
Michael Morpurgo, Children's Laureate	Wolfgang Amadeus Mozart, Austrian composer	Francine Stock
Martin Smith, Chairman of English National Opera	John D. Rockefeller, American industrialist, investor and philanthropist	Francine Stock
Yvonne Brown, lawyer	Marcus Garvey, Pan-Africanist leader	Francine Stock
Amanda Vickery, historian	Elizabeth Gaskell, novelist	Francine Stock
Lord Powell	Ronald Reagan, 40th President of the United States	Francine Stock
Frederick Forsyth, novelist	the 1st Duke of Wellington, soldier and statesman	Francine Stock

=== Series 8, October 2005 – February 2006 ===
Guest	Nominee	Presenter
Kathy Lette, writer	Mae West, Hollywood actress	Francine Stock
Carole Stone, author and broadcaster	R. D. Laing, psychiatrist	Francine Stock
Howard Goodall, composer	Samuel Coleridge-Taylor, composer	Francine Stock
Antony Beevor, historian, and Gillian Slovo, novelist	Vasily Grossman, Soviet writer	Francine Stock
Robert Thomson, journalist	Zhao Ziyang, Chinese premier	Francine Stock
Derek Wilson, historian and author	Thomas Cromwell, 16th century politician	Francine Stock
Fiona Reynolds, Director-General of the National Trust	Beatrix Potter, writer	Francine Stock
Adam Hart-Davis, historian and broadcaster	Nevil Shute, novelist and aeronautical engineer	Francine Stock
Helen Lederer, writer and actress	Dorothy Parker, writer and poet	Francine Stock
Annie Nightingale, radio broadcaster	Marty Feldman, comedian and actor	Francine Stock

=== Series 9, April–June 2006 ===
Guest	Nominee	Presenter
Penelope Keith, actress	Morecambe and Wise, comedy double act	Matthew Parris
Jeff Randall, journalist	Andrew Carnegie, Scottish-American industrialist and philanthropist	Matthew Parris
Julian Clary, comedian	Noël Coward, playwright, composer, director, actor and singer^{1}	Matthew Parris
Craig Brown, critic and satirist	Sigmund Freud, Austrian neurologist and psychotherapist	Matthew Parris
Ivan Massow, entrepreneur	Ella Fitzgerald, jazz singer	Matthew Parris
Duncan Goodhew, athlete	Johnny Weissmuller, American athlete-turned Tarzan actor	Matthew Parris
Frances Cairncross, economist, journalist and academic	Ignaz Semmelweis, Hungarian physician and pioneer of antiseptic procedures	Matthew Parris
Anna Raeburn, broadcaster and agony aunt	Tamara Karsavina, Russian ballerina	Matthew Parris
Piers Morgan, journalist and broadcaster	W. G. Grace, English cricketer	Matthew Parris
Krishnan Guru-Murthy, journalist and broadcaster	Robin Day, broadcaster and political interviewer	Matthew Parris

^{1}Coward was previously nominated by Peter Bazalgette in Series 4 Programme 1

=== Series 10, August–September 2006 ===
Guest	Nominee	Presenter
Christopher Hitchens, author and journalist	Leon Trotsky, Russian revolutionary	Matthew Parris
Garry Bushell, newspaper columnist	Max Miller, comedian	Matthew Parris
Helena Kennedy, civil liberties lawyer	Eleanor Roosevelt, First Lady of the United States	Matthew Parris
Jeremy Vine, broadcaster and journalist	W. H. Auden, poet	Matthew Parris
Elaine Showalter, feminist literary critic	Julia Ward Howe, 19th-century American abolitionist, social activist and poet	Matthew Parris
Lord John Biffen, Conservative politician and former Minister	Stanley Baldwin, Conservative Prime Minister	Matthew Parris
Joanna MacGregor, pianist	Nina Simone, singer and civil rights activist	Matthew Parris
Adair Turner, businessman and academic	Charles Darwin, naturalist and evolutionary scientist	Matthew Parris

=== Series 11, December 2006 – January 2007 ===
Guest	Nominee	Presenter
Joe Boyd, record producer	John H. Hammond, record producer	Matthew Parris
Lesley Abdela, feminist campaigner	Millicent Garrett Fawcett, suffragist	Matthew Parris
Kathy Sykes, scientist and broadcaster	Albert Einstein, German-American physicist	Matthew Parris
Victor Spinetti, actor	Joan Littlewood, theatre director	Matthew Parris
Alan Davies, actor and comedian	Richard Beckinsale, actor	Matthew Parris
Camilla Wright, journalist	Martha Gellhorn, American war reporter	Matthew Parris
Anne Fine, author	William Beveridge, economist and social reformer	Matthew Parris
Ann Widdecombe, former Conservative MP and former government minister	Pope John Paul II	Matthew Parris

=== Series 12, April–May 2007 ===
Guest	Nominee	Presenter
Phill Jupitus, comedian	Joe Strummer, frontman of The Clash	Matthew Parris
Nick Danziger, photographer	Tintin, fictional Belgian reporter	Matthew Parris
William Boyd, author	Anton Chekhov, Russian playwright	Matthew Parris
Pallab Ghosh, BBC science correspondent	Marie Curie, Polish chemist and physicist	Matthew Parris
Pauline Black, singer and actor	Billie Holiday, American jazz singer	Matthew Parris
Fiona Bruce, television presenter and newsreader	Mata Hari, Dutch accused spy	Matthew Parris
Yvonne Brewster, theatre director, actress and writer	Claude McKay, poet	Matthew Parris
Barry Cunliffe, archaeologist	Julius Caesar, Roman Emperor	Matthew Parris
Phil Hammond, broadcaster, physician and comedian	George Bernard Shaw, Irish dramatist and Fabian Society pamphleteer	Matthew Parris

=== Series 13, August–October 2007 ===
Guest	Nominee	Presenter
Jude Kelly, theatre director and producer	Lilian Baylis, theatrical producer and manager	Matthew Parris
David Trimble, politician	Elvis Presley, American singer	Matthew Parris
Maggi Hambling, painter and sculptor	Rembrandt, Dutch artist	Matthew Parris
The Earl of Snowdon, photographer and Alex Moulton, engineer	Alec Issigonis, car designer	Matthew Parris
Michael Craig-Martin, conceptual artist	John Cage, avant-garde composer	Matthew Parris
David Rowntree, drummer with Blur and political activist	Lord Denning, judge	Matthew Parris
John Motson, football commentator	Brian Clough, football manager	Matthew Parris
Prue Leith, restaurateur	Elizabeth David, food writer	Matthew Parris
General Sir Michael Rose, British Army officer	George Washington, first President of the United States	Matthew Parris

=== Series 14, December 2007 – January 2008 ===
Guest	Nominee	Presenter
Jan Ravens, impressionist	Thora Hird, actress	Matthew Parris
Quentin Blake, illustrator	George Cruikshank, caricaturist	Matthew Parris
Redmond O'Hanlon, travel writer	Alfred Russel Wallace, naturalist	Matthew Parris
Sir Richard Sykes, biochemist	Howard Florey, pharmacologist and pathologist	Matthew Parris
Roger Graef, documentary maker	Groucho Marx, American comedian and film star	Matthew Parris
Jacqueline Wilson, author of children's literature	Katherine Mansfield, writer	Matthew Parris
Joe Simpson, mountaineer	Hermann Buhl, mountaineer	Matthew Parris

=== Series 15, April–May 2008 ===
Guest	Nominee	Presenter
Mark Gatiss, actor and writer	Peter Cushing, actor	Matthew Parris
Rhona Cameron, comedian	Charles Bukowski, novelist and poet	Matthew Parris
Steve Cram, former athlete	Paavo Nurmi, Finnish runner	Matthew Parris
Stirling Moss, racing car driver	Juan Manuel Fangio, Argentine racing car driver	Matthew Parris
Anna Ford, TV newsreader	Paul Robeson, black singer, actor and civil rights activist	Matthew Parris
Simon Armitage, poet	Ian Curtis, lead singer with Joy Division	Matthew Parris
Nicholas Parsons, actor and radio and TV presenter	Edward Lear, painter and poet	Matthew Parris
Arabella Weir, comedian, actress and writer	Joyce Grenfell, actress, comedian and singer-songwriter	Matthew Parris
Colin Dexter, crime writer	A. E. Housman, scholar and poet	Matthew Parris

=== Series 16, August–September 2008 ===
Guest	Nominee	Presenter
Jon Snow, journalist and broadcaster	Lord Longford, Labour politician and prison reformer	Matthew Parris
David Lammy, politician	Richard Pryor, comedian	Matthew Parris
David Attenborough, zoologist and broadcaster	Robert Hooke, 17th century scientist	Matthew Parris
Bob Harris, radio presenter	Alan Freed, disc jockey	Matthew Parris
George Osborne, then shadow chancellor	Henry VII, king	Matthew Parris
Lesley Riddoch, broadcaster	David Ervine, Northern Ireland politician	Matthew Parris
Mike Jackson, army general	Bill Slim, second world war Field Marshal	Matthew Parris
Deborah Meaden, businesswoman	Lady Hester Stanhope, traveller, diplomat and spy	Matthew Parris
Ian Hislop, editor of Private Eye	William Hogarth, painter, engraver and satirist	Matthew Parris

=== Series 17, December 2008 – February 2009 ===
Guest	Nominee	Presenter
Harvey Goldsmith, performing arts promoter	Luciano Pavarotti, Italian operatic tenor	Matthew Parris
Michael Grade, broadcasting executive	Billy Marsh, theatrical agent	Matthew Parris
Raymond Briggs, illustrator and writer	Beachcomber, columnist	Matthew Parris
David Soul, actor	Dietrich Bonhoeffer, German theologian and Resistance figure	Matthew Parris
Tracy-Ann Oberman, actress	Bette Davis, American film actress	Matthew Parris
Pam Ayres, poet	Tony Hancock, comedian and actor	Matthew Parris
Rachel De Thame, horticulturalist	Margot Fonteyn, ballerina	Matthew Parris
Ken Livingstone, former mayor of London	Robert F. Kennedy, American politician and brother of President John F. Kennedy	Matthew Parris

=== Series 18, April–May 2009 ===
Guest	Nominee	Presenter
Stuart Hall, broadcaster	Napoleon Bonaparte, Emperor of France	Matthew Parris
Polly Toynbee, journalist	Roy Jenkins, Labour politician	Matthew Parris
David Mellor, politician	Thomas Beecham, conductor	Matthew Parris
Ruby Wax, American comedian	Carl Jung, Swiss founder of analytical psychology	Matthew Parris
Colin Murray, broadcaster	Frank Sinatra, American singer	Matthew Parris
Andy Sheppard, saxophonist	John Coltrane, saxophonist	Matthew Parris
Michael O'Donnell, broadcaster and physician	Fred Astaire, dancer and actor	Matthew Parris
Misha Glenny, journalist	Giovanni Falcone, Italian judge and anti-Mafia campaigner	Matthew Parris

=== Series 19, August–September 2009 ===
Guest	Nominee	Presenter
Andrew Motion, Poet Laureate	Alfred, Lord Tennyson, Poet Laureate	Matthew Parris
David Miliband, Member of Parliament and (then) Foreign Secretary	Joe Slovo, South African ANC leader	Matthew Parris
George Galloway, Member of Parliament	John Cornford, poet and activist	Matthew Parris
Dervla Murphy, travel writer	Freya Stark, travel writer	Matthew Parris
Rolf Harris, Australian television presenter and artist	Kyffin Williams, Welsh artist	Matthew Parris
Boris Johnson, (then) the mayor of London	Samuel Johnson, writer of the great dictionary	Matthew Parris
Kate Humble, TV presenter	Miriam Makeba, South African singer and anti-apartheid activist	Matthew Parris
Paul Daniels, magician	Harry Houdini, American escapologist	Matthew Parris
John Major, former British Prime Minister	Rudyard Kipling, poet and author	Matthew Parris

=== Series 20, December 2009 – February 2010 ===
Guest	Nominee	Presenter
Sir Ranulph Fiennes, explorer	Henry V, King of England	Matthew Parris
Rich Hall, stand-up comedian	Tennessee Williams, American dramatist	Matthew Parris
Neil Innes, musician and performer	Vivian Stanshall, musician and comic writer	Matthew Parris
Munira Mirza, London Mayoral advisor on arts and culture	Hannah Arendt, German-American political philosopher	Matthew Parris
Christopher Biggins, actor and television presenter	Nero, Roman Emperor	Matthew Parris
Jenny Agutter, actress	Lise Meitner, Austrian physicist	Matthew Parris
David Bailey, photographer	Pablo Picasso, Spanish artist	Matthew Parris
John Williams, composer	Agustin Barrios Mangore, Paraguayan guitarist	Matthew Parris
Richard Dawkins, ethologist and evolutionary biologist	Bill Hamilton, evolutionary theorist	Matthew Parris

=== Series 21, April–May 2010 ===
Guest	Nominee	Presenter
John Godber, playwright	Bertolt Brecht, writer and theatre director	Matthew Parris
Clive Stafford Smith, human rights lawyer	Robin Hood, folklore hero	Matthew Parris
Peter White, broadcaster	Douglas Jardine, England cricket captain	Matthew Parris
John Lloyd, comedy writer and television producer	Richard Buckminster Fuller, architect and futurist	Matthew Parris
Stuart Rose, chairman of Marks and Spencer	Matthew Flinders, cartographer	Matthew Parris
Baroness Sarah Hogg, economist and journalist	Charlotte Guest, polymath and businesswoman	Matthew Parris
Brian Cox, physicist	Carl Sagan, astronomer and astrophysicist	Matthew Parris
Viv Anderson, England footballer	Arthur Wharton, athlete and football player	Matthew Parris

=== Series 22, August–September 2010 ===
Guest	Nominee	Presenter
John Harris, journalist and author	John Lennon, musician	Matthew Parris
Bettany Hughes, historian	Sappho, Ancient Greek poet	Matthew Parris
Dominic Sandbrook, historian	Richard Nixon, 37th President of the United States	Matthew Parris
Camila Batmanghelidjh, founder of Kids Company	Mary Carpenter, educational and social reformer	Matthew Parris
Eleanor Bron, actress	Simone Weil, French philosopher and mystic	Matthew Parris
Edwina Currie, former Member of Parliament and government minister	Golda Meir, former Prime Minister of Israel	Matthew Parris
Digby Jones, former director of the CBI	Winston Churchill, former Prime Minister of the United Kingdom	Matthew Parris
Robert Winston, surgeon, scientist, broadcaster and politician	Michel de Montaigne, writers of the French Renaissance	Matthew Parris
Gerald Scarfe, cartoonist	Walt Disney, animator	Matthew Parris

=== Series 23, November 2010 – January 2011 ===
Guest	Nominee	Presenter
Mark Borkowski, public relations	Malcolm McLaren, impresario and talent manager	Matthew Parris
John Hegley, poet	D. H. Lawrence, novelist	Matthew Parris
Gerry Robinson, businessman	Samuel Beckett, Irish playwright	Matthew Parris
Lionel Blair, dancer and television personality	Sammy Davis Jr., dancer, singer and entertainer	Matthew Parris
Neil Kinnock, former Leader of the Labour Party	Aneurin Bevan, founder of the NHS and Labour Cabinet Minister	Matthew Parris
Barry Cryer, comedian	J. B. Priestley, novelist and playwright	Matthew Parris
Jim Al-Khalili, Iraqi-born physicist	Gertrude Bell, writer, traveller, politician and administrator	Matthew Parris
Katherine Whitehorn, journalist	Mary Stott, campaigning journalist	Matthew Parris
Kwame Kwei-Armah, playwright and actor	Marcus Garvey, African-American political leader ^{1}	Matthew Parris

- Garvey was previously nominated by Yvonne Brown in Series 7 Programme 7 ^{1}

=== Series 24, April–May 2011 ===
Guest	Nominee	Presenter
Clive Sinclair, British inventor	Thomas Edison, American inventor	Matthew Parris
Charles Hazlewood, conductor	Leonard Bernstein, conductor and composer	Matthew Parris
Diana Quick, actress	Simone de Beauvoir, French philosopher	Matthew Parris
Sue MacGregor, broadcaster	Kathleen Ferrier, contralto singer	Matthew Parris
Lynne Truss, writer and journalist	Lewis Carroll, author of Alice in Wonderland and mathematician	Matthew Parris
Caroline Lucas, British Green Member of Parliament	Petra Kelly, German Green politician	Matthew Parris
Matthew Syed, sports journalist	Jack Johnson, "the Galveston Giant", boxer	Matthew Parris
Diane Abbott, Member of Parliament	Harold Pinter, playwright	Matthew Parris

=== Series 25, August–September 2011 ===
Guest	Nominee	Presenter
Tim Butcher, journalist	Graham Greene, author and critic	Matthew Parris
Janice Long, broadcaster	Kirsty MacColl, singer-songwriter	Matthew Parris
Gwyneth Lewis, poet	Emily Dickinson, American poet	Matthew Parris
Antonio Carluccio, Italian restaurateur	Eduardo Paolozzi, artist	Matthew Parris
Daisy Goodwin, broadcaster and poetry curator	William Shakespeare, poet and playwright	Matthew Parris
Simon Day, comedian and actor	Hans Fallada, German writer	Matthew Parris
Simon Jenkins, journalist	Edwin Lutyens, architect	Matthew Parris
Cerys Matthews, musician	Hildegard of Bingen, German mystic	Matthew Parris
Graeme le Saux, former England footballer	Gerald Durrell, author and conservationist	Matthew Parris

=== Series 26, December 2011 – January 2012 ===
Guest	Nominee	Presenter
Michael Sheen, actor	Philip K. Dick, science fiction writer	Matthew Parris
Raymond Tallis, philosopher	Ludwig Wittgenstein, German philosopher	Matthew Parris
Steven Pinker, psychologist and cognitive scientist	Thomas Hobbes, philosopher	Matthew Parris
Brian Sewell, art critic	Ludwig II of Bavaria	Matthew Parris
Jim Carter, actor	Lonnie Donegan, skiffle musician	Matthew Parris
Martin Rees, astrophysicist	Joseph Rotblat, physicist and campaigner against nuclear weapons	Matthew Parris
Emma Kennedy, actress	Gracie Allen, comedian	Matthew Parris
Clare Gerada, doctors' leader	Vera Brittain, writer, feminist and pacifist	Matthew Parris
Baroness Warsi, Conservative politician and former government minister	Razia Sultana, 13th-century Indian princess	Matthew Parris

=== Series 27, April–May 2012 ===
Guest	Nominee	Presenter
Owen Sheers, Welsh poet	Dylan Thomas, Welsh poet	Matthew Parris
Will Self, journalist and novelist	Oscar Wilde, Irish dramatist and writer	Matthew Parris
Erin Pizzey, writer and campaigner	Gertrude Stein, writer, philanthropist and art collector	Matthew Parris
Tom Robinson, singer, broadcaster and activist	George Lyward, educationalist, teacher and psychotherapist who worked at Finchden Manor	Matthew Parris
Alexei Sayle, comedian	Edward Said, Palestinian-American literary theorist and campaigner for Palestinian rights	Matthew Parris
Eric Pickles, politician	John Ford, American film director	Matthew Parris
Diana Athill, British literary editor, novelist and memoirist	Francisco Goya, Spanish painter	Matthew Parris
Lynn Barber, British journalist and interviewer	Sebastian Walker, founder of Walker Books, a publishing house for children	Matthew Parris

=== Series 28, July–September 2012 ===
Guest	Nominee	Presenter
Des Lynam, sports commentator	Henry Cooper, English heavyweight boxer	Matthew Parris
Janine di Giovanni, foreign correspondent and author	Josephine Bonaparte, wife of Napoleon Bonaparte	Matthew Parris
Rory Stewart, Conservative Member of Parliament, author and adventurer	Sir Walter Scott, Scottish novelist	Matthew Parris
Bill Paterson, actor	Leonard Maguire, Scottish actor	Matthew Parris
Natalie Haynes, comedian	Juvenal, Roman poet	Matthew Parris
Ken Dodd, comedian	Stan Laurel, film actor and one half of the duo Laurel and Hardy	Matthew Parris
Stephen Frears, film director	Karel Reisz, film director	Matthew Parris
Alan Johnson, politician and former Labour Home Secretary	George Orwell, writer	Matthew Parris
Naomi Wolf, commentator and author of The Beauty Myth	Edith Wharton, novelist, wit and feminist	Matthew Parris

=== Series 29, December 2012 – January 2013 ===
Guest	Nominee	Presenter
Martin Broughton, chairman of British Airways and the British Horse Racing Board	Dick Francis, crime novelist and former jockey	Matthew Parris
Francesca Simon, children's writer and author of the Horrid Henry books	Jean Cocteau, French writer, artist and film director	Matthew Parris
Lemn Sissay, author and broadcaster	Prince Alemayehu, favourite prince of Queen Victoria	Matthew Parris
Stuart Maconie, radio presenter and music critic	Ralph Vaughan Williams, composer and folk music collector	Matthew Parris
Richard Herring, comedian	Grigori Rasputin, Russian Orthodox mystic	Matthew Parris
Max Mosley, former president of the Fédération Internationale de l'Automobile (FIA)	John Stuart Mill, philosopher	Matthew Parris
Laurence Llewelyn-Bowen, interior designer	Aubrey Beardsley, artist of the Aesthetic movement	Matthew Parris
Grace Dent, journalist	Nancy Mitford, novelist and biographer	Matthew Parris
Carol Klein, gardening expert	William Robinson, Irish-born journalist and gardener	Matthew Parris

=== Series 30, April–May 2013 ===
Guest	Nominee	Presenter
Peter Hitchens, author and columnist	George Bell, Anglican theologian and bishop	Matthew Parris
Bobby Friction, DJ and presenter	Galileo Galilei, Italian pioneer astronomer	Matthew Parris
Chris Tarrant, television presenter	Kenny Everett, comedian and former disc jockey	Matthew Parris
John Blashford-Snell, explorer	David Livingstone, explorer	Matthew Parris
Gyles Brandreth, writer and broadcaster	Arthur Conan Doyle, author	Matthew Parris
Justine Roberts, founder of Mumsnet, a website for parents	Bill Shankly, football manager	Matthew Parris
John Cooper Clarke, poet	Salvador Dalí, Spanish surrealist painter	Matthew Parris
Edmund de Waal, ceramicist and writer	Primo Levi, Italian Holocaust survivor, writer and chemist	Matthew Parris
Dr Lucy Worsley, Chief Curator at Historic Royal Palaces	Florence Nightingale, nurse, health administrator and statistician	Matthew Parris

=== Series 31, August–October 2013 ===
Guest	Nominee	Presenter
Russell Grant, astrologer and broadcaster	Ivor Novello, composer and actor	Matthew Parris
Gabriel Gbadamosi, playwright	Fela Kuti, Nigerian musician	Matthew Parris
Tanika Gupta	Rabindranath Tagore, Indian poet	Matthew Parris
Julie Burchill, writer	Ava Gardner, American film star	Matthew Parris
Paul Mason, journalist and broadcaster	Louise Michel, 19th century French anarchist	Matthew Parris
Peter Bowles, actor	George Devine, theatre director	Matthew Parris
Konnie Huq, television presenter and writer	Ada Lovelace, computing pioneer	Matthew Parris
Brendan Barber, trade unionist	John Steinbeck, American novelist	Matthew Parris
Al Murray, comedian	Bernard Montgomery, WW2 British General	Matthew Parris

=== Series 32, December 2013 – January 2014 ===
Guest	Nominee	Presenter
Ricky Ross, singer with Deacon Blue	Hank Williams, singer-songwriter	Matthew Parris
Michael Horovitz, poet	Allen Ginsberg, Beat poet	Matthew Parris
Meg Rosoff, novelist	Isabella Bird, Victorian traveller	Matthew Parris
David Chipperfield, architect	Le Corbusier, Swiss-French architect	Matthew Parris
David Baddiel, comedian	John Updike, novelist	Matthew Parris
Adil Ray, actor and TV personality	Dave Allen, comedian	Matthew Parris
Mark Constantine, businessman and founder of Lush cosmetics	Kahlil Gibran, poet	Matthew Parris
Sara Cox, radio presenter	Lisa 'Left Eye' Lopes, hip-hop artist	Matthew Parris

=== Series 33, April–May 2014 ===
Guest	Nominee	Presenter
Evelyn Glennie, percussionist	Jacqueline du Pré, cellist	Matthew Parris
Sarah Vine, newspaper columnist	Dante Alighieri, 12th-13th century Italian poet	Matthew Parris
Mark Walport, Chief Scientific Adviser	Hans Sloane, art collector and benefactor of the British Museum	Matthew Parris
Marcus du Sautoy, mathematician	Jorge Luis Borges, Argentinian writer	Matthew Parris
Deborah Moggach, novelist	Arnold Bennett, 19th-century novelist	Matthew Parris
Isy Suttie, comedian, musician and actor	Jake Thackray, singer-songwriter	Matthew Parris
John Craven, journalist and television presenter	Isambard Kingdom Brunel, 19th-century British engineer	Matthew Parris
Emma Kirkby, soprano singer	Henry Purcell, 17th-century composer	Matthew Parris
Michael Palin, Python, writer and broadcaster	Ernest Hemingway, American writer	Matthew Parris

=== Series 34, August–October 2014 ===
Guest	Nominee	Presenter
Jonathan Meades, writer and broadcaster	Edward Burra, artist	Matthew Parris
Jazzie B, DJ and music entrepreneur	James Brown, American singer	Matthew Parris
Oona King, politician	Ida B. Wells, American journalist and civil rights leader	Matthew Parris
Ray Mears, woodsman and TV presenter	Rommel, German field marshal of World War II	Matthew Parris
Tom Shakespeare, sociologist	Gramsci, Italian Marxist politician	Matthew Parris
Labi Siffre, poet and singer-songwriter	Arthur Ransome, author and journalist	Matthew Parris
Stella Rimington, former Director General of MI5 and writer	Dorothy L. Sayers, crime writer	Matthew Parris
Andrew Adonis, Baron Adonis, politician and academic	Joseph Bazalgette, Victorian engineer responsible for London's main sewers	Matthew Parris
Edith Hall, classicist	Lucille Ball, American actress and comedian	Matthew Parris

=== Series 35, December 2014 – January 2015 ===
Guest	Nominee	Presenter
Arthur Smith, comedian	Emil Zátopek, Czechoslovak distance runner	Matthew Parris
Laura Bates, feminist writer	Louisa May Alcott, 19th century American author of Little Women	Matthew Parris
Brian Eno, musician	Michael Young, sociologist and politician	Matthew Parris
Tom Solomon, neurologist	Roald Dahl, children's writer	Matthew Parris
Philippa Langley, historian	Richard III, 15th -century King of England	Matthew Parris
Michael Dobbs, politician and novelist	Guy Burgess, spy	Matthew Parris
Eve Pollard, journalist & former newspaper editor	Nora Ephron, American screenwriter	Matthew Parris
Mervyn King, former Governor of the Bank of England	Risto Ryti, Governor of Bank of Finland, Prime Minister and President of Finland during World War II	Matthew Parris

=== Series 36, April–June 2015 ===
Guest	Nominee	Presenter
Trevor McDonald, news presenter	Learie Constantine, Trinidadian cricketer and politician	Matthew Parris
Rachel Johnson, author & journalist	Lady Ottoline Morrell, literary hostess and associate of the Bloomsbury Group	Matthew Parris
Kulvinder Ghir, comedian & actor	Zoran Mušič, Slovene artist and survivor of Dachau	Matthew Parris
Helen Ghosh, Director General of the National Trust	James Lees-Milne, writer and expert on country houses	Matthew Parris
Wendy Cope, poet	John Clare, 19th-century poet	Matthew Parris
Antonia Quirke, film critic	Marlon Brando, American actor	Matthew Parris
Matthew Barzun, American ambassador	John Gil Winant, American ambassador to UK 1941–46	Matthew Parris
David Blunkett, blind politician	Louis Braille, 18th-century French inventor of Braille	Matthew Parris
Val McDermid, crime writer	P. D. James, crime writer	Matthew Parris

=== Series 37, August–September 2015 ===
Guest	Nominee	Presenter
Ian McKellen, actor	Edmund Hillary, mountaineer and explorer	Matthew Parris
Vicky Pryce, Greek-born former British Government economist	Melina Mercouri, Greek actress, singer and politician	Matthew Parris
Michael Howard, former Conservative Party leader	Queen Elizabeth I, English monarch	Matthew Parris
Ade Adepitan, television personality and Paralympian	George Washington Williams, American Civil War veteran and historian	Matthew Parris
Monica Ali, novelist	Richard Francis Burton, explorer and adventurer	Matthew Parris
Frances Crook, prison reformist	Barbara Castle, Labour Party politician and former Cabinet Minister	Matthew Parris
Hannah Rothschild, philanthropist and documentary filmmaker	Thelonious Monk, jazz musician	Matthew Parris
Nick Stadlen, former High Court judge	Bram Fischer, South African lawyer and anti-apartheid activist	Matthew Parris
Toyah Willcox, singer & actress	Katharine Hepburn, Hollywood actress	Matthew Parris

=== Series 38, December 2015 – January 2016 ===
Guest	Nominee	Presenter
Dickie Bird, cricket umpire	Sir Leonard Hutton, English cricketer	Matthew Parris
Roger Saul, founder of the Mulberry fashion label	Gertrude Jekyll, garden designer	Matthew Parris
Alvin Hall, financial journalist	James Baldwin, African American writer	Matthew Parris
Precious Lunga, epidemiologist	Wangari Maathai, Kenyan environmental and political activist	Matthew Parris
Martin Jennings, sculptor	Charles Sargeant Jagger, sculptor of British World War One war memorials	Matthew Parris
Susan Calman, Scottish comedian	Molly Weir, Scottish actress	Matthew Parris
Nitin Sawhney, musician and producer	Jeff Buckley, singer-songwriter	Matthew Parris
Eliza Manningham-Buller, former Director General of MI5	Abraham Lincoln, 16th President of the United States	Matthew Parris

=== Series 39, April–May 2016 ===
Guest	Nominee	Presenter
Anthony Horowitz, novelist and screenwriter	Alfred Hitchcock, film director	Matthew Parris
Nancy Dell'Olio, lawyer	Lucrezia Borgia, Italian princess	Matthew Parris
Ray Peacock, Comedian	Lenny Bruce, Comedian	Matthew Parris
Sudha Bhuchar, actress	Zohra Sehgal, Indian actress	Matthew Parris
Graeme Lamb, SAS commando	Christine Granville, spy	Matthew Parris
Timmy Mallett, TV presenter	Richard the Lionheart, King	Matthew Parris
Charles Moore, journalist	Gordon Hamilton-Fairley, medical oncology	Matthew Parris
Ann Limb, chair of the Scout Association	George Fox, founder of the Quakers	Matthew Parris
Frank Turner, folk singer	Joseph Grimaldi, comedian	Matthew Parris

=== Series 40, August–September 2016 ===
Guest	Nominee	Presenter
Hilary Devey, television personality	Gracie Fields, actress	Matthew Parris
Alex Salmond, Scottish former First Minister	Thomas Muir, Father of Scottish Democracy.	Matthew Parris
Sara Pascoe, stand-up comedian	Virginia Woolf, writer	Matthew Parris
Georgina Godwin, journalist	Dag Hammarskjöld, Secretary General of the United Nations	Matthew Parris
Tony Hawks, comedian	Marshall Rosenberg, psychologist	Matthew Parris
Maureen Lipman, actress	Cicely Saunders, nurse	Matthew Parris
Eliza Carthy, folk musician	Caroline Norton, poet	Matthew Parris
A. A. Gill, writer	Neville Chamberlain, former Prime Minister of the United Kingdom	Matthew Parris
Cyrus Todiwala, chef	Dadabhai Naoroji, first British Indian MP	Matthew Parris

=== Series 41, December 2016 – January 2017 ===
Guest	Nominee	Presenter
Lucy Porter, comedian	Cary Grant, American actor	Matthew Parris
Ben Kingsley, actor	Elie Wiesel, Romanian-born, American Jewish Nobel laureate	Matthew Parris
Orlando Murrin, food writer	Dinu Lipatti, Romanian pianist	Matthew Parris
Ruth Holdaway, sports personality	Helen Rollason, sports journalist	Matthew Parris
Suzannah Lipscomb, historian	C. S. Lewis, novelist	Matthew Parris
Akram Khan, choreographer	Srinivasa Ramanujan, mathematician	Matthew Parris
Len Goodman, dancer	Lionel Bart, composer	Matthew Parris
Chris Patten, Chancellor of the University of Oxford	Pope John XXIII, pope	Matthew Parris

=== Series 42, April–May 2017 ===
Guest	Nominee	Presenter
Gary Kemp, songwriter	Edward William Godwin, architect	Matthew Parris
Germaine Greer, feminist writer	Dame Elisabeth Frink, sculptor	Matthew Parris
Ermonela Jaho, soprano	Mother Teresa, nun	Matthew Parris
Anton du Beke, dancer	Arnold Palmer, golfer	Matthew Parris
Peaches Golding, consultant	Shirley Chisholm, Member of U.S. Congress (Dem)	Matthew Parris
Steven Knight, screenwriter	Sitting Bull, Lakota chief	Matthew Parris
Sue Cameron, columnist	Emma of Normandy, queen consort	Matthew Parris
Peter Williams, businessman	Steve Jobs, co-founder of Apple Inc	Matthew Parris
Iain Lee, broadcaster	Andy Kaufman, entertainer and performance artist	Matthew Parris

=== Series 43, August–September 2017 ===
Guest	Nominee	Presenter
Maxine Peake, actor	Ellen Wilkinson, Labour MP and Cabinet Minister	Matthew Parris
Stephen Fry, comedian, actor and writer	P.G. Wodehouse, writer, creator of Jeeves	Matthew Parris
Sathnam Sanghera, journalist and author	Alexander Gardner, explorer	Matthew Parris
Don McCullin, photojournalist	Norman Lewis, travel writer	Matthew Parris
Tracy Chevalier, novelist	Mary Anning, fossil collector and working-class woman from Lyme Regis	Matthew Parris
Helen Sharman, first British in space	Elsie Widdowson, dietitian	Matthew Parris
Nicholas Stern, Economist	Muhammad Ali, boxer and civil rights activist	Matthew Parris
Andrea Catherwood, presenter and journalist	Constance Markievicz, Irish politician and suffragette	Matthew Parris
Helena Morrissey, City boss	Rachael Heyhoe Flint, cricketer and businesswoman	Matthew Parris

=== Series 44, December 2017 – January 2018 ===
Guest	Nominee	Presenter
Will Gregory, musician	Flann O'Brien, novelist	Matthew Parris
Cornelia Parker, sculptor	Marcel Duchamp, French painter	Matthew Parris
Louise Richardson, political scientist	Daniel O'Connell, Barrister	Matthew Parris
Nazir Afzal, Chief Crown Prosecutor	Mahatma Gandhi, Indian independence leader	Matthew Parris
Helen Arney, presenter	Hertha Ayrton, physicist, and suffragette	Matthew Parris
Gisela Stuart, Labour MP	Joseph Chamberlain, Liberal MP	Matthew Parris
Justin Marozzi, historian	Herodotus, Ancient Greek historian	Matthew Parris
Liza Tarbuck, actress	Nikola Tesla, Serbian inventor	Matthew Parris

=== Series 45, April–May 2018 ===
Guest	Nominee	Presenter
Vic Reeves, comedian, actor and artist	Captain Beefheart, American musician	Matthew Parris
Ayesha Hazarika, comedian and political commentator	Jayaben Desai, trade unionist	Matthew Parris
Adrian Utley, musician	Miles Davis, American jazz musician	Matthew Parris
Laura Serrant, professor	Audre Lorde, American poet and activist	Matthew Parris
Tej Lalvani, businessman	Richard Feynman, American theoretical physicist	Matthew Parris
Simon Callow, actor	Orson Welles, American actor	Matthew Parris
Mica Paris, soul singer	Josephine Baker, American Vaudeville performer	Matthew Parris
Suzy Klein, TV and Radio presentator	Hedy Lamarr, actress	Matthew Parris
Barbara Stocking, former head of Oxfam	Catherine the Great, Empress of Russia	Matthew Parris

=== Series 46, July–September 2018 ===
Guest	Nominee	Presenter
Hanif Kureishi, writer	David Bowie, musician	Matthew Parris
Erica Wagner, former literary editor of The Times	Roald Amundsen, Norwegian polar explorer	Matthew Parris
Simon Evans, comedian	John Stuart Mill, philosopher	Matthew Parris
Patricia Greene, actor	Elizabeth, Countess of Shrewsbury	Matthew Parris
Helen Glover, Olympic rower	Alison Hargreaves, mountaineer	Matthew Parris
Greg Jenner, historian	Gene Kelly, American dancer	Matthew Parris
Cherie Blair, barrister	Rose Heilbron, England's first woman judge	Matthew Parris
Mark Carwardine, zoologist	Douglas Adams, writer	Matthew Parris
Christina Lamb, author and correspondent	Benazir Bhutto, former Prime Minister of Pakistan	Matthew Parris

=== Series 47, December 2018 – January 2019 ===
Guest	Nominee	Presenter
Samira Ahmed, freelance journalist,	Laura Ingalls Wilder, American writer	Matthew Parris
Russell Kane, writer, comedian	Evelyn Waugh, English writer	Matthew Parris
Tim Smit, businessman	Humphrey Jennings, English documentary filmmaker	Matthew Parris
Mark Steel, comedian	Charlie Chaplin, actor and comedian	Matthew Parris
Nikesh Shukla, author	Ghulam Mohammad, Great Gama, Pakistani wrestler	Matthew Parris
Suzanne O'Sullivan, neurologist	Oliver Sacks, neurologist and author	Matthew Parris
Rohan Silva, former policy advisor to David Cameron and George Osborne	Colin Chapman, creator of Lotus Cars	Matthew Parris
Matt Lucas, comedian, screenwriter, actor	Freddie Mercury, musician, songwriter, lead vocalist of Queen	Matthew Parris

=== Series 48, April–May 2019 ===
Guest	Nominee	Presenter
Shappi Khorsandi, comedian	Emma, Lady Hamilton, spouse of Lord Nelson	Matthew Parris
Helen Lewis, journalist	Catherine de' Medici, Queen consort of France	Matthew Parris
Tom Holland, historian	Aethelflaed, Lady of the Mercians	Matthew Parris
Ian McMillan, poet	Malcolm Lowry, writer	Matthew Parris
Kirill Gerstein, Russian American pianist	Ferruccio Busoni, composer	Matthew Parris
Caroline Criado-Perez, feminist campaigner	Jane Austen, writer	Matthew Parris
Jeremy Deller, artist	Brian Epstein, The Beatles' manager	Matthew Parris
Shirley Collins, folk singer	Alan Lomax, American song-hunter	Matthew Parris
Kamila Shamsie, writer	Asma Jahangir, human rights lawyer	Matthew Parris

=== Series 49, July–September 2019 ===
Guest	Nominee	Presenter
Lucy Irvine, adventurer and author	Robinson Crusoe, fictional characters	Matthew Parris
Ed Balls, British Labour and Co-operative politician	Herbert Howells, composer	Matthew Parris
Laura Marling, folk singer-songwriter	Lou Andreas-Salome, first woman psychoanalyst	Matthew Parris
Caroline Quentin, actress	Sir John Vanbrugh, playwright and architect	Matthew Parris
Shaun Ley, Broadcaster	Ramsay MacDonald, First UK Labour Prime Minister	Matthew Parris
Philippa Perry, psychotherapist	Maria Montessori, Italian educator	Matthew Parris
Fiona Shaw, actress	Eleonora Duse, actress	Matthew Parris
Sindhu Vee, comedian	Prince Rogers Nelson	Matthew Parris
Chibundu Onuzo, author	Constance Cummings-John, Sierra Leonean educationist	Matthew Parris

=== Series 50, December 2019 – January 2020 ===
Guest	Nominee	Presenter
Peter Oborne, journalist	William Brown and his creator, Richmal Crompton	Matthew Parris
Lindsey Hilsum, Channel 4 News reporter	Lee Miller, War photographer and model	Matthew Parris
Jeremy Paxman, broadcaster	Nicholas Ashley-Cooper, 12th Earl of Shaftesbury, politician	Matthew Parris
Janice Turner, journalist	Enid Blyton, novelist	Matthew Parris
Bill Bailey, comedian	Alfred Russel Wallace, naturalist	Matthew Parris
Ken Clarke, politician	Charlie Parker, Jazz sax player	Matthew Parris
Josie Long, comedian	Kurt Vonnegut, American author	Matthew Parris
Andi Oliver, chef	Toni Morrison, American Nobel Prize-winning author	Matthew Parris

=== Series 51, April–June 2020 ===
Guest	Nominee	Presenter
Rick Stein, chef	Jim Morrison, rock singer	Matthew Parris
Frank Cottrell-Boyce, script writer	Tove Jansson, creator of the Moomins	Matthew Parris
Kate Stables, musician	Ursula K. Le Guin, American author	Matthew Parris
Olivette Otele, historian	Maya Angelou, African-American writer	Matthew Parris
Daniel Rigby, TV author	Victoria Wood, comedian	Matthew Parris
Sally Phillips, comedian	Myrna Loy, American film actress	Matthew Parris
Anand Menon, political scientist	Billy Bremner, footballer	Matthew Parris
Sara Wheeler, author	Sybille Bedford, author	Matthew Parris
Dolly Alderton, author	Doris Day, American actress	Matthew Parris

=== Series 52, August–September 2020 ===
Guest	Nominee	Presenter
Margaret MacMillan, Canadian historian	Benito Mussolini, Italian fascist dictator	Matthew Parris
Jessie Burton, author	Frida Kahlo, Mexican painter	Matthew Parris
Peter Frankopan, historian	Konstantin Tsiolkovsky, Soviet rocket scientist	Matthew Parris
Jessie Ware, English singer	Donna Summer, American singer	Matthew Parris
Frances O'Grady, trade unionist	Ernest Bevin, Labour politician and trade unionist	Matthew Parris
Tom Allen, comedian	Kenneth Williams, English actor	Matthew Parris
David Adjaye, Ghanaian-British architect	Okwui Enwezor, Nigerian curator	Matthew Parris
James Graham, playwright	John Maynard Keynes, economist	Matthew Parris
Michael Wood, historian	Xuanzang, Chinese monk and traveller	

=== Series 53, December 2020 – January 2021 ===
Guest	Nominee	Presenter
Philippa Gregory, novelist	Katherine Parr, sixth wife of Henry VIII	Matthew Parris
David Spiegelhalter, professor	Frank Ramsey, mathematician	Matthew Parris
Diane Morgan, comedian	Hugh Dowding, Air Chief Marshal	Matthew Parris
Robert Rinder, barrister	Jessica Mitford, civil rights activist and investigative journalist	Matthew Parris
David Jonsson, actor	Jean-Michel Basquiat, American artist	Matthew Parris
Caroline Catz, actor	Delia Derbyshire, composer	Matthew Parris
Cori Crider, human rights lawyer	Cesar Chavez, Rights activist	Matthew Parris

=== Series 54, April–June 2021 ===
Guest	Nominee	Presenter
Jonathan Kent, director	Patricia Highsmith, author of The Talented Mr Ripley	Matthew Parris
Yasmin Alibhai-Brown, journalist and author	Chinua Achebe, novelist	Matthew Parris
Eddie Piller, broadcaster and record producer	Kenny Lynch, singer, songwriter, entertainer	Matthew Parris
KT Tunstall, singer-songwriter	Ivor Cutler, poet, author, artist and humorist	Matthew Parris
Jonathan Dimbleby, broadcaster	Harry Hopkins, American statesman	Matthew Parris
Arlo Parks, singer-songwriter	Elliott Smith, singer	Matthew Parris
Ben Miller, actor, comedian and author	William Hazlitt, critic and essayist	Matthew Parris
Rosie Millard, journalist and broadcaster	Edward III of England, king	Matthew Parris

=== Series 55, August–September 2021 ===
Guest	Nominee	Presenter
Michael Booth, author	Hans Christian Andersen, author	Matthew Parris
Tasmin Little, violinist	Yehudi Menuhin, violinist	Matthew Parris
Devi Sridhar, professor of global public health	Althea Gibson, tennis player	Matthew Parris
Lindsay Johns, writer and broadcaster	Frantz Fanon, psychiatrist and philosopher	Matthew Parris
Tristram Hunt, director of the V&A	Josiah Wedgwood, master potter	Matthew Parris
Peggy Seeger, folk singer	Ewan MacColl, folk singer and activist	Matthew Parris
Dorothy Byrne, president of Murray Edwards College	Catherine of Siena, saint, mystic, activist and author	Matthew Parris
Yanis Varoufakis, politician and economist	Hypatia, ancient Greek mathematician	Matthew Parris
Ruth Rogers, chef and restaurateur	James Baldwin, African-American writer	Matthew Parris

=== Series 56, December 2021 – January 2022 ===
Guest	Nominee	Presenter
Niall Ferguson, historian	J. R. R. Tolkien, author of The Lord of the Rings	Matthew Parris
Rory Sutherland, marketing guru	Johnny Ramone, musician	Matthew Parris
Nina Sosanya, actor	Jeanne Baret, first female circumnavigator	Matthew Parris
Priyanga Burford, actor	Noor-un-Nissa Inayat Khan, princess and WWII special agent	Matthew Parris
Richard Walker, MD of Iceland	William Lever, founder of Unilever	Matthew Parris
Lady Hale, judge	Lady Rhondda, suffragette and businesswoman	Matthew Parris
Roma Agrawal, engineer and author	Mrinalini Sarabhai, Indian classical dancer	Matthew Parris
Henry Normal, poet	Spike Milligan, author and Goon	Matthew Parris

=== Series 57, April–May 2022 ===
Guest	Nominee	Presenter
Brian Cox, actor	Lindsay Anderson, film director	Matthew Parris
Donald Macintyre, journalist	Tom Hopkinson, newspaper editor	Matthew Parris
Janet Ellis, Blue Peter presenter	Kaye Webb, Puffin Books editor	Matthew Parris
Lolita Chakrabarti, playwright and actor	Ira Aldridge, actor	Matthew Parris
Joe Swift, garden designer	Gil Scott-Heron, poet and musician	Matthew Parris
Terry Christian	Tony Wilson, "Mr Manchester"	Matthew Parris
Rob Newman, comedian	Franklin D. Roosevelt, US President	Matthew Parris
Anna Maxwell Martin, actor	Joan Rhodes, strongwoman	Matthew Parris
Susie Boyt, novelist	Judy Garland, film-star	Matthew Parris

=== Series 58, May–September 2022 ===
Guest	Nominee	Presenter
Pat Nevin, footballer	Johan Cruyff, Dutch footballer	Matthew Parris
Holly Walsh, comedian	BS Johnson, novelist	Matthew Parris
Bobby Seagull, mathematics teacher	Ravi Shankar, Indian sitarist	Matthew Parris
John Timpson, businessman	Kathleen Ollerenshaw, educationalist	Matthew Parris
Kate Bingham, venture capitalist	Rosalind Franklin, chemist	Matthew Parris
Romy Gill, food writer	Amrita Pritam, poet	Matthew Parris
Lesley Garrett, soprano singer,	George Lascelles, 7th Earl of Harewood, opera manager	Matthew Parris
Cressida Cowell , children's author,	Astrid Lindgren, creator of Pippi Longstocking	Matthew Parris
Bonnie Greer, playwright	The women of the Morant Bay rebellion	Matthew Parris

=== Series 59, December 2022 – January 2023 ===
Guest	Nominee	Presenter
Olia Hercules, Ukrainian chef and food writer	Alla Horska, Ukrainian painter	Matthew Parris
Olivia Laing, writer	Christopher Lloyd, gardener and writer	Matthew Parris
Noddy Holder, frontman of Slade	Chuck Berry, Rock'n'roll pioneer	Matthew Parris
Bob Harris, radio presenter	Matt Busby, football player and manager	Matthew Parris
Minette Batters, President of NFU	Henry Plumb, Baron Plumb, politician	Matthew Parris
Nick Hayes & Patrick Barkham	Roger Deakin, writer, wild swimmer, environmentalist	Matthew Parris
Chris McCausland, comedian	Kurt Cobain, musician in Nirvana	Matthew Parris
Adjoa Andoh, actor	Zora Neale Hurston, writer and anthropologist	Matthew Parris

=== Series 60, April–May 2023 ===
Guest	Nominee	Presenter
Qasa Alom, broadcaster	Arthur Ashe, tennis champion	Matthew Parris
Christopher Clark, historian	Frederick the Great, King of Prussia	Matthew Parris
Dwayne Fields, 2nd black man to reach North Pole	Matthew Henson, 1st black man to reach North Pole	Matthew Parris
John Robins, comedian	Frank Zappa, musician	Matthew Parris
Gillian Burke, biologist and TV presenter	Kofi Annan, UN Secretary-General	Matthew Parris
Jesse Norman, government minister	Edward Coke, prosecutor of Guy Fawkes	Ian Hislop
Jon Ronson, journalist	Terry Hall, musician with The Specials	Ian Hislop
Jake Arnott, novelist	John Gay, 18th-century writer	Ian Hislop

=== Series 61, June–September 2023 ===
Guest	Nominee	Presenter
Ellie Gibson, comedian	Tony Benn, politician	Matthew Parris
Susie Dent, etymologist,	Thomas Mann, German writer	Matthew Parris
Matthew Gould, diplomat	Stamford Raffles, colonialist	Matthew Parris
Sophie Scott, neuroscientist	Hattie Jacques, actress	Matthew Parris
Kate Raworth, scientist	Donella Meadows, environmentalist	Matthew Parris
Chris Watson, musician	Ludwig Koch, broadcaster	Matthew Parris
David Bintley, ballet dancer	Ninette de Valois, dancer	Matthew Parris
Patrick Holden, dairy farmer	Lady Eve Balfour, organic farmer	Matthew Parris
Chi-chi Nwanoku, musician	Jessye Norman, American opera singer	Matthew Parris
Ken Loach, film director	Gerrard Winstanley, religious reformer	Matthew Parris

=== Series 62, November 2023 – January 2024 ===
Guest	Nominee	Presenter
Walter Murch, American film director	Mohammad Mossadegh, former Iranian prime minister	Matthew Parris
Iszi Lawrence, broadcaster	Diana Barnato Walker, aviator	Matthew Parris
John Gray, philosopher	JG Ballard, writer	Matthew Parris
Faye Tozer, singer	Eartha Kitt, singer	Matthew Parris
Jimmy Wales, co-founder of the Wikipedia	Thomas Jefferson, 3rd President of the United States	Matthew Parris
Mr Motivator, fitness instructor	Harry Belafonte, singer and civil rights activist	Matthew Parris
Niamh Cusack, actor	Mary Oliver, poet	Matthew Parris
Simon Mayo, radio DJ	Alan Freeman, radio DJ	Matthew Parris

=== Series 63, April 2024 – May 2024 ===
Guest	Nominee	Presenter
Harry Enfield, comedian	Gerard Hoffnung, cartoonist	Matthew Parris
Steve Richards, broadcaster	Sir Bruce Forsyth, television presenter	Matthew Parris
Baroness Ros Altmann, Conservative peer	Antoni Gaudí, architect	Matthew Parris
Katherine Rundell, writer	E. Nesbit, writer	Matthew Parris
James Dyson, inventor and businessman	Frank Whittle, aircraft engineer	Matthew Parris
Alice Roberts, TV presenter and author	Queen Emma, Queen	Matthew Parris
Hayaatun Sillem, CEO	Lady Rachel MacRobert, geologist and feminist	Matthew Parris
Harriet Harman, Labour MP	Maria Callas, opera singer	Matthew Parris
Mary Portas, retail consultant and broadcaster	Anita Roddick, businesswoman	Matthew Parris

=== Series 64, August 2024 – September 2024 ===
Guest	Nominee	Presenter
Miriam Margolyes, actress	Charles Dickens, writer	Matthew Parris
Zing Tsjeng, journalist	Hilma af Klint, painter	Matthew Parris
Julien Temple, film director	Christopher Marlowe, playwright	Matthew Parris
Conn Iggulden, writer	Nero, Roman Emperor	Matthew Parris
Henry Marsh, neurosurgeon	Ignaz Semmelweis, physician and scientist	Matthew Parris
Jo Brand, comedian	Bessie Smith, blues singer	Matthew Parris
Anneka Rice, TV and radio presenter	Jane Morris, model and muse	Matthew Parris

=== Series 65, December 2024 – February 2025 ===
Guest	Nominee	Presenter
Ekow Eshun, writer and broadcaster	Justin Fashanu, the first professional footballer to be openly gay	Matthew Parris
Doug Allan, wildlife cameraman and photographer	Jacques Cousteau, French naval officer, oceanographer, filmmaker and author	Matthew Parris
Hannah Critchlow, scientist, writer and broadcaster	Colin Blakemore, neurobiologist, specialising in vision and the development of the brain	Matthew Parris
Lauren Cuthbertson, ballerina	Margot Fonteyn, ballerina	Matthew Parris
Pen Hadow, Arctic region explorer and advocate	Peter Scott, conservationist, founder of the Wildfowl & Wetlands Trust	Matthew Parris
Reginald D. Hunter, comedian	Eugene V. Debs, five-time candidate of the Socialist Party of America for President of the United States	Matthew Parris
Jessica Fostekew, comedian	Boudica, warrior queen	Matthew Parris
A. N. Wilson, writer	Johann Wolfgang von Goethe, polymath	Matthew Parris
Ellen E. Jones, media journalist	Florynce Kennedy, lawyer and activist	Matthew Parris
Mark Billingham, crime writer	George Harrison, Beatle and more	Matthew Parris

=== Series 66, April 2025 – ===
Guest	Nominee	Presenter
Maggie Hambling, artist	Henrietta Moraes, model and muse	Matthew Parris
Jonathan Maitland, playwright	Benny Hill, comedian	Matthew Parris
Kevin Cummins, photographer	Richey Edwards, musician	Matthew Parris
Alex von Tunzelmann, writer and presenter	Ned Ludd, legenday namesake of the Luddites	Matthew Parris
Hilary Bradt, travel publisher	Dervla Murphy, Irish cyclist and travel writer	Matthew Parris
Raymond Blanc, chef	Nicholas Kurti, physicist	Matthew Parris
Rebecca Humphries, actress and author	Tina Turner, Rock icon	Matthew Parris
Hannah Bourne-Taylor, author	Emily Williamson, co-founder of the RSPB	Matthew Parris
Mike Bode, professor of astrophysics	Seretse Khama, first president of Botswana	Matthew Parris
