= The Film programme =

The Film programme may refer to:

- The Film Programme, a BBC Radio 4 programme
- Film... (TV programme), a BBC television programme which is renamed annually, e.g. in 2018 the programme is titled Film 2018
