= Tom Brook =

British journalist

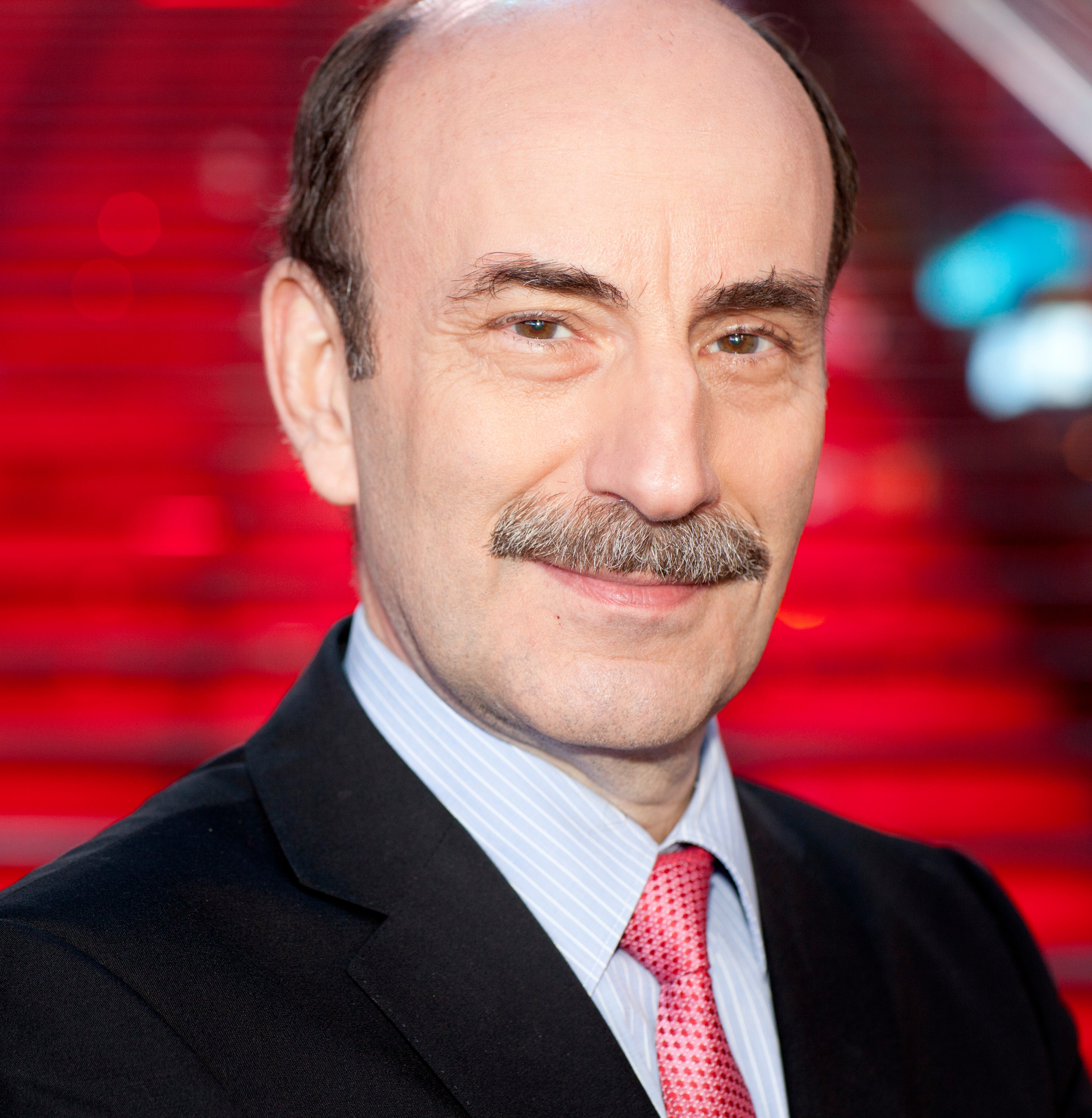
- Tom Brook in 2013
- Born: 16 June 1953 (age 73); London, United Kingdom
- Education: Magdalene College, Cambridge
- Occupation: News reporter
- Years active: 1976 – present

Tom Brook (born 16 June 1953) is a British journalist who is based in New York and works primarily for BBC News. He is mainly seen on BBC World News, and also the BBC News Channel. He is the main presenter of its flagship cinema programme Talking Movies, and has presented every episode since it was first broadcast in February 1999. He is also a member of the Critics Choice Association.

== Broadcasting career ==
Brook joined the BBC in April 1976 as a news trainee and, after working attachments in Belfast, Birmingham, and Manchester, he was appointed as a producer on Radio 4's Today programme in 1978. In January 1980, he was posted to the BBC's office in New York as a news and current affairs producer. On the night of 8 December 1980, he was the first British journalist to report live from outside the home of John Lennon in the Dakota Apartment building on New York's Upper West Side, following the murder of the former Beatle.

Since 1985, he has reported on the US film industry for the BBC. From 1985 to 1998, Brook was BBC One's US correspondent for the top-rated Film series presented by Barry Norman. In 1999, he began presenting and producing the cinema news programme Talking Movies for the BBC, which, as of 2020 has surpassed 500 episodes. He has an international following among movie fans and key figures in the global film industry.

The programme covers cinema news from around the world, as well as delivering reviews of the latest films and exclusive interviews with top Hollywood and international talent. The longevity of the series has also allowed Brook to report from some of the world's top film festivals, including Cannes, Sundance, Toronto and London.

In 2019 the programme marked a significant milestone with its twentieth anniversary on the air. Special anniversary editions of the show were recorded in front of a live audience in New York and Mumbai in which Sir Kenneth Branagh and Bollywood megastar Shah Rukh Khan were guests of honour.

He has also covered the Academy Awards for BBC News every year since 1985, frequently reporting live from the red carpet.

Brook has interviewed some of the most celebrated names in international cinema including such Twentieth Century greats as James Cagney and Bette Davis. He has also interviewed some of America's most influential personalities from CBS veteran anchorman Walter Cronkite on his last day of presenting at the network as well as former President's Carter and Ford. More recently, some of the big names he has interviewed include Adam Driver, Cynthia Erivo, Dev Patel, Renee Zellweger and Barry Jenkins.

Over the years, Brook has contributed to numerous additional BBC programmes and outlets, including Breakfast, Correspondent, Front Row, The Late Show, The Six O'Clock News, BBC America, BBC News Channel, Hard Talk Extra, and Today on BBC Radio 4.

He has been a frequent online contributor. In 2013 he started writing The Reel World column for BBC Culture on new developments on the big screen.

He is Jewish.

== See also ==
- List of current BBC newsreaders and reporters
