= Talking Movies =

- Genre: Film review
- Presented by: Tom Brook
- Countries of origin: United States; United Kingdom
- Original language: English
- No. of seasons: 14
- No. of episodes: 400+

Production
- Executive producer: Paul Gibbs
- Producer: Tom Brook
- Production location: New York, New York
- Running time: 22 minutes
- Production company: Tom Brook LLC

Original release
- Network: BBC World News BBC America
- Release: February 1999 – present

Related
- Film... Talking Pictures

Talking Movies is a top-rated film news programme broadcast on the BBC, which covers cinema around the world, including delivering reviews of the latest films and exclusive interviews with top Hollywood and international talent. The half-hour flagship programme, with a format conceived by BBC TV Executive Producer, Martin Everard, jointly with presenter journalist Tom Brook premiered in 1999 with the demise of the BBC's Barry Norman film programme, and is broadcast on BBC World News, while shorter Talking Movies reports are broadcast during the week and carried in the mornings on BBC America. At one time, the programme was carried on BBC1, BBC2, BBC News 24 as well as to the 200 million homes on BBC World. An edited version was/is also shown on a number of international airlines' inflight channels.

As of 2012, the programme has run for over 400 editions and features annual episodes covering the Sundance, Cannes and Toronto film festivals. Recently, the programme has traveled to India and Brazil, reporting on the latest developments in cinema in both countries. The programme has a strong following in Asia, North America, and Europe, as well as other parts of the world.

== Format ==
Talking Movies is transmitted in a 30-minute format in a regular spot on BBC World News, and can be seen in shorter sections during news broadcasts throughout the week on BBC America. Since its inception, the show has featured Brook covering the latest film releases from Hollywood, around the world, and from the independent sector. With a strong emphasis on their exclusive interviews, most of the world's top film celebrities have now appeared on the show. In addition to these one-on-ones, each edition of the programme usually features a story on a new trend, or issue, within the world of cinema. Special editions of the programme are seen on the BBC's News Channel. The show also appeared for two seasons on BBC Two.

== Presenters ==
The programme's main presenter and writer is Tom Brook, who is often seen on location in Times Square. He is supported by reporters Manoush Zomorodi and Al Moloney.
