= Billy Marsh =

British theatrical agent

- Born: William Rawlinson Marsh; 19 June 1917; Whitfield, Kent, England
- Died: 19 December 1995 (aged 78); London, United Kingdom
- Occupation: Theatrical agent
- Website: billymarsh.co.uk/about-us/

William Rawlinson Marsh (19 June 1917 – 19 December 1995) was a British theatrical agent. Widely known as the "doyen of theatrical agents", he was the founder and namesake of Billy Marsh Associates, a renowned entertainment agency, in recent times representing the likes of Jon Culshaw, Esther Rantzen and Fiona Phillips, while earlier discovering the careers of Bruce Forsyth and Norman Wisdom.

Marsh is the only theatrical agent ever to be subject of This Is Your Life, surprised by Michael Aspel in 1990.

== Managerial career ==
Billy Marsh worked for Bernard Delfont's London Management company, with responsibility for stars including Morecambe and Wise, until 1987 when he formed his own talent management agency Billy Marsh Associates, which survived him, and was later purchased by Avalon Management Group in 2015.

In 1991, Marsh founded his own show business promotions company, appointing friend and protégé Johnny Mans as managing director and partner, eventually becoming Johnny Mans Productions.

On 17 June 1996, his ashes were interred underneath the stage at The London Palladium, alongside an honorary plaque, which was "in recognition of his belief, encouragement and kindness to countless talented performers, many of whom have become legends upon this stage".

In December 2008 Marsh was the subject of the BBC Radio 4 programme Great Lives, nominated by William G.Stewart, and Michael Grade, the nephew of his long-time employer Bernard Delfont.
