= Matthew Parris =

British journalist and politician (born 1949)

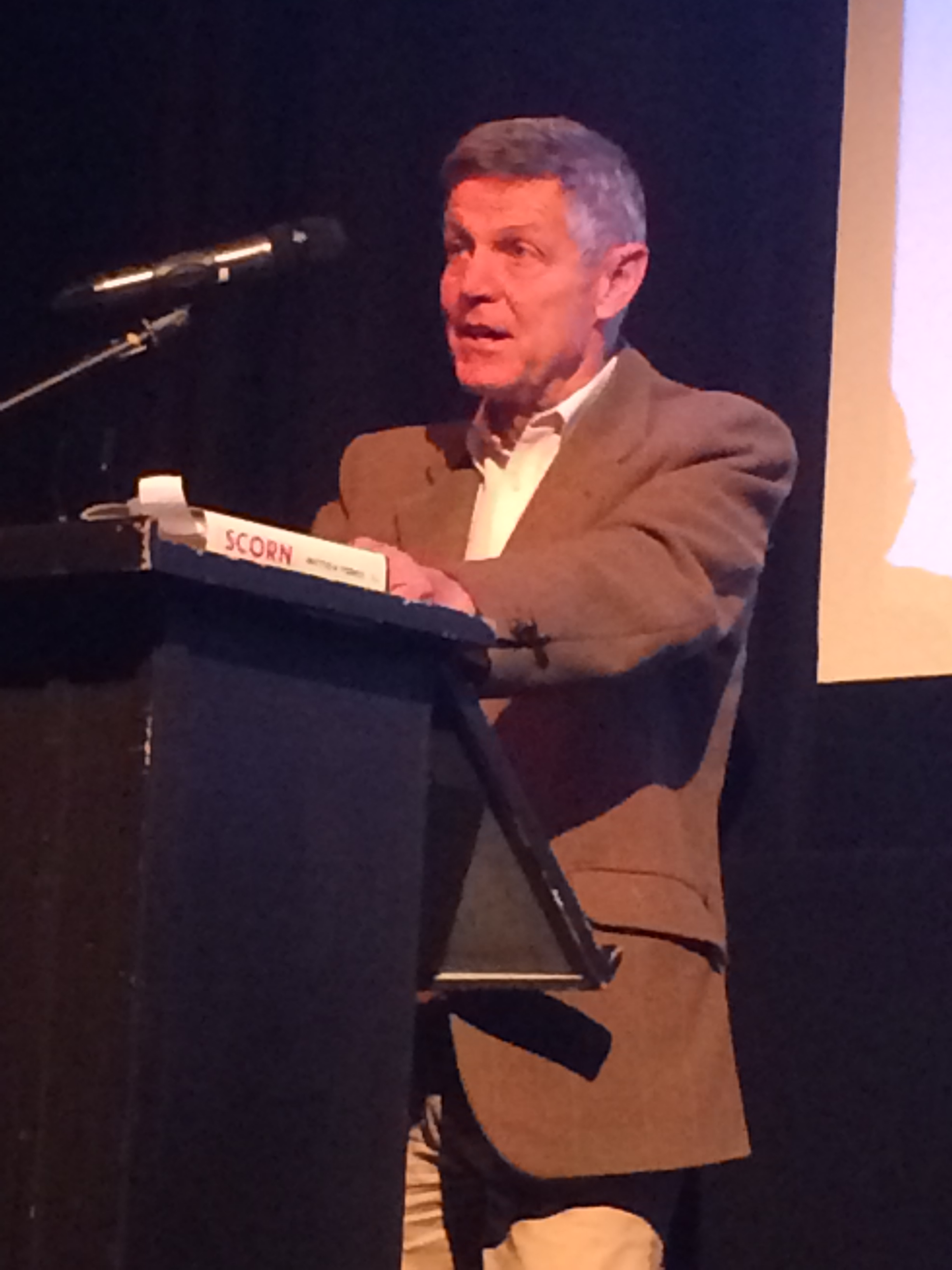

Member of Parliament for West Derbyshire
- In office 3 May 1979 – 8 May 1986
- Preceded by: James Scott-Hopkins
- Succeeded by: Patrick McLoughlin

Personal details
- Born: 7 August 1949 (age 77) Johannesburg, South Africa
- Party: Conservative
- Domestic partner: Julian Glover
- Education: Clare College, Cambridge (BA); Yale University

Matthew Francis Parris (born 7 August 1949) is a British political writer, broadcaster, and former politician. He served as Member of Parliament for West Derbyshire from 1979 to 1986. Ideologically a liberal conservative, he was a member of the Conservative Party, but resigned over the party's stance on Brexit.

Parris was born in South Africa to British parents. He subsequently studied at Clare College, Cambridge, and Yale University before working for the Foreign and Commonwealth Office and then the Conservative Research Department. He entered parliament in 1979 and remained there until 1986, resigning to pursue a journalistic career as presenter of the television series Weekend World. After the series ended in 1988, he became a freelance columnist for The Times. Having spoken out for gay rights throughout the 1980s, in 1989 he was a founding member of the gay rights charity Stonewall.

During the 1990s, Parris' columns began being collected together for book publication and in 2002 he published his autobiography. His political column proved influential, described as being widely regarded as essential reading among the political class in Westminster. By the 2010s and 2020s he was more openly critical of some of the groups he had been affiliated with, criticising Conservative leaders Boris Johnson and Liz Truss as well as Stonewall's move to include trans rights in its remit. In 2024, he ended his Saturday political column in The Times.

== Early life and education ==
Parris was born in Johannesburg, South Africa. The eldest of six children (three brothers and two sisters), he grew up in several British territories: South Africa, Cyprus, Rhodesia, Swaziland and Jamaica, where his father was working as an electrical engineer. His parents ended up working and living in Catalonia, Spain, where Parris later bought a house.

At the age of 19, Parris drove across Africa to Europe in a Morris Oxford; the trip was traumatically punctuated when, he reports in his 2002 autobiography, he and his female companion were attacked, and he was forced to witness her rape.

He later attributed his embrace of conservatism to an early reading of George Orwell's Animal Farm: "An admiration for [the pigs'] intelligence and sense of order dawned in me. I never liked them, but their final triumph taught me that idealism is not enough."

Parris was educated at Waterford Kamhlaba United World College of Southern Africa, an independent school just outside Mbabane in Swaziland, Sessions School on the island of Cyprus, and Clare College, Cambridge, where he gained a first class degree in law and was a member of the Cambridge University Liberal Club. He won a Paul Mellon scholarship and studied international relations at Yale University. At Yale, he failed to receive his Master of Arts degree, later blaming "too much coffee, Four Roses bourbon, training to break a five-minute mile and hanging out with interesting people." It was at the university that he befriended Peter Ackroyd.

== Early and parliamentary career ==
Parris was offered a job as an MI6 officer, but instead worked for the Foreign and Commonwealth Office for two years. In 1976, he left this career because he did not like its formality, and because he wanted to become a Member of Parliament. He eventually joined the Conservative Research Department and moved on to become correspondence secretary to Margaret Thatcher.

In the late 1970s, he was awarded an RSPCA medal – presented by Thatcher, then Leader of the Opposition – for jumping into the River Thames to rescue a dog. He later attributed that incident for the party's decision to select him as a parliamentary candidate.

Parris was the Conservative MP for the parliamentary constituency of West Derbyshire from 1979 to 1986. Competing prospective candidates for the seat included Peter Lilley and Michael Howard. He voiced support for gay rights. Parris left politics to pursue a career in journalism. While a politician he wrote a few newspaper columns; one, "Stop being Beastly to Tatchell" for The Times, complained about homophobic tactics used against Peter Tatchell in the 1983 Bermondsey by-election.

== Radio and television ==
Parris is now a radio and television presenter, The Times columnist, and pundit. As an MP he took part in a World in Action documentary during 1984 requiring him to live in Newcastle for a week on £26.80, the then state social security payment set for a single adult by the government he supported as a Conservative. The experiment came to an embarrassing end when he ran out of money for the electricity meter. Twenty years later, in 2004, he attempted the experiment again for the documentary For the Benefit of Mr Parris, Revisited.

Parris resigned as an MP by applying for the Crown position of Steward of the Manor of Northstead and left Parliament specifically to take over from Brian Walden as host of ITV's influential Sunday lunchtime current-affairs series Weekend World in 1986. The series, broadcast since 1977 with Walden at its helm, ran for two more years under Parris before being cancelled in 1988.

Until 2026, he presented BBC Radio 4's Great Lives biography series, and has appeared on the satirical news programme Have I Got News for You and presented After Dark. In 2007, Parris presented two light-hearted but caustic documentaries for Radio 4 on politicians' use of cliché and jargon, entitled Not My Words, Mr Speaker.

On 8 July 2011, on Radio 4's Any Questions?, at the height of the furore surrounding the alleged illegal and corrupt activities of News of the World journalists, Parris eulogised the newspaper and gave an enthusiastic appreciation of what he considered the virtues and positive achievements of Rupert Murdoch.

In December 2017 Parris appeared, in a cameo role, in the Anniversary edition of BBC's The League of Gentlemen.

== Writing and journalism ==
Parris is a prolific writer and has written many books on politics and travel. In 1991, a compilation of his pieces in The Times appeared, entitled So Far, So Good. Since then there have been further compilations. Scorn, a book he has edited of quotations about curses, jibes and general invective, was published in October 1994. He has achieved continuing success as a parliamentary reporter and columnist through his knowledge and understanding of politicians and ability to write well about them. He worked as parliamentary sketch writer for The Times newspaper from 1988 to 2001 and has had weekly columns in The Times and The Spectator magazine.

In 2004, Parris became Writer of the Year in Granada Television's What the Papers Say Awards. In part, this was for reporting on elections in Iraq and Afghanistan. His previous accolades include Columnist of the Year in the 1991 and 1993 British Press Awards, and in the What the Papers Say Awards 1992. In 1990 he received the London Press Club's Edgar Wallace Outstanding Reporter of the Year Award.

In 2002, his autobiography, Chance Witness: An Outsider's Life in Politics, was published by Viking. In 2005, he published A Castle in Spain about his family's project to refurbish a derelict sixteenth-century mansion, L'Avenc, in Catalonia, close to the foothills of the Pyrenees, and make his home there.

In 2011, Total Politics said that Parris's column "is considered essential reading by many in Westminster. He has a penchant for holding opinions that go against the grain. Parris has written scathingly about the localism agenda, and was a long-time defender of PMQs, although he recently changed his mind."

Parris's writing has often attracted wider comment. For example, in a 2007 article in The Times he wrote a satirical article which stated, "A festive custom we could do worse than foster would be stringing piano wire across country lanes to decapitate cyclists", which attracted two hundred letters to the Press Complaints Commission. Parris issued an apology: "I offended many with my Christmas attack on cyclists. It was meant humorously but so many cyclists have taken it seriously that I plainly misjudged. I am sorry." In the same year Alastair Campbell called Parris "a little shit" in his diaries, to which Parris responded "I'd rather be a little shit than a big cunt".

In the run-up to the 2014 Clacton by-election, Parris visited the Essex town and wrote a column suggesting that the Conservatives should dismiss its voters' views: "Clacton-on-Sea is going nowhere. Its voters are going nowhere, it's rather sad, and there's nothing more to say. This is Britain on crutches. This is tracksuit-and-trainers Britain, tattoo-parlour Britain, all-our-yesterdays Britain. [...] I am not arguing that we should be careless of the needs of struggling people and places such as Clacton. But I am arguing — if I am honest — that we should be careless of their opinions." The Clacton Gazette reported on residents responding angrily to his "derogatory comments". Douglas Carswell, the sitting Conservative MP who had defected to the UK Independence Party (UKIP), responded, "It's incredibly sad to read what Matthew Parris wrote. He's a close friend of the Tory leadership and this is clearly how the party hierarchy thinks. I'm proud of Clacton and I'm proud of Clacton people." Writing in The Daily Telegraph, academics Rob Ford and Matthew Goodwin noted of Parris's prognosis that "while it may play well at dinner parties in SW1 in the short-term, it is a recipe for electoral suicide." They also observed that UKIP party leader Nigel Farage had "already put Parris quotations" on the party's leaflets.

Parris criticised the initial 2015 leadership election for the Labour Party, referring to recent rule changes that allowed any individual who donated £3 to the Labour Party to vote in the leadership elections. Following a second leadership election, which incumbent leader Jeremy Corbyn won with an increased majority, Channel 4 presenter Krishnan Guru-Murthy said that Parris and Michael Dobbs commented that Corbyn's reelection "will break the Labour Party".

In 2024, Parris published an article on assisted suicide, where he argued "the argument against it is that pressure will grow on the terminally ill to hasten their own deaths – that’s not a bad thing."

A co-founder of the gay rights charity Stonewall, Parris has criticised the organisation for latterly adopting trans rights as part of its agenda, writing that trans issues are unrelated to gay rights and should be for a separate organisation.

In May 2021, Parris called for the removal of ethnic minority status from Gypsy, Roma and Travellers, describing them "not a race, but a doomed mindset" and called for "a gradual but relentless squeeze on anyone who tries without permission to park their home on public property or the property of others." The anti-racism group Hope not Hate responded to Parris saying "The Times have published an article advocating for eradicating the way of life of an entire ethnic minority. Absolutely shameful. Solidarity with Gypsy, Roma and Traveller people who have to endure this racism, and this mindset."

In June 2021, Parris argued there was "an absolute problem with human rights" and wrote a column whose "aim is to question the whole concept of fundamental human rights. It is so deeply flawed as to be fatal to all reasoning built upon it."

In his writing, Parris proved critical of several Conservative leaders. In June 2020 Parris wrote an excoriating article on Boris Johnson saying, "He never had any judgment or strategic vision. Mr Johnson was only ever a shallow opportunist with a minor talent to amuse". In 2022, Parris described Liz Truss as "a planet-sized mass of overconfidence and ambition teetering upon a pinhead of a political brain".

In July 2024, a few weeks short of his 75th birthday, Parris stopped writing his long-running Saturday opinion column in The Times, in which he mostly commented on British politics. He continues to write his diary column for the newspaper, which appears on Wednesdays.

=== Travel writing ===
Parris has made several expeditions abroad. They include Mount Kilimanjaro in 1967 and in 1989; Zaire (now the Democratic Republic of the Congo) in 1973; the Sahara in 1978; Peru; Bolivia. In 1990 he published Inca-Kola about his travels in Peru.

He spent the Antarctic winter of 2000 on the French possession of Grande Terre, part of the Kerguelen Archipelago in the Indian Ocean, with a few dozen over-winterers, mostly researchers. One of them was fatally shot in an accident during his stay, about which he wrote for The Times.

== Personal life ==
Ideologically, in 2024 Parris described himself as inclining towards liberal conservatism.

Parris claims he attempted to out himself in a late-night debate in the House of Commons in 1984, but nobody noticed. He announced that he was gay in one of his weekly newspaper columns and admitted that he cruised Clapham Common for sex. In an interview on Newsnight, during the Ron Davies scandal of 1998, he told Jeremy Paxman that there were two gay members of the then Labour Cabinet, one being Peter Mandelson.

In August 2006 Parris entered into a civil partnership with his long-term partner, Julian Glover, a speechwriter for David Cameron and a former political journalist at The Guardian. At the time of their partnership, they had been together for 11 years.

Parris owns homes in Spain, Derbyshire (where he keeps pet alpacas) and the Docklands in East London. He is the honorary patron of Clare Politics, a student-run politics society at Clare College, Cambridge. He was a keen marathon runner, taking part in all of the first five stagings of the London Marathon between 1981 and 1985. His personal best was 2:32:57, achieved at his fifth, and final participation in the event in 1985 at the age of 35, a record which Total Politics in 2018 said "looks unlikely to be smashed any time soon"; John Lamont, the fastest of 15 MPs in the marathon that year, finished at 3:38:03. Parris decided that he wanted to go out on top, and arguing that serious running is not good for one's health, he stopped running marathons after that. No British MP, sitting or retired, has bettered Parris' marathon-running time.

== Reception and influence ==
In October 2017, the commentator Iain Dale placed Parris at Number 84 in his list of 'The Top 100 Most Influential People on the Right', describing him as "the pre-eminent columnist of his generation". In August 2010, in a list compiled by the Independent on Sunday, Parris was voted the 49th most influential LGBT person in Britain.

== Bibliography ==
- Scorn: The Wittiest and Wickedest Insults in Human History Matthew Parris (Profile Books Ltd, 2016) ISBN 1781257299
- Parting Shots: Undiplomatic Diplomats – the ambassadors' letters you were never meant to see Matthew Parris, Andrew Bryson (Penguin Books Ltd, 2010) ISBN 978-0-670-91929-1
- Mission Accomplished!: A Treasury of the Things Politicians Wish They Hadn't Said Matthew Parris, Phil Mason (JR Books Ltd, 2007) ISBN 978-1-906217-35-8
- A Castle in Spain (Viking, 2005) ISBN 0-670-91547-5
- Chance Witness: An Outsider's Life in Politics (Viking, 2002) ISBN 0-670-89440-0
- The King's English (Oxford Language Classics Series) Henry Fowler, Frank Fowler, Matthew Parris (introduction) (Oxford University Press, 2002) ISBN 0-19-860507-2
- Off Message: New Labour, New Sketches (Robson Books, 2001) ISBN 1-86105-479-3
- I Wish I Hadn't Said That: The Experts Speak – and Get It Wrong! Matthew Parris (foreword), Christopher Cerf, Victor Navasky (HarperCollins, 2000) ISBN 0-00-653149-0
- Against the Law: The Classic Account of a Homosexual in 1950s Britain Peter Wildeblood, Matthew Parris (introduction) (Weidenfeld & Nicolson, 1999) ISBN 0-297-64382-7
- The Great Unfrocked: Two Thousand Years of Church Scandal (Robson, 1998) ISBN 1-86105-129-8
- Scorn with Extra Bile Matthew Parris (editor) (Penguin Books, 1998) ISBN 0-14-027780-3
- I Couldn't Possibly Comment: More Sketches from the Commons (Robson Books, 1997) ISBN 1-86105-095-X
- Read My Lips: A Treasury of Things Politicians Wish They Hadn't Said (Parkwest Publications, 1997) ISBN 1-86105-043-7
- Great Parliamentary Scandals: Four Centuries of Calumny, Smear and Innuendo (Robson Books, 1995) ISBN 0-86051-957-0
- Scorn with Added Vitriol (Hamish Hamilton, 1995) ISBN 0-241-13587-7
- Scorn: A Bucketful of Discourtesy, Disparagement, Invective, Ridicule, Impudence, Contumely, Derision, Hate, Affront, Disdain, Bile, Taunts, Curses and Jibes (Hamish Hamilton, 1994) ISBN 0-241-13384-X
- Look Behind You!: Sketches and Follies from the Commons (Robson, 1993) ISBN 0-86051-874-4
- So Far So Good...: Selected Pieces (Weidenfeld & Nicolson, 1991) ISBN 0-297-81215-7
- Inca Kola: A Traveller's Tale of Peru (Weidenfeld & Nicolson, 1990) ISBN 0-297-81075-8
- Coping with the Soviet Union Peter Blaker, Julian Critchley, Matthew Parris (Conservative Political Centre Bookshop, 1977) ISBN 0-85070-599-1

Parliament of the United Kingdom
| Preceded by James Scott-Hopkins | Member of Parliament for West Derbyshire; 1979–1986 | Succeeded by Sir Patrick McLoughlin |
