= Ellen E. Jones =

- Born: 1983 (age 42–43); London
- Notable work: Screenshot

Ellen E. Jones is an English film critic, television critic, author and radio presenter. She is the co-presenter (with Mark Kermode) of the BBC Radio 4 programme Screenshot. Jones is a regular contributor to The Guardian (since 2011) and Empire as well as the author of Screen Deep.

== Career ==
Jones was a resident critic for both BBC One's Film 2016 and Film 2017.

Since 2021 Jones has co-presented Screenshot with Mark Kermode.

She has also hosted Inside Cinema, with episodes centred on the career of director Jordan Peele and representations of British Rave culture.

In 2024 Faber published Screen Deep: How film and TV can solve racism and save the world.

At the 2025 Broadcasting Press Guild awards, Jones won Best Radio Presenter for her work on Screenshot. In the same year, Jones received the Kraszna-Krausz award for books on Photography and the Moving Image for Screen Deep.

== Personal life ==
Jones' parents separated when she was young. She was raised in "the pre-gentrification Hackney of the 1980s and 1990s." She is mixed-race.

She has a husband called Koos.

In 2017, she stated her favourite film was His Girl Friday and her favourite scene was the ending of Some Like It Hot.
