= Antonia Quirke =

British film critic

Antonia Quirke is a British film critic. As well as writing on film for the Financial Times and a weekly column for the New Statesman, she has presented regularly on The Film Programme, Pick of the Week, BBC Radio 4, as well as Film... and The One Show on BBC One.

Quirke attended, in her words, a "doughty northern convent school", the Loreto Grammar School gaining 6 O-levels and 4 A-levels. She lived on Spring Road.

She has a degree in English literature from University College London.

Quirke participated in the 2012 Sight & Sound critics' poll, where she listed her ten favourite films as follows: The Deer Hunter, Going Places, Jaws, King Kong, Nosferatu, On the Waterfront, Rear Window, Reds, This Is Spinal Tap, and A Woman Is a Woman.

== Publications ==
- Jaws (2002)
- Madame Depardieu and the Beautiful Strangers (2007)
- Choking on Marlon Brando: A Film Critic's Memoir About Love and the Movies (2007)
