= Francine Stock =

British journalist

Francine Stock (born 14 March 1958) is a British radio and television presenter and novelist, of part-French origin.

== Early life ==
Born in Devon in 1958, Stock is the daughter of John Stock and his wife JeanAnne Mallet. After her early years in Edinburgh and Australia, she was educated at St Catherine's School, Bramley, Surrey and is a graduate of Jesus College, Oxford, with a degree in Modern Languages (French and Italian).

== Career in journalism ==
After working in specialist journalism on the oil industry, Stock joined the BBC in 1983. At first she reported on financial news and worked as a radio producer, later moving into television as presenter of Newsnight and (briefly, after serious illness) on The Money Programme on BBC2. In the mid-1990s she presented BBC2's The Antiques Show with Tim Wonnacott and was one of the original presenters of BBC Radio 4's Front Row in 1998.

She later moved to The Film Programme on radio, until it was cancelled in 2021. She is also the regular host of the BAFTA Life in Pictures strand, and regularly writes about film for Prospect magazine. She also presents "The Cultural Front" on BBC Radio 4 which examines the First World War and how it changed society and the arts.

== Other roles ==
Since 2005, she has been chair of the Tate Members Council and became the first female Honorary Fellow of Jesus College in 2007. As a novelist, Stock has published two works of fiction: A Foreign Country (1999, shortlisted for the Whitbread First Novel award) and Man-Made Fibre (2002).

She is married to Robert Lance Hughes; the couple have two grown-up daughters.

== Bibliography ==
Novels

- A Foreign Country (1999)
- Man-made Fibre (2002)

Non-Fiction

- In Glorious Technicolor: a Century of Film and How it Has Shaped Us (2011)
