= Film... (TV programme) =

- Genre: Film review
- Directed by: Stephen Neal
- Presented by: Jacky Gillott/Joan Bakewell/Iain Johnstone/Barry Norman/Frederic Raphael and others (1971–1972); Barry Norman (1972–1998); Iain Johnstone (1982); Jonathan Ross (1999–2010); Claudia Winkleman (2010–2016); Danny Leigh (2010–2017); Clara Amfo/Zoe Ball/Edith Bowman/Charlie Brooker/Ellen E Jones/Al Murray/Antonia Quirke and others (2017–2018)
- Theme music composer: Billy Taylor
- Opening theme: "I Wish I Knew How It Would Feel to Be Free" by Billy Taylor (1963)
- Country of origin: United Kingdom
- Original language: English

Production
- Executive producer: Janet Lee
- Production locations: Studio V, Broadcasting House
- Running time: 30 minutes
- Production company: BBC Studios

Original release
- Network: BBC One
- Release: 16 November 1971 – 28 March 2018

Related
- The Film Review; Talking Movies

Film '71 – Film 2018 is a British film review television programme, which was usually broadcast on BBC One. The title of the show changed each year to incorporate the year of broadcast until its cancellation in December 2018.

== Presenters and critics ==
=== Early years ===
The show was first broadcast on 16 November 1971 but it was only shown in the South East area of the UK under the title Film '71. It was eventually shown in all areas of the UK in March 1976. The show was first hosted by several presenters, including Jacky Gillott, Joan Bakewell, Frederic Raphael, Iain Johnstone, and Barry Norman.

=== Barry Norman (1972–1998) ===
Barry Norman in 1977, as seen in his review of Star Wars.

Barry Norman became permanent host of the series in 1972. For his first episode on Film 72, his first film review was of The Last Picture Show, while his first studio interviewees were Charlton Heston and James Stewart. For much of his time on the show, "with Barry Norman" was appended to the show's title.

Norman remained as host until 1998, except for a few months in 1982, when he was busy with other projects and Iain Johnstone returned as temporary host. Norman eventually left the show after signing a contract with BSkyB, with his last appearance being at the end of June 1998 hosting Film '98.

With the series now described as the BBC's flagship cinema review, giving popularity to Barry's catchphrase "And why not?", Norman's departure to Sky was said by The Guardian in 2002 to have been "seismic", and due to its nature and timing, his exit was described as being acrimonious. Norman said of the departure, "I honestly believe that if they had said to me, 'We would like you to work out your contract but then we don't want you any more,' they would have given me quite a big send off – at least they would have had a drinks party. But because I left at a time that was not convenient for them I became a non-person. Even on the last day, nobody called up to say, 'Good luck in your future life,' or even 'drop dead'." Of his reviewing style Norman said: "I always knew that nobody's right and nobody's wrong in criticism. The only thing I could do was to make sure that whatever I said was what I really believed."

=== Jonathan Ross (1999–2010) ===
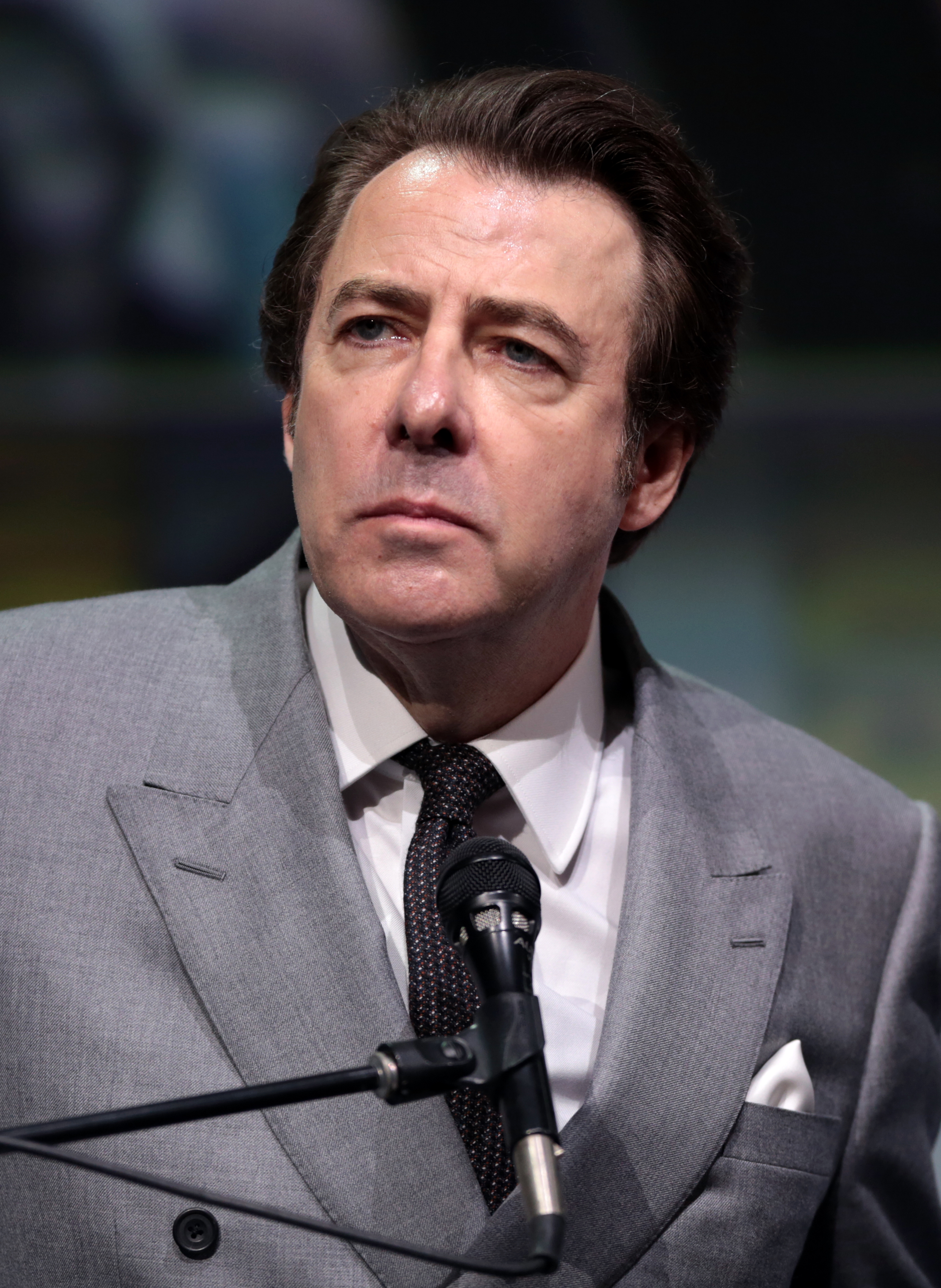
Jonathan Ross in 2007. He was chosen as the second host for Film...

Jonathan Ross was chosen as the next host, and presented the show from 1999 until March 2010. Reflecting the change in host, the phrase "with Jonathan Ross" was appended to the show's title.

Ross began presenting the show as Film '99 in March 1999, on a contract reportedly worth £500,000 a year. Ross, described by the BBC as a long-time film buff and fan of cult movies, stated that he had dreamt of doing the job since childhood.

To mark the turn of the millennium, the viewers of Film 99 voted in a poll to name their favourite film of the century, with the top 100 published by the BBC and with Star Wars coming top overall. Following the millennium, the show switched from the two-digit format to using the full year in the title, i.e. Film 2000, Film 2001...

Film 2008 was briefly removed from the schedules during Ross's 12-week suspension from all BBC activities following the Sachsgate controversy.

Ross presented the programme for the last time on 17 March 2010. This came after he announced in January 2010 that he would not be renewing his BBC contract, with his BBC One chat show and BBC Radio 2 show both also finishing in July 2010.

=== Claudia Winkleman (2010–2016) ===
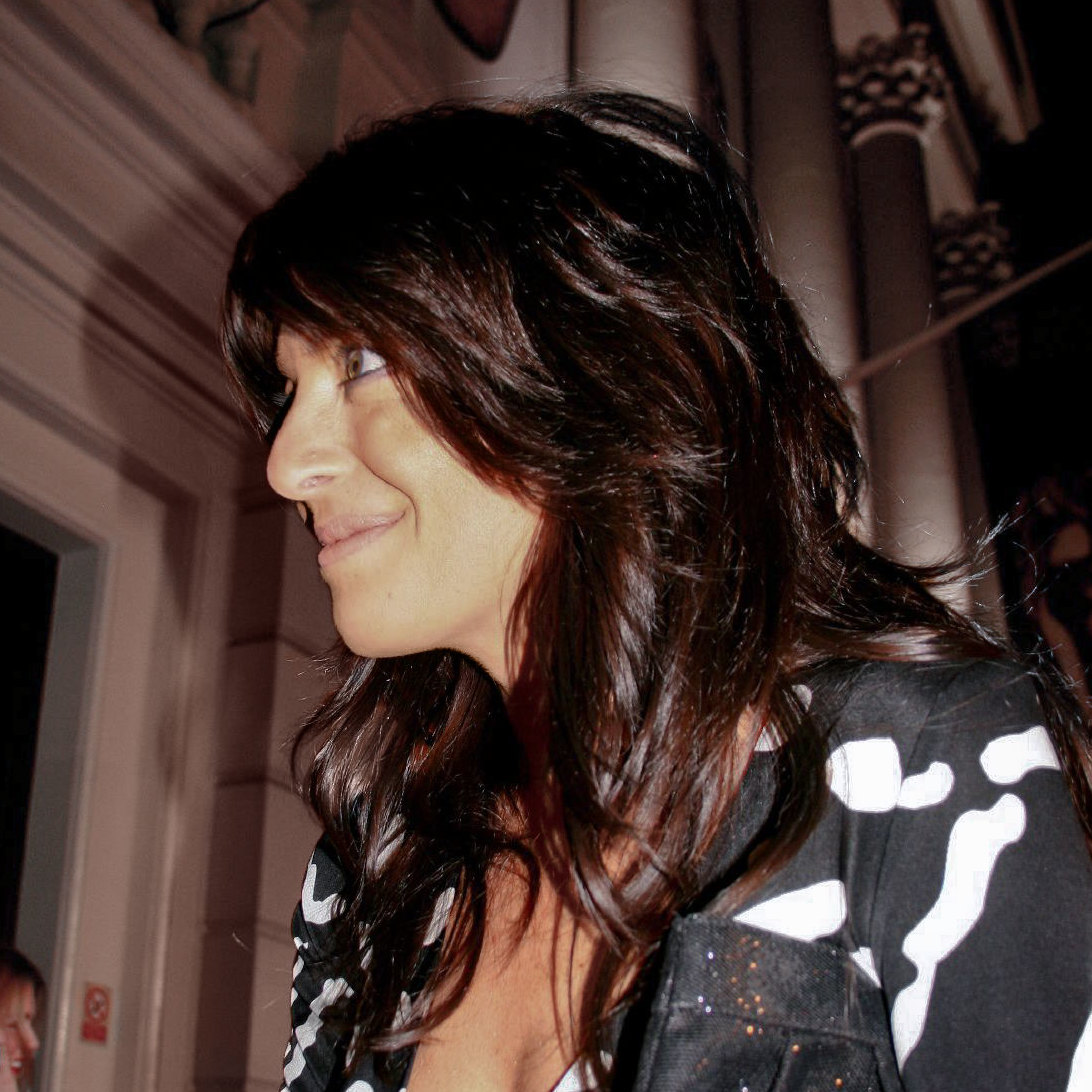
Claudia Winkleman in 2008. She took over as host of Film 2010 in a revamped format.

In October 2010, Claudia Winkleman took over as host of Film 2010 in a revamped format. This saw the adoption of a live studio format and the introduction of a co-presenter, film journalist Danny Leigh. The first episode of Film 2010 with Claudia Winkleman aired on Wednesday 13 October at 10:45 pm.

Regular contributors also included film critics Catherine Bray, Chris Hewitt and Antonia Quirke.

BBC Radio 5 Live's Mark Kermode had been tipped as a likely successor to Ross for the show. However, in March 2010, Kermode said that he had not been contacted about hosting the show which he said "requires a mainstream sensibility", and instead Winkleman was announced as a surprise choice for the presenter's role. Damon Wise of Empire feared that Winkleman's appointment represented a rejection of film knowledge as a requirement of a host for the show, and that it might foretell the demise of the series in the same manner as Top of the Pops, "another flagship BBC show that was allowed to slide out of existence." The Guardian stated, through her recent hosting of Sky Television's coverage of the Oscars, Winkleman had "proved both a passionate and engaging advocate of cinema," while her husband Kris Thykier is a film producer with credits on several mainstream releases. She also presented a weekly arts show on BBC Radio 2 on Friday nights, which covers film.

When the programme returned for a new series in November 2012, it began being referred to in the titles as Film 2012 with Claudia Winkleman and Danny Leigh with Leigh now co-host alongside Winkleman.

=== Rotating presenters (2016–2018) ===
In September 2016, Winkleman announced that she would be leaving the show. Following her departure, the show was hosted on rotation. Clara Amfo, Zoe Ball, Edith Bowman, Charlie Brooker, Al Murray and Antonia Quirke have all hosted at least twice.

Danny Leigh served as the resident film critic from 2010 to 2017. Following Leigh's departure, recurring critic Ellen E. Jones became the new resident critic. Each show, the presenter and resident critic were joined by another established screenwriter or critic. These included: Peter Bradshaw, Rhianna Dhillon, Chris Hewitt, Larushka Ivan-Zadeh, Tim Robey, and Jason Solomons.

In December 2018 the BBC dropped the show and, despite a spokesperson promising "an enhanced offer for lovers of film", fans were still dismayed by the change.

== Music ==
The theme music of the show was "I Wish I Knew" by Billy Taylor, which is also known in its vocal version "I Wish I Knew How It Would Feel to Be Free", popularised by Nina Simone in a 1967 release. During short sequences of films being shown, incidental music would be played, often from a light jazz music style, known as hard bop.

- "Unsquare Dance" – Dave Brubeck
- "Cantaloupe Island" – Herbie Hancock
- "Mas que nada" – Sérgio Mendes
- "The More I See You" – Harry Warren, performed by Chris Montez
- "The Sidewinder" – Lee Morgan
- "Cast Your Fate to the Wind" and "Linus and Lucy" – Vince Guaraldi
- "Wade in the Water" – Ramsey Lewis
