= The Film Programme =

British radio programme (2004–2021)

- Genre: Talk radio
- Country of origin: United Kingdom
- Language(s): English
- Home station: BBC Radio 4
- Hosted by: Francine Stock; Antonia Quirke
- Original release: 2004 – 30 September 2021
- Website: Official website

The Film Programme was a British film review radio programme, broadcast weekly on BBC Radio 4, from 2004 to 2021, presented by Francine Stock.

== Overview ==
The programme had a number of regular contributors, including Neil Brand and Rosemary Fletcher.

The programme's BBC Programme Identifier was b006r5jt. Its regular presenters included Francine Stock and Antonia Quirke.

It was confirmed in September 2021 that the programme was to be axed and replaced by a new show with the title Screenshot to be hosted by Mark Kermode and Ellen E Jones. The last scheduled programme was broadcast on 30 September 2021, co-hosted by Francine Stock and Antonia Quirke.
